= Tyler Hill (racing driver) =

American racing driver (born 1994)

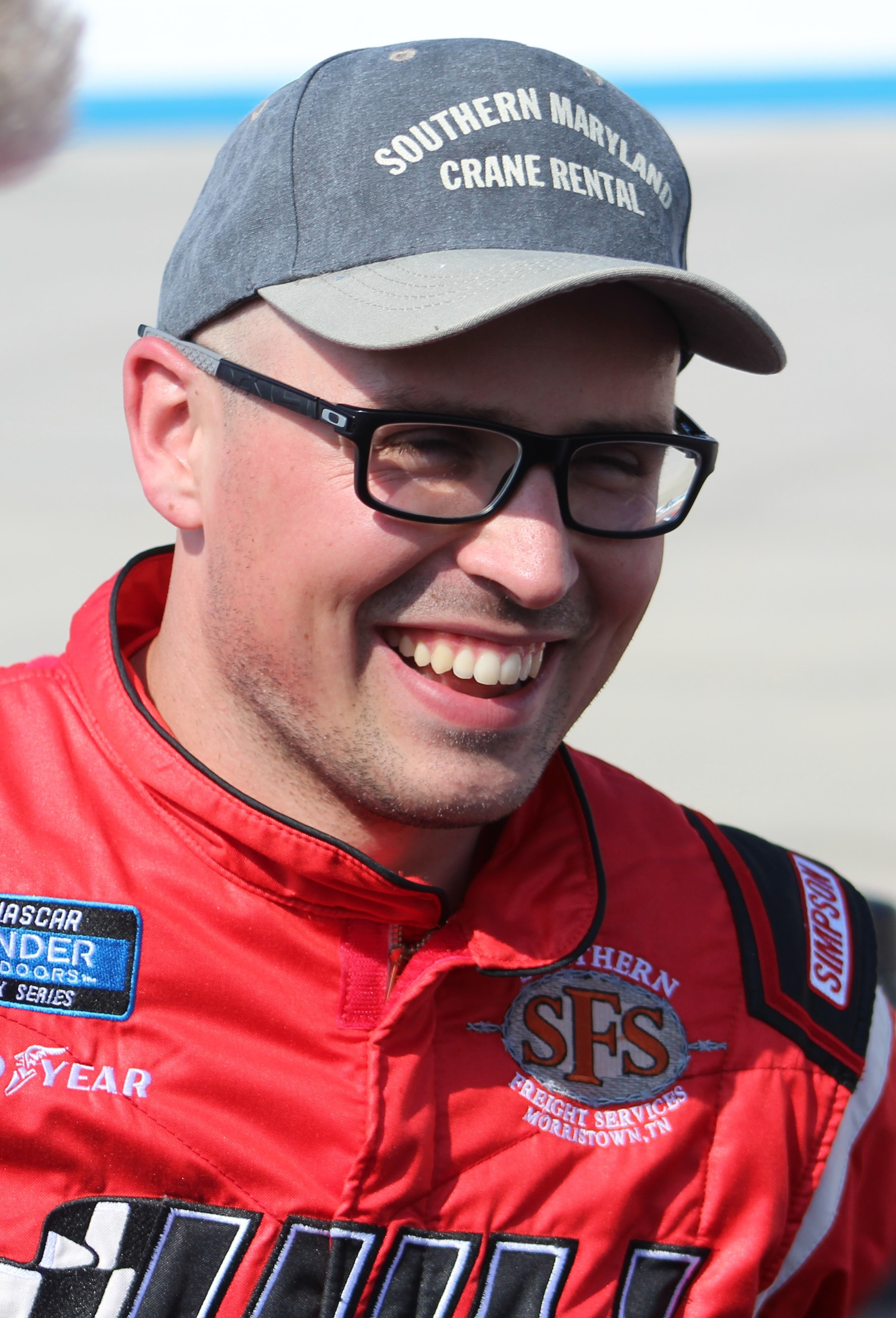
- Hill at Dover International Speedway in 2019
- Born: Tyler Grant Hill; June 2, 1994 (age 32); Port Tobacco, Maryland, U.S.
- Achievements: 2011 Allison Legacy Series champion

NASCAR O'Reilly Auto Parts Series career
- 4 races run over 2 years
- 2019 position: 95th
- Best finish: 78th (2018)
- First race: 2018 Whelen Trusted to Perform 200 (Phoenix)
- Last race: 2019 LTi Printing 250 (Michigan)
Wins	Top tens	Poles
0	0	0

NASCAR FedEx Freight Truck Series career
- 39 races run over 5 years
- 2023 position: 35th
- Best finish: 25th (2020)
- First race: 2019 JEGS 200 (Dover)
- Last race: 2023 Love's RV Stop 250 (Talladega)
Wins	Top tens	Poles
0	1	0

ARCA Menards Series career
- 5 races run over 2 years
- Best finish: 29th (2018)
- First race: 2018 Primera Plastics 200 (Berlin)
- Last race: 2020 Dawn Ultra 150 (Kansas)
Wins	Top tens	Poles
0	1	0
- Statistics up to date as of September 30, 2023.

Tyler Grant Hill (born June 2, 1994) is an American professional stock car racing driver and team owner. He last competed part-time in the NASCAR Craftsman Truck Series, driving the No. 56 Toyota Tundra for Hill Motorsports. He has also driven in the ARCA Racing Series for Fast Track Racing and NASCAR Xfinity Series for MBM Motorsports in the past.

He is the son of former NASCAR driver Jerry Hill and the brother of current NASCAR driver Timmy Hill, who shares driving duties and co-owns the No. 56 truck with Tyler.

== Racing career ==
Starting to race at the age of five, Hill did so racing go-karts. He later moved up to bandolero racing and the Allison Legacy Series, in which he claimed the 2011 national championship. Hill tested an ARCA Racing Series car for MBM Motorsports in January 2017 but did not debut in the series until August 2018, driving for Fast Track Racing at Berlin Raceway. He wound up running four races for FTR in 2018, culminating in a seventh-place in the season finale at Kansas Speedway, Hill's first top-ten in ARCA competition. In the race, Hill spun on lap two but advanced throughout the race due to a large amount of attrition in the race.

In November 2018, Hill made his NASCAR debut in the Xfinity Series, driving the No. 13 for MBM Motorsports at ISM Raceway. Hill spun during the later stages of the event and finished 15 laps in arrears to the leader.

Hill returned to MBM for the 2019 iK9 Service Dog 200, also at ISM, driving the team's No. 66 entry. Later in the year, older brother Timmy formed Hill Motorsports to compete in the NASCAR Gander Outdoors Truck Series, with him sharing the No. 56 with Tyler; the number was used by their father Jerry during his career. He debuted at Dover International Speedway in the spring. A spin in qualifying at Las Vegas Motor Speedway in September resulted in Hill's first series DNQ.

In the 2021 Chevrolet Silverado 250 at Talladega, Hill survived the race to finish second place right behind the winner, Tate Fogleman.

== Personal life ==
Hill graduated from North Point High School in 2012.

== Motorsports career results ==
=== NASCAR ===
(key) (Bold – Pole position awarded by qualifying time. Italics – Pole position earned by points standings or practice time. * – Most laps led.)

==== Xfinity Series ====
NASCAR Xfinity Series results
Year	Team	No.	Make	1	2	3	4	5	6	7	8	9	10	11	12	13	14	15	16	17	18	19	20	21	22	23	24	25	26	27	28	29	30	31	32	33	NXSC	Pts	Ref
2018	MBM Motorsports	13	Dodge	DAY	ATL	LVS	PHO	CAL	TEX	BRI	RCH	TAL	DOV	CLT	POC	MCH	IOW	CHI	DAY	KEN	NHA	IOW	GLN	MOH	BRI	ROA	DAR	IND	LVS	RCH	ROV	DOV	KAN	TEX	PHO; 31	HOM	78th	6	
2019	MBM Motorsports	66	Toyota	DAY	ATL	LVS	PHO; 20	CAL	TEX; 28	BRI	RCH	TAL	DOV	CLT	POC	MCH; 35	IOW	CHI	DAY	KEN	NHA	IOW	GLN	MOH	BRI	ROA	DAR	IND	LVS	RCH	ROV	DOV	KAN	TEX	PHO	HOM	95th	0^{1}	

==== Craftsman Truck Series ====
NASCAR Craftsman Truck Series results
Year	Team	No.	Make	1	2	3	4	5	6	7	8	9	10	11	12	13	14	15	16	17	18	19	20	21	22	23	NCTC	Pts	Ref
2019	Hill Motorsports	56	Chevy	DAY	ATL	LVS	MAR	TEX	DOV; 20	KAN	CLT	TEX	IOW; 26	GTW	CHI	KEN; 11	POC	ELD	MCH	BRI	MSP	LVS; DNQ	TAL	MAR	PHO	HOM; 23	42nd	68	
2020	Hill Motorsports	56	Chevy	DAY	LVS	CLT	ATL	HOM; 25	POC; 19	KEN; 30	TEX	KAN	KAN; 16	MCH; 21	DRC; 16		GTW; 21	DAR	RCH	BRI	LVS; 17	TAL	KAN; 14	TEX; 11	MAR	PHO; 25	25th	199	
2020	CMI Motorsports	49	Chevy													DOV; 30											25th	199	
2021	Hill Motorsports	56	Chevy	DAY	DRC	LVS; 35	ATL	BRD	RCH	KAN	DAR	COA	CLT	TEX; 19	NSH	POC; 24	KNX	GLN	GTW; 11	DAR; 32	BRI	LVS; 17			PHO; 33		31st	123	
2021	Hill Motorsports	56	Toyota																				TAL; 2	MAR			31st	123	
2022	Hill Motorsports	5	Toyota	DAY	LVS	ATL	COA; DNQ	MAR	BRD	DAR	KAN; 21	TEX; 25	CLT	GTW; 25	SON	KNX	NSH	MOH	POC; 30	IRP	RCH; DNQ	KAN; 29	BRI	TAL	HOM; 29	PHO; 23	37th	77	
2023	Hill Motorsports	56	Toyota	DAY	LVS	ATL	COA	TEX; Wth	BRD	MAR	KAN; 22	DAR	NWS	CLT; 24	GTW	NSH	MOH	POC; 21	RCH	IRP; 26	MLW; 29	KAN	BRI	TAL; 30	HOM; 22	PHO; 20	35th	102	

^{*} Season still in progress
^{1} Ineligible for series points

=== ARCA Menards Series ===
(key) (Bold – Pole position awarded by qualifying time. Italics – Pole position earned by points standings or practice time. * – Most laps led.)

ARCA Menards Series results
Year	Team	No.	Make	1	2	3	4	5	6	7	8	9	10	11	12	13	14	15	16	17	18	19	20	AMSC	Pts	Ref
2018	Fast Track Racing	10	Toyota	DAY	NSH	SLM	TAL	TOL	CLT	POC	MCH	MAD	GTW	CHI	IOW	ELK	POC	ISF	BLN; 13	DSF	SLM; 14		KAN; 7	29th	680	
2018	Fast Track Racing	11	Toyota																			IRP; 14		29th	680	
2020	Fast Track Racing	11	Chevy	DAY	PHO	TAL	POC	IRP	KEN	IOW	KAN; 14	TOL	TOL	MCH	DRC	GTW	L44	TOL	BRI	WIN	MEM	ISF	KAN	67th	30	
