= Raphaël Lessard =

Canadian racing driver (born 2001)

- Lessard on the podium at Brands Hatch in 2026
- Born: July 5, 2001 (age 25); St-Joseph-de-Beauce, Quebec, Canada
- Achievements: First French Canadian to win a NASCAR National Series race and NASCAR Camping World Truck Series race 2016 CARS Super Late Model Tour Champion; 2018 Redbud 400 winner 2021 Tom Curley 250 winner
- Awards: 2016 CARS Super Late Model Tour Rookie of the Year

NASCAR FedEx Freight Truck Series career
- 35 races run over 3 years
- 2021 position: 28th
- Best finish: 12th (2020)
- First race: 2019 TruNorth Global 250 (Martinsville)
- Last race: 2021 WISE Power 200 (Kansas)
- First win: 2020 Chevrolet Silverado 250 (Talladega)
Wins	Top tens	Poles
1	11	0

NASCAR Canada Series career
- 19 races run over 6 years
- Car no., team: No. 7 (DJK Racing)
- 2026 position: 49th
- Best finish: 27th (2019)
- First race: 2019 Budweiser 300 (Chaudiere)
- Last race: 2026 Le Tours 45 CarGurus (Trois-Rivières)
- First win: 2019 Budweiser 300 (Chaudiere)
- Last win: 2021 General Tire 125 (Sunset)
Wins	Top tens	Poles
3	12	0
- Statistics up to date as of September 13, 2026.

Raphaël Lessard (pronounced "less-ard"; born July 5, 2001) is a Canadian professional stock car racing driver. He currently competes full-time in the NASCAR Euro Series, driving the No. 11 Ford for Alumitec Racing and part-time in the NASCAR Canada Series, driving the No. 7 Dodge for DJK Racing. He has also driven for Venturini Motorsports in the ARCA Racing Series, and GMS Racing, Kyle Busch Motorsports and DGR-Crosley in the NASCAR Camping World Truck Series.

== Racing career ==
=== Early career ===
Lessard started racing in an old Honda Civic, winning his first race on the day of his 12th birthday. He then ran Quebec sportsmans and super late models in Canada before moving to America.

=== CARS Tour ===
==== 2015 ====
Lessard's first American racing experience came in the CARS Super Late Model Tour, driving the 2015 season for Toyota Racing Development and David Gilliland Racing.

==== 2016 ====
In 2016, at age 15, and in grade 10, Lessard became the second non-American to win the CARS Super Late Model series championship, the other being Mario Gosselin, also a Canadian from Quebec, who accomplished the feat in 1997. It was Lessard's first championship. He won four of ten races during the season, including the season finale at Southern National Motorsports Park. Lessard continued with Toyota and David Gilliland Racing to run late model racing in large events like the Winchester 400, Snowball Derby and various PASS Late Model, CRA Racing Series and ARCA Racing Series events.

==== 2017 ====
To start off 2017, Lessard was disqualified from an April PASS race for intentionally wrecking other drivers, illegally passing under yellow, and inappropriate actions by his crew.

=== ARCA Racing Series ===
==== 2017 ====
Lessard debuted in the ARCA Racing Series in 2017 driving for Venturini Motorsports. He made the top-ten in his second start at Winchester Speedway.

=== Truck Series ===
==== 2019 ====
On February 15, 2019, it was announced that Lessard would drive three races in the No. 46 Toyota Tundra for Kyle Busch Motorsports in the NASCAR Gander Outdoors Truck Series. Lessard started seventh and finished 14th in his Truck Series debut at Martinsville. In June, he joined DGR-Crosley's No. 17 truck for the Iowa Speedway and Canadian Tire Motorsport Park races.

==== 2020 ====
In 2020, Lessard joined KBM for the full Truck season in the No. 4 Tundra. Despite missing the playoffs, he won his first career Truck race at Talladega Superspeedway when he was leading as the caution came out on the final lap, becoming the first French Canadian to win in a NASCAR national series.

==== 2021 ====
Lessard lost his KBM ride to John Hunter Nemechek in 2021 and subsequently moved to GMS Racing to drive the No. 24. The plans initially outlined a 12-race schedule before it was increased to the full season. However, funding troubles forced him out of the truck after seven races.

=== Xfinity Series ===
==== 2022 ====
Lessard was scheduled to drive the No. 87 for SQR Development on a part-time basis in the NASCAR Xfinity Series throughout the 2022. Team owner J. C. Stout was unable to field the team due to "personal reasons", leaving Lessard without a ride. Stout had been arrested in January 2022 for criminal contempt after a pattern of erratic behavior.

=== Canada Series ===
==== 2019 ====
Lessard made his Pinty's Series debut at Autodrome Chaudière. He went on to win in his series debut.

==== 2021 ====
Lessard swept the first two races at Sunset.

== Personal life ==
Lessard's father was a race car driver, but sold his cars to help move Raphaël's racing career.

== Motorsports career results ==
Season	Series	Team	Races	Wins	Top 5	Top 10	Points	Position
2016	CARS Super Late Model Tour	David Gilliland	10	4	8	9	307	**1st**
2017	CARS Super Late Model Tour	David Gilliland	6	1	3	4	135	10th
2017	ARCA Racing Series	Venturini Motorsports	3	0	0	1	370	51st
2018	CARS Super Late Model Tour	Kyle Busch Motorsports	8	1	4	5	203	4th
2019	ARCA Menards Series	KBR Development	3	0	2	3	615	27th
2019	NASCAR Pinty's Series	Dumoulin Competition	2	1	1	2	85	27th
2019	NASCAR K&N Pro Series East	Bill McAnally Racing	1	0	0	1	35	34th
2019	NASCAR Gander Outdoors Truck Series	Kyle Busch Motorsports	3	0	0	0	135	32nd
2019	NASCAR Gander Outdoors Truck Series	DGR-Crosley	2	0	0	2	135	32nd
2020	NASCAR Gander Outdoors Truck Series	Kyle Busch Motorsports	23	1	4	7	563	12th
2021	NASCAR Pinty's Series	Wight Motorsports	3	2	2	2	125	21st
2021	NASCAR Camping World Truck Series	GMS Racing	7	0	1	2	150	28th
2022	NASCAR Pinty's Series	Ed Hakonson Racing	8	0	2	4	268	17th
2023	NASCAR Pinty's Series	Duroking Autosport	2	0	0	0	45	47th
2024	NASCAR Canada Series	Wight Motorsports Inc.	2	0	1	2	99	28th
2024	NASCAR Canada Series	Innovation Auto Sport	1	0	0	0	99	28th
2025	NASCAR Canada Series	Ed Hakonson Racing	1	0	1	1	40	40th
2026	NASCAR Canada Series	DJK Racing	1	0	1	1	39	49th

=== NASCAR ===
(key) (Bold – Pole position awarded by qualifying time. Italics – Pole position earned by points standings or practice time. * – Most laps led.)

==== Camping World Truck Series ====
NASCAR Camping World Truck Series results
Year	Team	No.	Make	1	2	3	4	5	6	7	8	9	10	11	12	13	14	15	16	17	18	19	20	21	22	23	NCWTC	Pts	Ref
2019	Kyle Busch Motorsports	46	Toyota	DAY	ATL	LVS	MAR; 14	TEX	DOV; 11	KAN	CLT	TEX								BRI; 12							32nd	135	
2019	DGR-Crosley	17	Toyota										IOW; 9	GTW	CHI	KEN	POC	ELD	MCH								32nd	135	
2019	DGR-Crosley	54	Toyota																		MSP; 10	LVS	TAL	MAR	PHO	HOM	32nd	135	
2020	Kyle Busch Motorsports	4	Toyota	DAY; 20	LVS; 30	CLT; 15	ATL; 18	HOM; 11	POC; 37	KEN; 13	TEX; 12	KAN; 16	KAN; 11	MCH; 7	DRC; 3	DOV; 19	GTW; 6	DAR; 6	RCH; 26	BRI; 18	LVS; 20	TAL; 1	KAN; 33	TEX; 4	MAR; 20	PHO; 5	12th	563	
2021	GMS Racing	24	Chevy	DAY; 23	DRC; 26	LVS; 30	ATL; 39	BRI; 3	RCH; 23	KAN; 8	DAR	COA	CLT	TEX	NSH	POC	KNX	GLN	GTW	DAR	BRI	LVS	TAL	MAR	PHO		28th	150	

==== K&N Pro Series East ====
NASCAR K&N Pro Series East results
Year	Team	No.	Make	1	2	3	4	5	6	7	8	9	10	11	12	NKNPSEC	Pts	Ref
2019	Bill McAnally Racing	50	Toyota	NSM	BRI; 9	SBO	SBO	MEM	NHA	IOW	GLN	BRI	GTW	NHA	DOV	34th	35	

==== Canada Series ====
NASCAR Canada Series results
Year	Team	No.	Make	1	2	3	4	5	6	7	8	9	10	11	12	13	14	NPSC	Pts	Ref
2019	Dumoulin Compétition	07	Dodge	MSP	JUK	ACD; 1*	TOR	SAS	SAS	EIR	CTR; 7	RIS	MSP	ASE	NHA	JUK		27th	85	
2021	Wight Motorsports	80	Chevy	SUN; 1	SUN; 1*	CTR; 14	ICAR	MSP	MSP	FLA	FLA	DEL	DEL					21st	125	
2022	Ed Hakonson Racing	8	Chevy	SUN; 2	MSP	ACD; 6	AVE; 8	TOR	EDM; 15	SAS; 15	SAS; 4	CTR	OSK; 21	ICAR	MSP	DEL; 14		17th	268	
2023	Duroking Autosport	12	Dodge	SUN	MSP	ACD	AVE	TOR	EIR	SAS	SAS	CTR; 22	OSK	OSK	ICAR; 21	MSP	DEL	47th	45	
2024	Innovation Auto Sport	48	Dodge	MSP	ACD; 20	AVE	RIS	RIS	OSK	SAS	EIR							28th	99	
2024	Wight Motorsports Inc.	7	Chevy									CTR; 3	ICAR	MSP	DEL			28th	99	
2024	Wight Motorsports Inc.	7	Dodge													AMS; 10		28th	99	
2025	Ed Hakonson Racing	7	Chevy	MSP	RIS	EDM	SAS	CMP	ACD	CTR; 4	ICAR	MSP	DEL	DEL	AMS			40th	40	
2026	DJK Racing	7	Dodge	MSP	ACD	ACD	RIS	AMS	AMS	CMP	EIR	EIR	CTR; 5	MAR	ICAR	MSP	DEL	49th	39	

=== ARCA Menards Series ===
(key) (Bold – Pole position awarded by qualifying time. Italics – Pole position earned by points standings or practice time. * – Most laps led.)

ARCA Menards Series results
Year	Team	No.	Make	1	2	3	4	5	6	7	8	9	10	11	12	13	14	15	16	17	18	19	20	AMSC	Pts	Ref
2017	Venturini Motorsports	25	Toyota	DAY	NSH; 33	SLM; 13	TAL	TOL	ELK	POC	MCH	MAD	IOW	IRP	POC	WIN; 10	ISF	ROA	DSF	SLM	CHI	KEN	KAN	51st	370	
2019	KBR Development	19	Chevy	DAY	FIF; 8	SLM	TAL	NSH	TOL	CLT														27th	615	
2019	KBR Development	28	Chevy								POC; 4	MCH	MAD	GTW	CHI	ELK	IOW	POC; 5	ISF	DSF	SLM	IRP	KAN	27th	615	

=== CARS Super Late Model Tour ===
(key)

CARS Super Late Model Tour results
Year	Team	No.	Make	1	2	3	4	5	6	7	8	9	10	11	12	13	CSLMTC	Pts	Ref
2016	David Gilliland	99	Ford	SNM; 3	ROU; 2	HCY; 1	TCM; 7	GRE; 5	ROU; 11	**CON**; 1*	**MYB**; 1	HCY; 3	SNM; 1				1st	307	
2017	David Gilliland	99	Ford	CON	DOM	DOM	HCY; 4	HCY; 1*		AND; 25	ROU	TCM	ROU; 9	HCY	CON	SBO; 5	10th	135	
2017	David Gilliland	99L	Ford						BRI; 15								10th	135	
2018	Kyle Busch Motorsports	51L	Toyota	**MYB**; 6				BRI; 1*									4th	203	
2018	Kyle Busch Motorsports	51	Toyota		NSH; 19	ROU; 4	HCY; 12		AND; 4	HCY; 15							4th	203	
2018	Kyle Busch Motorsports	18	Toyota								**ROU**; 5	SBO					4th	203	

^{*} Season still in progress
^{1} Ineligible for series points
