= Danny Bohn =

American racing driver (born 1988)

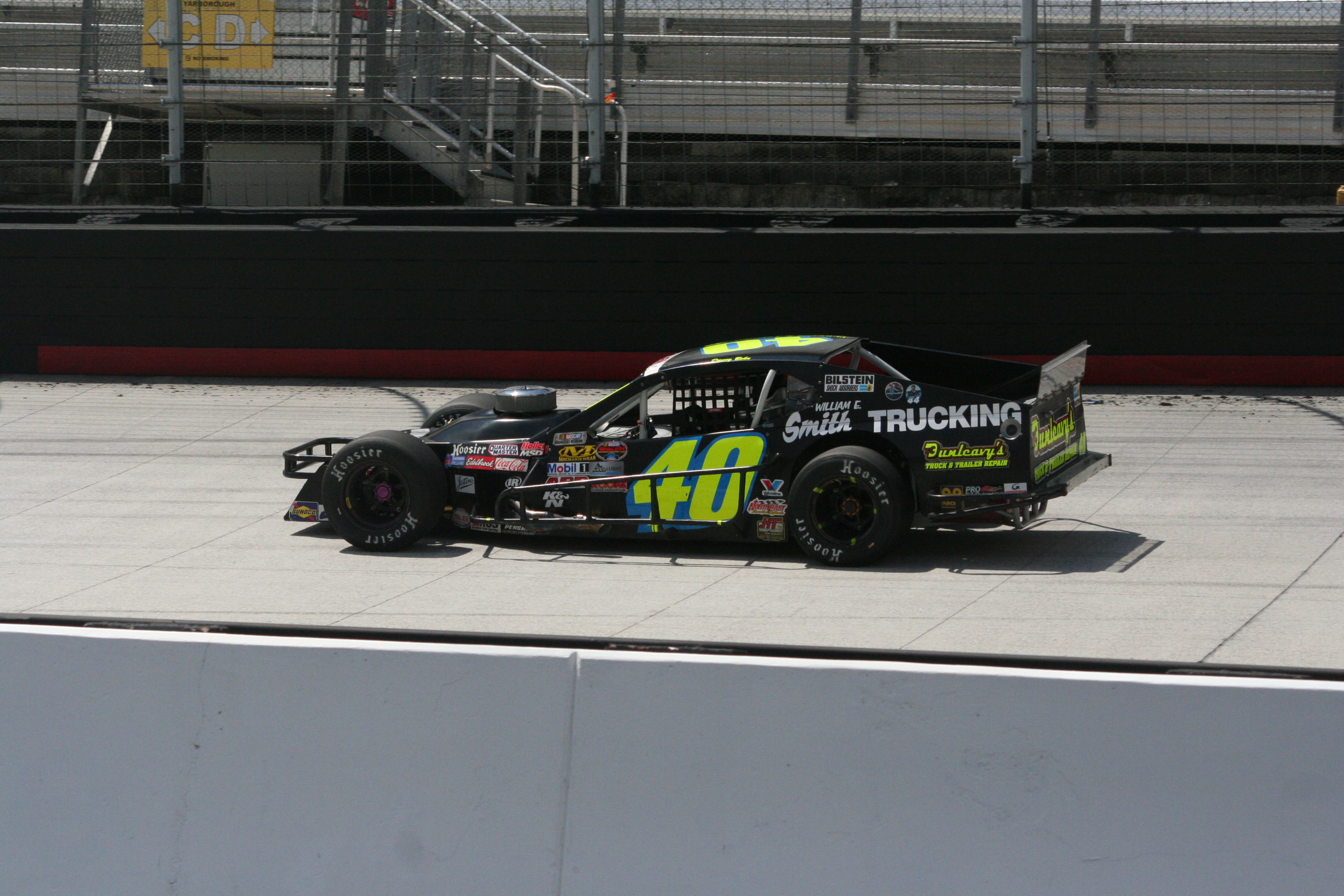
- Bohn's Modified car in 2016
- Born: Daniel Timothy Bohn; June 29, 1988 (age 38); Freehold Township, New Jersey, U.S.
- Achievements: 2014 Bowman Gray Stadium Modified Champion

NASCAR O'Reilly Auto Parts Series career
- 1 race run over 1 year
- 2021 position: 95th
- Best finish: 95th (2021)
- First race: 2021 Beef. It's What's for Dinner 300 (Daytona)
Wins	Top tens	Poles
0	0	0

NASCAR FedEx Freight Truck Series career
- 36 races run over 5 years
- 2024 position: 55th
- Best finish: 22nd (2021)
- First race: 2019 NASCAR Hall of Fame 200 (Martinsville)
- Last race: 2024 Love's RV Stop 225 (Talladega)
Wins	Top tens	Poles
0	5	0
- Statistics up to date as of November 8, 2024.

Daniel Timothy Bohn (born June 29, 1988) is an American professional stock car racing driver. He last competed part-time in the NASCAR Craftsman Truck Series, driving the No. 44 Chevrolet Silverado for Niece Motorsports.

== Racing career ==
=== Craftsman Truck Series ===
Bohn attempted the 2019 NASCAR Hall of Fame 200 at Martinsville Speedway. He started the race nineteenth, making his debut the next day, finishing eighth. His team, On Point Motorsports, later announced a two-race extension to close out the season. Bohn would have a disappointing run at ISM and Homestead finishing 27th at ISM after blowing a right-front tire early and finishing 25th at Homestead-Miami.

He returned to On Point in 2020, initially on a five-race schedule for the team starting at Atlanta Motor Speedway. NASCAR Cup Series driver Brennan Poole ran much of the season before exhausting his remaining starts in August, with Bohn taking over the No. 30 for the rest of the year starting at World Wide Technology Raceway.

On January 28, 2021, OPM announced that Bohn would be back with them in 2021 in the No. 30. The team retained his 2020 sponsor, North American Motor Car, for at least the season-opener at Daytona. The team stated that a full season would be possible if additional sponsorship were found.

=== Xfinity Series ===
On February 1, 2021, Big Machine Racing announced Bohn would make his NASCAR Xfinity Series debut in the season opener at Daytona International Speedway as the team's regular driver Jade Buford was not approved for the event.

== Motorsports career results ==
=== NASCAR ===
(key) (Bold – Pole position awarded by qualifying time. Italics – Pole position earned by points standings or practice time. * – Most laps led.)

==== Xfinity Series ====
NASCAR Xfinity Series results
Year	Team	No.	Make	1	2	3	4	5	6	7	8	9	10	11	12	13	14	15	16	17	18	19	20	21	22	23	24	25	26	27	28	29	30	31	32	33	NXSC	Pts	Ref
2021	Big Machine Racing	48	Chevy	DAY; 19	DRC	HOM	LVS	PHO	ATL	MAR	TAL	DAR	DOV	COA	CLT	MOH	TEX	NSH	POC	ROA	ATL	NHA	GLN	IRC	MCH	DAY	DAR	RCH	BRI	LVS	TAL	ROV	TEX	KAN	MAR	PHO	95th	0^{1}	

==== Craftsman Truck Series ====
NASCAR Craftsman Truck Series results
Year	Team	No.	Make	1	2	3	4	5	6	7	8	9	10	11	12	13	14	15	16	17	18	19	20	21	22	23	NCTC	Pts	Ref
2019	On Point Motorsports	30	Toyota	DAY	ATL	LVS	MAR	TEX	DOV	KAN	CLT	TEX	IOW	GTW	CHI	KEN	POC	ELD	MCH	BRI	MSP	LVS	TAL	MAR; 8	PHO; 27	HOM; 25	51st	53	
2020	On Point Motorsports	30	Toyota	DAY	LVS	CLT	ATL	HOM	POC	KEN	TEX	KAN	KAN	MCH	DRC	DOV	GTW; 16	DAR; 20	RCH; 33	BRI; 24	LVS; 25	TAL; 34	KAN; 21	TEX; 17	MAR; 7	PHO; 26	34th	150	
2021	On Point Motorsports	30	Toyota	DAY; 17	DRC; 30	LVS; 17	ATL; 28	BRD; 36	RCH; 20	KAN; 26	DAR; 18	COA	CLT; 24	TEX	NSH; 30	POC; 38	KNX; 10	GLN; 28	GTW; 36	DAR; 20	BRI; 33	LVS; 18	TAL; 8	MAR; 14	PHO; 28		22nd	263	
2022	Young's Motorsports	20	Chevy	DAY; 8	LVS	ATL	COA	MAR	BRD	DAR; 22	KAN	TEX	CLT	GTW	SON	KNX	NSH	MOH	POC	IRP	RCH	KAN	BRI	TAL	HOM	PHO	44th	44	
2023	Niece Motorsports	44	Chevy	DAY	LVS	ATL	COA	TEX	BRD	MAR	KAN	DAR	NWS	CLT	GTW	NSH	MOH	POC	RCH	IRP	MLW	KAN	BRI; DNQ	TAL	HOM	PHO	N/A	0	
2024	Niece Motorsports	44	Chevy	DAY	ATL	LVS	BRI	COA	MAR	TEX	KAN	DAR	NWS	CLT	GTW	NSH	POC	IRP	RCH	MLW	BRI	KAN	TAL; 17	HOM	MAR	PHO	55th	20	

^{*} Season still in progress
^{1} Ineligible for series points

==== Whelen Modified Tour ====
NASCAR Whelen Modified Tour results
Year	Car owner	No.	Make	1	2	3	4	5	6	7	8	9	10	11	12	13	14	15	16	NWMTC	Pts	Ref
2017	Frank Fleming	40	Chevy	MYR; 12	THO	STA	LGY; 8	THO	RIV	NHA	STA	THO	BRI	SEE	OSW	RIV	NHA	STA	THO	44th	68	
2019	Eddie Harvey	1	Chevy	MYR	SBO	TMP	STA	WAL; 27	SEE	TMP	RIV	NHA	STA	TMP	OSW	RIV	NHA	STA	TMP	68th	17	
2022	Scott Branick	65	N/A	NSM	RCH	RIV	LEE	JEN	MND	RIV	WAL; 24	NHA	CLM	TMP	LGY	OSW	RIV	TMP	MAR	66th	20	
2025	Christopher Fleming	48	N/A	NSM	THO	NWS	SEE	RIV	WMM	LMP	MON	MON	THO	RCH; 11	OSW	NHA	RIV	THO		46th	67	
2025	Michael Smith	25	N/A																MAR; 11	46th	67	
2026	Michael Smith	25	N/A	NSM	MAR; 16	THO	SEE	RIV	OXF	SEE	CLM	WMM	MON	THO	NHA	STA	OSW	RIV	THO	52nd	28	

==== Whelen Southern Modified Tour ====
NASCAR Whelen Southern Modified Tour results
Year	Car owner	No.	Make	1	2	3	4	5	6	7	8	9	10	11	12	13	14	NSWMTC	Pts	Ref
2012	Eddie Bohn	65	Chevy	CRW; 12	CRW; 5	SBO; 3	CRW; 11	CRW; 3	BGS; 10	BRI; 2	**LGY**; 15	THO; 7	CRW; 1	CLT; 4				2nd	415	
2013	Eddie Bohn	65	Chevy	CRW; 20	SNM; 8	SBO; 13	CRW; 4	CRW; 8	BGS; 4	BRI	LGY; 5	CRW; 7	CRW; 6	SNM; 9	CLT; 5			9th	395	
2014	Eddie Bohn	65	Chevy	CRW; 6	SNM; 12	**SBO**; 3	LGY; 15	CRW; 4	**BGS**; 1*	BRI; 6	LGY; 7	CRW; 5	**SBO**; 6*	SNM; 7	**CRW**; 4	CRW; 1		5th	542	
2014	Eddie Bohn	65	Pontiac														CLT; 9	5th	542	
2015	Eddie Bohn	65	Chevy	CRW	CRW	SBO; 5	LGY	CRW	BGS; 1	BRI	LGY	SBO; 11	CLT; 3					17th	160	
2016	Frank Fleming	40	Chevy	**CRW**; 3	CON; 10	SBO; 5	**CRW**; 3	CRW; 8	BGS; 11		ECA; 2	**SBO**; 4*	CRW; 5	CLT; 4				4th	432	
2016	Frank Fleming	40S	Chevy							BRI; 3								4th	432	

=== SMART Modified Tour ===
SMART Modified Tour results
Year	Car owner	No.	Make	1	2	3	4	5	6	7	8	9	10	11	12	13	14	SMTC	Pts	Ref
2021	Buddy Ellis	24	N/A	CRW	FLO	SBO	FCS	CRW; 7	DIL; 3	CAR	CRW	DOM; 5	PUL	HCY; 5	ACE			15th	106	
2022	N/A	51	N/A	FLO	SNM	CRW	SBO; 7	FCS	CRW	NWS	NWS	CAR						33rd	36	
2022	Eddie Bohn	65	N/A										DOM; 19	HCY	TRI	PUL		33rd	36	
2023	Buddy Ellis	24	N/A	FLO	CRW	SBO	HCY	FCS	CRW	ACE	CAR; 6	PUL	TRI; 14	SBO	ROU; 6			28th	101	
2024	Buddy Ellis	24	N/A	FLO; 7	CRW; 5	SBO; 19	TRI; 10	ROU; 12	HCY; 12	FCS; 3	CRW; 2	**JAC**; 2	CAR; 1	CRW; 5	DOM; 3	SBO; 5	NWS; 25	5th	516	
2025	Michael Smith	26	N/A	FLO	AND	SBO	ROU	HCY	FCS; 4									13th	328	
2025	Michael Smith	25	N/A							CRW; 1**	CPS; 4	CAR; 5*	CRW; 5	DOM; 15	FCS; 1*	TRI; 4	NWS; 28	13th	328	
2026	Michael Smith	25	N/A	FLO; 3	AND; 1*	SBO; 16	DOM; 17	HCY; 1	WKS; 1	FCR; 5	CRW; 2	PUL; 9	CAR; 3	**ROU**; 22	TRI; 5	NWS; 3		3rd	633	
