= 2021 Bucked Up 200 =

Race details
- Race 3 of 22 in the 2021 NASCAR Camping World Truck Series
- Date: March 5, 2021
- Location: Las Vegas Motor Speedway, Las Vegas, Nevada
- Course: Permanent racing facility
- Course length: 1.5 miles (2.414 km)
- Distance: 134 laps, 201 mi (323.478 km)
- Average speed: 96.134 miles per hour (154.713 km/h)

Pole position
Driver	Ben Rhodes	ThorSport Racing
- Grid positions set by competition-based formula

Most laps led
Driver	John Hunter Nemechek	Kyle Busch Motorsports
- Laps: 94

Winner
No. 4	John Hunter Nemechek	Kyle Busch Motorsports

Television in the United States
- Network: Fox Sports 1
- Announcers: Vince Welch, Michael Waltrip, Austin Dillon

Radio in the United States
- Radio: MRN

The 2021 Bucked Up 200 was the 3rd stock car race of the 2021 NASCAR Camping World Truck Series and the 25th iteration of the event. It was held on Friday, March 5, 2021 at Las Vegas Motor Speedway in North Las Vegas, Nevada. John Hunter Nemechek, driving for Kyle Busch Motorsports, would win the race leading 94 laps in a fierce battle with owner of Kyle Busch Motorsports, Kyle Busch, his first of the season and his 7th overall in the NASCAR Camping World Truck Series. Kyle Busch for Kyle Busch Motorsports and Austin Hill for Hattori Racing Enterprises would garner 2nd and 3rd, respectively.

The race is known for the start of CEO of Camping World Marcus Lemonis' challenge of sponsorship. The challenge would be that Marcus and Camping World would sponsor any unsponsored car, and give them a guaranteed $15,000. However, if the team got a Top 10, it would turn into $25,000, a Top 5 would earn $35,000, and a win would earn them $50,000. 10 teams would take up the sponsorship: The #2 of Sheldon Creed, The #3 of Jordan Anderson, the #6 of Norm Benning, the #9 of Grant Enfinger, the #24 of Raphaël Lessard, the #33 of Jesse Iwuji, the #34 of B. J. McLeod, the #41 of Dawson Cram, the #56 of Tyler Hill, and the #75 of Parker Kligerman. Only two would not get the minimum $15,000; Parker Kligerman who finished 8th, and Grant Enfinger who finished 7th, both earning $25,000.

== Background ==
The layout of Las Vegas Motor Speedway, the venue where the race was held.

#	Driver	Team	Make
1	Hailie Deegan	David Gilliland Racing	Ford
2	Sheldon Creed	GMS Racing	Chevrolet
02	Kris Wright	Young's Motorsports	Chevrolet
3	Jordan Anderson	Jordan Anderson Racing	Chevrolet
4	John Hunter Nemechek	Kyle Busch Motorsports	Toyota
04	Cory Roper	Roper Racing	Ford
6	Norm Benning	Norm Benning Racing	Chevrolet
9	Grant Enfinger	CR7 Motorsports	Chevrolet
10	Jennifer Jo Cobb	Jennifer Jo Cobb Racing	Chevrolet
12	Tate Fogleman	Young's Motorsports	Chevrolet
13	Johnny Sauter	ThorSport Racing	Toyota
15	Tanner Gray	David Gilliland Racing	Ford
16	Austin Hill	Hattori Racing Enterprises	Toyota
17	David Gilliland	David Gilliland Racing	Ford
18	Chandler Smith	Kyle Busch Motorsports	Toyota
19	Derek Kraus	McAnally–Hilgemann Racing	Toyota
20	Spencer Boyd	Young's Motorsports	Chevrolet
21	Zane Smith	GMS Racing	Chevrolet
22	Austin Wayne Self	AM Racing	Chevrolet
23	Chase Purdy	GMS Racing	Chevrolet
24	Raphaël Lessard	GMS Racing	Chevrolet
25	Timothy Peters	Rackley W.A.R.	Chevrolet
26	Tyler Ankrum	GMS Racing	Chevrolet
30	Danny Bohn	On Point Motorsports	Toyota
32	Bret Holmes	Bret Holmes Racing	Chevrolet
33	Jesse Iwuji	Reaume Brothers Racing	Chevrolet
34	B. J. McLeod	Reaume Brothers Racing	Toyota
38	Todd Gilliland	Front Row Motorsports	Ford
40	Ryan Truex	Niece Motorsports	Chevrolet
41	Dawson Cram	Cram Racing Enterprises	Chevrolet
42	Carson Hocevar	Niece Motorsports	Chevrolet
44	Conor Daly	Niece Motorsports	Chevrolet
45	Brett Moffitt	Niece Motorsports	Chevrolet
51	Kyle Busch	Kyle Busch Motorsports	Toyota
52	Stewart Friesen	Halmar Friesen Racing	Toyota
56	Tyler Hill	Hill Motorsports	Chevrolet
75	Parker Kligerman	Henderson Motorsports	Chevrolet
88	Matt Crafton	ThorSport Racing	Toyota
98	Christian Eckes	ThorSport Racing	Toyota
99	Ben Rhodes	ThorSport Racing	Toyota
Official entry list

== Starting lineup ==
The field was set of a competition-based formula based on the previous race. As a result, Ben Rhodes of ThorSport Racing, who won the previous race, would achieve the pole.

Pos.	#	Driver	Team	Make
1	99	Ben Rhodes	ThorSport Racing	Toyota
2	2	Sheldon Creed	GMS Racing	Chevrolet
3	4	John Hunter Nemechek	Kyle Busch Motorsports	Toyota
4	88	Matt Crafton	ThorSport Racing	Toyota
5	98	Christian Eckes	ThorSport Racing	Toyota
6	38	Todd Gilliland	Front Row Motorsports	Ford
7	18	Chandler Smith	Kyle Busch Motorsports	Toyota
8	19	Derek Kraus	McAnally–Hilgemann Racing	Toyota
9	52	Stewart Friesen	Halmar Friesen Racing	Toyota
10	42	Carson Hocevar	Niece Motorsports	Chevrolet
11	13	Johnny Sauter	ThorSport Racing	Toyota
12	22	Austin Wayne Self	AM Racing	Chevrolet
13	24	Raphaël Lessard	GMS Racing	Chevrolet
14	17	David Gilliland	David Gilliland Racing	Ford
15	02	Kris Wright	Young's Motorsports	Chevrolet
16	26	Tyler Ankrum	GMS Racing	Chevrolet
17	45	Brett Moffitt	Niece Motorsports	Chevrolet
18	9	Grant Enfinger	CR7 Motorsports	Chevrolet
19	25	Timothy Peters	Rackley W.A.R.	Chevrolet
20	12	Tate Fogleman	Young's Motorsports	Chevrolet
21	23	Chase Purdy	GMS Racing	Chevrolet
22	15	Tanner Gray	David Gilliland Racing	Ford
23	41	Dawson Cram	Cram Racing Enterprises	Chevrolet
24	40	Ryan Truex	Niece Motorsports	Chevrolet
25	56	Tyler Hill	Hill Motorsports	Chevrolet
26	30	Danny Bohn	On Point Motorsports	Toyota
27	04	Cory Roper	Roper Racing	Ford
28	3	Jordan Anderson	Jordan Anderson Racing	Chevrolet
29	51	Kyle Busch	Kyle Busch Motorsports	Toyota
30	1	Hailie Deegan	David Gilliland Racing	Ford
31	16	Austin Hill	Hattori Racing Enterprises	Toyota
32	21	Zane Smith	GMS Racing	Chevrolet
33	20	Spencer Boyd	Young's Motorsports	Chevrolet
34	10	Jennifer Jo Cobb	Jennifer Jo Cobb Racing	Chevrolet
35	6	Norm Benning	Norm Benning Racing	Chevrolet
36	44	Conor Daly	Niece Motorsports	Chevrolet
37	33	Jesse Iwuji	Reaume Brothers Racing	Chevrolet
38	32	Bret Holmes	Bret Holmes Racing	Chevrolet
39	34	B. J. McLeod	Reaume Brothers Racing	Toyota
40	75	Parker Kligerman	Henderson Motorsports	Chevrolet
Starting lineup sheet

== Race results ==
Stage 1 Laps: 30

Fin.	#	Driver	Team	Make	Pts
1	4	John Hunter Nemechek	Kyle Busch Motorsports	Toyota	10
2	2	Sheldon Creed	GMS Racing	Chevrolet	9
3	88	Matt Crafton	ThorSport Racing	Toyota	8
4	51	Kyle Busch	Kyle Busch Motorsports	Toyota	0
5	52	Stewart Friesen	Halmar Friesen Racing	Toyota	6
6	98	Christian Eckes	ThorSport Racing	Toyota	5
7	17	David Gilliland	David Gilliland Racing	Ford	4
8	99	Ben Rhodes	ThorSport Racing	Toyota	3
9	18	Chandler Smith	Kyle Busch Motorsports	Toyota	2
10	9	Grant Enfinger	CR7 Motorsports	Chevrolet	1

Stage 2 Laps: 30

Fin.	#	Driver	Team	Make	Pts
1	51	Kyle Busch	Kyle Busch Motorsports	Toyota	0
2	4	John Hunter Nemechek	Kyle Busch Motorsports	Toyota	9
3	52	Stewart Friesen	Halmar Friesen Racing	Toyota	8
4	88	Matt Crafton	ThorSport Racing	Toyota	7
5	99	Ben Rhodes	ThorSport Racing	Toyota	6
6	16	Austin Hill	Hattori Racing Enterprises	Toyota	5
7	9	Grant Enfinger	CR7 Motorsports	Chevrolet	4
8	17	David Gilliland	David Gilliland Racing	Ford	3
9	98	Christian Eckes	ThorSport Racing	Toyota	2
10	26	Tyler Ankrum	GMS Racing	Chevrolet	1

Stage 3 Laps: 74

Fin.	St	#	Driver	Team	Make	Laps	Led	Status	Pts
1	3	4	John Hunter Nemechek	Kyle Busch Motorsports	Toyota	134	94	running	59
2	29	51	Kyle Busch	Kyle Busch Motorsports	Toyota	134	16	running	0
3	31	16	Austin Hill	Hattori Racing Enterprises	Toyota	134	0	running	39
4	9	52	Stewart Friesen	Halmar Friesen Racing	Toyota	134	4	running	47
5	4	88	Matt Crafton	ThorSport Racing	Toyota	134	0	running	47
6	32	21	Zane Smith	GMS Racing	Chevrolet	134	0	running	31
7	18	9	Grant Enfinger	CR7 Motorsports	Chevrolet	134	0	running	35
8	40	75	Parker Kligerman	Henderson Motorsports	Chevrolet	134	0	running	29
9	5	98	Christian Eckes	ThorSport Racing	Toyota	134	0	running	35
10	1	99	Ben Rhodes	ThorSport Racing	Toyota	134	0	running	36
11	17	45	Brett Moffitt	Niece Motorsports	Chevrolet	134	13	running	26
12	22	15	Tanner Gray	David Gilliland Racing	Ford	134	0	running	25
13	6	38	Todd Gilliland	Front Row Motorsports	Ford	134	0	running	24
14	12	22	Austin Wayne Self	AM Racing	Chevrolet	134	0	running	23
15	11	13	Johnny Sauter	ThorSport Racing	Toyota	134	0	running	22
16	19	25	Timothy Peters	Rackley W.A.R.	Chevrolet	134	0	running	21
17	26	30	Danny Bohn	On Point Motorsports	Toyota	134	0	running	20
18	2	2	Sheldon Creed	GMS Racing	Chevrolet	134	7	running	28
19	7	18	Chandler Smith	Kyle Busch Motorsports	Toyota	134	0	running	20
20	20	12	Tate Fogleman	Young's Motorsports	Chevrolet	134	0	running	17
21	23	41	Dawson Cram	Cram Racing Enterprises	Chevrolet	134	0	running	16
22	33	20	Spencer Boyd	Young's Motorsports	Chevrolet	134	0	running	15
23	21	23	Chase Purdy	GMS Racing	Chevrolet	134	0	running	14
24	10	42	Carson Hocevar	Niece Motorsports	Chevrolet	133	0	running	13
25	15	02	Kris Wright	Young's Motorsports	Chevrolet	132	0	running	12
26	39	34	B. J. McLeod	Reaume Brothers Racing	Toyota	132	0	running	0
27	28	3	Jordan Anderson	Jordan Anderson Racing	Chevrolet	132	0	running	0
28	30	1	Hailie Deegan	David Gilliland Racing	Ford	130	0	running	9
29	34	10	Jennifer Jo Cobb	Jennifer Jo Cobb Racing	Chevrolet	130	0	running	8
30	13	24	Raphaël Lessard	GMS Racing	Chevrolet	130	0	running	7
31	37	33	Jesse Iwuji	Reaume Brothers Racing	Chevrolet	129	0	running	6
32	8	19	Derek Kraus	McAnally–Hilgemann Racing	Toyota	126	0	running	5
33	35	6	Norm Benning	Norm Benning Racing	Chevrolet	123	0	running	4
34	16	26	Tyler Ankrum	GMS Racing	Chevrolet	122	0	accident	4
35	25	56	Tyler Hill	Hill Motorsports	Chevrolet	112	0	accident	2
36	27	04	Cory Roper	Roper Racing	Ford	111	0	accident	1
37	38	32	Bret Holmes	Bret Holmes Racing	Chevrolet	106	0	dvp	1
38	24	40	Ryan Truex	Niece Motorsports	Chevrolet	103	0	dvp	1
39	14	17	David Gilliland	David Gilliland Racing	Ford	96	0	accident	8
40	36	44	Conor Daly	Niece Motorsports	Chevrolet	68	0	accident	1
Official race results

Previous race: 2021 BrakeBest Brake Pads 159	NASCAR Camping World Truck Series; 2021 season	Next race: 2021 Fr8Auctions 200
