= Chase Purdy =

American racing driver (born 1999)

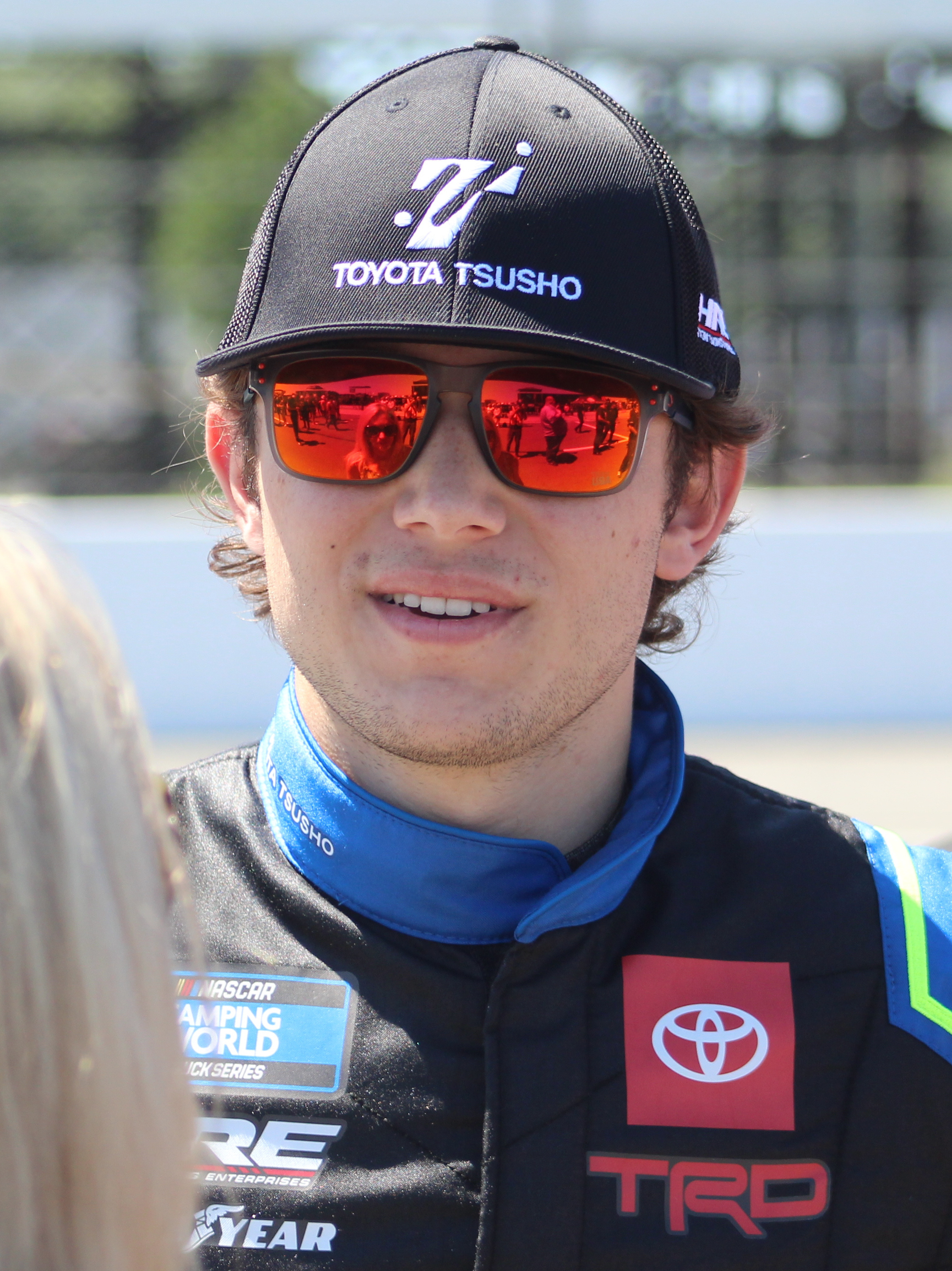
- Purdy at Pocono Raceway in 2022
- Born: Charles Russell Purdy III; November 11, 1999 (age 27); Tuscaloosa, Alabama, U.S.
- Achievements: 2018 Snowflake 100 Winner; 2018 Dixieland 250 Winner

NASCAR FedEx Freight Truck Series career
- 98 races run over 6 years
- 2024 position: 15th
- Best finish: 11th (2023)
- First race: 2018 Texas Roadhouse 200 (Martinsville)
- Last race: 2024 NASCAR Craftsman Truck Series Championship Race (Phoenix)
Wins	Top tens	Poles
0	22	3

ARCA Menards Series career
- 23 races run over 2 years
- Best finish: 4th (2018)
- First race: 2017 Winchester ARCA 200 (Winchester)
- Last race: 2018 Kansas ARCA 150 (Kansas)
Wins	Top tens	Poles
0	16	0

ARCA Menards Series East career
- 14 races run over 1 year
- Best finish: 4th (2017)
- First race: 2017 Jet Tools 150 (New Smyrna)
- Last race: 2017 National Fallen Firefighters Association 125 (Dover)
Wins	Top tens	Poles
0	8	4
- Statistics up to date as of December 11, 2024.

Charles Russell "Chase" Purdy III (born November 11, 1999) is an American former professional stock car racing driver. He most recently competed full-time in the NASCAR Craftsman Truck Series, driving the No. 77 Chevrolet Silverado for Spire Motorsports.

He competed for MDM Motorsports in the Truck and ARCA Racing Series, David Gilliland Racing in the NASCAR K&N Pro Series East, and Anthony Campi Racing in super late model racing. Purdy was named to the 2017–2018 and 2018–2019 NASCAR Next classes.

== Racing career ==
Purdy first raced in go-karts in his youth. He later moved to Bandolero cars, Legend cars, Late Model Stock cars, and Super late model cars, teaming up with former NASCAR driver David Gilliland and his team in SLMs.

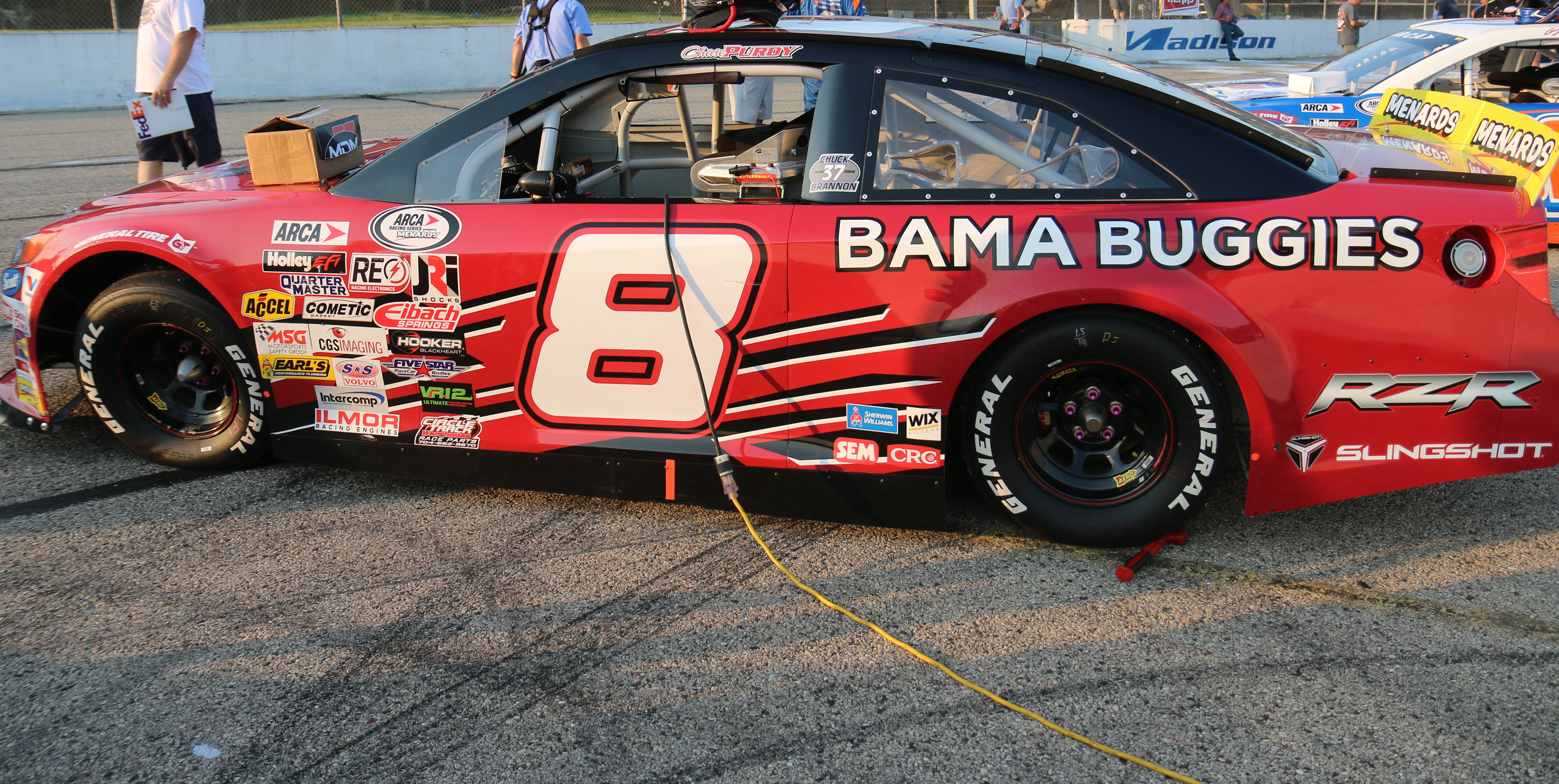
Purdy's No. 8 ARCA car in 2018 at Madison

Purdy was the 2016 NASCAR Whelen All-American Series national rookie of the year. He finished fourth in his debut NASCAR K&N Pro Series East season in 2017.

Purdy began driving full-time in the ARCA Racing Series in 2018. Purdy finished fourth in the season-long points tally, but did not break into Victory Lane. He also raced ten Super Late model events that year, including traveling across the United States to finish sixth in the Slinger Nationals at Slinger Super Speedway in Wisconsin. Purdy raced in his first ARCA Midwest Tour race at Wisconsin International Raceway and won the Dixieland 250 in his first appearance at the D-shaped 1/2 mile track. In the summer of 2018, Purdy's backers told him that they would not return for 2019, leaving his racing career in limbo. In his final late model race of 2018, Purdy won the Snowflake 100 at Five Flags Speedway.

On October 17, 2018, it was announced that Purdy would make his NASCAR Camping World Truck Series debut at Martinsville, driving the No. 99 truck for MDM Motorsports. He started 27th and finished 21st, and raced again in the Truck Series two weeks later at ISM Raceway, where he started 19th and finished 13th.

Purdy could not find a ride in NASCAR or ARCA for the 2019 season (MDM closed down after the 2018 season) and did not end up racing that year. He spent the year focusing on his studies at the University of Mississippi. He attended the 2019 fall Talladega race weekend as a fan and connected with people in the garage for the Truck Series race to try to get a ride again.

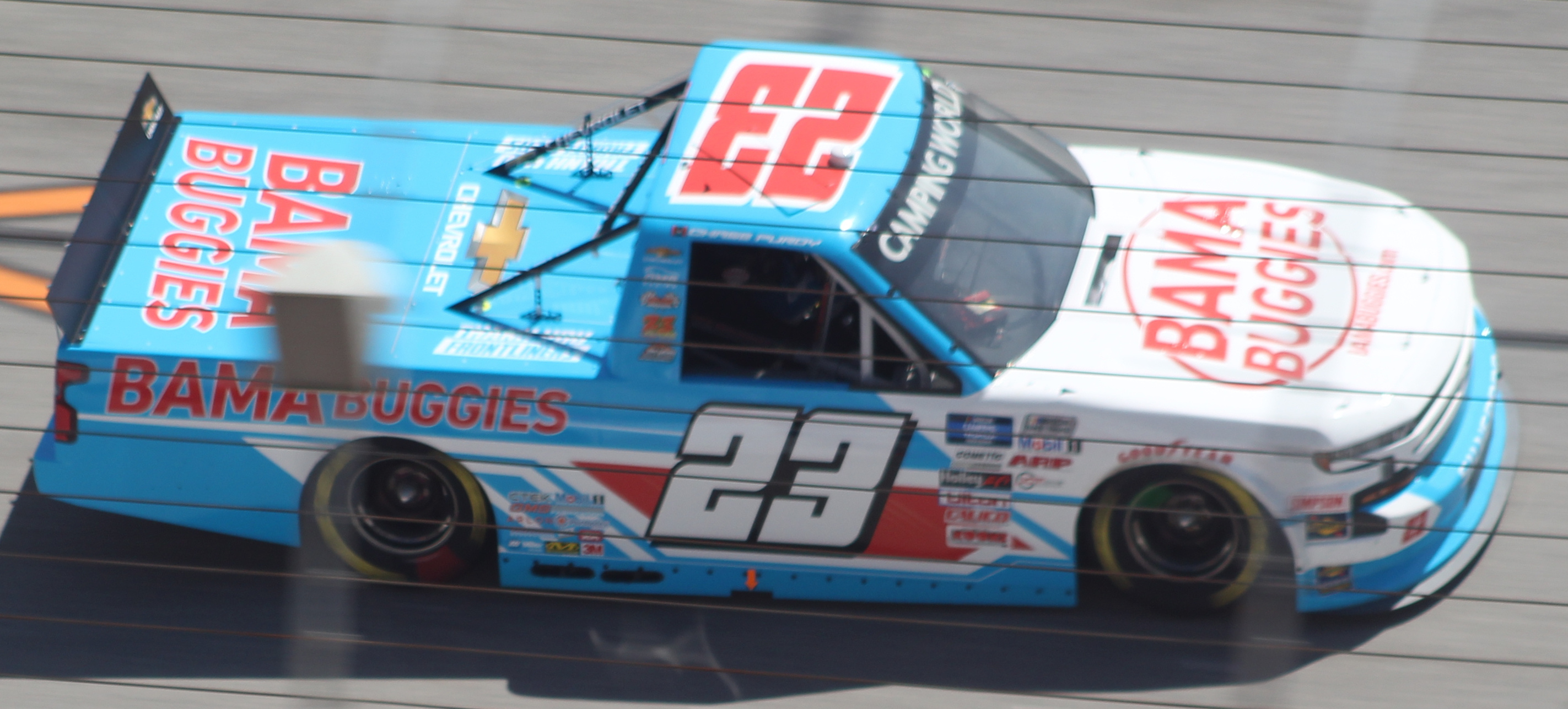
Purdy's No. 23 truck in 2021 at Atlanta

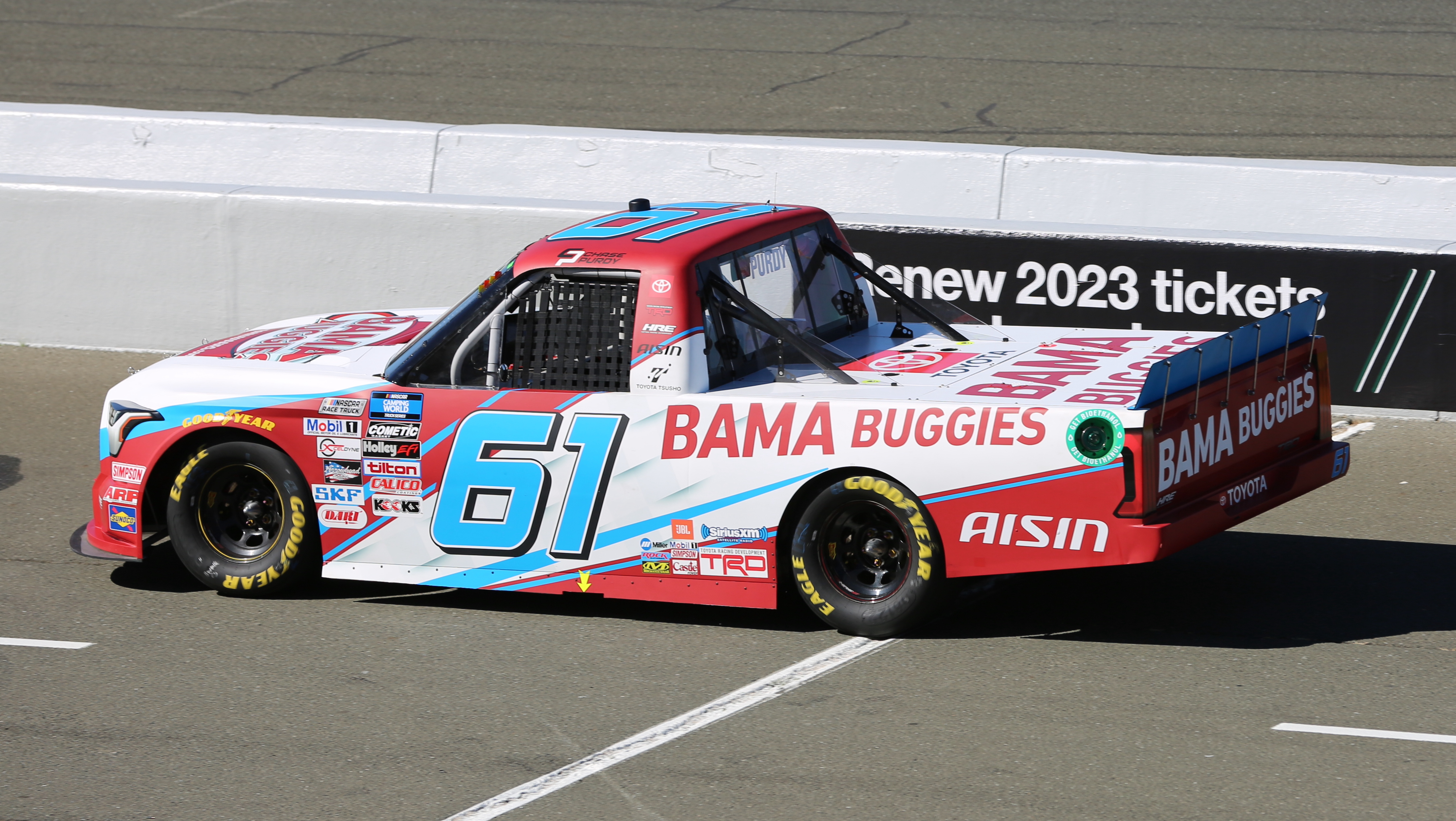
Purdy's No. 61 truck at Sonoma Raceway in 2022

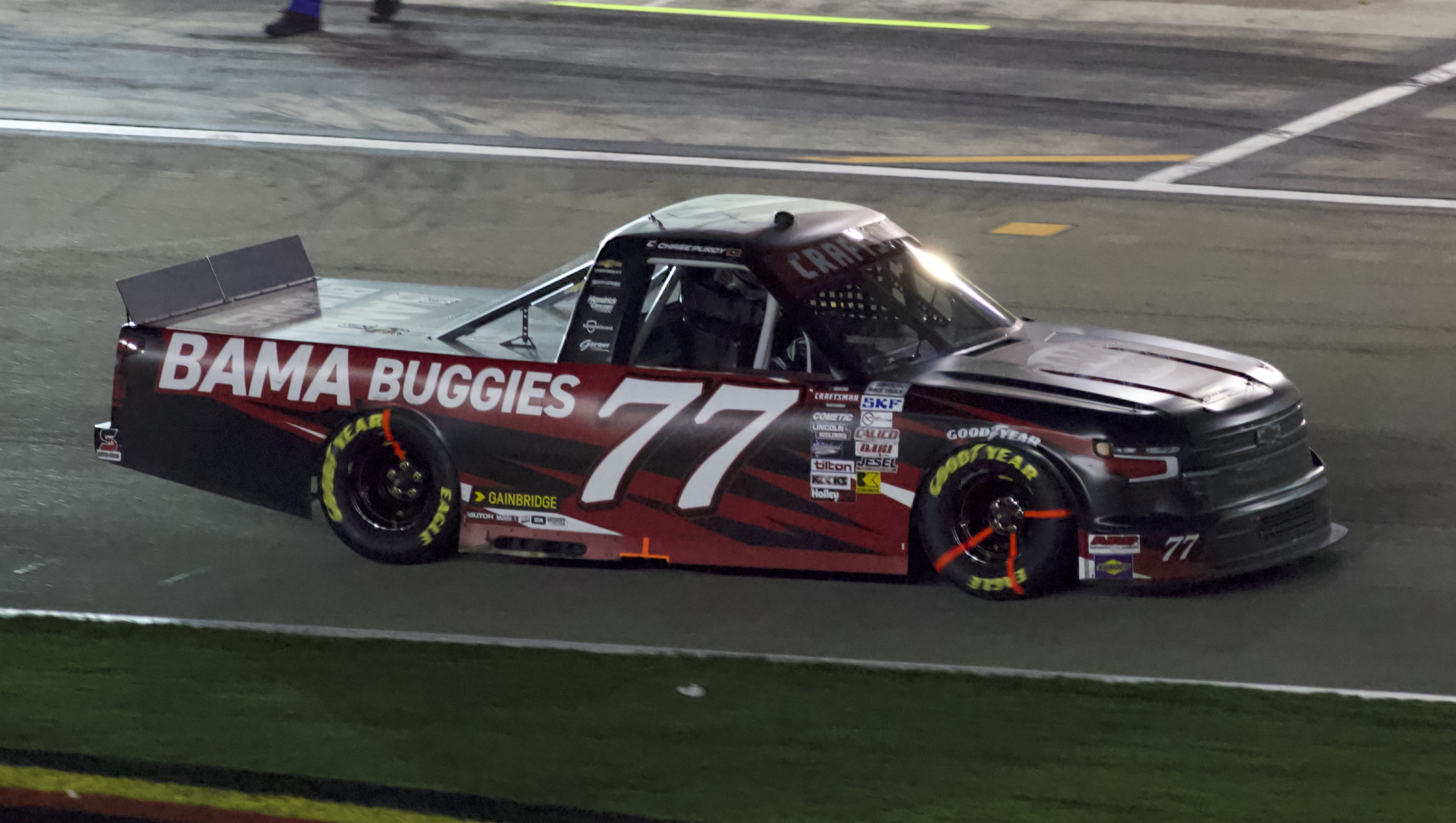
Purdy's No. 77 truck at Las Vegas Motor Speedway in 2024.

Purdy returned to the series in 2020, joining GMS Racing for a seven-race schedule in the No. 24 at Pocono Raceway, Kentucky Speedway, both Kansas Speedway events, Las Vegas Motor Speedway, Talladega Superspeedway, and Texas Motor Speedway.

In 2021, Purdy became a full-time driver for GMS in the Truck Series, replacing Brett Moffitt in the team's No. 23 truck.

On October 1, 2021, GMS announced that Grant Enfinger would drive the No. 23 truck full-time in 2022. Purdy moved to Hattori Racing Enterprises and the No. 61 truck.

Purdy moved to Kyle Busch Motorsports in 2023 driving their No. 4 Chevrolet. On September 8, 2023, Purdy scored his first career Truck Series pole in the Kansas playoff race.

In 2024, Purdy moved to Spire Motorsports in the No. 77 Chevrolet after KBM closed and had its assets purchased by Spire after the previous season ended.

Before the 2024 season-finale at Phoenix, Purdy indicated that he did not have a deal to race in 2025 for Spire or any other teams.

== Personal life ==
Purdy was born in Tuscaloosa, Alabama and raised in Meridian, Mississippi. He attended Lamar School and Cox Mill High School. He attended the University of Mississippi and was a Phi Delta Theta Fraternity member. He majored in finance with a minor in accounting.

== Motorsports career results ==
=== Racing career summary ===
Season	Series	Team	Races	Wins	Top 5	Top 10	Points	Position
2016	CARS Super Late Model Tour	David Gilliland Racing	2	0	0	1	46	35th
2016	CARS Late Model Stock Car Tour	Lee McCall	5	0	1	3	115	14th
2017	CARS Super Late Model Tour	David Gilliland Racing	4	0	2	4	113	13th
2017	NASCAR K&N Pro Series East	David Gilliland Racing	14	0	5	8	515	4th
2017	ARCA Racing Series	Mason Mitchell Motorsports	3	0	0	2	540	39th
2018	ARCA Racing Series	MDM Motorsports	20	0	10	14	4510	4th
2018	NASCAR Camping World Truck Series	MDM Motorsports	2	0	0	0	40	53rd
2020	NASCAR Gander Outdoors Truck Series	GMS Racing	7	0	0	1	118	38th
2021	CARS Late Model Stock Car Tour	GMS Racing	1	0	0	0	20	46th
2021	NASCAR Camping World Truck Series	GMS Racing	21	0	0	2	311	19th
2022	NASCAR Camping World Truck Series	Hattori Racing Enterprises	22	0	0	2	450	16th
2023	NASCAR Craftsman Truck Series	Kyle Busch Motorsports	23	0	3	11	582	11th
2024	NASCAR Craftsman Truck Series	Spire Motorsports	23	0	2	6	513	15th

=== NASCAR ===
(key) (Bold – Pole position awarded by qualifying time. Italics – Pole position earned by points standings or practice time. * – Most laps led. ** – All laps led.)

==== Craftsman Truck Series ====
NASCAR Craftsman Truck Series results
Year	Team	No.	Make	1	2	3	4	5	6	7	8	9	10	11	12	13	14	15	16	17	18	19	20	21	22	23	NCTC	Pts	Ref
2018	MDM Motorsports	99	Chevy	DAY	ATL	LVS	MAR	DOV	KAN	CLT	TEX	IOW	GTW	CHI	KEN	ELD	POC	MCH	BRI	MSP	LVS	TAL	MAR; 21	TEX	PHO; 13	HOM	53rd	40	
2020	GMS Racing	24	Chevy	DAY	LVS	CLT	ATL	HOM	POC; 21	KEN; 31	TEX	KAN; 15	KAN; 10	MCH	DRC	DOV	GTW	DAR	RCH	BRI	LVS; 27	TAL; 32	KAN	TEX; 12	MAR	PHO	38th	118	
2021	GMS Racing	23	Chevy	DAY; 29	DRC; 22	LVS; 23	ATL; 24	BRD; 18	RCH; 28	KAN; 25	DAR; 36	COA; 27	CLT; 34	TEX; 17	NSH; 15	POC; 15	KNX; 33	GLN	GTW; 6	DAR; 15	BRI; 30	LVS; 13	TAL; 9	MAR; 40	PHO; 16		19th	311	
2022	Hattori Racing Enterprises	61	Toyota	DAY; DNQ	LVS; 14	ATL; 14	COA; 16	MAR; 29	BRD; 13	DAR; 35	KAN; 13	TEX; 21	CLT; 15	GTW; 10	SON; 15	KNX; 20	NSH; 13	MOH; 13	POC; 11	IRP; 27	RCH; 14	KAN; 25	BRI; 30	TAL; 7	HOM; 16	PHO; 19	16th	450	
2023	Kyle Busch Motorsports	4	Chevy	DAY; 17	LVS; 8	ATL; 7	COA; 27	TEX; 2	BRD; 28	MAR; 10	KAN; 33	DAR; 32	NWS; 8	CLT; 16	GTW; 5	NSH; 6	MOH; 13	POC; 18	RCH; 22	IRP; 14	MLW; 6	**KAN**; 14	BRI; 8	**TAL**; 28	HOM; 10	PHO; 3	11th	582	
2024	Spire Motorsports	77	Chevy	DAY; 28	ATL; 15	LVS; 16	BRI; 33	COA; 22	MAR; 3	TEX; 25	**KAN**; 28	DAR; 6	NWS; 24	CLT; 13	GTW; 6	NSH; 21	POC; 6	IRP; 13	RCH; 20	MLW; 23	BRI; 7	KAN; 11	TAL; 25	HOM; 26	MAR; 3	PHO; 12	15th	513	

==== K&N Pro Series East ====
NASCAR K&N Pro Series East results
Year	Team	No.	Make	1	2	3	4	5	6	7	8	9	10	11	12	13	14	NKNPSEC	Pts	Ref
2017	David Gilliland Racing	17	Toyota	NSM; 8	GRE; 11	BRI; 12	SBO; 2	SBO; 11	**MEM**; 13	**BLN**; 2	**TMP**; 7	**NHA**; 2	IOW; 2	GLN; 15	LGY; 2	NJM; 6	DOV; 15	4th	515	

=== ARCA Racing Series ===
(key) (Bold – Pole position awarded by qualifying time. Italics – Pole position earned by points standings or practice time. * – Most laps led.)

ARCA Racing Series results
Year	Team	No.	Make	1	2	3	4	5	6	7	8	9	10	11	12	13	14	15	16	17	18	19	20	ARSC	Pts	Ref
2017	Mason Mitchell Motorsports	78	Chevy	DAY	NSH	SLM	TAL	TOL	ELK	POC	MCH	MAD	IOW	IRP	POC	WIN; 7	ISF	ROA	DSF	SLM; 6	CHI			39th	540	
2017	Mason Mitchell Motorsports	88	Chevy																			KEN; 17	KAN	39th	540	
2018	MDM Motorsports	8	Toyota	DAY; 21	NSH; 7	SLM; 5	TAL; 25	TOL; 5	CLT; 24	POC; 9	MCH; 13	MAD; 4	GTW; 2	CHI; 5	IOW; 3	ELK; 14	POC; 3	ISF; 18	BLN; 8	DSF; 8	SLM; 3	IRP; 4	KAN; 5	4th	4510	

=== CARS Late Model Stock Car Tour ===
(key) (Bold – Pole position awarded by qualifying time. Italics – Pole position earned by points standings or practice time. * – Most laps led. ** – All laps led.)

CARS Late Model Stock Car Tour results
Year	Team	No.	Make	1	2	3	4	5	6	7	8	9	10	11	12	13	CLMSCTC	Pts	Ref
2016	Lee McCall	41	Ford	SNM; 13	ROU; 7	HCY; 18	TCM	GRE; 5	ROU; 7	CON	MYB	HCY	SNM				14th	115	
2021	GMS Racing	21	Chevy	DIL	HCY	ROU	ACE	CRW	LGY	DOM	HCY	MMS; 13	TCM	FLC	WKS	SBO	46th	20	

=== CARS Super Late Model Tour ===
(key)

CARS Super Late Model Tour results
Year	Team	No.	Make	1	2	3	4	5	6	7	8	9	10	11	12	13	CSLMTC	Pts	Ref
2016	David Gilliland Racing	97	Toyota	SNM	ROU	HCY	TCM	GRE	ROU	CON	MYB; 14	HCY	SNM; 6				35th	46	
2017	David Gilliland Racing	97C	Toyota	CON	DOM; 2	DOM; 2	HCY	HCY									13th	113	
2017	David Gilliland Racing	97	Toyota						BRI; 9	AND	ROU	TCM	ROU; 7	HCY	CON	SBO	13th	113	

^{*} Season still in progress
^{1} Ineligible for series points
