= SQR Development =

American stock car racing team

- Owner(s): J. C. Stout
- Series: NASCAR Xfinity Series
- Race drivers: NASCAR Xfinity Series: 87. TBA
- Manufacturer: Toyota
- Opened: 2021

Career
- Races competed: 0
- Drivers' Championships: 0
- Race victories: 0
- Pole positions: 0

SQR Development is an American stock car racing team that was scheduled to compete part-time in the NASCAR Xfinity Series in 2022, fielding the No. 87 Toyota Supra. The team is currently owned by J. C. Stout, current New York governor candidate who founded the team in 2021 after previous experience with his another team he owned, Stellar Quest Racing.

== NASCAR Xfinity Series ==
=== Car No. 87 history ===
On December 20, 2021, former driver J. C. Stout would announce that he had formed a new team with chassis bought from Joe Gibbs Racing, with the team planning to run 10-12 races that year.

On January 20, 2022, the team announced that they would sign former Kyle Busch Motorsports and GMS Racing driver Raphaël Lessard for select races for the season. However, on March 29, 2022, Lessard revealed that the team would not compete in 2022 due to an "unfortunate personal matter".
