= 2021 Fr8Auctions 200 =

Race details
- Race 4 of 22 of the 2021 NASCAR Camping World Truck Series
- Date: March 20, 2021
- Official name: Fr8Auctions 200
- Location: Hampton, Georgia, Atlanta Motor Speedway
- Course: Permanent racing facility
- Course length: 1.54 miles (2.478 km)
- Distance: 130 laps, 200.2 mi (322.191 km)
- Average speed: 133.888 miles per hour (215.472 km/h)

Pole position
Driver	John Hunter Nemechek	Kyle Busch Motorsports
- Grid positions set by competition-based formula

Most laps led
Driver	Kyle Busch	Kyle Busch Motorsports
- Laps: 102

Winner
No. 51	Kyle Busch	Kyle Busch Motorsports

Television in the United States
- Network: Fox Sports 1
- Announcers: Vince Welch, Michael Waltrip, Ryan Blaney

Radio in the United States
- Radio: Motor Racing Network

The 2021 Fr8Auctions 200 was the 4th stock car race of the 2021 NASCAR Camping World Truck Series season, and the 16th iteration of the event. The race was held on Saturday, March 20, 2021, in Hampton, Georgia at Atlanta Motor Speedway, a 1.54 miles (2.48 km) permanent quad-oval in a doubleheader with the NASCAR Xfinity Series with the 2021 EchoPark 250. The race would take 130 laps to complete. Kyle Busch, driving for his own team Kyle Busch Motorsports, would win the race in dominating fashion to win his 60th ever NASCAR Camping World Truck Series race. Austin Hill of Hattori Racing Enterprises and John Hunter Nemechek of Kyle Busch Motorsports would garner the rest of the podium positions, finishing 2nd and 3rd, respectively.

Entrepreneur and CEO of Camping World Marcus Lemonis would once again announce his challenge for the race, this time with Overton's sponsoring any unsponsored car. 11 cars would take the sponsorship.

Driver Bill Lester, now 60 years old, last racing in the 2006 NASCAR Craftsman Truck Series, would return after 15 years of absence, running the race as a one-off event.

== Background ==
The layout of Atlanta Motor Speedway, the venue where the race was held.

Atlanta Motor Speedway (formerly Atlanta International Raceway) is a track in Hampton, Georgia, 20 miles (32 km) south of Atlanta. It is a 1.54-mile (2.48 km) quad-oval track with a seating capacity of 111,000. It opened in 1960 as a 1.5-mile (2.4 km) standard oval. In 1994, 46 condominiums were built over the northeastern side of the track. In 1997, to standardize the track with Speedway Motorsports' other two 1.5-mile (2.4 km) ovals, the entire track was almost completely rebuilt. The frontstretch and backstretch were swapped, and the configuration of the track was changed from oval to quad-oval. The project made the track one of the fastest on the NASCAR circuit.

=== Entry list ===
#	Driver	Team	Make
1	Hailie Deegan	David Gilliland Racing	Ford
2	Sheldon Creed	GMS Racing	Chevrolet
02	Kris Wright*	Young's Motorsports	Chevrolet
3	Jordan Anderson	Jordan Anderson Racing	Chevrolet
4	John Hunter Nemechek	Kyle Busch Motorsports	Toyota
04	Cory Roper	Roper Racing	Ford
6	Norm Benning	Norm Benning Racing	Chevrolet
9	Codie Rohrbaugh	CR7 Motorsports	Chevrolet
10	Jennifer Jo Cobb	Jennifer Jo Cobb Racing	Chevrolet
11	Spencer Davis	Spencer Davis Motorsports	Toyota
12	Tate Fogleman	Young's Motorsports	Chevrolet
13	Johnny Sauter	ThorSport Racing	Toyota
14	Trey Hutchens	Trey Hutchens Racing	Chevrolet
15	Tanner Gray	David Gilliland Racing	Ford
16	Austin Hill	Hattori Racing Enterprises	Toyota
17	Bill Lester	David Gilliland Racing	Ford
18	Chandler Smith	Kyle Busch Motorsports	Toyota
19	Derek Kraus	McAnally–Hilgemann Racing	Toyota
20	Spencer Boyd	Young's Motorsports	Chevrolet
21	Zane Smith	GMS Racing	Chevrolet
22	Austin Wayne Self	AM Racing	Chevrolet
23	Chase Purdy	GMS Racing	Chevrolet
24	Raphaël Lessard	GMS Racing	Chevrolet
25	Timothy Peters	Rackley W.A.R.	Chevrolet
26	Tyler Ankrum	GMS Racing	Chevrolet
30	Danny Bohn	On Point Motorsports	Toyota
32	Bret Holmes	Bret Holmes Racing	Chevrolet
33	Akinori Ogata	Reaume Brothers Racing	Chevrolet
34	Ryan Ellis	Reaume Brothers Racing	Toyota
38	Todd Gilliland	Front Row Motorsports	Ford
40	Ryan Truex	Niece Motorsports	Chevrolet
41	Dawson Cram	Cram Racing Enterprises	Chevrolet
42	Carson Hocevar	Niece Motorsports	Chevrolet
44	Ross Chastain	Niece Motorsports	Chevrolet
45	Brett Moffitt	Niece Motorsports	Chevrolet
49	Ray Ciccarelli	CMI Motorsports	Chevrolet
51	Kyle Busch	Kyle Busch Motorsports	Toyota
52	Stewart Friesen	Halmar Friesen Racing	Toyota
75	Parker Kligerman	Henderson Motorsports	Chevrolet
88	Matt Crafton	ThorSport Racing	Toyota
98	Grant Enfinger	ThorSport Racing	Toyota
99	Ben Rhodes	ThorSport Racing	Toyota
Official entry list

*Driver would change to Josh Berry, due to the fact that Kris Wright had tested positive for COVID-19 during the week.

== Starting lineup ==
The starting lineup was based on a formula based on the previous race, the 2021 Bucked Up 200. As a result, John Hunter Nemechek of Kyle Busch Motorsports would win the pole.

Pos.	#	Driver	Team	Make
1	4	John Hunter Nemechek	Kyle Busch Motorsports	Toyota
2	51	Kyle Busch	Kyle Busch Motorsports	Toyota
3	88	Matt Crafton	ThorSport Racing	Toyota
4	52	Stewart Friesen	Halmar Friesen Racing	Toyota
5	99	Ben Rhodes	ThorSport Racing	Toyota
6	16	Austin Hill	Hattori Racing Enterprises	Toyota
7	21	Zane Smith	GMS Racing	Chevrolet
8	2	Sheldon Creed	GMS Racing	Chevrolet
9	38	Todd Gilliland	Front Row Motorsports	Ford
10	45	Brett Moffitt	Niece Motorsports	Chevrolet
11	18	Chandler Smith	Kyle Busch Motorsports	Toyota
12	22	Austin Wayne Self	AM Racing	Chevrolet
13	13	Johnny Sauter	ThorSport Racing	Toyota
14	15	Tanner Gray	David Gilliland Racing	Ford
15	75	Parker Kligerman	Henderson Motorsports	Chevrolet
16	25	Timothy Peters	Rackley W.A.R.	Chevrolet
17	42	Carson Hocevar	Niece Motorsports	Chevrolet
18	02	Josh Berry	Young's Motorsports	Chevrolet
19	98	Grant Enfinger	ThorSport Racing	Toyota
20	9	Codie Rohrbaugh	CR7 Motorsports	Chevrolet
21	30	Danny Bohn	On Point Motorsports	Toyota
22	12	Tate Fogleman	Young's Motorsports	Chevrolet
23	24	Raphaël Lessard	GMS Racing	Chevrolet
24	3	Jordan Anderson	Jordan Anderson Racing	Chevrolet
25	20	Spencer Boyd	Young's Motorsports	Chevrolet
26	23	Chase Purdy	GMS Racing	Chevrolet
27	41	Dawson Cram	Cram Racing Enterprises	Chevrolet
28	1	Hailie Deegan	David Gilliland Racing	Ford
29	19	Derek Kraus	McAnally–Hilgemann Racing	Toyota
30	26	Tyler Ankrum	GMS Racing	Chevrolet
31	17	Bill Lester	David Gilliland Racing	Ford
32	40	Ryan Truex	Niece Motorsports	Chevrolet
33	10	Jennifer Jo Cobb	Jennifer Jo Cobb Racing	Chevrolet
34	04	Cory Roper	Roper Racing	Ford
35	32	Bret Holmes	Bret Holmes Racing	Chevrolet
36	34	Ryan Ellis	Reaume Brothers Racing	Toyota
37	6	Norm Benning	Norm Benning Racing	Chevrolet
38	33	Akinori Ogata	Reaume Brothers Racing	Chevrolet
39	11	Spencer Davis	Spencer Davis Motorsports	Toyota
40	44	Ross Chastain	Niece Motorsports	Chevrolet
Failed to qualify
41	14	Trey Hutchens	Trey Hutchens Racing	Chevrolet
42	49	Ray Ciccarelli	CMI Motorsports	Chevrolet
Official starting lineup

== Race results ==
Stage 1 Laps: 40

Pos.	#	Driver	Team	Make	Pts
1	4	John Hunter Nemechek	Kyle Busch Motorsports	Toyota	10
2	51	Kyle Busch	Kyle Busch Motorsports	Toyota	0
3	16	Austin Hill	Hattori Racing Enterprises	Toyota	8
4	52	Stewart Friesen	Halmar Friesen Racing	Toyota	7
5	44	Ross Chastain	Niece Motorsports	Chevrolet	0
6	19	Derek Kraus	McAnally–Hilgemann Racing	Toyota	5
7	88	Matt Crafton	ThorSport Racing	Toyota	4
8	21	Zane Smith	GMS Racing	Chevrolet	3
9	2	Sheldon Creed	GMS Racing	Chevrolet	2
10	13	Johnny Sauter	ThorSport Racing	Toyota	1

Stage 2 Laps: 40

Pos.	#	Driver	Team	Make	Pts
1	4	John Hunter Nemechek	Kyle Busch Motorsports	Toyota	10
2	51	Kyle Busch	Kyle Busch Motorsports	Toyota	0
3	52	Stewart Friesen	Halmar Friesen Racing	Toyota	8
4	16	Austin Hill	Hattori Racing Enterprises	Toyota	7
5	44	Ross Chastain	Niece Motorsports	Chevrolet	0
6	2	Sheldon Creed	GMS Racing	Chevrolet	5
7	21	Zane Smith	GMS Racing	Chevrolet	4
8	45	Brett Moffitt	Niece Motorsports	Chevrolet	3
9	88	Matt Crafton	ThorSport Racing	Toyota	2
10	19	Derek Kraus	McAnally–Hilgemann Racing	Toyota	1

Stage 3 Laps: 50

Fin	St	#	Driver	Team	Make	Laps	Led	Status	Pts
1	2	51	Kyle Busch	Kyle Busch Motorsports	Toyota	130	102	running	0
2	6	16	Austin Hill	Hattori Racing Enterprises	Toyota	130	0	running	50
3	1	4	John Hunter Nemechek	Kyle Busch Motorsports	Toyota	130	21	running	54
4	13	13	Johnny Sauter	ThorSport Racing	Toyota	130	0	running	34
5	8	2	Sheldon Creed	GMS Racing	Chevrolet	130	0	running	39
6	7	21	Zane Smith	GMS Racing	Chevrolet	130	0	running	38
7	40	44	Ross Chastain	Niece Motorsports	Chevrolet	130	0	running	0
8	3	88	Matt Crafton	ThorSport Racing	Toyota	130	3	running	35
9	10	45	Brett Moffitt	Niece Motorsports	Chevrolet	130	0	running	31
10	4	52	Stewart Friesen	Halmar Friesen Racing	Toyota	130	0	running	42
11	19	98	Grant Enfinger	ThorSport Racing	Toyota	130	0	running	26
12	17	42	Carson Hocevar	Niece Motorsports	Chevrolet	130	0	running	25
13	29	19	Derek Kraus	McAnally–Hilgemann Racing	Toyota	129	0	running	30
14	15	75	Parker Kligerman	Henderson Motorsports	Chevrolet	129	0	running	23
15	32	40	Ryan Truex	Niece Motorsports	Chevrolet	129	0	running	22
16	5	99	Ben Rhodes	ThorSport Racing	Toyota	129	0	running	21
17	9	38	Todd Gilliland	Front Row Motorsports	Ford	129	0	running	20
18	30	26	Tyler Ankrum	GMS Racing	Chevrolet	129	0	running	19
19	14	15	Tanner Gray	David Gilliland Racing	Ford	129	0	running	18
20	39	11	Spencer Davis	Spencer Davis Motorsports	Toyota	129	0	running	17
21	28	1	Hailie Deegan	David Gilliland Racing	Ford	129	0	running	16
22	18	02	Josh Berry	Young's Motorsports	Chevrolet	129	0	running	0
23	12	22	Austin Wayne Self	AM Racing	Chevrolet	128	0	running	14
24	26	23	Chase Purdy	GMS Racing	Chevrolet	128	4	running	13
25	24	3	Jordan Anderson	Jordan Anderson Racing	Chevrolet	128	0	running	0
26	22	12	Tate Fogleman	Young's Motorsports	Chevrolet	128	0	running	11
27	34	04	Cory Roper	Roper Racing	Ford	127	0	running	10
28	21	30	Danny Bohn	On Point Motorsports	Toyota	127	0	running	9
29	20	9	Codie Rohrbaugh	CR7 Motorsports	Chevrolet	126	0	running	8
30	16	25	Timothy Peters	Rackley W.A.R.	Chevrolet	126	0	running	7
31	27	41	Dawson Cram	Cram Racing Enterprises	Chevrolet	126	0	running	6
32	35	32	Bret Holmes	Bret Holmes Racing	Chevrolet	126	0	running	5
33	25	20	Spencer Boyd	Young's Motorsports	Chevrolet	125	0	running	4
34	36	34	Ryan Ellis	Reaume Brothers Racing	Toyota	124	0	running	0
35	11	18	Chandler Smith	Kyle Busch Motorsports	Toyota	124	0	running	2
36	31	17	Bill Lester	David Gilliland Racing	Ford	123	0	running	0
37	38	33	Akinori Ogata	Reaume Brothers Racing	Chevrolet	123	0	running	1
38	33	10	Jennifer Jo Cobb	Jennifer Jo Cobb Racing	Chevrolet	117	0	running	1
39	23	24	Raphaël Lessard	GMS Racing	Chevrolet	115	0	transmission	1
40	37	6	Norm Benning	Norm Benning Racing	Chevrolet	72	0	too slow	1
Official race results

Previous race: 2021 Bucked Up 200	NASCAR Camping World Truck Series; 2021 season	Next race: 2021 Pinty's Truck Race on Dirt
