= 2019 JEGS 200 =

Race details
- Race 6 of 23 in the 2019 NASCAR Gander Outdoors Truck Series season
- Date: May 3, 2019
- Location: Dover International Speedway in Dover, Delaware
- Course: Permanent racing facility
- Course length: 1 miles (1.609 km)
- Distance: 200 laps, 200 mi (321.869 km)

Pole position
Driver	Brett Moffitt	GMS Racing
- Time: 22.303

Most laps led
Driver	Brett Moffitt	GMS Racing
- Laps: 78

Winner
No. 13	Johnny Sauter	ThorSport Racing

Television in the United States
- Network: FS1

Radio in the United States
- Radio: MRN

The 2019 JEGS 200 was a NASCAR Gander Outdoors Truck Series race held on May 3, 2019, at Dover International Speedway in Dover, Delaware. Contested over 200 laps on the 1-mile (1.6-kilometre) concrete speedway, it was the 6th race of the 2019 NASCAR Gander Outdoors Truck Series season.

Johnny Sauter of ThorSport Racing won for the third consecutive year at Dover, passing his teammate Ben Rhodes with approximately thirty laps remaining, leading home polesitter Brett Moffitt and Harrison Burton.

== Entry list ==
No.	Driver	Team	Manufacturer
02	Tyler Dippel (R)	Young's Motorsports	Chevrolet
2	Sheldon Creed (R)	GMS Racing	Chevrolet
3	Jordan Anderson	Jordan Anderson Racing	Chevrolet
4	Todd Gilliland	Kyle Busch Motorsports	Toyota
6	Norm Benning	Norm Benning Racing	Chevrolet
7	Korbin Forrister	All Out Motorsports	Toyota
8	Joe Nemechek	NEMCO Motorsports	Chevrolet
10	Jennifer Jo Cobb	Jennifer Jo Cobb Racing	Chevrolet
12	Gus Dean (R)	Young's Motorsports	Chevrolet
13	Johnny Sauter	ThorSport Racing	Ford
16	Austin Hill	Hattori Racing Enterprises	Toyota
17	Tyler Ankrum (R)	DGR-Crosley	Toyota
18	Harrison Burton (R)	Kyle Busch Motorsports	Toyota
19	Derek Kraus	Bill McAnally Racing	Toyota
20	Spencer Boyd (R)	Young's Motorsports	Chevrolet
22	Austin Wayne Self	AM Racing	Chevrolet
24	Brett Moffitt	GMS Racing	Chevrolet
30	Brennan Poole (R)	On Point Motorsports	Toyota
33	Ryan Sieg (i)	Reaume Brothers Racing	Chevrolet
34	Josh Reaume	Reaume Brothers Racing	Chevrolet
44	Reid Wilson	Niece Motorsports	Chevrolet
45	Ross Chastain (i)	Niece Motorsports	Chevrolet
46	Raphaël Lessard	Kyle Busch Motorsports	Toyota
49	Ray Ciccarelli	CMI Motorsports	Chevrolet
51	Brandon Jones (i)	Kyle Busch Motorsports	Toyota
52	Stewart Friesen	Halmar Friesen Racing	Chevrolet
54	Natalie Decker (R)	DGR-Crosley	Toyota
56	Tyler Hill	Hill Motorsports	Chevrolet
88	Matt Crafton	ThorSport Racing	Ford
97	Jesse Little	JJL Motorsports	Ford
98	Grant Enfinger	ThorSport Racing	Ford
99	Ben Rhodes	ThorSport Racing	Ford

== Practice ==
=== First practice ===
Raphaël Lessard was the fastest in the first practice session with a time of 23.226 seconds and a speed of 154.999 mph (249.447 km/h).

Pos	No.	Driver	Team	Manufacturer	Time	Speed
1	46	Raphaël Lessard	Kyle Busch Motorsports	Toyota	23.226	154.999
2	24	Brett Moffitt	GMS Racing	Chevrolet	23.295	154.540
3	16	Austin Hill	Hattori Racing Enterprises	Toyota	23.343	154.222

=== Final practice ===
Johnny Sauter was the fastest in the final practice session with a time of 22.936 seconds and a speed of 156.958 mph (252.599 km/h).

Pos	No.	Driver	Team	Manufacturer	Time	Speed
1	13	Johnny Sauter	ThorSport Racing	Ford	22.936	156.958
2	24	Brett Moffitt	GMS Racing	Chevrolet	23.002	156.508
3	52	Stewart Friesen	Halmar Friesen Racing	Chevrolet	23.044	156.223

== Qualifying ==
Brett Moffitt scored the pole for the race with a time of 22.303 seconds and a speed of 161.413 mph (259.769 km/h).

=== Qualifying results ===
Pos	No	Driver	Team	Manufacturer	Time
1	24	Brett Moffitt	GMS Racing	Chevrolet	22.303
2	13	Johnny Sauter	ThorSport Racing	Ford	22.511
3	2	Sheldon Creed (R)	GMS Racing	Chevrolet	22.519
4	52	Stewart Friesen	Halmar Friesen Racing	Chevrolet	22.548
5	88	Matt Crafton	ThorSport Racing	Ford	22.561
6	98	Grant Enfinger	ThorSport Racing	Ford	22.575
7	46	Raphaël Lessard	Kyle Busch Motorsports	Toyota	22.619
8	30	Brennan Poole (R)	On Point Motorsports	Toyota	22.663
9	18	Harrison Burton (R)	Kyle Busch Motorsports	Toyota	22.666
10	17	Tyler Ankrum (R)	DGR-Crosley	Toyota	22.669
11	99	Ben Rhodes	ThorSport Racing	Ford	22.753
12	16	Austin Hill	Hattori Racing Enterprises	Toyota	22.753
13	97	Jesse Little	JJL Motorsports	Ford	22.818
14	4	Todd Gilliland	Kyle Busch Motorsports	Toyota	22.825
15	19	Derek Kraus	Bill McAnally Racing	Toyota	22.845
16	45	Ross Chastain (i)	Niece Motorsports	Chevrolet	22.979
17	22	Austin Wayne Self	AM Racing	Chevrolet	22.990
18	12	Gus Dean (R)	Young's Motorsports	Chevrolet	23.063
19	51	Brandon Jones (i)	Kyle Busch Motorsports	Toyota	23.088
20	54	Natalie Decker (R)	DGR-Crosley	Toyota	23.117
21	8	Joe Nemechek	NEMCO Motorsports	Chevrolet	23.143
22	3	Jordan Anderson	Jordan Anderson Racing	Chevrolet	23.365
23	02	Tyler Dippel (R)	Young's Motorsports	Chevrolet	23.383
24	44	Reid Wilson	Niece Motorsports	Chevrolet	23.406
25	56	Tyler Hill	Hill Motorsports	Chevrolet	23.428
26	7	Korbin Forrister	All Out Motorsports	Toyota	23.500
27	20	Spencer Boyd (R)	Young's Motorsports	Chevrolet	24.822
28	10	Jennifer Jo Cobb	Jennifer Jo Cobb Racing	Chevrolet	25.627
29	34	Josh Reaume	Reaume Brothers Racing	Chevrolet	25.757
30	49	Ray Ciccarelli	CMI Motorsports	Chevrolet	26.432
31	6	Norm Benning	Norm Benning Racing	Chevrolet	26.540
32	33	Ryan Sieg (i)	Reaume Brothers Racing	Chevrolet	0.000

== Race ==
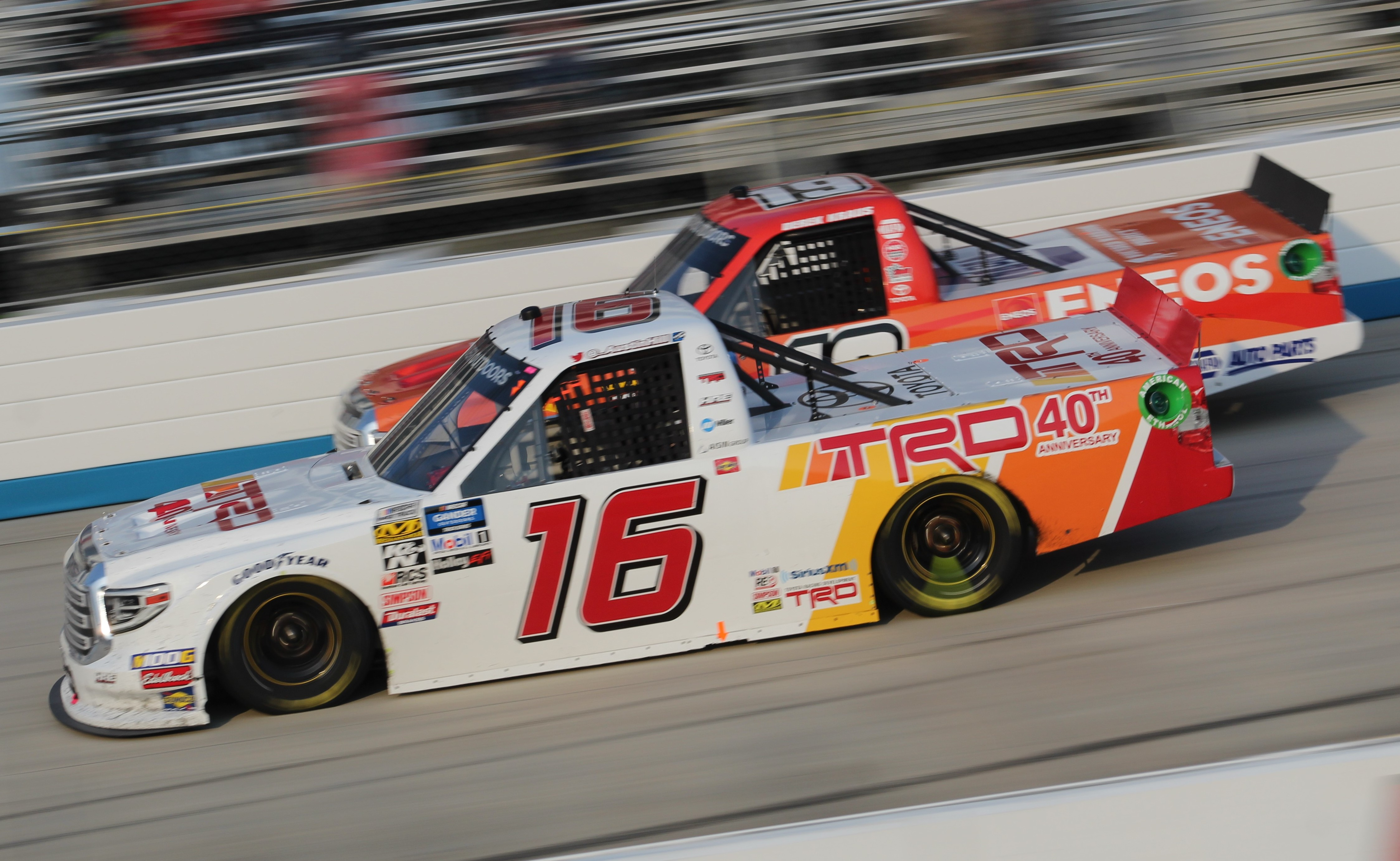
Austin Hill (16) and Derek Kraus (19) at the race.

Brett Moffitt started on pole and led the first stage of the race, though Johnny Sauter trailed him closely. Sheldon Creed was able to catch up to Sauter and move up into contention thanks to lapped traffic. When Creed caught up to Moffitt, they approached Spencer Boyd and Ray Ciccarelli running side-by-side. The lapped trucks held up both Moffitt and Creed, allowing Sauter to take and hold on to the lead, winning the second stage. Creed got off pit road quickly and managed to lead 59 of the next 61 laps. A caution occurred due to Austin Wayne Self crashing on the front stretch, causing all of the drivers to make their final pit stops for the race. Creed fell behind while Ben Rhodes assumed the lead. Afterwards, Creed spun exiting Turn 2 and hit Todd Gilliland, heavily damaging the front of his truck, ultimately eliminating him from the race after his strong run. Sauter was able to pass Rhodes for the lead with 30 laps to go, and held off a charging Moffitt to claim his 24th career Gander Outdoors Truck Series victory and his 3rd straight win at Dover.

=== Stage results ===
Stage One Laps: 45

Pos	No	Driver	Team	Manufacturer	Points
1	24	Brett Moffitt	GMS Racing	Chevrolet	10
2	13	Johnny Sauter	ThorSport Racing	Ford	9
3	2	Sheldon Creed (R)	GMS Racing	Chevrolet	8
4	98	Grant Enfinger	ThorSport Racing	Ford	7
5	18	Harrison Burton (R)	Kyle Busch Motorsports	Toyota	6
6	52	Stewart Friesen	Halmar Friesen Racing	Chevrolet	5
7	16	Austin Hill	Hattori Racing Enterprises	Toyota	4
8	17	Tyler Ankrum (R)	DGR-Crosley	Toyota	3
9	46	Raphaël Lessard	Kyle Busch Motorsports	Toyota	2
10	88	Matt Crafton	ThorSport Racing	Ford	1

Stage Two Laps: 45

Pos	No	Driver	Team	Manufacturer	Points
1	13	Johnny Sauter	ThorSport Racing	Ford	10
2	2	Sheldon Creed (R)	GMS Racing	Chevrolet	9
3	24	Brett Moffitt	GMS Racing	Chevrolet	8
4	98	Grant Enfinger	ThorSport Racing	Ford	7
5	16	Austin Hill	Hattori Racing Enterprises	Toyota	6
6	18	Harrison Burton (R)	Kyle Busch Motorsports	Toyota	5
7	97	Jesse Little	JJL Motorsports	Ford	4
8	99	Ben Rhodes	ThorSport Racing	Ford	3
9	51	Brandon Jones (i)	Kyle Busch Motorsports	Toyota	0
10	45	Ross Chastain (i)	Niece Motorsports	Chevrolet	0

=== Final stage results ===
Stage Three Laps: 110

Pos	Grid	No	Driver	Team	Manufacturer	Laps	Points
1	2	13	Johnny Sauter	ThorSport Racing	Ford	200	59
2	1	24	Brett Moffitt	GMS Racing	Chevrolet	200	53
3	9	18	Harrison Burton (R)	Kyle Busch Motorsports	Toyota	200	45
4	6	98	Grant Enfinger	ThorSport Racing	Ford	200	47
5	5	88	Matt Crafton	ThorSport Racing	Ford	200	33
6	11	99	Ben Rhodes	ThorSport Racing	Ford	200	34
7	12	16	Austin Hill	Hattori Racing Enterprises	Toyota	200	40
8	15	19	Derek Kraus	Bill McAnally Racing	Toyota	200	29
9	10	17	Tyler Ankrum (R)	DGR-Crosley	Toyota	200	31
10	16	45	Ross Chastain (i)	Niece Motorsports	Chevrolet	200	0
11	7	46	Raphaël Lessard	Kyle Busch Motorsports	Toyota	200	28
12	4	52	Stewart Friesen	Halmar Friesen Racing	Chevrolet	200	30
13	19	51	Brandon Jones (i)	Kyle Busch Motorsports	Toyota	200	0
14	18	12	Gus Dean (R)	Young's Motorsports	Chevrolet	200	23
15	14	4	Todd Gilliland	Kyle Busch Motorsports	Toyota	200	22
16	32	33	Ryan Sieg (i)	Reaume Brothers Racing	Chevrolet	198	0
17	20	54	Natalie Decker (R)	DGR-Crosley	Toyota	197	20
18	23	02	Tyler Dippel (R)	Young's Motorsports	Chevrolet	197	19
19	17	22	Austin Wayne Self	AM Racing	Chevrolet	197	18
20	25	56	Tyler Hill	Hill Motorsports	Chevrolet	197	17
21	22	3	Jordan Anderson	Jordan Anderson Racing	Chevrolet	196	16
22	27	20	Spencer Boyd (R)	Young's Motorsports	Chevrolet	192	15
23	8	30	Brennan Poole (R)	On Point Motorsports	Toyota	189	14
24	30	49	Ray Ciccarelli	CMI Motorsports	Chevrolet	188	13
25	28	10	Jennifer Jo Cobb	Jennifer Jo Cobb Racing	Chevrolet	186	12
26	21	8	Joe Nemechek	NEMCO Motorsports	Chevrolet	167	11
27	3	2	Sheldon Creed (R)	GMS Racing	Chevrolet	160	27
28	24	44	Reid Wilson	Niece Motorsports	Chevrolet	140	9
29	13	97	Jesse Little	JJL Motorsports	Ford	115	12
30	26	7	Korbin Forrister	All Out Motorsports	Toyota	108	7
31	29	34	Josh Reaume	Reaume Brothers Racing	Chevrolet	51	6
32	31	6	Norm Benning	Norm Benning Racing	Chevrolet	28	5

Previous race: 2019 Vankor 350	NASCAR Gander Outdoors Truck Series; 2019 season	Next race: 2019 Digital Ally 250
