= 2021 WISE Power 200 =

Race details
- Race 7 of 22 of the 2021 NASCAR Camping World Truck Series
- Date: May 1, 2021
- Official name: WISE Power 200
- Location: Kansas City, Kansas, Kansas Speedway
- Course: Permanent racing facility
- Course length: 1.5 miles (2.414 km)
- Distance: 140 laps, 210 mi (337.96 km)
- Scheduled distance: 134 laps, 201 mi (323.477 km)
- Average speed: 119.582 miles per hour (192.449 km/h)

Pole position
Driver	John Hunter Nemechek	Kyle Busch Motorsports
- Grid positions set by competition-based formula

Most laps led
Driver	Kyle Busch	Kyle Busch Motorsports
- Laps: 59

Winner
No. 51	Kyle Busch	Kyle Busch Motorsports

Television in the United States
- Network: Fox Sports 1
- Announcers: Vince Welch, Michael Waltrip, and Phil Parsons

Radio in the United States
- Radio: Motor Racing Network

The 2021 WISE Power 200 was the 7th stock car race of the 2021 NASCAR Camping World Truck Series season and the 21st iteration of the event. The race was held on Saturday, May 1, 2021, in Kansas City, Kansas at Kansas Speedway. The race was extended from 134 laps to 140 due to a NASCAR overtime finish. Kyle Busch, driving for his own team Kyle Busch Motorsports would score his 61st win in the series. Ross Chastain of Niece Motorsports and Austin Hill of Hattori Racing Enterprises would fill in the rest of the podium positions, scoring 2nd and 3rd, respectively.

== Background ==
The layout of Kansas Speedway, the venue where the race was held.

Kansas Speedway is a 1.5-mile (2.4 km) tri-oval race track in Kansas City, Kansas. It was built in 2001 and hosts two annual NASCAR race weekends. The IndyCar Series also raced there until 2011. The speedway is owned and operated by the International Speedway Corporation.

=== Entry list ===
#	Driver	Team	Make
1	Hailie Deegan	David Gilliland Racing	Ford
2	Sheldon Creed	GMS Racing	Chevrolet
02	Kris Wright	Young's Motorsports	Chevrolet
3	Jordan Anderson	Jordan Anderson Racing	Chevrolet
4	John Hunter Nemechek	Kyle Busch Motorsports	Toyota
04	Chase Briscoe	Roper Racing	Ford
6	Norm Benning	Norm Benning Racing	Chevrolet
9	Grant Enfinger	CR7 Motorsports	Chevrolet
10	Jennifer Jo Cobb	Jennifer Jo Cobb	Chevrolet
11	Spencer Davis	Spencer Davis Motorsports	Toyota
12	Tate Fogleman	Young's Motorsports	Chevrolet
13	Johnny Sauter	ThorSport Racing	Toyota
14	Trey Hutchens	Trey Hutchens Racing	Chevrolet
15	Tanner Gray	David Gilliland Racing	Ford
16	Austin Hill	Hattori Racing Enterprises	Toyota
18	Chandler Smith	Kyle Busch Motorsports	Toyota
19	Derek Kraus	McAnally–Hilgemann Racing	Toyota
20	Spencer Boyd	Young's Motorsports	Chevrolet
21	Zane Smith	GMS Racing	Chevrolet
22	Austin Wayne Self	AM Racing	Chevrolet
23	Chase Purdy	GMS Racing	Chevrolet
24	Raphaël Lessard	GMS Racing	Chevrolet
25	Timothy Peters	Rackley W.A.R.	Chevrolet
26	Tyler Ankrum	GMS Racing	Chevrolet
30	Danny Bohn	On Point Motorsports	Toyota
32	Bret Holmes	Bret Holmes Racing	Chevrolet
33	Jesse Iwuji	Reaume Brothers Racing	Chevrolet
34	C. J. McLaughlin	Reaume Brothers Racing	Toyota
38	Todd Gilliland	Front Row Motorsports	Ford
40	Ryan Truex	Niece Motorsports	Chevrolet
41	Dawson Cram	Cram Racing Enterprises	Chevrolet
42	Carson Hocevar	Niece Motorsports	Chevrolet
44	Ross Chastain	Niece Motorsports	Chevrolet
45	Bayley Currey	Niece Motorsports	Chevrolet
49	Ryan Reed	CMI Motorsports	Chevrolet
51	Kyle Busch	Kyle Busch Motorsports	Toyota
52	Stewart Friesen	Halmar Friesen Racing	Toyota
56	Timmy Hill	Hill Motorsports	Chevrolet
88	Matt Crafton	ThorSport Racing	Toyota
98	Christian Eckes	ThorSport Racing	Toyota
99	Ben Rhodes	ThorSport Racing	Toyota
Official entry list

== Qualifying ==
Qualifying was determined by a metric qualifying system based on the last race, the 2021 ToyotaCare 250 and owner's points. As a result, John Hunter Nemechek of Kyle Busch Motorsports won the pole.

Pos.	#	Driver	Team	Make
1	4	John Hunter Nemechek	Kyle Busch Motorsports	Toyota
2	51	Kyle Busch	Kyle Busch Motorsports	Toyota
3	99	Ben Rhodes	ThorSport Racing	Toyota
4	13	Johnny Sauter	ThorSport Racing	Toyota
5	18	Chandler Smith	Kyle Busch Motorsports	Toyota
6	38	Todd Gilliland	Front Row Motorsports	Ford
7	16	Austin Hill	Hattori Racing Enterprises	Toyota
8	2	Sheldon Creed	GMS Racing	Chevrolet
9	21	Zane Smith	GMS Racing	Chevrolet
10	52	Stewart Friesen	Halmar Friesen Racing	Toyota
11	42	Carson Hocevar	Niece Motorsports	Chevrolet
12	88	Matt Crafton	ThorSport Racing	Toyota
13	26	Tyler Ankrum	GMS Racing	Chevrolet
14	19	Derek Kraus	McAnally–Hilgemann Racing	Toyota
15	24	Raphaël Lessard	GMS Racing	Chevrolet
16	22	Austin Wayne Self	AM Racing	Chevrolet
17	98	Christian Eckes	ThorSport Racing	Toyota
18	15	Tanner Gray	David Gilliland Racing	Ford
19	11	Spencer Davis	Spencer Davis Motorsports	Toyota
20	1	Hailie Deegan	David Gilliland Racing	Ford
21	30	Danny Bohn	On Point Motorsports	Toyota
22	25	Timothy Peters	Rackley W.A.R.	Chevrolet
23	23	Chase Purdy	GMS Racing	Chevrolet
24	02	Kris Wright	Young's Motorsports	Chevrolet
25	56	Timmy Hill	Hill Motorsports	Chevrolet
26	45	Bayley Currey	Niece Motorsports	Chevrolet
27	20	Spencer Boyd	Young's Motorsports	Chevrolet
28	41	Dawson Cram	Cram Racing Enterprises	Chevrolet
29	9	Grant Enfinger	CR7 Motorsports	Chevrolet
30	04	Chase Briscoe	Roper Racing	Ford
31	40	Ryan Truex	Niece Motorsports	Chevrolet
32	32	Bret Holmes	Bret Holmes Racing	Chevrolet
33	49	Ryan Reed	CMI Motorsports	Chevrolet
34	44	Ross Chastain	Niece Motorsports	Chevrolet
35	12	Tate Fogleman	Young's Motorsports	Chevrolet
36	3	Jordan Anderson	Jordan Anderson Racing	Chevrolet
37	6	Norm Benning	Norm Benning Racing	Chevrolet
38	33	Jesse Iwuji	Reaume Brothers Racing	Chevrolet
39	10	Jennifer Jo Cobb	Jennifer Jo Cobb	Chevrolet
40	34	C. J. McLaughlin	Reaume Brothers Racing	Toyota
Failed to qualify
41	14	Trey Hutchens	Trey Hutchens Racing	Chevrolet
Official starting lineup

== Race results ==
Stage 1 Laps: 30

Fin	#	Driver	Team	Make	Pts
1	51	Kyle Busch	Kyle Busch Motorsports	Toyota	0
2	4	John Hunter Nemechek	Kyle Busch Motorsports	Toyota	9
3	2	Sheldon Creed	GMS Racing	Chevrolet	8
4	99	Ben Rhodes	ThorSport Racing	Toyota	7
5	88	Matt Crafton	ThorSport Racing	Toyota	6
6	16	Austin Hill	Hattori Racing Enterprises	Toyota	5
7	52	Stewart Friesen	Halmar Friesen Racing	Toyota	4
8	38	Todd Gilliland	Front Row Motorsports	Ford	3
9	19	Derek Kraus	McAnally–Hilgemann Racing	Toyota	2
10	44	Ross Chastain	Niece Motorsports	Chevrolet	0

Stage 2 Laps: 30

Fin	#	Driver	Team	Make	Pts
1	51	Kyle Busch	Kyle Busch Motorsports	Toyota	0
2	4	John Hunter Nemechek	Kyle Busch Motorsports	Toyota	9
3	2	Sheldon Creed	GMS Racing	Chevrolet	8
4	16	Austin Hill	Hattori Racing Enterprises	Toyota	7
5	21	Zane Smith	GMS Racing	Chevrolet	6
6	52	Stewart Friesen	Halmar Friesen Racing	Toyota	5
7	19	Derek Kraus	McAnally–Hilgemann Racing	Toyota	4
8	99	Ben Rhodes	ThorSport Racing	Toyota	3
9	38	Todd Gilliland	Front Row Motorsports	Ford	2
10	1	Hailie Deegan	David Gilliland Racing	Ford	1

Stage 3 Laps: 80

Fin	St	#	Driver	Team	Make	Laps	Led	Status	Pts
1	2	51	Kyle Busch	Kyle Busch Motorsports	Toyota	140	59	running	0
2	34	44	Ross Chastain	Niece Motorsports	Chevrolet	140	6	running	0
3	7	16	Austin Hill	Hattori Racing Enterprises	Toyota	140	0	running	46
4	17	98	Christian Eckes	ThorSport Racing	Toyota	140	3	running	33
5	1	4	John Hunter Nemechek	Kyle Busch Motorsports	Toyota	140	16	running	50
6	6	38	Todd Gilliland	Front Row Motorsports	Ford	140	0	running	36
7	9	21	Zane Smith	GMS Racing	Chevrolet	140	0	running	36
8	15	24	Raphaël Lessard	GMS Racing	Chevrolet	140	0	running	29
9	4	13	Johnny Sauter	ThorSport Racing	Toyota	140	13	running	28
10	3	99	Ben Rhodes	ThorSport Racing	Toyota	140	2	running	37
11	5	18	Chandler Smith	Kyle Busch Motorsports	Toyota	140	0	running	26
12	26	45	Bayley Currey	Niece Motorsports	Chevrolet	140	0	running	0
13	20	1	Hailie Deegan	David Gilliland Racing	Ford	140	0	running	25
14	10	52	Stewart Friesen	Halmar Friesen Racing	Toyota	140	0	running	32
15	13	26	Tyler Ankrum	GMS Racing	Chevrolet	140	0	running	22
16	16	22	Austin Wayne Self	AM Racing	Chevrolet	139	0	running	21
17	29	9	Grant Enfinger	CR7 Motorsports	Chevrolet	139	0	running	20
18	18	15	Tanner Gray	David Gilliland Racing	Ford	139	0	running	19
19	30	04	Chase Briscoe	Roper Racing	Ford	139	0	running	0
20	31	40	Ryan Truex	Niece Motorsports	Chevrolet	139	0	running	17
21	22	25	Timothy Peters	Rackley W.A.R.	Chevrolet	139	0	running	16
22	25	56	Timmy Hill	Hill Motorsports	Chevrolet	139	0	running	0
23	11	42	Carson Hocevar	Niece Motorsports	Chevrolet	139	0	running	14
24	12	88	Matt Crafton	ThorSport Racing	Toyota	139	0	running	19
25	23	23	Chase Purdy	GMS Racing	Chevrolet	138	0	running	12
26	21	30	Danny Bohn	On Point Motorsports	Toyota	138	0	running	11
27	32	32	Bret Holmes	Bret Holmes Racing	Chevrolet	138	0	running	10
28	14	19	Derek Kraus	McAnally–Hilgemann Racing	Toyota	138	0	running	15
29	19	11	Spencer Davis	Spencer Davis Motorsports	Toyota	137	0	running	8
30	36	3	Jordan Anderson	Jordan Anderson Racing	Chevrolet	137	0	running	0
31	28	41	Dawson Cram	Cram Racing Enterprises	Chevrolet	137	0	running	6
32	8	2	Sheldon Creed	GMS Racing	Chevrolet	136	41	running	21
33	24	02	Kris Wright	Young's Motorsports	Chevrolet	135	0	running	4
34	40	34	C. J. McLaughlin	Reaume Brothers Racing	Toyota	133	0	running	3
35	27	20	Spencer Boyd	Young's Motorsports	Chevrolet	133	0	running	2
36	35	12	Tate Fogleman	Young's Motorsports	Chevrolet	130	0	running	1
37	39	10	Jennifer Jo Cobb	Jennifer Jo Cobb	Chevrolet	106	0	electrical	1
38	38	33	Jesse Iwuji	Reaume Brothers Racing	Chevrolet	73	0	too slow	1
39	37	6	Norm Benning	Norm Benning Racing	Chevrolet	42	0	too slow	1
40	33	49	Ryan Reed	CMI Motorsports	Chevrolet	27	0	steering	1
Official race results

Previous race: 2021 ToyotaCare 250	NASCAR Camping World Truck Series; 2021 season	Next race: 2021 LiftKits4Less.com 200
