= J. C. Stout =

American racing driver (born 1983)

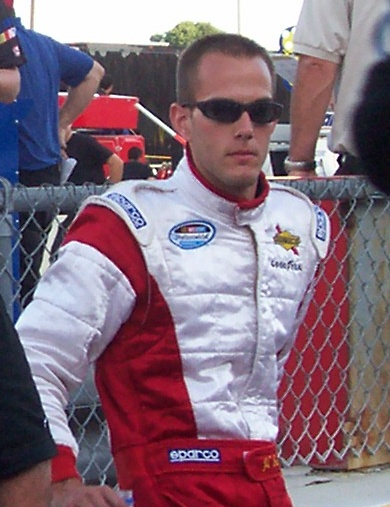
- Stout at the Milwaukee Mile in 2009
- Born: John C. Stout; September 15, 1983 (age 43); Castile, New York, U.S.

NASCAR O'Reilly Auto Parts Series career
- 9 races run over 3 years
- 2010 position: 123rd
- Best finish: 91st (2009)
- First race: 2008 Heluva Good! 200 (Dover)
- Last race: 2010 Kroger 200 (IRP)
Wins	Top tens	Poles
0	0	0

NASCAR FedEx Freight Truck Series career
- 35 races run over 8 years
- 2010 position: 35th
- Best finish: 35th (2010)
- First race: 2003 Advance Auto Parts 250 (Martinsville)
- Last race: 2010 TheRaceDayRaffleSeries.com 175 (New Hampshire)
Wins	Top tens	Poles
0	0	0
- Statistics up to date as of December 20, 2021.

John C. Stout (born September 15, 1983) is an American former professional stock car racing driver and current team owner of SQR Development, which was scheduled to field one part-time Toyota Supra in the NASCAR Xfinity Series in 2022. As a driver, he competed part-time in the Xfinity Series (then known as the Nationwide Series), the NASCAR Camping World Truck Series, and the ARCA Menards Series East (then known as the NASCAR K&N Pro Series East) between 2003 and 2013.

== Racing career ==
Stout began racing karts in western New York at age 11. After winning track championships, he moved up to Super Trucks (which is a class of late model chassis with truck bodies) at age 15 and won track championships. He then began racing late model stock cars at age 18 throughout western New York and Pennsylvania. He then competed part-time in the NASCAR Truck Series from 2003 to 2010, the Nationwide (now Xfinity) Series from 2008 to 2010, and the K&N Pro Series East (now the ARCA Menards Series East) in 2013. On December 20, 2021, Stout announced his return to NASCAR, restarting his Xfinity Series team which last competed in the series in 2009 after buying some Toyotas from Joe Gibbs Racing. The team name was previously Stellar Quest Racing and would be renamed as SQR Development. The team had plans to run ten to twelve races with the first one being at Richmond.

== Political career ==
In a SQR Development written statement published December 20, 2021 on a NASCAR fan website, Stout was stated as being a candidate for Governor of New York in the 2022 election. The details about his campaign, including which political party's nomination he is running for (or if he is running as an independent), are unclear. He was not listed as an official candidate for this office during the 2022 election.

== Personal life ==
On January 2, 2022, Stout was arrested for repeatedly harassing his wife. On April 2, 2022, he was charged with criminal contempt of court for violating an order of protection.

== Motorsports career results ==
=== NASCAR ===
(key) (Bold – Pole position awarded by qualifying time. Italics – Pole position earned by points standings or practice time. * – Most laps led.)

==== Nationwide Series ====
NASCAR Nationwide Series results
Year	Team	No.	Make	1	2	3	4	5	6	7	8	9	10	11	12	13	14	15	16	17	18	19	20	21	22	23	24	25	26	27	28	29	30	31	32	33	34	35	NNSC	Pts	Ref
2008	JD Motorsports	01	Chevy	DAY	CAL	LVS	ATL	BRI	NSH	TEX	PHO	MXC	TAL	RCH	DAR	CLT	DOV; 38	NSH	KEN																				108th	138	
2008	JD Motorsports	0	Chevy																	MLW; 40	NHA; 39	DAY	CHI	GTY	IRP	CGV	GLN	MCH	BRI	CAL	RCH	DOV	KAN	CLT	MEM	TEX	PHO	HOM	108th	138	
2009	JD Motorsports	0	Chevy	DAY	CAL; 38	LVS	BRI	TEX; 40	NSH	PHO	TAL	RCH	DAR					MLW; 37	NHA	DAY									ATL; DNQ	RCH; 40	DOV; DNQ	KAN	CAL	CLT	MEM	TEX	PHO	HOM	91st	239	
2009	Stellar Quest Racing	19	Chevy											CLT; 37	DOV	NSH	KEN; DNQ				CHI; DNQ	GTY	IRP	IOW	GLN	MCH; DNQ	BRI	CGV											91st	239	
2010	Rick Ware Racing	31	Chevy	DAY	CAL	LVS	BRI	NSH	PHO	TEX	TAL	RCH	DAR	DOV	CLT	NSH	KEN	ROA	NHA	DAY	CHI	GTY	IRP; 29	IOW	GLN	MCH	BRI	CGV	ATL	RCH	DOV	KAN	CAL	CLT	GTY	TEX	PHO	HOM	123rd	76	

==== Camping World Truck Series ====
NASCAR Camping World Truck Series results
Year	Team	No.	Make	1	2	3	4	5	6	7	8	9	10	11	12	13	14	15	16	17	18	19	20	21	22	23	24	25	NCWTC	Pts	Ref
2003	Stellar Quest Racing	91	Chevy	DAY	DAR	MMR	MAR; 31	CLT	DOV	TEX	MEM	MLW; 19	KAN	KEN	GTW	MCH	IRP	NSH	BRI	RCH	NHA; 31	CAL	LVS; DNQ	SBO	TEX	MAR	PHO	HOM	75th	246	
2004	Stellar Quest Racing	91	Chevy	DAY	ATL	MAR	MFD; DNQ	CLT	DOV	TEX	MEM; 30	MLW	KAN	KEN	GTW	MCH	IRP	NSH	BRI	RCH; DNQ	NHA	LVS	CAL	TEX	MAR	PHO	DAR	HOM	103rd	73	
2005	Stellar Quest Racing	91	Chevy	DAY	CAL	ATL	MAR	GTY; DNQ	MFD	CLT	DOV	TEX	MCH	MLW; 30	KAN	KEN	MEM	IRP	NSH; 31	BRI	RCH	NHA; DNQ	LVS	MAR	ATL	TEX	PHO	HOM	71st	143	
2006	Stellar Quest Racing	91	Chevy	DAY	CAL	ATL	MAR	GTY; DNQ	CLT	MFD	DOV	TEX	MCH	MLW	KAN	KEN; 29	MEM	IRP	NSH; 32	BRI	NHA; 28	LVS	TAL	MAR; 28	ATL	TEX	PHO	HOM	52nd	301	
2007	Stellar Quest Racing	91	Chevy	DAY	CAL	ATL	MAR	KAN	CLT; 26	MFD	DOV	TEX	MCH; 31	MLW	MEM	KEN; 24	IRP	NSH; 31	BRI	GTW	NHA; 29	LVS	TAL	MAR	ATL	TEX	PHO	HOM	52nd	392	
2008	Stellar Quest Racing	91	Chevy	DAY	CAL	ATL	MAR	KAN	CLT; 30	MFD	DOV; 31					KEN; 35	IRP	NSH	BRI		NHA; 26	LVS	TAL	MAR	ATL				41st	563	
2008	MB Motorsports	36	Ford									TEX; 34								GTW; 33						TEX; 26	PHO	HOM	41st	563	
2008	SS-Green Light Racing	07	Chevy										MCH; 32	MLW	MEM														41st	563	
2009	Premier Racing	77	Toyota	DAY; 34	CAL; 35	ATL	MAR	KAN	CLT	DOV	TEX	MCH	MLW	MEM	KEN	IRP	NSH	BRI	CHI	IOW	GTW	NHA	LVS	MAR	TAL	TEX	PHO	HOM	82nd	119	
2010	Rick Ware Racing	6	Dodge	DAY	ATL	MAR	NSH	KAN	DOV	CLT; 23																			35th	802	
2010	Rick Ware Racing	6	Chevy										IOW; 21	GTY															35th	802	
2010	Rick Ware Racing	16	Chevy									MCH; 36				POC; 35	NSH; 32												35th	802	
2010	Team Gill Racing	95	Dodge								TEX; 31											NHA; 36	LVS; DNQ	MAR	TAL	TEX	PHO	HOM	35th	802	
2010	Team Gill Racing	46	Dodge												IRP; 19			DAR; 13	BRI	CHI; 30	KEN								35th	802	

==== K&N Pro Series East ====
NASCAR K&N Pro Series East results
Year	Team	No.	Make	1	2	3	4	5	6	7	8	9	10	11	12	13	14	NKNPSEC	Pts	Ref
2013	Stellar Quest Racing	91	Chevy	BRI	GRE	PEN	RCH	BGS	IOW	LGY	COL	IOW	VIR	GRE	NHA	DOV; DNQ	RAL	NA	-	
