= 2021 BrakeBest Brake Pads 159 =

2021 BrakeBest Brake Pads 159 presented by O'Reilly
Race details
- Race 2 of 22 of the 2021 NASCAR Camping World Truck Series
- Date: February 19, 2021
- Official name: BrakeBest Brake Pads 159 presented by O'Reilly
- Location: Daytona Beach, Florida, Daytona International Speedway road course
- Course: Permanent racing facility
- Course length: 3.61 miles (5.81 km)
- Distance: 51 laps, 184.11 mi (296.542 km)
- Scheduled distance: 44 laps, 158.840 mi (255.628 km)
- Average speed: 67.044 miles per hour (107.897 km/h)

Pole position
Driver	Ben Rhodes	ThorSport Racing
- Grid positions set by competition-based formula

Most laps led
Driver	Sheldon Creed	GMS Racing
- Laps: 17

Winner
No. 99	Ben Rhodes	ThorSport Racing

Television in the United States
- Network: Fox Sports 1
- Announcers: Vince Welch and Michael Waltrip

Radio in the United States
- Radio: Motor Racing Network

The 2021 BrakeBest Brake Pads 159 presented by O'Reilly was the 2nd stock car race of the 2021 NASCAR Camping World Truck Series season and the 2nd iteration of the event. The race was held on Friday, February 19, 2021, in Daytona Beach, Florida at the Daytona International Speedway road course. The race was extended from 44 to 51 laps due to a green–white–checkered finish. As the race ended under caution, Ben Rhodes of ThorSport Racing would win his 2nd straight win of the season and the fifth of his career. To fill out the podium, Sheldon Creed of GMS Racing and John Hunter Nemechek of Kyle Busch Motorsports would finish 2nd and 3rd, respectively.

The race would mark the NASCAR Camping World Truck Series debuts for Lawless Alan and Jett Noland.

== Background ==
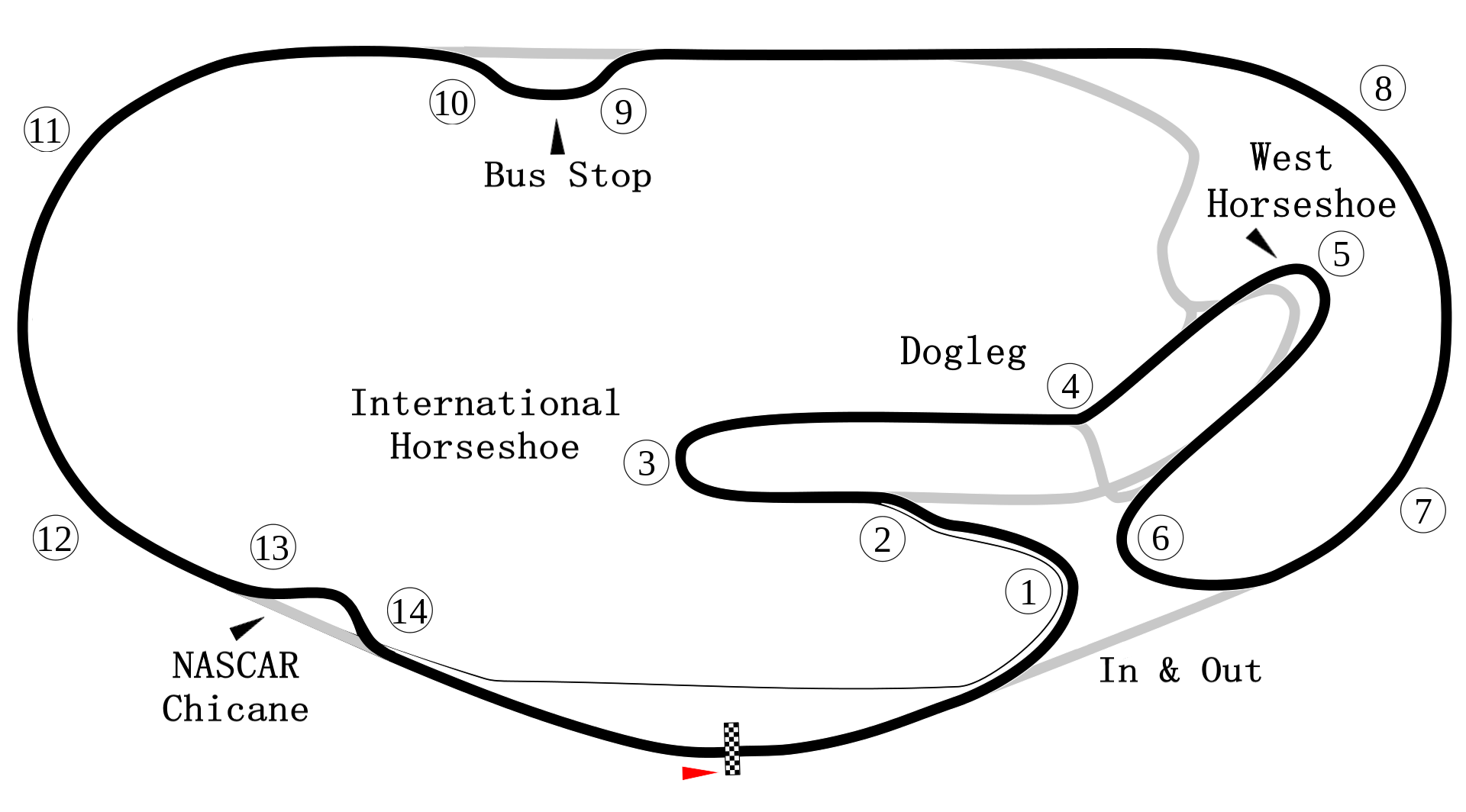
The layout of Daytona International Speedway NASCAR used.

The Daytona infield road course, which includes parts of the 2.5 mi (4.0 km) speedway oval, is most notably used for the 24 Hours of Daytona sports car race and Daytona 200 motorcycle race. In March 2020, NASCAR announced the NASCAR Cup Series' Busch Clash exhibition race would use the road course rather than the oval starting in 2021.

While the event was intended to be just a temporary race for 2020, it returned in 2021 after the Cup and Xfinity Series races at Auto Club Speedway were canceled due to concerns related to COVID-19. Although the Trucks did not have an Auto Club race, their round at Homestead–Miami Speedway was replaced for logistics reasons as Homestead weekend was moved back one week in order to keep the teams in Daytona a second consecutive week. The race became one of four Truck road course events, the most in series history.

#	Driver	Team	Make
1	Hailie Deegan	David Gilliland Racing	Ford
2	Sheldon Creed	GMS Racing	Chevrolet
02	Kaz Grala	Young's Motorsports	Chevrolet
3	Bobby Reuse	Jordan Anderson Racing	Chevrolet
4	John Hunter Nemechek	Kyle Busch Motorsports	Toyota
04	Cory Roper	Roper Racing	Ford
6	Norm Benning	Norm Benning Racing	Chevrolet
8	Camden Murphy	NEMCO Motorsports	Chevrolet
9	Codie Rohrbaugh	CR7 Motorsports	Chevrolet
10	Jennifer Jo Cobb	Jennifer Jo Cobb Racing	Chevrolet
12	Tate Fogleman	Young's Motorsports	Chevrolet
13	Johnny Sauter	ThorSport Racing	Toyota
15	Tanner Gray	David Gilliland Racing	Ford
16	Austin Hill	Hattori Racing Enterprises	Toyota
17	Riley Herbst	David Gilliland Racing	Ford
18	Chandler Smith	Kyle Busch Motorsports	Toyota
19	Derek Kraus	McAnally–Hilgemann Racing	Toyota
20	Spencer Boyd	Young's Motorsports	Chevrolet
21	Zane Smith	GMS Racing	Chevrolet
22	Austin Wayne Self	AM Racing	Chevrolet
23	Chase Purdy	GMS Racing	Chevrolet
24	Raphaël Lessard	GMS Racing	Chevrolet
25	Timothy Peters	Rackley W.A.R.	Chevrolet
26	Tyler Ankrum	GMS Racing	Chevrolet
30	Danny Bohn	On Point Motorsports	Toyota
33	Jason White	Reaume Brothers Racing	Chevrolet
34	Lawless Alan	Reaume Brothers Racing	Toyota
38	Todd Gilliland	Front Row Motorsports	Ford
40	Ryan Truex	Niece Motorsports	Chevrolet
41	Dawson Cram	Cram Racing Enterprises	Chevrolet
42	Carson Hocevar	Niece Motorsports	Chevrolet
44	Jett Noland	Niece Motorsports	Chevrolet
45	Brett Moffitt	Niece Motorsports	Chevrolet
49	Roger Reuse*	CMI Motorsports	Chevrolet
51	Parker Chase	Kyle Busch Motorsports	Toyota
52	Stewart Friesen	Halmar Friesen Racing	Toyota
56	Timmy Hill	Hill Motorsports	Chevrolet
75	Sam Mayer	Henderson Motorsports	Chevrolet
83	Tim Viens*	CMI Motorsports	Chevrolet
88	Matt Crafton	ThorSport Racing	Toyota
98	Christian Eckes	ThorSport Racing	Toyota
99	Ben Rhodes	ThorSport Racing	Toyota

*Withdrew for unknown reasons.

== Starting lineup ==
Qualifying was determined by a qualifying metric system based on the last race, the 2021 NextEra Energy 250 and owner's points. As a result, Ben Rhodes of ThorSport Racing would win the pole.

Pos.	#	Driver	Team	Make
1	99	Ben Rhodes	ThorSport Racing	Toyota
2	40	Ryan Truex	Niece Motorsports	Chevrolet
3	42	Carson Hocevar	Niece Motorsports	Chevrolet
4	4	John Hunter Nemechek	Kyle Busch Motorsports	Toyota
5	2	Sheldon Creed	GMS Racing	Chevrolet
6	04	Cory Roper	Roper Racing	Ford
7	9	Codie Rohrbaugh	CR7 Motorsports	Chevrolet
8	18	Chandler Smith	Kyle Busch Motorsports	Toyota
9	88	Matt Crafton	ThorSport Racing	Toyota
10	20	Spencer Boyd	Young's Motorsports	Chevrolet
11	21	Zane Smith	GMS Racing	Chevrolet
12	24	Raphaël Lessard	GMS Racing	Chevrolet
13	3	Bobby Reuse	Jordan Anderson Racing	Chevrolet
14	22	Austin Wayne Self	AM Racing	Chevrolet
15	30	Danny Bohn	On Point Motorsports	Toyota
16	98	Christian Eckes	ThorSport Racing	Toyota
17	10	Jennifer Jo Cobb	Jennifer Jo Cobb Racing	Chevrolet
18	33	Jason White	Reaume Brothers Racing	Chevrolet
19	13	Johnny Sauter	ThorSport Racing	Toyota
20	16	Austin Hill	Hattori Racing Enterprises	Toyota
21	45	Brett Moffitt	Niece Motorsports	Chevrolet
22	51	Parker Chase	Kyle Busch Motorsports	Toyota
23	1	Hailie Deegan	David Gilliland Racing	Ford
24	02	Kaz Grala	Young's Motorsports	Chevrolet
25	17	Riley Herbst	David Gilliland Racing	Ford
26	26	Tyler Ankrum	GMS Racing	Chevrolet
27	25	Timothy Peters	Rackley W.A.R.	Chevrolet
28	12	Tate Fogleman	Young's Motorsports	Chevrolet
29	23	Chase Purdy	GMS Racing	Chevrolet
30	52	Stewart Friesen	Halmar Friesen Racing	Toyota
31	19	Derek Kraus	McAnally–Hilgemann Racing	Toyota
32	38	Todd Gilliland	Front Row Motorsports	Ford
33	15	Tanner Gray	David Gilliland Racing	Ford
34	56	Timmy Hill	Hill Motorsports	Chevrolet
35	44	Jett Noland	Niece Motorsports	Chevrolet
36	75	Sam Mayer	Henderson Motorsports	Chevrolet
37	8	Camden Murphy	NEMCO Motorsports	Chevrolet
38	41	Dawson Cram	Cram Racing Enterprises	Chevrolet
39	6	Norm Benning	Norm Benning Racing	Chevrolet
40	34	Lawless Alan	Reaume Brothers Racing	Toyota
Withdrew
WD	49	Roger Reuse	CMI Motorsports	Chevrolet
WD	83	Tim Viens	CMI Motorsports	Chevrolet

== Race results ==
Stage 1 Laps: 12

Fin	#	Driver	Team	Make	Pts
1	4	John Hunter Nemechek	Kyle Busch Motorsports	Toyota	10
2	99	Ben Rhodes	ThorSport Racing	Toyota	9
3	18	Chandler Smith	Kyle Busch Motorsports	Toyota	8
4	45	Brett Moffitt	Niece Motorsports	Chevrolet	7
5	40	Ryan Truex	Niece Motorsports	Chevrolet	6
6	88	Matt Crafton	ThorSport Racing	Toyota	5
7	13	Johnny Sauter	ThorSport Racing	Toyota	4
8	16	Austin Hill	Hattori Racing Enterprises	Toyota	3
9	2	Sheldon Creed	GMS Racing	Chevrolet	2
10	17	Riley Herbst	David Gilliland Racing	Ford	0

Stage 2 Laps: 13

Fin	#	Driver	Team	Make	Pts
1	24	Raphaël Lessard	GMS Racing	Chevrolet	10
2	02	Kaz Grala	Young's Motorsports	Chevrolet	0
3	21	Zane Smith	GMS Racing	Chevrolet	8
4	22	Austin Wayne Self	AM Racing	Chevrolet	7
5	38	Todd Gilliland	Front Row Motorsports	Ford	6
6	88	Matt Crafton	ThorSport Racing	Toyota	5
7	1	Hailie Deegan	David Gilliland Racing	Ford	4
8	2	Sheldon Creed	GMS Racing	Chevrolet	3
9	23	Chase Purdy	GMS Racing	Chevrolet	2
10	15	Tanner Gray	David Gilliland Racing	Ford	1

Stage 3 Laps: 26

Fin	St	#	Driver	Team	Make	Laps	Led	Status	Pts
1	1	99	Ben Rhodes	ThorSport Racing	Toyota	51	13	running	49
2	5	2	Sheldon Creed	GMS Racing	Chevrolet	51	17	running	40
3	4	4	John Hunter Nemechek	Kyle Busch Motorsports	Toyota	51	14	running	44
4	32	38	Todd Gilliland	Front Row Motorsports	Ford	51	0	running	39
5	25	17	Riley Herbst	David Gilliland Racing	Ford	51	1	running	0
6	9	88	Matt Crafton	ThorSport Racing	Toyota	51	0	running	41
7	31	19	Derek Kraus	McAnally–Hilgemann Racing	Toyota	51	0	running	30
8	24	02	Kaz Grala	Young's Motorsports	Chevrolet	51	0	running	0
9	34	56	Timmy Hill	Hill Motorsports	Chevrolet	51	0	running	0
10	16	98	Christian Eckes	ThorSport Racing	Toyota	51	0	running	27
11	30	52	Stewart Friesen	Halmar Friesen Racing	Toyota	51	1	running	26
12	8	18	Chandler Smith	Kyle Busch Motorsports	Toyota	51	0	running	33
13	37	8	Camden Murphy	NEMCO Motorsports	Chevrolet	51	0	running	24
14	3	42	Carson Hocevar	Niece Motorsports	Chevrolet	51	0	running	23
15	14	22	Austin Wayne Self	AM Racing	Chevrolet	51	0	running	29
16	7	9	Codie Rohrbaugh	CR7 Motorsports	Chevrolet	51	0	running	21
17	38	41	Dawson Cram	Cram Racing Enterprises	Chevrolet	51	0	running	20
18	19	13	Johnny Sauter	ThorSport Racing	Toyota	51	0	running	23
19	28	12	Tate Fogleman	Young's Motorsports	Chevrolet	51	0	running	18
20	33	15	Tanner Gray	David Gilliland Racing	Ford	51	0	running	18
21	26	26	Tyler Ankrum	GMS Racing	Chevrolet	51	0	running	16
22	29	23	Chase Purdy	GMS Racing	Chevrolet	51	0	running	17
23	22	51	Parker Chase	Kyle Busch Motorsports	Toyota	51	0	running	14
24	27	25	Timothy Peters	Rackley W.A.R.	Chevrolet	51	0	running	13
25	21	45	Brett Moffitt	Niece Motorsports	Chevrolet	51	0	running	19
26	12	24	Raphaël Lessard	GMS Racing	Chevrolet	51	5	running	21
27	13	3	Bobby Reuse	Jordan Anderson Racing	Chevrolet	50	0	running	10
28	23	1	Hailie Deegan	David Gilliland Racing	Ford	50	0	running	13
29	35	44	Jett Noland	Niece Motorsports	Chevrolet	49	0	accident	8
30	15	30	Danny Bohn	On Point Motorsports	Toyota	49	0	running	7
31	2	40	Ryan Truex	Niece Motorsports	Chevrolet	48	0	running	12
32	39	6	Norm Benning	Norm Benning Racing	Chevrolet	48	0	running	5
33	20	16	Austin Hill	Hattori Racing Enterprises	Toyota	48	0	running	7
34	6	04	Cory Roper	Roper Racing	Ford	47	0	fuel pressure	3
35	17	10	Jennifer Jo Cobb	Jennifer Jo Cobb Racing	Chevrolet	47	0	running	2
36	40	34	Lawless Alan	Reaume Brothers Racing	Toyota	45	0	running	1
37	36	75	Sam Mayer	Henderson Motorsports	Chevrolet	41	0	accident	1
38	18	33	Jason White	Reaume Brothers Racing	Chevrolet	41	0	running	1
39	10	20	Spencer Boyd	Young's Motorsports	Chevrolet	38	0	transmission	1
40	11	21	Zane Smith	GMS Racing	Chevrolet	35	0	accident	9

Previous race: 2021 NextEra Energy 250	NASCAR Camping World Truck Series; 2021 season	Next race: 2021 Bucked Up 200
