= Trey Hutchens =

American racing driver

- Born: Robert Ray Hutchens III; May 20, 1998 (age 28); Lexington, North Carolina, U.S.

NASCAR FedEx Freight Truck Series career
- 13 races run over 7 years
- 2024 position: 74th
- Best finish: 54th (2019)
- First race: 2017 M&M's 200 (Iowa)
- Last race: 2024 Wright Brand 250 (North Wilkesboro)
Wins	Top tens	Poles
0	0	0

ARCA Menards Series East career
- 33 races run over 6 years
- Best finish: 14th (2017)
- First race: 2013 Visit Hampton VA 175 (Langley)
- Last race: 2018 United Site Services 70 (Loudon)
Wins	Top tens	Poles
0	6	0
- Statistics up to date as of November 8, 2024.

Robert Ray "Trey" Hutchens III (born May 20, 1998) is an American professional stock car racing driver. He last competed part-time in the NASCAR Craftsman Truck Series, driving the No. 14 Chevrolet Silverado for his family team, Trey Hutchens Racing. He has also competed in what is now the ARCA Menards Series East part-time since 2013, with most of his starts coming with his own team as well. Hutchens also drove in the former NASCAR Whelen Southern Modified Tour for two years.

== Racing career ==
=== Craftsman Truck Series ===
Hutchens debuted in the Truck Series in 2017 at Iowa, where he drove the No. 66 for Bolen Motorsports and finished 16th in that race.

Hutchens returned to the Truck Series in 2019 at Charlotte driving the No. 14 for his own team but failed to qualify. He did qualify for the Texas race in June and finished 24th. After failing to qualify for multiple races due to the large number of entries that year, Hutchens moved to the full-time No. 8 truck for NEMCO Motorsports to run at Iowa, the same thing that Tony Mrakovich had done with his upstart team.

Hutchens returned to his own No. 14 truck for the 2020 season, planning to make his first attempt of the season at Charlotte as he did the previous year. However, with no qualifying for the weekend and his team not having enough owner points, they were excluded from the race and failed to qualify again. He came back the next weekend at Atlanta Motor Speedway but failed to qualify again. Hutchens qualified at Kentucky Speedway, Michigan Speedway and Texas Motor Speedway, posting a best finish of 29th at Michigan.

He came back in 2021, but failed to qualify in the Fr8Auctions 200, ToyotaCare 250, WISE Power 200, and the LiftKits4Less.com 200. He did eventually qualify for his first North Carolina Education Lottery 200 after Spencer Davis and Ray Ciccarelli withdrew. He locked up in a bad crash with Johnny Sauter that obliterated Sauter's right side and Hutchens' driver side. Both drivers were okay. Drew Dollar though, survived the crash after spinning out from Sauter.

According to the entry list, Hutchens would make his first start of the 2022 season at Kansas Speedway. He made his first start in 2023 at Texas Motor Speedway but was taken out in a huge scary crash involving multiple trucks. He says he is not sure whether they will be able to run more races or not because they have a limited number of trucks and only one engine so if it got damaged then he probably would not make it back to the track this year.

== Personal life ==
Hutchens attended North Carolina State University where he majored in engineering and minored in computer programming. He also is a graduate of North Davidson High School, where he was the senior class president. He is the son of Bobby Hutchens Jr., a longtime NASCAR race team executive who worked in a variety of positions for Richard Childress Racing and was also the competition director for Stewart–Haas Racing and later JTG Daugherty Racing, and is currently the crew chief for his son's No. 14 truck.

Hutchens' mother, Sharon, died of breast cancer when he was age eleven and in middle school.

== Motorsports career results ==
=== NASCAR ===
(key) (Bold – Pole position awarded by qualifying time. Italics – Pole position earned by points standings or practice time. * – Most laps led.)

==== Craftsman Truck Series ====
NASCAR Craftsman Truck Series results
Year	Team	No.	Make	1	2	3	4	5	6	7	8	9	10	11	12	13	14	15	16	17	18	19	20	21	22	23	NCTC	Pts	Ref
2017	Bolen Motorsports	66	Chevy	DAY	ATL	MAR	KAN	CLT	DOV	TEX	GTW	IOW; 16	KEN	ELD	POC	MCH	BRI	MSP	CHI	NHA	LVS	TAL	MAR	TEX	PHO	HOM	57th	21	
2019	Trey Hutchens Racing	14	Chevy	DAY	ATL	LVS	MAR	TEX	DOV	KAN	CLT; DNQ	TEX; 24							MCH; 16	BRI	MSP	LVS	TAL	MAR	PHO	HOM	54th	42	
2019	NEMCO Motorsports	8	Chevy										IOW; 29	GTW	CHI	KEN	POC	ELD									54th	42	
2020	Trey Hutchens Racing	14	Chevy	DAY	LVS	CLT; DNQ	ATL; DNQ	HOM	POC	KEN; 36	TEX	KAN	KAN	MCH; 29	DRC	DOV	GTW	DAR	RCH	BRI	LVS	TAL	KAN	TEX; 36	MAR	PHO	67th	18	
2021	Trey Hutchens Racing	14	Chevy	DAY	DRC	LVS	ATL; DNQ	BRD	RCH; DNQ	KAN; DNQ	DAR; DNQ	COA	CLT; 32	TEX	NSH; 33	POC	KNX	GLN	GTW	DAR	BRI	LVS	TAL	MAR	PHO		80th	9	
2022	Trey Hutchens Racing	14	Chevy	DAY	LVS	ATL	COA	MAR	BRD	DAR	KAN; 29	TEX	CLT; Wth	GTW	SON	KNX	NSH; DNQ	MOH	POC	IRP	RCH; DNQ	KAN; DNQ	BRI	TAL	HOM	PHO	70th	8	
2023	Trey Hutchens Racing	14	Chevy	DAY	LVS	ATL	COA	TEX; 30	BRD	MAR	KAN	DAR	NWS	CLT	GTW	NSH; DNQ	MOH	POC	RCH; DNQ	IRP	MLW	KAN	BRI	TAL	HOM	PHO	75th	7	
2024	Trey Hutchens Racing	14	Chevy	DAY	ATL	LVS	BRI; 35	COA	MAR	TEX	KAN	DAR	NWS; 36	CLT	GTW	NSH	POC	IRP	RCH; DNQ	MLW	BRI	KAN	TAL	HOM	MAR	PHO	74th	3	

^{*} Season still in progress
^{1} Ineligible for series points

==== K&N Pro Series East ====
NASCAR K&N Pro Series East results
Year	Team	No.	Make	1	2	3	4	5	6	7	8	9	10	11	12	13	14	15	16	NKNPSEC	Pts	Ref
2013	Spraker Racing Enterprises	37	Chevy	BRI	GRE	FIF	RCH	BGS	IOW	LGY; 18	COL	IOW	VIR	GRE						31st	91	
2013	Trey Hutchens Racing	14	Chevy												NHA; 15					31st	91	
2013	Jim Weller Jr.	31	Chevy													DOV; 8	RAL			31st	91	
2014	Trey Hutchens Racing	14	Chevy	NSM	DAY	BRI; 33	GRE	RCH; 20		BGS; 17	FIF	LGY	NHA; 13	COL	IOW; 16	GLN	VIR			22nd	195	
2014	Trey Hutchens Racing	23	Chevy						IOW; 14											22nd	195	
2014	Hattori Racing Enterprises	1	Toyota															GRE; 17	DOV; 27	22nd	195	
2015	Trey Hutchens Racing	14	Chevy	NSM	GRE	BRI; 16					NHA; 17					RCH; 7	DOV; 15			20th	185	
2015	Trey Hutchens Racing	23	Chevy				IOW; 10	BGS	LGY	COL		IOW; 14	GLN	MOT	VIR					20th	185	
2016	Trey Hutchens Racing	14	Chevy	NSM; 14	MOB; 21	GRE; 20	BRI; 13					NHA; 8					DOV; 11			18th	230	
2016	Marsh Racing	31	Chevy					VIR; 24	DOM	STA	COL									18th	230	
2016	Trey Hutchens Racing	15	Chevy										IOW; 11	GLN	GRE	NJE				18th	230	
2017	Trey Hutchens Racing	14	Chevy	NSM; 15	GRE	BRI; 17	SBO	SBO	MEM; 10	BLN	TMP	NHA; 9	IOW; 30	GLN	LGY	NJE	DOV; 12			14th	171	
2018	Trey Hutchens Racing	14	Chevy	NSM	BRI	LGY	SBO	SBO	MEM; 15	NJE	TMP	NHA; 18	IOW	GLN	GTW	NHA	DOV			35th	55	

==== Whelen Southern Modified Tour ====
NASCAR Whelen Southern Modified Tour results
Year	Car owner	No.	Make	1	2	3	4	5	6	7	8	9	10	11	NWSMTC	Pts	Ref
2015	Trey Hutchens Racing	14	Chevy	CRW; DNQ	CRW; 14	SBO; 8	LGY; 13	CRW; 13	BGS; 14	BRI	LGY; 11	SBO; 9	CLT; 13		11th	281	
2016	Trey Hutchens Racing	14	Chevy	CRW	CON; 11	SBO	CRW	CRW; 10	BGS; 9	BRI	ECA; 9	SBO; 12	CRW; 11	CLT; 10	12th	236	
