= 2019 SpeedyCash.com 400 =

Motor race in Texas, USA

Race details
- Race 9 of 23 in the 2019 NASCAR Gander Outdoors Truck Series season
- Date: June 7, 2019
- Location: Texas Motor Speedway in Fort Worth, Texas
- Course: Permanent racing facility
- Course length: 1.5 miles (2.4 km)
- Distance: 167 laps, 250.5 mi (403.1 km)

Pole position
Driver	Todd Gilliland	Kyle Busch Motorsports
- Time: 29.227

Most laps led
Driver	Grant Enfinger	ThorSport Racing
- Laps: 44

Winner
No. 51	Greg Biffle	Kyle Busch Motorsports

Television in the United States
- Network: FS1

Radio in the United States
- Radio: MRN

The 2019 SpeedyCash.com 400 was a NASCAR Gander Outdoors Truck Series race held on June 7, 2019, at Texas Motor Speedway in Fort Worth, Texas. Contested over 167 laps on the 1.5-mile (2.4 km) intermediate quad-oval, it was the ninth race of the 2019 NASCAR Gander Outdoors Truck Series season.

== Background ==
=== Track ===
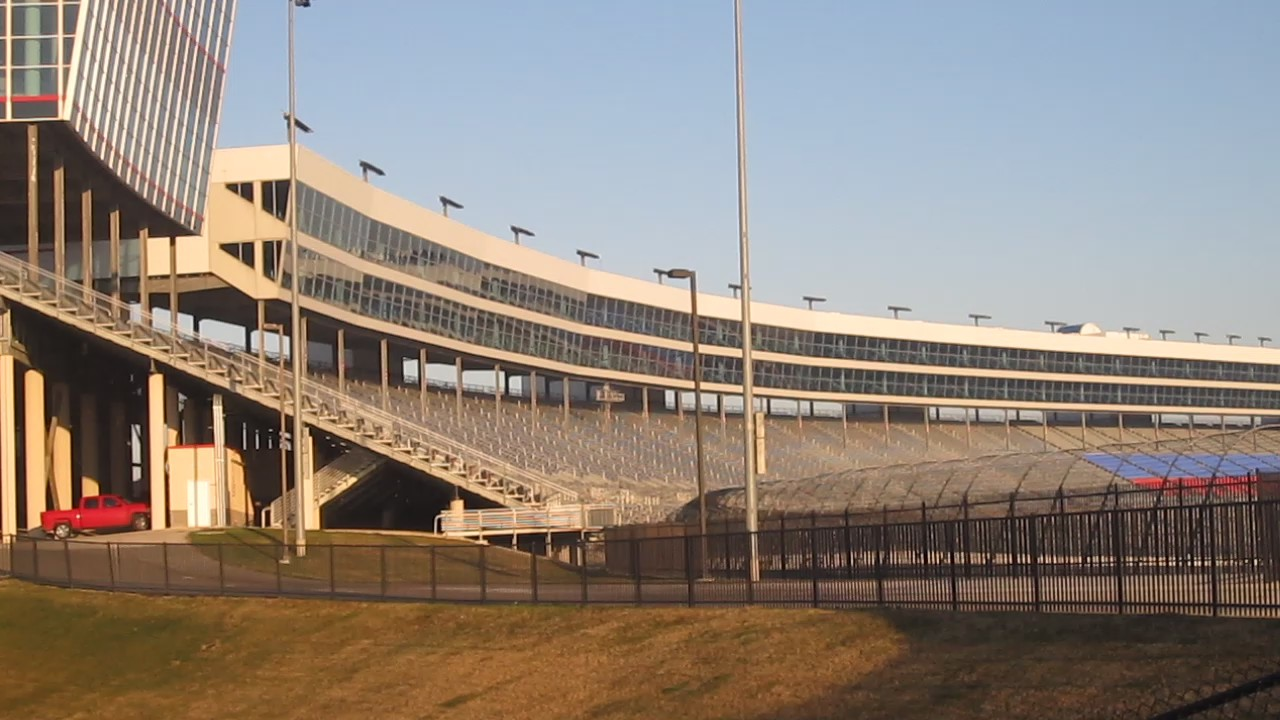
Texas Motor Speedway, the track where the race was held.

Texas Motor Speedway is a speedway located in the northernmost portion of the U.S. city of Fort Worth, Texas – the portion located in Denton County, Texas. The track measures 1.5 miles (2.4 km) around and is banked 24 degrees in the turns, and is of the oval design, where the front straightaway juts outward slightly. The track layout is similar to Atlanta Motor Speedway and Charlotte Motor Speedway (formerly Lowe's Motor Speedway). The track is owned by Speedway Motorsports, Inc., the same company that owns Atlanta and Charlotte Motor Speedways, as well as the short-track Bristol Motor Speedway.

== Entry list ==
Among the entered drivers was Greg Biffle, the 2000 Truck Series champion. Biffle's previous race was in the 2016 Cup Series. His previous truck race was in the 2004 season.

No.	Driver	Team	Manufacturer
02	Tyler Dippel (R)	Young's Motorsports	Chevrolet
2	Sheldon Creed (R)	GMS Racing	Chevrolet
3	Jordan Anderson	Jordan Anderson Racing	Chevrolet
04	Cory Roper	Roper Racing	Ford
4	Todd Gilliland	Kyle Busch Motorsports	Toyota
6	Norm Benning	Norm Benning Racing	Chevrolet
8	Tony Mrakovich	NEMCO Motorsports	Chevrolet
9	Codie Rohrbaugh	Grant County Mulch Racing	Chevrolet
10	Jennifer Jo Cobb	Jennifer Jo Cobb Racing	Chevrolet
12	Gus Dean (R)	Young's Motorsports	Chevrolet
13	Johnny Sauter	ThorSport Racing	Ford
14	Trey Hutchens	Trey Hutchens Racing	Chevrolet
15	Anthony Alfredo (R)	DGR-Crosley	Toyota
16	Austin Hill	Hattori Racing Enterprises	Toyota
17	Tyler Ankrum (R)	DGR-Crosley	Toyota
18	Harrison Burton (R)	Kyle Busch Motorsports	Toyota
20	Spencer Boyd (R)	Young's Motorsports	Chevrolet
22	Austin Wayne Self	AM Racing	Chevrolet
24	Brett Moffitt	GMS Racing	Chevrolet
25	Ted Minor	Ted Minor Motorsports	Chevrolet
30	Brennan Poole (R)	On Point Motorsports	Toyota
33	Josh Reaume	Reaume Brothers Racing	Chevrolet
34	Scott Stenzel	Reaume Brothers Racing	Chevrolet
38	Ross Chastain	Niece Motorsports	Chevrolet
44	Angela Ruch	Niece Motorsports	Chevrolet
45	Kyle Benjamin	Niece Motorsports	Chevrolet
51	Greg Biffle	Kyle Busch Motorsports	Toyota
52	Stewart Friesen	Halmar Friesen Racing	Chevrolet
54	Natalie Decker (R)	DGR-Crosley	Toyota
87	Joe Nemechek	NEMCO Motorsports	Chevrolet
88	Matt Crafton	ThorSport Racing	Ford
98	Grant Enfinger	ThorSport Racing	Ford
99	Ben Rhodes	ThorSport Racing	Ford

== Practice ==
=== First practice ===
Ben Rhodes was the fastest in the first practice session with a time of 29.887 seconds and a speed of 180.681 mph (290.778 km/h).

Pos	No.	Driver	Team	Manufacturer	Time	Speed
1	99	Ben Rhodes	ThorSport Racing	Ford	29.887	180.681
2	13	Johnny Sauter	ThorSport Racing	Ford	29.938	180.373
3	98	Grant Enfinger	ThorSport Racing	Ford	29.976	180.144

=== Second practice ===
Johnny Sauter was the fastest in the second practice session with a time of 29.321 seconds and a speed of 184.168 mph (296.390 km/h).

Pos	No.	Driver	Team	Manufacturer	Time	Speed
1	13	Johnny Sauter	ThorSport Racing	Ford	29.321	184.168
2	98	Grant Enfinger	ThorSport Racing	Ford	29.401	183.667
3	2	Sheldon Creed (R)	GMS Racing	Chevrolet	29.501	183.045

=== Final practice ===
Johnny Sauter was the fastest in the final practice session with a time of 29.470 seconds and a speed of 183.237 mph (294.891 km/h).

Pos	No.	Driver	Team	Manufacturer	Time	Speed
1	13	Johnny Sauter	ThorSport Racing	Ford	29.470	183.237
2	88	Matt Crafton	ThorSport Racing	Ford	29.486	183.138
3	16	Austin Hill	Hattori Racing Enterprises	Toyota	29.499	183.057

== Qualifying ==
Todd Gilliland scored the pole for the race with a time of 29.227 seconds and a speed of 184.761 mph (297.344 km/h).

=== Qualifying results ===
Pos	No	Driver	Team	Manufacturer	Time
1	4	Todd Gilliland	Kyle Busch Motorsports	Toyota	29.227
2	13	Johnny Sauter	ThorSport Racing	Ford	29.247
3	98	Grant Enfinger	ThorSport Racing	Ford	29.310
4	24	Brett Moffitt	GMS Racing	Chevrolet	29.360
5	16	Austin Hill	Hattori Racing Enterprises	Toyota	29.406
6	51	Greg Biffle	Kyle Busch Motorsports	Toyota	29.413
7	2	Sheldon Creed (R)	GMS Racing	Chevrolet	29.430
8	17	Tyler Ankrum (R)	DGR-Crosley	Toyota	29.507
9	45	Kyle Benjamin	Niece Motorsports	Chevrolet	29.514
10	88	Matt Crafton	ThorSport Racing	Ford	29.529
11	18	Harrison Burton (R)	Kyle Busch Motorsports	Toyota	29.548
12	02	Tyler Dippel (R)	Young's Motorsports	Chevrolet	29.556
13	15	Anthony Alfredo (R)	DGR-Crosley	Toyota	29.585
14	52	Stewart Friesen	Halmar Friesen Racing	Chevrolet	29.630
15	38	Ross Chastain	Niece Motorsports	Chevrolet	29.692
16	9	Codie Rohrbaugh	Grant County Mulch Racing	Chevrolet	29.704
17	12	Gus Dean (R)	Young's Motorsports	Chevrolet	29.725
18	30	Brennan Poole (R)	On Point Motorsports	Toyota	29.740
19	22	Austin Wayne Self	AM Racing	Chevrolet	29.746
20	04	Cory Roper	Roper Racing	Ford	29.761
21	87	Joe Nemechek	NEMCO Motorsports	Chevrolet	29.931
22	99	Ben Rhodes	ThorSport Racing	Ford	29.986
23	33	Josh Reaume	Reaume Brothers Racing	Chevrolet	30.061
24	14	Trey Hutchens	Trey Hutchens Racing	Chevrolet	30.204
25	44	Angela Ruch	Niece Motorsports	Chevrolet	30.244
26	8	Tony Mrakovich	NEMCO Motorsports	Chevrolet	30.289
27	20	Spencer Boyd (R)	Young's Motorsports	Chevrolet	30.318
28	3	Jordan Anderson	Jordan Anderson Racing	Chevrolet	30.507
29	34	Scott Stenzel	Reaume Brothers Racing	Chevrolet	30.605
30	10	Jennifer Jo Cobb	Jennifer Jo Cobb Racing	Chevrolet	31.249
31	6	Norm Benning	Norm Benning Racing	Chevrolet	31.994
32	54	Natalie Decker (R)	DGR-Crosley	Toyota	33.034
Did not qualify
33	25	Ted Minor	Ted Minor Motorsports	Chevrolet	32.989

== Race ==
=== Summary ===
Todd Gilliland started on pole, but lost the lead to Grant Enfinger within 5 laps. Four of the five cautions during stage 1 occurred due to drivers spinning out in Turn 2 and wrecking their trucks. Johnny Sauter avoided the wrecks to win the stage. In stage 2, Sauter made contact with Austin Hill, causing Sauter's truck to back into the wall and accumulate damage.

Gilliland later got loose under Ben Rhodes, backing his truck into the fence. He earned his second DNF of the season, knocking him below the playoff cutline. This would also cause team owner Kyle Busch to deliver critical comments about the performances of the team's full-time drivers, none of which had won a race thus far.

In the final restart with less than 10 laps remaining, Greg Biffle stayed out during pit stops. He was able to conserve fuel and hold off Matt Crafton, winning his first truck race in over 15 years. It would ultimately be Biffle's final NASCAR win before his passing in a plane crash in 2025.

=== Stage Results ===
Stage One Laps: 40

Pos	No	Driver	Team	Manufacturer	Points
1	13	Johnny Sauter	ThorSport Racing	Ford	10
2	16	Austin Hill	Hattori Racing Enterprises	Toyota	9
3	98	Grant Enfinger	ThorSport Racing	Ford	8
4	38	Ross Chastain	Niece Motorsports	Chevrolet	7
5	88	Matt Crafton	ThorSport Racing	Ford	6
6	02	Tyler Dippel (R)	Young's Motorsports	Chevrolet	5
7	4	Todd Gilliland	Kyle Busch Motorsports	Toyota	4
8	2	Sheldon Creed (R)	GMS Racing	Chevrolet	3
9	3	Jordan Anderson	Jordan Anderson Racing	Chevrolet	2
10	18	Harrison Burton (R)	Kyle Busch Motorsports	Toyota	1

Stage Two Laps: 40

Pos	No	Driver	Team	Manufacturer	Points
1	99	Ben Rhodes	ThorSport Racing	Ford	10
2	52	Stewart Friesen	Halmar Friesen Racing	Chevrolet	9
3	18	Harrison Burton (R)	Kyle Busch Motorsports	Toyota	8
4	98	Grant Enfinger	ThorSport Racing	Ford	7
5	30	Brennan Poole (R)	On Point Motorsports	Toyota	6
6	51	Greg Biffle	Kyle Busch Motorsports	Toyota	5
7	38	Ross Chastain	Niece Motorsports	Chevrolet	4
8	88	Matt Crafton	ThorSport Racing	Ford	3
9	02	Tyler Dippel (R)	Young's Motorsports	Chevrolet	2
10	2	Sheldon Creed (R)	GMS Racing	Chevrolet	1

=== Final Stage Results ===
Stage Three Laps: 87

Pos	Grid	No	Driver	Team	Manufacturer	Laps	Points
1	6	51	Greg Biffle	Kyle Busch Motorsports	Toyota	167	45
2	10	88	Matt Crafton	ThorSport Racing	Ford	167	44
3	8	17	Tyler Ankrum (R)	DGR-Crosley	Toyota	167	34
4	3	98	Grant Enfinger	ThorSport Racing	Ford	167	48
5	11	18	Harrison Burton (R)	Kyle Busch Motorsports	Toyota	167	41
6	7	2	Sheldon Creed (R)	GMS Racing	Chevrolet	167	35
7	18	30	Brennan Poole (R)	On Point Motorsports	Toyota	167	36
8	5	16	Austin Hill	Hattori Racing Enterprises	Toyota	167	38
9	20	04	Cory Roper	Roper Racing	Ford	167	28
10	15	38	Ross Chastain	Niece Motorsports	Chevrolet	166	38
11	4	24	Brett Moffitt	GMS Racing	Chevrolet	166	26
12	13	15	Anthony Alfredo (R)	DGR-Crosley	Toyota	166	25
13	2	13	Johnny Sauter	ThorSport Racing	Ford	166	34
14	23	33	Josh Reaume	Reaume Brothers Racing	Chevrolet	166	23
15	28	3	Jordan Anderson	Jordan Anderson Racing	Chevrolet	165	24
16	29	34	Scott Stenzel	Reaume Brothers Racing	Chevrolet	165	21
17	31	6	Norm Benning	Norm Benning Racing	Chevrolet	164	20
18	30	10	Jennifer Jo Cobb	Jennifer Jo Cobb Racing	Chevrolet	162	19
19	19	22	Austin Wayne Self	AM Racing	Chevrolet	136	18
20	14	52	Stewart Friesen	Halmar Friesen Racing	Chevrolet	117	26
21	22	99	Ben Rhodes	ThorSport Racing	Ford	104	26
22	32	54	Natalie Decker (R)	DGR-Crosley	Toyota	95	15
23	27	20	Spencer Boyd (R)	Young's Motorsports	Chevrolet	95	14
24	24	14	Trey Hutchens	Trey Hutchens Racing	Chevrolet	95	13
25	12	02	Tyler Dippel (R)	Young's Motorsports	Chevrolet	89	19
26	26	8	Tony Mrakovich	NEMCO Motorsports	Chevrolet	85	11
27	1	4	Todd Gilliland	Kyle Busch Motorsports	Toyota	69	14
28	21	87	Joe Nemechek	NEMCO Motorsports	Chevrolet	48	9
29	25	44	Angela Ruch	Niece Motorsports	Chevrolet	33	8
30	16	9	Codie Rohrbaugh	Grant County Mulch Racing	Chevrolet	27	7
31	9	45	Kyle Benjamin	Niece Motorsports	Chevrolet	20	6
32	17	12	Gus Dean (R)	Young's Motorsports	Chevrolet	10	5

Previous race: 2019 North Carolina Education Lottery 200	NASCAR Gander Outdoors Truck Series; 2019 season	Next race: 2019 M&M's 200
