= 2022 Kansas Lottery 200 =

19th race of the 2022 NASCAR Camping World Truck Series

Race details
- Race 19 of 23 of the 2022 NASCAR Camping World Truck Series
- Date: September 9, 2022
- Official name: 2nd Annual Kansas Lottery 200
- Location: Kansas Speedway, Kansas City, Kansas
- Course: Permanent racing facility
- Course length: 1.5 miles (2.4 km)
- Distance: 134 laps, 201 mi (323 km)
- Average speed: 118.023 mph (189.940 km/h)

Pole position
Driver	John Hunter Nemechek	Kyle Busch Motorsports
- Time: 30.779

Most laps led
Driver	John Hunter Nemechek	Kyle Busch Motorsports
- Laps: 88

Winner
No. 4	John Hunter Nemechek	Kyle Busch Motorsports

Television in the United States
- Network: Fox Sports 1
- Announcers: Vince Welch, Michael Waltrip, and Phil Parsons

Radio in the United States
- Radio: Motor Racing Network

The 2022 Kansas Lottery 200 was the 19th stock car race of the 2022 NASCAR Camping World Truck Series, the final race of the Round of 10, and the 2nd iteration of the event. The race was held on Friday, September 9, 2022, in Kansas City, Kansas at Kansas Speedway, a 1.5 miles (2.4 km) permanent oval-shaped racetrack. The race took the scheduled 134 laps to complete. In an exciting battle on the final lap, John Hunter Nemechek, driving for Kyle Busch Motorsports, took over the lead from Carson Hocevar, and earned his 13th career NASCAR Camping World Truck Series win, and his second of the season. Nemechek dominated the entire race as well, leading 88 laps. Hocevar had attempted to win the race on fuel milage, but was unsuccessful as he ran out of fuel on the last lap. To fill out the podium, Ryan Preece, driving for David Gilliland Racing, would finish 3rd, respectively.

Zane Smith, Chandler Smith, John Hunter Nemechek, Grant Enfinger, Ben Rhodes, Stewart Friesen, Ty Majeski, Christian Eckes, would advance into the Round of 8. Hocevar and Matt Crafton would fail to advance.

== Background ==
Kansas Speedway is a 1.5-mile (2.4 km) tri-oval race track in the Village West area near Kansas City, Kansas, United States. It was built in 2001 and it currently hosts two annual NASCAR race weekends. The IndyCar Series also held races at the venue until 2011. The speedway is owned and operated by NASCAR.

=== Entry list ===
- (R) - denotes rookie driver
- (i) - denotes driver who is ineligible for series driver points.

#	Driver	Team	Make
1	Hailie Deegan	David Gilliland Racing	Ford
02	Kaz Grala	Young's Motorsports	Chevrolet
4	John Hunter Nemechek	Kyle Busch Motorsports	Toyota
5	Tyler Hill	Hill Motorsports	Toyota
9	Blaine Perkins (R)	CR7 Motorsports	Chevrolet
12	Spencer Boyd	Young's Motorsports	Chevrolet
14	Trey Hutchens	Trey Hutchens Racing	Chevrolet
15	Tanner Gray	David Gilliland Racing	Ford
16	Tyler Ankrum	Hattori Racing Enterprises	Toyota
17	Ryan Preece	David Gilliland Racing	Ford
18	Chandler Smith	Kyle Busch Motorsports	Toyota
19	Derek Kraus	McAnally–Hilgemann Racing	Chevrolet
20	Jesse Little	Young's Motorsports	Chevrolet
22	Brett Moffitt (i)	AM Racing	Chevrolet
23	Grant Enfinger	GMS Racing	Chevrolet
24	Jack Wood (R)	GMS Racing	Chevrolet
25	Matt DiBenedetto	Rackley W.A.R.	Chevrolet
26	Tate Fogleman	Rackley W.A.R.	Chevrolet
30	Kaden Honeycutt	On Point Motorsports	Toyota
32	Bret Holmes	Bret Holmes Racing	Chevrolet
33	Mason Maggio	Reaume Brothers Racing	Toyota
38	Zane Smith	Front Row Motorsports	Ford
40	Dean Thompson (R)	Niece Motorsports	Chevrolet
42	Carson Hocevar	Niece Motorsports	Chevrolet
43	Armani Williams	Reaume Brothers Racing	Chevrolet
44	Bayley Currey (i)	Niece Motorsports	Chevrolet
45	Lawless Alan (R)	Niece Motorsports	Chevrolet
46	Brennan Poole	G2G Racing	Toyota
51	Corey Heim (R)	Kyle Busch Motorsports	Toyota
52	Stewart Friesen	Halmar Friesen Racing	Toyota
56	Timmy Hill	Hill Motorsports	Toyota
61	Chase Purdy	Hattori Racing Enterprises	Toyota
66	Ty Majeski	ThorSport Racing	Toyota
75	Parker Kligerman	Henderson Motorsports	Toyota
88	Matt Crafton	ThorSport Racing	Toyota
91	Colby Howard	McAnally–Hilgemann Racing	Chevrolet
98	Christian Eckes	ThorSport Racing	Toyota
99	Ben Rhodes	ThorSport Racing	Toyota
Official entry list

== Practice ==
The only 30-minute practice session was held on Friday, September 9, at 2:00 PM CST. Matt Crafton, driving for ThorSport Racing, was the fastest in the session, with a lap of 31.171, and an average speed of 173.238 mph (278.800 km/h).

Pos.	#	Driver	Team	Make	Time	Speed
1	88	Matt Crafton	ThorSport Racing	Toyota	31.171	173.238
2	66	Ty Majeski	ThorSport Racing	Toyota	31.400	171.975
3	98	Christian Eckes	ThorSport Racing	Toyota	31.431	171.805
Full practice results

== Qualifying ==
Qualifying was held on Friday, September 9, at 2:30 PM CST. Since Kansas Speedway is an oval track, the qualifying system used is a single-car, one-lap system with only one round. Whoever sets the fastest time in the round wins the pole. John Hunter Nemechek, driving for Kyle Busch Motorsports, scored the pole for the race, with a lap of 30.779, and an average speed of 175.444 mph (282.350 km/h).

Pos.	#	Driver	Team	Make	Time	Speed
1	4	John Hunter Nemechek	Kyle Busch Motorsports	Toyota	30.779	175.444
2	66	Ty Majeski	ThorSport Racing	Toyota	30.825	175.182
3	51	Corey Heim (R)	Kyle Busch Motorsports	Toyota	30.891	174.808
4	98	Christian Eckes	ThorSport Racing	Toyota	30.927	174.605
5	18	Chandler Smith	Kyle Busch Motorsports	Toyota	31.034	174.003
6	99	Ben Rhodes	ThorSport Racing	Toyota	31.082	173.734
7	17	Ryan Preece	David Gilliland Racing	Ford	31.092	173.678
8	88	Matt Crafton	ThorSport Racing	Toyota	31.119	173.527
9	38	Zane Smith	Front Row Motorsports	Ford	31.129	173.472
10	15	Tanner Gray	David Gilliland Racing	Ford	31.162	173.288
11	52	Stewart Friesen	Halmar Friesen Racing	Toyota	31.219	172.972
12	23	Grant Enfinger	GMS Racing	Chevrolet	31.265	172.717
13	19	Derek Kraus	McAnally–Hilgemann Racing	Chevrolet	31.409	171.925
14	25	Matt DiBenedetto	Rackley W.A.R.	Chevrolet	31.468	171.603
15	42	Carson Hocevar	Niece Motorsports	Chevrolet	31.475	171.565
16	44	Bayley Currey (i)	Niece Motorsports	Chevrolet	31.537	171.227
17	1	Hailie Deegan	David Gilliland Racing	Ford	31.544	171.189
18	91	Colby Howard	McAnally–Hilgemann Racing	Chevrolet	31.567	171.065
19	16	Tyler Ankrum	Hattori Racing Enterprises	Toyota	31.595	170.913
20	22	Brett Moffitt (i)	AM Racing	Chevrolet	31.664	170.541
21	30	Kaden Honeycutt	On Point Motorsports	Toyota	31.702	170.336
22	61	Chase Purdy	Hattori Racing Enterprises	Toyota	31.738	170.143
23	40	Dean Thompson (R)	Niece Motorsports	Chevrolet	31.761	170.020
24	75	Parker Kligerman	Henderson Motorsports	Toyota	31.787	169.881
25	56	Timmy Hill	Hill Motorsports	Toyota	31.878	169.396
26	32	Bret Holmes	Bret Holmes Racing	Chevrolet	31.907	169.242
27	24	Jack Wood (R)	GMS Racing	Chevrolet	31.948	169.025
28	45	Lawless Alan (R)	Niece Motorsports	Chevrolet	31.958	168.972
29	9	Blaine Perkins (R)	CR7 Motorsports	Chevrolet	32.105	168.198
30	02	Kaz Grala	Young's Motorsports	Chevrolet	32.131	168.062
31	46	Brennan Poole	G2G Racing	Toyota	32.322	167.069
Qualified by owner's points
32	5	Tyler Hill	Hill Motorsports	Toyota	32.396	166.687
33	20	Jesse Little	Young's Motorsports	Chevrolet	32.503	166.139
34	12	Spencer Boyd	Young's Motorsports	Chevrolet	32.911	164.079
35	43	Armani Williams	Reaume Brothers Racing	Chevrolet	33.323	162.050
36	33	Mason Maggio	Reaume Brothers Racing	Toyota	33.731	160.090
Failed to qualify
37	26	Tate Fogleman	Rackley W.A.R.	Chevrolet	32.542	165.939
38	14	Trey Hutchens	Trey Hutchens Racing	Chevrolet	32.810	164.584
Official qualifying results
Official starting lineup

== Race results ==
Stage 1 Laps: 30

Pos.	#	Driver	Team	Make	Pts
1	4	John Hunter Nemechek	Kyle Busch Motorsports	Toyota	10
2	66	Ty Majeski	ThorSport Racing	Toyota	9
3	98	Christian Eckes	ThorSport Racing	Toyota	8
4	51	Corey Heim (R)	Kyle Busch Motorsports	Toyota	7
5	38	Zane Smith	Front Row Motorsports	Ford	6
6	17	Ryan Preece	David Gilliland Racing	Ford	5
7	19	Derek Kraus	McAnally–Hilgemann Racing	Chevrolet	4
8	18	Chandler Smith	Kyle Busch Motorsports	Toyota	3
9	88	Matt Crafton	ThorSport Racing	Toyota	2
10	15	Tanner Gray	David Gilliland Racing	Ford	1

Stage 2 Laps: 30

Pos.	#	Driver	Team	Make	Pts
1	4	John Hunter Nemechek	Kyle Busch Motorsports	Toyota	10
2	38	Zane Smith	Front Row Motorsports	Ford	9
3	17	Ryan Preece	David Gilliland Racing	Ford	8
4	98	Christian Eckes	ThorSport Racing	Toyota	7
5	51	Corey Heim (R)	Kyle Busch Motorsports	Toyota	6
6	66	Ty Majeski	ThorSport Racing	Toyota	5
7	16	Tyler Ankrum	Hattori Racing Enterprises	Toyota	4
8	19	Derek Kraus	McAnally–Hilgemann Racing	Chevrolet	3
9	88	Matt Crafton	ThorSport Racing	Toyota	2
10	42	Carson Hocevar	Niece Motorsports	Chevrolet	1

Stage 3 Laps: 74

Fin.	St	#	Driver	Team	Make	Laps	Led	Status	Pts
1	1	4	John Hunter Nemechek	Kyle Busch Motorsports	Toyota	134	88	Running	60
2	15	42	Carson Hocevar	Niece Motorsports	Chevrolet	134	28	Running	36
3	7	17	Ryan Preece	David Gilliland Racing	Ford	134	0	Running	47
4	9	38	Zane Smith	Front Row Motorsports	Ford	134	2	Running	48
5	12	23	Grant Enfinger	GMS Racing	Chevrolet	134	1	Running	32
6	5	18	Chandler Smith	Kyle Busch Motorsports	Toyota	134	0	Running	34
7	3	51	Corey Heim (R)	Kyle Busch Motorsports	Toyota	134	0	Running	43
8	2	66	Ty Majeski	ThorSport Racing	Toyota	134	14	Running	43
9	18	91	Colby Howard	McAnally–Hilgemann Racing	Chevrolet	134	0	Running	28
10	4	98	Christian Eckes	ThorSport Racing	Toyota	134	1	Running	42
11	24	75	Parker Kligerman	Henderson Motorsports	Toyota	134	0	Running	26
12	14	25	Matt DiBenedetto	Rackley W.A.R.	Chevrolet	134	0	Running	25
13	6	99	Ben Rhodes	ThorSport Racing	Toyota	134	0	Running	24
14	19	16	Tyler Ankrum	Hattori Racing Enterprises	Toyota	134	0	Running	27
15	8	88	Matt Crafton	ThorSport Racing	Toyota	133	0	Running	26
16	10	15	Tanner Gray	David Gilliland Racing	Ford	133	0	Running	22
17	26	32	Bret Holmes	Bret Holmes Racing	Chevrolet	133	0	Running	20
18	30	02	Kaz Grala	Young's Motorsports	Chevrolet	133	0	Running	19
19	25	56	Timmy Hill	Hill Motorsports	Toyota	133	0	Running	18
20	11	52	Stewart Friesen	Halmar Friesen Racing	Toyota	133	0	Running	17
21	13	19	Derek Kraus	McAnally–Hilgemann Racing	Chevrolet	133	0	Running	23
22	17	1	Hailie Deegan	David Gilliland Racing	Ford	133	0	Running	15
23	23	40	Dean Thompson (R)	Niece Motorsports	Chevrolet	133	0	Running	14
24	21	30	Kaden Honeycutt	On Point Motorsports	Toyota	133	0	Running	13
25	22	61	Chase Purdy	Hattori Racing Enterprises	Toyota	132	0	Running	12
26	27	24	Jack Wood (R)	GMS Racing	Chevrolet	132	0	Running	11
27	16	44	Bayley Currey (i)	Niece Motorsports	Chevrolet	132	0	Running	0
28	33	20	Jesse Little	Young's Motorsports	Chevrolet	132	0	Running	9
29	32	5	Tyler Hill	Hill Motorsports	Toyota	130	0	Running	8
30	29	9	Blaine Perkins (R)	CR7 Motorsports	Chevrolet	130	0	Running	7
31	28	45	Lawless Alan (R)	Niece Motorsports	Chevrolet	130	0	Running	6
32	36	33	Mason Maggio	Reaume Brothers Racing	Toyota	126	0	Running	5
33	34	12	Spencer Boyd	Young's Motorsports	Chevrolet	124	0	Running	4
34	31	46	Brennan Poole	G2G Racing	Toyota	123	0	Running	3
35	35	43	Armani Williams	Reaume Brothers Racing	Chevrolet	86	0	Too Slow	2
36	20	22	Brett Moffitt (i)	AM Racing	Chevrolet	73	0	Engine	0
Official race results

== Standings after the race ==
Drivers' Championship standings

	Pos	Driver	Points
1	1	Zane Smith	3,037
1	2	Chandler Smith	3,028 (-9)
	3	John Hunter Nemechek	3,024 (-13)
3	4	Ben Rhodes	3,017 (-20)
1	5	Stewart Friesen	3,013 (-24)
1	6	Ty Majeski	3,008 (-29)
5	7	Grant Enfinger	3,007 (-30)
2	8	Christian Eckes	3,007 (-30)
	9	Carson Hocevar	2,099 (-938)
2	10	Matt Crafton	2,092 (-945)
Official driver's standings

- Note: Only the first 10 positions are included for the driver standings.

Previous race: 2022 Worldwide Express 250	NASCAR Camping World Truck Series; 2022 season	Next race: 2022 UNOH 200
