= 2022 Rackley Roofing 200 =

14th race of the 2022 NASCAR Camping World Truck Series

Race details
- Race 14 of 23 of the 2022 NASCAR Camping World Truck Series
- Date: June 24, 2022
- Official name: 13th Annual Rackley Roofing 200
- Location: Nashville Superspeedway, Gladeville, Tennessee
- Course: Permanent racing facility
- Course length: 1.333 miles (2.145 km)
- Distance: 150 laps, 199.5 mi (321.1 km)
- Average speed: 102.717 mph (165.307 km/h)

Pole position
Driver	Ryan Preece	David Gilliland Racing
- Time: 29.753

Most laps led
Driver	Ryan Preece	David Gilliland Racing
- Laps: 74

Winner
No. 17	Ryan Preece	David Gilliland Racing

Television in the United States
- Network: Fox Sports 1
- Announcers: Vince Welch, Phil Parsons, and Michael Waltrip

Radio in the United States
- Radio: Motor Racing Network

The 2022 Rackley Roofing 200 was the fourteenth stock car race of the 2022 NASCAR Camping World Truck Series, and the 13th iteration of the event. The race was held on Friday, June 24, 2022, in Gladeville, Tennessee at Nashville Superspeedway, a 1.333 miles (2.145 km) permanent D-shaped racetrack. The race took its scheduled 150 laps to complete. Ryan Preece, driving for David Gilliland Racing, would start from the pole, lead the most laps, and earn his 2nd career NASCAR Camping World Truck Series win, along with his first of the season. To fill out the podium, Zane Smith, driving for Front Row Motorsports, and Carson Hocevar, driving for Niece Motorsports, would finish 2nd and 3rd, respectively.

== Background ==
Nashville Superspeedway is a motor racing complex located in Lebanon, Tennessee. The track was built in 2001 and is currently hosting NASCAR and IndyCar Series races.

It is a concrete oval track 1 1/3 miles (2.145 km) long. Nashville Superspeedway is owned by Speedway Motorsports, which acquired the track's previous owner Dover Motorsports in December 2021. Nashville Superspeedway is the longest concrete oval in NASCAR. Current permanent seating capacity is approximately 25,000, but will reach up to 38,000. Additional portable seats are brought in for some events, and seating capacity can be expanded to 150,000. Infrastructure is in place to expand the facility to include a short track, drag strip, and road course.

=== Entry list ===
- (R) denotes rookie driver.

#	Driver	Team	Make
1	Hailie Deegan	David Gilliland Racing	Ford
02	Jesse Little	Young's Motorsports	Chevrolet
4	John Hunter Nemechek	Kyle Busch Motorsports	Toyota
9	Blaine Perkins (R)	CR7 Motorsports	Chevrolet
10	Jennifer Jo Cobb	Jennifer Jo Cobb Racing	Chevrolet
12	Spencer Boyd	Young's Motorsports	Chevrolet
14	Trey Hutchens	Trey Hutchens Racing	Chevrolet
15	Tanner Gray	David Gilliland Racing	Ford
16	Tyler Ankrum	Hattori Racing Enterprises	Toyota
17	Ryan Preece	David Gilliland Racing	Ford
18	Chandler Smith	Kyle Busch Motorsports	Toyota
19	Derek Kraus	McAnally–Hilgemann Racing	Chevrolet
20	Stefan Parsons	Young's Motorsports	Chevrolet
22	Max Gutiérrez	AM Racing	Chevrolet
23	Grant Enfinger	GMS Racing	Chevrolet
24	Jack Wood (R)	GMS Racing	Chevrolet
25	Matt DiBenedetto	Rackley W.A.R.	Chevrolet
26	Tate Fogleman	Rackley W.A.R.	Chevrolet
30	Camden Murphy	On Point Motorsports	Toyota
32	Bret Holmes	Bret Holmes Racing	Chevrolet
33	Chris Hacker	Reaume Brothers Racing	Toyota
38	Zane Smith	Front Row Motorsports	Ford
40	Dean Thompson (R)	Niece Motorsports	Chevrolet
42	Carson Hocevar	Niece Motorsports	Chevrolet
43	Nick Leitz	Reaume Brothers Racing	Toyota
44	Kris Wright	Niece Motorsports	Chevrolet
45	Lawless Alan (R)	Niece Motorsports	Chevrolet
46	Chase Janes	G2G Racing	Toyota
47	Kaden Honeycutt	G2G Racing	Toyota
51	Corey Heim (R)	Kyle Busch Motorsports	Toyota
52	Stewart Friesen	Halmar Friesen Racing	Toyota
56	Timmy Hill	Hill Motorsports	Toyota
61	Chase Purdy	Hattori Racing Enterprises	Toyota
62	Todd Bodine	Halmar Friesen Racing	Toyota
66	Ty Majeski	ThorSport Racing	Toyota
75	Parker Kligerman	Henderson Motorsports	Toyota
84	Clay Greenfield	Cook Racing Technologies	Toyota
88	Matt Crafton	ThorSport Racing	Toyota
90	Justin Carroll	Terry Carroll Motorsports	Toyota
91	Colby Howard	McAnally–Hilgemann Racing	Chevrolet
98	Christian Eckes	ThorSport Racing	Toyota
99	Ben Rhodes	ThorSport Racing	Toyota
Official entry list

== Practice ==
The only 30-minute practice session was held on Friday, June 24, at 3:00 PM CST. Stewart Friesen, driving for Halmar Friesen Racing, was the fastest in the session, with a time of 30.689 seconds, and a speed of 156.017 mph (251.085 km/h).

Pos.	#	Driver	Team	Make	Time	Speed
1	52	Stewart Friesen	Halmar Friesen Racing	Toyota	30.689	156.017
2	88	Matt Crafton	ThorSport Racing	Toyota	30.715	155.885
3	66	Ty Majeski	ThorSport Racing	Toyota	30.736	155.778
Full practice results

== Qualifying ==
Qualifying was on Saturday, June 24, at 3:30 PM CST. Since Nashville Superspeedway is an oval track, the qualifying system used is a single-car, one-lap system with only one round. Whoever sets the fastest time in the round wins the pole.

Ryan Preece, driving for David Gilliland Racing, scored the pole for the race, with a time of 29.753 seconds, and a speed of 160.925 mph (258.984 km/h).

Pos.	#	Driver	Team	Make	Time	Speed
1	17	Ryan Preece	David Gilliland Racing	Ford	29.753	160.925
2	38	Zane Smith	Front Row Motorsports	Ford	29.853	160.386
3	42	Carson Hocevar	Niece Motorsports	Chevrolet	29.883	160.225
4	51	Corey Heim (R)	Kyle Busch Motorsports	Toyota	29.982	159.696
5	19	Derek Kraus	McAnally–Hilgemann Racing	Chevrolet	29.982	159.696
6	18	Chandler Smith	Kyle Busch Motorsports	Toyota	29.983	159.690
7	23	Grant Enfinger	GMS Racing	Chevrolet	30.053	159.319
8	25	Matt DiBenedetto	Rackley W.A.R.	Chevrolet	30.140	158.859
9	52	Stewart Friesen	Halmar Friesen Racing	Toyota	30.203	158.527
10	24	Jack Wood (R)	GMS Racing	Chevrolet	30.279	158.129
11	4	John Hunter Nemechek	Kyle Busch Motorsports	Toyota	30.295	158.046
12	98	Christian Eckes	ThorSport Racing	Toyota	30.310	157.968
13	66	Ty Majeski	ThorSport Racing	Toyota	30.310	157.968
14	1	Hailie Deegan	David Gilliland Racing	Ford	30.355	157.733
15	99	Ben Rhodes	ThorSport Racing	Toyota	30.367	157.671
16	16	Tyler Ankrum	Hattori Racing Enterprises	Toyota	30.441	157.288
17	02	Jesse Little	Young's Motorsports	Chevrolet	30.532	156.819
18	88	Matt Crafton	ThorSport Racing	Toyota	30.560	156.675
19	61	Chase Purdy	Hattori Racing Enterprises	Toyota	30.633	156.302
20	44	Kris Wright	Niece Motorsports	Chevrolet	30.731	155.804
21	9	Blaine Perkins (R)	CR7 Motorsports	Chevrolet	30.738	155.768
22	15	Tanner Gray	David Gilliland Racing	Ford	30.789	155.510
23	75	Parker Kligerman	Henderson Motorsports	Toyota	30.794	155.485
24	40	Dean Thompson (R)	Niece Motorsports	Chevrolet	30.827	155.318
25	20	Stefan Parsons (i)	Young's Motorsports	Chevrolet	30.973	154.586
26	56	Timmy Hill	Hill Motorsports	Toyota	31.079	154.059
27	12	Spencer Boyd	Young's Motorsports	Chevrolet	31.114	153.886
28	47	Kaden Honeycutt	G2G Racing	Toyota	31.222	153.353
29	30	Camden Murphy	On Point Motorsports	Toyota	31.222	153.353
30	45	Lawless Alan (R)	Niece Motorsports	Chevrolet	31.264	153.147
31	62	Todd Bodine	Halmar Friesen Racing	Toyota	31.338	152.786
Qualified by owner's points
32	91	Colby Howard	McAnally–Hilgemann Racing	Chevrolet	31.540	151.807
33	43	Nick Leitz	Reaume Brothers Racing	Chevrolet	31.844	150.358
34	33	Chris Hacker	Reaume Brothers Racing	Toyota	32.136	148.992
35	46	Chase Janes	G2G Racing	Toyota	-	-
36	22	Max Gutiérrez (Note: Originally, Max Gutiérrez and Trey Hutchens scored 17th and 29th for qualifying, but their times would be disallowed, due to their trucks being too low to the ground. As a result, Gutiérrez will start from the rear of the field, and Hutchens would fail to qualify. Chase Janes would take the 35th spot over Hutchens.)	AM Racing	Chevrolet	30.444	157.272
Failed to qualify
37	32	Bret Holmes	Bret Holmes Racing	Chevrolet	31.357	152.693
38	90	Justin Carroll	TC Motorsports	Toyota	31.978	149.728
39	10	Jennifer Jo Cobb	Jennifer Jo Cobb Racing	Ford	33.004	145.073
40	84	Clay Greenfield	Cook Racing Technologies	Toyota	33.631	142.369
41	26	Tate Fogleman	Rackley W.A.R.	Chevrolet	-	-
42	14	Trey Hutchens (Note: Originally, Max Gutiérrez and Trey Hutchens scored 17th and 29th for qualifying, but their times would be disallowed, due to their trucks being too low to the ground. As a result, Gutiérrez will start from the rear of the field, and Hutchens would fail to qualify. Chase Janes would take the 35th spot over Hutchens.)	Trey Hutchens Racing	Chevrolet	31.150	153.708
Official qualifying results
Official starting lineup

== Race results ==
Stage 1 Laps: 45

Pos.	#	Driver	Team	Make	Pts
1	38	Zane Smith	Front Row Motorsports	Ford	10
2	17	Ryan Preece	David Gilliland Racing	Ford	9
3	51	Corey Heim (R)	Kyle Busch Motorsports	Toyota	8
4	52	Stewart Friesen	Halmar Friesen Racing	Toyota	7
5	18	Chandler Smith	Kyle Busch Motorsports	Toyota	6
6	42	Carson Hocevar	Niece Motorsports	Chevrolet	5
7	19	Derek Kraus	McAnally–Hilgemann Racing	Chevrolet	4
8	66	Ty Majeski	ThorSport Racing	Toyota	3
9	25	Matt DiBenedetto	Rackley W.A.R.	Chevrolet	2
10	98	Christian Eckes	ThorSport Racing	Toyota	1

Stage 2 Laps: 50

Pos.	#	Driver	Team	Make	Pts
1	17	Ryan Preece	David Gilliland Racing	Ford	10
2	38	Zane Smith	Front Row Motorsports	Ford	9
3	51	Corey Heim (R)	Kyle Busch Motorsports	Toyota	8
4	98	Christian Eckes	ThorSport Racing	Toyota	7
5	52	Stewart Friesen	Halmar Friesen Racing	Toyota	6
6	19	Derek Kraus	McAnally–Hilgemann Racing	Chevrolet	5
7	99	Ben Rhodes	ThorSport Racing	Toyota	4
8	66	Ty Majeski	ThorSport Racing	Toyota	3
9	62	Todd Bodine	Halmar Friesen Racing	Toyota	2
10	23	Grant Enfinger	GMS Racing	Chevrolet	1

Stage 3 Laps: 55

Fin.	St	#	Driver	Team	Make	Laps	Led	Status	Pts
1	1	17	Ryan Preece	David Gilliland Racing	Ford	150	74	Running	59
2	2	38	Zane Smith	Front Row Motorsports	Ford	150	70	Running	54
3	3	42	Carson Hocevar	Niece Motorsports	Chevrolet	150	0	Running	39
4	12	66	Ty Majeski	ThorSport Racing	Toyota	150	4	Running	39
5	9	52	Stewart Friesen	Halmar Friesen Racing	Toyota	150	0	Running	45
6	13	98	Christian Eckes	ThorSport Racing	Toyota	150	0	Running	39
7	16	16	Tyler Ankrum	Hattori Racing Enterprises	Toyota	150	0	Running	30
8	36	22	Max Gutiérrez	AM Racing	Chevrolet	150	0	Running	29
9	11	4	John Hunter Nemechek	Kyle Busch Motorsports	Toyota	150	0	Running	28
10	18	88	Matt Crafton	ThorSport Racing	Toyota	150	0	Running	27
11	5	19	Derek Kraus	McAnally–Hilgemann Racing	Chevrolet	150	0	Running	35
12	15	99	Ben Rhodes	ThorSport Racing	Toyota	150	0	Running	29
13	19	61	Chase Purdy	Hattori Racing Enterprises	Toyota	150	0	Running	24
14	24	40	Dean Thompson (R)	Niece Motorsports	Chevrolet	150	0	Running	23
15	6	18	Chandler Smith	Kyle Busch Motorsports	Toyota	150	0	Running	28
16	32	91	Colby Howard	McAnally–Hilgemann Racing	Chevrolet	150	0	Running	21
17	20	44	Kris Wright	Niece Motorsports	Chevrolet	150	0	Running	20
18	21	9	Blaine Perkins (R)	CR7 Motorsports	Chevrolet	150	0	Running	19
19	17	02	Jesse Little	Young's Motorsports	Chevrolet	150	0	Running	18
20	23	75	Parker Kligerman	Henderson Motorsports	Toyota	150	2	Running	17
21	29	47	Kaden Honeycutt	G2G Racing	Toyota	150	0	Running	16
22	25	20	Stefan Parsons	Young's Motorsports	Chevrolet	150	0	Running	15
23	26	56	Timmy Hill	Hill Motorsports	Toyota	150	0	Running	14
24	30	45	Lawless Alan (R)	Niece Motorsports	Chevrolet	150	0	Running	13
25	27	12	Spencer Boyd	Young's Motorsports	Chevrolet	150	0	Running	12
26	33	43	Nick Leitz	Reaume Brothers Racing	Chevrolet	150	0	Running	11
27	31	62	Todd Bodine	Halmar Friesen Racing	Toyota	148	0	Running	12
28	14	1	Hailie Deegan	David Gilliland Racing	Ford	144	0	Running	9
29	34	33	Chris Hacker	Reaume Brothers Racing	Toyota	144	0	Running	8
30	22	15	Tanner Gray	David Gilliland Racing	Ford	143	0	Running	7
31	8	25	Matt DiBenedetto	Rackley W.A.R.	Chevrolet	132	0	Accident	8
32	7	23	Grant Enfinger	GMS Racing	Chevrolet	126	0	Accident	6
33	4	51	Corey Heim (R)	Kyle Busch Motorsports	Toyota	126	0	Accident	20
34	28	30	Camden Murphy	On Point Motorsports	Toyota	20	0	Accident	3
35	10	24	Jack Wood (R)	GMS Racing	Chevrolet	6	0	Accident	2
36	35	46	Chase Janes	G2G Racing	Toyota	1	0	Rear Gear	1
Official race results

== Standings after the race ==
Drivers' Championship standings

Pos	Driver	Points
1	Zane Smith	530
2	John Hunter Nemechek	509 (-21)
3	Ben Rhodes	500 (-30)
4	Chandler Smith	495 (-35)
5	Stewart Friesen	477 (-53)
6	Ty Majeski	477 (-53)
7	Christian Eckes	447 (-83)
8	Carson Hocevar	425 (-105)
9	Grant Enfinger	389 (-141)
10	Matt Crafton	379 (-151)
Official driver's standings

- Note: Only the first 10 positions are included for the driver standings.

Previous race: 2022 Clean Harbors 150	NASCAR Camping World Truck Series; 2022 season	Next race: 2022 O'Reilly Auto Parts 150 at Mid-Ohio
