= 2020 SpeedyCash.com 400 =

Race details
- Race 21 of 23 of the 2020 NASCAR Gander RV & Outdoors Truck Series
- Date: October 25, 2020
- Official name: SpeedyCash.com 400
- Location: Fort Worth, Texas, Texas Motor Speedway
- Course: Permanent racing facility
- Course length: 1.5 miles (2.41 km)
- Distance: 152 laps, 228 mi (366.929 km)
- Scheduled distance: 147 laps, 220.5 mi (354.9 km)
- Average speed: 106.875 miles per hour (171.999 km/h)

Pole position
| Driver | Sheldon Creed | GMS Racing |
- Grid positions set by competition-based formula

Most laps led
| Driver | Sheldon Creed | GMS Racing |
- Laps: 131

Winner
| No. 2 | Sheldon Creed | GMS Racing |

Television in the United States
- Network: Fox Sports 1
- Announcers: Vince Welch, Michael Waltrip, and Jamie McMurray

Radio in the United States
- Radio: Motor Racing Network

The 2020 SpeedyCash.com 400 was the 21st stock car race of the 2020 NASCAR Gander RV & Outdoors Truck Series season, the 24th iteration of the event, and the second race of the Round of 8. The race was originally going to be held on June 5, 2020, but was postponed to Sunday, October 25, 2020, due to the COVID-19 pandemic. The race was held in Fort Worth, Texas at Texas Motor Speedway, a 1.5 miles (2.4 km) permanent quad-oval racetrack. The race was extended from its scheduled 147 laps to 152 laps due to a late race wreck caused by Ben Rhodes turning Christian Eckes; much to the dismay of Eckes, Eckes would give Rhodes a double middle finger the next time Rhodes went by his car. At race's end, Sheldon Creed of GMS Racing would dominate and win the race, the 4th of the season and NASCAR Gander RV & Outdoors Truck Series career win. To fill out the podium, Austin Hill of Hattori Racing Enterprises and Zane Smith of GMS Racing would finish 2nd and 3rd, respectively.

== Background ==
The layout of Texas Motor Speedway, the venue where the race was held.

Texas Motor Speedway is a speedway located in the northernmost portion of the U.S. city of Fort Worth, Texas – the portion located in Denton County, Texas. The track measures 1.5 miles (2.4 km) around and is banked 24 degrees in the turns, and is of the oval design, where the front straightaway juts outward slightly. The track layout is similar to Atlanta Motor Speedway and Charlotte Motor Speedway (formerly Lowe's Motor Speedway). The track is owned by Speedway Motorsports, Inc., the same company that owns Atlanta and Charlotte Motor Speedway, as well as the short-track Bristol Motor Speedway.

=== Entry list ===
| # | Driver | Team | Make |
|---|---|---|---|
| 00 | Josh Bilicki | Reaume Brothers Racing | Toyota |
| 2 | Sheldon Creed | GMS Racing | Chevrolet |
| 02 | Tate Fogleman | Young's Motorsports | Chevrolet |
| 3 | Jordan Anderson | Jordan Anderson Racing | Chevrolet |
| 4 | Raphaël Lessard | Kyle Busch Motorsports | Toyota |
| 6 | Norm Benning | Norm Benning Racing | Chevrolet |
| 10 | Jennifer Jo Cobb | Jennifer Jo Cobb Racing | Chevrolet |
| 13 | Johnny Sauter | ThorSport Racing | Ford |
| 14 | Trey Hutchens | Trey Hutchens Racing | Chevrolet |
| 15 | Tanner Gray | DGR-Crosley | Ford |
| 16 | Austin Hill | Hattori Racing Enterprises | Toyota |
| 17 | Dylan Lupton | DGR-Crosley | Ford |
| 18 | Christian Eckes | Kyle Busch Motorsports | Toyota |
| 19 | Derek Kraus | McAnally–Hilgemann Racing | Toyota |
| 20 | Spencer Boyd | Young's Motorsports | Chevrolet |
| 21 | Zane Smith | GMS Racing | Chevrolet |
| 22 | Austin Wayne Self | AM Racing | Chevrolet |
| 23 | Brett Moffitt | GMS Racing | Chevrolet |
| 24 | Chase Purdy | GMS Racing | Chevrolet |
| 26 | Tyler Ankrum | GMS Racing | Chevrolet |
| 30 | Danny Bohn | On Point Motorsports | Toyota |
| 33 | Josh Reaume | Reaume Brothers Racing | Toyota |
| 38 | Todd Gilliland | Front Row Motorsports | Ford |
| 40 | Ryan Truex | Niece Motorsports | Chevrolet |
| 41 | Dawson Cram | Cram Racing Enterprises | Chevrolet |
| 42 | James Buescher | Niece Motorsports | Chevrolet |
| 44 | Natalie Decker | Niece Motorsports | Chevrolet |
| 45 | Trevor Bayne | Niece Motorsports | Chevrolet |
| 49 | Tim Viens | CMI Motorsports | Chevrolet |
| 51 | Chandler Smith | Kyle Busch Motorsports | Toyota |
| 52 | Stewart Friesen | Halmar Friesen Racing | Toyota |
| 56 | Tyler Hill | Hill Motorsports | Chevrolet |
| 68 | Clay Greenfield | Clay Greenfield Motorsports | Toyota |
| 83 | Ray Ciccarelli | CMI Motorsports | Chevrolet |
| 88 | Matt Crafton | ThorSport Racing | Ford |
| 98 | Grant Enfinger | ThorSport Racing | Ford |
| 99 | Ben Rhodes | ThorSport Racing | Ford |
Official entry list

== Starting lineup ==
The starting lineup was selected based on the results and fastest lap of the last race, the 2020 Clean Harbors 200. As a result, Sheldon Creed of GMS Racing won the pole.

| Pos. | # | Driver | Team | Make |
|---|---|---|---|---|
| 1 | 2 | Sheldon Creed | GMS Racing | Chevrolet |
| 2 | 23 | Brett Moffitt | GMS Racing | Chevrolet |
| 3 | 16 | Austin Hill | Hattori Racing Enterprises | Toyota |
| 4 | 98 | Grant Enfinger | ThorSport Racing | Ford |
| 5 | 51 | Chandler Smith | Kyle Busch Motorsports | Toyota |
| 6 | 21 | Zane Smith | GMS Racing | Chevrolet |
| 7 | 88 | Matt Crafton | ThorSport Racing | Ford |
| 8 | 99 | Ben Rhodes | ThorSport Racing | Ford |
| 9 | 26 | Tyler Ankrum | GMS Racing | Chevrolet |
| 10 | 18 | Christian Eckes | Kyle Busch Motorsports | Toyota |
| 11 | 19 | Derek Kraus | McAnally–Hilgemann Racing | Toyota |
| 12 | 38 | Todd Gilliland | Front Row Motorsports | Ford |
| 13 | 45 | Trevor Bayne | Niece Motorsports | Chevrolet |
| 14 | 40 | Ryan Truex | Niece Motorsports | Chevrolet |
| 15 | 13 | Johnny Sauter | ThorSport Racing | Ford |
| 16 | 56 | Tyler Hill | Hill Motorsports | Chevrolet |
| 17 | 02 | Tate Fogleman | Young's Motorsports | Chevrolet |
| 18 | 22 | Austin Wayne Self | AM Racing | Chevrolet |
| 19 | 30 | Danny Bohn | On Point Motorsports | Toyota |
| 20 | 4 | Raphaël Lessard | Kyle Busch Motorsports | Toyota |
| 21 | 52 | Stewart Friesen | Halmar Friesen Racing | Toyota |
| 22 | 20 | Spencer Boyd | Young's Motorsports | Chevrolet |
| 23 | 15 | Tanner Gray | DGR-Crosley | Ford |
| 24 | 68 | Clay Greenfield | Clay Greenfield Motorsports | Toyota |
| 25 | 3 | Jordan Anderson | Jordan Anderson Racing | Chevrolet |
| 26 | 41 | Dawson Cram | Cram Racing Enterprises | Chevrolet |
| 27 | 44 | Natalie Decker | Niece Motorsports | Chevrolet |
| 28 | 24 | Chase Purdy | GMS Racing | Chevrolet |
| 29 | 17 | Dylan Lupton | DGR-Crosley | Ford |
| 30 | 83 | Ray Ciccarelli | CMI Motorsports | Chevrolet |
| 31 | 10 | Jennifer Jo Cobb | Jennifer Jo Cobb Racing | Chevrolet |
| 32 | 00 | Josh Bilicki | Reaume Brothers Racing | Toyota |
| 33 | 49 | Tim Viens | CMI Motorsports | Chevrolet |
| 34 | 33 | Josh Reaume | Reaume Brothers Racing | Toyota |
| 35 | 6 | Norm Benning | Norm Benning Racing | Chevrolet |
| 36 | 42 | James Buescher | Niece Motorsports | Chevrolet |
| 37 | 14 | Trey Hutchens | Trey Hutchens Racing | Chevrolet |
Official starting lineup

== Race results ==
Stage 1 Laps: 35

| Fin | # | Driver | Team | Make | Pts |
|---|---|---|---|---|---|
| 1 | 2 | Sheldon Creed | GMS Racing | Chevrolet | 10 |
| 2 | 16 | Austin Hill | Hattori Racing Enterprises | Toyota | 9 |
| 3 | 23 | Brett Moffitt | GMS Racing | Chevrolet | 8 |
| 4 | 99 | Ben Rhodes | ThorSport Racing | Ford | 7 |
| 5 | 88 | Matt Crafton | ThorSport Racing | Ford | 6 |
| 6 | 51 | Chandler Smith | Kyle Busch Motorsports | Toyota | 5 |
| 7 | 18 | Christian Eckes | Kyle Busch Motorsports | Toyota | 4 |
| 8 | 21 | Zane Smith | GMS Racing | Chevrolet | 3 |
| 9 | 98 | Grant Enfinger | ThorSport Racing | Ford | 2 |
| 10 | 38 | Todd Gilliland | Front Row Motorsports | Ford | 1 |

Stage 2 Laps: 35

| Fin | # | Driver | Team | Make | Pts |
|---|---|---|---|---|---|
| 1 | 88 | Matt Crafton | ThorSport Racing | Ford | 10 |
| 2 | 2 | Sheldon Creed | GMS Racing | Chevrolet | 9 |
| 3 | 99 | Ben Rhodes | ThorSport Racing | Ford | 8 |
| 4 | 21 | Zane Smith | GMS Racing | Chevrolet | 7 |
| 5 | 19 | Derek Kraus | McAnally–Hilgemann Racing | Toyota | 6 |
| 6 | 51 | Chandler Smith | Kyle Busch Motorsports | Toyota | 5 |
| 7 | 18 | Christian Eckes | Kyle Busch Motorsports | Toyota | 4 |
| 8 | 16 | Austin Hill | Hattori Racing Enterprises | Toyota | 3 |
| 9 | 98 | Grant Enfinger | ThorSport Racing | Ford | 2 |
| 10 | 23 | Brett Moffitt | GMS Racing | Chevrolet | 1 |

Stage 3 Laps: 82

| Fin | St | # | Driver | Team | Make | Laps | Led | Status | Pts |
|---|---|---|---|---|---|---|---|---|---|
| 1 | 1 | 2 | Sheldon Creed | GMS Racing | Chevrolet | 152 | 131 | running | 59 |
| 2 | 3 | 16 | Austin Hill | Hattori Racing Enterprises | Toyota | 152 | 1 | running | 47 |
| 3 | 6 | 21 | Zane Smith | GMS Racing | Chevrolet | 152 | 0 | running | 44 |
| 4 | 20 | 4 | Raphaël Lessard | Kyle Busch Motorsports | Toyota | 152 | 0 | running | 33 |
| 5 | 2 | 23 | Brett Moffitt | GMS Racing | Chevrolet | 152 | 0 | running | 41 |
| 6 | 7 | 88 | Matt Crafton | ThorSport Racing | Ford | 152 | 13 | running | 47 |
| 7 | 18 | 22 | Austin Wayne Self | AM Racing | Chevrolet | 152 | 0 | running | 30 |
| 8 | 29 | 17 | Dylan Lupton | DGR-Crosley | Ford | 152 | 0 | running | 29 |
| 9 | 11 | 19 | Derek Kraus | McAnally–Hilgemann Racing | Toyota | 152 | 2 | running | 34 |
| 10 | 23 | 15 | Tanner Gray | DGR-Crosley | Ford | 152 | 0 | running | 27 |
| 11 | 16 | 56 | Tyler Hill | Hill Motorsports | Chevrolet | 152 | 0 | running | 26 |
| 12 | 28 | 24 | Chase Purdy | GMS Racing | Chevrolet | 152 | 0 | running | 25 |
| 13 | 25 | 3 | Jordan Anderson | Jordan Anderson Racing | Chevrolet | 152 | 0 | running | 24 |
| 14 | 22 | 20 | Spencer Boyd | Young's Motorsports | Chevrolet | 152 | 0 | running | 23 |
| 15 | 36 | 42 | James Buescher | Niece Motorsports | Chevrolet | 152 | 0 | running | 22 |
| 16 | 9 | 26 | Tyler Ankrum | GMS Racing | Chevrolet | 152 | 0 | running | 21 |
| 17 | 19 | 30 | Danny Bohn | On Point Motorsports | Toyota | 152 | 0 | running | 20 |
| 18 | 26 | 41 | Dawson Cram | Cram Racing Enterprises | Chevrolet | 152 | 0 | running | 19 |
| 19 | 32 | 00 | Josh Bilicki | Reaume Brothers Racing | Toyota | 151 | 0 | crash | 0 |
| 20 | 8 | 99 | Ben Rhodes | ThorSport Racing | Ford | 151 | 1 | running | 32 |
| 21 | 5 | 51 | Chandler Smith | Kyle Busch Motorsports | Toyota | 151 | 0 | running | 26 |
| 22 | 30 | 83 | Ray Ciccarelli | CMI Motorsports | Chevrolet | 151 | 0 | running | 15 |
| 23 | 15 | 13 | Johnny Sauter | ThorSport Racing | Ford | 150 | 0 | running | 14 |
| 24 | 31 | 10 | Jennifer Jo Cobb | Jennifer Jo Cobb Racing | Chevrolet | 149 | 0 | running | 13 |
| 25 | 10 | 18 | Christian Eckes | Kyle Busch Motorsports | Toyota | 145 | 0 | crash | 20 |
| 26 | 35 | 6 | Norm Benning | Norm Benning Racing | Chevrolet | 143 | 0 | running | 11 |
| 27 | 34 | 33 | Josh Reaume | Reaume Brothers Racing | Toyota | 131 | 0 | brakes | 10 |
| 28 | 21 | 52 | Stewart Friesen | Halmar Friesen Racing | Toyota | 129 | 4 | crash | 9 |
| 29 | 13 | 45 | Trevor Bayne | Niece Motorsports | Chevrolet | 118 | 0 | engine | 8 |
| 30 | 27 | 44 | Natalie Decker | Niece Motorsports | Chevrolet | 115 | 0 | vibration | 7 |
| 31 | 12 | 38 | Todd Gilliland | Front Row Motorsports | Ford | 105 | 0 | crash | 7 |
| 32 | 4 | 98 | Grant Enfinger | ThorSport Racing | Ford | 91 | 0 | engine | 9 |
| 33 | 17 | 02 | Tate Fogleman | Young's Motorsports | Chevrolet | 51 | 0 | crash | 5 |
| 34 | 14 | 40 | Ryan Truex | Niece Motorsports | Chevrolet | 49 | 0 | suspension | 5 |
| 35 | 24 | 68 | Clay Greenfield | Clay Greenfield Motorsports | Toyota | 42 | 0 | crash | 5 |
| 36 | 37 | 14 | Trey Hutchens | Trey Hutchens Racing | Chevrolet | 36 | 0 | ignition | 5 |
| 37 | 33 | 49 | Tim Viens | CMI Motorsports | Chevrolet | 29 | 0 | crash | 5 |
Official race results

| Previous race: 2020 Clean Harbors 200 | NASCAR Gander RV & Outdoors Truck Series; 2020 season | Next race: 2020 NASCAR Hall of Fame 200 |
