= 2023 Worldwide Express 250 =

16th race of the 2023 NASCAR Craftsman Truck Series

2023 Worldwide Express 250 for Carrier Appreciation
Race details
- Race 16 of 23 of the 2023 NASCAR Craftsman Truck Series
- Date: July 29, 2023
- Official name: 4th Annual Worldwide Express 250
- Location: Richmond Raceway, Richmond, Virginia
- Course: Permanent racing facility
- Course length: 0.750 miles (1.207 km)
- Distance: 250 laps, 187 mi (301 km)
- Scheduled distance: 250 laps, 187 mi (301 km)
- Average speed: 94.116 mph (151.465 km/h)

Pole position
Driver	Ty Majeski	ThorSport Racing
- Time: 22.689

Most laps led
Driver	Ty Majeski	ThorSport Racing
- Laps: 168

Winner
No. 42	Carson Hocevar	Niece Motorsports

Television in the United States
- Network: FS1
- Announcers: Adam Alexander, Phil Parsons, and Michael Waltrip

Radio in the United States
- Radio: MRN

The 2023 Worldwide Express 250 for Carrier Appreciation was the 16th stock car race of the 2023 NASCAR Craftsman Truck Series, the final race of the regular season, and the 4th iteration of the event. The race was held on Saturday, July 29, 2023, in Richmond, Virginia at Richmond Raceway, a 0.750 miles (1.207 km) permanent quad-oval shaped racetrack. The race took the scheduled 250 laps to complete. Carson Hocevar, driving for Niece Motorsports, would make a late-race pass for the lead on Ty Majeski with under five laps to go, and held on to earn his third career NASCAR Craftsman Truck Series win. Majeski would dominate the entire race, starting from the pole, winning both stages, and eventually came back from an early pit road speeding penalty. Majeski's pit road strategy to stay out for the remainder of the final stage would be unsuccessful, as Hocevar would take advantage in the final laps. To fill out the podium, Majeski, driving for ThorSport Racing, and Zane Smith, driving for Front Row Motorsports, would finish 2nd and 3rd, respectively.

The ten drivers that would qualify for the NASCAR playoffs are Corey Heim, Zane Smith, Carson Hocevar, Christian Eckes, Grant Enfinger, Ty Majeski, Ben Rhodes, Nick Sanchez, Matt DiBenedetto, and Matt Crafton. Heim would also claim the Regular Season Championship during the race.

== Background ==
Richmond Raceway (RR), formerly known as Richmond International Raceway (RIR), is a 3/4-mile (1.2 km), D-shaped, asphalt race track located just outside Richmond, Virginia, in Henrico County. It hosts the NASCAR Cup Series, the NASCAR Xfinity Series, NASCAR Craftsman Truck Series and the IndyCar series. Known as "America's premier short track", it formerly hosted two USAC sprint car races.

=== Entry list ===
- (R) denotes rookie driver.
- (i) denotes driver who is ineligible for series driver points.

#	Driver	Team	Make
1	William Sawalich	Tricon Garage	Toyota
02	Will Rodgers	Young's Motorsports	Chevrolet
2	Nick Sanchez (R)	Rev Racing	Chevrolet
4	Chase Purdy	Kyle Busch Motorsports	Chevrolet
5	Dean Thompson	Tricon Garage	Toyota
9	Colby Howard	CR7 Motorsports	Chevrolet
11	Corey Heim	Tricon Garage	Toyota
12	Spencer Boyd	Young's Motorsports	Chevrolet
13	Hailie Deegan	ThorSport Racing	Ford
14	Trey Hutchens	Trey Hutchens Racing	Chevrolet
15	Tanner Gray	Tricon Garage	Toyota
16	Tyler Ankrum	Hattori Racing Enterprises	Toyota
17	Taylor Gray (R)	Tricon Garage	Toyota
19	Christian Eckes	McAnally-Hilgemann Racing	Chevrolet
20	Mason Massey (i)	Young's Motorsports	Chevrolet
22	Christian Rose	AM Racing	Ford
23	Grant Enfinger	GMS Racing	Chevrolet
24	Rajah Caruth (R)	GMS Racing	Chevrolet
25	Matt DiBenedetto	Rackley WAR	Chevrolet
30	Ryan Vargas	On Point Motorsports	Toyota
32	Bret Holmes (R)	Bret Holmes Racing	Chevrolet
33	Derek Lemke	Reaume Brothers Racing	Ford
34	Josh Reaume	Reaume Brothers Racing	Ford
35	Jake Garcia (R)	McAnally-Hilgemann Racing	Chevrolet
38	Zane Smith	Front Row Motorsports	Ford
41	Bayley Currey	Niece Motorsports	Chevrolet
42	Carson Hocevar	Niece Motorsports	Chevrolet
43	Daniel Dye (R)	GMS Racing	Chevrolet
45	Lawless Alan	Niece Motorsports	Chevrolet
46	Memphis Villarreal	G2G Racing	Toyota
51	Matt Mills	Kyle Busch Motorsports	Chevrolet
52	Stewart Friesen	Halmar Friesen Racing	Toyota
56	Timmy Hill	Hill Motorsports	Toyota
66	Conner Jones	ThorSport Racing	Ford
88	Matt Crafton	ThorSport Racing	Ford
90	Justin Carroll	TC Motorsports	Toyota
98	Ty Majeski	ThorSport Racing	Ford
99	Ben Rhodes	ThorSport Racing	Ford
Official entry list

== Practice ==
The first and only practice session was held on Friday, July 28, at 5:05 PM EST, and would last for 20 minutes. Ty Majeski, driving for ThorSport Racing, would set the fastest time in the session, with a lap of 22.813, and an average speed of 118.354 mph (190.472 km/h).

Pos.	#	Driver	Team	Make	Time	Speed
1	98	Ty Majeski	ThorSport Racing	Ford	22.813	118.354
2	88	Matt Crafton	ThorSport Racing	Ford	22.844	118.193
3	19	Christian Eckes	McAnally-Hilgemann Racing	Chevrolet	22.995	117.417
Full practice results

== Qualifying ==
Qualifying was held on Friday, July 28, at 5:35 PM EST. Since Richmond Raceway is a short track, the qualifying system used is a single-car, two-lap system with only one round. In that round, whoever sets the fastest time will win the pole. Ty Majeski, driving for ThorSport Racing, would score the pole for the race, with a lap of 22.689, and an average speed of 119.000 mph (191.512 km/h).

Pos.	#	Driver	Team	Make	Time	Speed
1	98	Ty Majeski	ThorSport Racing	Ford	22.689	119.000
2	11	Corey Heim	Tricon Garage	Toyota	22.741	118.728
3	1	William Sawalich	Tricon Garage	Toyota	22.839	118.219
4	99	Ben Rhodes	ThorSport Racing	Ford	22.842	118.203
5	51	Matt Mills	Kyle Busch Motorsports	Chevrolet	22.872	118.048
6	19	Christian Eckes	McAnally-Hilgemann Racing	Chevrolet	22.887	117.971
7	15	Tanner Gray	Tricon Garage	Toyota	22.896	117.925
8	88	Matt Crafton	ThorSport Racing	Ford	22.952	117.637
9	4	Chase Purdy	Kyle Busch Motorsports	Chevrolet	22.975	117.519
10	25	Matt DiBenedetto	Rackley WAR	Chevrolet	22.998	117.402
11	41	Bayley Currey	Niece Motorsports	Chevrolet	23.004	117.371
12	35	Jake Garcia (R)	McAnally-Hilgemann Racing	Chevrolet	23.015	117.315
13	23	Grant Enfinger	GMS Racing	Chevrolet	23.062	117.076
14	2	Nick Sanchez (R)	Rev Racing	Chevrolet	23.070	117.035
15	38	Zane Smith	Front Row Motorsports	Ford	23.120	116.782
16	24	Rajah Caruth (R)	GMS Racing	Chevrolet	23.136	116.701
17	42	Carson Hocevar	Niece Motorsports	Chevrolet	23.144	116.661
18	43	Daniel Dye (R)	GMS Racing	Chevrolet	23.144	116.661
19	17	Taylor Gray (R)	Tricon Garage	Toyota	23.150	116.631
20	5	Dean Thompson	Tricon Garage	Toyota	23.199	116.384
21	16	Tyler Ankrum	Hattori Racing Enterprises	Toyota	23.217	116.294
22	45	Lawless Alan	Niece Motorsports	Chevrolet	23.283	115.964
23	52	Stewart Friesen	Halmar Friesen Racing	Toyota	23.297	115.895
24	66	Conner Jones	ThorSport Racing	Ford	23.351	115.627
25	13	Hailie Deegan	ThorSport Racing	Ford	23.368	115.543
26	32	Bret Holmes (R)	Bret Holmes Racing	Chevrolet	23.370	115.533
27	9	Colby Howard	CR7 Motorsports	Chevrolet	23.402	115.375
28	30	Ryan Vargas	On Point Motorsports	Toyota	23.597	114.421
29	02	Will Rodgers	Young's Motorsports	Chevrolet	23.600	114.407
30	56	Timmy Hill	Hill Motorsports	Toyota	23.620	114.310
31	33	Derek Lemke	Reaume Brothers Racing	Ford	23.708	113.886
Qualified by owner's points
32	12	Spencer Boyd	Young's Motorsports	Chevrolet	23.797	113.460
33	20	Mason Massey (i)	Young's Motorsports	Chevrolet	23.897	112.985
34	90	Justin Carroll	TC Motorsports	Toyota	23.905	112.947
35	22	Christian Rose	AM Racing	Ford	23.908	112.933
36	34	Josh Reaume	Reaume Brothers Racing	Ford	24.034	112.341
Failed to qualify
37	14	Trey Hutchens	Trey Hutchens Racing	Chevrolet	24.106	112.005
38	46	Memphis Villarreal	G2G Racing	Toyota	24.828	108.748
Official qualifying results
Official starting lineup

== Race results ==
Stage 1 Laps: 70

Pos.	#	Driver	Team	Make	Pts
1	98	Ty Majeski	ThorSport Racing	Ford	10
2	99	Ben Rhodes	ThorSport Racing	Ford	9
3	11	Corey Heim	Tricon Garage	Toyota	8
4	19	Christian Eckes	McAnally-Hilgemann Racing	Chevrolet	7
5	88	Matt Crafton	ThorSport Racing	Ford	6
6	1	William Sawalich	Tricon Garage	Toyota	5
7	35	Jake Garcia (R)	McAnally-Hilgemann Racing	Chevrolet	4
8	4	Chase Purdy	Kyle Busch Motorsports	Chevrolet	3
9	51	Matt Mills	Kyle Busch Motorsports	Chevrolet	2
10	25	Matt DiBenedetto	Rackley WAR	Chevrolet	1

Stage 2 Laps: 70

Pos.	#	Driver	Team	Make	Pts
1	98	Ty Majeski	ThorSport Racing	Ford	10
2	99	Ben Rhodes	ThorSport Racing	Ford	9
3	11	Corey Heim	Tricon Garage	Toyota	8
4	19	Christian Eckes	McAnally-Hilgemann Racing	Chevrolet	7
5	42	Carson Hocevar	Niece Motorsports	Chevrolet	6
6	35	Jake Garcia (R)	McAnally-Hilgemann Racing	Chevrolet	5
7	88	Matt Crafton	ThorSport Racing	Ford	4
8	1	William Sawalich	Tricon Garage	Toyota	3
9	2	Nick Sanchez (R)	Rev Racing	Chevrolet	2
10	51	Matt Mills	Kyle Busch Motorsports	Chevrolet	1

Stage 3 Laps: 110

Fin	St	#	Driver	Team	Make	Laps	Led	Status	Pts
1	17	42	Carson Hocevar	Niece Motorsports	Chevrolet	250	64	Running	48
2	1	98	Ty Majeski	ThorSport Racing	Ford	250	168	Running	55
3	15	38	Zane Smith	Front Row Motorsports	Ford	250	0	Running	34
4	12	35	Jake Garcia (R)	McAnally-Hilgemann Racing	Chevrolet	250	0	Running	42
5	5	51	Matt Mills	Kyle Busch Motorsports	Chevrolet	250	0	Running	35
6	2	11	Corey Heim	Tricon Garage	Toyota	250	9	Running	47
7	8	88	Matt Crafton	ThorSport Racing	Ford	250	0	Running	40
8	14	2	Nick Sanchez (R)	Rev Racing	Chevrolet	249	0	Running	31
9	13	23	Grant Enfinger	GMS Racing	Chevrolet	249	0	Running	28
10	3	1	William Sawalich	Tricon Garage	Toyota	249	0	Running	35
11	6	19	Christian Eckes	McAnally-Hilgemann Racing	Chevrolet	249	0	Running	40
12	4	99	Ben Rhodes	ThorSport Racing	Ford	249	9	Running	43
13	21	16	Tyler Ankrum	Hattori Racing Enterprises	Toyota	249	0	Running	24
14	19	17	Taylor Gray (R)	Tricon Garage	Toyota	249	0	Running	23
15	25	13	Hailie Deegan	ThorSport Racing	Ford	249	0	Running	22
16	7	15	Tanner Gray	Tricon Garage	Toyota	249	0	Running	21
17	10	25	Matt DiBenedetto	Rackley WAR	Chevrolet	249	0	Running	21
18	11	41	Bayley Currey	Niece Motorsports	Chevrolet	248	0	Running	19
19	16	24	Rajah Caruth (R)	GMS Racing	Chevrolet	248	0	Running	18
20	24	66	Conner Jones	ThorSport Racing	Ford	248	0	Running	17
21	18	43	Daniel Dye (R)	GMS Racing	Chevrolet	248	0	Running	16
22	9	4	Chase Purdy	Kyle Busch Motorsports	Chevrolet	248	0	Running	18
23	30	56	Timmy Hill	Hill Motorsports	Toyota	248	0	Running	14
24	27	9	Colby Howard	CR7 Motorsports	Chevrolet	247	0	Running	13
25	20	5	Dean Thompson	Tricon Garage	Toyota	247	0	Running	12
26	29	02	Will Rodgers	Young's Motorsports	Chevrolet	247	0	Running	11
27	23	52	Stewart Friesen	Halmar Friesen Racing	Toyota	247	0	Running	10
28	22	45	Lawless Alan	Niece Motorsports	Chevrolet	247	0	Running	9
29	26	32	Bret Holmes (R)	Bret Holmes Racing	Chevrolet	247	0	Running	8
30	28	30	Ryan Vargas	On Point Motorsports	Toyota	246	0	Running	7
31	34	90	Justin Carroll	TC Motorsports	Toyota	245	0	Running	6
32	35	22	Christian Rose	AM Racing	Ford	244	0	Running	5
33	31	33	Derek Lemke	Reaume Brothers Racing	Ford	243	0	Running	4
34	33	20	Mason Massey (i)	Young's Motorsports	Chevrolet	242	0	Running	0
35	32	12	Spencer Boyd	Young's Motorsports	Chevrolet	240	0	Running	2
36	36	34	Josh Reaume	Reaume Brothers Racing	Ford	239	0	Running	1
Official race results

== Standings after the race ==
Drivers' Championship standings

	Pos	Driver	Points
	1	Corey Heim	2,030
	2	Zane Smith	2,022 (-8)
4	3	Carson Hocevar	2,021 (-9)
2	4	Christian Eckes	2,019 (-11)
2	5	Grant Enfinger	2,017 (-13)
1	6	Ty Majeski	2,014 (-16)
3	7	Ben Rhodes	2,013 (-17)
1	8	Nick Sanchez	2,005 (-25)
1	9	Matt DiBenedetto	2,002 (-28)
	10	Matt Crafton	2,002 (-28)
Official driver's standings

- Note: Only the first 10 positions are included for the driver standings.

Previous race: 2023 CRC Brakleen 150	NASCAR Craftsman Truck Series; 2023 season	Next race: 2023 TSport 200
