= 2022 Heart of America 200 =

Eighth race of the 2022 NASCAR Camping World Truck Series

Race details
- Race 8 of 23 of the 2022 NASCAR Camping World Truck Series
- Date: May 14, 2022
- Official name: 24th Annual Heart of America 200
- Location: Kansas City, Kansas, Kansas Speedway
- Course: Permanent racing facility
- Course length: 1.5 miles (2.4 km)
- Distance: 134 laps, 250.5 mi (403.1 km)
- Average speed: 127.709 mph (205.528 km/h)

Pole position
Driver	John Hunter Nemechek	Kyle Busch Motorsports
- Time: 30.570

Most laps led
Driver	Zane Smith	Front Row Motorsports
- Laps: 108

Winner
No. 38	Zane Smith	Front Row Motorsports

Television in the United States
- Network: Fox Sports 1
- Announcers: Vince Welch, Kurt Busch, Michael Waltrip

Radio in the United States
- Radio: Motor Racing Network

The 2022 Heart of America 200 was the eighth stock car race of the 2022 NASCAR Camping World Truck Series and the 24th iteration of the event. The race was held on Saturday, May 14, 2022, in Kansas City, Kansas at Kansas Speedway, a 1.5 miles (2.4 km) permanent D-shaped oval racetrack. The race was contested over 134 laps. Zane Smith, driving for Front Row Motorsports, would have a dominant performance, leading 108 laps and earning his sixth career truck series win. It was his third win of the season. To fill out the podium, Ty Majeski of ThorSport Racing and Grant Enfinger of GMS Racing would finish 2nd and 3rd, respectively.

== Background ==
Kansas Speedway is a 1.5-mile (2.4 km) tri-oval race track in Kansas City, Kansas, United States. It was built in 2001 and it currently hosts two annual NASCAR race weekends. The IndyCar Series also held races at the venue until 2011. The speedway is owned and operated by NASCAR.

=== Entry list ===
- (R) denotes rookie driver.
- (i) denotes driver who are ineligible for series driver points.

#	Driver	Team	Make
1	Hailie Deegan	David Gilliland Racing	Ford
02	Jesse Little	Young's Motorsports	Chevrolet
4	John Hunter Nemechek	Kyle Busch Motorsports	Toyota
5	Tyler Hill	Hill Motorsports	Toyota
9	Blaine Perkins (R)	CR7 Motorsports	Chevrolet
12	Spencer Boyd	Young's Motorsports	Chevrolet
14	Trey Hutchens	Trey Hutchens Racing	Chevrolet
15	Tanner Gray	David Gilliland Racing	Ford
16	Tyler Ankrum	Hattori Racing Enterprises	Toyota
17	Riley Herbst (i)	David Gilliland Racing	Ford
18	Chandler Smith	Kyle Busch Motorsports	Toyota
19	Derek Kraus	McAnally–Hilgemann Racing	Chevrolet
20	Matt Mills (i)	Young's Motorsports	Chevrolet
22	Austin Wayne Self	AM Racing	Chevrolet
23	Grant Enfinger	GMS Racing	Chevrolet
24	Jack Wood (R)	GMS Racing	Chevrolet
25	Matt DiBenedetto	Rackley W.A.R.	Chevrolet
30	Tate Fogleman	On Point Motorsports	Toyota
33	Josh Reaume	Reaume Brothers Racing	Toyota
38	Zane Smith	Front Row Motorsports	Ford
40	Dean Thompson (R)	Niece Motorsports	Chevrolet
42	Carson Hocevar	Niece Motorsports	Chevrolet
43	Jesse Iwuji (i)	Reaume Brothers Racing	Chevrolet
44	Kris Wright	Niece Motorsports	Chevrolet
45	Lawless Alan (R)	Niece Motorsports	Chevrolet
46	Ryan Huff	G2G Racing	Toyota
51	Corey Heim (R)	Kyle Busch Motorsports	Toyota
52	Stewart Friesen (Note: Due to flight cancellations, Bubba Wallace will pilot Friesen's No. 52 truck for practice and qualifying. Friesen however, made it to the race on time.)	Halmar Friesen Racing	Toyota
56	Timmy Hill	Hill Motorsports	Toyota
61	Chase Purdy	Hattori Racing Enterprises	Toyota
66	Ty Majeski	ThorSport Racing	Toyota
88	Matt Crafton	ThorSport Racing	Toyota
91	Colby Howard	McAnally–Hilgemann Racing	Chevrolet
98	Christian Eckes	ThorSport Racing	Toyota
99	Ben Rhodes	ThorSport Racing	Toyota
Official entry list

== Practice ==
The only 30-minute practice session was held on Saturday, May 14, at 11:00 AM CST. Zane Smith of Front Row Motorsports was the fastest in the session, with a time of 30.960 seconds and a speed of 174.419 mph (280.700 km/h).

Pos.	#	Driver	Team	Make	Time	Speed
1	38	Zane Smith	Front Row Motorsports	Ford	30.960	174.419
2	66	Ty Majeski	ThorSport Racing	Toyota	31.213	173.005
3	88	Matt Crafton	ThorSport Racing	Toyota	31.322	172.403
Full practice results

== Qualifying ==
Qualifying was held on Saturday, May 14, at 11:30 AM CST. Since Kansas Speedway is an oval track, the qualifying system used is a single-car, one-lap system with only one round. Whoever sets the fastest time in the round wins the pole.

John Hunter Nemechek of Kyle Busch Motorsports scored the pole for the race, with a time of 30.570 seconds and a speed of 176.644 mph (284.281 km/h). Since 35 trucks are entered, no one would fail to qualify.

Pos.	#	Driver	Team	Make	Time	Speed
1	4	John Hunter Nemechek	Kyle Busch Motorsports	Toyota	30.570	176.644
2	51	Corey Heim (R)	Kyle Busch Motorsports	Toyota	30.688	175.965
3	66	Ty Majeski	ThorSport Racing	Toyota	30.825	175.182
4	38	Zane Smith	Front Row Motorsports	Ford	30.828	175.165
5	52	Bubba Wallace (i)	Halmar Friesen Racing	Toyota	30.866	174.950
6	18	Chandler Smith	Kyle Busch Motorsports	Toyota	30.884	174.848
7	17	Riley Herbst (i)	David Gilliland Racing	Ford	30.915	174.672
8	19	Derek Kraus	McAnally–Hilgemann Racing	Chevrolet	30.980	174.306
9	15	Tanner Gray	David Gilliland Racing	Ford	31.068	173.812
10	91	Colby Howard	McAnally–Hilgemann Racing	Chevrolet	31.147	173.371
11	88	Matt Crafton	ThorSport Racing	Toyota	31.147	173.371
12	25	Matt DiBenedetto	Rackley W.A.R.	Chevrolet	31.181	173.182
13	24	Jack Wood (R)	GMS Racing	Chevrolet	31.187	173.149
14	61	Chase Purdy	Hattori Racing Enterprises	Toyota	31.197	173.094
15	99	Ben Rhodes	ThorSport Racing	Toyota	31.204	173.055
16	42	Carson Hocevar	Niece Motorsports	Chevrolet	31.215	172.994
17	98	Christian Eckes	ThorSport Racing	Toyota	31.240	172.855
18	1	Hailie Deegan	David Gilliland Racing	Ford	31.241	172.850
19	40	Dean Thompson (R)	Niece Motorsports	Chevrolet	31.257	172.761
20	16	Tyler Ankrum	Hattori Racing Enterprises	Toyota	31.296	172.546
21	23	Grant Enfinger	GMS Racing	Chevrolet	31.337	172.320
22	02	Jesse Little	Young's Motorsports	Chevrolet	31.391	172.024
23	22	Austin Wayne Self	AM Racing	Chevrolet	31.663	170.546
24	44	Kris Wright	Niece Motorsports	Chevrolet	31.684	170.433
25	45	Lawless Alan (R)	Niece Motorsports	Chevrolet	31.825	169.678
26	56	Timmy Hill	Hill Motorsports	Toyota	31.987	168.819
27	9	Blaine Perkins (R)	CR7 Motorsports	Chevrolet	32.016	168.666
28	20	Matt Mills (i)	Young's Motorsports	Chevrolet	32.185	167.780
29	33	Josh Reaume	Reaume Brothers Racing	Toyota	32.397	166.682
30	12	Spencer Boyd	Young's Motorsports	Chevrolet	32.519	166.057
31	46	Ryan Huff	G2G Racing	Toyota	32.696	165.158
Qualified by owner's points
32	14	Trey Hutchens	Trey Hutchens Racing	Chevrolet	32.954	163.865
33	5	Tyler Hill	Hill Motorsports	Toyota	32.987	163.701
34	43	Jesse Iwuji (i)	Reaume Brothers Racing	Chevrolet	35.095	153.868
35	30	Tate Fogleman	On Point Motorsports	Toyota	—	—
Official qualifying results
Official starting lineup

== Race results ==
Stage 1 Laps: 30

Pos.	#	Driver	Team	Make	Pts
1	51	Corey Heim (R)	Kyle Busch Motorsports	Toyota	10
2	66	Ty Majeski	ThorSport Racing	Toyota	9
3	38	Zane Smith	Front Row Motorsports	Ford	8
4	18	Chandler Smith	Kyle Busch Motorsports	Toyota	7
5	4	John Hunter Nemechek	Kyle Busch Motorsports	Toyota	6
6	19	Derek Kraus	McAnally–Hilgemann Racing	Chevrolet	5
7	99	Ben Rhodes	ThorSport Racing	Toyota	4
8	88	Matt Crafton	ThorSport Racing	Toyota	3
9	15	Tanner Gray	David Gilliland Racing	Ford	2
10	42	Carson Hocevar	Niece Motorsports	Chevrolet	1

Stage 2 Laps: 30

Pos.	#	Driver	Team	Make	Pts
1	38	Zane Smith	Front Row Motorsports	Ford	10
2	51	Corey Heim (R)	Kyle Busch Motorsports	Toyota	9
3	4	John Hunter Nemechek	Kyle Busch Motorsports	Toyota	8
4	66	Ty Majeski	ThorSport Racing	Toyota	7
5	99	Ben Rhodes	ThorSport Racing	Toyota	6
6	42	Carson Hocevar	Niece Motorsports	Chevrolet	5
7	15	Tanner Gray	David Gilliland Racing	Ford	4
8	19	Derek Kraus	McAnally–Hilgemann Racing	Chevrolet	3
9	91	Colby Howard	McAnally–Hilgemann Racing	Chevrolet	2
10	52	Stewart Friesen	Halmar Friesen Racing	Toyota	1

Stage 3 Laps: 74

Fin.	St	#	Driver	Team	Make	Laps	Led	Status	Points
1	4	38	Zane Smith	Front Row Motorsports	Ford	134	108	Running	58
2	3	66	Ty Majeski	ThorSport Racing	Toyota	134	1	Running	51
3	21	23	Grant Enfinger	GMS Racing	Chevrolet	134	0	Running	34
4	6	18	Chandler Smith	Kyle Busch Motorsports	Toyota	134	0	Running	40
5	17	98	Christian Eckes	ThorSport Racing	Toyota	134	0	Running	32
6	1	4	John Hunter Nemechek	Kyle Busch Motorsports	Toyota	134	3	Running	45
7	12	25	Matt DiBenedetto	Rackley W.A.R.	Chevrolet	134	0	Running	30
8	8	19	Derek Kraus	McAnally–Hilgemann Racing	Chevrolet	134	0	Running	37
9	10	88	Matt Crafton	ThorSport Racing	Toyota	134	0	Running	31
10	15	99	Ben Rhodes	ThorSport Racing	Toyota	134	4	Running	37
11	11	91	Colby Howard	McAnally–Hilgemann Racing	Chevrolet	134	0	Running	28
12	7	17	Riley Herbst (i)	David Gilliland Racing	Ford	134	0	Running	0
13	14	61	Chase Purdy	Hattori Racing Enterprises	Toyota	134	0	Running	24
14	5	52	Stewart Friesen	Halmar Friesen Racing	Toyota	134	0	Running	24
15	16	42	Carson Hocevar	Niece Motorsports	Chevrolet	134	0	Running	28
16	20	16	Tyler Ankrum	Hattori Racing Enterprises	Toyota	134	0	Running	21
17	18	1	Hailie Deegan	David Gilliland Racing	Ford	134	0	Running	20
18	9	15	Tanner Gray	David Gilliland Racing	Ford	134	0	Running	25
19	25	45	Lawless Alan (R)	Niece Motorsports	Chevrolet	134	0	Running	18
20	35	30	Tate Fogleman	On Point Motorsports	Toyota	133	0	Running	17
21	33	5	Tyler Hill	Hill Motorsports	Toyota	133	0	Running	16
22	19	40	Dean Thompson (R)	Niece Motorsports	Chevrolet	133	0	Running	15
23	23	22	Austin Wayne Self	AM Racing	Chevrolet	133	0	Running	14
24	22	02	Jesse Little	Young's Motorsports	Chevrolet	132	0	Running	13
25	24	44	Kris Wright	Niece Motorsports	Chevrolet	132	0	Running	12
26	13	24	Jack Wood (R)	GMS Racing	Chevrolet	131	0	Running	11
27	26	56	Timmy Hill	Hill Motorsports	Toyota	130	0	Running	10
28	31	46	Ryan Huff	G2G Racing	Toyota	130	0	Running	9
29	32	14	Trey Hutchens	Trey Hutchens Racing	Chevrolet	130	0	Running	8
30	29	33	Josh Reaume	Reaume Brothers Racing	Toyota	129	0	Running	7
31	30	12	Spencer Boyd	Young's Motorsports	Chevrolet	127	0	Running	6
32	27	9	Blaine Perkins (R)	CR7 Motorsports	Chevrolet	126	0	Running	5
33	2	51	Corey Heim (R)	Kyle Busch Motorsports	Toyota	124	18	Running	23
34	28	20	Matt Mills (i)	Young's Motorsports	Chevrolet	91	0	Axle	0
35	34	43	Jesse Iwuji (i)	Reaume Brothers Racing	Chevrolet	24	0	Too Slow	0
Official race results

== Standings after the race ==
Drivers' Championship standings

Pos	Driver	Points
1	Ben Rhodes	319
2	John Hunter Nemechek	299 (-20)
3	Zane Smith	298 (-21)
4	Chandler Smith	290 (-29)
5	Ty Majeski	271 (-48)
6	Stewart Friesen	264 (-55)
7	Carson Hocevar	251 (-68)
8	Christian Eckes	250 (-69)
9	Grant Enfinger	236 (-83)
10	Matt Crafton	232 (-87)
Official driver's standings

- Note: Only the first 10 positions are included for the driver standings.

Previous race: 2022 Dead On Tools 200	NASCAR Camping World Truck Series; 2022 season	Next race: 2022 SpeedyCash.com 220
