= 2021 Rackley Roofing 200 =

Race details
- Race 12 of 22 of the 2021 NASCAR Camping World Truck Series
- Date: June 18, 2021
- Official name: Rackley Roofing 200
- Location: Lebanon, Tennessee, Nashville Superspeedway
- Course: Permanent racing facility
- Course length: 1.333 miles (2.145 km)
- Distance: 150 laps, 199.95 mi (321.75 km)
- Scheduled distance: 150 laps, 199.95 mi (321.75 km)
- Average speed: 114.637 miles per hour (184.490 km/h)

Pole position
Driver	Derek Kraus	McAnally–Hilgemann Racing
- Time: 29.833

Most laps led
Driver	Derek Kraus; Chandler Smith	McAnally–Hilgemann Racing; Kyle Busch Motorsports
- Laps: 48

Winner
No. 17	Ryan Preece	David Gilliland Racing

Television in the United States
- Network: Fox Sports 1
- Announcers: Vince Welch and Phil Parsons

Radio in the United States
- Radio: Motor Racing Network

The 2021 Rackley Roofing 200 was the 12th stock car race of the 2021 NASCAR Camping World Truck Series season, and the 12th iteration of the event, after a 9-year absence from racing at the track from all 3 major series of NASCAR. The race was held on Friday, June 18, 2021 in Lebanon, Tennessee at Nashville Superspeedway, a 1.333 miles (2.145 km) permanent D-shaped oval course. Ryan Preece, riding for David Gilliland Racing as a one-off race, would win his first ever race in the NASCAR Camping World Truck Series in his first ever start. Todd Gilliland of Front Row Motorsports and Grant Enfinger of ThorSport Racing would garner the rest of the podium positions, finishing 2nd and 3rd, respectively.

William Byron would make his return to the series, driving a one-off race for Rackley W.A.R.

== Background ==
Nashville Superspeedway is a motor racing complex located in Gladeville, Tennessee (though the track has a Lebanon address), United States, about 30 miles (48 km) southeast of Nashville. The track was built in 2001 and is currently used for events, driving schools and GT Academy, a reality television competition.

The layout of Nashville Superspeedway, the venue where the race was held.

It is a concrete oval track 11/3 miles (2.145 km) long. Nashville Superspeedway is owned by Dover Motorsports, Inc., which also owns Dover International Speedway. Nashville Superspeedway was the longest concrete oval in NASCAR during the time it was on the NASCAR Xfinity Series and NASCAR Camping World Truck Series circuits. Current permanent seating capacity is approximately 25,000. Additional portable seats are brought in for some events, and seating capacity can be expanded to 150,000. Infrastructure is in place to expand the facility to include a short track, drag strip, and road course.

=== Entry list ===
#	Driver	Team	Make
1	Hailie Deegan	David Gilliland Racing	Ford
2	Sheldon Creed	GMS Racing	Chevrolet
02	Kris Wright	Young's Motorsports	Chevrolet
3	Keith McGee	Jordan Anderson Racing	Chevrolet
4	John Hunter Nemechek	Kyle Busch Motorsports	Toyota
04	Cory Roper	Roper Racing	Ford
10	Jennifer Jo Cobb*	Jennifer Jo Cobb Racing	Ford
11	Spencer Davis	Spencer Davis Motorsports	Toyota
12	Tate Fogleman	Young's Motorsports	Chevrolet
13	Johnny Sauter	ThorSport Racing	Toyota
14	Trey Hutchens	Trey Hutchens Racing	Chevrolet
15	Tanner Gray	David Gilliland Racing	Ford
16	Austin Hill	Hattori Racing Enterprises	Toyota
17	Ryan Preece	David Gilliland Racing	Ford
18	Chandler Smith	Kyle Busch Motorsports	Toyota
19	Derek Kraus	McAnally–Hilgemann Racing	Toyota
20	Spencer Boyd	Young's Motorsports	Chevrolet
21	Zane Smith	GMS Racing	Chevrolet
22	Austin Wayne Self	AM Racing	Chevrolet
23	Chase Purdy	GMS Racing	Chevrolet
24	Jack Wood	GMS Racing	Chevrolet
25	Josh Berry	Rackley W.A.R.	Chevrolet
26	Tyler Ankrum	GMS Racing	Chevrolet
27	William Byron	Rackley W.A.R.	Chevrolet
30	Danny Bohn	On Point Motorsports	Toyota
32	Bret Holmes	Bret Holmes Racing	Chevrolet
33	Josh Reaume	Reaume Brothers Racing	Chevrolet
34	Lawless Alan	Reaume Brothers Racing	Toyota
38	Todd Gilliland	Front Row Motorsports	Ford
40	Ryan Truex	Niece Motorsports	Chevrolet
41	Dawson Cram	Cram Racing Enterprises	Chevrolet
42	Carson Hocevar	Niece Motorsports	Chevrolet
45	Ross Chastain	Niece Motorsports	Chevrolet
49	J. J. Yeley	CMI Motorsports	Toyota
51	Drew Dollar	Kyle Busch Motorsports	Toyota
52	Stewart Friesen	Halmar Friesen Racing	Toyota
56	Timmy Hill	Hill Motorsports	Chevrolet
66	Ty Majeski	ThorSport Racing	Toyota
68	Clay Greenfield	Clay Greenfield Motorsports	Toyota
75	Parker Kligerman	Henderson Motorsports	Chevrolet
88	Matt Crafton	ThorSport Racing	Toyota
98	Grant Enfinger	ThorSport Racing	Toyota
99	Ben Rhodes	ThorSport Racing	Toyota
Official entry list

== Practice ==
The first and final practice would take place on Friday, June 18, at 11:56 AM EST. Chandler Smith of Kyle Busch Motorsports would top the session with a time of 29.649 and an average speed of 161.489 miles per hour (259.891 km/h).

Pos.	#	Driver	Team	Make	Time	Speed
1	18	Chandler Smith	Kyle Busch Motorsports	Toyota	29.649	161.489
2	27	William Byron	Rackley W.A.R.	Chevrolet	29.686	161.288
3	26	Tyler Ankrum	GMS Racing	Chevrolet	29.900	160.134
Full practice results

== Qualifying ==
Qualifying would take place on Friday, June 18, at 6:08 AM EST. Derek Kraus of McAnally–Hilgemann Racing would win his first ever career pole in the NASCAR Camping World Truck Series with a time of 29.833 and an average speed of 160.493 miles per hour (258.288 km/h).

Pos.	#	Driver	Team	Make	Time	Speed
1	19	Derek Kraus	McAnally–Hilgemann Racing	Toyota	29.833	160.493
2	24	Jack Wood	GMS Racing	Chevrolet	30.121	158.959
3	16	Austin Hill	Hattori Racing Enterprises	Toyota	30.153	158.790
4	98	Grant Enfinger	ThorSport Racing	Toyota	30.175	158.674
5	18	Chandler Smith	Kyle Busch Motorsports	Toyota	30.189	158.601
6	17	Ryan Preece	David Gilliland Racing	Ford	30.259	158.234
7	26	Tyler Ankrum	GMS Racing	Chevrolet	30.260	158.229
8	13	Johnny Sauter	ThorSport Racing	Toyota	30.286	158.093
9	21	Zane Smith	GMS Racing	Chevrolet	30.294	158.051
10	27	William Byron	Rackley W.A.R.	Chevrolet	30.351	157.754
11	42	Carson Hocevar	Niece Motorsports	Chevrolet	30.361	157.702
12	25	Josh Berry	Rackley W.A.R.	Chevrolet	30.403	157.484
13	66	Ty Majeski	ThorSport Racing	Toyota	30.413	157.433
14	1	Hailie Deegan	David Gilliland Racing	Ford	30.472	157.128
15	88	Matt Crafton	ThorSport Racing	Toyota	30.550	156.727
16	99	Ben Rhodes	ThorSport Racing	Toyota	30.623	156.353
17	52	Stewart Friesen	Halmar Friesen Racing	Toyota	30.664	156.144
18	75	Parker Kligerman	Henderson Motorsports	Chevrolet	30.695	155.986
19	40	Ryan Truex	Niece Motorsports	Chevrolet	30.726	155.829
20	51	Drew Dollar	Kyle Busch Motorsports	Toyota	30.773	155.591
21	23	Chase Purdy	GMS Racing	Chevrolet	30.915	154.876
22	12	Tate Fogleman	Young's Motorsports	Chevrolet	30.921	154.846
23	45	Ross Chastain	Niece Motorsports	Chevrolet	30.924	154.831
24	2	Sheldon Creed	GMS Racing	Chevrolet	30.968	154.611
25	56	Timmy Hill	Hill Motorsports	Chevrolet	30.992	154.491
26	34	Lawless Alan	Reaume Brothers Racing	Toyota	30.996	154.472
27	22	Austin Wayne Self	AM Racing	Chevrolet	31.030	154.302
28	14	Trey Hutchens	Trey Hutchens Racing	Chevrolet	31.223	153.348
29	02	Kris Wright	Young's Motorsports	Chevrolet	31.231	153.309
30	11	Spencer Davis	Spencer Davis Motorsports	Toyota	31.326	152.844
31	41	Dawson Cram	Cram Racing Enterprises	Chevrolet	31.372	152.620
Qualified by owner's points
32	30	Danny Bohn	On Point Motorsports	Toyota	31.518	151.913
33	04	Cory Roper	Roper Racing	Ford	31.545	151.783
34	4	John Hunter Nemechek	Kyle Busch Motorsports	Toyota	0.000	0.000
35	38	Todd Gilliland	Front Row Motorsports	Ford	0.000	0.000
36	15	Tanner Gray	David Gilliland Racing	Ford	0.000	0.000
Failed to qualify or withdrew
37	49	J. J. Yeley	CMI Motorsports	Toyota	31.538	151.817
38	68	Clay Greenfield	Clay Greenfield Motorsports	Toyota	31.562	151.701
39	32	Bret Holmes	Bret Holmes Racing	Chevrolet	31.661	151.227
40	20	Spencer Boyd	Young's Motorsports	Chevrolet	31.806	150.538
41	3	Keith McGee	Jordan Anderson Racing	Chevrolet	32.724	146.315
42	33	Josh Reaume	Reaume Brothers Racing	Chevrolet	32.910	145.488
WD	10	Jennifer Jo Cobb	Jennifer Jo Cobb Racing	Ford	0.000	0.000
Official qualifying results

== Race results ==
Stage 1 Laps: 45

Fin.	#	Driver	Team	Make	Pts
1	19	Derek Kraus	McAnally–Hilgemann Racing	Toyota	10
2	16	Austin Hill	Hattori Racing Enterprises	Toyota	9
3	18	Chandler Smith	Kyle Busch Motorsports	Toyota	8
4	98	Grant Enfinger	ThorSport Racing	Toyota	7
5	24	Jack Wood	GMS Racing	Chevrolet	6
6	17	Ryan Preece	David Gilliland Racing	Ford	0
7	21	Zane Smith	GMS Racing	Chevrolet	4
8	13	Johnny Sauter	ThorSport Racing	Toyota	3
9	27	William Byron	Rackley W.A.R.	Chevrolet	0
10	26	Tyler Ankrum	GMS Racing	Chevrolet	1

Stage 2 Laps: 50

Fin.	#	Driver	Team	Make	Pts
1	18	Chandler Smith	Kyle Busch Motorsports	Toyota	10
2	21	Zane Smith	GMS Racing	Chevrolet	9
3	19	Derek Kraus	McAnally–Hilgemann Racing	Toyota	8
4	13	Johnny Sauter	ThorSport Racing	Toyota	7
5	88	Matt Crafton	ThorSport Racing	Toyota	6
6	99	Ben Rhodes	ThorSport Racing	Toyota	5
7	24	Jack Wood	GMS Racing	Chevrolet	4
8	15	Tanner Gray	David Gilliland Racing	Ford	3
9	98	Grant Enfinger	ThorSport Racing	Toyota	2
10	17	Ryan Preece	David Gilliland Racing	Ford	0

Stage 3 Laps: 55

Fin.	St	#	Driver	Team	Make	Laps	Led	Status	Pts
1	6	17	Ryan Preece	David Gilliland Racing	Ford	150	8	running	0
2	35	38	Todd Gilliland	Front Row Motorsports	Ford	150	0	running	35
3	4	98	Grant Enfinger	ThorSport Racing	Toyota	150	39	running	43
4	9	21	Zane Smith	GMS Racing	Chevrolet	150	0	running	46
5	17	52	Stewart Friesen	Halmar Friesen Racing	Toyota	150	5	running	32
6	15	88	Matt Crafton	ThorSport Racing	Toyota	150	0	running	37
7	16	99	Ben Rhodes	ThorSport Racing	Toyota	150	0	running	35
8	13	66	Ty Majeski	ThorSport Racing	Toyota	150	0	running	29
9	3	16	Austin Hill	Hattori Racing Enterprises	Toyota	150	2	running	37
10	34	4	John Hunter Nemechek	Kyle Busch Motorsports	Toyota	150	0	running	27
11	2	24	Jack Wood	GMS Racing	Chevrolet	150	0	running	36
12	8	13	Johnny Sauter	ThorSport Racing	Toyota	150	0	running	35
13	5	18	Chandler Smith	Kyle Busch Motorsports	Toyota	150	48	running	42
14	24	2	Sheldon Creed	GMS Racing	Chevrolet	150	0	running	23
15	21	23	Chase Purdy	GMS Racing	Chevrolet	150	0	running	22
16	11	42	Carson Hocevar	Niece Motorsports	Chevrolet	150	0	running	21
17	18	75	Parker Kligerman	Henderson Motorsports	Chevrolet	150	0	running	20
18	36	15	Tanner Gray	David Gilliland Racing	Ford	150	0	running	22
19	12	25	Josh Berry	Rackley W.A.R.	Chevrolet	150	0	running	0
20	22	12	Tate Fogleman	Young's Motorsports	Chevrolet	150	0	running	17
21	14	1	Hailie Deegan	David Gilliland Racing	Ford	150	0	running	16
22	23	45	Ross Chastain	Niece Motorsports	Chevrolet	150	0	running	0
23	7	26	Tyler Ankrum	GMS Racing	Chevrolet	150	0	running	15
24	20	51	Drew Dollar	Kyle Busch Motorsports	Toyota	150	0	running	13
25	30	11	Spencer Davis	Spencer Davis Motorsports	Toyota	150	0	running	12
26	19	40	Ryan Truex	Niece Motorsports	Chevrolet	150	0	running	11
27	27	22	Austin Wayne Self	AM Racing	Chevrolet	150	0	running	10
28	31	41	Dawson Cram	Cram Racing Enterprises	Chevrolet	150	0	running	9
29	25	56	Timmy Hill	Hill Motorsports	Chevrolet	150	0	running	8
30	32	30	Danny Bohn	On Point Motorsports	Toyota	149	0	running	7
31	33	04	Cory Roper	Roper Racing	Ford	148	0	running	6
32	29	02	Kris Wright	Young's Motorsports	Chevrolet	148	0	running	5
33	28	14	Trey Hutchens	Trey Hutchens Racing	Chevrolet	146	0	running	4
34	26	34	Lawless Alan	Reaume Brothers Racing	Toyota	142	0	running	3
35	1	19	Derek Kraus	McAnally–Hilgemann Racing	Toyota	110	48	accident	20
36	10	27	William Byron	Rackley W.A.R.	Chevrolet	78	0	engine	0
Official race results

Previous race: 2021 SpeedyCash.com 220	NASCAR Camping World Truck Series; 2021 season	Next race: 2021 CRC Brakleen 150
