= 2019 North Carolina Education Lottery 200 =

Race details
- Race 8 of 23 in the 2019 NASCAR Gander Outdoors Truck Series season
- Date: May 17, 2019
- Location: Charlotte Motor Speedway in Concord, North Carolina
- Course: Permanent racing facility
- Course length: 1.5 miles (2.4 km)
- Distance: 134 laps, 201 mi (323.4 km)

Pole position
Driver	Matt Crafton	ThorSport Racing
- Time: 30.145

Most laps led
Driver	Kyle Busch	Kyle Busch Motorsports
- Laps: 102

Winner
No. 51	Kyle Busch	Kyle Busch Motorsports

Television in the United States
- Network: FS1

Radio in the United States
- Radio: MRN

The 2019 North Carolina Education Lottery 200 was a NASCAR Gander Outdoors Truck Series race held on May 17, 2019, at Charlotte Motor Speedway in Concord, North Carolina. Contested over 134 laps on the 1.5-mile (2.4 km) asphalt speedway, it was the eighth race of the 2019 NASCAR Gander Outdoors Truck Series season.

== Background ==
=== Track ===
Charlotte Motor Speedway, the track where the race was held.

The race was held at Charlotte Motor Speedway, which is located in Concord, North Carolina. The speedway complex includes a 1.5-mile (2.4 km) quad-oval track, as well as a dragstrip and a dirt track. The speedway was built in 1959 by Bruton Smith and is considered the home track for NASCAR, as many race teams are based in the Charlotte metropolitan area. The track is owned and operated by Speedway Motorsports Inc. (SMI), with Marcus G. Smith serving as track president.

== Entry list ==
No.	Driver	Team	Manufacturer
02	Tyler Dippel (R)	Young's Motorsports	Chevrolet
2	Sheldon Creed (R)	GMS Racing	Chevrolet
3	Jordan Anderson	Jordan Anderson Racing	Chevrolet
04	Cory Roper	Roper Racing	Ford
4	Todd Gilliland	Kyle Busch Motorsports	Toyota
7	Korbin Forrister	All Out Motorsports	Toyota
8	Camden Murphy	NEMCO Motorsports	Chevrolet
9	Codie Rohrbaugh	Grant County Mulch Racing	Chevrolet
10	Jennifer Jo Cobb	Jennifer Jo Cobb Racing	Chevrolet
12	Gus Dean (R)	Young's Motorsports	Chevrolet
13	Johnny Sauter	ThorSport Racing	Ford
14	Trey Hutchens	Trey Hutchens Racing	Chevrolet
15	Anthony Alfredo (R)	DGR-Crosley	Toyota
16	Austin Hill	Hattori Racing Enterprises	Toyota
17	Tyler Ankrum (R)	DGR-Crosley	Toyota
18	Harrison Burton (R)	Kyle Busch Motorsports	Toyota
20	Spencer Boyd (R)	Young's Motorsports	Chevrolet
22	Austin Wayne Self	AM Racing	Chevrolet
24	Brett Moffitt	GMS Racing	Chevrolet
30	Brennan Poole (R)	On Point Motorsports	Toyota
33	Josh Reaume	Reaume Brothers Racing	Chevrolet
34	Josh Bilicki (i)	Reaume Brothers Racing	Chevrolet
42	Chad Finley	Chad Finley Racing	Chevrolet
44	Angela Ruch	Niece Motorsports	Chevrolet
45	Ross Chastain (i)	Niece Motorsports	Chevrolet
49	Stefan Parsons	CMI Motorsports	Chevrolet
51	Kyle Busch (i)	Kyle Busch Motorsports	Toyota
52	Stewart Friesen	Halmar Friesen Racing	Chevrolet
54	Natalie Decker (R)	DGR-Crosley	Toyota
56	Timmy Hill (i)	Hill Motorsports	Chevrolet
87	Joe Nemechek	NEMCO Motorsports	Chevrolet
88	Matt Crafton	ThorSport Racing	Ford
92	Timothy Peters	RBR Enterprises	Ford
97	Jesse Little	JJL Motorsports	Ford
98	Grant Enfinger	ThorSport Racing	Ford
99	Ben Rhodes	ThorSport Racing	Ford

== Practice ==
=== First practice ===
Sheldon Creed was the fastest in the first practice session with a time of 29.742 seconds and a speed of 181.561 mph (292.194 km/h).

Pos	No.	Driver	Team	Manufacturer	Time	Speed
1	2	Sheldon Creed (R)	GMS Racing	Chevrolet	29.742	181.561
2	4	Todd Gilliland	Kyle Busch Motorsports	Toyota	29.816	181.111
3	99	Ben Rhodes	ThorSport Racing	Ford	30.006	179.964

=== Final practice ===
Brennan Poole was the fastest in the final practice session with a time of 29.948 seconds and a speed of 180.313 mph (290.186 km/h).

Pos	No.	Driver	Team	Manufacturer	Time	Speed
1	30	Brennan Poole (R)	On Point Motorsports	Toyota	29.948	180.313
2	2	Sheldon Creed (R)	GMS Racing	Chevrolet	30.000	180.000
3	4	Todd Gilliland	Kyle Busch Motorsports	Toyota	30.016	179.904

== Qualifying ==
Matt Crafton scored the pole for the race with a time of 30.145 seconds and a speed of 179.134 mph (288.288 km/h).

=== Qualifying results ===
Pos	No	Driver	Team	Manufacturer	Time
1	88	Matt Crafton	ThorSport Racing	Ford	30.145
2	52	Stewart Friesen	Halmar Friesen Racing	Chevrolet	30.180
3	4	Todd Gilliland	Kyle Busch Motorsports	Toyota	30.236
4	18	Harrison Burton (R)	Kyle Busch Motorsports	Toyota	30.264
5	99	Ben Rhodes	ThorSport Racing	Ford	30.289
6	24	Brett Moffitt	GMS Racing	Chevrolet	30.311
7	04	Cory Roper	Roper Racing	Ford	30.325
8	51	Kyle Busch (i)	Kyle Busch Motorsports	Toyota	30.376
9	98	Grant Enfinger	ThorSport Racing	Ford	30.380
10	2	Sheldon Creed (R)	GMS Racing	Chevrolet	30.381
11	17	Tyler Ankrum (R)	DGR-Crosley	Toyota	30.403
12	13	Johnny Sauter	ThorSport Racing	Ford	30.447
13	45	Ross Chastain (i)	Niece Motorsports	Chevrolet	30.510
14	9	Codie Rohrbaugh	Grant County Mulch Racing	Chevrolet	30.515
15	15	Anthony Alfredo (R)	DGR-Crosley	Toyota	30.520
16	49	Stefan Parsons	CMI Motorsports	Chevrolet	30.588
17	30	Brennan Poole (R)	On Point Motorsports	Toyota	30.589
18	42	Chad Finley	Chad Finley Racing	Chevrolet	30.646
19	12	Gus Dean (R)	Young's Motorsports	Chevrolet	30.685
20	16	Austin Hill	Hattori Racing Enterprises	Toyota	30.700
21	54	Natalie Decker (R)	DGR-Crosley	Toyota	30.733
22	97	Jesse Little	JJL Motorsports	Ford	30.754
23	56	Timmy Hill (i)	Hill Motorsports	Chevrolet	30.760
24	87	Joe Nemechek	NEMCO Motorsports	Chevrolet	30.816
25	02	Tyler Dippel (R)	Young's Motorsports	Chevrolet	30.905
26	8	Camden Murphy	NEMCO Motorsports	Chevrolet	30.975
27	7	Korbin Forrister	All Out Motorsports	Toyota	30.976
28	3	Jordan Anderson	Jordan Anderson Racing	Chevrolet	31.168
29	22	Austin Wayne Self	AM Racing	Chevrolet	31.562
30	20	Spencer Boyd (R)	Young's Motorsports	Chevrolet	31.653
31	44	Angela Ruch	Niece Motorsports	Chevrolet	31.787
32	33	Josh Reaume	Reaume Brothers Racing	Chevrolet	32.478
Did not qualify
33	92	Timothy Peters	RBR Enterprises	Ford	30.994
34	14	Trey Hutchens	Trey Hutchens Racing	Chevrolet	31.064
35	34	Josh Bilicki (i)	Reaume Brothers Racing	Chevrolet	31.314
36	10	Jennifer Jo Cobb	Jennifer Jo Cobb Racing	Chevrolet	34.975

- Spencer Boyd and Austin Wayne Self started at the rear for having unapproved adjustments to their trucks after qualifying.

== Race ==
=== Summary ===
Matt Crafton began on pole, but was quickly overtaken by Todd Gilliland and Ben Rhodes. Natalie Decker made contact with the wall early in the race, damaging the right side of her truck and bringing out the first caution. Kyle Busch would lead most of Stage 1 but give up the win after pitting with 5 laps to go in the stage. Crafton won the stage after passing and battling Gilliland for the lead.

When Stage 2 started, Busch quickly overtook Ross Chastain and dominated, staying out when a caution occurred with 56 laps remaining due to Gus Dean spinning out and collecting Korbin Forrister and Angela Ruch. When another caution followed soon after due to debris on the track, Busch pitted and lost the lead.

Busch would chase and overtake Ben Rhodes and Johnny Sauter with 39 laps to go, ultimately winning the race as Sauter failed to keep up speed on the restart and held back some of the field. This was Busch's last truck race of 2019, making him undefeated in the season.

=== Stage Results ===
Stage One Laps: 40

Pos	No	Driver	Team	Manufacturer	Points
1	88	Matt Crafton	ThorSport Racing	Ford	10
2	4	Todd Gilliland	Kyle Busch Motorsports	Toyota	9
3	98	Grant Enfinger	ThorSport Racing	Ford	8
4	99	Ben Rhodes	ThorSport Racing	Ford	7
5	45	Ross Chastain (i)	Niece Motorsports	Chevrolet	0
6	52	Stewart Friesen	Halmar Friesen Racing	Chevrolet	5
7	51	Kyle Busch (i)	Kyle Busch Motorsports	Toyota	0
8	2	Sheldon Creed (R)	GMS Racing	Chevrolet	3
9	18	Harrison Burton (R)	Kyle Busch Motorsports	Toyota	2
10	13	Johnny Sauter	ThorSport Racing	Ford	1

Stage Two Laps: 40

Pos	No	Driver	Team	Manufacturer	Points
1	51	Kyle Busch (i)	Kyle Busch Motorsports	Toyota	0
2	45	Ross Chastain (i)	Niece Motorsports	Chevrolet	0
3	98	Grant Enfinger	ThorSport Racing	Ford	8
4	88	Matt Crafton	ThorSport Racing	Ford	7
5	24	Brett Moffitt	GMS Racing	Chevrolet	6
6	52	Stewart Friesen	Halmar Friesen Racing	Chevrolet	5
7	2	Sheldon Creed (R)	GMS Racing	Chevrolet	4
8	99	Ben Rhodes	ThorSport Racing	Ford	3
9	18	Harrison Burton (R)	Kyle Busch Motorsports	Toyota	2
10	4	Todd Gilliland	Kyle Busch Motorsports	Toyota	1

=== Final Stage Results ===
Stage Three Laps: 54

Pos	Grid	No	Driver	Team	Manufacturer	Laps	Points
1	8	51	Kyle Busch (i)	Kyle Busch Motorsports	Toyota	134	0
2	17	30	Brennan Poole (R)	On Point Motorsports	Toyota	134	35
3	2	52	Stewart Friesen	Halmar Friesen Racing	Chevrolet	134	44
4	5	99	Ben Rhodes	ThorSport Racing	Ford	134	43
5	1	88	Matt Crafton	ThorSport Racing	Ford	134	49
6	20	16	Austin Hill	Hattori Racing Enterprises	Toyota	134	31
7	3	4	Todd Gilliland	Kyle Busch Motorsports	Toyota	134	40
8	15	15	Anthony Alfredo (R)	DGR-Crosley	Toyota	134	29
9	9	98	Grant Enfinger	ThorSport Racing	Ford	134	44
10	13	45	Ross Chastain (i)	Niece Motorsports	Chevrolet	134	0
11	4	18	Harrison Burton (R)	Kyle Busch Motorsports	Toyota	134	30
12	10	2	Sheldon Creed (R)	GMS Racing	Chevrolet	134	32
13	25	02	Tyler Dippel (R)	Young's Motorsports	Chevrolet	134	24
14	22	97	Jesse Little	JJL Motorsports	Ford	134	23
15	28	3	Jordan Anderson	Jordan Anderson Racing	Chevrolet	134	22
16	23	56	Timmy Hill (i)	Hill Motorsports	Chevrolet	134	0
17	12	13	Johnny Sauter	ThorSport Racing	Ford	134	21
18	18	42	Chad Finley	Chad Finley Racing	Chevrolet	134	19
19	6	24	Brett Moffitt	GMS Racing	Chevrolet	133	24
20	7	04	Cory Roper	Roper Racing	Ford	133	17
21	29	22	Austin Wayne Self	AM Racing	Chevrolet	133	16
22	30	20	Spencer Boyd (R)	Young's Motorsports	Chevrolet	133	15
23	31	44	Angela Ruch	Niece Motorsports	Chevrolet	132	14
24	16	49	Stefan Parsons	CMI Motorsports	Chevrolet	132	13
25	27	7	Korbin Forrister	All Out Motorsports	Toyota	129	12
26	19	12	Gus Dean (R)	Young's Motorsports	Chevrolet	123	11
27	11	17	Tyler Ankrum (R)	DGR-Crosley	Toyota	111	10
28	32	33	Josh Reaume	Reaume Brothers Racing	Chevrolet	98	9
29	14	9	Codie Rohrbaugh	Grant County Mulch Racing	Chevrolet	72	8
30	26	8	Camden Murphy	NEMCO Motorsports	Chevrolet	40	7
31	21	54	Natalie Decker (R)	DGR-Crosley	Toyota	32	6
32	24	87	Joe Nemechek	NEMCO Motorsports	Chevrolet	19	5

Previous race: 2019 Digital Ally 250	NASCAR Gander Outdoors Truck Series; 2019 season	Next race: 2019 SpeedyCash.com 400
