= 2022 Dead On Tools 200 =

Seventh race of the 2022 NASCAR Camping World Truck Series

Race details
- Race 7 of 23 of the 2022 NASCAR Camping World Truck Series
- Date: May 6, 2022
- Official name: Third Annual Dead On Tools 200
- Location: Darlington, South Carolina, Darlington Raceway
- Course: Permanent racing facility
- Course length: 1.366 miles (2.198 km)
- Distance: 149 laps, 203.534 mi (327.556 km)
- Scheduled distance: 149 laps, 200.802 mi (323.159 km)
- Average speed: 91.625 mph (147.456 km/h)

Pole position
| Driver | John Hunter Nemechek | Kyle Busch Motorsports |
- Time: 28.719

Most laps led
| Driver | John Hunter Nemechek | Kyle Busch Motorsports |
- Laps: 69

Winner
| No. 4 | John Hunter Nemechek | Kyle Busch Motorsports |

Television in the United States
- Network: Fox Sports 1
- Announcers: Vince Welch, Phil Parsons, Michael Waltrip

Radio in the United States
- Radio: Motor Racing Network

The 2022 Dead On Tools 200 was the seventh stock car race of the 2022 NASCAR Camping World Truck Series and the third iteration of the event. The race was held on Friday, May 6, 2022, in Darlington, South Carolina at Darlington Raceway, a 1.366 miles (2.198 km) permanent egg-shaped racetrack. The race was increased from 147 to 149 laps, due to an overtime finish. At race's end, John Hunter Nemechek of Kyle Busch Motorsports would win, after holding off Carson Hocevar in the final restart. He would also lead the most laps. This was Nemechek's 12th career truck series win, and his first of the season. To fill out the podium, Grant Enfinger of GMS Racing would finish 3rd, respectively. Matt Crafton was going to be awarded with a 5th-place finish, but was disqualified after post-race inspection, due to the front of the truck being too low to the ground. However, a few days later, ThorSport Racing won their appeal over NASCAR, and Crafton was able to keep his 5th-place position.

== Background ==
The layout of Darlington Raceway, the venue where the race was held.

Darlington Raceway is a race track built for NASCAR racing located near Darlington, South Carolina. It is nicknamed "The Lady in Black" and "The Track Too Tough to Tame" by many NASCAR fans and drivers and advertised as "A NASCAR Tradition." It is of a unique, somewhat egg-shaped design, an oval with the ends of very different configurations, a condition which supposedly arose from the proximity of one end of the track to a minnow pond the owner refused to relocate. This situation makes it very challenging for the crews to set up their cars' handling in a way that is effective at both ends.

First held in 2001, the spring Darlington race was taken off the schedule after 2004, then it returned from 2010 to 2011. The race returned to the Truck Series schedule once again in 2020. On December 11, Darlington Raceway announced its highly popular NASCAR Throwback weekend would move to the new May 7–9 weekend, effectively making a lineal swap of the two race meetings at the track.

=== Entry list ===
- (R) denotes rookie driver.
- (i) denotes driver who are ineligible for series driver points.

| # | Driver | Team | Make | Throwback |
|---|---|---|---|---|
| 1 | Hailie Deegan | David Gilliland Racing | Ford | Bobby Allison's 1975 No. 16 Coca-Cola Cup paint scheme. |
| 02 | Jesse Little | Young's Motorsports | Chevrolet | |
| 4 | John Hunter Nemechek | Kyle Busch Motorsports | Toyota | |
| 9 | Blaine Perkins (R) | CR7 Motorsports | Chevrolet | Crew chief Doug George's 1996 No. 21 Ortho paint scheme. |
| 12 | Spencer Boyd | Young's Motorsports | Chevrolet | Michael Waltrip's 1985 No. 23 Hawaiian Punch Cup paint scheme. |
| 15 | Tanner Gray | David Gilliland Racing | Ford | |
| 16 | Tyler Ankrum | Hattori Racing Enterprises | Toyota | Mike Skinner's 2000s No. 5 Toyota Tundra paint scheme. |
| 17 | Ryan Preece | David Gilliland Racing | Ford | Tribute to Modified Tour legend Reggie Ruggiero. |
| 18 | Chandler Smith | Kyle Busch Motorsports | Toyota | Tribute to Safelite's pre-2013 white livery. |
| 19 | Derek Kraus | McAnally–Hilgemann Racing | Chevrolet | Bill McAnally's 1990 late model championship paint scheme. |
| 20 | Danny Bohn | Young's Motorsports | Chevrolet | Darrell Waltrip's 1981 No. 11 Mountain Dew Cup paint scheme. |
| 22 | Austin Wayne Self | AM Racing | Chevrolet | |
| 23 | Grant Enfinger | GMS Racing | Chevrolet | |
| 24 | Jack Wood (R) | GMS Racing | Chevrolet | |
| 25 | Matt DiBenedetto | Rackley W.A.R. | Chevrolet | Sterling Marlin's 2000 No. 40 Coors Light Cup paint scheme. |
| 30 | Tate Fogleman | On Point Motorsports | Toyota | |
| 33 | Josh Reaume | Reaume Brothers Racing | Toyota | Dale Earnhardt's 1988-2001 No. 3 Goodwrench Cup paint scheme. |
| 38 | Zane Smith | Front Row Motorsports | Ford | |
| 40 | Dean Thompson (R) | Niece Motorsports | Chevrolet | Tribute to sprint car legend Dean Thompson (unrelated). |
| 41 | Ross Chastain (i) | Niece Motorsports | Chevrolet | |
| 42 | Carson Hocevar | Niece Motorsports | Chevrolet | Travis Pastrana's 2012 No. 99 Boost Mobile Xfinity paint scheme. |
| 43 | Akinori Ogata | Reaume Brothers Racing | Toyota | Mike Skinner's 2000s No. 5 Toyota Tundra paint scheme. |
| 44 | Kris Wright | Niece Motorsports | Chevrolet | Ron Hornaday Jr.'s 2009 No. 33 VFW paint scheme. |
| 45 | Lawless Alan (R) | Niece Motorsports | Chevrolet | Jeff Gordon's 2007 No. 24 Department of Defense/DuPont Cup paint scheme. |
| 46 | Brennan Poole | G2G Racing | Toyota | Days of Thunder Cole Trickle scheme |
| 51 | Corey Heim (R) | Kyle Busch Motorsports | Toyota | |
| 52 | Stewart Friesen | Halmar Friesen Racing | Toyota | Tribute to Modified Tour legend "Jumpin'" Jack Johnson. |
| 56 | Timmy Hill | Hill Motorsports | Toyota | |
| 61 | Chase Purdy | Hattori Racing Enterprises | Toyota | Darrell Waltrip's 2005 No. 12 final Truck start paint scheme. |
| 62 | Todd Bodine | Halmar Friesen Racing | Toyota | |
| 66 | Ty Majeski | ThorSport Racing | Toyota | |
| 75 | Parker Kligerman | Henderson Motorsports | Chevrolet | |
| 88 | Matt Crafton | ThorSport Racing | Toyota | |
| 91 | Colby Howard | McAnally–Hilgemann Racing | Chevrolet | J. T. Gordon's 1970s No. 29 Cup paint scheme. |
| 98 | Christian Eckes | ThorSport Racing | Toyota | |
| 99 | Ben Rhodes | ThorSport Racing | Toyota | |
Official entry list

== Practice ==
The only 30-minute practice session is scheduled to be held on Friday, May 6, at 3:00 PM EST. John Hunter Nemechek of Kyle Busch Motorsports would set the fastest time in the session, with a time of 29.608 seconds and a speed of 166.090 mph (267.296 km/h).

| Pos. | # | Driver | Team | Make | Time | Speed |
|---|---|---|---|---|---|---|
| 1 | 4 | John Hunter Nemechek | Kyle Busch Motorsports | Toyota | 29.608 | 166.090 |
| 2 | 23 | Grant Enfinger | GMS Racing | Chevrolet | 29.672 | 165.732 |
| 3 | 66 | Ty Majeski | ThorSport Racing | Toyota | 29.697 | 165.592 |
Official practice results

== Qualifying ==
Qualifying was held on Friday, May 6, at 3:30 PM EST. Since Darlington is an oval track, the qualifying system used is a single-car, single-lap system with only one round. Whoever sets the fastest time in the round wins the pole.

John Hunter Nemechek of Kyle Busch Motorsports scored the pole for the race, with a time of 28.719 seconds and a speed of 171.232 mph (275.571 km/h). No one would fail to qualify.

| Pos. | # | Driver | Team | Make | Time | Speed |
|---|---|---|---|---|---|---|
| 1 | 4 | John Hunter Nemechek | Kyle Busch Motorsports | Toyota | 28.719 | 171.232 |
| 2 | 66 | Ty Majeski | ThorSport Racing | Toyota | 29.151 | 168.694 |
| 3 | 23 | Grant Enfinger | GMS Racing | Chevrolet | 29.161 | 168.636 |
| 4 | 38 | Zane Smith | Front Row Motorsports | Ford | 29.221 | 168.290 |
| 5 | 51 | Corey Heim (R) | Kyle Busch Motorsports | Toyota | 29.322 | 167.710 |
| 6 | 42 | Carson Hocevar | Niece Motorsports | Chevrolet | 29.343 | 167.590 |
| 7 | 88 | Matt Crafton | ThorSport Racing | Toyota | 29.403 | 167.248 |
| 8 | 25 | Matt DiBenedetto | Rackley W.A.R. | Chevrolet | 29.429 | 167.100 |
| 9 | 75 | Parker Kligerman | Henderson Motorsports | Toyota | 29.431 | 167.089 |
| 10 | 41 | Ross Chastain (i) | Niece Motorsports | Chevrolet | 29.432 | 167.083 |
| 11 | 98 | Christian Eckes | ThorSport Racing | Toyota | 29.444 | 167.015 |
| 12 | 16 | Tyler Ankrum | Hattori Racing Enterprises | Toyota | 29.450 | 166.981 |
| 13 | 17 | Ryan Preece | David Gilliland Racing | Ford | 29.457 | 166.942 |
| 14 | 19 | Derek Kraus | McAnally–Hilgemann Racing | Chevrolet | 29.459 | 166.930 |
| 15 | 99 | Ben Rhodes | ThorSport Racing | Toyota | 29.466 | 166.891 |
| 16 | 02 | Jesse Little | Young's Motorsports | Chevrolet | 29.487 | 166.772 |
| 17 | 15 | Tanner Gray | David Gilliland Racing | Ford | 29.488 | 166.766 |
| 18 | 62 | Todd Bodine | Halmar Friesen Racing | Toyota | 29.515 | 166.614 |
| 19 | 91 | Colby Howard | McAnally–Hilgemann Racing | Chevrolet | 29.516 | 166.608 |
| 20 | 24 | Jack Wood (R) | GMS Racing | Chevrolet | 29.564 | 166.337 |
| 21 | 44 | Kris Wright | Niece Motorsports | Chevrolet | 29.788 | 165.087 |
| 22 | 61 | Chase Purdy | Hattori Racing Enterprises | Toyota | 29.793 | 165.059 |
| 23 | 52 | Stewart Friesen | Halmar Friesen Racing | Toyota | 29.853 | 164.727 |
| 24 | 56 | Timmy Hill | Hill Motorsports | Toyota | 29.889 | 164.529 |
| 25 | 1 | Hailie Deegan | David Gilliland Racing | Ford | 29.891 | 164.518 |
| 26 | 45 | Lawless Alan (R) | Niece Motorsports | Chevrolet | 29.943 | 164.232 |
| 27 | 46 | Brennan Poole (i) | G2G Racing | Toyota | 30.063 | 163.576 |
| 28 | 18 | Chandler Smith | Kyle Busch Motorsports | Toyota | 30.137 | 163.175 |
| 29 | 20 | Danny Bohn | Young's Motorsports | Chevrolet | 30.222 | 162.716 |
| 30 | 9 | Blaine Perkins (R) | CR7 Motorsports | Chevrolet | 30.270 | 162.458 |
| 31 | 22 | Austin Wayne Self | AM Racing | Chevrolet | 30.342 | 162.072 |
Qualified by owner's points
| 32 | 12 | Spencer Boyd | Young's Motorsports | Chevrolet | 30.528 | 161.085 |
| 33 | 40 | Dean Thompson (R) | Niece Motorsports | Chevrolet | 30.665 | 160.365 |
| 34 | 30 | Tate Fogleman | On Point Motorsports | Toyota | 30.726 | 160.047 |
| 35 | 43 | Akinori Ogata | Reaume Brothers Racing | Toyota | 30.791 | 159.709 |
| 36 | 33 | Josh Reaume | Reaume Brothers Racing | Toyota | 32.082 | 153.282 |
Official qualifying results
Official starting lineup

== Race results ==
Stage 1 Laps: 35

| Pos. | # | Driver | Team | Make | Pts |
|---|---|---|---|---|---|
| 1 | 75 | Parker Kligerman | Henderson Motorsports | Toyota | 10 |
| 2 | 41 | Ross Chastain (i) | Niece Motorsports | Chevrolet | 0 |
| 3 | 42 | Carson Hocevar | Niece Motorsports | Chevrolet | 8 |
| 4 | 23 | Grant Enfinger | GMS Racing | Chevrolet | 7 |
| 5 | 18 | Chandler Smith | Kyle Busch Motorsports | Toyota | 6 |
| 6 | 4 | John Hunter Nemechek | Kyle Busch Motorsports | Toyota | 5 |
| 7 | 15 | Tanner Gray | David Gilliland Racing | Ford | 4 |
| 8 | 99 | Ben Rhodes | ThorSport Racing | Toyota | 3 |
| 9 | 88 | Matt Crafton | ThorSport Racing | Toyota | 2 |
| 10 | 52 | Stewart Friesen | Halmar Friesen Racing | Toyota | 1 |

Stage 2 Laps: 55

| Pos. | # | Driver | Team | Make | Pts |
|---|---|---|---|---|---|
| 1 | 42 | Carson Hocevar | Niece Motorsports | Chevrolet | 10 |
| 2 | 41 | Ross Chastain (i) | Niece Motorsports | Chevrolet | 0 |
| 3 | 75 | Parker Kligerman | Henderson Motorsports | Toyota | 8 |
| 4 | 23 | Grant Enfinger | ThorSport Racing | Chevrolet | 7 |
| 5 | 4 | John Hunter Nemechek | Kyle Busch Motorsports | Toyota | 6 |
| 6 | 98 | Christian Eckes | ThorSport Racing | Toyota | 5 |
| 7 | 88 | Matt Crafton | ThorSport Racing | Toyota | 4 |
| 8 | 17 | Ryan Preece | David Gilliland Racing | Ford | 3 |
| 9 | 99 | Ben Rhodes | ThorSport Racing | Toyota | 2 |
| 10 | 18 | Chandler Smith | Kyle Busch Motorsports | Toyota | 1 |

Stage 3 Laps: 62

| Fin. | St | # | Driver | Team | Make | Laps | Led | Status | Points |
|---|---|---|---|---|---|---|---|---|---|
| 1 | 1 | 4 | John Hunter Nemechek | Kyle Busch Motorsports | Toyota | 149 | 69 | Running | 51 |
| 2 | 6 | 42 | Carson Hocevar | Niece Motorsports | Chevrolet | 149 | 9 | Running | 53 |
| 3 | 3 | 23 | Grant Enfinger | GMS Racing | Chevrolet | 149 | 1 | Running | 48 |
| 4 | 2 | 66 | Ty Majeski | ThorSport Racing | Toyota | 149 | 0 | Running | 34 |
| 5 | 7 | 88 | Matt Crafton | ThorSport Racing | Toyota | 149 | 0 | Running | 38 |
| 6 | 9 | 75 | Parker Kligerman | Henderson Motorsports | Toyota | 149 | 9 | Running | 50 |
| 7 | 13 | 17 | Ryan Preece | David Gilliland Racing | Ford | 149 | 0 | Running | 35 |
| 8 | 4 | 38 | Zane Smith | Front Row Motorsports | Ford | 149 | 9 | Running | 30 |
| 9 | 12 | 16 | Tyler Ankrum | Hattori Racing Enterprises | Toyota | 149 | 0 | Running | 29 |
| 10 | 18 | 62 | Todd Bodine | Halmar Friesen Racing | Toyota | 149 | 3 | Running | 28 |
| 11 | 8 | 25 | Matt DiBenedetto | Rackley W.A.R. | Chevrolet | 149 | 0 | Running | 27 |
| 12 | 23 | 52 | Stewart Friesen | Halmar Friesen Racing | Toyota | 149 | 0 | Running | 28 |
| 13 | 19 | 91 | Colby Howard | McAnally–Hilgemann Racing | Chevrolet | 149 | 1 | Running | 25 |
| 14 | 16 | 02 | Jesse Little | Young's Motorsports | Chevrolet | 149 | 0 | Running | 24 |
| 15 | 33 | 40 | Dean Thompson (R) | Niece Motorsports | Chevrolet | 149 | 0 | Running | 23 |
| 16 | 24 | 56 | Timmy Hill | Hill Motorsports | Toyota | 149 | 0 | Running | 22 |
| 17 | 11 | 98 | Christian Eckes | ThorSport Racing | Toyota | 149 | 2 | Running | 26 |
| 18 | 20 | 24 | Jack Wood (R) | GMS Racing | Chevrolet | 149 | 0 | Running | 20 |
| 19 | 14 | 19 | Derek Kraus | McAnally–Hilgemann Racing | Chevrolet | 149 | 0 | Running | 19 |
| 20 | 26 | 45 | Lawless Alan (R) | Niece Motorsports | Chevrolet | 149 | 0 | Running | 18 |
| 21 | 28 | 18 | Chandler Smith | Kyle Busch Motorsports | Toyota | 149 | 0 | Running | 25 |
| 22 | 29 | 20 | Danny Bohn | Young's Motorsports | Chevrolet | 149 | 0 | Running | 16 |
| 23 | 5 | 51 | Corey Heim (R) | Kyle Busch Motorsports | Toyota | 149 | 0 | Running | 16 |
| 24 | 32 | 12 | Spencer Boyd | Young's Motorsports | Chevrolet | 149 | 0 | Running | 14 |
| 25 | 15 | 99 | Ben Rhodes | ThorSport Racing | Toyota | 148 | 0 | Running | 19 |
| 26 | 10 | 41 | Ross Chastain (i) | Niece Motorsports | Chevrolet | 148 | 46 | Running | 0 |
| 27 | 31 | 22 | Austin Wayne Self | AM Racing | Chevrolet | 147 | 0 | Running | 11 |
| 28 | 36 | 33 | Josh Reaume | Reaume Brothers Racing | Toyota | 147 | 0 | Running | 10 |
| 29 | 25 | 1 | Hailie Deegan | David Gilliland Racing | Ford | 137 | 0 | Accident | 9 |
| 30 | 27 | 46 | Brennan Poole (i) | G2G Racing | Toyota | 125 | 0 | Running | 0 |
| 31 | 30 | 9 | Blaine Perkins (R) | CR7 Motorsports | Chevrolet | 124 | 0 | Accident | 7 |
| 32 | 34 | 30 | Tate Fogleman | On Point Motorsports | Toyota | 123 | 0 | Accident | 6 |
| 33 | 21 | 44 | Kris Wright | Niece Motorsports | Chevrolet | 105 | 0 | Accident | 5 |
| 34 | 17 | 15 | Tanner Gray | David Gilliland Racing | Ford | 98 | 0 | Accident | 8 |
| 35 | 22 | 61 | Chase Purdy | Hattori Racing Enterprises | Toyota | 97 | 0 | Accident | 3 |
| 36 | 35 | 43 | Akinori Ogata | Reaume Brothers Racing | Toyota | 54 | 0 | Engine | 2 |
Official race results

== Standings after the race ==
Drivers' Championship standings

| Pos | Driver | Points |
|---|---|---|
| 1 | Ben Rhodes | 284 |
| 2 | John Hunter Nemechek | 254 (–30) |
| 3 | Chandler Smith | 252 (–32) |
| 4 | Stewart Friesen | 242 (–42) |
| 5 | Zane Smith | 241 (–43) |
| 6 | Carson Hocevar | 223 (–61) |
| 7 | Ty Majeski | 221 (–63) |
| 8 | Christian Eckes | 219 (–65) |
| 9 | Grant Enfinger | 202 (–82) |
| 10 | Tanner Gray | 188 (–96) |
Official driver's standings

- Note: Only the first 10 positions are included for the driver standings.

| Previous race: 2022 Pinty's Truck Race on Dirt | NASCAR Camping World Truck Series; 2022 season | Next race: 2022 Heart of America 200 |
