= Michele Abbate =

American racing driver (born 1988)

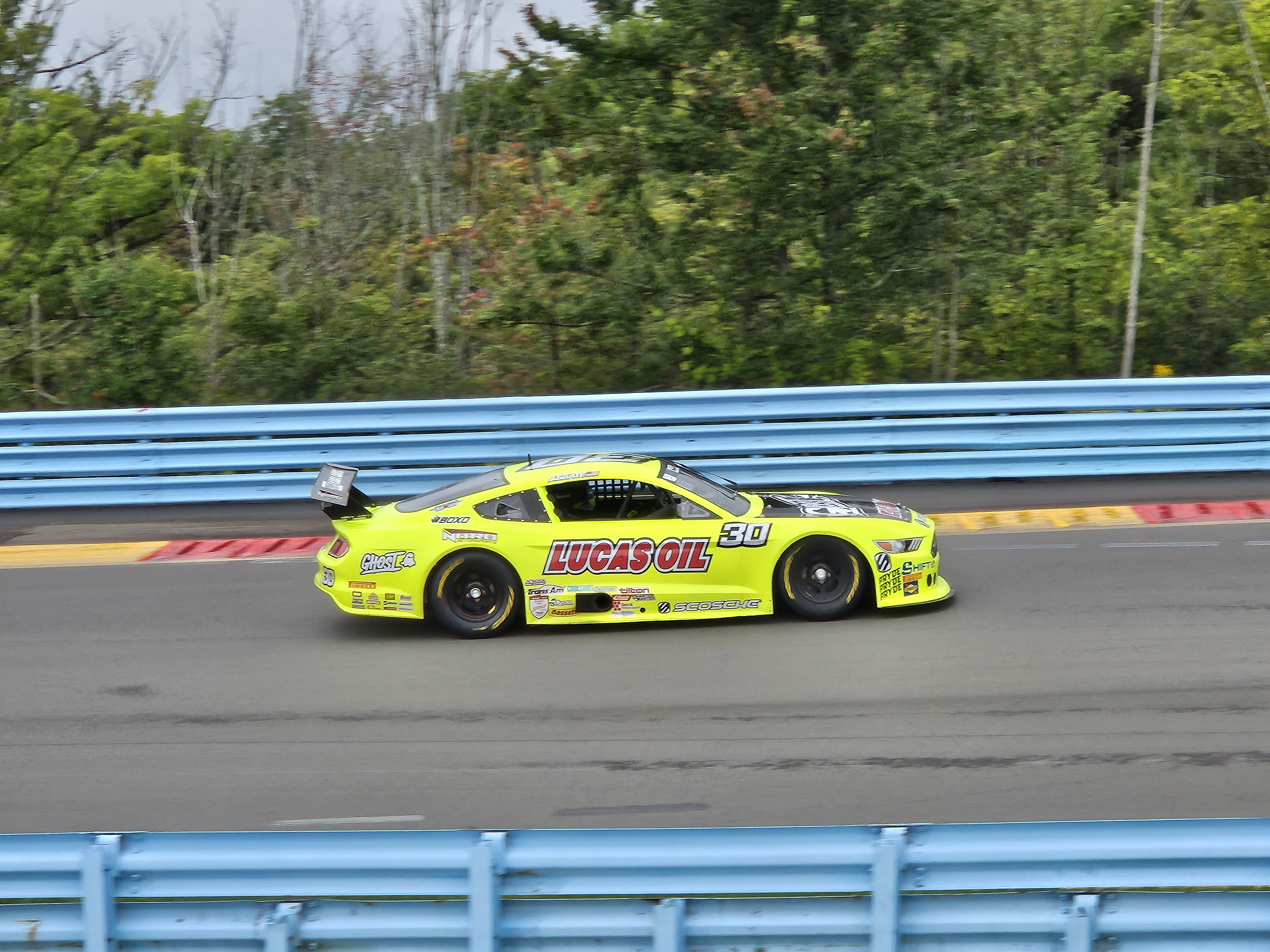
- Abbate driving at Watkins Glen in 2023
- Born: Michele Yvette Abbate; March 9, 1988 (age 38) Las Vegas, Nevada, U.S.

West Coast Championship TA2 career
- Debut season: 2019
- Current team: GRR Racing
- Engine: Chevrolet
- Best finish: 2nd in 2020

NASCAR FedEx Freight Truck Series career
- 1 race run over 1 year
- 2021 position: 81st
- Best finish: 81st (2021)
- First race: 2021 Toyota Tundra 225 (Austin)
Wins	Top tens	Poles
0	0	0

Previous series
- 2014–2015: U.S. Touring Car Championship

Championship titles
- 2015 2012: SCCA Western Conference Majors; MotoIQ Pacific Tuner Car Championship
- Statistics up to date as of December 30, 2021.

Michele Yvette Abbate (born March 9, 1988) is an American professional racing driver. She competes in the Trans-Am Series' West Coast Championship TA2 class for GRR Racing.

Much of Abbate's career has come in road racing, where she has four championships. She has also raced in the Sports Car Club of America and NASCAR Camping World Truck Series.

== Racing career ==
Abbate's started in hobby kart racing. After getting her first car at the age of 16 in 2004, Abbate competed in local autocross events sanctioned by the Sports Car Club of America. Her first national event came iat Qualcomm Stadium in San Diego in 2007, where she finished on the podium.

In 2008, Abbate moved to time attack competitions and occasionally competed in INEX legends car racing where she developed her road racing experience. In 2011, Abbate became a factory driver for Scion and finished runner-up in the 2011 National Auto Sport Association Time Trial standings, followed by winning the MotoIQ Pacific Tuner Car Championship the next year.

Abbate started competing in the United States Touring Car Championship in 2014 for GRR Racing, a team formed by Abbate and her fiancé Anthony Philleo after she lost her original sponsor. She entered the 2015 SCCA Western Conference Majors Tour after receiving $13,000 in crowdfunding, where she won the championship and became the first female driver to be given the Lindley Bothwell Memorial Cal Club Driver of the Year Award.

In 2017, Abbate raced in the Bathurst 6 Hour, where she finished 49th. The following year, she finished on the GT-1 podium in the SCCA National Championship Runoffs at Sonoma Raceway, the youngest woman to accomplish the feat.

GRR Racing switched to the Trans-Am Series' TA2 class for the 2019 season. In 2020, she finished second in the Trans-Am West Coast Championship with four top-five finishes in five races. At Sonoma, she became the first woman to finish on the podium in a TA2 race after taking third.

In May 2021, Abbate joined On Point Motorsports for her NASCAR Camping World Truck Series debut at Circuit of the Americas; she finished second at the track in the Trans-Am West Coast Championship in 2020.

== Personal life ==
Abbate's older brother Michael competed in karting.

She graduated from the University of Nevada, Las Vegas in 2011 with a bachelor's degree in communications and marketing.

== Motorsports career results ==
=== NASCAR ===
(key) (Bold – Pole position awarded by qualifying time. Italics – Pole position earned by points standings or practice time. * – Most laps led.)

==== Camping World Truck Series ====
NASCAR Camping World Truck Series results
Year	Team	No.	Make	1	2	3	4	5	6	7	8	9	10	11	12	13	14	15	16	17	18	19	20	21	22	NCWTC	Pts	Ref
2021	On Point Motorsports	30	Toyota	DAY	DAY	LVS	ATL	BRI	RCH	KAN	DAR	COA; 29	CLT	TEX	NSH	POC	KNX	GLN	GTW	DAR	BRI	LVS	TAL	MAR	PHO	81st	8	

^{*} Season still in progress
^{1} Ineligible for series points
