= Chad Johnston =

NASCAR crew chief

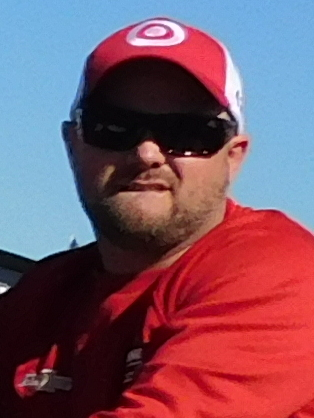
- Johnston at Talladega Superspeedway in 2016

Personal information
- Born: Chad A. Johnston; May 22, 1980 (age 46) Cayuga, Indiana, U.S.

Sport
- Country: United States
- Sport: Motor racing
- League: NASCAR Cup Series
- Team: No. 48 Legacy Motor Club

Chad A. Johnston (born May 22, 1980) is an American NASCAR crew chief who works for Legacy Motor Club as their Manager of Race Engineering as well as the crew chief of their No. 48 Toyota Camry XSE in the NASCAR Cup Series driven by Jimmie Johnson.

Johnston was previously a crew chief in the Cup Series for Chip Ganassi Racing (the No. 42 of Kyle Larson and later Matt Kenseth), Stewart–Haas Racing (the No. 14 of Tony Stewart and the No. 41 of Ryan Preece), and Michael Waltrip Racing (the No. 56 of Martin Truex Jr.) and the NASCAR Truck Series for David Gilliland Racing. Johnston was Truex's engineer prior to his promotion by MWR to crew chief midway through the 2011 season.

== Racing career ==
=== 2004–2010: Early / engineering career ===
After graduating college at Indiana State University in 2004, Johnston got a job as an engineer for Morgan–Dollar Motorsports in the NASCAR Camping World Truck Series. Over the following years, Johnston became the engineer for teams such as JTG Daugherty Racing and Evernham Motorsports.

=== 2011–2013: Michael Waltrip Racing ===
In 2011, while doing engineer work for Michael Waltrip Racing, Johnston became the crew chief for the No. 56 team, driven by Martin Truex Jr. Over the 19 races they were together, the pair got one pole, two top-fives, and five top-tens.

The following year, in 2012, Johnston became Truex's full-time crew chief. Truex and Johnston finished off the season with one pole, 19 top-tens, and seven top-fives. They would finish 11th in the point standings after making the Chase.

In 2013, the pair returned to the No. 56 team. Midway through the season at Sonoma, the team won their first race. They would finish of the season with one win, 15 top-tens, seven top-fives.

=== 2014–2015: Stewart–Haas Racing ===
Johnston moved over to the No. 14 team for Stewart–Haas Racing, driven by Tony Stewart. However, midway through the season, Stewart decided not to drive for three races, being replaced by Regan Smith for the first of those races and Jeff Burton for the next two after being involved in the death of Kevin Ward Jr. Stewart would return to the seat at Atlanta.

In 2015, Stewart and Johnston would pair up again. However, this season would prove to be a challenge for Stewart, as he would only be able to get three top-tens throughout the season, leading up to a 28th-place finish in the points standings.

=== 2016–2020: Chip Ganassi Racing ===
Johnston would again move teams in 2016, this time moving to the No. 42 team at Chip Ganassi Racing, driven by Kyle Larson. At Michigan in the fall, Larson would get his first win in the Cup Series. The group would end up finishing the season with one win, 14 top-tens, and nine top-fives leading up to a ninth place in the championship standings.

Larson and Johnston would start off the 2017 season with five top twos, one of them being a win. Larson would win 3 more times throughout the season, finishing eighth in the championship standings after having a lack of consistency in the playoffs.

Johnston would remain as Larson's crew chief in 2018 and 2019. After a winless 2018 season, the two won at Dover International Speedway in the fall. In 2020, Johnston would become the crew chief for Matt Kenseth after Kyle Larson was suspended for saying a racial slur during a streamed iRacing event.

Although he did score a second-place finish in the 2020 Brickyard 400 and a tenth-place finish in his first race with the team at Darlington in May, Kenseth's return was largely a disappointment, and Johnston was released as the crew chief of the No. 42 on August 4 and replaced by the team's engineer since 2016, Phil Surgen, starting at the Michigan doubleheader. Surgen also substituted for Johnston in the crew chief role for one race in 2016, also coincidentally at Michigan, where he would lead Larson and the team to a third-place finish in that race. Johnston had been suspended due to the lug nut rule.

=== 2020–2022: David Gilliland Racing ===
With one race to go in the 2020 ARCA Menards Series West season, Johnston was picked up by DGR–Crosley to crew chief their No. 17 Ford of Taylor Gray in the season-finale at Phoenix, where Gray would finish third in this race. Johnston stayed on with the team, now just known as David Gilliland Racing, in 2021, crew chiefing Gray in his full season in the ARCA Menards Series East and part-time schedule in the main ARCA Menards Series.

In 2020, it was announced by DGR–Crosley that Taylor Gray would make his Truck Series debut in 2021, driving the No. 17 Ford part-time, and Johnston would be Gray's crew chief.

=== 2023–2024: Stewart–Haas Racing ===
In December 2022, Johnston returned to Stewart–Haas Racing and the NASCAR Cup Series after it was announced that driver, Ryan Preece would replace Cole Custer in the No. 41 for the 2023 season. Johnston and Preece previously worked together in the Truck Series with David Gilliland Racing, having won together twice, at Nashville Superspeedway in 2021 and 2022.

=== 2025–present: Legacy Motor Club ===
When SHR closed down after the 2024 season, Johnston was hired by Legacy Motor Club days after the 2024 season-finale at Phoenix to be the team's Manager of Race Engineering. On February 5, 2025, it was announced that Johnson would crew chief LMC's No. 84 for Jimmie Johnson.
