= 2021 NASCAR Camping World Truck Series =

American motorsport season

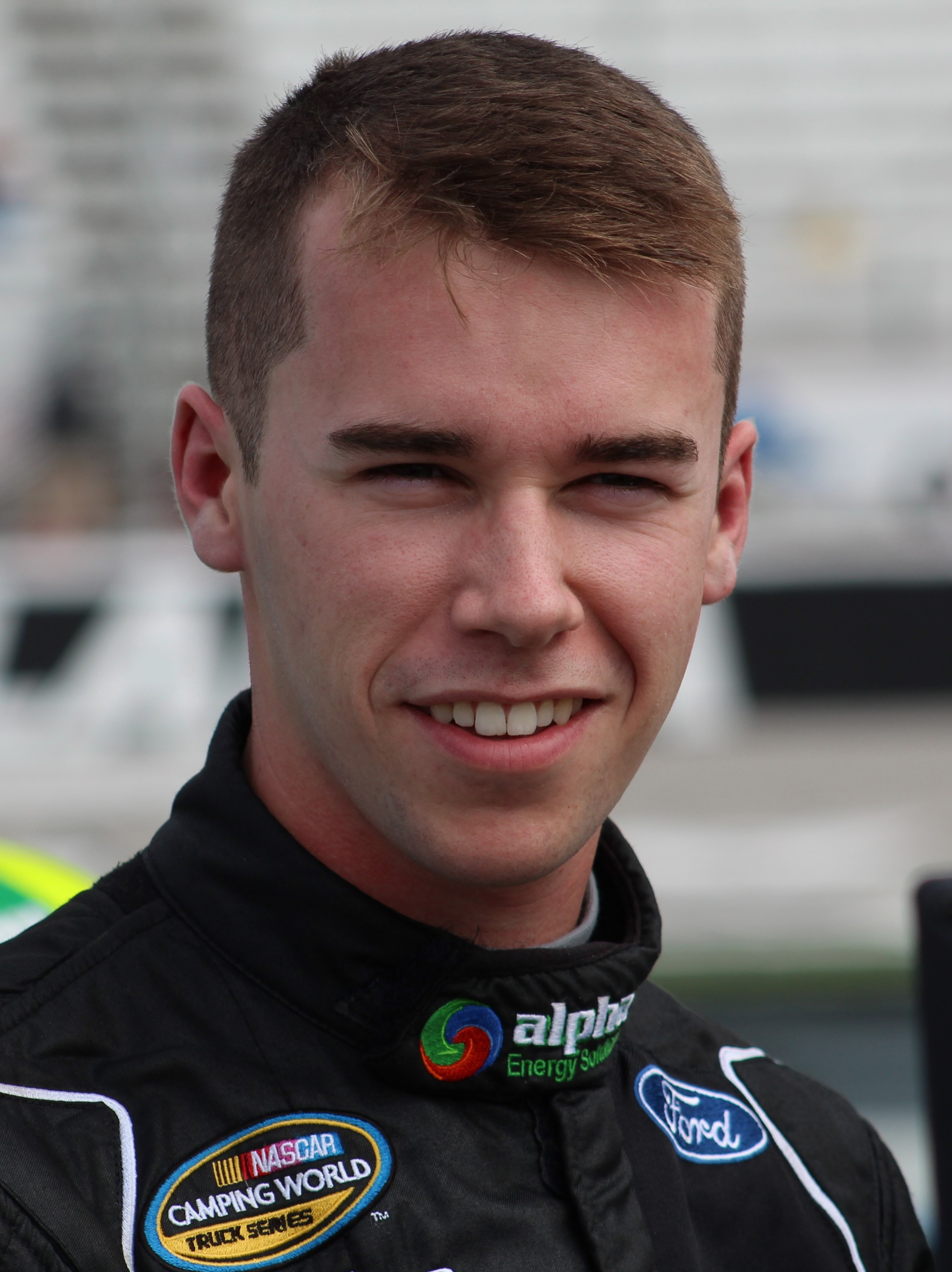
Ben Rhodes, the 2021 Camping World Truck Series champion.

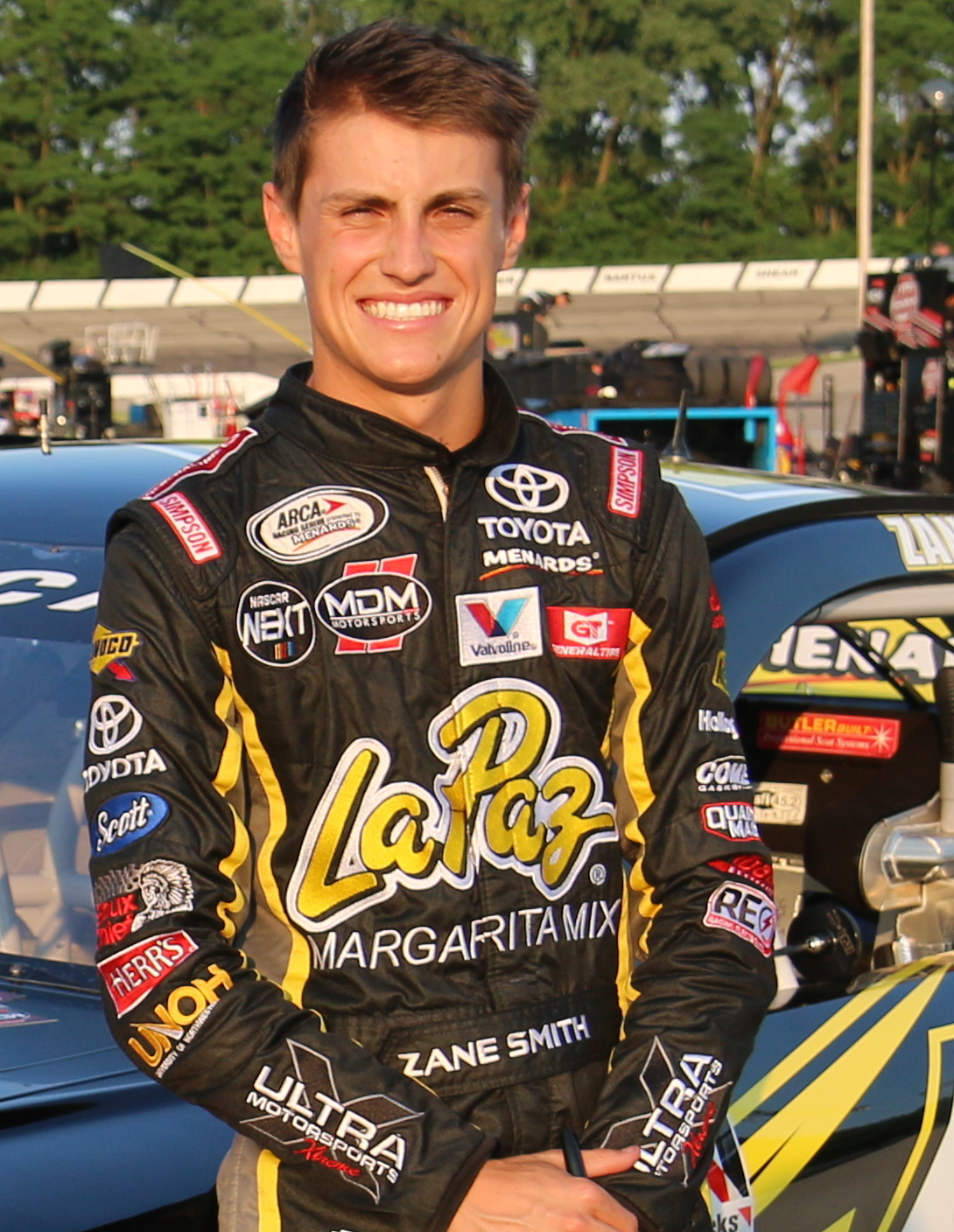
Zane Smith finished second behind Rhodes in the championship.

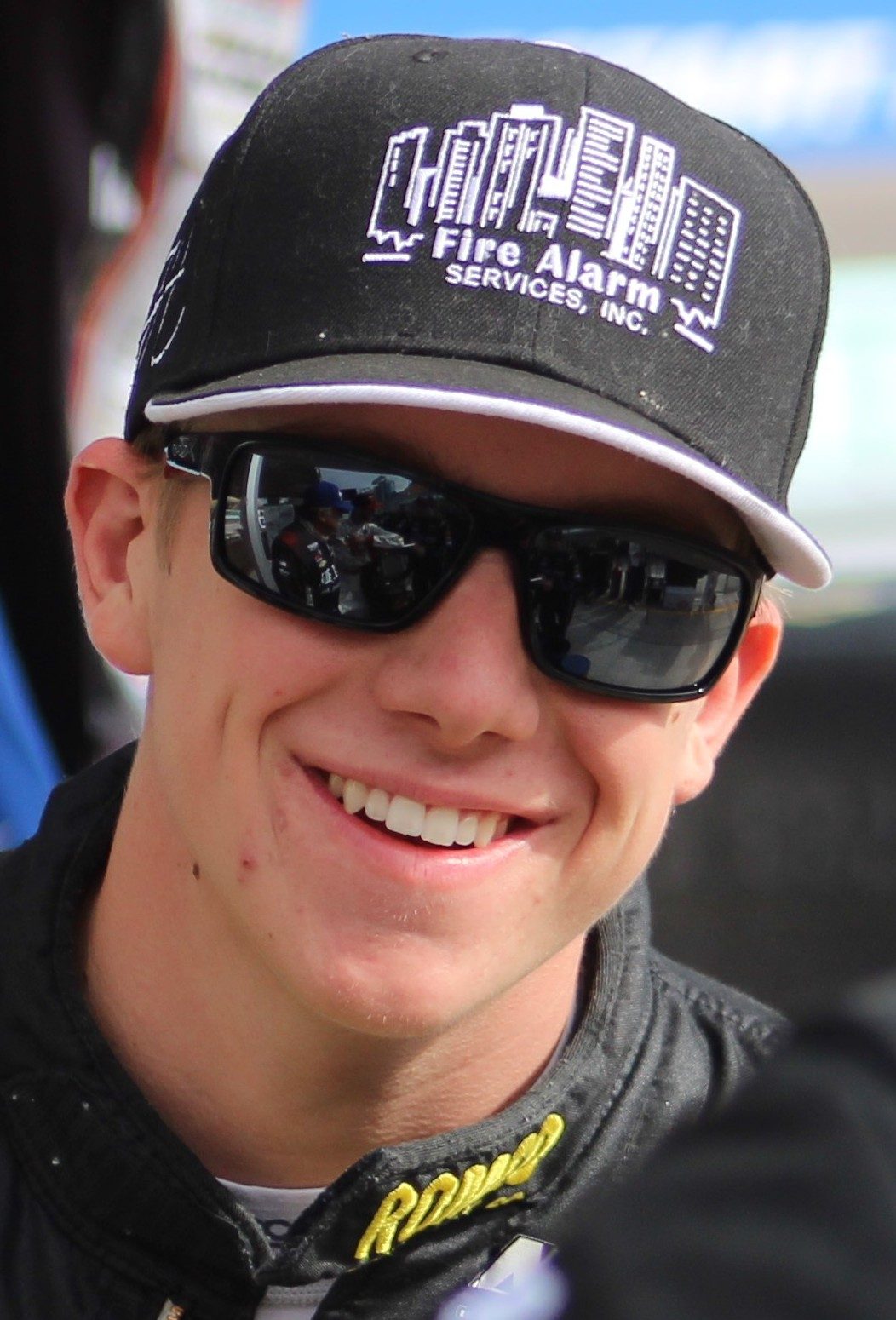
John Hunter Nemechek won the Regular Season Championship, but finished third in the championship.

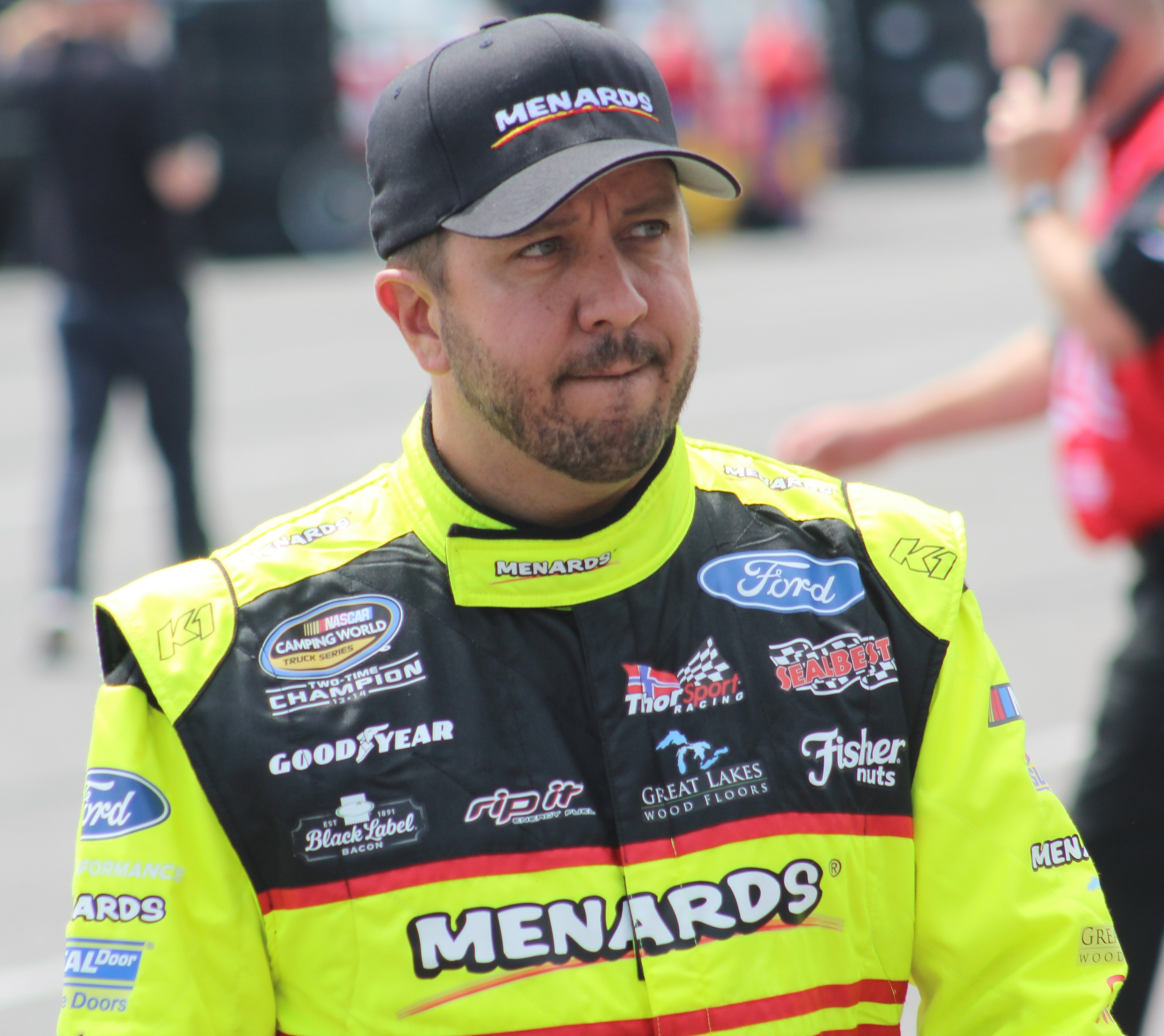
Matt Crafton finished fourth in the championship.

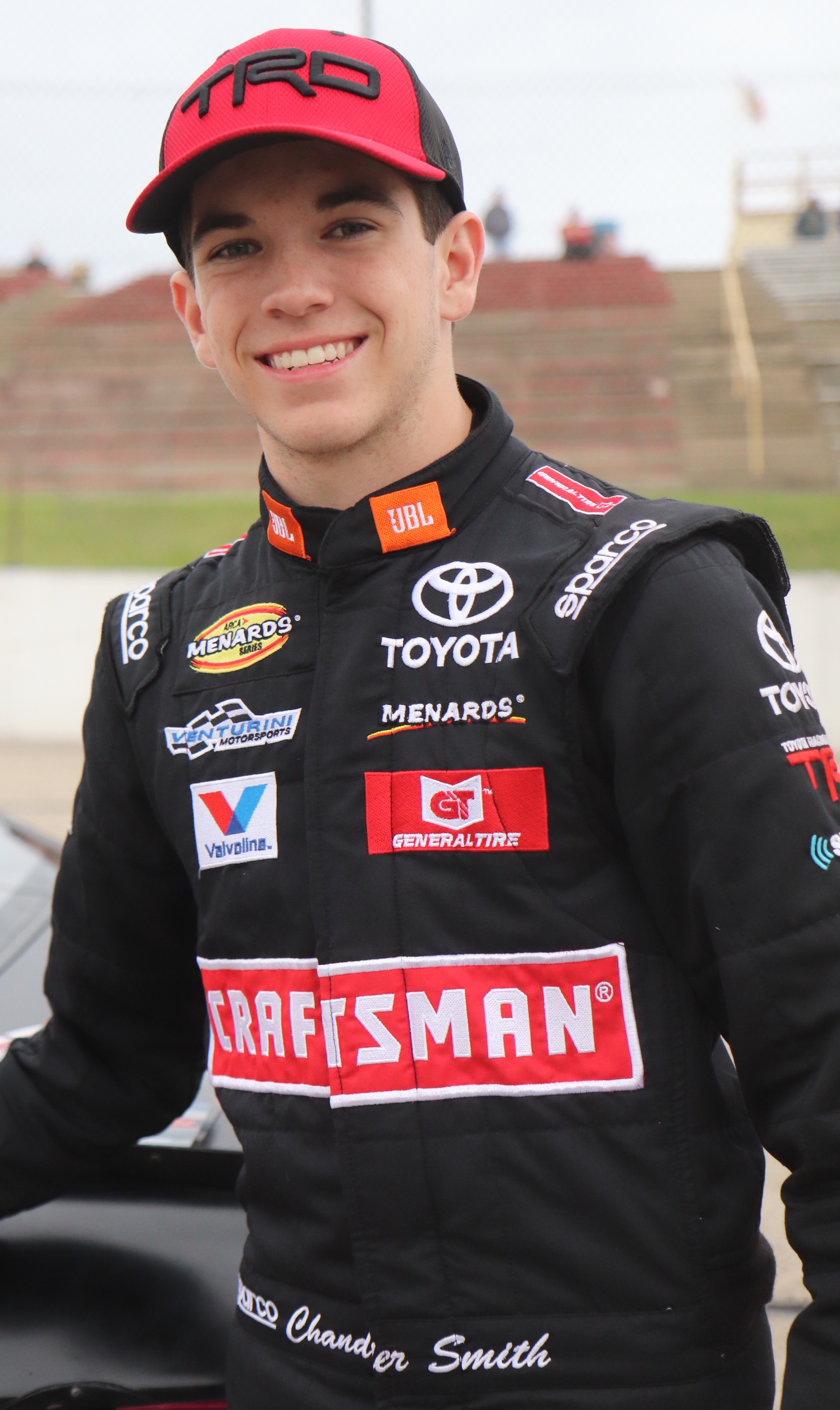
Chandler Smith was the Rookie of the Year.

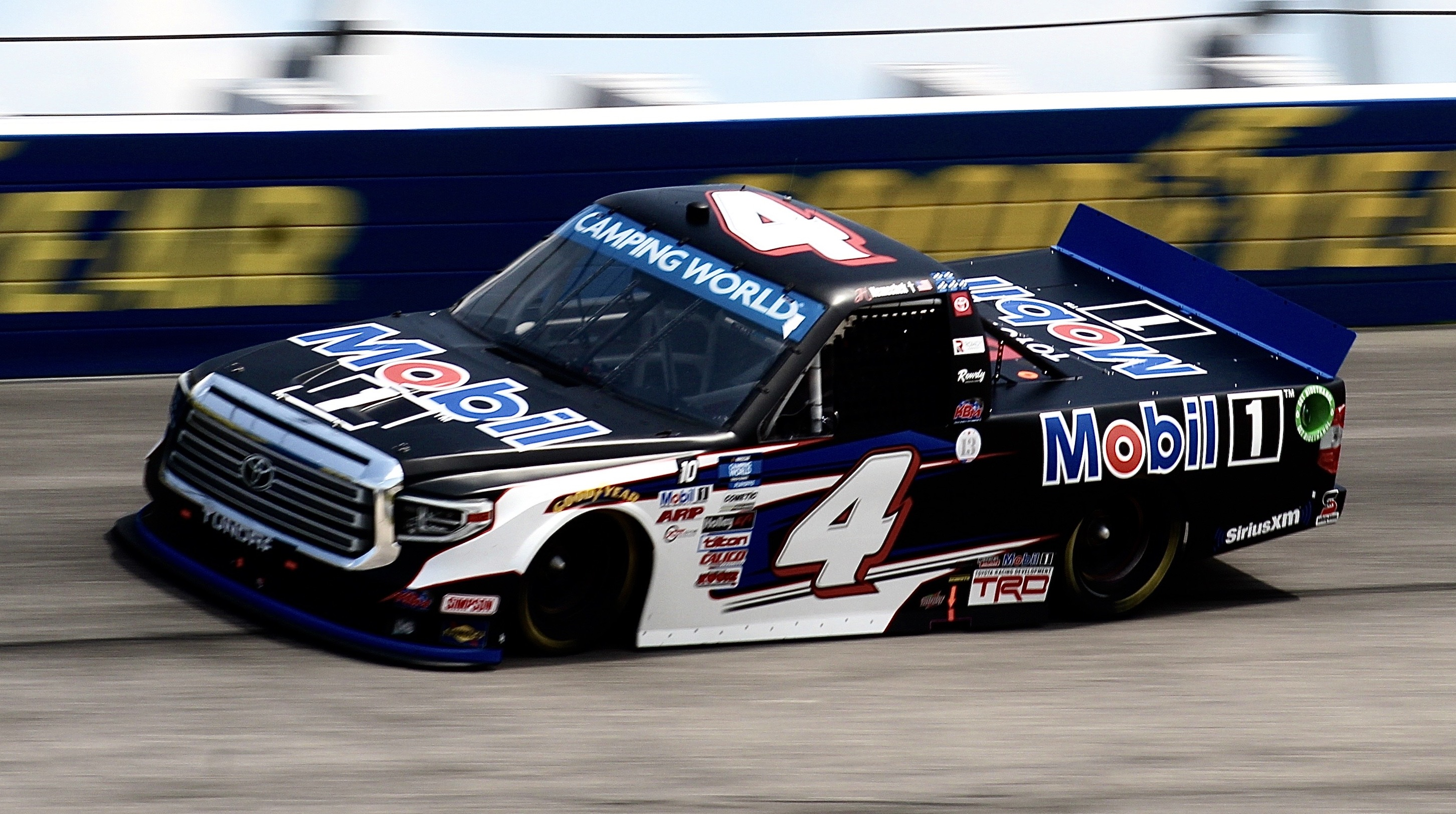
Toyota won the Manufacturers' championship with 15 wins and 837 points.

The 2021 NASCAR Camping World Truck Series was the 27th season of the NASCAR Camping World Truck Series, a Pickup truck racing series sanctioned by NASCAR in the United States. The season began at Daytona International Speedway with the NextEra Energy 250 on February 12. The regular season ended with the race at Watkins Glen International on August 7. The NASCAR playoffs ended with the Lucas Oil 150 at Phoenix Raceway on November 5.

This season marks the 13th for Camping World Holdings as the series' title sponsor. After two years of advertising their Gander Outdoors retail chain in the title sponsorship, company CEO Marcus Lemonis announced on September 15, 2020, that the sponsorship would switch back to the Camping World brand beginning in 2021, which was the same name of the series from 2009 to 2018. Following the Corn Belt 150 at Knoxville Raceway, John Hunter Nemechek of Kyle Busch Motorsports clinched the Regular Season Championship one race early. Toyota claimed its 12th Manufacturer Championship following the United Rentals 200 at Martinsville Speedway. At the season finale, Ben Rhodes of ThorSport Racing became the 2021 Truck Series champion.

== Teams and drivers ==
=== Complete schedule ===
Manufacturer	Team	No.	Race driver	Crew chief
Chevrolet	AM Racing	22	Austin Wayne Self	Ryan Salomon
Chevrolet	GMS Racing	2	Sheldon Creed	Jeff Stankiewicz
Chevrolet	GMS Racing	21	Zane Smith	Kevin Manion
Chevrolet	GMS Racing	23	Chase Purdy (R) 21	Jeff Hensley
Chevrolet	GMS Racing	23	A. J. Allmendinger 1	Jeff Hensley
Chevrolet	GMS Racing	24	Raphaël Lessard 7	Chad Walter
Chevrolet	GMS Racing	24	Ryan Reed 1	Chad Walter
Chevrolet	GMS Racing	24	Jack Wood 12	Chad Walter
Chevrolet	GMS Racing	24	Chase Elliott 1	Chad Walter
Chevrolet	GMS Racing	24	Doug Coby 1	Chad Walter
Chevrolet	GMS Racing	26	Tyler Ankrum	Charles Denike
Chevrolet	Jordan Anderson Racing	3	Jordan Anderson 9	Bruce Cook 9 Andrew Patterson 3 Jordan Anderson 2 Danny Gill 2 Teddy Brown 6
Chevrolet	Jordan Anderson Racing	3	Bobby Reuse 2	Bruce Cook 9 Andrew Patterson 3 Jordan Anderson 2 Danny Gill 2 Teddy Brown 6
Chevrolet	Jordan Anderson Racing	3	J. R. Heffner 1	Bruce Cook 9 Andrew Patterson 3 Jordan Anderson 2 Danny Gill 2 Teddy Brown 6
Chevrolet	Jordan Anderson Racing	3	Howie DiSavino III 5	Bruce Cook 9 Andrew Patterson 3 Jordan Anderson 2 Danny Gill 2 Teddy Brown 6
Chevrolet	Jordan Anderson Racing	3	Roger Reuse 1	Bruce Cook 9 Andrew Patterson 3 Jordan Anderson 2 Danny Gill 2 Teddy Brown 6
Chevrolet	Jordan Anderson Racing	3	Keith McGee 2	Bruce Cook 9 Andrew Patterson 3 Jordan Anderson 2 Danny Gill 2 Teddy Brown 6
Chevrolet	Jordan Anderson Racing	3	Parker Price-Miller 1	Bruce Cook 9 Andrew Patterson 3 Jordan Anderson 2 Danny Gill 2 Teddy Brown 6
Chevrolet	Jordan Anderson Racing	3	Sage Karam 1	Bruce Cook 9 Andrew Patterson 3 Jordan Anderson 2 Danny Gill 2 Teddy Brown 6
Chevrolet	Niece Motorsports	40	Ryan Truex	Wally Rogers 10; Cody Efaw 5 Matt Weber 7
Chevrolet	Niece Motorsports	42	Carson Hocevar (R)	Cody Efaw 7 Phil Gould 15
Chevrolet	Niece Motorsports	45	Brett Moffitt 6	Phil Gould 7 Matt Noyce 15; Wally Rogers 8
Chevrolet	Niece Motorsports	45	Bayley Currey 4	Phil Gould 7 Matt Noyce 15; Wally Rogers 8
Chevrolet	Niece Motorsports	45	Erik Darnell 1	Phil Gould 7 Matt Noyce 15; Wally Rogers 8
Chevrolet	Niece Motorsports	45	Ross Chastain 2	Phil Gould 7 Matt Noyce 15; Wally Rogers 8
Chevrolet	Niece Motorsports	45	Jett Noland 1	Phil Gould 7 Matt Noyce 15; Wally Rogers 8
Chevrolet	Niece Motorsports	45	Chad Chastain 1	Phil Gould 7 Matt Noyce 15; Wally Rogers 8
Chevrolet	Niece Motorsports	45	Jake Griffin 1	Phil Gould 7 Matt Noyce 15; Wally Rogers 8
Chevrolet	Niece Motorsports	45	Lawless Alan 4	Phil Gould 7 Matt Noyce 15; Wally Rogers 8
Chevrolet	Niece Motorsports	45	Chris Hacker 2	Phil Gould 7 Matt Noyce 15; Wally Rogers 8
Chevrolet	Rackley W.A.R.	25	Timothy Peters 10	Chad Kendrick
Chevrolet	Rackley W.A.R.	25	Josh Berry 9	Chad Kendrick
Chevrolet	Rackley W.A.R.	25	Brett Moffitt 1	Chad Kendrick
Chevrolet	Rackley W.A.R.	25	Willie Allen 2	Chad Kendrick
Chevrolet	Young's Motorsports	02	Kris Wright (R) 16	Eddie Troconis 20; Steven Dawson 2
Chevrolet	Young's Motorsports	02	Kaz Grala 3	Eddie Troconis 20; Steven Dawson 2
Chevrolet	Young's Motorsports	02	Josh Berry 1	Eddie Troconis 20; Steven Dawson 2
Chevrolet	Young's Motorsports	02	Daniel Suárez 1	Eddie Troconis 20; Steven Dawson 2
Chevrolet	Young's Motorsports	02	Chris Windom 1 (Note: Michael Annett was initially entered in the truck and drove it in practice and qualifying, but was replaced by Windom for the race due to a leg injury.)	Eddie Troconis 20; Steven Dawson 2
Chevrolet	Young's Motorsports	12	Tate Fogleman	Ryan London
Chevrolet	Young's Motorsports	20	Spencer Boyd 21	Joe Lax
Chevrolet	Young's Motorsports	20	Kyle Strickler 1	Joe Lax
Ford	David Gilliland Racing	1	Hailie Deegan (R)	Mike Hillman Jr.
Ford	David Gilliland Racing	15	Tanner Gray	Shane Wilson 6 Seth Smith 6 Jacob Hampton 1 Marcus Richmond 7 Chad Johnston 1 Wes Ward 1
Ford	Front Row Motorsports (Note: Entries were fielded in a collaboration with David Gilliland Racing.)	38	Todd Gilliland	Chris Lawson 21; David Gilliland 1
Toyota	Halmar Friesen Racing	52	Stewart Friesen	Tripp Bruce 9 Jon Leonard 13
Toyota	Hattori Racing Enterprises	16	Austin Hill	Scott Zipadelli
Toyota	Kyle Busch Motorsports	4	John Hunter Nemechek	Eric Phillips
Toyota	Kyle Busch Motorsports	18	Chandler Smith (R)	Paul Andrews 1 Danny Stockman Jr. 21
Toyota	Kyle Busch Motorsports	51	Drew Dollar 8	Mardy Lindley
Toyota	Kyle Busch Motorsports	51	Parker Chase 2	Mardy Lindley
Toyota	Kyle Busch Motorsports	51	Kyle Busch 5	Mardy Lindley
Toyota	Kyle Busch Motorsports	51	Martin Truex Jr. 1	Mardy Lindley
Toyota	Kyle Busch Motorsports	51	Corey Heim 3	Mardy Lindley
Toyota	Kyle Busch Motorsports	51	Brian Brown 1	Mardy Lindley
Toyota	Kyle Busch Motorsports	51	Derek Griffith 1	Mardy Lindley
Toyota	Kyle Busch Motorsports	51	Dylan Lupton 1	Mardy Lindley
Toyota	McAnally–Hilgemann Racing	19	Derek Kraus	Matt Noyce 5 Mark Hillman 17
Toyota	On Point Motorsports	30	Danny Bohn 20	Steven Lane
Toyota	On Point Motorsports	30	Michele Abbate 1	Steven Lane
Toyota	On Point Motorsports	30	Brennan Poole 1	Steven Lane
Toyota	ThorSport Racing	13	Johnny Sauter	Joe Shear Jr. 21; Bud Haefele 1
Toyota	ThorSport Racing	88	Matt Crafton	Junior Joiner
Toyota	ThorSport Racing	98	Grant Enfinger 12	Jeriod Prince
Toyota	ThorSport Racing	98	Christian Eckes 10	Jeriod Prince
Toyota	ThorSport Racing	99	Ben Rhodes	Rich Lushes
Chevrolet 14 Toyota 8	Reaume Brothers Racing	33	Jason White 3	John Reaume 10; Andrew Abbott 1 Paul Clapprood 3 George Ingram 1 Josh Reaume 4 Matthew Wolper 3
Chevrolet 14 Toyota 8	Reaume Brothers Racing	33	Jesse Iwuji 3	John Reaume 10; Andrew Abbott 1 Paul Clapprood 3 George Ingram 1 Josh Reaume 4 Matthew Wolper 3
Chevrolet 14 Toyota 8	Reaume Brothers Racing	33	Akinori Ogata 2	John Reaume 10; Andrew Abbott 1 Paul Clapprood 3 George Ingram 1 Josh Reaume 4 Matthew Wolper 3
Chevrolet 14 Toyota 8	Reaume Brothers Racing	33	Myatt Snider 1	John Reaume 10; Andrew Abbott 1 Paul Clapprood 3 George Ingram 1 Josh Reaume 4 Matthew Wolper 3
Chevrolet 14 Toyota 8	Reaume Brothers Racing	33	Keith McGee 2	John Reaume 10; Andrew Abbott 1 Paul Clapprood 3 George Ingram 1 Josh Reaume 4 Matthew Wolper 3
Chevrolet 14 Toyota 8	Reaume Brothers Racing	33	B. J. McLeod 1	John Reaume 10; Andrew Abbott 1 Paul Clapprood 3 George Ingram 1 Josh Reaume 4 Matthew Wolper 3
Chevrolet 14 Toyota 8	Reaume Brothers Racing	33	Cameron Lawrence 1	John Reaume 10; Andrew Abbott 1 Paul Clapprood 3 George Ingram 1 Josh Reaume 4 Matthew Wolper 3
Chevrolet 14 Toyota 8	Reaume Brothers Racing	33	Josh Reaume 3	John Reaume 10; Andrew Abbott 1 Paul Clapprood 3 George Ingram 1 Josh Reaume 4 Matthew Wolper 3
Chevrolet 14 Toyota 8	Reaume Brothers Racing	33	Devon Rouse 1	John Reaume 10; Andrew Abbott 1 Paul Clapprood 3 George Ingram 1 Josh Reaume 4 Matthew Wolper 3
Chevrolet 14 Toyota 8	Reaume Brothers Racing	33	Armani Williams 1	John Reaume 10; Andrew Abbott 1 Paul Clapprood 3 George Ingram 1 Josh Reaume 4 Matthew Wolper 3
Chevrolet 14 Toyota 8	Reaume Brothers Racing	33	Ryan Ellis 1	John Reaume 10; Andrew Abbott 1 Paul Clapprood 3 George Ingram 1 Josh Reaume 4 Matthew Wolper 3
Chevrolet 14 Toyota 8	Reaume Brothers Racing	33	C. J. McLaughlin 2	John Reaume 10; Andrew Abbott 1 Paul Clapprood 3 George Ingram 1 Josh Reaume 4 Matthew Wolper 3
Chevrolet 14 Toyota 8	Reaume Brothers Racing	33	Chris Hacker 1	John Reaume 10; Andrew Abbott 1 Paul Clapprood 3 George Ingram 1 Josh Reaume 4 Matthew Wolper 3
Toyota 19 Chevrolet 3	Reaume Brothers Racing	34	Jesse Iwuji 2	Andrew Abbott 2 Paul Clapprood 8 John Reaume 9 Frank Kerr 2
Toyota 19 Chevrolet 3	Reaume Brothers Racing	34	Lawless Alan 5	Andrew Abbott 2 Paul Clapprood 8 John Reaume 9 Frank Kerr 2
Toyota 19 Chevrolet 3	Reaume Brothers Racing	34	B. J. McLeod 1	Andrew Abbott 2 Paul Clapprood 8 John Reaume 9 Frank Kerr 2
Toyota 19 Chevrolet 3	Reaume Brothers Racing	34	Ryan Ellis 1	Andrew Abbott 2 Paul Clapprood 8 John Reaume 9 Frank Kerr 2
Toyota 19 Chevrolet 3	Reaume Brothers Racing	34	Jake Griffin 2	Andrew Abbott 2 Paul Clapprood 8 John Reaume 9 Frank Kerr 2
Toyota 19 Chevrolet 3	Reaume Brothers Racing	34	Josh Reaume 4	Andrew Abbott 2 Paul Clapprood 8 John Reaume 9 Frank Kerr 2
Toyota 19 Chevrolet 3	Reaume Brothers Racing	34	C. J. McLaughlin 2	Andrew Abbott 2 Paul Clapprood 8 John Reaume 9 Frank Kerr 2
Toyota 19 Chevrolet 3	Reaume Brothers Racing	34	Akinori Ogata 1	Andrew Abbott 2 Paul Clapprood 8 John Reaume 9 Frank Kerr 2
Toyota 19 Chevrolet 3	Reaume Brothers Racing	34	Chris Hacker 1 (Note: At the Gateway race, which did not have qualifying, Chris Hacker was initially entered in the No. 31 truck for On Point Motorsports, which was excluded due to the team being too low in owner points as there were over 40 trucks on the entry list. As a result, OPM partnered with Reaume Brothers Racing, and Hacker moved to that team's No. 34 truck, which had previously been TBA on the entry list.)	Andrew Abbott 2 Paul Clapprood 8 John Reaume 9 Frank Kerr 2
Toyota 19 Chevrolet 3	Reaume Brothers Racing	34	Dylan Lupton 2 (Note: Entries were fielded in a collaboration with DCC Racing.)	Andrew Abbott 2 Paul Clapprood 8 John Reaume 9 Frank Kerr 2
Toyota 19 Chevrolet 3	Reaume Brothers Racing	34	Will Rodgers 1	Andrew Abbott 2 Paul Clapprood 8 John Reaume 9 Frank Kerr 2

=== Limited schedule ===
Manufacturer	Team	No.	Race driver	Crew chief	Rounds
Chevrolet	AM Racing	37	Brett Moffitt	Jamie Jones	1
Chevrolet	Bret Holmes Racing	32	Bret Holmes	Shane Huffman	8
Chevrolet	Bret Holmes Racing	32	Sam Mayer	Shane Huffman	4
Chevrolet	Bret Holmes Racing	32	Ty Dillon	Shane Huffman	1
Chevrolet	CMI Motorsports	72	Samuel LeComte	Steve Kuykendall 1 Tim Silva 1	2
Chevrolet	CMI Motorsports	83	Tim Viens (R)	Tim Silva 3 Matt Cooper 1	2
Chevrolet	CMI Motorsports	83	Trevor Collins	Tim Silva 3 Matt Cooper 1	1
Chevrolet	CMI Motorsports	83	Brad Gross	Tim Silva 3 Matt Cooper 1	1
Chevrolet	CR7 Motorsports	9	Codie Rohrbaugh	Doug George	8
Chevrolet	CR7 Motorsports	9	Grant Enfinger	Doug George	9
Chevrolet	CR7 Motorsports	9	Colby Howard	Doug George	3
Chevrolet	FDNY Racing	28	Bryan Dauzat	Jim Rosenblum	3
Chevrolet	Niece Motorsports	44	James Buescher	Tim Mooney 5 Matt Noyce 2 Cody Efaw 2 Wally Rogers 1 Matt Weber 1	1
Chevrolet	Niece Motorsports	44	Jett Noland	Tim Mooney 5 Matt Noyce 2 Cody Efaw 2 Wally Rogers 1 Matt Weber 1	2
Chevrolet	Niece Motorsports	44	Conor Daly	Tim Mooney 5 Matt Noyce 2 Cody Efaw 2 Wally Rogers 1 Matt Weber 1	1
Chevrolet	Niece Motorsports	44	Ross Chastain	Tim Mooney 5 Matt Noyce 2 Cody Efaw 2 Wally Rogers 1 Matt Weber 1	2
Chevrolet	Niece Motorsports	44	Kyle Larson	Tim Mooney 5 Matt Noyce 2 Cody Efaw 2 Wally Rogers 1 Matt Weber 1	1
Chevrolet	Niece Motorsports	44	Bayley Currey	Tim Mooney 5 Matt Noyce 2 Cody Efaw 2 Wally Rogers 1 Matt Weber 1	1
Chevrolet	Niece Motorsports	44	Logan Bearden	Tim Mooney 5 Matt Noyce 2 Cody Efaw 2 Wally Rogers 1 Matt Weber 1	1
Chevrolet	Niece Motorsports	44	Morgan Alexander	Tim Mooney 5 Matt Noyce 2 Cody Efaw 2 Wally Rogers 1 Matt Weber 1	1
Chevrolet	Niece Motorsports	44	Dean Thompson	Tim Mooney 5 Matt Noyce 2 Cody Efaw 2 Wally Rogers 1 Matt Weber 1	1
Chevrolet	Norm Benning Racing	6	Norm Benning	Ken Causey 4 Mark Tolbert 13; Charlie Langenstein 1	18
Chevrolet	Peck Motorsports	96	Todd Peck	Keith Wolfe	2
Chevrolet	Rackley W.A.R.	27	William Byron	Willie Allen	1
Chevrolet	Trey Hutchens Racing	14	Trey Hutchens	Bobby Hutchens Jr.	6
Chevrolet	NEMCO Motorsports	8	Camden Murphy	Gere Kennon Jr.	1
Ford	NEMCO Motorsports	8	Joe Nemechek	Gere Kennon Jr.	1
Ford	David Gilliland Racing	17	David Gilliland	Chad Johnston 10; Seth Smith 4	3
Ford	David Gilliland Racing	17	Riley Herbst	Chad Johnston 10; Seth Smith 4	1
Ford	David Gilliland Racing	17	Bill Lester	Chad Johnston 10; Seth Smith 4	1
Ford	David Gilliland Racing	17	Kevin Harvick	Chad Johnston 10; Seth Smith 4	1
Ford	David Gilliland Racing	17	Ryan Preece (R)	Chad Johnston 10; Seth Smith 4	2
Ford	David Gilliland Racing	17	Donny Schatz	Chad Johnston 10; Seth Smith 4	1
Ford	David Gilliland Racing	17	Taylor Gray	Chad Johnston 10; Seth Smith 4	5
Ford	DCC Racing	39	Ryan Newman	Frank Kerr	1
Ford	Roper Racing	04	Cory Roper	Shane Whitbeck	16
Ford	Roper Racing	04	Chase Briscoe	Shane Whitbeck	3
Toyota	Clay Greenfield Motorsports	68	Clay Greenfield	Jeff Hammond 1 Tucker Wingo 3	4
Toyota	Halmar Friesen Racing	62	Jessica Friesen	Adam Crigger 1 Tripp Bruce 1	2
Toyota	On Point Motorsports	31	Chris Hacker	Rick Markle	1
Toyota	ThorSport Racing	66	Paul Menard	Bud Haefele 5 Joe Shear Jr. 1	2
Toyota	ThorSport Racing	66	Ty Majeski	Bud Haefele 5 Joe Shear Jr. 1	4
Chevrolet 6 Toyota 5 Ford 6	CMI Motorsports	49	Ray Ciccarelli	Matt Cooper 9 Tim Silva 7	6
Chevrolet 6 Toyota 5 Ford 6	CMI Motorsports	49	Roger Reuse	Matt Cooper 9 Tim Silva 7	4 (Note: Entries were fielded in a collaboration with Jordan Anderson Racing.)
Chevrolet 6 Toyota 5 Ford 6	CMI Motorsports	49	Andrew Gordon	Matt Cooper 9 Tim Silva 7	2
Chevrolet 6 Toyota 5 Ford 6	CMI Motorsports	49	Ryan Reed	Matt Cooper 9 Tim Silva 7	2
Chevrolet 6 Toyota 5 Ford 6	CMI Motorsports	49	John Atwell	Matt Cooper 9 Tim Silva 7	1
Chevrolet 6 Toyota 5 Ford 6	CMI Motorsports	49	J. J. Yeley	Matt Cooper 9 Tim Silva 7	1
Chevrolet 6 Toyota 5 Ford 6	CMI Motorsports	49	Keith McGee	Matt Cooper 9 Tim Silva 7	1
Chevrolet 20 Toyota 1	Cram Racing Enterprises	41	Dawson Cram	Brian Keselowski 17; Kevin Cram 4	16
Chevrolet 20 Toyota 1	Cram Racing Enterprises	41	Cody Erickson	Brian Keselowski 17; Kevin Cram 4	2
Chevrolet 20 Toyota 1	Cram Racing Enterprises	41	Todd Peck (Note: Entry was fielded in a collaboration with Peck Motorsports.)	Brian Keselowski 17; Kevin Cram 4	1
Chevrolet 20 Toyota 1	Cram Racing Enterprises	41	Will Rodgers	Brian Keselowski 17; Kevin Cram 4	1
Chevrolet 20 Toyota 1	Cram Racing Enterprises	41	Keith McGee	Brian Keselowski 17; Kevin Cram 4	1
Chevrolet 11 Toyota 2	Henderson Motorsports	75	Parker Kligerman	Chris Carrier	12
Chevrolet 11 Toyota 2	Henderson Motorsports	75	Sam Mayer	Chris Carrier	1
Chevrolet 18 Toyota 2	Hill Motorsports	56	Gus Dean	Greg Ely 19; Patrick Magee 1	1
Chevrolet 18 Toyota 2	Hill Motorsports	56	Timmy Hill	Greg Ely 19; Patrick Magee 1	10
Chevrolet 18 Toyota 2	Hill Motorsports	56	Tyler Hill	Greg Ely 19; Patrick Magee 1	8
Chevrolet 18 Toyota 2	Hill Motorsports	56	Mike Marlar	Greg Ely 19; Patrick Magee 1	1
Chevrolet 9 Ford 12	Jennifer Jo Cobb Racing	10	Jennifer Jo Cobb	Danny Gill 2 Allen Chambers 10; Steve Kuykendall 3 Joe Majenski 5 Rick Lind 1	21
Toyota 13 Chevrolet 1	Spencer Davis Motorsports	11	Spencer Davis	Jerry Babb 1 Danny Gill 6 Melvin Burns Jr. 6	9
Toyota 13 Chevrolet 1	Spencer Davis Motorsports	11	Bubba Wallace (Note: Entry was fielded in a collaboration with Hattori Racing Enterprises.)	Jerry Babb 1 Danny Gill 6 Melvin Burns Jr. 6	1
Toyota 13 Chevrolet 1	Spencer Davis Motorsports	11	Camden Murphy	Jerry Babb 1 Danny Gill 6 Melvin Burns Jr. 6	1
Toyota 13 Chevrolet 1	Spencer Davis Motorsports	11	Clay Greenfield (Note: Entries were fielded in a collaboration with Clay Greenfield Motorsports.)	Jerry Babb 1 Danny Gill 6 Melvin Burns Jr. 6	2

=== Changes ===
==== Teams ====
- On June 10, 2020, Ray Ciccarelli announced that he would be closing down his CMI Motorsports team after the 2020 season as a result of him disagreeing with NASCAR's decision to ban the Confederate Battle Flag (related with Sir Lewis Hamilton's FIA End Racism campaign, since NASCAR is a member of the Automobile Competition Committee for the United States, the national sporting authority for motorsport (ASN) as authorised by the FIA), meaning his No. 49 and No. 83 trucks will not be returning in 2021. However, CMI hinted in a tweet on October 30 that they would return for the 2021 season in some capacity. The team would later announce that Tim Viens would run a full season in the No. 49 while the No. 83 would continue to run part-time with and a rotation of drivers, including Ciccarelli himself.
- On July 15, 2020, ARCA Menards Series team owner/driver Justin Carroll announced that his TC Motorsports team would run part-time in the Truck Series in 2021 after they purchased a race truck in the summer of 2020. The team's first race was going to come at the Daytona Road Course, but they later postponed their debut to Richmond (which they did not enter) with additional starts planned at Bristol in September (which they also did not enter) and Martinsville.
- On July 31, 2020, eventual 2020 ARCA Menards Series champion Bret Holmes told reporter Chris Knight that he was looking at debuting in the Truck Series for select races in 2021. On January 14, 2021, Holmes announced that he would be driving for his own team as it expands into the Truck Series. He and Sam Mayer will run partial schedules in the No. 32 truck. On March 6, 2021, it was revealed that the team had purchased the owner points of the No. 28 FDNY Racing truck, which attempted the season-opener at Daytona, in order to be more likely to qualify for races without qualifying if an entry list had over 40 trucks.
- On October 8, 2020, Trey Hutchens revealed that he and his team planned on expanding their part-time schedule to between 8 and 12 races in 2021, after previously attempting 5 and 3 races in 2020 and 2019, respectively.
- On November 13, 2020, it was announced that Lira Motorsports would be returning to the series for the first time since 2016, fielding a part-time entry for late model and NASCAR Roots driver Logan Misuraca. She and the team also announced that they would run part-time in the ARCA Menards Series in 2021. Misuraca revealed in an interview in April that her deal with Lira had fallen through. Soon after, she joined On Point Motorsports to potentially drive the No. 30 with Camping World sponsorship during Marcus Lemonis' efforts to get all trucks in each race sponsored. She filmed a video to try to get Camping World and Lemonis to sponsor her, but as of August 2021, no deal has been put together.
- On December 1, 2020, McAnally–Hilgemann Racing announced that they would field a truck at the season-finale at Phoenix that will be driven by one of the drivers who participated in their new Driver Academy Series. All of the drivers who win a race in that series will be put into a drawing, and the winner of that drawing will get to drive this truck in this one race. With Derek Kraus returning to the team's No. 19 in 2021, this entry for the team at Phoenix will be a second part-time McAnally truck.
- On December 18, 2020, driver Willie Allen and Rackley Roofing owner Curtis Sutton announced the formation of the team Rackley W.A.R., fielding the No. 25 full-time for Timothy Peters. On June 1, 2021, the team announced that Peters would be released and replaced with JR Motorsports Xfinity Series driver Josh Berry for the next three races. On June 3, Rackley W.A.R. announced that Hendrick Motorsports Cup Series driver William Byron would make his first Truck Series start since his seven-win full season in the series in 2016, driving a part-time second truck, the No. 27, for the team.
- On January 13, 2021, it was announced that Hattori Racing Enterprises would be adding a part-time second truck in 2021 for Max McLaughlin. The races that it will be entered in and its number have yet to be announced. McLaughlin, the son of retired NASCAR driver Mike McLaughlin, ran full-time for the team in their ARCA Menards Series East No. 1 car in 2019 and 2020, but will not return to that ride in 2021 in order to concentrate on his dirt racing efforts. Max has one prior Truck start, which came in the 2018 Eldora Dirt Derby for Niece Motorsports.
- On January 14, 2021, it was announced that Win-Tron Racing would merge into AM Racing, a Truck Series team that they have had an alliance with for multiple years and that they have shared a race shop with beginning in 2020.
- On January 22, 2021, Spencer Davis announced that he and his team would be running the full season in 2021, after previously running part-time in 2020. After failing to qualify for the season-opener at Daytona, they did not attempt the next two races (the Daytona Road Course and Las Vegas). The team returned in the next race at Atlanta, as it was announced on March 20 that Davis had acquired the owner points of the No. 8 NEMCO Motorsports truck, which would allow his team to run the entire season since the No. 8 had attempted the first two races of the season. On March 18, the team announced that full-time Cup Series driver and 2014 Eldora Dirt Derby winner Bubba Wallace would return to the Truck Series to drive their No. 11 in the Bristol dirt race, which would be fielded in a collaboration with Hattori Racing Enterprises for this race.
- On January 29, 2021, it was announced that Young's Motorsports would expand back up to three full-time trucks in 2021 with the re-addition of the No. 12, which was driven by Tate Fogleman, who drove the team's No. 02 in 2021, which will now be driven by Kris Wright.
- On March 6, 2021, it was revealed that Henderson Motorsports had purchased the owner points of Clay Greenfield's No. 68 truck, which ran nearly the full season in 2020, to use for their No. 75 truck for the rest of the season.
- On March 17, 2021, Ryan Newman revealed that he would be entering the Bristol dirt race with a new team, DCC Racing, owned by Brad Means. The team used the No. 39, Newman's number when he drove for Stewart–Haas Racing in the Cup Series, and was a Ford, the manufacturer Newman drives in the Cup Series with Roush Fenway Racing. Brad Means is the son of Jimmy Means, the team owner of Xfinity Series team Jimmy Means Racing. On August 27, 2021, it was announced that DCC would be partnering with Reaume Brothers Racing to jointly field Dylan Lupton in the No. 34 RBR truck for the last four races of the season.

==== Drivers ====
- On August 28, 2020, it was announced that Chris Hacker would be joining Cram Racing Enterprises, starting with one ARCA start in 2020 (which ended up being the West Series season-finale at Phoenix), which would be followed by the 2021 ARCA season-opener at Daytona, and then either a part-time or full-time schedule in the Truck Series, depending on sponsorship. On June 1, 2021, Hacker tweeted that he would be driving Cram's No. 41 truck at Nashville, although the team later refuted that statement hours later. On June 2, CRE and Hacker parted ways, supposedly over the team's frustration of Hacker "announcing" his start prematurely. On August 16, 2021, it was announced that Hacker would make his Truck Series debut at Gateway in the No. 34 for Reaume Brothers Racing in a partnership with On Point Motorsports.
- On September 24, 2020, it was announced that Carson Hocevar, who drove part-time in the Nos. 40 and 42 for Niece Motorsports in 2020, would return to the team in 2021 to run full-time and for Rookie of the Year in the No. 42 truck.
- On September 27, 2020, it was announced that West Series driver Keith McGee would drive for Reaume Brothers Racing at some point during the 2021 season. He was scheduled to run the race at Talladega in the team's No. 33 truck in 2020, but was not approved to make his debut due to his lack of superspeedway experience coupled with how there was no practice and qualifying due to COVID-19. As a result, the team announced his first start with them would be pushed back a year. On January 18, 2021, Reaume announced that McGee's first race would be at Richmond in the No. 33. In addition, the team stated that he could run more races in 2021 if sponsorship could be found.
- On October 17, 2020, Ford Performance announced that Hailie Deegan would run full-time and for Rookie of the Year in a DGR-Crosley truck in 2021. She drove for the team full-time in the ARCA Menards Series in 2020 along with making one Truck Series start.
- On October 29, 2020, Frontstretch reporter Kevin Rutherford revealed that Howie DiSavino III had told him that he would make his Truck Series debut in 2021. Before COVID-19 hit, DiSavino III had planned on doing so in 2020 in the race at Richmond in a No. 32 truck for Win-Tron Racing. On April 5, it was announced that DiSavino's first race would still come at Richmond, but it would be in the No. 3 for Jordan Anderson Racing.
- On November 10, 2020, NASCAR issued an indefinite suspension to Josh Reaume for an allegedly antisemitic post on social media that violated Sections 12.1 and 12.8.1.e in the NASCAR Rule Book. Reaume was reinstated by NASCAR on March 31, 2021.
- On November 12, 2020, it was announced that Brett Moffitt would move up to the Xfinity Series full-time in 2021, driving the Our Motorsports No. 02 car which he drove in many races in 2020 and leaving his full-time Truck Series ride in the No. 23 for GMS Racing. The following day, GMS announced that Chase Purdy would be a full-time driver for the team, replacing Moffitt, with the truck crew chief to be determined. Purdy drove part-time in the team's No. 24 in 2020. On August 5, 2021, Purdy tested positive for COVID-19, forcing him to miss Watkins Glen while A. J. Allmendinger substituted for him.
- On November 19, 2020, it was revealed that pending the signing of contracts, Tim Viens would drive full-time in the No. 49 for CMI Motorsports in 2021, after having entered a majority of the races in 2020 for the team in either the No. 49 or No. 83 truck. Viens later ended up driving the No. 83 instead of the No. 49.
- On November 23, 2020, it was announced that John Hunter Nemechek would return to the Truck Series full-time in 2021 to drive the Kyle Busch Motorsports No. 4, replacing Raphaël Lessard. Nemechek drove the Front Row Motorsports No. 38 in the Cup Series in 2020 as well as a part-time schedule in the No. 8 for his family team, NEMCO Motorsports.
- On November 24, 2020, Ryan Truex, who ran part-time in the No. 40 for Niece Motorsports in 2020, announced that he would return for a full-time season in the same truck in 2021.
- On November 25, 2020, it was announced that Raphaël Lessard would drive in the No. 24 for 12 races for GMS Racing, with the possibility of a full season if sponsorship could be found. Lessard ran full-time in the No. 4 for Kyle Busch Motorsports in 2020. On January 7, 2021, GMS announced that Lessard would be able to run the full season after the team found additional sponsorship. However, on April 3, it was announced that sponsorship had dried up again and Lessard would be taken out of the truck.
- On December 2, 2020, Moffitt surprisingly announced that he would return to the Truck Series full-time, driving the Niece Motorsports No. 45, meaning that he will run full-time in both the Xfinity and Truck Series in 2021.
- On December 7, 2020, Kyle Busch Motorsports announced that Chandler Smith, who drove the Nos. 46 and 51 part-time for them for the previous two seasons, would replace Christian Eckes in the No. 18 in 2021 in his first full season in the Truck Series. Smith also competed part-time in the ARCA Menards Series for the previous three seasons with Venturini Motorsports, winning a total of nine races.
- On December 31, 2020, it was announced that Kris Wright would drive full-time for Young's Motorsports after driving part-time for GMS Racing in the 2020 ARCA Menards Series and a one-off truck race at the Daytona road course. He also drove part-time for JP Racing in the 2020 ARCA Menards Series West. Wright would later miss the Atlanta race and the Bristol dirt race after testing positive for COVID-19. JR Motorsports Xfinity Series driver Josh Berry substituted for Wright at Atlanta, and Trackhouse Cup Series driver Daniel Suárez substituted for Wright in the Bristol dirt race.
- On January 17, 2021, it was announced that Sam Mayer would drive the No. 75 for Henderson Motorsports in seven races, beginning at the Daytona Road Course, in addition to his part-time schedule in the No. 32 for Bret Holmes Racing. The rest of his schedule with Henderson has yet to be announced.
- On February 4, 2021, ThorSport Racing announced that Christian Eckes would drive 10 races in the No. 98 truck, sharing the ride with Grant Enfinger throughout the season.
- On February 15, 2021, Kyle Busch Motorsports announced that road course ringer Parker Chase would be in their No. 51 for the Daytona Road Course and Circuit of the Americas. Chase was Kyle Busch's teammate in the 2020 Rolex 24 and he made his stock car debut in the ARCA Menards Series race at the DRC in 2020.
- On February 26, 2021, Bill Lester announced on NASCAR Race Hub that he would be coming out of retirement to compete in the Truck Series race at his home track of Atlanta. He previously competed full-time in the series from 2002 to midway through 2007. On March 12, it was announced that Lester would drive the No. 17 for David Gilliland Racing.
- On March 4, 2021, Roper Racing announced that full-time Cup Series driver and accomplished dirt racer Chase Briscoe would return to the Truck Series to drive the No. 04 for the team in the Bristol dirt race, replacing team owner/driver Cory Roper in the truck. It was then announced on April 26 that Briscoe would also make a start on pavement for the team at Kansas.
- On March 15, 2021, Hill Motorsports announced that 2018 World of Outlaws Late Model Series champion Mike Marlar would drive their No. 56 in the Bristol dirt race. This will be his second start in the series after his debut at Eldora in 2019, where he finished fourth in the No. 33 for Reaume Brothers Racing.
- On March 17, 2021, Niece Motorsports announced that full-time Cup Series driver and accomplished dirt racer Kyle Larson would return to the Truck Series to drive the No. 44 for the team in the Bristol dirt race. This will also be his first start in the series since returning from his suspension in 2020.
- On April 8, 2021, Taylor Gray was forced to miss his first race at Richmond after suffering a fractured L4 vertebra, left foot, and ankle in a single-car accident in Statesville, NC. On July 6, David Gilliland Racing announced that he had recovered and would make his Truck Series debut at Watkins Glen.
- On April 14, 2021, CMI Motorsports announced that Ryan Reed would drive their No. 49 in the race at Richmond, which they were able to qualify for. This was Reed's first start in the Truck Series and in NASCAR since 2019 when he drove the DGR No. 17 at Las Vegas and only his second start since losing his full-time Xfinity Series ride with Roush Fenway Racing. He has worked as a driver coach during his time without a ride. Reed would then return to the truck in the next race at Kansas. On April 3, it was announced that Reed would replace Raphaël Lessard in the No. 24 for GMS Racing at Darlington due to the lack of funding for Lessard to remain in the truck full-time.
- On April 19, 2021, Kyle Busch revealed in an interview that Corey Heim would make his Truck Series debut for his team at Darlington in the No. 51. Heim, a Toyota development driver, competes full-time in the ARCA Menards Series for Venturini Motorsports. He will also be in the truck at Martinsville.
- On April 21, 2021, C. J. McLaughlin revealed on an appearance on a podcast that he would drive for Reaume Brothers Racing in five races, which would include Kansas and Charlotte in the No. 34. McLaughlin previously drove for the team in the race at Iowa in 2019.
- On July 28, 2021, it was announced that ARCA Menards Series driver Toni Breidinger, who was scheduled to make her Truck Series debut at some point in 2021 in a part-time fourth Young's Motorsports truck, the No. 82, would be leaving the team to drive for Venturini Motorsports, the team she drove for part-time in ARCA in 2018.
- On September 10, 2021, Jordan Anderson Racing announced that Sage Karam would make his Truck Series debut in their No. 3 truck. The IndyCar driver made his NASCAR debut in the team's No. 31 car in the Xfinity Series race at the Indianapolis Motor Speedway road course.
- On October 18, 2021, it was announced that ARCA Menards Series West driver Dean Thompson would make his Truck Series debut in the season-finale at Phoenix. He also drove for the team in the main ARCA Menards Series season-finale at Kansas.

==== Crew chiefs ====
- On October 26, 2020, it was announced that Kyle Busch Motorsports crew chief Rudy Fugle, who won 28 races, two drivers' championships and five owners' championships in the Truck Series, would become the crew chief for William Byron (who he worked with in 2016) in the Cup Series for Hendrick Motorsports in 2021 after the retirement of Chad Knaus.
- On November 25, 2020, it was announced that Mike Hillman Jr. would join DGR-Crosley to be Hailie Deegan's crew chief in 2021. He previously worked for Kyle Busch Motorsports, serving as Raphaël Lessard's crew chief on the No. 4 truck in 2020.
- On December 8, 2020, Kyle Busch Motorsports announced changes to their crew chief lineup in 2021.
  - Eric Phillips, who was a crew chief for KBM from 2010 to 2014, would return to the team to be the crew chief of the No. 4, now driven by John Hunter Nemechek, replacing Mike Hillman Jr, who left to crew chief Hailie Deegan at DGR-Crosley. Phillips was previously the car chief for Denny Hamlin's No. 11 Joe Gibbs Racing Cup Series team and prior to that, the crew chief of JGR's No. 18 Xfinity Series team.
  - Danny Stockman Jr. will move from the No. 51 to the No. 18, now driven by Chandler Smith (who he previously worked with part-time in the No. 51), replacing Rudy Fugle, who left to crew chief the No. 24 of William Byron for Hendrick Motorsports in the Cup Series.
  - Mardy Lindley, a four-time East Series championship-winning crew chief (including the last two years with Sam Mayer at GMS Racing), replaces Stockman as the crew chief of the No. 51.
- On December 10, 2020, it was announced that Kevin Bellicourt, who crew chiefed the No. 19 of Derek Kraus for McAnally–Hilgemann Racing in 2020, would be joining Spire Motorsports to crew chief their No. 77 car in the NASCAR Cup Series. He is the 2015 East Series championship-winning crew chief.
- On December 22, 2020, Matt Noyce, who was the crew chief for the No. 99 of Ben Rhodes at ThorSport Racing for the last two years, and prior to that was the crew chief of Jesse Little's No. 97 team, was announced to be moving to McAnally-Hilgemann to replace Bellicourt as the crew chief for the No. 19 of Kraus. On April 1, 2021, McAnally-Hilgemann announced that Noyce had left the team and would be replaced by former MBM Motorsports Xfinity Series crew chief Mark Hillman. Noyce would move to Niece Motorsports, where he replaced Tim Mooney as crew chief of their No. 44 truck.
- On February 4, 2021, ThorSport Racing announced that Jeriod Prince would be the new crew chief for the No. 98 truck of Enfinger and Eckes. He has crew chiefed for the team in the past on the No. 13 truck in 2013 and 2014 and on the team's former ARCA car, the No. 44 of Frank Kimmel, in 2012 and 2013. They also announced that the crew chief for the No. 99 truck of Rhodes would be Rich Lushes, who was the crew chief of ThorSport's No. 13 in 2018 when it was driven by Myatt Snider. Both Prince and Lushes had been truck chiefs after the years they were crew chiefs for ThorSport.
- On April 30, 2021, it was announced that Shane Wilson had been released as crew chief of the No. 15 truck of Tanner Gray for David Gilliland Racing. Seth Smith, who is one of the crew chiefs of DGR's part-time No. 17 truck, became the interim crew chief for the No. 15 starting at Kansas.
- On May 4, 2021, it was revealed that Niece Motorsports would be making changes to their crew chief lineup beginning at Darlington. Phil Gould, who was the crew chief for the No. 45, moves to the No. 42 of Carson Hocevar. The previous crew chief of the No. 42, Cody Efaw, moved to the No. 44, replacing Matt Noyce, who replaced Gould as the crew chief of the No. 45.
- On May 28, 2021, it was revealed that Jon Leonard would be replacing Tripp Bruce as Stewart Friesen's crew chief. Leonard was an engineer for the team and previously a crew chief for Todd Gilliland and Front Row Motorsports in the Truck Series and an engineer and interim crew chief with Leavine Family Racing in the Cup Series. Bruce is also the team's competition director and moved to that role full-time after Leonard's promotion to crew chief.

==== Interim crew chiefs ====
- Danny Stockman Jr. was the crew chief of the No. 51 Kyle Busch Motorsports truck in 2020 and was suspended for three races after the truck had a loose wheel during one of their pit stops in the SpeedyCash.com 400 at Texas on October 25, 2020. Because there were only two races left in the season, the third race of his suspension came at the 2021 season-opener at Daytona. Wes Ward was the interim crew chief at Martinsville and Phoenix in 2020. Stockman moved from the No. 51 to the No. 18 truck for KBM in 2021. 1992 Cup Series champion crew chief Paul Andrews, who joined KBM as their new shop foreman for 2021 after previously being a crew chief for the closed Chad Bryant Racing team in the ARCA Menards Series, filled in for Stockman at Daytona.
- On March 15, 2021, it was announced that Patrick Magee, a crew chief for MBM Motorsports in the Xfinity Series, would substitute for Greg Ely as the crew chief for the No. 56 Hill Motorsports truck at the Bristol dirt race because Ely had an illness. Magee was available with the Xfinity Series off that weekend. The driver of that truck for that race was Mike Marlar, who also was driving MBM's No. 66 in the Cup Series Bristol dirt race, a car usually driven by Hill Motorsports driver/co-owner Timmy Hill.
- On June 18, 2021, David Gilliland Racing's No. 15 truck, driven by Tanner Gray, and the DGR-aligned No. 38 Front Row Motorsports truck, driven by Todd Gilliland, both failed pre-qualifying inspection before the race at Nashville. Crew chiefs Seth Smith and Chris Lawson were ejected from the track and replaced by interim crew chiefs Jacob Hampton (the engineer for Gray's No. 15) and David Gilliland (DGR owner, part-time driver, and father of Todd Gilliland).
- On October 6, 2021, NASCAR indefinitely suspended Young's Motorsports No. 2 crew chief Eddie Troconis for violation of Sections 12.8.1.c Behavioral.

==== Manufacturers ====
- On January 8, 2021, Ray Ciccarelli revealed that he would be upgrading the equipment for CMI Motorsports ahead of the 2021 season. Over the offseason, he bought a Ford from ThorSport Racing (which switched manufacturers for 2021) as well as a Toyota from another team which was not specified. In turn, he then sold some of his old Chevy trucks. CMI now has trucks from all three manufacturers in their fleet, which Ciccarelli stated is in order to attract part-time drivers to the team that have a contract with one of the manufacturers.
- On January 18, 2021, ThorSport Racing announced that Ford would not be their manufacturer in 2021. On February 4, the team announced that they would be switching back to Toyota, which was their manufacturer from 2012 to 2017.

== Rule changes ==
- NASCAR has increased the field count of the Truck Series to 36 trucks per race, which was the same field count of the series until the 2014 season. In the races without practice or qualifying, the field count will be expanded to a maximum of 40 vehicles, similar to 2020 due to the COVID-19 pandemic.

== Schedule ==
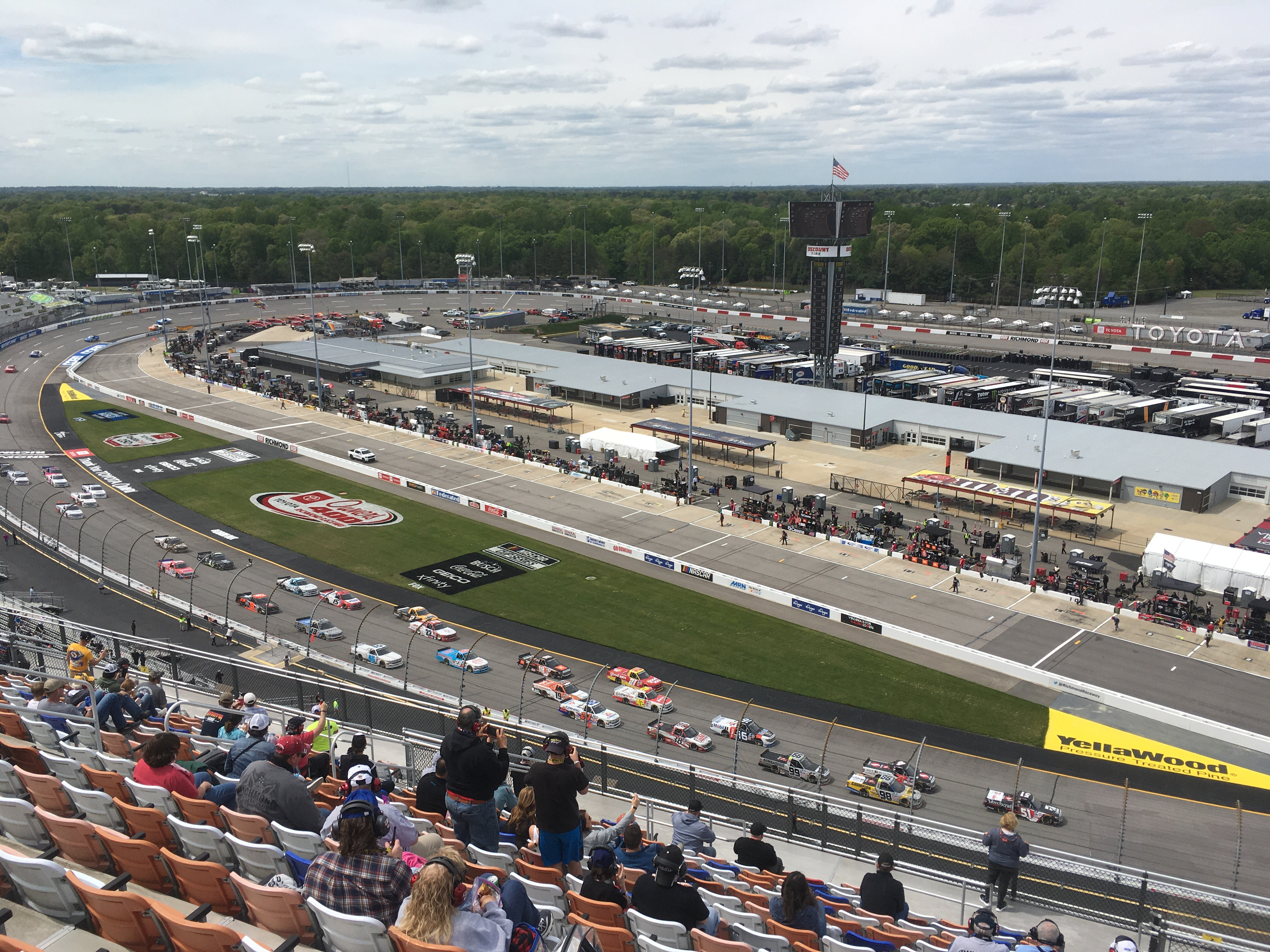
The ToyotaCare 250 at Richmond Raceway in April

Daytona, Phoenix, Texas, Circuit of the Americas, and Gateway revealed their race dates ahead of the release of the entire schedule, which NASCAR announced on November 19, 2020. The schedule has since been adjusted twice, with the most recent changes announced on May 25, 2021.

Note: The Triple Truck Challenge races are listed in bold.

No	Race title	Track	Location	Date
1	NextEra Energy 250	Daytona International Speedway	Daytona Beach, Florida	February 12
2	BrakeBest Select 159	Daytona International Speedway (Road Course)	Daytona Beach, Florida	February 19
3	Bucked Up 200	Las Vegas Motor Speedway	Las Vegas, Nevada	March 5
4	Fr8Auctions 200	Atlanta Motor Speedway	Hampton, Georgia	March 20
5	Pinty's Dirt Truck Race	Bristol Motor Speedway (Dirt Course)	Bristol, Tennessee	March 29
6	ToyotaCare 250	Richmond Raceway, Richmond, Virginia	Richmond, Virginia	April 17
7	WISE Power 200	Kansas Speedway	Kansas City, Kansas	May 1
8	**LiftKits4Less.com 200**	Darlington Raceway	Darlington, South Carolina	May 7
9	**Toyota Tundra 225**	Circuit of the Americas	Austin, Texas	May 22
10	**North Carolina Education Lottery 200**	Charlotte Motor Speedway	Concord, North Carolina	May 28
11	SpeedyCash.com 220	Texas Motor Speedway	Fort Worth, Texas	June 12
12	Rackley Roofing 200	Nashville Superspeedway	Lebanon, Tennessee	June 18
13	CRC Brakleen 150	Pocono Raceway	Long Pond, Pennsylvania	June 26
14	Corn Belt 150 presented by Premier Chevy Dealers	Knoxville Raceway	Knoxville, Iowa	July 9
15	United Rentals 176 at The Glen	Watkins Glen International	Watkins Glen, New York	August 7
NASCAR Camping World Truck Series Playoffs
Round of 10
16	Toyota 200 presented by CK Power	World Wide Technology Raceway	Madison, Illinois	August 20
17	In It To Win It 200 presented by the South Carolina Education Lottery	Darlington Raceway	Darlington, South Carolina	September 5
18	UNOH 200 presented by Ohio Logistics	Bristol Motor Speedway	Bristol, Tennessee	September 16
Round of 8
19	Victoria's Voice Foundation 200	Las Vegas Motor Speedway	Las Vegas, Nevada	September 24
20	Chevrolet Silverado 250	Talladega Superspeedway	Lincoln, Alabama	October 2
21	United Rentals 200	Martinsville Speedway	Ridgeway, Virginia	October 30
Championship 4
22	Lucas Oil 150	Phoenix Raceway	Phoenix, Arizona	November 5

=== Broadcasting ===
Fox aired the entirety of the schedule in 2021, as their contract TV deal goes through 2024.

Fox made a change to their broadcasting lineup for their Truck Series coverage for the 2021 season, as pit reporter Alan Cavanna was released by the network ahead of the season.

=== Schedule changes ===
There is one less race on the schedule, as it now contains 22 races instead of 23. This is also the first time since 2000 that the Truck Series has had more than one road course race (when Watkins Glen and Portland International Raceway were on the schedule). The original schedule had three road course races, the most since 1999 (when it had those two races plus Topeka). The current schedule features three such events (Daytona road course, Austin, Watkins Glen).

- Eldora Speedway, the series' original dirt race which had been on the schedule since 2013 (except for 2020 when it was removed due to COVID-19), was replaced by a race at Knoxville Raceway in Iowa, home of the Knoxville Nationals, which will be run on Friday, July 9.
- The series has two dirt races for the first time with the addition of a spring race at Bristol, which will see dirt temporarily put onto the track's surface. The Cup Series will also be running with the Truck Series on that weekend. This race replaces the race at Kentucky Speedway, which will not host any NASCAR races in 2021.
- Circuit of the Americas replaces the INDYCAR weekend race at Texas (which was run at the playoff weekend for Cup last year because of the pandemic). This gives the series a second road course race.
- After a 21 year absence, Watkins Glen returns to the schedule for the first time since 2000, giving the series a third road course race. The race will be in August on the same weekend as the Cup and Xfinity races there. This race replaces the race at Michigan, which will not host a Truck race for the first time since 2001 because of logistics.
- Nashville Superspeedway is added to the schedule, replacing Dover, as is also the case with the Cup and Xfinity Series. This is the first race for the series at Nashville since 2011. The series will not race at Dover at all this season. It is the first time since 1999 where the track has not been on the schedule.
- Iowa Speedway is permanently taken off the schedule after its race on the 2020 schedule was removed as part of the COVID-19 schedule changes.
- Darlington Raceway, which was not originally on the 2020 schedule but added on as part of the COVID-19 schedule changes, becomes a permanent event for the first time since 2011. The race moves from Labor Day weekend to May as part of the new second Cup and Xfinity Series races at the track on Mother's Day weekend in May, as the annual throwback weekend moves from Darlington's Cup Playoff weekend to the spring weekend for 2021.
- Canadian Tire Motorsport Park was scheduled to return to the schedule after being taken off of the 2020 schedule during the season as part of the COVID-19 schedule changes. CTMP was to be the Truck race run on Labor Day weekend, its usual spot on the schedule, with Darlington, (which was on that weekend in 2020) moving to May.

=== Schedule changes due to the COVID-19 pandemic ===
- Due to state COVID regulations in California, NASCAR cancelled the Cup and Xfinity races at Auto Club Speedway, scheduled for February 27 and 28, and those races were moved to the Daytona infield road course (the Truck Series did not have a race scheduled at Auto Club this season). With the season-opening races for all three series at Daytona being two weeks before, NASCAR made the Daytona Road Course the second race of the season for all three series, bumping the Homestead races back by one week to where Auto Club had been, along with cancelling the Truck Series race at Homestead and moving it to the Daytona Road Course for financial and logistics reasons (NASCAR could keep timing and scoring equipment at the circuit an additional week instead of setting it up and taking it down for two trips to Daytona within three weeks).
- Due to COVID-19 restrictions in terms of international travel, the race at Canadian Tire Motorsport Park was removed again and replaced by a second race at Darlington Raceway. The second Darlington date will be held on Sunday afternoon before the Cup Series Cook Out Southern 500 that evening.

== Results and standings ==
=== Race results ===
No.	Race	Pole position	Most laps led	Winning driver	Manufacturer	No.	Winning team	Report
1	NextEra Energy 250	Johnny Sauter	Chandler Smith	Ben Rhodes	Toyota	99	ThorSport Racing	Report
2	BrakeBest Select 159	Ben Rhodes	Sheldon Creed	Ben Rhodes	Toyota	99	ThorSport Racing	Report
3	Bucked Up 200	Ben Rhodes	John Hunter Nemechek	John Hunter Nemechek	Toyota	4	Kyle Busch Motorsports	Report
4	Fr8Auctions 200	John Hunter Nemechek	Kyle Busch	Kyle Busch	Toyota	51	Kyle Busch Motorsports	Report
5	Pinty's Dirt Truck Race	John Hunter Nemechek	Martin Truex Jr.	Martin Truex Jr.	Toyota	51	Kyle Busch Motorsports	Report
6	ToyotaCare 250	Ben Rhodes	John Hunter Nemechek	John Hunter Nemechek	Toyota	4	Kyle Busch Motorsports	Report
7	WISE Power 200	John Hunter Nemechek	Kyle Busch	Kyle Busch	Toyota	51	Kyle Busch Motorsports	Report
8	LiftKits4Less.com 200	John Hunter Nemechek	John Hunter Nemechek	Sheldon Creed	Chevrolet	2	GMS Racing	Report
9	Toyota Tundra 225	Tyler Ankrum	Sheldon Creed	Todd Gilliland	Ford	38	Front Row Motorsports	Report
10	North Carolina Education Lottery 200	Todd Gilliland	John Hunter Nemechek	John Hunter Nemechek	Toyota	4	Kyle Busch Motorsports	Report
11	SpeedyCash.com 220	John Hunter Nemechek	John Hunter Nemechek	John Hunter Nemechek	Toyota	4	Kyle Busch Motorsports	Report
12	Rackley Roofing 200	Derek Kraus	Derek Kraus; Chandler Smith (Note: Kraus and Smith both led 48 laps.)	Ryan Preece	Ford	17	David Gilliland Racing	Report
13	CRC Brakleen 150	Todd Gilliland	Kyle Busch	John Hunter Nemechek	Toyota	4	Kyle Busch Motorsports	Report
14	Corn Belt 150	Derek Kraus	Chandler Smith	Austin Hill	Toyota	16	Hattori Racing Enterprises	Report
15	United Rentals 176 at The Glen	Austin Hill	Austin Hill	Austin Hill	Toyota	16	Hattori Racing Enterprises	Report
NASCAR Camping World Truck Series Playoffs
Round of 10
16	Toyota 200 presented by CK Power	Austin Hill	Sheldon Creed	Sheldon Creed	Chevrolet	2	GMS Racing	Report
17	In It To Win It 200	Sheldon Creed	Sheldon Creed	Sheldon Creed	Chevrolet	2	GMS Racing	Report
18	UNOH 200	Sheldon Creed	Sheldon Creed	Chandler Smith	Toyota	18	Kyle Busch Motorsports	Report
Round of 8
19	Victoria's Voice Foundation 200	John Hunter Nemechek	Todd Gilliland	Christian Eckes	Toyota	98	ThorSport Racing	Report
20	Chevrolet Silverado 250	Ben Rhodes	Todd Gilliland	Tate Fogleman	Chevrolet	12	Young's Motorsports	Report
21	United Rentals 200	John Hunter Nemechek	Todd Gilliland	Zane Smith	Chevrolet	21	GMS Racing	Report
Championship 4
22	Lucas Oil 150	Chandler Smith	Sheldon Creed	Chandler Smith	Toyota	18	Kyle Busch Motorsports	Report

=== Drivers' championship ===
(key) Bold – Pole position awarded by time. Italics – Pole position set by competition-based formula. * – Most laps led. ^{1} – Stage 1 winner. ^{2} – Stage 2 winner. ^{1-10} – Regular season top 10 finishers.
. – Eliminated after Round of 10 . – Eliminated after Round of 8

Pos.	Driver	DAY	DRC	LVS	ATL	BRD	RCH	KAN	DAR	COA	CLT	TEX	NSH	POC	KNX	GLN	GTW	DAR	BRI	LVS	TAL	MAR	PHO	Pts.	Stage	Bonus
1	Ben Rhodes	1	1	10	16	2	7	10	2	10^{2}	3	26	7	17	7	15	3	34	9	2	13^{1}	7	3	4034	–	19^{3}
2	Zane Smith	16	40	6	6	7	14	7	16	8	10^{2}	6^{2}	4	8^{1}	14	6	35	9	8	29	33	1	5	4032	–	9^{5}
3	John Hunter Nemechek	7^{2}	3^{1}	1*^{1}	3^{12}	39	1*^{2}	5	8*^{2}	12	1*	1*^{1}	10	1^{2}	11	2	22	2^{1}	3	33^{1}	4	39	7	4030	–	51^{1}
4	Matt Crafton	15	6	5	8	14	18	24	4	15	30	20	6	6	6	22	2	10	7	3	14	5	12	4025	–	4^{7}
NASCAR Camping World Truck Series Playoffs cut-off
Pos.	Driver	DAY	DRC	LVS	ATL	BRD	RCH	KAN	DAR	COA	CLT	TEX	NSH	POC	KNX	GLN	GTW	DAR	BRI	LVS	TAL	MAR	PHO	Pts.	Stage	Bonus
5	Sheldon Creed	6	2*	18	5	16	11	32	1	5*	35^{1}	35	14	3	35	3	1*^{12}	1*^{2}	19*^{12}	36	12^{2}	9	4*	2325	57	26^{6}
6	Stewart Friesen	32	11	4	10	12	13	14	25	17	4	34	5	33	27	20	4	3	4	6	22	17	2	2275	41	1^{10}
7	Todd Gilliland	31	4	13	17	4	6	6	15^{1}	1^{1}	5	7	2	7	4	4^{1}	29	4	10	5*^{2}	3*	25*^{12}	8	2262	72	15^{4}
8	Chandler Smith **(R)**	9*	12	19	35	34	4	11	27	33	6	5	13*^{2}	25	2*	40	28	7	1	35	19	4	**1**^{12}	2230	34	6
9	Austin Hill	22	33	3	2	9	10	3	13	9	9	4	9	5	1	1*^{2}	23	12	24	10	32	2	10	2210	43	21^{2}
10	Carson Hocevar **(R)**	5	14	24	12	21	12	23	3	7	2	11	16	13	16	10	8	11	6	22	25	12	9	2204	19	2^{9}
11	Grant Enfinger	11		7	11	6	8^{1}	17	5	4	14	3	3	36	3	38	25	6	2	7	21	21	13	589	72	1^{8}
12	Johnny Sauter	**27**	18	15	4	32	5	9	6	22	31	12	12	35	20	23	5	8	5	4	30	31	11	505	56	–
13	Derek Kraus	33	7	32	13	38	15	28	35	21	8	13	**35***^{1}	10	**5**^{12}	21	20	16	13	12	20	24	15	480	98	3
14	Austin Wayne Self	21	15	14	23	10	19	16	9	16	17	15	27	19	30	16	9	14	14	8	29	20	26	447	20	–
15	Tyler Ankrum	28	21	34	18	40	3	15	14	**3**	16	8	23	4	17	7	32	18	32	34	28	26	14	432	49	–
16	Ryan Truex	4	31	38	15	20	40	20	11	20	12	16	26	18	13	17	13	33	16	9	5	33	19	404	13	–
17	Hailie Deegan **(R)**	24	28	28	21	19	17	13	20	14	13	24	21	26	21	19	7	29	25	31	24	19	17	360	6	–
18	Tanner Gray	35	20	12	19	13	24	18	33	31	22	9	18	16	31	14	19	24	38	23	34	3	35	323	23	–
19	Chase Purdy **(R)**	29	22	23	24	18	28	25	36	27	34	17	15	15	33		6	15	30	13	9	40	16	311	5	–
20	Tate Fogleman	30	19	20	26	23	39	36	30	25	37	25	20	21	9	26	14	38	37	14	1	18	34	283	–	–
21	Christian Eckes		10	9				4		35	11			12		13	31			1			6	263	21	5
22	Danny Bohn	17	30	17	28	36	20	26	18		24		30	38	10	28	36	20	33	18	8	14	28	263	–	–
23	Parker Kligerman	DNQ		8	14	8			26	13			17			5		5	21		37	6		254	6	–
24	Spencer Boyd	13	39	22	33	25	27	35	22	DNQ	26	27	DNQ	27		33	16	21	31	19	7	15	31	237	–	–
25	Cory Roper	3	34	36	27		31		40	30	25	18	31				17		20	28	6	37	30	184	–	–
26	Kris Wright **(R)**	12		25			35	33	39		23	22	32	30			18	28	36	16	36	13	32	166	1	–
27	Timmy Hill		9^{†}				21^{†}	22	7	24	18		29			24			17			10		151	6	–
28	Raphaël Lessard	23^{1}	26^{2}	30	39	3	23	8																150	40	2
29	Jack Wood									28	15		11	39	39	25	10	30		30	40	27	20	150	10	–
30	Dawson Cram	DNQ	17	21	31		25	31	31	DNQ	21	21	28				30	23	35			23	DNQ	144	–	–
31	Tyler Hill			35								19		24			11	32		17	2		33	123	–	–
32	Timothy Peters	26	24	16	30	30	22	21	19	32	38													119	5	–
33	Spencer Davis	DNQ			20		16	29	29				25				Wth	22		15		29		111	–	–
34	Ty Majeski										7		8	14			33							109	23	–
35	Jennifer Jo Cobb	18	35	29	38	33	38	37	24	DNQ	33	31	Wth	31	25	36	38	36	27	27	31	36	DNQ	107	–	–
36	Drew Dollar	10									20	33	24						34	24	35		18	102	4	–
37	Codie Rohrbaugh	8	16		29	27	36		38						34						16			94	–	–
38	Bret Holmes			37	32			27			36		DNQ							11	15	22		81	1	–
39	Jordan Anderson	2^{‡}		27^{‡}	25^{‡}			30^{‡}	10								37	26			11		23	79	–	–
40	Taylor Gray															35	12		29			8	29	76	4	–
41	Kaz Grala		8^{§}							2						12								74	14	–
42	Corey Heim								23							18						11		71	12	–
43	Norm Benning	DNQ	32	33	40	37	32	39	37			30		32	19	37	Wth	35	DNQ		17	DNQ	DNQ	71	–	–
44	Lawless Alan		36							23			34	20		32		27	18		38		36	71	–	–
45	Paul Menard									11						8								59	4	–
46	Keith McGee						30				29	29	DNQ							32	10			55	–	–
47	Howie DiSavino III						34					23		22					28	26				52	–	–
48	Bayley Currey							12^{±}	21	26	19			37										50	4	–
49	Clay Greenfield	DNQ											DNQ				DNQ	19	23		23			46	–	–
50	Camden Murphy		13							19														43	1	–
51	David Gilliland	14		39					28															43	10	–
52	Chris Hacker																27			37		16	27	42	–	–
53	Jake Griffin					29									12		34							36	–	–
54	Brennan Poole											14												35	12	–
55	Josh Reaume						33						DNQ	28		31		25	40			34		35	–	–
56	Ryan Reed						29	40	12															34	–	–
57	Parker Chase		23							18														33	–	–
58	Willie Allen																				18		24	32	–	–
59	Brian Brown														8									29	–	–
60	Jason White	20	38																		27			28	–	–
61	Cody Erickson					26									22									26	–	–
62	Doug Coby																		12					25	–	–
63	Roger Reuse		DNQ							34						30	24					35		25	–	–
64	Jesse Iwuji	DNQ		31				38				28										30		23	–	–
65	Bryan Dauzat	19												34							39			22	–	–
66	Erik Darnell								17															20	–	–
67	Ray Ciccarelli	DNQ			DNQ				DNQ			32		23					39					20	–	–
68	Jett Noland		29				26								37									20	–	–
69	Devon Rouse														18									19	–	–
70	Andrew Gordon					31									24									19	–	–
71	Bobby Reuse		27													29								17	–	–
72	Armani Williams																21							16	–	–
73	Dean Thompson																						21	16	–	–
74	Will Rodgers															39^{¶}							22	15	–	–
75	Kyle Strickler														23									14	–	–
76	Akinori Ogata				37				34		28													13	–	–
77	Ty Dillon																						25	12	–	–
78	Jessica Friesen					DNQ									26									11	–	–
79	Derek Griffith																26							11	–	–
80	Trey Hutchens				DNQ		DNQ	DNQ	DNQ		32		33											9	–	–
81	Michele Abbate									29														8	–	–
82	Todd Peck	DNQ							DNQ					29										8	–	–
83	Parker Price-Miller														29									8	–	–
84	Donny Schatz														32									7	2	–
85	B. J. McLeod			26^{¤}					32															5	–	–
86	Gus Dean	34																						3	–	–
87	Chad Chastain															34								2	–	–
88	James Buescher	36																						1	–	–
89	Bill Lester				36																			1	–	–
90	Cameron Lawrence									36														1	–	–
91	Conor Daly			40																				1	–	–
92	Morgan Alexander														40									1	–	–
	Tim Viens **(R)**	DNQ	DNQ																					0	–	–
	Samuel LeComte									DNQ						DNQ								0	–	–
	Joe Nemechek	DNQ																						0	–	–
	Trevor Collins					DNQ																		0	–	–
	Logan Bearden									DNQ														0	–	–
	John Atwell									DNQ														0	–	–
	Brad Gross									DNQ														0	–	–
	J. R. Heffner					Wth																		0	–	–
Ineligible for Camping World Truck championship points
Pos.	Driver	DAY	DRC	LVS	ATL	BRD	RCH	KAN	DAR	COA	CLT	TEX	NSH	POC	KNX	GLN	GTW	DAR	BRI	LVS	TAL	MAR	PHO	Pts.	Stage	Bonus
	Kyle Busch			2^{2}	1*		2	1*^{12}						2*												
	Ryan Preece												1	9												
	Martin Truex Jr.					1*^{12}																				
	Ross Chastain				7			2				36	22													
	Chase Elliott											2														
	Chase Briscoe					5		19							36											
	Riley Herbst		5																							
	Sam Mayer		37				9			6						9			22							
	Brett Moffitt	25	25	11	9	24	37								38					25						
	Josh Berry				22							10	19	11	28	11	15	17	11			28				
	Bubba Wallace					11																				
	Colby Howard																	13	15			38				
	Kevin Harvick					15																				
	Chris Windom														15											
	Daniel Suárez					17																				
	C. J. McLaughlin							34			27								26	20						
	Dylan Lupton																	31		21	26					
	Myatt Snider					22																				
	A. J. Allmendinger															27										
	Mike Marlar					28																				
	Sage Karam																					32				
	Ryan Ellis				34													37								
	Kyle Larson					35																				
	William Byron												36													
	J. J. Yeley												DNQ													
	Ryan Newman					DNQ																				
	Michael Annett														QL											
Pos.	Driver	DAY	DRC	LVS	ATL	BRD	RCH	KAN	DAR	COA	CLT	TEX	NSH	POC	KNX	GLN	GTW	DAR	BRI	LVS	TAL	MAR	PHO	Pts.	Stage	Bonus
^{†} – Timmy Hill started receiving points at Kansas.^{‡} – Jordan Anderson started receiving points at Darlington.^{±} – Bayley Currey started receiving points at Darlington.^{¤} – B. J. McLeod started receiving points at Darlington.^{§} – Kaz Grala started receiving points at COTA.^{¶} – Will Rodgers started receiving points at Phoenix.

=== Owners' championship (Top 15) ===
(key) Bold – Pole position awarded by time. Italics – Pole position set by competition-based formula. * – Most laps led. ^{1} – Stage 1 winner. ^{2} – Stage 2 winner. ^{1-10} – Regular season top 10 finishers.
. – Eliminated after Round of 10 . – Eliminated after Round of 8

Pos.	No.	Car Owner	DAY	DRC	LVS	ATL	BRD	RCH	KAN	DAR	COA	CLT	TEX	NSH	POC	KNX	GLN	GTW	DAR	BRI	LVS	TAL	MAR	PHO	Points	Bonus
1	99	Duke Thorson	1	1	10	16	2	7	10	2	10^{2}	3	26	7	17	7	15	3	34	9	2	13^{1}	7	3	4034	19^{3}
2	21	Maurice J. Gallagher Jr.	16	40	6	6	7	14	7	16	8	10^{2}	6^{2}	4	8^{1}	14	6	35	9	8	29	33	1	5	4032	8^{6}
3	4	Kyle Busch	7^{2}	3^{1}	1*^{1}	3^{12}	39	1*^{2}	5	8*^{2}	12	1*	1*^{1}	10	1^{2}	11	2	22	2^{1}	3	33^{1}	4	39	7	4030	50^{1}
4	38	Bob Jenkins	31	4	13	17	4	6	6	15^{1}	1^{1}	5	7	2	7	4	4^{1}	29	4	10	5*^{2}	3*	25*^{12}	8	4029	16^{4}
NASCAR Camping World Truck Series Playoffs cut-off
5	2	Maurice J. Gallagher Jr.	6	2*	18	5	16	11	32	1	5*	35^{1}	35	14	3	35	3	1*^{12}	1*^{2}	19*^{12}	36	12^{2}	9	4*	2323	24^{8}
6	88	Rhonda Thorson	15	6	5	8	14	18	24	4	15	30	20	6	6	6	22	2	10	7	3	14	5	12	2282	2^{9}
7	16	Shigeaki Hattori	22	33	3	2	9	10	3	13	9	9	4	9	5	1	1*^{2}	23	12	24	10	32	2	10	2210	21^{2}
8	42	Al Niece	5	14	24	12	21	12	23	3	7	2	11	16	13	16	10	8	11	6	22	25	12	9	2203	1^{10}
9	98	Mike Curb	11	10	9	11	6	8^{1}	4	5	35	11	3	3	12	3	13	31	6	2	1	21	21	6	2201	5^{7}
10	51	Kyle Busch	10	23	2^{2}	1*	1*^{12}	2	1*^{12}	23	18	20	33	24	2*	8	18	26	31	34	24	35	11	18	2090	6^{5}
11	52	Chris Larsen	32	11	4	10	12	13	14	25	17	4	34	5	33	27	20	4	3	4	6	22	17	2	658	–
12	18	Kyle Busch	9*	12	19	35	34	4	11	27	33	6	5	13*^{2}	25	2*	40	28	7	1	35	19	4	**1**^{12}	576	6
13	13	Duke Thorson	**27**	18	15	4	32	5	9	6	22	31	12	12	35	20	23	5	8	5	4	30	31	11	505	–
14	19	Bill McAnally	33	7	32	13	38	15	28	35	21	8	13	**35***^{1}	10	**5**^{12}	21	20	16	13	12	20	24	15	480	3
15	22	Tim Self	21	15	14	23	10	19	16	9	16	17	15	27	19	30	16	9	14	14	8	29	20	26	447	–
Pos.	No.	Car Owner	DAY	DRC	LVS	ATL	BRD	RCH	KAN	DAR	COA	CLT	TEX	NSH	POC	KNX	GLN	GTW	DAR	BRI	LVS	TAL	MAR	PHO	Points	Bonus

=== Manufacturers' championship ===
Pos	Manufacturer	Wins	Points
1	Toyota	15	837
2	Chevrolet	5	765
3	Ford	2	686

== See also ==
- 2021 NASCAR Cup Series
- 2021 NASCAR Xfinity Series
- 2021 ARCA Menards Series
- 2021 ARCA Menards Series East
- 2021 ARCA Menards Series West
- 2021 NASCAR Whelen Modified Tour
- 2021 NASCAR Pinty's Series
- 2021 NASCAR PEAK Mexico Series
- 2021 NASCAR Whelen Euro Series
- 2021 eNASCAR iRacing Pro Invitational Series
- 2021 SRX Series
- 2021 Southern Modified Auto Racing Teams season
