= 2021 In It To Win It 200 =

2021 In It To Win It 200 presented by the South Carolina Education Lottery
Race details
- Race 17 of 22 in the 2021 NASCAR Camping World Truck Series season
- Date: September 4, 2021
- Location: Darlington Raceway, Darlington, South Carolina
- Course: Permanent racing facility
- Course length: 1.366 miles (2.198 km)
- Distance: 147 laps, 200.802 mi (323.159 km)
- Average speed: 105.331 miles per hour (169.514 km/h)

Pole position
Driver	Sheldon Creed	GMS Racing
- Grid positions set by competition-based formula

Most laps led
Driver	Sheldon Creed	GMS Racing
- Laps: 104

Winner
No. 2	Sheldon Creed	GMS Racing

Television in the United States
- Network: FS1
- Announcers: Vince Welch, Michael Waltrip, Ricky Carmichael

Radio in the United States
- Radio: MRN

The 2021 In It To Win It 200 presented by the South Carolina Education Lottery was the 17th stock car race of the 2021 NASCAR Camping World Truck Series. The race was held in Darlington, South Carolina at Darlington Raceway, a 1.366 miles (2.198 km) egg-shaped oval on September 4, 2021, over 147 laps. Sheldon Creed of GMS Racing would win the race, leading 104 laps. John Hunter Nemechek of Kyle Busch Motorsports and Stewart Friesen of Halmar Friesen Racing would take 2nd and 3rd, respectively.

== Background ==
The layout of Darlington Raceway, the venue where the race was held.

=== Entry list ===
#	Driver	Team	Make
1	Hailie Deegan	David Gilliland Racing	Ford
2	Sheldon Creed	GMS Racing	Chevrolet
02	Kris Wright	Young's Motorsports	Chevrolet
3	Jordan Anderson	Jordan Anderson Racing	Chevrolet
4	John Hunter Nemechek	Kyle Busch Motorsports	Toyota
6	Norm Benning	Norm Benning Racing	Chevrolet
9	Colby Howard	CR7 Motorsports	Chevrolet
10	Jennifer Jo Cobb	Jennifer Jo Cobb Racing	Ford
11	Spencer Davis	Spencer Davis Motorsports	Toyota
12	Tate Fogleman	Young's Motorsports	Chevrolet
13	Johnny Sauter	ThorSport Racing	Toyota
15	Tanner Gray	David Gilliland Racing	Ford
16	Austin Hill	Hattori Racing Enterprises	Toyota
18	Chandler Smith	Kyle Busch Motorsports	Toyota
19	Derek Kraus	McAnally–Hilgemann Racing	Toyota
20	Spencer Boyd	Young's Motorsports	Chevrolet
21	Zane Smith	GMS Racing	Chevrolet
22	Austin Wayne Self	AM Racing	Chevrolet
23	Chase Purdy	GMS Racing	Chevrolet
24	Jack Wood	GMS Racing	Chevrolet
25	Josh Berry	Rackley W.A.R.	Chevrolet
26	Tyler Ankrum	GMS Racing	Chevrolet
30	Danny Bohn	On Point Motorsports	Toyota
33	Ryan Ellis	Reaume Brothers Racing	Toyota
34	Josh Reaume	Reaume Brothers Racing	Toyota
38	Todd Gilliland	Front Row Motorsports	Ford
40	Ryan Truex	Niece Motorsports	Chevrolet
41	Dawson Cram	Cram Racing Enterprises	Chevrolet
42	Carson Hocevar	Niece Motorsports	Chevrolet
45	Lawless Alan	Niece Motorsports	Chevrolet
51	Dylan Lupton	Kyle Busch Motorsports	Toyota
52	Stewart Friesen	Halmar Friesen Racing	Toyota
56	Tyler Hill	Hill Motorsports	Chevrolet
68	Clay Greenfield	Clay Greenfield Motorsports	Toyota
75	Parker Kligerman	Henderson Motorsports	Chevrolet
88	Matt Crafton	ThorSport Racing	Toyota
98	Grant Enfinger	ThorSport Racing	Toyota
99	Ben Rhodes	ThorSport Racing	Toyota
Official entry list

== Starting lineup ==
Pos.	#	Driver	Team	Make
1	2	Sheldon Creed	GMS Racing	Chevrolet
2	88	Matt Crafton	ThorSport Racing	Toyota
3	99	Ben Rhodes	ThorSport Racing	Toyota
4	52	Stewart Friesen	Halmar Friesen Racing	Toyota
5	42	Carson Hocevar	Niece Motorsports	Chevrolet
6	4	John Hunter Nemechek	Kyle Busch Motorsports	Toyota
7	16	Austin Hill	Hattori Racing Enterprises	Toyota
8	38	Todd Gilliland	Front Row Motorsports	Ford
9	18	Chandler Smith	Kyle Busch Motorsports	Toyota
10	21	Zane Smith	GMS Racing	Chevrolet
11	51	Dylan Lupton	Kyle Busch Motorsports	Toyota
12	98	Grant Enfinger	ThorSport Racing	Toyota
13	13	Johnny Sauter	ThorSport Racing	Toyota
14	1	Hailie Deegan	David Gilliland Racing	Ford
15	24	Jack Wood	GMS Racing	Chevrolet
16	22	Austin Wayne Self	AM Racing	Chevrolet
17	23	Chase Purdy	GMS Racing	Chevrolet
18	19	Derek Kraus	McAnally–Hilgemann Racing	Toyota
19	40	Ryan Truex	Niece Motorsports	Chevrolet
20	25	Josh Berry	Rackley W.A.R.	Chevrolet
21	56	Tyler Hill	Hill Motorsports	Chevrolet
22	15	Tanner Gray	David Gilliland Racing	Ford
23	02	Kris Wright	Young's Motorsports	Chevrolet
24	12	Tate Fogleman	Young's Motorsports	Chevrolet
25	26	Tyler Ankrum	GMS Racing	Chevrolet
26	20	Spencer Boyd	Young's Motorsports	Chevrolet
27	30	Danny Bohn	On Point Motorsports	Toyota
28	41	Dawson Cram	Cram Racing Enterprises	Chevrolet
29	9	Colby Howard	CR7 Motorsports	Chevrolet
30	34	Josh Reaume	Reaume Brothers Racing	Toyota
31	45	Lawless Alan	Niece Motorsports	Chevrolet
32	33	Ryan Ellis	Reaume Brothers Racing	Toyota
33	3	Jordan Anderson	Jordan Anderson Racing	Chevrolet
34	75	Parker Kligerman	Henderson Motorsports	Chevrolet
35	10	Jennifer Jo Cobb	Jennifer Jo Cobb Racing	Ford
36	11	Spencer Davis	Spencer Davis Motorsports	Toyota
37	6	Norm Benning	Norm Benning Racing	Chevrolet
38	68	Clay Greenfield	Clay Greenfield Motorsports	Toyota

== Race results ==
=== Stage 1 ===
Fin	#	Driver	Team	Make	Pts
1	4	John Hunter Nemechek	Kyle Busch Motorsports	Toyota	10
2	88	Matt Crafton	ThorSport Racing	Toyota	9
3	21	Zane Smith	GMS Racing	Chevrolet	8
4	2	Sheldon Creed	GMS Racing	Chevrolet	7
5	52	Stewart Friesen	Halmar Friesen Racing	Toyota	6
6	38	Todd Gilliland	Front Row Motorsports	Ford	5
7	42	Carson Hocevar	Niece Motorsports	Chevrolet	4
8	18	Chandler Smith	Kyle Busch Motorsports	Toyota	3
9	75	Parker Kligerman	Henderson Motorsports	Chevrolet	2
10	99	Ben Rhodes	ThorSport Racing	Toyota	1

=== Stage 2 ===
Fin	#	Driver	Team	Make	Pts
1	2	Sheldon Creed	GMS Racing	Chevrolet	10
2	18	Chandler Smith	Kyle Busch Motorsports	Toyota	9
3	4	John Hunter Nemechek	Kyle Busch Motorsports	Toyota	8
4	88	Matt Crafton	ThorSport Racing	Toyota	7
5	42	Carson Hocevar	Niece Motorsports	Chevrolet	6
6	21	Zane Smith	GMS Racing	Chevrolet	5
7	38	Todd Gilliland	Front Row Motorsports	Ford	4
8	52	Stewart Friesen	Halmar Friesen Racing	Toyota	3
9	75	Parker Kligerman	Henderson Motorsports	Chevrolet	2
10	15	Tanner Gray	David Gilliland Racing	Ford	1

=== Stage 3 ===
Fin	St	#	Driver	Team	Make	Laps	Led	Status	Pts
1	1	2	Sheldon Creed	GMS Racing	Chevrolet	147	104	running	57
2	6	4	John Hunter Nemechek	Kyle Busch Motorsports	Toyota	147	39	running	53
3	4	52	Stewart Friesen	Halmar Friesen Racing	Toyota	147	0	running	43
4	8	38	Todd Gilliland	Front Row Motorsports	Ford	147	0	running	42
5	34	75	Parker Kligerman	Henderson Motorsports	Chevrolet	147	0	running	36
6	12	98	Grant Enfinger	ThorSport Racing	Toyota	147	0	running	31
7	9	18	Chandler Smith	Kyle Busch Motorsports	Toyota	147	4	running	42
8	13	13	Johnny Sauter	ThorSport Racing	Toyota	147	0	running	29
9	10	21	Zane Smith	GMS Racing	Chevrolet	147	0	running	41
10	2	88	Matt Crafton	ThorSport Racing	Toyota	147	0	running	43
11	5	42	Carson Hocevar	Niece Motorsports	Chevrolet	147	0	running	36
12	7	16	Austin Hill	Hattori Racing Enterprises	Toyota	147	0	running	25
13	29	9	Colby Howard	CR7 Motorsports	Chevrolet	147	0	running	0
14	16	22	Austin Wayne Self	AM Racing	Chevrolet	147	0	running	23
15	17	23	Chase Purdy	GMS Racing	Chevrolet	147	0	running	22
16	18	19	Derek Kraus	McAnally–Hilgemann Racing	Toyota	147	0	running	21
17	20	25	Josh Berry	Rackley W.A.R.	Chevrolet	147	0	running	0
18	25	26	Tyler Ankrum	GMS Racing	Chevrolet	147	0	running	19
19	38	68	Clay Greenfield	Clay Greenfield Motorsports	Toyota	146	0	running	18
20	27	30	Danny Bohn	On Point Motorsports	Toyota	146	0	running	17
21	26	20	Spencer Boyd	Young's Motorsports	Chevrolet	146	0	running	16
22	36	11	Spencer Davis	Spencer Davis Motorsports	Toyota	146	0	running	15
23	28	41	Dawson Cram	Cram Racing Enterprises	Chevrolet	146	0	running	14
24	22	15	Tanner Gray	David Gilliland Racing	Ford	146	0	running	14
25	30	34	Josh Reaume	Reaume Brothers Racing	Toyota	146	0	running	12
26	33	3	Jordan Anderson	Jordan Anderson Racing	Chevrolet	145	0	running	11
27	31	45	Lawless Alan	Niece Motorsports	Chevrolet	145	0	running	10
28	23	02	Kris Wright	Young's Motorsports	Chevrolet	144	0	running	9
29	14	1	Hailie Deegan	David Gilliland Racing	Ford	144	0	running	8
30	15	24	Jack Wood	GMS Racing	Chevrolet	143	0	running	7
31	11	51	Dylan Lupton	Kyle Busch Motorsports	Toyota	143	0	running	0
32	21	56	Tyler Hill	Hill Motorsports	Chevrolet	141	0	accident	5
33	19	40	Ryan Truex	Niece Motorsports	Chevrolet	141	0	running	4
34	3	99	Ben Rhodes	ThorSport Racing	Toyota	140	0	running	4
35	37	6	Norm Benning	Norm Benning Racing	Chevrolet	86	0	too slow	2
36	35	10	Jennifer Jo Cobb	Jennifer Jo Cobb Racing	Ford	75	0	too slow	1
37	32	33	Ryan Ellis	Reaume Brothers Racing	Toyota	28	0	transmission	0
38	24	12	Tate Fogleman	Young's Motorsports	Chevrolet	22	0	rear gear	1
