= 2021 Victoria's Voice Foundation 200 =

2021 Victoria's Voice Foundation 200 presented by Westgate Resorts
Race details
- Race 19 of 22 of the 2021 NASCAR Camping World Truck Series
- Date: September 24, 2021
- Official name: Victoria's Voice Foundation 200 presented by Westgate Resorts
- Location: North Las Vegas, Nevada, Las Vegas Motor Speedway
- Course: Permanent racing facility
- Course length: 1.5 miles (2.41 km)
- Distance: 134 laps, 201 mi (323.476 km)
- Scheduled distance: 134 laps, 201 mi (323.476 km)
- Average speed: 105.358 miles per hour (169.557 km/h)

Pole position
Driver	John Hunter Nemechek	Kyle Busch Motorsports
- Grid positions set by competition-based formula

Most laps led
Driver	Todd Gilliland	Front Row Motorsports
- Laps: 66

Winner
No. 98	Christian Eckes	ThorSport Racing

Television in the United States
- Network: Fox Sports 1
- Announcers: Vince Welch, Michael Waltrip, Kurt Busch

Radio in the United States
- Radio: Motor Racing Network

The 2021 Victoria's Voice Foundation 200 presented by Westgate Resorts was the 19th stock car race of the 2021 NASCAR Camping World Truck Series season. The race was held on September 24, 2021 in North Las Vegas, Nevada at Las Vegas Motor Speedway, a 1.5 miles (2.4 km) permanent D-shaped oval racetrack. The race took 134 laps to complete. In a historic first, ThorSport Racing and their 4 cars would all end up finishing 1-2-3-4, with Christian Eckes getting his first ever win in the series, driving a part-time schedule for ThorSport Racing. Ben Rhodes and Matt Crafton would fill in the rest of the podium positions, finishing 2nd and 3rd, respectively. Johnny Sauter would come back during the final restart to help complete the historic feat to finish 4th.

== Background ==
The layout of Las Vegas Motor Speedway, the venue where the race was held.

Las Vegas Motor Speedway, located in Clark County, Nevada outside the Las Vegas city limits and about 15 miles northeast of the Las Vegas Strip, is a 1,200-acre (490 ha) complex of multiple tracks for motorsports racing. The complex is owned by Speedway Motorsports, Inc., which is headquartered in Charlotte, North Carolina.

=== Entry list ===
#	Driver	Team	Make
1	Hailie Deegan	David Gilliland Racing	Ford
2	Sheldon Creed	GMS Racing	Chevrolet
02	Kris Wright	Young's Motorsports	Chevrolet
3	Howie DiSavino III	Jordan Anderson Racing	Chevrolet
4	John Hunter Nemechek	Kyle Busch Motorsports	Toyota
04	Cory Roper	Roper Racing	Ford
9	Grant Enfinger	CR7 Motorsports	Chevrolet
10	Jennifer Jo Cobb	Jennifer Jo Cobb Racing	Ford
11	Spencer Davis	Spencer Davis Motorsports	Toyota
12	Tate Fogleman	Young's Motorsports	Chevrolet
13	Johnny Sauter	ThorSport Racing	Toyota
15	Tanner Gray	David Gilliland Racing	Ford
16	Austin Hill	Hattori Racing Enterprises	Toyota
18	Chandler Smith	Kyle Busch Motorsports	Toyota
19	Derek Kraus	McAnally–Hilgemann Racing	Toyota
20	Spencer Boyd	Young's Motorsports	Chevrolet
21	Zane Smith	GMS Racing	Chevrolet
22	Austin Wayne Self	AM Racing	Chevrolet
23	Chase Purdy	GMS Racing	Chevrolet
24	Jack Wood	GMS Racing	Chevrolet
25	Brett Moffitt	Rackley W.A.R.	Chevrolet
26	Tyler Ankrum	GMS Racing	Chevrolet
30	Danny Bohn	On Point Motorsports	Toyota
32	Bret Holmes	Bret Holmes Racing	Chevrolet
33	C. J. McLaughlin	Reaume Brothers Racing	Toyota
34	Dylan Lupton	Reaume Brothers Racing	Toyota
38	Todd Gilliland	Front Row Motorsports	Ford
40	Ryan Truex	Niece Motorsports	Chevrolet
42	Carson Hocevar	Niece Motorsports	Chevrolet
45	Chris Hacker	Niece Motorsports	Chevrolet
49	Ray Ciccarelli*	CMI Motorsports	Ford
51	Drew Dollar	Kyle Busch Motorsports	Toyota
52	Stewart Friesen	Halmar Friesen Racing	Toyota
56	Tyler Hill	Hill Motorsports	Chevrolet
88	Matt Crafton	ThorSport Racing	Toyota
98	Christian Eckes	ThorSport Racing	Toyota
99	Ben Rhodes	ThorSport Racing	Toyota
Official entry list

*Driver would change to Keith McGee for the race, after gambling $10,000 in Las Vegas for sponsorship.

== Qualifying ==
Qualifying was determined by a metric qualifying system based on the last race, the 2021 UNOH 200. As a result, John Hunter Nemechek of Kyle Busch Motorsports would win the pole.

Pos.	#	Driver	Team	Make
1	4	John Hunter Nemechek	Kyle Busch Motorsports	Toyota
2	18	Chandler Smith	Kyle Busch Motorsports	Toyota
3	52	Stewart Friesen	Halmar Friesen Racing	Toyota
4	21	Zane Smith	GMS Racing	Chevrolet
5	42	Carson Hocevar	Niece Motorsports	Chevrolet
6	88	Matt Crafton	ThorSport Racing	Toyota
7	99	Ben Rhodes	ThorSport Racing	Toyota
8	38	Todd Gilliland	Front Row Motorsports	Ford
9	2	Sheldon Creed	GMS Racing	Chevrolet
10	16	Austin Hill	Hattori Racing Enterprises	Toyota
11	13	Johnny Sauter	ThorSport Racing	Toyota
12	19	Derek Kraus	McAnally–Hilgemann Racing	Toyota
13	22	Austin Wayne Self	AM Racing	Chevrolet
14	40	Ryan Truex	Niece Motorsports	Chevrolet
15	98	Christian Eckes	ThorSport Racing	Toyota
16	26	Tyler Ankrum	GMS Racing	Chevrolet
17	1	Hailie Deegan	David Gilliland Racing	Ford
18	51	Drew Dollar	Kyle Busch Motorsports	Toyota
19	23	Chase Purdy	GMS Racing	Chevrolet
20	24	Jack Wood	GMS Racing	Chevrolet
21	04	Cory Roper	Roper Racing	Ford
22	25	Brett Moffitt	Rackley W.A.R.	Chevrolet
23	9	Grant Enfinger	CR7 Motorsports	Chevrolet
24	56	Tyler Hill	Hill Motorsports	Chevrolet
25	3	Howie DiSavino III	Jordan Anderson Racing	Chevrolet
26	02	Kris Wright	Young's Motorsports	Chevrolet
27	45	Chris Hacker	Niece Motorsports	Chevrolet
28	30	Danny Bohn	On Point Motorsports	Toyota
29	15	Tanner Gray	David Gilliland Racing	Ford
30	33	C. J. McLaughlin	Reaume Brothers Racing	Toyota
31	20	Spencer Boyd	Young's Motorsports	Chevrolet
32	10	Jennifer Jo Cobb	Jennifer Jo Cobb Racing	Ford
33	12	Tate Fogleman	Young's Motorsports	Chevrolet
34	11	Spencer Davis	Spencer Davis Motorsports	Toyota
35	32	Bret Holmes	Bret Holmes Racing	Chevrolet
36	34	Dylan Lupton	Reaume Brothers Racing	Toyota
37	49	Keith McGee	CMI Motorsports	Ford
Official starting lineup

== Race results ==
Stage 1 Laps: 40

Fin	#	Driver	Team	Make	Pts
1	4	John Hunter Nemechek	Kyle Busch Motorsports	Toyota	10
2	38	Todd Gilliland	Front Row Motorsports	Ford	9
3	18	Chandler Smith	Kyle Busch Motorsports	Toyota	8
4	99	Ben Rhodes	ThorSport Racing	Toyota	7
5	52	Stewart Friesen	Halmar Friesen Racing	Toyota	6
6	21	Zane Smith	GMS Racing	Chevrolet	5
7	98	Christian Eckes	ThorSport Racing	Toyota	4
8	2	Sheldon Creed	GMS Racing	Chevrolet	3
9	16	Austin Hill	Hattori Racing Enterprises	Toyota	2
10	26	Tyler Ankrum	GMS Racing	Chevrolet	1

Stage 2 Laps: 40

Fin	#	Driver	Team	Make	Pts
1	38	Todd Gilliland	Front Row Motorsports	Ford	10
2	99	Ben Rhodes	ThorSport Racing	Toyota	9
3	42	Carson Hocevar	Niece Motorsports	Chevrolet	8
4	52	Stewart Friesen	Halmar Friesen Racing	Toyota	7
5	2	Sheldon Creed	GMS Racing	Chevrolet	6
6	15	Tanner Gray	David Gilliland Racing	Ford	5
7	16	Austin Hill	Hattori Racing Enterprises	Toyota	4
8	88	Matt Crafton	ThorSport Racing	Toyota	3
9	98	Christian Eckes	ThorSport Racing	Toyota	2
10	18	Chandler Smith	Kyle Busch Motorsports	Toyota	1

Stage 3 Laps: 54

Fin	St	#	Driver	Team	Make	Laps	Led	Status	Pts
1	15	98	Christian Eckes	ThorSport Racing	Toyota	134	4	running	46
2	7	99	Ben Rhodes	ThorSport Racing	Toyota	134	5	running	51
3	6	88	Matt Crafton	ThorSport Racing	Toyota	134	0	running	37
4	11	13	Johnny Sauter	ThorSport Racing	Toyota	134	2	running	33
5	8	38	Todd Gilliland	Front Row Motorsports	Ford	134	66	running	51
6	3	52	Stewart Friesen	Halmar Friesen Racing	Toyota	134	1	running	44
7	23	9	Grant Enfinger	CR7 Motorsports	Chevrolet	134	0	running	30
8	13	22	Austin Wayne Self	AM Racing	Chevrolet	134	0	running	29
9	14	40	Ryan Truex	Niece Motorsports	Chevrolet	134	0	running	28
10	10	16	Austin Hill	Hattori Racing Enterprises	Toyota	134	12	running	33
11	35	32	Bret Holmes	Bret Holmes Racing	Chevrolet	134	1	running	26
12	12	19	Derek Kraus	McAnally–Hilgemann Racing	Toyota	134	0	running	25
13	19	23	Chase Purdy	GMS Racing	Chevrolet	134	0	running	24
14	33	12	Tate Fogleman	Young's Motorsports	Chevrolet	134	1	running	23
15	34	11	Spencer Davis	Spencer Davis Motorsports	Toyota	134	0	running	22
16	26	02	Kris Wright	Young's Motorsports	Chevrolet	134	0	running	21
17	24	56	Tyler Hill	Hill Motorsports	Chevrolet	133	0	running	20
18	28	30	Danny Bohn	On Point Motorsports	Toyota	133	0	running	19
19	31	20	Spencer Boyd	Young's Motorsports	Chevrolet	133	0	running	18
20	30	33	C. J. McLaughlin	Reaume Brothers Racing	Toyota	133	0	running	17
21	36	34	Dylan Lupton	Reaume Brothers Racing	Toyota	133	0	running	16
22	5	42	Carson Hocevar	Niece Motorsports	Chevrolet	132	8	running	23
23	29	15	Tanner Gray	David Gilliland Racing	Ford	132	0	running	19
24	18	51	Drew Dollar	Kyle Busch Motorsports	Toyota	132	0	running	13
25	22	25	Brett Moffitt	Rackley W.A.R.	Chevrolet	131	1	running	0
26	25	3	Howie DiSavino III	Jordan Anderson Racing	Chevrolet	130	0	running	11
27	32	10	Jennifer Jo Cobb	Jennifer Jo Cobb Racing	Ford	129	0	running	10
28	21	04	Cory Roper	Roper Racing	Ford	121	0	running	9
29	4	21	Zane Smith	GMS Racing	Chevrolet	115	0	running	13
30	20	24	Jack Wood	GMS Racing	Chevrolet	114	0	accident	7
31	17	1	Hailie Deegan	David Gilliland Racing	Ford	101	0	accident	6
32	37	49	Keith McGee	CMI Motorsports	Ford	91	0	too slow	5
33	1	4	John Hunter Nemechek	Kyle Busch Motorsports	Toyota	85	33	running	14
34	16	26	Tyler Ankrum	GMS Racing	Chevrolet	70	0	accident	4
35	2	18	Chandler Smith	Kyle Busch Motorsports	Toyota	70	0	accident	11
36	9	2	Sheldon Creed	GMS Racing	Chevrolet	70	0	accident	10
37	27	45	Chris Hacker	Niece Motorsports	Chevrolet	6	0	dvp	1
Official race results

Previous race: 2021 UNOH 200	NASCAR Camping World Truck Series; 2021 season	Next race: 2021 Chevrolet Silverado 250
