= 2021 Lucas Oil 150 =

Race details
- Race 22 of 22 in the 2021 NASCAR Camping World Truck Series season
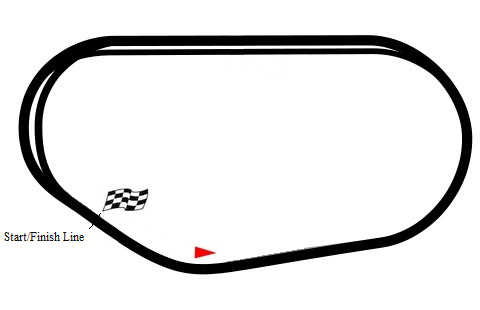
- Phoenix Raceway
- Date: November 4, 2021
- Location: Phoenix Raceway in Avondale, Arizona
- Course: Permanent racing facility
- Course length: 1.00 miles (1.60 km)
- Distance: 150 laps, 150.00 mi (241.40 km)
- Average speed: 99.374

Pole position
Driver	Chandler Smith	Kyle Busch Motorsports
- Time: 26.359

Most laps led
Driver	Sheldon Creed	GMS Racing
- Laps: 106

Winner
No. 18	Chandler Smith	Kyle Busch Motorsports

Television in the United States
- Network: FS1
- Announcers: Vince Welch, Michael Waltrip, and Phil Parsons

The 2021 Lucas Oil 150 was a NASCAR Camping World Truck Series race that was held on November 5, 2021. It was contested over 150 laps on the 1.00-mile (1.61 km) oval. It was the 22nd and final race of the 2021 NASCAR Camping World Truck Series season, as well as the championship race. The 4 drivers in the championship four coming into the race were Zane Smith, John Hunter Nemechek, Ben Rhodes, and Matt Crafton. Kyle Busch Motorsports driver Chandler Smith collected his second win of the season, while 3rd place finisher Ben Rhodes collected the championship.

== Report ==
=== Background ===
Phoenix Raceway is a one-mile, low-banked tri-oval race track located in Avondale, Arizona. It is named after the nearby metropolitan area of Phoenix. The motorsport track opened in 1964 and currently hosts two NASCAR race weekends annually. PIR has also hosted the IndyCar Series, CART, USAC and the Rolex Sports Car Series. The raceway is currently owned and operated by NASCAR.

The raceway was originally constructed with a 2.5 mi (4.0 km) road course that ran both inside and outside of the main tri-oval. In 1991 the track was reconfigured with the current 1.51 mi (2.43 km) interior layout. PIR has an estimated grandstand seating capacity of around 67,000. Lights were installed around the track in 2004 following the addition of a second annual NASCAR race weekend.

=== Entry list ===
- (R) denotes rookie driver.
- (i) denotes driver who is ineligible for series driver points.
- (CC) denotes Championship Contender.

No.	Driver	Team	Manufacturer
1	Hailie Deegan (R)	David Gilliland Racing	Ford
2	Sheldon Creed	GMS Racing	Chevrolet
02	Kris Wright	Young's Motorsports	Chevrolet
3	Jordan Anderson (i)	Jordan Anderson Racing	Chevrolet
04	Cory Roper	Roper Racing	Chevrolet
4	John Hunter Nemechek (CC)	Kyle Busch Motorsports	Toyota
6	Norm Benning	Norm Benning Racing	Chevrolet
9	Grant Enfinger	CR7 Motorsports	Chevrolet
10	Jennifer Jo Cobb	Jennifer Jo Cobb Racing	Ford
11	Spencer Davis	Spencer Davis Motorsports	Toyota
12	Tate Fogleman	Young's Motorsports	Chevrolet
13	Johnny Sauter	ThorSport Racing	Chevrolet
15	Tanner Gray	David Gilliland Racing	Ford
16	Austin Hill	Hattori Racing Enterprises	Toyota
17	Taylor Gray	David Gilliland Racing	Ford
18	Chandler Smith	Kyle Busch Motorsports	Toyota
19	Derek Kraus	McAnally–Hilgemann Racing	Toyota
20	Spencer Boyd	Young's Motorsports	Chevrolet
21	Zane Smith (CC)	GMS Racing	Chevrolet
22	Austin Wayne Self	AM Racing	Chevrolet
23	Chase Purdy	GMS Racing	Chevrolet
24	Jack Wood	GMS Racing	Chevrolet
25	Willie Allen	Rackley W.A.R.	Chevrolet
26	Tyler Ankrum	GMS Racing	Chevrolet
30	Danny Bohn	On Point Motorsports	Toyota
32	Ty Dillon (i)	Bret Holmes Racing	Chevrolet
33	Chris Hacker	Reaume Brothers Racing	Toyota
34	Will Rodgers (i)	Reaume Brothers Racing	Toyota
38	Todd Gilliland	Front Row Motorsports	Ford
40	Ryan Truex	Niece Motorsports	Chevrolet
41	Dawson Cram	Cram Racing Enterprises	Chevrolet
42	Carson Hocevar (R)	Niece Motorsports	Chevrolet
44	Dean Thompson	Niece Motorsports	Chevrolet
45	Lawless Alan	Niece Motorsports	Chevrolet
51	Drew Dollar	Kyle Busch Motorsports	Toyota
52	Stewart Friesen	Halmar Friesen Racing	Toyota
56	Tyler Hill	Hill Motorsports	Chevrolet
88	Matt Crafton (CC)	ThorSport Racing	Toyota
96	Todd Peck	Peck Motorsports	Chevrolet
98	Christian Eckes	ThorSport Racing	Toyota
99	Ben Rhodes (CC)	ThorSport Racing	Toyota
Official entry list

== Practice ==
Pos	No.	Driver	Team	Manufacturer	Time	Speed
1	38	Todd Gilliland	Front Row Motorsports	Ford	26.501	135.844
2	2	Sheldon Creed	GMS Racing	Chevrolet	26.632	156.176
3	26	Tyler Ankrum	GMS Racing	Chevrolet	26.656	135.054
Official first practice results

== Qualifying ==
=== Qualifying results ===
Pos	No	Driver	Team	Manufacturer	Time
1	18	Chandler Smith	Kyle Busch Motorsports	Toyota	26.359
2	2	Sheldon Creed	GMS Racing	Chevrolet	26.607
3	38	Todd Gilliland	Front Row Motorsports	Ford	26.635
4	99	Ben Rhodes	ThorSport Racing	Toyota	26.734
5	88	Matt Crafton	ThorSport Racing	Toyota	26.879
6	42	Carson Hocevar (R)	Niece Motorsports	Chevrolet	26.904
7	52	Stewart Friesen	Halmar Friesen Racing	Chevrolet	26.912
8	19	Derek Kraus	McAnally–Hilgemann Racing	Toyota	26.962
9	98	Christian Eckes	ThorSport Racing	Toyota	26.980
10	1	Hailie Deegan (R)	David Gilliland Racing	Ford	26.992
11	16	Austin Hill	Hattori Racing Enterprises	Toyota	27.008
12	23	Chase Purdy	GMS Racing	Chevrolet	27.040
13	21	Zane Smith	GMS Racing	Chevrolet	27.066
14	26	Tyler Ankrum	GMS Racing	Chevrolet	27.083
15	24	Jack Wood	GMS Racing	Chevrolet	27.086
16	4	John Hunter Nemechek	Kyle Busch Motorsports	Toyota	27.087
17	13	Johnny Sauter	ThorSport Racing	Toyota	27.171
18	40	Ryan Truex	Niece Motorsports	Chevrolet	27.203
19	32	Ty Dillon (i)	Bret Holmes Racing	Chevrolet	27.353
20	02	Kris Wright	Young's Motorsports	Chevrolet	27.377
21	12	Tate Fogleman	Young's Motorsports	Chevrolet	27.423
22	15	Tanner Gray	David Gilliland Racing	Ford	27.443
23	51	Drew Dollar	Kyle Busch Motorsports	Toyota	27.472
24	22	Austin Wayne Self	AM Racing	Chevrolet	27.477
25	44	Dean Thompson	Niece Motorsports	Chevrolet	27.536
26	17	Taylor Gray	David Gilliland Racing	Ford	27.546
27	9	Grant Enfinger	CR7 Motorsports	Chevrolet	27.613
28	30	Danny Bohn	On Point Motorsports	Toyota	27.641
29	3	Jordan Anderson	Jordan Anderson Racing	Chevrolet	27.647
30	34	Will Rodgers	Reaume Brothers Racing	Toyota	27.777
31	33	Chris Hacker	Reaume Brothers Racing	Toyota	27.779
32	25	Willie Allen	Rackley W.A.R.	Chevrolet	27.840
33	45	Lawless Alan	Niece Motorsports	Chevrolet	27.918
34	56	Tyler Hill	Hill Motorsports	Chevrolet	28.021
35	04	Cory Roper	Roper Racing	Ford	28.242
36	20	Spencer Boyd	Young's Motorsports	Chevrolet	28.404
Did not qualify
37	41	Dawson Cram	Cram Racing Enterprises	Chevrolet	27.908
38	10	Jennifer Jo Cobb	Jennifer Jo Cobb Racing	Ford	28.743
39	6	Norm Benning	Norm Benning Racing	Chevrolet	29.277
Official qualifying results

== Race ==
=== Race results ===
==== Stage Results ====
Stage One Laps: 45

Pos	No	Driver	Team	Manufacturer	Points
1	18	Chandler Smith (R)	Kyle Busch Motorsports	Toyota	10
2	2	Sheldon Creed	GMS Racing	Chevrolet	9
3	38	Todd Gilliland	Front Row Motorsports	Ford	8
4	52	Stewart Friesen	Halmar Friesen Racing	Toyota	7
5	99	Ben Rhodes	ThorSport Racing	Toyota	6
6	42	Carson Hocevar (R)	Niece Motorsports	Chevrolet	5
7	88	Matt Crafton	ThorSport Racing	Toyota	4
8	98	Christian Eckes	ThorSport Racing	Toyota	3
9	21	Zane Smith	GMS Racing	Chevrolet	2
10	19	Derek Kraus	McAnally–Hilgemann Racing	Toyota	1

Stage Two Laps: 45

Pos	No	Driver	Team	Manufacturer	Points
1	18	Chandler Smith (R)	Kyle Busch Motorsports	Toyota	10
2	2	Sheldon Creed	GMS Racing	Chevrolet	9
3	99	Ben Rhodes	ThorSport Racing	Toyota	8
4	52	Stewart Friesen	Halmar Friesen Racing	Toyota	7
5	38	Todd Gilliland	Front Row Motorsports	Ford	6
6	21	Zane Smith	GMS Racing	Chevrolet	5
7	42	Carson Hocevar (R)	Niece Motorsports	Chevrolet	4
8	88	Matt Crafton	ThorSport Racing	Toyota	3
9	9	Grant Enfinger	CR7 Motorsports	Chevrolet	2
10	98	Christian Eckes	ThorSport Racing	Toyota	1

=== Final Stage Results ===
Laps: 60

Pos	Grid	No	Driver	Team	Manufacturer	Laps	Points	Status
1	1	18	Chandler Smith	Kyle Busch Motorsports	Toyota	150	60	Running
2	7	52	Stewart Friesen	Halmar Friesen Racing	Toyota	150	49	Running
3	4	99	Ben Rhodes	ThorSport Racing	Toyota	150	48	Running
4	2	2	Sheldon Creed	GMS Racing	Chevrolet	150	51	Running
5	13	21	Zane Smith	GMS Racing	Chevrolet	150	39	Running
6	9	98	Christian Eckes	ThorSport Racing	Toyota	150	35	Running
7	16	4	John Hunter Nemechek	Kyle Busch Motorsports	Toyota	150	30	Running
8	3	38	Todd Gilliland	Front Row Motorsports	Ford	150	43	Running
9	6	42	Carson Hocevar	Niece Motorsports	Chevrolet	150	37	Running
10	11	16	Austin Hill	Hattori Racing Enterprises	Toyota	150	27	Running
11	17	13	Johnny Sauter	ThorSport Racing	Toyota	150	26	Running
12	5	88	Matt Crafton	ThorSport Racing	Toyota	150	32	Running
13	27	9	Grant Enfinger	CR7 Motorsports	Chevrolet	150	26	Running
14	14	26	Tyler Ankrum	GMS Racing	Chevrolet	150	23	Running
15	8	19	Derek Kraus	McAnally–Hilgemann Racing	Toyota	150	23	Running
16	12	23	Chase Purdy	GMS Racing	Chevrolet	150	21	Running
17	10	1	Hailie Deegan	David Gilliland Racing	Ford	150	20	Running
18	23	51	Drew Dollar	Kyle Busch Motorsports	Toyota	150	19	Running
19	18	40	Ryan Truex	Niece Motorsports	Chevrolet	150	18	Running
20	15	24	Jack Wood	GMS Racing	Chevrolet	150	17	Running
21	25	44	Dean Thompson	Niece Motorsports	Chevrolet	149	16	Running
22	30	34	Will Rodgers	Reaume Brothers Racing	Toyota	149	15	Running
23	29	3	Jordan Anderson	Jordan Anderson Racing	Chevrolet	149	14	Running
24	32	25	Willie Allen	Rackley W.A.R.	Chevrolet	149	13	Running
25	19	32	Ty Dillon	Bret Holmes Racing	Chevrolet	149	12	Running
26	24	22	Austin Wayne Self	AM Racing	Chevrolet	147	11	Running
27	31	33	Chris Hacker	Reaume Brothers Racing	Toyota	147	10	Running
28	28	30	Danny Bohn	On Point Motorsports	Toyota	147	9	Running
29	26	17	Taylor Gray	David Gilliland Racing	Ford	146	8	Running
30	35	04	Cory Roper	Roper Racing	Ford	146	7	Running
31	36	20	Spencer Boyd	Young's Motorsports	Chevrolet	146	6	Running
32	20	02	Kris Wright	Young's Motorsports	Chevrolet	143	5	Running
33	34	56	Tyler Hill	Hill Motorsports	Chevrolet	106	4	Alternator
34	21	12	Tate Fogleman	Young's Motorsports	Chevrolet	98	3	Electrical
35	22	15	Tanner Gray	David Gilliland Racing	Ford	80	2	Rear Gear
36	33	45	Lawless Alan	Niece Motorsports	Chevrolet	11	1	Accident
Official race results

=== Race statistics ===
- Lead changes: 12 among 3 different drivers
- Cautions/Laps: 4 for 25
- Time of race: 1 hours, 30 minutes, and 34 seconds
- Average speed: 99.374 mph (159.927 km/h)

Previous race: 2021 United Rentals 200	NASCAR Camping World Truck Series; 2021 season	Next race: 2022 NextEra Energy 250
