= 2024 NASCAR Craftsman Truck Series Championship Race =

23rd race of the 2024 NASCAR Craftsman Truck Series

Race details
- Race 23 of 23 of the 2024 NASCAR Craftsman Truck Series
- Date: November 8, 2024
- Official name: 30th Annual NASCAR Craftsman Truck Series Championship Race
- Location: Phoenix Raceway in Avondale, Arizona
- Course: Permanent racing facility
- Course length: 1 miles (1.6 km)
- Distance: 150 laps, 150 mi (241 km)
- Scheduled distance: 150 laps, 150 mi (241 km)
- Average speed: 86.276 mph (138.848 km/h)

Pole position
Driver	Ty Majeski	ThorSport Racing
- Time: 26.053

Most laps led
Driver	Ty Majeski	ThorSport Racing
- Laps: 132

Winner
No. 98	Ty Majeski	ThorSport Racing

Television in the United States
- Network: FS1
- Announcers: Adam Alexander, Phil Parsons, and Michael Waltrip

Radio in the United States
- Radio: MRN

The 2024 NASCAR Craftsman Truck Series Championship Race was the 23rd and final stock car race of the 2024 NASCAR Craftsman Truck Series, the Championship 4 race, and the 30th iteration of the event. The race was held on Friday, November 8, 2024, at Phoenix Raceway in Avondale, Arizona, a 1 mile (1.6 km) permanent tri-oval shaped racetrack. The race took the scheduled 150 laps to complete. In a fast-paced race, Ty Majeski, driving for ThorSport Racing, would put on a blistering performance when it mattered the most, winning the pole and leading a race-high 132 laps to earn his sixth career NASCAR Craftsman Truck Series win, and his third of the season. To fill out the podium, fellow championship contenders Corey Heim, driving for Tricon Garage, and Christian Eckes, driving for McAnally-Hilgemann Racing, would finish 2nd and 3rd, respectively.

In addition to winning the race, Majeski clinched the 2024 NASCAR Craftsman Truck Series championship, finishing one position ahead of his closest competitors, Corey Heim and Christian Eckes. This is Majeski's first championship in the series, and the second consecutive championship for ThorSport Racing, winning it the previous season with Ben Rhodes.

== Report ==
=== Background ===
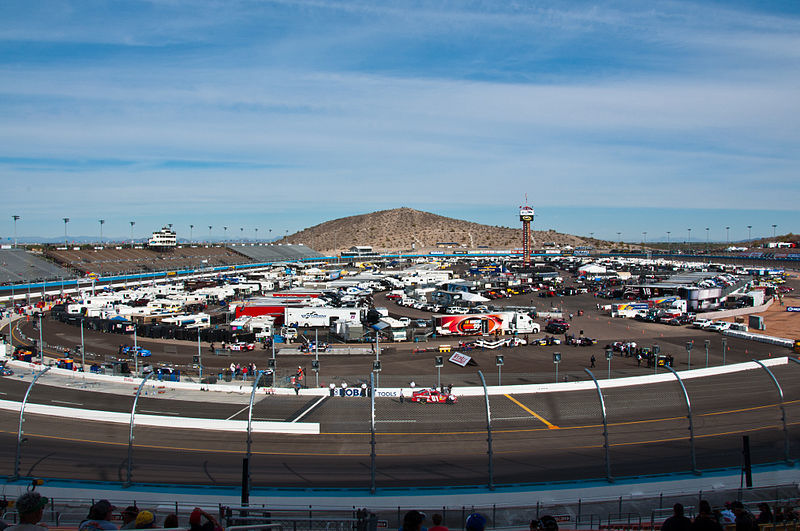
Phoenix Raceway, the circuit where the race was held.

Phoenix Raceway – also known as PIR – is a one-mile, low-banked tri-oval race track located in Avondale, Arizona. It is named after the nearby metropolitan area of Phoenix. The motorsport track opened in 1964 and currently hosts two NASCAR race weekends annually. PIR has also hosted the IndyCar Series, CART, USAC and the Rolex Sports Car Series. The raceway is currently owned and operated by International Speedway Corporation.

The raceway was originally constructed with a 2.5 mi (4.0 km) road course that ran both inside and outside of the main tri-oval. In 1991 the track was reconfigured with the current 1.51 mi (2.43 km) interior layout. PIR has an estimated grandstand seating capacity of around 67,000. Lights were installed around the track in 2004 following the addition of a second annual NASCAR race weekend.

Phoenix Raceway is home to two annual NASCAR race weekends, one of 13 facilities on the NASCAR schedule to host more than one race weekend a year. The track is both the first and last stop in the western United States, as well as the fourth and the last track on the schedule.

=== Championship drivers ===
- Grant Enfinger advanced after winning at Talladega and Homestead–Miami.
- Christian Eckes advanced after winning at Martinsville.
- Corey Heim advanced by virtue of points.
- Ty Majeski advanced by virtue of points.

==== Entry list ====
- (R) denotes rookie driver.
- (CC) denotes championship contender.

#	Driver	Team	Make
1	William Sawalich	Tricon Garage	Toyota
02	Nathan Byrd	Young's Motorsports	Chevrolet
2	Nick Sanchez	Rev Racing	Chevrolet
04	Andrés Pérez de Lara	Roper Racing	Chevrolet
4	Brett Moffitt	Hettinger Racing	Chevrolet
5	Dean Thompson	Tricon Garage	Toyota
7	Connor Mosack	Spire Motorsports	Chevrolet
9	Grant Enfinger (CC)	CR7 Motorsports	Chevrolet
11	Corey Heim (CC)	Tricon Garage	Toyota
13	Jake Garcia	ThorSport Racing	Ford
15	Tanner Gray	Tricon Garage	Toyota
17	Taylor Gray	Tricon Garage	Toyota
18	Tyler Ankrum	McAnally-Hilgemann Racing	Chevrolet
19	Christian Eckes (CC)	McAnally-Hilgemann Racing	Chevrolet
22	Keith McGee	Reaume Brothers Racing	Ford
25	Dawson Sutton	Rackley W.A.R.	Chevrolet
27	Frankie Muniz	Reaume Brothers Racing	Ford
33	Lawless Alan	Reaume Brothers Racing	Ford
38	Layne Riggs (R)	Front Row Motorsports	Ford
41	Bayley Currey	Niece Motorsports	Chevrolet
42	Matt Mills	Niece Motorsports	Chevrolet
43	Daniel Dye	McAnally-Hilgemann Racing	Chevrolet
44	Stefan Parsons	Niece Motorsports	Chevrolet
45	Kaden Honeycutt	Niece Motorsports	Chevrolet
46	Thad Moffitt (R)	Young's Motorsports	Chevrolet
52	Stewart Friesen	Halmar Friesen Racing	Toyota
56	Timmy Hill	Hill Motorsports	Toyota
66	Conner Jones (R)	ThorSport Racing	Ford
71	Rajah Caruth	Spire Motorsports	Chevrolet
76	Spencer Boyd	Freedom Racing Enterprises	Chevrolet
77	Chase Purdy	Spire Motorsports	Chevrolet
88	Matt Crafton	ThorSport Racing	Ford
91	Jack Wood	McAnally-Hilgemann Racing	Chevrolet
98	Ty Majeski (CC)	ThorSport Racing	Ford
99	Ben Rhodes	ThorSport Racing	Ford
Official entry list

== Practice ==
The first and only practice session was held on Thursday, November 7, at 5:00 PM MST, and would last for 50 minutes. Corey Heim, driving for Tricon Garage, would set the fastest time in the session, with a lap of 26.285, and a speed of 136.960 mph (220.416 km/h).

Pos.	#	Driver	Team	Make	Time	Speed
1	11	Corey Heim (CC)	Tricon Garage	Toyota	26.285	136.960
2	9	Grant Enfinger (CC)	CR7 Motorsports	Chevrolet	26.390	136.415
3	98	Ty Majeski (CC)	ThorSport Racing	Ford	26.407	136.327
Full practice results

== Qualifying ==
Qualifying was held on Friday, November 8, at 2:05 PM MST. Since Phoenix Raceway is a mile oval, the qualifying system used is a single-car, one-lap system with only one round. Drivers will be on track by themselves and will have one lap to post a qualifying time, and whoever sets the fastest time will win the pole.

Ty Majeski, driving for ThorSport Racing, would score the pole for the race, with a lap of 26.053, and a speed of 138.180 mph (222.379 km/h).

No drivers would fail to qualify.

=== Qualifying results ===
Pos.	#	Driver	Team	Make	Time	Speed
1	98	Ty Majeski (CC)	ThorSport Racing	Ford	26.053	138.180
2	11	Corey Heim (CC)	Tricon Garage	Toyota	26.083	138.021
3	52	Stewart Friesen	Halmar Friesen Racing	Toyota	26.314	136.809
4	19	Christian Eckes (CC)	McAnally-Hilgemann Racing	Chevrolet	26.380	136.467
5	9	Grant Enfinger (CC)	CR7 Motorsports	Chevrolet	26.403	136.348
6	5	Dean Thompson	Tricon Garage	Toyota	26.480	135.952
7	2	Nick Sanchez	Rev Racing	Chevrolet	26.481	135.947
8	45	Kaden Honeycutt	Niece Motorsports	Chevrolet	26.487	135.916
9	7	Connor Mosack	Spire Motorsports	Chevrolet	26.491	135.895
10	77	Chase Purdy	Spire Motorsports	Chevrolet	26.492	135.890
11	38	Layne Riggs (R)	Front Row Motorsports	Ford	26.502	135.839
12	18	Tyler Ankrum	McAnally-Hilgemann Racing	Chevrolet	26.576	135.461
13	66	Conner Jones (R)	ThorSport Racing	Ford	26.627	135.201
14	17	Taylor Gray	Tricon Garage	Toyota	26.654	135.064
15	15	Tanner Gray	Tricon Garage	Toyota	26.654	135.064
16	43	Daniel Dye	Kaulig Racing	Chevrolet	26.658	135.044
17	1	William Sawalich	Tricon Garage	Toyota	26.677	134.948
18	41	Bayley Currey	Niece Motorsports	Chevrolet	26.700	134.831
19	71	Rajah Caruth	Spire Motorsports	Chevrolet	26.719	134.736
20	99	Ben Rhodes	ThorSport Racing	Ford	26.798	134.338
21	91	Jack Wood	McAnally-Hilgemann Racing	Chevrolet	26.802	134.318
22	88	Matt Crafton	ThorSport Racing	Ford	26.863	134.013
23	44	Stefan Parsons	Niece Motorsports	Chevrolet	26.905	133.804
24	4	Brett Moffitt	Hettinger Racing	Chevrolet	26.932	133.670
25	25	Dawson Sutton	Rackley W.A.R.	Chevrolet	26.943	133.615
26	04	Andrés Pérez de Lara	Roper Racing	Chevrolet	26.952	133.571
27	13	Jake Garcia	ThorSport Racing	Ford	27.198	132.363
28	42	Matt Mills	Niece Motorsports	Chevrolet	27.343	131.661
29	56	Timmy Hill	Hill Motorsports	Toyota	27.395	131.411
30	76	Spencer Boyd	Freedom Racing Enterprises	Chevrolet	27.650	130.199
31	27	Frankie Muniz	Reaume Brothers Racing	Ford	27.951	128.797
Qualified by owner's points
32	22	Keith McGee	Reaume Brothers Racing	Ford	28.092	128.150
33	02	Nathan Byrd	Young's Motorsports	Chevrolet	28.450	126.538
34	46	Thad Moffitt (R)	Young's Motorsports	Chevrolet	28.487	126.373
35	33	Lawless Alan	Reaume Brothers Racing	Ford	39.108	92.053
Official qualifying results
Official starting lineup

== Race results ==
Stage 1 Laps: 45

Pos.	#	Driver	Team	Make	Pts
1	11	Corey Heim (CC)	Tricon Garage	Toyota	0
2	98	Ty Majeski (CC)	ThorSport Racing	Ford	0
3	19	Christan Eckes (CC)	McAnally-Hilgemann Racing	Chevrolet	0
4	2	Nick Sanchez	Rev Racing	Chevrolet	7
5	9	Grant Enfinger (CC)	CR7 Motorsports	Chevrolet	0
6	5	Dean Thompson	Tricon Garage	Toyota	5
7	7	Connor Mosack	Spire Motorsports	Chevrolet	4
8	38	Layne Riggs (R)	Front Row Motorsports	Chevrolet	3
9	66	Conner Jones (R)	ThorSport Racing	Ford	2
10	52	Stewart Friesen	Halmar Friesen Racing	Toyota	1

Stage 2 Laps: 45

Pos.	#	Driver	Team	Make	Pts
1	98	Ty Majeski (CC)	ThorSport Racing	Ford	0
2	11	Corey Heim (CC)	Tricon Garage	Toyota	0
3	38	Layne Riggs (R)	Front Row Motorsports	Chevrolet	8
4	2	Nick Sanchez	Rev Racing	Chevrolet	7
5	19	Christan Eckes (CC)	McAnally-Hilgemann Racing	Chevrolet	0
6	7	Connor Mosack	Spire Motorsports	Chevrolet	5
7	9	Grant Enfinger (CC)	CR7 Motorsports	Chevrolet	0
8	17	Taylor Gray	Tricon Garage	Toyota	3
9	52	Stewart Friesen	Halmar Friesen Racing	Toyota	2
10	99	Ben Rhodes	ThorSport Racing	Ford	1

Stage 3 Laps: 60

Fin	St	#	Driver	Team	Make	Laps	Led	Status	Pts
1	1	98	Ty Majeski (CC)	ThorSport Racing	Ford	150	132	Running	40
2	2	11	Corey Heim (CC)	Tricon Garage	Toyota	150	16	Running	35
3	4	19	Christian Eckes (CC)	McAnally-Hilgemann Racing	Chevrolet	150	0	Running	34
4	7	2	Nick Sanchez	Rev Racing	Chevrolet	150	0	Running	47
5	5	9	Grant Enfinger (CC)	CR7 Motorsports	Chevrolet	150	2	Running	32
6	14	17	Taylor Gray	Tricon Garage	Toyota	150	0	Running	34
7	8	45	Kaden Honeycutt	Niece Motorsports	Chevrolet	150	0	Running	30
8	9	7	Connor Mosack	Spire Motorsports	Chevrolet	150	0	Running	38
9	20	99	Ben Rhodes	ThorSport Racing	Ford	150	0	Running	29
10	11	38	Layne Riggs (R)	Front Row Motorsports	Ford	150	0	Running	38
11	15	15	Tanner Gray	Tricon Garage	Toyota	150	0	Running	26
12	10	77	Chase Purdy	Spire Motorsports	Chevrolet	150	0	Running	25
13	19	71	Rajah Caruth	Spire Motorsports	Chevrolet	150	0	Running	24
14	27	13	Jake Garcia	ThorSport Racing	Ford	150	0	Running	23
15	6	5	Dean Thompson	Tricon Garage	Toyota	150	0	Running	27
16	24	4	Brett Moffitt	Hettinger Racing	Chevrolet	150	0	Running	21
17	13	66	Conner Jones (R)	ThorSport Racing	Ford	150	0	Running	22
18	3	52	Stewart Friesen	Halmar Friesen Racing	Toyota	150	0	Running	22
19	22	88	Matt Crafton	ThorSport Racing	Ford	150	0	Running	18
20	25	25	Dawson Sutton	Rackley W.A.R.	Chevrolet	150	0	Running	17
21	18	41	Bayley Currey	Niece Motorsports	Chevrolet	150	0	Running	16
22	29	56	Timmy Hill	Hill Motorsports	Toyota	150	0	Running	15
23	23	44	Stefan Parsons	Niece Motorsports	Chevrolet	149	0	Running	14
24	16	43	Daniel Dye	McAnally-Hilgemann Racing	Chevrolet	149	0	Running	13
25	28	42	Matt Mills	Niece Motorsports	Chevrolet	148	0	Running	12
26	33	02	Nathan Byrd	Young's Motorsports	Chevrolet	147	0	Running	11
27	34	46	Thad Moffitt (R)	Young's Motorsports	Chevrolet	147	0	Running	10
28	30	76	Spencer Boyd	Freedom Racing Enterprises	Chevrolet	146	0	Running	9
29	32	22	Keith McGee	Reaume Brothers Racing	Ford	146	0	Running	8
30	35	33	Lawless Alan	Reaume Brothers Racing	Ford	146	0	Running	7
31	26	04	Andrés Pérez de Lara	Roper Racing	Chevrolet	99	0	Accident	6
32	17	1	William Sawalich	Tricon Garage	Toyota	98	0	Accident	5
33	12	18	Tyler Ankrum	McAnally-Hilgemann Racing	Chevrolet	98	0	Accident	4
34	31	27	Frankie Muniz	Reaume Brothers Racing	Ford	95	0	Accident	3
35	21	91	Jack Wood	McAnally-Hilgemann Racing	Chevrolet	58	0	Accident	2
Official race results

== Standings after the race ==
Drivers' Championship standings

	Pos	Driver	Points
2	1	Ty Majeski	4,040
2	2	Corey Heim	4,035 (-5)
1	3	Christian Eckes	4,034 (–6)
3	4	Grant Enfinger	4,032 (–8)
	5	Nick Sanchez	2,280 (–1,760)
	6	Taylor Gray	2,247 (–1,793)
	7	Rajah Caruth	2,213 (–1,827)
	8	Tyler Ankrum	2,183 (–1,857)
1	9	Ben Rhodes	2,150 (–1,890)
1	10	Daniel Dye	2,141 (–1,899)
Official driver's standings

Manufacturers' Championship standings

Pos	Manufacturer	Points
1	Chevrolet	859
2	Toyota	804 (-55)
3	Ford	780 (–79)

- Note: Only the first 10 positions are included for the driver standings.

Previous race: 2024 Zip Buy Now, Pay Later 200	NASCAR Craftsman Truck Series; 2024 season	Next race: 2025 Fresh From Florida 250
