= Tyler Ankrum =

American racing driver (born 2001)

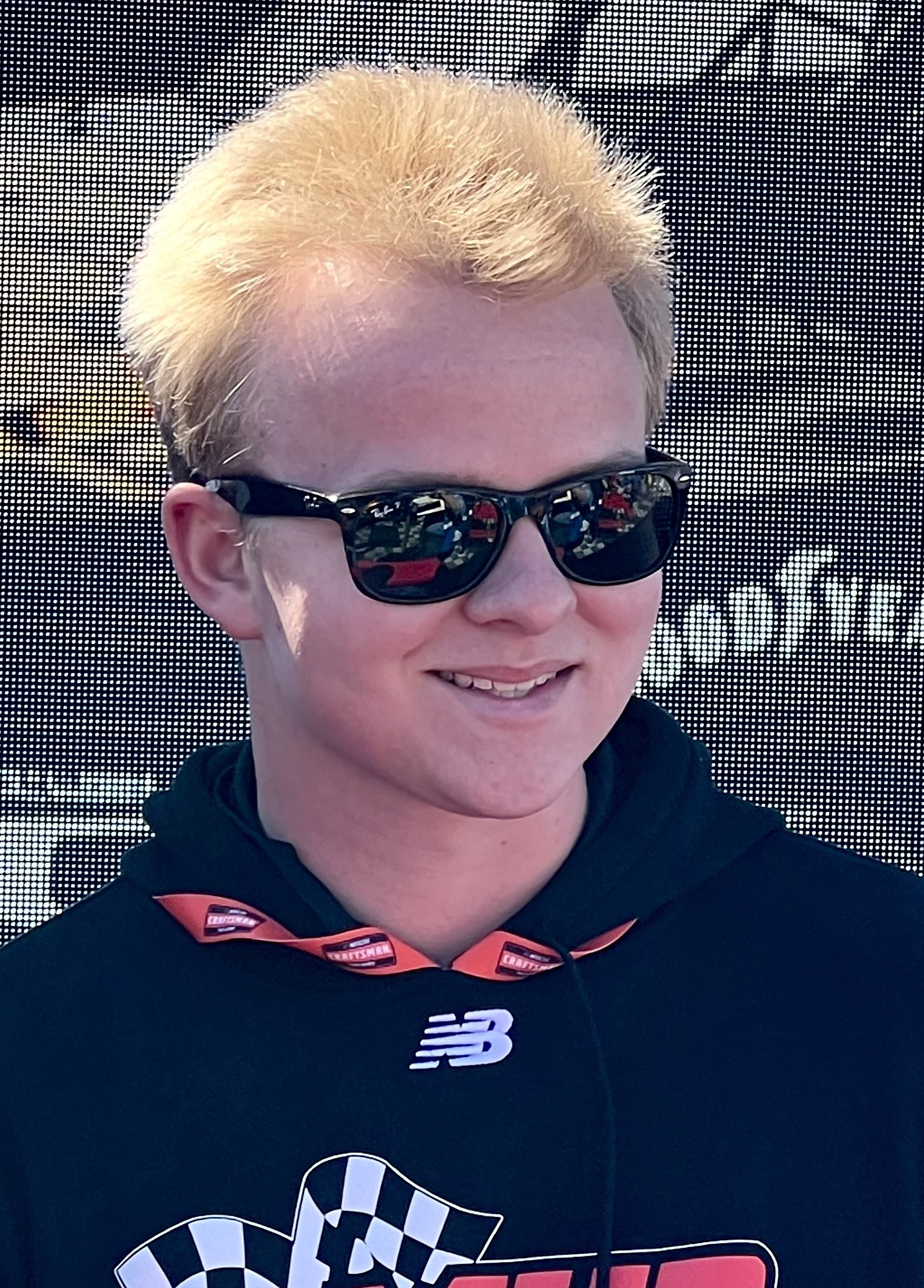
- Ankrum at Las Vegas Motor Speedway in 2024
- Born: Tyler Michael Ankrum; March 6, 2001 (age 25); San Bernardino, California, U.S.
- Achievements: 2018 NASCAR K&N Pro Series East Champion
- Awards: 2019 NASCAR Gander Outdoors Truck Series Rookie of the Year

NASCAR O'Reilly Auto Parts Series career
- 1 race run over 1 year
- 2026 position: 94th
- Best finish: 94th (2026)
- First race: 2026 Ag-Pro 300 (Talladega)
Wins	Top tens	Poles
0	0	0

NASCAR FedEx Freight Truck Series career
- 186 races run over 9 years
- 2026 position: 10th
- Best finish: 4th (2025)
- First race: 2018 Texas Roadhouse 200 (Martinsville)
- Last race: 2026 Craftsman 200 (Homestead)
- First win: 2019 Buckle Up in Your Truck 225 (Kentucky)
- Last win: 2025 Black's Tire 200 (Rockingham)
Wins	Top tens	Poles
2	72	1

ARCA Menards Series career
- 2 races run over 2 years
- Best finish: 65th (2023)
- First race: 2021 Clean Harbors 100 at The Glen (Watkins Glen)
- Last race: 2023 Zinsser SmartCoat 150 (Mid-Ohio)
- First win: 2023 Zinsser SmartCoat 150 (Mid-Ohio)
Wins	Top tens	Poles
1	1	0

ARCA Menards Series East career
- 14 races run over 1 year
- Best finish: 1st (2018)
- First race: 2018 New Smyrna 175 (New Smyrna)
- Last race: 2018 Crosley 125 (Dover)
- First win: 2018 Who's Your Driver Twin 100s (South Boston)
- Last win: 2018 Casey's General Store 150 (Iowa)
Wins	Top tens	Poles
4	12	1
- Statistics up to date as of November 7, 2026.

Tyler Michael Ankrum (born March 6, 2001) is an American professional stock car racing driver. He last competed full-time in the NASCAR Craftsman Truck Series, driving the No. 18 Chevrolet Silverado RST for McAnally–Hilgemann Racing, and part-time in the NASCAR O'Reilly Auto Parts Series, driving the No. 32 Chevrolet Camaro SS for Jordan Anderson Racing. Ankrum won the 2018 NASCAR K&N Pro Series East championship, earning DGR-Crosley's first championship in any racing series. Ankrum is the first driver born in the 21st century or later to win a NASCAR national series race.

== Racing career ==
Growing up on the west coast of America, Ankrum started racing quarter midgets and later moved up to late models. He won his first late model race at Caraway Speedway at the age of fourteen. Ankrum continues to run super late model races around the country, winning Hickory Motor Speedway's Fall Brawl in 2015 and finishing third in the 2018 Rattler 250. He switched to the super late model in late 2015 after one year running the CARS Tour in the Late Model Stock division.

=== K&N Pro Series East ===
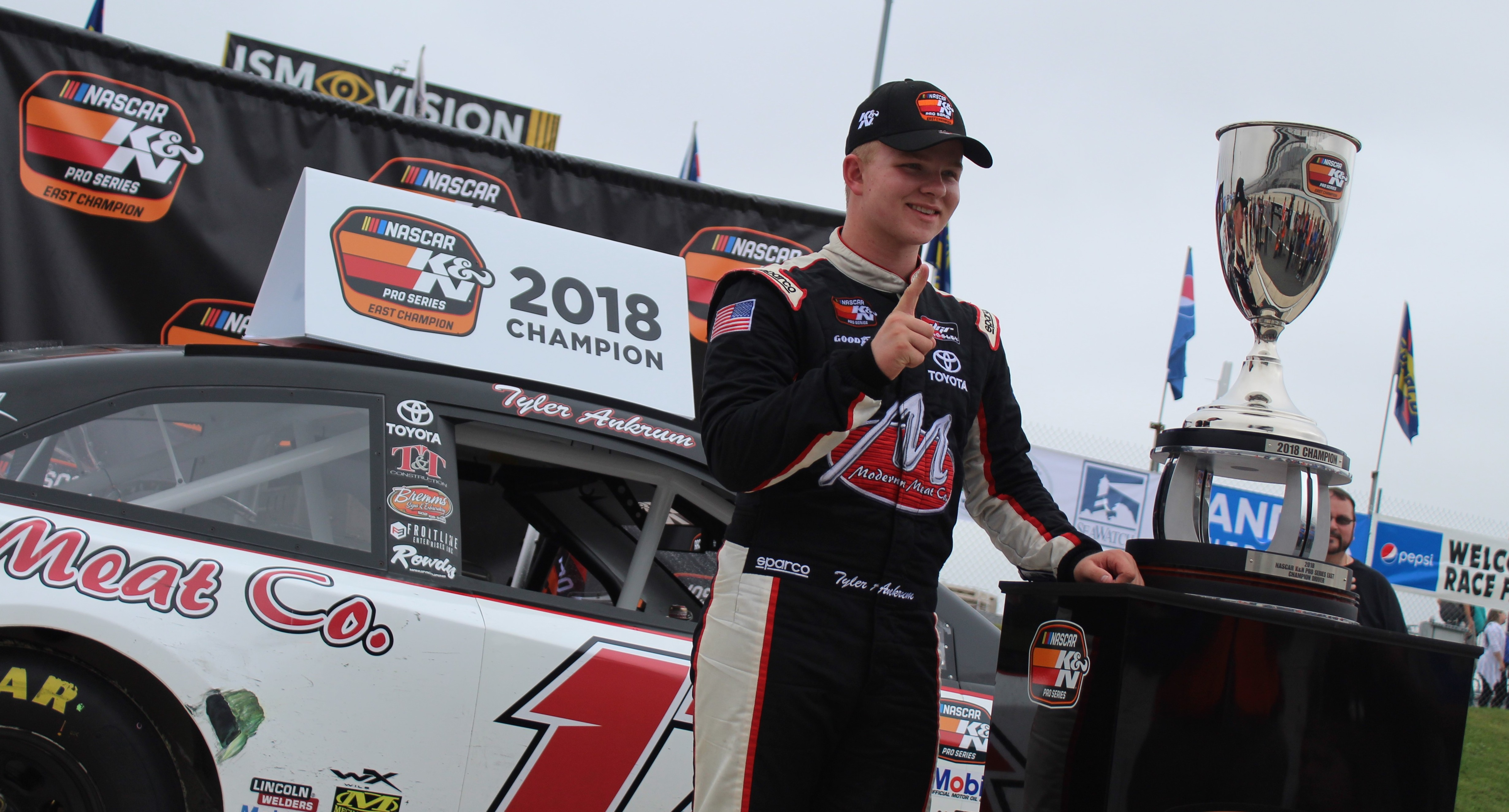
Ankrum after winning the 2018 NASCAR K&N Pro Series East Championship

In January 2018, Ankrum signed with David Gilliland Racing for half of the 2018 NASCAR K&N Pro Series East season. By the third race of the season, one more race was added with the potential for more with additional funding; it eventually morphed into a full-time effort. He won his first race in his fourth start at South Boston Speedway in May over teammate Tyler Dippel, and almost won the other race in the doubleheader that day if not for a run-in with Chase Cabre late in the second race. Ankrum then went on a midsummer tear, winning three consecutive K&N East races, at Thompson Speedway after failing post-qualifying tech; going flag-to-flag the following week in a caution-free race at New Hampshire Motor Speedway, and winning a combination east–west race at Iowa Speedway, which he called "overwhelming". Despite only finishing thirteenth at the September New Hampshire race, Ankrum left the event with an insurmountable points lead, clinching him the 2018 K&N Pro Series East championship.

=== Craftsman Truck Series ===
After winning the K&N Pro Series East championship, Ankrum would make his Truck Series debut at Martinsville in the No. 54 Toyota Tundra for DGR-Crosley. Seth Smith, Ankrum's K&N crew chief, served as crew chief for the effort. After starting nineteenth, Ankrum finished eighteenth. Ankrum ran the following race with DGR, notching his first top-ten finish in sixth at ISM Raceway.

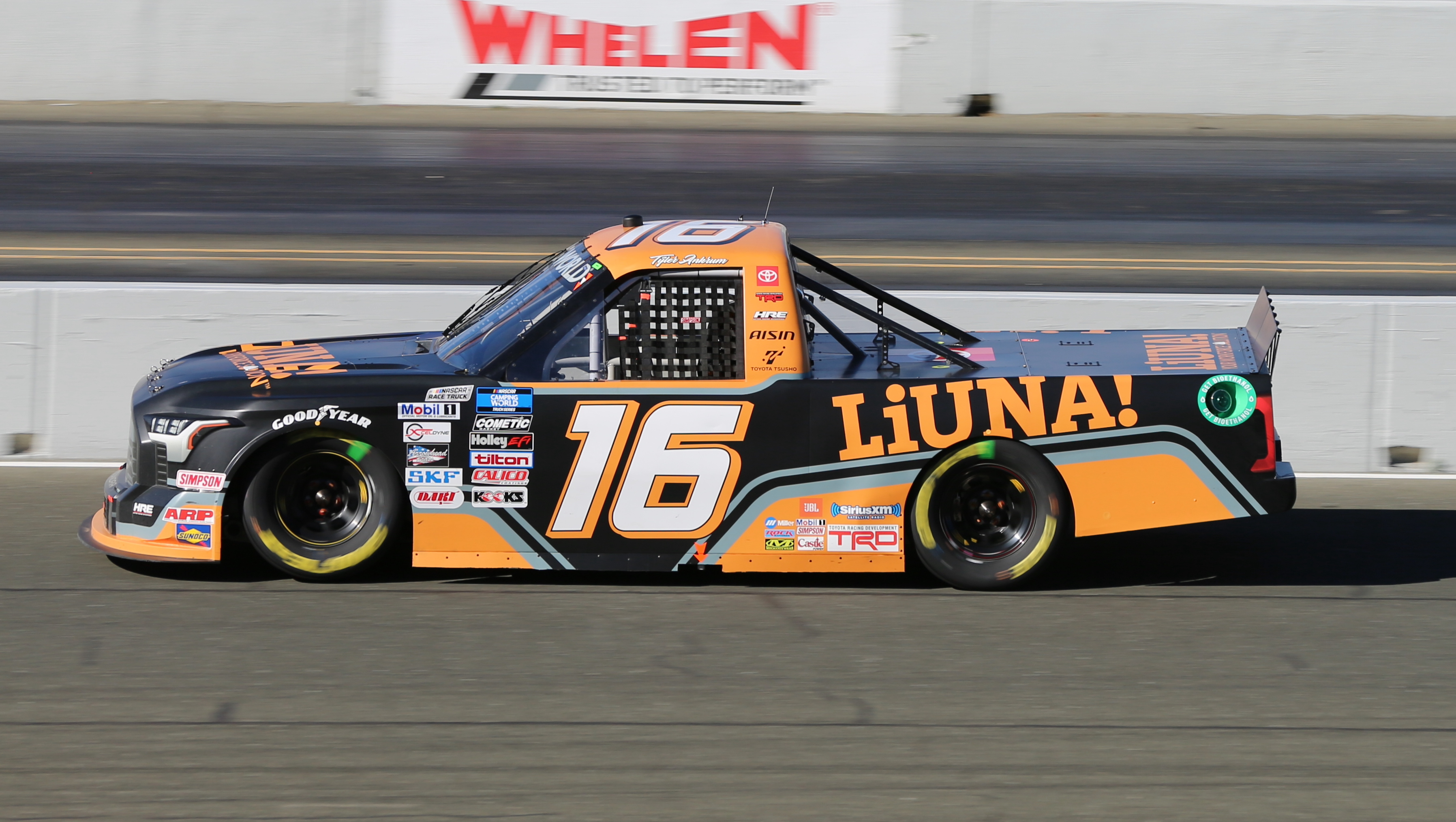
Ankrum's No. 16 truck at Sonoma Raceway in 2022

When asked in early November 2018 about 2019 plans, Ankrum noted that a lack of sponsorship would likely prevent him from running in the Truck Series full-time in 2019. He stated that his 2019 racing slate would include part-time rides in Trucks, the ARCA Racing Series, and in super late model racing. However, on December 14, 2018, Ankrum and DGR-Crosley announced that he would run full-time in 2019 starting with the spring Martinsville race due to age restrictions. At Texas in June, Ankrum graduated high school on a stage during pre-race ceremonies and then recovered from multiple incidents during the race, including a slide down pit road, to finish a career-best third. On June 11, 2019, Ankrum announced that sponsorship woes had put him out of the truck, with only a handful of races left in the season. He would eventually land a start and park ride with NEMCO Motorsports for races not on his DGR-Crosley schedule, allowing him to remain eligible for the playoffs. On July 11, 2019, Ankrum scored his first Truck Series win at Kentucky after Brett Moffitt ran out of fuel towards the final lap. This also marked DGR-Crosley's first Truck Series win. The win qualified him for the playoffs, but he did not advance past the Round of 6.

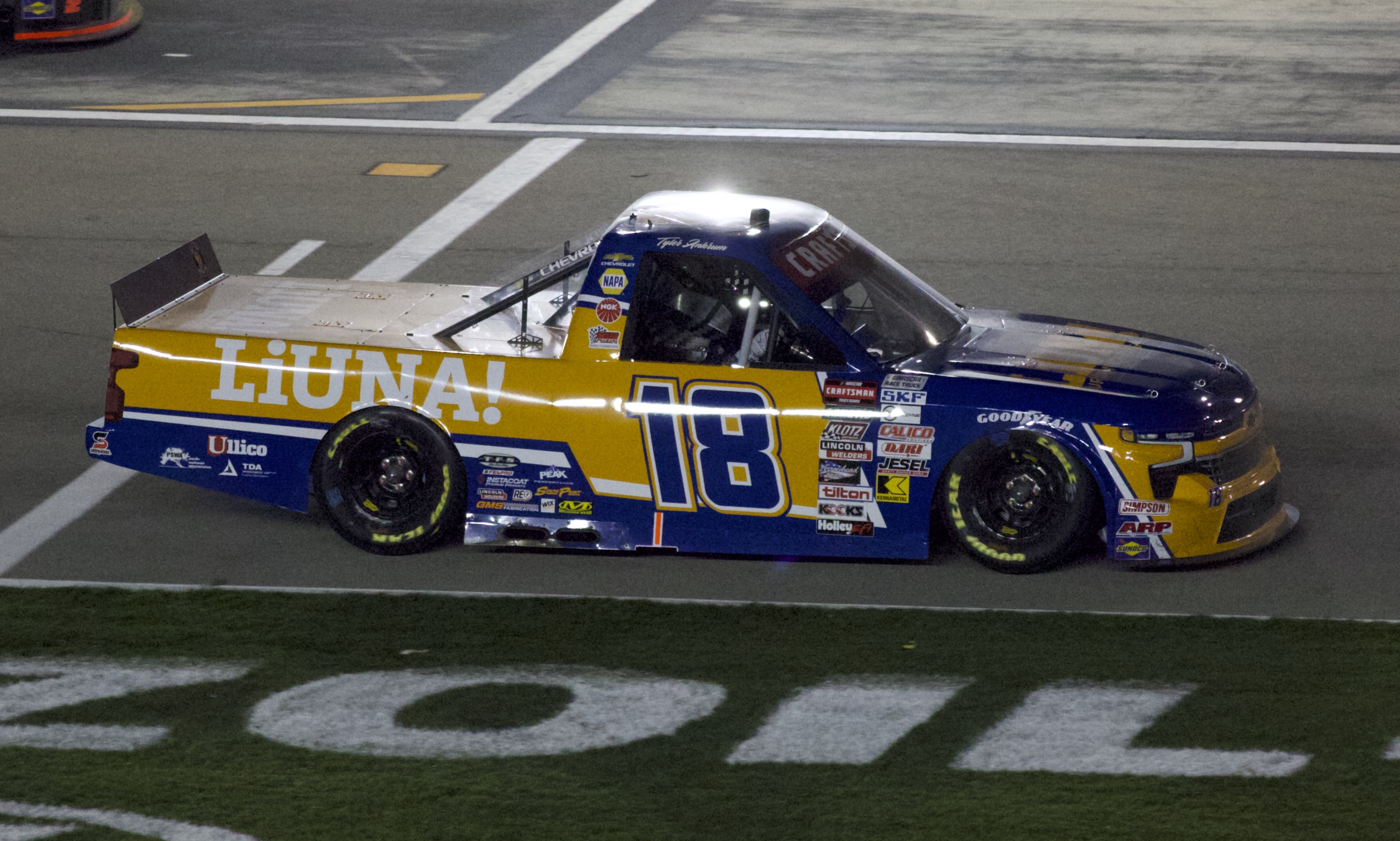
Ankrum's No. 18 truck at Las Vegas Motor Speedway in 2024.

On November 14, 2019, Ankrum joined GMS Racing for the 2020 Truck season.

In 2022, Ankrum would return to driving a Toyota team, this time the No. 16 Toyota for Hattori Racing Enterprises.

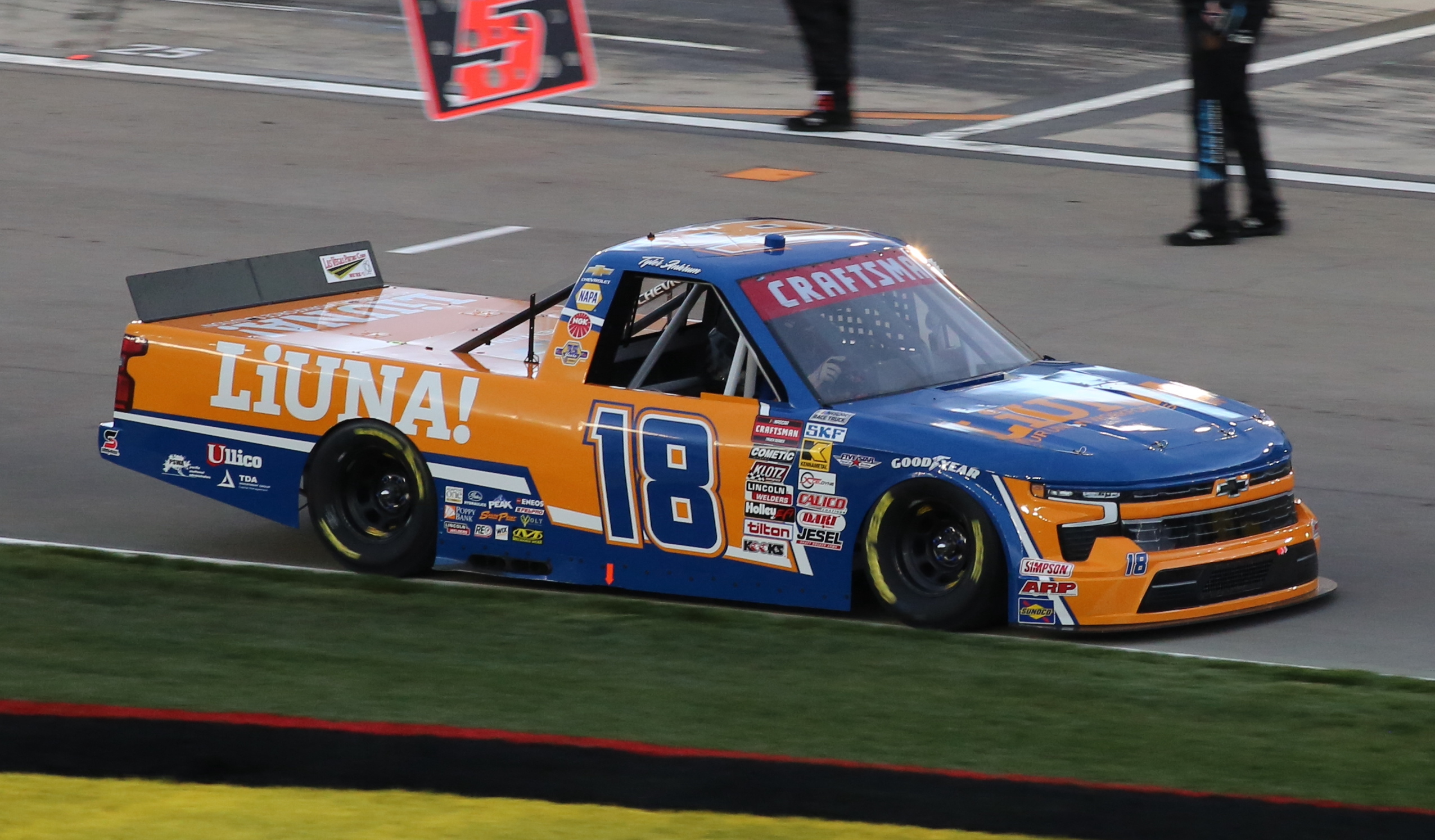
Ankrum's No. 18 truck at Las Vegas Motor Speedway in 2025.

On December 7, 2023, it was announced that Ankrum would move to McAnally–Hilgemann Racing for the 2024 season, running a newly renumbered 18 truck. Due to his consistency throughout the regular season, Ankrum would make the playoffs for the first time since 2020. Ankrum would be eliminated at the conclusion of the Round of 8 at Martinsville.

Ankrum started the 2025 season with a 34th-place DNF at Daytona. Two months later, he broke a 130-race winless drought (the longest in NCTS history) with a fuel mileage win in the Truck Series return to Rockingham.

Ankrum made the playoffs (renamed back to the Chase) again in 2026 on points despite not winning any races during the regular season.

On October 9, 2026, Ankrum announced that he would not return to the MHR No. 18 truck in 2027.

=== O'Reilly Auto Parts Series ===
On April 20, 2026, it was announced that Ankrum would make his NASCAR O'Reilly Auto Parts Series debut at Talladega, driving the No. 32 Chevrolet for Jordan Anderson Racing.

== Personal life ==
Ankrum is a native of San Bernardino, California. When he was young, he dreamed of being a professional bull rider like his childhood hero, Lane Frost. After his mom, Michelle, quickly turned down the idea, Ankrum quickly transitioned to wanting to be a professional golfer, after his father, who also dabbled in racing.

After growing up on a ranch in Southern California, Ankrum and his family moved to North Carolina for racing.

He attended Lake Norman High School in Mooresville, North Carolina, graduating in 2019.

After growing up on one, Ankrum now owns a 474-acre ranch and operates it on weekdays away from the racetrack.

== Motorsports career results ==
=== Racing career summary ===
Season	Series	Team	Races	Wins	Top 5	Top 10	Points	Position
2015	CARS Super Late Model Tour	Rick Ankrum	1	0	0	0	17	52nd
2015	CARS Late Model Stock Car Tour	Rick Ankrum	10	0	6	7	246	5th
2016	CARS Super Late Model Tour	Rick Ankrum	7	0	1	4	157	7th
2017	CARS Super Late Model Tour	Rick Ankrum	5	0	1	4	125	11th
2018	CARS Super Late Model Tour	Rick Ankrum	4	0	2	2	64	18th
2018	NASCAR K&N Pro Series East	DGR-Crosley	14	4	9	12	574	**1st**
2018	NASCAR Camping World Truck Series	DGR-Crosley	2	0	0	1	54	42nd
2019	NASCAR Gander Outdoors Truck Series	DGR-Crosley	18	1	3	8	2182	8th
2019	NASCAR Gander Outdoors Truck Series	NEMCO Motorsports	2	0	0	0	2182	8th
2020	NASCAR Gander Outdoors Truck Series	GMS Racing	23	0	3	10	2198	9th
2021	ARCA Menards Series	Cook-Finley Racing	1	0	0	0	22	108th
2021	NASCAR Camping World Truck Series	GMS Racing	23	0	3	5	432	15th
2022	NASCAR Camping World Truck Series	Hattori Racing Enterprises	23	0	0	8	583	12th
2023	CARS Late Model Stock Car Tour	N/A	1	0	0	0	9	78th
2023	ARCA Menards Series	Hattori Racing Enterprises	1	1	1	1	48	65th
2023	NASCAR Craftsman Truck Series	Hattori Racing Enterprises	23	0	1	6	456	17th
2024	NASCAR Craftsman Truck Series	McAnally–Hilgemann Racing	23	0	6	12	2183	8th
2025	NASCAR Craftsman Truck Series	McAnally–Hilgemann Racing	25	1	8	15	4023	4th
2026	NASCAR Craftsman Truck Series	McAnally–Hilgemann Racing	25	0	2	8	2196	10th
2026	NASCAR O'Reilly Auto Parts Series	Jordan Anderson Racing	1	0	0	0	0	NC†

^{†} As Ankrum was a guest driver, he was ineligible for championship points.

=== NASCAR ===
(key) (Bold – Pole position awarded by qualifying time. Italics – Pole position earned by points standings or practice time. * – Most laps led. ** – All laps led.)

==== O'Reilly Auto Parts Series ====
NASCAR O'Reilly Auto Parts Series results
Year	Team	No.	Make	1	2	3	4	5	6	7	8	9	10	11	12	13	14	15	16	17	18	19	20	21	22	23	24	25	26	27	28	29	30	31	32	33	NOAPSC	Pts	Ref
2026	Jordan Anderson Racing	32	Chevy	DAY	ATL	COA	PHO	LVS	DAR	MAR	CAR	BRI	KAN	TAL; 32	TEX	GLN	DOV	CLT	NSH	POC	COR	SON	CHI	ATL	IND	IOW	DAY	DAR	GTW	BRI	LVS	CLT	PHO	TAL	MAR	HOM	94th	0^{1}	

==== Craftsman Truck Series ====
NASCAR Craftsman Truck Series results
Year	Team	No.	Make	1	2	3	4	5	6	7	8	9	10	11	12	13	14	15	16	17	18	19	20	21	22	23	24	25	NCTC	Pts	Ref
2018	DGR-Crosley	54	Toyota	DAY	ATL	LVS	MAR	DOV	KAN	CLT	TEX	IOW	GTW	CHI	KEN	ELD	POC	MCH	BRI	MSP	LVS	TAL	MAR; 18	TEX					42nd	54	
2018	DGR-Crosley	17	Toyota																						PHO; 6	HOM			42nd	54	
2019	DGR-Crosley	17	Toyota	DAY	ATL	LVS	MAR; 19	TEX; 6	DOV; 9	KAN; 11	CLT; 27	TEX; 3			CHI; 13	KEN; 1*	POC; 2	ELD; 9	MCH; 25	BRI; 20	MSP; 9	LVS; 11	TAL; 7	MAR; 25	PHO; 26	HOM; 22			8th	2182	
2019	NEMCO Motorsports	87	Chevy										IOW; 31	GTW; 30															8th	2182	
2020	GMS Racing	26	Chevy	DAY; 27	LVS; 11	CLT; 13	ATL; 15	HOM; 2	POC; 9	KEN; 16	TEX; 6	KAN; 33	KAN; 28	MCH; 4	DRC; 6	DOV; 7	GTW; 12	DAR; 11	RCH; 5	BRI; 7	LVS; 10	TAL; 16	KAN; 34	TEX; 16	MAR; 12	PHO; 8			9th	2198	
2021	GMS Racing	26	Chevy	DAY; 28	DRC; 21	LVS; 34	ATL; 18	BRD; 40	RCH; 3	KAN; 15	DAR; 14	**COA**; 3	CLT; 16	TEX; 8	NSH; 23	POC; 4	KNX; 17	GLN; 7	GTW; 32	DAR; 18	BRI; 32	LVS; 34	TAL; 28	MAR; 26	PHO; 14				15th	432	
2022	Hattori Racing Enterprises	16	Toyota	DAY; 28	LVS; 16	ATL; 11	COA; 7	MAR; 10	BRD; 31	DAR; 9	KAN; 16	TEX; 33	CLT; 20	GTW; 13	SON; 9	KNX; 9	NSH; 7	MOH; 21	POC; 16	IRP; 6	RCH; 13	KAN; 14	BRI; 11	TAL; 10	HOM; 11	PHO; 14			12th	583	
2023	Hattori Racing Enterprises	16	Toyota	DAY; 7	LVS; 15	ATL; 26	COA; 4	TEX; 26	BRD; 33	MAR; 27	KAN; 10	DAR; 15	NWS; 26	CLT; 28	GTW; 16	NSH; 8	MOH; 10	POC; 12	RCH; 13	IRP; 34	MLW; 20	KAN; 9	BRI; 23	TAL; 33	HOM; 25	PHO; 22			17th	456	
2024	McAnally–Hilgemann Racing	18	Chevy	DAY; 11	ATL; 7*	LVS; 2	BRI; 5	COA; 25	MAR; 5	TEX; 34	KAN; 20	DAR; 26	NWS; 8	CLT; 32	GTW; 15	NSH; 5	POC; 14	IRP; 4	RCH; 6	MLW; 6	BRI; 10	KAN; 14	TAL; 14	HOM; 5	MAR; 8	PHO; 33			8th	2183	
2025	McAnally–Hilgemann Racing	18	Chevy	DAY; 34	ATL; 3	LVS; 10	HOM; 4	MAR; 2	BRI; 4	CAR; 1	TEX; 4	KAN; 16	NWS; 3	CLT; 12	NSH; 17	MCH; 24	POC; 26	LRP; 10	IRP; 8	GLN; 5	RCH; 11	DAR; 7	BRI; 20	NHA; 11	ROV; 9	TAL; 6	MAR; 9	PHO; 14	4th	4023	
2026	McAnally–Hilgemann Racing	18	Chevy	DAY; 9	ATL; 14	STP; 31	DAR; 24	CAR; 6	BRI; 13	TEX; 15	GLN; 17	DOV; 25	CLT; 20	NSH; 5	MCH; 10	COR; 31	LRP; 25	NWS; 19	IRP; 9	RCH; 11	NHA; 16	BRI; 13	KAN; 25	CLT; 9	PHO; 13	TAL; 2	MAR; 7	HOM; 34	10th	2196	

^{*} Season still in progress
^{1} Ineligible for series points

=== ARCA Menards Series ===
(key) (Bold – Pole position awarded by qualifying time. Italics – Pole position earned by points standings or practice time. * – Most laps led.)

ARCA Menards Series results
Year	Team	No.	Make	1	2	3	4	5	6	7	8	9	10	11	12	13	14	15	16	17	18	19	20	AMSC	Pts	Ref
2021	Cook-Finley Racing	42	Chevy	DAY	PHO	TAL	KAN	TOL	CLT	MOH	POC	ELK	BLN	IOW	WIN	GLN; 22	MCH	ISF	MLW	DSF	BRI	SLM	KAN	108th	22	
2023	Hattori Racing Enterprises	61	Toyota	DAY	PHO	TAL	KAN	CLT	BLN	ELK	MOH; 1*	IOW	POC	MCH	IRP	GLN	ISF	MLW	DSF	KAN	BRI	SLM	TOL	65th	48	

==== K&N Pro Series East ====
NASCAR K&N Pro Series East results
Year	Team	No.	Make	1	2	3	4	5	6	7	8	9	10	11	12	13	14	NKNPSEC	Pts	Ref
2018	DGR-Crosley	17	Toyota	NSM; 5	BRI; 4	LGY; 3	SBO; 1*	SBO; 3	**MEM**; 2	NJM; 9	TMP; 1	NHA; 1**	IOW; 1	GLN; 7	GTW; 6	NHA; 13	DOV; 11	1st	574	

=== CARS Late Model Stock Car Tour ===
(key) (Bold – Pole position awarded by qualifying time. Italics – Pole position earned by points standings or practice time. * – Most laps led. ** – All laps led.)

CARS Late Model Stock Car Tour results
Year	Team	No.	Make	1	2	3	4	5	6	7	8	9	10	11	12	13	14	15	16	CLMSCTC	Pts	Ref
2015	Rick Ankrum	58	Ford	SNM; 5	ROU; 28	**HCY**; 5	SNM; 2	TCM; 18	MMS; 9	ROU; 3	CON; 17	MYB; 5	HCY; 3							5th	246	
2023	N/A	98	Toyota	SNM	FLC	HCY	ACE	NWS; 24	LGY	DOM	CRW	HCY	ACE	TCM	WKS	AAS	SBO	TCM	CRW	78th	9	

=== CARS Super Late Model Tour ===
(key)

CARS Super Late Model Tour results
Year	Team	No.	Make	1	2	3	4	5	6	7	8	9	10	11	12	13	CSLMTC	Pts	Ref
2015	Rick Ankrum	58	N/A	SNM	ROU	HCY	SNM	TCM	MMS	ROU	CON	MYB	HCY; 16				52nd	17	
2016	Rick Ankrum	58	Ford	SNM; 22		HCY; 15	TCM; 6	GRE; 11	ROU; 8	CON							7th	157	
2016	Rick Ankrum	58	Chevy		ROU; 7						MYB; 5	HCY	SNM				7th	157	
2017	Rick Ankrum	58	Chevy	CON; 10	DOM	DOM	HCY	HCY				TCM; 7	ROU	HCY; 5	CON; 10	SBO	11th	125	
2017	Rick Ankrum	58A	Chevy						BRI; 8	AND	ROU						11th	125	
2018	Rick Ankrum	58	Toyota	MYB	NSH; 40	ROU; 5	HCY			HCY; 25	ROU	SBO					18th	64	
2018	Rick Ankrum	58A	Toyota					BRI; 5	AND								18th	64	

Sporting positions
Preceded by Harrison Burton	K&N Pro Series East Champion; 2018	Succeeded by Sam Mayer
