= 2025 Fr8 208 =

2nd race of the 2025 NASCAR Craftsman Truck Series

Race details
- Race 2 of 25 of the 2025 NASCAR Craftsman Truck Series
- Date: February 22, 2025
- Location: Atlanta Motor Speedway in Hampton, Georgia
- Course: Permanent racing facility
- Course length: 1.54 miles (2.48 km)
- Distance: 135 laps, 208 mi (334 km)
- Scheduled distance: 135 laps, 208 mi (334 km)
- Average speed: 116.725 mph (187.851 km/h)

Pole position
Driver	Connor Mosack	McAnally-Hilgemann Racing
- Time: 31.969

Most laps led
Driver	Kyle Busch	Spire Motorsports
- Laps: 80

Winner
No. 7	Kyle Busch	Spire Motorsports

Television in the United States
- Network: FS1
- Announcers: Jamie Little, Joey Logano, and Brad Keselowski

Radio in the United States
- Radio: NRN

The 2025 Fr8 208 was the 2nd stock car race of the 2025 NASCAR Craftsman Truck Series, and the 17th iteration of the event. The race was held on Saturday, February 22, 2025, at Atlanta Motor Speedway in Hampton, Georgia, a 1.54 miles (2.48 km) permanent asphalt quad-oval shaped intermediate speedway (with superspeedway rules). The race took the scheduled 135 laps to complete.

Kyle Busch, driving for Spire Motorsports, would hold off Stewart Friesen in a close finish, and ultimately put on a dominating performance, winning the second stage and leading a race-high 80 laps to earn his 67th NASCAR Craftsman Truck Series win, and his first of the season. To fill out the podium, Tyler Ankrum, driving for McAnally-Hilgemann Racing, would finish in 3rd, respectively.

This race also saw the debut of a new radio network, the NASCAR Racing Network (NRN), a collaboration between Motor Racing Network (who previously broadcast the entire Truck Series schedule on the radio) and Performance Racing Network, to broadcast the entire Truck Series schedule starting at this race.

== Report ==
=== Background ===
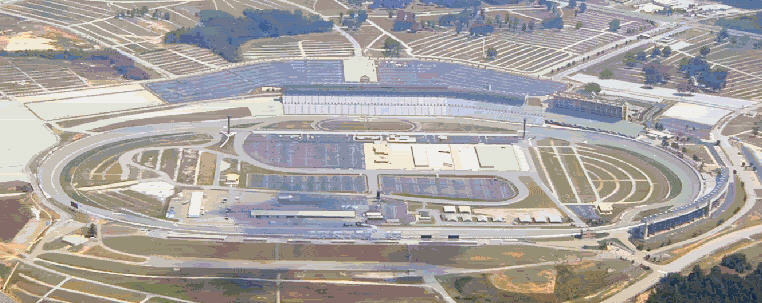
Atlanta Motor Speedway, the track where the race was held.

Atlanta Motor Speedway is a 1.54-mile race track in Hampton, Georgia, United States, 20 miles (32 km) south of Atlanta. It has annually hosted NASCAR Craftsman Truck Series stock car races since 2004.

The venue was bought by Speedway Motorsports in 1990. In 1994, 46 condominiums were built over the northeastern side of the track. In 1997, to standardize the track with Speedway Motorsports' other two intermediate ovals, the entire track was almost completely rebuilt. The frontstretch and backstretch were swapped, and the configuration of the track was changed from oval to quad-oval, with a new official length of 1.54-mile (2.48 km) where before it was 1.522-mile (2.449 km). The project made the track one of the fastest on the NASCAR circuit. In July 2021 NASCAR announced that the track would be reprofiled for the 2022 season to have 28 degrees of banking and would be narrowed from 55 to 40 feet which the track claims will turn racing at the track similar to restrictor plate superspeedways. Despite the reprofiling being criticized by drivers, construction began in August 2021 and wrapped up in December 2021. The track has seating capacity of 71,000 to 125,000 people depending on the tracks configuration.

==== Entry list ====
- (R) denotes rookie driver.
- (i) denotes driver who is ineligible for series driver points.

#	Driver	Team	Make
1	William Sawalich (i)	Tricon Garage	Toyota
02	Nathan Byrd	Young's Motorsports	Chevrolet
2	Keith McGee	Reaume Brothers Racing	Ford
5	Toni Breidinger (R)	Tricon Garage	Toyota
07	Michael McDowell (i)	Spire Motorsports	Chevrolet
7	Kyle Busch (i)	Spire Motorsports	Chevrolet
9	Grant Enfinger	CR7 Motorsports	Chevrolet
11	Corey Heim	Tricon Garage	Toyota
13	Jake Garcia	ThorSport Racing	Ford
15	Tanner Gray	Tricon Garage	Toyota
17	Gio Ruggiero (R)	Tricon Garage	Toyota
18	Tyler Ankrum	McAnally-Hilgemann Racing	Chevrolet
19	Daniel Hemric	McAnally-Hilgemann Racing	Chevrolet
22	Josh Reaume	Reaume Brothers Racing	Ford
26	Dawson Sutton (R)	Rackley W.A.R.	Chevrolet
33	Frankie Muniz (R)	Reaume Brothers Racing	Ford
34	Layne Riggs	Front Row Motorsports	Ford
38	Chandler Smith	Front Row Motorsports	Ford
42	Matt Mills	Niece Motorsports	Chevrolet
44	Bayley Currey	Niece Motorsports	Chevrolet
45	Kaden Honeycutt	Niece Motorsports	Chevrolet
52	Stewart Friesen	Halmar Friesen Racing	Toyota
66	Luke Fenhaus	ThorSport Racing	Ford
71	Rajah Caruth	Spire Motorsports	Chevrolet
76	Spencer Boyd	Freedom Racing Enterprises	Chevrolet
77	Andrés Pérez de Lara (R)	Spire Motorsports	Chevrolet
81	Connor Mosack (R)	McAnally-Hilgemann Racing	Chevrolet
88	Matt Crafton	ThorSport Racing	Ford
90	Justin Carroll	TC Motorsports	Toyota
91	Jack Wood	McAnally-Hilgemann Racing	Chevrolet
98	Ty Majeski	ThorSport Racing	Ford
99	Ben Rhodes	ThorSport Racing	Ford
Official entry list

== Qualifying ==
Qualifying was held on Friday, February 21, at 3:05 PM EST. Since Atlanta Motor Speedway is an intermediate track with superspeedway rules, the qualifying procedure used is a single-car, single-lap system with two rounds. In the first round, drivers have one lap to set a time and determine positions 11-32. The fastest ten drivers from the first round will advance to the second round, and whoever sets the fastest time in Round 2 will win the pole and determine the rest of the starting lineup.

Connor Mosack, driving for McAnally-Hilgemann Racing, would win the pole after advancing from the preliminary round and setting the fastest time in Round 2, with a lap of 31.969, and a speed of 173.418 mph (279.089 km/h).

No drivers would fail to qualify.

=== Qualifying results ===
Pos.	#	Driver	Team	Make	Time (R1)	Speed (R1)	Time (R2)	Speed (R2)
1	81	Connor Mosack (R)	McAnally-Hilgemann Racing	Chevrolet	32.027	173.104	31.969	173.418
2	9	Grant Enfinger	CR7 Motorsports	Chevrolet	32.152	172.431	32.045	173.007
3	19	Daniel Hemric	McAnally-Hilgemann Racing	Chevrolet	32.011	173.190	32.061	172.920
4	71	Rajah Caruth	Spire Motorsports	Chevrolet	32.109	172.662	32.122	172.592
5	91	Jack Wood	McAnally-Hilgemann Racing	Chevrolet	32.101	172.705	32.132	172.538
6	13	Jake Garcia	ThorSport Racing	Ford	32.103	172.694	32.145	172.469
7	18	Tyler Ankrum	McAnally-Hilgemann Racing	Chevrolet	32.170	172.334	32.155	172.415
8	52	Stewart Friesen	Halmar Friesen Racing	Toyota	32.132	172.538	32.179	172.286
9	7	Kyle Busch (i)	Spire Motorsports	Chevrolet	32.153	172.426	32.189	172.233
10	99	Ben Rhodes	ThorSport Racing	Ford	32.194	172.206	32.194	172.206
Eliminated in Round 1
11	88	Matt Crafton	ThorSport Racing	Ford	32.211	172.115	—	—
12	98	Ty Majeski	ThorSport Racing	Ford	32.236	171.982	—	—
13	66	Luke Fenhaus	ThorSport Racing	Ford	32.236	171.982	—	—
14	77	Andrés Pérez de Lara (R)	Spire Motorsports	Chevrolet	32.284	171.726	—	—
15	26	Dawson Sutton (R)	Rackley W.A.R.	Chevrolet	32.291	171.689	—	—
16	34	Layne Riggs	Front Row Motorsports	Ford	32.303	171.625	—	—
17	07	Michael McDowell (i)	Spire Motorsports	Chevrolet	32.317	171.551	—	—
18	5	Toni Breidinger (R)	Tricon Garage	Toyota	32.400	171.111	—	—
19	11	Corey Heim	Tricon Garage	Toyota	32.403	171.095	—	—
20	02	Nathan Byrd	Young's Motorsports	Chevrolet	32.431	170.948	—	—
21	33	Frankie Muniz (R)	Reaume Brothers Racing	Ford	32.470	170.742	—	—
22	17	Gio Ruggiero (R)	Tricon Garage	Toyota	32.477	170.705	—	—
23	1	William Sawalich (i)	Tricon Garage	Toyota	32.477	170.705	—	—
24	42	Matt Mills	Niece Motorsports	Chevrolet	32.499	170.590	—	—
25	45	Kaden Honeycutt	Niece Motorsports	Chevrolet	32.626	169.926	—	—
26	15	Tanner Gray	Tricon Garage	Toyota	32.641	169.848	—	—
27	76	Spencer Boyd	Freedom Racing Enterprises	Chevrolet	32.699	169.546	—	—
28	38	Chandler Smith	Front Row Motorsports	Ford	32.707	169.505	—	—
29	22	Josh Reaume	Reaume Brothers Racing	Ford	33.261	166.682	—	—
30	44	Bayley Currey	Niece Motorsports	Chevrolet	—	—	—	—
31	2	Keith McGee	Reaume Brothers Racing	Ford	—	—	—	—
Qualified by owner's points
32	90	Justin Carroll	TC Motorsports	Toyota	—	—	—	—
Official qualifying results
Official starting lineup

== Race results ==
Stage 1 Laps: 30

Pos.	#	Driver	Team	Make	Pts
1	91	Jack Wood	McAnally-Hilgemann Racing	Chevrolet	10
2	34	Layne Riggs	Front Row Motorsports	Ford	9
3	9	Grant Enfinger	CR7 Motorsports	Chevrolet	8
4	81	Connor Mosack (R)	McAnally-Hilgemann Racing	Chevrolet	7
5	7	Kyle Busch (i)	Spire Motorsports	Chevrolet	0
6	11	Corey Heim	Tricon Garage	Toyota	5
7	52	Stewart Friesen	Halmar Friesen Racing	Toyota	4
8	18	Tyler Ankrum	McAnally-Hilgemann Racing	Chevrolet	3
9	19	Daniel Hemric	McAnally-Hilgemann Racing	Chevrolet	2
10	71	Rajah Caruth	Spire Motorsports	Chevrolet	1

Stage 2 Laps: 30

Pos.	#	Driver	Team	Make	Pts
1	7	Kyle Busch (i)	Spire Motorsports	Chevrolet	0
2	98	Ty Majeski	ThorSport Racing	Ford	9
3	9	Grant Enfinger	CR7 Motorsports	Chevrolet	8
4	07	Michael McDowell (i)	Spire Motorsports	Chevrolet	0
5	45	Kaden Honeycutt	Niece Motorsports	Chevrolet	6
6	91	Jack Wood	McAnally-Hilgemann Racing	Chevrolet	5
7	81	Connor Mosack (R)	McAnally-Hilgemann Racing	Chevrolet	4
8	52	Stewart Friesen	Halmar Friesen Racing	Toyota	3
9	38	Chandler Smith	Front Row Motorsports	Ford	2
10	19	Daniel Hemric	McAnally-Hilgemann Racing	Chevrolet	1

Stage 3 Laps: 75

Fin	St	#	Driver	Team	Make	Laps	Led	Status	Pts
1	9	7	Kyle Busch (i)	Spire Motorsports	Chevrolet	135	80	Running	0
2	8	52	Stewart Friesen	Halmar Friesen Racing	Toyota	135	1	Running	43
3	7	18	Tyler Ankrum	McAnally-Hilgemann Racing	Chevrolet	135	0	Running	38
4	30	44	Bayley Currey	Niece Motorsports	Chevrolet	135	0	Running	33
5	28	38	Chandler Smith	Front Row Motorsports	Ford	135	2	Running	34
6	25	45	Kaden Honeycutt	Niece Motorsports	Chevrolet	135	0	Running	37
7	10	99	Ben Rhodes	ThorSport Racing	Ford	135	0	Running	30
8	12	98	Ty Majeski	ThorSport Racing	Ford	135	1	Running	38
9	6	13	Jake Garcia	ThorSport Racing	Ford	135	0	Running	28
10	2	9	Grant Enfinger	CR7 Motorsports	Chevrolet	135	1	Running	44
11	22	17	Gio Ruggiero (R)	Tricon Garage	Toyota	135	0	Running	26
12	17	07	Michael McDowell (i)	Spire Motorsports	Chevrolet	135	0	Running	0
13	24	42	Matt Mills	Niece Motorsports	Chevrolet	135	0	Running	24
14	13	66	Luke Fenhaus	ThorSport Racing	Ford	135	2	Running	23
15	26	15	Tanner Gray	Tricon Garage	Toyota	135	0	Running	23
16	3	19	Daniel Hemric	McAnally-Hilgemann Racing	Chevrolet	135	1	Running	25
17	15	26	Dawson Sutton (R)	Rackley W.A.R.	Chevrolet	135	0	Running	20
18	29	22	Josh Reaume	Reaume Brothers Racing	Ford	135	0	Running	19
19	27	76	Spencer Boyd	Freedom Racing Enterprises	Chevrolet	135	0	Running	18
20	16	34	Layne Riggs	Front Row Motorsports	Ford	134	0	Running	17
21	5	91	Jack Wood	McAnally-Hilgemann Racing	Chevrolet	133	4	Running	31
22	11	88	Matt Crafton	ThorSport Racing	Ford	133	0	Running	15
23	19	11	Corey Heim	Tricon Garage	Toyota	132	5	Running	20
24	18	5	Toni Breidinger (R)	Tricon Garage	Toyota	132	0	Running	13
25	1	81	Connor Mosack (R)	McAnally-Hilgemann Racing	Chevrolet	131	30	Running	24
26	21	33	Frankie Muniz (R)	Reaume Brothers Racing	Ford	106	0	Accident	11
27	14	77	Andrés Pérez de Lara (R)	Spire Motorsports	Chevrolet	96	0	Suspension	10
28	32	90	Justin Carroll	TC Motorsports	Toyota	75	0	Engine	9
29	4	71	Rajah Caruth	Spire Motorsports	Chevrolet	74	8	Accident	10
30	23	1	William Sawalich (i)	Tricon Garage	Toyota	74	0	Accident	0
31	20	02	Nathan Byrd	Young's Motorsports	Chevrolet	73	0	Accident	6
32	31	2	Keith McGee	Reaume Brothers Racing	Ford	43	0	Electrical	5
Official race results

== Standings after the race ==
Drivers' Championship standings

	Pos	Driver	Points
3	1	Grant Enfinger	85
	2	Ty Majeski	84 (-1)
	3	Chandler Smith	79 (–6)
3	4	Corey Heim	69 (–16)
2	5	Ben Rhodes	66 (–19)
	6	Gio Ruggiero	62 (–23)
12	7	Stewart Friesen	62 (–23)
3	8	Daniel Hemric	62 (–23)
3	9	Jake Garcia	53 (–32)
10	10	Jack Wood	50 (–35)
Official driver's standings

Manufacturers' Championship standings

	Pos	Manufacturer	Points
	1	Toyota	75
1	2	Chevrolet	73 (-2)
1	3	Ford	66 (–9)

- Note: Only the first 10 positions are included for the driver standings.

Previous race: 2025 Fresh From Florida 250	NASCAR Craftsman Truck Series; 2025 season	Next race: 2025 Ecosave 200
