= 2025 Fresh From Florida 250 =

1st race of the 2025 NASCAR Craftsman Truck Series

Race details
- Race 1 of 25 of the 2025 NASCAR Craftsman Truck Series
- Date: February 14, 2025
- Official name: 26th Annual Fresh From Florida 250
- Location: Daytona International Speedway in Daytona Beach, Florida
- Course: Permanent racing facility
- Course length: 2.5 miles (4.0 km)
- Distance: 100 laps, 250 mi (402 km)
- Scheduled distance: 100 laps, 250 mi (402 km)
- Average speed: 116.174 mph (186.964 km/h)

Pole position
Driver	Ben Rhodes	ThorSport Racing
- Time: 50.995

Most laps led
Driver	Chandler Smith	Front Row Motorsports
- Laps: 34

Winner
No. 11	Corey Heim	Tricon Garage

Television in the United States
- Network: FS1
- Announcers: Jamie Little, Joey Logano, and Kevin Harvick

Radio in the United States
- Radio: MRN

The 2025 Fresh From Florida 250 was the 1st stock car race of the 2025 NASCAR Craftsman Truck Series, and the 26th iteration of the event. The race was held on Friday, February 14, 2025, at Daytona International Speedway in Daytona Beach, Florida, a 2.5 miles (4.0 km) superspeedway. The race took the scheduled 100 laps to complete.

In an action-packed race with a surprise twist, Corey Heim, driving for Tricon Garage, would survive the chaos on the final lap to earn his 12th career NASCAR Craftsman Truck Series win, and his first of the season. Parker Kligerman, who was originally declared as the winner, was later disqualified during post-race inspection due to a height violation, officially credited with a 36th and last place finish. To fill out the podium, Gio Ruggiero, driving for Tricon Garage, and Grant Enfinger, driving for CR7 Motorsports, would finish 2nd and 3rd, respectively.

== Report ==
=== Background ===
Daytona International Speedway, the track where the race was held.

Daytona International Speedway is one of three superspeedways to hold NASCAR races, the other two being Atlanta Motor Speedway and Talladega Superspeedway. The standard track at Daytona International Speedway is a four-turn superspeedway that is 2.5 miles (4.0 km) long. The track's turns are banked at 31 degrees, while the front stretch, the location of the finish line, is banked at 18 degrees.

==== Entry list ====
- (R) denotes rookie driver.
- (i) denotes driver who is ineligible for series driver points.

#	Driver	Team	Make
1	William Sawalich (i)	Tricon Garage	Toyota
02	Nathan Byrd	Young's Motorsports	Chevrolet
2	Josh Reaume	Reaume Brothers Racing	Ford
4	Mason Maggio (i)	Hettinger Racing	Chevrolet
5	Toni Breidinger (R)	Tricon Garage	Toyota
6	Norm Benning	Norm Benning Racing	Chevrolet
07	Michael McDowell (i)	Spire Motorsports	Chevrolet
7	Justin Haley (i)	Spire Motorsports	Chevrolet
9	Grant Enfinger	CR7 Motorsports	Chevrolet
11	Corey Heim	Tricon Garage	Toyota
13	Jake Garcia	ThorSport Racing	Ford
15	Tanner Gray	Tricon Garage	Toyota
17	Gio Ruggiero (R)	Tricon Garage	Toyota
18	Tyler Ankrum	McAnally-Hilgemann Racing	Chevrolet
19	Daniel Hemric	McAnally-Hilgemann Racing	Chevrolet
22	Jason White	Reaume Brothers Racing	Ford
26	Dawson Sutton (R)	Rackley W.A.R.	Chevrolet
28	Bryan Dauzat	FDNY Racing	Chevrolet
33	Frankie Muniz (R)	Reaume Brothers Racing	Ford
34	Layne Riggs	Front Row Motorsports	Ford
38	Chandler Smith	Front Row Motorsports	Ford
42	Matt Mills	Niece Motorsports	Chevrolet
44	Bayley Currey	Niece Motorsports	Chevrolet
45	Kaden Honeycutt	Niece Motorsports	Chevrolet
52	Stewart Friesen	Halmar Friesen Racing	Toyota
56	Timmy Hill	Hill Motorsports	Toyota
66	Johnny Sauter	ThorSport Racing	Ford
71	Rajah Caruth	Spire Motorsports	Chevrolet
75	Parker Kligerman	Henderson Motorsports	Chevrolet
76	Spencer Boyd	Freedom Racing Enterprises	Chevrolet
77	Andrés Pérez de Lara (R)	Spire Motorsports	Chevrolet
81	Connor Mosack (R)	McAnally-Hilgemann Racing	Chevrolet
88	Matt Crafton	ThorSport Racing	Ford
90	Justin Carroll	TC Motorsports	Chevrolet
91	Jack Wood	McAnally-Hilgemann Racing	Chevrolet
95	Clay Greenfield	GK Racing	Chevrolet
98	Ty Majeski	ThorSport Racing	Ford
99	Ben Rhodes	ThorSport Racing	Ford
Official entry list

== Qualifying ==
The first and only practice session was originally scheduled to be held on Thursday, February 13, at 5:05 PM EST, but was cancelled due to inclement weather.

Qualifying was held on Friday, February 14, at 3:00 PM EST. Since Daytona International Speedway is a superspeedway, the qualifying procedure used is a single-car, single-lap system with two rounds. In the first round, drivers have one lap to set a time and determine positions 11-36. The fastest ten drivers from the first round will advance to the second and final round, and whoever sets the fastest time in Round 2 will win the pole and determine the rest of the starting lineup.

Ben Rhodes, driving for ThorSport Racing, would win the pole after advancing from the preliminary round and setting the fastest time in Round 2, with a lap of 50.995, and a speed of 176.488 mph (284.030 km/h).

Two drivers failed to qualify: Justin Carroll and Bryan Dauzat.

=== Qualifying results ===
Pos.	#	Driver	Team	Make	Time (R1)	Speed (R1)	Time (R2)	Speed (R2)
1	99	Ben Rhodes	ThorSport Racing	Ford	51.069	176.232	50.995	176.488
2	98	Ty Majeski	ThorSport Racing	Ford	51.156	175.932	51.009	176.439
3	11	Corey Heim	Tricon Garage	Toyota	51.132	176.015	51.194	175.802
4	9	Grant Enfinger	CR7 Motorsports	Chevrolet	51.302	175.432	51.289	175.476
5	13	Jake Garcia	ThorSport Racing	Ford	51.357	175.244	51.343	175.292
6	38	Chandler Smith	Front Row Motorsports	Ford	51.261	175.572	51.356	175.247
7	26	Dawson Sutton (R)	Rackley W.A.R.	Chevrolet	51.435	174.978	51.423	175.019
8	45	Kaden Honeycutt	Niece Motorsports	Chevrolet	51.380	175.165	51.435	174.978
9	95	Clay Greenfield	GK Racing	Chevrolet	51.386	175.145	51.687	174.125
10	66	Johnny Sauter	ThorSport Racing	Ford	51.172	175.877	—	—
Eliminated in Round 1
11	88	Matt Crafton	ThorSport Racing	Ford	51.450	174.927	—	—
12	15	Tanner Gray	Tricon Garage	Toyota	51.457	174.903	—	—
13	71	Rajah Caruth	Spire Motorsports	Chevrolet	51.458	174.900	—	—
14	33	Frankie Muniz (R)	Reaume Brothers Racing	Ford	51.460	174.893	—	—
15	19	Daniel Hemric	McAnally-Hilgemann Racing	Chevrolet	51.473	174.849	—	—
16	76	Spencer Boyd	Freedom Racing Enterprises	Chevrolet	51.492	174.784	—	—
17	7	Justin Haley (i)	Spire Motorsports	Chevrolet	51.523	174.679	—	—
18	77	Andrés Pérez de Lara (R)	Spire Motorsports	Chevrolet	51.531	174.652	—	—
19	44	Bayley Currey	Niece Motorsports	Chevrolet	51.574	174.507	—	—
20	4	Mason Maggio (i)	Hettinger Racing	Chevrolet	51.584	174.473	—	—
21	91	Jack Wood	McAnally-Hilgemann Racing	Chevrolet	51.601	174.415	—	—
22	6	Norm Benning	Norm Benning Racing	Chevrolet	51.618	174.358	—	—
23	75	Parker Kligerman	Henderson Motorsports	Chevrolet	51.634	174.304	—	—
24	42	Matt Mills	Niece Motorsports	Chevrolet	51.642	174.277	—	—
25	02	Nathan Byrd	Young's Motorsports	Chevrolet	51.694	174.101	—	—
26	1	William Sawalich (i)	Tricon Garage	Toyota	51.701	174.078	—	—
27	34	Layne Riggs	Front Row Motorsports	Ford	51.703	174.071	—	—
28	5	Toni Breidinger (R)	Tricon Garage	Toyota	51.722	174.007	—	—
29	22	Jason White	Reaume Brothers Racing	Ford	51.826	173.658	—	—
30	81	Connor Mosack (R)	McAnally-Hilgemann Racing	Chevrolet	51.845	173.594	—	—
31	07	Michael McDowell (i)	Spire Motorsports	Chevrolet	51.853	173.568	—	—
Qualified by owner's points
32	2	Josh Reaume	Reaume Brothers Racing	Ford	51.857	173.554	—	—
33	56	Timmy Hill	Hill Motorsports	Toyota	52.187	172.457	—	—
34	17	Gio Ruggiero (R)	Tricon Garage	Toyota	53.778	167.355	—	—
35	52	Stewart Friesen	Halmar Friesen Racing	Toyota	—	—	—	—
36	18	Tyler Ankrum	McAnally-Hilgemann Racing	Chevrolet	—	—	—	—
Failed to qualify
37	90	Justin Carroll	TC Motorsports	Chevrolet	52.554	171.252	—	—
38	28	Bryan Dauzat	FDNY Racing	Chevrolet	—	—	—	—
Official qualifying results
Official starting lineup

== Race results ==
Stage 1 Laps: 20

Pos.	#	Driver	Team	Make	Pts
1	99	Ben Rhodes	ThorSport Racing	Ford	10
2	66	Johnny Sauter	ThorSport Racing	Ford	9
3	9	Grant Enfinger	CR7 Motorsports	Chevrolet	8
4	38	Chandler Smith	Front Row Motorsports	Ford	7
5	11	Corey Heim	Tricon Garage	Toyota	6
6	15	Tanner Gray	Tricon Garage	Toyota	5
7	98	Ty Majeski	ThorSport Racing	Ford	4
8	19	Daniel Hemric	McAnally-Hilgemann Racing	Chevrolet	3
9	77	Andrés Pérez de Lara (R)	Spire Motorsports	Chevrolet	2
10	17	Gio Ruggiero (R)	Tricon Garage	Toyota	1

Stage 2 Laps: 20

Pos.	#	Driver	Team	Make	Pts
1	88	Matt Crafton	ThorSport Racing	Ford	10
2	99	Ben Rhodes	ThorSport Racing	Ford	9
3	98	Ty Majeski	ThorSport Racing	Ford	8
4	38	Chandler Smith	Front Row Motorsports	Ford	7
5	91	Jack Wood	McAnally-Hilgemann Racing	Chevrolet	6
6	52	Stewart Friesen	Halmar Friesen Racing	Toyota	5
7	19	Daniel Hemric	McAnally-Hilgemann Racing	Chevrolet	4
8	11	Corey Heim	Tricon Garage	Toyota	3
9	75	Parker Kligerman	Henderson Motorsports	Chevrolet	2
10	71	Rajah Caruth	Spire Motorsports	Chevrolet	1

Stage 3 Laps: 60

Fin	St	#	Driver	Team	Make	Laps	Led	Status	Pts
1	3	11	Corey Heim	Tricon Garage	Toyota	100	2	Running	49
2	34	17	Gio Ruggiero (R)	Tricon Garage	Toyota	100	11	Running	36
3	2	98	Ty Majeski	ThorSport Racing	Ford	100	0	Running	46
4	4	9	Grant Enfinger	CR7 Motorsports	Chevrolet	100	7	Running	41
5	17	7	Justin Haley (i)	Spire Motorsports	Chevrolet	100	2	Running	0
6	6	38	Chandler Smith	Front Row Motorsports	Ford	100	34	Running	45
7	15	19	Daniel Hemric	McAnally-Hilgemann Racing	Chevrolet	100	7	Running	37
8	29	22	Jason White	Reaume Brothers Racing	Ford	100	0	Running	29
9	26	1	William Sawalich (i)	Tricon Garage	Toyota	100	0	Running	0
10	14	33	Frankie Muniz (R)	Reaume Brothers Racing	Ford	100	0	Running	27
11	33	56	Timmy Hill	Hill Motorsports	Toyota	100	0	Running	26
12	5	13	Jake Garcia	ThorSport Racing	Ford	100	0	Running	25
13	27	34	Layne Riggs	Front Row Motorsports	Ford	100	0	Running	25
14	18	77	Andrés Pérez de Lara (R)	Spire Motorsports	Chevrolet	100	0	Running	25
15	20	4	Mason Maggio (i)	Hettinger Racing	Chevrolet	100	0	Running	0
16	22	6	Norm Benning	Norm Benning Racing	Chevrolet	100	0	Running	21
17	10	66	Johnny Sauter	ThorSport Racing	Ford	100	0	Running	29
18	32	2	Josh Reaume	Reaume Brothers Racing	Ford	100	1	Running	19
19	16	76	Spencer Boyd	Freedom Racing Enterprises	Chevrolet	100	0	Running	18
20	1	99	Ben Rhodes	ThorSport Racing	Ford	100	22	Running	36
21	19	44	Bayley Currey	Niece Motorsports	Chevrolet	100	0	Running	16
22	12	15	Tanner Gray	Tricon Garage	Toyota	100	2	Running	20
23	35	52	Stewart Friesen	Halmar Friesen Racing	Toyota	99	0	Running	19
24	21	91	Jack Wood	McAnally-Hilgemann Racing	Chevrolet	99	0	Running	19
25	7	26	Dawson Sutton (R)	Rackley W.A.R.	Chevrolet	98	0	Running	12
26	31	07	Michael McDowell (i)	Spire Motorsports	Chevrolet	98	1	Running	0
27	11	88	Matt Crafton	ThorSport Racing	Ford	98	9	Running	20
28	28	5	Toni Breidinger (R)	Tricon Garage	Toyota	96	0	Running	9
29	24	42	Matt Mills	Niece Motorsports	Chevrolet	95	0	Running	8
30	13	71	Rajah Caruth	Spire Motorsports	Chevrolet	82	0	Accident	9
31	25	02	Nathan Byrd	Young's Motorsports	Chevrolet	82	0	Accident	6
32	30	81	Connor Mosack (R)	McAnally-Hilgemann Racing	Chevrolet	79	0	Running	5
33	9	95	Clay Greenfield	GK Racing	Chevrolet	68	0	Accident	4
34	36	18	Tyler Ankrum	McAnally-Hilgemann Racing	Chevrolet	48	0	Engine	3
35	8	45	Kaden Honeycutt	Niece Motorsports	Chevrolet	3	0	Accident	2
DSQ	23	75	Parker Kligerman	Henderson Motorsports	Chevrolet	100	2	Height violation	1
Official race results

== Standings after the race ==
Drivers' Championship standings

Pos	Driver	Points
1	Corey Heim	49
2	Ty Majeski	46 (-3)
3	Chandler Smith	45 (–4)
4	Grant Enfinger	41 (–8)
5	Daniel Hemric	37 (–12)
6	Gio Ruggiero	36 (–13)
7	Ben Rhodes	36 (–13)
8	Jason White	29 (–20)
9	Johnny Sauter	29 (–20)
10	Frankie Muniz	27 (–22)
Official driver's standings

Manufacturers' Championship standings

Pos	Manufacturer	Points
1	Toyota	40
2	Ford	34 (-6)
3	Chevrolet	33 (–7)

- Note: Only the first 10 positions are included for the driver standings.

Previous race: 2024 NASCAR Craftsman Truck Series Championship Race	NASCAR Craftsman Truck Series; 2025 season	Next race: 2025 Fr8 208
