= 2025 Love's RV Stop 225 =

23rd race of the 2025 NASCAR Craftsman Truck Series

Race details
- Race 23 of 25 of the 2025 NASCAR Craftsman Truck Series
- Date: October 17, 2025
- Official name: 20th Annual Love's RV Stop 225
- Location: Talladega Superspeedway in Lincoln, Alabama
- Course: Permanent racing facility
- Course length: 2.66 miles (4.28 km)
- Distance: 90 laps, 239.4 mi (385.2 km)
- Scheduled distance: 85 laps, 226.1 mi (363.9 km)
- Average speed: 119.253 mph (191.919 km/h)

Pole position
Driver	Gio Ruggiero	Tricon Garage
- Time: 54.292

Most laps led
Driver	Gio Ruggiero	Tricon Garage
- Laps: 37

Winner
No. 17	Gio Ruggiero	Tricon Garage

Television in the United States
- Network: FOX
- Announcers: Jamie Little, Brad Keselowski, and Michael Waltrip

Radio in the United States
- Radio: NRN

The 2025 Love's RV Stop 225 was the 23rd stock car race of the 2025 NASCAR Craftsman Truck Series, the second race of the Round of 8, and the 20th iteration of the event. The race was held on Friday, October 17, 2025, at Talladega Superspeedway in Lincoln, Alabama, a 2.66 miles (4.28 km) asphalt superspeedway. The race was contested over 90 laps, extended from 85 laps due to a green-white-checkered finish.

Gio Ruggiero, driving for Tricon Garage, would survive a late overtime restart, and held off the field to score his first career NASCAR Craftsman Truck Series win. Ruggiero dominated the majority of the race as well by winning the second stage and leading a race-high 37 laps from the pole position. To fill out the podium, Corey Heim, driving for Tricon Garage, and Ty Majeski, driving for ThorSport Racing, would finish 2nd and 3rd, respectively.

== Report ==
=== Background ===
Talladega Superspeedway, the track where the race will be held.

Talladega Superspeedway, formerly known as Alabama International Motor Speedway, is a motorsports complex located north of Talladega, Alabama. It is located on the former Anniston Air Force Base in the small city of Lincoln. A tri-oval, the track was constructed in 1969 by the International Speedway Corporation, a business controlled by the France family. Talladega is most known for its steep banking. The track currently hosts NASCAR's Cup Series, Xfinity Series, and Craftsman Truck Series. Talladega is the longest NASCAR oval with a length of 2.66-mile-long (4.28 km) tri-oval like the Daytona International Speedway, which is 2.5-mile-long (4.0 km).

=== Entry list ===
- (R) denotes rookie driver.
- (i) denotes driver who is ineligible for series driver points.
- (P) denotes playoff driver.

#	Driver	Team	Make
1	Bret Holmes	Tricon Garage	Toyota
02	Nathan Byrd	Young's Motorsports	Chevrolet
2	Josh Reaume	Reaume Brothers Racing	Ford
5	Toni Breidinger (R)	Tricon Garage	Toyota
6	Norm Benning	Norm Benning Racing	Chevrolet
7	J. J. Yeley (i)	Spire Motorsports	Chevrolet
9	Grant Enfinger (P)	CR7 Motorsports	Chevrolet
11	Corey Heim (P)	Tricon Garage	Toyota
13	Jake Garcia	ThorSport Racing	Ford
15	Tanner Gray	Tricon Garage	Toyota
16	Kris Wright (i)	McAnally–Hilgemann Racing	Chevrolet
17	Gio Ruggiero (R)	Tricon Garage	Toyota
18	Tyler Ankrum (P)	McAnally–Hilgemann Racing	Chevrolet
19	Daniel Hemric (P)	McAnally–Hilgemann Racing	Chevrolet
22	Jason White	Reaume Brothers Racing	Ford
26	Dawson Sutton (R)	Rackley W.A.R.	Chevrolet
33	Frankie Muniz (R)	Reaume Brothers Racing	Ford
34	Layne Riggs (P)	Front Row Motorsports	Ford
35	Greg Van Alst	Greg Van Alst Motorsports	Toyota
38	Chandler Smith	Front Row Motorsports	Ford
42	Matt Mills	Niece Motorsports	Chevrolet
44	Andrés Pérez de Lara (R)	Niece Motorsports	Chevrolet
45	Bayley Currey	Niece Motorsports	Chevrolet
52	Kaden Honeycutt (P)	Halmar Friesen Racing	Toyota
66	Luke Fenhaus (R)	ThorSport Racing	Ford
69	Tyler Tomassi (i)	MBM Motorsports	Ford
71	Rajah Caruth (P)	Spire Motorsports	Chevrolet
74	Caleb Costner	Mike Harmon Racing	Toyota
75	Parker Kligerman	Henderson Motorsports	Chevrolet
76	Spencer Boyd	Freedom Racing Enterprises	Chevrolet
77	Corey LaJoie	Spire Motorsports	Chevrolet
81	Connor Mosack (R)	McAnally–Hilgemann Racing	Chevrolet
88	Matt Crafton	ThorSport Racing	Ford
91	Jack Wood	McAnally–Hilgemann Racing	Chevrolet
98	Ty Majeski (P)	ThorSport Racing	Ford
99	Ben Rhodes	ThorSport Racing	Ford
Official entry list

== Qualifying ==
Qualifying was held on Friday, October 17, at 11:30 AM CST. Since Talladega Superspeedway is a superspeedway, the qualifying procedure used is a single-car, one-lap system with two rounds. In the first round, drivers have one lap to set a time and determine positions 11-36. The fastest ten drivers from the first round will advance to the second and final round, and whoever sets the fastest time in Round 2 will win the pole and determine the rest of the starting lineup.

Gio Ruggiero, driving for Tricon Garage, would win the pole after advancing from the preliminary round and setting the fastest time in Round 2, with a lap of 54.292, and a speed of 176.380 mph (283.856 km/h).

No drivers would fail to qualify.

=== Qualifying results ===
Pos.	#	Driver	Team	Make	Time (R1)	Speed (R1)	Time (R2)	Speed (R2)
1	17	Gio Ruggiero (R)	Tricon Garage	Toyota	54.357	176.169	54.292	176.380
2	98	Ty Majeski (P)	ThorSport Racing	Ford	54.267	176.461	54.293	176.376
3	11	Corey Heim (P)	Tricon Garage	Toyota	54.204	176.666	54.308	176.328
4	88	Matt Crafton	ThorSport Racing	Ford	54.371	176.123	54.353	176.182
5	52	Kaden Honeycutt (P)	Halmar Friesen Racing	Toyota	54.499	175.710	54.412	175.991
6	66	Luke Fenhaus (R)	ThorSport Racing	Ford	54.584	175.436	54.444	175.887
7	99	Ben Rhodes	ThorSport Racing	Ford	54.500	175.706	54.455	175.852
8	18	Tyler Ankrum (P)	McAnally–Hilgemann Racing	Chevrolet	54.695	175.080	54.486	175.752
9	1	Bret Holmes	Tricon Garage	Toyota	54.672	175.154	54.536	175.590
10	15	Tanner Gray	Tricon Garage	Toyota	54.556	175.526	54.638	175.263
Eliminated in Round 1
11	71	Rajah Caruth (P)	Spire Motorsports	Chevrolet	54.709	175.035	—	—
12	26	Dawson Sutton (R)	Rackley W.A.R.	Chevrolet	54.715	175.016	—	—
13	16	Kris Wright (i)	McAnally–Hilgemann Racing	Chevrolet	54.757	174.882	—	—
14	81	Connor Mosack (R)	McAnally–Hilgemann Racing	Chevrolet	54.776	174.821	—	—
15	9	Grant Enfinger (P)	CR7 Motorsports	Chevrolet	54.785	174.792	—	—
16	7	J. J. Yeley (i)	Spire Motorsports	Chevrolet	54.787	174.786	—	—
17	19	Daniel Hemric (P)	McAnally–Hilgemann Racing	Chevrolet	54.849	174.588	—	—
18	77	Corey LaJoie	Spire Motorsports	Chevrolet	54.897	174.436	—	—
19	76	Spencer Boyd	Freedom Racing Enterprises	Chevrolet	54.932	174.325	—	—
20	45	Bayley Currey	Niece Motorsports	Chevrolet	55.045	173.967	—	—
21	75	Parker Kligerman	Henderson Motorsports	Chevrolet	55.086	173.837	—	—
22	44	Andrés Pérez de Lara (R)	Niece Motorsports	Chevrolet	55.096	173.806	—	—
23	42	Matt Mills	Niece Motorsports	Chevrolet	55.111	173.758	—	—
24	91	Jack Wood	McAnally–Hilgemann Racing	Chevrolet	55.117	173.739	—	—
25	38	Chandler Smith	Front Row Motorsports	Ford	55.120	173.730	—	—
26	13	Jake Garcia	ThorSport Racing	Ford	55.214	173.434	—	—
27	69	Tyler Tomassi (i)	MBM Motorsports	Ford	55.223	173.406	—	—
28	33	Frankie Muniz (R)	Reaume Brothers Racing	Ford	55.253	173.312	—	—
29	2	Josh Reaume	Reaume Brothers Racing	Ford	55.275	173.243	—	—
30	5	Toni Breidinger (R)	Tricon Garage	Toyota	55.363	172.968	—	—
31	02	Nathan Byrd	Young's Motorsports	Chevrolet	55.387	172.893	—	—
Qualified by owner's points
32	6	Norm Benning	Norm Benning Racing	Chevrolet	55.457	172.674	—	—
33	22	Jason White	Reaume Brothers Racing	Ford	55.935	171.199	—	—
34	35	Greg Van Alst	Greg Van Alst Motorsports	Toyota	56.218	170.337	—	—
35	34	Layne Riggs (P)	Front Row Motorsports	Ford	—	—	—	—
36	74	Caleb Costner	Mike Harmon Racing	Toyota	—	—	—	—
Official qualifying results
Official starting lineup

== Race results ==
Stage 1 Laps: 20

Pos.	#	Driver	Team	Make	Pts
1	71	Rajah Caruth (P)	Spire Motorsports	Chevrolet	10
2	77	Corey LaJoie	Spire Motorsports	Chevrolet	9
3	11	Corey Heim (P)	Tricon Garage	Toyota	8
4	7	J. J. Yeley (i)	Spire Motorsports	Chevrolet	0
5	99	Ben Rhodes	ThorSport Racing	Ford	6
6	52	Kaden Honeycutt (P)	Halmar Friesen Racing	Toyota	5
7	18	Tyler Ankrum (P)	McAnally-Hilgemann Racing	Chevrolet	4
8	26	Dawson Sutton (R)	Rackley W.A.R.	Chevrolet	3
9	17	Gio Ruggiero (R)	Tricon Garage	Toyota	2
10	19	Daniel Hemric (P)	McAnally-Hilgemann Racing	Chevrolet	1

Stage 2 Laps: 20

Pos.	#	Driver	Team	Make	Pts
1	17	Gio Ruggiero (R)	Tricon Garage	Toyota	10
2	52	Kaden Honeycutt (P)	Halmar Friesen Racing	Toyota	9
3	71	Rajah Caruth (P)	Spire Motorsports	Chevrolet	8
4	7	J. J. Yeley (i)	Spire Motorsports	Chevrolet	0
5	66	Luke Fenhaus (R)	ThorSport Racing	Ford	6
6	77	Corey LaJoie	Spire Motorsports	Chevrolet	5
7	18	Tyler Ankrum (P)	McAnally-Hilgemann Racing	Chevrolet	4
8	81	Connor Mosack (R)	McAnally-Hilgemann Racing	Chevrolet	3
9	11	Corey Heim (P)	Tricon Garage	Toyota	2
10	88	Matt Crafton	ThorSport Racing	Ford	1

Stage 3 Laps: 50

Fin	St	#	Driver	Team	Make	Laps	Led	Status	Pts
1	1	17	Gio Ruggiero (R)	Tricon Garage	Toyota	90	37	Running	52
2	3	11	Corey Heim (P)	Tricon Garage	Toyota	90	6	Running	45
3	2	98	Ty Majeski (P)	ThorSport Racing	Ford	90	0	Running	34
4	12	26	Dawson Sutton (R)	Rackley W.A.R.	Chevrolet	90	0	Running	36
5	35	34	Layne Riggs (P)	Front Row Motorsports	Ford	90	0	Running	32
6	8	18	Tyler Ankrum (P)	McAnally–Hilgemann Racing	Chevrolet	90	0	Running	39
7	4	88	Matt Crafton	ThorSport Racing	Ford	90	0	Running	31
8	18	77	Corey LaJoie	Spire Motorsports	Chevrolet	90	0	Running	43
9	11	71	Rajah Caruth (P)	Spire Motorsports	Chevrolet	90	6	Running	46
10	5	52	Kaden Honeycutt (P)	Halmar Friesen Racing	Toyota	90	0	Running	41
11	13	16	Kris Wright (i)	McAnally–Hilgemann Racing	Chevrolet	90	0	Running	0
12	10	15	Tanner Gray	Tricon Garage	Toyota	90	11	Running	25
13	16	7	J. J. Yeley (i)	Spire Motorsports	Chevrolet	90	3	Running	0
14	14	81	Connor Mosack (R)	McAnally–Hilgemann Racing	Chevrolet	90	0	Running	26
15	19	76	Spencer Boyd	Freedom Racing Enterprises	Chevrolet	90	0	Running	22
16	7	99	Ben Rhodes	ThorSport Racing	Ford	90	13	Running	28
17	22	44	Andrés Pérez de Lara (R)	Niece Motorsports	Chevrolet	90	0	Running	20
18	31	02	Nathan Byrd	Young's Motorsports	Chevrolet	90	6	Running	19
19	23	42	Matt Mills	Niece Motorsports	Chevrolet	90	0	Running	18
20	28	33	Frankie Muniz (R)	Reaume Brothers Racing	Ford	90	0	Running	17
21	24	91	Jack Wood	McAnally–Hilgemann Racing	Chevrolet	90	1	Running	16
22	25	38	Chandler Smith	Front Row Motorsports	Ford	90	1	Running	15
23	6	66	Luke Fenhaus (R)	ThorSport Racing	Ford	90	5	Running	20
24	29	2	Josh Reaume	Reaume Brothers Racing	Ford	89	0	Running	13
25	34	35	Greg Van Alst	Greg Van Alst Motorsports	Toyota	88	0	Running	12
26	21	75	Parker Kligerman	Henderson Motorsports	Chevrolet	87	1	Running	11
27	27	69	Tyler Tomassi (i)	MBM Motorsports	Ford	87	0	Running	0
28	9	1	Bret Holmes	Tricon Garage	Toyota	87	0	Running	9
29	26	13	Jake Garcia	ThorSport Racing	Ford	87	0	Running	8
30	33	22	Jason White	Reaume Brothers Racing	Ford	83	0	Electrical	7
31	20	45	Bayley Currey	Niece Motorsports	Chevrolet	68	0	Driveshaft	6
32	32	6	Norm Benning	Norm Benning Racing	Chevrolet	55	0	Engine	5
33	30	5	Toni Breidinger (R)	Tricon Garage	Toyota	54	0	Suspension	4
34	17	19	Daniel Hemric (P)	McAnally–Hilgemann Racing	Chevrolet	52	0	Accident	4
35	36	74	Caleb Costner	Mike Harmon Racing	Toyota	43	0	Electrical	2
36	15	9	Grant Enfinger (P)	CR7 Motorsports	Chevrolet	3	0	Accident	1
Official race results

== Standings after the race ==
Drivers' Championship standings

	Pos	Driver	Points
	1	Corey Heim	3,167
2	2	Rajah Caruth	3,096 (–71)
1	3	Tyler Ankrum	3,090 (–77)
4	4	Kaden Honeycutt	3,087 (–80)
1	5	Ty Majeski	3,082 (–85)
1	6	Layne Riggs	3,081 (–86)
4	7	Daniel Hemric	3,055 (–112)
1	8	Grant Enfinger	3,047 (–120)
	9	Chandler Smith	2,119 (–1,048)
	10	Jake Garcia	2,093 (–1,074)
Official driver's standings

Manufacturers' Championship standings

Pos	Manufacturer	Points
1	Toyota	845
2	Chevrolet	813 (–32)
3	Ford	796 (–49)

- Note: Only the first 10 positions are included for the driver standings.

Previous race: 2025 Ecosave 250	NASCAR Craftsman Truck Series; 2025 season	Next race: 2025 Slim Jim 200
