= Rajah Caruth =

American racing driver (born 2002)

- Caruth at Las Vegas Motor Speedway in 2026
- Born: Rajah Kirby Caruth; June 11, 2002 (age 24); Atlanta, Georgia, U.S.
- Height: 5 ft 7 in (1.70 m)
- Weight: 150 lb (68 kg)
- Achievements: First Caribbean-American driver to win at Tri-County Motor Speedway
- Awards: 2021 Wendell Scott Trailblazer Award Winner; 2024–2025 NASCAR Craftsman Truck Series Most Popular Driver

NASCAR O'Reilly Auto Parts Series career
- 55 races run over 4 years
- Car no., team: No. 88 (JR Motorsports)
- 2026 position: 12th
- Best finish: 12th (2026)
- First race: 2022 ToyotaCare 250 (Richmond)
- Last race: 2026 O'Reilly Auto Parts 300 (Homestead)
| Wins | Top tens | Poles |
|---|---|---|
| 0 | 9 | 1 |

NASCAR FedEx Freight Truck Series career
- 77 races run over 5 years
- 2026 position: 99th
- Best finish: 6th (2025)
- First race: 2022 Toyota 200 (Gateway)
- Last race: 2026 Ecosave 200 (Charlotte)
- First win: 2024 Victoria's Voice Foundation 200 (Las Vegas)
- Last win: 2025 Rackley Roofing 200 (Nashville)
| Wins | Top tens | Poles |
|---|---|---|
| 2 | 30 | 2 |

ARCA Menards Series career
- 25 races run over 2 years
- Best finish: 3rd (2022)
- First race: 2021 Shore Lunch 150 (Iowa)
- Last race: 2022 Shore Lunch 200 (Toledo)
| Wins | Top tens | Poles |
|---|---|---|
| 0 | 18 | 0 |

ARCA Menards Series East career
- 12 races run over 2 years
- Best finish: 3rd (2021)
- First race: 2021 Jeep Beach 175 (New Smyrna)
- Last race: 2022 Bush's Beans 200 (Bristol)
| Wins | Top tens | Poles |
|---|---|---|
| 0 | 8 | 0 |

ARCA Menards Series West career
- 2 races run over 2 years
- Best finish: 47th (2021)
- First race: 2021 Arizona Lottery 100 (Phoenix)
- Last race: 2022 General Tire 150 (Phoenix)
| Wins | Top tens | Poles |
|---|---|---|
| 0 | 2 | 0 |
- Statistics up to date as of November 7, 2026.

Rajah Kirby Caruth (born June 11, 2002) is an American professional stock car racing driver. He competes full-time in the NASCAR O'Reilly Auto Parts Series, driving the No. 88 Chevrolet Camaro SS for JR Motorsports.

== Racing career ==
=== Early career ===
Caruth first got his love for racing after watching Disney Pixar's Cars as a kid. When he was twelve, his parents surprised him with a trip to the 2014 Federated Auto Parts 400 in September. In 2018, while juggling from school, basketball, track, and a summer job, Caruth and his family fundraised an iRacing sim, and once he turned sixteen on June 11, he began racing virtually in the eNASCAR Ignite Series. Rajah was able to catch the attention of the NASCAR Drive for Diversity Program, which resulted in him having a shot to race in a legends car at Charlotte Motor Speedway in 2019 for the Bojangles' Southern Shootout. Rajah ended his rookie season getting two top-tens, and ending up thirteenth in the Semi-pro points.

=== Late models ===
In 2020, Caruth moved up to the NASCAR Advance Auto Parts Weekly Series, where he won his first career late model race at Greenville-Pickens Speedway and ended the rest of the season with three top-fives and nine top-tens in a total of nineteen late model starts. In 2021, Caruth returned to the NASCAR Advance Auto Parts Weekly Series, and got his second and third late model win after winning both Hickory Motor Speedway late model features. On May 1, 2021, Caruth won at the Tri-County Motor Speedway, becoming the first African-American driver to win at Tri-County, and earning his fourth overall late model win.

=== ARCA ===
On February 3, 2021, Caruth announced that he would run full-time in the ARCA Menards Series East for Rev Racing, and would compete for Rookie of the Year honors. Caruth finished the season with two top-fives, three top-tens, and three top-fifteens, ending up third in the standings. He made a one-off start in the 2022 General Tire 125, starting fifth and finishing fourth. He ran three more races that season, which were all combination races with the main series.

On July 23, 2021, Rev Racing announced on Twitter that Caruth and teammate Nick Sanchez would drive in the 2021 Shore Lunch 150 at Iowa Speedway, which was Caruth's first ARCA Menards Series start. Caruth started twelfth and finished ninth.

Caruth made his ARCA Menards Series West start in the 2021 Arizona Lottery 100, where he started and finished the race in eighth. He made his second start in the 2022 General Tire 150, driving in the paired event with the main series. He started seventh and finished fourth.

On August 30, 2021, Caruth announced that he would drive full-time in the 2022 ARCA Menards Series season with Rev Racing. He earned his best career finish at the 2022 Dutch Boy 150, finishing second. After earning eight top-fives and fourteen top-tens throughout the season, he finished third in the final standings.

=== NASCAR Craftsman Truck Series ===
==== 2022 ====
On May 31, 2022, it was announced that Caruth would make his NASCAR Camping World Truck Series debut at the World Wide Technology Raceway for Spire Motorsports. In his first start, Caruth initially finished in tenth, after the caution came out on the final lap. He was later scored in the eleventh spot. At Richmond, Caruth started 28th and finished 25th, four laps down. At Bristol, Caruth was involved in an accident with Josh Reaume on lap 34, eventually retiring from the race ten laps later.

==== 2023 ====
On December 1, 2022, TobyChristie.com reported that Caruth would drive full-time in the Truck Series in 2023, driving the No. 24 truck for GMS Racing. It was also reported that The Wendell Scott Foundation will sponsor Caruth for part of his 2023 season. On December 6, it was officially confirmed that Caruth would drive for GMS Racing in 2023. After a rough start to the season with three DNF's, Caruth earned his best career finish of sixth at Darlington Raceway in May. Caruth continued to struggle throughout the regular season, and failed to make to playoffs. During the playoffs, Caruth improved his performance, earning three top-ten finishes with a worst finish of fourteenth. He finished the season sixteenth in points and fourth in Rookie of the Year standings.

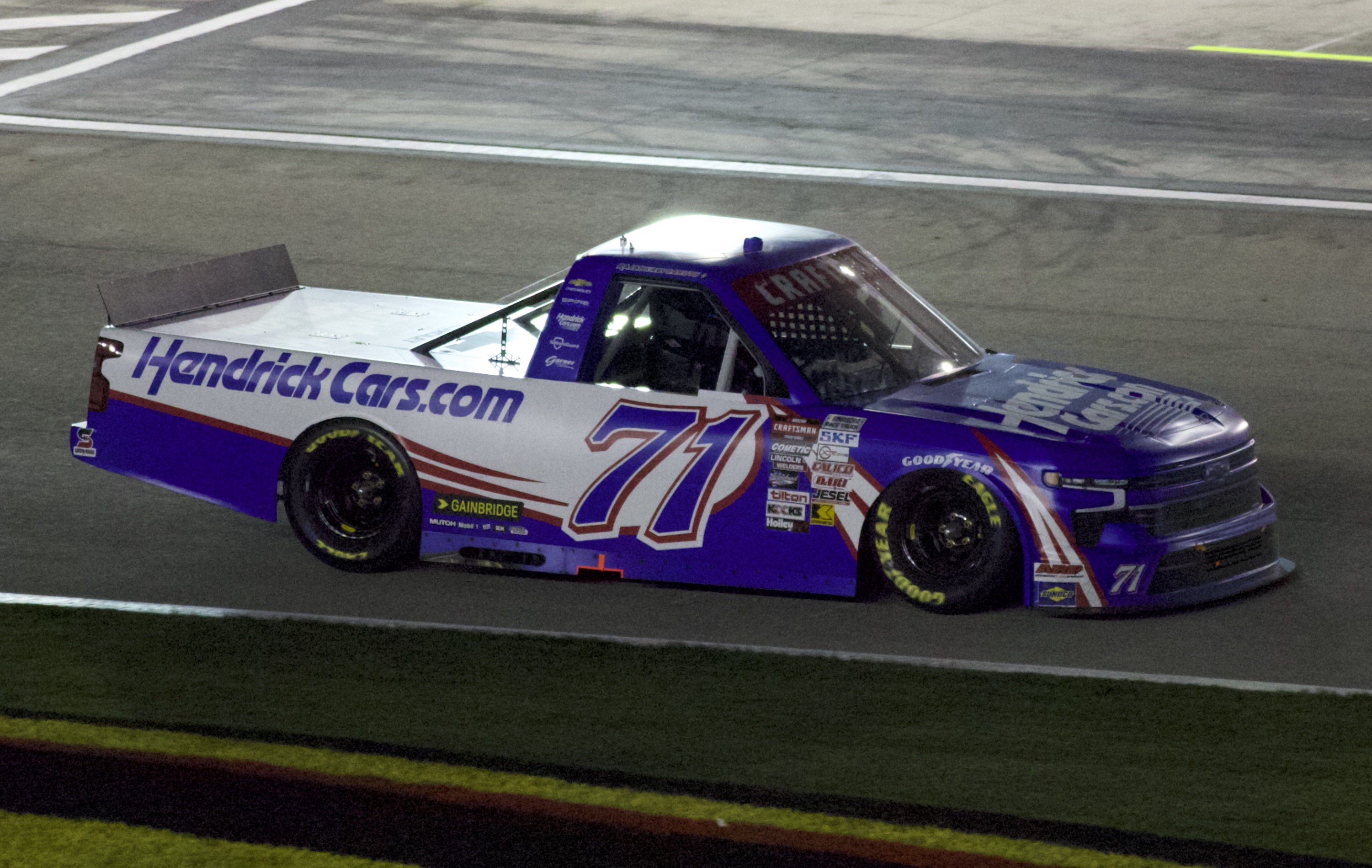
Caruth's race winning truck at Las Vegas Motor Speedway in 2024.

==== 2024 ====
On February 7, 2024, it was announced that Caruth would drive for Spire Motorsports full-time in the 2024 season, driving the No. 71 truck. On the final lap of the season-opener at Daytona, Caruth drifted up the racetrack at the exit of turn two, spinning out Jack Wood and collecting numerous trucks. Despite this, Caruth managed to earn a career-best finish of third. The following week, he earned an eighth place finish at Atlanta. On February 28, it was announced that HendrickCars.com would sponsor Caruth for all 23 races of the season, after previously announcing they would sponsor for ten races. At Las Vegas, Caruth scored his first career win, becoming only the third African-American driver to win in one of NASCAR's three national series, joining Wendell Scott and Bubba Wallace. Caruth would advance into the playoffs, but he would be eliminated in the Round of 8 and finish seventh in the point standings. On November 22, 2024, Caruth was named Most Popular Driver of the NASCAR Craftsman Truck Series.

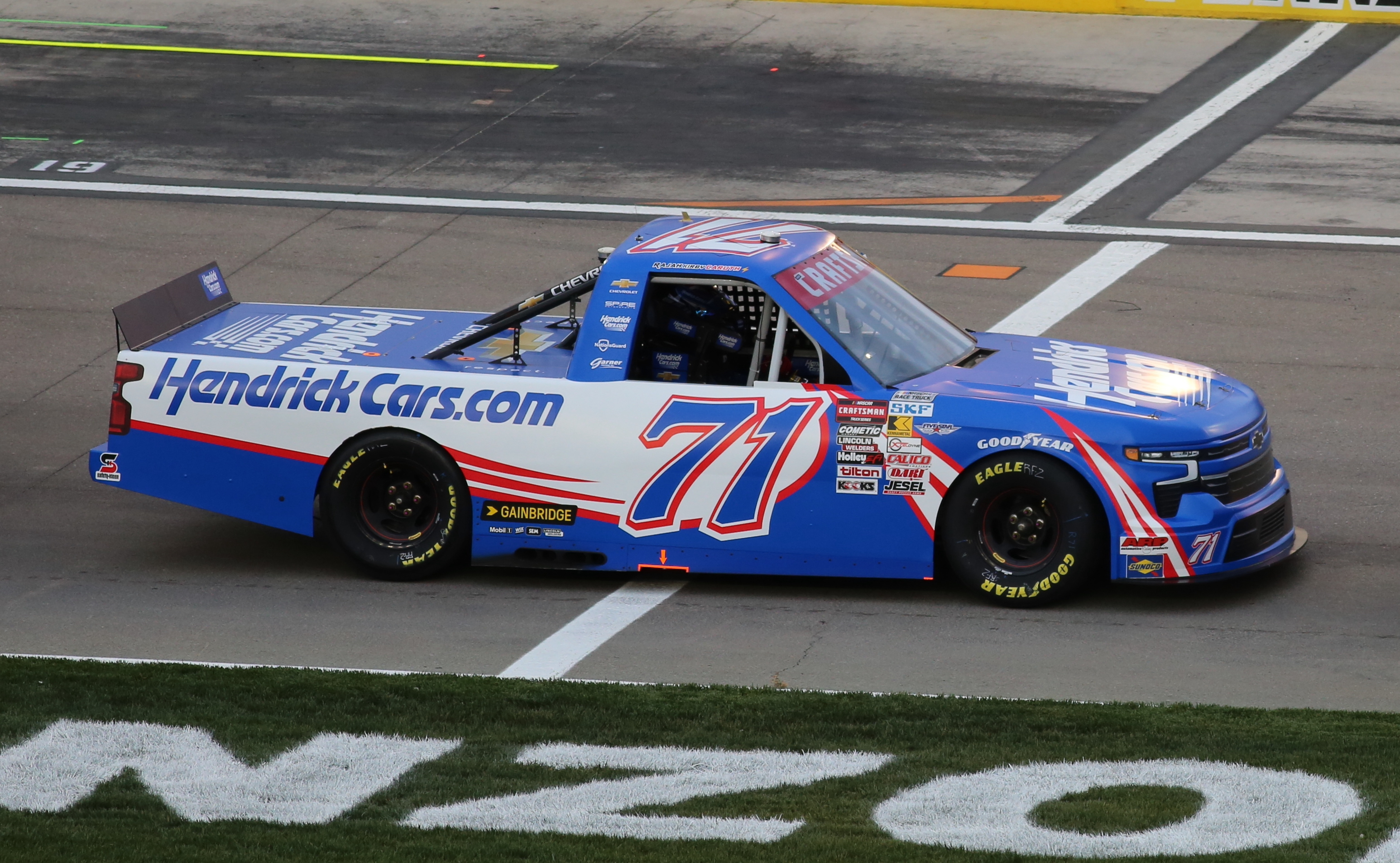
Caruth's truck at Las Vegas Motor Speedway in 2025.

==== 2025 ====
On December 13, 2024, it was announced that Caruth would return to the team in 2025. Caruth began the 2025 season with a 30th place DNF at Daytona. He would earn his first win of the season at Nashville. He advanced into the playoffs for a second year and was eliminated at the conclusion of the Round of 8 at Martinsville.

==== 2026 ====
Caruth made two starts in the Craftsman Truck Series, both for Spire Motorsports in their Nos. 7/77. His first start of the year came at Nashville, where he finished second to Layne Riggs. He also competed at Charlotte, where he scored a 31st place DNF.

=== O'Reilly Auto Parts Series ===
==== 2022 ====
On August 30, 2021, along with the ARCA announcement, Tommy Joe Martins and Caesar Bacarella announced the formation of Alpha Prime Racing, which would compete in the 2022 NASCAR Xfinity Series season, with Caruth set as one of the drivers for the team. On April 2, 2022, Caruth made his Xfinity Series debut at Richmond Raceway in the 44. He started 22nd and finish 24th. He made his second start in the 2022 A-GAME 200, where he qualified an impressive fifteenth. Suspension issues ended Caruth's race on lap 58, and he finished in last place. At the Pocono race, Caruth was involved in a vicious wreck with Alex Labbé on the first lap, resulting in another last-place finish. At Kansas, Caruth switched to the No. 45 car, sponsored by iRacing. He finished 25th after the race ended after stage 2 due to inclement weather. He earned his first top-twenty finish at Las Vegas, after finishing twentieth in the race. At Martinsville, Caruth dodged numerous wrecks and finished twelfth, earning his best career finish in the Xfinity Series. After the race, he had an altercation with Jeb Burton.

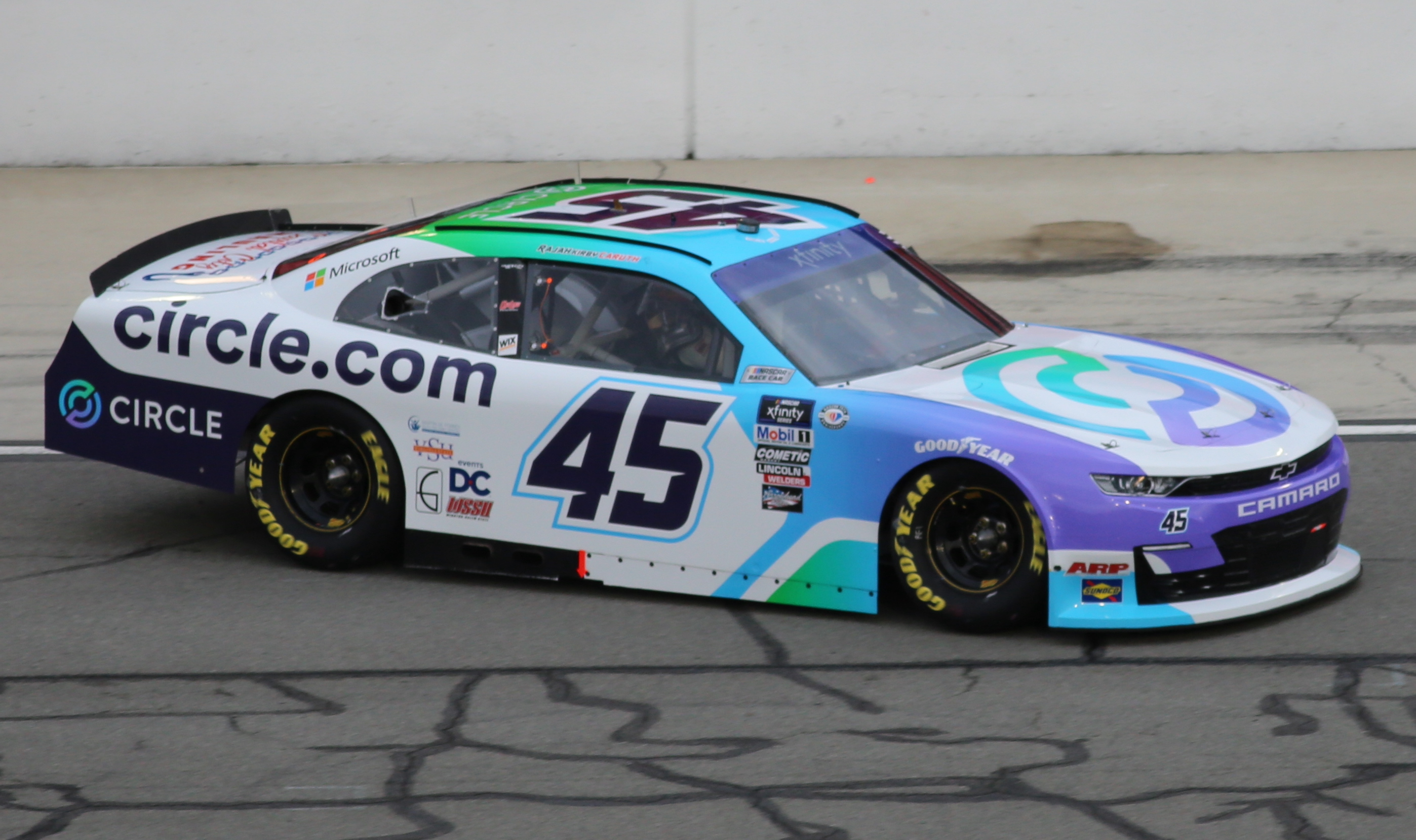
Caruth at Auto Club Speedway in 2023

==== 2023 ====
On January 27, 2023, Caruth announced that he would return to Alpha Prime Racing for the 2023 season, running another partial schedule. He earned his best finish of twelfth at Martinsville, surviving a crash-filled race. On September 26, it was announced that Caruth would drive the No. 17 Chevrolet for Hendrick Motorsports in the season finale at Phoenix Raceway. Caruth consistently ran near the top-ten throughout the race, and was in contention of earning his first top ten, until he got put into the wall by John Hunter Nemechek on the final lap, ultimately finishing fourteenth.

==== 2025 ====
On July 14, 2025, Jordan Anderson Racing announced that Caruth would compete for the team at Dover in their No. 32 car. He finished 22nd in the race after starting sixteenth. He returned to the team for Daytona, finishing 29th after starting fifteenth. On September 18, it was announced that Caruth would return to Hendrick Motorsports in their No. 17 car for the race at Kansas, where he finished eighteenth.

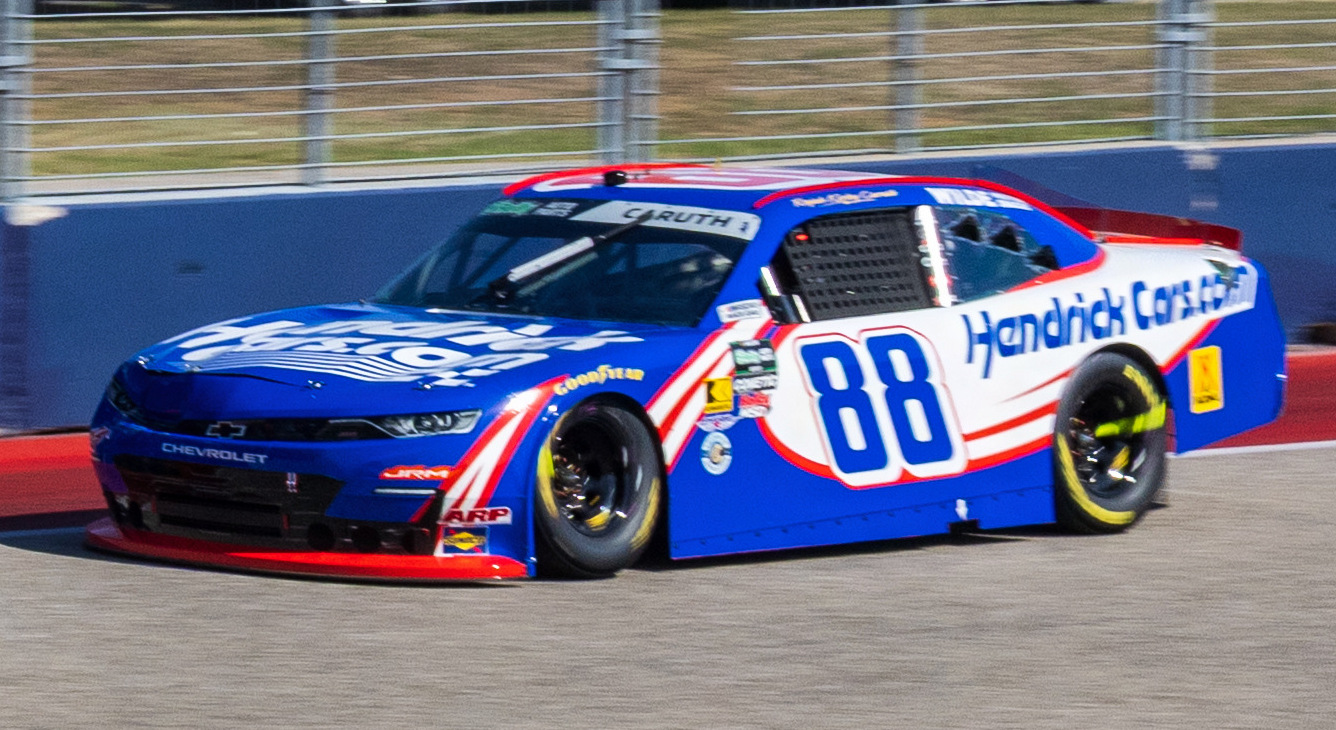
Caruth at Circuit of the Americas in 2026

==== 2026 ====
On October 21, 2025, it was announced that Caruth will run part-time for JR Motorsports in the 2026 season, driving their No. 88 car. During a Twitch livestream on October 22, Caruth announced he will return to Jordan Anderson Racing as their main driver in the No. 32 car and will run the full season between both teams. In January 2026, it was confirmed that Caruth will compete full-time in the O'Reilly Series on a split schedule between the JRM No. 88 and the JAR No. 32 Chevrolets.

==== 2027 ====
On November 3, 2026, it was announced that Caruth will drive full-time in the No. 88 full-time for JR Motorsports.

== Personal life ==
Caruth was born in Atlanta, Georgia to a Vincentian father and a Vincentian-Barbadian mother, but was raised in Brooklyn, New York, and Washington, D.C.

In June 2020, Caruth was the subject of a NASCAR documentary, "Through the Fences," which aired on Tempo Networks. It talks about Caruth's racing career and how he was accepted into the NASCAR Drive for Diversity program. He was also featured in an episode of "The Family Business" on BET+ in July.

Caruth graduated from the School Without Walls High School in 2020. School Without Walls High School is a magnet school known for its humanities programs.

On December 27, 2022, it was announced that Caruth would join Richard Petty on NASCAR's float in the 2023 Rose Parade. He is good friends with fellow driver Bubba Wallace, who serves as his mentor during the races.

In 2023, Caruth was the subject of another documentary, Outside Line, which premiered on November 9th during the Doc NYC Festival. Caruth is currently in a relationship with actress and producer, Marsai Martin.

In 2024, Caruth graduated from Winston-Salem State University with a Bachelor of Science in Motorsports Management.

== Motorsports career results ==
=== Stock car career summary ===
| Season | Series | Team | Races | Wins | Top 5 | Top 10 | Points | Position |
|---|---|---|---|---|---|---|---|---|
| 2021 | ARCA Menards Series | Rev Racing | 5 | 0 | 1 | 4 | 180 | 23rd |
| 2021 | ARCA Menards Series East | Rev Racing | 8 | 0 | 2 | 5 | 386 | **3rd** |
| 2021 | ARCA Menards Series West | Rev Racing | 1 | 0 | 0 | 1 | 36 | 47th |
| 2022 | ARCA Menards Series | Rev Racing | 20 | 0 | 8 | 14 | 932 | **3rd** |
| 2022 | ARCA Menards Series East | Rev Racing | 4 | 0 | 3 | 3 | 202 | 8th |
| 2022 | ARCA Menards Series West | Rev Racing | 1 | 0 | 1 | 1 | 40 | 49th |
| 2022 | NASCAR Xfinity Series | Alpha Prime Racing | 7 | 0 | 0 | 0 | 0 | NC† |
| 2022 | NASCAR Truck Series | Spire Motorsports | 4 | 0 | 0 | 0 | 46 | 43rd |
| 2023 | NASCAR Xfinity Series | Alpha Prime Racing; Hendrick Motorsports | 12 | 0 | 0 | 0 | 0 | NC† |
| 2023 | NASCAR Truck Series | GMS Racing | 23 | 0 | 0 | 4 | 482 | 16th |
| 2024 | NASCAR Truck Series | Spire Motorsports | 23 | 1 | 5 | 12 | 2213 | 7th |
| 2025 | NASCAR Truck Series | Spire Motorsports | 25 | 1 | 5 | 13 | 2237 | 6th |
| 2025 | NASCAR Xfinity Series | Jordan Anderson Racing; Hendrick Motorsports | 3 | 0 | 0 | 0 | 0 | NC† |

^{†} As Caruth was a guest driver, he was ineligible for championship points.

=== NASCAR ===
(key) (Bold – Pole position awarded by qualifying time. Italics – Pole position earned by points standings or practice time. * – Most laps led.)

==== O'Reilly Auto Parts Series ====
NASCAR O'Reilly Auto Parts Series results
| Year | Team | No. | Make | 1 | 2 | 3 | 4 | 5 | 6 | 7 | 8 | 9 | 10 | 11 | 12 | 13 | 14 | 15 | 16 | 17 | 18 | 19 | 20 | 21 | 22 | 23 | 24 | 25 | 26 | 27 | 28 | 29 | 30 | 31 | 32 | 33 | NOAPSC | Pts | Ref |
|---|---|---|---|---|---|---|---|---|---|---|---|---|---|---|---|---|---|---|---|---|---|---|---|---|---|---|---|---|---|---|---|---|---|---|---|---|---|---|---|
| 2022 | Alpha Prime Racing | 44 | Chevy | DAY | CAL | LVS | PHO | ATL | COA | RCH; 24 | MAR | TAL | DOV; 38 | DAR | TEX | CLT | PIR | NSH | ROA | ATL | NHA | POC; 38 | IRC | MCH | GLN | DAY | DAR | | | | | | LVS; 20 | HOM | MAR; 12 | PHO; 17 | 92nd | 0^{1} | |
| 2022 | Alpha Prime Racing | 45 | Chevy | | | | | | | | | | | | | | | | | | | | | | | | | KAN; 25 | BRI | TEX | TAL | ROV | | | | | 92nd | 0^{1} | |
| 2023 | Alpha Prime Racing | 45 | Chevy | DAY | CAL; 21 | LVS; 26 | PHO | ATL | COA | RCH | MAR | TAL | DOV; 26 | DAR | | | | | | | | | | | | | | DAR; 16 | KAN; 29 | | | | LVS; 23 | HOM | | | 90th | 0^{1} | |
| 2023 | Alpha Prime Racing | 44 | Chevy | | | | | | | | | | | | CLT; 25 | PIR | SON | NSH | CSC | ATL | NHA; 37 | POC | ROA | MCH | IRC | GLN | DAY | | | BRI; 17 | TEX | ROV; 19 | | | MAR; 12 | | 90th | 0^{1} | |
| 2023 | Hendrick Motorsports | 17 | Chevy | | | | | | | | | | | | | | | | | | | | | | | | | | | | | | | | | PHO; 14 | 90th | 0^{1} | |
| 2025 | Jordan Anderson Racing | 32 | Chevy | DAY | ATL | COA | PHO | LVS | HOM | MAR | DAR | BRI | CAR | TAL | TEX | CLT | NSH | MXC | POC | ATL | CSC | SON | DOV; 22 | IND | IOW | GLN | DAY; 29 | PIR | GTW | BRI | | | | | | | 92nd | 0^{1} | |
| 2025 | Hendrick Motorsports | 17 | Chevy | | | | | | | | | | | | | | | | | | | | | | | | | | | | KAN; 18 | ROV | LVS | TAL | MAR | PHO | 92nd | 0^{1} | |
| 2026 | JR Motorsports | 88 | Chevy | DAY; 10 | ATL; 8 | COA; 31 | | | | MAR; 25 | CAR; 4 | | | TAL; 30 | | GLN; 12 | DOV; 14 | CLT; 10 | | | COR; 22 | SON; 14 | | ATL; 9 | | IOW; 2 | **DAY**; 32 | DAR; 26 | GTW; 11 | BRI; 23 | LVS; 11 | CLT; 36 | PHO; 9 | TAL; 17 | MAR; 16 | HOM; 18 | 12th | 2224 | |
| 2026 | Jordan Anderson Racing | 32 | Chevy | | | | PHO; 8 | LVS; 19 | DAR; 23 | | | BRI; 14 | KAN; 21 | | TEX; 34 | | | | NSH; 19 | POC; 7 | | | CHI; 24 | | IND; 22 | | | | | | | | | | | | 12th | 2224 | |

==== Craftsman Truck Series ====
NASCAR Craftsman Truck Series results
| Year | Team | No. | Make | 1 | 2 | 3 | 4 | 5 | 6 | 7 | 8 | 9 | 10 | 11 | 12 | 13 | 14 | 15 | 16 | 17 | 18 | 19 | 20 | 21 | 22 | 23 | 24 | 25 | NCTC | Pts | Ref |
|---|---|---|---|---|---|---|---|---|---|---|---|---|---|---|---|---|---|---|---|---|---|---|---|---|---|---|---|---|---|---|---|
| 2022 | Spire Motorsports | 7 | Chevy | DAY | LVS | ATL | COA | MAR | BRD | DAR | KAN | TEX | CLT | GTW; 11 | SON | KNX | NSH | MOH | POC | IRP | RCH; 25 | KAN | BRI; 34 | TAL | HOM | PHO; 32 | | | 43rd | 46 | |
| 2023 | GMS Racing | 24 | Chevy | DAY; 29 | LVS; 29 | ATL; 25 | COA; 13 | TEX; 19 | BRD; 11 | MAR; 25 | KAN; 34 | DAR; 6 | NWS; 34 | CLT; 11 | GTW; 15 | NSH; 32 | MOH; 29 | POC; 16 | RCH; 19 | IRP; 7 | MLW; 14 | KAN; 12 | BRI; 6 | TAL; 12 | HOM; 8 | PHO; 12 | | | 16th | 482 | |
| 2024 | Spire Motorsports | 71 | Chevy | DAY; 3 | ATL; 8 | **LVS**; 1 | BRI; 8 | COA; 15 | MAR; 7 | TEX; 12 | KAN; 13 | DAR; 30 | NWS; 14 | CLT; 16 | GTW; 16 | NSH; 4 | POC; 10 | **IRP**; 8 | RCH; 17 | MLW; 18 | BRI; 3 | KAN; 7 | TAL; 4 | HOM; 8 | MAR; 31 | PHO; 13 | | | 7th | 2213 | |
| 2025 | Spire Motorsports | 71 | Chevy | DAY; 30 | ATL; 29 | LVS; 7 | HOM; 22 | MAR; 8 | BRI; 9 | CAR; 4 | TEX; 3 | KAN; 21 | NWS; 15 | CLT; 9 | NSH; 1* | MCH; 31 | POC; 10 | LRP; 21 | IRP; 10 | GLN; 32 | RCH; 19 | DAR; 12 | BRI; 15 | NHA; 10 | ROV; 4 | TAL; 9 | MAR; 34 | PHO; 5 | 6th | 2237 | |
| 2026 | Spire Motorsports | 7 | Chevy | DAY | ATL | STP | DAR | CAR | BRI | TEX | GLN | DOV | CLT | NSH; 2 | MCH | COR | LRP | NWS | IRP | RCH | NHA | BRI | KAN | | | | | | 99th | 0^{1} | |
| 2026 | Spire Motorsports | 77 | Chevy | | | | | | | | | | | | | | | | | | | | | CLT; 31 | PHO | TAL | MAR | HOM | 99th | 0^{1} | |

^{*} Season still in progress
^{1} Ineligible for series points

=== ARCA Menards Series ===
(key) (Bold – Pole position awarded by qualifying time. Italics – Pole position earned by points standings or practice time. * – Most laps led. ** – All laps led.)

ARCA Menards Series results
| Year | Team | No. | Make | 1 | 2 | 3 | 4 | 5 | 6 | 7 | 8 | 9 | 10 | 11 | 12 | 13 | 14 | 15 | 16 | 17 | 18 | 19 | 20 | AMSC | Pts | Ref |
|---|---|---|---|---|---|---|---|---|---|---|---|---|---|---|---|---|---|---|---|---|---|---|---|---|---|---|
| 2021 | Rev Racing | 6 | Chevy | DAY | PHO | TAL | KAN | TOL | CLT | MOH | POC | ELK | BLN | IOW; 9 | WIN | GLN | MCH | ISF | MLW; 13 | DSF | BRI; 6 | SLM; 3 | KAN; 9 | 23rd | 180 | |
| 2022 | Rev Racing | 6 | Chevy | DAY; 11 | | TAL; 6 | KAN; 2 | CLT; 3 | IOW; 12 | BLN; 5 | ELK; 7 | MOH; 9 | POC; 4 | IRP; 8 | MCH; 6 | GLN; 11 | ISF; 6 | MLW; 4 | DSF; 17 | KAN; 12 | BRI; 4 | SLM; 15 | TOL; 5 | 3rd | 932 | |
| 2022 | Rev Racing | 61 | Chevy | | PHO; 4 | | | | | | | | | | | | | | | | | | | 3rd | 932 | |

==== ARCA Menards Series East ====
ARCA Menards Series East results
| Year | Team | No. | Make | 1 | 2 | 3 | 4 | 5 | 6 | 7 | 8 | AMSEC | Pts | Ref |
|---|---|---|---|---|---|---|---|---|---|---|---|---|---|---|
| 2021 | Rev Racing | 6 | Chevy | NSM; 11 | FIF; 4 | NSV; 6 | DOV; 14 | SNM; 3 | IOW; 9 | MLW; 13 | BRI; 6 | 3rd | 386 | |
| 2022 | Rev Racing | 6 | Chevy | NSM | FIF | DOV; 4 | NSV | IOW; 12 | MLW; 4 | BRI; 4 | | 8th | 202 | |

==== ARCA Menards Series West ====
ARCA Menards Series West results
| Year | Team | No. | Make | 1 | 2 | 3 | 4 | 5 | 6 | 7 | 8 | 9 | 10 | 11 | AMSWC | Pts | Ref |
|---|---|---|---|---|---|---|---|---|---|---|---|---|---|---|---|---|---|
| 2021 | Rev Racing | 66 | Chevy | PHO | SON | IRW | CNS | IRW | PIR | LVS | AAS | PHO; 8 | | | 47th | 36 | |
| 2022 | Rev Racing | 61 | Chevy | PHO; 4 | IRW | KCR | PIR | SON | IRW | EVG | PIR | AAS | LVS | PHO | 49th | 40 | |

=== CARS Late Model Stock Car Tour ===
(key) (Bold – Pole position awarded by qualifying time. Italics – Pole position earned by points standings or practice time. * – Most laps led. ** – All laps led.)

CARS Late Model Stock Car Tour results
| Year | Team | No. | Make | 1 | 2 | 3 | 4 | 5 | 6 | 7 | 8 | 9 | 10 | 11 | 12 | 13 | 14 | 15 | 16 | 17 | CLMSCTC | Pts | Ref |
|---|---|---|---|---|---|---|---|---|---|---|---|---|---|---|---|---|---|---|---|---|---|---|---|
| 2022 | Carroll Speedshop | 8RC | Chevy | CRW | HCY | GRE | AAS | FCS | LGY | DOM | HCY; DNQ | ACE | MMS | NWS | TCM | ACE | SBO | CRW | | | 80th | 2 | |
| 2024 | R&S Race Cars | 71 | Chevy | SNM | HCY | AAS | OCS | ACE | TCM | LGY | DOM | CRW | HCY | NWS | ACE | WCS | FLC; 20 | SBO | TCM | NWS | N/A | 0 | |
