= 2018 North Carolina Education Lottery 200 =

Race details
- Race 7 of 23 of the 2018 NASCAR Camping World Truck Series
- Date: May 18, 2018
- Official name: North Carolina Education Lottery 200
- Location: Concord, North Carolina, Charlotte Motor Speedway
- Course: Permanent racing facility
- Course length: 1.5 miles (2.41 km)
- Distance: 134 laps, 201 mi (323.478 km)
- Scheduled distance: 134 laps, 201 mi (323.478 km)
- Average speed: 112.675 miles per hour (181.333 km/h)

Pole position
Driver	Johnny Sauter	GMS Racing
- Time: N/A

Most laps led
Driver	Johnny Sauter	GMS Racing
- Laps: 71

Winner
No. 21	Johnny Sauter	GMS Racing

Television in the United States
- Network: Fox Sports 1
- Announcers: Vince Welch, Phil Parsons, Michael Waltrip

Radio in the United States
- Radio: Motor Racing Network

The 2018 North Carolina Education Lottery 200 was the seventh stock car race of the 2018 NASCAR Camping World Truck Series season, and the 16th iteration of the event. The race was held on Friday, May 18, 2018 in Concord, North Carolina at Charlotte Motor Speedway, a 1.5 miles (2.4 km) tri-oval permanent racetrack. The race took the scheduled 134 laps to complete. Johnny Sauter of GMS Racing would dominate the race and win the race, the 20th of his career and the 2nd of the season. To fill the podium, Kyle Busch and Brandon Jones, both from Kyle Busch Motorsports would finish 2nd and 3rd, respectively.

== Background ==
The layout of Charlotte Motor Speedway, the venue where the race was held.

The race was held at Charlotte Motor Speedway, located in Concord, North Carolina. The speedway complex includes a 1.5-mile (2.4 km) quad-oval track that was utilized for the race, as well as a dragstrip and a dirt track. The speedway was built in 1959 by Bruton Smith and is considered the home track for NASCAR with many race teams based in the Charlotte metropolitan area. The track is owned and operated by Speedway Motorsports Inc. (SMI) with Marcus G. Smith serving as track president.

=== Entry list ===
#	Driver	Team	Make	Sponsor
1	?*	TJL Motorsports	Chevrolet	
2	Cody Coughlin	GMS Racing	Chevrolet	Jegs
02	Austin Hill	Young's Motorsports	Chevrolet	United Rentals
3	Jordan Anderson	Jordan Anderson Racing	Chevrolet	Bommarito Automotive Group
4	Todd Gilliland	Kyle Busch Motorsports	Toyota	Pedigree
6	Norm Benning	Norm Benning Racing	Chevrolet	Zomongo
7	Korbin Forrister	All Out Motorsports	Toyota	N. O. W. Matters More
8	John Hunter Nemechek	NEMCO Motorsports	Chevrolet	Fleetwing
10	Jennifer Jo Cobb	Jennifer Jo Cobb Racing	Chevrolet	Mark One Electric, Think Realty
13	Myatt Snider	ThorSport Racing	Ford	Century Container
15	Robby Lyons	Premium Motorsports	Chevrolet	Abaco Construction
16	Brett Moffitt	Hattori Racing Enterprises	Toyota	Ibaraki Toyopet
17	Bo LeMastus	DGR-Crosley	Toyota	Crosley Brands
18	Noah Gragson	Kyle Busch Motorsports	Toyota	Safelite Auto Glass
20	Daniel Hemric	Young's Motorsports	Chevrolet	Overkill Motorsports
21	Johnny Sauter	GMS Racing	Chevrolet	ISM Connect Patriotic
22	Austin Wayne Self	Niece Motorsports	Chevrolet	AM Technical Solutions, GO TEXAN. "Don't mess with Texas"
24	Justin Haley	GMS Racing	Chevrolet	Fraternal Order of Eagles
25	Dalton Sargeant	GMS Racing	Chevrolet	Performance Plus Motor Oil
33	Josh Reaume	Reaume Brothers Racing	Chevrolet	IG Racing
41	Ben Rhodes	ThorSport Racing	Ford	Alpha Energy Solutions
45	Justin Fontaine	Niece Motorsports	Chevrolet	ProMatic Automation
46	Brandon Jones	Kyle Busch Motorsports	Toyota	Mobil 1
49	Wendell Chavous	Premium Motorsports	Chevrolet	SobrietyNation.org
50	Timmy Hill	Beaver Motorsports	Chevrolet	Crossbar E-Cigarettes
51	Kyle Busch	Kyle Busch Motorsports	Toyota	Beechcraft, Cessna
52	Stewart Friesen	Halmar Friesen Racing	Chevrolet	Halmar "We Build America"
54	Chris Eggleston	DGR-Crosley	Toyota	Globe Sprinkler
63	J. J. Yeley	Copp Motorsports	Chevrolet	Fr8Auctions
68	Clay Greenfield*	Clay Greenfield Motorsports	Chevrolet	AMVETS #PLEASESTAND
74	Mike Harmon	Mike Harmon Racing	Chevrolet	Horizon Transport. Professional Printers
75	Parker Kligerman	Henderson Motorsports	Chevrolet	Food Country USA, Tide Pods
83	Bayley Currey	Copp Motorsports	Chevrolet	Ingersoll Rand
87	Joe Nemechek*	NEMCO Motorsports	Chevrolet	
88	Matt Crafton	ThorSport Racing	Ford	Menards, Mold Armor
92	Timothy Peters	RBR Enterprises	Ford	BTS Tire & Wheel Distributors
97	Jesse Little	JJL Motorsports	Ford	JJL Motorsports, Circle Track Warehouse
98	Grant Enfinger	ThorSport Racing	Ford	Champion Power Equipment "Powering Your Life."
Official entry list

== Practice ==
=== First practice ===
First practice was held on Friday, May 18, at 9:05 AM EST. Matt Crafton of ThorSport Racing would set the fastest time with a 29.813 and an average speed of 181.129 miles per hour (291.499 km/h).

Austin Wayne Self of Niece Motorsports would hit the wall in the opening minutes of practice, forcing him to go to a backup truck.

Pos.	#	Driver	Team	Make	Time	Speed
1	88	Matt Crafton	ThorSport Racing	Ford	29.813	181.129
2	21	Johnny Sauter	GMS Racing	Chevrolet	29.835	180.995
3	18	Noah Gragson	Kyle Busch Motorsports	Toyota	29.956	180.264
Full first practice results

=== Second and final practice ===
Second and final practice was held on Friday, May 18, at 10:35 AM EST. Dalton Sargeant of GMS Racing would set the fastest time with a 30.176 and an average speed of 178.950 miles per hour (287.992 km/h).

Pos.	#	Driver	Team	Make	Time	Speed
1	25	Dalton Sargeant	GMS Racing	Chevrolet	30.176	178.950
2	41	Ben Rhodes	ThorSport Racing	Ford	30.242	178.560
3	24	Justin Haley	GMS Racing	Chevrolet	30.300	178.218
Full final practice results

== Starting lineup ==
Qualifying was meant to be held on Friday, May 18, but rain would force the cancellation of qualifying. As a result, the starting lineup was determined by owner's points. Johnny Sauter of GMS Racing would end up winning the pole for the race.

Due to the cancellation, Korbin Forrister, Timothy Peters, and Bo LeMastus would all not qualify for the race.

Pos.	#	Driver	Team	Make
1	21	Johnny Sauter	GMS Racing	Chevrolet
2	18	Noah Gragson	Kyle Busch Motorsports	Toyota
3	4	Todd Gilliland	Kyle Busch Motorsports	Toyota
4	51	Kyle Busch	Kyle Busch Motorsports	Toyota
5	98	Grant Enfinger	ThorSport Racing	Ford
6	16	Brett Moffitt	Hattori Racing Enterprises	Toyota
7	41	Ben Rhodes	ThorSport Racing	Ford
8	88	Matt Crafton	ThorSport Racing	Ford
9	8	John Hunter Nemechek	NEMCO Motorsports	Chevrolet
10	52	Stewart Friesen	Halmar Friesen Racing	Chevrolet
11	24	Justin Haley	GMS Racing	Chevrolet
12	25	Dalton Sargeant	GMS Racing	Chevrolet
13	13	Myatt Snider	ThorSport Racing	Ford
14	54	Chris Eggleston	DGR-Crosley	Toyota
15	2	Cody Coughlin	GMS Racing	Chevrolet
16	20	Daniel Hemric	Young's Motorsports	Chevrolet
17	02	Austin Hill	Young's Motorsports	Chevrolet
18	45	Justin Fontaine	Niece Motorsports	Chevrolet
19	22	Austin Wayne Self	Niece Motorsports	Chevrolet
20	49	Wendell Chavous	Premium Motorsports	Chevrolet
21	3	Jordan Anderson	Jordan Anderson Racing	Chevrolet
22	83	Bayley Currey	Copp Motorsports	Chevrolet
23	15	Robby Lyons	Premium Motorsports	Chevrolet
24	97	Jesse Little	JJL Motorsports	Ford
25	6	Norm Benning	Norm Benning Racing	Chevrolet
26	10	Jennifer Jo Cobb	Jennifer Jo Cobb Racing	Chevrolet
27	75	Parker Kligerman	Henderson Motorsports	Chevrolet
28	46	Brandon Jones	Kyle Busch Motorsports	Toyota
29	33	Josh Reaume	Reaume Brothers Racing	Chevrolet
30	50	Timmy Hill	Beaver Motorsports	Chevrolet
31	74	Mike Harmon	Mike Harmon Racing	Chevrolet
32	63	J. J. Yeley	Copp Motorsports	Chevrolet
Failed to qualify or withdrew
33	7	Korbin Forrister	All Out Motorsports	Toyota
34	92	Timothy Peters	RBR Enterprises	Ford
35	17	Bo LeMastus	DGR-Crosley	Toyota
WD	1	?	TJL Motorsports	Chevrolet
WD	68	Clay Greenfield	Clay Greenfield Motorsports	Chevrolet
WD	87	Joe Nemechek	NEMCO Motorsports	Chevrolet
Official starting lineup

== Race results ==
Stage 1 Laps: 40

Fin	#	Driver	Team	Make	Pts
1	16	Brett Moffitt	Hattori Racing Enterprises	Toyota	10
2	24	Justin Haley	GMS Racing	Chevrolet	9
3	21	Johnny Sauter	GMS Racing	Chevrolet	8
4	25	Dalton Sargeant	GMS Racing	Chevrolet	7
5	8	John Hunter Nemechek	NEMCO Motorsports	Chevrolet	0
6	51	Kyle Busch	Kyle Busch Motorsports	Toyota	0
7	75	Parker Kligerman	Henderson Motorsports	Chevrolet	4
8	4	Todd Gilliland	Kyle Busch Motorsports	Toyota	3
9	88	Matt Crafton	ThorSport Racing	Ford	2
10	97	Jesse Little	JJL Motorsports	Ford	1

Stage 2 Laps: 40

Fin	#	Driver	Team	Make	Pts
1	8	John Hunter Nemechek	NEMCO Motorsports	Chevrolet	0
2	51	Kyle Busch	Kyle Busch Motorsports	Toyota	0
3	16	Brett Moffitt	Hattori Racing Enterprises	Toyota	8
4	4	Todd Gilliland	Kyle Busch Motorsports	Toyota	7
5	21	Johnny Sauter	GMS Racing	Chevrolet	6
6	41	Ben Rhodes	ThorSport Racing	Ford	5
7	88	Matt Crafton	ThorSport Racing	Ford	4
8	24	Justin Haley	GMS Racing	Chevrolet	3
9	46	Brandon Jones	Kyle Busch Motorsports	Toyota	0
10	18	Noah Gragson	Kyle Busch Motorsports	Toyota	1

Stage 3 Laps: 54

Fin	St	#	Driver	Team	Make	Laps	Led	Status	Pts
1	1	21	Johnny Sauter	GMS Racing	Chevrolet	134	71	running	54
2	4	51	Kyle Busch	Kyle Busch Motorsports	Toyota	134	0	running	0
3	28	46	Brandon Jones	Kyle Busch Motorsports	Toyota	134	0	running	0
4	6	16	Brett Moffitt	Hattori Racing Enterprises	Toyota	134	28	running	51
5	7	41	Ben Rhodes	ThorSport Racing	Ford	134	0	running	37
6	10	52	Stewart Friesen	Halmar Friesen Racing	Chevrolet	134	0	running	31
7	27	75	Parker Kligerman	Henderson Motorsports	Chevrolet	134	0	running	34
8	2	18	Noah Gragson	Kyle Busch Motorsports	Toyota	134	13	running	30
9	9	8	John Hunter Nemechek	NEMCO Motorsports	Chevrolet	134	21	running	0
10	3	4	Todd Gilliland	Kyle Busch Motorsports	Toyota	134	0	running	37
11	8	88	Matt Crafton	ThorSport Racing	Ford	134	0	running	32
12	5	98	Grant Enfinger	ThorSport Racing	Ford	134	0	running	25
13	14	54	Chris Eggleston	DGR-Crosley	Toyota	134	0	running	24
14	11	24	Justin Haley	GMS Racing	Chevrolet	134	0	running	35
15	13	13	Myatt Snider	ThorSport Racing	Ford	134	0	running	22
16	24	97	Jesse Little	JJL Motorsports	Ford	134	0	running	22
17	15	2	Cody Coughlin	GMS Racing	Chevrolet	134	0	running	20
18	17	02	Austin Hill	Young's Motorsports	Chevrolet	134	0	running	19
19	12	25	Dalton Sargeant	GMS Racing	Chevrolet	134	0	running	25
20	21	3	Jordan Anderson	Jordan Anderson Racing	Chevrolet	134	1	running	17
21	16	20	Daniel Hemric	Young's Motorsports	Chevrolet	134	0	running	0
22	20	49	Wendell Chavous	Premium Motorsports	Chevrolet	134	0	running	15
23	23	15	Robby Lyons	Premium Motorsports	Chevrolet	134	0	running	14
24	29	33	Josh Reaume	Reaume Brothers Racing	Chevrolet	132	0	running	13
25	22	83	Bayley Currey	Copp Motorsports	Chevrolet	132	0	running	12
26	26	10	Jennifer Jo Cobb	Jennifer Jo Cobb Racing	Chevrolet	121	0	running	11
27	19	22	Austin Wayne Self	Niece Motorsports	Chevrolet	117	0	crash	10
28	30	50	Timmy Hill	Beaver Motorsports	Chevrolet	100	0	engine	0
29	31	74	Mike Harmon	Mike Harmon Racing	Chevrolet	99	0	running	0
30	18	45	Justin Fontaine	Niece Motorsports	Chevrolet	97	0	crash	7
31	25	6	Norm Benning	Norm Benning Racing	Chevrolet	55	0	crash	6
32	32	63	J. J. Yeley	Copp Motorsports	Chevrolet	21	0	transmission	0
Failed to qualify or withdrew
33		7	Korbin Forrister	All Out Motorsports	Toyota				
34		92	Timothy Peters	RBR Enterprises	Ford				
35		17	Bo LeMastus	DGR-Crosley	Toyota				
WD		1	?	TJL Motorsports	Chevrolet				
WD		68	Clay Greenfield	Clay Greenfield Motorsports	Chevrolet				
WD		87	Joe Nemechek	NEMCO Motorsports	Chevrolet				
Official race results

Previous race: 2018 37 Kind Days 250	NASCAR Camping World Truck Series; 2018 season	Next race: 2018 PPG 400
