= 2018 Ford EcoBoost 200 =

23rd race of the 2018 NASCAR Camping World Truck Series

Race details
- Race 23 of 23 of the 2018 NASCAR Camping World Truck Series
- Date: November 16, 2018
- Official name: 23rd Annual Ford EcoBoost 200
- Location: Homestead, Florida, Homestead-Miami Speedway
- Course: Permanent racing facility
- Course length: 1.5 miles (2.41 km)
- Distance: 134 laps, 201 mi (323.478 km)
- Scheduled distance: 134 laps, 201 mi (323.478 km)
- Average speed: 133.684 miles per hour (215.144 km/h)

Pole position
Driver	Grant Enfinger	ThorSport Racing
- Time: 31.887

Most laps led
Driver	Brett Moffitt	Hattori Racing Enterprises
- Laps: 59

Winner
No. 16	Brett Moffitt	Hattori Racing Enterprises

Television in the United States
- Network: Fox Sports 1
- Announcers: Vince Welch, Phil Parsons, Michael Waltrip

Radio in the United States
- Radio: Motor Racing Network

The 2018 Ford EcoBoost 200 was the 23rd and final stock car race of the 2018 NASCAR Camping World Truck Series, the championship race of the season, and the 23rd iteration of the event. The race was held on Friday, November 16, 2018, in Homestead, Florida at Homestead–Miami Speedway, a 1.5 miles (2.4 km) permanent oval-shaped racetrack. The race took the scheduled 134 laps to complete. At race's end, Brett Moffitt, driving for underfunded team Hattori Racing Enterprises, dominated the late stages of the race to win his first NASCAR Camping World Truck Series championship. The win was also Moffitt's seventh career NASCAR Camping World Truck Series win and his sixth and final win of the season. To fill out the podium, Grant Enfinger of ThorSport Racing and Noah Gragson of Kyle Busch Motorsports finished second and third, respectively.

== Background ==
The layout of Homestead–Miami Speedway, the venue where the race was held.

Homestead-Miami Speedway is a motor racing track located in Homestead, Florida. The track, which has several configurations, has promoted several series of racing, including NASCAR, the Verizon IndyCar Series, the Grand-Am Rolex Sports Car Series and the Championship Cup Series.

From 2002 to 2019, Homestead–Miami Speedway hosted the final race of the season in all three of NASCAR's series: the Cup Series, Xfinity Series, and the Camping World Truck Series. Ford Motor Company sponsored all three of the season-ending races, under the names Ford EcoBoost 400, Ford EcoBoost 300, and Ford EcoBoost 200, respectively. The weekend itself was marketed as Ford Championship Weekend. The Xfinity Series held its season-ending races at Homestead from 1995 until 2020, when it was moved to Phoenix Raceway, along with NASCAR's other two series.

=== Championship drivers ===
- Noah Gragson: Advanced by virtue of points.
- Justin Haley: Advanced by winning the 2018 JAG Metals 350.
- Brett Moffitt: Advanced by winning the 2018 Lucas Oil 150.
- Johnny Sauter: Advanced by winning the 2018 Texas Roadhouse 200.

=== Entry list ===
- (R) denotes rookie driver.
- (i) denotes driver who is ineligible for series driver points.
- (CC) denotes Championship Contender.

#	Driver	Team	Make	Sponsor
0	Ray Ciccarelli	Jennifer Jo Cobb Racing	Chevrolet	11 Health
2	Sheldon Creed	GMS Racing	Chevrolet	United Rentals
02	Austin Hill	Young's Motorsports	Chevrolet	Randco, Young's Building Systems
3	Jordan Anderson	Jordan Anderson Racing	Chevrolet	Bommarito Automotive Group, Knight Fire Protection
4	Todd Gilliland (R)	Kyle Busch Motorsports	Toyota	JBL, SiriusXM
04	Cory Roper	Roper Racing	Ford	Preferred Industrial Contractors, Inc.
8	John Hunter Nemechek (i)	NEMCO Motorsports	Chevrolet	Romco Equipment Co., Fleetwing
10	Jennifer Jo Cobb	Jennifer Jo Cobb Racing	Chevrolet	Driven2Honor.org
13	Myatt Snider (R)	ThorSport Racing	Ford	Tenda
15	Reid Wilson	Premium Motorsports	Chevrolet	TruNorth
16	Brett Moffitt (CC)	Hattori Racing Enterprises	Toyota	Aisin
18	Noah Gragson (CC)	Kyle Busch Motorsports	Toyota	Safelite Auto Glass
20	Tanner Thorson	Young's Motorsports	Chevrolet	GoShare
21	Johnny Sauter (CC)	GMS Racing	Chevrolet	ISM Connect
22	Austin Wayne Self	Niece Motorsports	Chevrolet	AM Technical Solutions, GO TEXAN.
24	Justin Haley (CC)	GMS Racing	Chevrolet	Fraternal Order of Eagles
25	Tyler Dippel	GMS Racing	Chevrolet	Vai Anitta
30	Jeb Burton (i)	On Point Motorsports	Toyota	Ultimate Headers
33	Robby Lyons (R)	Reaume Brothers Racing	Chevrolet	B&W Structural
35	Brennan Poole	NextGen Motorsports	Toyota	Solid Rock Carriers, Motorsports Safety Group
38	Ross Chastain	Niece Motorsports	Chevrolet	MG Machinery
41	Ben Rhodes	ThorSport Racing	Ford	The Carolina Nut Company
45	Justin Fontaine (R)	Niece Motorsports	Chevrolet	ProMatic Automation "Rage Against The Dying of the Light"
49	D. J. Kennington	Premium Motorsports	Chevrolet	SobrietyNation.org
50	Mike Harmon*	Beaver Motorsports	Chevrolet	SobrietyNation.org
51	Harrison Burton	Kyle Busch Motorsports	Toyota	DEX Imaging
52	Stewart Friesen	Halmar Friesen Racing	Chevrolet	Halmar "We Build America"
54	Chris Windom	DGR-Crosley	Toyota	Crosley Brands, Baldwin Brothers Racing
83	Todd Peck**	Copp Motorsports	Chevrolet	Pulse Transport, Inc.
87	Joe Nemechek	NEMCO Motorsports	Chevrolet	D.A.B. Constructors, Inc.
88	Matt Crafton	ThorSport Racing	Ford	Menards, Ideal Door
97	Jesse Little	JJL Motorsports	Ford	SkuttleTight
98	Grant Enfinger	ThorSport Racing	Ford	Champion Power Equipment "Powering Your Life."
Official entry list

*Driver changed to Camden Murphy.

**Withdrew due to wrecking in first practice.

== Practice ==
=== First practice ===
The first practice session was held on Friday, November 16, at 8:35 a.m. EST, and would last for 50 minutes. Johnny Sauter of GMS Racing would set the fastest time in the session, with a lap of 31.678 and an average speed of 170.465 miles per hour (274.337 km/h).

Pos.	#	Driver	Team	Make	Time	Speed
1	21	Johnny Sauter	GMS Racing	Chevrolet	31.678	170.465
2	98	Grant Enfinger	ThorSport Racing	Ford	31.737	170.148
3	16	Brett Moffitt	Hattori Racing Enterprises	Toyota	32.253	167.426
Full first practice results

=== Second and final practice ===
The second and final practice session, sometimes referred to as Happy Hour, was held on Friday, November 16, at 10:05 a.m. EST, and would last for 50 minutes. Justin Haley of GMS Racing would set the fastest time in the session, with a lap of 32.308 and an average speed of 167.141 miles per hour (268.987 km/h).

Pos.	#	Driver	Team	Make	Time	Speed
1	24	Justin Haley	GMS Racing	Chevrolet	32.308	167.141
2	18	Noah Gragson	Kyle Busch Motorsports	Toyota	32.355	166.898
3	51	Harrison Burton	Kyle Busch Motorsports	Toyota	32.541	165.945
Full Happy Hour practice results

== Qualifying ==
Qualifying was held on Friday, November 16, at 3:45 p.m. EST. Since Homestead–Miami Speedway is at least a 1.5 miles (2.4 km) racetrack, the qualifying system was a single car, single lap, two round system where in the first round, everyone would set a time to determine positions 13–32. Then, the fastest 12 qualifiers would move on to the second round to determine positions 1–12.

Grant Enfinger of ThorSport Racing would win the pole, setting a lap of 31.887 and an average speed of 169.348 miles per hour (272.539 km/h) in the second round.

No drivers would fail to qualify.

=== Full qualifying results ===
Pos.	#	Driver	Team	Make	Time (R1)	Speed (R1)	Time (R2)	Speed (R2)
1	98	Grant Enfinger	ThorSport Racing	Ford	31.913	169.210	31.887	169.348
2	52	Stewart Friesen	Halmar Friesen Racing	Chevrolet	32.365	166.847	31.912	169.215
3	18	Noah Gragson	Kyle Busch Motorsports	Toyota	31.961	168.956	31.990	168.803
4	24	Justin Haley	GMS Racing	Chevrolet	32.117	168.135	32.103	168.209
5	16	Brett Moffitt	Hattori Racing Enterprises	Toyota	32.074	168.361	32.131	168.062
6	21	Johnny Sauter	GMS Racing	Chevrolet	32.139	168.020	32.231	167.541
7	38	Ross Chastain	Niece Motorsports	Chevrolet	32.051	168.481	32.258	167.400
8	8	John Hunter Nemechek	NEMCO Motorsports	Chevrolet	32.406	166.636	32.290	167.234
9	97	Jesse Little	JJL Motorsports	Ford	32.172	167.848	32.312	167.121
10	54	Chris Windom	DGR-Crosley	Toyota	32.346	166.945	32.468	166.318
11	41	Ben Rhodes	ThorSport Racing	Ford	32.432	166.502	32.554	165.878
12	13	Myatt Snider	ThorSport Racing	Ford	32.380	166.770	32.565	165.822
Eliminated in Round 1
13	2	Sheldon Creed	GMS Racing	Chevrolet	32.517	166.067	—	—
14	51	Harrison Burton	Kyle Busch Motorsports	Toyota	32.538	165.960	—	—
15	4	Todd Gilliland	Kyle Busch Motorsports	Toyota	32.544	165.929	—	—
16	02	Austin Hill	Young's Motorsports	Chevrolet	32.555	165.873	—	—
17	25	Tyler Dippel	GMS Racing	Chevrolet	32.579	165.751	—	—
18	33	Robby Lyons	Reaume Brothers Racing	Chevrolet	32.584	165.726	—	—
19	04	Cory Roper	Roper Racing	Ford	32.599	165.649	—	—
20	87	Joe Nemechek	NEMCO Motorsports	Chevrolet	32.658	165.350	—	—
21	30	Jeb Burton	On Point Motorsports	Toyota	32.737	164.951	—	—
22	88	Matt Crafton	ThorSport Racing	Ford	32.745	164.911	—	—
23	35	Brennan Poole	NextGen Motorsports	Toyota	32.853	164.369	—	—
24	22	Austin Wayne Self	Niece Motorsports	Chevrolet	33.193	162.685	—	—
25	3	Jordan Anderson	Jordan Anderson Racing	Chevrolet	33.240	162.455	—	—
26	20	Tanner Thorson	Young's Motorsports	Chevrolet	33.368	161.832	—	—
27	49	D. J. Kennington	Premium Motorsports	Chevrolet	33.740	160.047	—	—
Qualified by owner's points
28	10	Jennifer Jo Cobb	Jennifer Jo Cobb Racing	Chevrolet	33.822	159.659	—	—
29	0	Ray Ciccarelli	Jennifer Jo Cobb Racing	Chevrolet	34.012	158.767	—	—
30	15	Reid Wilson	Premium Motorsports	Chevrolet	34.416	156.904	—	—
31	45	Justin Fontaine	Niece Motorsports	Chevrolet	34.629	155.939	—	—
Qualified by time
32	50	Camden Murphy	Beaver Motorsports	Chevrolet	34.934	154.577	—	—
Official qualifying results
Official starting lineup

== Race results ==
- Note: Noah Gragson, Justin Haley, Brett Moffitt, and Johnny Sauter are not eligible for stage points because of their participation in the Championship 4.

Stage 1 Laps: 30

Pos.	#	Driver	Team	Make	Pts
1	98	Grant Enfinger	ThorSport Racing	Ford	10
2	18	Noah Gragson	Kyle Busch Motorsports	Toyota	0
3	16	Brett Moffitt	Hattori Racing Enterprises	Toyota	0
4	8	John Hunter Nemechek	NEMCO Motorsports	Chevrolet	0
5	88	Matt Crafton	ThorSport Racing	Ford	5
6	24	Justin Haley	GMS Racing	Chevrolet	0
7	52	Stewart Friesen	Halmar Friesen Racing	Chevrolet	4
8	97	Jesse Little	JJL Motorsports	Ford	3
9	41	Ben Rhodes	ThorSport Racing	Ford	2
10	2	Sheldon Creed	GMS Racing	Chevrolet	1

Stage 2 Laps: 30

Pos.	#	Driver	Team	Make	Pts
1	16	Brett Moffitt	Hattori Racing Enterprises	Toyota	0
2	18	Noah Gragson	Kyle Busch Motorsports	Toyota	0
3	98	Grant Enfinger	ThorSport Racing	Ford	8
4	88	Matt Crafton	ThorSport Racing	Ford	7
5	8	John Hunter Nemechek	NEMCO Motorsports	Chevrolet	0
6	52	Stewart Friesen	Halmar Friesen Racing	Chevrolet	5
7	97	Jesse Little	JJL Motorsports	Ford	4
8	24	Justin Haley	GMS Racing	Chevrolet	0
9	2	Sheldon Creed	GMS Racing	Chevrolet	2
10	21	Johnny Sauter	GMS Racing	Chevrolet	0

Stage 3 Laps: 74

Fin	St	#	Driver	Team	Make	Laps	Led	Status	Pts
1	5	16	Brett Moffitt	Hattori Racing Enterprises	Toyota	134	59	running	40
2	1	98	Grant Enfinger	ThorSport Racing	Ford	134	33	running	53
3	3	18	Noah Gragson	Kyle Busch Motorsports	Toyota	134	34	running	34
4	2	52	Stewart Friesen	Halmar Friesen Racing	Chevrolet	134	0	running	42
5	13	2	Sheldon Creed	GMS Racing	Chevrolet	134	1	running	35
6	22	88	Matt Crafton	ThorSport Racing	Ford	134	4	running	44
7	8	8	John Hunter Nemechek	NEMCO Motorsports	Chevrolet	134	0	running	0
8	4	24	Justin Haley	GMS Racing	Chevrolet	134	0	running	29
9	9	97	Jesse Little	JJL Motorsports	Ford	134	0	running	35
10	11	41	Ben Rhodes	ThorSport Racing	Ford	134	2	running	29
11	14	51	Harrison Burton	Kyle Busch Motorsports	Toyota	134	0	running	26
12	6	21	Johnny Sauter	GMS Racing	Chevrolet	134	0	running	25
13	15	4	Todd Gilliland	Kyle Busch Motorsports	Toyota	133	0	running	24
14	12	13	Myatt Snider	ThorSport Racing	Ford	133	0	running	23
15	17	25	Tyler Dippel	GMS Racing	Chevrolet	133	0	running	22
16	7	38	Ross Chastain	Niece Motorsports	Chevrolet	133	0	running	0
17	19	04	Cory Roper	Roper Racing	Ford	133	0	running	20
18	21	30	Jeb Burton	On Point Motorsports	Toyota	132	0	running	0
19	23	35	Brennan Poole	NextGen Motorsports	Toyota	132	0	running	18
20	25	3	Jordan Anderson	Jordan Anderson Racing	Chevrolet	132	1	running	17
21	16	02	Austin Hill	Young's Motorsports	Chevrolet	132	0	running	16
22	31	45	Justin Fontaine	Niece Motorsports	Chevrolet	131	0	running	15
23	24	22	Austin Wayne Self	Niece Motorsports	Chevrolet	130	0	running	14
24	10	54	Chris Windom	DGR-Crosley	Toyota	130	0	running	13
25	29	0	Ray Ciccarelli	Jennifer Jo Cobb Racing	Chevrolet	129	0	running	12
26	27	49	D. J. Kennington	Premium Motorsports	Chevrolet	129	0	running	11
27	18	33	Robby Lyons	Reaume Brothers Racing	Chevrolet	124	0	running	10
28	28	10	Jennifer Jo Cobb	Jennifer Jo Cobb Racing	Chevrolet	124	0	running	9
29	26	20	Tanner Thorson	Young's Motorsports	Chevrolet	120	0	engine	8
30	30	15	Reid Wilson	Premium Motorsports	Chevrolet	80	0	engine	7
31	20	87	Joe Nemechek	NEMCO Motorsports	Chevrolet	20	0	suspension	6
32	32	50	Camden Murphy	Beaver Motorsports	Chevrolet	11	0	vibration	5
Withdrew
WD		83	Todd Peck	Copp Motorsports	Chevrolet				
Official race results

Previous race: 2018 Lucas Oil 150	NASCAR Camping World Truck Series; 2018 season	Next race: 2019 NextEra Energy 250
