= 2018 JEGS 200 =

Race details
- Race 5 of 23 of the 2018 NASCAR Camping World Truck Series
- Date: May 4, 2018
- Official name: JEGS 200
- Location: Dover, Delaware, Dover International Speedway
- Course: Permanent racing facility
- Course length: 1 miles (1.6 km)
- Distance: 210 laps, 210 mi (337.961 km)
- Scheduled distance: 200 laps, 200 mi (321.868 km)
- Average speed: 98.386 miles per hour (158.337 km/h)

Pole position
| Driver | Noah Gragson | Kyle Busch Motorsports |
- Time: 22.834

Most laps led
| Driver | Johnny Sauter | GMS Racing |
- Laps: 137

Winner
| No. 21 | Johnny Sauter | GMS Racing |

Television in the United States
- Network: Fox Sports 1
- Announcers: Vince Welch, Phil Parsons, Michael Waltrip

Radio in the United States
- Radio: Motor Racing Network

The 2018 JEGS 200 was the fifth stock car race of the 2018 NASCAR Camping World Truck Series season, and the 19th iteration of the event. The race was held on Friday, May 4, 2018 in Dover, Delaware at Dover International Speedway, a 1 mile (1.6 km) oval-shaped permanent racetrack. The race was extended from the scheduled 200 laps to 210 laps due to a late race caution including Noah Gragson, Johnny Sauter of GMS Racing would be able to hold off the field on the final restart to take the win, the 19th of his career and the 2nd of the season. To fill out the podium, Matt Crafton of ThorSport Racing and Justin Haley of GMS Racing would finish 2nd and 3rd, respectively.

== Background ==
The layout of Dover International Speedway, the venue where the race was held.

Dover International Speedway is an oval race track in Dover, Delaware, United States that has held at least two NASCAR races since it opened in 1969. In addition to NASCAR, the track also hosted USAC and the NTT IndyCar Series. The track features one layout, a 1 mile (1.6 km) concrete oval, with 24° banking in the turns and 9° banking on the straights. The speedway is owned and operated by Dover Motorsports.

The track, nicknamed "The Monster Mile", was built in 1969 by Melvin Joseph of Melvin L. Joseph Construction Company, Inc., with an asphalt surface, but was replaced with concrete in 1995. Six years later in 2001, the track's capacity moved to 135,000 seats, making the track have the largest capacity of sports venue in the mid-Atlantic. In 2002, the name changed to Dover International Speedway from Dover Downs International Speedway after Dover Downs Gaming and Entertainment split, making Dover Motorsports. From 2007 to 2009, the speedway worked on an improvement project called "The Monster Makeover", which expanded facilities at the track and beautified the track. After the 2014 season, the track's capacity was reduced to 95,500 seats.

=== Entry list ===
| # | Driver | Team | Make | Sponsor |
|---|---|---|---|---|
| 0 | Joey Gase* | Jennifer Jo Cobb Racing | Chevrolet | Driven2Honor.org |
| 1 | Ray Ciccarelli* | TJL Motorsports | Chevrolet | |
| 2 | Cody Coughlin | GMS Racing | Chevrolet | Jegs |
| 02 | Austin Hill | Young's Motorsports | Chevrolet | United Rentals |
| 3 | Jordan Anderson | Jordan Anderson Racing | Chevrolet | Bommarito Automotive Group, Knight Fire Protection |
| 4 | Todd Gilliland | Kyle Busch Motorsports | Toyota | Pedigree |
| 6 | Norm Benning | Norm Benning Racing | Chevrolet | Zomongo |
| 7 | Korbin Forrister | All Out Motorsports | Toyota | All Out Motorsports |
| 8 | Joe Nemechek | NEMCO Motorsports | Chevrolet | Acme |
| 10 | Jennifer Jo Cobb | Jennifer Jo Cobb Racing | Chevrolet | Driven2Honor.org, ThinkRealty.com |
| 13 | Myatt Snider | ThorSport Racing | Ford | Louisiana Hot Sauce |
| 15 | Reed Sorenson | Premium Motorsports | Chevrolet | Premium Motorsports |
| 16 | Brett Moffitt | Hattori Racing Enterprises | Toyota | Aisin |
| 18 | Noah Gragson | Kyle Busch Motorsports | Toyota | Safelite Auto Glass |
| 20 | Tanner Thorson | Young's Motorsports | Chevrolet | GoShare |
| 21 | Johnny Sauter | GMS Racing | Chevrolet | Allegiant Air |
| 22 | Austin Wayne Self | Niece Motorsports | Chevrolet | Flying Circle, GO TEXAN. "Don't mess with Texas" |
| 24 | Justin Haley | GMS Racing | Chevrolet | Fraternal Order of Eagles |
| 25 | Dalton Sargeant | GMS Racing | Chevrolet | Performance Plus Motor Oil |
| 33 | Josh Reaume | Reaume Brothers Racing | Toyota | Green Heart Partners, R-Coin |
| 41 | Ben Rhodes | ThorSport Racing | Ford | Alpha Energy Solutions |
| 45 | Justin Fontaine | Niece Motorsports | Chevrolet | ProMatic Automation |
| 49 | Wendell Chavous | Premium Motorsports | Chevrolet | SobrietyNation.org |
| 50 | Todd Peck | Beaver Motorsports | Chevrolet | Beaver Motorsports |
| 51 | Harrison Burton | Kyle Busch Motorsports | Toyota | DEX Imaging |
| 52 | Stewart Friesen | Halmar Friesen Racing | Chevrolet | Halmar "We Build America" |
| 54 | David Gilliland | DGR-Crosley | Toyota | Frontline Enterprises |
| 63 | Camden Murphy | Copp Motorsports | Chevrolet | First Responder Racing |
| 74 | Mike Harmon | Mike Harmon Racing | Chevrolet | Horizon Transport |
| 75 | Parker Kligerman | Henderson Motorsports | Chevrolet | Food Country USA, Utz Brands |
| 83 | Bayley Currey | Copp Motorsports | Chevrolet | Fr8Auctions |
| 88 | Matt Crafton | ThorSport Racing | Ford | Menards, Chi-Chi's |
| 97 | Jesse Little | JJL Motorsports | Ford | PFC Brakes "No Compromises" |
| 98 | Grant Enfinger | ThorSport Racing | Ford | Curb Records |

*Withdrew.

== Practice ==
=== First practice ===
First practice was held on 2:05 PM EST. Stewart Friesen of Halmar Friesen Racing would set the fastest time with a 23.107 and an average speed of 155.797 miles per hour (250.731 km/h).

| Pos. | # | Driver | Team | Make | Time | Speed |
|---|---|---|---|---|---|---|
| 1 | 52 | Stewart Friesen | Halmar Friesen Racing | Chevrolet | 23.107 | 155.797 |
| 2 | 21 | Johnny Sauter | GMS Racing | Chevrolet | 23.467 | 155.407 |
| 3 | 13 | Myatt Snider | ThorSport Racing | Ford | 23.482 | 155.309 |
Full first practice results

=== Second and final practice ===
Final practice was held on 4:05 PM EST. Brett Moffitt of Hattori Racing Enterprises would set the fastest time in practice with a 22.773 and an average speed of 158.082 miles per hour (254.408 km/h).

| Pos. | # | Driver | Team | Make | Time | Speed |
|---|---|---|---|---|---|---|
| 1 | 16 | Brett Moffitt | Hattori Racing Enterprises | Toyota | 22.773 | 158.082 |
| 2 | 18 | Noah Gragson | Kyle Busch Motorsports | Toyota | 22.964 | 156.767 |
| 3 | 21 | Johnny Sauter | GMS Racing | Chevrolet | 23.173 | 155.353 |
Full second practice results

== Qualifying ==
Qualifying was held on Friday, May 4, at 1:05 PM EST. Since Dover International Speedway is under 1.5 miles (2.4 km), the qualifying system was a multi-car system that included three rounds. The first round was 15 minutes, where every driver would be able to set a lap within the 15 minutes. Then, the second round would consist of the fastest 24 cars in Round 1, and drivers would have 10 minutes to set a lap. Round 3 consisted of the fastest 12 drivers from Round 2, and the drivers would have 5 minutes to set a time. Whoever was fastest in Round 3 would win the pole.

Noah Gragson of Kyle Busch Motorsports would set the fastest time in Round 3 and win the pole with a 22.834 and an average speed of 157.660 miles per hour (253.729 km/h).

Todd Peck of Beaver Motorsports would be the only driver not to set a lap time, due to the team wanting to have the entry to be a "start and park". He would eventually park and retire the car very early in the race, after the team realizing that the #74 of Harmon would stay out, saying to Peck "Alright [Todd], we appreciate you bud, take it back to the hauler.” He would finish last out of a 32 car field.

| Pos. | # | Driver | Team | Make | Time (R1) | Speed (R1) | Time (R2) | Speed (R2) | Time (R3) | Speed (R3) |
|---|---|---|---|---|---|---|---|---|---|---|
| 1 | 18 | Noah Gragson | Kyle Busch Motorsports | Toyota | | | | | 22.834 | 157.660 |
| 2 | 21 | Johnny Sauter | GMS Racing | Chevrolet | | | | | 22.942 | 156.917 |
| 3 | 4 | Todd Gilliland | Kyle Busch Motorsports | Toyota | | | | | 23.006 | 156.481 |
| 4 | 24 | Justin Haley | GMS Racing | Chevrolet | | | | | 23.015 | 156.420 |
| 5 | 97 | Jesse Little | JJL Motorsports | Ford | | | | | 23.015 | 156.420 |
| 6 | 75 | Parker Kligerman | Henderson Motorsports | Chevrolet | | | | | 23.032 | 156.304 |
| 7 | 52 | Stewart Friesen | Halmar Friesen Racing | Chevrolet | | | | | 23.040 | 156.250 |
| 8 | 41 | Ben Rhodes | ThorSport Racing | Ford | | | | | 23.104 | 155.817 |
| 9 | 54 | David Gilliland | DGR-Crosley | Toyota | | | | | 23.110 | 155.777 |
| 10 | 88 | Matt Crafton | ThorSport Racing | Ford | | | | | 23.162 | 155.427 |
| 11 | 25 | Dalton Sargeant | GMS Racing | Chevrolet | | | | | 23.182 | 155.293 |
| 12 | 16 | Brett Moffitt | Hattori Racing Enterprises | Toyota | | | | | 23.210 | 155.106 |
Eliminated in Round 2
| 13 | 98 | Grant Enfinger | ThorSport Racing | Ford | | | 23.132 | 155.629 | — | — |
| 14 | 02 | Austin Hill | Young's Motorsports | Chevrolet | | | 23.150 | 155.508 | — | — |
| 15 | 13 | Myatt Snider | ThorSport Racing | Ford | | | 23.268 | 154.719 | — | — |
| 16 | 8 | Joe Nemechek | NEMCO Motorsports | Chevrolet | | | 23.274 | 154.679 | — | — |
| 17 | 51 | Harrison Burton | Kyle Busch Motorsports | Toyota | | | 23.288 | 154.586 | — | — |
| 18 | 2 | Cody Coughlin | GMS Racing | Chevrolet | | | 23.375 | 154.011 | — | — |
| 19 | 3 | Jordan Anderson | Jordan Anderson Racing | Chevrolet | | | 23.416 | 153.741 | — | — |
| 20 | 20 | Tanner Thorson | Young's Motorsports | Chevrolet | | | 23.550 | 152.866 | — | — |
| 21 | 22 | Austin Wayne Self | Niece Motorsports | Chevrolet | | | 23.665 | 152.123 | — | — |
| 22 | 45 | Justin Fontaine | Niece Motorsports | Chevrolet | | | 23.708 | 151.847 | — | — |
| 23 | 7 | Korbin Forrister | All Out Motorsports | Toyota | | | 23.902 | 150.615 | — | — |
| 24 | 49 | Wendell Chavous | Premium Motorsports | Chevrolet | | | 24.074 | 149.539 | — | — |
Eliminated in Round 1
| 25 | 83 | Bayley Currey | Copp Motorsports | Chevrolet | 24.228 | 148.588 | — | — | — | — |
| 26 | 15 | Reed Sorenson | Premium Motorsports | Chevrolet | 24.319 | 148.032 | — | — | — | — |
| 27 | 33 | Josh Reaume | Reaume Brothers Racing | Toyota | 24.369 | 147.729 | — | — | — | — |
Qualified by owner's points
| 28 | 74 | Mike Harmon | Mike Harmon Racing | Chevrolet | 24.916 | 144.485 | — | — | — | — |
| 29 | 63 | Camden Murphy | Copp Motorsports | Chevrolet | 24.936 | 144.370 | — | — | — | — |
| 30 | 10 | Jennifer Jo Cobb | Jennifer Jo Cobb Racing | Chevrolet | 25.388 | 141.799 | — | — | — | — |
| 31 | 6 | Norm Benning | Norm Benning Racing | Chevrolet | 25.501 | 141.171 | — | — | — | — |
| 32 | 50 | Todd Peck | Beaver Motorsports | Chevrolet | — | — | — | — | — | — |
| Withdrew | | | | | | | | | | |
| WD | 0 | Joey Gase | Jennifer Jo Cobb Racing | Chevrolet | — | — | — | — | — | — |
| WD | 1 | Ray Ciccarelli | TJL Motorsports | Chevrolet | — | — | — | — | — | — |
Official starting lineup

== Race results ==
Stage 1 Laps: 45

| Pos. | # | Driver | Team | Make | Pts |
|---|---|---|---|---|---|
| 1 | 18 | Noah Gragson | Kyle Busch Motorsports | Toyota | 10 |
| 2 | 4 | Todd Gilliland | Kyle Busch Motorsports | Toyota | 9 |
| 3 | 24 | Justin Haley | GMS Racing | Chevrolet | 8 |
| 4 | 21 | Johnny Sauter | GMS Racing | Chevrolet | 7 |
| 5 | 97 | Jesse Little | JJL Motorsports | Ford | 6 |
| 6 | 41 | Ben Rhodes | ThorSport Racing | Ford | 5 |
| 7 | 88 | Matt Crafton | ThorSport Racing | Ford | 4 |
| 8 | 54 | David Gilliland | DGR-Crosley | Toyota | 3 |
| 9 | 8 | Joe Nemechek | NEMCO Motorsports | Chevrolet | 2 |
| 10 | 52 | Stewart Friesen | Halmar Friesen Racing | Chevrolet | 1 |

Stage 2 Laps: 45

| Pos. | # | Driver | Team | Make | Pts |
|---|---|---|---|---|---|
| 1 | 21 | Johnny Sauter | GMS Racing | Chevrolet | 10 |
| 2 | 24 | Justin Haley | GMS Racing | Chevrolet | 9 |
| 3 | 88 | Matt Crafton | ThorSport Racing | Ford | 8 |
| 4 | 18 | Noah Gragson | Kyle Busch Motorsports | Toyota | 7 |
| 5 | 97 | Jesse Little | JJL Motorsports | Ford | 6 |
| 6 | 41 | Ben Rhodes | ThorSport Racing | Ford | 5 |
| 7 | 51 | Harrison Burton | Kyle Busch Motorsports | Toyota | 4 |
| 8 | 4 | Todd Gilliland | Kyle Busch Motorsports | Toyota | 3 |
| 9 | 54 | David Gilliland | DGR-Crosley | Toyota | 2 |
| 10 | 13 | Myatt Snider | ThorSport Racing | Ford | 1 |

Stage 3 Laps: 120

| Fin | St | # | Driver | Team | Make | Laps | Led | Status | Pts |
|---|---|---|---|---|---|---|---|---|---|
| 1 | 2 | 21 | Johnny Sauter | GMS Racing | Chevrolet | 210 | 137 | running | 57 |
| 2 | 10 | 88 | Matt Crafton | ThorSport Racing | Ford | 210 | 0 | running | 47 |
| 3 | 4 | 24 | Justin Haley | GMS Racing | Chevrolet | 210 | 0 | running | 51 |
| 4 | 9 | 54 | David Gilliland | DGR-Crosley | Toyota | 210 | 0 | running | 38 |
| 5 | 17 | 51 | Harrison Burton | Kyle Busch Motorsports | Toyota | 210 | 0 | running | 36 |
| 6 | 18 | 2 | Cody Coughlin | GMS Racing | Chevrolet | 210 | 0 | running | 31 |
| 7 | 16 | 8 | Joe Nemechek | NEMCO Motorsports | Chevrolet | 210 | 0 | running | 32 |
| 8 | 8 | 41 | Ben Rhodes | ThorSport Racing | Ford | 210 | 0 | running | 39 |
| 9 | 5 | 97 | Jesse Little | JJL Motorsports | Ford | 210 | 2 | running | 40 |
| 10 | 3 | 4 | Todd Gilliland | Kyle Busch Motorsports | Toyota | 209 | 0 | running | 39 |
| 11 | 15 | 13 | Myatt Snider | ThorSport Racing | Ford | 209 | 0 | running | 27 |
| 12 | 12 | 16 | Brett Moffitt | Hattori Racing Enterprises | Toyota | 209 | 0 | running | 25 |
| 13 | 11 | 25 | Dalton Sargeant | GMS Racing | Chevrolet | 209 | 0 | running | 24 |
| 14 | 13 | 98 | Grant Enfinger | ThorSport Racing | Ford | 208 | 0 | running | 23 |
| 15 | 21 | 22 | Austin Wayne Self | Niece Motorsports | Chevrolet | 208 | 0 | running | 22 |
| 16 | 20 | 20 | Tanner Thorson | Young's Motorsports | Chevrolet | 207 | 0 | running | 21 |
| 17 | 24 | 49 | Wendell Chavous | Premium Motorsports | Chevrolet | 206 | 0 | running | 20 |
| 18 | 19 | 3 | Jordan Anderson | Jordan Anderson Racing | Chevrolet | 206 | 0 | running | 19 |
| 19 | 22 | 45 | Justin Fontaine | Niece Motorsports | Chevrolet | 204 | 0 | running | 18 |
| 20 | 1 | 18 | Noah Gragson | Kyle Busch Motorsports | Toyota | 198 | 60 | crash | 34 |
| 21 | 23 | 7 | Korbin Forrister | All Out Motorsports | Toyota | 197 | 0 | running | 16 |
| 22 | 30 | 10 | Jennifer Jo Cobb | Jennifer Jo Cobb Racing | Chevrolet | 194 | 0 | running | 15 |
| 23 | 7 | 52 | Stewart Friesen | Halmar Friesen Racing | Chevrolet | 153 | 0 | crash | 15 |
| 24 | 28 | 74 | Mike Harmon | Mike Harmon Racing | Chevrolet | 129 | 0 | suspension | 0 |
| 25 | 27 | 33 | Josh Reaume | Reaume Brothers Racing | Toyota | 124 | 0 | parked | 12 |
| 26 | 25 | 83 | Bayley Currey | Copp Motorsports | Chevrolet | 122 | 0 | suspension | 11 |
| 27 | 31 | 6 | Norm Benning | Norm Benning Racing | Chevrolet | 120 | 0 | parked | 10 |
| 28 | 6 | 75 | Parker Kligerman | Henderson Motorsports | Chevrolet | 86 | 11 | oil cooler | 9 |
| 29 | 29 | 63 | Camden Murphy | Copp Motorsports | Chevrolet | 58 | 0 | vibration | 8 |
| 30 | 26 | 15 | Reed Sorenson | Premium Motorsports | Chevrolet | 15 | 0 | vibration | 0 |
| 31 | 14 | 02 | Austin Hill | Young's Motorsports | Chevrolet | 13 | 0 | crash | 6 |
| 32 | 32 | 50 | Todd Peck | Beaver Motorsports | Chevrolet | 7 | 0 | rear end | 5 |
Withdrew
| WD | | 0 | Joey Gase | Jennifer Jo Cobb Racing | Chevrolet | | | | |
| WD | | 1 | Ray Ciccarelli | TJL Motorsports | Chevrolet | | | | |
Official race results

| Previous race: 2018 Alpha Energy Solutions 250 | NASCAR Camping World Truck Series; 2018 season | Next race: 2018 37 Kind Days 250 |
