= 2018 World of Westgate 200 =

Race details
- Race 18 of 23 of the 2018 NASCAR Camping World Truck Series
- Date: September 14, 2018
- Official name: World of Westgate 200
- Location: North Las Vegas, Nevada, Las Vegas Motor Speedway
- Course: Permanent racing facility
- Course length: 1.5 miles (2.41 km)
- Distance: 144 laps, 216 mi (347.618 km)
- Scheduled distance: 134 laps, 201 mi (323.477 km)
- Average speed: 101.647 miles per hour (163.585 km/h)

Pole position
| Driver | Noah Gragson | Kyle Busch Motorsports |
- Time: 30.331

Most laps led
| Driver | Grant Enfinger | ThorSport Racing |
- Laps: 40

Winner
| No. 98 | Grant Enfinger | ThorSport Racing |

Television in the United States
- Network: Fox Sports 1
- Announcers: Vince Welch, Phil Parsons, Michael Waltrip

Radio in the United States
- Radio: Motor Racing Network

The 2018 World of Westgate 200 was the 18th stock car race of the 2018 NASCAR Camping World Truck Series season, the second race of the Round of 8, and the inaugural running of the event. Despite an agreement, Speedway Motorsports would cancel one New Hampshire Motor Speedway weekend and add one race of each national series to Las Vegas Motor Speedway. The race was held on Friday, September 14, 2018 in North Las Vegas, Nevada at Las Vegas Motor Speedway, a 1.5 miles (2.4 km) permanent D-shaped oval racetrack. The race was extended from its scheduled 134 laps to 144 laps due to numerous NASCAR overtime attempts. At race's end, Grant Enfinger would pull away from an ailing Brett Moffitt on the restart and pull away to win his 2nd career NASCAR Camping World Truck Series race and the first and only win of the season. To fill out then podium, Johnny Sauter and Justin Haley, both driving for GMS Racing would finish second and third, respectively.

== Background ==
The layout of Las Vegas Motor Speedway, the venue where the race was held.

Las Vegas Motor Speedway, located in Clark County, Nevada outside the Las Vegas city limits and about 15 miles northeast of the Las Vegas Strip, is a 1,200-acre (490 ha) complex of multiple tracks for motorsports racing. The complex is owned by Speedway Motorsports, Inc., which is headquartered in Charlotte, North Carolina.

=== Entry list ===
| # | Driver | Team | Make | Sponsor |
|---|---|---|---|---|
| 0 | Camden Murphy* | Jennifer Jo Cobb Racing | Chevrolet | Driven2Honor.org |
| 2 | Cody Coughlin | GMS Racing | Chevrolet | God Bless the Broken Road |
| 02 | Austin Hill | Young's Motorsports | Chevrolet | Randco, Young's Building Systems |
| 3 | Jordan Anderson | Jordan Anderson Racing | Chevrolet | Commercial Property Services |
| 4 | Todd Gilliland | Kyle Busch Motorsports | Toyota | SiriusXM, JBL |
| 04 | Cory Roper | Roper Racing | Ford | Preferred Industrial Contractors, Inc. |
| 6 | Norm Benning | Norm Benning Racing | Chevrolet | H & H Transport |
| 7 | Korbin Forrister | All Out Motorsports | Toyota | Tru Clear Global |
| 8 | John Hunter Nemechek | NEMCO Motorsports | Chevrolet | Berry's Manufacturing |
| 10 | Jennifer Jo Cobb | Jennifer Jo Cobb Racing | Chevrolet | Driven2Honor.org |
| 12 | Tate Fogleman | Young's Motorsports | Chevrolet | Solid Rock Carriers |
| 13 | Myatt Snider | ThorSport Racing | Ford | Century Container |
| 15 | Ross Chastain | Premium Motorsports | Chevrolet | Premium Motorsports |
| 16 | Brett Moffitt | Hattori Racing Enterprises | Toyota | Osaka Toyota |
| 17 | Bo LeMastus | DGR-Crosley | Toyota | Crosley Brands |
| 18 | Noah Gragson | Kyle Busch Motorsports | Toyota | Safelite Auto Glass |
| 20 | Tanner Thorson | Young's Motorsports | Chevrolet | GoShare |
| 21 | Johnny Sauter | GMS Racing | Chevrolet | Allegiant Air |
| 22 | Austin Wayne Self | Niece Motorsports | Chevrolet | AM Technical Solutions, GO TEXAN. "Don't mess with Texas" |
| 24 | Justin Haley | GMS Racing | Chevrolet | Fraternal Order of Eagles |
| 25 | Timothy Peters | GMS Racing | Chevrolet | Kingman Chevrolet |
| 30 | Austin Theriault | On Point Motorsports | Toyota | Cross Insurance |
| 33 | J. J. Yeley | Reaume Brothers Racing | Toyota | Reaume Brothers Racing |
| 38 | T. J. Bell | Niece Motorsports | Chevrolet | Niece Motorsports |
| 41 | Ben Rhodes | ThorSport Racing | Ford | The Carolina Nut Company |
| 45 | Justin Fontaine | Niece Motorsports | Chevrolet | ProMatic Automation |
| 46 | Riley Herbst | Kyle Busch Motorsports | Toyota | Advance Auto Parts |
| 49 | Wendell Chavous | Premium Motorsports | Chevrolet | SobrietyNation.org |
| 50 | Travis Kvapil* | Beaver Motorsports | Chevrolet | VIPRacingExperience.com |
| 51 | Brandon Jones | Kyle Busch Motorsports | Toyota | Delta Faucet |
| 52 | Stewart Friesen | Halmar Friesen Racing | Chevrolet | Halmar "We Build America" |
| 54 | Chris Eggleston | DGR-Crosley | Toyota | H2O Fire Protection, Inc. |
| 74 | Mike Harmon* | Mike Harmon Racing | Chevrolet | |
| 83 | Bayley Currey | Copp Motorsports | Chevrolet | American Club Pipe Tobacco |
| 87 | Joe Nemechek | NEMCO Motorsports | Chevrolet | D. A. B. Constructors, Inc. |
| 88 | Matt Crafton | ThorSport Racing | Ford | Menards, Ideal Door Garage Doors |
| 97 | Jesse Little | JJL Motorsports | Ford | JJL Motorsports |
| 98 | Grant Enfinger | ThorSport Racing | Ford | Champion Power Equipment "Powering Your Life." |
Official entry list

*Withdrew.

== Practice ==
=== First practice ===
First practice was held on Thursday, September 13 at 2:05 PST. Johnny Sauter of GMS Racing would set the fastest lap in practice with a time with a 30.731 and an average speed of 175.718 miles per hour (282.791 km/h).

| Pos. | # | Driver | Team | Make | Time | Speed |
|---|---|---|---|---|---|---|
| 1 | 21 | Johnny Sauter | GMS Racing | Chevrolet | 30.731 | 175.718 |
| 2 | 13 | Myatt Snider | ThorSport Racing | Ford | 30.802 | 175.131 |
| 3 | 52 | Stewart Friesen | Halmar Friesen Racing | Chevrolet | 30.826 | 175.177 |
Full first practice results

=== Second and final practice ===
The second and final practice would take place on Thursday, September 13 at 4:05 PST. Riley Herbst of Kyle Busch Motorsports would set the fastest lap in practice with a time of 30.589 and an average speed of 176.534 miles per hour (284.104 km/h).

| Pos. | # | Driver | Team | Make | Time | Speed |
|---|---|---|---|---|---|---|
| 1 | 46 | Riley Herbst | Kyle Busch Motorsports | Toyota | 30.589 | 176.534 |
| 2 | 24 | Justin Haley | GMS Racing | Chevrolet | 30.661 | 176.074 |
| 3 | 88 | Matt Crafton | ThorSport Racing | Ford | 30.681 | 176.005 |
Full final practice results

== Qualifying ==
Qualifying would take place on Friday, September 14 at 3:05 PST. Since Las Vegas Motor Speedway is at least 1.5 miles (2.4 km), the qualifying system was a single car, single lap, two round system where in the first round, everyone would set a time to determine positions 13-32. Then, the fastest 12 qualifiers would move on to the second round to determine positions 1-12.

Noah Gragson would proceed to set the fastest time in both rounds, achieving a lap in the second round of a 30.331 and an average speed of 178.036 miles per hour (286.521 km/h). Three drivers would fail to qualify: Tate Fogleman, J. J. Yeley, and Norm Benning.

=== Full qualifying results ===
| Pos. | # | Driver | Team | Make | Time (R1) | Speed (R1) | Time (R2) | Speed (R2) |
|---|---|---|---|---|---|---|---|---|
| 1 | 18 | Noah Gragson | Kyle Busch Motorsports | Toyota | 30.386 | 177.713 | 30.331 | 178.036 |
| 2 | 52 | Stewart Friesen | Halmar Friesen Racing | Chevrolet | 30.547 | 176.777 | 30.541 | 176.811 |
| 3 | 98 | Grant Enfinger | ThorSport Racing | Ford | 30.738 | 175.678 | 30.588 | 176.540 |
| 4 | 54 | Chris Eggleston | DGR-Crosley | Toyota | 30.623 | 176.338 | 30.640 | 176.240 |
| 5 | 46 | Riley Herbst | Kyle Busch Motorsports | Toyota | 30.726 | 175.747 | 30.672 | 176.056 |
| 6 | 21 | Johnny Sauter | GMS Racing | Chevrolet | 30.736 | 175.690 | 30.684 | 175.987 |
| 7 | 51 | Brandon Jones | Kyle Busch Motorsports | Toyota | 30.578 | 176.598 | 30.711 | 175.833 |
| 8 | 8 | John Hunter Nemechek | NEMCO Motorsports | Chevrolet | 30.628 | 176.309 | 30.714 | 175.816 |
| 9 | 16 | Brett Moffitt | Hattori Racing Enterprises | Toyota | 30.803 | 175.308 | 30.783 | 175.421 |
| 10 | 4 | Todd Gilliland | Kyle Busch Motorsports | Toyota | 30.715 | 175.810 | 30.797 | 175.342 |
| 11 | 20 | Tanner Thorson | Young's Motorsports | Chevrolet | 30.853 | 175.023 | 30.869 | 174.933 |
| 12 | 24 | Justin Haley | GMS Racing | Chevrolet | 30.904 | 174.735 | 30.937 | 174.548 |
Eliminated in Round 1
| 13 | 13 | Myatt Snider | ThorSport Racing | Ford | 30.906 | 174.723 | — | — |
| 14 | 25 | Timothy Peters | GMS Racing | Chevrolet | 30.907 | 174.718 | — | — |
| 15 | 2 | Cody Coughlin | GMS Racing | Chevrolet | 30.986 | 174.272 | — | — |
| 16 | 02 | Austin Hill | Young's Motorsports | Chevrolet | 31.022 | 174.070 | — | — |
| 17 | 17 | Bo LeMastus | DGR-Crosley | Toyota | 31.022 | 174.070 | — | — |
| 18 | 41 | Ben Rhodes | ThorSport Racing | Ford | 31.042 | 173.958 | — | — |
| 19 | 04 | Cory Roper | Roper Racing | Ford | 31.042 | 173.958 | — | — |
| 20 | 7 | Korbin Forrister | All Out Motorsports | Toyota | 31.069 | 173.807 | — | — |
| 21 | 30 | Austin Theriault | On Point Motorsports | Toyota | 31.084 | 173.723 | — | — |
| 22 | 87 | Joe Nemechek | NEMCO Motorsports | Chevrolet | 31.106 | 173.600 | — | — |
| 23 | 38 | T. J. Bell | Niece Motorsports | Chevrolet | 31.146 | 173.377 | — | — |
| 24 | 15 | Ross Chastain | Premium Motorsports | Chevrolet | 31.157 | 173.316 | — | — |
| 25 | 22 | Austin Wayne Self | Niece Motorsports | Chevrolet | 31.207 | 173.038 | — | — |
| 26 | 97 | Jesse Little | JJL Motorsports | Ford | 31.209 | 173.027 | — | — |
| 27 | 10 | Jennifer Jo Cobb | Jennifer Jo Cobb Racing | Chevrolet | 31.318 | 172.425 | — | — |
Qualified on owner's points
| 28 | 83 | Bayley Currey | Copp Motorsports | Chevrolet | 31.391 | 172.024 | — | — |
| 29 | 88 | Matt Crafton | ThorSport Racing | Ford | 31.500 | 171.429 | — | — |
| 30 | 45 | Justin Fontaine | Niece Motorsports | Chevrolet | 31.500 | 171.429 | — | — |
| 31 | 49 | Wendell Chavous | Premium Motorsports | Chevrolet | 31.921 | 169.168 | — | — |
| 32 | 3 | Jordan Anderson | Jordan Anderson Racing | Chevrolet | 32.810 | 164.584 | — | — |
Failed to qualify or withdrew
| 33 | 12 | Tate Fogleman | Young's Motorsports | Chevrolet | 31.354 | 172.227 | — | — |
| 34 | 33 | J. J. Yeley | Reaume Brothers Racing | Toyota | 31.724 | 170.218 | — | — |
| 35 | 6 | Norm Benning | Norm Benning Racing | Chevrolet | 34.627 | 155.948 | — | — |
| WD | 0 | Camden Murphy | Jennifer Jo Cobb Racing | Chevrolet | — | — | — | — |
| WD | 50 | Travis Kvapil | Beaver Motorsports | Chevrolet | — | — | — | — |
| WD | 74 | Mike Harmon | Mike Harmon Racing | Chevrolet | — | — | — | — |
Official qualifying results

== Race results ==
Stage 1 Laps: 30

| Fin | # | Driver | Team | Make | Pts |
|---|---|---|---|---|---|
| 1 | 18 | Noah Gragson | Kyle Busch Motorsports | Toyota | 10 |
| 2 | 8 | John Hunter Nemechek | NEMCO Motorsports | Chevrolet | 0 |
| 3 | 52 | Stewart Friesen | Halmar Friesen Racing | Chevrolet | 8 |
| 4 | 4 | Todd Gilliland | Kyle Busch Motorsports | Toyota | 7 |
| 5 | 51 | Brandon Jones | Kyle Busch Motorsports | Toyota | 0 |
| 6 | 21 | Johnny Sauter | GMS Racing | Chevrolet | 5 |
| 7 | 98 | Grant Enfinger | ThorSport Racing | Ford | 4 |
| 8 | 88 | Matt Crafton | ThorSport Racing | Ford | 3 |
| 9 | 24 | Justin Haley | GMS Racing | Chevrolet | 2 |
| 10 | 41 | Ben Rhodes | ThorSport Racing | Ford | 1 |

Stage 2 Laps: 30

| Fin | # | Driver | Team | Make | Pts |
|---|---|---|---|---|---|
| 1 | 98 | Grant Enfinger | ThorSport Racing | Ford | 10 |
| 2 | 88 | Matt Crafton | ThorSport Racing | Ford | 9 |
| 3 | 18 | Noah Gragson | Kyle Busch Motorsports | Toyota | 8 |
| 4 | 8 | John Hunter Nemechek | NEMCO Motorsports | Chevrolet | 0 |
| 5 | 52 | Stewart Friesen | Halmar Friesen Racing | Chevrolet | 6 |
| 6 | 97 | Jesse Little | JJL Motorsports | Ford | 5 |
| 7 | 41 | Ben Rhodes | ThorSport Racing | Ford | 4 |
| 8 | 21 | Johnny Sauter | GMS Racing | Chevrolet | 3 |
| 9 | 51 | Brandon Jones | Kyle Busch Motorsports | Toyota | 0 |
| 10 | 16 | Brett Moffitt | Hattori Racing Enterprises | Toyota | 1 |

Stage 3 Laps: 84

| Fin | St | # | Driver | Team | Make | Laps | Led | Status | Pts |
|---|---|---|---|---|---|---|---|---|---|
| 1 | 3 | 98 | Grant Enfinger | ThorSport Racing | Ford | 144 | 40 | running | 54 |
| 2 | 6 | 21 | Johnny Sauter | GMS Racing | Chevrolet | 144 | 21 | running | 43 |
| 3 | 12 | 24 | Justin Haley | GMS Racing | Chevrolet | 144 | 0 | running | 36 |
| 4 | 18 | 41 | Ben Rhodes | ThorSport Racing | Ford | 144 | 4 | running | 38 |
| 5 | 29 | 88 | Matt Crafton | ThorSport Racing | Ford | 144 | 4 | running | 44 |
| 6 | 13 | 13 | Myatt Snider | ThorSport Racing | Ford | 144 | 0 | running | 31 |
| 7 | 24 | 15 | Ross Chastain | Premium Motorsports | Chevrolet | 144 | 0 | running | 0 |
| 8 | 21 | 30 | Austin Theriault | On Point Motorsports | Toyota | 144 | 0 | running | 29 |
| 9 | 25 | 22 | Austin Wayne Self | Niece Motorsports | Chevrolet | 144 | 0 | running | 28 |
| 10 | 4 | 54 | Chris Eggleston | DGR-Crosley | Toyota | 144 | 0 | running | 27 |
| 11 | 9 | 16 | Brett Moffitt | Hattori Racing Enterprises | Toyota | 144 | 18 | running | 27 |
| 12 | 27 | 10 | Jennifer Jo Cobb | Jennifer Jo Cobb Racing | Chevrolet | 144 | 0 | running | 25 |
| 13 | 20 | 7 | Korbin Forrister | All Out Motorsports | Toyota | 144 | 0 | running | 24 |
| 14 | 30 | 45 | Justin Fontaine | Niece Motorsports | Chevrolet | 144 | 0 | running | 23 |
| 15 | 26 | 97 | Jesse Little | JJL Motorsports | Ford | 144 | 0 | running | 27 |
| 16 | 28 | 83 | Bayley Currey | Copp Motorsports | Chevrolet | 144 | 0 | running | 21 |
| 17 | 2 | 52 | Stewart Friesen | Halmar Friesen Racing | Chevrolet | 144 | 17 | running | 34 |
| 18 | 1 | 18 | Noah Gragson | Kyle Busch Motorsports | Toyota | 143 | 33 | running | 37 |
| 19 | 14 | 25 | Timothy Peters | GMS Racing | Chevrolet | 143 | 0 | running | 18 |
| 20 | 32 | 3 | Jordan Anderson | Jordan Anderson Racing | Chevrolet | 143 | 2 | running | 17 |
| 21 | 23 | 38 | T. J. Bell | Niece Motorsports | Chevrolet | 138 | 0 | accident | 16 |
| 22 | 8 | 8 | John Hunter Nemechek | NEMCO Motorsports | Chevrolet | 138 | 0 | accident | 0 |
| 23 | 16 | 02 | Austin Hill | Young's Motorsports | Chevrolet | 138 | 0 | accident | 14 |
| 24 | 15 | 2 | Cody Coughlin | GMS Racing | Chevrolet | 134 | 0 | accident | 13 |
| 25 | 19 | 04 | Cory Roper | Roper Racing | Ford | 120 | 0 | accident | 12 |
| 26 | 7 | 51 | Brandon Jones | Kyle Busch Motorsports | Toyota | 119 | 0 | accident | 0 |
| 27 | 10 | 4 | Todd Gilliland | Kyle Busch Motorsports | Toyota | 86 | 5 | accident | 17 |
| 28 | 31 | 49 | Wendell Chavous | Premium Motorsports | Chevrolet | 86 | 0 | accident | 9 |
| 29 | 5 | 46 | Riley Herbst | Kyle Busch Motorsports | Toyota | 56 | 0 | accident | 8 |
| 30 | 17 | 17 | Bo LeMastus | DGR-Crosley | Toyota | 45 | 0 | accident | 7 |
| 31 | 22 | 87 | Joe Nemechek | NEMCO Motorsports | Chevrolet | 27 | 0 | vibration | 6 |
| 32 | 11 | 20 | Tanner Thorson | Young's Motorsports | Chevrolet | 2 | 0 | accident | 5 |
Failed to qualify or withdrew
| 33 | | 12 | Tate Fogleman | Young's Motorsports | Chevrolet | | | | |
| 34 | | 33 | J. J. Yeley | Reaume Brothers Racing | Toyota | | | | |
| 35 | | 6 | Norm Benning | Norm Benning Racing | Chevrolet | | | | |
| WD | | 0 | Camden Murphy | Jennifer Jo Cobb Racing | Chevrolet | | | | |
| WD | | 50 | Travis Kvapil | Beaver Motorsports | Chevrolet | | | | |
| WD | | 74 | Mike Harmon | Mike Harmon Racing | Chevrolet | | | | |
Official race results

| Previous race: 2018 Chevrolet Silverado 250 | NASCAR Camping World Truck Series; 2018 season | Next race: 2018 Fr8Auctions 250 |
