= 2018 Active Pest Control 200 =

2018 Active Pest Control 200 Benefitting Children's Healthcare of Atlanta
Race details
- Race 2 of 23 of the 2018 NASCAR Camping World Truck Series
- Date: February 24, 2018
- Official name: Active Pest Control 200 Benefitting Children's Healthcare of Atlanta
- Location: Hampton, Georgia, Atlanta Motor Speedway
- Course: Permanent racing facility
- Course length: 1.54 miles (2.48 km)
- Distance: 134 laps, 206.36 mi (332.104 km)
- Scheduled distance: 130 laps, 200.200 mi (322.19 km)
- Average speed: 123.816 miles per hour (199.263 km/h)

Pole position
Driver	Kyle Busch	Kyle Busch Motorsports
- Time: 30.844

Most laps led
Driver	Kyle Busch	Kyle Busch Motorsports
- Laps: 67

Winner
No. 16	Austin Hill	Hattori Racing Enterprises

Television in the United States
- Network: Fox Sports 1
- Announcers: Vince Welch, Phil Parsons, Michael Waltrip

Radio in the United States
- Radio: Motor Racing Network

The 2018 Active Pest Control 200 was the second stock car race of the 2018 NASCAR Camping World Truck Series season and the 13th iteration of the event. The race was held on Saturday, February 24, 2018 in Hampton, Georgia at Atlanta Motor Speedway, a 1.54 miles (2.48 km) permanent quad-oval racetrack. The race was extended from 130 laps from 134 due to a NASCAR overtime finish caused by a crash including Josh Reaume. After a costly mistake by Kyle Busch's pit crew before the final restart, Brett Moffitt of Hattori Racing Enterprises would steal and win the race- the first of the season and the 2nd of his career. To complete the podium, Noah Gragson of Kyle Busch Motorsports and Johnny Sauter of GMS Racing would finish 2nd and 3rd, respectively.

== Background ==
The layout of Atlanta Motor Speedway, the venue where the race was held.

Atlanta Motor Speedway (formerly Atlanta International Raceway) is a track in Hampton, Georgia, 20 miles (32 km) south of Atlanta. It is a 1.54-mile (2.48 km) quad-oval track with a seating capacity of 111,000. It opened in 1960 as a 1.5-mile (2.4 km) standard oval. In 1994, 46 condominiums were built over the northeastern side of the track. In 1997, to standardize the track with Speedway Motorsports' other two 1.5-mile (2.4 km) ovals, the entire track was almost completely rebuilt. The frontstretch and backstretch were swapped, and the configuration of the track was changed from oval to quad-oval. The project made the track one of the fastest on the NASCAR circuit.

#	Driver	Team	Make	Sponsor
0	Joey Gase	Jennifer Jo Cobb Racing	Chevrolet	Driven2Honor.org
1	Clay Greenfield	TJL Motorsports	Chevrolet	Motorsports Safety Group
2	Cody Coughlin	GMS Racing	Chevrolet	Jegs
02	Austin Hill	Young's Motorsports	Chevrolet	United Rentals
3	Jordan Anderson	Jordan Anderson Racing	Toyota	Bommarito Automotive Group, Lucas Oil
4	Kyle Busch	Kyle Busch Motorsports	Toyota	Cessna, Beechcraft
6	Norm Benning	Norm Benning	Chevrolet	Zomongo
7	Korbin Forrister	All Out Motorsports	Toyota	Tru Clear Global
8	Joe Nemechek	NEMCO Motorsports	Chevrolet	Fleetwing Oil, D. A. B. Constructors Inc.
10	Jennifer Jo Cobb	Jennifer Jo Cobb Racing	Chevrolet	Driven2Honor.org, ThinkRealty.com
13	Myatt Snider	ThorSport Racing	Ford	Liberty Tax "You Do Life, We Do Taxes"
15	Robby Lyons	Premium Motorsports	Chevrolet	Troptions
16	Brett Moffitt	Hattori Racing Enterprises	Toyota	Aisin
18	Noah Gragson	Kyle Busch Motorsports	Toyota	Safelite Auto Glass
20	Austin Dillon	Young's Motorsports	Chevrolet	GoShare
21	Johnny Sauter	GMS Racing	Chevrolet	Allegiant Air
22	Austin Wayne Self	Niece Motorsports	Chevrolet	AM Technical Solutions, GO TEXAN. "Don't mess with Texas"
24	Justin Haley	GMS Racing	Chevrolet	Fraternal Order of Eagles
25	Dalton Sargeant	GMS Racing	Chevrolet	Performance Plus Motor Oil
33	Josh Reaume	Reaume Brothers Racing	Chevrolet	Green Heart Partners, R-Coin
41	Ben Rhodes	ThorSport Racing	Ford	Alpha Energy Solutions
45	Justin Fontaine	Niece Motorsports	Chevrolet	Superior Essex
49	Wendell Chavous	Premium Motorsports	Chevrolet	SobrietyNation.org
50	Travis Kvapil	Beaver Motorsports	Chevrolet	Motorsports Safety Group
51	Spencer Davis	Kyle Busch Motorsports	Toyota	Rheem
52	Stewart Friesen	Halmar Friesen Racing	Chevrolet	Halmar "We Build America"
54	Bo LeMastus	DGR-Crosley	Toyota	Crosley Brands
63	Akinori Ogata	MB Motorsports	Chevrolet	Nisshinbo Holdings
74	Tim Viens	Mike Harmon Racing	Chevrolet	Atlanta Havoc
75	Parker Kligerman	Henderson Motorsports	Chevrolet	Food Country USA, Tide Pods
83	Scott Stenzel	Copp Motorsports	Chevrolet	Fr8Auctions
88	Matt Crafton	ThorSport Racing	Ford	Menards, Rip It
97	Jesse Little	JJL Motorsports	Ford	Wings Over North Georgia Air Show
98	Grant Enfinger	ThorSport Racing	Ford	Curb Records
Official entry list

== Practice ==
=== First practice ===
First practice was held on Friday, February 23 at 3:00 PM EST. Justin Haley of GMS Racing would set the fastest time in the session with a 31.141 and an average speed of 178.029 miles per hour (286.510 km/h).

Pos.	#	Driver	Team	Make	Time	Speed
1	24	Justin Haley	GMS Racing	Chevrolet	31.141	178.029
2	21	Johnny Sauter	GMS Racing	Chevrolet	31.315	177.040
3	13	Myatt Snider	ThorSport Racing	Ford	31.315	177.040
Full first practice results

=== Second and final practice ===
The second and final practice was held on Friday, February 23 at 4:58 PM EST. Noah Gragson of Kyle Busch Motorsports would set the fastest time in the session with a 31.011 and an average speed of 178.775 miles per hour (287.710 km/h).

Pos.	#	Driver	Team	Make	Time	Speed
1	18	Noah Gragson	Kyle Busch Motorsports	Toyota	31.011	178.775
2	41	Ben Rhodes	ThorSport Racing	Ford	31.234	177.499
3	24	Justin Haley	GMS Racing	Chevrolet	31.349	176.848
Full final practice results

== Qualifying ==
Qualifying was held on Saturday, February 24 at 11:45 AM EST. The qualifying system was a single car, single lap, two round system where in the first round, everyone would set a time to determine positions 13-32. Then, the fastest 12 qualifiers would move on to the second round to determine positions 1-12. Kyle Busch, driving for his own team Kyle Busch Motorsports would set the fastest time in Round 2 to win the pole.

Pos.	#	Driver	Team	Make	Time (R1)	Speed (R1)	Time (R2)	Speed (R2)
1	4	Kyle Busch	Kyle Busch Motorsports	Toyota			30.844	179.743
2	88	Matt Crafton	ThorSport Racing	Ford			30.934	179.220
3	18	Noah Gragson	Kyle Busch Motorsports	Toyota			30.935	179.214
4	51	Spencer Davis	Kyle Busch Motorsports	Toyota			30.996	178.862
5	24	Justin Haley	GMS Racing	Chevrolet			31.011	178.775
6	25	Dalton Sargeant	GMS Racing	Chevrolet			31.064	178.470
7	52	Stewart Friesen	Halmar Friesen Racing	Chevrolet			31.083	178.361
8	2	Cody Coughlin	GMS Racing	Chevrolet			31.086	178.344
9	21	Johnny Sauter	GMS Racing	Chevrolet			31.121	178.143
10	16	Brett Moffitt	Hattori Racing Enterprises	Toyota			31.162	177.909
11	8	Joe Nemechek	NEMCO Motorsports	Chevrolet			31.213	177.618
12	97	Jesse Little	JJL Motorsports	Ford			31.251	177.402
Eliminated in the first round
13	20	Austin Dillon	Young's Motorsports	Chevrolet	31.196	177.715	—	—
14	41	Ben Rhodes	ThorSport Racing	Ford	31.223	177.561	—	—
15	54	Bo LeMastus	DGR-Crosley	Toyota	31.244	177.442	—	—
16	98	Grant Enfinger	ThorSport Racing	Ford	31.250	177.408	—	—
17	75	Parker Kligerman	Henderson Motorsports	Chevrolet	31.295	177.153	—	—
18	02	Austin Hill	Young's Motorsports	Chevrolet	31.304	177.102	—	—
19	13	Myatt Snider	ThorSport Racing	Ford	31.362	176.774	—	—
20	22	Austin Wayne Self	Niece Motorsports	Chevrolet	31.635	175.249	—	—
21	7	Korbin Forrister	All Out Motorsports	Toyota	31.704	174.868	—	—
22	45	Justin Fontaine	Niece Motorsports	Chevrolet	31.781	174.444	—	—
23	63	Akinori Ogata	MB Motorsports	Chevrolet	32.053	172.964	—	—
24	33	Josh Reaume	Reaume Brothers Racing	Chevrolet	32.095	172.737	—	—
25	3	Jordan Anderson	Jordan Anderson Racing	Toyota	32.274	171.779	—	—
26	0	Joey Gase	Jennifer Jo Cobb Racing	Chevrolet	32.808	168.983	—	—
27	15	Robby Lyons	Premium Motorsports	Chevrolet	33.113	167.427	—	—
Qualified by owner's points
28	6	Norm Benning	Norm Benning	Chevrolet	33.518	165.404	—	—
29	49	Wendell Chavous	Premium Motorsports	Chevrolet	33.717	164.427	—	—
30	10	Jennifer Jo Cobb	Jennifer Jo Cobb Racing	Chevrolet	35.619	155.647	—	—
31	1	Clay Greenfield	TJL Motorsports	Chevrolet	36.600	151.475	—	—
32	83	Scott Stenzel	Copp Motorsports	Chevrolet	—	—	—	—
Failed to qualify
33	74	Tim Viens	Mike Harmon Racing	Chevrolet	33.988	163.116	—	—
34	50	Travis Kvapil	Beaver Motorsports	Chevrolet	—	—	—	—
Official starting lineup

== Race results ==
Stage 1 Laps: 40

Fin	#	Driver	Team	Make	Pts
1	18	Noah Gragson	Kyle Busch Motorsports	Toyota	10
2	88	Matt Crafton	ThorSport Racing	Ford	9
3	4	Kyle Busch	Kyle Busch Motorsports	Toyota	0
4	16	Brett Moffitt	Hattori Racing Enterprises	Toyota	7
5	97	Jesse Little	JJL Motorsports	Ford	6
6	41	Ben Rhodes	ThorSport Racing	Ford	5
7	21	Johnny Sauter	GMS Racing	Chevrolet	4
8	98	Grant Enfinger	ThorSport Racing	Ford	3
9	52	Stewart Friesen	Halmar Friesen Racing	Chevrolet	2
10	51	Spencer Davis	Kyle Busch Motorsports	Toyota	1

Stage 2 Laps: 40

Fin	#	Driver	Team	Make	Pts
1	4	Kyle Busch	Kyle Busch Motorsports	Toyota	0
2	21	Johnny Sauter	GMS Racing	Chevrolet	9
3	16	Brett Moffitt	Hattori Racing Enterprises	Toyota	8
4	88	Matt Crafton	ThorSport Racing	Ford	7
5	18	Noah Gragson	Kyle Busch Motorsports	Toyota	6
6	98	Grant Enfinger	ThorSport Racing	Ford	5
7	51	Spencer Davis	Kyle Busch Motorsports	Toyota	4
8	97	Jesse Little	JJL Motorsports	Ford	3
9	75	Parker Kligerman	Henderson Motorsports	Chevrolet	2
10	25	Dalton Sargeant	GMS Racing	Chevrolet	1

Stage 3 Laps: 54

Fin	St	#	Driver	Team	Make	Laps	Led	Status	Pts
1	10	16	Brett Moffitt	Hattori Racing Enterprises	Toyota	134	2	running	55
2	3	18	Noah Gragson	Kyle Busch Motorsports	Toyota	134	43	running	51
3	9	21	Johnny Sauter	GMS Racing	Chevrolet	134	12	running	47
4	14	41	Ben Rhodes	ThorSport Racing	Ford	134	0	running	38
5	2	88	Matt Crafton	ThorSport Racing	Ford	134	7	running	48
6	7	52	Stewart Friesen	Halmar Friesen Racing	Chevrolet	134	0	running	33
7	19	13	Myatt Snider	ThorSport Racing	Ford	134	3	running	30
8	12	97	Jesse Little	JJL Motorsports	Ford	134	0	running	38
9	16	98	Grant Enfinger	ThorSport Racing	Ford	134	0	running	36
10	13	20	Austin Dillon	Young's Motorsports	Chevrolet	134	0	running	0
11	17	75	Parker Kligerman	Henderson Motorsports	Chevrolet	134	0	running	28
12	11	8	Joe Nemechek	NEMCO Motorsports	Chevrolet	134	0	running	25
13	4	51	Spencer Davis	Kyle Busch Motorsports	Toyota	134	0	running	29
14	6	25	Dalton Sargeant	GMS Racing	Chevrolet	134	0	running	24
15	20	22	Austin Wayne Self	Niece Motorsports	Chevrolet	134	0	running	22
16	21	7	Korbin Forrister	All Out Motorsports	Toyota	134	0	running	21
17	15	54	Bo LeMastus	DGR-Crosley	Toyota	134	0	running	20
18	18	02	Austin Hill	Young's Motorsports	Chevrolet	133	0	running	19
19	22	45	Justin Fontaine	Niece Motorsports	Chevrolet	133	0	running	18
20	8	2	Cody Coughlin	GMS Racing	Chevrolet	133	0	running	17
21	1	4	Kyle Busch	Kyle Busch Motorsports	Toyota	133	67	running	0
22	5	24	Justin Haley	GMS Racing	Chevrolet	132	0	running	15
23	29	49	Wendell Chavous	Premium Motorsports	Chevrolet	131	0	running	14
24	25	3	Jordan Anderson	Jordan Anderson Racing	Toyota	129	0	running	13
25	27	15	Robby Lyons	Premium Motorsports	Chevrolet	128	0	running	12
26	30	10	Jennifer Jo Cobb	Jennifer Jo Cobb Racing	Chevrolet	120	0	running	11
27	24	33	Josh Reaume	Reaume Brothers Racing	Chevrolet	119	0	crash	10
28	31	1	Clay Greenfield	TJL Motorsports	Chevrolet	116	0	too slow	9
29	28	6	Norm Benning	Norm Benning	Chevrolet	108	0	vibration	8
30	23	63	Akinori Ogata	MB Motorsports	Chevrolet	62	0	crash	7
31	26	0	Joey Gase	Jennifer Jo Cobb Racing	Chevrolet	7	0	electrical	0
32	32	83	Scott Stenzel	Copp Motorsports	Chevrolet	0	0	electrical	5
Failed to qualify
33		74	Tim Viens	Mike Harmon Racing	Chevrolet				
34		50	Travis Kvapil	Beaver Motorsports	Chevrolet				

Previous race: 2018 NextEra Energy Resources 250	NASCAR Camping World Truck Series; 2018 season	Next race: 2018 Stratosphere 200
