= 2017 Lucas Oil 150 =

22nd race of the 2017 NASCAR Camping World Truck Series

Race details
- Race 22 of 23 of the 2017 NASCAR Camping World Truck Series
- Date: November 10, 2017
- Official name: 23rd Annual Lucas Oil 150
- Location: Avondale, Arizona, Phoenix International Raceway
- Course: Permanent racing facility
- Course length: 1 miles (1.6 km)
- Distance: 150 laps, 150 mi (241.401 km)
- Scheduled distance: 150 laps, 150 mi (241.401 km)
- Average speed: 89.05 miles per hour (143.31 km/h)

Pole position
Driver	Christopher Bell	Kyle Busch Motorsports
- Time: 26.275

Most laps led
Driver	Christopher Bell	Kyle Busch Motorsports
- Laps: 90

Winner
No. 21	Johnny Sauter	GMS Racing

Television in the United States
- Network: Fox Sports 1
- Announcers: Vince Welch, Phil Parsons, Michael Waltrip

Radio in the United States
- Radio: Motor Racing Network

The 2017 Lucas Oil 150 was the 22nd stock car race of the 2017 NASCAR Camping World Truck Series, the fifth race of the 2017 NASCAR Camping World Truck Series playoffs, the third and final race of the Round of 6, and the 23rd iteration of the event. The race was held on Friday, November 10, 2017, in Avondale, Arizona at Phoenix International Raceway, a 1-mile (1.6 km) permanent low-banked tri-oval race track. The race took the scheduled 150 laps to complete. On the final restart with seven to go, GMS Racing driver Johnny Sauter would come out victorious in a battle with eventual second-place finisher, NEMCO Motorsports driver John Hunter Nemechek, to win his 17th career NASCAR Camping World Truck Series win and his fourth and final win of the season. To fill out the podium, Cody Coughlin of ThorSport Racing would finish third.

Meanwhile, the four drivers to make the Championship 4 round were: Christopher Bell, Johnny Sauter, Matt Crafton, and Austin Cindric.

== Background ==
The layout of Phoenix International Raceway, the venue where the race was held.

Phoenix International Raceway – also known as PIR – is a one-mile, low-banked tri-oval race track located in Avondale, Arizona. It is named after the nearby metropolitan area of Phoenix. The motorsport track opened in 1964 and currently hosts two NASCAR race weekends annually. PIR has also hosted the IndyCar Series, CART, USAC and the Rolex Sports Car Series. The raceway is currently owned and operated by International Speedway Corporation.

The raceway was originally constructed with a 2.5 mi (4.0 km) road course that ran both inside and outside of the main tri-oval. In 1991 the track was reconfigured with the current 1.51 mi (2.43 km) interior layout. PIR has an estimated grandstand seating capacity of around 67,000. Lights were installed around the track in 2004 following the addition of a second annual NASCAR race weekend.

=== Entry list ===
- (R) denotes rookie driver.
- (i) denotes driver who is ineligible for series driver points.

#	Driver	Team	Make	Sponsor
0	Ray Ciccarelli	Jennifer Jo Cobb Racing	Chevrolet	Driven 2 Honor
1	Jordan Anderson	TJL Motorsports	Chevrolet	Lucas Oil
02	Austin Hill	Young's Motorsports	Ford	United Rentals
4	Christopher Bell	Kyle Busch Motorsports	Toyota	Toyota
6	Norm Benning	Norm Benning Racing	Chevrolet	Norm Benning Racing
8	John Hunter Nemechek	NEMCO Motorsports	Chevrolet	Fire Alarm Services
10	Jennifer Jo Cobb	Jennifer Jo Cobb Racing	Chevrolet	Driven 2 Honor
13	Cody Coughlin (R)	ThorSport Racing	Toyota	RIDE TV
15	Jason Hathaway	Premium Motorsports	Chevrolet	Choko Authentics, Kubota
16	Ryan Truex	Hattori Racing Enterprises	Toyota	Kobe Toyopet
18	Noah Gragson (R)	Kyle Busch Motorsports	Toyota	Switch
19	Austin Cindric (R)	Brad Keselowski Racing	Ford	Reese Brands, Draw-Tite
21	Johnny Sauter	GMS Racing	Chevrolet	ISM Connect
24	Justin Haley (R)	GMS Racing	Chevrolet	Fraternal Order of Eagles
27	Ben Rhodes	ThorSport Racing	Toyota	Safelite AutoGlass
29	Chase Briscoe (R)	Brad Keselowski Racing	Ford	Checkered Flag Foundation
33	Kaz Grala (R)	GMS Racing	Chevrolet	Nettts
44	Austin Wayne Self	Martins Motorsports	Chevrolet	AM Technical Solutions, Don't Mess with Texas
45	T. J. Bell	Niece Motorsports	Chevrolet	Niece Motorsports
49	Robby Lyons (i)	Premium Motorsports	Chevrolet	Sunwest Construction
50	Josh Reaume	Beaver Motorsports	Chevrolet	Beaver Motorsports
51	Todd Gilliland	Kyle Busch Motorsports	Toyota	Pedigree
52	Stewart Friesen (R)	Halmar Friesen Racing	Chevrolet	Halmar "We Build America"
57	Mike Senica	Norm Benning Racing	Chevrolet	Norm Benning Racing
63	Ted Minor	MB Motorsports	Chevrolet	Shawn Magee Design
74	Mike Harmon (i)	Mike Harmon Racing	Chevrolet	Mike Harmon Racing
83	Bayley Currey	Copp Motorsports	Chevrolet	Baja, Preferred Industrial Contractors, Inc.
87	Joe Nemechek	NEMCO Motorsports	Chevrolet	Fire Alarm Services
88	Matt Crafton	ThorSport Racing	Toyota	Menards, Ideal Door
97	Jesse Little	JJL Motorsports	Toyota	JJL Motorsports
98	Grant Enfinger (R)	ThorSport Racing	Toyota	JIVE Communications
99	Dalton Sargeant	MDM Motorsports	Chevrolet	Performance Plus Motor Oil
Official entry list

== Practice ==
The only practice session was held on Friday, November 10, at 9:00 a.m. MST. The session would last for one hour and 50 minutes. Todd Gilliland of Kyle Busch Motorsports would set the fastest time in the session, with a lap of 26.576 and an average speed of 135.461 miles per hour (218.003 km/h).

Pos.	#	Driver	Team	Make	Time	Speed
1	51	Todd Gilliland	Kyle Busch Motorsports	Toyota	26.576	135.461
2	4	Christopher Bell	Kyle Busch Motorsports	Toyota	26.660	135.034
3	88	Matt Crafton	ThorSport Racing	Toyota	26.768	134.489
Full practice results

== Qualifying ==
Qualifying was held on Friday, November 10, at 3:30 p.m. MST. Since Phoenix International Raceway is under 1.5 miles (2.4 km) in length, the qualifying system was a multi-car system that included three rounds. The first round was 15 minutes, where every driver would be able to set a lap within the 15 minutes. Then, the second round would consist of the fastest 24 cars in Round 1, and drivers would have 10 minutes to set a lap. Round 3 consisted of the fastest 12 drivers from Round 2, and the drivers would have 5 minutes to set a time. Whoever was fastest in Round 3 would win the pole.

Christopher Bell of Kyle Busch Motorsports would win the pole after advancing from both preliminary rounds and setting the fastest lap in Round 3, setting a time of 26.275 and an average speed of 137.012 miles per hour (220.499 km/h) in the third round.

No drivers would fail to qualify.

=== Full qualifying results ===
Pos.	#	Driver	Team	Make	Time (R1)	Speed (R1)	Time (R2)	Speed (R2)	Time (R3)	Speed (R3)
1	4	Christopher Bell	Kyle Busch Motorsports	Toyota	-*	-*	-*	-*	26.275	137.012
2	18	Noah Gragson (R)	Kyle Busch Motorsports	Toyota	-*	-*	-*	-*	26.545	135.619
3	27	Ben Rhodes	ThorSport Racing	Toyota	-*	-*	-*	-*	26.596	135.359
4	88	Matt Crafton	ThorSport Racing	Toyota	-*	-*	-*	-*	26.604	135.318
5	51	Todd Gilliland	Kyle Busch Motorsports	Toyota	-*	-*	-*	-*	26.664	135.014
6	8	John Hunter Nemechek	NEMCO Motorsports	Chevrolet	-*	-*	-*	-*	26.702	134.821
7	19	Austin Cindric (R)	Brad Keselowski Racing	Ford	-*	-*	-*	-*	26.737	134.645
8	29	Chase Briscoe (R)	Brad Keselowski Racing	Ford	-*	-*	-*	-*	26.801	134.323
9	98	Grant Enfinger (R)	ThorSport Racing	Toyota	-*	-*	-*	-*	26.918	133.740
10	21	Johnny Sauter	GMS Racing	Chevrolet	-*	-*	-*	-*	26.955	133.556
11	16	Ryan Truex	Hattori Racing Enterprises	Toyota	-*	-*	-*	-*	26.974	133.462
12	52	Stewart Friesen (R)	Halmar Friesen Racing	Chevrolet	-*	-*	-*	-*	27.038	133.146
Eliminated in Round 2
13	13	Cody Coughlin (R)	ThorSport Racing	Toyota	-*	-*	27.026	133.205	-	-
14	99	Dalton Sargeant	MDM Motorsports	Chevrolet	-*	-*	27.050	133.087	-	-
15	33	Kaz Grala (R)	GMS Racing	Chevrolet	-*	-*	27.111	132.787	-	-
16	24	Justin Haley (R)	GMS Racing	Chevrolet	-*	-*	27.181	132.445	-	-
17	02	Austin Hill	Young's Motorsports	Ford	-*	-*	27.564	130.605	-	-
18	45	T. J. Bell	Niece Motorsports	Chevrolet	-*	-*	27.839	129.315	-	-
19	87	Joe Nemechek	NEMCO Motorsports	Chevrolet	-*	-*	27.886	129.097	-	-
20	49	Robby Lyons (i)	Premium Motorsports	Chevrolet	-*	-*	27.897	129.046	-	-
21	83	Bayley Currey	Copp Motorsports	Chevrolet	-*	-*	28.040	128.388	-	-
22	44	Austin Wayne Self	Martins Motorsports	Chevrolet	-*	-*	28.156	127.859	-	-
23	15	Jason Hathaway	Premium Motorsports	Chevrolet	-*	-*	28.317	127.132	-	-
24	97	Jesse Little	JJL Motorsports	Toyota	28.274	127.325	-	-	-	-
Eliminated in Round 1
25	50	Josh Reaume	Beaver Motorsports	Chevrolet	28.376	126.868	-	-	-	-
26	1	Jordan Anderson	TJL Motorsports	Chevrolet	28.435	126.605	-	-	-	-
27	74	Mike Harmon (i)	Mike Harmon Racing	Chevrolet	28.599	125.879	-	-	-	-
Qualified by owner's points
28	6	Norm Benning	Norm Benning Racing	Chevrolet	29.862	120.555	-	-	-	-
29	10	Jennifer Jo Cobb	Jennifer Jo Cobb Racing	Chevrolet	30.010	119.960	-	-	-	-
30	0	Ray Ciccarelli	Jennifer Jo Cobb Racing	Chevrolet	30.260	118.969	-	-	-	-
31	63	Ted Minor	MB Motorsports	Chevrolet	30.810	116.845	-	-	-	-
32	57	Mike Senica	Norm Benning Racing	Chevrolet	33.278	108.180	-	-	-	-
Official starting lineup

*Time not available.

== Race results ==
Stage 1 Laps: 40

Pos.	#	Driver	Team	Make	Pts
1	4	Christopher Bell	Kyle Busch Motorsports	Toyota	10
2	18	Noah Gragson (R)	Kyle Busch Motorsports	Toyota	9
3	88	Matt Crafton	ThorSport Racing	Toyota	8
4	27	Ben Rhodes	ThorSport Racing	Toyota	7
5	8	John Hunter Nemechek	NEMCO Motorsports	Chevrolet	6
6	21	Johnny Sauter	GMS Racing	Chevrolet	5
7	19	Austin Cindric (R)	Brad Keselowski Racing	Ford	4
8	51	Todd Gilliland	Kyle Busch Motorsports	Toyota	3
9	98	Grant Enfinger (R)	ThorSport Racing	Toyota	2
10	16	Ryan Truex	Hattori Racing Enterprises	Toyota	1

Stage 2 Laps: 40

Pos.	#	Driver	Team	Make	Pts
1	4	Christopher Bell	Kyle Busch Motorsports	Toyota	10
2	18	Noah Gragson (R)	Kyle Busch Motorsports	Toyota	9
3	88	Matt Crafton	ThorSport Racing	Toyota	8
4	27	Ben Rhodes	ThorSport Racing	Toyota	7
5	19	Austin Cindric (R)	Brad Keselowski Racing	Ford	6
6	21	Johnny Sauter	GMS Racing	Chevrolet	5
7	8	John Hunter Nemechek	NEMCO Motorsports	Chevrolet	4
8	51	Todd Gilliland	Kyle Busch Motorsports	Toyota	3
9	16	Ryan Truex	Hattori Racing Enterprises	Toyota	2
10	52	Stewart Friesen (R)	Halmar Friesen Racing	Chevrolet	1

Stage 3 Laps: 70

Fin	St	#	Driver	Team	Make	Laps	Led	Status	Pts
1	10	21	Johnny Sauter	GMS Racing	Chevrolet	150	5	running	50
2	6	8	John Hunter Nemechek	NEMCO Motorsports	Chevrolet	150	0	running	45
3	13	13	Cody Coughlin (R)	ThorSport Racing	Toyota	150	0	running	34
4	8	29	Chase Briscoe (R)	Brad Keselowski Racing	Ford	150	0	running	33
5	15	33	Kaz Grala (R)	GMS Racing	Chevrolet	150	0	running	32
6	12	52	Stewart Friesen (R)	Halmar Friesen Racing	Chevrolet	150	0	running	32
7	5	51	Todd Gilliland	Kyle Busch Motorsports	Toyota	150	0	running	36
8	1	4	Christopher Bell	Kyle Busch Motorsports	Toyota	150	90	running	49
9	7	19	Austin Cindric (R)	Brad Keselowski Racing	Ford	150	0	running	38
10	21	83	Bayley Currey	Copp Motorsports	Chevrolet	150	0	running	27
11	23	15	Jason Hathaway	Premium Motorsports	Chevrolet	147	0	running	26
12	20	49	Robby Lyons (i)	Premium Motorsports	Chevrolet	145	0	running	0
13	26	1	Jordan Anderson	TJL Motorsports	Chevrolet	144	0	running	24
14	16	24	Justin Haley (R)	GMS Racing	Chevrolet	143	0	crash	23
15	2	18	Noah Gragson (R)	Kyle Busch Motorsports	Toyota	142	55	crash	40
16	25	50	Josh Reaume	Beaver Motorsports	Chevrolet	141	0	running	21
17	14	99	Dalton Sargeant	MDM Motorsports	Chevrolet	134	0	crash	20
18	24	97	Jesse Little	JJL Motorsports	Toyota	134	0	crash	19
19	11	16	Ryan Truex	Hattori Racing Enterprises	Toyota	134	0	crash	21
20	3	27	Ben Rhodes	ThorSport Racing	Toyota	129	0	crash	31
21	4	88	Matt Crafton	ThorSport Racing	Toyota	129	0	crash	32
22	28	6	Norm Benning	Norm Benning Racing	Chevrolet	106	0	crash	15
23	17	02	Austin Hill	Young's Motorsports	Ford	104	0	brakes	14
24	9	98	Grant Enfinger (R)	ThorSport Racing	Toyota	75	0	crash	15
25	22	44	Austin Wayne Self	Martins Motorsports	Chevrolet	55	0	engine	12
26	30	0	Ray Ciccarelli	Jennifer Jo Cobb Racing	Chevrolet	21	0	electrical	11
27	29	10	Jennifer Jo Cobb	Jennifer Jo Cobb Racing	Chevrolet	20	0	engine	10
28	27	74	Mike Harmon (i)	Mike Harmon Racing	Chevrolet	19	0	brakes	0
29	19	87	Joe Nemechek	NEMCO Motorsports	Chevrolet	12	0	electrical	8
30	18	45	T. J. Bell	Niece Motorsports	Chevrolet	10	0	electrical	7
31	31	63	Ted Minor	MB Motorsports	Chevrolet	6	0	electrical	6
32	32	57	Mike Senica	Norm Benning Racing	Chevrolet	3	0	electrical	5
Official race results

== Standings after the race ==
Drivers' Championship standings

Pos	Driver	Points
1	Christopher Bell	3,184
2	Johnny Sauter	3,181 (-3)
3	Matt Crafton	3,136 (–48)
4	Austin Cindric	3,123 (–61)
5	Ben Rhodes	3,111 (–73)
6	John Hunter Nemechek	3,091 (–93)
7	Chase Briscoe	2,191 (–993)
8	Kaz Grala	2,190 (–994)
Official driver's standings

- Note: Only the first 8 positions are included for the driver standings.

Previous race: 2017 JAG Metals 350	NASCAR Camping World Truck Series; 2017 season	Next race: 2017 Ford EcoBoost 200
