= 2018 37 Kind Days 250 =

Race details
- Race 6 of 23 of the 2018 NASCAR Camping World Truck Series
- Date: May 11, 2018
- Official name: 37 Kind Days 250
- Location: Kansas City, Kansas, Kansas Speedway
- Course: Permanent racing facility
- Course length: 1.5 miles (2.41 km)
- Distance: 167 laps, 250.5 mi (403.14 km)
- Scheduled distance: 167 laps, 250.5 mi (403.14 km)
- Average speed: 134.137 miles per hour (215.873 km/h)

Pole position
Driver	Noah Gragson	Kyle Busch Motorsports
- Time: 30.564

Most laps led
Driver	Noah Gragson	Kyle Busch Motorsports
- Laps: 128

Winner
No. 18	Noah Gragson	Kyle Busch Motorsports

Television in the United States
- Network: Fox Sports 1
- Announcers: Vince Welch, Phil Parsons, Michael Waltrip

Radio in the United States
- Radio: Motor Racing Network

The 2018 37 Kind Days 250 was the sixth stock car race of the 2018 NASCAR Camping World Truck Series season, and the 18th iteration of the event. The event was held on Friday, May 11, 2018 in Kansas City, Kansas at Kansas Speedway. The race rook 167 laps to complete. Noah Gragson of Kyle Busch Motorsports would dominate the race, and eventually win the race, the first and only win of the season and the second of his career. To fill out the podium, Kyle Busch of Kyle Busch Motorsports and Stewart Friesen of Halmar Friesen Racing finished 2nd and 3rd, respectively.

== Background ==
The layout of Kansas Speedway, the venue where the race was held.

Kansas Speedway is a 1.5-mile (2.4 km) tri-oval race track in Kansas City, Kansas. It was built in 2001 and hosts two annual NASCAR race weekends. The NTT IndyCar Series also raced there until 2011. The speedway is owned and operated by the International Speedway Corporation.

=== Entry list ===
#	Driver	Team	Make	Sponsor
0	Joey Gase	Jennifer Jo Cobb Racing	Chevrolet	Jennifer Jo Cobb Racing
1	Camden Murphy	TJL Motorsports	Chevrolet	Crossbar E-Cigarettes
2	Cody Coughlin	GMS Racing	Chevrolet	Jegs
02	Austin Hill	Young's Motorsports	Chevrolet	United Rentals
3	Jordan Anderson	Jordan Anderson Racing	Chevrolet	Bommarito Automotive Group
4	Kyle Busch	Kyle Busch Motorsports	Toyota	Beechcraft, Cessna
6	Norm Benning	Norm Benning Racing	Chevrolet	Zomongo
8	John Hunter Nemechek	NEMCO Motorsports	Chevrolet	Fleetwing
10	Jennifer Jo Cobb	Jennifer Jo Cobb Racing	Chevrolet	Mark One Electric, Think Realty
13	Myatt Snider	ThorSport Racing	Ford	Louisiana Hot Sauce
15	Robby Lyons	Premium Motorsports	Chevrolet	Sunwest Construction, Finke Brothers, Inc.
16	Brett Moffitt	Hattori Racing Enterprises	Toyota	Central Plains Cement Company, Concrete Supply
18	Noah Gragson	Kyle Busch Motorsports	Toyota	Safelite Auto Glass
20	Bubba Wallace	Young's Motorsports	Chevrolet	Andy's Frozen Custard
21	Johnny Sauter	GMS Racing	Chevrolet	ISM Connect
22	Austin Wayne Self	Niece Motorsports	Chevrolet	CForce by Chuck Norris "A Force Of Nature", GO TEXAN. "Don't mess with Texas"
24	Justin Haley	GMS Racing	Chevrolet	Fraternal Order of Eagles
25	Dalton Sargeant	GMS Racing	Chevrolet	Performance Plus Motor Oil
33	Josh Reaume	Reaume Brothers Racing	Toyota	IG Racing
36	Bayley Currey	Copp Motorsports	Chevrolet	First Responder Racing
41	Ben Rhodes	ThorSport Racing	Ford	Alpha Energy Solutions
45	Justin Fontaine	Niece Motorsports	Chevrolet	ProMatic Automation
49	Wendell Chavous	Premium Motorsports	Chevrolet	SobrietyNation.org
50	Jamie Mosley	Beaver Motorsports	Chevrolet	Crossbar E-Cigarettes
51	Brandon Jones	Kyle Busch Motorsports	Toyota	Lyons Bathtubs & Showers
52	Stewart Friesen	Halmar Friesen Racing	Chevrolet	Halmar "We Build America"
54	Bo LeMastus	DGR-Crosley	Toyota	Crosley Brands
63	Kevin Donahue	MB Motorsports	Chevrolet	First Responder Racing, Mittler Bros
74	Mike Harmon	Mike Harmon Racing	Chevrolet	Horizon Transport, Koolbox
83	Kyle Donahue	MB Motorsports	Chevrolet	First Responder Racing
87	Joe Nemechek	NEMCO Motorsports	Chevrolet	NEMCO Motorsports
88	Matt Crafton	ThorSport Racing	Ford	Menards, Flex Seal
98	Grant Enfinger	ThorSport Racing	Ford	Protect the Harvest
Official entry list

== Practice ==
=== First and final practice ===
The first and final practice was held on 10:35 AM CST. Matt Crafton of ThorSport Racing would set the fastest time in practice with a 30.401 and an average speed of 177.626 miles per hour (285.861 km/h).

Pos.	#	Driver	Team	Make	Time	Speed
1	88	Matt Crafton	ThorSport Racing	Ford	30.401	177.626
2	13	Myatt Snider	ThorSport Racing	Ford	30.647	176.200
3	16	Brett Moffitt	Hattori Racing Enterprises	Toyota	30.653	176.165
Full first practice results

== Qualifying ==
Qualifying would take place on Friday, May 11, at 4:05 PM CST. Since Kansas Speedway was at least 1.5 miles (2.4 km), the qualifying system was a single car, single lap, two round system where in the first round, everyone would set a time to determine positions 13-32. Then, the fastest 12 qualifiers would move on to the second round to determine positions 1-12.

While Noah Gragson would not the set the fastest time in Round 1 (the honor would go to Matt Crafton of ThorSport Racing), he would set a time fast enough to advance into Round 2. He would proceed to set the fastest time in Round 2 and win the pole for the race.

Myatt Snider of ThorSport Racing would be the only driver not to set a time. During his pole lap, he would spin off of Turn 4. While no damage was caused to the vehicle, he would not set the lap, and take the last starting position.

Camden Murphy of TJL Motorsports would be the only driver not to qualify, finishing just under 3 seconds off of a guaranteed spot and just under 8 tenths of the second to last qualifier, Kyle Donahue of MB Motorsports.

Pos.	#	Driver	Team	Make	Time (R1)	Speed (R1)	Time (R2)	Speed (R2)
1	18	Noah Gragson	Kyle Busch Motorsports	Toyota	30.728	175.735	30.564	176.678
2	2	Cody Coughlin	GMS Racing	Chevrolet	30.769	175.501	30.598	176.482
3	88	Matt Crafton	ThorSport Racing	Ford	30.629	176.304	30.602	176.459
4	98	Grant Enfinger	ThorSport Racing	Ford	30.861	174.978	30.619	176.361
5	21	Johnny Sauter	GMS Racing	Chevrolet	30.711	175.833	30.655	176.154
6	4	Kyle Busch	Kyle Busch Motorsports	Toyota	30.762	175.541	30.701	175.890
7	41	Ben Rhodes	ThorSport Racing	Ford	30.794	175.359	30.730	175.724
8	52	Stewart Friesen	Halmar Friesen Racing	Chevrolet	30.780	175.439	30.829	175.160
9	02	Austin Hill	Young's Motorsports	Chevrolet	30.953	174.458	30.852	175.029
10	16	Brett Moffitt	Hattori Racing Enterprises	Toyota	30.931	174.582	30.854	175.018
11	25	Dalton Sargeant	GMS Racing	Chevrolet	30.967	174.379	30.954	174.452
12	24	Justin Haley	GMS Racing	Chevrolet	30.887	174.831	31.001	174.188
Eliminated in Round 1
13	51	Brandon Jones	Kyle Busch Motorsports	Toyota	31.039	173.975	—	—
14	8	John Hunter Nemechek	NEMCO Motorsports	Chevrolet	31.059	173.863	—	—
15	20	Bubba Wallace	Young's Motorsports	Chevrolet	31.185	173.160	—	—
16	54	Bo LeMastus	DGR-Crosley	Toyota	31.229	172.916	—	—
17	45	Justin Fontaine	Niece Motorsports	Chevrolet	31.242	172.844	—	—
18	49	Wendell Chavous	Premium Motorsports	Chevrolet	31.396	171.996	—	—
19	22	Austin Wayne Self	Niece Motorsports	Chevrolet	31.437	171.772	—	—
20	63	Kevin Donahue	MB Motorsports	Chevrolet	31.472	171.581	—	—
21	3	Jordan Anderson	Jordan Anderson Racing	Chevrolet	31.540	171.211	—	—
22	87	Joe Nemechek	NEMCO Motorsports	Chevrolet	31.751	170.073	—	—
23	0	Joey Gase	Jennifer Jo Cobb Racing	Chevrolet	32.143	167.999	—	—
24	36	Bayley Currey	Copp Motorsports	Chevrolet	32.400	166.667	—	—
25	33	Josh Reaume	Reaume Brothers Racing	Toyota	32.532	165.990	—	—
26	50	Jamie Mosley	Beaver Motorsports	Chevrolet	32.583	165.731	—	—
27	15	Robby Lyons	Premium Motorsports	Chevrolet	32.653	165.375	—	—
Qualified by owner's points
28	6	Norm Benning	Norm Benning Racing	Chevrolet	33.148	162.906	—	—
29	10	Jennifer Jo Cobb	Jennifer Jo Cobb Racing	Chevrolet	33.190	162.700	—	—
30	74	Mike Harmon	Mike Harmon Racing	Chevrolet	33.619	160.623	—	—
31	83	Kyle Donahue	MB Motorsports	Chevrolet	34.735	155.463	—	—
32	13	Myatt Snider	ThorSport Racing	Ford	—	—	—	—
Failed to qualify
33	1	Camden Murphy	TJL Motorsports	Chevrolet	35.522	152.018	—	—
Official first and second round results

== Race results ==
Stage 1 Laps: 40

Fin	#	Driver	Team	Make	Pts
1	18	Noah Gragson	Kyle Busch Motorsports	Toyota	10
2	4	Kyle Busch	Kyle Busch Motorsports	Toyota	0
3	16	Brett Moffitt	Hattori Racing Enterprises	Toyota	8
4	41	Ben Rhodes	ThorSport Racing	Ford	7
5	98	Grant Enfinger	ThorSport Racing	Ford	6
6	8	John Hunter Nemechek	NEMCO Motorsports	Chevrolet	0
7	51	Brandon Jones	Kyle Busch Motorsports	Toyota	0
8	88	Matt Crafton	ThorSport Racing	Ford	3
9	21	Johnny Sauter	GMS Racing	Chevrolet	2
10	52	Stewart Friesen	Halmar Friesen Racing	Chevrolet	1

Stage 2 Laps: 40

Fin	#	Driver	Team	Make	Pts
1	18	Noah Gragson	Kyle Busch Motorsports	Toyota	10
2	16	Brett Moffitt	Hattori Racing Enterprises	Toyota	9
3	4	Kyle Busch	Kyle Busch Motorsports	Toyota	0
4	51	Brandon Jones	Kyle Busch Motorsports	Toyota	0
5	52	Stewart Friesen	Halmar Friesen Racing	Chevrolet	6
6	8	John Hunter Nemechek	NEMCO Motorsports	Chevrolet	0
7	98	Grant Enfinger	ThorSport Racing	Ford	4
8	21	Johnny Sauter	GMS Racing	Chevrolet	3
9	88	Matt Crafton	ThorSport Racing	Ford	2
10	2	Cody Coughlin	GMS Racing	Chevrolet	1

Stage 3 Laps: 87

Fin	St	#	Driver	Team	Make	Laps	Led	Status	Pts
1	1	18	Noah Gragson	Kyle Busch Motorsports	Toyota	167	128	running	60
2	6	4	Kyle Busch	Kyle Busch Motorsports	Toyota	167	1	running	0
3	8	52	Stewart Friesen	Halmar Friesen Racing	Chevrolet	167	6	running	41
4	14	8	John Hunter Nemechek	NEMCO Motorsports	Chevrolet	167	0	running	0
5	5	21	Johnny Sauter	GMS Racing	Chevrolet	167	14	running	37
6	3	88	Matt Crafton	ThorSport Racing	Ford	167	4	running	36
7	2	2	Cody Coughlin	GMS Racing	Chevrolet	167	0	running	31
8	4	98	Grant Enfinger	ThorSport Racing	Ford	167	0	running	39
9	13	51	Brandon Jones	Kyle Busch Motorsports	Toyota	167	0	running	0
10	12	24	Justin Haley	GMS Racing	Chevrolet	166	4	running	27
11	11	25	Dalton Sargeant	GMS Racing	Chevrolet	165	0	running	26
12	9	02	Austin Hill	Young's Motorsports	Chevrolet	165	0	running	25
13	19	22	Austin Wayne Self	Niece Motorsports	Chevrolet	164	0	running	24
14	15	20	Bubba Wallace	Young's Motorsports	Chevrolet	164	0	running	0
15	32	13	Myatt Snider	ThorSport Racing	Ford	164	9	running	22
16	10	16	Brett Moffitt	Hattori Racing Enterprises	Toyota	163	0	running	38
17	17	45	Justin Fontaine	Niece Motorsports	Chevrolet	163	0	running	20
18	7	41	Ben Rhodes	ThorSport Racing	Ford	162	1	running	26
19	16	54	Bo LeMastus	DGR-Crosley	Toyota	160	0	running	18
20	31	83	Kyle Donahue	MB Motorsports	Chevrolet	159	0	running	17
21	25	33	Josh Reaume	Reaume Brothers Racing	Toyota	158	0	running	16
22	29	10	Jennifer Jo Cobb	Jennifer Jo Cobb Racing	Chevrolet	157	0	running	15
23	28	6	Norm Benning	Norm Benning Racing	Chevrolet	157	0	running	14
24	30	74	Mike Harmon	Mike Harmon Racing	Chevrolet	146	0	oil leak	0
25	21	3	Jordan Anderson	Jordan Anderson Racing	Chevrolet	139	0	running	12
26	27	15	Robby Lyons	Premium Motorsports	Chevrolet	139	0	running	11
27	18	49	Wendell Chavous	Premium Motorsports	Chevrolet	131	0	suspension	10
28	26	50	Jamie Mosley	Beaver Motorsports	Chevrolet	66	0	overheating	9
29	24	36	Bayley Currey	Copp Motorsports	Chevrolet	30	0	transmission	8
30	22	87	Joe Nemechek	NEMCO Motorsports	Chevrolet	27	0	overheating	7
31	23	0	Joey Gase	Jennifer Jo Cobb Racing	Chevrolet	6	0	electrical	0
32	20	63	Kevin Donahue	MB Motorsports	Chevrolet	0	0	transmission	5
Failed to qualify
33		1	Camden Murphy	TJL Motorsports	Chevrolet				
Official race results

Previous race: 2018 JEGS 200	NASCAR Camping World Truck Series; 2018 season	Next race: 2018 North Carolina Education Lottery 200
