= Jesse Little =

American racing driver (born 1997)

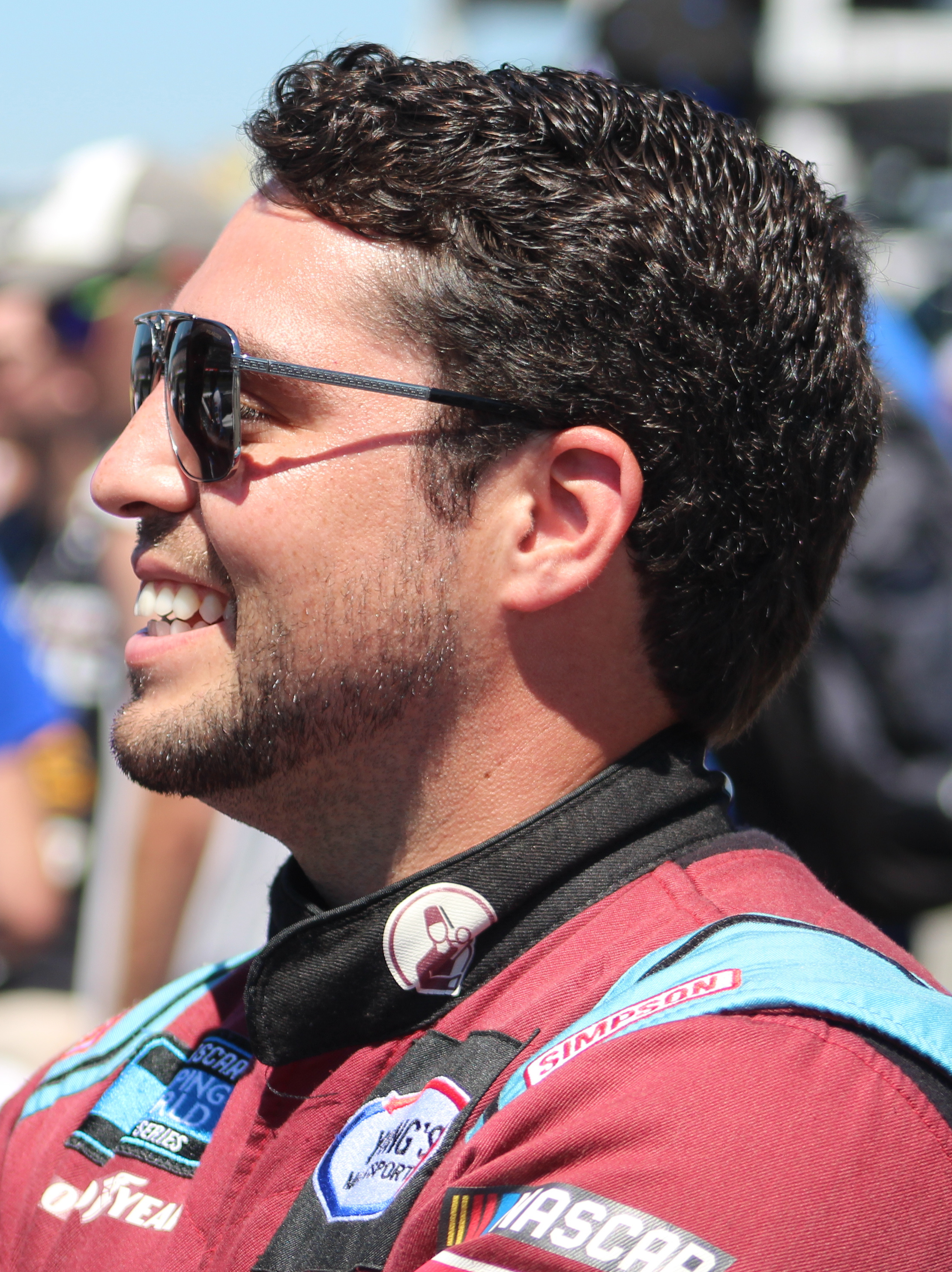
- Little at Pocono Raceway in 2022
- Born: Jesse Hardin Little; April 15, 1997 (age 29); Sherrills Ford, North Carolina, U.S.
- Achievements: 2010 USAC Eastern Young Guns Ford Focus Midget Car Series Champion
- Awards: 2013 NASCAR K&N Pro Series East Rookie of the Year; 2010 USAC Eastern Young Guns Ford Focus Midget Car Series Rookie of the Year

NASCAR Cup Series career
- 2 races run over 1 year
- 2018 position: 70th
- Best finish: 70th (2018)
- First race: 2018 Quaker State 400 (Kentucky)
- Last race: 2018 Bass Pro Shops NRA Night Race (Bristol)
Wins	Top tens	Poles
0	0	0

NASCAR O'Reilly Auto Parts Series career
- 56 races run over 2 years
- 2022 position: 110th
- Best finish: 19th (2020)
- First race: 2020 NASCAR Racing Experience 300 (Daytona)
- Last race: 2021 Kansas Lottery 300 (Kansas)
Wins	Top tens	Poles
0	2	0

NASCAR FedEx Freight Truck Series career
- 47 races run over 7 years
- 2022 position: 27th
- Best finish: 19th (2018)
- First race: 2015 Lucas Oil 200 (Dover)
- Last race: 2022 UNOH 200 (Bristol)
Wins	Top tens	Poles
0	8	0
- Statistics up to date as of November 5, 2022.

Jesse Hardin Little (born April 15, 1997) is an American former professional stock car racing driver who currently serves as the vice president of business development for Sam Hunt Racing. He last competed part-time in the NASCAR Xfinity Series driving the No. 34 Chevrolet Camaro for Jesse Iwuji Motorsports and part-time in the NASCAR Camping World Truck Series, driving the No. 02 and 20 Chevrolet Silverado for Young's Motorsports. He is the son of former NASCAR driver Chad Little. He and his father as well as Jason Little (Jesse's uncle and Chad's brother) previously owned a Truck, East and West Series team, which was known as Team Little Racing and then JJL Motorsports, from 2012 to 2019.

== Racing career ==
=== Early career ===
A native of Sherrills Ford, North Carolina and a third-generation racer, Little began his racing career in quarter midgets at the age of seven, moving up to Bandoleros in 2007 and Legends cars in 2009. He won the 2010 USAC Eastern Focus Young Guns midget car championship, and in 2011 competed in the UARA Stars late model series.

=== NASCAR ===
Little made his debut in NASCAR competition at the age of fifteen, competing in seven K&N Pro Series East events in 2012; driving a family-owned No. 97 Chevrolet, he was the youngest driver ever to start a race in the series. He returned to the K&N Pro Series East full-time in 2013, driving for Coulter Motorsports; he finished in the top-ten eight times on his way to the series' Rookie of the Year award. He returned to K&N East competition again in 2014, winning his first race at New Hampshire. Little raced in the K&N East series on a part-time basis in 2015, winning at Iowa Speedway with Hattori Racing Enterprises.

In 2015, Little added a limited schedule in the Camping World Truck Series in a partnership with ThorSport Racing.

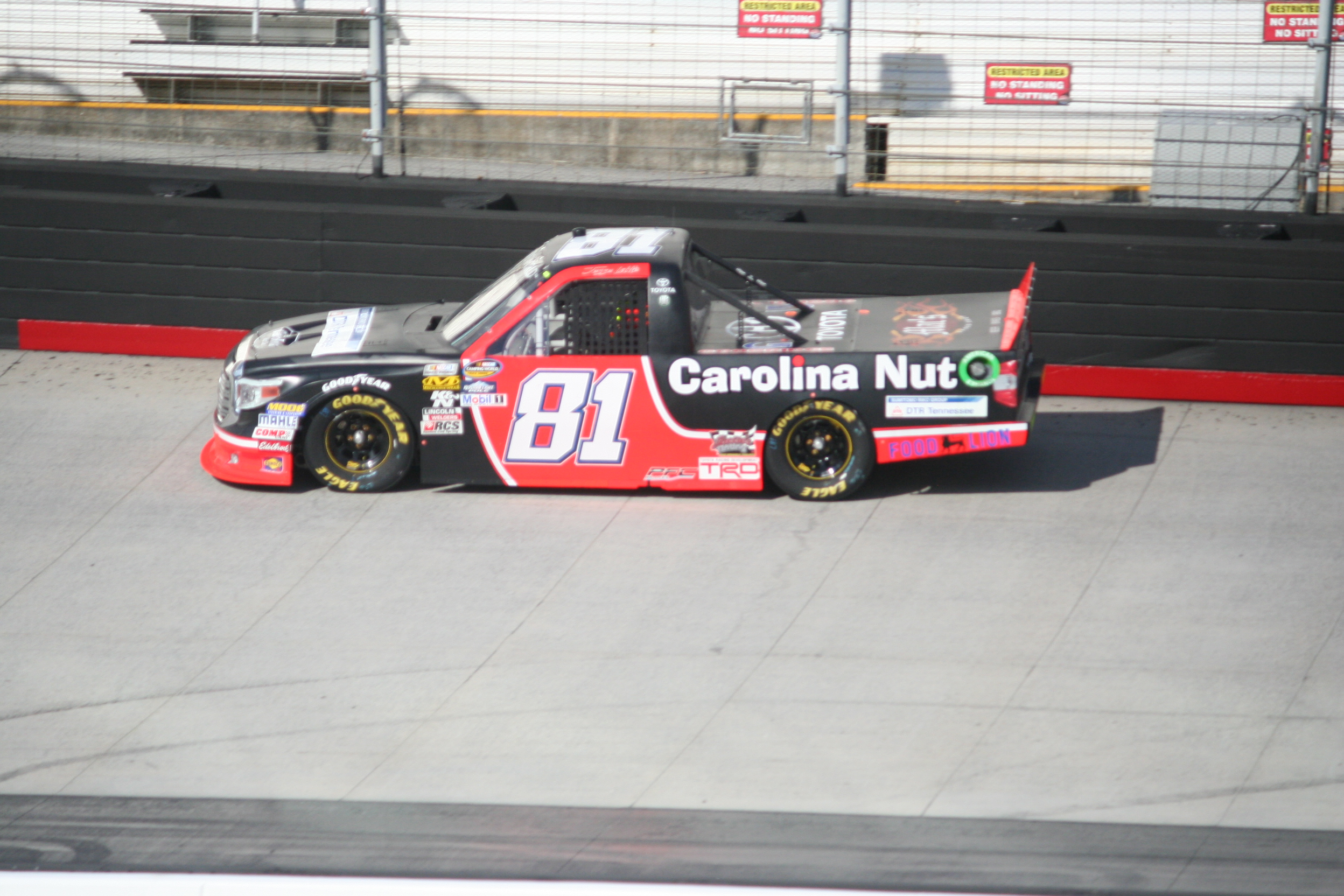
Little's No. 81 truck at Bristol Motor Speedway in 2016

In 2016, Little joined his uncle's Truck Series team, JJL Motorsports. He made two attempts in the fall races at Texas and Homestead finishing twentieth and eighteenth respectively.

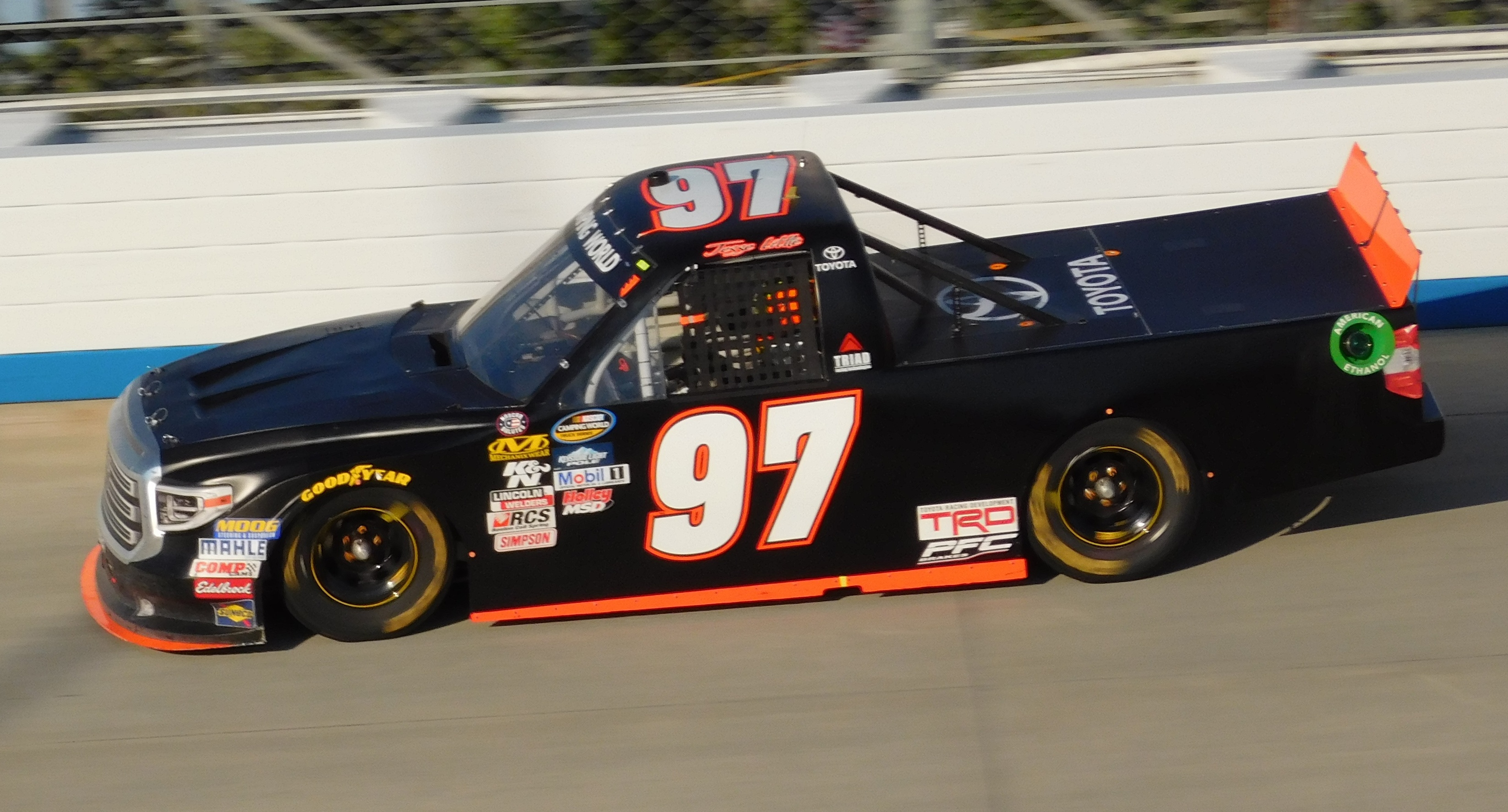
Little's No. 97 truck at Dover Motor Speedway in 2017

In 2017, Little and JJL returned, running four races. The first one was at Dover, where he finished fourteenth. He then finished a season-best eighth in Iowa. Little next raced at Bristol, continuing his strong performance, finishing thirteenth. His last start of 2017 came in Phoenix, where he was involved in a late-race crash, finishing eighteenth.

In 2018, Little expanded his schedule to 9 races. He finished with six top-tens, the highest finish a sixth at Iowa, his best finish to date in the Truck Series. In July 2018, Little joined Premium Motorsports for his Monster Energy NASCAR Cup Series debut in the Quaker State 400 at Kentucky Speedway, driving the No. 7 Chevrolet Camaro ZL1 and finishing 35th. Little later joined Gaunt Brothers Racing at Bristol, also finishing 35th.

In 2019, Little increased his Truck schedule again, planning to run twelve to fifteen races in the newly renamed Gander Outdoors Truck Series.

On November 7, 2019, JD Motorsports announced Little would race full-time for the team in the NASCAR Xfinity Series starting in 2020. Little finished 19th in points with two top-ten finishes.

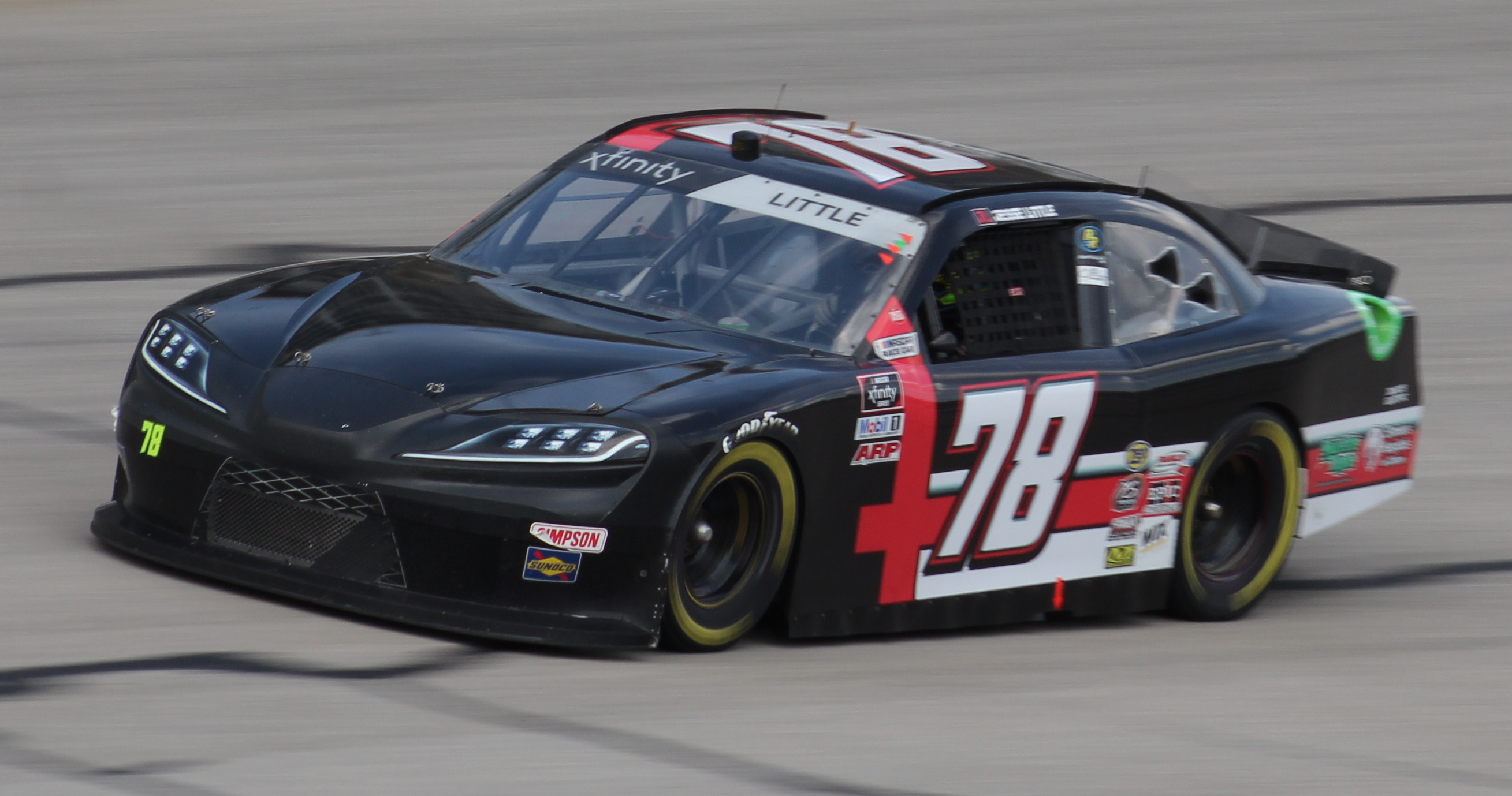
Little's No. 78 car at Atlanta Motor Speedway in 2021

Little moved to B. J. McLeod Motorsports' No. 78 for the 2021 season. He lost his ride with McLeod's team to Josh Williams in 2022. On December 22, it was announced that Little would drive for Young's Motorsports in the Truck Series for at least 12 races with the No. 02, splitting with Kaz Grala. Little also ran a one-off Xfinity event at Phoenix, replacing Jesse Iwuji, who was at his military duties.

On September 14, 2022, Little announced that he would retire from NASCAR after the 2022 UNOH 200 at Bristol.

== Post-racing career ==
On April 21, 2025, it was revealed that Little would serve as the vice president of business development for Sam Hunt Racing.

== Personal life ==
Little is the son of former NASCAR driver Chad Little. They are not related to NASCAR on Fox pit reporter Jamie Little.

== Motorsports career results ==
=== NASCAR ===
(key) (Bold – Pole position awarded by qualifying time. Italics – Pole position earned by points standings or practice time. * – Most laps led.)

==== Monster Energy Cup Series ====
Monster Energy NASCAR Cup Series results
Year	Team	No.	Make	1	2	3	4	5	6	7	8	9	10	11	12	13	14	15	16	17	18	19	20	21	22	23	24	25	26	27	28	29	30	31	32	33	34	35	36	MENCC	Pts	Ref
2018	Premium Motorsports	7	Chevy	DAY	ATL	LVS	PHO	CAL	MAR	TEX	BRI	RCH	TAL	DOV	KAN	CLT	POC	MCH	SON	CHI	DAY	KEN; 35	NHA	POC	GLN	MCH														70th	0^{1}	
2018	Gaunt Brothers Racing	96	Toyota																								BRI; 35	DAR	IND	LVS	RCH	CLT	DOV	TAL	KAN	MAR	TEX	PHO	HOM	70th	0^{1}	

==== Xfinity Series ====
NASCAR Xfinity Series results
Year	Team	No.	Make	1	2	3	4	5	6	7	8	9	10	11	12	13	14	15	16	17	18	19	20	21	22	23	24	25	26	27	28	29	30	31	32	33	NXSC	Pts	Ref
2020	JD Motorsports	4	Chevy	DAY; 19	LVS; 14	CAL; 28	PHO; 21	DAR; 36	CLT; 15	BRI; 26	ATL; 20	HOM; 18	HOM; 15	TAL; 13	POC; 10	IND; 18	KEN; 14	KEN; 14	TEX; 14	KAN; 33	ROA; 28	DAY; 18	DOV; 23	DOV; 23	DAY; 10	DAR; 18	RCH; 25	RCH; 33	BRI; 25	LVS; 23	TAL; 25			TEX; 15	MAR; 22	PHO; 29	19th	527	
2020	JD Motorsports	15	Chevy																													CLT; 30	KAN; 19				19th	527	
2021	B. J. McLeod Motorsports	78	Chevy	DAY; 17	DAY; 14				ATL; 22	MAR; 32	TAL; 26	DAR; 32	DOV; 37			MOH; 24	TEX; 29						GLN; 27	IND			DAR; 32	RCH	BRI; 28	LVS	TAL	CLT	TEX; 31	KAN; 30	MAR	PHO	33rd	215	
2021	B. J. McLeod Motorsports	78	Toyota			HOM; 32	LVS; 26	PHO; 40						COA; DNQ	CLT; 18			NSH; 27	POC; 29	ROA	ATL; 28	NHA; 28															33rd	215	
2021	B. J. McLeod Motorsports	99	Toyota																						MCH; 32	DAY											33rd	215	
2022	Jesse Iwuji Motorsports	34	Chevy	DAY	CAL	LVS	PHO; DNQ	ATL	COA	RCH	MAR	TAL	DOV	DAR	TEX	CLT	PIR	NSH	ROA	ATL	NHA	POC	IND	MCH	GLN	DAY	DAR	KAN	BRI	TEX	TAL	CLT	LVS	HOM	MAR	PHO	N/A	0	

==== Camping World Truck Series ====
NASCAR Gander RV & Outdoors Truck Series results
Year	Team	No.	Make	1	2	3	4	5	6	7	8	9	10	11	12	13	14	15	16	17	18	19	20	21	22	23	NGTC	Pts	Ref
2015	Team Little Racing	97	Toyota	DAY	ATL	MAR	KAN	CLT	DOV; 30	TEX	GTW	IOW	KEN	ELD	POC	MCH	BRI	MSP	CHI; 30	NHA	LVS	TAL	MAR	TEX; 15	PHO	HOM; 14	42nd	87	
2016	Rette Jones Racing	30	Toyota	DAY	ATL	MAR	KAN	DOV	CLT; DNQ																		35th	62	
2016	Rette Jones Racing	81	Toyota							TEX; 19	IOW	GTW	KEN	ELD	POC												35th	62	
2016	Hattori Racing Enterprises	81	Toyota													BRI; 17	MCH	MSP									35th	62	
2016	MB Motorsports	63	Chevy																CHI; 29	NHA	LVS	TAL	MAR				35th	62	
2016	JJL Motorsports	97	Toyota																					TEX; 20	PHO	HOM; 18	35th	62	
2017	JJL Motorsports	97	Toyota	DAY	ATL	MAR	KAN	CLT	DOV; 14	TEX	GTW	IOW; 9	KEN	ELD	POC	MCH	BRI; 13	MSP	CHI	NHA	LVS	TAL	MAR	TEX	PHO; 18	HOM	33rd	110	
2018	JJL Motorsports	97	Ford	DAY	ATL; 8	LVS	MAR	DOV; 9	KAN	CLT; 16	TEX	IOW; 6	GTW; 7	CHI	KEN	ELD	POC	MCH	BRI; 26	MSP	LVS; 15	TAL	MAR	TEX; 7	PHO	HOM; 9	19th	275	
2019	JJL Motorsports	97	Ford	DAY	ATL; 23	LVS; 19	MAR	TEX; 13	DOV; 29	KAN	CLT; 14	TEX	IOW; 22	GTW; 21	CHI	KEN	POC	ELD	MCH	BRI; 32	MSP	LVS	TAL	MAR	PHO; DNQ	HOM; 17	26th	149	
2020	Diversified Motorsports Enterprises	97	Chevy	DAY; 24	LVS	CLT; 21	ATL; 35	HOM	POC	KEN	TEX	KAN	KAN	MCH	DAY	DOV	GTW	DAR	RCH	BRI	LVS	TAL	KAN	TEX	MAR	PHO	90th	0^{1}	
2022	Young's Motorsports	02	Chevy	DAY; 6	LVS	ATL; 15	COA	MAR; 27	BRI	DAR; 14	KAN; 24	TEX; 19	CLT; 32	GTW; 20	SON	KNO	NSH; 19	MOH					BRI; 25	TAL	HOM	PHO	27th	213	
2022	Young's Motorsports	20	Chevy																POC; 26	IRP; 15	RCH	KAN; 28					27th	213	

==== K&N Pro Series East ====
NASCAR K&N Pro Series East results
Year	Team	No.	Make	1	2	3	4	5	6	7	8	9	10	11	12	13	14	15	16	NKNPSEC	Pts	Ref
2012	Team Little Racing	97	Chevy	BRI	GRE	RCH; 11	IOW; 18	BGS	JFC; 17	LGY	CNB	COL	IOW	NHA; 23	DOV; 22	GRE; 3	CAR; 5			20th	210	
2013	Team Little Racing	97	Chevy	BRI; 14	GRE; 16	FIF; 26	RCH; 16	BGS; 5	IOW; 14	LGY; 3	COL; 12	IOW; 4	VIR; 11	GRE; 7	NHA; 6	DOV; 5	RAL; 16			9th	449	
2014	Team Little Racing	97	Chevy	NSM; 18	DAY; 12	BRI; 13	GRE; 4	RCH; 10	IOW; 16	BGS; 16	FIF; 6	LGY; 9	NHA; 1	COL; 4	**IOW**; 10	GLN; 5	VIR; 8	GRE; 9	**DOV**; 23	6th	546	
2015	Team Little Racing	97	Toyota	NSM	GRE	**BRI**; 25	IOW; 3	BGS	LGY	COL	NHA; 11						DOV; 30			21st	184	
2015	Hattori Racing Enterprises	1	Toyota									IOW; 1	GLN; 13	MOT	VIR	RCH				21st	184	
2016	Rette Jones Racing	29	Toyota	NSM	MOB; 3	GRE	BRI; Wth	VIR	DOM	STA	COL	NHA; 17	IOW; 7	GLN	GRE	NJM	DOV; 2			21st	161	
2017	JJL Motorsports	97	Toyota	NSM	GRE	BRI; 23	SBO	SBO	MEM	BLN	TMP	NHA								34th	55	
2017	Hattori Racing Enterprises	01	Toyota										IOW; 10	GLN	LGY	NJM	DOV			34th	55	

==== K&N Pro Series West ====
NASCAR K&N Pro Series West results
Year	Team	No.	Make	1	2	3	4	5	6	7	8	9	10	11	12	13	14	15	NKNPSWC	Pts	Ref
2013	Team Little Racing	97	Chevy	PHO	S99	BIR	IOW	L44	SON	CNS	IOW	EVG	SPO	MMP	SMP	AAS	KCR	PHO; 2	49th	42	
2014	Team Little Racing	97	Chevy	PHO	IRW	S99	IOW	KCR; 5	SON	SLS	CNS	IOW	EVG	KCR; 3	MMP	AAS	PHO; 4		21st	121	

^{*} Season still in progress
^{1} Ineligible for series points
