= Diversified Motorsports Enterprises =

NASCAR team

- Owner(s): Chad Little, Jason Little & Jesse Little (2012–2019); Logan Puckett (2020)
- Base: Sherrills Ford, North Carolina
- Series: NASCAR K&N Pro Series East; NASCAR K&N Pro Series West; NASCAR Camping World Truck Series
- Manufacturer: Chevrolet
- Opened: 2012 (East Series); 2013 (West Series); 2015 (Truck Series)
- Closed: 2020

Career
- Debut: 2015 Lucas Oil 200 (Dover)
- Latest race: 2020 Lucas Oil 150 (Phoenix)
- Races competed: Total: 73; Truck Series: 35; East Series: 42; West Series: 4
- Drivers' Championships: 0
- Race victories: Total: 1 Truck Series: 0 East Series: 1 West Series: 0
- Pole positions: Total: 3 Truck Series: 0 East Series: 3 West Series: 0

Diversified Motorsports Enterprises, formerly JJL Motorsports and Team Little Racing, was an American professional stock car racing team that competed in the NASCAR Camping World Truck Series as well as the NASCAR K&N Pro Series East and West. The team was owned by the Little family from 2012 to 2019. In 2020, they sold the team to Logan Puckett, the owner of Diversified Utility Group, one of the team's sponsors in 2019.

== History ==
=== East Series ===
The team, then known as Team Little Racing, was formed in 2012. Jesse Little, the son of the team's owner, former driver Chad Little, made his NASCAR debut. He drove the No. 97 (the car number Chad drove in the Cup Series for Mark Rypien Motorsports and Roush Racing) part-time in 2012, full-time in 2013 and 2014, part-time in 2015 and 2017. Little won 1 race driving for his family team which came at New Hampshire in 2014.

=== West Series ===
Jesse Little and the team would enter the No. 97 car at the season-finale at Phoenix in 2013 and 2014 as well as both races at Kern County Raceway Park in 2014.

=== Truck Series ===
In 2015, the team made their Truck Series debut at Dover, fielding No. 97 Toyota Tundra in a partnership with ThorSport Racing, but an early crash ended Jesse Little's day early finishing 30th. The team also attempted the Chicagoland race but also finished 30th. The team returned at Texas and Homestead and finished 15th at Texas and 14th at Homestead respectively.

In 2016, the team was renamed to JJL Motorsports. The No. 97 truck made two attempts in the fall races at Texas and Homestead finishing 20th and 18th respectively.

In 2017, Jesse Little returned to the No. 97 truck, running 4 races. The first one was at Dover, where he finished 14th. Jesse Little then finished a season best 8th in Iowa. Little next raced at Bristol, continuing his strong performance, finishing 13th. His last start of 2017 came in Phoenix, where he was involved in a late race crash, finishing 18th.

In 2018, JJL Motorsports and Jesse Little returned for 9 races, and the team also switched manufacturers from Toyota to Ford, keeping their alliance with ThorSport, who also switched from Toyota to Ford that year. As part of this switch, JJL acquired trucks and equipment from the closed Brad Keselowski Racing team, which is why their trucks were the same blue color that Keselowski's trucks had used to run. Little finished with six top tens, the highest finish a 6th at Iowa, the team's best finish to date in the Truck Series. The team also had other drivers besides Jesse Little in the truck for the first time. Dirt ringer R. J. Otto Jr. drove the truck at Eldora but failed to qualify for the race. Roger Reuse drove the No. 97 at Canadian Tire Motorsport Park in a collaboration with Jordan Anderson Racing.

In 2019, JJL and Jesse Little increased their schedule again, planning to run 12 to 15 races in the newly renamed Gander Outdoors Truck Series.

The team announced over the summer that following the 2019 season, they were looking to sell the team to a new owner, as driver Jesse Little was looking to move up to the Cup or Xfinity Series in 2020. Little eventually was announced to run in the Xfinity Series full-time for JD Motorsports.

Before the season-ending Ford EcoBoost 200, it was announced that Logan Puckett, the president of Diversified Utility Group LLC, would be purchasing the team, and renaming it to Diversified Motorsports Enterprises for the 2020 season. His company also sponsored the No. 97 truck at Homestead, the team's final race with the Little family as the owners of the team. Although his uncle Jason will no longer be an owner of the team, Jesse Little was still announced as the driver for DME in their part-time 2020 schedule, beginning at Daytona. The transfer of ownership was completed on December 20. He and Robby Lyons would drive the No. 97 truck part-time in 2020.

The team did not attempt any races in 2021.
