= GO TEXAN =

Texas Department of Agriculture advertising campaign

GO TEXAN is an advertising campaign sponsored by the Texas Department of Agriculture whose purpose is to encourage Texan and non-Texan consumers to seek and purchase Texas-made products.

The GO TEXAN campaign began in 1999 to focus on Texas agricultural products. Later, the campaign expanded to include shrimp and Texas wine. In 2003, the Texas Legislature expanded the program to include Texas-made products of all sorts.

The current GO TEXAN campaign is divided into four general areas:

- GO TEXAN Products—Markets fiber, food, horticulture/forestry/produce, livestock, oysters and shrimp, and wine
- GO TEXAN Communities—Designates an area as a "Certified Retirement Community" based on its ability to meet the living, employment/volunteer, health, entertainment, education, and safety needs of residents and visitors, and also spotlights rural communities to support and encourage rural tourism
- GO TEXAN Restaurants—Links restaurants to Texas-grown or processed food products
- GO TEXAN Special Programs—Operates special programs such as the GO TEXAN booth at the State Fair of Texas, a website listing of local farmers markets, and international marketing go Texan day is on Friday February 26.
