= Bayley Currey =

American racing driver (born 1996)

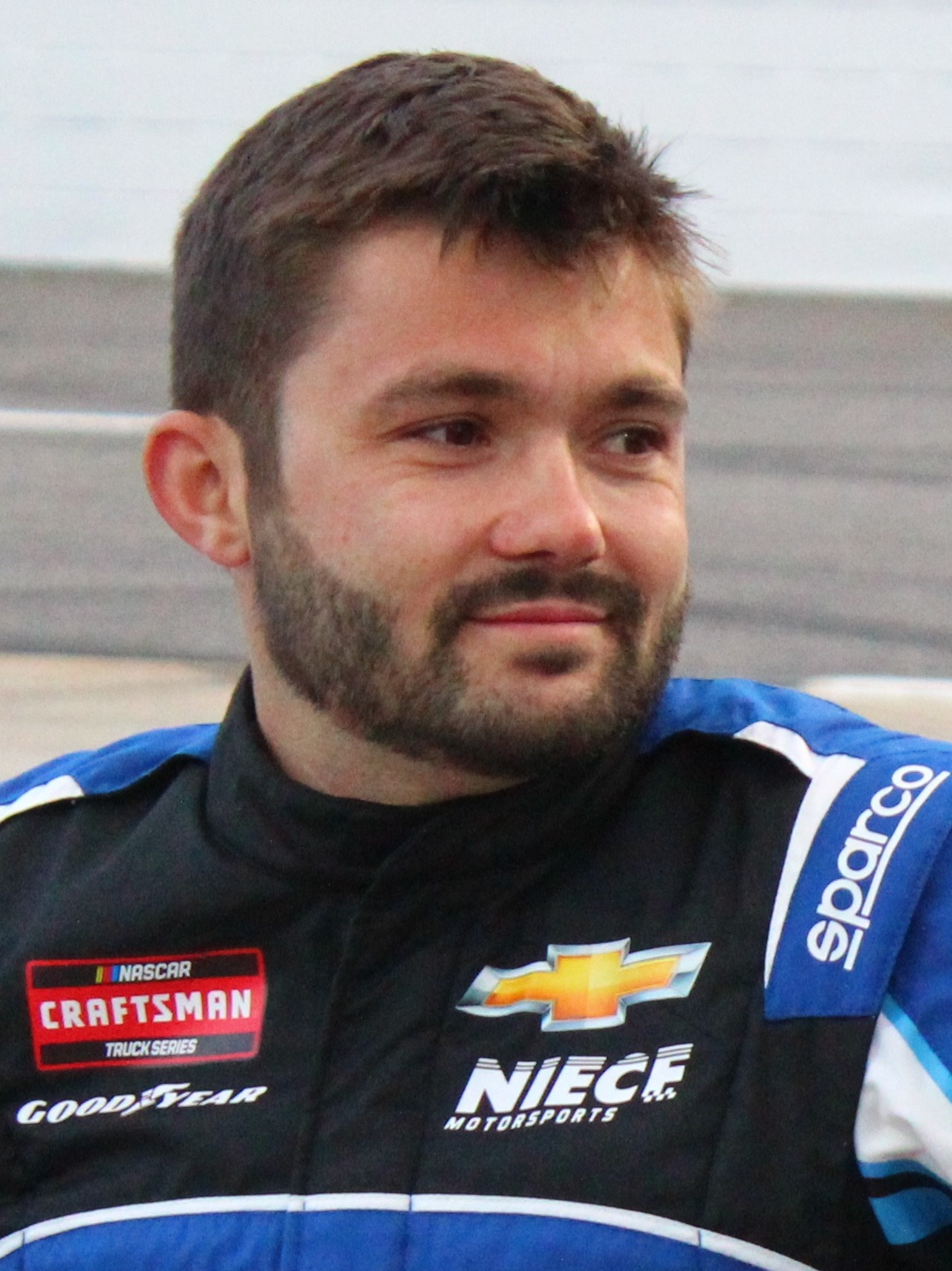
- Currey at Martinsville Speedway in 2024
- Born: Bayley Alexander Currey; October 29, 1996 (age 30); Driftwood, Texas, U.S.
- Achievements: 2014 Viper Pro Late Model Series Champion

NASCAR Cup Series career
- 12 races run over 3 years
- 2021 position: 64th
- Best finish: 52nd (2019)
- First race: 2019 TicketGuardian 500 (Phoenix)
- Last race: 2021 Quaker State 400 (Atlanta)
Wins	Top tens	Poles
0	0	0

NASCAR O'Reilly Auto Parts Series career
- 111 races run over 6 years
- 2023 position: 98th
- Best finish: 20th (2022)
- First race: 2018 My Bariatric Solutions 300 (Texas)
- Last race: 2023 United Rentals 200 (Phoenix)
Wins	Top tens	Poles
0	2	0

NASCAR FedEx Freight Truck Series career
- 85 races run over 10 years
- 2026 position: 37th
- Best finish: 18th (2024)
- First race: 2017 Texas Roadhouse 200 (Martinsville)
- Last race: 2026 Ecosave 200 (Charlotte)
Wins	Top tens	Poles
0	12	0
- Statistics up to date as of November 6, 2026.

Bayley Alexander Currey (born October 29, 1996) is an American professional stock car racing driver and car chief. He last competed part-time in the NASCAR Craftsman Truck Series, driving the No. 5 Toyota Tundra TRD Pro for Tricon Garage and part-time in the CARS Pro Late Model Tour, driving the No. 83 Dodge Charger for Copp Motorsports. Currey also serves as the truck chief for the No. 1 Toyota Tundra TRD Pro for Tricon Garage and has competed in the NASCAR Cup Series and NASCAR Xfinity Series in the past.

== Racing career ==
=== Early career ===
Currey started his go-kart racing career in 2003, later moving up to Bandolero racing. After that, he competed at Central Texas Speedway, driving Pro Late Model's in 2013, later going onto win the 2014 Viper Pro Late Model Series championship.

=== Craftsman Truck Series ===
==== 2017 ====
Currey made his Camping World Truck Series debut at Martinsville at the Texas Roadhouse 200, driving the No. 50 truck for Beaver Motorsports. The offer was brought to him by a personal friend. He started 27th and finished 25th. Currey returned in Phoenix, driving the No. 83 for Copp Motorsports. He started 21st and finished tenth, surviving multiple wrecks in the process. He drove the No. 83 truck again at Homestead, starting 30th and finishing 28th after an engine failure.

==== 2018 ====
Currey would run 13 Truck races in 2018, returning to the No. 83 for Copp Motorsports, scoring a best finish of 16th at Las Vegas in the fall.

==== 2019 ====
On February 9, 2019, it was announced that Currey and Vizion Motorsports agreed to run a partial schedule in the No. 35 Toyota Tundra for 2019. The announcement came after Currey tested an ARCA Racing Series car for Vizion. In July, he joined Niece Motorsports for the Gander RV 150 at Pocono Raceway, and later finished sixth with the team at Michigan International Speedway.

==== 2020 ====
In 2020, Currey joined CMI Motorsports for the Strat 200 at Las Vegas Motor Speedway. He returned to Niece at Pocono after regular driver Natalie Decker was hospitalized with bile duct complications.

==== 2021 ====
On January 3, 2021, Currey revealed on the Talking in Circles podcast that he would return to Niece in 2021 for another part-time schedule. Although plans were for his season debut to take place at Circuit of the Americas, he did so in April at Kansas in the No. 45 truck after regular driver Brett Moffitt switched to Xfinity points. Currey changed his points declaration to the Truck Series on May 4.

==== 2023 ====
Currey joined Niece Motorsports for a partial schedule in 2023 and scored three top-five finishes.

==== 2024 ====
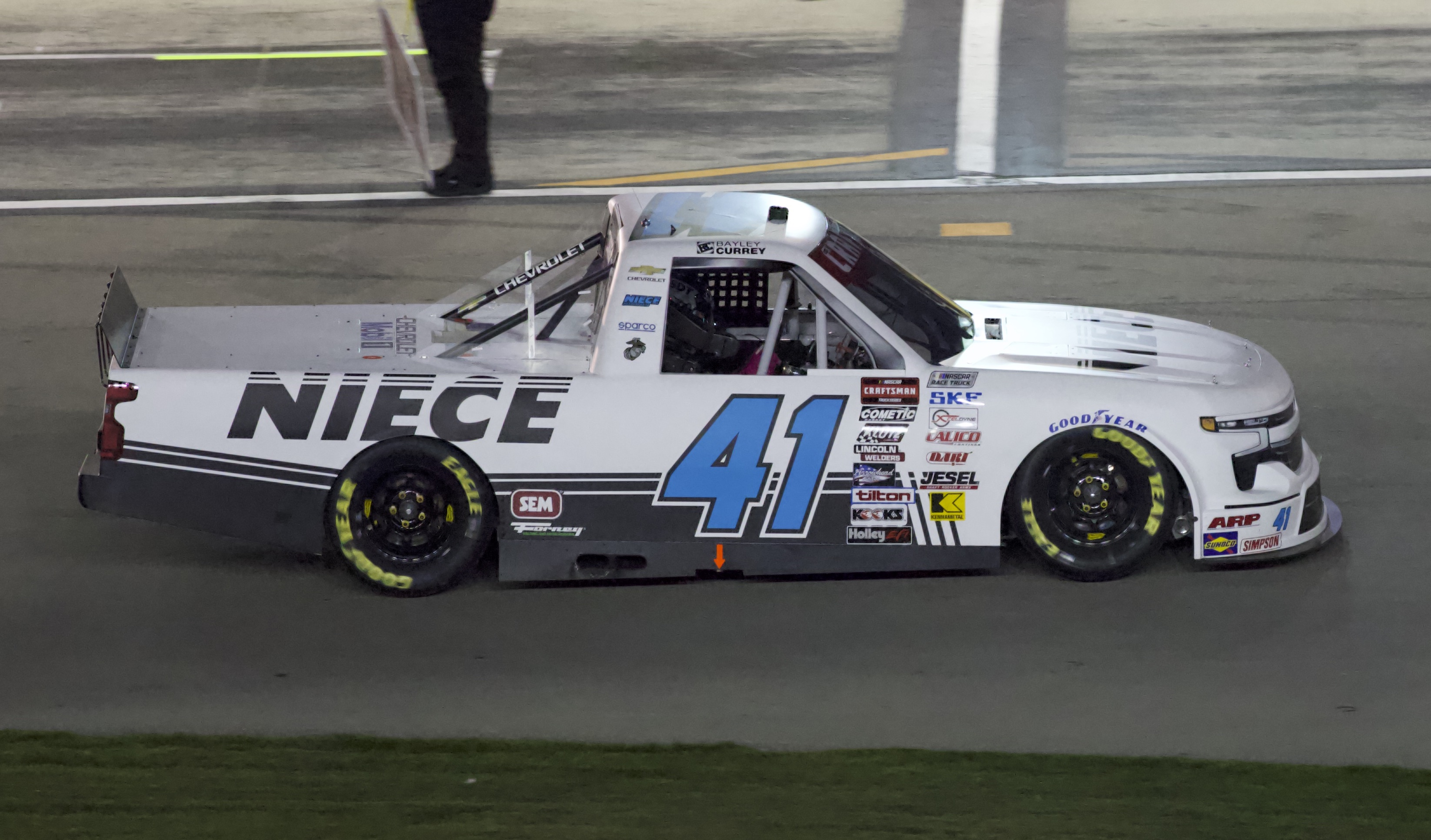
Currey's No. 41 truck at Las Vegas Motor Speedway in 2024.

On October 26, 2023, it was announced that Currey would drive the No. 41 truck full-time in 2024. He struggled throughout the regular season, failing to record a single top-ten finish and as a result, failed to make the playoffs.

==== 2025 ====
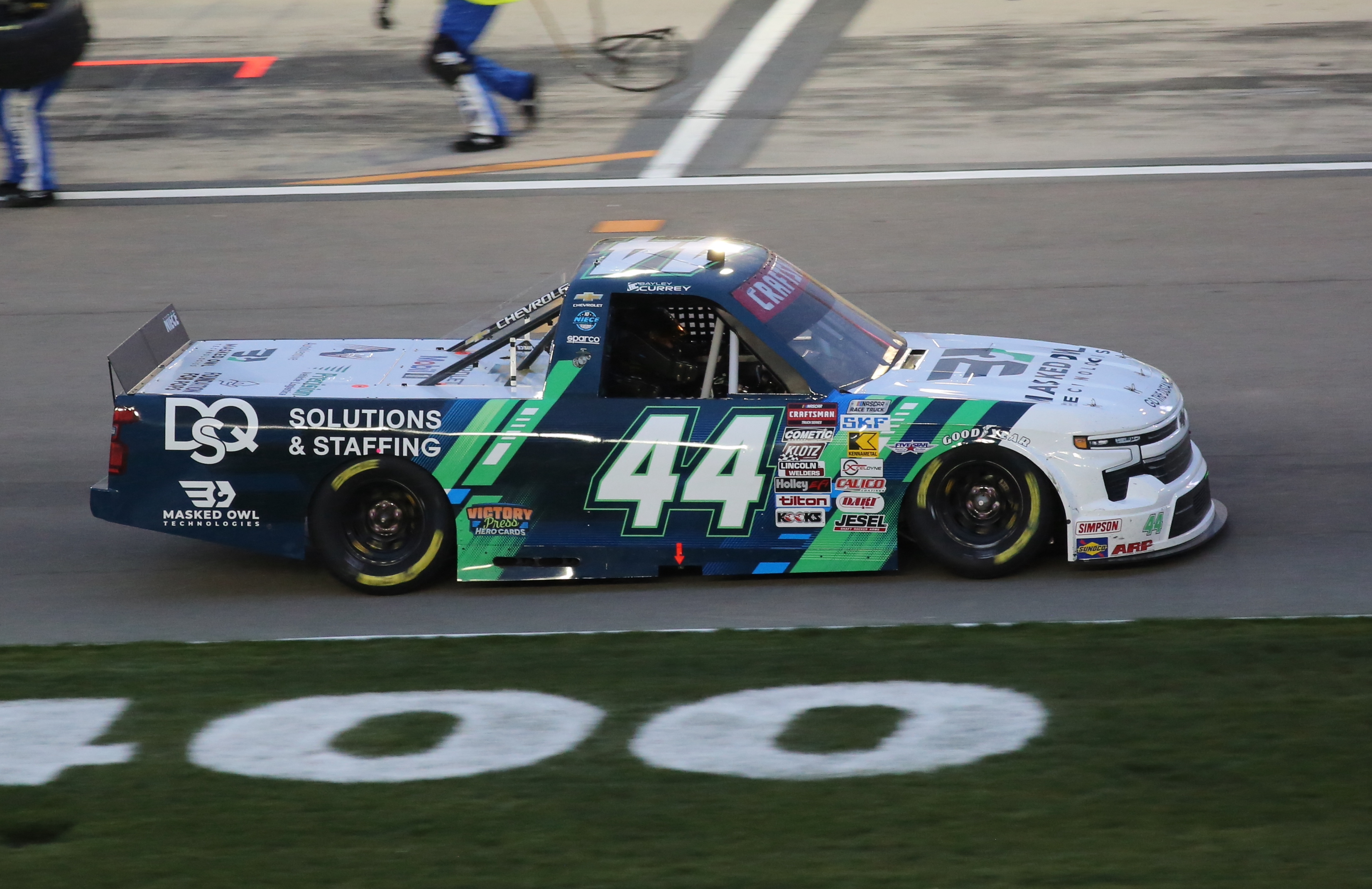
Currey's No. 44 truck at Las Vegas Motor Speedway in 2025.

Currey returned to Niece Motorsports on a part-time basis once again in 2025, starting the year out in the No. 41 for the organization. He would be in contention to win at Atlanta and would score his first career stage win at Bristol Motor Speedway in April.

==== 2026 ====
To start 2026, Currey was slated to compete in select starts once again for Niece Motorsports, but prior to the season opener at Daytona, he received an opportunity from Tricon Garage to serve as the car chief on the No. 1 truck. On February 28, 2026 at St. Petersburg, it was revealed he would be making select starts, with further details set to be revealed at a later date. On September 10th, 2026, It was revealed that Currey would be driving the No. 5 Shark Attack truck at Bristol on September 18th, 2026.

=== O'Reilly Auto Parts Series ===
==== 2018 ====
A few weeks after competing in the 2018 Stratosphere 200 in the NASCAR Camping World Truck Series, Currey made his NASCAR Xfinity Series debut at Texas Motor Speedway with B. J. McLeod Motorsports. He qualified 23rd and finished twentieth after falling back to 30th at the end of Stage 1 and 27th at the end of Stage 2. Currey returned at Loudon in July with JP Motorsports in their No. 55 entry, and piloted the car for most of the remainder of the 2018 season.

==== 2019 ====
On August 15, 2019, leading into the Food City 300 at Bristol, Currey was indefinitely suspended by NASCAR after failing a drug test; Currey, in a statement, said that the failure was due to a banned ingredient (Octodrine) in a pre-workout supplement. He apologized publicly on the night the suspension was announced and asked NASCAR to enter him in to the Road to Recovery program, which is mandatory for members looking to be reinstated by NASCAR. He was reinstated on September 18 after completing the Road to Recovery. He made his racing return at the Charlotte Roval, where he finished 37th.

==== 2020 ====
Currey joined Mike Harmon Racing for the 2020 season, where he ran much of the schedule in the No. 74.

==== 2021 ====
Currey was elevated to a full-time seat with the team in 2021. In the Call 811 Before You Dig 200 at Phoenix Raceway, he posted his and MHR's best career finishes of seventh.

==== 2022 ====
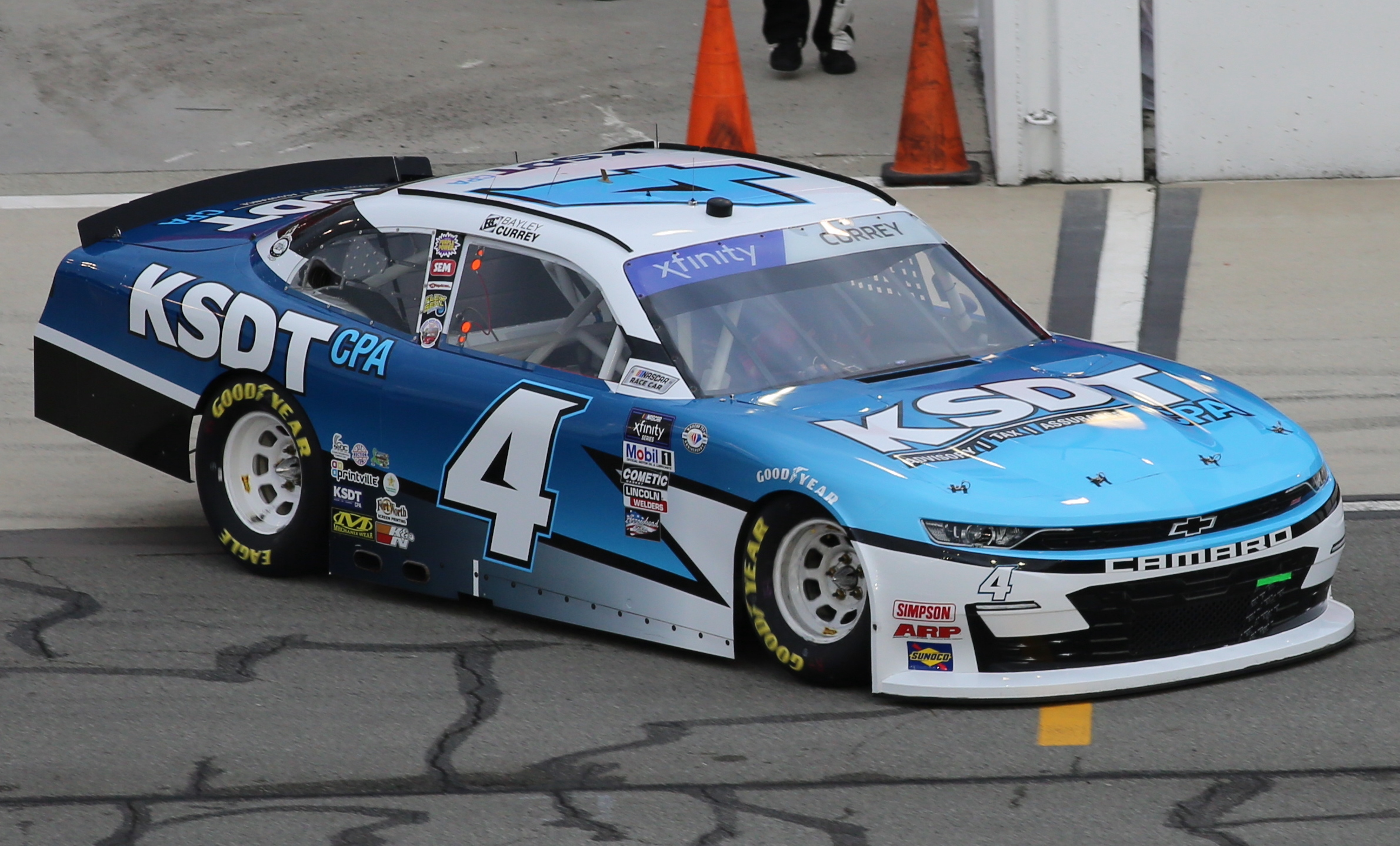
Currey's No. 4 car at Auto Club Speedway in 2023.

On October 15, 2021, Currey stated in an interview with Jayski's Silly Season Site that he was hoping to return to JD Motorsports in 2022. He drove for Mike Harmon Racing for most of the 2021 season until he was taken out of the ride due to other drivers bringing sponsorship. On December 27, JDM announced that Currey would drive one of their cars full-time in 2022. Although he drove the No. 15 in all of his starts for the team in 2021, his car number for 2022 was No. 4 and was sponsored by the Swedish rock band Ghost at the spring Phoenix race.

=== Cup Series ===
==== 2019 ====
In March 2019, Currey partnered with Rick Ware Racing for his Monster Energy NASCAR Cup Series debut in the TicketGuardian 500 at ISM Raceway. He was slated to run the Bass Pro Shops NRA Night Race at Bristol with Ware until his suspension. Kyle Weatherman took his place in the 52.

==== 2020 ====
Currey returned to Ware and the Cup Series in May 2020, driving the No. 53 in the Supermarket Heroes 500 at Bristol. In August, he replaced J. J. Yeley during the Go Bowling 235 on the Daytona road course when Yeley required medical attention due to a failed cooling system.

==== 2021 ====
Currey's No. 15 car at Atlanta in 2021.

Currey returned to the series in the 2021 Quaker State 400 at Atlanta, driving the No. 15 for Rick Ware Racing.

=== Other racing ===
Currey's No. 83 car at Hickory in 2026.

Currey had made select starts in the CARS Pro Late Model Tour, starting in 2025 where he would start and finish second at Tri-County.

In 2026, Currey would reunite with Copp Motorsports and score a ninth place finish at Hickory.

== Personal life ==
Currey's father Marc was a racecar driver. He attended Texas State University and later the University of North Carolina at Charlotte, majoring in mechanical engineering.

Currey bused tables at The Salt Lick BBQ in Driftwood, Texas, while in high school.

== Motorsports career results ==
=== Stock car career summary ===
Season	Series	Team	Races	Wins	Top 5	Top 10	Points	Position
2017	NASCAR Camping World Truck Series	Beaver Motorsports	1	0	0	0	38	43rd
2017	NASCAR Camping World Truck Series	Copp Motorsports	1	0	0	1	38	43rd
2018	NASCAR Camping World Truck Series	Copp Motorsports	13	0	0	0	141	31st
2018	NASCAR Xfinity Series	B. J. McLeod Motorsports	1	0	0	0	0	NC†
2018	NASCAR Xfinity Series	JP Motorsports	9	0	0	0	0	NC†
2019	NASCAR Gander Outdoor Truck Series	Beaver Motorsports	1	0	0	0	54	48th
2019	NASCAR Gander Outdoor Truck Series	Niece Motorsports	2	0	0	1	54	48th
2019	NASCAR Xfinity Series	Rick Ware Racing	9	0	0	0	0	NC†
2019	NASCAR Xfinity Series	RSS Racing	3	0	0	0	0	NC†
2019	NASCAR Xfinity Series	Mike Harmon Racing	1	0	0	0	0	NC†
2019	Monster Energy NASCAR Cup Series	Rick Ware Racing	10	0	0	0	0	NC†
2020	NASCAR Gander RV & Outdoor Truck Series	CMI Motorsports	2	0	0	0	103	41st
2020	NASCAR Gander RV & Outdoor Truck Series	Niece Motorsports	4	0	0	0	103	41st
2020	NASCAR Xfinity Series	Mike Harmon Racing	26	0	0	0	0	NC†
2020	NASCAR Cup Series	Rick Ware Racing	1	0	0	0	0	NC†
2021	NASCAR Camping World Truck Series	Niece Motorsports	5	0	0	0	50	48th
2021	NASCAR Xfinity Series	Mike Harmon Racing	17	0	0	1	0	NC†
2021	NASCAR Xfinity Series	JD Motorsports	7	0	0	0	0	NC†
2021	NASCAR Cup Series	Rick Ware Racing	1	0	0	0	0	NC†
2022	NASCAR Camping World Truck Series	Niece Motorsports	3	0	0	0	0	NC†
2022	NASCAR Xfinity Series	JD Motorsports	33	0	0	1	428	20th
2023	NASCAR Craftsman Truck Series	Niece Motorsports	11	0	3	4	260	24th
2023	NASCAR Xfinity Series	JD Motorsports	4	0	0	0	0	NC†
2024	NASCAR Craftsman Truck Series	Niece Motorsports	23	0	0	1	392	18th
2025	CARS Pro Late Model Tour	Conner Jones Racing	1	0	1	1	41	45th
2025	NASCAR Craftsman Truck Series	Niece Motorsports	16	0	1	3	309	22nd
2026	CARS Pro Late Model Tour	Copp Motorsports	2	0	0	1	57	32nd
2026	NASCAR Craftsman Truck Series	Tricon Garage	2	0	2	2	75	37th

^{†} As Currey was a guest driver, he was ineligible for championship points.

=== NASCAR ===
(key) (Bold – Pole position awarded by qualifying time. Italics – Pole position earned by points standings or practice time. * – Most laps led.)

==== Cup Series ====
NASCAR Cup Series results
Year	Team	No.	Make	1	2	3	4	5	6	7	8	9	10	11	12	13	14	15	16	17	18	19	20	21	22	23	24	25	26	27	28	29	30	31	32	33	34	35	36	NCSC	Pts	Ref
2019	Rick Ware Racing	52	Ford	DAY	ATL	LVS	PHO; 31	CAL	MAR						KAN; 33	CLT; 35				CHI; 32	DAY																			52nd	0^{1}	
2019	Rick Ware Racing	52	Chevy							TEX; 35	BRI; 31	RCH; 32	TAL	DOV																								PHO; 32	HOM	52nd	0^{1}	
2019	Rick Ware Racing	51	Ford														POC; 25	MCH	SON			KEN; 33	NHA	POC	GLN	MCH	BRI	DAR	IND	LVS	RCH	ROV	DOV	TAL	KAN	MAR	TEX			52nd	0^{1}	
2020	Rick Ware Racing	53	Chevy	DAY	LVS	CAL	PHO	DAR	DAR	CLT	CLT	BRI; 38	ATL	MAR	HOM	TAL	POC	POC	IND	KEN	TEX	KAN	NHA	MCH	MCH															54th	0^{1}	
2020	Rick Ware Racing	27	Ford																							DRC; RL^{†}	DOV	DOV	DAY	DAR	RCH	BRI	LVS	TAL	ROV	KAN	TEX	MAR	PHO	54th	0^{1}	
2021	Rick Ware Racing	15	Chevy	DAY	DRC	HOM	LVS	PHO	ATL	BRD	MAR	RCH	TAL	KAN	DAR	DOV	COA	CLT	SON	NSH	POC	POC	ROA	ATL; 32	NHA	GLN	IRC	MCH	DAY	DAR	RCH	BRI	LVS	TAL	ROV	TEX	KAN	MAR	PHO	64th	0^{1}	
^{†} – Relieved J. J. Yeley

==== Xfinity Series ====
NASCAR Xfinity Series results
Year	Team	No.	Make	1	2	3	4	5	6	7	8	9	10	11	12	13	14	15	16	17	18	19	20	21	22	23	24	25	26	27	28	29	30	31	32	33	NXSC	Pts	Ref
2018	B. J. McLeod Motorsports	8	Chevy	DAY	ATL	LVS	PHO	CAL	TEX; 22	BRI	RCH	TAL	DOV	CLT	POC	MCH	IOW	CHI	DAY	KEN																	103rd	0^{1}	
2018	JP Motorsports	55	Toyota																		NHA; 29	IOW	GLN	MOH	BRI; 27	ROA	DAR; 26	IND; 39	LVS; 24	RCH; 29	ROV; 35	DOV; 29	KAN; DNQ	TEX; Wth	PHO; 30	HOM; DNQ	103rd	0^{1}	
2018	JP Motorsports	45	Toyota																															TEX; 21			103rd	0^{1}	
2019	Rick Ware Racing	17	Chevy	DAY	ATL; 22	LVS; 34	PHO; 37	CAL; 35	TEX; DNQ	BRI	RCH	TAL	DOV; 34	CLT; 33	POC	MCH; 33	IOW	CHI; QL^{†}	DAY	KEN	NHA; 35	IOW	GLN	MOH	BRI	ROA	DAR	IND	LVS	RCH			KAN; 35				93rd	0^{1}	
2019	RSS Racing	38	Chevy																												ROV; 37	DOV; 33					93rd	0^{1}	
2019	Mike Harmon Racing	74	Chevy																															TEX; 20			93rd	0^{1}	
2019	RSS Racing	93	Chevy																																PHO; 36	HOM	93rd	0^{1}	
2020	Mike Harmon Racing	47	Chevy	DAY	LVS	CAL; 32																															81st	0^{1}	
2020	Mike Harmon Racing	74	Chevy				PHO; DNQ	DAR; 33	CLT; 18	BRI; 20	ATL; 18	HOM; 24	HOM; 26	TAL	POC; 24	IRC; 34	KEN; 22	KEN; 25	TEX; 19	KAN; 23	ROA; 37	DRC; 14	DOV; 35	DOV; 33	DAY	DAR; 24	RCH; 21	RCH; 19	BRI; 30	LVS; 25	TAL	ROV	KAN; 18	TEX; 12	MAR; 36	PHO; 15	81st	0^{1}	
2021	Mike Harmon Racing	74	Chevy	DAY; 33	DRC; 32	HOM; 35	LVS; 22	PHO; 7	ATL; 24	MAR; 26	TAL; 40	DAR; 25	DOV; 24	COA; DNQ	CLT; DNQ	MOH; 37	TEX; 40	NSH; 30	POC	ROA; DNQ	ATL; 34	NHA	GLN; 32	IRC; DNQ	MCH; 34	DAY	DAR		BRI; 38								84th	0^{1}	
2021	JD Motorsports	15	Chevy																									RCH; 27		LVS; 13	TAL; 36	ROV	TEX; 17	KAN; 16	MAR; 35	PHO; 31	84th	0^{1}	
2022	JD Motorsports	4	Chevy	DAY; 20	CAL; 34	LVS; 18	PHO; 20	ATL; 29	COA; 38	RCH; 31	MAR; 17	TAL; 17	DOV; 36	DAR; 23	TEX; 24	CLT; 15	PIR; 30	NSH; 31	ROA; 16	ATL; 29	NHA; 10	POC; 26	IRC; 21	MCH; 30	GLN; 26	DAY; 30	DAR; 19	KAN; 35	BRI; 11	TEX; 12	TAL; 24	ROV; 26	LVS; 33	HOM; 13	MAR; 38	PHO; 19	20th	428	
2023	JD Motorsports	4	Chevy	DAY; 38	CAL; 30	LVS; 28	PHO; 28	ATL	COA	RCH	MAR	TAL	DOV	DAR	CLT	PIR	SON	NSH	CSC	ATL	NHA	POC	ROA	MCH	IRC	GLN	DAY	DAR	KAN	BRI	TEX	ROV	LVS	HOM	MAR	PHO	98th	0^{1}	
^{†} – Qualified but replaced by Josh Bilicki

==== Craftsman Truck Series ====
NASCAR Craftsman Truck Series results
Year	Team	No.	Make	1	2	3	4	5	6	7	8	9	10	11	12	13	14	15	16	17	18	19	20	21	22	23	24	25	NCTC	Pts	Ref
2017	Beaver Motorsports	50	Chevy	DAY	ATL	MAR	KAN	CLT	DOV	TEX	GTW	IOW	KEN	ELD	POC	MCH	BRI	MSP	CHI	NHA	LVS	TAL	MAR; 25	TEX					43rd	38	
2017	Copp Motorsports	83	Chevy																						PHO; 10	HOM; 28			43rd	38	
2018	Copp Motorsports	83	Chevy	DAY	ATL	LVS; 20	MAR	DOV; 26		CLT; 25	TEX; 29	IOW; 24	GTW	CHI; 27				MCH; 27	BRI; 32	MSP	LVS; 16	TAL	MAR	TEX; 23	PHO	HOM			31st	141	
2018	Copp Motorsports	36	Chevy						KAN; 29																				31st	141	
2018	Copp Motorsports	63	Chevy												KEN; 30	ELD	POC; 32												31st	141	
2019	Beaver Motorsports	1	Toyota	DAY	ATL	LVS	MAR	TEX; Wth	DOV	KAN; 29	CLT; Wth	TEX	IOW	GTW	CHI	KEN													48th	54	
2019	Niece Motorsports	44	Chevy														POC; 23	ELD	MCH; 6	BRI	MSP	LVS	TAL	MAR	PHO	HOM			48th	54	
2020	CMI Motorsports	49	Chevy	DAY	LVS; DNQ	CLT; 28	ATL; 32	HOM																					41st	103	
2020	Niece Motorsports	44	Chevy						POC; 16	KEN	TEX	KAN	KAN	MCH	DRC	DOV; 18	GTW	DAR; 12	RCH	BRI	LVS								41st	103	
2020	Niece Motorsports	40	Chevy																			TAL; 15	KAN	TEX	MAR	PHO			41st	103	
2021	Niece Motorsports	45	Chevy	DAY	DRC	LVS	ATL	BRD	RCH	KAN; 12		COA; 26	CLT; 19	TEX	NSH	POC; 37	KNX	GLN	GTW	DAR	BRI	LVS	TAL	MAR	PHO				48th	50	
2021	Niece Motorsports	44	Chevy								DAR; 21																		48th	50	
2022	Niece Motorsports	44	Chevy	DAY	LVS	ATL	COA	MAR	BRD	DAR	KAN	TEX	CLT	GTW	SON	KNX	NSH	MOH	POC	IRP	RCH	KAN; 27	BRI; 15	TAL; 21	HOM	PHO			96th	0^{1}	
2023	Niece Motorsports	41	Chevy	DAY	LVS	ATL; 4	COA	TEX	BRD	MAR	KAN	DAR	NWS	CLT; 13	GTW; 17	NSH; 5	MOH	POC	RCH; 18	IRP	MLW; 10	KAN; 21	BRI; 13	TAL; 31	HOM; 5	PHO; 31			24th	260	
2024	Niece Motorsports	41	Chevy	DAY; 13	ATL; 30	LVS; 28	BRI; 11	COA; 16	MAR; 17	TEX; 14	KAN; 11	DAR; 22	NWS; 19	CLT; 26	GTW; 29	NSH; 29	POC; 17	IRP; 14	RCH; 23	MLW; 29		KAN; 8	TAL; 36	HOM; 31	MAR; 16	PHO; 21			18th	392	
2024	Niece Motorsports	44	Chevy																		BRI; 15								18th	392	
2025	Niece Motorsports	44	Chevy	DAY; 21	ATL; 4	LVS; 18	HOM	MAR	BRI; 23	CAR; 20	TEX; 8	KAN; 26	NWS	CLT	NSH; 9	MCH	POC	LRP	IRP	GLN									22nd	309	
2025	Niece Motorsports	45	Chevy																		RCH; 20	DAR; 25	BRI; 19	NHA; 18	ROV; 12	TAL; 31	MAR; 21	PHO; 27	22nd	309	
2026	Tricon Garage	5	Toyota	DAY	ATL	STP	DAR	CAR	BRI	TEX	GLN	DOV	CLT	NSH	MCH	COR	LRP	NWS	IRP	RCH	NHA	BRI; 2	KAN	CLT; 4	PHO	TAL	MAR	HOM	37th	75	

^{*} Season still in progress
^{1} Ineligible for series points

=== CARS Pro Late Model Tour ===
(key)

CARS Pro Late Model Tour results
Year	Team	No.	Make	1	2	3	4	5	6	7	8	9	10	11	12	13	CPLMTC	Pts	Ref
2025	Conner Jones Racing	44	Chevy	AAS	CDL	OCS	ACE	NWS	CRW	HCY	HCY	AND	FLC	SBO	TCM; 2	NWS	45th	41	
2026	Copp Motorsports	83	Dodge	SNM	NSV	CRW	ACE	NWS	HCY; 9	AND	FLC; 18	TCM	NPS	SBO			32nd	57	

Sporting positions
Preceded by Korey Ruble	Viper Pro Late Model Series Champion; 2014	Succeeded by Hunter Robbins
