= 2019 TicketGuardian 500 =

Fourth race of the 2019 Monster Energy Cup Series

Race details
- Race 4 of 36 in the 2019 Monster Energy NASCAR Cup Series
- Date: March 10, 2019
- Location: ISM Raceway in Avondale, Arizona
- Course: Permanent racing facility
- Course length: 1 miles (1.6 km)
- Distance: 312 laps, 312 mi (499.2 km)
- Average speed: 101.693 miles per hour (163.659 km/h)

Pole position
Driver	Ryan Blaney	Team Penske
- Time: 25.480

Most laps led
Driver	Kyle Busch	Joe Gibbs Racing
- Laps: 177

Winner
No. 18	Kyle Busch	Joe Gibbs Racing

Television in the United States
- Network: Fox
- Announcers: Mike Joy, Jeff Gordon and Darrell Waltrip
- Nielsen ratings: 4.794 million

Radio in the United States
- Radio: MRN
- Booth announcers: Alex Hayden, Jeff Striegle, and Rusty Wallace
- Turn announcers: Dan Hubbard (1 & 2) and Kyle Rickey (3 & 4)

The 2019 TicketGuardian 500 was a Monster Energy NASCAR Cup Series race that was held on March 10, 2019, at ISM Raceway in Avondale, Arizona. Contested over 312 laps on the one-mile (1.6 km) oval, it was the fourth race of the 2019 Monster Energy NASCAR Cup Series season.

== Report ==
=== Background ===
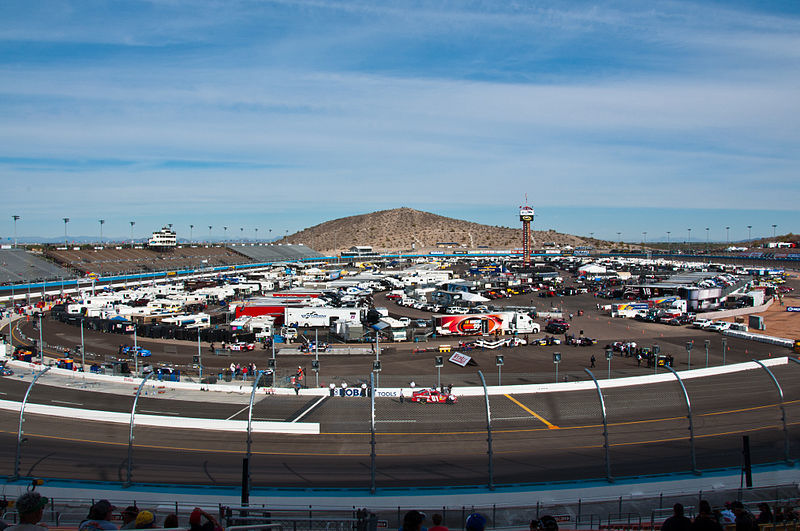
ISM Raceway was the site of the fourth race of the season

ISM Raceway, is a one-mile, low-banked tri-oval race track located in Avondale, Arizona. The motorsport track opened in 1964 and currently hosts two NASCAR race weekends annually. PIR has also hosted the IndyCar Series, CART, USAC and the Rolex Sports Car Series. The raceway is currently owned and operated by International Speedway Corporation.

==== Entry list ====
No.	Driver	Team	Manufacturer
00	Landon Cassill	StarCom Racing	Chevrolet
1	Kurt Busch	Chip Ganassi Racing	Chevrolet
2	Brad Keselowski	Team Penske	Ford
3	Austin Dillon	Richard Childress Racing	Chevrolet
4	Kevin Harvick	Stewart-Haas Racing	Ford
6	Ryan Newman	Roush Fenway Racing	Ford
8	Daniel Hemric (R)	Richard Childress Racing	Chevrolet
9	Chase Elliott	Hendrick Motorsports	Chevrolet
10	Aric Almirola	Stewart-Haas Racing	Ford
11	Denny Hamlin	Joe Gibbs Racing	Toyota
12	Ryan Blaney	Team Penske	Ford
13	Ty Dillon	Germain Racing	Chevrolet
14	Clint Bowyer	Stewart-Haas Racing	Ford
15	Ross Chastain (i)	Premium Motorsports	Chevrolet
17	Ricky Stenhouse Jr.	Roush Fenway Racing	Ford
18	Kyle Busch	Joe Gibbs Racing	Toyota
19	Martin Truex Jr.	Joe Gibbs Racing	Toyota
20	Erik Jones	Joe Gibbs Racing	Toyota
21	Paul Menard	Wood Brothers Racing	Ford
22	Joey Logano	Team Penske	Ford
24	William Byron	Hendrick Motorsports	Chevrolet
32	Corey LaJoie	Go Fas Racing	Ford
34	Michael McDowell	Front Row Motorsports	Ford
36	Matt Tifft (R)	Front Row Motorsports	Ford
37	Chris Buescher	JTG Daugherty Racing	Chevrolet
38	David Ragan	Front Row Motorsports	Ford
41	Daniel Suárez	Stewart-Haas Racing	Ford
42	Kyle Larson	Chip Ganassi Racing	Chevrolet
43	Bubba Wallace	Richard Petty Motorsports	Chevrolet
47	Ryan Preece (R)	JTG Daugherty Racing	Chevrolet
48	Jimmie Johnson	Hendrick Motorsports	Chevrolet
51	Cody Ware (R)	Petty Ware Racing	Chevrolet
52	Bayley Currey (i)	Rick Ware Racing	Ford
77	Quin Houff (R)	Spire Motorsports	Chevrolet
88	Alex Bowman	Hendrick Motorsports	Chevrolet
95	Matt DiBenedetto	Leavine Family Racing	Toyota
Official entry list

== First practice ==
Ryan Blaney was the fastest in the first practice session with a time of 25.403 seconds and a speed of 141.716 mph (228.070 km/h).

Pos	No.	Driver	Team	Manufacturer	Time	Speed
1	12	Ryan Blaney	Team Penske	Ford	25.403	141.716
2	2	Brad Keselowski	Team Penske	Ford	25.590	140.680
3	42	Kyle Larson	Chip Ganassi Racing	Chevrolet	25.640	140.406
Official first practice results

== Qualifying ==
Ryan Blaney scored the pole for the race with a time of 25.480 and a speed of 141.287 mph (227.379 km/h).

=== Qualifying results ===
Pos	No.	Driver	Team	Manufacturer	R1	R2	R3
1	12	Ryan Blaney	Team Penske	Ford	26.073	25.641	25.480
2	9	Chase Elliott	Hendrick Motorsports	Chevrolet	25.943	25.718	25.683
3	11	Denny Hamlin	Joe Gibbs Racing	Toyota	26.207	25.663	25.713
4	18	Kyle Busch	Joe Gibbs Racing	Toyota	26.055	25.685	25.741
5	2	Brad Keselowski	Team Penske	Ford	26.045	25.673	25.742
6	88	Alex Bowman	Hendrick Motorsports	Chevrolet	26.181	25.669	25.757
7	24	William Byron	Hendrick Motorsports	Chevrolet	26.086	25.813	25.794
8	4	Kevin Harvick	Stewart-Haas Racing	Ford	25.903	25.754	25.823
9	19	Martin Truex Jr.	Joe Gibbs Racing	Toyota	26.168	25.811	25.861
10	20	Erik Jones	Joe Gibbs Racing	Toyota	26.175	25.909	25.901
11	8	Daniel Hemric (R)	Richard Childress Racing	Chevrolet	26.078	25.908	25.946
12	22	Joey Logano	Team Penske	Ford	26.046	25.819	25.962
13	3	Austin Dillon	Richard Childress Racing	Chevrolet	26.058	25.924	—
14	10	Aric Almirola	Stewart-Haas Racing	Ford	26.157	25.936	—
15	48	Jimmie Johnson	Hendrick Motorsports	Chevrolet	26.205	25.936	—
16	1	Kurt Busch	Chip Ganassi Racing	Chevrolet	26.166	25.943	—
17	21	Paul Menard	Wood Brothers Racing	Ford	26.013	25.948	—
18	6	Ryan Newman	Roush Fenway Racing	Ford	26.145	25.956	—
19	17	Ricky Stenhouse Jr.	Roush Fenway Racing	Ford	26.002	25.989	—
20	13	Ty Dillon	Germain Racing	Chevrolet	26.194	26.005	—
21	47	Ryan Preece (R)	JTG Daugherty Racing	Chevrolet	26.126	26.025	—
22	37	Chris Buescher	JTG Daugherty Racing	Chevrolet	26.016	26.191	—
23	43	Bubba Wallace	Richard Petty Motorsports	Chevrolet	26.288	26.289	—
24	32	Corey LaJoie	Go Fas Racing	Ford	26.303	26.310	—
25	95	Matt DiBenedetto	Leavine Family Racing	Toyota	26.315	—	—
26	14	Clint Bowyer	Stewart-Haas Racing	Ford	26.362	—	—
27	34	Michael McDowell	Front Row Motorsports	Ford	26.371	—	—
28	41	Daniel Suárez	Stewart-Haas Racing	Ford	26.379	—	—
29	38	David Ragan	Front Row Motorsports	Ford	26.382	—	—
30	36	Matt Tifft (R)	Front Row Motorsports	Ford	26.411	—	—
31	42	Kyle Larson	Chip Ganassi Racing	Chevrolet	26.709	—	—
32	00	Landon Cassill	StarCom Racing	Chevrolet	26.777	—	—
33	15	Ross Chastain (i)	Premium Motorsports	Chevrolet	26.989	—	—
34	51	Cody Ware (R)	Petty Ware Racing	Chevrolet	27.770	—	—
35	77	Quin Houff (R)	Spire Motorsports	Chevrolet	28.646	—	—
36	52	Bayley Currey (i)	Rick Ware Racing	Ford	0.000	—	—
Official qualifying results

== Practice (post-qualifying) ==
=== Second practice ===
Chris Buescher was the fastest in the second practice session with a time of 26.092 seconds and a speed of 137.973 mph (222.046 km/h).

Pos	No.	Driver	Team	Manufacturer	Time	Speed
1	37	Chris Buescher	JTG Daugherty Racing	Chevrolet	26.092	137.973
2	12	Ryan Blaney	Team Penske	Ford	26.103	137.915
3	2	Brad Keselowski	Team Penske	Ford	26.154	137.646
Official second practice results

=== Final practice ===
Joey Logano was the fastest in the final practice session with a time of 26.126 seconds and a speed of 137.794 mph (221.758 km/h).

Pos	No.	Driver	Team	Manufacturer	Time	Speed
1	22	Joey Logano	Team Penske	Ford	26.126	137.794
2	12	Ryan Blaney	Team Penske	Ford	26.235	137.221
3	4	Kevin Harvick	Stewart-Haas Racing	Ford	26.338	136.685
Official final practice results

== Race ==
=== Stage Results ===
Stage One Laps: 75

During pre-race ceremonies, the Luke Air Force Base presented the nation's colors. Pastor Rick Derbyshire would give out the invocation.16-year old Chevel Shepherd, who had won Season 15 of The Voice, would sing the national anthem. The son of the CEO of TicketGuardian. Hudson Derbyshire, accompanied by his father and CEO, Brian and his mom, gave out the starting command.

At the race start, NASCAR judged that Chase Elliott jumped the restart against Ryan Blaney, and Elliott, while leading the first couple of laps, had to make a pass through penalty on pit road. Ryan Blaney would lead the first 35 laps before being passed by Kyle Busch on lap 36. Three laps later, Erik Jones would suffer a flat tire and spin in Turn 2, causing the first caution of the day. After cycling through pit stops, Denny Hamlin would lead the field to green on lap 46, before being passed for the lead by Busch just a lap later. Busch would lead until lap 65, when Brad Keselowski also suffering a flat tire and hitting the Turn 2 wall, almost collecting Ryan Preece. After more pit stops, Ryan Blaney would restart in the lead on lap 71 and would hang on to win the first stage.

Pos	No	Driver	Team	Manufacturer	Points
1	12	Ryan Blaney	Team Penske	Ford	10
2	10	Aric Almirola	Stewart-Haas Racing	Ford	9
3	22	Joey Logano	Team Penske	Ford	8
4	88	Alex Bowman	Hendrick Motorsports	Chevrolet	7
5	18	Kyle Busch	Joe Gibbs Racing	Toyota	6
6	42	Kyle Larson	Chip Ganassi Racing	Chevrolet	5
7	3	Austin Dillon	Richard Childress Racing	Chevrolet	4
8	24	William Byron	Hendrick Motorsports	Chevrolet	3
9	9	Chase Elliott	Hendrick Motorsports	Chevrolet	2
10	4	Kevin Harvick	Stewart-Haas Racing	Ford	1
Official stage one results

Stage Two Laps: 75

The field restarted on lap 84, with Kyle Busch leading the field to green. Busch, starting from lap 80 would go on to lead the next 73 laps. Alex Bowman would suffer a flat tire with just three laps to go in the stage, hitting the turn 1 wall. Kyle Busch would win the stage under caution.

Pos	No	Driver	Team	Manufacturer	Points
1	18	Kyle Busch	Joe Gibbs Racing	Toyota	10
2	14	Clint Bowyer	Stewart-Haas Racing	Ford	9
3	4	Kevin Harvick	Stewart-Haas Racing	Ford	8
4	19	Martin Truex Jr.	Joe Gibbs Racing	Toyota	7
5	11	Denny Hamlin	Joe Gibbs Racing	Toyota	6
6	6	Ryan Newman	Roush Fenway Racing	Ford	5
7	48	Jimmie Johnson	Hendrick Motorsports	Chevrolet	4
8	22	Joey Logano	Team Penske	Ford	3
9	9	Chase Elliott	Hendrick Motorsports	Chevrolet	2
10	1	Kurt Busch	Chip Ganassi Racing	Chevrolet	1
Official stage two results

=== Final Stage Results ===
Stage Three Laps: 162

Kyle Busch would jump to the lead on the initial restart, but a lap later Michael McDowell after missing the exit of the turn 2 wall, got hit in the rear by David Ragan and hit the wall. His car would not steer and would then hit the turn 3 wall, causing McDowell to retire. Kyle Busch would once again lead the field to the restart on lap 166, and would stay in the lead until lap 195, when Alex Bowman had another flat tire and pounded the turn 3 wall. Alex Bowman would retire from the race. Busch restarted and held on to the lead until lap 219, when Elliott spun off of turn 4. Hemric would take the lead after pit stops cycled, and restarted in first. However, on the first lap of the restart, Preece would hit the wall and clip the right front end of Daniel Suarez's car, sending Preece into the inside backstretch wall. Blaney would take the lead again, however Preece would again cause another caution, causing him to retire. Almirola would restart and take the lead until lap 251 when Blaney took the lead. Blaney held on to the lead until Busch, after a few laps battling took the lead on lap 296. Busch would pull away from Blaney and win.

Pos	Grid	No	Driver	Team	Manufacturer	Laps	Points
1	4	18	Kyle Busch	Joe Gibbs Racing	Toyota	312	56
2	9	19	Martin Truex Jr.	Joe Gibbs Racing	Toyota	312	42
3	1	12	Ryan Blaney	Team Penske	Ford	312	44
4	14	10	Aric Almirola	Stewart-Haas Racing	Ford	312	42
5	3	11	Denny Hamlin	Joe Gibbs Racing	Toyota	312	38
6	31	42	Kyle Larson	Chip Ganassi Racing	Chevrolet	312	36
7	16	1	Kurt Busch	Chip Ganassi Racing	Chevrolet	312	31
8	15	48	Jimmie Johnson	Hendrick Motorsports	Chevrolet	312	33
9	8	4	Kevin Harvick	Stewart-Haas Racing	Ford	312	37
10	12	22	Joey Logano	Team Penske	Ford	312	38
11	26	14	Clint Bowyer	Stewart-Haas Racing	Ford	312	35
12	18	6	Ryan Newman	Roush Fenway Racing	Ford	312	30
13	19	17	Ricky Stenhouse Jr.	Roush Fenway Racing	Ford	312	24
14	2	9	Chase Elliott	Hendrick Motorsports	Chevrolet	312	27
15	20	13	Ty Dillon	Germain Racing	Chevrolet	312	22
16	22	37	Chris Buescher	JTG Daugherty Racing	Chevrolet	312	21
17	17	21	Paul Menard	Wood Brothers Racing	Ford	311	20
18	11	8	Daniel Hemric (R)	Richard Childress Racing	Chevrolet	311	19
19	5	2	Brad Keselowski	Team Penske	Ford	311	18
20	30	36	Matt Tifft (R)	Front Row Motorsports	Ford	311	17
21	13	3	Austin Dillon	Richard Childress Racing	Chevrolet	311	20
22	23	43	Bubba Wallace	Richard Petty Motorsports	Chevrolet	311	15
23	28	41	Daniel Suárez	Stewart-Haas Racing	Ford	311	14
24	7	24	William Byron	Hendrick Motorsports	Chevrolet	310	16
25	29	38	David Ragan	Front Row Motorsports	Ford	310	12
26	24	32	Corey LaJoie	Go Fas Racing	Ford	310	11
27	33	15	Ross Chastain (i)	Premium Motorsports	Chevrolet	308	0
28	25	95	Matt DiBenedetto	Leavine Family Racing	Toyota	308	9
29	10	20	Erik Jones	Joe Gibbs Racing	Toyota	304	8
30	35	77	Quin Houff (R)	Spire Motorsports	Chevrolet	302	7
31	36	52	Bayley Currey (i)	Rick Ware Racing	Ford	301	0
32	34	51	Cody Ware (R)	Petty Ware Racing	Chevrolet	300	5
33	32	00	Landon Cassill	StarCom Racing	Chevrolet	267	4
34	21	47	Ryan Preece (R)	JTG Daugherty Racing	Chevrolet	229	3
35	6	88	Alex Bowman	Hendrick Motorsports	Chevrolet	191	9
36	27	34	Michael McDowell	Front Row Motorsports	Ford	157	1
Official race results

=== Race statistics ===
- Lead changes: 17 among 6 different drivers
- Cautions/Laps: 9 for 57
- Red flags: 0
- Time of race: 3 hours, 4 minutes and 5 seconds
- Average speed: 101.693 miles per hour (163.659 km/h)

== Media ==
=== Television ===
Fox Sports covered their 15th race at the ISM Raceway. Mike Joy, two-time Phoenix winner Jeff Gordon and Darrell Waltrip called the race from the broadcast booth. Jamie Little, Vince Welch and Matt Yocum handled the pit road duties for the television side.

Fox
Booth announcers	Pit reporters
Lap-by-lap: Mike Joy; Color-commentator: Jeff Gordon; Color commentator: Darrell Waltrip	Jamie Little; Vince Welch; Matt Yocum

=== Radio ===
MRN covered the radio action for the race which was also simulcasted on Sirius XM NASCAR Radio.

MRN
Booth announcers	Turn announcers	Pit reporters
Lead announcer: Alex Hayden; Announcer: Jeff Striegle; Announcer: Rusty Wallace	Turns 1 & 2: Dan Hubbard; Turns 3 & 4: Kyle Rickey	Jason Toy; Steve Post; Dillon Welch

== Standings after the race ==
Drivers' Championship standings

	Pos	Driver	Points
3	1	Kyle Busch	177
1	2	Joey Logano	171 (–6)
1	3	Kevin Harvick	168 (–9)
1	4	Denny Hamlin	165 (–12)
3	5	Martin Truex Jr.	140 (–37)
	6	Kyle Larson	138 (–39)
4	7	Aric Almirola	134 (–43)
3	8	Brad Keselowski	133 (–44)
1	9	Kurt Busch	126 (–51)
3	10	Ricky Stenhouse Jr.	123 (–54)
2	11	Clint Bowyer	118 (–59)
3	12	Ryan Blaney	113 (–64)
1	13	Chase Elliott	108 (–69)
5	14	Erik Jones	106 (–71)
2	15	Jimmie Johnson	98 (–79)
4	16	Alex Bowman	94 (–83)
Official driver's standings

Manufacturers' Championship standings

	Pos	Manufacturer	Points
1	1	Toyota	149
1	2	Ford	147 (–2)
	3	Chevrolet	128 (–21)

- Note: Only the first 16 positions are included for the driver standings.

Previous race: 2019 Pennzoil 400	Monster Energy NASCAR Cup Series; 2019 season	Next race: 2019 Auto Club 400
