= 2020 Supermarket Heroes 500 =

NASCAR Cup Series race

Race details
- Race 9 of 36 in the 2020 NASCAR Cup Series
- 2020 Supermarket Heroes 500 program cover
- Date: May 31, 2020
- Location: Bristol Motor Speedway in Bristol, Tennessee
- Course: Permanent racing facility
- Course length: 0.858 km (0.533 miles)
- Distance: 500 laps, 266.5 mi (429 km)
- Average speed: 80.338 miles per hour (129.291 km/h)

Pole position
Driver	Brad Keselowski	Team Penske
- Grid positions set by ballot

Most laps led
Driver	Denny Hamlin	Joe Gibbs Racing
- Laps: 131

Winner
No. 2	Brad Keselowski	Team Penske

Television in the United States
- Network: FS1
- Announcers: Mike Joy and Jeff Gordon
- Nielsen ratings: 2.932 million

Radio in the United States
- Radio: PRN
- Booth announcers: Doug Rice and Mark Garrow
- Turn announcers: Rob Albright (Backstretch)

The 2020 Supermarket Heroes 500 is a NASCAR Cup Series race that was originally scheduled to be held on April 5, 2020 and was rescheduled to May 31, 2020, at Bristol Motor Speedway in Bristol, Tennessee. Contested over 500 laps on the 0.533 miles (0.858 km) concrete short track, it was the ninth race of the 2020 NASCAR Cup Series season. The race was won by Brad Keselowski after Joey Logano and Chase Elliott wrecked as Elliott got loose and hit Logano coming off turn 4 with 3 laps to go.

== Report ==
=== Background ===
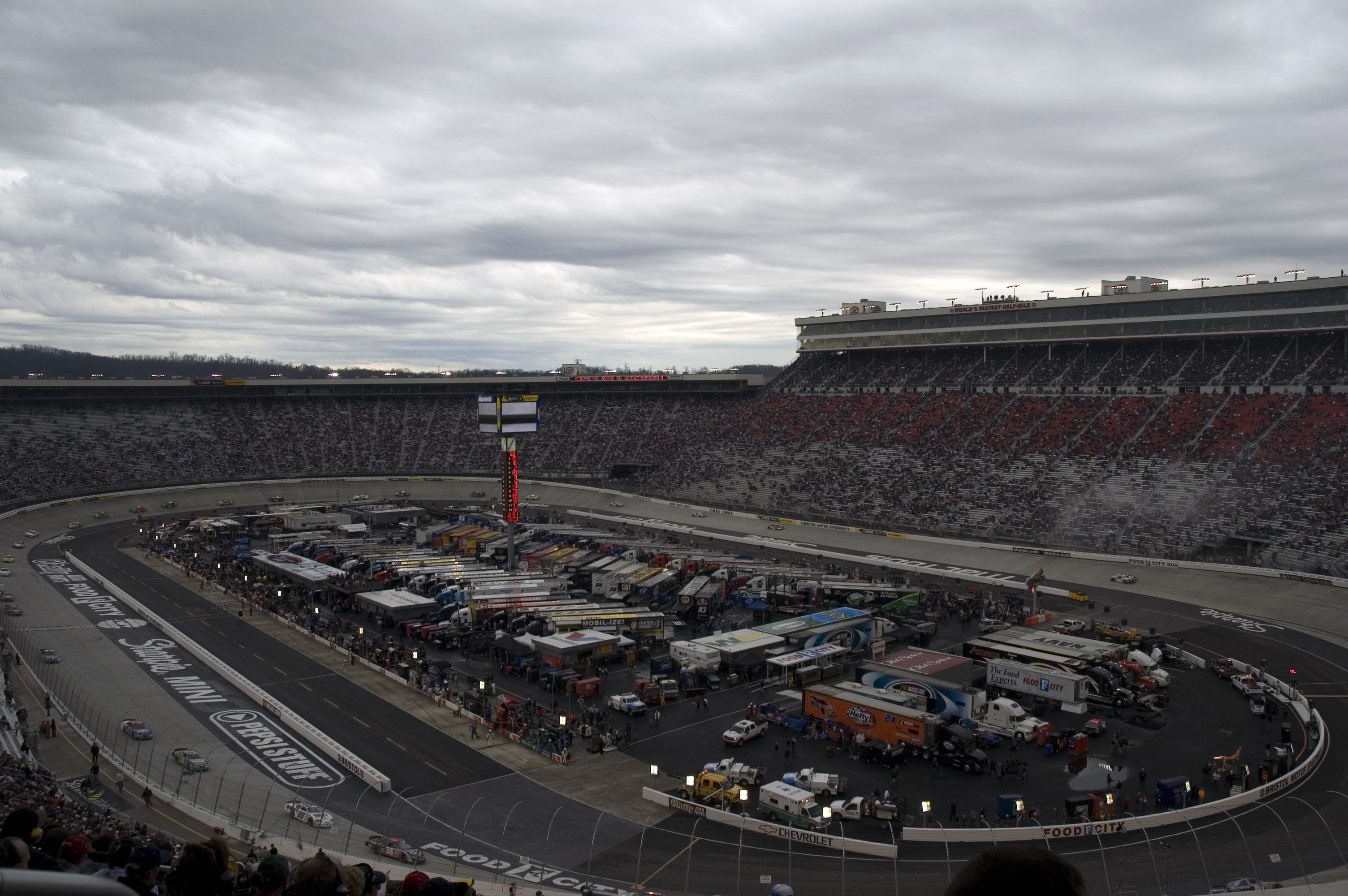
Bristol Motor Speedway, the track where the race was held.

Bristol Motor Speedway, formerly known as Bristol International Raceway and Bristol Raceway, is a NASCAR short track venue located in Bristol, Tennessee. Constructed in 1960, it held its first NASCAR race on July 30, 1961. Despite its short length, Bristol is among the most popular tracks on the NASCAR schedule because of its distinct features, which include extraordinarily steep banking, an all concrete surface, two pit roads, and stadium-like seating.

Due to the COVID-19 pandemic, the race was moved from its original April 5 date to May 31. Sponsor K-VA-T Food Stores Inc. also rebranded the event to the "Food City presents the Supermarket Heroes 500" to honor grocery store workers during the pandemic. The event was held behind closed doors with ticketholders later given the option of exchanging the tickets for later events, including the 2020 NASCAR All-Star Race that is to be held at Bristol at 20% capacity.

==== Entry list ====
- (R) denotes rookie driver.
- (i) denotes driver who are ineligible for series driver points.

No.	Driver	Team	Manufacturer
00	Quin Houff (R)	StarCom Racing	Chevrolet
1	Kurt Busch	Chip Ganassi Racing	Chevrolet
2	Brad Keselowski	Team Penske	Ford
3	Austin Dillon	Richard Childress Racing	Chevrolet
4	Kevin Harvick	Stewart-Haas Racing	Ford
6	Ryan Newman	Roush Fenway Racing	Ford
7	J. J. Yeley (i)	Tommy Baldwin Racing	Chevrolet
8	Tyler Reddick (R)	Richard Childress Racing	Chevrolet
9	Chase Elliott	Hendrick Motorsports	Chevrolet
10	Aric Almirola	Stewart-Haas Racing	Ford
11	Denny Hamlin	Joe Gibbs Racing	Toyota
12	Ryan Blaney	Team Penske	Ford
13	Ty Dillon	Germain Racing	Chevrolet
14	Clint Bowyer	Stewart-Haas Racing	Ford
15	Brennan Poole (R)	Premium Motorsports	Chevrolet
17	Chris Buescher	Roush Fenway Racing	Ford
18	Kyle Busch	Joe Gibbs Racing	Toyota
19	Martin Truex Jr.	Joe Gibbs Racing	Toyota
20	Erik Jones	Joe Gibbs Racing	Toyota
21	Matt DiBenedetto	Wood Brothers Racing	Ford
22	Joey Logano	Team Penske	Ford
24	William Byron	Hendrick Motorsports	Chevrolet
27	Gray Gaulding	Rick Ware Racing	Ford
32	Corey LaJoie	Go Fas Racing	Ford
34	Michael McDowell	Front Row Motorsports	Ford
37	Ryan Preece	JTG Daugherty Racing	Chevrolet
38	John Hunter Nemechek (R)	Front Row Motorsports	Ford
41	Cole Custer (R)	Stewart-Haas Racing	Ford
42	Matt Kenseth	Chip Ganassi Racing	Chevrolet
43	Bubba Wallace	Richard Petty Motorsports	Chevrolet
47	Ricky Stenhouse Jr.	JTG Daugherty Racing	Chevrolet
48	Jimmie Johnson	Hendrick Motorsports	Chevrolet
51	Joey Gase (i)	Petty Ware Racing	Chevrolet
53	Bayley Currey (i)	Rick Ware Racing	Chevrolet
66	Timmy Hill (i)	MBM Motorsports	Toyota
77	Garrett Smithley (i)	Spire Motorsports	Chevrolet
78	B. J. McLeod (i)	B. J. McLeod Motorsports	Ford
88	Alex Bowman	Hendrick Motorsports	Chevrolet
95	Christopher Bell (R)	Leavine Family Racing	Toyota
96	Daniel Suárez	Gaunt Brothers Racing	Toyota
Official entry list

== Qualifying ==
Brad Keselowski was awarded the pole for the race as determined by a random draw.

=== Starting Lineup ===
Pos	No.	Driver	Team	Manufacturer
1	2	Brad Keselowski	Team Penske	Ford
2	10	Aric Almirola	Stewart-Haas Racing	Ford
3	22	Joey Logano	Team Penske	Ford
4	12	Ryan Blaney	Team Penske	Ford
5	19	Martin Truex Jr.	Joe Gibbs Racing	Toyota
6	9	Chase Elliott	Hendrick Motorsports	Chevrolet
7	18	Kyle Busch	Joe Gibbs Racing	Toyota
8	4	Kevin Harvick	Stewart-Haas Racing	Ford
9	21	Matt DiBenedetto	Wood Brothers Racing	Ford
10	11	Denny Hamlin	Joe Gibbs Racing	Toyota
11	88	Alex Bowman	Hendrick Motorsports	Chevrolet
12	1	Kurt Busch	Chip Ganassi Racing	Chevrolet
13	24	William Byron	Hendrick Motorsports	Chevrolet
14	42	Matt Kenseth	Chip Ganassi Racing	Chevrolet
15	20	Erik Jones	Joe Gibbs Racing	Toyota
16	47	Ricky Stenhouse Jr.	JTG Daugherty Racing	Chevrolet
17	6	Ryan Newman	Roush Fenway Racing	Ford
18	38	John Hunter Nemechek (R)	Front Row Motorsports	Ford
19	17	Chris Buescher	Roush Fenway Racing	Ford
20	3	Austin Dillon	Richard Childress Racing	Chevrolet
21	8	Tyler Reddick (R)	Richard Childress Racing	Chevrolet
22	41	Cole Custer (R)	Stewart-Haas Racing	Ford
23	14	Clint Bowyer	Stewart-Haas Racing	Ford
24	48	Jimmie Johnson	Hendrick Motorsports	Chevrolet
25	34	Michael McDowell	Front Row Motorsports	Ford
26	53	Bayley Currey (i)	Rick Ware Racing	Chevrolet
27	51	Joey Gase (i)	Petty Ware Racing	Chevrolet
28	00	Quin Houff (R)	StarCom Racing	Chevrolet
29	13	Ty Dillon	Germain Racing	Chevrolet
30	27	Gray Gaulding	Rick Ware Racing	Ford
31	77	Garrett Smithley (i)	Spire Motorsports	Chevrolet
32	32	Corey LaJoie	Go Fas Racing	Ford
33	37	Ryan Preece	JTG Daugherty Racing	Chevrolet
34	15	Brennan Poole (R)	Premium Motorsports	Chevrolet
35	95	Christopher Bell (R)	Leavine Family Racing	Toyota
36	43	Bubba Wallace	Richard Petty Motorsports	Chevrolet
37	96	Daniel Suárez	Gaunt Brothers Racing	Toyota
38	66	Timmy Hill (i)	MBM Motorsports	Toyota
39	78	B. J. McLeod (i)	B. J. McLeod Motorsports	Ford
40	7	J. J. Yeley (i)	Tommy Baldwin Racing	Chevrolet
Official starting lineup

== Race ==
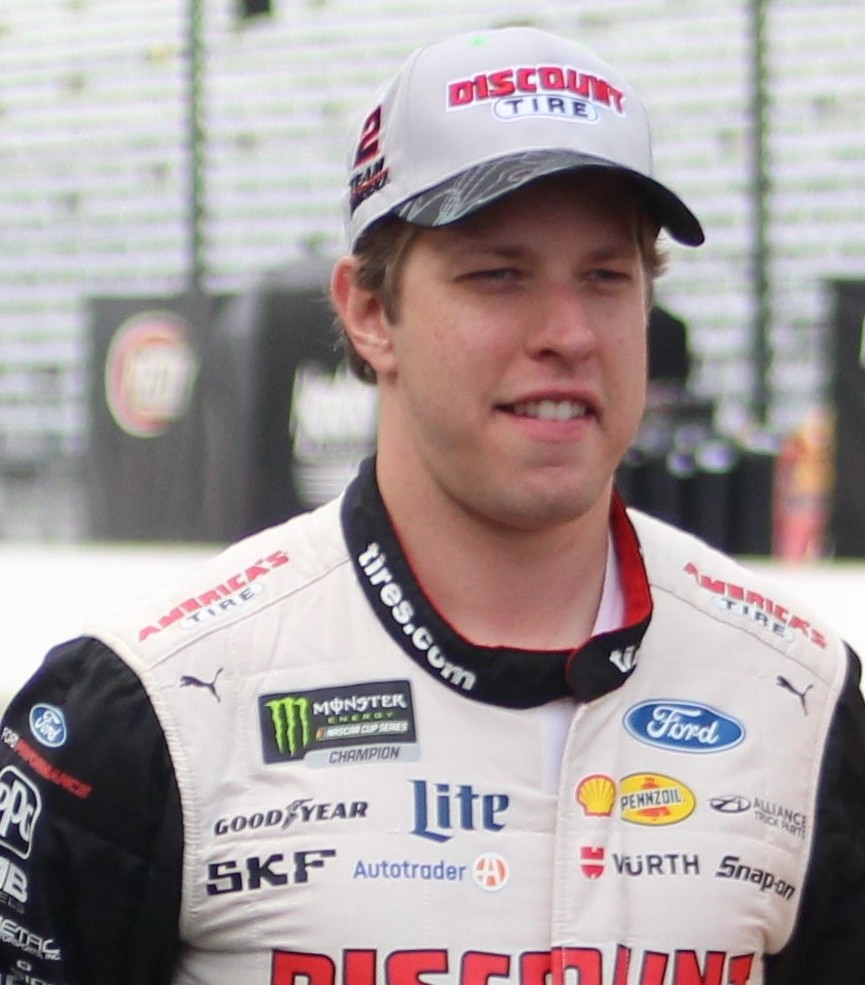
Brad Keselowski won the race.

=== Stage Results ===
Stage One Laps: 125

Pos	No	Driver	Team	Manufacturer	Points
1	9	Chase Elliott	Hendrick Motorsports	Chevrolet	10
2	12	Ryan Blaney	Team Penske	Ford	9
3	2	Brad Keselowski	Team Penske	Ford	8
4	10	Aric Almirola	Stewart-Haas Racing	Ford	7
5	22	Joey Logano	Team Penske	Ford	6
6	4	Kevin Harvick	Stewart-Haas Racing	Ford	5
7	21	Matt DiBenedetto	Wood Brothers Racing	Ford	4
8	11	Denny Hamlin	Joe Gibbs Racing	Toyota	3
9	47	Ricky Stenhouse Jr.	JTG Daugherty Racing	Chevrolet	2
10	48	Jimmie Johnson	Hendrick Motorsports	Chevrolet	1
Official stage one results

Stage Two Laps: 125

Pos	No	Driver	Team	Manufacturer	Points
1	9	Chase Elliott	Hendrick Motorsports	Chevrolet	10
2	11	Denny Hamlin	Joe Gibbs Racing	Toyota	9
3	4	Kevin Harvick	Stewart-Haas Racing	Ford	8
4	22	Joey Logano	Team Penske	Ford	7
5	18	Kyle Busch	Joe Gibbs Racing	Toyota	6
6	14	Clint Bowyer	Stewart-Haas Racing	Ford	5
7	24	William Byron	Hendrick Motorsports	Chevrolet	4
8	20	Erik Jones	Joe Gibbs Racing	Toyota	3
9	2	Brad Keselowski	Team Penske	Ford	2
10	17	Chris Buescher	Roush Fenway Racing	Ford	1
Official stage two results

=== Final Stage Results ===
Stage Three Laps: 250

Pos	Grid	No	Driver	Team	Manufacturer	Laps	Points
1	1	2	Brad Keselowski	Team Penske	Ford	500	50
2	23	14	Clint Bowyer	Stewart-Haas Racing	Ford	500	40
3	24	48	Jimmie Johnson	Hendrick Motorsports	Chevrolet	500	35
4	7	18	Kyle Busch	Joe Gibbs Racing	Toyota	500	39
5	15	20	Erik Jones	Joe Gibbs Racing	Toyota	500	35
6	20	3	Austin Dillon	Richard Childress Racing	Chevrolet	500	31
7	12	1	Kurt Busch	Chip Ganassi Racing	Chevrolet	500	30
8	13	24	William Byron	Hendrick Motorsports	Chevrolet	500	33
9	35	95	Christopher Bell (R)	Leavine Family Racing	Toyota	500	28
10	36	43	Bubba Wallace	Richard Petty Motorsports	Chevrolet	500	27
11	8	4	Kevin Harvick	Stewart-Haas Racing	Ford	500	39
12	33	37	Ryan Preece	JTG Daugherty Racing	Chevrolet	500	25
13	18	38	John Hunter Nemechek (R)	Front Row Motorsports	Ford	500	24
14	25	34	Michael McDowell	Front Row Motorsports	Ford	500	23
15	17	6	Ryan Newman	Roush Fenway Racing	Ford	500	22
16	14	42	Matt Kenseth	Chip Ganassi Racing	Chevrolet	500	21
17	10	11	Denny Hamlin	Joe Gibbs Racing	Toyota	500	32
18	37	96	Daniel Suárez	Gaunt Brothers Racing	Toyota	500	19
19	38	66	Timmy Hill (i)	MBM Motorsports	Toyota	500	0
20	5	19	Martin Truex Jr.	Joe Gibbs Racing	Toyota	500	17
21	3	22	Joey Logano	Team Penske	Ford	500	29
22	6	9	Chase Elliott	Hendrick Motorsports	Chevrolet	500	35
23	19	17	Chris Buescher	Roush Fenway Racing	Ford	496	15
24	34	15	Brennan Poole (R)	Premium Motorsports	Chevrolet	494	13
25	40	7	J. J. Yeley (i)	Tommy Baldwin Racing	Chevrolet	492	0
26	31	77	Garrett Smithley	Spire Motorsports	Chevrolet	489	0
27	28	00	Quin Houff	StarCom Racing	Chevrolet	483	10
28	39	78	B. J. McLeod (i)	B. J. McLeod Motorsports	Ford	477	0
29	2	10	Aric Almirola	Stewart-Haas Racing	Ford	470	15
30	30	27	Gray Gaulding	Rick Ware Racing	Ford	456	7
31	9	21	Matt DiBenedetto	Wood Brothers Racing	Ford	456	10
32	32	32	Corey LaJoie	Go Fas Racing	Ford	375	5
33	27	51	Joey Gase (i)	Petty Ware Racing	Chevrolet	302	0
34	16	47	Ricky Stenhouse Jr.	JTG Daugherty Racing	Chevrolet	228	5
35	22	41	Cole Custer (R)	Stewart-Haas Racing	Ford	228	2
36	21	8	Tyler Reddick (R)	Richard Childress Racing	Chevrolet	228	1
37	11	88	Alex Bowman	Hendrick Motorsports	Chevrolet	228	1
38	26	53	Bayley Currey (i)	Rick Ware Racing	Chevrolet	203	0
39	29	13	Ty Dillon	Germain Racing	Chevrolet	201	1
40	4	12	Ryan Blaney	Team Penske	Ford	199	10
Official race results

=== Race statistics ===
- Lead changes: 21 among 7 different drivers
- Cautions/Laps: 17 for 102
- Red flags: 1 for 11 minutes and 35 seconds
- Time of race: 3 hours, 19 minutes and 2 seconds
- Average speed: 80.338 miles per hour (129.291 km/h)

== Media ==
=== Television ===
Fox Sports covered their 20th race at the Bristol Motor Speedway. Mike Joy and five-time Bristol winner Jeff Gordon covered the race from the Fox Sports studio in Charlotte. Matt Yocum handled the pit road duties. Larry McReynolds provided insight from the Fox Sports studio in Charlotte.

FS1
Booth announcers	Pit reporter	In-race analyst
Lap-by-lap: Mike Joy; Color-commentator: Jeff Gordon	Matt Yocum	Larry McReynolds

=== Radio ===
PRN had the radio call for the race which will was simulcasted on Sirius XM NASCAR Radio. Doug Rice, Mark Garrow called the race in the booth when the field raced down the frontstretch. Rob Albright called the race from atop the turn 3 suites when the field raced down the backstretch. Brad Gillie, Brett McMillan and Wendy Venturini covered the action on pit lane.

PRN
Booth announcers	Turn announcers	Pit reporters
Lead announcer: Doug Rice; Announcer: Mark Garrow	Backstretch: Rob Albright	Brad Gillie; Brett McMillan; Wendy Venturini

== Standings after the race ==
Drivers' Championship standings

	Pos	Driver	Points
	1	Kevin Harvick	370
	2	Joey Logano	346 (–24)
	3	Chase Elliott	325 (–45)
1	4	Brad Keselowski	315 (–55)
1	5	Alex Bowman	289 (–81)
1	6	Martin Truex Jr.	280 (–90)
1	7	Denny Hamlin	276 (–94)
2	8	Ryan Blaney	274 (–96)
3	9	Kyle Busch	256 (–114)
	10	Kurt Busch	253 (–117)
2	11	Aric Almirola	240 (–130)
2	12	Clint Bowyer	232 (–138)
2	13	Matt DiBenedetto	230 (–140)
1	14	Erik Jones	228 (–142)
1	15	Jimmie Johnson	223 (–147)
1	16	Austin Dillon	221 (–149)
Official driver's standings

Manufacturers' Championship standings

Pos	Manufacturer	Points
1	Ford	335
2	Chevrolet	310 (–25)
3	Toyota	304 (–31)

- Note: Only the first 16 positions are included for the driver standings.
- . – Driver has clinched a position in the NASCAR Cup Series playoffs.

Previous race: 2020 Alsco Uniforms 500	NASCAR Cup Series; 2020 season	Next race: 2020 Folds of Honor QuikTrip 500
