= 2020 Folds of Honor QuikTrip 500 =

NASCAR Cup Series race

Race details
- Race 10 of 36 in the 2020 NASCAR Cup Series
- The 2020 Folds of Honor QuikTrip 500 program cover, with the original scheduled date of March 15, 2020.
- Date: June 7, 2020
- Location: Atlanta Motor Speedway in Hampton, Georgia
- Course: Permanent racing facility
- Course length: 2.48 km (1.54 miles)
- Distance: 325 laps, 500.5 mi (806 km)
- Average speed: 142.966 miles per hour (230.081 km/h)

Pole position
Driver	Chase Elliott	Hendrick Motorsports
- Grid positions set by ballot

Most laps led
Driver	Kevin Harvick	Stewart-Haas Racing
- Laps: 150

Winner
No. 4	Kevin Harvick	Stewart-Haas Racing

Television in the United States
- Network: Fox
- Announcers: Mike Joy and Jeff Gordon
- Nielsen ratings: 3.957 million

Radio in the United States
- Radio: PRN
- Booth announcers: Doug Rice and Mark Garrow
- Turn announcers: Rob Albright (1 & 2) and Pat Patterson (3 & 4)

The 2020 Folds of Honor QuikTrip 500 was a NASCAR Cup Series race that was originally scheduled to be held on March 15, 2020, and was rescheduled to June 7, 2020, at Atlanta Motor Speedway in Hampton, Georgia. On March 13, 2020, NASCAR announced that they would postpone the race due to the COVID-19 pandemic. Contested over 325 laps on the 1.54-mile-long (2.48 km) asphalt quad-oval intermediate speedway, it was the 10th race of the 2020 NASCAR Cup Series season.

== Report ==
=== Background ===
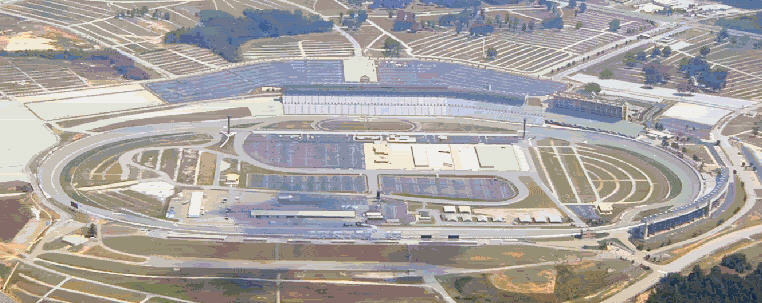
Atlanta Motor Speedway, the track where the race was held.

Atlanta Motor Speedway (formerly Atlanta International Raceway) is a track in Hampton, Georgia, 20 miles (32 km) south of Atlanta. It is a 1.54-mile (2.48 km) quad-oval track with a seating capacity of 111,000. It opened in 1960 as a 1.5-mile (2.4 km) standard oval. In 1994, 46 condominiums were built over the northeastern side of the track. In 1997, to standardize the track with Speedway Motorsports' other two 1.5-mile (2.4 km) ovals, the entire track was almost completely rebuilt. The frontstretch and backstretch were swapped, and the configuration of the track was changed from oval to quad-oval. The project made the track one of the fastest on the NASCAR circuit.

The event was run with grandstands, infield, and backstretch camping closed. Owners of the 46 condominiums in Turn Four were permitted to attend the weekend live with a procedure similar to Charlotte Motor Speedway, with each owner having five tickets to the event, for 230 spectators.

==== Entry list ====
- (R) denotes rookie driver.
- (i) denotes driver who are ineligible for series driver points.

No.	Driver	Team	Manufacturer
00	Quin Houff (R)	StarCom Racing	Chevrolet
1	Kurt Busch	Chip Ganassi Racing	Chevrolet
2	Brad Keselowski	Team Penske	Ford
3	Austin Dillon	Richard Childress Racing	Chevrolet
4	Kevin Harvick	Stewart-Haas Racing	Ford
6	Ryan Newman	Roush Fenway Racing	Ford
7	Reed Sorenson	Tommy Baldwin Racing	Chevrolet
8	Tyler Reddick (R)	Richard Childress Racing	Chevrolet
9	Chase Elliott	Hendrick Motorsports	Chevrolet
10	Aric Almirola	Stewart-Haas Racing	Ford
11	Denny Hamlin	Joe Gibbs Racing	Toyota
12	Ryan Blaney	Team Penske	Ford
13	Ty Dillon	Germain Racing	Chevrolet
14	Clint Bowyer	Stewart-Haas Racing	Ford
15	Brennan Poole (R)	Premium Motorsports	Chevrolet
17	Chris Buescher	Roush Fenway Racing	Ford
18	Kyle Busch	Joe Gibbs Racing	Toyota
19	Martin Truex Jr.	Joe Gibbs Racing	Toyota
20	Erik Jones	Joe Gibbs Racing	Toyota
21	Matt DiBenedetto	Wood Brothers Racing	Ford
22	Joey Logano	Team Penske	Ford
24	William Byron	Hendrick Motorsports	Chevrolet
27	Josh Bilicki (i)	Rick Ware Racing	Ford
32	Corey LaJoie	Go Fas Racing	Ford
34	Michael McDowell	Front Row Motorsports	Ford
37	Ryan Preece	JTG Daugherty Racing	Chevrolet
38	John Hunter Nemechek (R)	Front Row Motorsports	Ford
41	Cole Custer (R)	Stewart-Haas Racing	Ford
42	Matt Kenseth	Chip Ganassi Racing	Chevrolet
43	Bubba Wallace	Richard Petty Motorsports	Chevrolet
47	Ricky Stenhouse Jr.	JTG Daugherty Racing	Chevrolet
48	Jimmie Johnson	Hendrick Motorsports	Chevrolet
51	Joey Gase (i)	Petty Ware Racing	Ford
53	Garrett Smithley (i)	Rick Ware Racing	Chevrolet
66	Timmy Hill (i)	MBM Motorsports	Toyota
77	J. J. Yeley (i)	Spire Motorsports	Chevrolet
78	B. J. McLeod (i)	B. J. McLeod Motorsports	Chevrolet
88	Alex Bowman	Hendrick Motorsports	Chevrolet
95	Christopher Bell (R)	Leavine Family Racing	Toyota
96	Daniel Suárez	Gaunt Brothers Racing	Toyota
Official entry list

== Qualifying ==
Chase Elliott was awarded the pole for the race as determined by a random draw.

=== Starting Lineup ===
Pos	No.	Driver	Team	Manufacturer
1	9	Chase Elliott	Hendrick Motorsports	Chevrolet
2	10	Aric Almirola	Stewart-Haas Racing	Ford
3	22	Joey Logano	Team Penske	Ford
4	18	Kyle Busch	Joe Gibbs Racing	Toyota
5	14	Clint Bowyer	Stewart-Haas Racing	Ford
6	2	Brad Keselowski	Team Penske	Ford
7	12	Ryan Blaney	Team Penske	Ford
8	88	Alex Bowman	Hendrick Motorsports	Chevrolet
9	4	Kevin Harvick	Stewart-Haas Racing	Ford
10	11	Denny Hamlin	Joe Gibbs Racing	Toyota
11	19	Martin Truex Jr.	Joe Gibbs Racing	Toyota
12	1	Kurt Busch	Chip Ganassi Racing	Chevrolet
13	17	Chris Buescher	Roush Fenway Racing	Ford
14	20	Erik Jones	Joe Gibbs Racing	Toyota
15	48	Jimmie Johnson	Hendrick Motorsports	Chevrolet
16	3	Austin Dillon	Richard Childress Racing	Chevrolet
17	6	Ryan Newman	Roush Fenway Racing	Ford
18	38	John Hunter Nemechek (R)	Front Row Motorsports	Ford
19	42	Matt Kenseth	Chip Ganassi Racing	Chevrolet
20	24	William Byron	Hendrick Motorsports	Chevrolet
21	21	Matt DiBenedetto	Wood Brothers Racing	Ford
22	47	Ricky Stenhouse Jr.	JTG Daugherty Racing	Chevrolet
23	43	Bubba Wallace	Richard Petty Motorsports	Chevrolet
24	8	Tyler Reddick (R)	Richard Childress Racing	Chevrolet
25	32	Corey LaJoie	Go Fas Racing	Ford
26	51	Joey Gase (i)	Petty Ware Racing	Ford
27	95	Christopher Bell (R)	Leavine Family Racing	Toyota
28	13	Ty Dillon	Germain Racing	Chevrolet
29	37	Ryan Preece	JTG Daugherty Racing	Chevrolet
30	77	J. J. Yeley (i)	Spire Motorsports	Chevrolet
31	41	Cole Custer (R)	Stewart-Haas Racing	Ford
32	27	Josh Bilicki (i)	Rick Ware Racing	Ford
33	15	Brennan Poole (R)	Premium Motorsports	Chevrolet
34	53	Garrett Smithley (i)	Rick Ware Racing	Chevrolet
35	00	Quin Houff (R)	StarCom Racing	Chevrolet
36	34	Michael McDowell	Front Row Motorsports	Ford
37	96	Daniel Suárez	Gaunt Brothers Racing	Toyota
38	66	Timmy Hill (i)	MBM Motorsports	Toyota
39	78	B. J. McLeod (i)	B. J. McLeod Motorsports	Chevrolet
40	7	Reed Sorenson	Tommy Baldwin Racing	Chevrolet
Official starting lineup

== Race ==
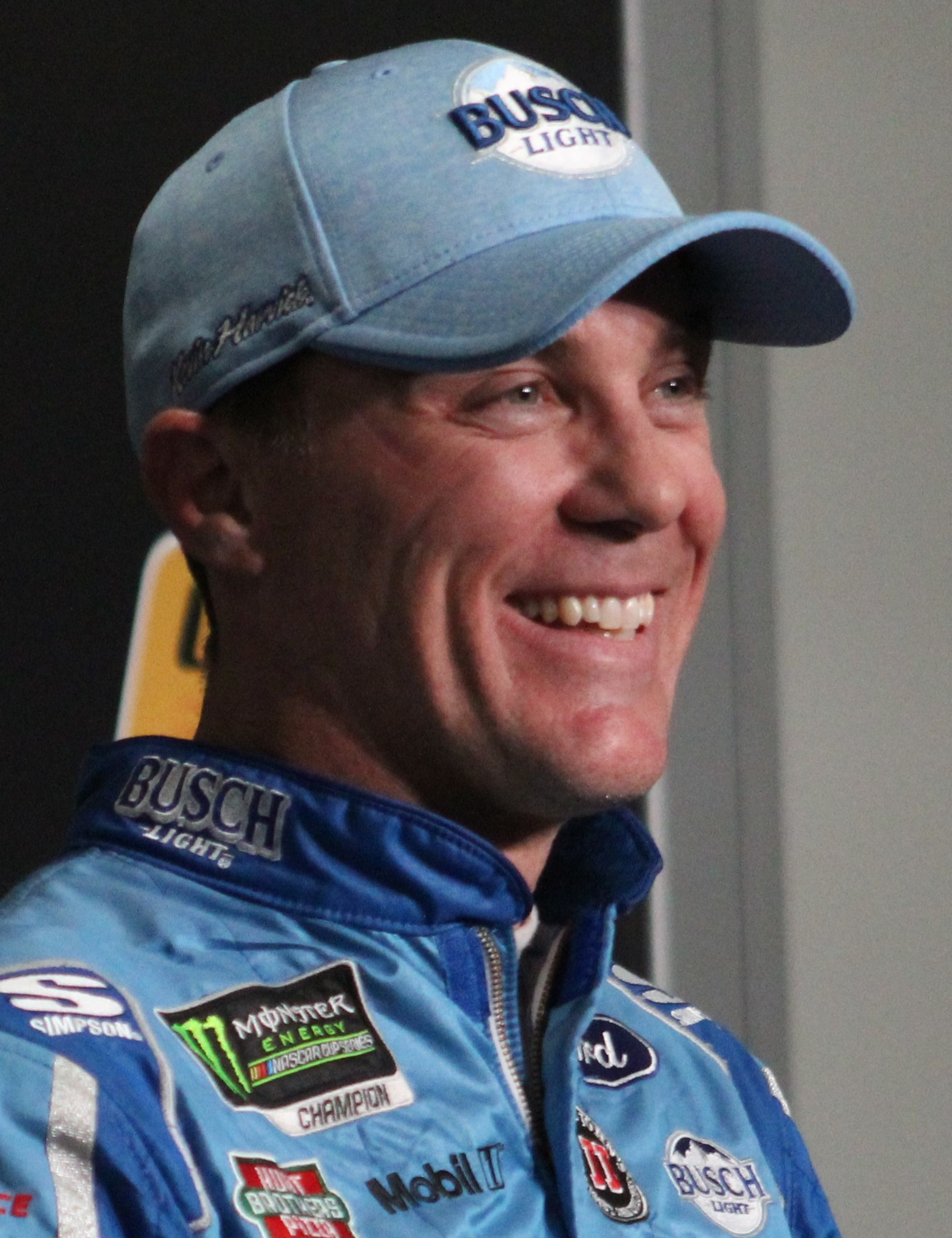
Kevin Harvick won the race.

=== Stage Results ===
Stage One Laps: 105

Pos	No	Driver	Team	Manufacturer	Points
1	19	Martin Truex Jr.	Joe Gibbs Racing	Toyota	10
2	18	Kyle Busch	Joe Gibbs Racing	Toyota	9
3	14	Clint Bowyer	Stewart-Haas Racing	Ford	8
4	11	Denny Hamlin	Joe Gibbs Racing	Toyota	7
5	4	Kevin Harvick	Stewart-Haas Racing	Ford	6
6	9	Chase Elliott	Hendrick Motorsports	Chevrolet	5
7	47	Ricky Stenhouse Jr.	JTG Daugherty Racing	Chevrolet	4
8	20	Erik Jones	Joe Gibbs Racing	Toyota	3
9	48	Jimmie Johnson	Hendrick Motorsports	Chevrolet	2
10	12	Ryan Blaney	Team Penske	Ford	1
Official stage one results

Stage Two Laps: 105

Pos	No	Driver	Team	Manufacturer	Points
1	19	Martin Truex Jr.	Joe Gibbs Racing	Toyota	10
2	12	Ryan Blaney	Team Penske	Ford	9
3	18	Kyle Busch	Joe Gibbs Racing	Toyota	8
4	11	Denny Hamlin	Joe Gibbs Racing	Toyota	7
5	9	Chase Elliott	Hendrick Motorsports	Chevrolet	6
6	4	Kevin Harvick	Stewart-Haas Racing	Ford	5
7	21	Matt DiBenedetto	Wood Brothers Racing	Ford	4
8	2	Brad Keselowski	Team Penske	Ford	3
9	14	Clint Bowyer	Stewart-Haas Racing	Ford	2
10	48	Jimmie Johnson	Hendrick Motorsports	Chevrolet	1
Official stage two results

=== Final Stage Results ===
Stage Three Laps: 115

Pos	Grid	No	Driver	Team	Manufacturer	Laps	Points
1	9	4	Kevin Harvick	Stewart-Haas Racing	Ford	325	51
2	4	18	Kyle Busch	Joe Gibbs Racing	Toyota	325	52
3	11	19	Martin Truex Jr.	Joe Gibbs Racing	Toyota	325	54
4	7	12	Ryan Blaney	Team Penske	Ford	325	43
5	10	11	Denny Hamlin	Joe Gibbs Racing	Toyota	325	46
6	12	1	Kurt Busch	Chip Ganassi Racing	Chevrolet	325	31
7	15	48	Jimmie Johnson	Hendrick Motorsports	Chevrolet	325	33
8	1	9	Chase Elliott	Hendrick Motorsports	Chevrolet	325	40
9	6	2	Brad Keselowski	Team Penske	Ford	325	31
10	3	22	Joey Logano	Team Penske	Ford	325	27
11	16	3	Austin Dillon	Richard Childress Racing	Chevrolet	324	26
12	8	88	Alex Bowman	Hendrick Motorsports	Chevrolet	324	25
13	22	47	Ricky Stenhouse Jr.	JTG Daugherty Racing	Chevrolet	324	28
14	17	6	Ryan Newman	Roush Fenway Racing	Ford	324	23
15	19	42	Matt Kenseth	Chip Ganassi Racing	Chevrolet	324	22
16	24	8	Tyler Reddick (R)	Richard Childress Racing	Chevrolet	324	21
17	2	10	Aric Almirola	Stewart-Haas Racing	Ford	324	20
18	27	95	Christopher Bell (R)	Leavine Family Racing	Toyota	324	19
19	31	41	Cole Custer (R)	Stewart-Haas Racing	Ford	324	18
20	5	14	Clint Bowyer	Stewart-Haas Racing	Ford	324	27
21	23	43	Bubba Wallace	Richard Petty Motorsports	Chevrolet	324	16
22	13	17	Chris Buescher	Roush Fenway Racing	Ford	324	15
23	18	38	John Hunter Nemechek (R)	Front Row Motorsports	Ford	324	14
24	36	34	Michael McDowell	Front Row Motorsports	Ford	324	13
25	21	21	Matt DiBenedetto	Wood Brothers Racing	Ford	324	16
26	29	37	Ryan Preece	JTG Daugherty Racing	Chevrolet	323	11
27	25	32	Corey LaJoie	Go Fas Racing	Ford	323	10
28	14	20	Erik Jones	Joe Gibbs Racing	Toyota	322	12
29	28	13	Ty Dillon	Germain Racing	Chevrolet	322	8
30	33	15	Brennan Poole (R)	Premium Motorsports	Chevrolet	321	7
31	37	96	Daniel Suárez	Gaunt Brothers Racing	Toyota	316	6
32	35	00	Quin Houff (R)	StarCom Racing	Chevrolet	314	5
33	20	24	William Byron	Hendrick Motorsports	Chevrolet	313	4
34	32	27	Josh Bilicki (i)	Rick Ware Racing	Ford	313	0
35	34	53	Garrett Smithley (i)	Rick Ware Racing	Chevrolet	312	0
36	30	77	J. J. Yeley (i)	Spire Motorsports	Chevrolet	311	0
37	40	7	Reed Sorenson	Tommy Baldwin Racing	Chevrolet	310	1
38	26	51	Joey Gase (i)	Petty Ware Racing	Ford	308	0
39	38	66	Timmy Hill (i)	MBM Motorsports	Toyota	259	0
40	39	78	B. J. McLeod (i)	B. J. McLeod Motorsports	Chevrolet	3	0
Official race results

=== Race statistics ===
- Lead changes: 21 among 9 different drivers
- Cautions/Laps: 5 for 24
- Red flags: 0
- Time of race: 3 hours, 30 minutes and 3 seconds
- Average speed: 142.966 miles per hour (230.081 km/h)

== Media ==
=== Television ===
The Folds of Honor QuikTrip 500 was carried by Fox in the United States. Mike Joy and five-time Atlanta winner Jeff Gordon covered the race from the Fox Sports studio in Charlotte. Jamie Little handled the pit road duties. Larry McReynolds provided insight from the Fox Sports studio in Charlotte.

Fox
Booth announcers	Pit reporter	In-race analyst
Lap-by-lap: Mike Joy; Color-commentator: Jeff Gordon	Jamie Little	Larry McReynolds

=== Radio ===
The race was broadcast on radio by the Performance Racing Network and simulcast on Sirius XM NASCAR Radio. Doug Rice and Mark Garrow called the race from the booth when the field raced down the front stretch. Rob Albright called the race from atop a billboard outside of turn 2 when the field raced through turns 1 and 2 & Pat Patterson called the race from a billboard outside of turn 3 when the field raced through turns 3 and 4. On pit road, PRN was manned by Brad Gillie, Brett McMillan and Doug Turnbull.

PRN
Booth announcers	Turn announcers	Pit reporters
Lead announcer: Doug Rice; Announcer: Mark Garrow	Turns 1 & 2: Rob Albright; Turns 3 & 4: Pat Patterson	Brad Gillie; Brett McMillan; Doug Turnbull

== Standings after the race ==
Drivers' Championship standings

	Pos	Driver	Points
	1	Kevin Harvick	421
	2	Joey Logano	373 (–48)
	3	Chase Elliott	365 (–56)
	4	Brad Keselowski	346 (–75)
1	5	Martin Truex Jr.	334 (–87)
1	6	Denny Hamlin	322 (–99)
1	7	Ryan Blaney	317 (–104)
3	8	Alex Bowman	314 (–107)
	9	Kyle Busch	308 (–113)
	10	Kurt Busch	284 (–137)
	11	Aric Almirola	260 (–161)
	12	Clint Bowyer	259 (–162)
2	13	Jimmie Johnson	256 (–165)
2	14	Austin Dillon	247 (–174)
2	15	Matt DiBenedetto	246 (–175)
2	16	Erik Jones	240 (–181)
Official driver's standings

Manufacturers' Championship standings

Pos	Manufacturer	Points
1	Ford	375
2	Chevrolet	341 (–34)
3	Toyota	339 (–36)

- Note: Only the first 16 positions are included for the driver standings.
- . – Driver has clinched a position in the NASCAR Cup Series playoffs.

Previous race: 2020 Supermarket Heroes 500	NASCAR Cup Series; 2020 season	Next race: 2020 Blue-Emu Maximum Pain Relief 500
