= 2020 Dixie Vodka 400 =

NASCAR Cup Series race

Race details
- Race 12 of 36 in the 2020 NASCAR Cup Series
- 2020 Dixie Vodka 400 program cover
- Date: June 14, 2020
- Location: Homestead–Miami Speedway in Homestead, Florida
- Course: Permanent racing facility
- Course length: 1.5 miles (2.4 km)
- Distance: 267 laps, 400.5 mi (640.8 km)
- Average speed: 127.751 miles per hour (205.595 km/h)

Pole position
Driver	Denny Hamlin	Joe Gibbs Racing
- Grid positions set by ballot

Most laps led
Driver	Denny Hamlin	Joe Gibbs Racing
- Laps: 137

Winner
No. 11	Denny Hamlin	Joe Gibbs Racing

Television in the United States
- Network: Fox
- Announcers: Mike Joy and Jeff Gordon
- Nielsen ratings: 2.775 million

Radio in the United States
- Radio: MRN
- Booth announcers: Alex Hayden and Jeff Striegle
- Turn announcers: Dave Moody (1 & 2) and Mike Bagley (3 & 4)

The 2020 Dixie Vodka 400 was a NASCAR Cup Series race that was originally scheduled to be held on March 22, 2020 and was rescheduled to June 14, 2020, at Homestead–Miami Speedway in Homestead, Florida. On March 13, 2020, NASCAR announced that they would postpone the race due to the COVID-19 pandemic.

Contested over 267 laps on the 1.5 mile (2.4 km) oval, it was 12th race of the 2020 NASCAR Cup Series season.

== Report ==
=== Background ===
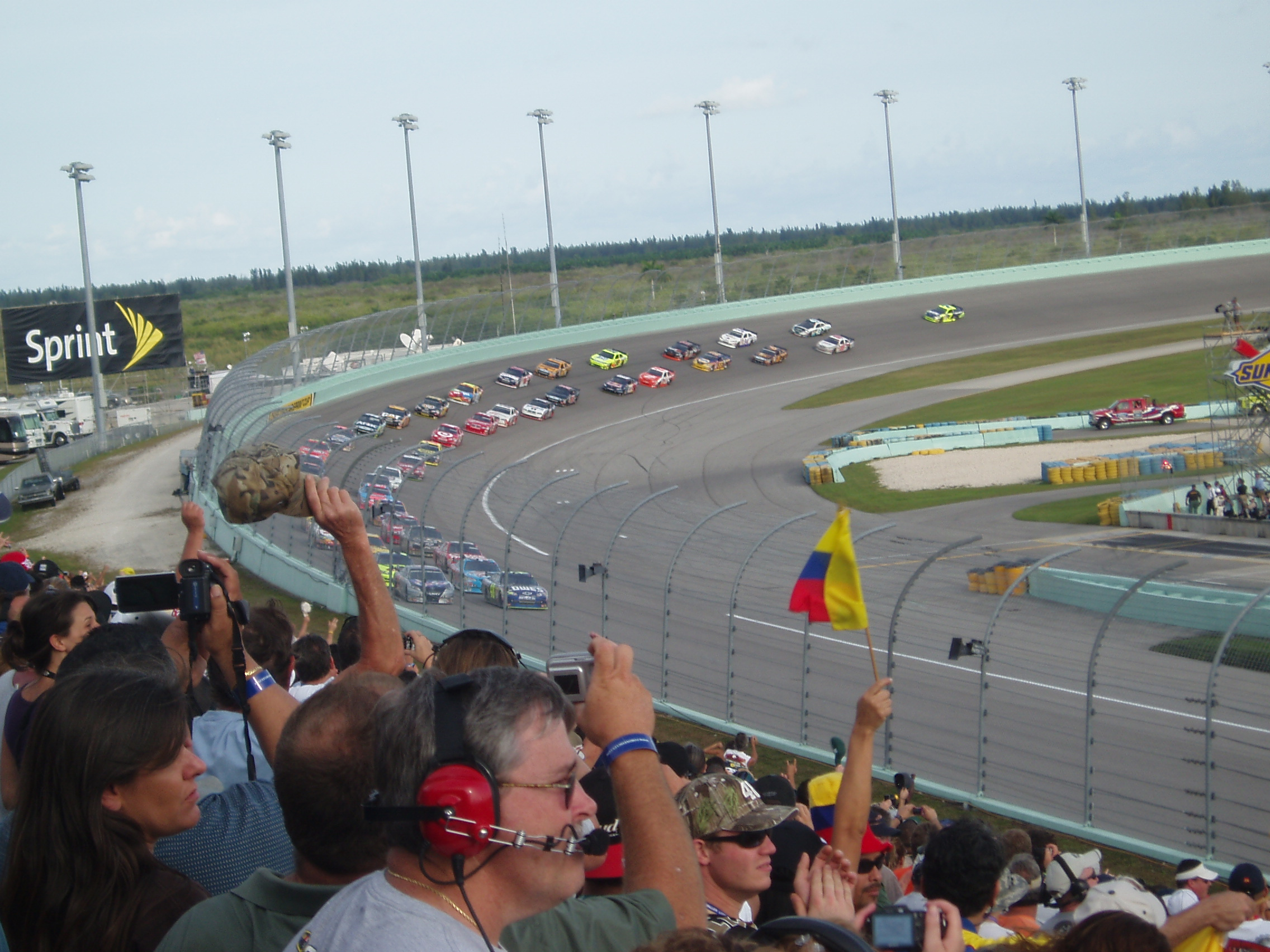
Homestead-Miami Speedway, the track where the race was held.

Homestead-Miami Speedway is a motor racing track located in Homestead, Florida. The track, which has several configurations, has promoted several series of racing, including NASCAR, the NTT IndyCar Series and the Grand-Am Rolex Sports Car Series

From 2002 to 2019, Homestead-Miami Speedway hosted the final race of the season in all three of NASCAR's series: the NASCAR Cup Series, Xfinity Series and Gander RV & Outdoors Truck Series.

After having held races closed to spectators since The Real Heroes 400 in May due to the pandemic, the Dixie Vodka 400 was the first NASCAR event to admit a limited number of outside spectators (albeit still closed to the public). The race was held before an audience of 1,000 United States Armed Forces members from South Florida, representing the Homestead Air Reserve Base and the United States Southern Command.

==== Entry list ====
- (R) denotes rookie driver.
- (i) denotes driver who are ineligible for series driver points.

No.	Driver	Team	Manufacturer
00	Quin Houff (R)	StarCom Racing	Chevrolet
1	Kurt Busch	Chip Ganassi Racing	Chevrolet
2	Brad Keselowski	Team Penske	Ford
3	Austin Dillon	Richard Childress Racing	Chevrolet
4	Kevin Harvick	Stewart-Haas Racing	Ford
6	Ryan Newman	Roush Fenway Racing	Ford
8	Tyler Reddick (R)	Richard Childress Racing	Chevrolet
9	Chase Elliott	Hendrick Motorsports	Chevrolet
10	Aric Almirola	Stewart-Haas Racing	Ford
11	Denny Hamlin	Joe Gibbs Racing	Toyota
12	Ryan Blaney	Team Penske	Ford
13	Ty Dillon	Germain Racing	Chevrolet
14	Clint Bowyer	Stewart-Haas Racing	Ford
15	Brennan Poole (R)	Premium Motorsports	Chevrolet
17	Chris Buescher	Roush Fenway Racing	Ford
18	Kyle Busch	Joe Gibbs Racing	Toyota
19	Martin Truex Jr.	Joe Gibbs Racing	Toyota
20	Erik Jones	Joe Gibbs Racing	Toyota
21	Matt DiBenedetto	Wood Brothers Racing	Ford
22	Joey Logano	Team Penske	Ford
24	William Byron	Hendrick Motorsports	Chevrolet
27	J. J. Yeley (i)	Rick Ware Racing	Ford
32	Corey LaJoie	Go Fas Racing	Ford
34	Michael McDowell	Front Row Motorsports	Ford
37	Ryan Preece	JTG Daugherty Racing	Chevrolet
38	John Hunter Nemechek (R)	Front Row Motorsports	Ford
41	Cole Custer (R)	Stewart-Haas Racing	Ford
42	Matt Kenseth	Chip Ganassi Racing	Chevrolet
43	Bubba Wallace	Richard Petty Motorsports	Chevrolet
47	Ricky Stenhouse Jr.	JTG Daugherty Racing	Chevrolet
48	Jimmie Johnson	Hendrick Motorsports	Chevrolet
51	Joey Gase (i)	Petty Ware Racing	Ford
53	Josh Bilicki (i)	Rick Ware Racing	Chevrolet
66	Timmy Hill (i)	MBM Motorsports	Toyota
77	B. J. McLeod (i)	Spire Motorsports	Chevrolet
88	Alex Bowman	Hendrick Motorsports	Chevrolet
95	Christopher Bell (R)	Leavine Family Racing	Toyota
96	Daniel Suárez	Gaunt Brothers Racing	Toyota
Official entry list

== Qualifying ==
Denny Hamlin was awarded the pole for the race as determined by a random draw.

=== Starting Lineup ===
Pos	No.	Driver	Team	Manufacturer
1	11	Denny Hamlin	Joe Gibbs Racing	Toyota
2	22	Joey Logano	Team Penske	Ford
3	2	Brad Keselowski	Team Penske	Ford
4	18	Kyle Busch	Joe Gibbs Racing	Toyota
5	9	Chase Elliott	Hendrick Motorsports	Chevrolet
6	19	Martin Truex Jr.	Joe Gibbs Racing	Toyota
7	4	Kevin Harvick	Stewart-Haas Racing	Ford
8	88	Alex Bowman	Hendrick Motorsports	Chevrolet
9	48	Jimmie Johnson	Hendrick Motorsports	Chevrolet
10	1	Kurt Busch	Chip Ganassi Racing	Chevrolet
11	12	Ryan Blaney	Team Penske	Ford
12	14	Clint Bowyer	Stewart-Haas Racing	Ford
13	17	Chris Buescher	Roush Fenway Racing	Ford
14	6	Ryan Newman	Roush Fenway Racing	Ford
15	20	Erik Jones	Joe Gibbs Racing	Toyota
16	3	Austin Dillon	Richard Childress Racing	Chevrolet
17	43	Bubba Wallace	Richard Petty Motorsports	Chevrolet
18	38	John Hunter Nemechek (R)	Front Row Motorsports	Ford
19	47	Ricky Stenhouse Jr.	JTG Daugherty Racing	Chevrolet
20	42	Matt Kenseth	Chip Ganassi Racing	Chevrolet
21	10	Aric Almirola	Stewart-Haas Racing	Ford
22	24	William Byron	Hendrick Motorsports	Chevrolet
23	21	Matt DiBenedetto	Wood Brothers Racing	Ford
24	8	Tyler Reddick (R)	Richard Childress Racing	Chevrolet
25	27	J. J. Yeley (i)	Rick Ware Racing	Ford
26	32	Corey LaJoie	Go Fas Racing	Ford
27	53	Josh Bilicki (i)	Rick Ware Racing	Chevrolet
28	15	Brennan Poole (R)	Premium Motorsports	Chevrolet
29	51	Joey Gase (i)	Petty Ware Racing	Ford
30	34	Michael McDowell	Front Row Motorsports	Ford
31	00	Quin Houff (R)	StarCom Racing	Chevrolet
32	13	Ty Dillon	Germain Racing	Chevrolet
33	37	Ryan Preece	JTG Daugherty Racing	Chevrolet
34	77	B. J. McLeod (i)	Spire Motorsports	Chevrolet
35	41	Cole Custer (R)	Stewart-Haas Racing	Ford
36	95	Christopher Bell (R)	Leavine Family Racing	Toyota
37	96	Daniel Suárez	Gaunt Brothers Racing	Toyota
38	66	Timmy Hill (i)	MBM Motorsports	Toyota
Official starting lineup

== Race ==
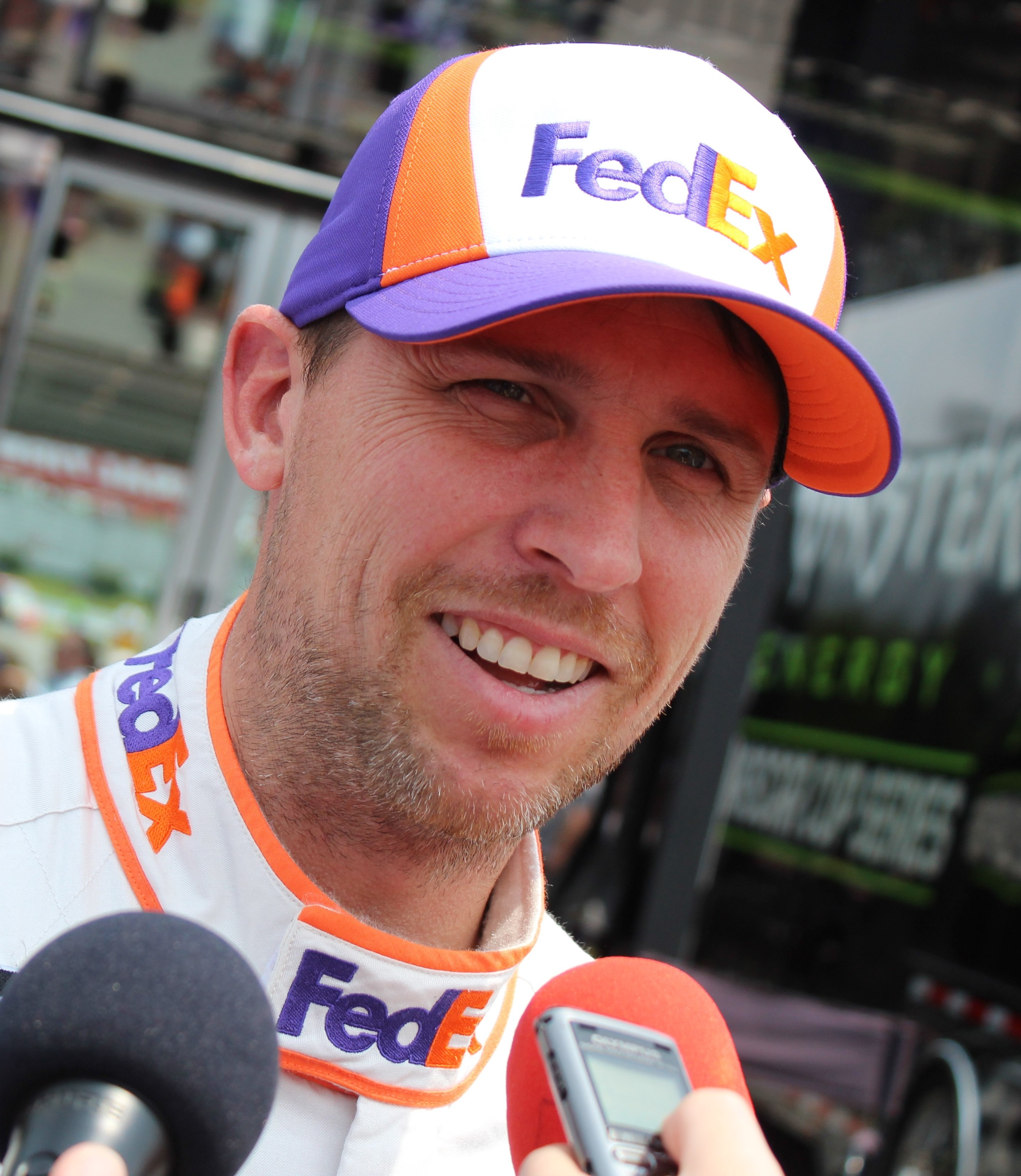
Denny Hamlin won the race.

=== Stage Results ===
Stage One Laps: 80

Pos	No	Driver	Team	Manufacturer	Points
1	11	Denny Hamlin	Joe Gibbs Racing	Toyota	10
2	12	Ryan Blaney	Team Penske	Ford	9
3	8	Tyler Reddick (R)	Richard Childress Racing	Chevrolet	8
4	9	Chase Elliott	Hendrick Motorsports	Chevrolet	7
5	10	Aric Almirola	Stewart-Haas Racing	Ford	6
6	2	Brad Keselowski	Team Penske	Ford	5
7	88	Alex Bowman	Hendrick Motorsports	Chevrolet	4
8	24	William Byron	Hendrick Motorsports	Chevrolet	3
9	14	Clint Bowyer	Stewart-Haas Racing	Ford	2
10	17	Chris Buescher	Roush Fenway Racing	Ford	1
Official stage one results

Stage Two Laps: 80

Pos	No	Driver	Team	Manufacturer	Points
1	11	Denny Hamlin	Joe Gibbs Racing	Toyota	10
2	8	Tyler Reddick (R)	Richard Childress Racing	Chevrolet	9
3	9	Chase Elliott	Hendrick Motorsports	Chevrolet	8
4	12	Ryan Blaney	Team Penske	Ford	7
5	24	William Byron	Hendrick Motorsports	Chevrolet	6
6	88	Alex Bowman	Hendrick Motorsports	Chevrolet	5
7	19	Martin Truex Jr.	Joe Gibbs Racing	Toyota	4
8	3	Austin Dillon	Richard Childress Racing	Chevrolet	3
9	18	Kyle Busch	Joe Gibbs Racing	Toyota	2
10	10	Aric Almirola	Stewart-Haas Racing	Ford	1
Official stage two results

=== Final Stage Results ===
Stage Three Laps: 107

Pos	Grid	No	Driver	Team	Manufacturer	Laps	Points
1	1	11	Denny Hamlin	Joe Gibbs Racing	Toyota	267	60
2	5	9	Chase Elliott	Hendrick Motorsports	Chevrolet	267	50
3	11	12	Ryan Blaney	Team Penske	Ford	267	50
4	24	8	Tyler Reddick (R)	Richard Childress Racing	Chevrolet	267	50
5	21	10	Aric Almirola	Stewart-Haas Racing	Ford	267	39
6	4	18	Kyle Busch	Joe Gibbs Racing	Toyota	267	33
7	16	3	Austin Dillon	Richard Childress Racing	Chevrolet	267	33
8	36	95	Christopher Bell (R)	Leavine Family Racing	Toyota	267	29
9	22	24	William Byron	Hendrick Motorsports	Chevrolet	267	37
10	3	2	Brad Keselowski	Team Penske	Ford	267	32
11	12	14	Clint Bowyer	Stewart-Haas Racing	Ford	267	28
12	6	19	Martin Truex Jr.	Joe Gibbs Racing	Toyota	267	29
13	17	43	Bubba Wallace	Richard Petty Motorsports	Chevrolet	267	24
14	23	21	Matt DiBenedetto	Wood Brothers Racing	Ford	267	23
15	30	34	Michael McDowell	Front Row Motorsports	Ford	267	22
16	9	48	Jimmie Johnson	Hendrick Motorsports	Chevrolet	266	21
17	10	1	Kurt Busch	Chip Ganassi Racing	Chevrolet	266	20
18	8	88	Alex Bowman	Hendrick Motorsports	Chevrolet	266	28
19	18	38	John Hunter Nemechek (R)	Front Row Motorsports	Ford	266	18
20	19	47	Ricky Stenhouse Jr.	JTG Daugherty Racing	Chevrolet	266	17
21	15	20	Erik Jones	Joe Gibbs Racing	Toyota	266	16
22	35	41	Cole Custer (R)	Stewart-Haas Racing	Ford	266	15
23	13	17	Chris Buescher	Roush Fenway Racing	Ford	266	15
24	33	37	Ryan Preece	JTG Daugherty Racing	Chevrolet	266	13
25	20	42	Matt Kenseth	Chip Ganassi Racing	Chevrolet	266	12
26	7	4	Kevin Harvick	Stewart-Haas Racing	Ford	266	11
27	2	22	Joey Logano	Team Penske	Ford	265	10
28	32	13	Ty Dillon	Germain Racing	Chevrolet	265	9
29	26	32	Corey LaJoie	Go Fas Racing	Ford	264	8
30	14	6	Ryan Newman	Roush Fenway Racing	Ford	263	7
31	37	96	Daniel Suárez	Gaunt Brothers Racing	Toyota	263	6
32	28	15	Brennan Poole (R)	Premium Motorsports	Chevrolet	260	5
33	31	00	Quin Houff (R)	StarCom Racing	Chevrolet	259	4
34	38	66	Timmy Hill (i)	MBM Motorsports	Toyota	257	0
35	34	77	B. J. McLeod (i)	Spire Motorsports	Chevrolet	256	0
36	29	51	Joey Gase (i)	Petty Ware Racing	Ford	255	0
37	27	53	Josh Bilicki (i)	Rick Ware Racing	Chevrolet	245	0
38	25	27	J. J. Yeley (i)	Rick Ware Racing	Ford	211	0
Official race results

=== Race statistics ===
- Lead changes: 18 among 7 different drivers
- Cautions/Laps: 6 for 27
- Red flags: 2 for 2 hours, 46 minutes and 48 seconds
- Time of race: 3 hours, 8 minutes and 6 seconds
- Average speed: 127.751 miles per hour (205.595 km/h)

== Media ==
=== Television ===
The Dixie Vodka 400 was carried by Fox in the United States. Mike Joy and 2012 Homestead winner Jeff Gordon covered the race from the Fox Sports studio in Charlotte. Matt Yocum handled the pit road duties. Larry McReynolds provided insight from the Fox Sports studio in Charlotte.

Fox
Booth announcers	Pit reporter	In-race analyst
Lap-by-lap: Mike Joy; Color-commentator: Jeff Gordon	Matt Yocum	Larry McReynolds

=== Radio ===
MRN had the radio call for the race, which was simulcast on Sirius XM NASCAR Radio. Alex Hayden and Jeff Striegle called the action of the race for MRN when the field raced down the front straightaway. Dave Moody covered the action for MRN in turns 1 & 2, and Mike Bagley had the call of the action from turns 3 & 4. Winston Kelley and Steve Post covered the action of the race for MRN on pit road.

MRN
Booth announcers	Turn announcers	Pit reporters
Lead announcer: Alex Hayden; Announcer: Jeff Striegle	Turns 1 & 2: Dave Moody; Turns 3 & 4: Mike Bagley	Winston Kelley; Steve Post

== Standings after the race ==
Drivers' Championship standings

	Pos	Driver	Points
	1	Kevin Harvick	463
1	2	Chase Elliott	455 (–8)
1	3	Joey Logano	434 (–29)
1	4	Brad Keselowski	412 (–51)
1	5	Ryan Blaney	411 (–52)
2	6	Martin Truex Jr.	410 (–53)
1	7	Denny Hamlin	395 (–68)
1	8	Alex Bowman	380 (–83)
	9	Kyle Busch	359 (–104)
	10	Kurt Busch	338 (–125)
	11	Jimmie Johnson	322 (–141)
	12	Clint Bowyer	316 (–147)
1	13	Aric Almirola	303 (–160)
1	14	Matt DiBenedetto	301 (–162)
1	15	William Byron	291 (–172)
1	16	Austin Dillon	281 (–182)
Official driver's standings

Manufacturers' Championship standings

Pos	Manufacturer	Points
1	Ford	444
2	Toyota	419 (–25)
3	Chevrolet	408 (–36)

- Note: Only the first 16 positions are included for the driver standings.
- . – Driver has clinched a position in the NASCAR Cup Series playoffs.

Previous race: 2020 Blue-Emu Maximum Pain Relief 500	NASCAR Cup Series; 2020 season	Next race: 2020 GEICO 500
