= 2020 Blue-Emu Maximum Pain Relief 500 =

NASCAR Cup Series race

Race details
- Race 11 of 36 in the 2020 NASCAR Cup Series
- The 2020 Blue-Emu Maximum Pain Relief 500 program cover.
- Date: June 10, 2020
- Location: Martinsville Speedway in Ridgeway, Virginia
- Course: Permanent racing facility
- Course length: 0.847 km (0.526 miles)
- Distance: 500 laps, 263 mi (423.5 km)
- Average speed: 77.378 miles per hour (124.528 km/h)

Pole position
Driver	Ryan Blaney	Team Penske
- Grid positions set by ballot

Most laps led
Driver	Joey Logano	Team Penske
- Laps: 234

Winner
No. 19	Martin Truex Jr.	Joe Gibbs Racing

Television in the United States
- Network: FS1
- Announcers: Mike Joy and Jeff Gordon
- Nielsen ratings: 1.711 million

Radio in the United States
- Radio: MRN
- Booth announcers: Alex Hayden, Dave Moody, and Rusty Wallace
- Turn announcers: Dillon Welch (Backstretch)

The 2020 Blue-Emu Maximum Pain Relief 500 was a NASCAR Cup Series race that was originally scheduled to be held on May 9, 2020, and was rescheduled to June 10, 2020, at Martinsville Speedway in Ridgeway, Virginia. Contested over 500 laps on the 0.526 miles (0.847 km) paperclip-shaped short track, it was the 11th race of the 2020 NASCAR Cup Series season.

== Report ==
=== Background ===
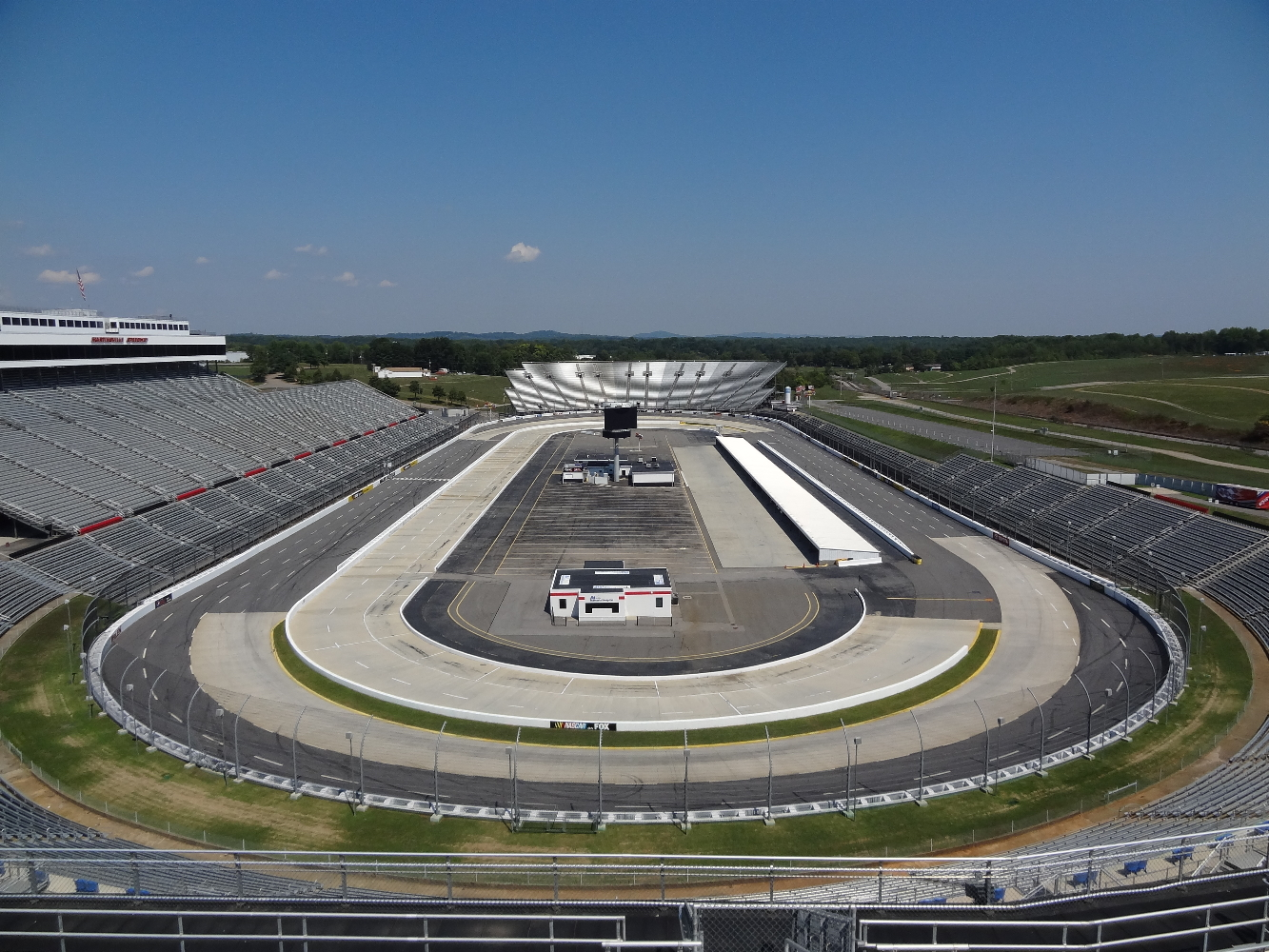
Martinsville Speedway, the track where the race was held.

Martinsville Speedway is an International Speedway Corporation-owned NASCAR stock car racing track located in Henry County, in Ridgeway, Virginia, just to the south of Martinsville. At 0.526 miles (0.847 km) in length, it is the shortest track in the NASCAR Cup Series. The track was also one of the first paved oval tracks in NASCAR, being built in 1947 by H. Clay Earles. It is also the only remaining race track that has been on the NASCAR circuit from its beginning in 1948. Due to the ongoing COVID-19 pandemic, the race will be held behind closed doors with no fans in attendance with only essential staff present, guidelines for social distancing and use of the protective equipment equipped by team staff, and logging to help with the contact tracing efforts.

==== Entry list ====
- (R) denotes rookie driver.
- (i) denotes driver who are ineligible for series driver points.

No.	Driver	Team	Manufacturer
00	Quin Houff (R)	StarCom Racing	Chevrolet
1	Kurt Busch	Chip Ganassi Racing	Chevrolet
2	Brad Keselowski	Team Penske	Ford
3	Austin Dillon	Richard Childress Racing	Chevrolet
4	Kevin Harvick	Stewart-Haas Racing	Ford
6	Ryan Newman	Roush Fenway Racing	Ford
7	Reed Sorenson	Tommy Baldwin Racing	Chevrolet
8	Tyler Reddick (R)	Richard Childress Racing	Chevrolet
9	Chase Elliott	Hendrick Motorsports	Chevrolet
10	Aric Almirola	Stewart-Haas Racing	Ford
11	Denny Hamlin	Joe Gibbs Racing	Toyota
12	Ryan Blaney	Team Penske	Ford
13	Ty Dillon	Germain Racing	Chevrolet
14	Clint Bowyer	Stewart-Haas Racing	Ford
15	Brennan Poole (R)	Premium Motorsports	Chevrolet
17	Chris Buescher	Roush Fenway Racing	Ford
18	Kyle Busch	Joe Gibbs Racing	Toyota
19	Martin Truex Jr.	Joe Gibbs Racing	Toyota
20	Erik Jones	Joe Gibbs Racing	Toyota
21	Matt DiBenedetto	Wood Brothers Racing	Ford
22	Joey Logano	Team Penske	Ford
24	William Byron	Hendrick Motorsports	Chevrolet
27	J. J. Yeley (i)	Rick Ware Racing	Ford
32	Corey LaJoie	Go Fas Racing	Ford
34	Michael McDowell	Front Row Motorsports	Ford
37	Ryan Preece	JTG Daugherty Racing	Chevrolet
38	John Hunter Nemechek (R)	Front Row Motorsports	Ford
41	Cole Custer (R)	Stewart-Haas Racing	Ford
42	Matt Kenseth	Chip Ganassi Racing	Chevrolet
43	Bubba Wallace	Richard Petty Motorsports	Chevrolet
47	Ricky Stenhouse Jr.	JTG Daugherty Racing	Chevrolet
48	Jimmie Johnson	Hendrick Motorsports	Chevrolet
51	Joey Gase (i)	Petty Ware Racing	Chevrolet
53	David Starr (i)	Rick Ware Racing	Chevrolet
66	Timmy Hill (i)	MBM Motorsports	Toyota
77	Garrett Smithley (i)	Spire Motorsports	Chevrolet
88	Alex Bowman	Hendrick Motorsports	Chevrolet
95	Christopher Bell (R)	Leavine Family Racing	Toyota
96	Daniel Suárez	Gaunt Brothers Racing	Toyota
Official entry list

== Qualifying ==
Ryan Blaney was awarded the pole for the race as determined by a random draw.

=== Starting Lineup ===
Pos	No.	Driver	Team	Manufacturer
1	12	Ryan Blaney	Team Penske	Ford
2	10	Aric Almirola	Stewart-Haas Racing	Ford
3	22	Joey Logano	Team Penske	Ford
4	14	Clint Bowyer	Stewart-Haas Racing	Ford
5	19	Martin Truex Jr.	Joe Gibbs Racing	Toyota
6	2	Brad Keselowski	Team Penske	Ford
7	18	Kyle Busch	Joe Gibbs Racing	Toyota
8	88	Alex Bowman	Hendrick Motorsports	Chevrolet
9	1	Kurt Busch	Chip Ganassi Racing	Chevrolet
10	4	Kevin Harvick	Stewart-Haas Racing	Ford
11	9	Chase Elliott	Hendrick Motorsports	Chevrolet
12	11	Denny Hamlin	Joe Gibbs Racing	Toyota
13	20	Erik Jones	Joe Gibbs Racing	Toyota
14	8	Tyler Reddick (R)	Richard Childress Racing	Chevrolet
15	24	William Byron	Hendrick Motorsports	Chevrolet
16	6	Ryan Newman	Roush Fenway Racing	Ford
17	47	Ricky Stenhouse Jr.	JTG Daugherty Racing	Chevrolet
18	38	John Hunter Nemechek (R)	Front Row Motorsports	Ford
19	21	Matt DiBenedetto	Wood Brothers Racing	Ford
20	42	Matt Kenseth	Chip Ganassi Racing	Chevrolet
21	48	Jimmie Johnson	Hendrick Motorsports	Chevrolet
22	3	Austin Dillon	Richard Childress Racing	Chevrolet
23	43	Bubba Wallace	Richard Petty Motorsports	Chevrolet
24	17	Chris Buescher	Roush Fenway Racing	Ford
25	32	Corey LaJoie	Go Fas Racing	Ford
26	27	J. J. Yeley (i)	Rick Ware Racing	Ford
27	41	Cole Custer (R)	Stewart-Haas Racing	Ford
28	37	Ryan Preece	JTG Daugherty Racing	Chevrolet
29	34	Michael McDowell	Front Row Motorsports	Ford
30	13	Ty Dillon	Germain Racing	Chevrolet
31	15	Brennan Poole (R)	Premium Motorsports	Chevrolet
32	95	Christopher Bell (R)	Leavine Family Racing	Toyota
33	53	David Starr (i)	Rick Ware Racing	Chevrolet
34	00	Quin Houff (R)	StarCom Racing	Chevrolet
35	77	Garrett Smithley (i)	Spire Motorsports	Chevrolet
36	51	Joey Gase (i)	Petty Ware Racing	Chevrolet
37	96	Daniel Suárez	Gaunt Brothers Racing	Toyota
38	66	Timmy Hill (i)	MBM Motorsports	Toyota
39	7	Reed Sorenson	Tommy Baldwin Racing	Chevrolet
Official starting lineup

== Race ==
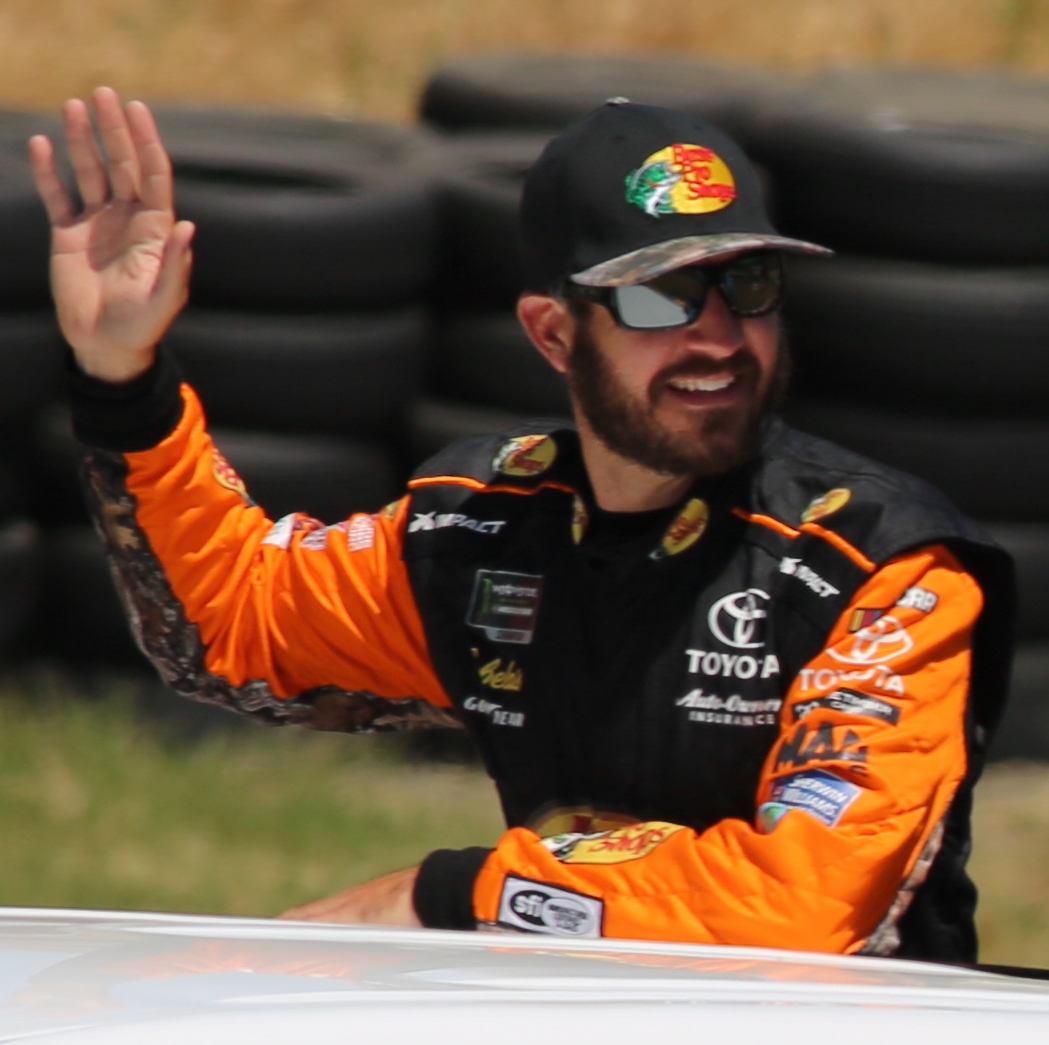
Martin Truex Jr. won the race.

=== Stage Results ===
Stage One Laps: 130

Pos	No	Driver	Team	Manufacturer	Points
1	22	Joey Logano	Team Penske	Ford	10
2	14	Clint Bowyer	Stewart-Haas Racing	Ford	9
3	48	Jimmie Johnson	Hendrick Motorsports	Chevrolet	8
4	19	Martin Truex Jr.	Joe Gibbs Racing	Toyota	7
5	43	Bubba Wallace	Richard Petty Motorsports	Chevrolet	6
6	9	Chase Elliott	Hendrick Motorsports	Chevrolet	5
7	1	Kurt Busch	Chip Ganassi Racing	Chevrolet	4
8	4	Kevin Harvick	Stewart-Haas Racing	Ford	3
9	21	Matt DiBenedetto	Wood Brothers Racing	Ford	2
10	24	William Byron	Hendrick Motorsports	Chevrolet	1
Official stage one results

Stage Two Laps: 130

Pos	No	Driver	Team	Manufacturer	Points
1	48	Jimmie Johnson	Hendrick Motorsports	Chevrolet	10
2	12	Ryan Blaney	Team Penske	Ford	9
3	22	Joey Logano	Team Penske	Ford	8
4	88	Alex Bowman	Hendrick Motorsports	Chevrolet	7
5	4	Kevin Harvick	Stewart-Haas Racing	Ford	6
6	43	Bubba Wallace	Richard Petty Motorsports	Chevrolet	5
7	24	William Byron	Hendrick Motorsports	Chevrolet	4
8	9	Chase Elliott	Hendrick Motorsports	Chevrolet	3
9	1	Kurt Busch	Chip Ganassi Racing	Chevrolet	2
10	8	Tyler Reddick (R)	Richard Childress Racing	Chevrolet	1
Official stage two results

=== Final Stage Results ===
Stage Three Laps: 240

Pos	Grid	No	Driver	Team	Manufacturer	Laps	Points
1	5	19	Martin Truex Jr.	Joe Gibbs Racing	Toyota	500	47
2	1	12	Ryan Blaney	Team Penske	Ford	500	44
3	6	2	Brad Keselowski	Team Penske	Ford	500	34
4	3	22	Joey Logano	Team Penske	Ford	500	51
5	11	9	Chase Elliott	Hendrick Motorsports	Chevrolet	500	40
6	8	88	Alex Bowman	Hendrick Motorsports	Chevrolet	500	38
7	19	21	Matt DiBenedetto	Wood Brothers Racing	Ford	500	32
8	15	24	William Byron	Hendrick Motorsports	Chevrolet	500	34
9	9	1	Kurt Busch	Chip Ganassi Racing	Chevrolet	500	34
10	21	48	Jimmie Johnson	Hendrick Motorsports	Chevrolet	500	45
11	23	43	Bubba Wallace	Richard Petty Motorsports	Chevrolet	500	37
12	16	6	Ryan Newman	Roush Fenway Racing	Ford	500	25
13	24	17	Chris Buescher	Roush Fenway Racing	Ford	500	24
14	29	34	Michael McDowell	Front Row Motorsports	Ford	500	23
15	10	4	Kevin Harvick	Stewart-Haas Racing	Ford	499	31
16	14	8	Tyler Reddick (R)	Richard Childress Racing	Chevrolet	499	22
17	4	14	Clint Bowyer	Stewart-Haas Racing	Ford	499	29
18	25	32	Corey LaJoie	Go Fas Racing	Ford	499	19
19	7	18	Kyle Busch	Joe Gibbs Racing	Toyota	499	18
20	13	20	Erik Jones	Joe Gibbs Racing	Toyota	497	17
21	17	47	Ricky Stenhouse Jr.	JTG Daugherty Racing	Chevrolet	497	16
22	30	13	Ty Dillon	Germain Racing	Chevrolet	497	15
23	20	42	Matt Kenseth	Chip Ganassi Racing	Chevrolet	497	14
24	12	11	Denny Hamlin	Joe Gibbs Racing	Toyota	497	13
25	18	38	John Hunter Nemechek (R)	Front Row Motorsports	Ford	497	12
26	28	37	Ryan Preece	JTG Daugherty Racing	Chevrolet	496	11
27	37	96	Daniel Suárez	Gaunt Brothers Racing	Toyota	494	10
28	32	95	Christopher Bell (R)	Leavine Family Racing	Toyota	494	9
29	27	41	Cole Custer (R)	Stewart-Haas Racing	Ford	494	8
30	31	15	Brennan Poole (R)	Premium Motorsports	Chevrolet	494	7
31	26	27	J. J. Yeley (i)	Rick Ware Racing	Ford	493	0
32	33	53	David Starr (i)	Rick Ware Racing	Chevrolet	479	0
33	2	10	Aric Almirola	Stewart-Haas Racing	Ford	476	4
34	34	00	Quin Houff (R)	StarCom Racing	Chevrolet	474	3
35	36	51	Joey Gase (i)	Petty Ware Racing	Chevrolet	464	0
36	35	77	Garrett Smithley (i)	Spire Motorsports	Chevrolet	450	0
37	22	3	Austin Dillon	Richard Childress Racing	Chevrolet	399	1
38	39	7	Reed Sorenson	Tommy Baldwin Racing	Chevrolet	295	1
39	38	66	Timmy Hill (i)	MBM Motorsports	Toyota	105	0
Official race results

=== Race statistics ===
- Lead changes: 14 among 8 different drivers
- Cautions/Laps: 7 for 52
- Red flags: 0
- Time of race: 3 hours, 23 minutes and 56 seconds
- Average speed: 77.378 miles per hour (124.528 km/h)

== Media ==
=== Television ===
Fox Sports covered their 20th race at the Martinsville Speedway. Mike Joy and nine-time Martinsville winner Jeff Gordon will cover the race from the Fox Sports studio in Charlotte. Regan Smith handled the pit road duties. Larry McReynolds provided insight from the Fox Sports studio in Charlotte.

FS1
Booth announcers	Pit reporter	In-race analyst
Lap-by-lap: Mike Joy; Color-commentator: Jeff Gordon	Regan Smith	Larry McReynolds

=== Radio ===
MRN had the radio call for the race which was also simulcasted on Sirius XM NASCAR Radio. Alex Hayden, Dave Moody and seven-time Martinsville winner Rusty Wallace called the race in the booth as the cars raced down the frontstretch. Dillon Welch called the race from atop the turn 3 stands as the field raced down the backstretch. Steve Post worked pit road for the radio side.

MRN
Booth announcers	Turn announcers	Pit reporters
Lead announcer: Alex Hayden; Announcer: Dave Moody; Announcer: Rusty Wallace	Backstretch: Dillon Welch	Steve Post

== Standings after the race ==
Drivers' Championship standings

	Pos	Driver	Points
	1	Kevin Harvick	452
	2	Joey Logano	424 (–28)
	3	Chase Elliott	405 (–47)
1	4	Martin Truex Jr.	381 (–71)
1	5	Brad Keselowski	380 (–72)
1	6	Ryan Blaney	361 (–91)
1	7	Alex Bowman	352 (–100)
2	8	Denny Hamlin	335 (–117)
	9	Kyle Busch	326 (–126)
	10	Kurt Busch	318 (–134)
2	11	Jimmie Johnson	301 (–151)
	12	Clint Bowyer	288 (–164)
2	13	Matt DiBenedetto	278 (–174)
3	14	Aric Almirola	264 (–188)
1	15	Erik Jones	257 (–195)
1	16	William Byron	254 (–198)
Official driver's standings

Manufacturers' Championship standings

	Pos	Manufacturer	Points
	1	Ford	410
1	2	Toyota	379 (–31)
1	3	Chevrolet	373 (–37)

- Note: Only the first 16 positions are included for the driver standings.
- . – Driver has clinched a position in the NASCAR Cup Series playoffs.

Previous race: 2020 Folds of Honor QuikTrip 500	NASCAR Cup Series; 2020 season	Next race: 2020 Dixie Vodka 400
