= GK Racing =

NASCAR team

- Owner(s): Clay Greenfield; Tandra Greenfield; Jordan Kiss; Theresa Kiss; Billy Alger (former)
- Base: Clarksville, Tennessee
- Series: NASCAR Craftsman Truck Series
- Race drivers: 95. Clay Greenfield (part-time)
- Manufacturer: Chevrolet
- Opened: 2011

Career
- Debut: Craftsman Truck Series: 2011 WinStar World Casino 400 (Texas); ARCA Racing Series: 2015 Southern Illinois 100 (DuQuoin)
- Latest race: Craftsman Truck Series: 2026 Love's RV Stops 225 (Talladega); ARCA Racing Series: 2016 Berlin ARCA 200 (Berlin)
- Races competed: Craftsman Truck Series: 59; ARCA Racing Series: 4
- Drivers' Championships: 0
- Race victories: 0
- Pole positions: 0

GK Racing (formerly Clay Greenfield Motorsports and Alger Motorsports) is an American professional stock car racing team that competes part-time in the NASCAR Craftsman Truck Series, fielding the No. 95 Chevrolet Silverado for Clay Greenfield, who is also a co-owner of the team. The other co-owners of the team are Greenfield's wife Tandra, a former NFL cheerleader, and Jordan and Theresa Kiss, who own Backyard Blues Pools, one of the team's sponsors. The team was previously co-owned by Billy Alger, who drove for the team in what is now the ARCA Menards Series.

== Craftsman Truck Series ==
=== Truck No. 68 history ===
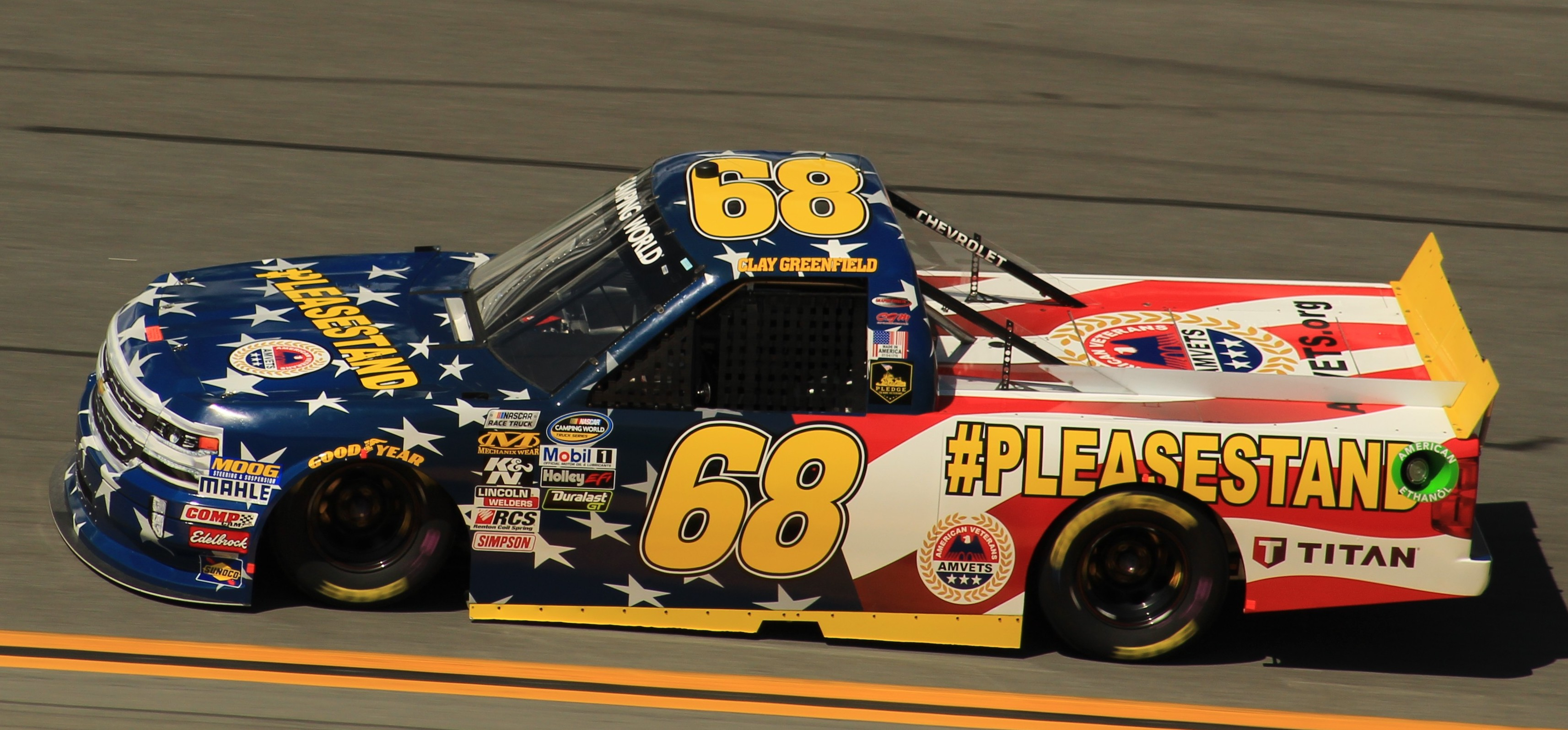
Clay Greenfield racing at Daytona in 2018

The team debuted as Alger Motorsports, running a part-time schedule in the 2011 NASCAR Camping World Truck Series season. After failing to qualify at Daytona, the team debuted in the spring race at Texas. Wayne Edwards drove the team's No. 68 truck at Chicago but failed to qualify.

In 2012, the team fielded the No. 68 for Clay Greenfield.

In 2013, the team was renamed to Clay Greenfield Motorsports. The team started out strong by earning the fastest time at the Daytona International Raceway during practice. Greenfield's 2013 season was most memorable in the last chance qualifier at the Eldora Speedway when he put up a hard fight against Norm Benning to qualify for the race. The season concluded with six starts with a best finish of thirteenth. The next few seasons were based on a part-time effort whenever funding was available as starts have mainly been attempted at superspeedways.

The team also fielded a part-time ARCA Racing Series team, the No. 70 Chevrolet SS, for team co-owner Billy Alger in 2015 and 2016. Sometime after this, Alger would leave the team, making Greenfield its sole owner.

Greenfield's team intended on running eight races in 2020. However, the team ended up running nearly the full season, which was due to the fact that after the two month break in the season due to the COVID-19 pandemic, the field size for the series was expanded from 32 to 40 trucks due to the absence of qualifying. Also that year, CGM hired NASCAR on Fox studio commentator Jeff Hammond to come out of retirement and crew chief the truck in its part-time schedule of races. Bobby Reuse was also scheduled to drive the No. 68 at the Daytona RC in a partnership with Jordan Anderson Racing, but failed to do so due to the chassis not properly admitted.

For 2021, Greenfield announced that his team would run the full season in the Truck Series for the first time. However, Greenfield himself would only run three races while the team seeks funded drivers who bring sponsorship to run the remaining nineteen after the team's primary sponsor, Rackley Roofing, left the team to partner with Willie Allen to form a new team, Rackley W.A.R. CGM only ended up attempting four races that year, all with Greenfield driving.

The team did not attempt any races in 2022 and Greenfield drove part-time for Cook Racing Technologies in their No. 84 truck instead with his own team's former crew chief, Tucker Wingo, also moving over to crew chief him at that team.

==== Truck No. 68 results ====
Year	Driver	No.	Make	1	2	3	4	5	6	7	8	9	10	11	12	13	14	15	16	17	18	19	20	21	22	23	24	25	NCTC	Pts
2011	Clay Greenfield	68	Dodge	DAY; DNQ	PHO	DAR	MAR	NSH	DOV	CLT	KAN	TEX; 27	KEN; DNQ	IOW	NSH	IRP	POC	MCH	BRI	ATL			KEN; 30	LVS	TAL; DNQ	MAR	TEX; 22	HOM; 30	53rd	36
2011	Wayne Edwards	68	Dodge																		CHI; DNQ	NHA							53rd	36
2012	Clay Greenfield	68	Ram	DAY; 10	MAR; 31	CAR; DNQ	KAN	CLT; 36	DOV	TEX	KEN; 18	IOW	CHI; 28	POC	MCH	BRI; DNQ	BRI	ATL	IOW	KEN	TAL; 16	MAR; 25	TEX	PHO	HOM				39th	144
2013	Clay Greenfield	68	Ram	DAY; 26	MAR; DNQ	CAR; DNQ	KAN; 16	CLT	DOV	TEX	KEN	IOW	ELD; DNQ	POC	MCH	BRI; 34	MSP	IOW	CHI	LVS	TAL; 13	MAR; 27	TEX	PHO	HOM				40th	87
2014	Clay Greenfield	68	Ram	DAY	MAR; 30	KAN	CLT	DOV	TEX	GTW	KEN	IOW	ELD	POC	MCH	BRI	MSP	CHI	NHA	LVS									52nd	37
2014	Clay Greenfield	68	Chevy																		TAL; 21	MAR	TEX	PHO	HOM				52nd	37
2015	Clay Greenfield	68	Chevy	DAY; DNQ	ATL	MAR	KAN	CLT	DOV	TEX	GTW	IOW	KEN	ELD	POC	MCH	BRI	MSP	CHI			TAL; 30	MAR	TEX	PHO	HOM			46th	39
2015	Clay Greenfield	68	Ram																	NHA; 19	LVS								46th	39
2016	Clay Greenfield	68	Chevy	DAY; DNQ	ATL	MAR	KAN	DOV	CLT	TEX	IOW	GTW	KEN	ELD	POC	BRI	MCH	MSP	CHI	NHA	LVS	TAL	MAR	TEX	PHO	HOM			53rd	0
2017	Clay Greenfield	68	Chevy	DAY; 29	ATL	MAR	KAN	CLT	DOV	TEX	GTW; 24	IOW	KEN	ELD	POC	MCH	BRI; 26	MSP	CHI	NHA	LVS	TAL; 8	MAR	TEX	PHO	HOM			40th	61
2018	Clay Greenfield	68	Chevy	DAY; 22	ATL	LVS	MAR	DOV	KAN	CLT; Wth	TEX; 20	IOW	GTW	CHI	KEN; 21	ELD	POC	MCH	BRI; 20	MSP	LVS	TAL; 32	MAR	TEX	PHO	HOM			40th	77
2019	Clay Greenfield	68	Chevy	DAY; 12	ATL	LVS	MAR	TEX	DOV	KAN	CLT	TEX	IOW	GTW	CHI														40th	73
2019	Clay Greenfield	68	Toyota													KEN; 16	POC	ELD	MCH	BRI; 26	MSP	LVS	TAL; 25	MAR	PHO	HOM			40th	73
2020	Clay Greenfield	68	Toyota	DAY; DNQ	LVS	CLT; 29	ATL; 26	HOM; 30	POC; 31	KEN; 26	TEX; 20	KAN; 28	KAN; 31	MCH; 20		DOV; 32	GTW; 19	DAR; 21	RCH; 21	BRI; 22	LVS; 22	TAL; 14	KAN; 25	TEX; 35	MAR; 21	PHO			29th	233
2020	Bobby Reuse	68	Toyota												DRC; Wth														29th	233
2021	Clay Greenfield	68	Toyota	DAY; DNQ	DRC	LVS	ATL	BRD	RCH	KAN	DAR	COA	CLT	TEX	NSH; DNQ	POC	KNX	GLN	GTW; DNQ	DAR; 19	BRI	LVS	TAL	MAR	PHO				44th	18

=== Truck No. 86 history ===
In 2012, the team fielded the No. 86 for Scott Riggs and Blake Koch in a start and park effort.

==== Truck No. 86 results ====
Year	Driver	No.	Make	1	2	3	4	5	6	7	8	9	10	11	12	13	14	15	16	17	18	19	20	21	22	NCWTC	Pts
2012	Scott Riggs	86	Ram	DAY	MAR	CAR	KAN	CLT	DOV	TEX	KEN; 36	IOW														54th	30
2012	Blake Koch	86	Ram										CHI; 32	POC	MCH	BRI; QL^{†}										54th	30
2012	Clay Greenfield	86	Ram													BRI; 34	ATL	IOW	KEN	LVS	TAL	MAR	TEX	PHO	HOM	54th	30

=== Truck No. 95 history ===
In 2023, Greenfield re-started his own team with new co-owners Jordan and Theresa Kiss, who own Backyard Blues Pools, one of the team's sponsors and also one of Greenfield's sponsors when he drove the No. 84 truck for Cook Racing Enterprises. As a result, the team was renamed GK Racing, which stands for each of their last initials.

==== Truck No. 95 results ====
Year	Driver	No.	Make	1	2	3	4	5	6	7	8	9	10	11	12	13	14	15	16	17	18	19	20	21	22	23	24	25	NCTC	Pts
2023	Clay Greenfield	95	Toyota	DAY	LVS	ATL	COA	TEX	BRD	MAR	KAN	DAR	NWS	CLT	GTW; 35	NSH	MOH	POC	RCH	IRP	MLW	KAN	BRI						50th	2
2023	Clay Greenfield	95	Chevy																					TAL; DNQ	HOM	PHO			50th	2
2024	Clay Greenfield	95	Chevy	DAY; DNQ	ATL	LVS	BRI	COA	MAR	TEX	KAN	DAR	NWS	CLT	GTW	NSH	POC	IRP	RCH	MLW	BRI	KAN	TAL; 15	HOM	MAR	PHO			42nd	22
2025	Clay Greenfield	95	Chevy	DAY; 33	ATL	LVS	HOM	MAR	BRI	CAR	TEX	KAN	NWS	CLT	NSH	MCH	POC	LRP	IRP	GLN	RCH	DAR	BRI; DNQ	NHA	ROV	TAL	MAR	PHO	49th	4
2026	Clay Greenfield	95	Chevy	DAY; 18	ATL	STP	DAR	CAR	BRI	TEX	GLN	DOV	CLT	NSH	MCH	COR	LRP	NWS	IRP	RCH	NHA	BRI	KAN	CLT	PHO	TAL; 15	MAR	HOM	41st	41

== ARCA Racing Series ==
=== Car No. 70 history ===
The team also fielded a part-time ARCA Racing Series team, the No. 70 Chevrolet SS, for team co-owner Billy Alger in 2015 and 2016. Sometime after this, Alger would leave the team, making Greenfield its sole owner.

==== Car No. 70 results ====
Year	Driver	No.	Make	1	2	3	4	5	6	7	8	9	10	11	12	13	14	15	16	17	18	19	20	Owners	Pts
2015	Billy Alger	70	Chevy	DAY	MOB	NSH	SLM	TAL	TOL	NJE; Wth	POC	MCH	CHI	WIN; Wth	IOW	IRP	POC	BLN; Wth	ISF	DSF; 31	SLM	KEN	KAN	NA	-
2016	Billy Alger	70	Chevy	DAY	NSH; Wth	SLM; 31	TAL	TOL	NJE	POC	MCH	MAD	WIN	IOW	IRP; 32	POC	BLN; 24	ISF	DSF	SLM	CHI	KEN	KAN		
