= Josh Reaume =

American racing driver (born 1990)

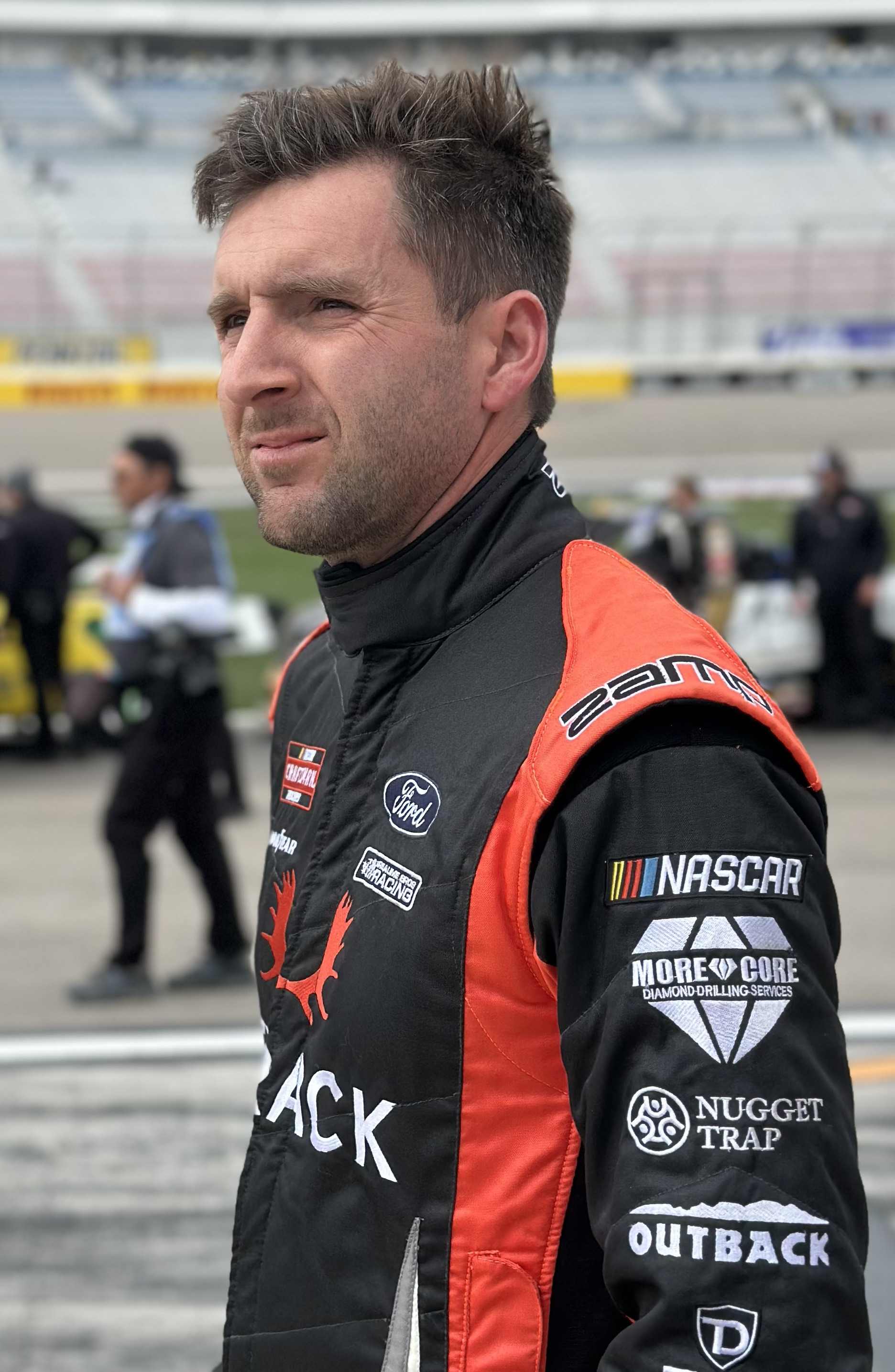
- Reaume at Las Vegas Motor Speedway in 2025
- Born: Joshua Robert Reaume; October 11, 1990 (age 36); Redlands, California, U.S.

NASCAR O'Reilly Auto Parts Series career
- 35 races run over 5 years
- 2020 position: 86th
- Best finish: 33rd (2015)
- First race: 2014 ToyotaCare 250 (Richmond)
- Last race: 2020 Draft Top 250 (Martinsville)
| Wins | Top tens | Poles |
|---|---|---|
| 0 | 0 | 0 |

NASCAR FedEx Freight Truck Series career
- 95 races run over 13 years
- 2026 position: 34th
- Best finish: 23rd (2019)
- First race: 2013 American Ethanol 200 (Iowa)
- Last race: 2026 Black's Tire 200 (Martinsville)
| Wins | Top tens | Poles |
|---|---|---|
| 0 | 1 | 0 |

ARCA Menards Series career
- 1 race run over 1 year
- Best finish: 102nd (2023)
- First race: 2023 Dawn 150 (Kansas)
| Wins | Top tens | Poles |
|---|---|---|
| 0 | 0 | 0 |

ARCA Menards Series East career
- 1 race run over 1 year
- Best finish: 69th (2015)
- First race: 2013 Blue Ox 100 (Richmond)
| Wins | Top tens | Poles |
|---|---|---|
| 0 | 0 | 0 |

ARCA Menards Series West career
- 4 races run over 2 years
- Best finish: 24th (2012)
- First race: 2012 Utah Grand Prix (Tooele)
- Last race: 2013 NAPA Auto Parts 150 Presented by Toyota (Evergreen)
| Wins | Top tens | Poles |
|---|---|---|
| 0 | 0 | 0 |
- Statistics up to date as of November 6, 2026.

Joshua Robert Reaume (born October 11, 1990) is an American professional stock car racing driver, engineer, and team owner. He is best known as the team owner and part-time driver for Team Reaume, driving various trucks for the team alongside working various managerial and technical jobs for the organization.

Born in Redlands, California, Reaume shortly after moved to Nigeria at the age of two as part of his parent's missionary work. He began his racing career at the age of six, racing go-karts in the province of Ontario. After moving to Vancouver Island in Canada at 15 years old, he began racing late models at Western Speedway. After making select regional NASCAR series races in 2012 and 2013, Reaume made his first NASCAR national touring series start in 2013, working in the next five years as an engineer and part-time driver for various teams. In 2018, Reaume expanded his family's racing team, Reaume Brothers Racing (now named Team Reaume), to the third-tier NASCAR Truck Series. In the following years, Reaume entered various partnerships. He took managerial and technical roles on second-tier NASCAR O'Reilly Auto Parts Series and first-tier NASCAR Cup Series teams alongside expanding his Truck Series operations, occasionally driving for his team.

== Early life and family background ==
Joshua Robert Reaume was born on October 11, 1990, in Redlands, California. He is the son of John Reaume and Wendy Reaume, who were both missionaries specializing in humanitarian aid. He was born alongside an older brother named Jonathan. At the age of two, Reaume moved to Nigeria as part of his parents' mission, staying in the country for 13 years. Growing up, Reaume, his father, and his grandfather often watched Formula One and NASCAR, which he credited to his interest to motorsports. After high school, Reaume attended the University of Victoria, earning a degree in mechanical engineering in 2012. As part of his university studies, he interned at various NASCAR teams in numerous engineering roles.

== Motorsports career ==
=== Early racing years ===
Reaume began racing go-karts at the age of six in the Canadian province of Ontario after his mother became ill, racing primarily in Europe in the following years. At 15 years old, Reaume moved to Vancouver Island. After moving to Canada, he began racing at Western Speedway, where he won rookie of the year honors in the track's stock car class in 2007. In 2009, Reaume was selected as one of 20 drivers for the Winner's Circle driver development program created by Ron Sutton. The following year, Reaume began more heavily pursuing a professional racing career, racing in local NASCAR late model events in 2010.

=== Early NASCAR years (2012–2017) ===
Although Reaume initially wanted to pursue a career in open-wheel racing and had aspirations to compete in Formula One, he was limited by a lack of funding. Reaume eventually decided to pursue a career in stock car racing due to his belief that it was easier to obtain corporate sponsors in stock car racing. He was able to make his first start in a regional NASCAR series race in 2012 at the Miller Motorsports Park, finishing in 25th in a K&N Pro Series West (now known as the ARCA Menards Series West) for Gregory Rayl. Reaume made additional starts in the series, earning a best finish of 15th at Evergreen. At the 12th race of the season at Portland, Reaume suffered carbon monoxide poisoning after sustaining damage to the car's exhaust in a crash.

In 2013, Reaume made his debut in the third-tier NASCAR Truck Series for SS-Green Light Racing, finishing 25th in the ninth race of the season at Iowa. The following year, Reaume drove a part-time schedule in the second-tier NASCAR Nationwide Series (now known as the NASCAR O'Reilly Auto Parts Series) for Rick Ware Racing (RWR), signing a six-race deal. He was scheduled to make his debut at the fourth race of the season at Bristol in mid-March; however, it was pushed back until late April due to numerous engine failures for RWR prior to Reaume's scheduled debut. In his debut at the eighth race of the season in Richmond, he finished in 30th out of 40 cars; in an interview with the Times Colonist, he described his debut as both "a lot of fun" and "a big learning curve", stating that "we met all our goals". In his next Nationwide Series start at Dover, he finished a season-best 25th. In the rest of his Nationwide Series races for the season, he failed to finish all but one race due to various mechanical issues and a crash at the 20th race of the season at Iowa.

Reaume started the 2015 season in the renamed Xfinity Series with Obaika Racing, earning a career-best 23rd at the season-opening race at Daytona. Although he was initially signed for a full-time ride, he only attempted the opening three rounds of the season with the team before he was replaced by Peyton Sellers, not returning until the 13th race of the season at Michigan driving for Carl Long's MBM Motorsports. Racing with MBM Motorsports for a majority of the rest of the season, he earned a best finish of 28th with the team. Starting in 2016, Reaume took a job as an engineer for Xfinity Series team RSS Racing, a job that he would maintain for two years. He additionally also worked as an engineer at MBM Motorsports during the season; due to his engineering jobs, he had a mostly-inactive racing season. Midway through the 2017 Truck Series season, Reaume returned to racing with Beaver Motorsports.

=== Owner-driver era (2018–present) ===
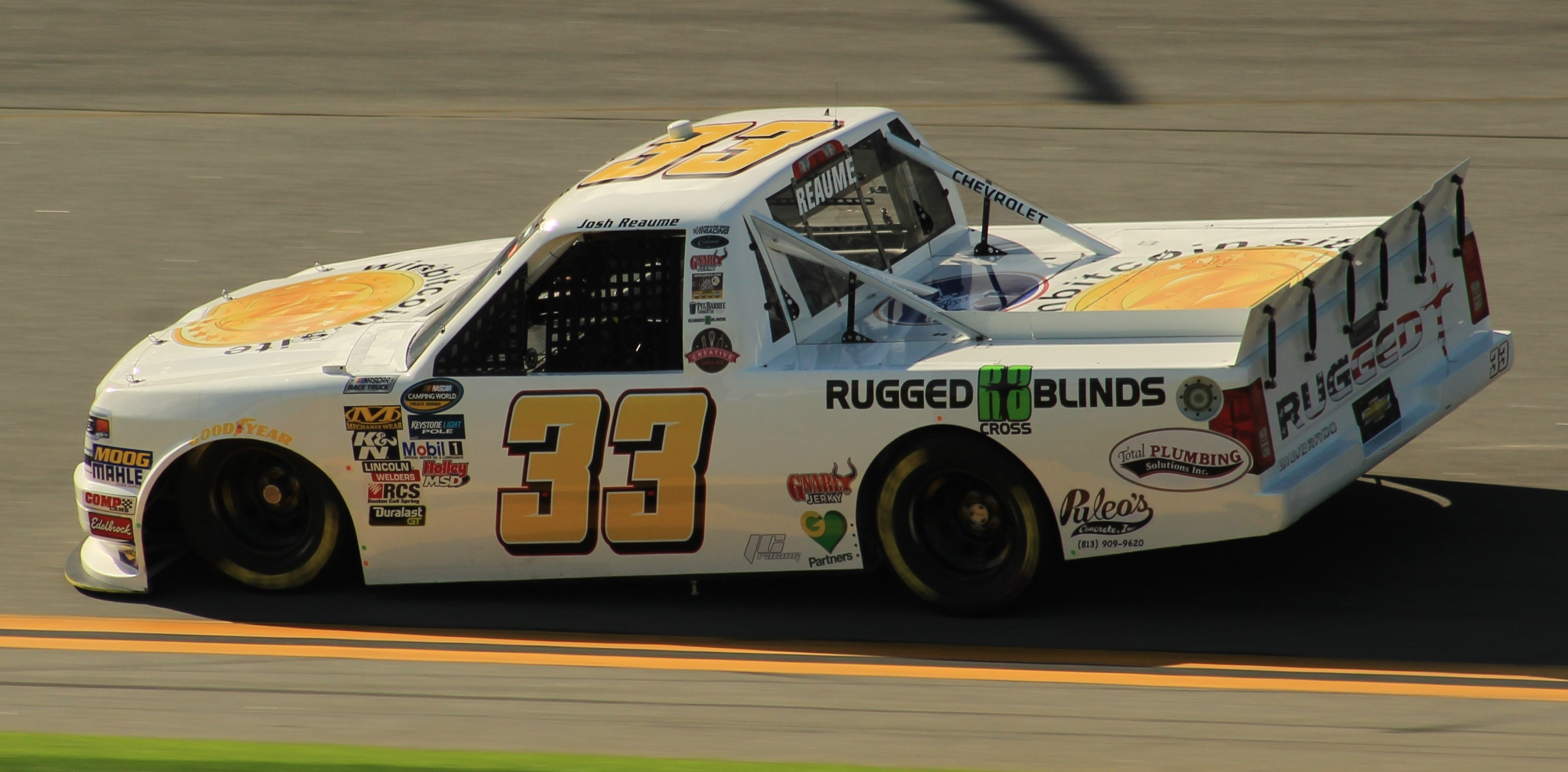
Reaume's truck at the 2018 NextEra Energy Resources 250; the debut attempt for Reaume's NASCAR Truck Series team, Team Reaume.

In February 2018, Reaume announced the expansion of his family-owned race team, then-called Reaume Brothers Racing (RBR; now named Team Reaume), to the NASCAR Truck Series. According to Reaume, he wanted to pursue team ownership because of his previous experience as an engineer and that he felt that ownership could provide more opportunities to potential sponsors he negotiated with and knew. He also stated that he "knew that he couldn't be a driver for forever", wanting to stay within motorsports after he retired. Reaume described the first races for RBR as turbulent. Reaume, driving for RBR, failed to qualify in their debut attempt at the season-opener at Daytona, sustained a crash at the following race at Atlanta, and missed numerous races during the season. He later stated to the Calgary Journal that during the season, "I crashed more my first season driving for myself than I crashed for all the other teams I had raced for combined."

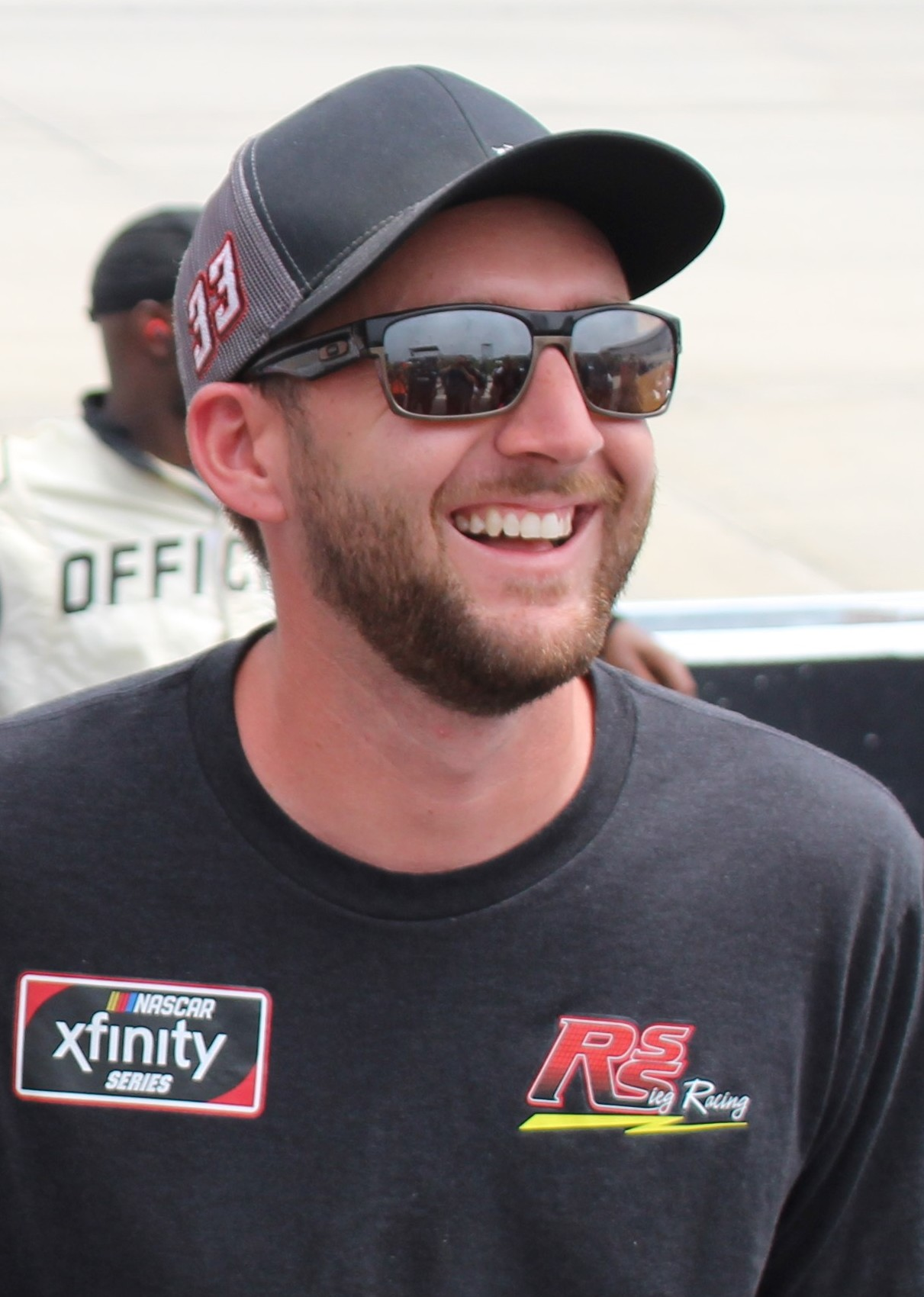
Reaume at Dover Motor Speedway in 2019.

Reaume described his 2019 season as an improvement from the previous year. Reaume began the season with, to date, his only career top-ten in the NASCAR Truck Series at Daytona, finishing sixth for RBR. During the season, Reaume was able to enter a second truck at select races and have a lower crash occurrence than the previous season. During the year, Reaume served as a crew chief for various teams, including MBM Motorsports' No. 42 entry for Chad Finchum and RSS Racing's No. 93 entry for Josh Bilicki. Prior to the COVID-19 pandemic, Reaume planned to expand RBR's operations to include Formula Three and Formula Two; however, the plans never formulated due to the pandemic.

==== Partnerships and expansion of team ====
In 2020, Reaume was able to expand RBR to two full-time entries, signing Angela Ruch to run the team's No. 00 entry. Midway through the 2020 season, Reaume entered into a partnership with NASCAR Xfinity Series (now known as the NASCAR O'Reilly Auto Parts Series) team RSS Racing, with Reaume overseeing day-to-day operations of the team's No. 93 entry. Reaume also announced his intentions to purchase the No. 93 team the following year for his team to expand to the Xfinity Series. In an interview with Frontstretch, Reaume described the experience as "challenging" due to the need of moving the team's equipment from Georgia to RBR's shop in North Carolina and a limited budget. In 2021, after a suspension from NASCAR that was issued in November 2020 was lifted in March, he made his return at a Truck Series race at Richmond for the season's sixth round in April. Reaume continued his partnership with RSS Racing at the beginning of the 2021 Xfinity Series season; however, the team was bought by Our Motorsports three races into the Xfinity Series season.

Soon after the purchase, Reaume entered into a partnership with MBM Motorsports to run two Xfinity Series races with Dutch driver Loris Hezemans. In 2022, Reaume entered into a partnership with Loris' father, Toine, and Dutch businessman Ernst Berg to field a part-time NASCAR Cup Series team named Team Hezeberg. In an interview with CHEK-DT, Reaume described the formation of the team as a "bit of a pipe dream", with Hezemans stating that the new Next Gen car debuting in the Cup Series that season had been a deciding factor for both him and Berg to enter the partnership. The team was able to qualify in their debut at the 2022 Daytona 500 with Formula One champion Jacques Villeneuve by qualifying within the top two out of all open cars. Despite numerous problems throughout the weekend, including failing pre-qualifying inspection two times and an engine change before the race, Villeneuve finished in 22nd. During 2022, at the 20th Truck Series round at Bristol, Reaume sustained a concussion during a crash on the 37th lap. After spinning and becoming stationary, his truck was hit by the spinning truck of Rajah Caruth in the driver's side.

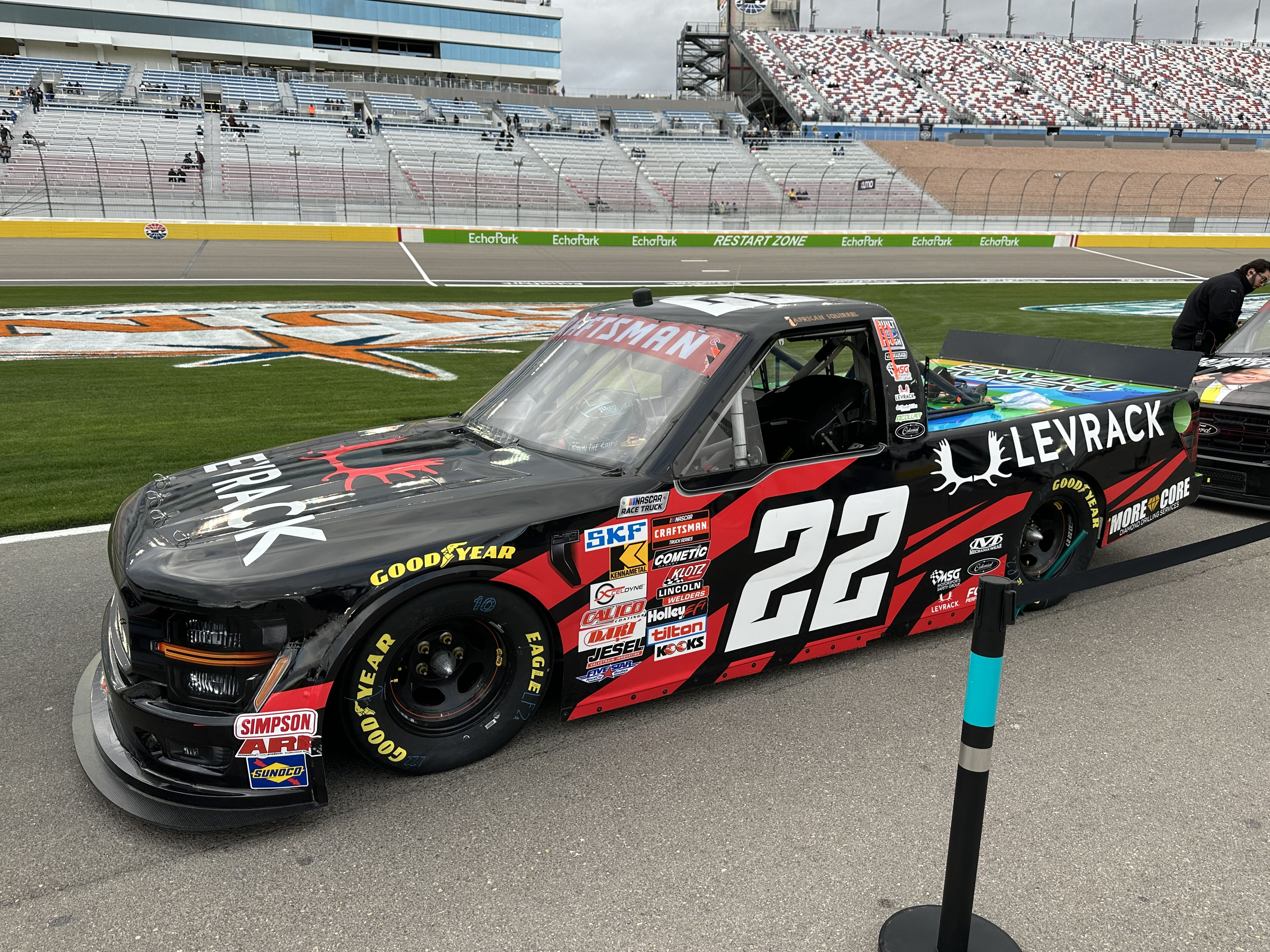
Reaume's truck at the 2025 Ecosave 200.

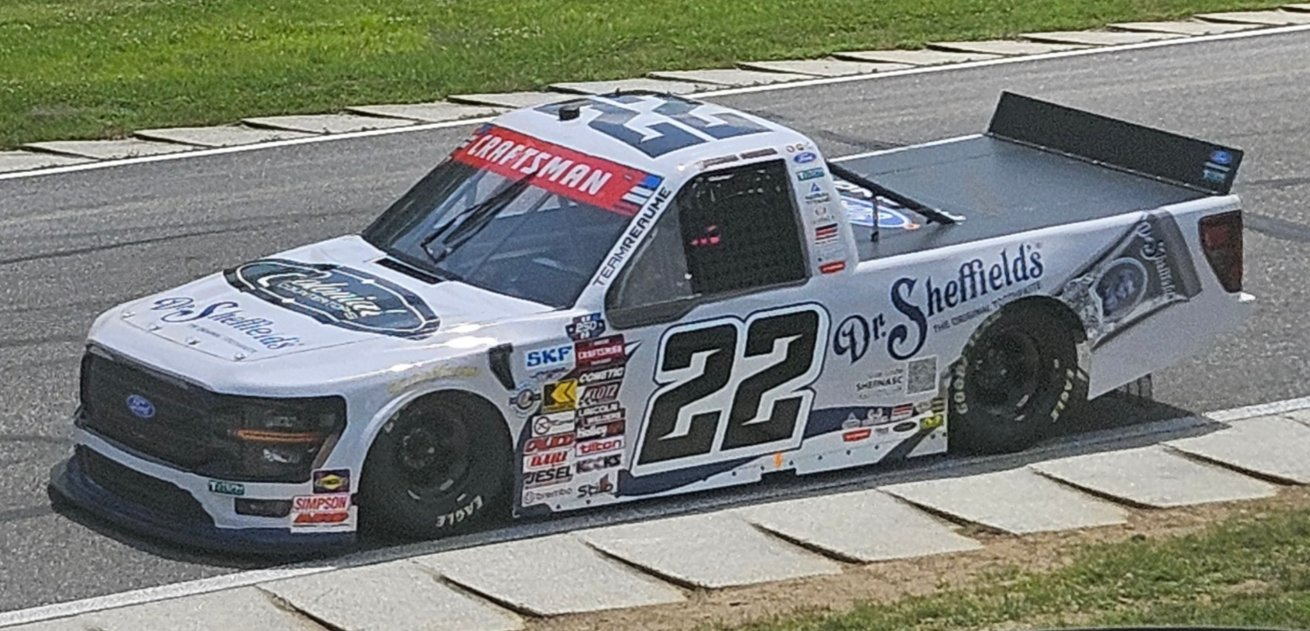
Reaume's No. 22 truck at Lime Rock Park in 2026.

Before the start of the 2023 season, Reaume's shop building that stored numerous trucks for RBR caught on fire on January 26, causing injuries to three employees and major damage to the shop and trucks. After the fire, Reaume's team received assistance from NASCAR Truck Series teams GMS Racing and Hattori Racing Enterprises for RBR to be able to compete at the season-opening race at Daytona. Reaume split racing duties between his own team and AM Racing during the season, earning a season-best race finish of 19th at Daytona. For the 2024 season, Reaume expanded his team's operations to two full-time trucks, purchasing owner points from HRE's No. 16 entry, AM Racing's No. 22 entry, and On Point Motorsports' No. 30 entry. The following season, Reaume expanded to three full-time trucks, buying the owner points of Young's Motorsports' No. 02 entry.

== Personal life ==
=== Alleged anti-Semitic social media post, subsequent suspension ===
On November 10, 2020, Reaume was indefinitely suspended by NASCAR for discriminatory "public statements"; it was later reported that Reaume had posted a picture of a toaster strudel with decorative icing that reportedly was in the shape of a swastika on Snapchat. Soon after the suspension, Reaume denied intentionally drawing the swastika to the Times Colonist, stating that at the time of posting, he thought it was a "thoughtless, meaningless post. There was no intent or symbolism meant... But I own it and I apologize to anyone who found it offensive." In another interview with motorsports journalist Toby Christie, Christie stated that Reaume "truly [felt] that the alleged swastika was nothing more than a misunderstanding". After completing sensitivity training, Reaume was reinstated to NASCAR on March 31, 2021.

== Motorsports career results ==
=== Stock car career summary ===
| Season | Series | Team | Races | Wins | Top 5 | Top 10 | Points | Position |
|---|---|---|---|---|---|---|---|---|
| 2012 | NASCAR K&N Pro Series West | GSR Racing | 2 | 0 | 0 | 0 | 115 | 24th |
| 2012 | NASCAR K&N Pro Series West | Midgley Racing | 1 | 0 | 0 | 0 | 115 | 24th |
| 2013 | NASCAR K&N Pro Series West | Bob Wood | 1 | 0 | 0 | 0 | 30 | 60th |
| 2013 | NASCAR K&N Pro Series East | MacDonald Motorsports | 1 | 0 | 0 | 0 | 21 | 69th |
| 2013 | NASCAR Camping World Truck Series | SS-Green Light Racing | 1 | 0 | 0 | 0 | 19 | 68th |
| 2014 | NASCAR Nationwide Series | Rick Ware Racing | 9 | 0 | 0 | 0 | 116 | 36th |
| 2014 | NASCAR Nationwide Series | JGL Racing | 1 | 0 | 0 | 0 | 116 | 36th |
| 2014 | NASCAR Nationwide Series | The Motorsports Group | 1 | 0 | 0 | 0 | 116 | 36th |
| 2015 | NASCAR Camping World Truck Series | Trophy Girl Racing | 1 | 0 | 0 | 0 | 0 | NC† |
| 2015 | NASCAR Xfinity Series | Obaika Racing | 2 | 0 | 0 | 0 | 147 | 33rd |
| 2015 | NASCAR Xfinity Series | MBM Motorsports | 12 | 0 | 0 | 0 | 147 | 33rd |
| 2015 | NASCAR Xfinity Series | JD Motorsports | 1 | 0 | 0 | 0 | 147 | 33rd |
| 2016 | NASCAR Xfinity Series | MBM Motorsports | 1 | 0 | 0 | 0 | 37 | 52nd |
| 2016 | NASCAR Xfinity Series | RSS Racing | 3 | 0 | 0 | 0 | 37 | 52nd |
| 2016 | NASCAR Xfinity Series | B. J. McLeod Motorsports | 1 | 0 | 0 | 0 | 37 | 52nd |
| 2016 | NASCAR Xfinity Series | Rick Ware Racing | 1 | 0 | 0 | 0 | 37 | 52nd |
| 2017 | NASCAR Camping World Truck Series | Beaver Motorsports | 13 | 0 | 0 | 0 | 223 | 24th |
| 2018 | NASCAR Camping World Truck Series | Reaume Brothers Racing | 12 | 0 | 0 | 0 | 171 | 26th |
| 2018 | NASCAR Xfinity Series | Jimmy Means Racing | 1 | 0 | 0 | 0 | 0 | NC† |
| 2019 | NASCAR Gander Outdoors Truck Series | Reaume Brothers Racing | 13 | 0 | 0 | 1 | 179 | 23rd |
| 2020 | NASCAR Gander RV & Outdoors Truck Series | Reaume Brothers Racing | 12 | 0 | 0 | 0 | 115 | 39th |
| 2020 | NASCAR Xfinity Series | Mike Harmon Racing | 1 | 0 | 0 | 0 | 0 | NC† |
| 2020 | NASCAR Xfinity Series | RSS Racing | 1 | 0 | 0 | 0 | 0 | NC† |
| 2021 | NASCAR Camping World Truck Series | Reaume Brothers Racing | 6 | 0 | 0 | 0 | 35 | 55th |
| 2022 | NASCAR Camping World Truck Series | Reaume Brothers Racing | 6 | 0 | 0 | 0 | 31 | 49th |
| 2023 | ARCA Menards Series | Fast Track Racing | 1 | 0 | 0 | 0 | 26 | 102nd |
| 2023 | NASCAR Craftsman Truck Series | AM Racing | 5 | 0 | 0 | 0 | 101 | 36th |
| 2023 | NASCAR Craftsman Truck Series | Reaume Brothers Racing | 5 | 0 | 0 | 0 | 101 | 36th |
| 2024 | NASCAR Craftsman Truck Series | Reaume Brothers Racing | 1 | 0 | 0 | 0 | 4 | 72nd |
| 2025 | NASCAR Craftsman Truck Series | Reaume Brothers Racing | 8 | 0 | 0 | 0 | 104 | 32nd |
| 2026 | NASCAR Craftsman Truck Series | Team Reaume | 11 | 0 | 0 | 0 | 113 | 34th |

^{†} As Reaume was a guest driver, he was ineligible for championship points.

=== NASCAR ===
(key) (Bold – Pole position awarded by qualifying time. Italics – Pole position earned by points standings or practice time. * – Most laps led.)

==== Xfinity Series ====
NASCAR Xfinity Series results
| Year | Team | No. | Make | 1 | 2 | 3 | 4 | 5 | 6 | 7 | 8 | 9 | 10 | 11 | 12 | 13 | 14 | 15 | 16 | 17 | 18 | 19 | 20 | 21 | 22 | 23 | 24 | 25 | 26 | 27 | 28 | 29 | 30 | 31 | 32 | 33 | NXSC | Pts | Ref |
|---|---|---|---|---|---|---|---|---|---|---|---|---|---|---|---|---|---|---|---|---|---|---|---|---|---|---|---|---|---|---|---|---|---|---|---|---|---|---|---|
| 2014 | Rick Ware Racing | 23 | Chevy | DAY | PHO | LVS | BRI | CAL | TEX | DAR | RCH; 30 | TAL | IOW | CLT | | | | KEN; 35 | DAY | | | | | | | | | | | | | | | | | | 36th | 116 | |
| 2014 | JGL Racing | 93 | Dodge | | | | | | | | | | | | DOV; 25 | MCH | ROA | | | | | | | | | | | | | | | | | | | | 36th | 116 | |
| 2014 | Rick Ware Racing | 87 | Chevy | | | | | | | | | | | | | | | | | NHA; 34 | CHI; 33 | IND; 33 | IOW; 33 | GLN | | | | | CHI; 37 | KEN; 37 | DOV; QL^{†} | KAN | CLT | TEX | PHO | HOM | 36th | 116 | |
| 2014 | The Motorsports Group | 46 | Chevy | | | | | | | | | | | | | | | | | | | | | | MOH; 38 | BRI | ATL | | | | | | | | | | 36th | 116 | |
| 2014 | Rick Ware Racing | 87 | Ford | | | | | | | | | | | | | | | | | | | | | | | | | RCH; 33 | | | | | | | | | 36th | 116 | |
| 2015 | Obaika Racing | 97 | Chevy | DAY; 23 | ATL; 38 | LVS; DNQ | PHO | CAL | TEX | BRI | RCH | TAL | IOW | CLT | DOV | | | | | | | | | | | | | | | | | | | | | | 33rd | 147 | |
| 2015 | MBM Motorsports | 13 | Chevy | | | | | | | | | | | | | MCH; 29 | | | | | | | | | | | | | CHI; 30 | KEN | | | | | | | 33rd | 147 | |
| 2015 | MBM Motorsports | 13 | Toyota | | | | | | | | | | | | | | CHI; 33 | DAY | | | | | | | | | | RCH; 28 | | | | | | | | | 33rd | 147 | |
| 2015 | MBM Motorsports | 40 | Dodge | | | | | | | | | | | | | | | | KEN; 37 | NHA; 38 | IND; 39 | IOW; 39 | GLN | MOH; 39 | BRI | ROA | DAR | | | | | | | TEX; 37 | PHO | | 33rd | 147 | |
| 2015 | MBM Motorsports | 13 | Dodge | | | | | | | | | | | | | | | | | | | | | | | | | | | | DOV; 34 | | | | | | 33rd | 147 | |
| 2015 | JD Motorsports | 0 | Chevy | | | | | | | | | | | | | | | | | | | | | | | | | | | | | CLT; 38 | KAN | | | | 33rd | 147 | |
| 2015 | MBM Motorsports | 40 | Chevy | | | | | | | | | | | | | | | | | | | | | | | | | | | | | | | | | HOM; 31 | 33rd | 147 | |
| 2016 | MBM Motorsports | 13 | Dodge | DAY | ATL; 34 | | | | | | | | | | | | | | | | | | | | | | | | | | | | | | | | 52nd | 37 | |
| 2016 | RSS Racing | 93 | Chevy | | | LVS; 38 | | | | | | TAL; DNQ | DOV; 37 | CLT | POC | MCH | IOW; 40 | DAY | KEN | NHA | IND | IOW | GLN | MOH | BRI | ROA | DAR | RCH | CHI | KEN | DOV | CLT | | | | | 52nd | 37 | |
| 2016 | MBM Motorsports | 40 | Toyota | | | | PHO; DNQ | CAL | TEX | BRI | RCH | | | | | | | | | | | | | | | | | | | | | | | | | | 52nd | 37 | |
| 2016 | B. J. McLeod Motorsports | 15 | Ford | | | | | | | | | | | | | | | | | | | | | | | | | | | | | | KAN; 27 | TEX | PHO | | 52nd | 37 | |
| 2016 | Rick Ware Racing | 25 | Chevy | | | | | | | | | | | | | | | | | | | | | | | | | | | | | | | | | HOM; 33 | 52nd | 37 | |
| 2018 | Jimmy Means Racing | 79 | Chevy | DAY | ATL | LVS | PHO | CAL | TEX | BRI | RCH | TAL | DOV | CLT | POC | MCH | IOW | CHI | DAY | KEN; 39 | NHA | IOW | GLN | MOH | BRI | ROA | DAR | IND | LVS | RCH | ROV | DOV | KAN | TEX | PHO | HOM | 109th | 0^{1} | |
| 2020 | Mike Harmon Racing | 47 | Chevy | DAY | LVS | CAL | PHO | DAR | CLT | BRI | ATL | HOM | HOM | TAL | POC | IRC | KEN | KEN | TEX | KAN | ROA | DRC | DOV | DOV | DAY | DAR | RCH | RCH | BRI | LVS | TAL | ROV | KAN; 33 | TEX | | | 86th | 0^{1} | |
| 2020 | RSS Racing | 93 | Chevy | | | | | | | | | | | | | | | | | | | | | | | | | | | | | | | | MAR; 39 | PHO | 86th | 0^{1} | |
^{†} – Qualified but replaced by Mike Harmon

==== Craftsman Truck Series ====
NASCAR Craftsman Truck Series results
| Year | Team | No. | Make | 1 | 2 | 3 | 4 | 5 | 6 | 7 | 8 | 9 | 10 | 11 | 12 | 13 | 14 | 15 | 16 | 17 | 18 | 19 | 20 | 21 | 22 | 23 | 24 | 25 | NCTC | Pts | Ref |
|---|---|---|---|---|---|---|---|---|---|---|---|---|---|---|---|---|---|---|---|---|---|---|---|---|---|---|---|---|---|---|---|
| 2013 | SS-Green Light Racing | 07 | Chevy | DAY | MAR | CAR | KAN | CLT | DOV | TEX | KEN | IOW; 25 | ELD | POC | MCH | BRI | MSP | IOW | CHI | LVS | TAL | MAR | TEX | PHO | HOM | | | | 68th | 19 | |
| 2015 | Trophy Girl Racing | 44 | Ram | DAY | ATL | MAR | KAN | CLT | DOV | TEX | GTW | IOW | KEN | ELD | POC | MCH | BRI | MSP; 30 | CHI | NHA; DNQ | LVS | TAL | MAR | TEX | PHO | HOM | | | 104th | 0^{1} | |
| 2017 | Beaver Motorsports | 50 | Chevy | DAY | ATL | MAR | KAN | CLT | DOV | TEX; 26 | GTW; 19 | IOW; 18 | KEN; 20 | ELD | POC; Wth | MCH; 19 | BRI; 25 | MSP | CHI; 19 | NHA; 17 | LVS; 16 | TAL; 21 | MAR | TEX; 20 | PHO; 16 | HOM; 22 | | | 24th | 223 | |
| 2018 | Reaume Brothers Racing | 33 | Chevy | DAY; DNQ | ATL; 27 | | MAR; 25 | | | | | IOW; DNQ | GTW; 18 | | KEN; 23 | ELD | POC; 19 | MCH; 20 | BRI | MSP | LVS | TAL | MAR | TEX; DNQ | PHO | HOM | | | 26th | 171 | |
| 2018 | Reaume Brothers Racing | 33 | Toyota | | | LVS; 25 | | DOV; 25 | KAN; 21 | CLT; 24 | TEX; 25 | | | CHI; 21 | | | | | | | | | | | | | | | 26th | 171 | |
| 2019 | Reaume Brothers Racing | 33 | Chevy | DAY; 6 | | LVS; 23 | MAR | TEX; 32 | | | CLT; 28 | TEX; 14 | IOW | GTW; 23 | CHI | KEN | POC; 20 | ELD | | | | | | | | | | | 23rd | 179 | |
| 2019 | Reaume Brothers Racing | 33 | Toyota | | ATL; 30 | | | | | KAN; 20 | | | | | | | | | MCH; 18 | BRI | | | | | | | | | 23rd | 179 | |
| 2019 | Reaume Brothers Racing | 34 | Chevy | | | | | | DOV; 31 | | | | | | | | | | | | | | | | | | | | 23rd | 179 | |
| 2019 | Reaume Brothers Racing | 8 | Toyota | | | | | | | | | | | | | | | | | | MSP; 26 | LVS | TAL | | | | | | 23rd | 179 | |
| 2019 | Reaume Brothers Racing | 34 | Toyota | | | | | | | | | | | | | | | | | | | | | MAR; 31 | PHO | HOM; Wth | | | 23rd | 179 | |
| 2020 | Reaume Brothers Racing | 34 | Toyota | DAY; Wth | | | | | | | | | | | | | | | | | | | | | | | | | 39th | 115 | |
| 2020 | Reaume Brothers Racing | 33 | Toyota | | LVS; 27 | CLT | ATL | HOM | | | | | | | | | | | | BRI; 35 | | TAL; 23 | | TEX; 27 | | | | | 39th | 115 | |
| 2020 | Reaume Brothers Racing | 00 | Toyota | | | | | | POC; 23 | KEN | TEX | KAN | KAN | MCH; 17 | | | | DAR; 28 | RCH; 32 | | LVS; 29 | | KAN; 27 | | | | | | 39th | 115 | |
| 2020 | Reaume Brothers Racing | 00 | Chevy | | | | | | | | | | | | DRC; RL^{†} | DOV | GTW | | | | | | | | MAR; 37 | PHO; 33 | | | 39th | 115 | |
| 2021 | Reaume Brothers Racing | 34 | Toyota | DAY | DRC | LVS | ATL | BRD | RCH; 33 | KAN | DAR | COA | CLT | TEX | | | | | | DAR; 25 | BRI; 40 | LVS | TAL | MAR; 34 | PHO | | | | 55th | 35 | |
| 2021 | Reaume Brothers Racing | 33 | Chevy | | | | | | | | | | | | NSH; DNQ | POC; 28 | KNX | | | | | | | | | | | | 55th | 35 | |
| 2021 | Reaume Brothers Racing | 33 | Toyota | | | | | | | | | | | | | | | GLN; 31 | GTW | | | | | | | | | | 55th | 35 | |
| 2022 | Reaume Brothers Racing | 33 | Toyota | DAY | LVS | ATL | COA | MAR | BRD | DAR; 28 | KAN; 30 | TEX | CLT; 31 | GTW | SON | KNX | NSH | MOH | POC; 34 | IRP; 33 | | KAN; RL^{¤} | | | | | | | 49th | 31 | |
| 2022 | Reaume Brothers Racing | 43 | Toyota | | | | | | | | | | | | | | | | | | RCH; QL^{‡} | | BRI; 35 | TAL | HOM | PHO | | | 49th | 31 | |
| 2023 | AM Racing | 22 | Ford | DAY; 19 | | ATL; 23 | COA | TEX; 21 | | | KAN; 24 | | | | GTW; Wth | | | | | | MLW; 33 | KAN | BRI | TAL | HOM | PHO | | | 36th | 101 | |
| 2023 | Reaume Brothers Racing | 34 | Ford | | LVS; 35 | | | | BRD; DNQ | MAR; Wth | | | | | | | | | RCH; 36 | | | | | | | | | | 36th | 101 | |
| 2023 | Reaume Brothers Racing | 33 | Ford | | | | | | | | | DAR; DNQ | NWS; DNQ | CLT; 29 | GTW; 23 | NSH | MOH; DNQ | POC; 26 | | IRP; DNQ | | | | | | | | | 36th | 101 | |
| 2024 | Reaume Brothers Racing | 22 | Ford | DAY | ATL | LVS | BRI | COA | MAR | TEX | KAN | DAR | NWS; 33 | CLT | GTW | NSH | POC | IRP | RCH | MLW | BRI | KAN | TAL | HOM | | | | | 72nd | 4 | |
| 2024 | Reaume Brothers Racing | 27 | Ford | | | | | | | | | | | | | | | | | | | | | | MAR; Wth | PHO | | | 72nd | 4 | |
| 2025 | Reaume Brothers Racing | 2 | Ford | DAY; 18 | | | | | | | | | | | | | | | | | | | | | | TAL; 24 | MAR | PHO | 32nd | 104 | |
| 2025 | Reaume Brothers Racing | 22 | Ford | | ATL; 18 | LVS; 28 | HOM | MAR; RL^{¶} | BRI | ROC | TEX; 18 | KAN | NWS | CLT | NSH | MCH; 25 | POC | LRP | IRP; RL^{¶} | GLN | RCH | DAR | BRI; 28 | NHA | ROV; 33 | | | | 32nd | 104 | |
| 2026 | Team Reaume | 22 | Ford | DAY; 20 | ATL; 24 | STP | DAR; 35 | ROC | BRI | TEX; 22 | GLN | DOV | CLT; 28 | NSH | MCH; 30 | COR | LRP; 27 | NWS | IRP | RCH | NHA | BRI | | | | TAL; 22 | MAR; 26 | HOM | 34th | 113 | |
| 2026 | Team Reaume | 33 | Ford | | | | | | | | | | | | | | | | | | | | KAN; 33 | CLT; 27 | PHO | | | | 34th | 113 | |
^{†} – Relieved Bobby Kennedy · ^{‡} – Qualified but replaced by Mason Maggio · ^{¤} – Relieved Armani Williams · ^{¶} – Relieved A. J. Waller

^{*} Season still in progress
^{1} Ineligible for series points

=== ARCA Menards Series ===
(key) (Bold – Pole position awarded by qualifying time. Italics – Pole position earned by points standings or practice time. * – Most laps led.)

ARCA Menards Series results
| Year | Team | No. | Make | 1 | 2 | 3 | 4 | 5 | 6 | 7 | 8 | 9 | 10 | 11 | 12 | 13 | 14 | 15 | 16 | 17 | 18 | 19 | 20 | AMSC | Pts | Ref |
|---|---|---|---|---|---|---|---|---|---|---|---|---|---|---|---|---|---|---|---|---|---|---|---|---|---|---|
| 2023 | Fast Track Racing | 11 | Toyota | DAY | PHO | TAL | KAN; 18 | CLT | BLN | ELK | MOH | IOW | POC | MCH | IRP | GLN | ISF | MLW | DSF | KAN | BRI | SLM | TOL | 102nd | 26 | |

==== K&N Pro Series East ====
NASCAR K&N Pro Series East results
| Year | Team | No. | Make | 1 | 2 | 3 | 4 | 5 | 6 | 7 | 8 | 9 | 10 | 11 | 12 | 13 | 14 | NKNPSEC | Pts | Ref |
|---|---|---|---|---|---|---|---|---|---|---|---|---|---|---|---|---|---|---|---|---|
| 2013 | MacDonald Motorsports | 49 | Toyota | BRI | GRE | FIF | RCH; 23 | BGS | IOW | LGY | COL | IOW | VIR | GRE | NHA | DOV | RAL | 69th | 21 | |

==== K&N Pro Series West ====
NASCAR K&N Pro Series West results
| Year | Team | No. | Make | 1 | 2 | 3 | 4 | 5 | 6 | 7 | 8 | 9 | 10 | 11 | 12 | 13 | 14 | 15 | NKNPSWC | Pts | Ref |
|---|---|---|---|---|---|---|---|---|---|---|---|---|---|---|---|---|---|---|---|---|---|
| 2012 | GSR Racing | 07 | Ford | PHO | LHC | MMP; 25 | S99 | | | | | | | | | | | | 24th | 115 | |
| 2012 | GSR Racing | 72 | Chevy | | | | | IOW; DNQ | BIR | LVS | SON | | | | | | | | 24th | 115 | |
| 2012 | GSR Racing | 07 | Chevy | | | | | | | | | EVG; 15 | CNS | IOW | | | | PHO; DNQ | 24th | 115 | |
| 2012 | Midgley Racing | 09 | Chevy | | | | | | | | | | | | PIR; 18 | SMP | AAS | | 24th | 115 | |
| 2013 | Bob Wood | 14 | Toyota | PHO | S99 | BIR | IOW | L44 | SON | CNS | IOW | EVG; 14 | SPO | MMP | SMP | AAS | KCR | PHO | 60th | 30 | |
