= Gregory Rayl =

American racing driver and crew chief (born 1963)

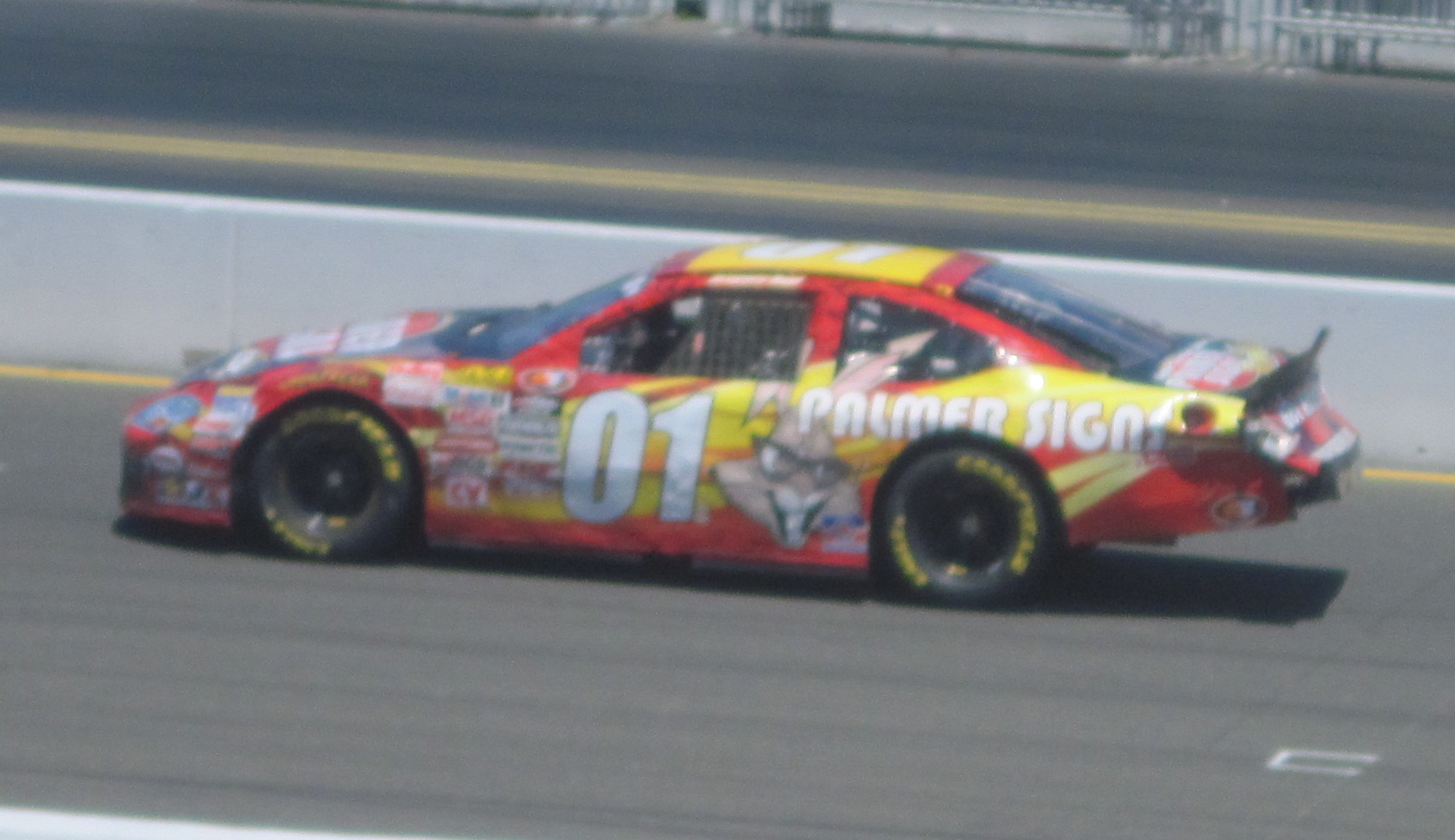
- Rayl competing in the 2011 Thunder Valley Casino Resort 200 at Sonoma Raceway.
- Born: Gregory S. Rayl; November 20, 1963 (age 62) Salida, California, U.S.

NASCAR K&N Pro Series West career
- Debut season: 2008
- Former teams: Spectator Racing, GSR Racing
- Starts: 32
- Wins: 0
- Poles: 0
- Best finish: 11th in 2011
- Finished last season: 53rd (2014)

Previous series
- 1993 2011: NASCAR Southwest Series; NASCAR K&N Pro Series East

NASCAR FedEx Freight Truck Series career
- 2 races run over 1 year
- 2019 position: 81st
- Best finish: 81st (2019)
- First race: 2019 CarShield 200 (Gateway)
- Last race: 2019 Chevrolet Silverado 250 (Mosport)
Wins	Top tens	Poles
0	0	0
- Statistics up to date as of March 25, 2023.

Gregory S. Rayl (pronounced "rail", born November 20, 1963) is an American professional stock car racing driver and crew chief who last worked part time for Reaume Brothers Racing as a crew chief of their No. 2 and No. 22 Ford F-150 entries in the NASCAR Craftsman Truck Series. He has also previously competed in the Truck Series as well as what is now the ARCA Menards Series West as a driver. Most of his 32 career starts in the West Series came as an owner-driver for GSR Racing.

== Racing career ==
A native of Salida, California, Rayl's first NASCAR action came in 1993 with the NASCAR Featherlite Southwest Tour at Stockton 99 Speedway; he finished 16th after crashing on lap 49. In 2008, he began racing part-time in the NASCAR Camping World West Series; two years later, he ran a full schedule in the now-K&N Pro Series West in the No. 07 Ford, finishing 12th in the standings. At season's end, Rayl received the NASCAR Sportsmanship Award. He formed his own team, GSR Racing, in 2011, racing the full schedule and finishing eleventh in points. For the 2012 season, he stepped back to serve as GSR's crew chief for drivers Cassie Gannis and Trevor Cristiani.

In 2019, Rayl joined Reaume Brothers Racing in the NASCAR Gander Outdoors Truck Series as a crew chief for their No. 34 team. In June, he made his Truck debut in the CarShield 200 at World Wide Technology Raceway at Gateway for Jennifer Jo Cobb Racing, but finished last after wrecking on lap two. He made one more start as a driver, this time for the Reaume team, in their No. 32 at the Canadian Tire Motorsport Park road course race. It was a start-and-park field filler entry at that race as a result of only 29 trucks showing up instead of the usual 32. For the rest of that year, he crew chiefed one of Reaume's trucks (the No. 32, 33, or 34) in each race.

In 2023, Rayl returned to RBR as the crew chief of their No. 33 truck driven by Mason Massey. On March 21, NASCAR suspended Rayl and two of the truck's pit crew members for three races after the truck lost its ballast during the race at Atlanta.

== Personal life ==
On October 14, 2012, he married Nancy J. Rayl in El Dorado Hills, California.

== Motorsports career results ==
=== NASCAR ===
(key) (Bold – Pole position awarded by qualifying time. Italics – Pole position earned by points standings or practice time. * – Most laps led.)

==== Gander Outdoors Truck Series ====
NASCAR Gander Outdoors Truck Series results
Year	Team	No.	Make	1	2	3	4	5	6	7	8	9	10	11	12	13	14	15	16	17	18	19	20	21	22	23	NGOTC	Pts	Ref
2019	Jennifer Jo Cobb Racing	0	Chevy	DAY	ATL	LVS	MAR	TEX	DOV	KAN	CLT	TEX	IOW	GTW; 32	CHI	KEN	POC	ELD	MCH	BRI							81st	14	
2019	Reaume Brothers Racing	32	Toyota																		MSP; 28	LVS	TAL	MAR	PHO	HOM	81st	14	

==== K&N Pro Series West ====
NASCAR K&N Pro Series West results
Year	Team	No.	Make	1	2	3	4	5	6	7	8	9	10	11	12	13	14	15	NKNPSWC	Pts	Ref
2008	Spectator Racing	07	Chevy	AAS	PHO	CTS	IOW	CNS	SON	IRW	DCS	EVG	MMP	IRW	AMP; DNQ	AAS; 17			46th	182	
2009	Spectator Racing	07	Ford	CTS	AAS	PHO	MAD	IOW	DCS; 17	SON	IRW	PIR; 20	MMP	CNS	IOW	AAS; 17			30th	327	
2010	Spectator Racing	07	Ford	AAS; 18	PHO; 19	IOW; 15	DCS; 16	SON; 26	IRW; 22	PIR; 18	MRP; 15	CNS; 14	MMP; 13	AAS; 17	PHO; 36				12th	1269	
2011	GSR Racing	01	Ford	PHO; 28	AAS; 17	MMP; 10		LVS; 9	SON; 40	IRW; 21	EVG; 12	PIR; 16	CNS; 18	MRP; 15	SPO; 13				11th	1496	
2011	GSR Racing	0	Ford				IOW; DNQ												11th	1496	
2011	GSR Racing	07	Ford													AAS; 13	PHO; 28		11th	1496	
2013	GSR Racing	07	Ford	PHO; 17	S99; DNQ	BIR	IOW	L44	SON	CNS	IOW	EVG	SPO	MMP	SMP	AAS	KCR	PHO	48th	45	
2014	GSR Racing	07	Chevy	PHO; 23															53rd	39	
2014	GSR Racing	07	Ford		IRW; 26	S99	IOW	KCR	SON	SLS	CNS	IOW	EVG	KCR	MMP	AAS	PHO		53rd	39	

^{*} Season still in progress
^{1} Ineligible for series points
