= 2018 NextEra Energy Resources 250 =

Race details
- Race 1 of 23 of the 2018 NASCAR Camping World Truck Series
- Date: February 16
- Official name: NextEra Energy Resources 250
- Location: Daytona Beach, Florida, Daytona International Speedway
- Course: Permanent racing facility
- Course length: 2.5 miles (4.0 km)
- Distance: 100 laps, 250 mi (402.336 km)
- Scheduled distance: 100 laps, 250 mi (402.336 km)
- Average speed: 120.385 miles per hour (193.741 km/h)

Pole position
Driver	David Gilliland	Kyle Busch Motorsports
- Time: 49.017

Most laps led
Driver	Johnny Sauter	GMS Racing
- Laps: 39

Winner
No. 21	Johnny Sauter	GMS Racing

Television in the United States
- Network: Fox Sports 1
- Announcers: Vince Welch, Phil Parsons, Michael Waltrip

Radio in the United States
- Radio: Motor Racing Network

The 2018 NextEra Energy Resources 250 was the first stock car race of the 2018 NASCAR Camping World Truck Series season, and the 19th iteration of the event. The race was held on Friday, February 16, 2018, in Daytona Beach, Florida at Daytona International Speedway, a 2.5 miles (4.0 km) triangle-shaped superspeedway racetrack. The race would take 100 laps to complete. In a wreck filled race, Johnny Sauter driving for GMS Racing would survive and hold off the field to win the race. To fill out the podium, Justin Haley of GMS Racing and Joe Nemechek, driving for his own team NEMCO Motorsports would finish 2nd and 3rd, respectively.

The race was the debut for Bo LeMastus and Jordan Anderson Racing.

== Background ==
=== Background ===
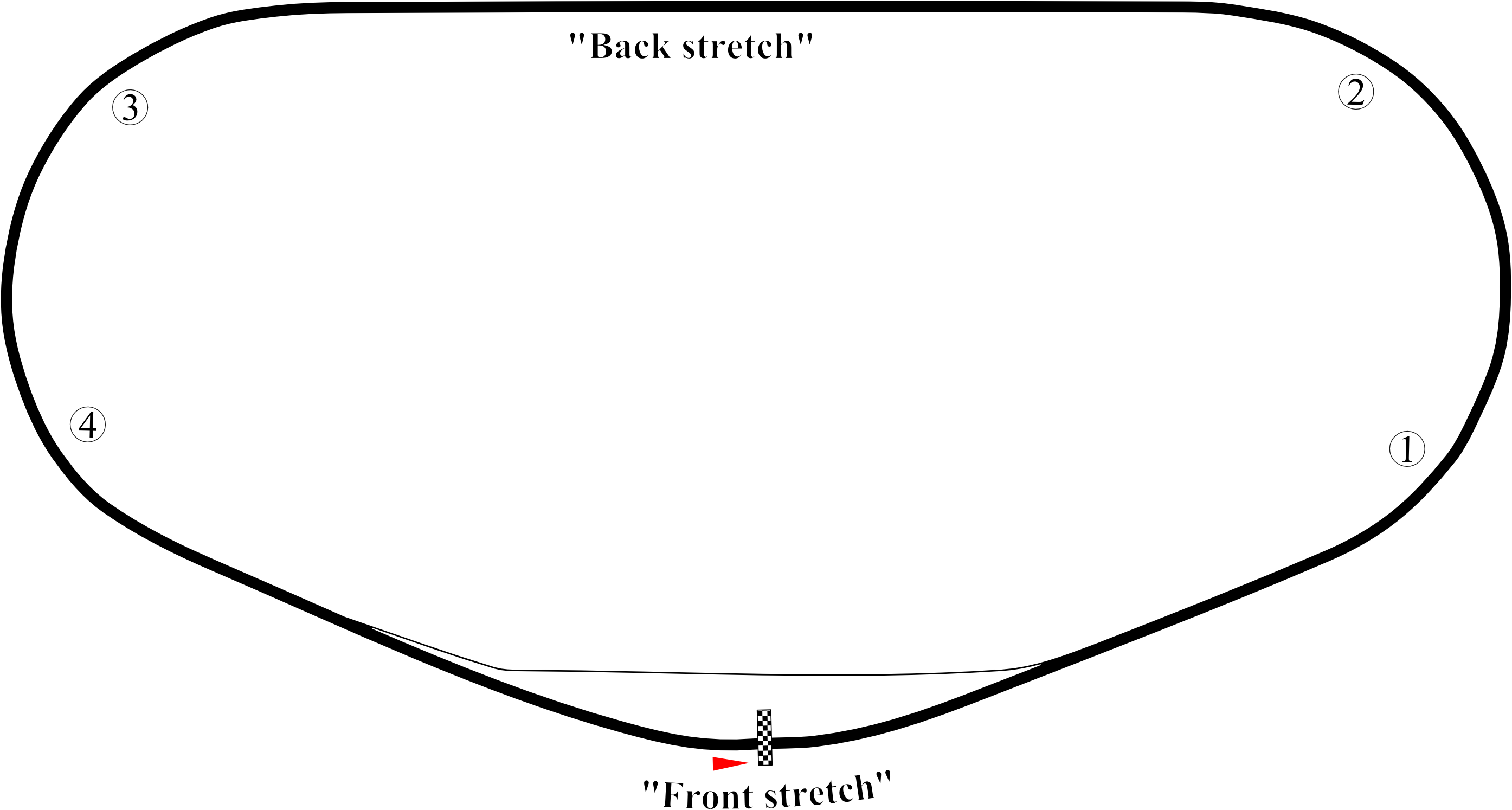
The layout of Daytona International Speedway, the venue where the race was held.

Daytona International Speedway is one of two superspeedways to hold NASCAR races, the other being Talladega Superspeedway. The standard track at Daytona International Speedway is a four-turn superspeedway that is 2.5 miles (4.0 km) long. The track's turns are banked at 31 degrees, while the front stretch, the location of the finish line, is banked at 18 degrees.

=== Entry list ===
#	Driver	Team	Make	Sponsor
1	B. J. McLeod	TJL Motorsports	Chevrolet	Motorsports Safety Group
2	Cody Coughlin	GMS Racing	Chevrolet	Jegs High Performance
02	Austin Hill	Young's Motorsports	Chevrolet	GoShare
3	Jordan Anderson	Jordan Anderson Racing	Toyota	Jacob Companies
4	David Gilliland	Kyle Busch Motorsports	Toyota	Pedigree
6	Norm Benning	Norm Benning Racing	Chevrolet	Zomongo
7	Korbin Forrister	All Out Motorsports	Toyota	All Secure Document Disposal, Tru Clear Global
8	John Hunter Nemechek	NEMCO Motorsports	Chevrolet	Fleetwing
10	Jennifer Jo Cobb	Jennifer Jo Cobb Racing	Chevrolet	Driven2Honor.org, ThinkRealty.com
13	Myatt Snider	ThorSport Racing	Ford	Liberty Tax "You Do Life, We Do Taxes"
15	Robby Lyons	Premium Motorsports	Chevrolet	Troptions
16	Brett Moffitt	Hattori Racing Enterprises	Toyota	Aisin
18	Noah Gragson	Kyle Busch Motorsports	Toyota	Safelite Auto Glass
20	Scott Lagasse Jr.	Young's Motorsports	Chevrolet	Screen Your Machine, American Cancer Society
21	Johnny Sauter	GMS Racing	Chevrolet	Allegiant Air
22	Austin Wayne Self	Niece Motorsports	Chevrolet	AM Technical Solutions, GO TEXAN. "Don't mess with Texas"
24	Justin Haley	GMS Racing	Chevrolet	Fraternal Order of Eagles
25	Dalton Sargeant	GMS Racing	Chevrolet	Performance Plus Motor Oil
28	Bryan Dauzat	FDNY Racing	Chevrolet	New York City Fire Department, American Genomics
33	Josh Reaume	Reaume Brothers Racing	Chevrolet	Rugged Cross Blinds, R-Coin
41	Ben Rhodes	ThorSport Racing	Ford	Alpha Energy Solutions
45	Justin Fontaine	Niece Motorsports	Chevrolet	ProMatic Automation
47	Chris Fontaine	Glenden Enterprises	Chevrolet	Glenden Enterprises
49	Wendell Chavous	Premium Motorsports	Chevrolet	SobrietyNation.org
50	Travis Kvapil	Beaver Motorsports	Chevrolet	Rhino Rush Energy
51	Spencer Davis	Kyle Busch Motorsports	Toyota	SiriusXM, JBL
52	Stewart Friesen	Halmar Friesen Racing	Chevrolet	Halmar "We Build America"
54	Bo LeMastus	DGR-Crosley	Toyota	Crosley Brands
63	Bobby Gerhart	Bobby Gerhart Racing †	Chevrolet	Lucas Oil
68	Clay Greenfield	Clay Greenfield Motorsports	Chevrolet	AMVETS #PLEASESTAND
74	Cody Ware	Mike Harmon Racing	Chevrolet	Mike Harmon Racing
75	Parker Kligerman	Henderson Motorsports	Chevrolet	Food Country USA, Lay's
83	Scott Stenzel	Copp Motorsports	Chevrolet	E2 Northeast Motorsports
87	Joe Nemechek	NEMCO Motorsports	Chevrolet	Fleetwing, D. A. B. Constructors, Inc.
88	Matt Crafton	ThorSport Racing	Ford	Menards, Fisher Nuts
98	Grant Enfinger	ThorSport Racing	Ford	Champion Power Equipment "Powering Your Life."
Official entry list

†In partnership with MB Motorsports.

== Practice ==
=== 1st practice ===
The first practice was held on Thursday, February 15 at 1:00 PM EST. Grant Enfinger of ThorSport Racing would set the fastest time in practice with a 46.867 and an average speed of 192.033 miles per hour (309.047 km/h).

Pos.	#	Driver	Team	Make	Time	Speed
1	98	Grant Enfinger	ThorSport Racing	Ford	46.867	192.033
2	21	Johnny Sauter	GMS Racing	Chevrolet	46.932	191.767
3	88	Matt Crafton	ThorSport Racing	Ford	46.959	191.657
Full 1st practice results

=== 2nd practice ===
The second practice was held on Thursday, February 15 at 3:32 PM EST. Ben Rhodes of ThorSport Racing would set the fastest time in practice with a 46.657 and an average speed of 192.897 miles per hour (310.438 km/h).

Pos.	#	Driver	Team	Make	Time	Speed
1	41	Ben Rhodes	ThorSport Racing	Ford	46.657	192.897
2	24	Justin Haley	GMS Racing	Chevrolet	46.855	192.082
3	21	Johnny Sauter	GMS Racing	Chevrolet	47.025	191.388
Full second practice results

=== 3rd and final practice ===
The third and final practice was held on Thursday, February 15 at 5:28 PM EST. Johnny Sauter of GMS Racing would set the fastest time in practice with a 49.397 and an average speed of 182.197 miles per hour (293.218 km/h).

Pos.	#	Driver	Team	Make	Time	Speed
1	21	Johnny Sauter	GMS Racing	Chevrolet	49.397	182.197
2	68	Clay Greenfield	Clay Greenfield Motorsports	Chevrolet	49.410	182.149
3	88	Matt Crafton	ThorSport Racing	Ford	49.596	181.466
Full final practice results

== Qualifying ==
Qualifying was held on Friday, February 16 at 5:49 PM EST. Qualifying was held in two rounds, both consisting of two lap runs. The first round included every driver, and the second would take the 12 fastest qualifiers from the first round and make them run another two lap run; whoever was fastest won the pole. David Gilliland driving for Kyle Busch Motorsports would run the fastest time in both rounds and win the pole, with a time of 49.017 and an average speed of 183.610 miles per hour (295.492 km/h) in the second round.

Bobby Gerhart, Josh Reaume, Cody Ware, and B. J. McLeod would all fail to qualify.

=== Qualifying results ===
Pos.	#	Driver	Team	Make	Time (R1)	Speed (R1)	Time (R2)	Speed (R2)
1	4	David Gilliland	Kyle Busch Motorsports	Toyota	48.966	183.801	49.017	183.610
2	21	Johnny Sauter	GMS Racing	Chevrolet	49.184	182.986	49.131	183.184
3	68	Clay Greenfield	Clay Greenfield Motorsports	Chevrolet	49.364	182.319	49.212	182.882
4	25	Dalton Sargeant	GMS Racing	Chevrolet	49.238	182.786	49.279	182.634
5	18	Noah Gragson	Kyle Busch Motorsports	Toyota	49.466	181.943	49.303	182.545
6	88	Matt Crafton	ThorSport Racing	Ford	49.480	181.892	49.469	181.932
7	98	Grant Enfinger	ThorSport Racing	Ford	49.627	181.353	49.488	181.862
8	51	Spencer Davis	Kyle Busch Motorsports	Toyota	49.635	181.324	49.594	181.474
9	52	Stewart Friesen	Halmar Friesen Racing	Chevrolet	49.670	181.196	49.608	181.422
10	2	Cody Coughlin	GMS Racing	Chevrolet	49.462	181.958	49.611	181.411
11	02	Austin Hill	Young's Motorsports	Chevrolet	49.652	181.262	49.626	181.357
12	24	Justin Haley	GMS Racing	Chevrolet	49.684	181.145	49.798	180.730
Eliminated in Round 1
13	87	Joe Nemechek	NEMCO Motorsports	Chevrolet	49.732	180.970	—	—
14	8	John Hunter Nemechek	NEMCO Motorsports	Chevrolet	49.811	180.683	—	—
15	22	Austin Wayne Self	Niece Motorsports	Chevrolet	49.901	180.357	—	—
16	54	Bo LeMastus	DGR-Crosley	Toyota	49.934	180.238	—	—
17	45	Justin Fontaine	Niece Motorsports	Chevrolet	50.046	179.835	—	—
18	20	Scott Lagasse Jr.	Young's Motorsports	Chevrolet	50.057	179.795	—	—
19	7	Korbin Forrister	All Out Motorsports	Toyota	50.083	179.702	—	—
20	13	Myatt Snider	ThorSport Racing	Ford	50.109	179.608	—	—
21	47	Chris Fontaine	Glenden Enterprises	Chevrolet	50.214	179.233	—	—
22	16	Brett Moffitt	Hattori Racing Enterprises	Toyota	50.238	179.147	—	—
23	28	Bryan Dauzat	FDNY Racing	Chevrolet	50.273	179.023	—	—
24	41	Ben Rhodes	ThorSport Racing	Ford	50.283	178.987	—	—
25	15	Robby Lyons	Premium Motorsports	Chevrolet	50.507	178.193	—	—
26	75	Parker Kligerman	Henderson Motorsports	Chevrolet	50.919	176.751	—	—
27	10	Jennifer Jo Cobb	Jennifer Jo Cobb Racing	Chevrolet	51.074	176.215	—	—
Qualified by owner's points
28	3	Jordan Anderson	Jordan Anderson Racing	Toyota	51.273	175.531	—	—
29	6	Norm Benning	Norm Benning Racing	Chevrolet	51.728	173.987	—	—
30	49	Wendell Chavous	Premium Motorsports	Chevrolet	52.046	172.924	—	—
31	83	Scott Stenzel	Copp Motorsports	Chevrolet	52.171	172.510	—	—
Champion's Provisional
32	50	Travis Kvapil	Beaver Motorsports	Chevrolet	52.663	170.898	—	—
Failed to qualify
33	63	Bobby Gerhart	Bobby Gerhart Racing	Chevrolet	51.091	176.156	—	—
34	33	Josh Reaume	Reaume Brothers Racing	Chevrolet	51.388	175.138	—	—
35	74	Cody Ware	Mike Harmon Racing	Chevrolet	52.323	172.008	—	—
36	1	B. J. McLeod	TJL Motorsports	Chevrolet	54.719	164.477	—	—
Official first and second round qualifying results

== Race results ==
Stage 1 Laps: 20

Fin	#	Driver	Team	Make	Pts
1	4	David Gilliland	Kyle Busch Motorsports	Toyota	10
2	21	Johnny Sauter	GMS Racing	Chevrolet	9
3	25	Dalton Sargeant	GMS Racing	Chevrolet	8
4	68	Clay Greenfield	Clay Greenfield Motorsports	Chevrolet	7
5	98	Grant Enfinger	ThorSport Racing	Ford	6
6	8	John Hunter Nemechek	NEMCO Motorsports	Chevrolet	5
7	13	Myatt Snider	ThorSport Racing	Ford	4
8	88	Matt Crafton	ThorSport Racing	Ford	3
9	18	Noah Gragson	Kyle Busch Motorsports	Toyota	2
10	2	Cody Coughlin	GMS Racing	Chevrolet	1

Stage 2 Laps: 20

Fin	#	Driver	Team	Make	Pts
1	21	Johnny Sauter	GMS Racing	Chevrolet	10
2	52	Stewart Friesen	Halmar Friesen Racing	Chevrolet	9
3	4	David Gilliland	Kyle Busch Motorsports	Toyota	8
4	2	Cody Coughlin	GMS Racing	Chevrolet	7
5	88	Matt Crafton	ThorSport Racing	Ford	6
6	24	Justin Haley	GMS Racing	Chevrolet	5
7	75	Parker Kligerman	Henderson Motorsports	Chevrolet	4
8	7	Korbin Forrister	All Out Motorsports	Toyota	3
9	8	John Hunter Nemechek	NEMCO Motorsports	Chevrolet	0
10	51	Spencer Davis	Kyle Busch Motorsports	Toyota	1

Stage 3 Laps: 60

Fin	St	#	Driver	Team	Make	Laps	Led	Status	Pts
1	2	21	Johnny Sauter	GMS Racing	Chevrolet	100	39	running	59
2	12	24	Justin Haley	GMS Racing	Chevrolet	100	9	running	40
3	13	87	Joe Nemechek	NEMCO Motorsports	Chevrolet	100	0	running	34
4	24	41	Ben Rhodes	ThorSport Racing	Ford	100	0	running	33
5	18	20	Scott Lagasse Jr.	Young's Motorsports	Chevrolet	100	0	running	0
6	7	98	Grant Enfinger	ThorSport Racing	Ford	100	2	running	37
7	8	51	Spencer Davis	Kyle Busch Motorsports	Toyota	100	0	running	31
8	4	25	Dalton Sargeant	GMS Racing	Chevrolet	100	2	running	37
9	28	3	Jordan Anderson	Jordan Anderson Racing	Toyota	100	1	running	28
10	17	45	Justin Fontaine	Niece Motorsports	Chevrolet	100	0	running	27
11	11	02	Austin Hill	Young's Motorsports	Chevrolet	100	0	running	26
12	30	49	Wendell Chavous	Premium Motorsports	Chevrolet	100	0	running	25
13	25	15	Robby Lyons	Premium Motorsports	Chevrolet	100	0	running	24
14	29	6	Norm Benning	Norm Benning Racing	Chevrolet	100	0	running	23
15	31	83	Scott Stenzel	Copp Motorsports	Chevrolet	100	0	running	22
16	19	7	Korbin Forrister	All Out Motorsports	Toyota	99	2	running	24
17	10	2	Cody Coughlin	GMS Racing	Chevrolet	99	0	running	28
18	23	28	Bryan Dauzat	FDNY Racing	Chevrolet	99	0	running	19
19	6	88	Matt Crafton	ThorSport Racing	Ford	97	0	running	27
20	15	22	Austin Wayne Self	Niece Motorsports	Chevrolet	97	0	running	17
21	1	4	David Gilliland	Kyle Busch Motorsports	Toyota	95	30	running	34
22	3	68	Clay Greenfield	Clay Greenfield Motorsports	Chevrolet	81	0	crash	22
23	5	18	Noah Gragson	Kyle Busch Motorsports	Toyota	79	1	crash	16
24	20	13	Myatt Snider	ThorSport Racing	Ford	73	0	crash	17
25	14	8	John Hunter Nemechek	NEMCO Motorsports	Chevrolet	72	13	crash	0
26	22	16	Brett Moffitt	Hattori Racing Enterprises	Toyota	72	0	crash	11
27	9	52	Stewart Friesen	Halmar Friesen Racing	Chevrolet	72	1	crash	19
28	26	75	Parker Kligerman	Henderson Motorsports	Chevrolet	66	0	crash	13
29	21	47	Chris Fontaine	Glenden Enterprises	Chevrolet	65	0	electrical	8
30	16	54	Bo LeMastus	DGR-Crosley	Toyota	63	0	crash	7
31	27	10	Jennifer Jo Cobb	Jennifer Jo Cobb Racing	Chevrolet	54	0	crash	6
32	32	50	Travis Kvapil	Beaver Motorsports	Chevrolet	2	0	engine	5
Failed to qualify
33		63	Bobby Gerhart	Bobby Gerhart Racing	Chevrolet				
34		33	Josh Reaume	Reaume Brothers Racing	Chevrolet				
35		74	Cody Ware	Mike Harmon Racing	Chevrolet				
36		1	B. J. McLeod	TJL Motorsports	Chevrolet				

Previous race: 2017 Ford EcoBoost 200	NASCAR Camping World Truck Series; 2018 season	Next race: 2018 Active Pest Control 200
