= 2019 Chevrolet Silverado 250 =

Race details
- Race 18 of 23 in the 2019 NASCAR Gander Outdoors Truck Series season
- Date: August 25, 2019
- Location: Canadian Tire Motorsport Park in Bowmanville, Ontario
- Course: Permanent racing facility
- Course length: 2.459 miles (3.957 km)
- Distance: 64 laps, 157.376 mi (253.272 km)

Pole position
Driver	Brett Moffitt	GMS Racing
- Time: 1:19.482

Most laps led
Driver	Brett Moffitt	GMS Racing
- Laps: 44

Winner
No. 24	Brett Moffitt	GMS Racing

Television in the United States
- Network: FS1

Radio in the United States
- Radio: MRN

The 2019 Chevrolet Silverado 250 was a NASCAR Gander Outdoors Truck Series race held on August 25, 2019, at Canadian Tire Motorsport Park in Bowmanville, Ontario, Canada. Contested over 64 laps on the 2.459-mile (3.957 km) road course, it was the 18th race of the 2019 NASCAR Gander Outdoors Truck Series season, the second race of the Playoffs, the second race of the Round of 8, and the final race at Mosport until the 2027 season.

== Background ==
=== Track ===
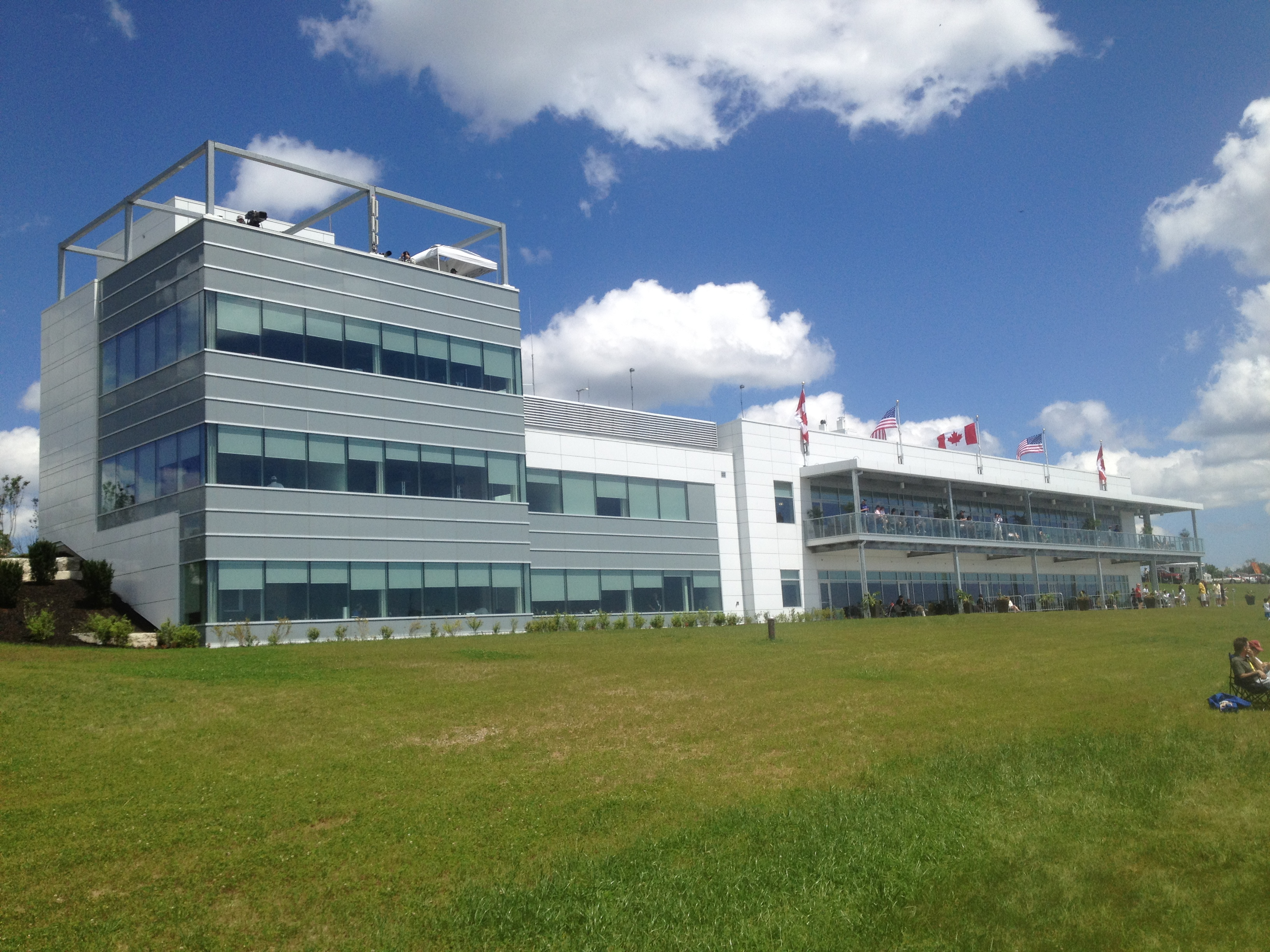
The event centre of Canadian Tire Motorsport Park, the track where the race was held.

Canadian Tire Motorsport Park is a multi-track motorsport venue located north of Bowmanville, in Ontario, Canada. The facility features a 2.459-mile (3.957 km), (length reduced through wider track re-surfacing done in 2003) 10-turn road course; a 2.9 km advance driver and race driver training facility with a quarter-mile skid pad (Driver Development Centre) and a 1.5 km kart track (Mosport Kartways). The name "Mosport" is a portmanteau of Motor Sport, came from the enterprise formed to build the track.

== Entry list ==
No.	Driver	Team	Manufacturer
0	Ray Ciccarelli	Jennifer Jo Cobb Racing	Chevrolet
02	D. J. Kennington (Note: Tyler Dippel was entered for the No. 02 but was suspended by NASCAR on Friday before the race for violating the Member Conduct Guidelines of the NASCAR Rule Book. D. J. Kennington replaced Dippel in the No. 02 as a result.)	Young's Motorsports	Chevrolet
2	Sheldon Creed (R)	GMS Racing	Chevrolet
3	Jordan Anderson	Jordan Anderson Racing	Chevrolet
04	Roger Reuse (Note: This was a Jordan Anderson Racing entry using Roper Racing's owners points, and was also a Chevrolet truck instead of Ford.)	Jordan Anderson Racing	Chevrolet
4	Todd Gilliland	Kyle Busch Motorsports	Toyota
6	Norm Benning	Norm Benning Racing	Chevrolet
8	Josh Reaume (Note: This was a Reaume Brothers Racing entry using NEMCO Motorsports' owners points, and was also a Toyota truck instead of Chevrolet.)	Reaume Brothers Racing	Toyota
10	Jennifer Jo Cobb	Jennifer Jo Cobb Racing	Chevrolet
12	Gus Dean (R)	Young's Motorsports	Chevrolet
13	Johnny Sauter	ThorSport Racing	Ford
16	Austin Hill	Hattori Racing Enterprises	Toyota
17	Tyler Ankrum (R)	DGR-Crosley	Toyota
18	Harrison Burton (R)	Kyle Busch Motorsports	Toyota
20	Dylan Lupton	Young's Motorsports	Chevrolet
22	Austin Wayne Self	AM Racing	Chevrolet
24	Brett Moffitt	GMS Racing	Chevrolet
32	Gregory Rayl	Reaume Brothers Racing	Toyota
33	Dan Corcoran	Reaume Brothers Racing	Chevrolet
34	Jason White	Reaume Brothers Racing	Chevrolet
44	Gary Klutt	Niece Motorsports	Chevrolet
45	Ross Chastain	Niece Motorsports	Chevrolet
51	Alex Tagliani	Kyle Busch Motorsports	Toyota
52	Stewart Friesen	Halmar Friesen Racing	Chevrolet
54	Raphaël Lessard	DGR-Crosley	Toyota
56	Bobby Reuse (Note: This was a Jordan Anderson Racing entry using Hill Motorsports' owners points.)	Jordan Anderson Racing	Chevrolet
88	Matt Crafton	ThorSport Racing	Ford
98	Grant Enfinger	ThorSport Racing	Ford
99	Ben Rhodes	ThorSport Racing	Ford

== Practice ==
=== First practice ===
Todd Gilliland was the fastest in the first practice session with a time of 79.617 seconds and a speed of 111.187 mph (178.938 km/h).

Pos	No.	Driver	Team	Manufacturer	Time	Speed
1	4	Todd Gilliland	Kyle Busch Motorsports	Toyota	1:19.617	111.187
2	18	Harrison Burton (R)	Kyle Busch Motorsports	Toyota	1:20.179	110.408
3	51	Alex Tagliani	Kyle Busch Motorsports	Toyota	1:20.239	110.325

=== Final practice ===
Brett Moffitt was the fastest in the final practice session with a time of 79.540 seconds and a speed of 111.295 mph (179.112 km/h).

Pos	No.	Driver	Team	Manufacturer	Time	Speed
1	24	Brett Moffitt	GMS Racing	Chevrolet	1:19.540	111.295
2	16	Austin Hill	Hattori Racing Enterprises	Toyota	1:20.054	110.580
3	13	Johnny Sauter	ThorSport Racing	Ford	1:20.463	110.018

== Qualifying ==
Brett Moffitt scored the pole for the race with a time of 79.482 seconds and a speed of 111.376 mph (179.242 km/h).

=== Qualifying results ===
Pos	No	Driver	Team	Manufacturer	Time
1	24	Brett Moffitt	GMS Racing	Chevrolet	1:19.482
2	4	Todd Gilliland	Kyle Busch Motorsports	Toyota	1:19.578
3	45	Ross Chastain	Niece Motorsports	Chevrolet	1:19.581
4	51	Alex Tagliani	Kyle Busch Motorsports	Toyota	1:19.796
5	99	Ben Rhodes	ThorSport Racing	Ford	1:20.047
6	16	Austin Hill	Hattori Racing Enterprises	Toyota	1:20.398
7	18	Harrison Burton (R)	Kyle Busch Motorsports	Toyota	1:20.669
8	17	Tyler Ankrum (R)	DGR-Crosley	Toyota	1:20.720
9	54	Raphaël Lessard	DGR-Crosley	Toyota	1:20.970
10	88	Matt Crafton	ThorSport Racing	Ford	1:21.105
11	44	Gary Klutt	Niece Motorsports	Chevrolet	1:21.458
12	52	Stewart Friesen	Halmar Friesen Racing	Chevrolet	1:20.586
13	13	Johnny Sauter	ThorSport Racing	Ford	1:20.823
14	98	Grant Enfinger	ThorSport Racing	Ford	1:20.894
15	02	D. J. Kennington	Young's Motorsports	Chevrolet	1:21.178
16	20	Dylan Lupton	Young's Motorsports	Chevrolet	1:21.452
17	2	Sheldon Creed (R)	GMS Racing	Chevrolet	1:21.821
18	22	Austin Wayne Self	AM Racing	Chevrolet	1:22.059
19	34	Jason White	Reaume Brothers Racing	Chevrolet	1:23.852
20	3	Jordan Anderson	Jordan Anderson Racing	Chevrolet	1:23.997
21	12	Gus Dean (R)	Young's Motorsports	Chevrolet	1:24.251
22	33	Dan Corcoran	Reaume Brothers Racing	Chevrolet	1:26.470
23	56	Bobby Reuse	Jordan Anderson Racing	Chevrolet	1:27.249
24	10	Jennifer Jo Cobb	Jennifer Jo Cobb Racing	Chevrolet	1:30.024
25	8	Josh Reaume	Reaume Brothers Racing	Toyota	1:30.142
26	04	Roger Reuse	Jordan Anderson Racing	Chevrolet	1:30.887
27	32	Gregory Rayl	Reaume Brothers Racing	Toyota	1:39.056
28	0	Ray Ciccarelli	Jennifer Jo Cobb Racing	Chevrolet	1:42.854
29	6	Norm Benning	Norm Benning Racing	Chevrolet	0.000

. – Playoffs driver

== Race ==
=== Summary ===
Brett Moffitt started on pole and dominated the first stage, winning it after leading all of the laps. Todd Gilliland spun during stage 1, but pitted and managed to stay on the lead lap. Johnny Sauter and Grant Enfinger made contact, sending Enfinger spinning, though he was able to prevent his truck from hitting the wall. On lap 31, Dan Corcoran spun and wrecked. Ross Chastain stayed out during the caution and won Stage 2.

After Stage 2 pit stops, Moffitt regained the lead after jumping ahead of Alex Tagliani. Moffitt was able to win his second consecutive race with a 5-second lead over Tagliani.

=== Stage Results ===
Stage One Laps: 20

Pos	No	Driver	Team	Manufacturer	Points
1	24	Brett Moffitt	GMS Racing	Chevrolet	10
2	45	Ross Chastain	Niece Motorsports	Chevrolet	9
3	16	Austin Hill	Hattori Racing Enterprises	Toyota	8
4	17	Tyler Ankrum (R)	DGR-Crosley	Toyota	7
5	88	Matt Crafton	ThorSport Racing	Ford	6
6	13	Johnny Sauter	ThorSport Racing	Ford	5
7	52	Stewart Friesen	Halmar Friesen Racing	Chevrolet	4
8	98	Grant Enfinger	ThorSport Racing	Ford	3
9	22	Austin Wayne Self	AM Racing	Chevrolet	2
10	02	D. J. Kennington	Young's Motorsports	Chevrolet	1

Stage Two Laps: 20

Pos	No	Driver	Team	Manufacturer	Points
1	45	Ross Chastain	Niece Motorsports	Chevrolet	10
2	16	Austin Hill	Hattori Racing Enterprises	Toyota	9
3	17	Tyler Ankrum (R)	DGR-Crosley	Toyota	8
4	98	Grant Enfinger	ThorSport Racing	Ford	7
5	13	Johnny Sauter	ThorSport Racing	Ford	6
6	88	Matt Crafton	ThorSport Racing	Ford	5
7	24	Brett Moffitt	GMS Racing	Chevrolet	4
8	51	Alex Tagliani	Kyle Busch Motorsports	Toyota	3
9	99	Ben Rhodes	ThorSport Racing	Ford	2
10	18	Harrison Burton (R)	Kyle Busch Motorsports	Toyota	1

=== Final Stage Results ===
Stage Three Laps: 24

Pos	Grid	No	Driver	Team	Manufacturer	Laps	Points
1	1	24	Brett Moffitt	GMS Racing	Chevrolet	64	54
2	4	51	Alex Tagliani	Kyle Busch Motorsports	Toyota	64	38
3	5	99	Ben Rhodes	ThorSport Racing	Ford	64	36
4	17	2	Sheldon Creed (R)	GMS Racing	Chevrolet	64	33
5	6	16	Austin Hill	Hattori Racing Enterprises	Toyota	64	49
6	13	13	Johnny Sauter	ThorSport Racing	Ford	64	42
7	12	52	Stewart Friesen	Halmar Friesen Racing	Chevrolet	64	34
8	3	45	Ross Chastain	Niece Motorsports	Chevrolet	64	48
9	8	17	Tyler Ankrum (R)	DGR-Crosley	Toyota	64	43
10	9	54	Raphaël Lessard	DGR-Crosley	Toyota	64	27
11	10	88	Matt Crafton	ThorSport Racing	Ford	64	37
12	11	44	Gary Klutt	Niece Motorsports	Chevrolet	64	25
13	14	98	Grant Enfinger	ThorSport Racing	Ford	64	34
14	18	22	Austin Wayne Self	AM Racing	Chevrolet	64	25
15	15	02	D. J. Kennington	Young's Motorsports	Chevrolet	64	23
16	20	3	Jordan Anderson	Jordan Anderson Racing	Chevrolet	64	21
17	21	12	Gus Dean (R)	Young's Motorsports	Chevrolet	64	20
18	2	4	Todd Gilliland	Kyle Busch Motorsports	Toyota	64	19
19	16	20	Dylan Lupton	Young's Motorsports	Chevrolet	63	18
20	19	34	Jason White	Reaume Brothers Racing	Chevrolet	63	17
21	7	18	Harrison Burton (R)	Kyle Busch Motorsports	Toyota	62	17
22	23	56	Bobby Reuse	Jordan Anderson Racing	Chevrolet	62	15
23	24	10	Jennifer Jo Cobb	Jennifer Jo Cobb Racing	Chevrolet	60	14
24	29	6	Norm Benning	Norm Benning Racing	Chevrolet	60	13
25	26	04	Roger Reuse	Jordan Anderson Racing	Chevrolet	58	12
26	25	8	Josh Reaume	Reaume Brothers Racing	Toyota	50	11
27	22	33	Dan Corcoran	Reaume Brothers Racing	Chevrolet	27	10
28	27	32	Gregory Rayl	Reaume Brothers Racing	Toyota	4	9
29	28	0	Ray Ciccarelli	Jennifer Jo Cobb Racing	Chevrolet	2	8

. – Playoffs driver

== Notes ==
Previous race: 2019 UNOH 200	NASCAR Gander Outdoors Truck Series; 2019 season	Next race: 2019 World of Westgate 200
