= 2019 NASCAR Hall of Fame 200 =

Race details
- Race 21 of 23 in the 2019 NASCAR Gander Outdoors Truck Series season
- Martinsville Speedway
- Date: October 26, 2019
- Location: Martinsville Speedway in Ridgeway, Virginia
- Course: Permanent racing facility
- Course length: 0.526 miles (0.847 km)
- Distance: 200 laps, 105.2 mi (169.3 km)

Pole position
Driver	Christian Eckes	Kyle Busch Motorsports
- Time: 19.844

Most laps led
Driver	Brett Moffitt	GMS Racing
- Laps: 80

Winner
No. 4	Todd Gilliland	Kyle Busch Motorsports

Television in the United States
- Network: FS1

Radio in the United States
- Radio: MRN

The 2019 NASCAR Hall of Fame 200 was a NASCAR Gander Outdoors Truck Series race held on October 26, 2019, at Martinsville Speedway in Ridgeway, Virginia. Contested over 200 laps on the .526 mile (.847 km) paperclip-shaped short track, it was the 21st race of the 2019 NASCAR Gander Outdoors Truck Series season, fifth race of the Playoffs, and second race of the Round of 6.

== Background ==
=== Track ===
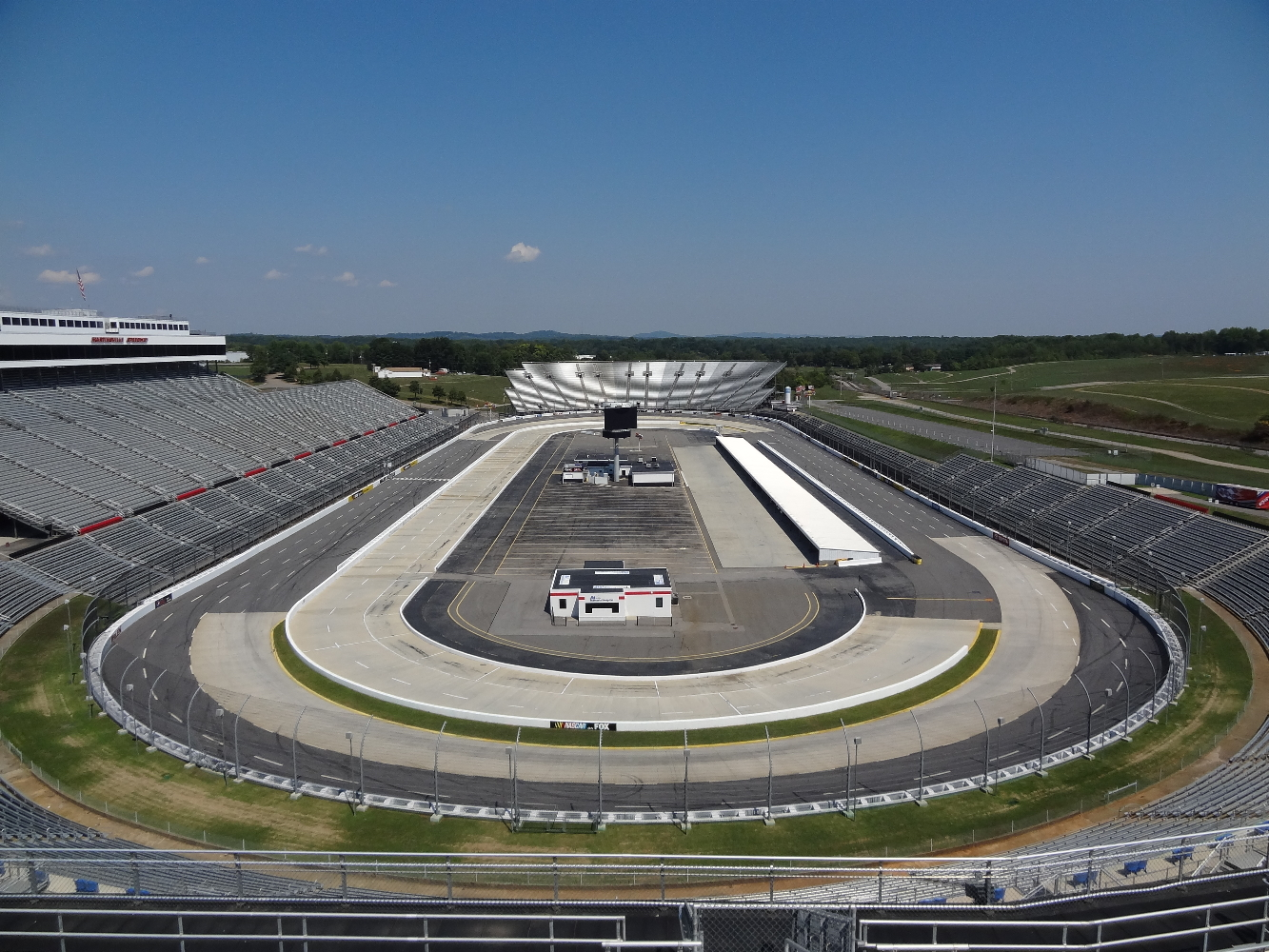
Martinsville Speedway, the track where the race was held.

Martinsville Speedway is an International Speedway Corporation-owned NASCAR stock car racing track located in Henry County, in Ridgeway, Virginia, just to the south of Martinsville. At 0.526 miles (0.847 km) in length, it is the shortest track in the Monster Energy NASCAR Cup Series. The track was also one of the first paved oval tracks in NASCAR, being built in 1947 by H. Clay Earles. It is also the only remaining race track that has been on the NASCAR circuit from its beginning in 1948.

== Entry list ==
No.	Driver	Team	Manufacturer
0	Cody McMahan	Jennifer Jo Cobb Racing	Chevrolet
02	Tyler Dippel (R)	Young's Motorsports	Chevrolet
2	Sheldon Creed (R)	GMS Racing	Chevrolet
3	Jordan Anderson	Jordan Anderson Racing	Chevrolet
4	Todd Gilliland	Kyle Busch Motorsports	Toyota
6	Norm Benning	Norm Benning Racing	Chevrolet
8	John Hunter Nemechek (i)	NEMCO Motorsports	Chevrolet
9	Codie Rohrbaugh	CR7 Motorsports	Chevrolet
10	Jennifer Jo Cobb	Jennifer Jo Cobb Racing	Chevrolet
12	Gus Dean (R)	Young's Motorsports	Chevrolet
13	Johnny Sauter	ThorSport Racing	Ford
15	Tanner Gray (R)	DGR-Crosley	Toyota
16	Austin Hill	Hattori Racing Enterprises	Toyota
17	Tyler Ankrum (R)	DGR-Crosley	Toyota
18	Harrison Burton (R)	Kyle Busch Motorsports	Toyota
20	Spencer Boyd (R)	Young's Motorsports	Chevrolet
21	Sam Mayer	GMS Racing	Chevrolet
22	Austin Wayne Self	AM Racing	Chevrolet
24	Brett Moffitt	GMS Racing	Chevrolet
30	Danny Bohn (R)	On Point Motorsports	Toyota
33	Dawson Cram	Reaume Brothers Racing	Chevrolet
34	Josh Reaume	Reaume Brothers Racing	Toyota
44	Jeb Burton (i)	Niece Motorsports	Chevrolet
45	Ross Chastain	Niece Motorsports	Chevrolet
49	Ray Ciccarelli	CMI Motorsports	Chevrolet
51	Christian Eckes	Kyle Busch Motorsports	Toyota
52	Stewart Friesen	Halmar Friesen Racing	Chevrolet
54	Natalie Decker (R)	DGR-Crosley	Toyota
56	Timmy Hill (i)	Hill Motorsports	Chevrolet
88	Matt Crafton	ThorSport Racing	Ford
98	Grant Enfinger	ThorSport Racing	Ford
99	Ben Rhodes	ThorSport Racing	Ford

== Practice ==
=== First practice ===
Christian Eckes was the fastest in the first practice session with a time of 19.851 seconds and a speed of 95.391 mph (153.517 km/h).

Pos	No.	Driver	Team	Manufacturer	Time	Speed
1	51	Christian Eckes	Kyle Busch Motorsports	Toyota	19.851	95.391
2	45	Ross Chastain	Niece Motorsports	Chevrolet	20.004	94.661
3	2	Sheldon Creed (R)	GMS Racing	Chevrolet	20.043	94.477

=== Final practice ===
Todd Gilliland was the fastest in the final practice session with a time of 19.788 seconds and a speed of 95.694 mph (154.005 km/h).

Pos	No.	Driver	Team	Manufacturer	Time	Speed
1	4	Todd Gilliland	Kyle Busch Motorsports	Toyota	19.788	95.694
2	18	Harrison Burton (R)	Kyle Busch Motorsports	Toyota	19.881	95.247
3	24	Brett Moffitt	GMS Racing	Chevrolet	19.897	95.170

== Qualifying ==
Christian Eckes scored the pole for the race with a time of 19.844 seconds and a speed of 95.424 mph (153.570 km/h).

=== Qualifying results ===
Pos	No	Driver	Team	Manufacturer	Time
1	51	Christian Eckes	Kyle Busch Motorsports	Toyota	19.844
2	24	Brett Moffitt	GMS Racing	Chevrolet	19.860
3	18	Harrison Burton (R)	Kyle Busch Motorsports	Toyota	19.908
4	88	Matt Crafton	ThorSport Racing	Ford	19.926
5	17	Tyler Ankrum (R)	DGR-Crosley	Toyota	19.940
6	13	Johnny Sauter	ThorSport Racing	Ford	19.951
7	52	Stewart Friesen	Halmar Friesen Racing	Chevrolet	19.954
8	99	Ben Rhodes	ThorSport Racing	Ford	19.987
9	98	Grant Enfinger	ThorSport Racing	Ford	20.003
10	8	John Hunter Nemechek (i)	NEMCO Motorsports	Chevrolet	20.007
11	4	Todd Gilliland	Kyle Busch Motorsports	Toyota	20.013
12	45	Ross Chastain	Niece Motorsports	Chevrolet	20.059
13	02	Tyler Dippel (R)	Young's Motorsports	Chevrolet	20.064
14	2	Sheldon Creed (R)	GMS Racing	Chevrolet	20.119
15	15	Tanner Gray (R)	DGR-Crosley	Toyota	20.137
16	12	Gus Dean (R)	Young's Motorsports	Chevrolet	20.175
17	16	Austin Hill	Hattori Racing Enterprises	Toyota	20.183
18	9	Codie Rohrbaugh	CR7 Motorsports	Chevrolet	20.226
19	30	Danny Bohn (R)	On Point Motorsports	Toyota	20.244
20	22	Austin Wayne Self	AM Racing	Chevrolet	20.245
21	21	Sam Mayer	GMS Racing	Chevrolet	20.245
22	56	Timmy Hill (i)	Hill Motorsports	Chevrolet	20.267
23	20	Spencer Boyd	Young's Motorsports	Chevrolet	20.338
24	44	Jeb Burton (i)	Niece Motorsports	Chevrolet	20.489
25	3	Jordan Anderson	Jordan Anderson Racing	Chevrolet	20.527
26	54	Natalie Decker (R)	DGR-Crosley	Toyota	20.715
27	33	Dawson Cram	Reaume Brothers Racing	Chevrolet	20.844
28	49	Ray Ciccarelli	CMI Motorsports	Chevrolet	20.990
29	34	Josh Reaume	Reaume Brothers Racing	Toyota	21.414
30	6	Norm Benning	Norm Benning Racing	Chevrolet	21.624
31	10	Jennifer Jo Cobb	Jennifer Jo Cobb Racing	Chevrolet	22.116
32	0	Cody McMahan	Jennifer Jo Cobb Racing	Chevrolet	32.067

. – Playoffs driver

== Race ==
=== Summary ===
Christian Eckes started on pole, but Brett Moffitt took the lead from him and held it until the end of Stage 1. One caution occurred during Stage 1 for Ray Ciccarelli spinning.

In Stage 2, Tanner Gray spun on lap 78 and brought out a caution. The leaders pitted, giving the lead to Grant Enfinger on lap 82, while Matt Crafton stalled out with engine issues. Sam Mayer took the lead on the restart and held it to the end of the second stage.

Stage 3 began with several wrecks; the first occurring when Natalie Decker collided with Jeb Burton and collected Moffitt, Dawson Cram, and Tyler Dippel. Another caution occurred immediately after the restart as Ross Chastain slipped past Mayer before Mayer was involved in a wreck that also involved Austin Hill, Tyler Ankrum, Enfinger, and Todd Gilliland, which brought out a lengthy red flag. The race afterwards had numerous cautions; Ciccarelli spun again, while Stewart Friesen was turned by Johnny Sauter. Eckes briefly took the lead away from Chastain but lost it soon after, while Spencer Boyd collided with Jordan Anderson, also collecting Norm Benning and Ben Rhodes.

With 20 laps remaining, Jennifer Jo Cobb's truck lost an axle, and Gilliland passed Chastain for the lead on the restart with 10 laps left. The final caution came on lap 194 when Decker and Anderson collided and collected Gus Dean, setting up an overtime.

Harrison Burton had contact with Chastain on the final lap, beginning a series of incidents. Gilliland survived the incidents and took the victory, with Chastain finishing second. Timmy Hill notably earned his best finish of 5th place in the race.

Similarly to the previous week's race, none of the playoffs drivers had locked themselves into the final round due to a non-playoffs driver winning the race. Crafton and Ankrum left the race below the cutoff line.

Fox Sports 1 was heavily criticized for cutting off the live feed of the race's final two laps in order to switch to the college football game between the Oklahoma State Cowboys and the Iowa State Cyclones. As a result, NASCAR fans not in attendance missed Gilliland's win.

=== Stage results ===
Stage One Laps: 50

Pos	No	Driver	Team	Manufacturer	Points
1	24	Brett Moffitt	GMS Racing	Chevrolet	10
2	51	Christian Eckes	Kyle Busch Motorsports	Toyota	9
3	99	Ben Rhodes	ThorSport Racing	Ford	8
4	88	Matt Crafton	ThorSport Racing	Ford	7
5	13	Johnny Sauter	ThorSport Racing	Ford	6
6	18	Harrison Burton (R)	Kyle Busch Motorsports	Toyota	5
7	17	Tyler Ankrum (R)	DGR-Crosley	Toyota	4
8	52	Stewart Friesen	Halmar Friesen Racing	Chevrolet	3
9	98	Grant Enfinger	ThorSport Racing	Ford	2
10	45	Ross Chastain	Niece Motorsports	Chevrolet	1

Stage Two Laps: 50

Pos	No	Driver	Team	Manufacturer	Points
1	21	Sam Mayer	GMS Racing	Chevrolet	10
2	98	Grant Enfinger	ThorSport Racing	Ford	9
3	16	Austin Hill	Hattori Racing Enterprises	Toyota	8
4	45	Ross Chastain	Niece Motorsports	Chevrolet	7
5	51	Christian Eckes	Kyle Busch Motorsports	Toyota	6
6	02	Tyler Dippel (R)	Young's Motorsports	Chevrolet	5
7	24	Brett Moffitt	GMS Racing	Chevrolet	4
8	13	Johnny Sauter	ThorSport Racing	Ford	3
9	30	Danny Bohn (R)	On Point Motorsports	Toyota	2
10	52	Stewart Friesen	Halmar Friesen Racing	Chevrolet	1

=== Final Stage results ===
Stage Three Laps: 100

Pos	Grid	No	Driver	Team	Manufacturer	Laps	Points
1	11	4	Todd Gilliland	Kyle Busch Motorsports	Toyota	201	40
2	12	45	Ross Chastain	Niece Motorsports	Chevrolet	201	43
3	6	13	Johnny Sauter	ThorSport Racing	Ford	201	43
4	9	98	Grant Enfinger	ThorSport Racing	Ford	201	44
5	22	56	Timmy Hill (i)	Hill Motorsports	Chevrolet	201	0
6	7	52	Stewart Friesen	Halmar Friesen Racing	Chevrolet	201	35
7	10	8	John Hunter Nemechek (i)	NEMCO Motorsports	Chevrolet	201	0
8	19	30	Danny Bohn (R)	On Point Motorsports	Toyota	201	31
9	24	44	Jeb Burton (i)	Niece Motorsports	Chevrolet	201	0
10	18	9	Codie Rohrbaugh	CR7 Motorsports	Chevrolet	201	27
11	14	2	Sheldon Creed (R)	GMS Racing	Chevrolet	201	26
12	25	3	Jordan Anderson	Jordan Anderson Racing	Chevrolet	201	25
13	27	33	Dawson Cram	Reaume Brothers Racing	Chevrolet	201	24
14	16	12	Gus Dean (R)	Young's Motorsports	Chevrolet	201	23
15	23	20	Spencer Boyd (R)	Young's Motorsports	Chevrolet	201	22
16	8	99	Ben Rhodes	ThorSport Racing	Ford	201	29
17	1	51	Christian Eckes	Kyle Busch Motorsports	Toyota	201	35
18	3	18	Harrison Burton (R)	Kyle Busch Motorsports	Toyota	201	24
19	20	22	Austin Wayne Self	AM Racing	Chevrolet	201	18
20	15	15	Tanner Gray (R)	DGR-Crosley	Toyota	201	17
21	28	49	Ray Ciccarelli	CMI Motorsports	Chevrolet	199	16
22	26	54	Natalie Decker (R)	DGR-Crosley	Toyota	199	15
23	4	88	Matt Crafton	ThorSport Racing	Ford	193	21
24	30	6	Norm Benning	Norm Benning Racing	Chevrolet	163	13
25	5	17	Tyler Ankrum (R)	DGR-Crosley	Toyota	133	16
26	17	16	Austin Hill	Hattori Racing Enterprises	Toyota	127	19
27	31	10	Jennifer Jo Cobb	Jennifer Jo Cobb Racing	Chevrolet	127	10
28	21	21	Sam Mayer	GMS Racing	Chevrolet	122	19
29	2	24	Brett Moffitt	GMS Racing	Chevrolet	122	22
30	13	02	Tyler Dippel (R)	Young's Motorsports	Chevrolet	121	12
31	29	34	Josh Reaume	Reaume Brothers Racing	Toyota	37	6
32	32	0	Cody McMahan	Jennifer Jo Cobb Racing	Chevrolet	0	5

. – Driver advanced to the next round of the playoffs.

. – Playoffs driver

Previous race: 2019 Sugarlands Shine 250	NASCAR Gander Outdoors Truck Series; 2019 season	Next race: 2019 Lucas Oil 150
