= 2019 Sugarlands Shine 250 =

Race details
- Race 20 of 23 in the 2019 NASCAR Gander Outdoors Truck Series season
- Date: October 12, 2019
- Location: Talladega Superspeedway in Lincoln, Alabama
- Course: Permanent racing facility
- Course length: 4.28 km (2.66 miles)
- Distance: 94 laps, 250.04 mi (402.4 km)

Pole position
| Driver | Matt Crafton | ThorSport Racing |
- Time: 52.928

Most laps led
| Driver | Johnny Sauter | ThorSport Racing |
- Laps: 28

Winner
| No. 20 | Spencer Boyd | Young's Motorsports |

Television in the United States
- Network: FS1

Radio in the United States
- Radio: MRN

The 2019 Sugarlands Shine 250 is a NASCAR Gander Outdoors Truck Series race held on October 12, 2019, at Talladega Superspeedway in Lincoln, Alabama. Contested over 94 laps on the 2.66 mile (4.28 km) superspeedway, it was the 20th race of the 2019 NASCAR Gander Outdoors Truck Series season, fourth race of the Playoffs, and first race of the Round of 6.

== Background ==
=== Track ===
Talladega Superspeedway, the track where the race was held

Talladega Superspeedway, formerly known as Alabama International Motor Speedway, is a motorsports complex located north of Talladega, Alabama. It is located on the former Anniston Air Force Base in the small city of Lincoln. A tri-oval, the track was constructed in 1969 by the International Speedway Corporation, a business controlled by the France family. Talladega is most known for its steep banking. The track currently hosts NASCAR's Monster Energy NASCAR Cup Series, Xfinity Series and Gander Outdoors Truck Series. Talladega is the longest NASCAR oval with a length of 2.66-mile-long (4.28 km) tri-oval like the Daytona International Speedway, which is a 2.5-mile-long (4.0 km).

== Entry list ==
| No. | Driver | Team | Manufacturer |
|---|---|---|---|
| 02 | Tyler Dippel (R) | Young's Motorsports | Chevrolet |
| 2 | Sheldon Creed (R) | GMS Racing | Chevrolet |
| 3 | Jordan Anderson | Jordan Anderson Racing | Chevrolet |
| 4 | Todd Gilliland | Kyle Busch Motorsports | Toyota |
| 6 | Norm Benning | Norm Benning Racing | Chevrolet |
| 7 | Korbin Forrister | All Out Motorsports | Toyota |
| 8 | John Hunter Nemechek (i) | NEMCO Motorsports | Chevrolet |
| 9 | Codie Rohrbaugh | CR7 Motorsports | Chevrolet |
| 10 | Jennifer Jo Cobb | Jennifer Jo Cobb Racing | Chevrolet |
| 12 | Gus Dean (R) | Young's Motorsports | Chevrolet |
| 13 | Johnny Sauter | ThorSport Racing | Ford |
| 15 | Anthony Alfredo (R) | DGR-Crosley | Toyota |
| 16 | Austin Hill | Hattori Racing Enterprises | Toyota |
| 17 | Tyler Ankrum (R) | DGR-Crosley | Toyota |
| 18 | Harrison Burton (R) | Kyle Busch Motorsports | Toyota |
| 20 | Spencer Boyd (R) | Young's Motorsports | Chevrolet |
| 22 | Austin Wayne Self | AM Racing | Chevrolet |
| 24 | Brett Moffitt | GMS Racing | Chevrolet |
| 28 | Bryan Dauzat | FDNY Racing | Chevrolet |
| 30 | Brennan Poole (R) | On Point Motorsports | Toyota |
| 33 | Mason Massey | Reaume Brothers Racing | Chevrolet |
| 34 | Jesse Iwuji | Reaume Brothers Racing | Toyota |
| 44 | Angela Ruch | Niece Motorsports | Chevrolet |
| 45 | Ross Chastain | Niece Motorsports | Chevrolet |
| 51 | Riley Herbst | Kyle Busch Motorsports | Toyota |
| 52 | Stewart Friesen | Halmar Friesen Racing | Chevrolet |
| 54 | Natalie Decker (R) | DGR-Crosley | Toyota |
| 68 | Clay Greenfield | Clay Greenfield Motorsports | Toyota |
| 87 | Timothy Peters | NEMCO Motorsports | Chevrolet |
| 88 | Matt Crafton | ThorSport Racing | Ford |
| 98 | Grant Enfinger | ThorSport Racing | Ford |
| 99 | Ben Rhodes | ThorSport Racing | Ford |

== Practice ==
=== First practice ===
Austin Hill was the fastest in the first practice session with a time of 49.857 seconds and a speed of 193.115 mph (310.788 km/h).

| Pos | No. | Driver | Team | Manufacturer | Time | Speed |
|---|---|---|---|---|---|---|
| 1 | 16 | Austin Hill | Hattori Racing Enterprises | Toyota | 49.857 | 193.115 |
| 2 | 68 | Clay Greenfield | Clay Greenfield Motorsports | Toyota | 49.611 | 193.022 |
| 3 | 87 | Timothy Peters | NEMCO Motorsports | Chevrolet | 49.630 | 192.948 |
Official first practice results

=== Final practice ===
Harrison Burton was the fastest in the final practice session with a time of 50.646 seconds and a speed of 189.077 mph (304.290 km/h).

| Pos | No. | Driver | Team | Manufacturer | Time | Speed |
|---|---|---|---|---|---|---|
| 1 | 18 | Harrison Burton | Kyle Busch Motorsports | Toyota | 50.646 | 189.077 |
| 2 | 4 | Todd Gilliland | Kyle Busch Motorsports | Toyota | 50.656 | 189.040 |
| 3 | 17 | Tyler Ankrum | DGR-Crosley | Toyota | 50.670 | 188.988 |
Official final practice results

== Qualifying ==
Matt Crafton scored the pole for the race with a time of 52.928 seconds and a speed of 180.925 mph (291.171 km/h).

=== Qualifying results ===
| Pos | No | Driver | Team | Manufacturer | Time |
|---|---|---|---|---|---|
| 1 | 88 | Matt Crafton | ThorSport Racing | Ford | 52.928 |
| 2 | 17 | Tyler Ankrum (R) | DGR-Crosley | Toyota | 52.941 |
| 3 | 18 | Harrison Burton (R) | Kyle Busch Motorsports | Toyota | 53.097 |
| 4 | 13 | Johnny Sauter | ThorSport Racing | Ford | 53.149 |
| 5 | 2 | Sheldon Creed (R) | GMS Racing | Chevrolet | 53.183 |
| 6 | 4 | Todd Gilliland | Kyle Busch Motorsports | Toyota | 53.223 |
| 7 | 51 | Riley Herbst | Kyle Busch Motorsports | Toyota | 53.248 |
| 8 | 24 | Brett Moffitt | GMS Racing | Chevrolet | 53.291 |
| 9 | 7 | Korbin Forrister | All Out Motorsports | Toyota | 53.357 |
| 10 | 52 | Stewart Friesen | Halmar Friesen Racing | Chevrolet | 53.385 |
| 11 | 9 | Codie Rohrbaugh | CR7 Motorsports | Chevrolet | 53.520 |
| 12 | 22 | Austin Wayne Self | AM Racing | Chevrolet | 53.567 |
| 13 | 16 | Austin Hill | Hattori Racing Enterprises | Toyota | 53.664 |
| 14 | 98 | Grant Enfinger | ThorSport Racing | Ford | 53.707 |
| 15 | 99 | Ben Rhodes | ThorSport Racing | Ford | 53.827 |
| 16 | 15 | Anthony Alfredo (R) | DGR-Crosley | Toyota | 53.882 |
| 17 | 45 | Ross Chastain | Niece Motorsports | Chevrolet | 53.904 |
| 18 | 30 | Brennan Poole (R) | On Point Motorsports | Toyota | 53.937 |
| 19 | 54 | Natalie Decker (R) | DGR-Crosley | Toyota | 53.946 |
| 20 | 12 | Gus Dean (R) | Young's Motorsports | Chevrolet | 54.044 |
| 21 | 02 | Tyler Dippel (R) | Young's Motorsports | Chevrolet | 54.073 |
| 22 | 87 | Timothy Peters | NEMCO Motorsports | Chevrolet | 54.088 |
| 23 | 28 | Bryan Dauzat | FDNY Racing | Chevrolet | 54.100 |
| 24 | 68 | Clay Greenfield | Clay Greenfield Motorsports | Toyota | 54.289 |
| 25 | 20 | Spencer Boyd (R) | Young's Motorsports | Chevrolet | 54.360 |
| 26 | 44 | Angela Ruch | Niece Motorsports | Chevrolet | 54.569 |
| 27 | 8 | John Hunter Nemechek (i) | NEMCO Motorsports | Chevrolet | 54.665 |
| 28 | 10 | Jennifer Jo Cobb | Jennifer Jo Cobb Racing | Chevrolet | 55.019 |
| 29 | 33 | Mason Massey | Reaume Brothers Racing | Chevrolet | 55.426 |
| 30 | 3 | Jordan Anderson | Jordan Anderson Racing | Chevrolet | 55.501 |
| 31 | 6 | Norm Benning | Norm Benning Racing | Chevrolet | 55.858 |
| 32 | 34 | Jesse Iwuji | Reaume Brothers Racing | Toyota | 56.008 |

. – Playoffs driver

== Race ==
=== Summary ===
Matt Crafton started on pole, but was overtaken by Todd Gilliland in the second lap. Johnny Sauter took the lead afterwards, but also lost it, to Sheldon Creed. The first caution occurred when Harrison Burton spun in the tri-oval. Creed maintained the lead and won Stage 1.

Ross Chastain took the lead, but Tyler Dippel wrecked and brought out a caution. During stage 2, Moffitt and Friesen were found to be locking bumpers, causing NASCAR officials to force them to take a pass-through penalty. Both teams and some of the broadcasters disagreed with NASCAR’s assessment. Stewart Friesen won Stage 2 after passing Brett Moffitt and Austin Hill.

On lap 87, a large wreck occurred that took out Chastain after he turned across Creed's nose while trying to maintain his lead. In the final lap, Johnny Sauter held the lead until the tri-oval, where a block on Riley Herbst forced Herbst below the double yellow line. After NASCAR reviewed the footage, they deemed that Sauter's block caused Herbst to go below the yellow line. The race win was ultimately given to Boyd, while Sauter was demoted to 14th place.

Chastain and Tyler Ankrum left the race below the cutoff point for the playoffs. Due to Boyd's win, none of the other playoffs drivers were locked into the final round.

=== Stage Results ===
Stage One Laps: 20

| Pos | No | Driver | Team | Manufacturer | Points |
|---|---|---|---|---|---|
| 1 | 2 | Sheldon Creed (R) | GMS Racing | Chevrolet | 10 |
| 2 | 24 | Brett Moffitt | GMS Racing | Chevrolet | 9 |
| 3 | 45 | Ross Chastain | Niece Motorsports | Chevrolet | 8 |
| 4 | 8 | John Hunter Nemechek (i) | NEMCO Motorsports | Chevrolet | 0 |
| 5 | 52 | Stewart Friesen | Halmar Friesen Racing | Chevrolet | 6 |
| 6 | 51 | Riley Herbst | Kyle Busch Motorsports | Toyota | 5 |
| 7 | 16 | Austin Hill | Hattori Racing Enterprises | Toyota | 4 |
| 8 | 99 | Ben Rhodes | ThorSport Racing | Ford | 3 |
| 9 | 4 | Todd Gilliland | Kyle Busch Motorsports | Toyota | 2 |
| 10 | 22 | Austin Wayne Self | AM Racing | Chevrolet | 1 |

Stage Two Laps: 20

| Pos | No | Driver | Team | Manufacturer | Points |
|---|---|---|---|---|---|
| 1 | 52 | Stewart Friesen | Halmar Friesen Racing | Chevrolet | 10 |
| 2 | 24 | Brett Moffitt | GMS Racing | Chevrolet | 9 |
| 3 | 22 | Austin Wayne Self | AM Racing | Chevrolet | 8 |
| 4 | 2 | Sheldon Creed (R) | GMS Racing | Chevrolet | 7 |
| 5 | 13 | Johnny Sauter | ThorSport Racing | Ford | 6 |
| 6 | 17 | Tyler Ankrum (R) | DGR-Crosley | Toyota | 5 |
| 7 | 12 | Gus Dean (R) | Young's Motorsports | Chevrolet | 4 |
| 8 | 15 | Anthony Alfredo (R) | DGR-Crosley | Toyota | 3 |
| 9 | 4 | Todd Gilliland | Kyle Busch Motorsports | Toyota | 2 |
| 10 | 88 | Matt Crafton | ThorSport Racing | Ford | 1 |

=== Final Stage Results ===
Stage Three Laps: 54

| Pos | Grid | No | Driver | Team | Manufacturer | Laps | Points |
|---|---|---|---|---|---|---|---|
| 1 | 25 | 20 | Spencer Boyd (R) | Young's Motorsports | Chevrolet | 98 | 40 |
| 2 | 6 | 4 | Todd Gilliland | Kyle Busch Motorsports | Toyota | 98 | 39 |
| 3 | 7 | 51 | Riley Herbst | Kyle Busch Motorsports | Toyota | 98 | 39 |
| 4 | 8 | 24 | Brett Moffitt | GMS Racing | Chevrolet | 98 | 51 |
| 5 | 10 | 52 | Stewart Friesen | Halmar Friesen Racing | Chevrolet | 98 | 48 |
| 6 | 13 | 16 | Austin Hill | Hattori Racing Enterprises | Toyota | 98 | 35 |
| 7 | 2 | 17 | Tyler Ankrum (R) | DGR-Crosley | Toyota | 98 | 35 |
| 8 | 1 | 88 | Matt Crafton | ThorSport Racing | Ford | 98 | 30 |
| 9 | 5 | 2 | Sheldon Creed (R) | GMS Racing | Chevrolet | 98 | 45 |
| 10 | 14 | 98 | Grant Enfinger | ThorSport Racing | Ford | 98 | 27 |
| 11 | 3 | 18 | Harrison Burton (R) | Kyle Busch Motorsports | Toyota | 98 | 26 |
| 12 | 15 | 99 | Ben Rhodes | ThorSport Racing | Ford | 98 | 28 |
| 13 | 9 | 7 | Korbin Forrister | All Out Motorsports | Toyota | 98 | 24 |
| 14 | 4 | 13 | Johnny Sauter | ThorSport Racing | Ford | 98 | 29 |
| 15 | 16 | 15 | Anthony Alfredo (R) | DGR-Crosley | Toyota | 97 | 25 |
| 16 | 19 | 54 | Natalie Decker (R) | DGR-Crosley | Toyota | 97 | 21 |
| 17 | 23 | 28 | Bryan Dauzat | FDNY Racing | Chevrolet | 97 | 20 |
| 18 | 31 | 6 | Norm Benning | Norm Benning Racing | Chevrolet | 96 | 19 |
| 19 | 32 | 34 | Jesse Iwuji | Reaume Brothers Racing | Toyota | 96 | 18 |
| 20 | 20 | 12 | Gus Dean (R) | Young's Motorsports | Chevrolet | 92 | 21 |
| 21 | 30 | 3 | Jordan Anderson | Jordan Anderson Racing | Chevrolet | 90 | 16 |
| 22 | 17 | 45 | Ross Chastain | Niece Motorsports | Chevrolet | 87 | 23 |
| 23 | 22 | 87 | Timothy Peters | NEMCO Motorsports | Chevrolet | 87 | 14 |
| 24 | 11 | 9 | Codie Rohrbaugh | CR7 Motorsports | Chevrolet | 87 | 13 |
| 25 | 24 | 68 | Clay Greenfield | Clay Greenfield Motorsports | Toyota | 87 | 12 |
| 26 | 18 | 30 | Brennan Poole (R) | On Point Motorsports | Toyota | 81 | 11 |
| 27 | 28 | 10 | Jennifer Jo Cobb | Jennifer Jo Cobb Racing | Chevrolet | 79 | 10 |
| 28 | 26 | 44 | Angela Ruch | Niece Motorsports | Chevrolet | 72 | 9 |
| 29 | 12 | 22 | Austin Wayne Self | AM Racing | Chevrolet | 69 | 17 |
| 30 | 27 | 8 | John Hunter Nemechek (i) | NEMCO Motorsports | Chevrolet | 30 | 0 |
| 31 | 21 | 02 | Tyler Dippel (R) | Young's Motorsports | Chevrolet | 29 | 6 |
| 32 | 29 | 33 | Mason Massey | Reaume Brothers Racing | Chevrolet | 8 | 5 |

. – Playoffs driver

| Previous race: 2019 World of Westgate 200 | NASCAR Gander Outdoors Truck Series; 2019 season | Next race: 2019 NASCAR Hall of Fame 200 |
