= Scott Stenzel =

American stock car racing driver (born 1980)

- Born: Scott Alan Stenzel; July 28, 1980 (age 46); Mankato, Minnesota, U.S.

NASCAR FedEx Freight Truck Series career
- 15 races run over 5 years
- 2019 position: 67th
- Best finish: 41st (2014)
- First race: 2012 SFP 250 (Kansas)
- Last race: 2019 SpeedyCash.com 400 (Texas)
Wins	Top tens	Poles
0	0	0
- Statistics up to date as of November 18, 2019.

Scott Alan Stenzel (born July 28, 1980) is an American professional stock car racing driver. He raced in the FASCAR league as a teenager and later raced in the ARCA Re/Max Series, before making his NASCAR debut in 2010. He last competed part-time in the NASCAR Gander Outdoors Truck Series, driving the No. 63 Chevrolet Silverado for Copp Motorsports and the No. 34 Silverado for Reaume Brothers Racing.

== Early life ==
Stenzel was born on July 28, 1980, in Mankato, Minnesota, and lived in Wells, Minnesota, for the first eight years of his life, before moving to Alexandria, Minnesota, when his father transferred positions within the United States Postal Service. Stenzel lived next to a home made race track owned by Ron Fischer and became friends with Ron's son Josh. They raced together in karts, four-wheelers, stock cars and dirt bikes.

Stenzel entered the FASCAR racing series at the age of sixteen. He raced enduro super stocks at weekends at local speedways. These races were 250 laps long and lasted all Sunday afternoon. He raced at I-94 Speedway in Sauk Center, Minnesota, and Fergus Falls Speedway in Fergus Falls, Minnesota. These two tracks were 5/8 mile long and allowed Stenzel to gain 'seat time'.

In 1999, Stenzel sold his racing gear to attend college at North Dakota State University and then transferred to Full Sail Real World Education in Orlando, Florida. After graduation Stenzel opened up a production company in 2003 called Digi Craft. His clients included Universal Orlando Resort, Disney Adventures Magazine, Indianapolis Motor Speedway, National Retail Federation and others.

== ARCA Racing Series ==
Stenzel met Charlie Patterson, owner of Nex-Gen Motorsports and retired owner of Patterson Drive Shafts, at the 2006 Daytona 500. Patterson worked with Stenzel to take his career to the professional level. “My main goal is to find as many young, intelligent drivers, who can get the job done. I believe that Scott has what it takes to make it big in Motorsports. When I look at Scott I see the next Jimmie Johnson, he really is a sponsor’s dream. He really impresses me to see him do such a great job behind the wheel,” Patterson stated.

On December 11–12, 2007, Stenzel attended Finish Line Racing School headed up by Mike Loescher. He graduated the class with flying colors and Loesher approved him ready for ARCA RE/MAX contention.

On December 3, 2007, it was announced that Stenzel would test the No. 75 Bob Schacht Motorsports Chevrolet Monte Carlo in the ARCA Re/Max Series at the Daytona International Speedway on December 14–16, 2007. He posted a speed of 50.599 seconds at 179.105 miles per hour (288.242 km/h) which placed him thirteen out of 64 drivers on the first day of ARCA RE/MAX single car runs. There was a record number of drivers who showed up to this test. Posting a total of 40 laps he was granted permission to participate in all of the 2008 ARCA events and was given his official license.

Stenzel drove a Schacht-prepared car in the December 18–20, 2009 Daytona test for ARCA drivers and teams, and obtained his 2010 license for the entire season.

Stenzel signed up with the reality documentary television series called Yellow Stripes: Making the Driver. He finished filming for the first episodes July 6, 2009, a co-production between Gen2Media and Digi Craft. When Yellow Stripes: Making the Driver agreed to sponsor his car, Scott approached Spraker Racing to finalize the Daytona arrangements. Jeff and his crew prepared Scott’s speedway car, which was purchased from the Wood Brothers and powered by a Roush/Yates motor. On January 22, 2010, Stenzel entered his No. 42 Ford Fusion into the Lucas Oil 200 at Daytona with Jeff Spraker agreeing to sit atop the war wagon as crew chief throughout speed week.

When asked about preparing for the upcoming event, Stenzel commented, “I can’t thank everyone enough for helping out a rookie driver. Jeff Spraker, and his skilled crew, have taken me and this Wood Brothers Ford Fusion on at the last minute. Everything is coming together smoothly with everyone pulling extra duty. Plus, as a team we’ve been able to gel. Spraker’s been to Daytona several times. He knows what it takes to lead and finish up front, but he’s yet to win one. Now, we share the same goal – to win at Daytona.”

On April 23, 2010, Spraker agreed to field the car for Stenzel. Stenzel qualified 28th at Talladega Superspeedway. After 250 miles were completed in the race, he finished in the seventh place position. He received the CGS Hard Charger award for passing the most cars during the race.

On January 11–12, 2011 Stenzel partnered up with Spraker Racing again to revisit Daytona International Speedway. During the last single car test session, Stenzel was the fastest Ford in sixth position with a time of 49.457 and a speed of 181.976 miles per hour (292.862 km/h).

== NASCAR ==
On September 17, 2010, Stenzel made his NASCAR debut by driving the No. 37 Spraker Racing Chevrolet and qualifying into the NASCAR K&N Pro Series East's New Hampshire 125. He started the race in 26th place and finished 21st place.

In 2012, Stenzel made his NASCAR Camping World Truck Series debut at Kansas Speedway, where he finished 23rd.

In 2019, Stenzel returned to the Truck Series for the SpeedyCash.com 400 at Texas, driving the No. 34 for Reaume Brothers Racing.

== Motorsports career results ==
=== NASCAR ===
(key) (Bold – Pole position awarded by qualifying time. Italics – Pole position earned by points standings or practice time. * – Most laps led.)

==== Gander Outdoors Truck Series ====
NASCAR Gander Outdoors Truck Series results
Year	Team	No.	Make	1	2	3	4	5	6	7	8	9	10	11	12	13	14	15	16	17	18	19	20	21	22	23	NGOTC	Pts	Ref
2012	MB Motorsports	65	Chevy	DAY	MAR	CAR	KAN; 24	CLT	DOV	TEX; 24	KEN	IOW	CHI	POC	MCH	BRI	ATL	IOW	KEN	LVS	TAL	MAR	TEX	PHO	HOM		57th	41	
2013	MB Motorsports	63	Ford	DAY; DNQ	MAR	CAR	KAN	CLT	DOV	TEX	KEN	IOW	ELD	POC	MCH	BRI	MSP	IOW	CHI	LVS	TAL; 25	MAR	TEX	PHO	HOM		66th	19	
2014	MB Motorsports	36	Chevy	DAY	MAR	KAN; 31	CLT	DOV	TEX									CHI; 29	NHA	LVS; 28					HOM; 33		41st	100	
2014	MB Motorsports	36	Ram							GTW; 28	KEN	IOW	ELD	POC	MCH	BRI											41st	100	
2014	MB Motorsports	63	Chevy														MSP; 24				TAL; 22	MAR	TEX	PHO			41st	100	
2018	Copp Motorsports	83	Chevy	DAY; 15	ATL; 32																						60th	32	
2018	Copp Motorsports	63	Chevy			LVS; 32	MAR	DOV	KAN	CLT	TEX	IOW	GTW	CHI	KEN	ELD	POC	MCH	BRI	MSP	LVS	TAL	MAR	TEX	PHO	HOM	60th	32	
2019	Copp Motorsports	63	Chevy	DAY	ATL	LVS; 32	MAR	TEX	DOV	KAN	CLT																67th	26	
2019	Reaume Brothers Racing	34	Chevy									TEX; 16	IOW	GTW	CHI	KEN	POC	ELD	MCH	BRI	MSP	LVS	TAL	MAR	PHO	HOM	67th	26	

==== K&N Pro Series East ====
NASCAR K&N Pro Series East results
Year	Team	No.	Make	1	2	3	4	5	6	7	8	9	10	NKNPSEC	Pts	Ref
2010	Spraker Racing	37	Chevy	GRE	SBO	IOW	MAR	NHA	LRP	LEE	JFC	NHA; 21	DOV	59th	100	

=== ARCA Racing Series ===
(key) (Bold – Pole position awarded by qualifying time. Italics – Pole position earned by points standings or practice time. * – Most laps led.)

ARCA Racing Series results
Year	Team	No.	Make	1	2	3	4	5	6	7	8	9	10	11	12	13	14	15	16	17	18	19	20	ARSC	Pts	Ref
2010	Spraker Racing	42	Ford	DAY	PBE	SLM	TEX	TAL; 7	TOL	POC	MCH	IOW	MFD	POC	BLN	NJE	ISF	CHI	DSF	TOL	SLM	KAN	CAR	82nd	220	
2011	Spraker Racing	42	Ford	DAY; 23	TAL	SLM	TOL	NJE	CHI	POC	MCH	WIN	BLN	IOW	IRP	POC	ISF	MAD	DSF	SLM	KAN	TOL		134th	115	

^{*} Season still in progress
^{1} Ineligible for series points
