= Austin Wayne Self =

American racing driver (born 1996)

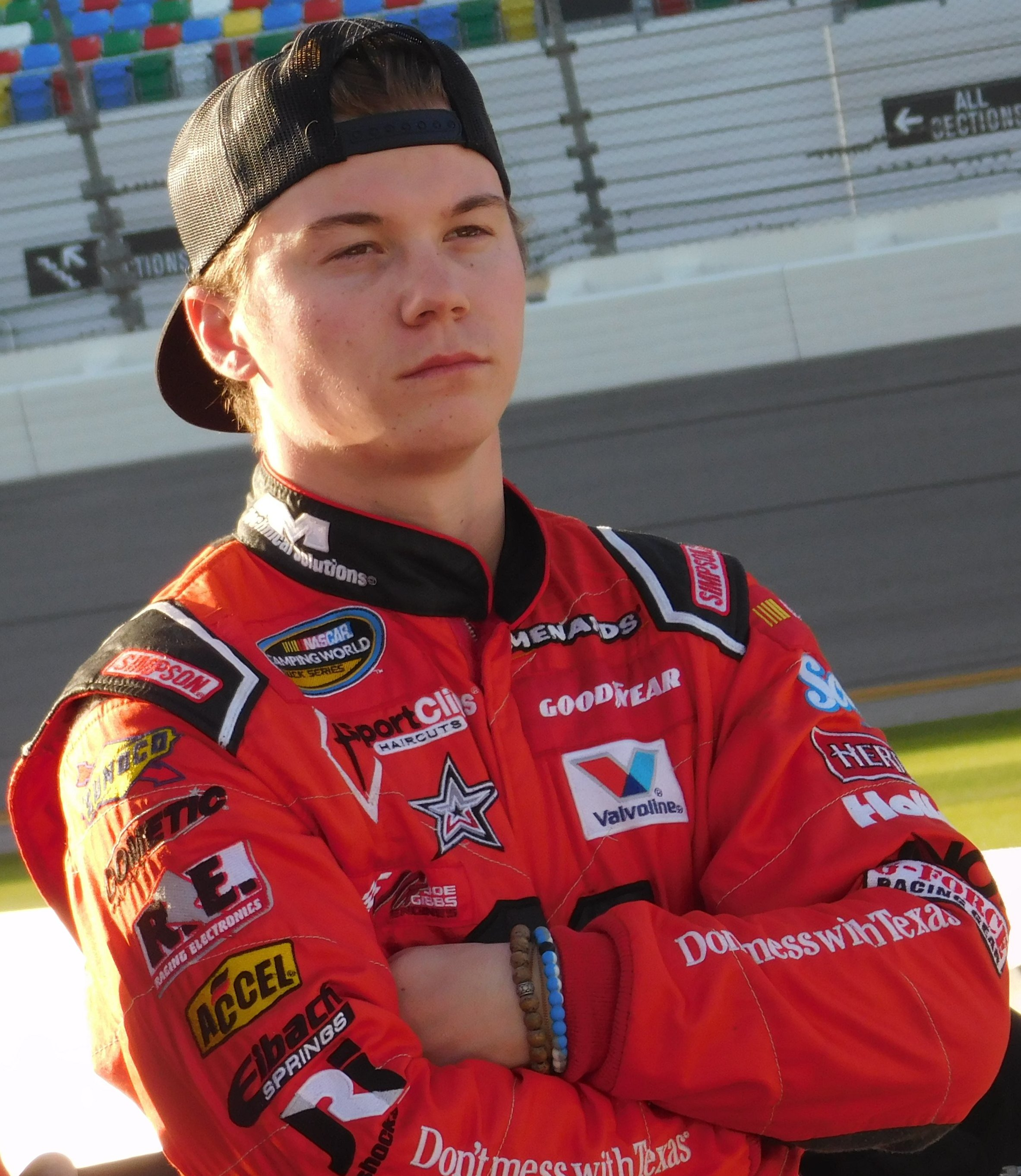
- Self at Daytona International Speedway in 2017
- Born: March 5, 1996 (age 30); Austin, Texas, U.S.

NASCAR FedEx Freight Truck Series career
- 147 races run over 8 years
- 2023 position: 70th
- Best finish: 12th (2018)
- First race: 2016 NextEra Energy Resources 250 (Daytona)
- Last race: 2023 O'Reilly Auto Parts 150 (Mid-Ohio)
Wins	Top tens	Poles
0	15	0
- Statistics up to date as of November 5, 2023.

Austin Wayne Self (born March 5, 1996) is an American professional stock car racing driver. He last competed part-time in the NASCAR Craftsman Truck Series, driving the No. 22 Ford F-150 for his family team, AM Racing. He has also competed in the ARCA Menards Series, previously driving full-time in it for two years before moving up to the Truck Series, although he has continued to drive in the series part-time, most recently in 2022, where he drove the No. 32 Chevrolet for AM Racing.

== Racing career ==
=== ARCA Menards Series ===
Self scored his first win at Winchester Speedway in June 2015, finishing second in the standings for that same year. As a career, Self totaled 45 starts for two teams.

=== Camping World Truck Series ===
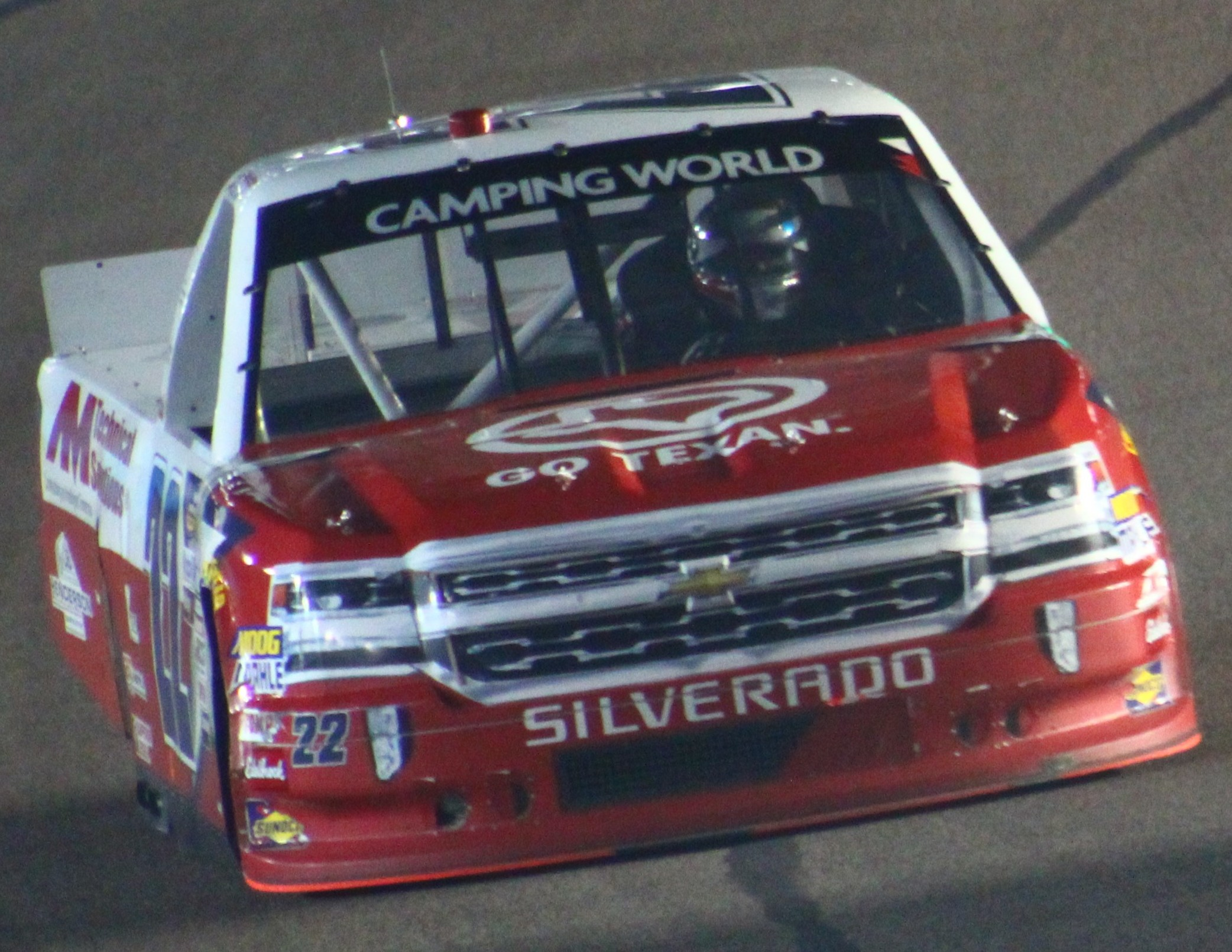
Self in the No. 22 at ISM Raceway in 2018

In December 2015, it was announced that Self would compete for Rookie of the Year honors and run the entire schedule with AM Racing, driving the No. 22 Toyota Tundra owned by his father Tim Self. After failing to qualify for the third race of the season at Martinsville, Self took the place of Tommy Joe Martins, who damaged his truck in qualifying and was not able to race. Ironically, he recorded his highest Camping World Truck Series finish at that time, finishing 15th.

In his rookie season of 2016, Self was penalized two times in the first three races. After the first race at Daytona, he was given a warning for an illegal triangular filler panel. After the third race at Martinsville, he was given a warning for trailing arm infractions.

After his family team merged with Win-Tron Racing, Self began driving trucks out of the Win-Tron shop in Mooresville, NC beginning with the thirteenth race of the season at Bristol.

Self started the 2017 season on a high note when he finished second at Daytona. However, AM Racing did not enter the following week's race at Atlanta as they planned to focus on building the team. In May, Self joined Niece Motorsports and the No. 45 Chevrolet at Kansas. At Pocono, Self joined Martins Motorsports and drove the No. 44 truck to a 16th-place finish. Self continued to drive primarily for Martins, returning to AM Racing for Canadian Tire Motorsport Park and Niece for Talladega Superspeedway.

On October 30, 2017, it was announced that Self joined Niece Motorsports for the entirety of the 2018 NASCAR Camping World Truck Series season.

Following the Homestead race, AM Racing and Niece Motorsports parted ways allowing AM Racing to field full-time for Self in 2019.

After running the first three races of the year and missing the next two, Self was indefinitely suspended by NASCAR on April 1, 2019, after the fifth event of the season. Self was suspended for violating the sanctioning body's substance abuse policy. After completing NASCAR's "Road to Recovery" rehab program, Self was reinstated on April 30.

=== Xfinity Series ===
In May 2017, Self joined MBM Motorsports for his Xfinity Series debut at Charlotte Motor Speedway. However, as the team withdrew at Cup, owner Carl Long took over the No. 40 ride for the race, delaying Self's debut. On August 15, 2022, it was announced that Self would drive a second entry for Jordan Anderson Racing at Watkins Glen International.

== Personal life ==
He is a native of Austin, Texas. Self is also the brother-in-law of NASCAR team owner/part-time driver Jordan Anderson.

On January 31, 2016, Self was charged with simple physical assault and underage alcohol consumption for an incident in July 2015.

== Motorsports career results ==
=== NASCAR ===
(key) (Bold – Pole position awarded by qualifying time. Italics – Pole position earned by points standings or practice time. * – Most laps led.)

==== Xfinity Series ====
NASCAR Xfinity Series results
Year	Team	No.	Make	1	2	3	4	5	6	7	8	9	10	11	12	13	14	15	16	17	18	19	20	21	22	23	24	25	26	27	28	29	30	31	32	33	NXSC	Pts	Ref
2022	Jordan Anderson Racing	32	Chevy	DAY	CAL	LVS	PHO	ATL	COA	RCH	MAR	TAL	DOV	DAR	TEX	CLT	PIR	NSH	ROA	ATL	NHA	POC	IND	MCH	GLN; DNQ	DAY	DAR	KAN	BRI	TEX	TAL	ROV; DNQ	LVS	HOM	MAR	PHO	108th	0^{1}	

==== Craftsman Truck Series ====
NASCAR Craftsman Truck Series results
Year	Team	No.	Make	1	2	3	4	5	6	7	8	9	10	11	12	13	14	15	16	17	18	19	20	21	22	23	NCTC	Pts	Ref
2016	AM Racing	22	Toyota	DAY; 19	ATL; 16	MAR; DNQ	KAN; 25	DOV; 32	CLT; 21	TEX; 13	IOW; 16	GTW; 28	KEN; 27	ELD; 9	POC; 25	BRI; 21	MCH; 16	MSP; 15	CHI; 17	NHA; 29	LVS; 21	TAL; 14	MAR	TEX; 22		HOM; 25	15th	279	
2016	AM Racing	44	Toyota			MAR; 15																					15th	279	
2016	AM Racing	66	Toyota																						PHO; 22		15th	279	
2017	AM Racing	32	Toyota	DAY; 2	ATL																						15th	364	
2017	AM Racing	22	Toyota			MAR; DNQ		CLT; 12	DOV	TEX; 12	GTW		KEN; 22	ELD				MSP; 9									15th	364	
2017	Niece Motorsports	45	Chevy				KAN; 15																	TEX; 15			15th	364	
2017	Niece Motorsports	45	Toyota									IOW; 23										TAL; 18					15th	364	
2017	Martins Motorsports	44	Chevy												POC; 16	MCH; 15	BRI; 24		CHI; 20	NHA; 14	LVS; 20		MAR; 29		PHO; 25	HOM; 17	15th	364	
2018	Niece Motorsports	22	Chevy	DAY; 20	ATL; 15	LVS; 16	MAR; 27	DOV; 15	KAN; 13	CLT; 27	TEX; 17	IOW; 15	GTW; 16	CHI; 13	KEN; 14	ELD; 18	POC; 18	MCH; 11	BRI; 13	MSP; 21	LVS; 9	TAL; 12	MAR; 23	TEX; 16	PHO; 19	HOM; 23	12th	480	
2019	AM Racing	22	Chevy	DAY; 9	ATL; 27	LVS; 15	MAR	TEX	DOV; 19	KAN; 27	CLT; 21	TEX; 19	IOW; 14	GTW; 17	CHI; 25	KEN; 6	POC; 15	ELD; 13	MCH; 5	BRI; 15	MSP; 14	LVS; 17	TAL; 29	MAR; 19	PHO; 18	HOM; 19	14th	442	
2020	AM Racing	22	Chevy	DAY; 31	LVS; 17	CLT; 19	ATL; 30	HOM; 16	POC; 38	KEN; 20	TEX; 14	KAN; 17	KAN; 13	MCH; 37	DRC; 11	DOV; 23	GTW; 30	DAR; 17	RCH; 14	BRI; 33	LVS; 24	TAL; 20	KAN; 19	TEX; 7	MAR; 9	PHO; 20	16th	386	
2021	AM Racing	22	Chevy	DAY; 21	DRC; 15	LVS; 14	ATL; 23	BRD; 10	RCH; 19	KAN; 16	DAR; 9	COA; 16	CLT; 17	TEX; 15	NSH; 27	POC; 19	KNX; 30	GLN; 16	GTW; 9	DAR; 14	BRI; 14	LVS; 8	TAL; 29	MAR; 20	PHO; 26		14th	447	
2022	AM Racing	22	Chevy	DAY; 13	LVS; 9	ATL; 10	COA; 27	MAR; 31	BRD; 36	DAR; 27	KAN; 23	TEX; 18	CLT; 25	GTW; 26	SON; Wth	KNO	NSH	MOH; 14	POC	IRP; 19	RCH; 27	KAN	BRI; 20	TAL; 30	HOM	PHO; 24	25th	261	
2023	AM Racing	22	Ford	DAY	LVS	ATL	COA	TEX	BRD	MAR	KAN	DAR	NWS	CHA	GTW	NSH	MOH; 30	POC	RCH	IRP	MLW	KAN	BRI	TAL	HOM	PHO	70th	10	

==== K&N Pro Series East ====
NASCAR K&N Pro Series East results
Year	Team	No.	Make	1	2	3	4	5	6	7	8	9	10	11	12	13	14	NKNPSEC	Pts	Ref
2013	Cunningham Motorsports	77	Dodge	BRI; 12	GRE	FIF	RCH; 9	BGS	IOW	LGY	COL	IOW	VIR	GRE	NHA; 19	DOV; DNQ	RAL	29th	104	

==== K&N Pro Series West ====
NASCAR K&N Pro Series West results
Year	Team	No.	Make	1	2	3	4	5	6	7	8	9	10	11	12	13	14	15	NKNPSWC	Pts	Ref
2013	Cunningham Motorsports	77	Dodge	PHO	S99	BIR	IOW	L44	SON	CNS	IOW	EVG	SPO	MMP	SMP	AAS	KCR	PHO; 13	59th	31	

^{*} Season still in progress
^{1} Ineligible for series points

=== ARCA Menards Series ===
(key) (Bold – Pole position awarded by qualifying time. Italics – Pole position earned by points standings or practice time. * – Most laps led.)

ARCA Menards Series results
Year	Team	No.	Make	1	2	3	4	5	6	7	8	9	10	11	12	13	14	15	16	17	18	19	20	21	AMSC	Pts	Ref
2013	Cunningham Motorsports	22	Dodge	DAY	MOB	SLM	TAL	TOL; 6	ELK	POC	MCH	ROA	WIN; 2	CHI	NJE; 10	POC	BLN; 4	ISF	MAD	DSF	IOW; 15	SLM; 10	KEN	KAN	24th	1160	
2014	Cunningham Motorsports	72	Dodge	DAY; DNQ																					6th	4415	
2014	Cunningham Motorsports	22	Dodge		MOB; 12	SLM; 4	TAL; 3	TOL; 8	NJE; 24	POC; 24	MCH; 9	ELK; 8	WIN; 10	CHI; 20	IRP; 2	POC; 8	BLN; 2	ISF; 10	MAD; 8	DSF; 10	SLM; 3	KEN; 12	KAN; 22		6th	4415	
2015	Mason Mitchell Motorsports	98	Ford	DAY; 15	**MOB**; 4	NSH; 3	**SLM**; 5	TAL; 32	TOL; 6	NJE; 7	POC; 15			WIN; 1		IRP; 9	POC; 7	BLN; 5		DSF; 15	SLM; 16				2nd	4660	
2015	Mason Mitchell Motorsports	98	Chevy									MCH; 3	CHI; 12		IOW; 6				ISF; 10			KEN; 11	KAN; 12		2nd	4660	
2016	Win-Tron Racing	33	Toyota	DAY; 36	NSH	SLM	TAL	TOL	NJE	POC	MCH	MAD	WIN	IOW	IRP	POC	BLN	ISF	DSF	SLM	CHI	KEN	KAN		133rd	50	
2017	Win-Tron Racing	33	Toyota	DAY	NSH	SLM	TAL	TOL	ELK	POC	MCH	MAD	IOW	IRP	POC	WIN	ISF	ROA; 6	DSF	SLM	CHI	KEN	KAN		81st	200	
2019	Win-Tron Racing	32	Chevy	DAY	FIF	SLM	TAL	NSH	TOL	CLT	POC	MCH	MAD	GTW	CHI; 8	ELK	IOW	POC; 6	ISF	DSF	SLM	IRP	KAN		45th	395	
2021	AM Racing	32	Chevy	DAY	PHO	TAL	KAN	TOL	CLT	MOH	POC	ELK	BLN	IOW	WIN	GLN; 9	MCH	ISF	MLW	DSF	BRI	SLM	KAN		82nd	35	
2022	AM Racing	32	Chevy	DAY	PHO	TAL	KAN	CLT	IOW	BLN	ELK	MOH	POC	IRP	MCH	GLN; 7	ISF	MLW	DSF	KAN	BRI	SLM	TOL		77th	37	
