= Angela Ruch =

American racing driver (born 1983)

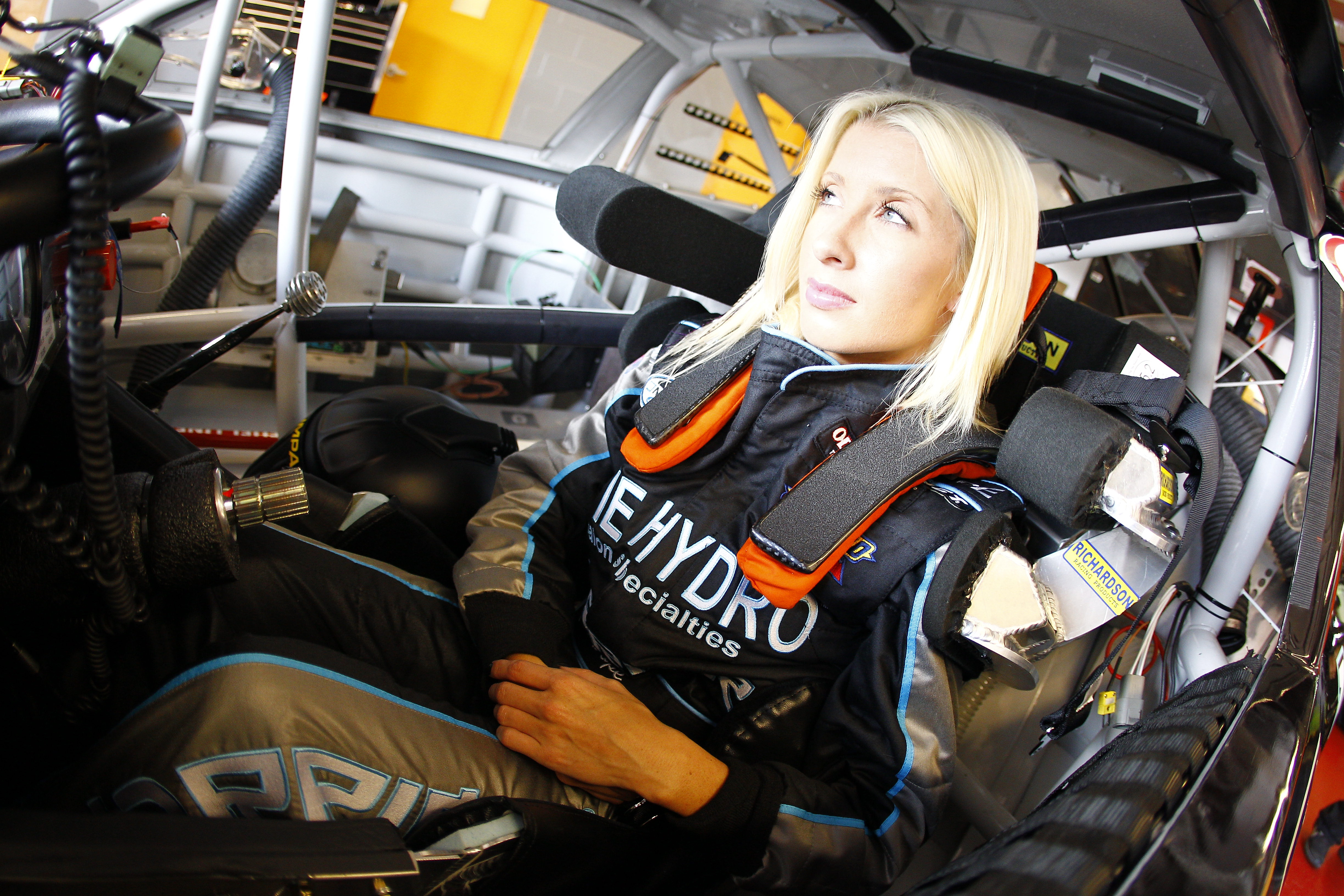
- Ruch in 2011
- Born: Angela Christine Cope; August 18, 1983 (age 43); Puyallup, Washington, U.S.
- Height: 5 ft 3 in (1.60 m)
- Weight: 100 lb (45 kg)
- Achievements: 1995 Tri-Cities Gold Cup Yamaha Class champion 1998 PSGKA Gold Cup Junior Piston Port winner 2002 Lucas Oil Can-Am 150 (Sun Valley Speedway) winner

NASCAR O'Reilly Auto Parts Series career
- 14 races run over 4 years
- 2018 position: 68th
- Best finish: 55th (2011)
- First race: 2011 Iowa John Deere Dealers 250 (Iowa)
- Last race: 2018 Ford EcoBoost 300 (Homestead)
Wins	Top tens	Poles
0	0	0

NASCAR FedEx Freight Truck Series career
- 18 races run over 3 years
- 2020 position: 42nd
- Best finish: 31st (2019)
- First race: 2010 Kroger 200 (Martinsville)
- Last race: 2020 Vankor 350 (Texas)
Wins	Top tens	Poles
0	1	0
- Statistics up to date as of November 11, 2020.

Angela Christine Ruch (/rək/RUHK, née Cope, born August 18, 1983) is an American professional stock car racing driver. She is the niece of Derrike Cope and the sister of Amber Cope. She last competed in the NASCAR Gander RV & Outdoors Truck Series, driving the No. 00 Chevrolet Silverado/Toyota Tundra for Reaume Brothers Racing.

== Racing career ==
Angela and Amber Cope became the third generation of Copes to enter into the world of racing. They started racing go-karts in the Greater Puget Sound area after their parents gave them a go-kart for Christmas at age 9. In their seven years of driving go-karts in the Pacific Northwest, Angela and her sister earned 50 wins and 20 pole positions combined. Angela also set new track records at five of six tracks in the same region.

At age 15, both Angela and Amber progressed to racing late models. In 2000, they were featured on The Early Show with host Bryant Gumbel during their career in late models.

As Angela and Amber became more experienced behind the wheel, they knew that in order to advance their careers and have the chance at driving in NASCAR, they would have to leave Washington, so they moved across the country to the Charlotte metropolitan area, where most of the race teams are located. Putting their focus into learning the in and outs of professional racing, the twins traveled with their uncle Derrike to every Cup race that he was competing in.

In 2006, the twins split seat time in the ARCA Re/Max Series at Berlin, Gateway, Chicagoland, Milwaukee and Toledo. Angela's starts were at Berlin in the No. 1 for Andy Belmont and Milwaukee in the No. 72 for Mario Gosselin. After not making any ARCA starts in 2007, Angela returned for one race in the series in 2008 at Kentucky Speedway. Driving the No. 68 Dodge for Rick Markle, she qualified eighth and finished 29th. Amber was also in this race, qualifying fifteenth and finishing 38th in the No. 70 car for her uncle's team.

In 2011, Angela competed in four Nationwide Series races. In 2012, she was announced to share the No. 24 SR2 Motorsports Toyota in the series with her twin sister and Benny Gordon on a part-time schedule.

Five years later, she made her return to NASCAR's Xfinity Series at Kentucky Speedway, now going by Angela Ruch after getting married during her time without a ride. She drove the No. 78 B. J. McLeod Motorsports Chevrolet.

In 2019, Ruch returned to the Gander Outdoors Truck Series with NEMCO Motorsports. She finished a NASCAR career-best eighth at Daytona, her first lead lap finish and the second-highest ever for a female in the Truck Series. In March, Ruch and Niece Motorsports announced she would be tapped to race 12 events in the Gander Outdoors Truck Series starting at Texas Motor Speedway.

It was announced on January 29, 2020 that Ruch would run a full-time Truck schedule in 2020, driving the No. 00 Chevrolet/Toyota for Reaume Brothers Racing with an alliance with Niece Motorsports, who she drove for in 2019. After running the first five races, Ruch missed the Pocono Raceway event due to sponsorship issues and was replaced by team owner Josh Reaume in the No. 00.

== Motorsports career results ==
=== NASCAR ===
(key) (Bold – Pole position awarded by qualifying time. Italics – Pole position earned by points standings or practice time. * – Most laps led.)

==== Xfinity Series ====
NASCAR Xfinity Series results
Year	Team	No.	Make	1	2	3	4	5	6	7	8	9	10	11	12	13	14	15	16	17	18	19	20	21	22	23	24	25	26	27	28	29	30	31	32	33	34	NXSC	Pts	Ref
2011	TriStar Motorsports	44	Chevy	DAY	PHO	LVS	BRI	CAL	TEX	TAL	NSH	RCH	DAR	DOV	IOW; 28	CLT	CHI	MCH	ROA	DAY	KEN	NHA; 25	NSH	IRP	IOW	GLN	CGV	BRI	ATL	RCH	CHI; DNQ	DOV						55th	56	
2011	TriStar Motorsports	23	Chevy																														KAN; 32					55th	56	
2011	TriStar Motorsports	70	Chevy																															CLT; 35	TEX	PHO	HOM	55th	56	
2012	SR² Motorsports	00	Chevy	DAY	PHO	LVS	BRI	CAL	TEX	RCH	TAL	DAR	IOW	CLT; 36	DOV																							76th	25	
2012	SR² Motorsports	24	Chevy													MCH; 28	ROA	KEN	DAY	NHA	CHI	IND	IOW	GLN	CGV	BRI	ATL	RCH	CHI	KEN	DOV							76th	25	
2012	SR² Motorsports	00	Toyota																													CLT; 43	KAN	TEX	PHO	HOM		76th	25	
2017	B. J. McLeod Motorsports	78	Chevy	DAY	ATL	LVS	PHO	CAL	TEX	BRI	RCH	TAL	CLT	DOV	POC	MCH	IOW	DAY	KEN; 30	NHA	IND	IOW	GLN	MOH	BRI	ROA	DAR	RCH	CHI	KEN; 32	DOV	CLT; 35	KAN	TEX; 38	PHO	HOM		66th	14	
2018	B. J. McLeod Motorsports	8	Chevy	DAY	ATL	LVS	PHO	CAL	TEX	BRI	RCH	TAL	DOV	CLT	POC	MCH	IOW	CHI	DAY	KEN	NHA; 30	IOW	GLN	MOH	BRI	ROA	DAR	IND	LVS	RCH	CLT	DOV						68th	16	
2018	B. J. McLeod Motorsports	38	Chevy																														KAN; 29	TEX	PHO			68th	16	
2018	RSS Racing	39	Chevy																																	HOM; 37		68th	16	

==== Gander RV & Outdoors Truck Series ====
NASCAR Gander RV & Outdoors Truck Series results
Year	Team	No.	Make	1	2	3	4	5	6	7	8	9	10	11	12	13	14	15	16	17	18	19	20	21	22	23	24	25	NGTC	Pts	Ref
2010	Daisy Ramirez Motorsports	01	Dodge	DAY	ATL	MAR	NSH	KAN	DOV	CLT	TEX	MCH	IOW	GTY	IRP	POC	NSH	DAR	BRI	CHI	KEN	NHA	LVS	MAR; 30	TAL	TEX	PHO	HOM	111th	73	
2019	NEMCO Motorsports	8	Chevy	DAY; 8	ATL	LVS; 16	MAR																						31st	139	
2019	Niece Motorsports	44	Chevy					TEX; 30	DOV	KAN; 16	CLT; 23	TEX; 29	IOW	GTW	CHI	KEN	POC	ELD	MCH	BRI; 30	MSP	LVS; 22	TAL; 28	MAR	PHO	HOM; 29			31st	139	
2020	Reaume Brothers Racing	00	Chevy	DAY; 28																									42nd	84	
2020	Reaume Brothers Racing	00	Toyota		LVS; 24	CLT; 23	ATL; 28	HOM; 24	POC	KEN; 25	TEX; 23	KAN	KAN	MCH	DAY	DOV	GTW	DAR	RCH	BRI	LVS	TAL	KAN	TEX	MAR	PHO			42nd	84	

=== ARCA Re/Max Series ===
(key) (Bold – Pole position awarded by qualifying time. Italics – Pole position earned by points standings or practice time. * – Most laps led.)

ARCA Re/Max Series results
Year	Team	No.	Make	1	2	3	4	5	6	7	8	9	10	11	12	13	14	15	16	17	18	19	20	21	22	23	ARMC	Pts	Ref
2006	Andy Belmont Racing	1	Ford	DAY	NSH	SLM	WIN	KEN	TOL	POC	MCH	KAN	KEN	BLN; 22	POC	GTW	NSH	MCH	ISF								110th	190	
2006	DGM Racing	72	Chevy																	MIL; 32	TOL	DSF	CHI	SLM	TAL	IOW	110th	190	
2008	Rick Markle Racing	68	Dodge	DAY	SLM	IOW	KAN	CAR	KEN	TOL	POC	MCH	CAY	KEN; 29	BLN	POC	NSH	ISF	DSF	CHI	SLM	NJE	TAL	TOL			136th	85	

^{*} Season still in progress
^{1} Ineligible for series points
