= 2018 Buckle Up in Your Truck 225 =

Race details
- Race 12 of 23 of the 2018 NASCAR Camping World Truck Series
- Date: July 12, 2018
- Official name: 8th Annual Buckle Up in Your Truck 225
- Location: Sparta, Kentucky, Kentucky Speedway
- Course: Permanent racing facility
- Course length: 1.5 miles (2.41 km)
- Distance: 150 laps, 225 mi (362.102 km)
- Scheduled distance: 150 laps, 225 mi (362.102 km)
- Average speed: 146.739 miles per hour (236.154 km/h)

Pole position
Driver	Noah Gragson	Kyle Busch Motorsports
- Time: 29.355

Most laps led
Driver	Noah Gragson	Kyle Busch Motorsports
- Laps: 62

Winner
No. 41	Ben Rhodes	ThorSport Racing

Television in the United States
- Network: Fox Sports 1
- Announcers: Vince Welch, Michael Waltrip, Kevin Harvick

Radio in the United States
- Radio: Motor Racing Network

The 2018 Buckle Up in Your Truck 225 was the 12th stock car race of the 2018 NASCAR Camping World Truck Series season and the eighth iteration of the event. The race was held on Thursday, July 12, 2018, in Sparta, Kentucky, at Kentucky Speedway, a 1.5-mile (2.41 km) tri-oval speedway. The race took the scheduled 150 laps to complete. At race's end, Ben Rhodes of ThorSport Racing would win after not pitting for tires on the final round of pit stops, earning his second career NASCAR Camping World Truck Series win and his first and only of the season. To fill out the podium, Stewart Friesen of Halmar Friesen Racing and Matt Crafton of ThorSport Racing would finish second and third, respectively.

== Background ==
The layout of Kentucky Speedway. the venue where the race was held.

Kentucky Speedway is a 1.5-mile (2.4 km) tri-oval speedway in Sparta, Kentucky, which has hosted ARCA, NASCAR and Indy Racing League racing annually since it opened in 2000. The track is currently owned and operated by Speedway Motorsports, Inc. and Jerry Carroll, who, along with four other investors, owned Kentucky Speedway until 2008. The speedway has a grandstand capacity of 117,000. Construction of the speedway began in 1998 and was completed in mid-2000. The speedway has hosted the Gander RV & Outdoors Truck Series, Xfinity Series, IndyCar Series, Indy Lights, and most recently, the NASCAR Cup Series beginning in 2011.

=== Entry list ===
#	Driver	Team	Make	Sponsor
0	Camden Murphy	Jennifer Jo Cobb Racing	Chevrolet	Jennifer Jo Cobb Racing
2	Cody Coughlin	GMS Racing	Chevrolet	Jegs
02	Austin Hill	Young's Motorsports	Chevrolet	Whitetail Heaven Outfitters
3	Jordan Anderson	Jordan Anderson Racing	Chevrolet	Lucas Oil, Bommarito Automotive Group
4	Todd Gilliland	Kyle Busch Motorsports	Toyota	Mobil 1
6	Norm Benning	Norm Benning Racing	Chevrolet	Zomongo
7	Korbin Forrister	All Out Motorsports	Toyota	N. O. W. Matters More
8	John Hunter Nemechek	NEMCO Motorsports	Chevrolet	D. A. B. Constructors, Inc.
10	Jennifer Jo Cobb	Jennifer Jo Cobb Racing	Chevrolet	Driven2Honor.org
13	Myatt Snider	ThorSport Racing	Ford	Louisiana Hot Sauce, The Carolina Nut Company
15	Robby Lyons	Premium Motorsports	Chevrolet	Sunwest Construction
16	Brett Moffitt	Hattori Racing Enterprises	Toyota	Aisin
17	Chris Eggleston	DGR-Crosley	Toyota	BlazeMaster Fire Protection Systems
18	Noah Gragson	Kyle Busch Motorsports	Toyota	Safelite Auto Glass
20	Tate Fogleman	Young's Motorsports	Chevrolet	Randco, Young's Building Systems
21	Johnny Sauter	GMS Racing	Chevrolet	ISM Connect
22	Austin Wayne Self	Niece Motorsports	Chevrolet	AM Technical Solutions, GO TEXAN.
24	Justin Haley	GMS Racing	Chevrolet	Fraternal Order of Eagles
25	Dalton Sargeant	GMS Racing	Chevrolet	Performance Plus Motor Oil
33	Josh Reaume	Reaume Brothers Racing	Chevrolet	Colonial Countertops
41	Ben Rhodes	ThorSport Racing	Ford	The Carolina Nut Company
45	Justin Fontaine	Niece Motorsports	Chevrolet	ProMatic Automation
49	Wendell Chavous	Premium Motorsports	Chevrolet	SobrietyNation.org
50	Timmy Hill	Beaver Motorsports	Chevrolet	Beaver Motorsports
51	Brandon Jones	Kyle Busch Motorsports	Toyota	Soleus Air
52	Stewart Friesen	Halmar Friesen Racing	Chevrolet	Halmar "We Build America"
54	Bo LeMastus	DGR-Crosley	Toyota	Crosley Brands
63	Bayley Currey	MB Motorsports	Chevrolet	MB Motorsports
68	Clay Greenfield	Clay Greenfield Motorsports	Chevrolet	AMVETS #PLEASESTAND
75	Parker Kligerman	Henderson Motorsports	Chevrolet	Food Country USA, Tide Pods
83	Tyler Matthews	Copp Motorsports	Chevrolet	Accent Imaging, Cane River Brewing Company
87	Joe Nemechek	NEMCO Motorsports	Chevrolet	Petron Plus
88	Matt Crafton	ThorSport Racing	Ford	Menards, Great Lakes Flooring
98	Grant Enfinger	ThorSport Racing	Ford	Curb Records
Official entry list

== Practice ==
=== First practice ===
The first practice session would occur on Thursday, July 12, at 9:05 AM EST and would last for 50 minutes. Justin Haley of GMS Racing would set the fastest time in the session, with a lap of 29.658 and an average speed of 182.076 miles per hour (293.023 km/h).

Pos.	#	Driver	Team	Make	Time	Speed
1	24	Justin Haley	GMS Racing	Chevrolet	29.658	182.076
2	52	Stewart Friesen	Halmar Friesen Racing	Chevrolet	29.705	181.788
3	13	Myatt Snider	ThorSport Racing	Ford	29.733	181.616
Full first practice results

=== Second practice ===
The second and final practice session, sometimes known as Happy Hour, would occur on Thursday, July 12, at 11:05 AM EST and would last for 50 minutes. Ben Rhodes of ThorSport Racing would set the fastest time in the session, with a lap of 29.535 and an average speed of 182.834 miles per hour (294.243 km/h).

Pos.	#	Driver	Team	Make	Time	Speed
1	41	Ben Rhodes	ThorSport Racing	Ford	29.535	182.834
2	98	Grant Enfinger	ThorSport Racing	Ford	29.686	181.904
3	17	Chris Eggleston	DGR-Crosley	Toyota	29.732	181.622
Full Happy Hour practice results

== Qualifying ==
Qualifying would occur on Thursday, July 12, at 5:10 PM EST. Since Kentucky Speedway is at least a 1.5 miles (2.4 km) racetrack, the qualifying system was a single car, single lap, two round system where in the first round, everyone would set a time to determine positions 13–32. Then, the fastest 12 qualifiers would move on to the second round to determine positions 1–12.

Noah Gragson of Kyle Busch Motorsports would win the pole, setting a lap of 29.355 and an average speed of 183.955 miles per hour (296.047 km/h) in the second round.

Myatt Snider would crash on his first lap, hitting the turn 4 wall. He would not make a lap, but would still qualify by owner's points.

Two drivers would fail to qualify: Joe Nemechek and Timmy Hill.

=== Full qualifying results ===
Pos.	#	Driver	Team	Make	Time (R1)	Speed (R1)	Time (R2)	Speed (R2)
1	18	Noah Gragson	Kyle Busch Motorsports	Toyota	29.403	183.655	29.355	183.955
2	4	Todd Gilliland	Kyle Busch Motorsports	Toyota	29.664	182.039	29.474	183.212
3	41	Ben Rhodes	ThorSport Racing	Ford	29.619	182.315	29.476	183.200
4	17	Chris Eggleston	DGR-Crosley	Toyota	29.581	182.550	29.522	182.914
5	98	Grant Enfinger	ThorSport Racing	Ford	29.832	181.014	29.578	182.568
6	51	Brandon Jones	Kyle Busch Motorsports	Toyota	29.668	182.014	29.636	182.211
7	21	Johnny Sauter	GMS Racing	Chevrolet	29.824	181.062	29.667	182.020
8	75	Parker Kligerman	Henderson Motorsports	Chevrolet	29.709	181.763	29.707	181.775
9	25	Dalton Sargeant	GMS Racing	Chevrolet	29.746	181.537	29.719	181.702
10	24	Justin Haley	GMS Racing	Chevrolet	29.854	180.880	29.797	181.226
11	2	Cody Coughlin	GMS Racing	Chevrolet	29.841	180.959	29.941	180.355
12	02	Austin Hill	Young's Motorsports	Chevrolet	29.942	180.349	30.079	179.527
Eliminated in Round 1
13	16	Brett Moffitt	Hattori Racing Enterprises	Toyota	29.943	180.343	—	—
14	52	Stewart Friesen	Halmar Friesen Racing	Chevrolet	29.951	180.294	—	—
15	7	Korbin Forrister	All Out Motorsports	Toyota	29.973	180.162	—	—
16	20	Tate Fogleman	Young's Motorsports	Chevrolet	30.034	179.796	—	—
17	8	John Hunter Nemechek	NEMCO Motorsports	Chevrolet	30.067	179.599	—	—
18	22	Austin Wayne Self	Niece Motorsports	Chevrolet	30.215	178.719	—	—
19	45	Justin Fontaine	Niece Motorsports	Chevrolet	30.264	178.430	—	—
20	3	Jordan Anderson	Jordan Anderson Racing	Chevrolet	30.348	177.936	—	—
21	68	Clay Greenfield	Clay Greenfield Motorsports	Chevrolet	30.371	177.801	—	—
22	54	Bo LeMastus	DGR-Crosley	Toyota	30.595	176.499	—	—
23	15	Robby Lyons	Premium Motorsports	Chevrolet	30.618	176.367	—	—
24	83	Tyler Matthews	Copp Motorsports	Chevrolet	30.683	175.993	—	—
25	0	Camden Murphy	Jennifer Jo Cobb Racing	Chevrolet	30.742	175.655	—	—
26	33	Josh Reaume	Reaume Brothers Racing	Chevrolet	30.830	175.154	—	—
27	63	Bayley Currey	MB Motorsports	Chevrolet	30.989	174.255	—	—
Qualified by owner's points
28	49	Wendell Chavous	Premium Motorsports	Chevrolet	31.219	172.972	—	—
29	10	Jennifer Jo Cobb	Jennifer Jo Cobb Racing	Chevrolet	31.264	172.723	—	—
30	88	Matt Crafton	ThorSport Racing	Ford	31.927	169.136	—	—
31	6	Norm Benning	Norm Benning Racing	Chevrolet	32.878	164.244	—	—
32	13	Myatt Snider	ThorSport Racing	Ford	—	—	—	—
Failed to qualify
33	87	Joe Nemechek	NEMCO Motorsports	Chevrolet	31.043	173.952	—	—
34	50	Timmy Hill	Beaver Motorsports	Chevrolet	31.238	172.866	—	—
Official qualifying results
Official starting lineup

== Race results ==
Stage 1 Laps: 35

Pos.	#	Driver	Team	Make	Pts
1	41	Ben Rhodes	ThorSport Racing	Ford	10
2	18	Noah Gragson	Kyle Busch Motorsports	Toyota	9
3	4	Todd Gilliland	Kyle Busch Motorsports	Toyota	8
4	51	Brandon Jones	Kyle Busch Motorsports	Toyota	0
5	98	Grant Enfinger	ThorSport Racing	Ford	6
6	88	Matt Crafton	ThorSport Racing	Ford	5
7	52	Stewart Friesen	Halmar Friesen Racing	Chevrolet	4
8	75	Parker Kligerman	Henderson Motorsports	Chevrolet	3
9	21	Johnny Sauter	GMS Racing	Chevrolet	2
10	25	Dalton Sargeant	GMS Racing	Chevrolet	1

Stage 2 Laps: 35

Pos.	#	Driver	Team	Make	Pts
1	18	Noah Gragson	Kyle Busch Motorsports	Toyota	10
2	51	Brandon Jones	Kyle Busch Motorsports	Toyota	0
3	41	Ben Rhodes	ThorSport Racing	Ford	8
4	52	Stewart Friesen	Halmar Friesen Racing	Chevrolet	7
5	98	Grant Enfinger	ThorSport Racing	Ford	6
6	4	Todd Gilliland	Kyle Busch Motorsports	Toyota	5
7	24	Justin Haley	GMS Racing	Chevrolet	4
8	8	John Hunter Nemechek	NEMCO Motorsports	Chevrolet	0
9	88	Matt Crafton	ThorSport Racing	Ford	2
10	21	Johnny Sauter	GMS Racing	Chevrolet	1

Stage 3 Laps: 80

Fin	St	#	Driver	Team	Make	Laps	Led	Status	Pts
1	3	41	Ben Rhodes	ThorSport Racing	Ford	150	38	running	58
2	14	52	Stewart Friesen	Halmar Friesen Racing	Chevrolet	150	37	running	46
3	30	88	Matt Crafton	ThorSport Racing	Ford	150	0	running	41
4	6	51	Brandon Jones	Kyle Busch Motorsports	Toyota	150	0	running	0
5	17	8	John Hunter Nemechek	NEMCO Motorsports	Chevrolet	150	0	running	0
6	5	98	Grant Enfinger	ThorSport Racing	Ford	150	0	running	43
7	2	4	Todd Gilliland	Kyle Busch Motorsports	Toyota	150	1	running	43
8	1	18	Noah Gragson	Kyle Busch Motorsports	Toyota	150	62	running	48
9	9	25	Dalton Sargeant	GMS Racing	Chevrolet	150	0	running	29
10	10	24	Justin Haley	GMS Racing	Chevrolet	150	0	running	31
11	4	17	Chris Eggleston	DGR-Crosley	Toyota	149	0	running	26
12	11	2	Cody Coughlin	GMS Racing	Chevrolet	149	0	running	25
13	15	7	Korbin Forrister	All Out Motorsports	Toyota	149	0	running	24
14	18	22	Austin Wayne Self	Niece Motorsports	Chevrolet	149	0	running	23
15	7	21	Johnny Sauter	GMS Racing	Chevrolet	148	0	running	25
16	12	02	Austin Hill	Young's Motorsports	Chevrolet	148	0	running	21
17	19	45	Justin Fontaine	Niece Motorsports	Chevrolet	148	0	running	20
18	13	16	Brett Moffitt	Hattori Racing Enterprises	Toyota	148	0	running	19
19	20	3	Jordan Anderson	Jordan Anderson Racing	Chevrolet	146	0	running	18
20	22	54	Bo LeMastus	DGR-Crosley	Toyota	146	0	running	17
21	21	68	Clay Greenfield	Clay Greenfield Motorsports	Chevrolet	145	0	running	16
22	23	15	Robby Lyons	Premium Motorsports	Chevrolet	143	0	running	15
23	26	33	Josh Reaume	Reaume Brothers Racing	Chevrolet	143	0	running	14
24	28	49	Wendell Chavous	Premium Motorsports	Chevrolet	139	0	running	13
25	31	6	Norm Benning	Norm Benning Racing	Chevrolet	138	0	running	12
26	32	13	Myatt Snider	ThorSport Racing	Ford	137	0	running	11
27	8	75	Parker Kligerman	Henderson Motorsports	Chevrolet	133	12	crash	13
28	16	20	Tate Fogleman	Young's Motorsports	Chevrolet	103	0	suspension	9
29	29	10	Jennifer Jo Cobb	Jennifer Jo Cobb Racing	Chevrolet	28	0	overheating	8
30	27	63	Bayley Currey	MB Motorsports	Chevrolet	22	0	vibration	7
31	25	0	Camden Murphy	Jennifer Jo Cobb Racing	Chevrolet	11	0	electrical	6
32	24	83	Tyler Matthews	Copp Motorsports	Chevrolet	1	0	crash	5
Failed to qualify
33		87	Joe Nemechek	NEMCO Motorsports	Chevrolet				
34		50	Timmy Hill	Beaver Motorsports	Chevrolet				
Official race results

Previous race: 2018 Overton's 225	NASCAR Camping World Truck Series; 2018 season	Next race: 2018 Eldora Dirt Derby
