= 2019 Strat 200 =

Race details
- Race 3 of 23 in the 2019 NASCAR Gander Outdoors Truck Series season
- Date: March 1, 2019
- Location: Las Vegas Motor Speedway in Las Vegas
- Course: Permanent racing facility
- Course length: 1.5 miles (2.414 km)
- Distance: 134 laps, 201 mi (323.478 km)

Pole position
Driver	Kyle Busch	Kyle Busch Motorsports
- Time: 30.184

Most laps led
Driver	Kyle Busch	Kyle Busch Motorsports
- Laps: 110

Winner
No. 51	Kyle Busch	Kyle Busch Motorsports

Television in the United States
- Network: FS1

Radio in the United States
- Radio: MRN

The 2019 Strat 200 was a NASCAR Gander Outdoors Truck Series race held on March 1, 2019, at Las Vegas Motor Speedway in Las Vegas. Contested over 134 laps on the 1.5-mile (2.4-kilometre) asphalt intermediate speedway, it was the third race of the 2019 NASCAR Gander Outdoors Truck Series season.

Kyle Busch (Kyle Busch Motorsports) won back-to-back races in the NASCAR Gander Outdoors Truck Series – having won the previous week's Ultimate Tailgating 200 – leading 110 out of the race's 134 laps, after starting the race from pole position.

== Entry list ==
No.	Driver	Team	Manufacturer
1	Stefan Parsons	Beaver Motorsports	Chevrolet
02	Tyler Dippel (R)	Young's Motorsports	Chevrolet
2	Sheldon Creed (R)	GMS Racing	Chevrolet
3	Jordan Anderson	Jordan Anderson Racing	Chevrolet
04	Cory Roper	Roper Racing	Ford
4	Todd Gilliland	Kyle Busch Motorsports	Toyota
6	Norm Benning	Norm Benning Racing	Chevrolet
7	Korbin Forrister	All Out Motorsports	Toyota
8	Angela Ruch	NEMCO Motorsports	Chevrolet
10	Jennifer Jo Cobb	Jennifer Jo Cobb Racing	Chevrolet
12	Gus Dean (R)	Young's Motorsports	Chevrolet
13	Johnny Sauter	ThorSport Racing	Ford
15	Anthony Alfredo (R)	DGR-Crosley	Toyota
16	Austin Hill	Hattori Racing Enterprises	Toyota
17	Ryan Reed	DGR-Crosley	Toyota
18	Harrison Burton (R)	Kyle Busch Motorsports	Toyota
20	Spencer Boyd (R)	Young's Motorsports	Chevrolet
22	Austin Wayne Self	AM Racing	Chevrolet
24	Brett Moffitt	GMS Racing	Chevrolet
30	Brennan Poole (R)	On Point Motorsports	Toyota
33	Josh Reaume	Reaume Brothers Racing	Chevrolet
34	Jesse Iwuji	Reaume Brothers Racing	Chevrolet
44	Timothy Peters	Niece Motorsports	Chevrolet
45	Ross Chastain (i)	Niece Motorsports	Chevrolet
51	Kyle Busch (i)	Kyle Busch Motorsports	Toyota
52	Stewart Friesen	Halmar Friesen Racing	Chevrolet
54	Natalie Decker (R)	DGR-Crosley	Toyota
63	Scott Stenzel	Copp Motorsports	Chevrolet
88	Matt Crafton	ThorSport Racing	Ford
97	Jesse Little	JJL Motorsports	Ford
98	Grant Enfinger	ThorSport Racing	Ford
99	Ben Rhodes	ThorSport Racing	Ford

== Practice ==
=== First practice ===
Johnny Sauter was the fastest in the first practice session with a time of 30.219 seconds and a speed of 178.696 mph (287.583 km/h).

Pos	No.	Driver	Team	Manufacturer	Time	Speed
1	13	Johnny Sauter	ThorSport Racing	Ford	30.219	178.696
2	99	Ben Rhodes	ThorSport Racing	Ford	30.239	178.577
3	2	Sheldon Creed (R)	GMS Racing	Chevrolet	30.323	178.083

=== Final practice ===
Matt Crafton was the fastest in the final practice session with a time of 30.013 seconds and a speed of 179.922 mph (289.556 km/h).

Pos	No.	Driver	Team	Manufacturer	Time	Speed
1	88	Matt Crafton	ThorSport Racing	Ford	30.013	179.922
2	13	Johnny Sauter	ThorSport Racing	Ford	30.047	179.718
3	24	Brett Moffitt	GMS Racing	Chevrolet	30.052	179.689

== Qualifying ==
Kyle Busch scored the pole for the race with a time of 30.184 seconds and a speed of 178.903 mph (287.916 km/h).

=== Qualifying results ===
Pos	No	Driver	Team	Manufacturer	R1	R2
1	51	Kyle Busch (i)	Kyle Busch Motorsports	Toyota	30.225	30.184
2	24	Brett Moffitt	GMS Racing	Chevrolet	30.353	30.276
3	18	Harrison Burton (R)	Kyle Busch Motorsports	Toyota	30.350	30.299
4	98	Grant Enfinger	ThorSport Racing	Ford	30.515	30.331
5	04	Cory Roper	Roper Racing	Ford	30.429	30.355
6	16	Austin Hill	Hattori Racing Enterprises	Toyota	30.476	30.383
7	52	Stewart Friesen	Halmar Friesen Racing	Chevrolet	30.494	30.419
8	30	Brennan Poole (R)	On Point Motorsports	Toyota	30.456	30.421
9	2	Sheldon Creed (R)	GMS Racing	Chevrolet	30.508	30.434
10	17	Ryan Reed	DGR-Crosley	Toyota	30.548	30.458
11	13	Johnny Sauter	ThorSport Racing	Ford	30.502	30.468
12	54	Natalie Decker (R)	DGR-Crosley	Toyota	30.505	30.544
13	4	Todd Gilliland	Kyle Busch Motorsports	Toyota	30.560	—
14	15	Anthony Alfredo (R)	DGR-Crosley	Toyota	30.591	—
15	88	Matt Crafton	ThorSport Racing	Ford	30.595	—
16	45	Ross Chastain (i)	Niece Motorsports	Chevrolet	30.625	—
17	97	Jesse Little	JJL Motorsports	Ford	30.652	—
18	44	Timothy Peters	Niece Motorsports	Chevrolet	30.661	—
19	99	Ben Rhodes	ThorSport Racing	Ford	30.706	—
20	3	Jordan Anderson	Jordan Anderson Racing	Chevrolet	30.709	—
21	02	Tyler Dippel (R)	Young's Motorsports	Chevrolet	30.817	—
22	8	Angela Ruch	NEMCO Motorsports	Chevrolet	30.893	—
23	20	Spencer Boyd (R)	Young's Motorsports	Chevrolet	30.919	—
24	22	Austin Wayne Self	AM Racing	Chevrolet	31.034	—
25	7	Korbin Forrister	All Out Motorsports	Toyota	31.079	—
26	12	Gus Dean (R)	Young's Motorsports	Chevrolet	31.577	—
27	1	Stefan Parsons	Beaver Motorsports	Chevrolet	31.720	—
28	34	Jesse Iwuji	Reaume Brothers Racing	Chevrolet	31.802	—
29	10	Jennifer Jo Cobb	Jennifer Jo Cobb Racing	Chevrolet	31.914	—
30	63	Scott Stenzel	Copp Motorsports	Chevrolet	32.537	—
31	33	Josh Reaume	Reaume Brothers Racing	Chevrolet	33.647	—
32	6	Norm Benning	Norm Benning Racing	Chevrolet	33.801	—

== Race ==
=== Stage results ===
Stage One Laps: 30

Pos	No	Driver	Team	Manufacturer	Points
1	51	Kyle Busch (i)	Kyle Busch Motorsports	Toyota	0
2	24	Brett Moffitt	GMS Racing	Chevrolet	9
3	16	Austin Hill	Hattori Racing Enterprises	Toyota	8
4	18	Harrison Burton (R)	Kyle Busch Motorsports	Toyota	7
5	45	Ross Chastain (i)	Niece Motorsports	Chevrolet	0
6	4	Todd Gilliland	Kyle Busch Motorsports	Toyota	5
7	52	Stewart Friesen	Halmar Friesen Racing	Chevrolet	4
8	17	Ryan Reed	DGR-Crosley	Toyota	3
9	44	Timothy Peters	Niece Motorsports	Chevrolet	2
10	99	Ben Rhodes	ThorSport Racing	Ford	1

Stage Two Laps: 30

Pos	No	Driver	Team	Manufacturer	Points
1	51	Kyle Busch (i)	Kyle Busch Motorsports	Toyota	0
2	52	Stewart Friesen	Halmar Friesen Racing	Chevrolet	9
3	45	Ross Chastain (i)	Niece Motorsports	Chevrolet	0
4	4	Todd Gilliland	Kyle Busch Motorsports	Toyota	7
5	99	Ben Rhodes	ThorSport Racing	Ford	6
6	18	Harrison Burton (R)	Kyle Busch Motorsports	Toyota	5
7	2	Sheldon Creed (R)	GMS Racing	Chevrolet	4
8	16	Austin Hill	Hattori Racing Enterprises	Toyota	3
9	88	Matt Crafton	ThorSport Racing	Ford	2
10	24	Brett Moffitt	GMS Racing	Chevrolet	1

=== Final stage results ===
Stage Three Laps: 74

Pos	Grid	No	Driver	Team	Manufacturer	Laps	Points
1	1	51	Kyle Busch (i)	Kyle Busch Motorsports	Toyota	134	0
2	2	24	Brett Moffitt	GMS Racing	Chevrolet	134	45
3	15	88	Matt Crafton	ThorSport Racing	Ford	134	36
4	7	52	Stewart Friesen	Halmar Friesen Racing	Chevrolet	134	46
5	3	18	Harrison Burton (R)	Kyle Busch Motorsports	Toyota	134	44
6	9	2	Sheldon Creed (R)	GMS Racing	Chevrolet	134	35
7	13	4	Todd Gilliland	Kyle Busch Motorsports	Toyota	134	42
8	11	13	Johnny Sauter	ThorSport Racing	Ford	134	29
9	10	17	Ryan Reed	DGR Crosley	Toyota	134	31
10	16	45	Ross Chastain (i)	Niece Motorsports	Chevrolet	133	0
11	4	98	Grant Enfinger	ThorSport Racing	Ford	133	26
12	18	44	Timothy Peters	Niece Motorsports	Chevrolet	133	27
13	12	54	Natalie Decker (R)	DGR Crosley	Toyota	133	24
14	25	7	Korbin Forrister	All Out Motorsports	Toyota	132	23
15	24	22	Austin Wayne Self	AM Racing	Chevrolet	132	22
16	22	8	Angela Ruch	NEMCO Motorsports	Chevrolet	132	21
17	21	02	Tyler Dippel (R)	Young's Motorsports	Chevrolet	132	20
18	14	15	Anthony Alfredo (R)	DGR-Crosley	Toyota	132	19
19	17	97	Jesse Little	JJL Motorsports	Ford	132	18
20	8	30	Brennan Poole (R)	On Point Motorsports	Toyota	131	17
21	20	3	Jordan Anderson	Jordan Anderson Racing	Chevrolet	130	16
22	26	12	Gus Dean (R)	Young's Motorsports	Chevrolet	130	15
23	31	33	Josh Reaume	Reaume Brothers Racing	Chevrolet	129	14
24	5	04	Cory Roper	Roper Racing	Ford	127	13
25	19	99	Ben Rhodes	ThorSport Racing	Ford	125	19
26	28	34	Jesse Iwuji	Reaume Brothers Racing	Chevrolet	124	11
27	29	10	Jennifer Jo Cobb	Jennifer Jo Cobb Racing	Chevrolet	123	10
28	32	6	Norm Benning	Norm Benning Racing	Chevrolet	121	9
29	23	20	Spencer Boyd (R)	Young's Motorsports	Chevrolet	108	8
30	6	16	Austin Hill	Hattori Racing Enterprises	Toyota	82	18
31	27	1	Stefan Parsons	Beaver Motorsports	Chevrolet	67	6
32	30	63	Scott Stenzel	Copp Motorsports	Chevrolet	34	5

Previous race: 2019 Ultimate Tailgating 200	NASCAR Gander Outdoors Truck Series; 2019 season	Next race: 2019 TruNorth Global 250
