= Gus Dean =

American racing driver (born 1994)

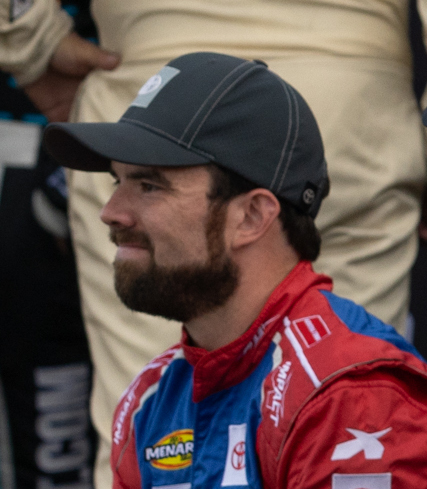
- Dean at Iowa Speedway in 2024
- Born: August 19, 1994 (age 32); Bluffton, South Carolina, U.S.

NASCAR O'Reilly Auto Parts Series career
- 1 race run over 1 year
- 2024 position: 75th
- Best finish: 75th (2024)
- First race: 2024 Wawa 250 (Daytona)
Wins	Top tens	Poles
0	0	0

NASCAR FedEx Freight Truck Series career
- 26 races run over 3 years
- 2021 position: 86th
- Best finish: 15th (2019)
- First race: 2019 NextEra Energy 250 (Daytona)
- Last race: 2021 NextEra Energy 250 (Daytona)
Wins	Top tens	Poles
0	0	0

ARCA Menards Series career
- 72 races run over 9 years
- Best finish: 4th (2017)
- First race: 2016 Lucas Oil 200 (Daytona)
- Last race: 2026 Alabama Manufactured Housing 200 (Talladega)
- First win: 2016 General Tire 200 (Talladega)
- Last win: 2024 Hard Rock Bet 200 (Daytona)
Wins	Top tens	Poles
3	42	3

ARCA Menards Series East career
- 4 races run over 4 years
- Best finish: 37th (2020)
- First race: 2015 UNOH 100 (Richmond)
- Last race: 2024 Atlas 150 (Iowa)
Wins	Top tens	Poles
0	2	0
- Statistics up to date as of April 25, 2026.

August H. Dean (born August 19, 1994) is an American professional stock car racing driver. He last competed part-time in the ARCA Menards Series, driving the No. 25 Toyota Camry for Nitro Motorsports. He previously drove in the series for Win-Tron Racing full-time in 2017 and 2018 and part-time in 2016, 2019 and 2020. Dean also drove for Mason Mitchell Motorsports part-time in ARCA in 2016, winning the race at Talladega that year. Dean also competed in the NASCAR Camping World Truck Series full-time in 2019 for Young's Motorsports, and part-time in 2020 and 2021 for Hill Motorsports.

== Personal life ==
Dean is a native of Bluffton, South Carolina and the son of Charlie Dean, an HVAC company owner. Dean credits his grandfather, Charles Dean Sr., for inspiring his passion for stock car racing.

== Racing career ==
=== ARCA Menards Series ===
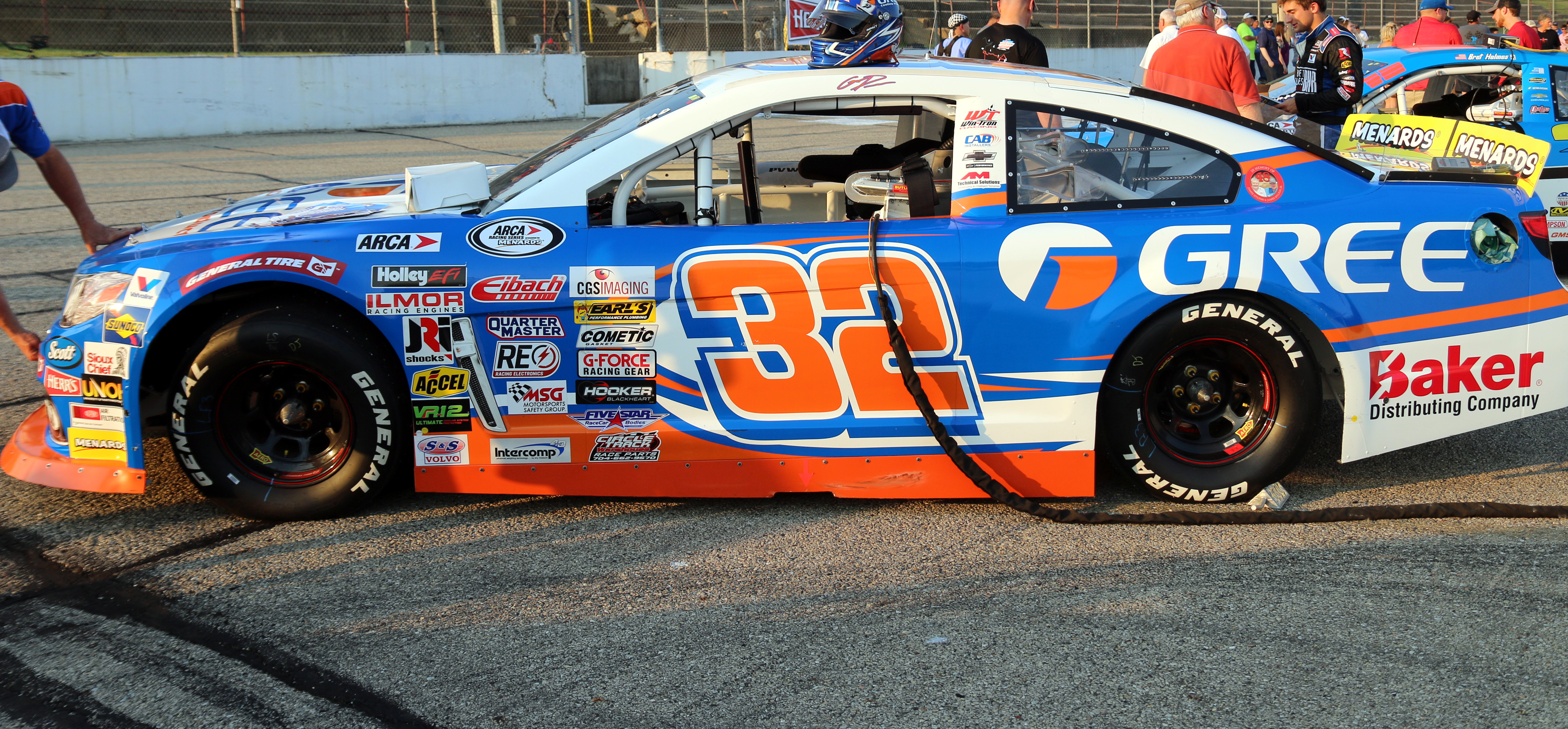
2018 ARCA car

Dean began racing part-time in 2016 with Mason Mitchell Motorsports, scoring his first career win at Talladega in April. In 2017, he ran the full schedule with Win-Tron Racing, scoring a fourth-place points finish but lost rookie of the year to Riley Herbst in the season finale at Kansas. He returned to the organization in 2018, scoring his second career win at Elko Speedway and finishing sixth in final points.

From 2022 to 2024, Dean raced part-time for Venturini Motorsports. He won the season opening race at Daytona in 2024, his first with Venturini.

After not competing in stock cars the previous year, it was revealed in 2026 that Dean would participate in the pre-season test for the series at Daytona International Speedway, driving the No. 25 Toyota for Nitro Motorsports, where he set the fastest time between the two sessions held. It was later announced that Dean will drive for Nitro at Daytona and Talladega.

=== NASCAR Truck Series ===
On January 9, 2019, it was announced that Dean would drive the No. 12 full-time for Young's Motorsports in 2019. He finished his Truck rookie season 15th in points.

Dean chose not to return to Young's Motorsports after the 2019 season. On February 4, 2020, he joined Hill Motorsports in their No. 56 Chevrolet Silverado for the season opener at Daytona International Speedway.

=== NASCAR Xfinity Series ===
On August 19, 2024, AM Racing announced that Dean would pilot the No. 15 Ford Mustang at the 2024 Wawa 250.

== Motorsports career results ==
=== NASCAR ===
(key) (Bold – Pole position awarded by qualifying time. Italics – Pole position earned by points standings or practice time. * – Most laps led.)

==== Xfinity Series ====
NASCAR Xfinity Series results
Year	Team	No.	Make	1	2	3	4	5	6	7	8	9	10	11	12	13	14	15	16	17	18	19	20	21	22	23	24	25	26	27	28	29	30	31	32	33	NXSC	Pts	Ref
2024	AM Racing	15	Ford	DAY	ATL	LVS	PHO	COA	RCH	MAR	TEX	TAL	DOV	DAR	CLT	PIR	SON	IOW	NHA	NSH	CSC	POC	IND	MCH	DAY; 36	DAR	ATL	GLN	BRI	KAN	TAL	ROV	LVS	HOM	MAR	PHO	75th	1	

==== Camping World Truck Series ====
NASCAR Camping World Truck Series results
Year	Team	No.	Make	1	2	3	4	5	6	7	8	9	10	11	12	13	14	15	16	17	18	19	20	21	22	23	NCWTC	Pts	Ref
2019	Young's Motorsports	12	Chevy	DAY; 15	ATL; 15	LVS; 22	MAR; 32	TEX; 29	DOV; 14	KAN; 14	CLT; 26	TEX; 32	IOW; 20	GTW; 19	CHI; 15	KEN; 25	POC; 14	ELD; 28	MCH; 13	BRI; 18	MSP; 17	LVS; 15	TAL; 20	MAR; 14	PHO; 20	HOM; 15	15th	413	
2020	Hill Motorsports	56	Chevy	DAY; 26	LVS	CLT	ATL	HOM	POC	KEN	TEX	KAN	KAN	MCH	DAY	DOV	GTW	DAR	RCH	BRI	LVS	TAL; 30	KAN	TEX	MAR	PHO	57th	22	
2021	Hill Motorsports	56	Chevy	DAY; 34	DAY	LVS	ATL	BRI	RCH	KAN	DAR	COA	CLT	TEX	NSH	POC	KNX	GLN	GTW	DAR	BRI	LVS	TAL	MAR	PHO		86th	3	

^{*} Season still in progress
^{1} Ineligible for series points

=== ARCA Menards Series ===
(key) (Bold – Pole position awarded by qualifying time. Italics – Pole position earned by points standings or practice time. * – Most laps led.)

ARCA Menards Series results
Year	Team	No.	Make	1	2	3	4	5	6	7	8	9	10	11	12	13	14	15	16	17	18	19	20	AMSC	Pts	Ref
2016	Mason Mitchell Motorsports	98	Chevy	DAY; 35	NSH	SLM	TAL; 1	TOL; 7	NJE	POC	MCH	MAD	WIN	IOW		POC; 15	BLN	ISF	DSF	SLM	CHI	KEN; 21		26th	1060	
2016	Mason Mitchell Motorsports	78	Chevy												IRP; 9									26th	1060	
2016	Win-Tron Racing	33	Toyota																				KAN; 25	26th	1060	
2017	Win-Tron Racing	32	Toyota	DAY; 32	NSH; 23	SLM; 2	TAL; 6	TOL; 7	ELK; 5	POC; 5	MCH; 5	MAD; 9	IOW; 10	IRP; 6	POC; 7	WIN; 5	ISF; 11	ROA; 9	DSF; 3	SLM; 5	CHI; 14	KEN; 18	KAN; 15	4th	4595	
2018	Win-Tron Racing	32	Chevy	DAY; 25	NSH; 17	SLM; 7	TAL; 12	TOL; 20	CLT; 14	POC; 6	MCH; 4	MAD; 5	GTW; 6	CHI; 16	IOW; 20	ELK; 1	**POC**; 27	**ISF**; 7	BLN; 5	DSF; 18	SLM; 2	IRP; 10	KAN; 18	6th	4295	
2019	Win-Tron Racing	32	Chevy	DAY; 26	FIF	SLM	TAL; 6	NSH	TOL	CLT; 3	POC	MCH	MAD	GTW	CHI	ELK	IOW	POC	ISF	DSF	SLM	IRP	KAN; 10	25th	705	
2020	Win-Tron Racing	32	Chevy	DAY; 23	PHO	TAL; 16	POC	IRP	KEN	IOW	KAN	TOL	TOL	MCH	DAY	GTW	L44	TOL	BRI; 12	WIN	MEM; 11	ISF	KAN	30th	114	
2022	Venturini Motorsports	55	Toyota	DAY; 5	PHO	TAL; 5																		25th	157	
2022	Venturini Motorsports	15	Toyota				KAN; 4	CLT	IOW	BLN	ELK	MOH	POC	IRP	MCH; 5	GLN	ISF	MLW	DSF	KAN	BRI	SLM	TOL	25th	157	
2023	Venturini Motorsports	25	Toyota	DAY; 35	PHO	TAL; 2	KAN	CLT; 15	BLN	ELK	MOH	IOW	POC	MCH; 2	IRP	GLN	ISF							29th	149	
2023	Venturini Motorsports	55	Toyota															MLW; 10	DSF	KAN	BRI	SLM	TOL	29th	149	
2024	Venturini Motorsports	55	Toyota	DAY; 1	PHO	TAL; 4	DOV	KAN	CLT; 6	IOW; 7	MOH	BLN	IRP	SLM; 14	ELK	MCH; 14	ISF	MLW	DSF	GLN	BRI	KAN	TOL	21st	222	
2026	Nitro Motorsports	25	Toyota	**DAY**; 29	PHO	KAN	TAL; 3	GLN	TOL	MCH	POC	BER	ELK	CHI	LRP	IRP	IOW	ISF	MAD	DSF	SLM	BRI	KAN	68th	58	

==== ARCA Menards Series East ====
ARCA Menards Series East results
Year	Team	No.	Make	1	2	3	4	5	6	7	8	9	10	11	12	13	14	AMSEC	Pts	Ref
2015	Charles Dean	56	Chevy	NSM	GRE	BRI	IOW	BGS	LGY	COL	NHA	IOW	GLN	MOT	VIR	RCH; 33	DOV	64th	11	
2020	Win-Tron Racing	32	Chevy	NSM	TOL	DOV	TOL	BRI; 12	FIF									37th	32	
2023	Venturini Motorsports	55	Toyota	FIF	DOV	NSV	FRS	IOW	IRP	MLW; 10	BRI							39th	34	
2024	Venturini Motorsports	55	Toyota	FIF	DOV	NSV	FRS	IOW; 7	IRP	MLW	BRI							44th	37	

=== CARS Super Late Model Tour ===
(key)

CARS Super Late Model Tour results
Year	Team	No.	Make	1	2	3	4	5	6	7	8	9	10	11	12	13	CSLMTC	Pts	Ref
2015	Charles Dean	56	Ford	SNM; 20	ROU; 24	HCY; 26	SNM; 27	TCM	MMS; 9	ROU; 22	CON	MYB; 13	HCY				24th	87	
2016	Charles Dean	44	Ford	SNM; 13													10th	146	
2016	Charles Dean	56	Chevy		ROU; 21												10th	146	
2016	Charles Dean	56	Ford			HCY; 14	TCM; 16	GRE; 10	ROU	CON	MYB; 2	HCY	SNM; 9				10th	146	
2017	Dean Racing	56	Chevy	CON; 9	DOM	DOM	HCY	HCY	BRI	AND	ROU	TCM	ROU	HCY	CON	SBO	40th	24	
2018	Dean Racing	56	Chevy	MYB; 9	NSH	ROU	HCY	BRI	AND	HCY	ROU	SBO					37th	24	
2019	Dean Racing	56	Chevy	SNM	HCY	NSH	MMS	BRI	HCY; 21	ROU	SBO						49th	12	
2020	Dean Racing	56	Chevy	SNM	HCY	JEN	HCY	FCS; 3	BRI	FLC	NSH						20th	30	

=== CARS Pro Late Model Tour ===
(key)

CARS Pro Late Model Tour results
Year	Team	No.	Make	1	2	3	4	5	6	7	8	9	10	11	12	CPLMTC	Pts	Ref
2022	N/A	57	Chevy	CRW	HCY	GPS	FCS; 9	TCM	HCY	ACE	MMS	TCM	ACE	SBO	CRW	41st	25	
