= All Out Motorsports =

American stock car racing team

- Owner(s): Ken Forrister; Karen Forrister
- Series: NASCAR Gander RV & Outdoors Truck Series
- Race drivers: 7. Korbin Forrister
- Manufacturer: Toyota
- Opened: 2018
- Closed: 2021

Career
- Debut: 2018 NextEra Energy Resources 250 (Daytona)
- Latest race: 2020 Buckle Up in Your Truck 225 (Kentucky)
- Races competed: 23
- Drivers' Championships: 0
- Race victories: 0
- Pole positions: 0

All Out Motorsports was an American professional stock car racing team that used to compete in the NASCAR Gander RV & Outdoors Truck Series. The team used to field the No. 7 Toyota Tundra for Korbin Forrister.

== Gander RV & Outdoors Truck Series ==
=== Truck No. 7 history ===
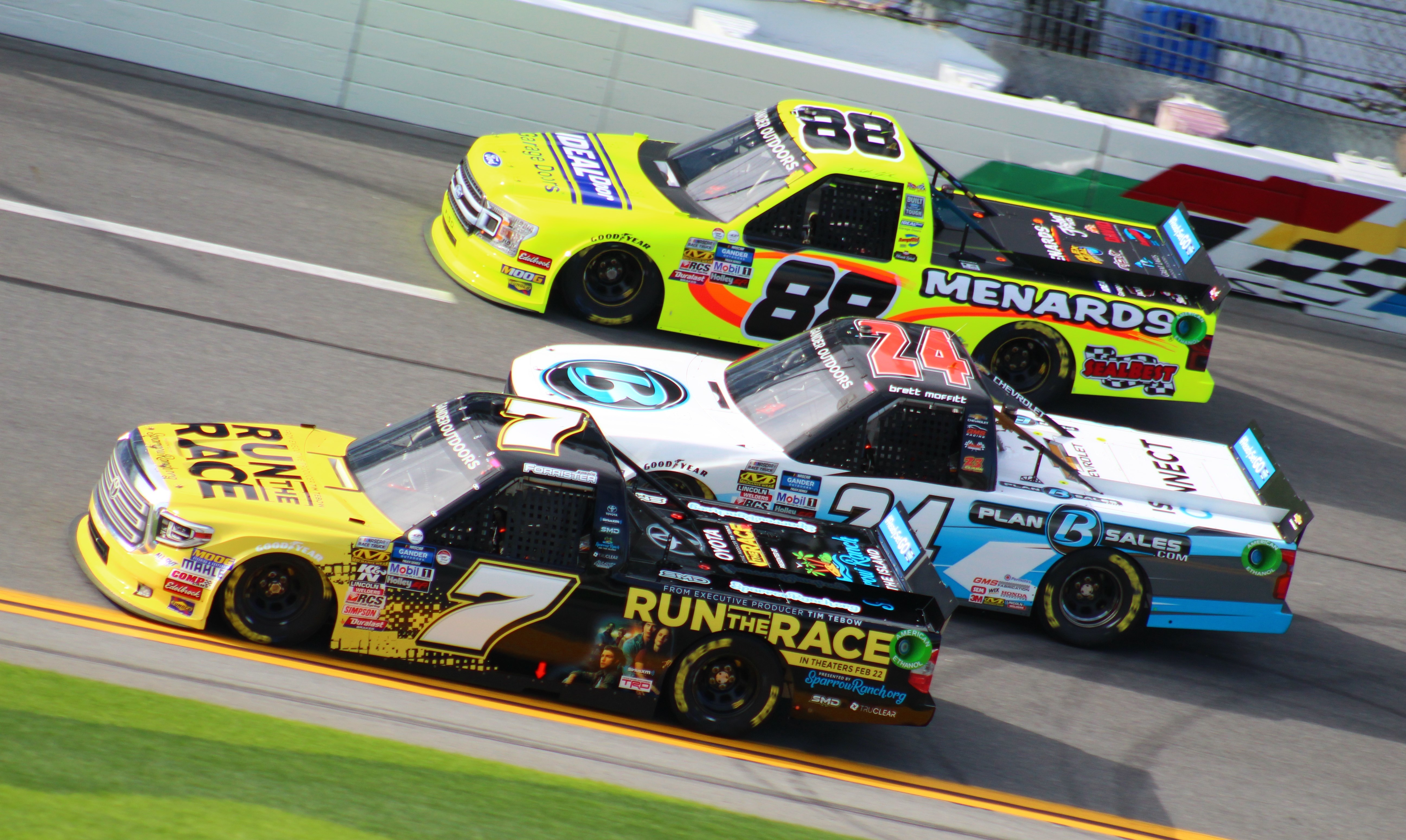
Forrister racing against Matt Crafton (No. 88) and Brett Moffitt (No. 24) at Daytona in 2019.

On January 31, 2018, it was announced that driver Korbin Forrister had formed his own race team, fielding the No. 7 Toyota Tundra for himself. Forrister and the team announced a 10 race schedule for the 2018 season; Daytona, Dover, Charlotte, Iowa, Chicagoland, Eldora, Michigan, Bristol, Talladega, and Phoenix. He also ran the race at Atlanta and Texas. Forrister failed to qualify for Charlotte because of a qualifying rainout. Reid Wilson attempted the fall race at Texas, but failed to qualify.

After running part-time schedules in 2018 and 2019, crew chief Wally Rogers indicated on June 18, 2019, that the team had closed. Reports also included shop doors being locked and employees having been fired. Forrister said the following day that the team was still functioning, just regrouping and reorganizing.

The team attempted their next race at Talladega in October 2019, with Danny Gill replacing Rogers as crew chief, as Rogers had moved to Jordan Anderson Racing to be the crew chief of their No. 3 truck after All Out stopped attempting races for many months. Forrister finished 13th in the race.

All Out Motorsports returned for 2020, running the first few races.

Team is not longer competing in the truck series at the moment and is closed.

==== Truck No. 7 results ====
Year	Team	No.	Make	1	2	3	4	5	6	7	8	9	10	11	12	13	14	15	16	17	18	19	20	21	22	23	NGOTC	Pts
2018	Korbin Forrister	7	Toyota	DAY; 16	ATL; 16	LVS	MAR	DOV; 21	KAN	CLT; DNQ	TEX; 22	IOW	GTW	CHI; 18	KEN; 13	ELD	POC	MCH; 24	BRI; 27	MSP	LVS; 13	TAL; 15	MAR				28th	188
2018	Reid Wilson	7	Toyota																					TEX; DNQ	PHO	HOM	28th	188
2019	Korbin Forrister	7	Toyota	DAY; DNQ	ATL; 21	LVS; 14	MAR; 25	TEX; 24	DOV; 30	KAN	CLT; 25	TEX	IOW	GTW	CHI	KEN	POC	ELD	MCH	BRI	MSP	LVS	TAL; 13	MAR	PHO	HOM	35th	107
2020	Korbin Forrister	7	Toyota	DAY; 18	LVS; DNQ	CLT; 24	ATL; 29	HOM; 33	POC; 24	KEN; 34	TEX	KAN	KAN	RCH	DOV	TEX	IOW	ELD	MCH	GTW	MSP	BRI	LVS	TAL	MAR	PHO	-*	-*

^{*} Season still in progress
