= 2019 NextEra Energy 250 =

Race details
- Race 1 of 23 in the 2019 NASCAR Gander Outdoors Truck Series season
- Date: February 15, 2019
- Location: Daytona International Speedway in Daytona Beach, Florida
- Course: Permanent racing facility
- Course length: 2.5 miles (4.023 km)
- Distance: 111 laps, 277.5 mi (446.593 km)
- Scheduled distance: 100 laps, 250 mi (402.336 km)

Pole position
Driver	Christian Eckes	Kyle Busch Motorsports
- Time: 49.287

Most laps led
Driver	Austin Hill	Hattori Racing Enterprises
- Laps: 39

Winner
No. 16	Austin Hill	Hattori Racing Enterprises

Television in the United States
- Network: FS1
- Announcers: Vince Welch, Michael Waltrip, Phil Parsons

Radio in the United States
- Radio: MRN

The 2019 NextEra Energy 250 was a NASCAR Gander Outdoors Truck Series race held on February 15, 2019. Contested over 111 laps due to an overtime finish, on the 2.5-mile (4.0 km) asphalt superspeedway. It was the first race of the 2019 NASCAR Gander Outdoors Truck Series season.

== Entry list ==
No.	Driver	Team	Manufacturer	Sponsor
02	Tyler Dippel (R)	Young's Motorsports	Chevrolet	Danda Concrete "Can't Beat Crete", Lobas! Productions
2	Sheldon Creed (R)	GMS Racing	Chevrolet	United Rentals, A. M. Ortega
3	Jordan Anderson	Jordan Anderson Racing	Chevrolet	FVP Parts "Verified. Proven.", Bommarito Automotive Group
04	Cory Roper	Roper Racing	Ford	Roper Racing
4	Todd Gilliland	Kyle Busch Motorsports	Toyota	JBL
6	Norm Benning	Norm Benning Racing	Chevrolet	Zomongo
7	Korbin Forrister	All Out Motorsports	Toyota	Run the Race
8	Angela Ruch	NEMCO Motorsports	Chevrolet	JJ Resources
9	Codie Rohrbaugh	Grant County Mulch Racing	Chevrolet	Grant County Mulch
10	Jennifer Jo Cobb	Jennifer Jo Cobb Racing	Chevrolet	Osage Contractors, Driven2Honor.org
12	Gus Dean (R)	Young's Motorsports	Chevrolet	LG Air Conditioning Technologies
13	Johnny Sauter	ThorSport Racing	Ford	Tenda Heal
16	Austin Hill	Hattori Racing Enterprises	Toyota	Chiba Toyopet
17	David Gilliland	DGR-Crosley	Toyota	Valvoline, Fred's
18	Harrison Burton (R)	Kyle Busch Motorsports	Toyota	Safelite Auto Glass
20	Spencer Boyd (R)	Young's Motorsports	Chevrolet	1A Auto Quality Parts & How-To Videos
22	Austin Wayne Self	AM Racing	Chevrolet	AM Technical Solutions, GO TEXAN.
24	Brett Moffitt	GMS Racing	Chevrolet	Plan B Sales
27	Myatt Snider	ThorSport Racing	Ford	Louisiana Hot Sauce
28	Bryan Dauzat	FDNY Racing	Chevrolet	FDNY, O. B. Builders Door & Trim
30	Brennan Poole (R)	On Point Motorsports	Toyota	Bad Boy Mowers
33	Josh Reaume	Reaume Brothers Racing	Chevrolet	TheChallengesBook.com
34	Jason White	Reaume Brothers Racing	Chevrolet	Powder Ventures Excavations, YourGMCTruckStore.com
42	Robby Lyons	Chad Finley Racing	Chevrolet	Sunwest Construction
44	Timothy Peters	Niece Motorsports	Chevrolet	Friends of Jaclyn Foundation
45	Ross Chastain (i)	Niece Motorsports	Chevrolet	TruNorth, Paul Jr. Designs
47	Chris Fontaine	Glenden Enterprises	Toyota	Glenden Enterprises
49	Ray Ciccarelli	CMI Motorsports	Chevrolet	Ciccarelli Moving & Installation
51	Christian Eckes	Kyle Busch Motorsports	Toyota	SiriusXM
52	Stewart Friesen	Halmar Friesen Racing	Chevrolet	Halmar
54	Natalie Decker (R)	DGR-Crosley	Toyota	N29 Technologies
63	Bobby Gerhart	Copp Motorsports	Chevrolet	Lucas Oil
68	Clay Greenfield	Clay Greenfield Motorsports	Chevrolet	Rackley Roofing
82	Spencer Davis	Rette Jones Racing	Ford	All Pro, Tower Sealants
87	Joe Nemechek	NEMCO Motorsports	Chevrolet	D. A. B. Constructors, Inc.
88	Matt Crafton	ThorSport Racing	Ford	Menards, Ideal Door Garage Doors
92	Austin Theriault	RBR Enterprises	Ford	Black's Tire, BTS Tire & Wheel Distributors
98	Grant Enfinger	ThorSport Racing	Ford	Champion Power Equipment "Powering Your Life"
99	Ben Rhodes	ThorSport Racing	Ford	The Carolina Nut Co.

== Practice ==
=== First practice ===
Clay Greenfield was the fastest in the first practice session with a time of 47.014 seconds and a speed of 191.432 mph (308.080 km/h).

Pos	No.	Driver	Team	Manufacturer	Time	Speed
1	68	Clay Greenfield	Clay Greenfield Motorsports	Chevrolet	47.014	191.432
2	9	Codie Rohrbaugh	Grant County Mulch Racing	Chevrolet	47.211	190.634
3	92	Austin Theriault	RBR Enterprises	Ford	47.216	190.613

=== Final practice ===
Austin Hill was the fastest in the final practice session with a time of 46.646 seconds and a speed of 192.943 mph (310.512 km/h).

Pos	No.	Driver	Team	Manufacturer	Time	Speed
1	16	Austin Hill	Hattori Racing Enterprises	Toyota	46.646	192.943
2	51	Christian Eckes	Kyle Busch Motorsports	Toyota	46.647	192.938
3	4	Todd Gilliland	Kyle Busch Motorsports	Toyota	46.656	192.901

== Qualifying ==
Christian Eckes scored the pole for the race with a time of 49.287 seconds and a speed of 182.604 mph (293.873 km/h).

=== Qualifying results ===
Pos	No	Driver	Team	Manufacturer	R1	R2
1	51	Christian Eckes	Kyle Busch Motorsports	Toyota	49.313	49.287
2	17	David Gilliland	DGR-Crosley	Toyota	49.391	49.300
3	4	Todd Gilliland	Kyle Busch Motorsports	Toyota	49.526	49.536
4	18	Harrison Burton (R)	Kyle Busch Motorsports	Toyota	49.460	49.626
5	98	Grant Enfinger	ThorSport Racing	Ford	49.700	49.628
6	2	Sheldon Creed (R)	GMS Racing	Chevrolet	49.663	49.719
7	52	Stewart Friesen	Halmar Friesen Racing	Chevrolet	49.827	49.762
8	24	Brett Moffitt	GMS Racing	Chevrolet	49.760	49.806
9	68	Clay Greenfield	Clay Greenfield Motorsports	Chevrolet	49.921	49.813
10	16	Austin Hill	Hattori Racing Enterprises	Toyota	49.710	49.865
11	54	Natalie Decker (R)	DGR-Crosley	Toyota	49.789	49.927
12	22	Austin Wayne Self	AM Racing	Chevrolet	49.967	50.170
13	12	Gus Dean (R)	Young's Motorsports	Chevrolet	49.998	—
14	20	Spencer Boyd (R)	Young's Motorsports	Chevrolet	49.999	—
15	88	Matt Crafton	ThorSport Racing	Ford	50.009	—
16	47	Chris Fontaine	Glenden Enterprises	Toyota	50.093	—
17	13	Johnny Sauter	ThorSport Racing	Ford	50.145	—
18	02	Tyler Dippel (R)	Young's Motorsports	Chevrolet	50.254	—
19	87	Joe Nemechek	NEMCO Motorsports	Chevrolet	50.303	—
20	42	Robby Lyons	Chad Finley Racing	Chevrolet	50.343	—
21	28	Bryan Dauzat	FDNY Racing	Chevrolet	50.348	—
22	99	Ben Rhodes	ThorSport Racing	Ford	50.363	—
23	45	Ross Chastain (i)	Niece Motorsports	Chevrolet	50.364	—
24	27	Myatt Snider	ThorSport Racing	Ford	50.371	—
25	04	Cory Roper	Roper Racing	Ford	50.400	—
26	30	Brennan Poole (R)	On Point Motorsports	Toyota	50.482	—
27	3	Jordan Anderson	Jordan Anderson Racing	Chevrolet	50.493	—
28	44	Timothy Peters	Niece Motorsports	Chevrolet	50.567	—
29	63	Bobby Gerhart	Copp Motorsports	Chevrolet	50.707	—
30	8	Angela Ruch	NEMCO Motorsports	Chevrolet	50.757	—
31	49	Ray Ciccarelli	CMI Motorsports	Chevrolet	51.885	—
32	33	Josh Reaume	Reaume Brothers Racing	Chevrolet	52.414	—
Did not qualify
33	92	Austin Theriault	RBR Enterprises	Ford	50.525	—
34	7	Korbin Forrister	All Out Motorsports	Toyota	50.573	—
35	10	Jennifer Jo Cobb	Jennifer Jo Cobb Racing	Chevrolet	50.611	—
36	9	Codie Rohrbaugh	Grant County Mulch Racing	Chevrolet	50.669	—
37	82	Spencer Davis	Rette Jones Racing	Ford	50.702	—
38	6	Norm Benning	Norm Benning Racing	Chevrolet	51.752	—
39	34	Jason White	Reaume Brothers Racing	Chevrolet	52.411	—

== Race ==
=== Race results ===
==== Stage Results ====
Stage One Laps: 25

Pos	No	Driver	Team	Manufacturer	Points
1	2	Sheldon Creed (R)	GMS Racing	Chevrolet	10
2	16	Austin Hill	Hattori Racing Enterprises	Toyota	9
3	51	Christian Eckes	Kyle Busch Motorsports	Toyota	8
4	24	Brett Moffitt	GMS Racing	Chevrolet	7
5	98	Grant Enfinger	ThorSport Racing	Ford	6
6	22	Austin Wayne Self	AM Racing	Chevrolet	5
7	68	Clay Greenfield	Clay Greenfield Motorsports	Chevrolet	4
8	27	Myatt Snider	ThorSport Racing	Ford	3
9	30	Brennan Poole (R)	On Point Motorsports	Toyota	2
10	4	Todd Gilliland	Kyle Busch Motorsports	Toyota	1

Stage Two Laps: 25

Pos	No	Driver	Team	Manufacturer	Points
1	13	Johnny Sauter	ThorSport Racing	Ford	10
2	52	Stewart Friesen	Halmar Friesen Racing	Chevrolet	9
3	99	Ben Rhodes	ThorSport Racing	Ford	8
4	17	David Gilliland	DGR-Crosley	Toyota	7
5	20	Spencer Boyd (R)	Young’s Motorsports	Chevrolet	6
6	98	Grant Enfinger	ThorSport Racing	Ford	5
7	27	Myatt Snider	ThorSport Racing	Ford	4
8	4	Todd Gilliland	Kyle Busch Motorsports	Toyota	3
9	18	Harrison Burton (R)	Kyle Busch Motorsports	Toyota	2
10	22	Austin Wayne Self	AM Racing	Chevrolet	1

=== Final Stage Results ===
Laps: 61

Pos	Grid	No	Driver	Team	Manufacturer	Laps	Points
1	10	16	Austin Hill	Hattori Racing Enterprises	Toyota	111	49
2	5	98	Grant Enfinger	ThorSport Racing	Ford	111	46
3	23	45	Ross Chastain (i)	Niece Motorsports	Chevrolet	111	0
4	14	20	Spencer Boyd (R)	Young's Motorsports	Chevrolet	111	39
5	15	88	Matt Crafton	ThorSport Racing	Ford	111	32
6	32	33	Josh Reaume	Reaume Brothers Racing	Chevrolet	111	31
7	28	44	Timothy Peters	Niece Motorsports	Chevrolet	111	30
8	30	8	Angela Ruch	NEMCO Motorsports	Chevrolet	111	29
9	12	22	Austin Wayne Self	AM Racing	Chevrolet	111	34
10	7	52	Stewart Friesen	Halmar Friesen Racing	Chevrolet	108	36
11	29	63	Bobby Gerhart	Copp Motorsports	Chevrolet	105	26
12	9	68	Clay Greenfield	Clay Greenfield Motorsports	Chevrolet	103	29
13	2	17	David Gilliland	DGR-Crosley	Toyota	100	31
14	22	99	Ben Rhodes	ThorSport Racing	Ford	98	31
15	13	12	Gus Dean (R)	Young's Motorsports	Chevrolet	98	22
16	19	87	Joe Nemechek	NEMCO Motorsports	Chevrolet	98	21
17	6	2	Sheldon Creed (R)	GMS Racing	Chevrolet	98	30
18	4	18	Harrison Burton (R)	Kyle Busch Motorsports	Toyota	89	21
19	3	4	Todd Gilliland	Kyle Busch Motorsports	Toyota	88	22
20	25	04	Cory Roper	Roper Racing	Ford	76	17
21	24	27	Myatt Snider	ThorSport Racing	Ford	62	23
22	1	51	Christian Eckes	Kyle Busch Motorsports	Toyota	61	23
23	17	13	Johnny Sauter	ThorSport Racing	Ford	60	24
24	26	30	Brennan Poole (R)	On Point Motorsports	Toyota	55	15
25	27	3	Jordan Anderson	Jordan Anderson Racing	Chevrolet	53	12
26	8	24	Brett Moffitt	GMS Racing	Chevrolet	53	18
27	16	47	Chris Fontaine	Glenden Enterprises	Toyota	27	10
28	31	49	Ray Ciccarelli	CMI Motorsports	Chevrolet	27	9
29	18	02	Tyler Dippel (R)	Young's Motorsports	Chevrolet	23	8
30	20	42	Robby Lyons	Chad Finley Racing	Chevrolet	16	7
31	21	28	Bryan Dauzat	FDNY Racing	Chevrolet	2	6
32	11	54	Natalie Decker (R)	DGR-Crosley	Toyota	1	5

Previous race: 2018 Ford EcoBoost 200	NASCAR Gander Outdoors Truck Series; 2019 season	Next race: 2019 Ultimate Tailgating 200
