= 2019 Digital Ally 250 =

Race details
- Race 7 of 23 in the 2019 NASCAR Gander Outdoors Truck Series season
- Date: May 10, 2019
- Location: Kansas Speedway in Kansas City, Kansas
- Course: Permanent racing facility
- Course length: 2.4 km (1.5 miles)
- Distance: 167 laps, 250 mi (403 km)

Pole position
Driver	Matt Crafton	ThorSport Racing
- Time: 30.459

Most laps led
Driver	Stewart Friesen	Halmar Friesen Racing
- Laps: 87

Winner
No. 45	Ross Chastain	Niece Motorsports

Television in the United States
- Network: FS1

Radio in the United States
- Radio: MRN

The 2019 Digital Ally 250 was a NASCAR Gander Outdoors Truck Series race held on May 10, 2019, at Kansas Speedway in Kansas City, Kansas. Contested over 167 laps on the 1.5 miles (2.4 km) asphalt speedway, it was the seventh race of the 2019 NASCAR Gander Outdoors Truck Series season.

== Background ==
=== Track ===
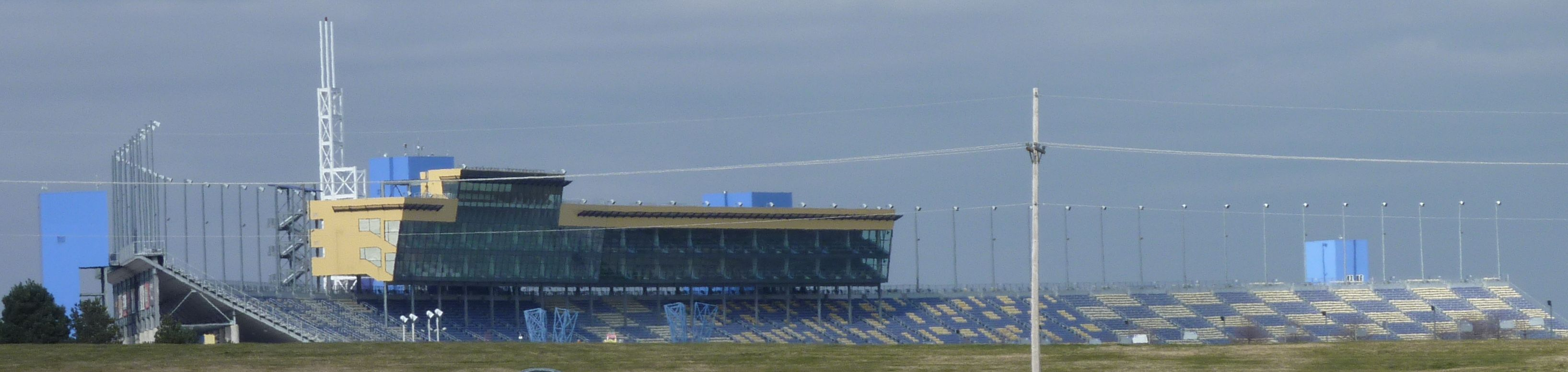
Kansas Speedway, the track where the race was held.

Kansas Speedway is a 1.5-mile (2.4 km) tri-oval race track in Kansas City, Kansas. It was built in 2001 and it currently hosts two annual NASCAR race weekends. The IndyCar Series also held races at the venue until 2011. The speedway is owned and operated by the International Speedway Corporation.

== Entry list ==
No.	Driver	Team	Manufacturer
0	Joey Gase (i)	Jennifer Jo Cobb Racing	Chevrolet
1	Bayley Currey	Vizion Motorsports	Toyota
02	Tyler Dippel (R)	Young's Motorsports	Chevrolet
2	Sheldon Creed (R)	GMS Racing	Chevrolet
3	Jordan Anderson	Jordan Anderson Racing	Chevrolet
4	Todd Gilliland	Kyle Busch Motorsports	Toyota
6	Norm Benning	Norm Benning Racing	Chevrolet
8	Joe Nemechek	NEMCO Motorsports	Chevrolet
10	Jennifer Jo Cobb	Jennifer Jo Cobb Racing	Chevrolet
12	Gus Dean (R)	Young's Motorsports	Chevrolet
13	Johnny Sauter	ThorSport Racing	Ford
16	Austin Hill	Hattori Racing Enterprises	Toyota
17	Tyler Ankrum (R)	DGR-Crosley	Toyota
18	Harrison Burton (R)	Kyle Busch Motorsports	Toyota
20	Spencer Boyd (R)	Young's Motorsports	Chevrolet
22	Austin Wayne Self	AM Racing	Chevrolet
24	Brett Moffitt	GMS Racing	Chevrolet
33	Josh Reaume	Reaume Brothers Racing	Toyota
34	Josh Bilicki (i)	Reaume Brothers Racing	Chevrolet
38	T. J. Bell	Niece Motorsports	Chevrolet
44	Angela Ruch	Niece Motorsports	Chevrolet
45	Ross Chastain (i)	Niece Motorsports	Chevrolet
46	Riley Herbst (i)	Kyle Busch Motorsports	Toyota
51	Brandon Jones (i)	Kyle Busch Motorsports	Toyota
52	Stewart Friesen	Halmar Friesen Racing	Chevrolet
54	Natalie Decker (R)	DGR-Crosley	Toyota
87	Timmy Hill (i)	NEMCO Motorsports	Chevrolet
88	Matt Crafton	ThorSport Racing	Ford
98	Grant Enfinger	ThorSport Racing	Ford
99	Ben Rhodes	ThorSport Racing	Ford

== Practice ==
=== First practice ===
Stewart Friesen was the fastest in the first practice session with a time of 30.408 seconds and a speed of 177.585 mph (285.795 km/h).

Pos	No.	Driver	Team	Manufacturer	Time	Speed
1	52	Stewart Friesen	Halmar Friesen Racing	Chevrolet	30.408	177.585
2	24	Brett Moffitt	GMS Racing	Chevrolet	30.420	177.515
3	88	Matt Crafton	ThorSport Racing	Ford	30.437	177.416

=== Final practice ===
Stewart Friesen was the fastest in the final practice session with a time of 30.482 seconds and a speed of 177.154 mph (285.102 km/h).

Pos	No.	Driver	Team	Manufacturer	Time	Speed
1	52	Stewart Friesen	Halmar Friesen Racing	Chevrolet	30.482	177.154
2	24	Brett Moffitt	GMS Racing	Chevrolet	30.487	177.125
3	2	Sheldon Creed (R)	GMS Racing	Chevrolet	30.625	176.327

== Qualifying ==
Matt Crafton scored the pole for the race with a time of 30.459 seconds and a speed of 177.288 mph (285.317 km/h).

=== Qualifying results ===
Pos	No	Driver	Team	Manufacturer	Time
1	88	Matt Crafton	ThorSport Racing	Ford	30.459
2	17	Tyler Ankrum (R)	DGR-Crosley	Toyota	30.472
3	18	Harrison Burton (R)	Kyle Busch Motorsports	Toyota	30.487
4	24	Brett Moffitt	GMS Racing	Chevrolet	30.510
5	4	Todd Gilliland	Kyle Busch Motorsports	Toyota	30.543
6	45	Ross Chastain (i)	Niece Motorsports	Chevrolet	30.570
7	16	Austin Hill	Hattori Racing Enterprises	Toyota	30.597
8	12	Gus Dean (R)	Young's Motorsports	Chevrolet	30.622
9	2	Sheldon Creed (R)	GMS Racing	Chevrolet	30.623
10	52	Stewart Friesen	Halmar Friesen Racing	Chevrolet	30.632
11	46	Riley Herbst (i)	Kyle Busch Motorsports	Toyota	30.632
12	13	Johnny Sauter	ThorSport Racing	Ford	30.729
13	98	Grant Enfinger	ThorSport Racing	Ford	30.742
14	99	Ben Rhodes	ThorSport Racing	Ford	30.766
15	54	Natalie Decker (R)	DGR-Crosley	Toyota	30.814
16	3	Jordan Anderson	Jordan Anderson Racing	Chevrolet	31.157
17	02	Tyler Dippel (R)	Young's Motorsports	Chevrolet	31.271
18	20	Spencer Boyd (R)	Young's Motorsports	Chevrolet	31.373
19	22	Austin Wayne Self	AM Racing	Chevrolet	31.554
20	8	Joe Nemechek	NEMCO Motorsports	Chevrolet	31.568
21	51	Brandon Jones (i)	Kyle Busch Motorsports	Toyota	31.622
22	87	Timmy Hill (i)	NEMCO Motorsports	Chevrolet	31.705
23	44	Angela Ruch	Niece Motorsports	Chevrolet	31.717
24	38	T. J. Bell	Niece Motorsports	Chevrolet	32.400
25	34	Josh Bilicki (i)	Reaume Brothers Racing	Chevrolet	32.500
26	33	Josh Reaume	Reaume Brothers Racing	Toyota	32.555
27	0	Joey Gase (i)	Jennifer Jo Cobb Racing	Chevrolet	32.633
28	6	Norm Benning	Norm Benning Racing	Chevrolet	33.322
29	10	Jennifer Jo Cobb	Jennifer Jo Cobb Racing	Chevrolet	0.000
30	1	Bayley Currey	Vizion Motorsports	Toyota	0.000

- After qualifying the cars, Jennifer Jo Cobb and Joey Gase swapped rides.

== Race ==
=== Stage Results ===
Stage One Laps: 40

Pos	No	Driver	Team	Manufacturer	Points
1	52	Stewart Friesen	Halmar Friesen Racing	Chevrolet	10
2	24	Brett Moffitt	GMS Racing	Chevrolet	9
3	98	Grant Enfinger	ThorSport Racing	Ford	8
4	45	Ross Chastain (i)	Niece Motorsports	Chevrolet	0
5	16	Austin Hill	Hattori Racing Enterprises	Toyota	6
6	88	Matt Crafton	ThorSport Racing	Ford	5
7	4	Todd Gilliland	Kyle Busch Motorsports	Toyota	4
8	2	Sheldon Creed (R)	GMS Racing	Chevrolet	3
9	18	Harrison Burton (R)	Kyle Busch Motorsports	Toyota	2
10	17	Tyler Ankrum (R)	DGR-Crosley	Toyota	1

Stage Two Laps: 40

Pos	No	Driver	Team	Manufacturer	Points
1	52	Stewart Friesen	Halmar Friesen Racing	Chevrolet	10
2	24	Brett Moffitt	GMS Racing	Chevrolet	9
3	98	Grant Enfinger	ThorSport Racing	Ford	8
4	45	Ross Chastain (i)	Niece Motorsports	Chevrolet	0
5	2	Sheldon Creed (R)	GMS Racing	Chevrolet	6
6	88	Matt Crafton	ThorSport Racing	Ford	5
7	4	Todd Gilliland	Kyle Busch Motorsports	Toyota	4
8	16	Austin Hill	Hattori Racing Enterprises	Toyota	3
9	17	Tyler Ankrum (R)	DGR-Crosley	Toyota	2
10	99	Ben Rhodes	ThorSport Racing	Ford	1

=== Final Stage Results ===
Stage Three Laps: 87

Pos	Grid	No	Driver	Team	Manufacturer	Laps	Points
1	6	45	Ross Chastain (i)	Niece Motorsports	Chevrolet	167	0
2	14	99	Ben Rhodes	ThorSport Racing	Ford	167	36
3	5	4	Todd Gilliland	Kyle Busch Motorsports	Toyota	167	42
4	7	16	Austin Hill	Hattori Racing Enterprises	Toyota	167	42
5	21	51	Brandon Jones (i)	Kyle Busch Motorsports	Toyota	167	0
6	1	88	Matt Crafton	ThorSport Racing	Ford	167	41
7	13	98	Grant Enfinger	ThorSport Racing	Ford	167	46
8	4	24	Brett Moffitt	GMS Racing	Chevrolet	167	47
9	11	46	Riley Herbst (i)	Kyle Busch Motorsports	Toyota	167	0
10	3	18	Harrison Burton (R)	Kyle Busch Motorsports	Toyota	167	29
11	2	17	Tyler Ankrum (R)	DGR-Crosley	Toyota	167	29
12	17	02	Tyler Dippel (R)	Young's Motorsports	Chevrolet	166	25
13	16	3	Jordan Anderson	Jordan Anderson Racing	Chevrolet	166	24
14	8	12	Gus Dean (R)	Young's Motorsports	Chevrolet	166	23
15	10	52	Stewart Friesen	Halmar Friesen Racing	Chevrolet	166	42
16	23	44	Angela Ruch	Niece Motorsports	Chevrolet	163	21
17	18	20	Spencer Boyd (R)	Young's Motorsports	Chevrolet	162	20
18	25	34	Josh Bilicki (i)	Reaume Brothers Racing	Chevrolet	160	0
19	9	2	Sheldon Creed (R)	GMS Racing	Chevrolet	158	27
20	26	33	Josh Reaume	Reaume Brothers Racing	Toyota	135	17
21	28	6	Norm Benning	Norm Benning Racing	Chevrolet	109	16
22	12	13	Johnny Sauter	ThorSport Racing	Ford	97	15
23	27	0	Jennifer Jo Cobb	Jennifer Jo Cobb Racing	Chevrolet	93	14
24	20	8	Joe Nemechek	NEMCO Motorsports	Chevrolet	59	13
25	15	54	Natalie Decker (R)	DGR-Crosley	Toyota	51	12
26	24	38	T. J. Bell	Niece Motorsports	Chevrolet	44	11
27	19	22	Austin Wayne Self	AM Racing	Chevrolet	26	10
28	22	87	Timmy Hill (i)	NEMCO Motorsports	Chevrolet	8	0
29	30	1	Bayley Currey	Vizion Motorsports	Toyota	4	8
30	29	10	Joey Gase (i)	Jennifer Jo Cobb Racing	Chevrolet	0	0

Previous race: 2019 JEGS 200	NASCAR Gander Outdoors Truck Series; 2019 season	Next race: 2019 North Carolina Education Lottery 200
