= 2019 Ultimate Tailgating 200 =

Race details
- Race 2 of 23 in the 2019 NASCAR Gander Outdoors Truck Series season
- Date: February 23, 2019
- Location: Atlanta Motor Speedway in Hampton, Georgia
- Course: Permanent racing facility
- Course length: 1.54 miles (2.478 km)
- Distance: 130 laps, 200.2 mi (322.191 km)
- Average speed: 112.648 miles per hour (181.289 km/h)

Pole position
Driver	Austin Hill	Hattori Racing Enterprises

Most laps led
Driver	Kyle Busch	Kyle Busch Motorsports
- Laps: 92

Winner
No. 51	Kyle Busch	Kyle Busch Motorsports

Television in the United States
- Network: FS1

Radio in the United States
- Radio: MRN

The 2019 Ultimate Tailgating 200 was a NASCAR Gander Outdoors Truck Series race held on February 23, 2019, at Atlanta Motor Speedway in Hampton, Georgia. Contested over 130 laps on the 1.54-mile (2.48-kilometre) asphalt quad-oval intermediate speedway, it was the second race of the 2019 NASCAR Gander Outdoors Truck Series season.

Driving for his eponymous Kyle Busch Motorsports team and having led 92 of the race's 130 laps, Kyle Busch took the victory ahead of ThorSport Racing pair Johnny Sauter and Grant Enfinger.

== Entry list ==
No.	Driver	Team	Manufacturer
02	Tyler Dippel (R)	Young's Motorsports	Chevrolet
2	Sheldon Creed (R)	GMS Racing	Chevrolet
3	Jordan Anderson	Jordan Anderson Racing	Chevrolet
04	Cory Roper	Roper Racing	Ford
4	Todd Gilliland	Kyle Busch Motorsports	Toyota
6	Norm Benning	Norm Benning Racing	Chevrolet
7	Korbin Forrister	All Out Motorsports	Toyota
8	Joe Nemechek	NEMCO Motorsports	Chevrolet
10	Jennifer Jo Cobb	Jennifer Jo Cobb Racing	Chevrolet
12	Gus Dean (R)	Young's Motorsports	Chevrolet
13	Johnny Sauter	ThorSport Racing	Ford
16	Austin Hill	Hattori Racing Enterprises	Toyota
17	Anthony Alfredo (R)	DGR-Crosley	Toyota
18	Harrison Burton (R)	Kyle Busch Motorsports	Toyota
20	Spencer Boyd (R)	Young's Motorsports	Chevrolet
22	Austin Wayne Self	AM Racing	Chevrolet
24	Brett Moffitt	GMS Racing	Chevrolet
30	Brennan Poole (R)	On Point Motorsports	Toyota
33	Josh Reaume	Reaume Brothers Racing	Toyota
42	Chad Finley	Chad Finley Racing	Chevrolet
44	Timothy Peters	Niece Motorsports	Chevrolet
45	Ross Chastain (i)	Niece Motorsports	Chevrolet
49	Ray Ciccarelli	CMI Motorsports	Chevrolet
51	Kyle Busch (i)	Kyle Busch Motorsports	Toyota
52	Stewart Friesen	Halmar Friesen Racing	Chevrolet
54	Natalie Decker (R)	DGR-Crosley	Toyota
63	Timmy Hill (i)	Copp Motorsports	Chevrolet
75	Parker Kligerman	Henderson Motorsports	Chevrolet
80	B. J. McLeod (i)	Jacob Wallace Racing	Ford
88	Matt Crafton	ThorSport Racing	Ford
97	Jesse Little	JJL Motorsports	Ford
98	Grant Enfinger	ThorSport Racing	Ford
99	Ben Rhodes	ThorSport Racing	Ford

== Practice ==
=== First practice ===
Stewart Friesen was the fastest in the first practice session with a time of 31.286 seconds and a speed of 177.204 mph (285.182 km/h).

Pos	No.	Driver	Team	Manufacturer	Time	Speed
1	52	Stewart Friesen	Halmar Friesen Racing	Chevrolet	31.286	177.204
2	2	Sheldon Creed (R)	GMS Racing	Chevrolet	31.344	176.876
3	88	Matt Crafton	ThorSport Racing	Ford	31.450	176.280

=== Final practice ===
Ben Rhodes was the fastest in the final practice session with a time of 31.194 seconds and a speed of 177.726 mph (286.022 km/h).

Pos	No.	Driver	Team	Manufacturer	Time	Speed
1	99	Ben Rhodes	ThorSport Racing	Ford	31.194	177.726
2	2	Sheldon Creed (R)	GMS Racing	Chevrolet	31.263	177.334
3	51	Kyle Busch (i)	Kyle Busch Motorsports	Toyota	31.267	177.312

== Qualifying ==
Qualifying was canceled due to rain. Austin Hill was awarded the pole for the race based on 2018 owner's points.

=== Qualifying results ===
Pos	No	Driver	Team	Manufacturer	Time
1	16	Austin Hill	Hattori Racing Enterprises	Toyota	0.000
2	18	Harrison Burton (R)	Kyle Busch Motorsports	Toyota	0.000
3	24	Brett Moffitt	GMS Racing	Chevrolet	0.000
4	2	Sheldon Creed (R)	GMS Racing	Chevrolet	0.000
5	98	Grant Enfinger	ThorSport Racing	Ford	0.000
6	99	Ben Rhodes	ThorSport Racing	Ford	0.000
7	51	Kyle Busch (i)	Kyle Busch Motorsports	Toyota	0.000
8	8	Joe Nemechek	NEMCO Motorsports	Chevrolet	0.000
9	52	Stewart Friesen	Halmar Friesen Racing	Chevrolet	0.000
10	88	Matt Crafton	ThorSport Racing	Ford	0.000
11	4	Todd Gilliland	Kyle Busch Motorsports	Toyota	0.000
12	13	Johnny Sauter	ThorSport Racing	Ford	0.000
13	33	Josh Reaume	Reaume Brothers Racing	Toyota	0.000
14	44	Timothy Peters	Niece Motorsports	Chevrolet	0.000
15	02	Tyler Dippel (R)	Young's Motorsports	Chevrolet	0.000
16	54	Natalie Decker (R)	DGR-Crosley	Toyota	0.000
17	22	Austin Wayne Self	AM Racing	Chevrolet	0.000
18	20	Spencer Boyd (R)	Young's Motorsports	Chevrolet	0.000
19	49	Ray Ciccarelli	CMI Motorsports	Chevrolet	0.000
20	3	Jordan Anderson	Jordan Anderson Racing	Chevrolet	0.000
21	45	Ross Chastain (i)	Niece Motorsports	Chevrolet	0.000
22	12	Gus Dean (R)	Young's Motorsports	Chevrolet	0.000
23	97	Jesse Little	JJL Motorsports	Ford	0.000
24	63	Timmy Hill (i)	Copp Motorsports	Chevrolet	0.000
25	10	Jennifer Jo Cobb	Jennifer Jo Cobb Racing	Chevrolet	0.000
26	75	Parker Kligerman	Henderson Motorsports	Chevrolet	0.000
27	17	Anthony Alfredo (R)	DGR-Crosley	Toyota	0.000
28	04	Cory Roper	Roper Racing	Ford	0.000
29	30	Brennan Poole (R)	On Point Motorsports	Toyota	0.000
30	42	Chad Finley	Chad Finley Racing	Chevrolet	0.000
31	7	Korbin Forrister	All Out Motorsports	Toyota	0.000
32	6	Norm Benning	Norm Benning Racing	Chevrolet	0.000
Did not qualify
33	80	B. J. McLeod (i)	Jacob Wallace Racing	Ford	0.000

== Race ==
=== Stage results ===
Stage One Laps: 40

Pos	No	Driver	Team	Manufacturer	Points
1	51	Kyle Busch (i)	Kyle Busch Motorsports	Toyota	0
2	18	Harrison Burton (R)	Kyle Busch Motorsports	Toyota	9
3	98	Grant Enfinger	ThorSport Racing	Ford	8
4	13	Johnny Sauter	ThorSport Racing	Ford	7
5	16	Austin Hill	Hattori Racing Enterprises	Toyota	6
6	99	Ben Rhodes	ThorSport Racing	Ford	5
7	4	Todd Gilliland	Kyle Busch Motorsports	Toyota	4
8	88	Matt Crafton	ThorSport Racing	Ford	3
9	52	Stewart Friesen	Halmar Friesen Racing	Chevrolet	2
10	45	Ross Chastain (i)	Niece Motorsports	Chevrolet	0

Stage Two Laps: 40

Pos	No	Driver	Team	Manufacturer	Points
1	51	Kyle Busch (i)	Kyle Busch Motorsports	Toyota	0
2	99	Ben Rhodes	ThorSport Racing	Ford	9
3	18	Harrison Burton (R)	Kyle Busch Motorsports	Toyota	8
4	13	Johnny Sauter	ThorSport Racing	Ford	7
5	24	Brett Moffitt	GMS Racing	Chevrolet	6
6	16	Austin Hill	Hattori Racing Enterprises	Toyota	5
7	45	Ross Chastain (i)	Niece Motorsports	Chevrolet	0
8	98	Grant Enfinger	ThorSport Racing	Ford	3
9	88	Matt Crafton	ThorSport Racing	Ford	2
10	2	Sheldon Creed (R)	GMS Racing	Chevrolet	1

=== Final stage results ===
Stage Three Laps: 50

Pos	Grid	No	Driver	Team	Manufacturer	Laps	Points
1	7	51	Kyle Busch (i)	Kyle Busch Motorsports	Toyota	130	0
2	12	13	Johnny Sauter	ThorSport Racing	Ford	130	49
3	5	98	Grant Enfinger	ThorSport Racing	Ford	130	45
4	3	24	Brett Moffitt	GMS Racing	Chevrolet	130	39
5	6	99	Ben Rhodes	ThorSport Racing	Ford	130	46
6	21	45	Ross Chastain (i)	Niece Motorsports	Chevrolet	130	0
7	1	16	Austin Hill	Hattori Racing Enterprises	Toyota	130	41
8	2	18	Harrison Burton (R)	Kyle Busch Motorsports	Toyota	130	46
9	11	4	Todd Gilliland	Kyle Busch Motorsports	Toyota	130	32
10	14	44	Timothy Peters	Niece Motorsports	Chevrolet	130	27
11	15	02	Tyler Dippel (R)	Young's Motorsports	Chevrolet	130	26
12	4	2	Sheldon Creed (R)	GMS Racing	Chevrolet	130	26
13	29	30	Brennan Poole (R)	On Point Motorsports	Toyota	130	24
14	10	88	Matt Crafton	ThorSport Racing	Ford	130	28
15	22	12	Gus Dean (R)	Young's Motorsports	Chevrolet	130	22
16	28	04	Cory Roper	Roper Racing	Ford	130	21
17	27	17	Anthony Alfredo (R)	DGR-Crosley	Toyota	130	20
18	9	52	Stewart Friesen	Halmar Friesen Racing	Chevrolet	130	21
19	20	3	Jordan Anderson	Jordan Anderson Racing	Chevrolet	130	18
20	26	75	Parker Kligerman	Henderson Motorsports	Chevrolet	130	17
21	31	7	Korbin Forrister	All Out Motorsports	Toyota	130	16
22	25	10	Jennifer Jo Cobb	Jennifer Jo Cobb Racing	Chevrolet	130	15
23	23	97	Jesse Little	JJL Motorsports	Ford	130	14
24	16	54	Natalie Decker (R)	DGR-Crosley	Toyota	127	13
25	18	20	Spencer Boyd (R)	Young's Motorsports	Chevrolet	126	12
26	19	49	Ray Ciccarelli	CMI Motorsports	Chevrolet	125	11
27	17	22	Austin Wayne Self	AM Racing	Chevrolet	118	10
28	30	42	Chad Finley	Chad Finley Racing	Chevrolet	117	9
29	32	6	Norm Benning	Norm Benning Racing	Chevrolet	82	8
30	13	33	Josh Reaume	Reaume Brothers Racing	Toyota	78	7
31	24	63	Timmy Hill (i)	Copp Motorsports	Chevrolet	53	0
32	8	8	Joe Nemechek	NEMCO Motorsports	Chevrolet	50	5

Previous race: 2019 NextEra Energy 250	NASCAR Gander Outdoors Truck Series; 2019 season	Next race: 2019 Strat 200
