= 2019 Vankor 350 =

Race details
- Race 5 of 23 in the 2019 NASCAR Gander Outdoors Truck Series season
- Date: March 29, 2019
- Location: Texas Motor Speedway in Fort Worth, Texas
- Course: Permanent racing facility
- Course length: 1.5 miles (2.414 km)
- Distance: 147 laps, 220.5 mi (354.860 km)

Pole position
Driver	Grant Enfinger	ThorSport Racing
- Time: 28.823

Most laps led
Driver	Kyle Busch	Kyle Busch Motorsports
- Laps: 97

Winner
No. 51	Kyle Busch	Kyle Busch Motorsports

Television in the United States
- Network: FS1

Radio in the United States
- Radio: MRN

The 2019 Vankor 350 was a NASCAR Gander Outdoors Truck Series race held on March 29, 2019, at Texas Motor Speedway in Fort Worth, Texas. Contested over 147 laps on the 1.5-mile (2.4-kilometre) intermediate quad-oval, it was the 5th race of the 2019 NASCAR Gander Outdoors Truck Series season.

Kyle Busch Motorsports driver Kyle Busch took his 4th victory in as many starts in 2019, leading 97 of the 147 laps on his way to the win ahead of Stewart Friesen (Halmar Friesen Racing) and Johnny Sauter (ThorSport Racing).

== Entry list ==
No.	Driver	Team	Manufacturer
1	Bayley Currey	Vizion Motorsports	Toyota
02	Tyler Dippel (R)	Young's Motorsports	Chevrolet
2	Sheldon Creed (R)	GMS Racing	Chevrolet
3	Jordan Anderson	Jordan Anderson Racing	Chevrolet
04	Cory Roper	Roper Racing	Ford
4	Todd Gilliland	Kyle Busch Motorsports	Toyota
6	Norm Benning	Norm Benning Racing	Chevrolet
7	Korbin Forrister	All Out Motorsports	Toyota
8	Joe Nemechek	NEMCO Motorsports	Chevrolet
9	Codie Rohrbaugh	Grant County Mulch Racing	Chevrolet
10	Jennifer Jo Cobb	Jennifer Jo Cobb Racing	Chevrolet
12	Gus Dean (R)	Young's Motorsports	Chevrolet
13	Johnny Sauter	ThorSport Racing	Ford
16	Austin Hill	Hattori Racing Enterprises	Toyota
17	Tyler Ankrum (R)	DGR-Crosley	Toyota
18	Harrison Burton (R)	Kyle Busch Motorsports	Toyota
20	Spencer Boyd (R)	Young's Motorsports	Chevrolet
22	Bubba Wallace (i)	AM Racing	Chevrolet
24	Brett Moffitt	GMS Racing	Chevrolet
30	Brennan Poole (R)	On Point Motorsports	Toyota
33	Josh Reaume	Reaume Brothers Racing	Chevrolet
34	Jesse Iwuji	Reaume Brothers Racing	Chevrolet
42	Garrett Smithley (i)	Chad Finley Racing	Chevrolet
44	Angela Ruch	Niece Motorsports	Chevrolet
45	Ross Chastain (i)	Niece Motorsports	Chevrolet
49	Ray Ciccarelli	CMI Motorsports	Chevrolet
51	Kyle Busch (i)	Kyle Busch Motorsports	Toyota
52	Stewart Friesen	Halmar Friesen Racing	Chevrolet
54	Anthony Alfredo	DGR-Crosley	Toyota
87	Timmy Hill (i)	NEMCO Motorsports	Chevrolet
88	Matt Crafton	ThorSport Racing	Ford
97	Jesse Little	JJL Motorsports	Ford
98	Grant Enfinger	ThorSport Racing	Ford
99	Ben Rhodes	ThorSport Racing	Ford

== Practice ==
=== First practice ===
Johnny Sauter was the fastest in the first practice session with a time of 29.098 seconds and a speed of 185.580 mph (298.662 km/h).

Pos	No.	Driver	Team	Manufacturer	Time	Speed
1	13	Johnny Sauter	ThorSport Racing	Ford	29.098	185.580
2	98	Grant Enfinger	ThorSport Racing	Ford	29.130	185.376
3	99	Ben Rhodes	ThorSport Racing	Ford	29.270	184.489

=== Final practice ===
Austin Hill was the fastest in the final practice session with a time of 29.061 seconds and a speed of 185.816 mph (299.042 km/h).

Pos	No.	Driver	Team	Manufacturer	Time	Speed
1	16	Austin Hill	Hattori Racing Enterprises	Toyota	29.061	185.816
2	24	Brett Moffitt	GMS Racing	Chevrolet	29.067	185.778
3	30	Brennan Poole (R)	On Point Motorsports	Toyota	29.118	185.452

== Qualifying ==
Grant Enfinger scored the pole for the race with a time of 28.823 seconds and a speed of 187.350 mph (301.511 km/h).

=== Qualifying results ===
Pos	No	Driver	Team	Manufacturer	R1	R2
1	98	Grant Enfinger	ThorSport Racing	Ford	28.949	28.823
2	24	Brett Moffitt	GMS Racing	Chevrolet	28.840	28.855
3	2	Sheldon Creed (R)	GMS Racing	Chevrolet	29.021	28.892
4	51	Kyle Busch (i)	Kyle Busch Motorsports	Toyota	29.057	28.902
5	16	Austin Hill	Hattori Racing Enterprises	Toyota	28.873	28.925
6	17	Tyler Ankrum (R)	DGR-Crosley	Toyota	29.027	28.941
7	13	Johnny Sauter	ThorSport Racing	Ford	28.897	28.948
8	99	Ben Rhodes	ThorSport Racing	Ford	29.101	28.969
9	52	Stewart Friesen	Halmar Friesen Racing	Chevrolet	28.985	28.990
10	18	Harrison Burton (R)	Kyle Busch Motorsports	Toyota	29.040	29.086
11	45	Ross Chastain (i)	Niece Motorsports	Chevrolet	29.055	29.111
12	88	Matt Crafton	ThorSport Racing	Ford	29.116	29.208
13	30	Brennan Poole (R)	On Point Motorsports	Toyota	29.123	—
14	54	Anthony Alfredo	DGR-Crosley	Toyota	29.135	—
15	22	Bubba Wallace (i)	AM Racing	Chevrolet	29.162	—
16	4	Todd Gilliland	Kyle Busch Motorsports	Toyota	29.175	—
17	8	Joe Nemechek	NEMCO Motorsports	Chevrolet	29.283	—
18	3	Jordan Anderson	Jordan Anderson Racing	Chevrolet	29.320	—
19	9	Codie Rohrbaugh	Grant County Mulch Racing	Chevrolet	29.571	—
20	97	Jesse Little	JJL Motorsports	Ford	29.615	—
21	20	Spencer Boyd (R)	Young's Motorsports	Chevrolet	29.720	—
22	87	Timmy Hill (i)	NEMCO Motorsports	Chevrolet	29.830	—
23	7	Korbin Forrister	All Out Motorsports	Toyota	29.835	—
24	02	Tyler Dippel (R)	Young's Motorsports	Chevrolet	29.894	—
25	42	Garrett Smithley (i)	Chad Finley Racing	Chevrolet	29.953	—
26	12	Gus Dean (R)	Young's Motorsports	Chevrolet	30.025	—
27	10	Jennifer Jo Cobb	Jennifer Jo Cobb Racing	Chevrolet	30.413	—
28	49	Ray Ciccarelli	CMI Motorsports	Chevrolet	30.490	—
29	04	Cory Roper	Roper Racing	Ford	30.602	—
30	34	Jesse Iwuji	Reaume Brothers Racing	Chevrolet	31.001	—
31	44	Angela Ruch	Niece Motorsports	Chevrolet	31.967	—
32	33	Josh Reaume	Reaume Brothers Racing	Chevrolet	40.708	—
Did not qualify
33	6	Norm Benning	Norm Benning Racing	Chevrolet	32.013	—
Withdrew
34	1	Bayley Currey (Note: Currey's truck caught fire during the first practice session, and the team withdrew before qualifying.)	Vizion Motorsports	Toyota	—	—

== Race ==
=== Stage results ===
Stage One Laps: 35

Pos	No	Driver	Team	Manufacturer	Points
1	98	Grant Enfinger	ThorSport Racing	Ford	10
2	99	Ben Rhodes	ThorSport Racing	Ford	9
3	52	Stewart Friesen	Halmar Friesen Racing	Chevrolet	8
4	2	Sheldon Creed (R)	GMS Racing	Chevrolet	7
5	16	Austin Hill	Hattori Racing Enterprises	Toyota	6
6	24	Brett Moffitt	GMS Racing	Chevrolet	5
7	17	Tyler Ankrum (R)	DGR-Crosley	Toyota	4
8	51	Kyle Busch (i)	Kyle Busch Motorsports	Toyota	0
9	13	Johnny Sauter	ThorSport Racing	Ford	2
10	3	Jordan Anderson	Jordan Anderson Racing	Chevrolet	1

Stage Two Laps: 35

Pos	No	Driver	Team	Manufacturer	Points
1	51	Kyle Busch (i)	Kyle Busch Motorsports	Toyota	0
2	88	Matt Crafton	ThorSport Racing	Ford	9
3	99	Ben Rhodes	ThorSport Racing	Ford	8
4	45	Ross Chastain (i)	Niece Motorsports	Chevrolet	0
5	52	Stewart Friesen	Halmar Friesen Racing	Chevrolet	6
6	24	Brett Moffitt	GMS Racing	Chevrolet	5
7	98	Grant Enfinger	ThorSport Racing	Ford	4
8	22	Bubba Wallace (i)	AM Racing	Chevrolet	0
9	30	Brennan Poole (R)	On Point Motorsports	Toyota	2
10	17	Tyler Ankrum (R)	DGR-Crosley	Toyota	1

=== Final stage results ===
Stage Three Laps: 77

Pos	Grid	No	Driver	Team	Manufacturer	Laps	Points
1	4	51	Kyle Busch (i)	Kyle Busch Motorsports	Toyota	147	0
2	9	52	Stewart Friesen	Halmar Friesen Racing	Chevrolet	147	49
3	7	13	Johnny Sauter	ThorSport Racing	Ford	147	36
4	1	98	Grant Enfinger	ThorSport Racing	Ford	147	47
5	12	88	Matt Crafton	ThorSport Racing	Ford	147	41
6	6	17	Tyler Ankrum (R)	DGR-Crosley	Toyota	147	36
7	11	45	Ross Chastain (i)	Niece Motorsports	Chevrolet	147	0
8	24	02	Tyler Dippel (R)	Young's Motorsports	Chevrolet	147	29
9	13	30	Brennan Poole (R)	On Point Motorsports	Toyota	147	30
10	8	99	Ben Rhodes	ThorSport Racing	Ford	147	44
11	21	20	Spencer Boyd (R)	Young's Motorsports	Chevrolet	147	26
12	29	04	Cory Roper	Roper Racing	Ford	147	25
13	20	97	Jesse Little	JJL Motorsports	Ford	147	24
14	16	4	Todd Gilliland	Kyle Busch Motorsports	Toyota	147	23
15	25	42	Garrett Smithley (i)	Chad Finley Racing	Chevrolet	147	0
16	28	49	Ray Ciccarelli	CMI Motorsports	Chevrolet	146	21
17	30	34	Jesse Iwuji	Reaume Brothers Racing	Chevrolet	146	20
18	27	10	Jennifer Jo Cobb	Jennifer Jo Cobb Racing	Chevrolet	145	19
19	2	24	Brett Moffitt	GMS Racing	Chevrolet	143	28
20	15	22	Bubba Wallace (i)	AM Racing	Chevrolet	141	0
21	18	3	Jordan Anderson	Jordan Anderson Racing	Chevrolet	140	17
22	3	2	Sheldon Creed (R)	GMS Racing	Chevrolet	133	22
23	19	9	Codie Rohrbaugh	Grant County Mulch Racing	Chevrolet	116	14
24	23	7	Korbin Forrister	All Out Motorsports	Toyota	101	13
25	17	8	Joe Nemechek	NEMCO Motorsports	Chevrolet	89	12
26	22	87	Timmy Hill (i)	NEMCO Motorsports	Chevrolet	75	0
27	5	16	Austin Hill	Hattori Racing Enterprises	Toyota	75	16
28	14	54	Anthony Alfredo (R)	DGR-Crosley	Toyota	48	9
29	26	12	Gus Dean (R)	Young's Motorsports	Chevrolet	28	8
30	31	44	Angela Ruch	Niece Motorsports	Chevrolet	18	7
31	10	18	Harrison Burton (R)	Kyle Busch Motorsports	Toyota	12	6
32	32	33	Josh Reaume	Reaume Brothers Racing	Chevrolet	0	5

== Notes ==
Previous race: 2019 TruNorth Global 250	NASCAR Gander Outdoors Truck Series; 2019 season	Next race: 2019 JEGS 200
