= 2020 NASCAR Hall of Fame 200 =

Race details
- Race 22 of 23 of the 2020 NASCAR Gander RV & Outdoors Truck Series
- Date: October 30, 2020
- Official name: NASCAR Hall of Fame 200
- Location: Martinsville, Virginia, Martinsville Speedway
- Course: Permanent racing facility
- Course length: 0.526 miles (0.847 km)
- Distance: 200 laps, 105.2 mi (169.302 km)
- Average speed: 52.403 miles per hour (84.334 km/h)

Pole position
Driver	Sheldon Creed	GMS Racing
- Grid positions set by competition-based formula

Most laps led
Driver	Sheldon Creed	GMS Racing
- Laps: 65

Winner
No. 98	Grant Enfinger	ThorSport Racing

Television in the United States
- Network: Fox Sports 1
- Announcers: Vince Welch, Michael Waltrip, and Kurt Busch

Radio in the United States
- Radio: Motor Racing Network

The 2020 NASCAR Hall of Fame 200 was the 22nd stock car race of the 2020 NASCAR Gander RV & Outdoors Truck Series season, the 18th iteration of the event, and the final, and therefore the cutoff race for the Round of 8. The race was held on Friday, October 30, 2020, in Martinsville, Virginia at Martinsville Speedway, a 0.526 miles (0.847 km) permanent oval-shaped short track. The race took the scheduled 200 laps to complete. After a wild restart with 2 to go, Grant Enfinger of ThorSport Racing would pull away to win his 4th and final NASCAR Gander RV & Outdoors Truck Series win of the season, and his 6th career win in the series. To fill out the podium, Ben Rhodes of ThorSport Racing and Zane Smith of GMS Racing would finish 2nd and 3rd, respectively.

== Background ==
The layout of Martinsville Speedway, the venue where the race was held.

Martinsville Speedway is a NASCAR-owned stock car racing track located in Henry County, in Ridgeway, Virginia, just to the south of Martinsville. At 0.526 miles (0.847 km) in length, it is the shortest track in the NASCAR Cup Series. The track was also one of the first paved oval tracks in NASCAR, being built in 1947 by H. Clay Earles. It is also the only remaining race track that has been on the NASCAR circuit from its beginning in 1948.

=== Entry list ===
#	Driver	Team	Make
00	B. J. McLeod*	Reaume Brothers Racing	Chevrolet
2	Sheldon Creed	GMS Racing	Chevrolet
02	Tate Fogleman	Young's Motorsports	Chevrolet
3	Jordan Anderson	Jordan Anderson Racing	Chevrolet
4	Raphaël Lessard	Kyle Busch Motorsports	Toyota
6	Norm Benning	Norm Benning Racing	Chevrolet
9	Codie Rohrbaugh	CR7 Motorsports	Chevrolet
10	Jennifer Jo Cobb	Jennifer Jo Cobb Racing	Chevrolet
11	Spencer Davis	Spencer Davis Motorsports	Toyota
13	Johnny Sauter	ThorSport Racing	Ford
15	Tanner Gray	DGR-Crosley	Ford
16	Austin Hill	Hattori Racing Enterprises	Toyota
18	Christian Eckes	Kyle Busch Motorsports	Toyota
19	Derek Kraus	McAnally–Hilgemann Racing	Toyota
20	Spencer Boyd	Young's Motorsports	Chevrolet
21	Zane Smith	GMS Racing	Chevrolet
22	Austin Wayne Self	AM Racing	Chevrolet
23	Brett Moffitt	GMS Racing	Chevrolet
24	Sam Mayer	GMS Racing	Chevrolet
26	Tyler Ankrum	GMS Racing	Chevrolet
30	Danny Bohn	On Point Motorsports	Toyota
33	Josh Reaume*	Reaume Brothers Racing	Toyota
38	Todd Gilliland	Front Row Motorsports	Ford
40	Ryan Truex	Niece Motorsports	Chevrolet
41	Dawson Cram	Cram Racing Enterprises	Chevrolet
42	Carson Hocevar	Niece Motorsports	Chevrolet
44	Natalie Decker	Niece Motorsports	Chevrolet
45	Trevor Bayne	Niece Motorsports	Chevrolet
49	Tim Viens**	CMI Motorsports	Chevrolet
51	Brandon Jones	Kyle Busch Motorsports	Toyota
52	Stewart Friesen	Halmar Friesen Racing	Toyota
56	Timmy Hill	Hill Motorsports	Chevrolet
68	Clay Greenfield	Clay Greenfield Motorsports	Toyota
75	Parker Kligerman	Henderson Motorsports	Chevrolet
83	Ray Ciccarelli	CMI Motorsports	Chevrolet
88	Matt Crafton	ThorSport Racing	Ford
98	Grant Enfinger	ThorSport Racing	Ford
99	Ben Rhodes	ThorSport Racing	Ford
Official entry list

== Starting lineup ==
The starting lineup was determined by a metric qualifying system based on the results and fastest lap of the last race, the 2020 SpeedyCash.com 400. As a result, Sheldon Creed of GMS Racing won the pole.

Pos.	#	Driver	Team	Make
1	2	Sheldon Creed	GMS Racing	Chevrolet
2	21	Zane Smith	GMS Racing	Chevrolet
3	16	Austin Hill	Hattori Racing Enterprises	Toyota
4	23	Brett Moffitt	GMS Racing	Chevrolet
5	88	Matt Crafton	ThorSport Racing	Ford
6	26	Tyler Ankrum	GMS Racing	Chevrolet
7	99	Ben Rhodes	ThorSport Racing	Ford
8	98	Grant Enfinger	ThorSport Racing	Ford
9	51	Brandon Jones	Kyle Busch Motorsports	Toyota
10	4	Raphaël Lessard	Kyle Busch Motorsports	Toyota
11	19	Derek Kraus	McAnally–Hilgemann Racing	Toyota
12	15	Tanner Gray	DGR-Crosley	Ford
13	22	Austin Wayne Self	AM Racing	Chevrolet
14	18	Christian Eckes	Kyle Busch Motorsports	Toyota
15	13	Johnny Sauter	ThorSport Racing	Ford
16	3	Jordan Anderson	Jordan Anderson Racing	Chevrolet
17	20	Spencer Boyd	Young's Motorsports	Chevrolet
18	52	Stewart Friesen	Halmar Friesen Racing	Toyota
19	30	Danny Bohn	On Point Motorsports	Toyota
20	38	Todd Gilliland	Front Row Motorsports	Ford
21	45	Trevor Bayne	Niece Motorsports	Chevrolet
22	24	Sam Mayer	GMS Racing	Chevrolet
23	56	Timmy Hill	Hill Motorsports	Chevrolet
24	41	Dawson Cram	Cram Racing Enterprises	Chevrolet
25	40	Ryan Truex	Niece Motorsports	Chevrolet
26	44	Natalie Decker	Niece Motorsports	Chevrolet
27	02	Tate Fogleman	Young's Motorsports	Chevrolet
28	33	B. J. McLeod	Reaume Brothers Racing	Toyota
29	10	Jennifer Jo Cobb	Jennifer Jo Cobb Racing	Chevrolet
30	83	Ray Ciccarelli	CMI Motorsports	Chevrolet
31	00	Josh Reaume	Reaume Brothers Racing	Chevrolet
32	68	Clay Greenfield	Clay Greenfield Motorsports	Toyota
33	42	Carson Hocevar	Niece Motorsports	Chevrolet
34	6	Norm Benning	Norm Benning Racing	Chevrolet
35	9	Codie Rohrbaugh	CR7 Motorsports	Chevrolet
36	11	Spencer Davis	Spencer Davis Motorsports	Toyota
37	75	Parker Kligerman	Henderson Motorsports	Chevrolet
Withdrew
WD	49	Tim Viens	CMI Motorsports	Chevrolet
Official starting lineup

== Race results ==
Stage 1 Laps: 50

Fin	#	Driver	Team	Make	Pts
1	2	Sheldon Creed	GMS Racing	Chevrolet	10
2	88	Matt Crafton	ThorSport Racing	Ford	9
3	13	Johnny Sauter	ThorSport Racing	Ford	8
4	21	Zane Smith	GMS Racing	Chevrolet	7
5	99	Ben Rhodes	ThorSport Racing	Ford	6
6	23	Brett Moffitt	GMS Racing	Chevrolet	5
7	18	Christian Eckes	Kyle Busch Motorsports	Toyota	4
8	98	Grant Enfinger	ThorSport Racing	Ford	3
9	4	Raphaël Lessard	Kyle Busch Motorsports	Toyota	2
10	52	Stewart Friesen	Halmar Friesen Racing	Toyota	1

Stage 2 Laps: 50

Fin	#	Driver	Team	Make	Pts
1	52	Stewart Friesen	Halmar Friesen Racing	Toyota	10
2	88	Matt Crafton	ThorSport Racing	Ford	9
3	98	Grant Enfinger	ThorSport Racing	Ford	8
4	4	Raphaël Lessard	Kyle Busch Motorsports	Toyota	7
5	23	Brett Moffitt	GMS Racing	Chevrolet	6
6	26	Tyler Ankrum	GMS Racing	Chevrolet	5
7	18	Christian Eckes	Kyle Busch Motorsports	Toyota	4
8	13	Johnny Sauter	ThorSport Racing	Ford	3
9	42	Carson Hocevar	Niece Motorsports	Chevrolet	2
10	99	Ben Rhodes	ThorSport Racing	Ford	1

Stage 3 Laps: 100

Fin	St	#	Driver	Team	Make	Laps	Led	Status	Pts
1	8	98	Grant Enfinger	ThorSport Racing	Ford	200	49	running	51
2	7	99	Ben Rhodes	ThorSport Racing	Ford	200	1	running	42
3	2	21	Zane Smith	GMS Racing	Chevrolet	200	20	running	41
4	14	18	Christian Eckes	Kyle Busch Motorsports	Toyota	200	0	running	41
5	5	88	Matt Crafton	ThorSport Racing	Ford	200	6	running	50
6	18	52	Stewart Friesen	Halmar Friesen Racing	Toyota	200	5	running	42
7	19	30	Danny Bohn	On Point Motorsports	Toyota	200	0	running	30
8	1	2	Sheldon Creed	GMS Racing	Chevrolet	200	65	running	39
9	13	22	Austin Wayne Self	AM Racing	Chevrolet	200	0	running	28
10	11	19	Derek Kraus	McAnally–Hilgemann Racing	Toyota	200	0	running	27
11	21	45	Trevor Bayne	Niece Motorsports	Chevrolet	200	0	running	26
12	6	26	Tyler Ankrum	GMS Racing	Chevrolet	200	0	running	30
13	33	42	Carson Hocevar	Niece Motorsports	Chevrolet	200	5	running	26
14	23	56	Timmy Hill	Hill Motorsports	Chevrolet	200	0	running	23
15	17	20	Spencer Boyd	Young's Motorsports	Chevrolet	200	0	running	22
16	24	41	Dawson Cram	Cram Racing Enterprises	Chevrolet	200	0	running	21
17	9	51	Brandon Jones	Kyle Busch Motorsports	Toyota	200	0	running	0
18	22	24	Sam Mayer	GMS Racing	Chevrolet	199	0	crash	19
19	16	3	Jordan Anderson	Jordan Anderson Racing	Chevrolet	199	0	running	18
20	10	4	Raphaël Lessard	Kyle Busch Motorsports	Toyota	199	10	running	26
21	32	68	Clay Greenfield	Clay Greenfield Motorsports	Toyota	198	0	running	16
22	28	33	B. J. McLeod	Reaume Brothers Racing	Toyota	198	0	running	0
23	15	13	Johnny Sauter	ThorSport Racing	Ford	197	39	running	25
24	37	75	Parker Kligerman	Henderson Motorsports	Chevrolet	196	0	running	13
25	30	83	Ray Ciccarelli	CMI Motorsports	Chevrolet	196	0	running	12
26	34	6	Norm Benning	Norm Benning Racing	Chevrolet	196	0	running	11
27	26	44	Natalie Decker	Niece Motorsports	Chevrolet	195	0	running	10
28	4	23	Brett Moffitt	GMS Racing	Chevrolet	192	0	crash	20
29	29	10	Jennifer Jo Cobb	Jennifer Jo Cobb Racing	Chevrolet	174	0	running	8
30	25	40	Ryan Truex	Niece Motorsports	Chevrolet	169	0	running	7
31	12	15	Tanner Gray	DGR-Crosley	Ford	154	0	dvp	6
32	20	38	Todd Gilliland	Front Row Motorsports	Ford	149	0	overheating	5
33	36	11	Spencer Davis	Spencer Davis Motorsports	Toyota	135	0	brakes	5
34	35	9	Codie Rohrbaugh	CR7 Motorsports	Chevrolet	123	0	overheating	5
35	3	16	Austin Hill	Hattori Racing Enterprises	Toyota	117	0	engine	5
36	27	02	Tate Fogleman	Young's Motorsports	Chevrolet	115	0	crash	5
37	31	00	Josh Reaume	Reaume Brothers Racing	Chevrolet	0	0	transmission	5
Official race results

Previous race: 2020 SpeedyCash.com 400	NASCAR Gander RV & Outdoors Truck Series; 2020 season	Next race: 2020 Lucas Oil 150
