= 2020 CarShield 200 =

2020 CarShield 200 presented by CK Power
Race details
- Race 14 of 23 of the 2020 NASCAR Gander RV & Outdoors Truck Series
- Date: August 30, 2020
- Official name: CarShield 200 presented by CK Power
- Location: Madison, Illinois, World Wide Technology Raceway
- Course: Permanent racing facility
- Course length: 1.25 miles (2.01 km)
- Distance: 160 laps, 200 mi (321.868 km)
- Average speed: 99.682 miles per hour (160.423 km/h)

Pole position
Driver	Zane Smith	GMS Racing
- Grid positions set by competition-based formula

Most laps led
Driver	Todd Gilliland	Front Row Motorsports
- Laps: 75

Winner
No. 2	Sheldon Creed	GMS Racing

Television in the United States
- Announcers: Vince Welch, Michael Waltrip, and Regan Smith

Radio in the United States
- Radio: Motor Racing Network

The 2020 CarShield 200 presented by CK Power was the 14th stock car race of the 2020 NASCAR Gander RV & Outdoors Truck Series season, and the 20th iteration of the event. The race was held on Sunday, August 30, 2020 in Madison, Illinois at World Wide Technology Raceway, a 1.25 miles (2.01 km) permanent oval-shaped racetrack. The race took the scheduled 160 laps to complete. At race's end, Sheldon Creed of GMS Racing would pass the dominating Todd Gilliland late in the race to win the race, the third of his career and the season. To fill the rest of the podium, Brett Moffitt of GMS Racing and Austin Hill of Hattori Racing Enterprises finished 2nd and 3rd, respectively.

== Background ==
Known as Gateway Motorsports Park until its renaming in April 2019, World Wide Technology Raceway is a 1.25-mile (2.01 km) paved oval motor racing track in Madison, Illinois, United States. The track previously held Truck races from 1998 to 2010, and returned starting in 2014.

=== Entry list ===
#	Driver	Team	Make
00	Kyle Donahue	Reaume Brothers Racing	Toyota
2	Sheldon Creed	GMS Racing	Chevrolet
02	Tate Fogleman	Young's Motorsports	Chevrolet
3	Jordan Anderson	Jordan Anderson Racing	Chevrolet
4	Raphaël Lessard	Kyle Busch Motorsports	Toyota
6	Norm Benning	Norm Benning Racing	Chevrolet
10	Jennifer Jo Cobb	Jennifer Jo Cobb Racing	Chevrolet
11	Spencer Davis*	Spencer Davis Motorsports	Toyota
13	Johnny Sauter	ThorSport Racing	Ford
15	Tanner Gray	DGR-Crosley	Ford
16	Austin Hill	Hattori Racing Enterprises	Toyota
18	Christian Eckes	Kyle Busch Motorsports	Toyota
19	Derek Kraus	McAnally–Hilgemann Racing	Toyota
20	Spencer Boyd	Young's Motorsports	Chevrolet
21	Zane Smith	GMS Racing	Chevrolet
22	Austin Wayne Self	AM Racing	Chevrolet
23	Brett Moffitt	GMS Racing	Chevrolet
24	Sam Mayer	GMS Racing	Chevrolet
26	Tyler Ankrum	GMS Racing	Chevrolet
30	Danny Bohn	On Point Motorsports	Toyota
33	Bryant Barnhill	Reaume Brothers Racing	Chevrolet
38	Todd Gilliland	Front Row Motorsports	Ford
40	Carson Hocevar	Niece Motorsports	Chevrolet
41	Dawson Cram	Cram Racing Enterprises	Chevrolet
44	Natalie Decker	Niece Motorsports	Chevrolet
45	Ty Majeski	Niece Motorsports	Chevrolet
49	Roger Reuse	CMI Motorsports	Chevrolet
51	Chandler Smith	Kyle Busch Motorsports	Toyota
52	Stewart Friesen	Halmar Friesen Racing	Toyota
56	Tyler Hill	Hill Motorsports	Chevrolet
68	Clay Greenfield	Clay Greenfield Motorsports	Toyota
88	Matt Crafton	ThorSport Racing	Ford
98	Grant Enfinger	ThorSport Racing	Ford
99	Ben Rhodes	ThorSport Racing	Ford
Official entry list

== Starting lineup ==
The starting lineup was based on a metric qualifying system based on the results and fastest laps of the previous race, the 2020 KDI Office Technology 200 and owner's points. As a result, Zane Smith of GMS Racing won the pole.

Pos.	#	Driver	Team	Make
1	21	Zane Smith	GMS Racing	Chevrolet
2	23	Brett Moffitt	GMS Racing	Chevrolet
3	88	Matt Crafton	ThorSport Racing	Ford
4	16	Austin Hill	Hattori Racing Enterprises	Toyota
5	99	Ben Rhodes	ThorSport Racing	Ford
6	38	Todd Gilliland	Front Row Motorsports	Ford
7	18	Christian Eckes	Kyle Busch Motorsports	Toyota
8	26	Tyler Ankrum	GMS Racing	Chevrolet
9	13	Johnny Sauter	ThorSport Racing	Ford
10	19	Derek Kraus	McAnally–Hilgemann Racing	Toyota
11	98	Grant Enfinger	ThorSport Racing	Ford
12	51	Chandler Smith	Kyle Busch Motorsports	Toyota
13	52	Stewart Friesen	Halmar Friesen Racing	Toyota
14	15	Tanner Gray	DGR-Crosley	Ford
15	24	Sam Mayer	GMS Racing	Chevrolet
16	40	Carson Hocevar	Niece Motorsports	Chevrolet
17	2	Sheldon Creed	GMS Racing	Chevrolet
18	45	Ty Majeski	Niece Motorsports	Chevrolet
19	4	Raphaël Lessard	Kyle Busch Motorsports	Toyota
20	22	Austin Wayne Self	AM Racing	Chevrolet
21	3	Jordan Anderson	Jordan Anderson Racing	Chevrolet
22	02	Tate Fogleman	Young's Motorsports	Chevrolet
23	20	Spencer Boyd	Young's Motorsports	Chevrolet
24	41	Dawson Cram	Cram Racing Enterprises	Chevrolet
25	68	Clay Greenfield	Clay Greenfield Motorsports	Toyota
26	33	Bryant Barnhill	Reaume Brothers Racing	Chevrolet
27	10	Jennifer Jo Cobb	Jennifer Jo Cobb Racing	Chevrolet
28	44	Natalie Decker	Niece Motorsports	Chevrolet
29	30	Danny Bohn	On Point Motorsports	Toyota
30	56	Tyler Hill	Hill Motorsports	Chevrolet
31	00	Kyle Donahue	Reaume Brothers Racing	Toyota
32	6	Norm Benning	Norm Benning Racing	Chevrolet
33	49	Roger Reuse	CMI Motorsports	Chevrolet
Withdrew
WD	11	Spencer Davis	Spencer Davis Motorsports	Toyota
Official starting lineup

== Race results ==
Stage 1 Laps: 55

Fin	#	Driver	Team	Make	Pts
1	38	Todd Gilliland	Front Row Motorsports	Ford	10
2	21	Zane Smith	GMS Racing	Chevrolet	9
3	23	Brett Moffitt	GMS Racing	Chevrolet	8
4	18	Christian Eckes	Kyle Busch Motorsports	Toyota	7
5	88	Matt Crafton	ThorSport Racing	Ford	6
6	24	Sam Mayer	GMS Racing	Chevrolet	5
7	99	Ben Rhodes	ThorSport Racing	Ford	4
8	2	Sheldon Creed	GMS Racing	Chevrolet	3
9	45	Ty Majeski	Niece Motorsports	Chevrolet	2
10	26	Tyler Ankrum	GMS Racing	Chevrolet	1

Stage 2 Laps: 55

Fin	#	Driver	Team	Make	Pts
1	38	Todd Gilliland	Front Row Motorsports	Ford	10
2	18	Christian Eckes	Kyle Busch Motorsports	Toyota	9
3	21	Zane Smith	GMS Racing	Chevrolet	8
4	24	Sam Mayer	GMS Racing	Chevrolet	7
5	2	Sheldon Creed	GMS Racing	Chevrolet	6
6	23	Brett Moffitt	GMS Racing	Chevrolet	5
7	26	Tyler Ankrum	GMS Racing	Chevrolet	4
8	99	Ben Rhodes	ThorSport Racing	Ford	3
9	4	Raphaël Lessard	Kyle Busch Motorsports	Toyota	2
10	52	Stewart Friesen	Halmar Friesen Racing	Toyota	1

Stage 3 Laps: 50

Fin	St	#	Driver	Team	Make	Laps	Led	Status	Pts
1	17	2	Sheldon Creed	GMS Racing	Chevrolet	160	15	running	49
2	2	23	Brett Moffitt	GMS Racing	Chevrolet	160	0	running	48
3	4	16	Austin Hill	Hattori Racing Enterprises	Toyota	160	0	running	34
4	15	24	Sam Mayer	GMS Racing	Chevrolet	160	24	running	45
5	13	52	Stewart Friesen	Halmar Friesen Racing	Toyota	160	0	running	33
6	19	4	Raphaël Lessard	Kyle Busch Motorsports	Toyota	160	0	running	33
7	1	21	Zane Smith	GMS Racing	Chevrolet	160	45	running	47
8	11	98	Grant Enfinger	ThorSport Racing	Ford	160	0	running	29
9	18	45	Ty Majeski	Niece Motorsports	Chevrolet	160	0	running	30
10	14	15	Tanner Gray	DGR-Crosley	Ford	160	0	running	27
11	5	99	Ben Rhodes	ThorSport Racing	Ford	160	0	running	33
12	8	26	Tyler Ankrum	GMS Racing	Chevrolet	160	0	running	30
13	10	19	Derek Kraus	McAnally–Hilgemann Racing	Toyota	160	0	running	24
14	3	88	Matt Crafton	ThorSport Racing	Ford	160	0	running	29
15	16	40	Carson Hocevar	Niece Motorsports	Chevrolet	160	0	running	22
16	29	30	Danny Bohn	On Point Motorsports	Toyota	160	0	running	21
17	21	3	Jordan Anderson	Jordan Anderson Racing	Chevrolet	160	0	running	20
18	22	02	Tate Fogleman	Young's Motorsports	Chevrolet	160	0	running	19
19	25	68	Clay Greenfield	Clay Greenfield Motorsports	Toyota	160	0	running	18
20	31	00	Kyle Donahue	Reaume Brothers Racing	Toyota	160	0	running	0
21	30	56	Tyler Hill	Hill Motorsports	Chevrolet	159	0	running	16
22	24	41	Dawson Cram	Cram Racing Enterprises	Chevrolet	158	0	running	15
23	12	51	Chandler Smith	Kyle Busch Motorsports	Toyota	157	0	running	14
24	6	38	Todd Gilliland	Front Row Motorsports	Ford	157	75	running	33
25	23	20	Spencer Boyd	Young's Motorsports	Chevrolet	157	1	running	12
26	26	33	Bryant Barnhill	Reaume Brothers Racing	Chevrolet	156	0	running	11
27	33	49	Roger Reuse	CMI Motorsports	Chevrolet	151	0	running	10
28	28	44	Natalie Decker	Niece Motorsports	Chevrolet	150	0	running	9
29	32	6	Norm Benning	Norm Benning Racing	Chevrolet	148	0	running	8
30	20	22	Austin Wayne Self	AM Racing	Chevrolet	145	0	dvp	7
31	27	10	Jennifer Jo Cobb	Jennifer Jo Cobb Racing	Chevrolet	124	0	crash	6
32	7	18	Christian Eckes	Kyle Busch Motorsports	Toyota	121	0	driveshaft	21
33	9	13	Johnny Sauter	ThorSport Racing	Ford	22	0	vibration	5
Official race results

Previous race: 2020 KDI Office Technology 200	NASCAR Gander RV & Outdoors Truck Series; 2020 season	Next race: 2020 South Carolina Education Lottery 200
