= 2020 KDI Office Technology 200 =

Race details
- Race 13 of 23 of the 2020 NASCAR Gander RV & Outdoors Truck Series
- Date: August 21, 2020
- Official name: KDI Office Technology 200
- Course: Permanent racing facility
- Course length: 1 miles (1.6 km)
- Distance: 200 laps, 200 mi (320 km)
- Average speed: 110.752 miles per hour (178.238 km/h)

Pole position
Driver	Brett Moffitt	GMS Racing
- Grid positions set by competition-based formula

Most laps led
Driver	Zane Smith; Brett Moffitt	GMS Racing
- Laps: 50

Winner
No. 21	Zane Smith	GMS Racing

Television in the United States
- Network: Fox Sports 1
- Announcers: Vince Welch, Michael Waltrip, and Jamie McMurray

Radio in the United States
- Radio: Motor Racing Network

The 2020 KDI Office Technology 200 was the 13th stock car race of the 2020 NASCAR Gander RV & Outdoors Truck Series season and the 21st iteration of the event. The race was originally to be held on May 1, 2020 but was postponed to August 21, 2020 due to the COVID-19 pandemic. The race was held in Dover, Delaware at Dover International Speedway, a 1 mile (1.6 km) permanent oval-shaped racetrack. The race took the scheduled 200 laps to complete. At race's end, Zane Smith of GMS Racing would win the race after pulling away on a late race restart, the second of his career and the second of the season. To fill the podium, Matt Crafton of ThorSport Racing and Brett Moffitt of GMS Racing would finish second and third, respectively.

== Background ==
The layout of Dover International Speedway, the venue where the race was held.

Dover International Speedway (formerly Dover Downs International Speedway) is a race track in Dover, Delaware, United States. Since opening in 1969, it has held at least two NASCAR races. In addition to NASCAR, the track also hosted USAC and the Verizon IndyCar Series. The track features one layout, a 1 mile (1.6 km) concrete oval, with 24° banking in the turns and 9° banking on the straights. The speedway was owned and operated by Dover Motorsports.

The track, nicknamed "The Monster Mile", was built in 1969 by Melvin Joseph of Melvin L. Joseph Construction Company, Inc., with an asphalt surface, but was replaced with concrete in 1995. Six years later in 2001, the track's capacity moved to 135,000 seats, making the track have the largest capacity of sports venue in the mid-Atlantic. In 2002, the name changed to Dover International Speedway from Dover Downs International Speedway after Dover Downs Gaming and Entertainment split, making Dover Motorsports. From 2007 to 2009, the speedway worked on an improvement project called "The Monster Makeover", which expanded facilities at the track and beautified the track. After the 2014 season, the track's capacity was reduced to 95,500 seats.

=== Entry list ===
#	Driver	Team	Make
00	J. J. Yeley	Reaume Brothers Racing	Toyota
2	Sheldon Creed	GMS Racing	Chevrolet
02	Tate Fogleman	Young's Motorsports	Chevrolet
3	Jordan Anderson	Jordan Anderson Racing	Chevrolet
4	Raphaël Lessard	Kyle Busch Motorsports	Toyota
6	Norm Benning	Norm Benning Racing	Chevrolet
10	Jennifer Jo Cobb	Jennifer Jo Cobb Racing	Chevrolet
11	Spencer Davis	Spencer Davis Motorsports	Toyota
13	Johnny Sauter	ThorSport Racing	Ford
15	Tanner Gray	DGR-Crosley	Ford
16	Austin Hill	Hattori Racing Enterprises	Toyota
18	Christian Eckes	Kyle Busch Motorsports	Toyota
19	Derek Kraus	McAnally–Hilgemann Racing	Toyota
20	Spencer Boyd	Young's Motorsports	Chevrolet
21	Zane Smith	GMS Racing	Chevrolet
22	Austin Wayne Self	AM Racing	Chevrolet
23	Brett Moffitt	GMS Racing	Chevrolet
24	Sam Mayer	GMS Racing	Chevrolet
26	Tyler Ankrum	GMS Racing	Chevrolet
28	Bryan Dauzat*	FDNY Racing	Chevrolet
33	Bryant Barnhill	Reaume Brothers Racing	Chevrolet
38	Todd Gilliland	Front Row Motorsports	Ford
40	Carson Hocevar	Niece Motorsports	Chevrolet
44	Bayley Currey	Niece Motorsports	Chevrolet
45	Ty Majeski	Niece Motorsports	Chevrolet
49	Tyler Hill	CMI Motorsports	Chevrolet
51	Chandler Smith	Kyle Busch Motorsports	Toyota
52	Stewart Friesen	Halmar Friesen Racing	Toyota
55	Dawson Cram	Long Motorsports	Chevrolet
56	Timmy Hill	Hill Motorsports	Chevrolet
68	Clay Greenfield	Clay Greenfield Motorsports	Toyota
75	Parker Kligerman	Henderson Motorsports	Chevrolet
83	Tim Viens	CMI Motorsports	Chevrolet
88	Matt Crafton	ThorSport Racing	Ford
98	Grant Enfinger	ThorSport Racing	Ford
99	Ben Rhodes	ThorSport Racing	Ford
Official entry list

*Withdrew.

== Starting lineup ==
The starting lineup was based on a metric qualifying system based on the previous race, the 2020 Sunoco 159 and owner's points. As a result, Brett Moffitt of GMS Racing would win the pole.

Pos.	#	Driver	Team	Make
1	23	Brett Moffitt	GMS Racing	Chevrolet
2	2	Sheldon Creed	GMS Racing	Chevrolet
3	16	Austin Hill	Hattori Racing Enterprises	Toyota
4	88	Matt Crafton	ThorSport Racing	Ford
5	4	Raphaël Lessard	Kyle Busch Motorsports	Toyota
6	26	Tyler Ankrum	GMS Racing	Chevrolet
7	21	Zane Smith	GMS Racing	Chevrolet
8	98	Grant Enfinger	ThorSport Racing	Ford
9	18	Christian Eckes	Kyle Busch Motorsports	Toyota
10	99	Ben Rhodes	ThorSport Racing	Ford
11	52	Stewart Friesen	Halmar Friesen Racing	Toyota
12	15	Tanner Gray	DGR-Crosley	Ford
13	75	Parker Kligerman	Henderson Motorsports	Chevrolet
14	22	Austin Wayne Self	AM Racing	Chevrolet
15	13	Johnny Sauter	ThorSport Racing	Ford
16	19	Derek Kraus	McAnally–Hilgemann Racing	Toyota
17	38	Todd Gilliland	Front Row Motorsports	Ford
18	02	Tate Fogleman	Young's Motorsports	Chevrolet
19	20	Spencer Boyd	Young's Motorsports	Chevrolet
20	40	Carson Hocevar	Niece Motorsports	Chevrolet
21	45	Ty Majeski	Niece Motorsports	Chevrolet
22	11	Spencer Davis	Spencer Davis Motorsports	Toyota
23	51	Chandler Smith	Kyle Busch Motorsports	Toyota
24	83	Tim Viens	CMI Motorsports	Chevrolet
25	3	Jordan Anderson	Jordan Anderson Racing	Chevrolet
26	24	Sam Mayer	GMS Racing	Chevrolet
27	6	Norm Benning	Norm Benning Racing	Chevrolet
28	44	Bayley Currey	Niece Motorsports	Chevrolet
29	10	Jennifer Jo Cobb	Jennifer Jo Cobb Racing	Chevrolet
30	56	Timmy Hill	Hill Motorsports	Chevrolet
31	00	J. J. Yeley	Reaume Brothers Racing	Toyota
32	33	Bryant Barnhill	Reaume Brothers Racing	Chevrolet
33	68	Clay Greenfield	Clay Greenfield Motorsports	Toyota
34	49	Tyler Hill	CMI Motorsports	Chevrolet
35	55	Dawson Cram	Long Motorsports	Chevrolet
Withdrew
WD	28	Bryan Dauzat	FDNY Racing	Chevrolet
Official starting lineup

== Race results ==
Stage 1 Laps: 45

St	#	Driver	Team	Make	Pts
1	16	Austin Hill	Hattori Racing Enterprises	Toyota	10
2	88	Matt Crafton	ThorSport Racing	Ford	9
3	26	Tyler Ankrum	GMS Racing	Chevrolet	8
4	21	Zane Smith	GMS Racing	Chevrolet	7
5	23	Brett Moffitt	GMS Racing	Chevrolet	6
6	2	Sheldon Creed	GMS Racing	Chevrolet	5
7	18	Christian Eckes	Kyle Busch Motorsports	Toyota	4
8	98	Grant Enfinger	ThorSport Racing	Ford	3
9	4	Raphaël Lessard	Kyle Busch Motorsports	Toyota	2
10	38	Todd Gilliland	Front Row Motorsports	Ford	1

Stage 2 Laps: 45

St	#	Driver	Team	Make	Pts
1	21	Zane Smith	GMS Racing	Chevrolet	10
2	19	Derek Kraus	McAnally–Hilgemann Racing	Toyota	9
3	18	Christian Eckes	Kyle Busch Motorsports	Toyota	8
4	2	Sheldon Creed	GMS Racing	Chevrolet	7
5	23	Brett Moffitt	GMS Racing	Chevrolet	6
6	99	Ben Rhodes	ThorSport Racing	Ford	5
7	38	Todd Gilliland	Front Row Motorsports	Ford	4
8	13	Johnny Sauter	ThorSport Racing	Ford	3
9	26	Tyler Ankrum	GMS Racing	Chevrolet	2
10	88	Matt Crafton	ThorSport Racing	Ford	1

Stage 3 Laps: 110

Fin	St	#	Driver	Team	Make	Laps	Led	Status	Pts
1	7	21	Zane Smith	GMS Racing	Chevrolet	200	50	running	57
2	4	88	Matt Crafton	ThorSport Racing	Ford	200	1	running	45
3	1	23	Brett Moffitt	GMS Racing	Chevrolet	200	50	running	46
4	17	38	Todd Gilliland	Front Row Motorsports	Ford	200	2	running	38
5	10	99	Ben Rhodes	ThorSport Racing	Ford	200	0	running	37
6	15	13	Johnny Sauter	ThorSport Racing	Ford	200	0	running	34
7	6	26	Tyler Ankrum	GMS Racing	Chevrolet	200	0	running	40
8	3	16	Austin Hill	Hattori Racing Enterprises	Toyota	200	21	running	39
9	11	52	Stewart Friesen	Halmar Friesen Racing	Toyota	200	0	running	28
10	16	19	Derek Kraus	McAnally–Hilgemann Racing	Toyota	200	9	running	36
11	9	18	Christian Eckes	Kyle Busch Motorsports	Toyota	200	34	running	38
12	20	40	Carson Hocevar	Niece Motorsports	Chevrolet	199	0	running	25
13	8	98	Grant Enfinger	ThorSport Racing	Ford	199	0	running	27
14	21	45	Ty Majeski	Niece Motorsports	Chevrolet	199	0	running	23
15	26	24	Sam Mayer	GMS Racing	Chevrolet	199	0	running	22
16	22	11	Spencer Davis	Spencer Davis Motorsports	Toyota	199	0	running	21
17	12	15	Tanner Gray	DGR-Crosley	Ford	198	1	running	20
18	28	44	Bayley Currey	Niece Motorsports	Chevrolet	198	0	running	19
19	5	4	Raphaël Lessard	Kyle Busch Motorsports	Toyota	198	0	running	20
20	23	51	Chandler Smith	Kyle Busch Motorsports	Toyota	198	31	running	17
21	30	56	Timmy Hill	Hill Motorsports	Chevrolet	197	0	running	16
22	2	2	Sheldon Creed	GMS Racing	Chevrolet	196	1	running	27
23	14	22	Austin Wayne Self	AM Racing	Chevrolet	196	0	running	14
24	25	3	Jordan Anderson	Jordan Anderson Racing	Chevrolet	196	0	running	13
25	35	55	Dawson Cram	Long Motorsports	Chevrolet	195	0	running	12
26	31	00	J. J. Yeley	Reaume Brothers Racing	Toyota	194	0	running	11
27	18	02	Tate Fogleman	Young's Motorsports	Chevrolet	193	0	running	10
28	19	20	Spencer Boyd	Young's Motorsports	Chevrolet	193	0	running	9
29	29	10	Jennifer Jo Cobb	Jennifer Jo Cobb Racing	Chevrolet	189	0	running	8
30	34	49	Tyler Hill	CMI Motorsports	Chevrolet	188	0	running	7
31	24	83	Tim Viens	CMI Motorsports	Chevrolet	180	0	running	6
32	33	68	Clay Greenfield	Clay Greenfield Motorsports	Toyota	133	0	suspension	5
33	32	33	Bryant Barnhill	Reaume Brothers Racing	Chevrolet	109	0	ignition	5
34	13	75	Parker Kligerman	Henderson Motorsports	Chevrolet	94	0	engine	5
35	27	6	Norm Benning	Norm Benning Racing	Chevrolet	56	0	brakes	5
Official race results

Previous race: 2020 Sunoco 159	NASCAR Gander RV & Outdoors Truck Series; 2020 season	Next race: 2020 CarShield 200
