= 2020 Lucas Oil 150 =

Race details
- Race 23 of 23 of the 2020 NASCAR Gander RV & Outdoors Truck Series
- Date: November 6, 2020
- Official name: Lucas Oil 150
- Location: Avondale, Arizona, Phoenix Raceway
- Course: Permanent racing facility
- Course length: 1 miles (1.6 km)
- Distance: 156 laps, 156 mi (251.057 km)
- Scheduled distance: 150 laps, 150 mi (241.401 km)
- Average speed: 99.557 miles per hour (160.221 km/h)

Pole position
Driver	Grant Enfinger	ThorSport Racing
- Grid positions set by competition-based formula

Most laps led
Driver	Brett Moffitt	GMS Racing
- Laps: 78

Winner
No. 2	Sheldon Creed	GMS Racing

Television in the United States
- Network: Fox Sports 1
- Announcers: Vince Welch, Michael Waltrip, and Kurt Busch

Radio in the United States
- Radio: Motor Racing Network

The 2020 Lucas Oil 150 was the 23rd and final stock car race of the 2020 NASCAR Gander RV & Outdoors Truck Series season, the 26th iteration of the event, and the championship race that decided the champion of that year's season. The race was held on Friday, November 6, 2020 in Avondale, Arizona at Phoenix Raceway, a 1 mile (1.6 km) permanent low-banked tri-oval race track. The race was extended from the scheduled 150 laps to 156 due to a NASCAR overtime finish. After a spin from Dawson Cram would set up an overtime finish, Sheldon Creed would decide to stay out to take the lead. He would manage to hold on and defend the lead en route to his first NASCAR Gander RV & Outdoors Truck Series championship, and the 5th of his career and of the season. To fill out the podium, Zane Smith of GMS Racing and Chandler Smith of Kyle Busch Motorsports finished 2nd and 3rd, respectively.

The final standings for the Championship 4 from 1st-4th would stand as Sheldon Creed, Zane Smith, Brett Moffitt, and Grant Enfinger.

== Background ==
The layout of Phoenix Raceway, the venue where the race was held.

Phoenix Raceway is a one-mile, low-banked tri-oval race track located in Avondale, Arizona. It is named after the nearby metropolitan area of Phoenix. The motorsport track opened in 1964 and currently hosts two NASCAR race weekends annually. PIR has also hosted the IndyCar Series, CART, USAC and the Rolex Sports Car Series. The raceway is currently owned and operated by International Speedway Corporation.

The raceway was originally constructed with a 2.5 mi (4.0 km) road course that ran both inside and outside of the main tri-oval. In 1991 the track was reconfigured with the current 1.51 mi (2.43 km) interior layout. PIR has an estimated grandstand seating capacity of around 67,000. Lights were installed around the track in 2004 following the addition of a second annual NASCAR race weekend.

Phoenix Raceway is home to two annual NASCAR race weekends, one of 13 facilities on the NASCAR schedule to host more than one race weekend a year. The track is both the first and last stop in the western United States, as well as the fourth and the last track on the schedule.

This was the first time the championship race was held in Phoenix.

=== Championship 4 drivers ===
Grant Enfinger: Made it to the Championship 4 after winning a wild race at the 2020 NASCAR Hall of Fame 200.

Sheldon Creed: Made it to the Championship 4 after dominating and winning the 2020 SpeedyCash.com 400.

Zane Smith: Made it to the Championship 4 based on having the most owner points out of the 5 non-winners from the Round of 8.

Brett Moffitt: Made it to the Championship 4 after winning the 2020 Clean Harbors 200.

=== Entry list ===
- (R) denotes rookie driver.
- (i) denotes driver who is ineligible for series driver points.
- (CC) denotes Championship Contender.

#	Driver	Team	Make
00	Josh Reaume	Reaume Brothers Racing	Toyota
2	Sheldon Creed (CC)	GMS Racing	Chevrolet
02	Tate Fogleman (R)	Young's Motorsports	Chevrolet
3	Jordan Anderson	Jordan Anderson Racing	Chevrolet
4	Raphaël Lessard (R)	Kyle Busch Motorsports	Toyota
10	Jennifer Jo Cobb	Jennifer Jo Cobb Racing	Chevrolet
11	Spencer Davis (R)	Spencer Davis Motorsports	Toyota
13	Johnny Sauter	ThorSport Racing	Ford
15	Tanner Gray (R)	DGR-Crosley	Ford
16	Austin Hill	Hattori Racing Enterprises	Toyota
17	Dylan Lupton	DGR-Crosley	Ford
18	Christian Eckes (R)	Kyle Busch Motorsports	Toyota
19	Derek Kraus (R)	McAnally–Hilgemann Racing	Toyota
20	Spencer Boyd	Young's Motorsports	Chevrolet
21	Zane Smith (R) (CC)	GMS Racing	Chevrolet
22	Austin Wayne Self	AM Racing	Chevrolet
23	Brett Moffitt (CC)	GMS Racing	Chevrolet
24	Sam Mayer	GMS Racing	Chevrolet
26	Tyler Ankrum	GMS Racing	Chevrolet
30	Danny Bohn	On Point Motorsports	Toyota
33	Akinori Ogata	Reaume Brothers Racing	Toyota
38	Todd Gilliland	Front Row Motorsports	Ford
40	Ryan Truex	Niece Motorsports	Chevrolet
41	Dawson Cram	Cram Racing Enterprises	Chevrolet
42	Carson Hocevar	Niece Motorsports	Chevrolet
45	Trevor Bayne	Niece Motorsports	Chevrolet
51	Chandler Smith	Kyle Busch Motorsports	Toyota
52	Stewart Friesen	Halmar Friesen Racing	Toyota
56	Tyler Hill	Hill Motorsports	Chevrolet
88	Matt Crafton	ThorSport Racing	Ford
97	Robby Lyons (i)	Diversified Motorsports Enterprises	Chevrolet
98	Grant Enfinger (CC)	ThorSport Racing	Ford
99	Ben Rhodes	ThorSport Racing	Ford
Official entry list

== Starting lineup ==
The starting lineup was determined by a metric qualifying system based on the results and fastest lap of the last race, the 2020 NASCAR Hall of Fame 200 and owner's points. As a result, Grant Enfinger of ThorSport Racing won the pole.

Pos.	#	Driver	Team	Make
1	98	Grant Enfinger	ThorSport Racing	Ford
2	21	Zane Smith	GMS Racing	Chevrolet
3	2	Sheldon Creed	GMS Racing	Chevrolet
4	23	Brett Moffitt	GMS Racing	Chevrolet
5	88	Matt Crafton	ThorSport Racing	Ford
6	99	Ben Rhodes	ThorSport Racing	Ford
7	18	Christian Eckes	Kyle Busch Motorsports	Toyota
8	19	Derek Kraus	McAnally–Hilgemann Racing	Toyota
9	52	Stewart Friesen	Halmar Friesen Racing	Toyota
10	26	Tyler Ankrum	GMS Racing	Chevrolet
11	30	Danny Bohn	On Point Motorsports	Toyota
12	45	Trevor Bayne	Niece Motorsports	Chevrolet
13	4	Raphaël Lessard	Kyle Busch Motorsports	Toyota
14	22	Austin Wayne Self	AM Racing	Chevrolet
15	24	Sam Mayer	GMS Racing	Chevrolet
16	13	Johnny Sauter	ThorSport Racing	Ford
17	16	Austin Hill	Hattori Racing Enterprises	Toyota
18	20	Spencer Boyd	Young's Motorsports	Chevrolet
19	42	Carson Hocevar	Niece Motorsports	Chevrolet
20	3	Jordan Anderson	Jordan Anderson Racing	Chevrolet
21	51	Chandler Smith	Kyle Busch Motorsports	Toyota
22	38	Todd Gilliland	Front Row Motorsports	Ford
23	15	Tanner Gray	DGR-Crosley	Ford
24	41	Dawson Cram	Cram Racing Enterprises	Chevrolet
25	40	Ryan Truex	Niece Motorsports	Chevrolet
26	56	Tyler Hill	Hill Motorsports	Chevrolet
27	11	Spencer Davis	Spencer Davis Motorsports	Toyota
28	02	Tate Fogleman	Young's Motorsports	Chevrolet
29	33	Akinori Ogata	Reaume Brothers Racing	Toyota
30	10	Jennifer Jo Cobb	Jennifer Jo Cobb Racing	Chevrolet
31	00	Josh Reaume	Reaume Brothers Racing	Toyota
32	17	Dylan Lupton	DGR-Crosley	Ford
33	97	Robby Lyons	Diversified Motorsports Enterprises	Chevrolet
Official starting lineup

== Race results ==
- Note: Sheldon Creed, Grant Enfinger, Brett Moffitt, and Zane Smith are not eligible for stage points because of their participation in the Championship 4.

Stage 1 Laps: 45

Fin	#	Driver	Team	Make	Pts
1	21	Zane Smith	GMS Racing	Chevrolet	0
2	2	Sheldon Creed	GMS Racing	Chevrolet	0
3	23	Brett Moffitt	GMS Racing	Chevrolet	0
4	98	Grant Enfinger	ThorSport Racing	Ford	0
5	88	Matt Crafton	ThorSport Racing	Ford	6
6	99	Ben Rhodes	ThorSport Racing	Ford	5
7	26	Tyler Ankrum	GMS Racing	Chevrolet	4
8	18	Christian Eckes	Kyle Busch Motorsports	Toyota	3
9	52	Stewart Friesen	Halmar Friesen Racing	Toyota	2
10	19	Derek Kraus	McAnally–Hilgemann Racing	Toyota	1

Stage 2 Laps: 45

Fin	#	Driver	Team	Make	Pts
1	23	Brett Moffitt	GMS Racing	Chevrolet	0
2	21	Zane Smith	GMS Racing	Chevrolet	0
3	2	Sheldon Creed	GMS Racing	Chevrolet	0
4	99	Ben Rhodes	ThorSport Racing	Ford	7
5	98	Grant Enfinger	ThorSport Racing	Ford	0
6	52	Stewart Friesen	Halmar Friesen Racing	Toyota	5
7	26	Tyler Ankrum	GMS Racing	Chevrolet	4
8	4	Raphaël Lessard	Kyle Busch Motorsports	Toyota	3
9	18	Christian Eckes	Kyle Busch Motorsports	Toyota	2
10	24	Sam Mayer	GMS Racing	Chevrolet	1

Stage 3 Laps: 66

Fin	St	#	Driver	Team	Make	Laps	Led	Status	Pts
1	3	2	Sheldon Creed	GMS Racing	Chevrolet	156	27	running	40
2	2	21	Zane Smith	GMS Racing	Chevrolet	156	48	running	35
3	21	51	Chandler Smith	Kyle Busch Motorsports	Toyota	156	0	running	34
4	7	18	Christian Eckes	Kyle Busch Motorsports	Toyota	156	0	running	38
5	13	4	Raphaël Lessard	Kyle Busch Motorsports	Toyota	156	0	running	35
6	9	52	Stewart Friesen	Halmar Friesen Racing	Toyota	156	0	running	38
7	6	99	Ben Rhodes	ThorSport Racing	Ford	156	1	running	42
8	10	26	Tyler Ankrum	GMS Racing	Chevrolet	156	0	running	37
9	22	38	Todd Gilliland	Front Row Motorsports	Ford	156	0	running	28
10	4	23	Brett Moffitt	GMS Racing	Chevrolet	156	78	running	27
11	16	13	Johnny Sauter	ThorSport Racing	Ford	156	0	running	26
12	17	16	Austin Hill	Hattori Racing Enterprises	Toyota	156	0	running	25
13	1	98	Grant Enfinger	ThorSport Racing	Ford	156	2	running	24
14	5	88	Matt Crafton	ThorSport Racing	Ford	156	0	running	29
15	23	15	Tanner Gray	DGR-Crosley	Ford	156	0	running	22
16	32	17	Dylan Lupton	DGR-Crosley	Ford	156	0	running	21
17	15	24	Sam Mayer	GMS Racing	Chevrolet	156	0	running	21
18	12	45	Trevor Bayne	Niece Motorsports	Chevrolet	156	0	running	19
19	28	02	Tate Fogleman	Young's Motorsports	Chevrolet	156	0	running	18
20	14	22	Austin Wayne Self	AM Racing	Chevrolet	156	0	running	17
21	25	40	Ryan Truex	Niece Motorsports	Chevrolet	155	0	running	16
22	20	3	Jordan Anderson	Jordan Anderson Racing	Chevrolet	154	0	running	15
23	27	11	Spencer Davis	Spencer Davis Motorsports	Toyota	154	0	running	14
24	8	19	Derek Kraus	McAnally–Hilgemann Racing	Toyota	153	0	running	14
25	26	56	Tyler Hill	Hill Motorsports	Chevrolet	153	0	running	12
26	11	30	Danny Bohn	On Point Motorsports	Toyota	153	0	running	11
27	18	20	Spencer Boyd	Young's Motorsports	Chevrolet	152	0	running	10
28	24	41	Dawson Cram	Cram Racing Enterprises	Chevrolet	152	0	running	9
29	33	97	Robby Lyons	Diversified Motorsports Enterprises	Chevrolet	152	0	running	0
30	29	33	Akinori Ogata	Reaume Brothers Racing	Toyota	150	0	running	7
31	30	10	Jennifer Jo Cobb	Jennifer Jo Cobb Racing	Chevrolet	147	0	running	6
32	19	42	Carson Hocevar	Niece Motorsports	Chevrolet	103	0	crash	5
33	31	00	Josh Reaume	Reaume Brothers Racing	Toyota	44	0	brakes	5
Official race results

Previous race: 2020 NASCAR Hall of Fame 200	NASCAR Gander RV & Outdoors Truck Series; 2020 season	Next race: 2021 NextEra Energy 250
