= 2020 Henry Ford Health System 200 =

Race details
- Race 11 of 23 of the 2020 NASCAR Gander RV & Outdoors Truck Series
- Date: August 7, 2020
- Official name: Henry Ford Health System 200
- Location: Cambridge Township, Michigan, Michigan International Speedway
- Course: Permanent racing facility
- Course length: 2 miles (3.2 km)
- Distance: 107 laps, 214 mi (344.398 km)
- Scheduled distance: 100 laps, 200 mi (321.868 km)
- Average speed: 96.918 miles per hour (155.974 km/h)

Pole position
Driver	Chandler Smith	Kyle Busch Motorsports
- Grid positions set by ballot

Most laps led
Driver	Grant Enfinger	ThorSport Racing
- Laps: 38

Winner
No. 21	Zane Smith	GMS Racing

Television in the United States
- Network: Fox Sports 1
- Announcers: Vince Welch, Michael Waltrip, and Jamie McMurray

Radio in the United States
- Radio: Motor Racing Network

The 2020 Henry Ford Health System 200 was the 11th stock car racing of the 2020 NASCAR Gander RV & Outdoors Truck Series season, and the 21st iteration of the event. The race was held on August 7, 2020 in Cambridge Township, Michigan at Michigan International Speedway, a two-mile (3.2 km) permanent moderate-banked D-shaped speedway. The race was extended from 100 laps to 107 due to multiple NASCAR overtime attempts. After a chaotic ending that saw the leader spinning on the last lap, Zane Smith of GMS Racing would survive the carnage of the day and win his first ever NASCAR Gander RV & Outdoors Truck Series race. To fill the podium, Christian Eckes of Kyle Busch Motorsports and Tanner Gray of DGR-Crosley finished second and third, respectively.

== Background ==
The race was held at Michigan International Speedway, a two-mile (3.2 km) moderate-banked D-shaped speedway located in Cambridge Township, Michigan. The track is used primarily for NASCAR events. It is known as a "sister track" to Texas World Speedway as MIS's oval design was a direct basis of TWS, with moderate modifications to the banking in the corners, and was used as the basis of Auto Club Speedway. The track is owned by International Speedway Corporation. Michigan International Speedway is recognized as one of motorsports' premier facilities because of its wide racing surface and high banking (by open-wheel standards; the 18-degree banking is modest by stock car standards).

=== Entry list ===
#	Driver	Team	Make
00	Josh Reaume	Reaume Brothers Racing	Toyota
2	Sheldon Creed	GMS Racing	Chevrolet
02	Tate Fogleman	Young's Motorsports	Chevrolet
3	Jordan Anderson	Jordan Anderson Racing	Chevrolet
4	Raphaël Lessard	Kyle Busch Motorsports	Toyota
04	Cory Roper	Roper Racing	Ford
6	Norm Benning	Norm Benning Racing	Chevrolet
8	John Hunter Nemechek	NEMCO Motorsports	Ford
9	Codie Rohrbaugh	CR7 Motorsports	Chevrolet
10	Jennifer Jo Cobb	Jennifer Jo Cobb Racing	Chevrolet
11	Spencer Davis	Spencer Davis Motorsports	Toyota
13	Johnny Sauter	ThorSport Racing	Ford
14	Trey Hutchens	Trey Hutchens Racing	Chevrolet
15	Tanner Gray	DGR-Crosley	Ford
16	Austin Hill	Hattori Racing Enterprises	Toyota
17	David Ragan	DGR-Crosley	Ford
18	Christian Eckes	Kyle Busch Motorsports	Toyota
19	Derek Kraus	McAnally–Hilgemann Racing	Toyota
20	Spencer Boyd	Young's Motorsports	Chevrolet
21	Zane Smith	GMS Racing	Chevrolet
22	Austin Wayne Self	AM Racing	Chevrolet
23	Brett Moffitt	GMS Racing	Chevrolet
24	David Gravel	GMS Racing	Chevrolet
26	Tyler Ankrum	GMS Racing	Chevrolet
30	Brennan Poole	On Point Motorsports	Toyota
33	Jesse Iwuji	Reaume Brothers Racing	Toyota
38	Todd Gilliland	Front Row Motorsports	Ford
40	Ryan Truex	Niece Motorsports	Chevrolet
44	Jeb Burton	Niece Motorsports	Chevrolet
45	Ty Majeski	Niece Motorsports	Chevrolet
49	Tim Viens	CMI Motorsports	Chevrolet
51	Chandler Smith	Kyle Busch Motorsports	Toyota
52	Stewart Friesen	Halmar Friesen Racing	Toyota
55	Dawson Cram	Long Motorsports	Chevrolet
56	Tyler Hill	Hill Motorsports	Chevrolet
68	Clay Greenfield	Clay Greenfield Motorsports	Toyota
75	Parker Kligerman	Henderson Motorsports	Chevrolet
83	Ray Ciccarelli	CMI Motorsports	Chevrolet
88	Matt Crafton	ThorSport Racing	Ford
98	Grant Enfinger	ThorSport Racing	Ford
99	Ben Rhodes	ThorSport Racing	Ford
Official entry list

*Withdrew due to Davis having a positive COVID-19 test.

== Qualifying ==
Qualifying was determined by a random draw. Chandler Smith of Kyle Busch Motorsports would draw the pole.

Pos.	#	Driver	Team	Make
1	51	Chandler Smith	Kyle Busch Motorsports	Toyota
2	23	Brett Moffitt	GMS Racing	Chevrolet
3	18	Christian Eckes	Kyle Busch Motorsports	Toyota
4	88	Matt Crafton	ThorSport Racing	Ford
5	16	Austin Hill	Hattori Racing Enterprises	Toyota
6	98	Grant Enfinger	ThorSport Racing	Ford
7	21	Zane Smith	GMS Racing	Chevrolet
8	2	Sheldon Creed	GMS Racing	Chevrolet
9	19	Derek Kraus	McAnally–Hilgemann Racing	Toyota
10	99	Ben Rhodes	ThorSport Racing	Ford
11	4	Raphaël Lessard	Kyle Busch Motorsports	Toyota
12	24	David Gravel	GMS Racing	Chevrolet
13	13	Johnny Sauter	ThorSport Racing	Ford
14	26	Tyler Ankrum	GMS Racing	Chevrolet
15	44	Jeb Burton	Niece Motorsports	Chevrolet
16	15	Tanner Gray	DGR-Crosley	Ford
17	30	Brennan Poole	On Point Motorsports	Toyota
18	45	Ty Majeski	Niece Motorsports	Chevrolet
19	38	Todd Gilliland	Front Row Motorsports	Ford
20	40	Ryan Truex	Niece Motorsports	Chevrolet
21	52	Stewart Friesen	Halmar Friesen Racing	Toyota
22	68	Clay Greenfield	Clay Greenfield Motorsports	Toyota
23	33	Jesse Iwuji	Reaume Brothers Racing	Toyota
24	3	Jordan Anderson	Jordan Anderson Racing	Chevrolet
25	02	Tate Fogleman	Young's Motorsports	Chevrolet
26	9	Codie Rohrbaugh	CR7 Motorsports	Chevrolet
27	22	Austin Wayne Self	AM Racing	Chevrolet
28	04	Cory Roper	Roper Racing	Ford
29	00	Josh Reaume	Reaume Brothers Racing	Toyota
30	56	Tyler Hill	Hill Motorsports	Chevrolet
31	20	Spencer Boyd	Young's Motorsports	Chevrolet
32	49	Tim Viens	CMI Motorsports	Chevrolet
33	10	Jennifer Jo Cobb	Jennifer Jo Cobb Racing	Chevrolet
34	8	John Hunter Nemechek	NEMCO Motorsports	Ford
35	75	Parker Kligerman	Henderson Motorsports	Chevrolet
36	6	Norm Benning	Norm Benning Racing	Chevrolet
37	83	Ray Ciccarelli	CMI Motorsports	Chevrolet
38	55	Dawson Cram	Long Motorsports	Chevrolet
39	14	Trey Hutchens	Trey Hutchens Racing	Chevrolet
Failed to qualify or withdrew
WD	11	Spencer Davis	Spencer Davis Motorsports	Toyota
41	17	David Ragan	DGR-Crosley	Ford
Official starting lineup

== Race results ==
Stage 1 Laps: 20

Fin	#	Driver	Team	Make	Pts
1	23	Brett Moffitt	GMS Racing	Chevrolet	10
2	2	Sheldon Creed	GMS Racing	Chevrolet	9
3	99	Ben Rhodes	ThorSport Racing	Ford	8
4	88	Matt Crafton	ThorSport Racing	Ford	7
5	19	Derek Kraus	McAnally–Hilgemann Racing	Toyota	6
6	16	Austin Hill	Hattori Racing Enterprises	Toyota	5
7	98	Grant Enfinger	ThorSport Racing	Ford	4
8	52	Stewart Friesen	Halmar Friesen Racing	Toyota	3
9	21	Zane Smith	GMS Racing	Chevrolet	2
10	51	Chandler Smith	Kyle Busch Motorsports	Toyota	1

Stage 2 Laps: 20

Fin	#	Driver	Team	Make	Pts
1	13	Johnny Sauter	ThorSport Racing	Ford	10
2	23	Brett Moffitt	GMS Racing	Chevrolet	9
3	38	Todd Gilliland	Front Row Motorsports	Ford	8
4	98	Grant Enfinger	ThorSport Racing	Ford	7
5	15	Tanner Gray	DGR-Crosley	Ford	6
6	2	Sheldon Creed	GMS Racing	Chevrolet	5
7	16	Austin Hill	Hattori Racing Enterprises	Toyota	4
8	8	John Hunter Nemechek	NEMCO Motorsports	Ford	0
9	75	Parker Kligerman	Henderson Motorsports	Chevrolet	2
10	19	Derek Kraus	McAnally–Hilgemann Racing	Toyota	1

Stage 3 Laps: 67

Fin	St	#	Driver	Team	Make	Laps	Led	Status	Pts
1	7	21	Zane Smith	GMS Racing	Chevrolet	107	1	running	42
2	3	18	Christian Eckes	Kyle Busch Motorsports	Toyota	107	1	running	35
3	16	15	Tanner Gray	DGR-Crosley	Ford	107	0	running	40
4	14	26	Tyler Ankrum	GMS Racing	Chevrolet	107	0	running	33
5	19	38	Todd Gilliland	Front Row Motorsports	Ford	107	0	running	40
6	2	23	Brett Moffitt	GMS Racing	Chevrolet	107	20	running	50
7	11	4	Raphaël Lessard	Kyle Busch Motorsports	Toyota	107	4	running	30
8	9	19	Derek Kraus	McAnally–Hilgemann Racing	Toyota	107	0	running	36
9	35	75	Parker Kligerman	Henderson Motorsports	Chevrolet	107	0	running	30
10	12	24	David Gravel	GMS Racing	Chevrolet	107	0	running	0
11	10	99	Ben Rhodes	ThorSport Racing	Ford	107	0	running	34
12	5	16	Austin Hill	Hattori Racing Enterprises	Toyota	107	11	running	34
13	25	02	Tate Fogleman	Young's Motorsports	Chevrolet	107	0	running	24
14	38	55	Dawson Cram	Long Motorsports	Chevrolet	107	3	running	23
15	18	45	Ty Majeski	Niece Motorsports	Chevrolet	107	0	running	22
16	13	13	Johnny Sauter	ThorSport Racing	Ford	107	18	running	31
17	29	00	Josh Reaume	Reaume Brothers Racing	Toyota	107	1	running	20
18	26	9	Codie Rohrbaugh	CR7 Motorsports	Chevrolet	107	0	running	19
19	20	40	Ryan Truex	Niece Motorsports	Chevrolet	107	0	running	18
20	22	68	Clay Greenfield	Clay Greenfield Motorsports	Toyota	107	0	running	17
21	30	56	Tyler Hill	Hill Motorsports	Chevrolet	107	0	running	16
22	23	33	Jesse Iwuji	Reaume Brothers Racing	Toyota	107	0	running	15
23	4	88	Matt Crafton	ThorSport Racing	Ford	107	0	running	21
24	28	04	Cory Roper	Roper Racing	Ford	107	0	running	13
25	34	8	John Hunter Nemechek	NEMCO Motorsports	Ford	107	2	running	0
26	32	49	Tim Viens	CMI Motorsports	Chevrolet	107	0	running	11
27	31	20	Spencer Boyd	Young's Motorsports	Chevrolet	107	0	running	10
28	33	10	Jennifer Jo Cobb	Jennifer Jo Cobb Racing	Chevrolet	107	0	running	9
29	39	14	Trey Hutchens	Trey Hutchens Racing	Chevrolet	107	0	running	8
30	8	2	Sheldon Creed	GMS Racing	Chevrolet	106	1	running	21
31	36	6	Norm Benning	Norm Benning Racing	Chevrolet	106	0	running	6
32	24	3	Jordan Anderson	Jordan Anderson Racing	Chevrolet	106	0	running	5
33	6	98	Grant Enfinger	ThorSport Racing	Ford	105	38	running	16
34	37	83	Ray Ciccarelli	CMI Motorsports	Chevrolet	103	0	running	5
35	17	30	Brennan Poole	On Point Motorsports	Toyota	100	0	crash	0
36	15	44	Jeb Burton	Niece Motorsports	Chevrolet	99	0	crash	0
37	27	22	Austin Wayne Self	AM Racing	Chevrolet	96	0	running	5
38	1	51	Chandler Smith	Kyle Busch Motorsports	Toyota	59	4	crash	6
39	21	52	Stewart Friesen	Halmar Friesen Racing	Toyota	49	0	crash	8
Official race results

Previous race: 2020 E.P.T. 200	NASCAR Gander RV & Outdoors Truck Series; 2020 season	Next race: 2020 Sunoco 159
