= 2020 Buckle Up in Your Truck 225 =

2020 Buckle Up in Your Truck 225 presented by Click It or Ticket
Race details
- Race 7 of 23 of the 2020 NASCAR Gander RV & Outdoors Truck Series
- Date: July 11, 2020
- Official name: Buckle Up in Your Truck 225 presented by Click It or Ticket
- Location: Sparta, Kentucky, Kentucky Speedway
- Course: Permanent racing facility
- Course length: 1.5 miles (2.41 km)
- Distance: 71 laps, 106.5 mi (171.394 km)
- Scheduled distance: 150 laps, 225 mi (362.102 km)
- Average speed: 97.956 miles per hour (157.645 km/h)

Pole position
| Driver | Brett Moffitt | GMS Racing |
- Grid positions set by ballot

Most laps led
| Driver | Brett Moffitt | GMS Racing |
- Laps: 26

Winner
| No. 2 | Sheldon Creed | GMS Racing |

Television in the United States
- Network: Fox Sports 1
- Announcers: Vince Welch, Phil Parsons, and Michael Waltrip

Radio in the United States
- Radio: Motor Racing Network

The 2020 Buckle Up in Your Truck 225 presented by Click It or Ticket was the 7th stock car race of the 2020 NASCAR Gander RV & Outdoors Truck Series season, and the 10th running of the event. The race was held on Saturday, July 11, 2020, in Sparta, Kentucky, at Kentucky Speedway, a 1.5 miles (2.4 km) permanent D-shaped oval racetrack. The race was shortened from 150 laps to 71 due to rain during the race. Sheldon Creed of GMS Racing would win the 2nd stage, and rain would stop the race before the green for the final stage, making him the winner, garnering the first ever win of his career. To fill out the podium, Ben Rhodes and Matt Crafton, both from ThorSport Racing, would finish 2nd and 3rd, respectively.

== Background ==
The layout of Kentucky Speedway, the venue where the race was held.

Kentucky Speedway is a 1.5-mile (2.4 km) tri-oval speedway in Sparta, Kentucky, which has hosted ARCA, NASCAR and Indy Racing League racing annually since it opened in 2000. The track is currently owned and operated by Speedway Motorsports, Inc. and Jerry Carroll, who, along with four other investors, owned Kentucky Speedway until 2008. The speedway has a grandstand capacity of 117,000. Construction of the speedway began in 1998 and was completed in mid-2000. The speedway has formerly hosted NASCAR and IndyCar races.

The race was held without fans in attendance due to the ongoing COVID-19 pandemic.

| # | Driver | Team | Make |
|---|---|---|---|
| 00 | Angela Ruch | Reaume Brothers Racing | Toyota |
| 2 | Sheldon Creed | GMS Racing | Chevrolet |
| 02 | Tate Fogleman | Young's Motorsports | Chevrolet |
| 3 | Jordan Anderson | Jordan Anderson Racing | Chevrolet |
| 4 | Raphaël Lessard | Kyle Busch Motorsports | Toyota |
| 04 | Cory Roper | Roper Racing | Ford |
| 6 | Norm Benning | Norm Benning Racing | Chevrolet |
| 7 | Korbin Forrister | All Out Motorsports | Toyota |
| 9 | Codie Rohrbaugh | CR7 Motorsports | Chevrolet |
| 10 | Jennifer Jo Cobb | Jennifer Jo Cobb Racing | Chevrolet |
| 11 | Spencer Davis | Spencer Davis Motorsports | Toyota |
| 13 | Johnny Sauter | ThorSport Racing | Ford |
| 14 | Trey Hutchens | Trey Hutchens Racing | Chevrolet |
| 15 | Tanner Gray | DGR-Crosley | Ford |
| 16 | Austin Hill | Hattori Racing Enterprises | Toyota |
| 18 | Christian Eckes | Kyle Busch Motorsports | Toyota |
| 19 | Derek Kraus | McAnally–Hilgemann Racing | Toyota |
| 20 | Spencer Boyd | Young's Motorsports | Chevrolet |
| 21 | Zane Smith | GMS Racing | Chevrolet |
| 22 | Austin Wayne Self | AM Racing | Chevrolet |
| 23 | Brett Moffitt | GMS Racing | Chevrolet |
| 24 | Chase Purdy | GMS Racing | Chevrolet |
| 26 | Tyler Ankrum | GMS Racing | Chevrolet |
| 30 | Brennan Poole | On Point Motorsports | Toyota |
| 33 | Bryant Barnhill | Reaume Brothers Racing | Toyota |
| 38 | Todd Gilliland | Front Row Motorsports | Ford |
| 40 | Ryan Truex | Niece Motorsports | Chevrolet |
| 44 | Natalie Decker | Niece Motorsports | Chevrolet |
| 45 | Ty Majeski | Niece Motorsports | Chevrolet |
| 49 | Tim Viens | CMI Motorsports | Chevrolet |
| 51 | Chandler Smith | Kyle Busch Motorsports | Toyota |
| 52 | Stewart Friesen | Halmar Friesen Racing | Toyota |
| 55 | Dawson Cram | Long Motorsports | Chevrolet |
| 56 | Tyler Hill | Hill Motorsports | Chevrolet |
| 68 | Clay Greenfield | Clay Greenfield Motorsports | Toyota |
| 75 | Parker Kligerman | Henderson Motorsports | Chevrolet |
| 83 | Ray Ciccarelli | CMI Motorsports | Chevrolet |
| 88 | Matt Crafton | ThorSport Racing | Ford |
| 98 | Grant Enfinger | ThorSport Racing | Ford |
| 99 | Ben Rhodes | ThorSport Racing | Ford |
Official entry list

== Starting lineup ==
The starting lineup was based on a random draw. Brett Moffitt of GMS Racing was drawn to start on pole for the event.

| Pos | # | Driver | Team | Make |
|---|---|---|---|---|
| 1 | 23 | Brett Moffitt | GMS Racing | Chevrolet |
| 2 | 21 | Zane Smith | GMS Racing | Chevrolet |
| 3 | 26 | Tyler Ankrum | GMS Racing | Chevrolet |
| 4 | 18 | Christian Eckes | Kyle Busch Motorsports | Toyota |
| 5 | 16 | Austin Hill | Hattori Racing Enterprises | Toyota |
| 6 | 99 | Ben Rhodes | ThorSport Racing | Ford |
| 7 | 98 | Grant Enfinger | ThorSport Racing | Ford |
| 8 | 2 | Sheldon Creed | GMS Racing | Chevrolet |
| 9 | 38 | Todd Gilliland | Front Row Motorsports | Ford |
| 10 | 51 | Chandler Smith | Kyle Busch Motorsports | Toyota |
| 11 | 13 | Johnny Sauter | ThorSport Racing | Ford |
| 12 | 52 | Stewart Friesen | Halmar Friesen Racing | Toyota |
| 13 | 4 | Raphaël Lessard | Kyle Busch Motorsports | Toyota |
| 14 | 88 | Matt Crafton | ThorSport Racing | Ford |
| 15 | 44 | Natalie Decker | Niece Motorsports | Chevrolet |
| 16 | 45 | Ty Majeski | Niece Motorsports | Chevrolet |
| 17 | 19 | Derek Kraus | McAnally–Hilgemann Racing | Toyota |
| 18 | 40 | Ryan Truex | Niece Motorsports | Chevrolet |
| 19 | 24 | Chase Purdy | GMS Racing | Chevrolet |
| 20 | 9 | Codie Rohrbaugh | CR7 Motorsports | Chevrolet |
| 21 | 15 | Tanner Gray | DGR-Crosley | Ford |
| 22 | 7 | Korbin Forrister | All Out Motorsports | Toyota |
| 23 | 00 | Angela Ruch | Reaume Brothers Racing | Toyota |
| 24 | 33 | Bryant Barnhill | Reaume Brothers Racing | Toyota |
| 25 | 02 | Tate Fogleman | Young's Motorsports | Chevrolet |
| 26 | 56 | Tyler Hill | Hill Motorsports | Chevrolet |
| 27 | 22 | Austin Wayne Self | AM Racing | Chevrolet |
| 28 | 3 | Jordan Anderson | Jordan Anderson Racing | Chevrolet |
| 29 | 20 | Spencer Boyd | Young's Motorsports | Chevrolet |
| 30 | 04 | Cory Roper | Roper Racing | Ford |
| 31 | 11 | Spencer Davis | Spencer Davis Motorsports | Toyota |
| 32 | 30 | Brennan Poole | On Point Motorsports | Toyota |
| 33 | 68 | Clay Greenfield | Clay Greenfield Motorsports | Toyota |
| 34 | 49 | Tim Viens | CMI Motorsports | Chevrolet |
| 35 | 10 | Jennifer Jo Cobb | Jennifer Jo Cobb Racing | Chevrolet |
| 36 | 83 | Ray Ciccarelli | CMI Motorsports | Chevrolet |
| 37 | 75 | Parker Kligerman | Henderson Motorsports | Chevrolet |
| 38 | 6 | Norm Benning | Norm Benning Racing | Chevrolet |
| 39 | 55 | Dawson Cram | Long Motorsports | Chevrolet |
| 40 | 14 | Trey Hutchens | Trey Hutchens Racing | Chevrolet |
Official starting lineup

== Race results ==
Stage 1 Laps: 35

| Fin | # | Driver | Team | Make | Pts |
|---|---|---|---|---|---|
| 1 | 21 | Zane Smith | GMS Racing | Chevrolet | 10 |
| 2 | 23 | Brett Moffitt | GMS Racing | Chevrolet | 9 |
| 3 | 2 | Sheldon Creed | GMS Racing | Chevrolet | 8 |
| 4 | 18 | Christian Eckes | Kyle Busch Motorsports | Toyota | 7 |
| 5 | 26 | Tyler Ankrum | GMS Racing | Chevrolet | 6 |
| 6 | 38 | Todd Gilliland | Front Row Motorsports | Ford | 5 |
| 7 | 88 | Matt Crafton | ThorSport Racing | Ford | 4 |
| 8 | 19 | Derek Kraus | McAnally–Hilgemann Racing | Toyota | 3 |
| 9 | 16 | Austin Hill | Hattori Racing Enterprises | Toyota | 2 |
| 10 | 11 | Spencer Davis | Spencer Davis Motorsports | Toyota | 1 |

Stage 2 Laps: 35

| Fin | # | Driver | Team | Make | Pts |
|---|---|---|---|---|---|
| 1 | 2 | Sheldon Creed | GMS Racing | Chevrolet | 10 |
| 2 | 99 | Ben Rhodes | ThorSport Racing | Ford | 9 |
| 3 | 88 | Matt Crafton | ThorSport Racing | Ford | 8 |
| 4 | 13 | Johnny Sauter | ThorSport Racing | Ford | 7 |
| 5 | 16 | Austin Hill | Hattori Racing Enterprises | Toyota | 6 |
| 6 | 18 | Christian Eckes | Kyle Busch Motorsports | Toyota | 5 |
| 7 | 21 | Zane Smith | GMS Racing | Chevrolet | 4 |
| 8 | 19 | Derek Kraus | McAnally–Hilgemann Racing | Toyota | 3 |
| 9 | 15 | Tanner Gray | DGR-Crosley | Ford | 2 |
| 10 | 38 | Todd Gilliland | Front Row Motorsports | Ford | 1 |

Stage 3 Laps: 1

| Fin | St | # | Driver | Team | Make | Laps | Led | Status | Pts |
|---|---|---|---|---|---|---|---|---|---|
| 1 | 8 | 2 | Sheldon Creed | GMS Racing | Chevrolet | 71 | 20 | running | 58 |
| 2 | 6 | 99 | Ben Rhodes | ThorSport Racing | Ford | 71 | 6 | running | 44 |
| 3 | 14 | 88 | Matt Crafton | ThorSport Racing | Ford | 71 | 1 | running | 42 |
| 4 | 11 | 13 | Johnny Sauter | ThorSport Racing | Ford | 71 | 0 | running | 40 |
| 5 | 5 | 16 | Austin Hill | Hattori Racing Enterprises | Toyota | 71 | 0 | running | 40 |
| 6 | 4 | 18 | Christian Eckes | Kyle Busch Motorsports | Toyota | 71 | 0 | running | 43 |
| 7 | 2 | 21 | Zane Smith | GMS Racing | Chevrolet | 71 | 11 | running | 44 |
| 8 | 17 | 19 | Derek Kraus | McAnally–Hilgemann Racing | Toyota | 71 | 0 | running | 35 |
| 9 | 21 | 15 | Tanner Gray | DGR-Crosley | Ford | 71 | 0 | running | 30 |
| 10 | 9 | 38 | Todd Gilliland | Front Row Motorsports | Ford | 71 | 0 | running | 33 |
| 11 | 1 | 23 | Brett Moffitt | GMS Racing | Chevrolet | 71 | 26 | running | 35 |
| 12 | 7 | 98 | Grant Enfinger | ThorSport Racing | Ford | 71 | 0 | running | 29 |
| 13 | 13 | 4 | Raphaël Lessard | Kyle Busch Motorsports | Toyota | 71 | 0 | running | 24 |
| 14 | 31 | 11 | Spencer Davis | Spencer Davis Motorsports | Toyota | 71 | 0 | running | 24 |
| 15 | 12 | 52 | Stewart Friesen | Halmar Friesen Racing | Toyota | 71 | 0 | running | 22 |
| 16 | 3 | 26 | Tyler Ankrum | GMS Racing | Chevrolet | 71 | 0 | running | 27 |
| 17 | 32 | 30 | Brennan Poole | On Point Motorsports | Toyota | 71 | 0 | running | 0 |
| 18 | 37 | 75 | Parker Kligerman | Henderson Motorsports | Chevrolet | 71 | 7 | running | 19 |
| 19 | 16 | 45 | Ty Majeski | Niece Motorsports | Chevrolet | 71 | 0 | running | 18 |
| 20 | 27 | 22 | Austin Wayne Self | AM Racing | Chevrolet | 71 | 0 | running | 17 |
| 21 | 25 | 02 | Tate Fogleman | Young's Motorsports | Chevrolet | 71 | 0 | running | 16 |
| 22 | 10 | 51 | Chandler Smith | Kyle Busch Motorsports | Toyota | 71 | 0 | running | 15 |
| 23 | 30 | 04 | Cory Roper | Roper Racing | Ford | 71 | 0 | running | 14 |
| 24 | 28 | 3 | Jordan Anderson | Jordan Anderson Racing | Chevrolet | 71 | 0 | running | 13 |
| 25 | 23 | 00 | Angela Ruch | Reaume Brothers Racing | Toyota | 71 | 0 | running | 12 |
| 26 | 33 | 68 | Clay Greenfield | Clay Greenfield Motorsports | Toyota | 71 | 0 | running | 11 |
| 27 | 18 | 40 | Ryan Truex | Niece Motorsports | Chevrolet | 71 | 0 | running | 10 |
| 28 | 39 | 55 | Dawson Cram | Long Motorsports | Chevrolet | 70 | 0 | running | 9 |
| 29 | 15 | 44 | Natalie Decker | Niece Motorsports | Chevrolet | 70 | 0 | running | 8 |
| 30 | 26 | 56 | Tyler Hill | Hill Motorsports | Chevrolet | 70 | 0 | running | 7 |
| 31 | 19 | 24 | Chase Purdy | GMS Racing | Chevrolet | 70 | 0 | running | 6 |
| 32 | 36 | 83 | Ray Ciccarelli | CMI Motorsports | Chevrolet | 70 | 0 | running | 5 |
| 33 | 24 | 33 | Bryant Barnhill | Reaume Brothers Racing | Toyota | 69 | 0 | running | 5 |
| 34 | 22 | 7 | Korbin Forrister | All Out Motorsports | Toyota | 69 | 0 | running | 5 |
| 35 | 34 | 49 | Tim Viens | CMI Motorsports | Chevrolet | 55 | 0 | handling | 5 |
| 36 | 40 | 14 | Trey Hutchens | Trey Hutchens Racing | Chevrolet | 50 | 0 | crash | 5 |
| 37 | 35 | 10 | Jennifer Jo Cobb | Jennifer Jo Cobb Racing | Chevrolet | 48 | 0 | crash | 5 |
| 38 | 29 | 20 | Spencer Boyd | Young's Motorsports | Chevrolet | 46 | 0 | running | 5 |
| 39 | 20 | 9 | Codie Rohrbaugh | CR7 Motorsports | Chevrolet | 13 | 0 | crash | 5 |
| 40 | 38 | 6 | Norm Benning | Norm Benning Racing | Chevrolet | 13 | 0 | engine | 5 |
Official race results

| Previous race: 2020 Pocono Organics 150 | NASCAR Gander RV & Outdoors Truck Series; 2020 season | Next race: 2020 Vankor 350 |
