= 2020 World of Westgate 200 =

Race details
- Race 18 of 23 of the 2020 NASCAR Gander RV & Outdoors Truck Series
- Date: September 25, 2020
- Official name: World of Westgate 200
- Location: North Las Vegas, Nevada, Las Vegas Motor Speedway
- Course: Permanent racing facility
- Course length: 1.5 miles (2.41 km)
- Distance: 134 laps, 201 mi (323.477 km)
- Average speed: 119.861 miles per hour (192.898 km/h)

Pole position
Driver	Brett Moffitt	GMS Racing
- Grid positions set by competition-based formula

Most laps led
Driver	Sheldon Creed	GMS Racing
- Laps: 89

Winner
No. 16	Austin Hill	Hattori Racing Enterprises

Television in the United States
- Network: Fox Sports 1
- Announcers: Vince Welch, Michael Waltrip, and Kurt Busch

Radio in the United States
- Radio: Motor Racing Network

The 2020 World of Westgate 200 was the 18th stock car race of the 2020 NASCAR Gander RV & Outdoors Truck Series season, the 3rd iteration of the event, and the second race of the Round of 10 in the Playoffs. The race was held on Friday, September 25, 2020, in North Las Vegas, Nevada at Las Vegas Motor Speedway, a 1.5 miles (2.4 km) permanent D-shaped oval racetrack. The race took the scheduled 134 laps to complete. At race's end, Austin Hill of Hattori Racing Enterprises would take control on the final restart of the race and would held off Sheldon Creed to win the race, the 6th NASCAR Gander RV & Outdoors Truck Series win of his career and the 2nd and final win of the season. To fill out the podium, Sheldon Creed of GMS Racing and Tanner Gray of GMS Racing would finish 2nd and 3rd, respectively.

The race was the debut in the NASCAR Gander RV & Outdoors Truck Series for IndyCar driver Conor Daly.

== Background ==
The layout of Las Vegas Motor Speedway, the venue where the race was held.

Las Vegas Motor Speedway, located in Clark County, Nevada outside the Las Vegas city limits and about 15 miles northeast of the Las Vegas Strip, is a 1,200-acre (490 ha) complex of multiple tracks for motorsports racing. The complex is owned by Speedway Motorsports.

=== Entry list ===
#	Driver	Team	Make
00	Josh Reaume	Reaume Brothers Racing	Toyota
2	Sheldon Creed	GMS Racing	Chevrolet
02	Tate Fogleman	Young's Motorsports	Chevrolet
3	Jordan Anderson	Jordan Anderson Racing	Chevrolet
4	Raphaël Lessard	Kyle Busch Motorsports	Toyota
10	Jennifer Jo Cobb	Jennifer Jo Cobb Racing	Chevrolet
11	Spencer Davis	Spencer Davis Motorsports	Toyota
13	Johnny Sauter	ThorSport Racing	Ford
15	Tanner Gray	DGR-Crosley	Ford
16	Austin Hill	Hattori Racing Enterprises	Toyota
17	Dylan Lupton	DGR-Crosley	Ford
18	Christian Eckes	Kyle Busch Motorsports	Toyota
19	Derek Kraus	McAnally–Hilgemann Racing	Toyota
20	Spencer Boyd	Young's Motorsports	Chevrolet
21	Zane Smith	GMS Racing	Chevrolet
22	Austin Wayne Self	AM Racing	Chevrolet
23	Brett Moffitt	GMS Racing	Chevrolet
24	Chase Purdy	GMS Racing	Chevrolet
26	Tyler Ankrum	GMS Racing	Chevrolet
30	Danny Bohn	On Point Motorsports	Toyota
33	Jesse Iwuji	Reaume Brothers Racing	Toyota
38	Todd Gilliland	Front Row Motorsports	Ford
40	Ryan Truex	Niece Motorsports	Chevrolet
41	Dawson Cram	Cram Racing Enterprises	Chevrolet
42	Conor Daly	Niece Motorsports	Chevrolet
44	Natalie Decker	Niece Motorsports	Chevrolet
45	Travis Pastrana	Niece Motorsports	Chevrolet
49	Ray Ciccarelli	CMI Motorsports	Chevrolet
51	Chandler Smith	Kyle Busch Motorsports	Toyota
52	Stewart Friesen	Halmar Friesen Racing	Toyota
56	Tyler Hill	Hill Motorsports	Chevrolet
68	Clay Greenfield	Clay Greenfield Motorsports	Toyota
83	Tim Viens	CMI Motorsports	Chevrolet
88	Matt Crafton	ThorSport Racing	Ford
98	Grant Enfinger	ThorSport Racing	Ford
99	Ben Rhodes	ThorSport Racing	Ford
Official entry list

== Starting lineup ==
The starting lineup was determined by a metric qualifying system based on the fastest lap and results of the last race, the 2020 UNOH 200, and owner's points. As a result, Brett Moffitt of GMS Racing won the pole.

Pos.	#	Driver	Team	Make
1	23	Brett Moffitt	GMS Racing	Chevrolet
2	26	Tyler Ankrum	GMS Racing	Chevrolet
3	98	Grant Enfinger	ThorSport Racing	Ford
4	2	Sheldon Creed	GMS Racing	Chevrolet
5	51	Chandler Smith	Kyle Busch Motorsports	Toyota
6	88	Matt Crafton	ThorSport Racing	Ford
7	21	Zane Smith	GMS Racing	Chevrolet
8	99	Ben Rhodes	ThorSport Racing	Ford
9	18	Christian Eckes	Kyle Busch Motorsports	Toyota
10	38	Todd Gilliland	Front Row Motorsports	Ford
11	16	Austin Hill	Hattori Racing Enterprises	Toyota
12	15	Tanner Gray	DGR-Crosley	Ford
13	13	Johnny Sauter	ThorSport Racing	Ford
14	19	Derek Kraus	McAnally–Hilgemann Racing	Toyota
15	4	Raphaël Lessard	Kyle Busch Motorsports	Toyota
16	24	Chase Purdy	GMS Racing	Chevrolet
17	52	Stewart Friesen	Halmar Friesen Racing	Toyota
18	02	Tate Fogleman	Young's Motorsports	Chevrolet
19	30	Danny Bohn	On Point Motorsports	Toyota
20	3	Jordan Anderson	Jordan Anderson Racing	Chevrolet
21	68	Clay Greenfield	Clay Greenfield Motorsports	Toyota
22	44	Natalie Decker	Niece Motorsports	Chevrolet
23	40	Ryan Truex	Niece Motorsports	Chevrolet
24	20	Spencer Boyd	Young's Motorsports	Chevrolet
25	22	Austin Wayne Self	AM Racing	Chevrolet
26	56	Tyler Hill	Hill Motorsports	Chevrolet
27	42	Conor Daly	Niece Motorsports	Chevrolet
28	10	Jennifer Jo Cobb	Jennifer Jo Cobb Racing	Chevrolet
29	45	Travis Pastrana	Niece Motorsports	Chevrolet
30	00	Josh Reaume	Reaume Brothers Racing	Toyota
31	33	Jesse Iwuji	Reaume Brothers Racing	Toyota
32	11	Spencer Davis	Spencer Davis Motorsports	Toyota
33	41	Dawson Cram	Cram Racing Enterprises	Chevrolet
34	17	Dylan Lupton	DGR-Crosley	Ford
35	49	Ray Ciccarelli	CMI Motorsports	Chevrolet
36	83	Tim Viens	CMI Motorsports	Chevrolet
Official starting lineup

== Race results ==
Stage 1 Laps: 30

Fin	#	Driver	Team	Make	Pts
1	2	Sheldon Creed	GMS Racing	Chevrolet	10
2	23	Brett Moffitt	GMS Racing	Chevrolet	9
3	19	Derek Kraus	McAnally–Hilgemann Racing	Toyota	8
4	98	Grant Enfinger	ThorSport Racing	Ford	7
5	21	Zane Smith	GMS Racing	Chevrolet	6
6	99	Ben Rhodes	ThorSport Racing	Ford	5
7	18	Christian Eckes	Kyle Busch Motorsports	Toyota	4
8	15	Tanner Gray	DGR-Crosley	Ford	3
9	88	Matt Crafton	ThorSport Racing	Ford	2
10	51	Chandler Smith	Kyle Busch Motorsports	Toyota	1

Stage 2 Laps: 30

Fin	#	Driver	Team	Make	Pts
1	2	Sheldon Creed	GMS Racing	Chevrolet	10
2	21	Zane Smith	GMS Racing	Chevrolet	9
3	23	Brett Moffitt	GMS Racing	Chevrolet	8
4	19	Derek Kraus	McAnally–Hilgemann Racing	Toyota	7
5	99	Ben Rhodes	ThorSport Racing	Ford	6
6	13	Johnny Sauter	ThorSport Racing	Ford	5
7	18	Christian Eckes	Kyle Busch Motorsports	Toyota	4
8	88	Matt Crafton	ThorSport Racing	Ford	3
9	16	Austin Hill	Hattori Racing Enterprises	Toyota	2
10	15	Tanner Gray	DGR-Crosley	Ford	1

Stage 3 Laps: 74

Fin	St	#	Driver	Team	Make	Laps	Led	Status	Pts
1	11	16	Austin Hill	Hattori Racing Enterprises	Toyota	134	39	running	42
2	4	2	Sheldon Creed	GMS Racing	Chevrolet	134	89	running	55
3	12	15	Tanner Gray	DGR-Crosley	Ford	134	0	running	38
4	17	52	Stewart Friesen	Halmar Friesen Racing	Toyota	134	0	running	33
5	5	51	Chandler Smith	Kyle Busch Motorsports	Toyota	134	0	running	33
6	3	98	Grant Enfinger	ThorSport Racing	Ford	134	0	running	38
7	7	21	Zane Smith	GMS Racing	Chevrolet	134	0	running	45
8	9	18	Christian Eckes	Kyle Busch Motorsports	Toyota	134	5	running	37
9	6	88	Matt Crafton	ThorSport Racing	Ford	134	0	running	33
10	2	26	Tyler Ankrum	GMS Racing	Chevrolet	134	0	running	27
11	13	13	Johnny Sauter	ThorSport Racing	Ford	134	0	running	31
12	23	40	Ryan Truex	Niece Motorsports	Chevrolet	134	0	running	25
13	10	38	Todd Gilliland	Front Row Motorsports	Ford	134	0	running	24
14	34	17	Dylan Lupton	DGR-Crosley	Ford	134	0	running	23
15	1	23	Brett Moffitt	GMS Racing	Chevrolet	134	1	running	39
16	18	02	Tate Fogleman	Young's Motorsports	Chevrolet	134	0	running	21
17	26	56	Tyler Hill	Hill Motorsports	Chevrolet	134	0	running	20
18	27	42	Conor Daly	Niece Motorsports	Chevrolet	133	0	running	19
19	32	11	Spencer Davis	Spencer Davis Motorsports	Toyota	133	0	running	18
20	15	4	Raphaël Lessard	Kyle Busch Motorsports	Toyota	133	0	running	17
21	29	45	Travis Pastrana	Niece Motorsports	Chevrolet	133	0	running	16
22	21	68	Clay Greenfield	Clay Greenfield Motorsports	Toyota	133	0	running	15
23	8	99	Ben Rhodes	ThorSport Racing	Ford	132	0	running	25
24	25	22	Austin Wayne Self	AM Racing	Chevrolet	132	0	running	13
25	19	30	Danny Bohn	On Point Motorsports	Toyota	132	0	running	12
26	35	49	Ray Ciccarelli	CMI Motorsports	Chevrolet	131	0	running	11
27	16	24	Chase Purdy	GMS Racing	Chevrolet	131	0	running	10
28	24	20	Spencer Boyd	Young's Motorsports	Chevrolet	129	0	running	9
29	30	00	Josh Reaume	Reaume Brothers Racing	Toyota	127	0	running	8
30	14	19	Derek Kraus	McAnally–Hilgemann Racing	Toyota	125	0	running	22
31	31	33	Jesse Iwuji	Reaume Brothers Racing	Toyota	115	0	running	6
32	20	3	Jordan Anderson	Jordan Anderson Racing	Chevrolet	85	0	track bar	5
33	36	83	Tim Viens	CMI Motorsports	Chevrolet	69	0	too slow	5
34	28	10	Jennifer Jo Cobb	Jennifer Jo Cobb Racing	Chevrolet	62	0	oil tank	5
35	33	41	Dawson Cram	Cram Racing Enterprises	Chevrolet	16	0	crash	5
36	22	44	Natalie Decker	Niece Motorsports	Chevrolet	0	0	fatigue	5
Official race results

Previous race: 2020 UNOH 200	NASCAR Gander RV & Outdoors Truck Series; 2020 season	Next race: 2020 Chevrolet Silverado 250
