= 2020 Vankor 350 =

Race details
- Race 8 of 23 of the 2020 NASCAR Gander RV & Outdoors Truck Series
- Date: July 18, 2020
- Official name: Vankor 350
- Location: Fort Worth, Texas, Texas Motor Speedway
- Course: Permanent racing facility
- Course length: 1.5 miles (2.41 km)
- Distance: 167 laps, 250.5 mi (403.14 km)
- Scheduled distance: 167 laps, 250.5 mi (403.14 km)
- Average speed: 132.209 miles per hour (212.770 km/h)

Pole position
Driver	Sheldon Creed	GMS Racing
- Grid positions set by ballot

Most laps led
Driver	Kyle Busch	Kyle Busch Motorsports
- Laps: 72

Winner
No. 51	Kyle Busch	Kyle Busch Motorsports

Television in the United States
- Network: Fox Sports 1
- Announcers: Vince Welch, Michael Waltrip, and Regan Smith

Radio in the United States
- Radio: Motor Racing Network

The 2020 Vankor 350 was the 8th stock car race of the 2020 NASCAR Gander RV & Outdoors Truck Series season, and the 22nd iteration of the event. The race was held on Saturday, July 18, 2020 in Fort Worth, Texas at Texas Motor Speedway, a 1.5 miles (2.4 km) permanent tri-oval shaped racetrack. The race took the scheduled 167 laps to complete. At race's end, Kyle Busch, driving for his own team, Kyle Busch Motorsports would win the race, the 59th NASCAR Gander RV & Outdoors Truck Series of his career and the 3rd of the season. To fill the podium, Christian Eckes of Kyle Busch Motorsports and Matt Crafton of ThorSport Racing finished 2nd and 3rd, respectively.

== Background ==
The layout of Texas Motor Speedway, the venue where the race as held.

Texas Motor Speedway is a speedway located in Fort Worth, Texas. The track measures 1.5 miles (2.4 km) around and is banked 24 degrees in the turns, and is of the oval design, where the front straightaway juts outward slightly. The track layout is similar to Charlotte Motor Speedway. The track is owned by Speedway Motorsports, Inc., the same company that owns Atlanta and Charlotte Motor Speedway, as well as the short-track Bristol Motor Speedway.

=== Entry list ===
#	Driver	Team	Make
00	Angela Ruch	Reaume Brothers Racing	Toyota
2	Sheldon Creed	GMS Racing	Chevrolet
02	Tate Fogleman	Young's Motorsports	Chevrolet
3	Jordan Anderson	Jordan Anderson Racing	Chevrolet
4	Raphaël Lessard	Kyle Busch Motorsports	Toyota
04	Cory Roper	Roper Racing	Ford
6	Norm Benning	Norm Benning Racing	Chevrolet
9	Codie Rohrbaugh	CR7 Motorsports	Chevrolet
10	Jennifer Jo Cobb	Jennifer Jo Cobb Racing	Chevrolet
11	Spencer Davis	Spencer Davis Motorsports	Toyota
13	Johnny Sauter	ThorSport Racing	Ford
15	Tanner Gray	DGR-Crosley	Ford
16	Austin Hill	Hattori Racing Enterprises	Toyota
18	Christian Eckes	Kyle Busch Motorsports	Toyota
19	Derek Kraus	McAnally–Hilgemann Racing	Toyota
20	Spencer Boyd	Young's Motorsports	Chevrolet
21	Zane Smith	GMS Racing	Chevrolet
22	Austin Wayne Self	AM Racing	Chevrolet
23	Brett Moffitt	GMS Racing	Chevrolet
24	Justin Haley	GMS Racing	Chevrolet
26	Tyler Ankrum	GMS Racing	Chevrolet
30	Brennan Poole	On Point Motorsports	Toyota
33	Akinori Ogata	Reaume Brothers Racing	Toyota
38	Todd Gilliland	Front Row Motorsports	Ford
40	Ryan Truex	Niece Motorsports	Chevrolet
42	Ross Chastain	Niece Motorsports	Chevrolet
44	Natalie Decker	Niece Motorsports	Chevrolet
45	Ty Majeski	Niece Motorsports	Chevrolet
49	Tim Viens	CMI Motorsports	Chevrolet
51	Kyle Busch	Kyle Busch Motorsports	Toyota
52	Stewart Friesen	Halmar Friesen Racing	Toyota
56	Timmy Hill	Hill Motorsports	Chevrolet
68	Clay Greenfield	Clay Greenfield Motorsports	Toyota
88	Matt Crafton	ThorSport Racing	Ford
98	Grant Enfinger	ThorSport Racing	Ford
99	Ben Rhodes	ThorSport Racing	Ford
Official entry list

== Starting lineup ==
A random draw was made to determine the pole for the race. Sheldon Creed of GMS Racing would draw the pole for the race.

Pos.	#	Driver	Team	Make
1	2	Sheldon Creed	GMS Racing	Chevrolet
2	98	Grant Enfinger	ThorSport Racing	Ford
3	16	Austin Hill	Hattori Racing Enterprises	Toyota
4	51	Kyle Busch	Kyle Busch Motorsports	Toyota
5	38	Todd Gilliland	Front Row Motorsports	Ford
6	21	Zane Smith	GMS Racing	Chevrolet
7	18	Christian Eckes	Kyle Busch Motorsports	Toyota
8	23	Brett Moffitt	GMS Racing	Chevrolet
9	26	Tyler Ankrum	GMS Racing	Chevrolet
10	99	Ben Rhodes	ThorSport Racing	Ford
11	45	Ty Majeski	Niece Motorsports	Chevrolet
12	44	Natalie Decker	Niece Motorsports	Chevrolet
13	24	Justin Haley	GMS Racing	Chevrolet
14	40	Ryan Truex	Niece Motorsports	Chevrolet
15	88	Matt Crafton	ThorSport Racing	Ford
16	4	Raphaël Lessard	Kyle Busch Motorsports	Toyota
17	19	Derek Kraus	McAnally–Hilgemann Racing	Toyota
18	52	Stewart Friesen	Halmar Friesen Racing	Toyota
19	11	Spencer Davis	Spencer Davis Motorsports	Toyota
20	15	Tanner Gray	DGR-Crosley	Ford
21	13	Johnny Sauter	ThorSport Racing	Ford
22	56	Timmy Hill	Hill Motorsports	Chevrolet
23	00	Angela Ruch	Reaume Brothers Racing	Toyota
24	42	Ross Chastain	Niece Motorsports	Chevrolet
25	33	Akinori Ogata	Reaume Brothers Racing	Toyota
26	22	Austin Wayne Self	AM Racing	Chevrolet
27	20	Spencer Boyd	Young's Motorsports	Chevrolet
28	3	Jordan Anderson	Jordan Anderson Racing	Chevrolet
29	30	Brennan Poole	On Point Motorsports	Toyota
30	04	Cory Roper	Roper Racing	Ford
31	02	Tate Fogleman	Young's Motorsports	Chevrolet
32	9	Codie Rohrbaugh	CR7 Motorsports	Chevrolet
33	68	Clay Greenfield	Clay Greenfield Motorsports	Toyota
34	49	Tim Viens	CMI Motorsports	Chevrolet
35	10	Jennifer Jo Cobb	Jennifer Jo Cobb Racing	Chevrolet
36	6	Norm Benning	Norm Benning Racing	Chevrolet
Official starting lineup

== Race results ==
Stage 1 Laps: 40

Fin	#	Driver	Team	Make	Pts
1	51	Kyle Busch	Kyle Busch Motorsports	Toyota	0
2	21	Zane Smith	GMS Racing	Chevrolet	9
3	26	Tyler Ankrum	GMS Racing	Chevrolet	8
4	99	Ben Rhodes	ThorSport Racing	Ford	7
5	23	Brett Moffitt	GMS Racing	Chevrolet	6
6	18	Christian Eckes	Kyle Busch Motorsports	Toyota	5
7	38	Todd Gilliland	Front Row Motorsports	Ford	4
8	88	Matt Crafton	ThorSport Racing	Ford	3
9	24	Justin Haley	GMS Racing	Chevrolet	0
10	98	Grant Enfinger	ThorSport Racing	Ford	1

Stage 2 Laps: 40

Fin	#	Driver	Team	Make	Pts
1	23	Brett Moffitt	GMS Racing	Chevrolet	10
2	88	Matt Crafton	ThorSport Racing	Ford	9
3	26	Tyler Ankrum	GMS Racing	Chevrolet	8
4	99	Ben Rhodes	ThorSport Racing	Ford	7
5	21	Zane Smith	GMS Racing	Chevrolet	6
6	18	Christian Eckes	Kyle Busch Motorsports	Toyota	5
7	19	Derek Kraus	McAnally–Hilgemann Racing	Toyota	4
8	40	Ryan Truex	Niece Motorsports	Chevrolet	3
9	42	Ross Chastain	Niece Motorsports	Chevrolet	0
10	98	Grant Enfinger	ThorSport Racing	Ford	1

Stage 3 Laps: 87

Fin	St	#	Driver	Team	Make	Laps	Led	Status	Pts
1	4	51	Kyle Busch	Kyle Busch Motorsports	Toyota	167	72	running	0
2	7	18	Christian Eckes	Kyle Busch Motorsports	Toyota	167	52	running	45
3	15	88	Matt Crafton	ThorSport Racing	Ford	167	2	running	46
4	18	52	Stewart Friesen	Halmar Friesen Racing	Toyota	167	0	running	33
5	8	23	Brett Moffitt	GMS Racing	Chevrolet	167	7	running	48
6	9	26	Tyler Ankrum	GMS Racing	Chevrolet	167	0	running	47
7	13	24	Justin Haley	GMS Racing	Chevrolet	167	0	running	0
8	2	98	Grant Enfinger	ThorSport Racing	Ford	167	0	running	31
9	10	99	Ben Rhodes	ThorSport Racing	Ford	167	1	running	42
10	24	42	Ross Chastain	Niece Motorsports	Chevrolet	166	0	running	0
11	17	19	Derek Kraus	McAnally–Hilgemann Racing	Toyota	166	0	running	30
12	16	4	Raphaël Lessard	Kyle Busch Motorsports	Toyota	166	0	running	25
13	14	40	Ryan Truex	Niece Motorsports	Chevrolet	166	0	running	27
14	26	22	Austin Wayne Self	AM Racing	Chevrolet	165	0	running	23
15	11	45	Ty Majeski	Niece Motorsports	Chevrolet	165	0	running	22
16	1	2	Sheldon Creed	GMS Racing	Chevrolet	164	7	running	21
17	30	04	Cory Roper	Roper Racing	Ford	164	0	running	20
18	22	56	Timmy Hill	Hill Motorsports	Chevrolet	164	0	running	19
19	6	21	Zane Smith	GMS Racing	Chevrolet	164	26	running	33
20	33	68	Clay Greenfield	Clay Greenfield Motorsports	Toyota	163	0	running	17
21	19	11	Spencer Davis	Spencer Davis Motorsports	Toyota	162	0	running	16
22	32	9	Codie Rohrbaugh	CR7 Motorsports	Chevrolet	161	0	running	15
23	23	00	Angela Ruch	Reaume Brothers Racing	Toyota	160	0	running	14
24	27	20	Spencer Boyd	Young's Motorsports	Chevrolet	156	0	running	13
25	25	33	Akinori Ogata	Reaume Brothers Racing	Toyota	155	0	running	12
26	34	49	Tim Viens	CMI Motorsports	Chevrolet	154	0	running	11
27	5	38	Todd Gilliland	Front Row Motorsports	Ford	152	0	crash	14
28	28	3	Jordan Anderson	Jordan Anderson Racing	Chevrolet	152	0	running	9
29	35	10	Jennifer Jo Cobb	Jennifer Jo Cobb Racing	Chevrolet	121	0	electrical	8
30	3	16	Austin Hill	Hattori Racing Enterprises	Toyota	107	0	engine	7
31	29	30	Brennan Poole	On Point Motorsports	Toyota	91	0	crash	0
32	31	02	Tate Fogleman	Young's Motorsports	Chevrolet	79	0	crash	5
33	21	13	Johnny Sauter	ThorSport Racing	Ford	62	0	engine	5
34	36	6	Norm Benning	Norm Benning Racing	Chevrolet	46	0	handling	5
35	12	44	Natalie Decker	Niece Motorsports	Chevrolet	45	0	engine	5
36	20	15	Tanner Gray	DGR-Crosley	Ford	43	0	transmission	5
Official race results

Previous race: 2020 Buckle Up in Your Truck 225	NASCAR Gander RV & Outdoors Truck Series; 2020 season	Next race: 2020 Blue-Emu Maximum Pain Relief 200
