= Spencer Davis (racing driver) =

American racing driver (born 1998)

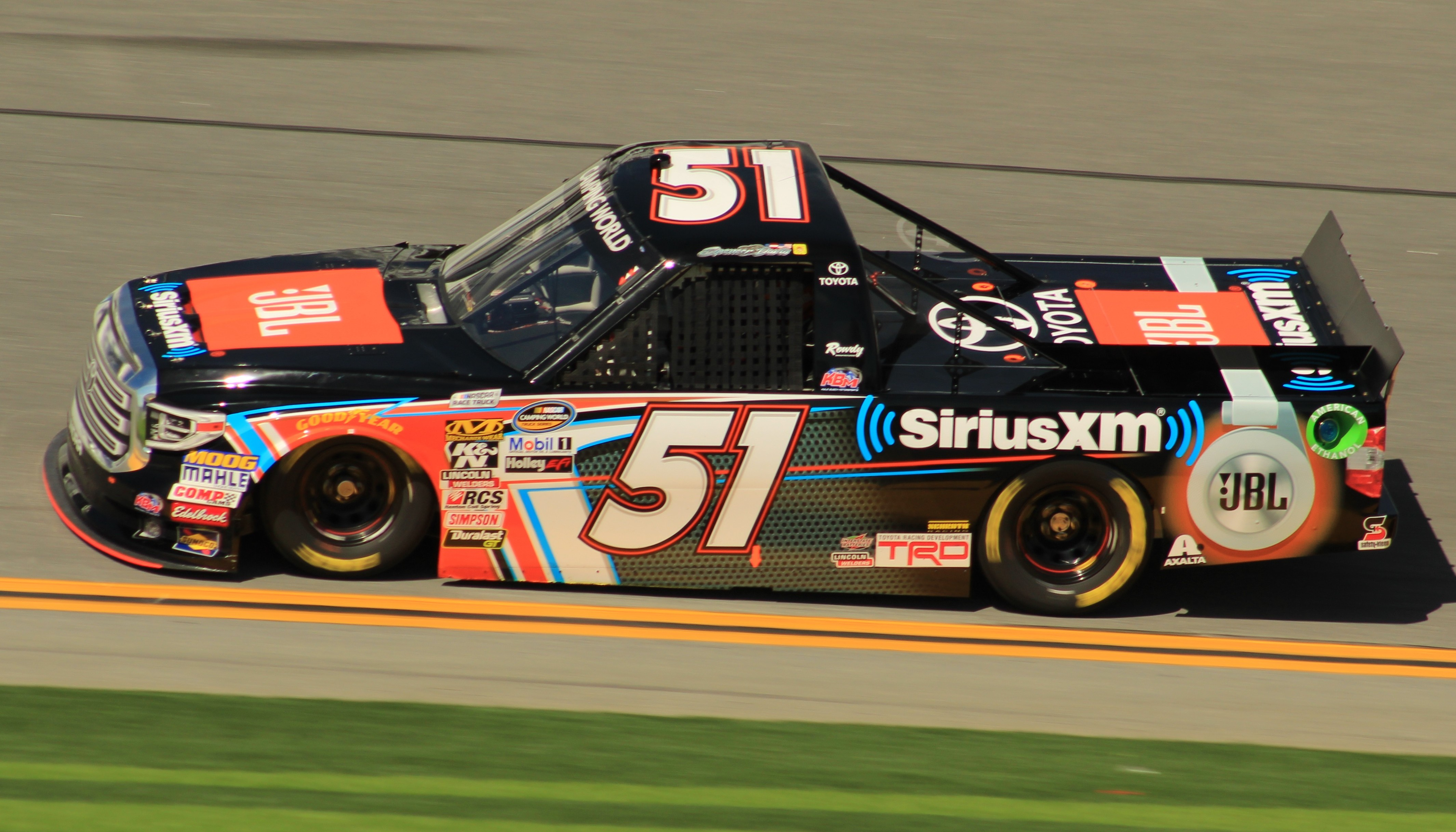
- Davis racing at Daytona in 2018
- Born: Spencer Scott Davis; November 29, 1998 (age 27); Dawsonville, Georgia, U.S.
- Achievements: 2014 World Series of Asphalt Pro Late Model Champion; 2015 Red Eye PLM Winner (Inaugural race)
- Awards: 2013 PASS National Championship Super Late Model Series Rookie of the Year; NASCAR Next Class of 2017

NASCAR FedEx Freight Truck Series career
- 36 races run over 6 years
- 2026 position: 64th
- Best finish: 24th (2020)
- First race: 2018 NextEra Energy Resources 250 (Daytona)
- Last race: 2026 Craftsman 200 (Homestead)
Wins	Top tens	Poles
0	3	0

ARCA Menards Series career
- 7 races run over 1 year
- Best finish: 20th (2017)
- First race: 2017 General Tire 200 (Talladega)
- Last race: 2017 Kansas ARCA 150 (Kansas)
Wins	Top tens	Poles
0	4	0

ARCA Menards Series West career
- 3 races run over 3 years
- Best finish: 52nd (2024)
- First race: 2015 Casino Arizona 100 (Phoenix)
- Last race: 2025 West Coast Stock Car Motorsports Hall of Fame 150 (Kern County)
Wins	Top tens	Poles
0	0	0
- Statistics up to date as of November 6, 2026.

Spencer Scott Davis (born November 29, 1998) is an American professional stock car racing driver and team owner. He last competed part-time in the NASCAR Craftsman Truck Series, driving the No. 5 Toyota Tundra TRD Pro for Tricon Garage, He has previously competed in the ARCA Racing Series and the NASCAR Whelen Modified Tour.

== Racing career ==
=== Early years ===
Davis began to race in the go-kart ranks when he was six years old. From there, he progressed into late model cars and trucks. He won many championships around the Southeast United States. In 2014, aged 15, Davis ran the full NASCAR Whelen Southern Modified Tour schedule with backing from Coors Light. He ran a partial schedule in both the Southern Modified Tour and the main NASCAR Whelen Modified Tour in 2015 while also driving a partial NASCAR K&N Pro Series West schedule.

=== Developmental series ===
After finding limited success in modifieds, Davis transitioned to the NASCAR K&N Pro Series East in 2015, driving for NTS Motorsports. After a restricted schedule that year, he found a ride with Ranier Racing with MDM for the 2016 season. Davis found victory lane for the first time at Dominion Raceway in May of that year. The deal with Ranier eventually collapsed, and Davis spent the remainder of the year driving for his family team, Jefferson Pitts Racing and Hattori Racing Enterprises. He was also named to the 2016–2017 NASCAR Next class.

On February 11, 2017, Davis signed with Venturini Motorsports to run seven ARCA Racing Series events in 2017 after testing with the team at Daytona International Speedway. His first race was at Talladega Superspeedway. After scoring a top-five in his first race, Davis found the top ten in three of his other six starts. He also ran premier late model events.

Balancing a NASCAR Camping World Truck Series schedule in 2018, Davis wound up running a partial schedule in the K&N East for Danny Watts Racing, which operated in conjunction with Rette Jones Racing. Expanding on that, Davis and RJR announced a full K&N East slate for 2019. At World Wide Technology Raceway in August, Davis earned his first win with RJR and first in three-plus years, passing Sam Mayer on a late green–white–checkered finish restart.

=== NASCAR ===
On January 23, 2018, it was announced that Davis would compete for Kyle Busch Motorsports, splitting time between the team's Nos. 4 and 51 entries. as part of the announcement, he was named as the driver of the No. 51 in four races and the No. 4 for a race, including the first three races of the season between the Nos. 51 and the 4. In his first race at Daytona International Speedway, Davis posted a seventh-place finish.

In 2019, Davis ran a limited slate with K&N team Rette Jones Racing but also joined Niece Motorsports for the summer race at Chicagoland Speedway in the Truck Series.

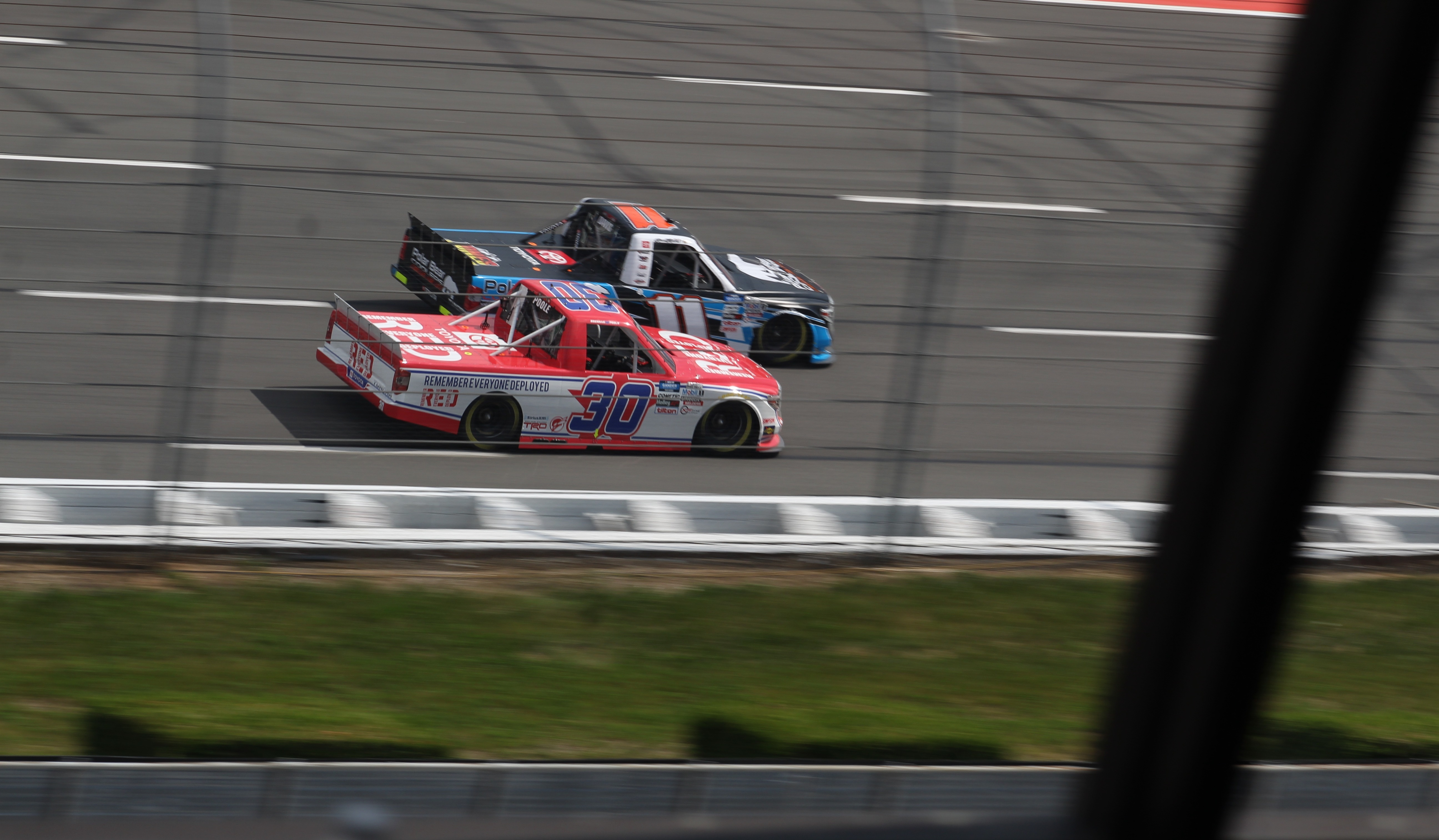
Davis in his No. 11 racing the No. 30 of Brennan Poole at Pocono in 2020

For 2020, Davis started his own team, Spencer Davis Motorsports. The team competed in most of the races during the first half of the 2020 NASCAR Gander RV & Outdoors Truck Series season, fielding the No. 11 Toyota with Davis behind the wheel. On August 6, Davis revealed that he had tested positive for COVID-19 and would miss the Henry Ford Health System 200, scheduled for the following day.

In January 2021, Spencer Davis Motorsports announced Davis would run the full Truck season in the No. 11. On March 20, it was announced that Davis acquired the owner's points of NEMCO Motorsports. After failing to qualify at Daytona, they were not entered into the Daytona RC. The team still wants to run a majority of the schedule, in which they did with Bubba Wallace at Bristol Dirt, Camden Murphy for COTA and Clay Greenfield for two races.

=== Spotting ===
During 2019, Davis dipped his toe into spotting, helping Niece Motorsports driver Kyle Benjamin in the Gander Outdoors Truck Series.

== Personal life ==
Davis was homeschooled in order to maintain a flexible racing schedule. Spencer Davis grew up in Dawsonville, Georgia, the son of Scott Davis and Cynthia Davis. His father, Scott Davis, runs a poultry equipment business in Dahlonega.

== Motorsports career results ==
=== Stock car career summary ===
Season	Series	Team	Races	Wins	Top 5	Top 10	Points	Position
2014	NASCAR Whelen Southern Modified Tour	David Hill	14	0	2	7	475	9th
2014	NASCAR Whelen Modified Tour	David Hill	4	0	0	2	105	26th
2015	CARS Super Late Model Tour	Greg Marlowe	1	0	0	0	9	65th
2015	CARS Late Model Stock Car Tour	Greg Marlowe	2	0	0	0	39	31st
2015	NASCAR Whelen Modified Tour	David Hill	4	0	0	0	120	19th
2015	NASCAR Whelen Modified Tour	Susan Hill	5	0	0	1	114	35th
2015	NASCAR K&N Pro Series West	NTS Motorsports	1	0	0	0	17	70th
2015	NASCAR K&N Pro Series East	NTS Motorsports	4	0	3	4	159	24th
2016	CARS Super Late Model Tour	Greg Marlowe	2	0	0	2	49	31st
2016	NASCAR K&N Pro Series East	MDM Motorsports	7	1	5	5	440	8th
2016	NASCAR K&N Pro Series East	Davis Racing	2	0	0	0	440	8th
2016	NASCAR K&N Pro Series East	Jefferson Pitts Racing	1	0	0	1	440	8th
2016	NASCAR K&N Pro Series East	Hattori Racing Enterprises	3	0	0	1	440	8th
2017	CARS Super Mate Model Tour	Spencer Davis	2	0	1	1	46	27th
2017	NASCAR Whelen Modified Tour	Danny Watts Racing	2	0	0	0	48	51st
2017	NASCAR K&N Pro Series East	Ben Kennedy Racing	2	0	1	2	104	21st
2017	NASCAR K&N Pro Series East	Martin-McClure Racing	1	0	0	0	104	21st
2017	ARCA Racing Series	Venturini Motorsports	7	0	1	4	1280	20th
2018	NASCAR Whelen Modified Tour	Danny Watts Racing	1	0	0	0	125	33rd
2018	NASCAR K&N Pro Series East	Danny Watts Racing	12	0	5	9	426	9th
2018	NASCAR Camping World Truck Series	Kyle Busch Motorsports	5	0	0	2	141	30th
2019	NASCAR K&N Pro Series East	Rette Jones Racing	12	1	6	11	458	4th
2019	NASCAR Gander Outdoors Truck Series	Rette Jones Racing	3	0	0	1	81	38th
2019	NASCAR Gander Outdoors Truck Series	Niece Motorsports	1	0	0	0	81	38th
2020	NASCAR Gander RV & Outdoors Truck Series	Spencer Davis Motorsports	14	0	0	0	225	24th
2021	NASCAR Camping World Truck Series	Spencer Davis Motorsports	8	0	0	0	111	33rd
2022	SMART Modified Tour	Spencer Davis Motorsports	3	0	1	2	9	52nd
2022	NASCAR Whelen Modified Tour	Spencer Davis Motorsports	5	0	0	1	125	33rd
2023	SMART Modified Tour	Spencer Davis Motorsports	2	0	0	2	65	35th
2023	NASCAR Whelen Modified Tour	Spencer Davis Motorsports	1	0	0	0	31	70th
2023	NASCAR Craftsman Truck Series	Roper Racing	3	0	0	0	26	51st
2024	CARS Pro Late Model Tour	Spencer Davis Motorsports	13	2	9	11	376	**2nd**
2024	NASCAR Whelen Modified Tour	Cook Racing Technologies	1	0	0	0	20	65th
2024	ARCA Menards Series West	Cook Racing Technologies	1	0	0	0	33	52nd
2025	ASA STARS National Tour	Nexus Racing	4	0	0	2	163	24th
2025	CARS Pro Late Model Tour	Ben Kennedy Racing	2	1	2	2	86	23rd
2025	ARCA Menards Series West	Cook Racing Technologies	1	0	0	0	32	57th
2025	ARCA Menards Series East	Spraker Racing Enterprises	0	0	0	0	0	N/A
2026	ASA STARS National Tour	Nexus Racing	4	0	2	4		
2026	NASCAR Craftsman Truck Series	Tricon Garage	2	0	0	0	24	64th

^{†} As Davis was a guest driver, he was ineligible for championship points.

=== NASCAR ===
(key) (Bold – Pole position awarded by qualifying time. Italics – Pole position earned by points standings or practice time. * – Most laps led.)

==== Craftsman Truck Series ====
NASCAR Craftsman Truck Series results
Year	Team	No.	Make	1	2	3	4	5	6	7	8	9	10	11	12	13	14	15	16	17	18	19	20	21	22	23	24	25	NCTC	Pts	Ref
2018	Kyle Busch Motorsports	51	Toyota	DAY; 7	ATL; 13						TEX; 9	IOW	GTW	CHI	KEN	ELD	POC	MCH; 22	BRI	MSP	LVS	TAL	MAR	TEX	PHO	HOM			30th	141	
2018	Kyle Busch Motorsports	4	Toyota			LVS; 13	MAR	DOV	KAN	CLT																			30th	141	
2019	Rette Jones Racing	82	Ford	DAY; DNQ	ATL	LVS																							38th	81	
2019	Rette Jones Racing	11	Ford				MAR; 20	TEX	DOV	KAN	CLT	TEX	IOW	GTW															38th	81	
2019	Niece Motorsports	44	Chevy												CHI; 27														38th	81	
2019	Rette Jones Racing	11	Toyota													KEN; 8	POC	ELD	MCH	BRI	MSP	LVS; 18	TAL	MAR	PHO	HOM; DNQ			38th	81	
2020	Spencer Davis Motorsports	11	Toyota	DAY	LVS; 12	CLT; 40	ATL; 25	HOM; 13	POC; 18	KEN; 14	TEX; 21	KAN; 29	KAN; 14	MCH	DAY; 34	DOV; 16	GTW; Wth	DAR	RCH	BRI	LVS; 19	TAL	KAN	TEX	MAR; 33	PHO; 23			24th	225	
2021	Spencer Davis Motorsports	11	Toyota	DAY; DNQ	DAY	LVS	ATL; 20	BRI	RCH; 16	KAN; 29	DAR; 29	COA	CLT	TEX	NSH; 25	POC	KNX	GLN	GTW; Wth	DAR; 22	BRI	LVS; 15	TAL	MAR; 29	PHO				33rd	111	
2023	Roper Racing	04	Ford	DAY	LVS	ATL	COA	TEX	BRI	MAR	KAN	DAR	NWS	CLT	GTW	NSH	MOH	POC	RCH	IRP	MLW	KAN; 36	BRI	TAL	HOM; 32				51st	26	
2023	Roper Racing	04	Chevy																							PHO; 17			51st	26	
2026	Tricon Garage	5	Toyota	DAY	ATL	STP	DAR	CAR	BRI	TEX	GLN	DOV	CLT	NSH	MCH; 24	COR	LRP	NWS	IRP	RCH	NHA	BRI	KAN	CLT	PHO	TAL	MAR	HOM; 26	64th	24	

==== Whelen Modified Tour ====
NASCAR Whelen Modified Tour results
Year	Car owner	No.	Make	1	2	3	4	5	6	7	8	9	10	11	12	13	14	15	16	17	18	NWMTC	Pts	Ref
2014	David Hill	79	Pontiac	TMP	STA	STA	WAT; 26	RIV	NHA; 28	MON	STA	TMP; 10	BRI	NHA	STA	TMP; 7						26th	105	
2015	Susan Hill	79	Pontiac	TMP; 12	STA; 30	WAT; 9	STA; 31	TMP; 24	RIV	NHA	MON	STA	TMP	BRI	RIV	NHA	STA	TMP				35th	114	
2017	Danny Watts Racing	82	Chevy	MYR	TMP	STA	LGY; 23	TMP	RIV	NHA	STA	TMP	BRI	SEE	OSW	RIV	NHA	STA				51st	48	
2017	Danny Watts Racing	88	Chevy																TMP; 17			51st	48	
2018	Danny Watts Racing	82	Chevy	MYR	TMP	STA	SEE	TMP	LGY; 20	RIV	NHA	STA	TMP	BRI	OSW	RIV	NHA	STA	TMP			57th	24	
2022	Spencer Davis Motorsports	29	Ford	NSM; 16	RCH; 26	RIV	LEE	JEN; 22	MND	RIV	WAL	NHA	CLM	TMP; 10	LGY	OSW	RIV	TMP	MAR; 21			33rd	125	
2023	Spencer Davis Motorsports	29	Ford	NSM; 13	RCH	MON	RIV	LEE	SEE	RIV	WAL	NHA	LMP	THO	LGY	OSW	MON	RIV	NWS	THO	MAR	70th	31	
2024	Cook Racing Technologies	42	Chevy	NSM; 24	RCH	THO	MON	RIV	SEE	NHA	MON	LMP	THO	OSW	RIV	MON	THO	NWS	MAR			65th	20	

==== Whelen Southern Modified Tour ====
NASCAR Whelen Southern Modified Tour results
Year	Car owner	No.	Make	1	2	3	4	5	6	7	8	9	10	11	12	13	14	NWSMTC	Pts	Ref
2014	David Hill	79	Pontiac	CRW; 11	SNM; 9	SBO; 13	LGY; 11	CRW; 9	BGS; 5	BRI; 5	LGY; 14	CRW; 15	SBO; 7	SNM; 10	CRW; 13	CRW; 6	CLT; 14	9th	475	
2015	David Hill	79	Pontiac	CRW; 18	CRW; 12	SBO; 12	LGY; 14	CRW	BGS	BRI	LGY	SBO	CLT					19th	120	

^{*} Season still in progress
^{1} Ineligible for series points

=== ARCA Racing Series ===
ARCA Racing Series results
Year	Team	No.	Make	1	2	3	4	5	6	7	8	9	10	11	12	13	14	15	16	17	18	19	20	ARSC	Pts	Ref
2017	Venturini Motorsports	15	Toyota	DAY	NSH	SLM	TAL; 3	TOL	ELK	POC; 11														20th	1280	
2017	Venturini Motorsports	25	Toyota								MCH; 9	MAD	IOW; 7	IRP; 14	POC	WIN	ISF	ROA	DSF	SLM	CHI	KEN; 15		20th	1280	
2017	Venturini Motorsports	55	Toyota																				KAN; 7	20th	1280	

==== ARCA Menards Series East ====
ARCA Menards Series East results
Year	Team	No.	Make	1	2	3	4	5	6	7	8	9	10	11	12	13	14	AMSEC	Pts	Ref
2015	NTS Motorsports	20	Chevy	NSM	GRE	BRI	IOW	BGS	LGY	COL	NHA; 6	IOW; 2	GLN	MOT	VIR	RCH; 5	DOV; 4	24th	159	
2016	Ranier Racing with MDM	41	Chevy	NSM; 2	**MOB**; 2	GRE; 4	BRI; 14	VIR; 23	DOM; 1	STA; 3								8th	440	
2016	Davis Racing	92	Toyota								COL; 17	NHA; 16						8th	440	
2016	Jefferson Pitts Racing	55	Ford										IOW; 9	GLN				8th	440	
2016	Hattori Racing Enterprises	1	Toyota												GRE; 10	NJM; 12	DOV; 25	8th	440	
2017	Ben Kennedy Racing	96	Toyota	NSM; 10	GRE	BRI; 3	SBO	SBO	MEM	BLN	TMP							21st	104	
2017	Martin-McClure Racing	13	Toyota									NHA; 15	IOW	GLN	LGY	NJM	DOV	21st	104	
2018	Danny Watts Racing	82	Chevy	NSM; 6	BRI; 7	LGY	SBO; 8	SBO; 5	MEM; 19	NJE		NHA; 7	IOW; 4		GTW; 24	NHA; 3		9th	426	
2018	Danny Watts Racing	13	Chevy								**TMP**; 4							9th	426	
2018	Danny Watts Racing	82	Ford											GLN; 4			DOV; 15	9th	426	
2019	Rette Jones Racing	82	Ford	NSM; 7														4th	458	
2019	Rette Jones Racing	30	Ford		BRI; 5	SBO; 4	SBO; 5	MEM; 14	NHA; 7	IOW; 9	GLN; 8	BRI; 5*	GTW; 1	NHA; 4	DOV; 7			4th	458	
2025	Spraker Racing Enterprises	63	Chevy	FIF	CAR; Wth	NSV	FRS	DOV	IRP	IOW	BRI							N/A	0	

==== ARCA Menards Series West ====
ARCA Menards Series West results
Year	Team	No.	Make	1	2	3	4	5	6	7	8	9	10	11	12	13	AMSWC	Pts	Ref
2015	NTS Motorsports	20	Chevy	KCR	IRW	TUS	IOW	SHA	SON	SLS	IOW	EVG	CNS	MER	AAS	PHO; 27	70th	17	
2024	Cook Racing Technologies	42	Chevy	PHO	KER	PIR	SON	IRW	IRW	SHA	TRI	MAD	AAS	KER; 11	PHO		52nd	33	
2025	Cook Racing Technologies	42	Chevy	KER; 12	PHO	TUC	CNS	KER	SON	TRI	PIR	AAS	MAD	LVS	PHO		57th	32	

=== CARS Late Model Stock Car Tour ===
(key) (Bold – Pole position awarded by qualifying time. Italics – Pole position earned by points standings or practice time. * – Most laps led. ** – All laps led.)

CARS Late Model Stock Car Tour results
Year	Team	No.	Make	1	2	3	4	5	6	7	8	9	10	CLMSCTC	Pts	Ref
2015	Greg Marlowe	07	Chevy	SNM	ROU	HCY	SNM	TCM	MMS	ROU	CON	MYB; 14	HCY; 13	31st	39	

=== CARS Super Late Model Tour ===
(key)

CARS Super Late Model Tour results
Year	Team	No.	Make	1	2	3	4	5	6	7	8	9	10	11	12	13	CSLMTC	Pts	Ref
2015	Greg Marlowe	29	N/A	SNM	ROU	HCY	SNM	TCM	MMS	ROU	CON	MYB	HCY; 24				65th	9	
2016	Greg Marlowe	29	N/A	SNM	ROU	HCY	TCM	GRE	ROU; 10	CON	MYB	HCY; 7	SNM				31st	49	
2017	Spencer Davis	29	Toyota	CON; 16	DOM	DOM	HCY	HCY	BRI	AND	ROU	TCM					27th	46	
2017	Spencer Davis	55	Toyota										ROU; 4	HCY	CON	SBO	27th	46	

=== CARS Pro Late Model Tour ===
(key)

CARS Pro Late Model Tour results
Year	Team	No.	Make	1	2	3	4	5	6	7	8	9	10	11	12	13	CPLMTC	Pts	Ref
2024	Spencer Davis Motorsports	29	Chevy	SNM; 6	HCY; 2	OCS; 3	ACE; 2	TCM; 3	CRW; 6		NWS; 3				TCM; 4	NWS; 14	2nd	376	
2024	Spencer Davis Motorsports	29D	Chevy							HCY; 12		ACE; 4	FLC; 1	SBO; 1			2nd	376	
2025	Ben Kennedy Racing	96	Chevy	AAS	CDL	OCS	ACE	NWS; 4	CRW	HCY	**HCY**; 1*	AND	FLC	SBO	TCM	NWS	23rd	86	

=== ASA STARS National Tour ===
(key) (Bold – Pole position awarded by qualifying time. Italics – Pole position earned by points standings or practice time. * – Most laps led. ** – All laps led.)

ASA STARS National Tour results
Year	Team	No.	Make	1	2	3	4	5	6	7	8	9	10	11	12	ASNTC	Pts	Ref
2025	Nexus Racing	96D	Chevy	NSM; 10	FIF; 24	DOM	HCY; 7	NPS	MAD	SLG	AND	OWO	TOL	WIN	NSV; 19	24th	163	
2026	Nexus Racing	96D	Chevy	NSM; 4	FIF; 10	HCY; 8	SLG	MAD	NPS	OWO	TRI	WIN	NSV	NSM; 3		-*	-*	

=== SMART Modified Tour ===
SMART Modified Tour results
Year	Car owner	No.	Make	1	2	3	4	5	6	7	8	9	10	11	12	13	SMTC	Pts	Ref
2022	Spencer Davis Motorsports	29	N/A	FLO	SNM	CRW	SBO	FCS	CRW; 23	NWS; 2*	NWS; 6	CAR	DOM	HCY	TRI	PUL	52nd	9	
2023	Spencer Davis Motorsports	29	N/A	FLO	CRW	SBO	**HCY**; 10	FCS	CRW	ACE; 7	CAR	PUL	TRI	SBO	ROU		35th	65	
