= Spencer Davis Motorsports =

American stock car racing team

- Owner: Spencer Davis
- Base: Dawsonville, Georgia
- Series: NASCAR Camping World Truck Series; NASCAR Whelen Modified Tour
- Race drivers: Truck Series: 11. Spencer Davis (part-time); Whelen Modified Tour: 29. Spencer Davis (part-time)
- Manufacturer: Toyota
- Opened: 2019

Career
- Debut: Truck Series: 2020 Strat 200 (Las Vegas)
- Latest race: Truck Series: 2021 United Rentals 200 (Martinsville)
- Races competed: Total: 26; Truck Series: 26
- Drivers' Championships: Total: 0 Truck Series: 0
- Race victories: Total: 0 Truck Series: 0
- Pole positions: Total: 0 Truck Series: 0

Spencer Davis Motorsports was an American stock car racing team that competed in the NASCAR Camping World Truck Series and the NASCAR Whelen Modified Tour. They last fielded the No. 11 Toyota Tundra part-time for owner/driver Spencer Davis.

== History ==
In 2019, Spencer Davis announced that he will be forming his own team for the 2020 NASCAR Gander RV & Outdoors Truck Series season, called Spencer Davis Motorsports, under a full-time schedule. He ran part-time for Rette Jones Racing in 2019, before purchasing the assets of the 11 truck from Mark Rette.

== Camping World Truck Series ==
=== Truck No. 11 history ===
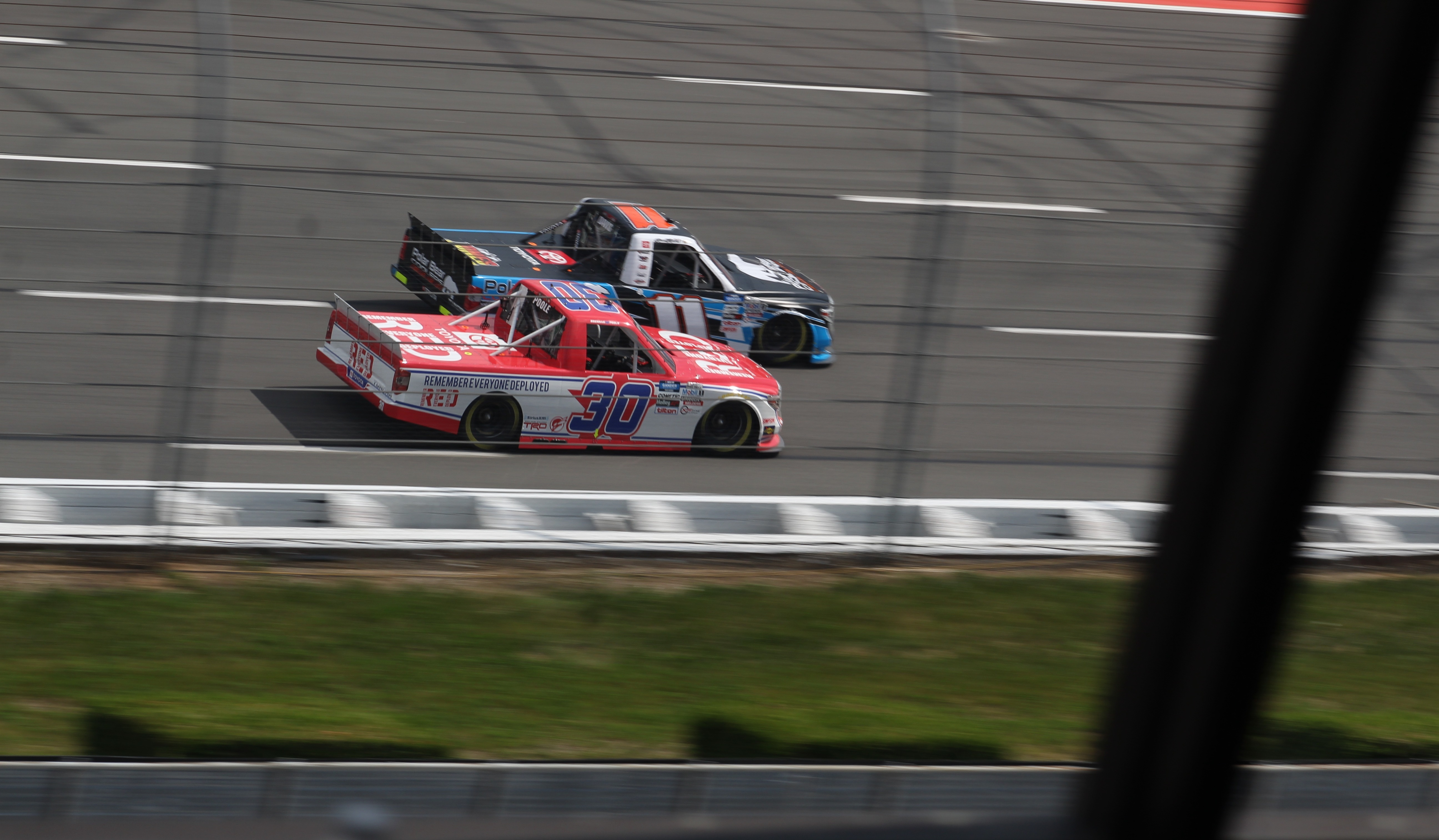
Brennan Poole (No. 30) with Spencer Davis (No. 11) at Pocono Raceway in 2020.

The team made their first start in the 2020 Strat 200 at Las Vegas Motor Speedway, after missing the first race of the season at Daytona. Davis piloted the truck, and would start 21st and finish 12th, getting the team's first top 15 in their first start. Davis would run for the next nine races, getting his best finishes of 13th at Homestead-Miami Speedway, and 14th at Kentucky Speedway and Kansas Speedway. On August 6, Davis announced that he had tested positive for COVID-19, and would miss the Henry Ford Health System 200 at Michigan International Speedway. He was cleared to return the following week. Due to unknown reasons, the team would run part-time for the remainder of season, with their last race being the season finale at Phoenix Raceway, where Davis started 27th and finished 23rd.

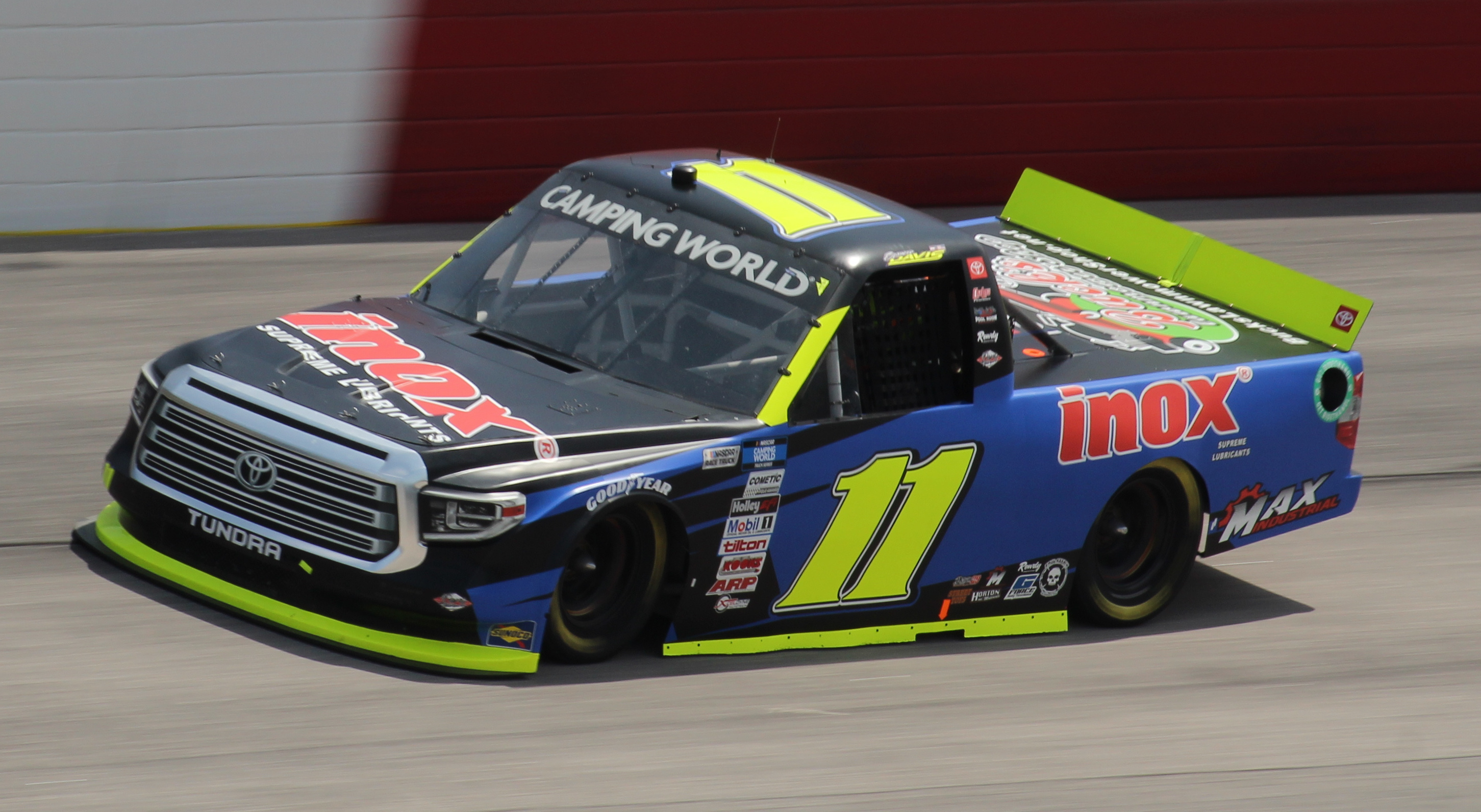
Davis' truck at Darlington Raceway in 2021.

On January 22, 2021, Davis announced that he will be attempting another full-time effort in the 2021 NASCAR Camping World Truck Series for his team. The team failed to qualify at Daytona due to owner points, and would miss the next two races after that. On March 21, Davis purchased the owner points from NEMCO Motorsports, and would allow them to run for the full season, starting at Atlanta Motor Speedway. On March 18, Davis announced that Bubba Wallace will pilot the 11 truck in the Pinty's Dirt Truck Race at Bristol Motor Speedway, with a collaboration from Hattori Racing Enterprises. Wallace started 32nd due to the qualifying races being cancelled from rain. He would finish in 11th, getting the team their best career finish in the truck series. On May 17, the team announced that Camden Murphy will drive the 11 truck at Circuit of the Americas, with a partnership from Chevrolet. Murphy started 24th and finished 19th. Clay Greenfield would drive the 11 truck for two races, which would be collaboration races with his team, Clay Greenfield Motorsports. The team is scheduled run 3-4 races in 2022.

==== Truck No. 11 Results ====
NASCAR Camping World Truck Series results
| Year | Driver | No. | Make | 1 | 2 | 3 | 4 | 5 | 6 | 7 | 8 | 9 | 10 | 11 | 12 | 13 | 14 | 15 | 16 | 17 | 18 | 19 | 20 | 21 | 22 | 23 | Owners | Pts | Ref |
|---|---|---|---|---|---|---|---|---|---|---|---|---|---|---|---|---|---|---|---|---|---|---|---|---|---|---|---|---|---|
| 2020 | Spencer Davis | 11 | Toyota | DAY | LVS; 12 | CLT; 40 | ATL; 25 | HOM; 13 | POC; 18 | KEN; 14 | TEX; 21 | KAN; 29 | KAN; 14 | MCH | DAY; 34 | DOV; 16 | GTW; Wth | DAR | RCH | BRI | LVS; 19 | TAL | KAN | TEX | MAR; 33 | PHO; 23 | 32nd | 225 | |
| 2021 | Spencer Davis | 11 | Toyota | DAY; DNQ | DAY | LVS | ATL; 20 | | RCH; 16 | KAN; 29 | DAR; 29 | | CLT | TEX | NSH; 25 | POC | KNX | GLN | GTW; Wth | DAR; 22 | | LVS; 15 | | MAR; 29 | PHO | | 36th | 208 | |
| 2021 | Bubba Wallace | 11 | Toyota | | | | | BRI; 11 | | | | | | | | | | | | | | | | | | | 36th | 208 | |
| 2021 | Camden Murphy | 11 | Chevy | | | | | | | | | COA; 19 | | | | | | | | | | | | | | | 36th | 208 | |
| 2021 | Clay Greenfield | 11 | Toyota | | | | | | | | | | | | | | | | | | BRI; 23 | | TAL; 23 | | | | 36th | 208 | |

== Whelen Modified Tour ==
=== Car No. 29 history ===
The team made their Whelen Modified Tour debut in 2022, under a part-time schedule. Davis drove the modified in the 2022 New Smyrna Visitors Bureau 200 at New Smyrna Speedway. Davis would start 20th and finish 16th.
