= Vince Welch =

American television and radio personality

Vincent Welch
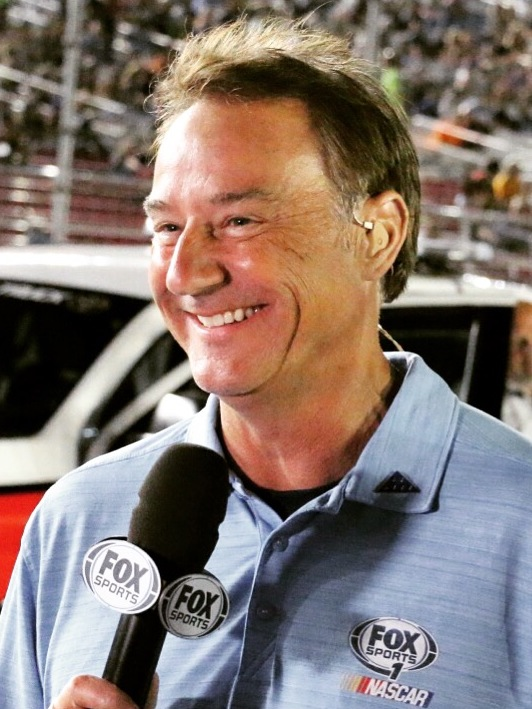
- Welch at Las Vegas Motor Speedway in 2015
- Born: August 4, 1964 (age 61); Indianapolis, Indiana, U.S.
- Occupation(s): TV sports announcer and pit reporter
- Years active: 1987–present
- Known for: Commentator on Fox Sports for NASCAR events and occasional pit reporter
- Children: 3

Vincent Welch (born August 4, 1964) is an American radio and television personality most recently for Fox Sports. Until 2022, Welch was the play-by-play commentator for NASCAR Camping World Truck Series, and occasionally, a pit reporter for FOX's coverage for the NASCAR Cup Series and NASCAR Xfinity Series. He also does commentary for games for Fox College Hoops.

== Career ==
After graduating from Ball State University in 1987, Welch would get an entry-level job in a small radio station in Richmond, Indiana, WKBV. With WKBV, he would do play-by-play commentary for the local high school teams in the area. After three and a half years with the company, he would leave for a part-time job with WISH-TV, and worked his way up into television.

In 1992, Welch would earn a regional Emmy Award for sports programming.

In 1995, he would move to WNDY-TV, and was named the sports chief of the station.

In 1998, Welch would move to WIBC, after he felt that he would be let go from WNDY-TV, as another company, Paramount Stations Group, had purchased the station and were letting go staff members. Welch was named sports director for WIBC, taking over for Bob Lamey.

Working for ESPN for various motor sports leagues, he would work as a pit reporter. In 2010, Welch was announced as the lead commentator for ESPN2's NASCAR Nationwide Series coverage.

On January 2, 2023, Welch announced he will not return to Fox Sports for the 2023 season. He currently is with NASCAR Productions as a spotter, primarily working for his son Dillon.

== Personal life ==
Vince graduated from Ball State University in 1987 with a degree in telecommunications. His son, Dillon Welch, was a radio personality for the Motor Racing Network. Dillon is currently a pit reporter for NBC. In 2020, it was announced that Welch had signed an endorsement deal with health and wellness multilevel marketing company Zurvita.
