= Roper Racing =

NASCAR team

- Owner(s): Cory Roper; Craig Roper; Cherie Roper
- Base: Mont Belvieu, Texas
- Series: NASCAR Craftsman Truck Series
- Manufacturer: Chevrolet
- Opened: 2018

Career
- Debut: 2018 Alpha Energy Solutions 250 (Martinsville)
- Latest race: 2024 NASCAR Craftsman Truck Series Championship Race (Phoenix)
- Races competed: 72
- Drivers' Championships: 0
- Race victories: 0
- Pole positions: 0

Roper Racing is an American professional stock car racing team that competes in the NASCAR Craftsman Truck Series, that last fielded the No. 04 Chevrolet Silverado part-time in 2024.

== History ==
=== Craftsman Truck Series ===
==== Truck No. 04 history ====
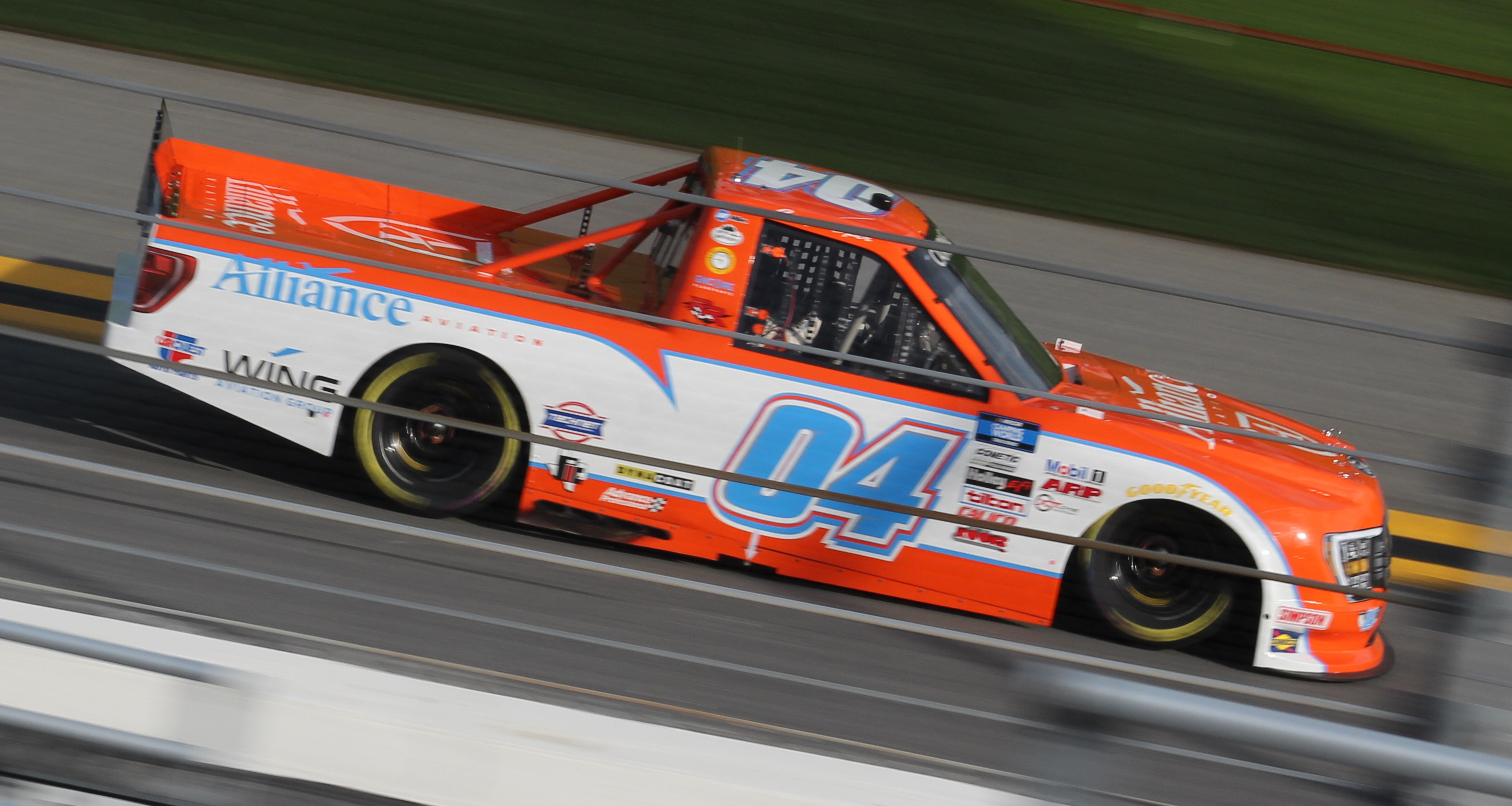
Cory Roper in the No. 04 at Daytona International Speedway in 2021

The team debuted in the spring Martinsville race in 2018 with team owner Cory Roper driving. Roper started 17th and finished 13th. Roper would then run more races, specifically at Iowa, Bristol, the second Las Vegas and Texas races, and the season finale at Homestead throughout the year, scoring a best finish of 13th at Martinsville Speedway. In 2019, Roper attempted 11 races, scoring a best finish of 9th at Texas Motor Speedway and 3 other top 20 finishes. However, he also failed to qualify at Bristol Motor Speedway and Las Vegas Motor Speedway. In 2020, Roper attempted the first 12 races before not attempting another race that season. He got 3 top-20 finishes, including a 14th-place finish in the NextEra Energy 250.

In 2021, Roper was leading in the NextEra Energy 250 on the last lap but was passed by race winner Ben Rhodes and Jordan Anderson, finishing third. NASCAR Cup Series driver Chase Briscoe went on to drive three races, which included the team's second top-five finish at Bristol Motor Speedway.

The team did not attempt to qualify at any races during the 2022 season.

On January 31, 2023, the team announced that Kaden Honeycutt would be driving the entry during the first six races of the season. On February 22, Roper was indefinitely suspended by NASCAR for violating the substance abuse policy. He was reinstated on March 21.

For the 2024 season the No. 04 was shared between Roper and Marco Andretti. Roper finished 22nd at Daytona. At the Circuit of the Americas, Andretti finished 31st after the rear end assembly completely detached from his truck.

==== Truck No. 04 results ====
Year	Driver	No.	Make	1	2	3	4	5	6	7	8	9	10	11	12	13	14	15	16	17	18	19	20	21	22	23	NCTC	Pts
2018	Cory Roper	04	Ford	DAY	ATL	LVS	MAR; 13	DOV	KAN	CLT	TEX	IOW; 18	GTW	CHI	KEN	ELD	POC	MCH	BRI; 25	MSP	LVS; 25	TAL	MAR	TEX; 28	PHO	HOM; 17	36th	96
2019	Cory Roper	04	Ford	DAY; 20	ATL; 16	LVS; 24	MAR; 31	TEX; 12	DOV	KAN	CLT; 20	TEX; 9	IOW	GTW	CHI	KEN	POC	ELD	MCH; 28	BRI; DNQ		LVS; DNQ	TAL	MAR	PHO	HOM; 27	30th	158
2019	Roger Reuse (Note: Reuse drove a Jordan Anderson Racing entry using Roper's owner points.)	04	Chevy																		MSP; 26						30th	158
2020	Cory Roper	04	Ford	DAY; 14	LVS; 26	CLT; 32	ATL; 23	HOM; 21	POC; 25	KEN; 23	TEX; 17	KAN; 20	KAN; 36	MCH; 24	DRC; 26	DOV	GTW	DAR	RCH	BRI	LVS	TAL	KAN	TEX	MAR	PHO	35th	161
2021	Cory Roper	04	Ford	DAY; 3	DRC; 34	LVS; 36	ATL; 27		RCH; 31		DAR; 40	COA; 30	CLT; 25	TEX; 18	NSH; 31	POC			GTW; 17	DAR	BRI; 20	LVS; 28	TAL; 6	MAR; 37	PHO; 30		33rd	242
2021	Chase Briscoe	04	Ford					BRD; 5		KAN; 19							KNX; 36	GLN									33rd	242
2022	Cory Roper	04	Ford	DAY	LVS	ATL	COA	MAR	BRD	DAR	KAN	TEX	CLT	GTW	SON	KNO	NSH	MOH	POC	IRP	RCH	KAN	BRI	TAL; Wth	HOM	PHO	-	-
2023	Kaden Honeycutt	04	Ford	DAY; DNQ	LVS; 25	ATL; 33	COA; 15	TEX; Wth	BRD; 9	MAR; 28																	32nd	206
2023	Johnny Sauter	04	Ford								KAN; 19	DAR; 28	NWS; 36	CLT; Wth	GTW												32nd	206
2023	Cory Roper	04	Ford													NSH; 21		POC; 23	RCH					TAL; 22			32nd	206
2023	Landen Lewis	04	Chevy														MOH; 24			IRP; 28	MLW						32nd	206
2023	Spencer Davis	04	Ford																			KAN; 36	BRI		HOM; 32		32nd	206
2023	Spencer Davis	04	Chevy																							PHO; 17	32nd	206
2024	Cory Roper	04	Chevy	DAY; 22	ATL	LVS	BRI																TAL; 16				35th	79
2024	Marco Andretti	04	Chevy					COA; 31	MAR	TEX	KAN	DAR						IRP; 25	RCH	MLW; 31	BRI; DNQ	KAN; 34		HOM; 30	MAR		35th	79
2024	Clayton Green	04	Chevy										NWS; 34	CLT	GTW	NSH	POC										35th	79
2024	Andrés Pérez de Lara	04	Chevy																							PHO; 31	35th	79

^{*} Season still in progress
^{1} Ineligible for series points
