= Tate Fogleman =

American racing driver (born 2000)

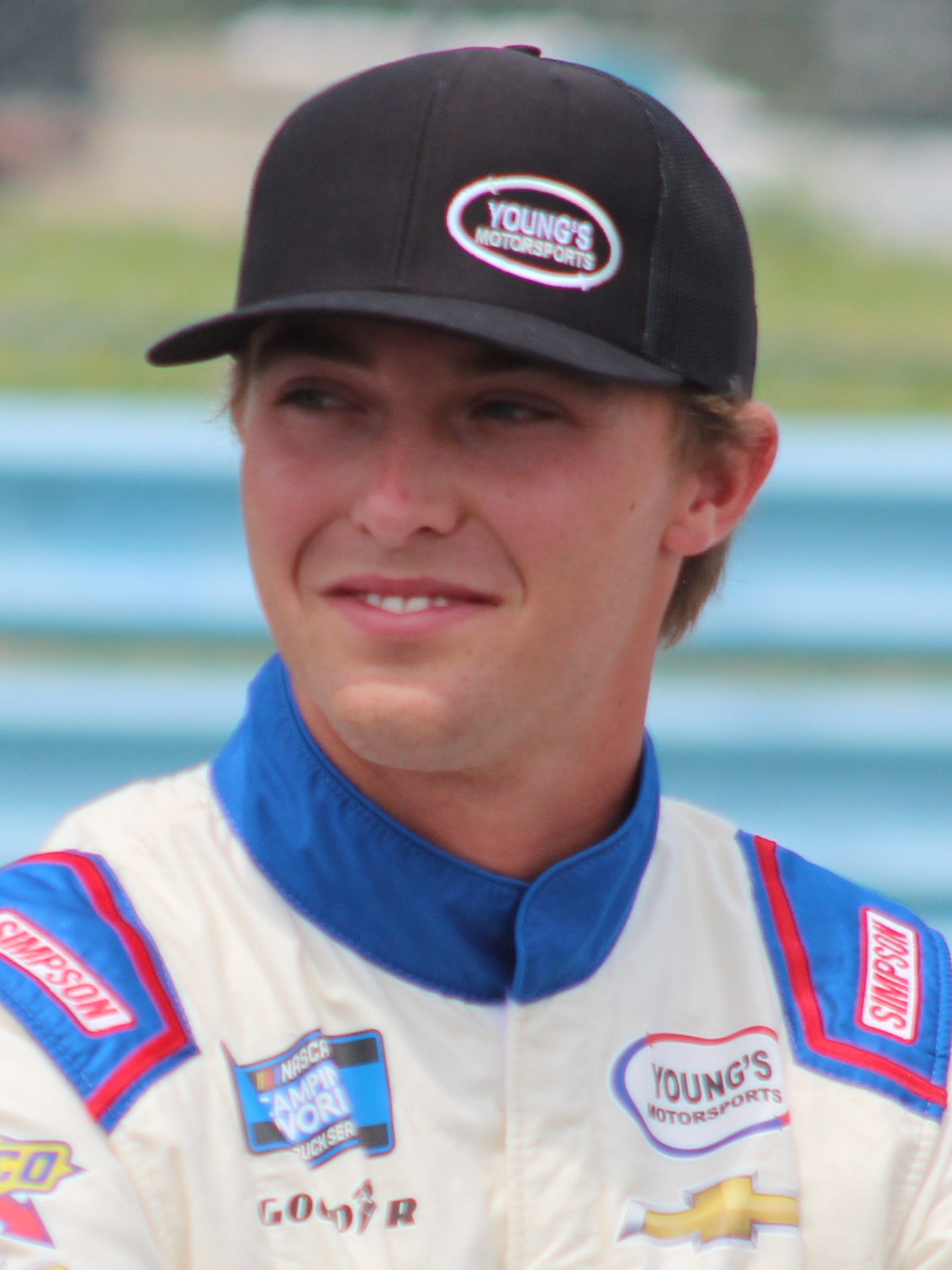
- Fogleman at Watkins Glen International in 2021
- Born: March 8, 2000 (age 26); Durham, North Carolina, U.S.
- Achievements: 2015 PASS South Super Late Model Series Champion; 2017 Throwback 276 Winner (SLM)

NASCAR FedEx Freight Truck Series career
- 60 races run over 4 years
- 2022 position: 31st
- Best finish: 17th (2020)
- First race: 2018 Eaton 200 (Gateway)
- Last race: 2022 CRC Brakleen 150 (Pocono)
- First win: 2021 Chevrolet Silverado 250 (Talladega)
Wins	Top tens	Poles
1	2	0
- Statistics up to date as of November 5, 2022.

Tate Fogleman (born March 8, 2000) is an American professional stock car racing driver. He last competed part-time in the NASCAR Camping World Truck Series, driving the No. 30 Toyota Tundra for On Point Motorsports and the No. 26 Chevrolet Silverado for Rackley W.A.R.

== Racing career ==
=== NASCAR Truck Series ===
Fogleman made his NASCAR debut in the Camping World Truck Series in 2018, driving the No. 20 Chevrolet Silverado for Young's Motorsports. His first race was at Gateway, where he finished 27th after starting fifteenth due to a crash with Justin Fontaine. He returned to the team at Kentucky, where he started sixteenth and finished 28th due to suspension problems.

After not racing in the series in 2019, Fogleman returned to Young's for the full 2020 Truck Series season, driving the No. 02.

For 2021, Fogleman stayed with Young's and switched to the No. 12, running another full season. He scored his first career win at Talladega by sending John Hunter Nemechek sideways and beating Tyler Hill by 0.052 seconds before both trucks crashed into the inner wall.

On November 30, 2021, On Point Motorsports announced that Fogleman would race full-time for the team in 2022, driving the No. 30 Toyota Tundra. However, he parted ways with the team after eleven races. He then joined Rackley W.A.R. for three races but failed to qualify for two of them. He has not raced in NASCAR since.

=== CARS Super Late Model Tour ===
Fogleman first started competing in the Late Model Tour in 2016, where he ran eight of the ten races and came in ninth in points standings. He returned to the series in 2017, where he ran eight of the thirteen races and also managed to lead 45 laps while finishing fifth in points standings.

== Personal life ==
Fogleman is the son of Jay Fogleman, who also has competed in both NASCAR and CARS Tour as well.

Fogleman is a business major at High Point University. He previously attended Durham Academy.

== Motorsports career results ==
=== NASCAR ===
(key) (Bold – Pole position awarded by qualifying time. Italics – Pole position earned by points standings or practice time. * – Most laps led.)

==== Camping World Truck Series ====
NASCAR Camping World Truck Series results
Year	Team	No.	Make	1	2	3	4	5	6	7	8	9	10	11	12	13	14	15	16	17	18	19	20	21	22	23	NCWTC	Pts	Ref
2018	Young's Motorsports	20	Chevy	DAY	ATL	LVS	MAR	DOV	KAN	CLT	TEX	IOW	GTW; 27	CHI	KEN; 28	ELD	POC	MCH; 15	BRI	MSP							50th	41	
2018	Young's Motorsports	12	Chevy																		LVS; DNQ	TAL	MAR	TEX	PHO	HOM	50th	41	
2020	Young's Motorsports	02	Chevy	DAY; 30	LVS; 19	CLT; 17	ATL; 31	HOM; 23	POC; 34	KEN; 21	TEX; 32	KAN; 22	KAN; 17	MCH; 13	DAY; 19	DOV; 27	GTW; 18	DAR; 15	RCH; 15	BRI; 21	LVS; 16	TAL; 31	KAN; 17	TEX; 33	MAR; 36	PHO; 19	17th	334	
2021	Young's Motorsports	12	Chevy	DAY; 30	DAY; 19	LVS; 20	ATL; 26	BRI; 23	RCH; 39	KAN; 36	DAR; 30	COA; 25	CLT; 37	TEX; 25	NSH; 20	POC; 21	KNX; 9	GLN; 26	GTW; 14	DAR; 38	BRI; 37	LVS; 14	TAL; 1	MAR; 18	PHO; 34		20th	283	
2022	On Point Motorsports	30	Toyota	DAY; 22	LVS; 12	ATL; 31	COA; 18	MAR; 22	BRI; 28	DAR; 32	KAN; 20	TEX; 22	CLT; 29	GTW; 21	SON	KNO											31st	167	
2022	Rackley W.A.R.	26	Chevy														NSH; DNQ	MOH	POC; 20	IRP	RCH	KAN; DNQ	BRI	TAL	HOM	PHO	31st	167	

=== CARS Late Model Stock Car Tour ===
(key) (Bold – Pole position awarded by qualifying time. Italics – Pole position earned by points standings or practice time. * – Most laps led. ** – All laps led.)

CARS Late Model Stock Car Tour results
Year	Team	No.	Make	1	2	3	4	5	6	7	8	9	10	11	12	13	14	15	16	17	CLMSCTC	Pts	Ref
2023	JFCO Motorsports	8F	Ford	SNM; 17	FLC; 23	HCY; DNQ															34th	61	
2023	JFCO Motorsports	87	Ford				ACE; DNQ			DOM; 24	CRW	HCY	ACE; 20	TCM	WKS	AAS	SBO	TCM	CRW		34th	61	
2023	JFCO Motorsports	87	Chevy					NWS; 23	LGY												34th	61	
2024	JFCO Motorsports	87F	Chevy	SNM	HCY	AAS	OCS	ACE	TCM	LGY	DOM; DNQ	CRW	HCY	NWS; 21	ACE	WCS	FLC	SBO	TCM	NWS	N/A	0	
2025	JFCO Motorsports	4F	Chevy	AAS; DNQ	WCS	CDL															32nd	85	
2025	JFCO Motorsports	8F	Chevy				OCS; 27	ACE	NWS; 8	LGY											32nd	85	
2025	JFCO Motorsports	8	Chevy								DOM; 26	CRW	HCY	AND	FLC	SBO	TCM	NWS; 27			32nd	85	
2026	JFCO Motorsports	8	Chevy	SNM; 27	WCS; 11	NSV; Wth	CRW	ACE	LGY	DOM	NWS; DNQ	HCY	AND	FLC	TCM	NPS					43rd	68	
2026	JFCO Motorsports	8F	Chevy														SBO; 25				43rd	68	

=== CARS Super Late Model Tour ===
(key)

CARS Super Late Model Tour results
Year	Team	No.	Make	1	2	3	4	5	6	7	8	9	10	11	12	13	CSLMTC	Pts	Ref
2016	Jay Fogleman	8	Ford	SNM; 23	ROU; 23	HCY	TCM; 5	GRE; 14	ROU; 18	CON	MYB; 8	HCY; 20	SNM; 4				9th	149	
2017	Jay Fogleman	8	Toyota	CON; 18	DOM	DOM											5th	223	
2017	Jay Fogleman	8	Ford				HCY; 2	HCY; 3	BRI	AND	ROU; 4	TCM; 4	ROU; 6				5th	223	
2017	Jay Fogleman	00	Ford											HCY; 1	CON	SBO; 7	5th	223	
2018	JFCO Motorsports	8	Ford	MYB; 14	NSH	ROU; 25	HCY; 5	BRI	AND	HCY; 9	ROU; 11	**SBO**; 4*					8th	133	
2019	JFCO Motorsports	8	Chevy	SNM; 12	HCY; 13	NSH	MMS; 4	BRI; 28	HCY; 4	ROU; 15	SBO; 3						4th	153	
2020	JFCO Motorsports	08	Chevy	SNM	HCY	JEN; 4	HCY	FCS	BRI	FLC	NSH						21st	30	

=== CARS Pro Late Model Tour ===
(key)

CARS Pro Late Model Tour results
Year	Team	No.	Make	1	2	3	4	5	6	7	8	9	10	11	12	13	CPLMTC	Pts	Ref
2023	Wilson Motorsports	15B	Toyota	SNM	HCY	ACE	NWS	TCM	DIL	CRW; 3	WKS	HCY	TCM	SBO	TCM	CRW	42nd	30	
2024	JFCO Motorsports	8	Chevy	SNM	HCY	OCS	ACE	TCM	CRW	HCY	NWS	ACE	FLC	SBO	TCM	NWS; 18	N/A	0	

=== IHRA Late Model Sportsman Series ===
(key) (Bold – Pole position awarded by qualifying time. Italics – Pole position earned by points standings or practice time. * – Most laps led. ** – All laps led.)

IHRA Late Model Sportsman Series
Year	Team	No.	Make	1	2	3	ISCSS	Pts	Ref
2026	JFCO Motorsports	8	Chevy	DUB	CDL; 1	AND	N/A	0	

^{*} Season still in progress
^{1} Ineligible for series points
