= 2021 SpeedyCash.com 220 =

Race details
- Race 11 of 22 of the 2021 NASCAR Camping World Truck Series
- Date: June 12, 2021
- Official name: SpeedyCash.com 220
- Location: Fort Worth, Texas, Texas Motor Speedway
- Course: Permanent racing facility
- Course length: 1.5 miles (2.4 km)
- Distance: 147 laps, 220.5 mi (354.858 km)
- Average speed: 114.761 miles per hour (184.690 km/h)

Pole position
| Driver | John Hunter Nemechek | Kyle Busch Motorsports |
- Grid positions set by competition-based formula

Most laps led
| Driver | John Hunter Nemechek | Kyle Busch Motorsports |
- Laps: 64

Winner
| No. 4 | John Hunter Nemechek | Kyle Busch Motorsports |

Television in the United States
- Network: Fox Sports 1
- Announcers: Vince Welch, Joey Logano, and Brad Keselowski

Radio in the United States
- Radio: Motor Racing Network

The 2021 SpeedyCash.com 220 was the 11th stock car race of the 2021 NASCAR Camping World Truck Series season, and the 25th iteration of the event. The race was held on June 12, 2021 in Fort Worth, Texas at Texas Motor Speedway, a 1.5 miles (2.4 km) permanent quad-oval racetrack. The race took 147 laps to complete. At race's end, John Hunter Nemechek of Kyle Busch Motorsports would win his 10th race overall in the NASCAR Camping World Truck Series and his 4th of the season. Chase Elliott, driving a one-off race for GMS Racing, and Grant Enfinger of ThorSport Racing would fill in the rest of the podium, finishing 2nd and 3rd, respectively.

== Background ==
The layout of Texas Motor Speedway, the venue where the race was held.

Texas Motor Speedway is a speedway located in the northernmost portion of the U.S. city of Fort Worth, Texas – the portion located in Denton County, Texas. The track measures 1.5 miles (2.4 km) around and is banked 24 degrees in the turns, and is of the oval design, where the front straightaway juts outward slightly. The track layout is similar to Charlotte Motor Speedway. The track is owned by Speedway Motorsports.

=== Entry list ===
| # | Driver | Team | Make |
|---|---|---|---|
| 1 | Hailie Deegan | David Gilliland Racing | Ford |
| 2 | Sheldon Creed | GMS Racing | Chevrolet |
| 02 | Kris Wright | Young's Motorsports | Chevrolet |
| 3 | Howie DiSavino III | Jordan Anderson Racing | Chevrolet |
| 4 | John Hunter Nemechek | Kyle Busch Motorsports | Toyota |
| 04 | Cory Roper | Roper Racing | Ford |
| 6 | Norm Benning | Norm Benning Racing | Chevrolet |
| 10 | Jennifer Jo Cobb | Jennifer Jo Cobb Racing | Ford |
| 12 | Tate Fogleman | Young's Motorsports | Chevrolet |
| 13 | Johnny Sauter | ThorSport Racing | Toyota |
| 15 | Tanner Gray | David Gilliland Racing | Ford |
| 16 | Austin Hill | Hattori Racing Enterprises | Toyota |
| 18 | Chandler Smith | Kyle Busch Motorsports | Toyota |
| 19 | Derek Kraus | McAnally–Hilgemann Racing | Toyota |
| 20 | Spencer Boyd | Young's Motorsports | Chevrolet |
| 21 | Zane Smith | GMS Racing | Chevrolet |
| 22 | Austin Wayne Self | AM Racing | Chevrolet |
| 23 | Chase Purdy | GMS Racing | Chevrolet |
| 24 | Chase Elliott | GMS Racing | Chevrolet |
| 25 | Josh Berry | Rackley W.A.R. | Chevrolet |
| 26 | Tyler Ankrum | GMS Racing | Chevrolet |
| 30 | Brennan Poole | On Point Motorsports | Toyota |
| 33 | Keith McGee | Reaume Brothers Racing | Chevrolet |
| 34 | Jesse Iwuji | Reaume Brothers Racing | Toyota |
| 38 | Todd Gilliland | Front Row Motorsports | Ford |
| 40 | Ryan Truex | Niece Motorsports | Chevrolet |
| 41 | Dawson Cram | Cram Racing Enterprises | Chevrolet |
| 42 | Carson Hocevar | Niece Motorsports | Chevrolet |
| 45 | Ross Chastain | Niece Motorsports | Chevrolet |
| 49 | Ray Ciccarelli | CMI Motorsports | Toyota |
| 51 | Drew Dollar | Kyle Busch Motorsports | Toyota |
| 52 | Stewart Friesen | Halmar Friesen Racing | Toyota |
| 56 | Tyler Hill | Hill Motorsports | Chevrolet |
| 88 | Matt Crafton | ThorSport Racing | Toyota |
| 98 | Grant Enfinger | ThorSport Racing | Toyota |
| 99 | Ben Rhodes | ThorSport Racing | Toyota |
Official entry list

== Starting lineup ==
Qualifying was determined by a qualifying metric system based on the last race, the 2021 North Carolina Education Lottery 200 and owner's points. As a result, John Hunter Nemechek of Kyle Busch Motorsports would win the pole.

| Pos. | # | Driver | Team | Make |
|---|---|---|---|---|
| 1 | 4 | John Hunter Nemechek | Kyle Busch Motorsports | Toyota |
| 2 | 99 | Ben Rhodes | ThorSport Racing | Toyota |
| 3 | 42 | Carson Hocevar | Niece Motorsports | Chevrolet |
| 4 | 38 | Todd Gilliland | Front Row Motorsports | Ford |
| 5 | 16 | Austin Hill | Hattori Racing Enterprises | Toyota |
| 6 | 52 | Stewart Friesen | Halmar Friesen Racing | Toyota |
| 7 | 21 | Zane Smith | GMS Racing | Chevrolet |
| 8 | 18 | Chandler Smith | Kyle Busch Motorsports | Toyota |
| 9 | 19 | Derek Kraus | McAnally–Hilgemann Racing | Toyota |
| 10 | 51 | Drew Dollar | Kyle Busch Motorsports | Toyota |
| 11 | 26 | Tyler Ankrum | GMS Racing | Chevrolet |
| 12 | 1 | Hailie Deegan | David Gilliland Racing | Ford |
| 13 | 22 | Austin Wayne Self | AM Racing | Chevrolet |
| 14 | 40 | Ryan Truex | Niece Motorsports | Chevrolet |
| 15 | 88 | Matt Crafton | ThorSport Racing | Toyota |
| 16 | 2 | Sheldon Creed | GMS Racing | Chevrolet |
| 17 | 13 | Johnny Sauter | ThorSport Racing | Toyota |
| 18 | 98 | Grant Enfinger | ThorSport Racing | Toyota |
| 19 | 02 | Kris Wright | Young's Motorsports | Chevrolet |
| 20 | 15 | Tanner Gray | David Gilliland Racing | Ford |
| 21 | 04 | Cory Roper | Roper Racing | Ford |
| 22 | 24 | Chase Elliott | GMS Racing | Chevrolet |
| 23 | 41 | Dawson Cram | Cram Racing Enterprises | Chevrolet |
| 24 | 45 | Ross Chastain | Niece Motorsports | Chevrolet |
| 25 | 56 | Tyler Hill | Hill Motorsports | Chevrolet |
| 26 | 20 | Spencer Boyd | Young's Motorsports | Chevrolet |
| 27 | 30 | Brennan Poole | On Point Motorsports | Toyota |
| 28 | 23 | Chase Purdy | GMS Racing | Chevrolet |
| 29 | 34 | Jesse Iwuji | Reaume Brothers Racing | Toyota |
| 30 | 3 | Howie DiSavino III | Jordan Anderson Racing | Chevrolet |
| 31 | 12 | Tate Fogleman | Young's Motorsports | Chevrolet |
| 32 | 10 | Jennifer Jo Cobb | Jennifer Jo Cobb Racing | Ford |
| 33 | 25 | Josh Berry | Rackley W.A.R. | Chevrolet |
| 34 | 33 | Keith McGee | Reaume Brothers Racing | Chevrolet |
| 35 | 6 | Norm Benning | Norm Benning Racing | Chevrolet |
| 36 | 49 | Ray Ciccarelli | CMI Motorsports | Toyota |
Official starting lineup

== Race results ==
Stage 1 Laps: 35

| Fin. | # | Driver | Team | Make | Pts |
|---|---|---|---|---|---|
| 1 | 4 | John Hunter Nemechek | Kyle Busch Motorsports | Toyota | 10 |
| 2 | 16 | Austin Hill | Hattori Racing Enterprises | Toyota | 9 |
| 3 | 99 | Ben Rhodes | ThorSport Racing | Toyota | 8 |
| 4 | 18 | Chandler Smith | Kyle Busch Motorsports | Toyota | 7 |
| 5 | 52 | Stewart Friesen | Halmar Friesen Racing | Toyota | 6 |
| 6 | 30 | Brennan Poole | On Point Motorsports | Toyota | 5 |
| 7 | 22 | Austin Wayne Self | AM Racing | Chevrolet | 4 |
| 8 | 19 | Derek Kraus | McAnally–Hilgemann Racing | Toyota | 3 |
| 9 | 38 | Todd Gilliland | Front Row Motorsports | Ford | 2 |
| 10 | 25 | Josh Berry | Rackley W.A.R. | Chevrolet | 0 |

Stage 2 Laps: 35

| Fin. | # | Driver | Team | Make | Pts |
|---|---|---|---|---|---|
| 1 | 21 | Zane Smith | GMS Racing | Chevrolet | 10 |
| 2 | 15 | Tanner Gray | David Gilliland Racing | Ford | 9 |
| 3 | 19 | Derek Kraus | McAnally–Hilgemann Racing | Toyota | 8 |
| 4 | 30 | Brennan Poole | On Point Motorsports | Toyota | 7 |
| 5 | 25 | Josh Berry | Rackley W.A.R. | Chevrolet | 0 |
| 6 | 24 | Chase Elliott | GMS Racing | Chevrolet | 0 |
| 7 | 18 | Chandler Smith | Kyle Busch Motorsports | Toyota | 4 |
| 8 | 4 | John Hunter Nemechek | Kyle Busch Motorsports | Toyota | 3 |
| 9 | 98 | Grant Enfinger | ThorSport Racing | Toyota | 2 |
| 10 | 16 | Austin Hill | Hattori Racing Enterprises | Toyota | 1 |

Stage 3 Laps: 77

| Fin | St | # | Driver | Team | Make | Laps | Led | Status | Pts |
|---|---|---|---|---|---|---|---|---|---|
| 1 | 1 | 4 | John Hunter Nemechek | Kyle Busch Motorsports | Toyota | 147 | 64 | running | 52 |
| 2 | 22 | 24 | Chase Elliott | GMS Racing | Chevrolet | 147 | 45 | running | 0 |
| 3 | 18 | 98 | Grant Enfinger | ThorSport Racing | Toyota | 147 | 0 | running | 34 |
| 4 | 5 | 16 | Austin Hill | Hattori Racing Enterprises | Toyota | 147 | 0 | running | 41 |
| 5 | 8 | 18 | Chandler Smith | Kyle Busch Motorsports | Toyota | 147 | 0 | running | 41 |
| 6 | 7 | 21 | Zane Smith | GMS Racing | Chevrolet | 147 | 12 | running | 40 |
| 7 | 4 | 38 | Todd Gilliland | Front Row Motorsports | Ford | 147 | 8 | running | 31 |
| 8 | 11 | 26 | Tyler Ankrum | GMS Racing | Chevrolet | 147 | 0 | running | 28 |
| 9 | 20 | 15 | Tanner Gray | David Gilliland Racing | Ford | 147 | 7 | running | 36 |
| 10 | 33 | 25 | Josh Berry | Rackley W.A.R. | Chevrolet | 147 | 0 | running | 0 |
| 11 | 3 | 42 | Carson Hocevar | Niece Motorsports | Chevrolet | 147 | 0 | running | 25 |
| 12 | 17 | 13 | Johnny Sauter | ThorSport Racing | Toyota | 147 | 0 | running | 24 |
| 13 | 9 | 19 | Derek Kraus | McAnally–Hilgemann Racing | Toyota | 146 | 0 | running | 34 |
| 14 | 27 | 30 | Brennan Poole | On Point Motorsports | Toyota | 146 | 0 | running | 34 |
| 15 | 13 | 22 | Austin Wayne Self | AM Racing | Chevrolet | 146 | 0 | running | 25 |
| 16 | 14 | 40 | Ryan Truex | Niece Motorsports | Chevrolet | 146 | 0 | running | 20 |
| 17 | 28 | 23 | Chase Purdy | GMS Racing | Chevrolet | 145 | 0 | running | 19 |
| 18 | 21 | 04 | Cory Roper | Roper Racing | Ford | 145 | 0 | running | 18 |
| 19 | 25 | 56 | Tyler Hill | Hill Motorsports | Chevrolet | 145 | 0 | running | 17 |
| 20 | 15 | 88 | Matt Crafton | ThorSport Racing | Toyota | 144 | 0 | running | 16 |
| 21 | 23 | 41 | Dawson Cram | Cram Racing Enterprises | Chevrolet | 144 | 0 | running | 15 |
| 22 | 19 | 02 | Kris Wright | Young's Motorsports | Chevrolet | 144 | 0 | running | 14 |
| 23 | 30 | 3 | Howie DiSavino III | Jordan Anderson Racing | Chevrolet | 143 | 0 | running | 13 |
| 24 | 12 | 1 | Hailie Deegan | David Gilliland Racing | Ford | 142 | 0 | running | 12 |
| 25 | 31 | 12 | Tate Fogleman | Young's Motorsports | Chevrolet | 142 | 0 | running | 11 |
| 26 | 2 | 99 | Ben Rhodes | ThorSport Racing | Toyota | 141 | 6 | running | 18 |
| 27 | 26 | 20 | Spencer Boyd | Young's Motorsports | Chevrolet | 141 | 0 | running | 9 |
| 28 | 29 | 34 | Jesse Iwuji | Reaume Brothers Racing | Toyota | 141 | 0 | running | 8 |
| 29 | 34 | 33 | Keith McGee | Reaume Brothers Racing | Chevrolet | 140 | 0 | running | 7 |
| 30 | 35 | 6 | Norm Benning | Norm Benning Racing | Chevrolet | 134 | 0 | running | 6 |
| 31 | 32 | 10 | Jennifer Jo Cobb | Jennifer Jo Cobb Racing | Ford | 131 | 0 | running | 5 |
| 32 | 36 | 49 | Ray Ciccarelli | CMI Motorsports | Toyota | 89 | 0 | brakes | 4 |
| 33 | 10 | 51 | Drew Dollar | Kyle Busch Motorsports | Toyota | 68 | 0 | accident | 3 |
| 34 | 6 | 52 | Stewart Friesen | Halmar Friesen Racing | Toyota | 52 | 0 | accident | 8 |
| 35 | 16 | 2 | Sheldon Creed | GMS Racing | Chevrolet | 18 | 0 | accident | 1 |
| 36 | 24 | 45 | Ross Chastain | Niece Motorsports | Chevrolet | 147 | 5 | running/DQ | 0 |
Official race results

| Previous race: 2021 North Carolina Education Lottery 200 | NASCAR Camping World Truck Series; 2021 season | Next race: 2021 Rackley Roofing 200 |
