= Bryant Barnhill =

American racing driver (born 1998)

- Born: Bryant Christopher Barnhill; August 11, 1998 (age 28); Conway, South Carolina, U.S.

NASCAR FedEx Freight Truck Series career
- 8 races run over 3 years
- 2020 position: 52nd
- Best finish: 52nd (2020)
- First race: 2018 Eaton 200 (Gateway)
- Last race: 2020 South Carolina Education Lottery 200 (Darlington)
Wins	Top tens	Poles
0	0	0
- Statistics up to date as of November 11, 2020.

Bryant Christopher Barnhill (born August 11, 1998) is an American professional stock car racing driver. He last competed part-time in the NASCAR Gander RV & Outdoors Truck Series, driving the Nos. 34 and 33 Toyota Tundras for Reaume Brothers Racing.

== Racing career ==
=== Gander RV & Outdoors Truck Series ===
In 2018, Barnhill began his NASCAR career. He was initially scheduled to drive for Mike Harmon Racing at Iowa Speedway, but failed to qualify. He then ran the next race at Gateway Motorsports Park for Jordan Anderson Racing, and finished 31st after running only five laps due to engine problems.

In 2019, Barnhill joined Reaume Brothers Racing.

=== NASCAR K&N Pro Series West ===
Barnhill participated in the Iowa race in 2017. He drove the No. 34 Chevrolet for Jesse Iwuji and finished 33rd after starting 28th.

=== CARS Late Model Stock Tour ===
Barnhill started his racing career in 2015, where he has only ran the Myrtle Beach race both in his debut year and the following year. In 2015, he also attempted to run the first race at Kenly, but did not qualify.

In 2018, Barnhill ran the second race at Myrtle Beach in the No. 17 Chevrolet for his own team. He finished twentieth after starting 25th.

== Personal life ==
Barnhill is an avid Christian and graduated from Conway Christian School. He is a third-generation racing driver and has received coaching from former driver Chad McCumbee.

== Motorsports career results ==
=== NASCAR ===
(key) (Bold – Pole position awarded by qualifying time. Italics – Pole position earned by points standings or practice time. * – Most laps led.)

==== Gander RV & Outdoors Truck Series ====
NASCAR Gander RV & Outdoors Truck Series results
Year	Team	No.	Make	1	2	3	4	5	6	7	8	9	10	11	12	13	14	15	16	17	18	19	20	21	22	23	NGTC	Pts	Ref
2018	Mike Harmon Racing	74	Chevy	DAY	ATL	LVS	MAR	DOV	KAN	CLT	TEX	IOW; DNQ															86th	6	
2018	Jordan Anderson Racing	15	Chevy										GTW; 31	CHI	KEN	ELD	POC	MCH	BRI	MSP	LVS	TAL	MAR	TEX	PHO	HOM	86th	6	
2019	Reaume Brothers Racing	34	Chevy	DAY	ATL	LVS	MAR	TEX	DOV	KAN	CLT	TEX	IOW	GTW; 22	CHI	KEN											70th	25	
2019	Reaume Brothers Racing	32	Chevy														POC; 27	ELD	MCH	BRI	MSP	LVS	TAL	MAR	PHO	HOM	70th	25	
2020	Reaume Brothers Racing	34	Toyota	DAY	LVS	CLT; DNQ	ATL; DNQ																				52nd	31	
2020	Reaume Brothers Racing	34	Chevy					HOM; 38	POC																		52nd	31	
2020	Reaume Brothers Racing	33	Toyota							KEN; 33	TEX	KAN	KAN	MCH	DAY												52nd	31	
2020	Reaume Brothers Racing	33	Chevy													DOV; 33	GTW; 26	DAR; 34	RCH	BRI	LVS	TAL	KAN	TEX	MAR	PHO	52nd	31	

==== K&N Pro Series West ====
NASCAR K&N Pro Series West results
Year	Team	No.	Make	1	2	3	4	5	6	7	8	9	10	11	12	13	14	NKNPSWC	Pts	Ref
2017	Patriot Motorsports Group	34	Chevy	KCR	TUS	IRW	IRW	SPO	OSS	CNS	SON	IOW; 33	EVG	DCS	MER	AAS	KCR	64th	11	

=== CARS Late Model Stock Car Tour ===
(key) (Bold – Pole position awarded by qualifying time. Italics – Pole position earned by points standings or practice time. * – Most laps led. ** – All laps led.)

CARS Late Model Stock Car Tour results
Year	Team	No.	Make	1	2	3	4	5	6	7	8	9	10	11	12	13	14	15	16	CLMSCTC	Pts	Ref
2015	Chris Barnhill	5B	N/A	SNM; DNQ	ROU	HCY	SNM	TCM	MMS	ROU	CON	MYB; 28	HCY							60th	6	
2016	Chris Barnhill	5B	N/A	SNM	ROU	HCY	TCM	GRE	ROU	CON	MYB; 21	HCY	SNM							59th	12	
2018	Chris Barnhill	17	Chevy	TCM	MYB; 20	ROU	HCY	BRI	ACE	CCS	KPT	HCY	WKS	ROU	SBO					68th	13	
2021	Chris Barnhill	5B	Chevy	DIL	HCY	OCS	ACE	CRW	LGY	DOM	HCY	MMS	TCM	FLC	WKS	SBO; 12				44th	21	
2023	Chris Barnhill	5B	Chevy	SNM	FLC; 10	HCY; DNQ	ACE; 23	NWS; 27	LGY; 19	DOM; 19	CRW; 28									30th	81	
2023	Chris Barnhill	92	Chevy									HCY; 25	ACE	TCM	WKS	AAS	SBO	TCM	CRW	30th	81	

^{*} Season still in progress
^{1} Ineligible for series points
