= 2020 Vet Tix/Camping World 200 =

Race details
- Race 4 of 23 in the 2020 NASCAR Gander RV & Outdoors Truck Series season
- Date: June 6, 2020
- Location: Atlanta Motor Speedway in Hampton, Georgia
- Course: Permanent racing facility
- Course length: 1.54 miles (2.478 km)
- Distance: 136 laps, 209.44 mi (337.061 km)
- Scheduled distance: 130 laps, 200.2 mi (322.191 km)

Pole position
Driver	Christian Eckes	Kyle Busch Motorsports
- Time: N/A

Most laps led
Driver	Kyle Busch	Kyle Busch Motorsports
- Laps: 37

Winner
No. 98	Grant Enfinger	ThorSport Racing

Television in the United States
- Network: FS1

Radio in the United States
- Radio: MRN

The 2020 Vet Tix/Camping World 200 was a NASCAR Gander RV & Outdoors Truck Series race held on June 6, 2020, at Atlanta Motor Speedway in Hampton, Georgia. Contested over 136 laps due to an overtime finish on the 1.54-mile-long (2.48 km) asphalt quad-oval intermediate speedway, it was the fourth race of the 2020 NASCAR Gander RV & Outdoors Truck Series season. Grant Enfinger, driving for ThorSport Racing, won the race, his 2nd win this season. Johnny Sauter was going to be awarded a third-place finish, but after a tire violation, he was disqualified to a last-place finish.

== Entry list ==
No.	Driver	Team	Manufacturer
00	Angela Ruch	Reaume Brothers Racing	Toyota
02	Tate Fogleman (R)	Young's Motorsports	Chevrolet
2	Sheldon Creed	GMS Racing	Chevrolet
03	Tim Viens	Mike Affarano Racing	Chevrolet
3	Jordan Anderson	Jordan Anderson Racing	Chevrolet
04	Cory Roper	Roper Racing	Ford
4	Raphaël Lessard (R)	Kyle Busch Motorsports	Toyota
6	Norm Benning	Norm Benning Racing	Chevrolet
7	Korbin Forrister	All Out Motorsports	Toyota
8	John Hunter Nemechek (i)	NEMCO Motorsports	Ford
10	Jennifer Jo Cobb	Jennifer Jo Cobb Racing	Chevrolet
11	Spencer Davis (R)	Spencer Davis Motorsports	Toyota
13	Johnny Sauter	ThorSport Racing	Ford
14	Trey Hutchens	Trey Hutchens Racing	Chevrolet
15	Tanner Gray (R)	DGR-Crosley	Ford
16	Austin Hill	Hattori Racing Enterprises	Toyota
17	David Ragan	DGR-Crosley	Ford
18	Christian Eckes (R)	Kyle Busch Motorsports	Toyota
19	Derek Kraus (R)	McAnally-Hilgemann Racing	Toyota
20	Spencer Boyd	Young's Motorsports	Chevrolet
21	Zane Smith (R)	GMS Racing	Chevrolet
22	Austin Wayne Self	AM Racing	Chevrolet
23	Brett Moffitt	GMS Racing	Chevrolet
24	Chase Elliott (i)	GMS Racing	Chevrolet
26	Tyler Ankrum	GMS Racing	Chevrolet
28	Bryan Dauzat	FDNY Racing	Chevrolet
30	Brennan Poole (i)	On Point Motorsports	Toyota
33	Gray Gaulding	Reaume Brothers Racing	Toyota
34	Bryant Barnhill	Reaume Brothers Racing	Toyota
38	Todd Gilliland	Front Row Motorsports	Ford
40	Ryan Truex	Niece Motorsports	Chevrolet
42	Ross Chastain (i)	Niece Motorsports	Chevrolet
44	Jeb Burton (i)	Niece Motorsports	Chevrolet
45	Ty Majeski (R)	Niece Motorsports	Chevrolet
49	Bayley Currey (i)	CMI Motorsports	Chevrolet
51	Kyle Busch (i)	Kyle Busch Motorsports	Toyota
52	Stewart Friesen	Halmar Friesen Racing	Toyota
55	Dawson Cram	Long Motorsports	Chevrolet
56	Timmy Hill	Hill Motorsports	Chevrolet
68	Clay Greenfield	Clay Greenfield Motorsports	Toyota
75	Parker Kligerman	Henderson Motorsports	Chevrolet
83	T. J. Bell	CMI Motorsports	Chevrolet
88	Matt Crafton	ThorSport Racing	Ford
97	Jesse Little (i)	Diversified Motorsports Enterprises	Chevrolet
98	Grant Enfinger	ThorSport Racing	Ford
99	Ben Rhodes	ThorSport Racing	Ford

== Qualifying ==
For qualifying, drivers will line up based on last year's owner points.

=== Qualifying results ===
Pos	No	Driver	Team	Manufacturer	Time
1	18	Christian Eckes (R)	Kyle Busch Motorsports	Toyota	
2	26	Tyler Ankrum	GMS Racing	Chevrolet	
3	23	Brett Moffitt	GMS Racing	Chevrolet	
4	16	Austin Hill	Hattori Racing Enterprises	Toyota	
5	98	Grant Enfinger	ThorSport Racing	Ford	
6	51	Kyle Busch (i)	Kyle Busch Motorsports	Toyota	
7	21	Zane Smith (R)	GMS Racing	Chevrolet	
8	99	Ben Rhodes	ThorSport Racing	Ford	
9	2	Sheldon Creed	GMS Racing	Chevrolet	
10	13	Johnny Sauter	ThorSport Racing	Ford	
11	19	Derek Kraus (R)	McAnally-Hilgemann Racing	Toyota	
12	38	Todd Gilliland	Front Row Motorsports	Ford	
13	24	Chase Elliott (i)	GMS Racing	Chevrolet	
14	88	Matt Crafton	ThorSport Racing	Ford	
15	3	Jordan Anderson	Jordan Anderson Racing	Chevrolet	
16	9	Codie Rohrbaugh	CR7 Motorsports	Chevrolet	
17	52	Stewart Friesen	Halmar Friesen Racing	Toyota	
18	45	Ty Majeski (R)	Niece Motorsports	Chevrolet	
19	4	Raphaël Lessard (R)	Kyle Busch Motorsports	Toyota	
20	40	Ryan Truex	Niece Motorsports	Chevrolet	
21	15	Tanner Gray (R)	DGR-Crosley	Ford	
22	02	Tate Fogleman (R)	Young's Motorsports	Chevrolet	
23	56	Timmy Hill	Hill Motorsports	Chevrolet	
24	04	Cory Roper	Roper Racing	Ford	
25	30	Brennan Poole (i)	On Point Motorsports	Toyota	
26	44	Jeb Burton (i)	Niece Motorsports	Chevrolet	
27	42	Ross Chastain (i)	Niece Motorsports	Chevrolet	
28	22	Austin Wayne Self	AM Racing	Chevrolet	
29	8	John Hunter Nemechek (i)	NEMCO Motorsports	Ford	
30	00	Angela Ruch	Reaume Brothers Racing	Toyota	
31	20	Spencer Boyd	Young's Motorsports	Chevrolet	
32	33	Gray Gaulding	Reaume Brothers Racing	Toyota	
33	7	Korbin Forrister	All Out Motorsports	Toyota	
34	11	Spencer Davis (R)	Spencer Davis Motorsports	Toyota	
35	97	Jesse Little (i)	Diversified Motorsports Enterprises	Chevrolet	
36	83	T. J. Bell	CMI Motorsports	Chevrolet	
37	28	Bryan Dauzat	FDNY Racing	Chevrolet	
38	10	Jennifer Jo Cobb	Jennifer Jo Cobb Racing	Chevrolet	
39	49	Bayley Currey (i)	CMI Motorsports	Chevrolet	
40	68	Clay Greenfield	Clay Greenfield Motorsports	Toyota	
Failed to qualify
41	6	Norm Benning	Norm Benning Racing	Chevrolet	
42	03	Tim Viens	Mike Affarano Racing	Chevrolet	
43	14	Trey Hutchens	Trey Hutchens Racing	Chevrolet	
44	34	Bryant Barnhill	Reaume Brothers Racing	Toyota	
45	55	Dawson Cram	Long Motorsports	Chevrolet	
46	75	Parker Kligerman	Henderson Motorsports	Chevrolet	
47	17	David Ragan	DGR-Crosley	Ford	

== Race ==
=== Stage Results ===
Stage One Laps: 31

Pos	No	Driver	Team	Manufacturer	Points
1	51	Kyle Busch (i)	Kyle Busch Motorsports	Toyota	0
2	24	Chase Elliott (i)	GMS Racing	Chevrolet	0
3	18	Christian Eckes (R)	Kyle Busch Motorsports	Toyota	8
4	21	Zane Smith (R)	GMS Racing	Chevrolet	7
5	16	Austin Hill	Hattori Racing Enterprises	Toyota	6
6	23	Brett Moffitt	GMS Racing	Chevrolet	5
7	2	Sheldon Creed	GMS Racing	Chevrolet	4
8	42	Ross Chastain (i)	Niece Motorsports	Chevrolet	0
9	98	Grant Enfinger	ThorSport Racing	Ford	2
10	38	Todd Gilliland	Front Row Motorsports	Ford	1

Stage Two Laps: 40

Pos	No	Driver	Team	Manufacturer	Points
1	51	Kyle Busch (i)	Kyle Busch Motorsports	Toyota	0
2	98	Grant Enfinger	ThorSport Racing	Ford	9
3	19	Derek Kraus (R)	McAnally-Hilgemann Racing	Toyota	8
4	42	Ross Chastain (i)	Niece Motorsports	Chevrolet	0
5	38	Todd Gilliland	Front Row Motorsports	Ford	6
6	18	Christian Eckes (R)	Kyle Busch Motorsports	Toyota	5
7	13	Johnny Sauter	ThorSport Racing	Ford	4
8	4	Raphaël Lessard (R)	Kyle Busch Motorsports	Toyota	3
9	88	Matt Crafton	ThorSport Racing	Ford	2
10	16	Austin Hill	Hattori Racing Enterprises	Toyota	1

=== Final Stage Results ===
Stage Three Laps: 50

Pos	Grid	No	Driver	Team	Manufacturer	Laps	Points
1	5	98	Grant Enfinger	ThorSport Racing	Ford	136	51
2	4	16	Austin Hill	Hattori Racing Enterprises	Toyota	136	43
3	1	18	Christian Eckes (R)	Kyle Busch Motorsports	Toyota	136	47
4	12	38	Todd Gilliland	Front Row Motorsports	Ford	136	40
5	7	21	Zane Smith (R)	GMS Racing	Chevrolet	136	39
6	27	42	Ross Chastain (i)	Niece Motorsports	Chevrolet	136	0
7	11	19	Derek Kraus (R)	McAnally-Hilgemann Racing	Toyota	136	38
8	3	23	Brett Moffitt	GMS Racing	Chevrolet	136	34
9	8	99	Ben Rhodes	ThorSport Racing	Ford	136	29
10	17	52	Stewart Friesen	Halmar Friesen Racing	Toyota	136	27
11	21	15	Tanner Gray (R)	DGR-Crosley	Ford	136	26
12	14	88	Matt Crafton	ThorSport Racing	Ford	136	28
13	20	40	Ryan Truex	Niece Motorsports	Chevrolet	136	24
14	9	2	Sheldon Creed	GMS Racing	Chevrolet	136	27
15	2	26	Tyler Ankrum	GMS Racing	Chevrolet	136	22
16	26	44	Jeb Burton (i)	Niece Motorsports	Chevrolet	136	0
17	25	30	Brennan Poole (i)	On Point Motorsports	Toyota	136	0
18	19	4	Raphaël Lessard (R)	Kyle Busch Motorsports	Toyota	136	23
19	18	45	Ty Majeski (R)	Niece Motorsports	Chevrolet	135	18
20	13	24	Chase Elliott (i)	GMS Racing	Chevrolet	135	0
21	6	51	Kyle Busch (i)	Kyle Busch Motorsports	Toyota	135	0
22	23	56	Timmy Hill	Hill Motorsports	Chevrolet	135	15
23	24	04	Cory Roper	Roper Racing	Ford	135	14
24	29	8	John Hunter Nemechek (i)	NEMCO Motorsports	Ford	135	0
25	34	11	Spencer Davis (R)	Spencer Davis Motorsports	Toyota	134	12
26	40	68	Clay Greenfield	Clay Greenfield Motorsports	Toyota	134	11
27	31	20	Spencer Boyd	Young's Motorsports	Chevrolet	134	10
28	30	00	Angela Ruch	Reaume Brothers Racing	Toyota	134	9
29	33	7	Korbin Forrister	All Out Motorsports	Toyota	134	8
30	28	22	Austin Wayne Self	AM Racing	Chevrolet	132	7
31	22	02	Tate Fogleman (R)	Young's Motorsports	Chevrolet	132	6
32	39	49	Bayley Currey (i)	CMI Motorsports	Chevrolet	131	0
33	16	9	Codie Rohrbaugh	CR7 Motorsports	Chevrolet	130	5
34	32	33	Gray Gaulding	Reaume Brothers Racing	Toyota	129	5
35	35	97	Jesse Little (i)	Diversified Motorsports Enterprises	Chevrolet	127	0
36	38	10	Jennifer Jo Cobb	Jennifer Jo Cobb Racing	Chevrolet	109	5
37	15	3	Jordan Anderson	Jordan Anderson Racing	Chevrolet	95	5
38	36	83	T. J. Bell	CMI Motorsports	Chevrolet	53	5
39	37	28	Bryan Dauzat	FDNY Racing	Chevrolet	4	5
40	10	13	Johnny Sauter	ThorSport Racing	Ford	136	5

Previous race: 2020 North Carolina Education Lottery 200	NASCAR Gander RV & Outdoors Truck Series; 2020 season	Next race: 2020 Baptist Health 200
