= 2020 Baptist Health 200 =

Race details
- Race 5 of 23 of the 2020 NASCAR Gander RV & Outdoors Truck Series
- Date: June 13, 2020
- Official name: Baptist Health 200
- Location: Homestead, Florida, Homestead–Miami Speedway
- Course: Permanent racing facility
- Course length: 1.5 miles (2.41 km)
- Distance: 134 laps, 201 mi (323.478 km)
- Scheduled distance: 134 laps, 201 mi (323.478 km)
- Average speed: 105.435 miles per hour (169.681 km/h)

Pole position
Driver	Austin Hill	Hattori Racing Enterprises
- Grid positions set by ballot

Most laps led
Driver	Kyle Busch	Kyle Busch Motorsports
- Laps: 82

Winner
No. 51	Kyle Busch	Kyle Busch Motorsports

Television in the United States
- Network: Fox Sports 1
- Announcers: Vince Welch, Phil Parsons, and Michael Waltrip

Radio in the United States
- Radio: Motor Racing Network

The 2020 Baptist Health 200 was the 5th stock car race of the 2020 NASCAR Gander RV & Outdoors Truck Series season, and the 25th iteration of the event. The race was held on Saturday, June 13, 2020 in Homestead, Florida at Homestead–Miami Speedway, a 1.5 miles (2.4 km) permanent oval-shaped racetrack. The race took 134 laps to complete. At the end, Kyle Busch of Kyle Busch Motorsports would cruise on the final restart to win the race, the 58th of his career in the NASCAR Gander RV & Outdoors Truck Series and the 2nd of the season. To fill the podium, Tyler Ankrum of GMS Racing and Ross Chastain of Niece Motorsports would finish 2nd and 3rd, respectively.

== Background ==
The layout of Homestead–Miami Speedway, the venue where the race was held.

Homestead-Miami Speedway is a motor racing track located in Homestead, Florida. The track, which has several configurations, has promoted several series of racing, including NASCAR, the NTT IndyCar Series and the Grand-Am Rolex Sports Car Series

From 2002 to 2019 and 2026, Homestead–Miami Speedway hosted the final race of the season in all three of NASCAR's series.

=== Entry list ===
#	Driver	Team	Make
00	Angela Ruch	Reaume Brothers Racing	Toyota
2	Sheldon Creed	GMS Racing	Chevrolet
02	Tate Fogleman	Young's Motorsports	Chevrolet
3	Jordan Anderson	Jordan Anderson Racing	Chevrolet
03	Tim Viens*	Mike Affarano Motorsports	Chevrolet
4	Raphaël Lessard	Kyle Busch Motorsports	Toyota
04	Cory Roper	Roper Racing	Ford
6	Norm Benning	Norm Benning Racing	Chevrolet
7	Korbin Forrister	All Out Motorsports	Toyota
9	Codie Rohrbaugh	CR7 Motorsports	Chevrolet
10	Jennifer Jo Cobb	Jennifer Jo Cobb Racing	Chevrolet
11	Spencer Davis	Spencer Davis Motorsports	Toyota
13	Johnny Sauter	ThorSport Racing	Ford
15	Tanner Gray	DGR-Crosley	Ford
16	Austin Hill	Hattori Racing Enterprises	Toyota
18	Christian Eckes	Kyle Busch Motorsports	Toyota
19	Derek Kraus	McAnally–Hilgemann Racing	Toyota
20	Spencer Boyd	Young's Motorsports	Chevrolet
21	Zane Smith	GMS Racing	Chevrolet
22	Austin Wayne Self	AM Racing	Chevrolet
23	Brett Moffitt	GMS Racing	Chevrolet
24	Chase Elliott	GMS Racing	Chevrolet
26	Tyler Ankrum	GMS Racing	Chevrolet
30	Brennan Poole	On Point Motorsports	Toyota
33	Gray Gaulding	Reaume Brothers Racing	Toyota
34	Bryant Barnhill	Reaume Brothers Racing	Chevrolet
38	Todd Gilliland	Front Row Motorsports	Ford
40	T. J. Bell	Niece Motorsports	Chevrolet
44	Ross Chastain	Niece Motorsports	Chevrolet
45	Ty Majeski	Niece Motorsports	Chevrolet
49	Bayley Currey**	CMI Motorsports	Chevrolet
51	Kyle Busch	Kyle Busch Motorsports	Toyota
52	Stewart Friesen	Halmar Friesen Racing	Toyota
55	Dawson Cram	Long Motorsports	Chevrolet
56	Tyler Hill	Hill Motorsports	Chevrolet
68	Clay Greenfield	Clay Greenfield Motorsports	Toyota
83	Ray Ciccarelli***	CMI Motorsports	Chevrolet
88	Matt Crafton	ThorSport Racing	Ford
98	Grant Enfinger	ThorSport Racing	Ford
99	Ben Rhodes	ThorSport Racing	Ford
Official entry list

*Withdrew due to the team not passing technical inspection. This would cause Tim Viens to cut ties with Mike Affarano Motorsports, saying "I did everything I was supposed to do. Secured the ride with the team, Mike Affarano Motorsports. Did everything financially I was supposed to do. Paid for the ride. I paid for all of the hotels. I bought three sets of sticker tires today before the race, that was $6,500. I paid for a first-class pit crew that was $3,500. I paid $2,000 for the transporter to get down here. Everything I was supposed to do. I was at the track, and was ready to go. This sucks. It really sucks.”

**Driver switched to Ray Ciccarelli.

**Withdrew the car after Bayley Currey, who was originally supposed to drive the #49, left the team. Currey would leave the team due to Ray Ciccarelli's announcement that his team would leave NASCAR after the league banned the Confederate flag, causing major controversy on the team and Ciccarelli. Currey would later confirm he left in a reply to a question on Twitter. As a result, Ciccarelli would drive the #49.

== Starting lineup ==
The starting lineup was based on a random draw. As a result, Austin Hill of Hattori Racing Enterprises won the pole.

Pos.	#	Driver	Team	Make
1	16	Austin Hill	Hattori Racing Enterprises	Toyota
2	51	Kyle Busch	Kyle Busch Motorsports	Toyota
3	98	Grant Enfinger	ThorSport Racing	Ford
4	18	Christian Eckes	Kyle Busch Motorsports	Toyota
5	99	Ben Rhodes	ThorSport Racing	Ford
6	21	Zane Smith	GMS Racing	Chevrolet
7	19	Derek Kraus	McAnally–Hilgemann Racing	Toyota
8	2	Sheldon Creed	GMS Racing	Chevrolet
9	23	Brett Moffitt	GMS Racing	Chevrolet
10	13	Johnny Sauter	ThorSport Racing	Ford
11	26	Tyler Ankrum	GMS Racing	Chevrolet
12	9	Codie Rohrbaugh	CR7 Motorsports	Chevrolet
13	88	Matt Crafton	ThorSport Racing	Ford
14	4	Raphaël Lessard	Kyle Busch Motorsports	Toyota
15	44	Ross Chastain	Niece Motorsports	Chevrolet
16	24	Chase Elliott	GMS Racing	Chevrolet
17	40	T. J. Bell	Niece Motorsports	Chevrolet
18	38	Todd Gilliland	Front Row Motorsports	Ford
19	52	Stewart Friesen	Halmar Friesen Racing	Toyota
20	15	Tanner Gray	DGR-Crosley	Ford
21	45	Ty Majeski	Niece Motorsports	Chevrolet
22	33	Gray Gaulding	Reaume Brothers Racing	Toyota
23	7	Korbin Forrister	All Out Motorsports	Toyota
24	04	Cory Roper	Roper Racing	Ford
25	3	Jordan Anderson	Jordan Anderson Racing	Chevrolet
26	30	Brennan Poole	On Point Motorsports	Toyota
27	56	Tyler Hill	Hill Motorsports	Chevrolet
28	20	Spencer Boyd	Young's Motorsports	Chevrolet
29	02	Tate Fogleman	Young's Motorsports	Chevrolet
30	00	Angela Ruch	Reaume Brothers Racing	Toyota
31	22	Austin Wayne Self	AM Racing	Chevrolet
32	11	Spencer Davis	Spencer Davis Motorsports	Toyota
33	68	Clay Greenfield	Clay Greenfield Motorsports	Toyota
34	10	Jennifer Jo Cobb	Jennifer Jo Cobb Racing	Chevrolet
35	49	Ray Ciccarelli	CMI Motorsports	Chevrolet
36	6	Norm Benning	Norm Benning Racing	Chevrolet
37	55	Dawson Cram	Long Motorsports	Chevrolet
38	34	Bryant Barnhill	Reaume Brothers Racing	Chevrolet
Failed to qualify
WD	03	Tim Viens	Mike Affarano Motorsports	Chevrolet
WD	83	Ray Ciccarelli	CMI Motorsports	Chevrolet
Official starting lineup

== Race results ==
Stage 1 Laps: 40

Fin	#	Driver	Team	Make	Pts
1	44	Ross Chastain	Niece Motorsports	Chevrolet	0
2	99	Ben Rhodes	ThorSport Racing	Ford	9
3	16	Austin Hill	Hattori Racing Enterprises	Toyota	8
4	98	Grant Enfinger	ThorSport Racing	Ford	7
5	88	Matt Crafton	ThorSport Racing	Ford	6
6	38	Todd Gilliland	Front Row Motorsports	Ford	5
7	18	Christian Eckes	Kyle Busch Motorsports	Toyota	4
8	4	Raphaël Lessard	Kyle Busch Motorsports	Toyota	3
9	52	Stewart Friesen	Halmar Friesen Racing	Toyota	2
10	2	Sheldon Creed	GMS Racing	Chevrolet	1

Stage 2 Laps: 40

Fin	#	Driver	Team	Make	Pts
1	51	Kyle Busch	Kyle Busch Motorsports	Toyota	0
2	44	Ross Chastain	Niece Motorsports	Chevrolet	0
3	16	Austin Hill	Hattori Racing Enterprises	Toyota	8
4	18	Christian Eckes	Kyle Busch Motorsports	Toyota	7
5	38	Todd Gilliland	Front Row Motorsports	Ford	6
6	99	Ben Rhodes	ThorSport Racing	Ford	5
7	24	Chase Elliott	GMS Racing	Chevrolet	0
8	19	Derek Kraus	McAnally–Hilgemann Racing	Toyota	3
9	98	Grant Enfinger	ThorSport Racing	Ford	2
10	4	Raphaël Lessard	Kyle Busch Motorsports	Toyota	1

Stage 3 Laps: 54

Fin	St	#	Driver	Team	Make	Laps	Led	Status	Pts
1	2	51	Kyle Busch	Kyle Busch Motorsports	Toyota	134	82	running	0
2	11	26	Tyler Ankrum	GMS Racing	Chevrolet	134	0	running	35
3	15	44	Ross Chastain	Niece Motorsports	Chevrolet	134	2	running	0
4	16	24	Chase Elliott	GMS Racing	Chevrolet	134	3	running	0
5	10	13	Johnny Sauter	ThorSport Racing	Ford	134	0	running	32
6	18	38	Todd Gilliland	Front Row Motorsports	Ford	134	0	running	42
7	1	16	Austin Hill	Hattori Racing Enterprises	Toyota	134	29	running	46
8	4	18	Christian Eckes	Kyle Busch Motorsports	Toyota	134	17	running	40
9	13	88	Matt Crafton	ThorSport Racing	Ford	134	1	running	34
10	21	45	Ty Majeski	Niece Motorsports	Chevrolet	134	0	running	27
11	14	4	Raphaël Lessard	Kyle Busch Motorsports	Toyota	134	0	running	30
12	20	15	Tanner Gray	DGR-Crosley	Ford	134	0	running	25
13	32	11	Spencer Davis	Spencer Davis Motorsports	Toyota	134	0	running	24
14	19	52	Stewart Friesen	Halmar Friesen Racing	Toyota	134	0	running	25
15	7	19	Derek Kraus	McAnally–Hilgemann Racing	Toyota	134	0	running	25
16	31	22	Austin Wayne Self	AM Racing	Chevrolet	134	0	running	21
17	3	98	Grant Enfinger	ThorSport Racing	Ford	134	0	running	29
18	5	99	Ben Rhodes	ThorSport Racing	Ford	134	0	running	33
19	26	30	Brennan Poole	On Point Motorsports	Toyota	134	0	running	0
20	8	2	Sheldon Creed	GMS Racing	Chevrolet	134	0	running	18
21	24	04	Cory Roper	Roper Racing	Ford	134	0	running	16
22	28	20	Spencer Boyd	Young's Motorsports	Chevrolet	134	0	running	15
23	29	02	Tate Fogleman	Young's Motorsports	Chevrolet	134	0	running	14
24	30	00	Angela Ruch	Reaume Brothers Racing	Toyota	134	0	running	13
25	27	56	Tyler Hill	Hill Motorsports	Chevrolet	133	0	running	12
26	22	33	Gray Gaulding	Reaume Brothers Racing	Toyota	133	0	running	11
27	34	10	Jennifer Jo Cobb	Jennifer Jo Cobb Racing	Chevrolet	132	0	running	10
28	12	9	Codie Rohrbaugh	CR7 Motorsports	Chevrolet	132	0	running	9
29	35	49	Ray Ciccarelli	CMI Motorsports	Chevrolet	131	0	running	8
30	33	68	Clay Greenfield	Clay Greenfield Motorsports	Toyota	122	0	running	7
31	25	3	Jordan Anderson	Jordan Anderson Racing	Chevrolet	120	0	crash	6
32	37	55	Dawson Cram	Long Motorsports	Chevrolet	111	0	transmission	5
33	23	7	Korbin Forrister	All Out Motorsports	Toyota	95	0	crash	5
34	36	6	Norm Benning	Norm Benning Racing	Chevrolet	89	0	handling	5
35	17	40	T. J. Bell	Niece Motorsports	Chevrolet	70	0	crash	5
36	9	23	Brett Moffitt	GMS Racing	Chevrolet	20	0	crash	5
37	6	21	Zane Smith	GMS Racing	Chevrolet	19	0	crash	5
38	38	34	Bryant Barnhill	Reaume Brothers Racing	Chevrolet	1	0	transmission	5
Official race results

Previous race: 2020 Vet Tix/Camping World 200	NASCAR Gander RV & Outdoors Truck Series; 2020 season	Next race: 2020 Pocono Organics 150
