= 2020 North Carolina Education Lottery 200 =

Race details
- Race 3 of 23 in the 2020 NASCAR Gander RV & Outdoors Truck Series season
- Date: May 26, 2020
- Location: Charlotte Motor Speedway in Concord, North Carolina
- Course: Permanent racing facility
- Course length: 1.5 miles (2.4 km)
- Distance: 134 laps, 201 mi (323.4 km)

Pole position
Driver	Ben Rhodes	ThorSport Racing
- Time: N/A

Most laps led
Driver	Chase Elliott	GMS Racing
- Laps: 47

Winner
No. 24	Chase Elliott	GMS Racing

Television in the United States
- Network: FS1

Radio in the United States
- Radio: MRN

The 2020 North Carolina Education Lottery 200 was a NASCAR Gander RV & Outdoors Truck Series race held on May 26, 2020, at Charlotte Motor Speedway in Concord, North Carolina. Contested over 134 laps on the 1.5-mile (2.4 km) asphalt speedway, it was the third race of the 2020 NASCAR Gander RV & Outdoors Truck Series season. For the first time since February, this was the first truck race to resume the season after a two-month hold due to the COVID-19 pandemic. Chase Elliott, driving for GMS Racing, won the race, his first truck win since 2017. Elliott had also won the $100K bounty, that was declared by Kevin Harvick, to any full-time Cup Series drivers that can beat Kyle Busch in a truck race. John Hunter Nemechek, Garrett Smithley, and Timmy Hill also competed for the bounty. Erik Jones was scheduled to also compete for it, but due to having no owner points for his team, Wauters Motorsports, he failed to qualify for the race.

== Entry list ==
No.	Driver	Team	Manufacturer
00	Angela Ruch	Reaume Brothers Racing	Toyota
02	Tate Fogleman (R)	Young's Motorsports	Chevrolet
2	Sheldon Creed	GMS Racing	Chevrolet
03	Tim Viens	Mike Affarano Motorsports	Chevrolet
3	Jordan Anderson	Jordan Anderson Racing	Chevrolet
04	Cory Roper	Roper Racing	Ford
4	Raphaël Lessard (R)	Kyle Busch Motorsports	Toyota
5	Erik Jones (i)	Wauters Motorsports	Toyota
6	Norm Benning	Norm Benning Racing	Chevrolet
7	Korbin Forrister	All Out Motorsports	Toyota
8	John Hunter Nemechek (i)	NEMCO Motorsports	Ford
9	Codie Rohrbaugh	CR7 Motorsports	Chevrolet
10	Jennifer Jo Cobb	Jennifer Jo Cobb Racing	Chevrolet
11	Spencer Davis (R)	Spencer Davis Motorsports	Toyota
13	Johnny Sauter	ThorSport Racing	Ford
14	Trey Hutchens	Trey Hutchens Racing	Chevrolet
15	Tanner Gray (R)	DGR-Crosley	Ford
16	Austin Hill	Hattori Racing Enterprises	Toyota
18	Christian Eckes (R)	Kyle Busch Motorsports	Toyota
19	Derek Kraus (R)	McAnally-Hilgemann Racing	Toyota
20	Spencer Boyd	Young's Motorsports	Chevrolet
21	Zane Smith (R)	GMS Racing	Chevrolet
22	Austin Wayne Self	AM Racing	Chevrolet
23	Brett Moffitt	GMS Racing	Chevrolet
24	Chase Elliott (i)	GMS Racing	Chevrolet
26	Tyler Ankrum	GMS Racing	Chevrolet
28	Bryan Dauzat	FDNY Racing	Chevrolet
30	Brennan Poole (i)	On Point Motorsports	Toyota
33	Jesse Iwuji	Reaume Brothers Racing	Chevrolet
34	Bryant Barnhill	Reaume Brothers Racing	Toyota
38	Todd Gilliland	Front Row Motorsports	Ford
40	Garrett Smithley (i)	Niece Motorsports	Chevrolet
42	Ross Chastain (i)	Niece Motorsports	Chevrolet
44	Natalie Decker	Niece Motorsports	Chevrolet
45	Ty Majeski (R)	Niece Motorsports	Chevrolet
49	Bayley Currey	CMI Motorsports	Chevrolet
51	Kyle Busch (i)	Kyle Busch Motorsports	Toyota
52	Stewart Friesen	Halmar Friesen Racing	Toyota
55	Dawson Cram	Long Motorsports	Chevrolet
56	Timmy Hill	Hill Motorsports	Chevrolet
68	Clay Greenfield	Clay Greenfield Motorsports	Toyota
75	Parker Kligerman	Henderson Motorsports	Chevrolet
83	T. J. Bell	CMI Motorsports	Chevrolet
88	Matt Crafton	ThorSport Racing	Ford
97	Jesse Little (i)	Diversified Motorsports Enterprises	Chevrolet
98	Grant Enfinger	ThorSport Racing	Ford
99	Ben Rhodes	ThorSport Racing	Ford

== Qualifying ==
Due to the pandemic, there would be no practice or qualifying, starting lineup would be determined by owner points.

=== Qualifying results ===
Pos	No	Driver	Team	Manufacturer	Time
1	99	Ben Rhodes	ThorSport Racing	Ford	
2	26	Tyler Ankrum	GMS Racing	Chevrolet	
3	15	Tanner Gray (R)	DGR-Crosley	Ford	
4	88	Matt Crafton	ThorSport Racing	Ford	
5	16	Austin Hill	Hattori Racing Enterprises	Toyota	
6	18	Christian Eckes (R)	Kyle Busch Motorsports	Toyota	
7	45	Ty Majeski (R)	Niece Motorsports	Chevrolet	
8	13	Johnny Sauter	ThorSport Racing	Ford	
9	98	Grant Enfinger	ThorSport Racing	Ford	
10	52	Stewart Friesen	Halmar Friesen Racing	Toyota	
11	38	Todd Gilliland	Front Row Motorsports	Ford	
12	00	Angela Ruch	Reaume Brothers Racing	Toyota	
13	44	Natalie Decker	Niece Motorsports	Chevrolet	
14	33	Jesse Iwuji	Reaume Brothers Racing	Chevrolet	
15	22	Austin Wayne Self	AM Racing	Chevrolet	
16	51	Kyle Busch (i)	Kyle Busch Motorsports	Toyota	
17	02	Tate Fogleman (R)	Young's Motorsports	Chevrolet	
18	3	Jordan Anderson	Jordan Anderson Racing	Chevrolet	
19	20	Spencer Boyd	Young's Motorsports	Chevrolet	
20	4	Raphaël Lessard (R)	Kyle Busch Motorsports	Toyota	
21	2	Sheldon Creed	GMS Racing	Chevrolet	
22	23	Brett Moffitt	GMS Racing	Chevrolet	
23	04	Cory Roper	Roper Racing	Ford	
24	40	Garrett Smithley (i)	Niece Motorsports	Chevrolet	
25	19	Derek Kraus (R)	McAnally-Hilgemann Racing	Toyota	
26	24	Chase Elliott (i)	GMS Racing	Chevrolet	
27	42	Ross Chastain (i)	Niece Motorsports	Chevrolet	
28	11	Spencer Davis (R)	Spencer Davis Motorsports	Toyota	
29	10	Jennifer Jo Cobb	Jennifer Jo Cobb Racing	Chevrolet	
30	21	Zane Smith (R)	GMS Racing	Chevrolet	
31	9	Codie Rohrbaugh	CR7 Motorsports	Chevrolet	
32	30	Brennan Poole (i)	On Point Motorsports	Toyota	
33	56	Timmy Hill	Hill Motorsports	Chevrolet	
34	7	Korbin Forrister	All Out Motorsports	Toyota	
35	97	Jesse Little (i)	Diversified Motorsports Enterprises	Chevrolet	
36	28	Bryan Dauzat	FDNY Racing	Chevrolet	
37	83	T. J. Bell	CMI Motorsports	Chevrolet	
38	8	John Hunter Nemechek (i)	NEMCO Motorsports	Ford	
39	68	Clay Greenfield	Clay Greenfield Motorsports	Toyota	
40	49	Bayley Currey	CMI Motorsports	Chevrolet	
Failed to qualify
41	6	Norm Benning	Norm Benning Racing	Chevrolet	
42	75	Parker Kligerman	Henderson Motorsports	Chevrolet	
43	14	Trey Hutchens	Trey Hutchens Racing	Chevrolet	
44	03	Tim Viens	Mike Affarano Motorsports	Chevrolet	
45	5	Erik Jones (i)	Wauters Motorsports	Toyota	
46	34	Bryant Barnhill	Reaume Brothers Racing	Toyota	
47	55	Dawson Cram	Long Motorsports	Chevrolet	

== Race ==
=== Stage Results ===
Stage One Laps: 37

Pos	No	Driver	Team	Manufacturer	Points
1	42	Ross Chastain (i)	Niece Motorsports	Chevrolet	0
2	16	Austin Hill	Hattori Racing Enterprises	Toyota	9
3	21	Zane Smith (R)	GMS Racing	Chevrolet	8
4	88	Matt Crafton	ThorSport Racing	Ford	7
5	45	Ty Majeski (R)	Niece Motorsports	Chevrolet	6
6	24	Chase Elliott (i)	GMS Racing	Chevrolet	0
7	38	Todd Gilliland	Front Row Motorsports	Ford	4
8	99	Ben Rhodes	ThorSport Racing	Ford	3
9	26	Tyler Ankrum	GMS Racing	Chevrolet	2
10	23	Brett Moffitt	GMS Racing	Chevrolet	1

Stage Two Laps: 30

Pos	No	Driver	Team	Manufacturer	Points
1	24	Chase Elliott (i)	GMS Racing	Chevrolet	0
2	99	Ben Rhodes	ThorSport Racing	Ford	9
3	8	John Hunter Nemechek (i)	NEMCO Motorsports	Ford	0
4	88	Matt Crafton	ThorSport Racing	Ford	7
5	51	Kyle Busch (i)	Kyle Busch Motorsports	Toyota	0
6	23	Brett Moffitt	GMS Racing	Chevrolet	5
7	21	Zane Smith (R)	GMS Racing	Chevrolet	4
8	38	Todd Gilliland	Front Row Motorsports	Ford	3
9	42	Ross Chastain (i)	Niece Motorsports	Chevrolet	0
10	16	Austin Hill	Hattori Racing Enterprises	Toyota	1

=== Final Stage Results ===
Stage Three Laps: 54

Pos	Grid	No	Driver	Team	Manufacturer	Laps	Points
1	26	24	Chase Elliott (i)	GMS Racing	Chevrolet	134	0
2	16	51	Kyle Busch (i)	Kyle Busch Motorsports	Toyota	134	0
3	20	21	Zane Smith (R)	GMS Racing	Chevrolet	134	46
4	22	23	Brett Moffitt	GMS Racing	Chevrolet	134	39
5	21	2	Sheldon Creed	GMS Racing	Chevrolet	134	32
6	38	8	John Hunter Nemechek (i)	NEMCO Motorsports	Ford	134	0
7	8	13	Johnny Sauter	ThorSport Racing	Ford	134	30
8	7	45	Ty Majeski (R)	Niece Motorsports	Chevrolet	134	35
9	5	16	Austin Hill	Hattori Racing Enterprises	Toyota	134	38
10	1	99	Ben Rhodes	ThorSport Racing	Ford	134	39
11	27	42	Ross Chastain (i)	Niece Motorsports	Chevrolet	134	0
12	9	98	Grant Enfinger	ThorSport Racing	Ford	134	25
13	2	26	Tyler Ankrum	GMS Racing	Chevrolet	134	26
14	6	18	Christian Eckes (R)	Kyle Busch Motorsports	Toyota	134	23
15	20	4	Raphaël Lessard (R)	Kyle Busch Motorsports	Toyota	134	22
16	25	19	Derek Kraus (R)	McAnally-Hilgemann Racing	Toyota	134	21
17	17	02	Tate Fogleman (R)	Young's Motorsports	Chevrolet	134	20
18	31	9	Codie Rohrbaugh	CR7 Motorsports	Chevrolet	134	19
19	15	22	Austin Wayne Self	AM Racing	Chevrolet	134	18
20	3	15	Tanner Gray (R)	DGR-Crosley	Ford	134	17
21	35	97	Jesse Little (i)	Diversified Motorsports Enterprises	Chevrolet	134	0
22	33	56	Timmy Hill	Hill Motorsports	Chevrolet	134	15
23	12	00	Angela Ruch	Reaume Brothers Racing	Toyota	133	14
24	34	7	Korbin Forrister	All Out Motorsports	Toyota	133	13
25	19	20	Spencer Boyd	Young's Motorsports	Chevrolet	133	12
26	29	10	Jennifer Jo Cobb	Jennifer Jo Cobb Racing	Chevrolet	133	11
27	13	44	Natalie Decker	Niece Motorsports	Chevrolet	132	10
28	40	49	Bayley Currey	CMI Motorsports	Chevrolet	132	0
29	39	68	Clay Greenfield	Clay Greenfield Motorsports	Toyota	130	8
30	10	52	Stewart Friesen	Halmar Friesen Racing	Toyota	130	7
31	18	3	Jordan Anderson	Jordan Anderson Racing	Chevrolet	130	6
32	23	04	Cory Roper	Roper Racing	Ford	129	5
33	37	83	T. J. Bell	CMI Motorsports	Chevrolet	127	5
34	36	28	Bryan Dauzat	FDNY Racing	Chevrolet	120	5
35	4	88	Matt Crafton	ThorSport Racing	Ford	107	19
36	24	40	Garrett Smithley (i)	Niece Motorsports	Chevrolet	105	0
37	11	38	Todd Gilliland	Front Row Motorsports	Ford	102	12
38	32	30	Brennan Poole (i)	On Point Motorsports	Toyota	83	0
39	14	33	Jesse Iwuji	Reaume Brothers Racing	Chevrolet	74	5
40	28	11	Spencer Davis (R)	Spencer Davis Motorsports	Toyota	54	5

Previous race: 2020 Strat 200	NASCAR Gander RV & Outdoors Truck Series; 2020 season	Next race: 2020 Vet Tix/Camping World 200
