= 2018 Eaton 200 =

2018 Villa Lighting Delivers the Eaton 200
Race details
- Race 10 of 23 of the 2018 NASCAR Camping World Truck Series
- Date: June 23, 2018
- Official name: Villa Lighting Delivers the Eaton 200
- Location: Madison, Illinois, Gateway Motorsports Park
- Course: Permanent racing facility
- Course length: 1.25 miles (2.01 km)
- Distance: 160 laps, 200 mi (321.868 km)
- Scheduled distance: 160 laps, 200 mi (321.868 km)
- Average speed: 85.328 miles per hour (137.322 km/h)

Pole position
Driver	Grant Enfinger	ThorSport Racing
- Time: 32.405

Most laps led
Driver	Noah Gragson	Kyle Busch Motorsports
- Laps: 63

Winner
No. 24	Justin Haley	GMS Racing

Television in the United States
- Network: Fox Sports 1
- Announcers: Vince Welch, Phil Parsons, Todd Bodine

Radio in the United States
- Radio: Motor Racing Network

The 2018 Villa Lighting Delivers the Eaton 200 was the tenth stock car race of the 2018 NASCAR Camping World Truck Series season and the 18th iteration of the event. The race was held on Saturday, June 23, 2018 in Madison, Illinois at Gateway Motorsports Park, a 1.25 miles (2.01 km) permanent oval-shaped racetrack. The race took the scheduled 160 laps to complete. At race's end, after a chaotic final restart with three to go, Justin Haley of GMS Racing would win his first ever NASCAR Camping World Truck Series career win and of the season. To fill out the podium, Todd Gilliland of Kyle Busch Motorsports and Johnny Sauter of GMS Racing would finish 2nd and 3rd, respectively.

The race was the NASCAR Camping World Truck Series debuts for Bryant Barnhill, Riley Herbst, Zane Smith, and Tate Fogleman.

== Background ==
Known as Gateway Motorsports Park until its renaming in April 2019, World Wide Technology Raceway is a 1.25-mile (2.01 km) paved oval motor racing track in Madison, Illinois, United States. The track previously held Truck races from 1998 to 2010, and returned starting in 2014.

=== Entry list ===
#	Driver	Team	Make	Sponsor
0	Camden Murphy	Jennifer Jo Cobb Racing	Chevrolet	Jennifer Jo Cobb Racing
2	Cody Coughlin	GMS Racing	Chevrolet	Jegs
02	Austin Hill	Young's Motorsports	Chevrolet	ARCO National Construction
3	Jordan Anderson	Jordan Anderson Racing	Chevrolet	Bommarito Automotive Group
4	Todd Gilliland	Kyle Busch Motorsports	Toyota	Royal Canin
6	Norm Benning	Norm Benning Racing	Chevrolet	Zomongo
8	John Hunter Nemechek	NEMCO Motorsports	Chevrolet	Toenjes Brick Contracting
10	Jennifer Jo Cobb	Jennifer Jo Cobb Racing	Chevrolet	Driven2Honor.org
13	Myatt Snider	ThorSport Racing	Ford	The Carolina Nut Co.
15	Bryant Barnhill	Premium Motorsports	Chevrolet	WCIParts.com
16	Brett Moffitt	Hattori Racing Enterprises	Toyota	Aisin
18	Noah Gragson	Kyle Busch Motorsports	Toyota	Safelite Auto Glass
20	Tate Fogleman	Young's Motorsports	Chevrolet	Overkill Motorsports
21	Johnny Sauter	GMS Racing	Chevrolet	ISM Connect Patriotic
22	Austin Wayne Self	Niece Motorsports	Chevrolet	AM Technical Solutions, GO TEXAN.
24	Justin Haley	GMS Racing	Chevrolet	Fraternal Order of Eagles Patriotic
25	Dalton Sargeant	GMS Racing	Chevrolet	Performance Plus Motor Oil
33	Josh Reaume	Reaume Brothers Racing	Chevrolet	Colonial Countertops
41	Ben Rhodes	ThorSport Racing	Ford	Alpha Energy Solutions
42	Chad Finley	Chad Finley Racing	Chevrolet	Strutmasters, Auto Value
45	Justin Fontaine	Niece Motorsports	Chevrolet	ProMatic Automation
46	Christian Eckes	Kyle Busch Motorsports	Toyota	Mobil 1
49	Wendell Chavous	Premium Motorsports	Chevrolet	SobrietyNation.org
50	Ross Chastain	Beaver Motorsports	Chevrolet	VIPRacingExperience.com
51	Riley Herbst	Kyle Busch Motorsports	Toyota	Advance Auto Parts
52	Stewart Friesen	Halmar Friesen Racing	Chevrolet	Halmar "We Build America"
54	Zane Smith	DGR-Crosley	Toyota	Crosley Brands, La Paz Margarita Mix
63	Kevin Donahue	MB Motorsports	Chevrolet	Centurion Coin, First Responder Racing
74	B. J. McLeod	Mike Harmon Racing	Chevrolet	Troptions
83	Tyler Matthews	MB Motorsports	Chevrolet	First Responder Racing
87	Joe Nemechek	NEMCO Motorsports	Chevrolet	Fleetwing, D. A. B. Constructors, Inc.
88	Matt Crafton	ThorSport Racing	Ford	Menards, Ideal Door Garage Doors
97	Jesse Little	JJL Motorsports	Ford	JJL Motorsports, Rustic Rub Co.
98	Grant Enfinger	ThorSport Racing	Ford	Champion Power Equipment "Powering Your Life."
Official entry list

== Practice ==
=== First practice ===
The first practice would occur on Friday, June 22, at 4:45 PM CST. Christian Eckes would set the fastest time with a 33.492 and an average speed of 134.360 miles per hour (216.231 km/h).

Pos.	#	Driver	Team	Make	Time	Speed
1	46	Christian Eckes	Kyle Busch Motorsports	Toyota	33.492	134.360
2	18	Noah Gragson	Kyle Busch Motorsports	Toyota	33.501	134.324
3	41	Ben Rhodes	ThorSport Racing	Ford	33.552	134.120
Full first practice results

=== Second practice ===
The second practice would occur on Friday, June 22, at 6:35 PM CST. Brett Moffitt of Hattori Racing Enterprises would set the fastest time with a 32.801 and an average speed of 137.191 miles per hour (220.788 km/h).

Pos.	#	Driver	Team	Make	Time	Speed
1	16	Brett Moffitt	Hattori Racing Enterprises	Toyota	32.801	137.191
2	13	Myatt Snider	ThorSport Racing	Ford	32.929	136.658
3	21	Johnny Sauter	GMS Racing	Chevrolet	32.941	136.608
Full second practice results

=== Third and final practice ===
The third and final practice took place on Saturday, June 23, at 11:00 AM CST. Todd Gilliland of Kyle Busch Motorsports would set the fastest time with a 32.304 and an average speed of 139.302 miles per hour (224.185 km/h).

Pos.	#	Driver	Team	Make	Time	Speed
1	4	Todd Gilliland	Kyle Busch Motorsports	Toyota	32.304	139.302
2	88	Matt Crafton	ThorSport Racing	Ford	32.328	139.198
3	18	Noah Gragson	Kyle Busch Motorsports	Toyota	32.399	138.893
Full final practice results

== Qualifying ==
Qualifying would take place on Saturday, June 23, at 4:45 PM CST. Since Gateway Motorsports Park is under 1.5 miles (2.4 km), the qualifying system was a multi-car system that included three rounds. The first round was 15 minutes, where every driver would be able to set a lap within the 15 minutes. Then, the second round would consist of the fastest 24 cars in Round 1, and drivers would have 10 minutes to set a lap. Round 3 consisted of the fastest 12 drivers from Round 2, and the drivers would have 5 minutes to set a time. Whoever was fastest in Round 3 would win the pole.

Grant Enfinger would make it through the preliminary two rounds and set the fastest time in Round 3 with a 32.405 and an average speed of 138.867 miles per hour (223.485 km/h), making Enfinger win the pole. Meanwhile, the #74 of B. J. McLeod and the #0 of Camden Murphy would fail to qualify.

Pos.	#	Driver	Team	Make	Time (R1)	Speed (R1)	Time (R2)	Speed (R2)	Time (R3)	Speed (R3)
1	98	Grant Enfinger	ThorSport Racing	Ford					32.405	138.867
2	46	Christian Eckes	Kyle Busch Motorsports	Toyota					32.469	138.594
3	18	Noah Gragson	Kyle Busch Motorsports	Toyota					32.514	138.402
4	24	Justin Haley	GMS Racing	Chevrolet					32.532	138.325
5	41	Ben Rhodes	ThorSport Racing	Ford					32.559	138.211
6	88	Matt Crafton	ThorSport Racing	Ford					32.562	138.198
7	8	John Hunter Nemechek	NEMCO Motorsports	Chevrolet					32.579	138.126
8	4	Todd Gilliland	Kyle Busch Motorsports	Toyota					32.587	138.092
9	97	Jesse Little	JJL Motorsports	Ford					32.730	137.489
10	54	Zane Smith	DGR-Crosley	Toyota					32.752	137.396
11	16	Brett Moffitt	Hattori Racing Enterprises	Toyota					32.843	137.015
12	2	Cody Coughlin	GMS Racing	Chevrolet					32.882	136.853
Eliminated in Round 2
13	21	Johnny Sauter	GMS Racing	Chevrolet			32.761	137.358	—	—
14	13	Myatt Snider	ThorSport Racing	Ford			32.874	136.886	—	—
15	20	Tate Fogleman	Young's Motorsports	Chevrolet			32.945	136.591	—	—
16	52	Stewart Friesen	Halmar Friesen Racing	Chevrolet			32.963	136.517	—	—
17	51	Riley Herbst	Kyle Busch Motorsports	Toyota			33.067	136.087	—	—
18	25	Dalton Sargeant	GMS Racing	Chevrolet			33.097	135.964	—	—
19	02	Austin Hill	Young's Motorsports	Chevrolet			33.097	135.964	—	—
20	42	Chad Finley	Chad Finley Racing	Chevrolet			33.449	134.533	—	—
21	45	Justin Fontaine	Niece Motorsports	Chevrolet			33.556	134.104	—	—
22	49	Wendell Chavous	Premium Motorsports	Chevrolet			33.603	133.917	—	—
23	50	Ross Chastain	Beaver Motorsports	Chevrolet	33.290	135.176	—	—	—	—
24	63	Kevin Donahue	MB Motorsports	Chevrolet	33.767	133.266	—	—	—	—
Eliminated in Round 1
25	22	Austin Wayne Self	Niece Motorsports	Chevrolet	33.769	133.258	—	—	—	—
26	3	Jordan Anderson	Jordan Anderson Racing	Chevrolet	33.862	132.892	—	—	—	—
27	87	Joe Nemechek	NEMCO Motorsports	Chevrolet	33.982	132.423	—	—	—	—
Qualified by owner's points
28	15	Bryant Barnhill	Premium Motorsports	Chevrolet	34.641	129.904	—	—	—	—
29	10	Jennifer Jo Cobb	Jennifer Jo Cobb Racing	Chevrolet	34.663	129.821	—	—	—	—
30	83	Tyler Matthews	MB Motorsports	Chevrolet	36.041	124.858	—	—	—	—
31	6	Norm Benning	Norm Benning Racing	Chevrolet	36.128	124.557	—	—	—	—
32	33	Josh Reaume	Reaume Brothers Racing	Chevrolet	—	—	—	—	—	—
Failed to qualify
33	74	B. J. McLeod	Mike Harmon Racing	Chevrolet	34.270	131.310	—	—	—	—
34	0	Camden Murphy	Jennifer Jo Cobb Racing	Chevrolet	34.480	130.510	—	—	—	—
Official starting lineup

== Race results ==
Stage 1 Laps: 35

Fin	#	Driver	Team	Make	Pts
1	98	Grant Enfinger	ThorSport Racing	Ford	10
2	18	Noah Gragson	Kyle Busch Motorsports	Toyota	9
3	88	Matt Crafton	ThorSport Racing	Ford	8
4	8	John Hunter Nemechek	NEMCO Motorsports	Chevrolet	0
5	24	Justin Haley	GMS Racing	Chevrolet	6
6	16	Brett Moffitt	Hattori Racing Enterprises	Toyota	5
7	46	Christian Eckes	Kyle Busch Motorsports	Toyota	4
8	97	Jesse Little	JJL Motorsports	Ford	3
9	21	Johnny Sauter	GMS Racing	Chevrolet	2
10	52	Stewart Friesen	Halmar Friesen Racing	Chevrolet	1

Stage 2 Laps: 35

Fin	#	Driver	Team	Make	Pts
1	46	Christian Eckes	Kyle Busch Motorsports	Toyota	10
2	21	Johnny Sauter	GMS Racing	Chevrolet	9
3	4	Todd Gilliland	Kyle Busch Motorsports	Toyota	8
4	18	Noah Gragson	Kyle Busch Motorsports	Toyota	7
5	16	Brett Moffitt	Hattori Racing Enterprises	Toyota	6
6	8	John Hunter Nemechek	NEMCO Motorsports	Chevrolet	0
7	97	Jesse Little	JJL Motorsports	Ford	4
8	98	Grant Enfinger	ThorSport Racing	Ford	3
9	52	Stewart Friesen	Halmar Friesen Racing	Chevrolet	2
10	24	Justin Haley	GMS Racing	Chevrolet	1

Stage 3 Laps: 90

Fin	St	#	Driver	Team	Make	Laps	Led	Status	Pts
1	4	24	Justin Haley	GMS Racing	Chevrolet	160	7	running	47
2	8	4	Todd Gilliland	Kyle Busch Motorsports	Toyota	160	1	running	43
3	13	21	Johnny Sauter	GMS Racing	Chevrolet	160	0	running	45
4	14	13	Myatt Snider	ThorSport Racing	Ford	160	0	running	33
5	10	54	Zane Smith	DGR-Crosley	Toyota	160	0	running	32
6	20	42	Chad Finley	Chad Finley Racing	Chevrolet	160	0	running	31
7	9	97	Jesse Little	JJL Motorsports	Ford	160	0	running	37
8	17	51	Riley Herbst	Kyle Busch Motorsports	Toyota	160	0	running	29
9	12	2	Cody Coughlin	GMS Racing	Chevrolet	160	0	running	28
10	3	18	Noah Gragson	Kyle Busch Motorsports	Toyota	160	63	running	43
11	19	02	Austin Hill	Young's Motorsports	Chevrolet	160	0	running	26
12	24	63	Kevin Donahue	MB Motorsports	Chevrolet	160	0	running	25
13	16	52	Stewart Friesen	Halmar Friesen Racing	Chevrolet	160	0	running	27
14	11	16	Brett Moffitt	Hattori Racing Enterprises	Toyota	160	18	running	34
15	22	49	Wendell Chavous	Premium Motorsports	Chevrolet	160	0	running	22
16	25	22	Austin Wayne Self	Niece Motorsports	Chevrolet	160	0	running	21
17	30	83	Tyler Matthews	MB Motorsports	Chevrolet	160	0	running	20
18	32	33	Josh Reaume	Reaume Brothers Racing	Chevrolet	159	0	running	19
19	5	41	Ben Rhodes	ThorSport Racing	Ford	157	0	running	18
20	6	88	Matt Crafton	ThorSport Racing	Ford	156	0	running	25
21	1	98	Grant Enfinger	ThorSport Racing	Ford	153	36	running	29
22	29	10	Jennifer Jo Cobb	Jennifer Jo Cobb Racing	Chevrolet	148	0	running	15
23	26	3	Jordan Anderson	Jordan Anderson Racing	Chevrolet	144	0	running	14
24	31	6	Norm Benning	Norm Benning Racing	Chevrolet	121	0	clutch	13
25	7	8	John Hunter Nemechek	NEMCO Motorsports	Chevrolet	113	1	oil leak	0
26	21	45	Justin Fontaine	Niece Motorsports	Chevrolet	113	0	crash	11
27	15	20	Tate Fogleman	Young's Motorsports	Chevrolet	113	0	crash	10
28	2	46	Christian Eckes	Kyle Busch Motorsports	Toyota	76	34	crash	23
29	23	50	Ross Chastain	Beaver Motorsports	Chevrolet	43	0	vibration	0
30	18	25	Dalton Sargeant	GMS Racing	Chevrolet	31	0	crash	7
31	28	15	Bryant Barnhill	Premium Motorsports	Chevrolet	5	0	engine	6
32	27	87	Joe Nemechek	NEMCO Motorsports	Chevrolet	0	0	electrical	5
Failed to qualify
33		74	B. J. McLeod	Mike Harmon Racing	Chevrolet				
34		0	Camden Murphy	Jennifer Jo Cobb Racing	Chevrolet				
Official race results

Previous race: 2018 M&M's 200	NASCAR Camping World Truck Series; 2018 season	Next race: 2018 Overton's 225
