= 2020 South Carolina Education Lottery 200 =

Race details
- Race 15 of 23 of the 2020 NASCAR Gander RV & Outdoors Truck Series
- Date: September 6, 2020
- Official name: South Carolina Education Lottery 200
- Location: Darlington, South Carolina, Darlington Raceway
- Course: Permanent racing facility
- Course length: 1.366 miles (2.198 km)
- Distance: 152 laps, 207.632 mi (334.096 km)
- Scheduled distance: 147 laps, 200.802 mi (323.159 km)
- Average speed: 109.536 miles per hour (176.281 km/h)

Pole position
Driver	Brett Moffitt	GMS Racing
- Grid positions set by competition-based formula

Most laps led
Driver	Sheldon Creed	GMS Racing
- Laps: 82

Winner
No. 99	Ben Rhodes	ThorSport Racing

Television in the United States
- Network: Fox Sports 1
- Announcers: Vince Welch, Michael Waltrip, and Regan Smith

Radio in the United States
- Radio: Motor Racing Network

The 2020 South Carolina Education Lottery 200 was the 15th stock car race of the 2020 NASCAR Gander RV & Outdoors Truck Series and the 7th iteration of the event, after the NASCAR Gander RV & Outdoors Truck Series returned to Darlington Raceway after 9 years of absence from the track. The race was held on Sunday, September 6, 2020 in Darlington, South Carolina at Darlington Raceway, a 1.366 miles (2.198 km) permanent egg-shaped racetrack. The race was extended from the scheduled 147 laps to 152 due to a NASCAR overtime attempt caused by a crash including Josh Reaume. At race's end, Ben Rhodes of ThorSport Racing would move up to the front due to strategy and hold off Derek Kraus to win, the 3rd win of his career in the NASCAR Gander RV & Outdoors Truck Series and the first and only win of the season. To fill out the podium, Derek Kraus of McAnally–Hilgemann Racing and Austin Hill of Hattori Racing Enterprises would finish 2nd and 3rd, respectively.

After a two-year absence from racing, Trevor Bayne would return for the race in the No. 40 for Niece Motorsports.

== Background ==
The layout of Darlington Raceway, the venue where the race was held.

Darlington Raceway is a race track built for NASCAR racing located near Darlington, South Carolina. It is nicknamed "The Lady in Black" and "The Track Too Tough to Tame" by many NASCAR fans and drivers and advertised as "A NASCAR Tradition." It is of a unique, somewhat egg-shaped design, an oval with the ends of very different configurations, a condition which supposedly arose from the proximity of one end of the track to a minnow pond the owner refused to relocate. This situation makes it very challenging for the crews to set up their cars' handling in a way that is effective at both ends.

=== Entry list ===
#	Driver	Team	Make	Throwback (if applicable)
00	Josh Reaume	Reaume Brothers Racing	Toyota	Rusty Wallace Miller Lite scheme
2	Sheldon Creed	GMS Racing	Chevrolet	Jimmie Johnson No. 888 Off-road truck
02	Tate Fogleman	Young's Motorsports	Chevrolet	
3	Jordan Anderson	Jordan Anderson Racing	Chevrolet	
4	Raphaël Lessard	Kyle Busch Motorsports	Toyota	
6	Norm Benning	Norm Benning Racing	Chevrolet	
9	Codie Rohrbaugh	CR7 Motorsports	Chevrolet	
10	Jennifer Jo Cobb	Jennifer Jo Cobb Racing	Chevrolet	
13	Johnny Sauter	ThorSport Racing	Ford	
15	Tanner Gray	DGR-Crosley	Ford	
16	Austin Hill	Hattori Racing Enterprises	Toyota	
17	David Ragan	DGR-Crosley	Ford	
18	Christian Eckes	Kyle Busch Motorsports	Toyota	Pre-1983 Safelite Truck scheme
19	Derek Kraus	McAnally–Hilgemann Racing	Toyota	1996 Ron Hornaday Jr. NAPA Auto Parts scheme
20	Spencer Boyd	Young's Motorsports	Chevrolet	2010 Todd Bodine scheme
21	Zane Smith	GMS Racing	Chevrolet	Wood Brothers Racing 1970's scheme
22	Austin Wayne Self	AM Racing	Chevrolet	
23	Brett Moffitt	GMS Racing	Chevrolet	Davey Allison Miller Lite scheme
24	Greg Biffle	GMS Racing	Chevrolet	2001 Ricky Hendrick scheme
26	Tyler Ankrum	GMS Racing	Chevrolet	1965 Junior Johnson scheme
30	Danny Bohn	On Point Motorsports	Toyota	
33	Bryant Barnhill	Reaume Brothers Racing	Chevrolet	Chad McCumbee ARCA Menards Series scheme
38	Todd Gilliland	Front Row Motorsports	Ford	
40	Trevor Bayne	Niece Motorsports	Chevrolet	Trevor Bayne returns to racing
41	Dawson Cram	Cram Racing Enterprises	Chevrolet	1952 Tim Flock scheme
44	Bayley Currey	Niece Motorsports	Chevrolet	1984 Cale Yarborough Hardee's scheme
45	Ty Majeski	Niece Motorsports	Chevrolet	Brewster Baker scheme
51	Chandler Smith	Kyle Busch Motorsports	Toyota	
52	Stewart Friesen	Halmar Friesen Racing	Chevrolet	Early 1970's Stan Friesen scheme
56	Timmy Hill	Hill Motorsports	Chevrolet	2003 Jerry Hill scheme
68	Clay Greenfield	Clay Greenfield Motorsports	Toyota	1993 Bobby Hamilton Country Time scheme
88	Matt Crafton	ThorSport Racing	Ford	2009 Matt Crafton scheme
98	Grant Enfinger	ThorSport Racing	Ford	
99	Ben Rhodes	ThorSport Racing	Ford	
Official entry list

== Starting lineup ==
The starting lineup wasselected based on the results and fastest lap of the last race, the 2020 CarShield 200 and owner's points. As a result, Brett Moffitt of GMS Racing would win the pole.

Pos.	#	Driver	Team	Make
1	23	Brett Moffitt	GMS Racing	Chevrolet
2	2	Sheldon Creed	GMS Racing	Chevrolet
3	16	Austin Hill	Hattori Racing Enterprises	Toyota
4	21	Zane Smith	GMS Racing	Chevrolet
5	99	Ben Rhodes	ThorSport Racing	Ford
6	4	Raphaël Lessard	Kyle Busch Motorsports	Toyota
7	98	Grant Enfinger	ThorSport Racing	Ford
8	52	Stewart Friesen	Halmar Friesen Racing	Chevrolet
9	26	Tyler Ankrum	GMS Racing	Chevrolet
10	88	Matt Crafton	ThorSport Racing	Ford
11	15	Tanner Gray	DGR-Crosley	Ford
12	45	Ty Majeski	Niece Motorsports	Chevrolet
13	19	Derek Kraus	McAnally–Hilgemann Racing	Toyota
14	51	Chandler Smith	Kyle Busch Motorsports	Toyota
15	38	Todd Gilliland	Front Row Motorsports	Ford
16	30	Danny Bohn	On Point Motorsports	Toyota
17	18	Christian Eckes	Kyle Busch Motorsports	Toyota
18	02	Tate Fogleman	Young's Motorsports	Chevrolet
19	3	Jordan Anderson	Jordan Anderson Racing	Chevrolet
20	24	Greg Biffle	GMS Racing	Chevrolet
21	56	Timmy Hill	Hill Motorsports	Chevrolet
22	68	Clay Greenfield	Clay Greenfield Motorsports	Toyota
23	13	Johnny Sauter	ThorSport Racing	Ford
24	22	Austin Wayne Self	AM Racing	Chevrolet
25	20	Spencer Boyd	Young's Motorsports	Chevrolet
26	40	Trevor Bayne	Niece Motorsports	Chevrolet
27	33	Bryant Barnhill	Reaume Brothers Racing	Chevrolet
28	41	Dawson Cram	Cram Racing Enterprises	Chevrolet
29	44	Bayley Currey	Niece Motorsports	Chevrolet
30	00	Josh Reaume	Reaume Brothers Racing	Toyota
31	10	Jennifer Jo Cobb	Jennifer Jo Cobb Racing	Chevrolet
32	6	Norm Benning	Norm Benning Racing	Chevrolet
33	9	Codie Rohrbaugh	CR7 Motorsports	Chevrolet
34	17	David Ragan	DGR-Crosley	Ford
Official starting lineup

== Race results ==
Stage 1 Laps: 45

Fin	#	Driver	Team	Make	Pts
1	23	Brett Moffitt	GMS Racing	Chevrolet	10
2	16	Austin Hill	Hattori Racing Enterprises	Toyota	9
3	2	Sheldon Creed	GMS Racing	Chevrolet	8
4	99	Ben Rhodes	ThorSport Racing	Ford	7
5	17	David Ragan	DGR-Crosley	Ford	0
6	88	Matt Crafton	ThorSport Racing	Ford	5
7	26	Tyler Ankrum	GMS Racing	Chevrolet	4
8	4	Raphaël Lessard	Kyle Busch Motorsports	Toyota	3
9	18	Christian Eckes	Kyle Busch Motorsports	Toyota	2
10	21	Zane Smith	GMS Racing	Chevrolet	1

Stage 2 Laps: 45

Fin	#	Driver	Team	Make	Pts
1	2	Sheldon Creed	GMS Racing	Chevrolet	10
2	23	Brett Moffitt	GMS Racing	Chevrolet	9
3	16	Austin Hill	Hattori Racing Enterprises	Toyota	8
4	99	Ben Rhodes	ThorSport Racing	Ford	7
5	17	David Ragan	DGR-Crosley	Ford	0
6	4	Raphaël Lessard	Kyle Busch Motorsports	Toyota	5
7	26	Tyler Ankrum	GMS Racing	Chevrolet	4
8	88	Matt Crafton	ThorSport Racing	Ford	3
9	38	Todd Gilliland	Front Row Motorsports	Ford	2
10	21	Zane Smith	GMS Racing	Chevrolet	1

Stage 3 Laps: 62

Fin	St	#	Driver	Team	Make	Laps	Led	Status	Pts
1	5	99	Ben Rhodes	ThorSport Racing	Ford	152	4	running	54
2	13	19	Derek Kraus	McAnally–Hilgemann Racing	Toyota	152	1	running	35
3	3	16	Austin Hill	Hattori Racing Enterprises	Toyota	152	0	running	51
4	7	98	Grant Enfinger	ThorSport Racing	Ford	152	0	running	33
5	17	18	Christian Eckes	Kyle Busch Motorsports	Toyota	152	0	running	34
6	6	4	Raphaël Lessard	Kyle Busch Motorsports	Toyota	152	0	running	39
7	15	38	Todd Gilliland	Front Row Motorsports	Ford	152	0	running	32
8	8	52	Stewart Friesen	Halmar Friesen Racing	Chevrolet	152	0	running	29
9	21	56	Timmy Hill	Hill Motorsports	Chevrolet	152	2	running	28
10	1	23	Brett Moffitt	GMS Racing	Chevrolet	152	63	running	46
11	9	26	Tyler Ankrum	GMS Racing	Chevrolet	152	0	running	34
12	29	44	Bayley Currey	Niece Motorsports	Chevrolet	152	0	running	25
13	12	45	Ty Majeski	Niece Motorsports	Chevrolet	152	0	running	24
14	10	88	Matt Crafton	ThorSport Racing	Ford	152	0	running	31
15	18	02	Tate Fogleman	Young's Motorsports	Chevrolet	152	0	running	22
16	4	21	Zane Smith	GMS Racing	Chevrolet	152	0	running	23
17	24	22	Austin Wayne Self	AM Racing	Chevrolet	152	0	running	20
18	2	2	Sheldon Creed	GMS Racing	Chevrolet	152	82	running	37
19	20	24	Greg Biffle	GMS Racing	Chevrolet	152	0	running	18
20	16	30	Danny Bohn	On Point Motorsports	Toyota	152	0	running	17
21	22	68	Clay Greenfield	Clay Greenfield Motorsports	Toyota	152	0	running	16
22	34	17	David Ragan	DGR-Crosley	Ford	152	0	running	0
23	14	51	Chandler Smith	Kyle Busch Motorsports	Toyota	151	0	running	14
24	19	3	Jordan Anderson	Jordan Anderson Racing	Chevrolet	151	0	running	13
25	33	9	Codie Rohrbaugh	CR7 Motorsports	Chevrolet	150	0	running	12
26	25	20	Spencer Boyd	Young's Motorsports	Chevrolet	150	0	running	11
27	26	40	Trevor Bayne	Niece Motorsports	Chevrolet	149	0	running	10
28	30	00	Josh Reaume	Reaume Brothers Racing	Toyota	149	0	running	9
29	11	15	Tanner Gray	DGR-Crosley	Ford	148	0	running	8
30	31	10	Jennifer Jo Cobb	Jennifer Jo Cobb Racing	Chevrolet	147	0	running	7
31	23	13	Johnny Sauter	ThorSport Racing	Ford	138	0	engine	6
32	32	6	Norm Benning	Norm Benning Racing	Chevrolet	52	0	handling	5
33	28	41	Dawson Cram	Cram Racing Enterprises	Chevrolet	51	0	crash	5
34	27	33	Bryant Barnhill	Reaume Brothers Racing	Chevrolet	4	0	crash	5
Official race results

Previous race: 2020 CarShield 200	NASCAR Gander RV & Outdoors Truck Series; 2020 season	Next race: 2020 ToyotaCare 250
