= 2019 Gander RV 150 =

Race details
- Race 14 of 23 in the 2019 NASCAR Gander Outdoors Truck Series season
- Date: July 27, 2019
- Location: Pocono Raceway in Long Pond, Pennsylvania
- Course: Permanent racing facility
- Course length: 4 km (2.5 miles)
- Distance: 60 laps, 150 mi (241 km)

Pole position
Driver	Austin Hill	Hattori Racing Enterprises
- Time: 52.525

Most laps led
Driver	Ross Chastain	Niece Motorsports
- Laps: 54

Winner
No. 45	Ross Chastain	Niece Motorsports

Television in the United States
- Network: FS1

Radio in the United States
- Radio: MRN

The 2019 Gander RV 150 is a NASCAR Gander Outdoors Truck Series race held on July 27, 2019, at Pocono Raceway in Long Pond, Pennsylvania. Contested over 60 laps on the 2.5-mile (4.0 km) superspeedway, it was the 14th race of the 2019 NASCAR Gander Outdoors Truck Series season.

== Background ==
=== Track ===
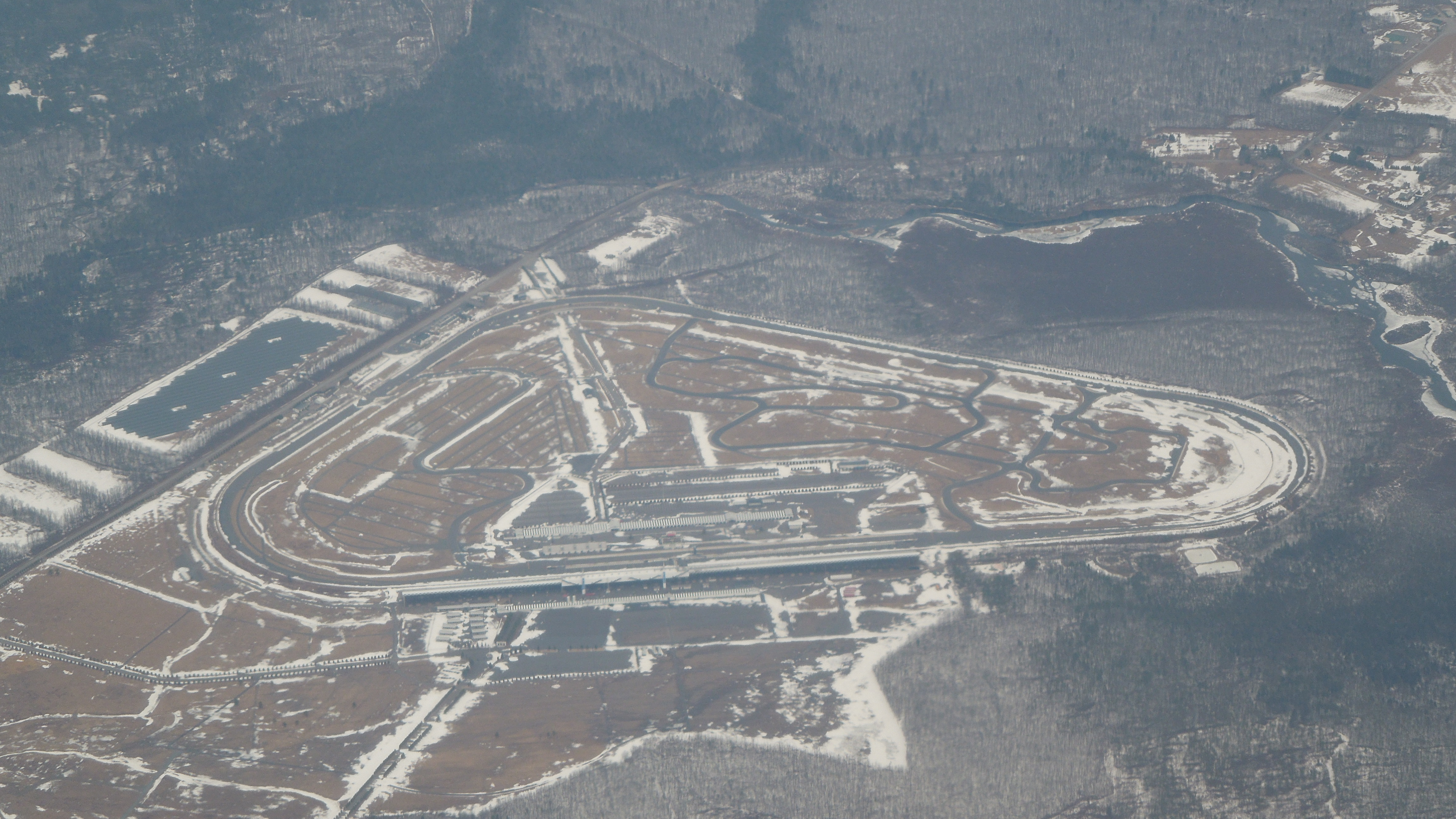
Pocono Raceway, the track where the race was held.

The race was held at Pocono Raceway, also known as The Tricky Triangle, which is a superspeedway located in the Pocono Mountains in Long Pond, Pennsylvania. It is the site of two annual Monster Energy NASCAR Cup Series races held several weeks apart in early June and late July, one NASCAR Xfinity Series event in early June, one NASCAR Gander Outdoors Truck Series event in late July, and two ARCA Racing Series events, one in early June and the other in late July. From 1971 to 1989, and since 2013, the track has also hosted an Indy Car race, currently sanctioned by the IndyCar Series and run in August.

== Entry list ==
No.	Driver	Team	Manufacturer
0	Daniel Sasnett	Jennifer Jo Cobb Racing	Chevrolet
02	Tyler Dippel (R)	Young's Motorsports	Chevrolet
2	Sheldon Creed (R)	GMS Racing	Chevrolet
3	Jordan Anderson	Jordan Anderson Racing	Chevrolet
4	Todd Gilliland	Kyle Busch Motorsports	Toyota
6	Norm Benning	Norm Benning Racing	Chevrolet
8	Tony Mrakovich	NEMCO Motorsports	Chevrolet
10	Jennifer Jo Cobb	Jennifer Jo Cobb Racing	Chevrolet
12	Gus Dean (R)	Young's Motorsports	Chevrolet
13	Johnny Sauter	ThorSport Racing	Ford
15	Anthony Alfredo (R)	DGR-Crosley	Toyota
16	Austin Hill	Hattori Racing Enterprises	Toyota
17	Tyler Ankrum (R)	DGR-Crosley	Toyota
18	Harrison Burton (R)	Kyle Busch Motorsports	Toyota
20	Spencer Boyd	Young's Motorsports	Chevrolet
22	Austin Wayne Self	AM Racing	Chevrolet
24	Brett Moffitt	GMS Racing	Chevrolet
28	Bryan Dauzat	FDNY Racing	Chevrolet
32	Bryant Barnhill	Reaume Brothers Racing	Chevrolet
33	Josh Reaume	Reaume Brothers Racing	Chevrolet
34	Mason Massey	Reaume Brothers Racing	Toyota
38	T. J. Bell	Niece Motorsports	Chevrolet
44	Bayley Currey	Niece Motorsports	Chevrolet
45	Ross Chastain	Niece Motorsports	Chevrolet
49	Ray Ciccarelli	CMI Motorsports	Chevrolet
51	Christian Eckes	Kyle Busch Motorsports	Toyota
52	Stewart Friesen	Halmar Friesen Racing	Chevrolet
54	Natalie Decker (R)	DGR-Crosley	Toyota
87	Joe Nemechek	NEMCO Motorsports	Chevrolet
88	Matt Crafton	ThorSport Racing	Ford
98	Grant Enfinger	ThorSport Racing	Ford
99	Ben Rhodes	ThorSport Racing	Ford

== Practice ==
=== First practice ===
Harrison Burton was the fastest in the first practice session with a time of 53.586 seconds and a speed of 167.954 mph (270.296 km/h).

Pos	No.	Driver	Team	Manufacturer	Time	Speed
1	18	Harrison Burton (R)	Kyle Busch Motorsports	Toyota	53.586	167.954
2	4	Todd Gilliland	Kyle Busch Motorsports	Toyota	53.833	167.184
3	24	Brett Moffitt	GMS Racing	Chevrolet	53.879	167.041

=== Final practice ===
Todd Gilliland was the fastest in the final practice session with a time of 53.383 seconds and a speed of 168.593 mph (271.324 km/h).

Pos	No.	Driver	Team	Manufacturer	Time	Speed
1	4	Todd Gilliland	Kyle Busch Motorsports	Toyota	53.383	168.593
2	2	Sheldon Creed (R)	GMS Racing	Chevrolet	53.514	168.180
3	16	Austin Hill	Hattori Racing Enterprises	Toyota	53.613	167.870

== Qualifying ==
Austin Hill scored the pole for the race with a time of 52.525 seconds and a speed of 171.347 mph (275.756 km/h).

=== Qualifying results ===
Pos	No	Driver	Team	Manufacturer	Time
1	16	Austin Hill	Hattori Racing Enterprises	Toyota	52.525
2	45	Ross Chastain	Niece Motorsports	Chevrolet	52.599
3	52	Stewart Friesen	Halmar Friesen Racing	Chevrolet	52.736
4	24	Brett Moffitt	GMS Racing	Chevrolet	52.917
5	2	Sheldon Creed (R)	GMS Racing	Chevrolet	52.920
6	18	Harrison Burton (R)	Kyle Busch Motorsports	Toyota	52.995
7	4	Todd Gilliland	Kyle Busch Motorsports	Toyota	53.177
8	88	Matt Crafton	ThorSport Racing	Ford	53.214
9	17	Tyler Ankrum (R)	DGR-Crosley	Toyota	53.216
10	98	Grant Enfinger	ThorSport Racing	Ford	53.240
11	44	Bayley Currey	Niece Motorsports	Chevrolet	53.240
12	3	Jordan Anderson	Jordan Anderson Racing	Chevrolet	53.375
13	51	Christian Eckes	Kyle Busch Motorsports	Toyota	53.436
14	15	Anthony Alfredo (R)	DGR-Crosley	Toyota	53.452
15	99	Ben Rhodes	ThorSport Racing	Ford	53.666
16	13	Johnny Sauter	ThorSport Racing	Ford	53.906
17	12	Gus Dean (R)	Young's Motorsports	Chevrolet	54.081
18	22	Austin Wayne Self	AM Racing	Chevrolet	54.266
19	87	Joe Nemechek	NEMCO Motorsports	Chevrolet	54.296
20	02	Tyler Dippel (R)	Young's Motorsports	Chevrolet	54.406
21	38	T. J. Bell	Niece Motorsports	Chevrolet	54.623
22	8	Tony Mrakovich	NEMCO Motorsports	Chevrolet	54.812
23	34	Mason Massey	Reaume Brothers Racing	Toyota	55.244
24	54	Natalie Decker (R)	DGR-Crosley	Toyota	55.287
25	20	Spencer Boyd	Young's Motorsports	Chevrolet	56.017
26	33	Josh Reaume	Reaume Brothers Racing	Chevrolet	56.279
27	49	Ray Ciccarelli	CMI Motorsports	Chevrolet	57.478
28	32	Bryant Barnhill	Reaume Brothers Racing	Chevrolet	57.907
29	6	Norm Benning	Norm Benning Racing	Chevrolet	58.511
30	28	Bryan Dauzat	FDNY Racing	Chevrolet	58.522
31	0	Daniel Sasnett	Jennifer Jo Cobb Racing	Chevrolet	58.832
32	10	Jennifer Jo Cobb	Jennifer Jo Cobb Racing	Chevrolet	59.120

== Race ==
=== Summary ===
Austin Hill started on pole, but Ross Chastain quickly shot past him. In the first turn of the race, Stewart Friesen brought out the caution after he got loose under Sheldon Creed and turned into the outside wall, also getting smacked by Anthony Alfredo. Friesen's truck was damaged to the point where he could not continue, ultimately ending his day before completing a single lap. Alfredo was only able to complete two more laps before his day also ended.

On the restart, Bryan Dauzat spun and immediately brought out the caution again. Chastain dominated and won stage 1. Hill had engine problems on lap 22 and was forced to park his truck in the garage. Chastain pitted with 3 laps remaining in stage 2, giving the stage win to Harrison Burton.

Chastain regained the lead after Burton pitted, and was never challenged again during the race. He won the race ahead of Tyler Ankrum, dedicating the race win to late crew chief Nick Harrison, who had died a week before the race.

=== Stage Results ===
Stage One Laps: 15

Pos	No	Driver	Team	Manufacturer	Points
1	45	Ross Chastain	Niece Motorsports	Chevrolet	10
2	2	Sheldon Creed (R)	GMS Racing	Chevrolet	9
3	18	Harrison Burton (R)	Kyle Busch Motorsports	Toyota	8
4	16	Austin Hill	Hattori Racing Enterprises	Toyota	7
5	24	Brett Moffitt	GMS Racing	Chevrolet	6
6	98	Grant Enfinger	ThorSport Racing	Ford	5
7	51	Christian Eckes	Kyle Busch Motorsports	Toyota	4
8	4	Todd Gilliland	Kyle Busch Motorsports	Toyota	3
9	02	Tyler Dippel (R)	Young's Motorsports	Chevrolet	2
10	17	Tyler Ankrum (R)	DGR-Crosley	Toyota	1

Stage Two Laps: 15

Pos	No	Driver	Team	Manufacturer	Points
1	18	Harrison Burton (R)	Kyle Busch Motorsports	Toyot	10
2	24	Brett Moffitt	GMS Racing	Chevrolet	9
3	98	Grant Enfinger	ThorSport Racing	Ford	8
4	99	Ben Rhodes	ThorSport Racing	Ford	7
5	88	Matt Crafton	ThorSport Racing	Ford	6
6	12	Gus Dean (R)	Young's Motorsports	Chevrolet	5
7	02	Tyler Dippel (R)	Young's Motorsports	Chevrolet	4
8	4	Todd Gilliland	Kyle Busch Motorsports	Toyota	3
9	3	Jordan Anderson	Jordan Anderson Racing	Chevrolet	2
10	22	Austin Wayne Self	AM Racing	Chevrolet	1

=== Final Stage Results ===
Stage Three Laps: 30

Pos	Grid	No	Driver	Team	Manufacturer	Laps	Points
1	2	45	Ross Chastain	Niece Motorsports	Chevrolet	60	50
2	9	17	Tyler Ankrum (R)	DGR-Crosley	Toyota	60	36
3	6	18	Harrison Burton (R)	Kyle Busch Motorsports	Toyota	60	52
4	13	51	Christian Eckes	Kyle Busch Motorsports	Toyota	60	37
5	4	24	Brett Moffitt	GMS Racing	Chevrolet	60	47
6	8	88	Matt Crafton	ThorSport Racing	Ford	60	37
7	7	4	Todd Gilliland	Kyle Busch Motorsports	Toyota	60	36
8	16	13	Johnny Sauter	ThorSport Racing	Ford	60	29
9	15	99	Ben Rhodes	ThorSport Racing	Ford	60	35
10	10	98	Grant Enfinger	ThorSport Racing	Ford	60	40
11	20	02	Tyler Dippel (R)	Young's Motorsports	Chevrolet	60	32
12	22	8	Tony Mrakovich	NEMCO Motorsports	Chevrolet	60	25
13	12	3	Jordan Anderson	Jordan Anderson Racing	Chevrolet	60	26
14	17	12	Gus Dean (R)	Young's Motorsports	Chevrolet	60	28
15	18	22	Austin Wayne Self	AM Racing	Chevrolet	60	23
16	24	54	Natalie Decker (R)	DGR-Crosley	Toyota	60	21
17	23	34	Mason Massey	Reaume Brothers Racing	Chevrolet	60	20
18	25	20	Spencer Boyd (R)	Young's Motorsports	Chevrolet	60	19
19	27	49	Ray Ciccarelli	CMI Motorsports	Chevrolet	59	18
20	26	33	Josh Reaume	Reaume Brothers Racing	Chevrolet	59	17
21	32	10	Jennifer Jo Cobb	Jennifer Jo Cobb Racing	Chevrolet	59	16
22	29	6	Norm Benning	Norm Benning Racing	Chevrolet	58	15
23	11	44	Bayley Currey	Niece Motorsports	Chevrolet	58	14
24	30	28	Bryan Dauzat	FDNY Racing	Chevrolet	58	13
25	5	2	Sheldon Creed (R)	GMS Racing	Chevrolet	56	21
26	21	38	T. J. Bell	Niece Motorsports	Chevrolet	33	11
27	28	32	Bryant Barnhill	Reaume Brothers Racing	Chevrolet	26	10
28	19	87	Joe Nemechek	NEMCO Motorsports	Chevrolet	24	9
29	31	0	Daniel Sasnett	Jennifer Jo Cobb Racing	Chevrolet	21	8
30	1	16	Austin Hill	Hattori Racing Enterprises	Toyota	21	14
31	14	15	Anthony Alfredo (R)	DGR-Crosley	Toyota	2	6
32	3	52	Stewart Friesen	Halmar Friesen Racing	Chevrolet	0	5

Previous race: 2019 Buckle Up in Your Truck 225	NASCAR Gander Outdoors Truck Series; 2019 season	Next race: 2019 Eldora Dirt Derby
