= 2018 M&M's 200 =

2018 M&M's 200 presented by Casey's General Stores
Race details
- Race 9 of 23 of the 2018 NASCAR Camping World Truck Series
- Date: June 16, 2018
- Official name: M&M's 200 presented by Casey's General Stores
- Location: Newton, Iowa, Iowa Speedway
- Course: Permanent racing facility
- Course length: 0.875 miles (1.408 km)
- Distance: 200 laps, 175 mi (281.635 km)
- Scheduled distance: 200 laps, 175 mi (281.635 km)
- Average speed: 89.936 miles per hour (144.738 km/h)

Pole position
Driver	Harrison Burton	Kyle Busch Motorsports
- Time: 23.669

Most laps led
Driver	Brett Moffitt	Hattori Racing Enterprises
- Laps: 76

Winner
No. 16	Brett Moffitt	Hattori Racing Enterprises

Television in the United States
- Network: Fox Sports 1
- Announcers: Vince Welch, Michael Waltrip, Phil Parsons

Radio in the United States
- Radio: Motor Racing Network

The 2018 M&M's 200 presented by Casey's General Store was the ninth stock car race of the 2018 NASCAR Camping World Truck Series season and the 10th iteration of the event. The race was held on Saturday, June 16, 2018 in Newton, Iowa at Iowa Speedway, a 7/8 mile (1.4 km) permanent D-shaped oval racetrack. The race took the scheduled 200 laps to complete. At race's end, Brett Moffitt of Hattori Racing Enterprises would survive a hard-charging Noah Gragson and a banzai last-turn move to win his 3rd ever NASCAR Camping World Truck Series career win and the 2nd win of the season. To fill out the podium, Noah Gragson and Harrison Burton, both from Kyle Busch Motorsports would finish 2nd and 3rd, respectively.

Bryant Barnhill would try and make his first career NASCAR Camping World Truck Series start, but would fail to qualify.

== Background ==
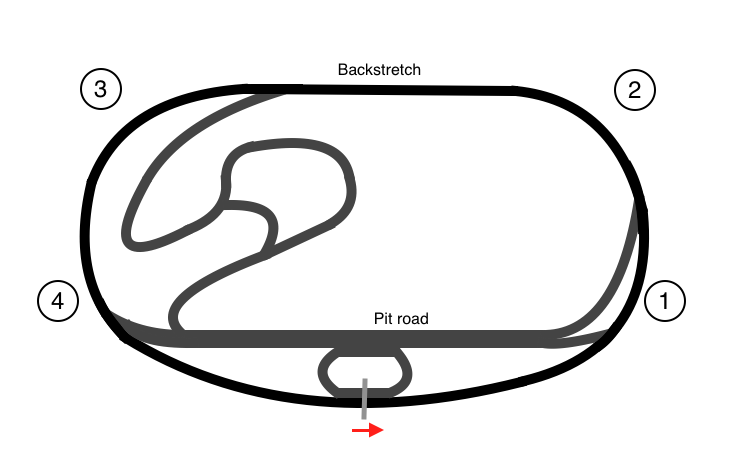
The layout of Iowa Speedway, the venue where the race was held.

Iowa Speedway is a 7/8-mile (1.4 km) paved oval motor racing track in Newton, Iowa, United States, approximately 30 miles (48 km) east of Des Moines. The track was designed with influence from Rusty Wallace and patterned after Richmond Raceway, a short track where Wallace was very successful. It has over 25,000 permanent seats as well as a unique multi-tiered Recreational Vehicle viewing area along the backstretch.

=== Entry list ===
#	Driver	Team	Make	Sponsor
0	Camden Murphy	Jennifer Jo Cobb Racing	Chevrolet	Jennifer Jo Cobb Racing
2	Cody Coughlin	GMS Racing	Chevrolet	Jegs
02	Austin Hill	Young's Motorsports	Chevrolet	Young's Motorsports
3	Jordan Anderson	Jordan Anderson Racing	Chevrolet	Bommarito Automotive Group
4	Todd Gilliland	Kyle Busch Motorsports	Toyota	SiriusXM, JBL
04	Cory Roper	Roper Racing	Ford	Preferred Industrial Contractors, Inc.
6	Norm Benning	Norm Benning Racing	Chevrolet	Zomongo
8	John Hunter Nemechek	NEMCO Motorsports	Chevrolet	Fleetwing
10	Jennifer Jo Cobb	Jennifer Jo Cobb Racing	Chevrolet	Driven2Honor.org
12	Reid Wilson	Young's Motorsports	Chevrolet	Harrison Truck Centers, OEM3 by TruNorth
13	Myatt Snider	ThorSport Racing	Ford	Louisiana Hot Sauce, The Carolina Nut Co.
15	Bobby Reuse	Premium Motorsports	Chevrolet	WCIParts.com
16	Brett Moffitt	Hattori Racing Enterprises	Toyota	Destiny Homes S.M.A.R.T. Series
18	Noah Gragson	Kyle Busch Motorsports	Toyota	Safelite Auto Glass
20	Tanner Thorson	Young's Motorsports	Chevrolet	GoShare
21	Johnny Sauter	GMS Racing	Chevrolet	ISM Connect Patriotic
22	Austin Wayne Self	Niece Motorsports	Chevrolet	AM Technical Solutions, GO TEXAN.
24	Justin Haley	GMS Racing	Chevrolet	Fraternal Order of Eagles Patriotic
25	Dalton Sargeant	GMS Racing	Chevrolet	Performance Plus Motor Oil
33	Josh Reaume	Reaume Brothers Racing	Chevrolet	Colonial Countertops
41	Ben Rhodes	ThorSport Racing	Ford	Alpha Energy Solutions
45	Justin Fontaine	Niece Motorsports	Chevrolet	ProMatic Automation
46	Christian Eckes	Kyle Busch Motorsports	Toyota	Mobil 1
49	Wendell Chavous	Premium Motorsports	Chevrolet	SobrietyNation.org
50	Ross Chastain	Beaver Motorsports	Chevrolet	VIPRacingExperience.com
51	Harrison Burton	Kyle Busch Motorsports	Toyota	Morton Buildings
52	Stewart Friesen	Halmar Friesen Racing	Chevrolet	Halmar "We Build America"
54	David Gilliland	DGR-Crosley	Toyota	Crosley Brands
63	J. J. Yeley	Copp Motorsports	Chevrolet	Copp Motorsports
74	Bryant Barnhill	Mike Harmon Racing	Chevrolet	Barnhill Realty, Koolbox
83	Bayley Currey	Copp Motorsports	Chevrolet	Copp Motorsports
87	Joe Nemechek	NEMCO Motorsports	Chevrolet	Romco Equipment Co.
88	Matt Crafton	ThorSport Racing	Ford	Menards, Jack Link's
97	Jesse Little	JJL Motorsports	Ford	JJL Motorsports
98	Grant Enfinger	ThorSport Racing	Ford	Protect the Harvest
Official entry list

== Practice ==
=== First practice ===
The first practice would take place on 8:35 AM CST. Justin Haley of GMS Racing would set the fastest time with a 23.456 and an average speed of 134.294 miles per hour (216.125 km/h).

Pos.	#	Driver	Team	Make	Time	Speed
1	24	Justin Haley	GMS Racing	Chevrolet	23.456	134.294
2	2	Cody Coughlin	GMS Racing	Chevrolet	23.464	134.248
3	16	Brett Moffitt	Hattori Racing Enterprises	Toyota	23.586	133.554
Full first practice results

=== Second and final practice ===
The second and final practice would take place on 11:00 AM CST. Harrison Burton of Kyle Busch Motorsports would set the fastest time in final practice, with a 23.472 and an average speed of 134.202 miles per hour (215.977 km/h).

Pos.	#	Driver	Team	Make	Time	Speed
1	51	Harrison Burton	Kyle Busch Motorsports	Toyota	23.472	134.202
2	25	Dalton Sargeant	GMS Racing	Chevrolet	23.534	133.849
3	21	Johnny Sauter	GMS Racing	Chevrolet	23.617	133.378
Full final practice results

== Qualifying ==
Qualifying would take place on 3:30 PM CST. Since Iowa Speedway is under 1.5 miles (2.4 km), the qualifying system was a multi-car system that included three rounds. The first round was 15 minutes, where every driver would be able to set a lap within the 15 minutes. Then, the second round would consist of the fastest 24 cars in Round 1, and drivers would have 10 minutes to set a lap. Round 3 consisted of the fastest 12 drivers from Round 2, and the drivers would have 5 minutes to set a time. Whoever was fastest in Round 3 would win the pole.

Harrison Burton of Kyle Busch Motorsports would set the fastest time in Round 3, with a 23.669 and an average speed of 133.085 miles per hour (214.180 km/h).

Pos.	#	Driver	Team	Make	Time (R1)	Speed (R1)	Time (R2)	Speed (R2)	Time (R3)	Speed (R3)
1	51	Harrison Burton	Kyle Busch Motorsports	Toyota	23.711	132.850	23.753	132.615	23.669	133.085
2	88	Matt Crafton	ThorSport Racing	Ford	24.070	130.868	23.725	132.771	23.686	132.990
3	18	Noah Gragson	Kyle Busch Motorsports	Toyota	23.786	132.431	23.697	132.928	23.694	132.945
4	4	Todd Gilliland	Kyle Busch Motorsports	Toyota	24.339	129.422	23.658	133.147	23.745	132.660
5	52	Stewart Friesen	Halmar Friesen Racing	Chevrolet	23.804	132.331	23.712	132.844	23.746	132.654
6	24	Justin Haley	GMS Racing	Chevrolet	23.911	131.739	23.944	131.557	23.866	131.987
7	21	Johnny Sauter	GMS Racing	Chevrolet	23.895	131.827	23.935	131.606	23.871	131.959
8	8	John Hunter Nemechek	NEMCO Motorsports	Chevrolet	23.929	131.639	23.954	131.502	23.885	131.882
9	46	Christian Eckes	Kyle Busch Motorsports	Toyota	23.982	131.349	23.773	132.503	23.895	131.827
10	25	Dalton Sargeant	GMS Racing	Chevrolet	23.968	131.425	23.952	131.513	23.905	131.772
11	41	Ben Rhodes	ThorSport Racing	Ford	23.963	131.453	23.947	131.540	24.046	130.999
12	54	David Gilliland	DGR-Crosley	Toyota	23.963	131.453	23.960	131.469	24.088	130.771
Eliminated in Round 2
13	97	Jesse Little	JJL Motorsports	Ford	24.177	130.289	23.969	131.420	—	—
14	2	Cody Coughlin	GMS Racing	Chevrolet	23.969	131.420	23.970	131.414	—	—
15	98	Grant Enfinger	ThorSport Racing	Ford	23.801	132.347	23.980	131.359	—	—
16	16	Brett Moffitt	Hattori Racing Enterprises	Toyota	23.791	132.403	24.021	131.135	—	—
17	13	Myatt Snider	ThorSport Racing	Ford	23.984	131.338	24.074	130.847	—	—
18	02	Austin Hill	Young's Motorsports	Chevrolet	24.129	130.548	24.094	130.738	—	—
19	22	Austin Wayne Self	Niece Motorsports	Chevrolet	24.092	130.749	24.123	130.581	—	—
20	12	Reid Wilson	Young's Motorsports	Chevrolet	24.254	129.875	24.158	130.392	—	—
21	87	Joe Nemechek	NEMCO Motorsports	Chevrolet	24.010	131.195	24.215	130.085	—	—
22	20	Tanner Thorson	Young's Motorsports	Chevrolet	24.015	131.168	24.311	129.571	—	—
23	3	Jordan Anderson	Jordan Anderson Racing	Chevrolet	24.377	129.220	24.418	129.003	—	—
24	50	Ross Chastain	Beaver Motorsports	Chevrolet	24.243	129.934	—	—	—	—
Eliminated in Round 1
25	63	J. J. Yeley	Copp Motorsports	Chevrolet	24.395	129.125	—	—	—	—
26	04	Cory Roper	Roper Racing	Ford	24.468	128.740	—	—	—	—
27	45	Justin Fontaine	Niece Motorsports	Chevrolet	24.517	128.482	—	—	—	—
Qualified by owner's points
28	49	Wendell Chavous	Premium Motorsports	Chevrolet	24.608	128.007	—	—	—	—
29	83	Bayley Currey	Copp Motorsports	Chevrolet	24.756	127.242	—	—	—	—
30	6	Norm Benning	Norm Benning Racing	Chevrolet	25.416	123.938	—	—	—	—
31	10	Jennifer Jo Cobb	Jennifer Jo Cobb Racing	Chevrolet	25.516	123.452	—	—	—	—
32	15	Bobby Reuse	Premium Motorsports	Chevrolet	26.171	120.362	—	—	—	—
Failed to qualify
33	33	Josh Reaume	Reaume Brothers Racing	Chevrolet	24.620	127.945	—	—	—	—
34	74	Bryant Barnhill	Mike Harmon Racing	Chevrolet	24.645	127.815	—	—	—	—
35	0	Camden Murphy	Jennifer Jo Cobb Racing	Chevrolet	24.790	127.067	—	—	—	—
Official qualifying results
Official starting lineup

== Race results ==
Stage 1 Laps: 60

Fin	#	Driver	Team	Make	Pts
1	8	John Hunter Nemechek	NEMCO Motorsports	Chevrolet	0
2	88	Matt Crafton	ThorSport Racing	Ford	9
3	51	Harrison Burton	Kyle Busch Motorsports	Toyota	8
4	52	Stewart Friesen	Halmar Friesen Racing	Chevrolet	7
5	21	Johnny Sauter	GMS Racing	Chevrolet	6
6	18	Noah Gragson	Kyle Busch Motorsports	Toyota	5
7	24	Justin Haley	GMS Racing	Chevrolet	4
8	16	Brett Moffitt	Hattori Racing Enterprises	Toyota	3
9	25	Dalton Sargeant	GMS Racing	Chevrolet	2
10	46	Christian Eckes	Kyle Busch Motorsports	Toyota	1

Stage 2 Laps: 60

Fin	#	Driver	Team	Make	Pts
1	52	Stewart Friesen	Halmar Friesen Racing	Chevrolet	10
2	8	John Hunter Nemechek	NEMCO Motorsports	Chevrolet	0
3	16	Brett Moffitt	Hattori Racing Enterprises	Toyota	8
4	18	Noah Gragson	Kyle Busch Motorsports	Toyota	7
5	13	Myatt Snider	ThorSport Racing	Ford	6
6	51	Harrison Burton	Kyle Busch Motorsports	Toyota	5
7	97	Jesse Little	JJL Motorsports	Ford	4
8	21	Johnny Sauter	GMS Racing	Chevrolet	3
9	54	David Gilliland	DGR-Crosley	Toyota	2
10	88	Matt Crafton	ThorSport Racing	Ford	1

Stage 3 Laps: 80

Fin	St	#	Driver	Team	Make	Laps	Led	Status	Pts
1	16	16	Brett Moffitt	Hattori Racing Enterprises	Toyota	200	76	running	51
2	3	18	Noah Gragson	Kyle Busch Motorsports	Toyota	200	7	running	47
3	1	51	Harrison Burton	Kyle Busch Motorsports	Toyota	200	30	running	47
4	12	54	David Gilliland	DGR-Crosley	Toyota	200	0	running	35
5	7	21	Johnny Sauter	GMS Racing	Chevrolet	200	0	running	41
6	13	97	Jesse Little	JJL Motorsports	Ford	200	0	running	35
7	14	2	Cody Coughlin	GMS Racing	Chevrolet	200	0	running	30
8	9	46	Christian Eckes	Kyle Busch Motorsports	Toyota	200	4	running	30
9	5	52	Stewart Friesen	Halmar Friesen Racing	Chevrolet	200	48	running	45
10	17	13	Myatt Snider	ThorSport Racing	Ford	200	0	running	33
11	15	98	Grant Enfinger	ThorSport Racing	Ford	200	0	running	26
12	27	45	Justin Fontaine	Niece Motorsports	Chevrolet	200	0	running	25
13	22	20	Tanner Thorson	Young's Motorsports	Chevrolet	199	0	running	24
14	18	02	Austin Hill	Young's Motorsports	Chevrolet	199	0	running	23
15	19	22	Austin Wayne Self	Niece Motorsports	Chevrolet	199	0	running	22
16	6	24	Justin Haley	GMS Racing	Chevrolet	196	0	running	25
17	11	41	Ben Rhodes	ThorSport Racing	Ford	195	0	running	20
18	26	04	Cory Roper	Roper Racing	Ford	195	0	running	19
19	10	25	Dalton Sargeant	GMS Racing	Chevrolet	195	0	running	20
20	30	6	Norm Benning	Norm Benning Racing	Chevrolet	194	0	running	17
21	28	49	Wendell Chavous	Premium Motorsports	Chevrolet	191	0	running	16
22	31	10	Jennifer Jo Cobb	Jennifer Jo Cobb Racing	Chevrolet	173	0	running	15
23	23	3	Jordan Anderson	Jordan Anderson Racing	Chevrolet	153	0	engine	14
24	29	83	Bayley Currey	Copp Motorsports	Chevrolet	152	0	engine	13
25	32	15	Bobby Reuse	Premium Motorsports	Chevrolet	136	0	suspension	12
26	2	88	Matt Crafton	ThorSport Racing	Ford	135	20	crash	21
27	8	8	John Hunter Nemechek	NEMCO Motorsports	Chevrolet	135	15	crash	0
28	20	12	Reid Wilson	Young's Motorsports	Chevrolet	109	0	overheating	9
29	4	4	Todd Gilliland	Kyle Busch Motorsports	Toyota	102	0	crash	8
30	24	50	Ross Chastain	Beaver Motorsports	Chevrolet	56	0	suspension	7
31	21	87	Joe Nemechek	NEMCO Motorsports	Chevrolet	50	0	brakes	6
32	25	63	J. J. Yeley	Copp Motorsports	Chevrolet	19	0	brakes	0
Failed to qualify
33		33	Josh Reaume	Reaume Brothers Racing	Chevrolet				
34		74	Bryant Barnhill	Mike Harmon Racing	Chevrolet				
35		0	Camden Murphy	Jennifer Jo Cobb Racing	Chevrolet				
Official race results

Previous race: 2018 PPG 400	NASCAR Camping World Truck Series; 2018 season	Next race: 2018 Eaton 200
