= 2020 Sunoco 159 =

Race details
- Race 12 of 23 of the 2020 NASCAR Gander RV & Outdoors Truck Series
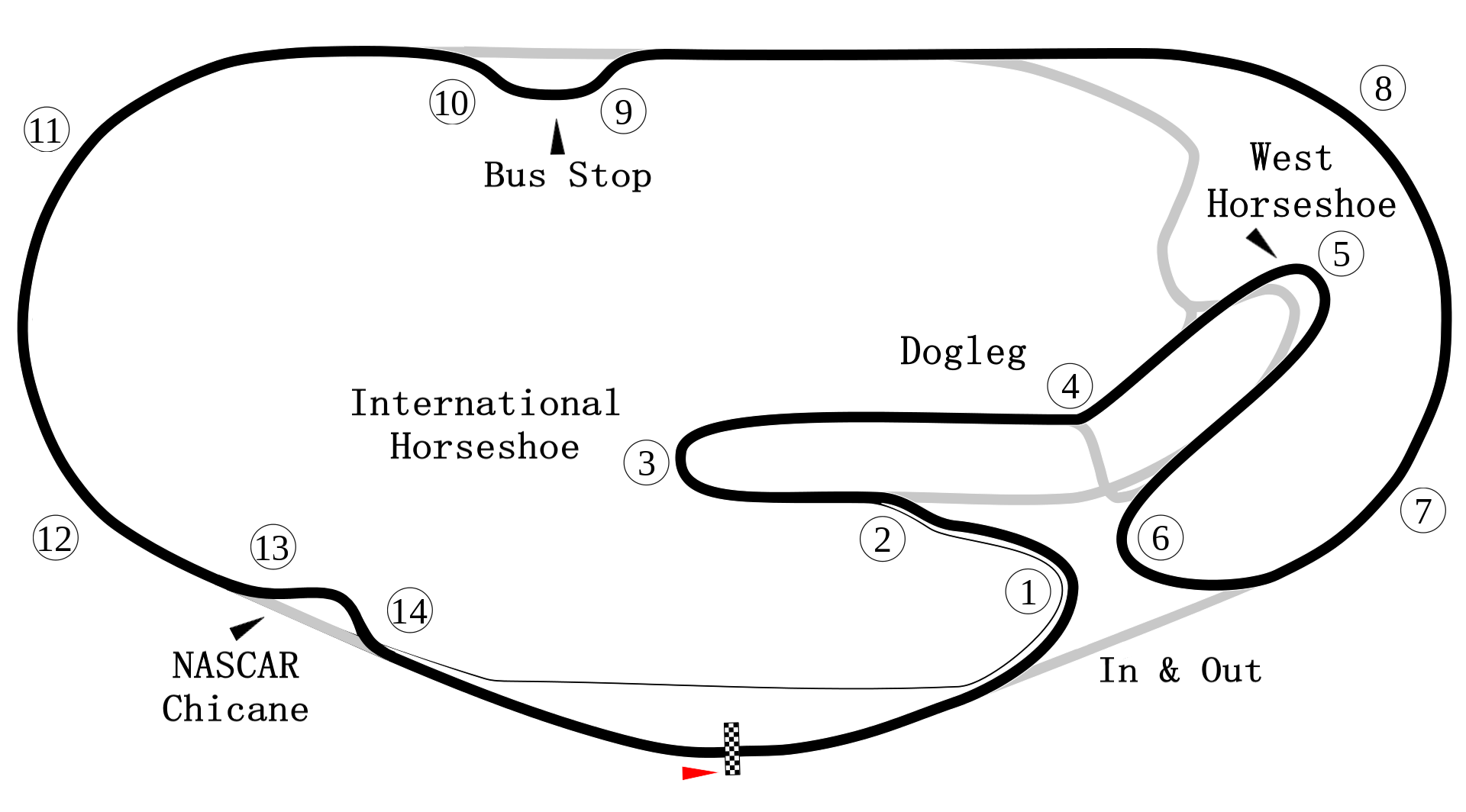
- Date: August 16, 2020
- Official name: Sunoco 159
- Location: Daytona Beach, Florida, Daytona International Speedway road course
- Course: Permanent racing facility
- Course length: 3.57 miles (5.75 km)
- Distance: 46 laps, 166.06 mi (267.47 km)
- Scheduled distance: 44 laps, 158.840 mi (255.628201 km)
- Average speed: 81.435 miles per hour (131.057 km/h)

Pole position
Driver	Zane Smith	GMS Racing
- Grid positions set by competition-based formula

Most laps led
Driver	Sheldon Creed	GMS Racing
- Laps: 19

Winner
No. 2	Sheldon Creed	GMS Racing

Television in the United States
- Network: Fox Sports 1
- Announcers: Vince Welch, Michael Waltrip, and Jamie McMurray

Radio in the United States
- Radio: Motor Racing Network

The 2020 Sunoco 159 was the 12th stock car race of the 2020 NASCAR Gander RV & Outdoors Truck Series season and the inaugural running of the event, after the scheduled race, the M&M's 200 at Iowa Speedway, had to be replaced due to the COVID-19 pandemic. The race was held on Sunday, August 16, 2020 in Daytona Beach, Florida at the Daytona International Speedway road course, a 3.57 miles (5.75 km) permanent road course. The race was extended from the scheduled 44 laps to 46 laps due to a NASCAR overtime finish. At race's end, Sheldon Creed of GMS Racing would pull away on the final restart to win the race, the 2nd NASCAR Gander RV & Outdoors Truck Series win of his career and the 2nd of the season. To fill the podium, Brett Moffitt of GMS Racing and Austin Hill of Hattori Racing Enterprises would finish 2nd and 3rd, respectively.

On July 30, it was revealed after simulation testing revealed concerns of high speeds entering turn 1 (a turn already considered to be difficult among road racers), a temporary chicane was added in between the 4th turn of the oval and the entrance to pit road (similar to the Charlotte ROVAL). NASCAR further announced that it would use the high-downforce aero package used for the road course races in 2019 (in 2020, road courses were scheduled to use a low-downforce package similar to what was used in 2018 and what is used on ovals 1-mile or shorter in 2020). The addition of the chicane increased the length of the course from 3.56 to 3.61 miles and added a 13th and 14th turn to the original 12-turn layout.

== Entry list ==
#	Driver	Team	Make
00	Bobby Kennedy	Reaume Brothers Racing	Toyota
2	Sheldon Creed	GMS Racing	Chevrolet
02	Tate Fogleman	Young's Motorsports	Chevrolet
3	Jordan Anderson	Jordan Anderson Racing	Chevrolet
4	Raphaël Lessard	Kyle Busch Motorsports	Toyota
04	Cory Roper	Roper Racing	Ford
6	Norm Benning	Norm Benning Racing	Chevrolet
8	Mike Skeen	NEMCO Motorsports	Chevrolet
9	Codie Rohrbaugh	CR7 Motorsports	Chevrolet
10	Jennifer Jo Cobb	Jennifer Jo Cobb Racing	Chevrolet
11	Spencer Davis	Spencer Davis Motorsports	Toyota
13	Johnny Sauter	ThorSport Racing	Ford
15	Tanner Gray	DGR-Crosley	Ford
16	Austin Hill	Hattori Racing Enterprises	Toyota
18	Christian Eckes	Kyle Busch Motorsports	Toyota
19	Derek Kraus	McAnally–Hilgemann Racing	Toyota
20	Spencer Boyd	Young's Motorsports	Chevrolet
21	Zane Smith	GMS Racing	Chevrolet
22	Austin Wayne Self	AM Racing	Chevrolet
23	Brett Moffitt	GMS Racing	Chevrolet
24	Kris Wright	GMS Racing	Chevrolet
26	Tyler Ankrum	GMS Racing	Chevrolet
30	Scott Lagasse Jr.	On Point Motorsports	Toyota
33	Bryan Collyer	Reaume Brothers Racing	Toyota
38	Todd Gilliland	Front Row Motorsports	Ford
40	Carson Hocevar	Niece Motorsports	Chevrolet
42	Mark Smith	Niece Motorsports	Chevrolet
44	Natalie Decker	Niece Motorsports	Chevrolet
45	Ty Majeski	Niece Motorsports	Chevrolet
49	Roger Reuse	CMI Motorsports	Chevrolet
51	Alex Tagliani	Kyle Busch Motorsports	Toyota
52	Stewart Friesen	Halmar Friesen Racing	Toyota
56	Tyler Hill	Hill Motorsports	Chevrolet
68	Bobby Reuse*	Clay Greenfield Motorsports	Chevrolet
75	Parker Kligerman	Henderson Motorsports	Chevrolet
83	Tim Viens	CMI Motorsports	Chevrolet
88	Matt Crafton	ThorSport Racing	Ford
98	Grant Enfinger	ThorSport Racing	Ford
99	Ben Rhodes	ThorSport Racing	Ford
Official entry list

== Starting lineup ==
A new metric qualifying system was placed starting for the Daytona Road Course weekend. To determine the spots, new performance metrics would be weighted and averaged to determine a score. The metrics would be 50% on the finishing position from last race, 35% on team owner's points, and 15% on the fastest lap. As a result, Zane Smith of GMS Racing would win the pole.

Pos.	#	Driver	Team	Make
1	21	Zane Smith	GMS Racing	Chevrolet
2	18	Christian Eckes	Kyle Busch Motorsports	Toyota
3	23	Brett Moffitt	GMS Racing	Chevrolet
4	16	Austin Hill	Hattori Racing Enterprises	Toyota
5	26	Tyler Ankrum	GMS Racing	Chevrolet
6	38	Todd Gilliland	Front Row Motorsports	Ford
7	15	Tanner Gray	DGR-Crosley	Ford
8	99	Ben Rhodes	ThorSport Racing	Ford
9	19	Derek Kraus	McAnally–Hilgemann Racing	Toyota
10	4	Raphaël Lessard	Kyle Busch Motorsports	Toyota
11	13	Johnny Sauter	ThorSport Racing	Ford
12	88	Matt Crafton	ThorSport Racing	Ford
13	45	Ty Majeski	Niece Motorsports	Chevrolet
14	2	Sheldon Creed	GMS Racing	Chevrolet
15	02	Tate Fogleman	Young's Motorsports	Chevrolet
16	75	Parker Kligerman	Henderson Motorsports	Chevrolet
17	98	Grant Enfinger	ThorSport Racing	Ford
18	9	Codie Rohrbaugh	CR7 Motorsports	Chevrolet
19	56	Tyler Hill	Hill Motorsports	Chevrolet
20	04	Cory Roper	Roper Racing	Ford
21	51	Alex Tagliani	Kyle Busch Motorsports	Toyota
22	52	Stewart Friesen	Halmar Friesen Racing	Toyota
23	22	Austin Wayne Self	AM Racing	Chevrolet
24	20	Spencer Boyd	Young's Motorsports	Chevrolet
25	3	Jordan Anderson	Jordan Anderson Racing	Chevrolet
26	24	Kris Wright	GMS Racing	Chevrolet
27	40	Carson Hocevar	Niece Motorsports	Chevrolet
28	10	Jennifer Jo Cobb	Jennifer Jo Cobb Racing	Chevrolet
29	44	Natalie Decker	Niece Motorsports	Chevrolet
30	30	Scott Lagasse Jr.	On Point Motorsports	Toyota
31	11	Spencer Davis	Spencer Davis Motorsports	Toyota
32	6	Norm Benning	Norm Benning Racing	Chevrolet
33	00	Bobby Kennedy	Reaume Brothers Racing	Toyota
34	33	Bryan Collyer	Reaume Brothers Racing	Toyota
35	42	Mark Smith	Niece Motorsports	Chevrolet
36	49	Roger Reuse	CMI Motorsports	Chevrolet
37	8	Mike Skeen	NEMCO Motorsports	Chevrolet
38	83	Tim Viens	CMI Motorsports	Chevrolet
Official starting lineup

== Race results ==
Stage 1 Laps: 12

Fin	#	Driver	Team	Make	Pts
1	23	Brett Moffitt	GMS Racing	Chevrolet	10
2	2	Sheldon Creed	GMS Racing	Chevrolet	9
3	18	Christian Eckes	Kyle Busch Motorsports	Toyota	8
4	16	Austin Hill	Hattori Racing Enterprises	Toyota	7
5	38	Todd Gilliland	Front Row Motorsports	Ford	6
6	99	Ben Rhodes	ThorSport Racing	Ford	5
7	26	Tyler Ankrum	GMS Racing	Chevrolet	4
8	15	Tanner Gray	DGR-Crosley	Ford	3
9	22	Austin Wayne Self	AM Racing	Chevrolet	2
10	19	Derek Kraus	McAnally–Hilgemann Racing	Toyota	1

Stage 2 Laps: 13

Fin	#	Driver	Team	Make	Pts
1	2	Sheldon Creed	GMS Racing	Chevrolet	10
2	16	Austin Hill	Hattori Racing Enterprises	Toyota	9
3	26	Tyler Ankrum	GMS Racing	Chevrolet	8
4	21	Zane Smith	GMS Racing	Chevrolet	7
5	24	Kris Wright	GMS Racing	Chevrolet	6
6	11	Spencer Davis	Spencer Davis Motorsports	Toyota	5
7	4	Raphaël Lessard	Kyle Busch Motorsports	Toyota	4
8	51	Alex Tagliani	Kyle Busch Motorsports	Toyota	3
9	23	Brett Moffitt	GMS Racing	Chevrolet	2
10	45	Ty Majeski	Niece Motorsports	Chevrolet	1

Stage 3 Laps: 21

Fin	St	#	Driver	Team	Make	Laps	Led	Status	Pts
1	14	2	Sheldon Creed	GMS Racing	Chevrolet	46	19	running	59
2	3	23	Brett Moffitt	GMS Racing	Chevrolet	46	13	running	47
3	10	4	Raphaël Lessard	Kyle Busch Motorsports	Toyota	46	3	running	38
4	12	88	Matt Crafton	ThorSport Racing	Ford	46	7	running	33
5	4	16	Austin Hill	Hattori Racing Enterprises	Toyota	46	1	running	48
6	5	26	Tyler Ankrum	GMS Racing	Chevrolet	46	0	running	43
7	17	98	Grant Enfinger	ThorSport Racing	Ford	46	0	running	30
8	16	75	Parker Kligerman	Henderson Motorsports	Chevrolet	46	0	running	29
9	30	30	Scott Lagasse Jr.	On Point Motorsports	Toyota	46	0	running	28
10	22	52	Stewart Friesen	Halmar Friesen Racing	Toyota	46	0	running	27
11	23	22	Austin Wayne Self	AM Racing	Chevrolet	46	0	running	28
12	2	18	Christian Eckes	Kyle Busch Motorsports	Toyota	46	3	running	33
13	1	21	Zane Smith	GMS Racing	Chevrolet	46	0	running	31
14	8	99	Ben Rhodes	ThorSport Racing	Ford	46	0	running	28
15	7	15	Tanner Gray	DGR-Crosley	Ford	46	0	running	25
16	19	56	Tyler Hill	Hill Motorsports	Chevrolet	46	0	running	21
17	24	20	Spencer Boyd	Young's Motorsports	Chevrolet	46	0	running	20
18	34	33	Bryan Collyer	Reaume Brothers Racing	Toyota	46	0	running	19
19	15	02	Tate Fogleman	Young's Motorsports	Chevrolet	46	0	running	18
20	29	44	Natalie Decker	Niece Motorsports	Chevrolet	46	0	running	17
21	11	13	Johnny Sauter	ThorSport Racing	Ford	46	0	running	16
22	21	51	Alex Tagliani	Kyle Busch Motorsports	Toyota	46	0	running	18
23	37	8	Mike Skeen	NEMCO Motorsports	Chevrolet	46	0	running	14
24	38	83	Tim Viens	CMI Motorsports	Chevrolet	46	0	running	13
25	26	24	Kris Wright	GMS Racing	Chevrolet	46	0	running	18
26	20	04	Cory Roper	Roper Racing	Ford	45	0	running	11
27	32	6	Norm Benning	Norm Benning Racing	Chevrolet	42	0	running	10
28	27	40	Carson Hocevar	Niece Motorsports	Chevrolet	41	0	crash	9
29	18	9	Codie Rohrbaugh	CR7 Motorsports	Chevrolet	41	0	running	8
30	9	19	Derek Kraus	McAnally–Hilgemann Racing	Toyota	40	0	electrical	8
31	28	10	Jennifer Jo Cobb	Jennifer Jo Cobb Racing	Chevrolet	38	0	running	6
32	13	45	Ty Majeski	Niece Motorsports	Chevrolet	36	0	overheating	6
33	6	38	Todd Gilliland	Front Row Motorsports	Ford	36	0	electrical	11
34	31	11	Spencer Davis	Spencer Davis Motorsports	Toyota	35	0	brakes	10
35	25	3	Jordan Anderson	Jordan Anderson Racing	Chevrolet	31	0	drivetrain	5
36	35	42	Mark Smith	Niece Motorsports	Chevrolet	31	0	brakes	5
37	33	00	Bobby Kennedy	Reaume Brothers Racing	Toyota	15	0	ignition	5
38	36	49	Roger Reuse	CMI Motorsports	Chevrolet	0	0	clutch	5
Official race results

Previous race: 2020 Henry Ford Health System 200	NASCAR Gander RV & Outdoors Truck Series; 2020 season	Next race: 2020 KDI Office Technology 200
