= Triple Truck Challenge =

Series of races in the NASCAR Craftsman Truck Series

Tournament information
- Sport: Auto racing
- Established: 2019
- Format: bonus program for race winners
- Host: NASCAR
- Participants: NASCAR Craftsman Truck Series

The Triple Truck Challenge is a bonus program for race winners for designated races in the NASCAR Craftsman Truck Series each season that is designed to give attention to series regulars. The program debuted in 2019.

== History ==
On February 4, 2019, NASCAR announced the formation of the Triple Truck Challenge. The Challenge consisted of three consecutive races, held at Texas Motor Speedway, Iowa Speedway and Gateway Motorsports Park. Only drivers eligible for Truck Series points could be on the entry lists for those races. If a driver won one of the three races, a $50,000 prize was awarded; if a driver won two of the three races, a $200,000 prize was awarded; and if a driver won all three races, a $500,000 prize was awarded. Greg Biffle won the first race of the challenge, driving for Kyle Busch Motorsports in a one-off entry, and was not eligible to win the bonus money for the next race at Iowa due to not being listed on the preliminary entry form.

For 2020, the Challenge races were planned to be to Richmond Raceway, Dover International Speedway and Charlotte Motor Speedway, again holding consecutive slots in the schedule. The requirement for a driver to be on the preliminary entry list to be eligible for the prize money was also dropped. Due to the COVID-19 pandemic, the 2020 races were changed to the Daytona International Speedway road course, a rescheduled Dover date and World Wide Technology Raceway at Gateway.

=== Host tracks ===
#	Track	Location	Year(s)
5	Gateway Motorsports Park	Madison, Illinois	2019–2020, 2022–2024
3	Charlotte Motor Speedway	Concord, North Carolina	2021, 2023–2024
3	Nashville Superspeedway	Lebanon, Tennessee	2022–2024
2	Bristol Motor Speedway	Bristol, Tennessee	2025–2026
2	Darlington Raceway	Darlington, South Carolina	2021, 2026
2	Rockingham Speedway	Rockingham, North Carolina	2025–2026
1	Circuit of the Americas	Austin, Texas	2021
1	Daytona International Speedway (Road course)	Daytona Beach, Florida	2020
1	Dover Motor Speedway	Dover, Delaware	2020
1	Iowa Speedway	Newton, Iowa	2019
1	Martinsville Speedway	Martinsville, Virginia	2025
1	Mid-Ohio Sports Car Course	Lexington, Ohio	2022
1	Texas Motor Speedway	Fort Worth, Texas	2019

== Results ==
Year	Race 1		Race 2		Race 3	
Year	Driver	Track	Driver	Track	Driver	Track
2019	Greg Biffle	Texas	Brett Moffitt	Iowa	Ross Chastain	Gateway
2020	Sheldon Creed	Daytona RC	Zane Smith	Dover	Sheldon Creed (2)	Gateway
2021	Sheldon Creed	Darlington	Todd Gilliland	COTA	John Hunter Nemechek	Charlotte
2022	Corey Heim	Gateway	Ryan Preece	Nashville	Parker Kligerman	Mid-Ohio
2023	Ben Rhodes	Charlotte	Grant Enfinger	Gateway	Carson Hocevar	Nashville
2024	Nick Sanchez	Charlotte	Corey Heim	Gateway	Christian Eckes	Nashville
2025	Daniel Hemric	Martinsville	Chandler Smith	Bristol	Tyler Ankrum	Rockingham
2026	Corey Heim	Darlington	Corey Heim (2)	Rockingham	Christopher Bell	Bristol

=== Won multiple races in a season ===
Season	Driver	Wins	Tracks
2020	Sheldon Creed	2	Daytona RC, Gateway
2026	Corey Heim	2	Darlington Raceway, Rockingham Speedway

== See also ==
- Dash 4 Cash
