= 2020 NASCAR Gander RV & Outdoors Truck Series =

American motorsport season

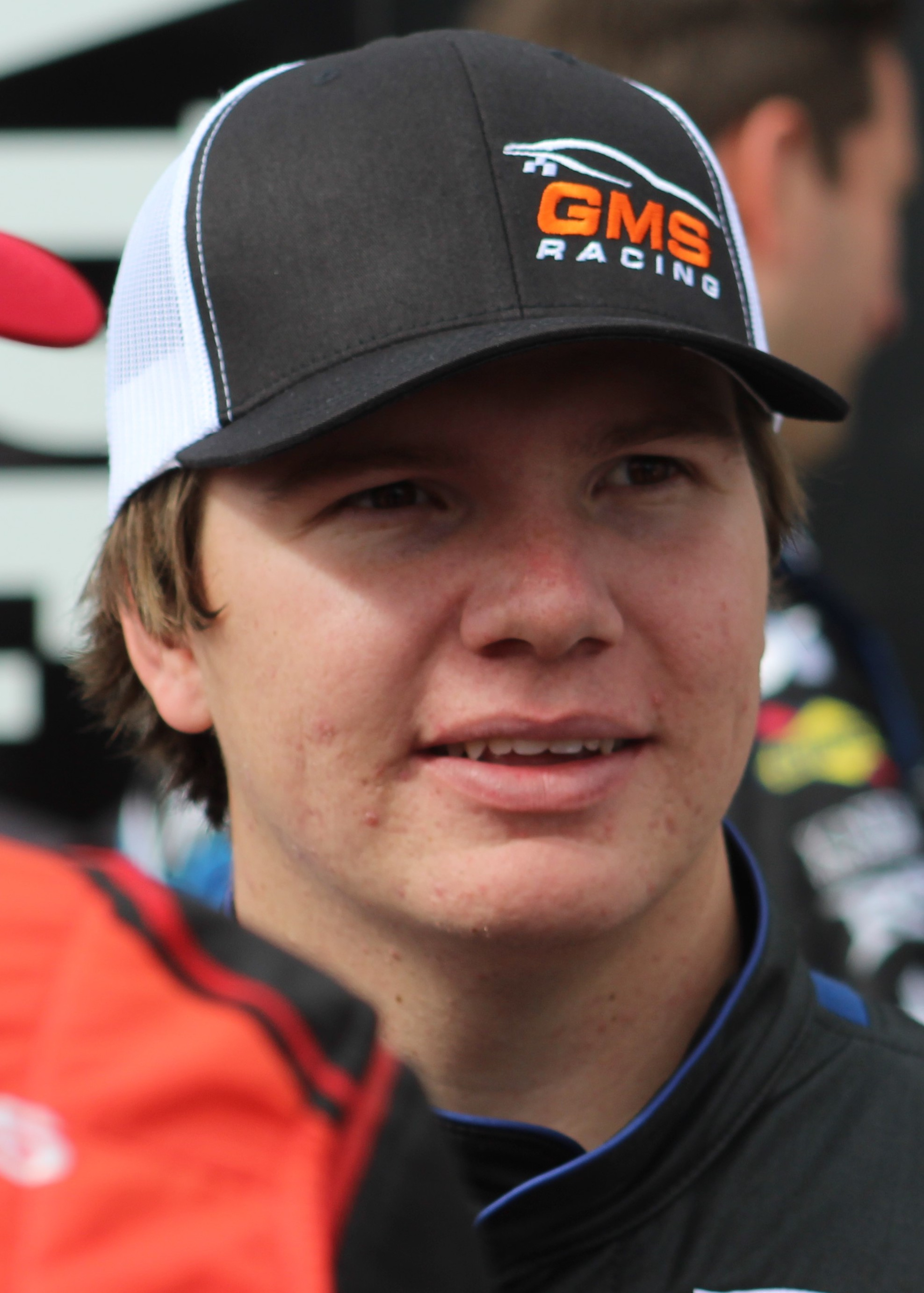
Sheldon Creed, the 2020 Gander RV & Outdoors Truck Series champion.

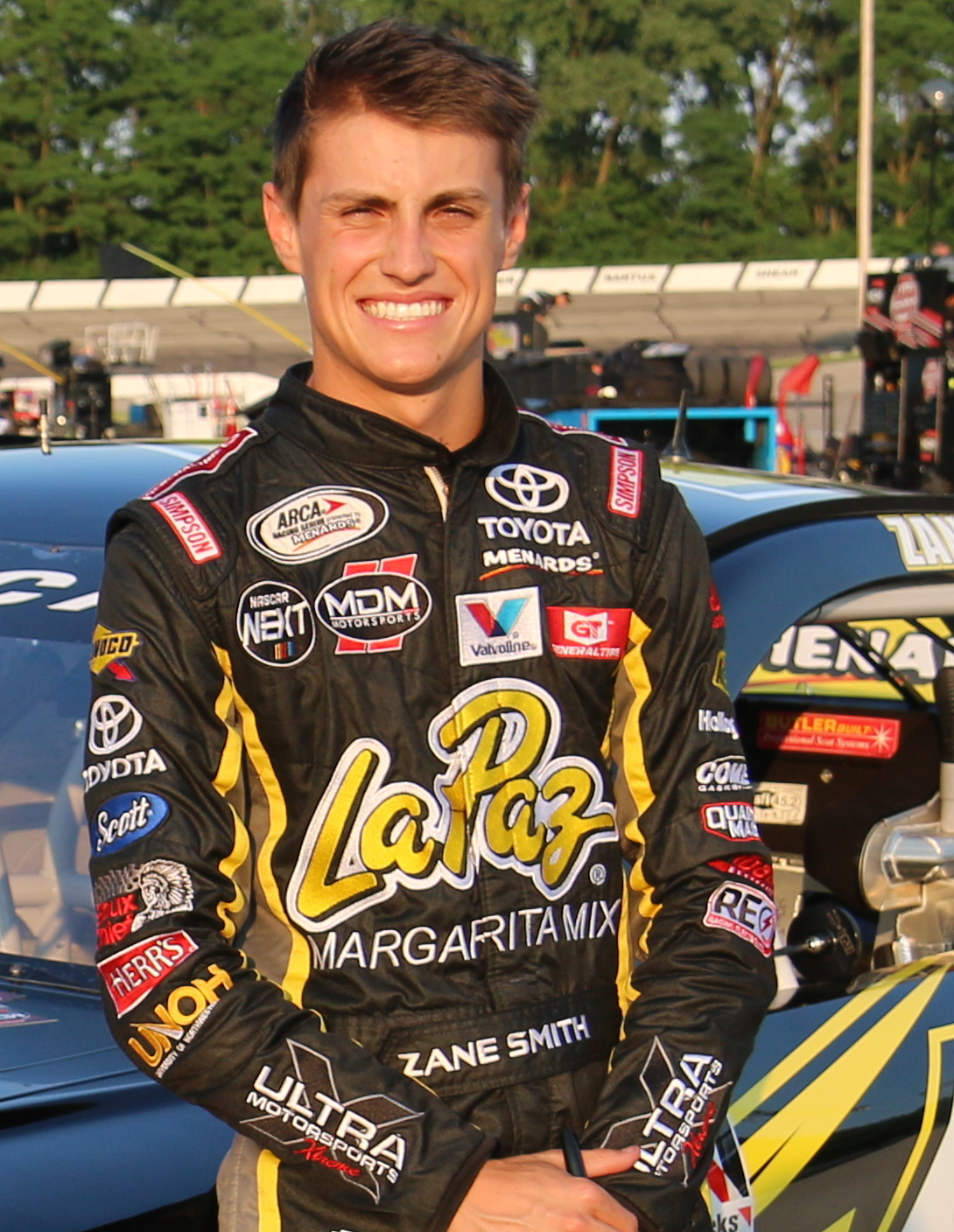
Zane Smith finished second behind Creed in the championship and won the Rookie of the year honors.

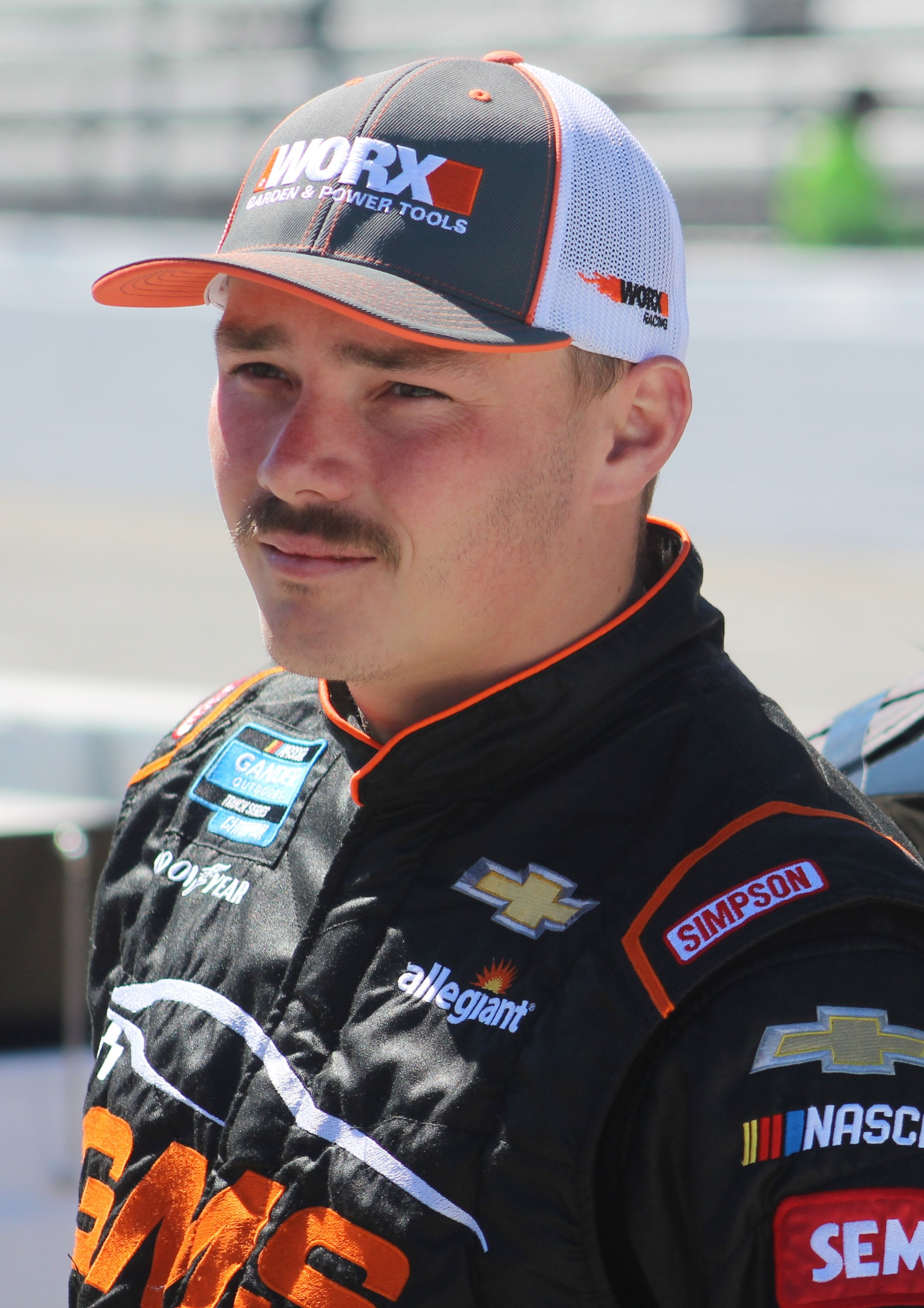
Brett Moffitt, the 2018 champion, finished third in the championship.

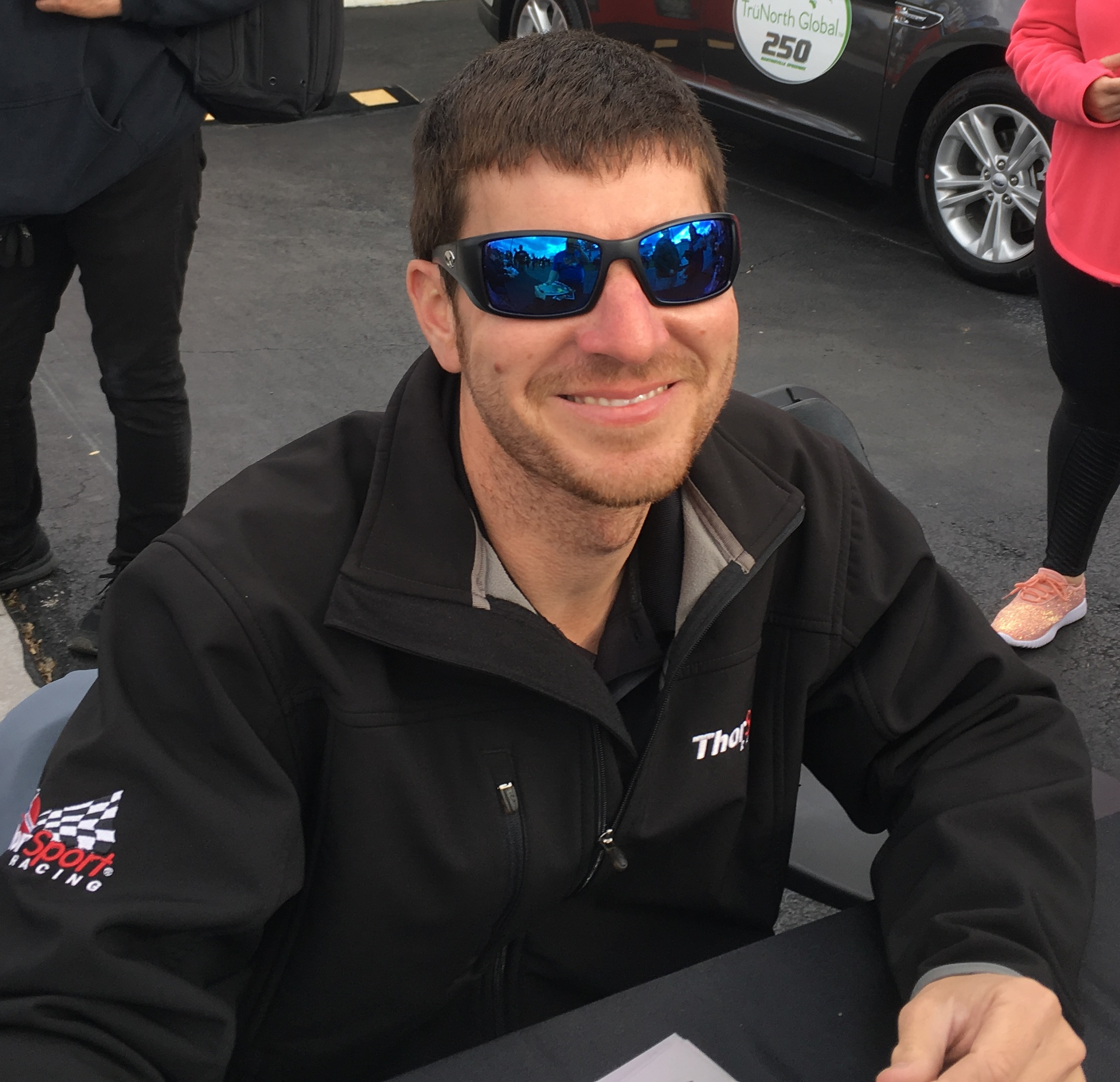
Grant Enfinger finished fourth in the championship.

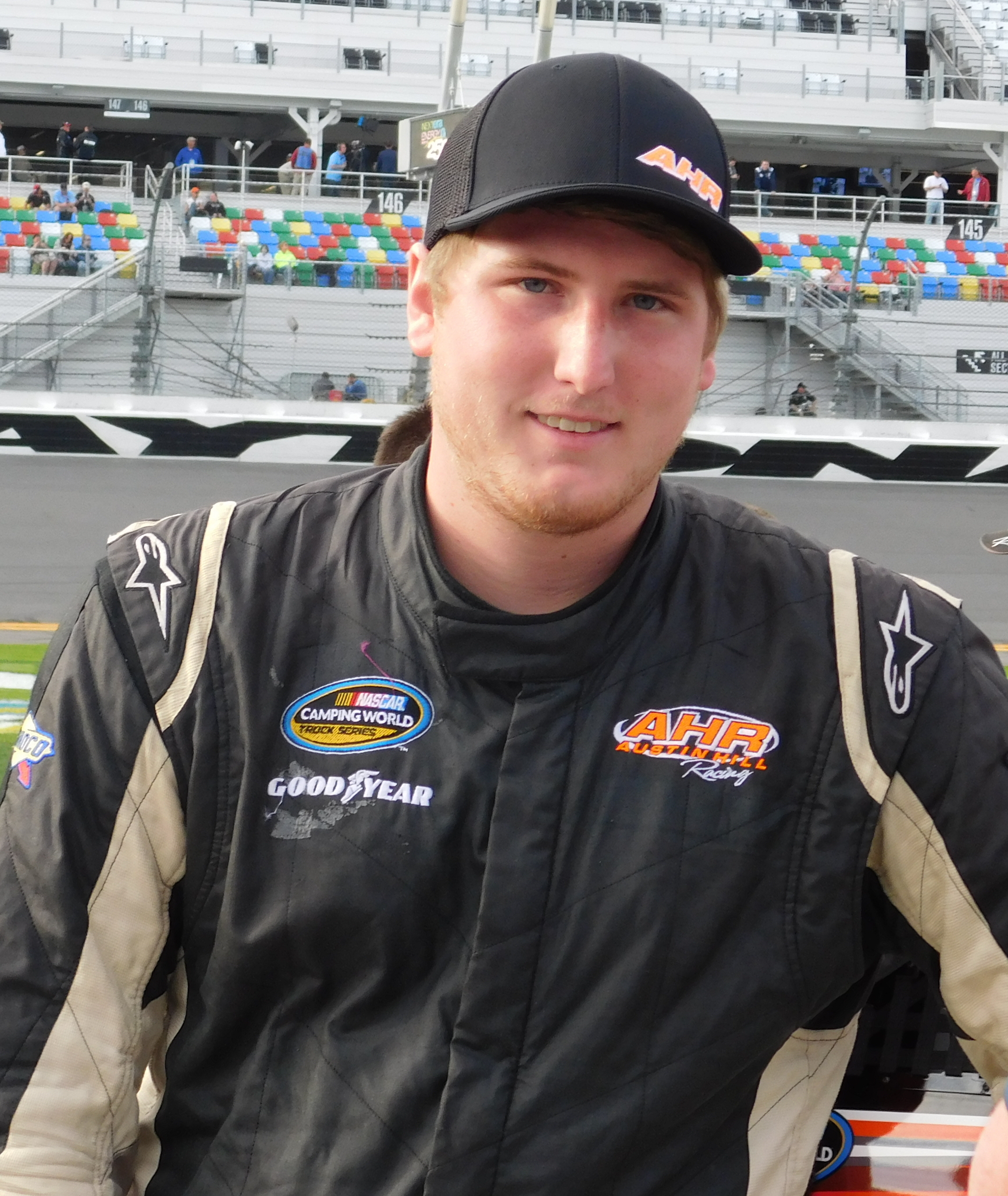
Austin Hill won the Regular Season Championship, but finished sixth in the playoffs.

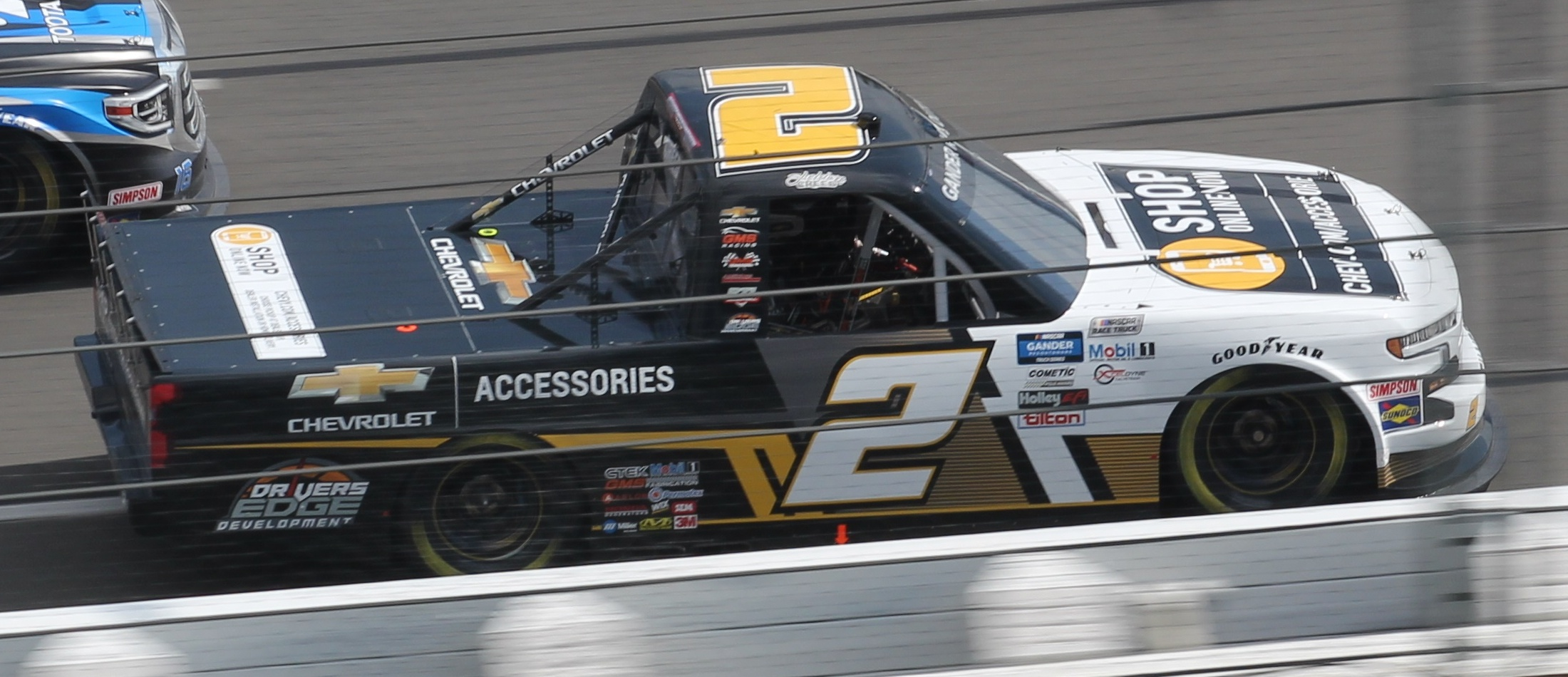
Chevrolet won the Manufacturer's championship.

The 2020 NASCAR Gander RV & Outdoors Truck Series was the 26th season of the pickup truck racing series sanctioned by NASCAR. The season began at Daytona International Speedway with the NextEra Energy 250 on February 14. The regular season ended with the ToyotaCare 250 at Richmond Raceway on September 10. The NASCAR playoffs ended with the Lucas Oil 150 at Phoenix Raceway on November 6, where Sheldon Creed won the championship over his teammates Zane Smith and Brett Moffitt in a 1-2-3 sweep for GMS Racing in the standings. ThorSport Racing driver Grant Enfinger finished fourth in the standings, the other driver to advance to the Championship 4. Austin Hill won the regular season championship and was the points leader for most of the season, but failed to advance to the Championship 4 and finished 6th in the standings.

== Background ==
2020 marked the twelfth season for Camping World Holdings as the series' sponsor, with it being the second season under the Gander RV & Outdoors brand. In September 2019, Camping World announced a rebranding of Gander Outdoors stores as part of a shift in strategy, resulting in the stores also carrying recreational vehicle sales and service, henceforth the slight name change to reflect corporate changes. On September 15, 2020, it was announced that the series title sponsor would switch back to the Camping World brand beginning in 2021.

The early season was headlined by incentives for any driver to beat Kyle Busch in four of the races he participated in. After Busch won the race at Las Vegas, the first of his five Truck starts in 2020, which was his seventh series start in a row where he won, Kevin Harvick and Gander RV & Outdoors CEO Marcus Lemonis each offered $50,000 for any full-time Cup Series regular if they were to finish higher than Busch in his remaining four starts of the year. The challenge spurred Cup drivers Chase Elliott and Erik Jones to run Truck races in an attempt to win the $100,000 bounty. Later, Halmar Friesen Racing owner Chris Larsen announced he would offer a different $50,000 bounty to any Truck Series regular who were to finish ahead of Busch in the upcoming races he would be competing in. Elliott would immediately beat Busch and win the bounty at Charlotte, which was the first race it was on the line. He donated half the prize money to Feed the Children, a quarter of it to the American Red Cross, and another quarter of it to Kyle and Samantha Busch's Bundle of Joy Foundation.

When the season was put on hold due to the COVID-19 pandemic, drivers from all NASCAR series, including many Truck Series drivers, participated in the inaugural eNASCAR iRacing Pro Invitational Series during that time.

== Teams and drivers ==
=== Complete schedule ===
Manufacturer	Team	No.	Race driver	Crew chief
Chevrolet	AM Racing	22	Austin Wayne Self	Eddie Troconis 19; Ryan Salomon 4
Chevrolet	GMS Racing	2	Sheldon Creed	Jeff Stankiewicz
Chevrolet	GMS Racing	21	Zane Smith (R)	Kevin Manion
Chevrolet	GMS Racing	23	Brett Moffitt	Chad Norris
Chevrolet	GMS Racing	26	Tyler Ankrum	Chad Walter
Chevrolet	Hill Motorsports	56	Gus Dean 2 (Note: Entries were fielded in a collaboration with Win-Tron Racing.)	Jamie Jones
Chevrolet	Hill Motorsports	56	Timmy Hill 10	Greg Ely
Chevrolet	Hill Motorsports	56	Tyler Hill 11	Greg Ely
Chevrolet	Jennifer Jo Cobb Racing	10	Jennifer Jo Cobb	Bryan Smith 3 Brian Keselowski 20
Chevrolet	Jordan Anderson Racing	3	Jordan Anderson	Wally Rogers 13; Danny Ketterman Jr. 1 Arthur Haire 7
Chevrolet	Niece Motorsports	40	Ross Chastain 4	Frank Kerr 1 Ryan McKinney 10; Cody Efaw 2 Wally Rogers 10
Chevrolet	Niece Motorsports	40	Garrett Smithley 1	Frank Kerr 1 Ryan McKinney 10; Cody Efaw 2 Wally Rogers 10
Chevrolet	Niece Motorsports	40	Ryan Truex 9	Frank Kerr 1 Ryan McKinney 10; Cody Efaw 2 Wally Rogers 10
Chevrolet	Niece Motorsports	40	T. J. Bell 1	Frank Kerr 1 Ryan McKinney 10; Cody Efaw 2 Wally Rogers 10
Chevrolet	Niece Motorsports	40	Travis Pastrana 1	Frank Kerr 1 Ryan McKinney 10; Cody Efaw 2 Wally Rogers 10
Chevrolet	Niece Motorsports	40	Carson Hocevar 5	Frank Kerr 1 Ryan McKinney 10; Cody Efaw 2 Wally Rogers 10
Chevrolet	Niece Motorsports	40	Trevor Bayne 1	Frank Kerr 1 Ryan McKinney 10; Cody Efaw 2 Wally Rogers 10
Chevrolet	Niece Motorsports	40	Bayley Currey 1	Frank Kerr 1 Ryan McKinney 10; Cody Efaw 2 Wally Rogers 10
Chevrolet	Niece Motorsports	45	Ty Majeski (R) 15	Phil Gould 19; Cody Efaw 2
Chevrolet	Niece Motorsports	45	Trevor Bayne 7	Phil Gould 19; Cody Efaw 2
Chevrolet	Niece Motorsports	45	Travis Pastrana 1	Phil Gould 19; Cody Efaw 2
Chevrolet	Young's Motorsports	02	Tate Fogleman (R)	Chad Kendrick
Chevrolet	Young's Motorsports	20	Spencer Boyd	Joe Lax
Ford	DGR-Crosley	15	Tanner Gray (R)	Shane Wilson
Ford	Front Row Motorsports (Note: Entries were fielded in a collaboration with DGR-Crosley.)	38	Todd Gilliland	Jon Leonard 2 Chris Lawson 21
Ford	ThorSport Racing	13	Johnny Sauter	Joe Shear Jr. 22; Rich Lushes 1
Ford	ThorSport Racing	88	Matt Crafton	Carl Joiner Jr.
Ford	ThorSport Racing	98	Grant Enfinger	Jeff Hensley
Ford	ThorSport Racing	99	Ben Rhodes	Matt Noyce
Toyota	Halmar Friesen Racing	52	Stewart Friesen 22	Tripp Bruce 22; Jon Leonard 1
Toyota	Halmar Friesen Racing	52	Timothy Peters 1	Tripp Bruce 22; Jon Leonard 1
Toyota	Hattori Racing Enterprises	16	Austin Hill	Scott Zipadelli
Toyota	Kyle Busch Motorsports	4	Raphaël Lessard (R)	Mike Hillman Jr.
Toyota	Kyle Busch Motorsports	18	Christian Eckes (R)	Rudy Fugle
Toyota	Kyle Busch Motorsports	51	Riley Herbst 1	Danny Stockman Jr. 21; Wes Ward 2
Toyota	Kyle Busch Motorsports	51	Kyle Busch 5	Danny Stockman Jr. 21; Wes Ward 2
Toyota	Kyle Busch Motorsports	51	Brandon Jones 4	Danny Stockman Jr. 21; Wes Ward 2
Toyota	Kyle Busch Motorsports	51	Chandler Smith 12	Danny Stockman Jr. 21; Wes Ward 2
Toyota	Kyle Busch Motorsports	51	Alex Tagliani 1	Danny Stockman Jr. 21; Wes Ward 2
Toyota	McAnally–Hilgemann Racing	19	Derek Kraus (R)	Kevin Bellicourt
Chevrolet 5 Toyota 18	Reaume Brothers Racing	00	Angela Ruch 7	Andrew Abbott 20; Gregory Rayl 3
Chevrolet 5 Toyota 18	Reaume Brothers Racing	00	Josh Reaume 8	Andrew Abbott 20; Gregory Rayl 3
Chevrolet 5 Toyota 18	Reaume Brothers Racing	00	Dawson Cram 1	Andrew Abbott 20; Gregory Rayl 3
Chevrolet 5 Toyota 18	Reaume Brothers Racing	00	Ryan Huff 1	Andrew Abbott 20; Gregory Rayl 3
Chevrolet 5 Toyota 18	Reaume Brothers Racing	00	Bobby Kennedy 1	Andrew Abbott 20; Gregory Rayl 3
Chevrolet 5 Toyota 18	Reaume Brothers Racing	00	J. J. Yeley 1	Andrew Abbott 20; Gregory Rayl 3
Chevrolet 5 Toyota 18	Reaume Brothers Racing	00	Kyle Donahue 1	Andrew Abbott 20; Gregory Rayl 3
Chevrolet 5 Toyota 18	Reaume Brothers Racing	00	Josh Bilicki 2	Andrew Abbott 20; Gregory Rayl 3
Chevrolet 5 Toyota 18	Reaume Brothers Racing	00	Jason White 1	Andrew Abbott 20; Gregory Rayl 3
Chevrolet 6 Toyota 17	Reaume Brothers Racing	33	Jason White 1	John Reaume
Chevrolet 6 Toyota 17	Reaume Brothers Racing	33	Josh Reaume 4	Gregory Rayl 11; Josh Reaume 4 Andrew Abbott 2 Matthew Wolper 5
Chevrolet 6 Toyota 17	Reaume Brothers Racing	33	Jesse Iwuji 4	Gregory Rayl 11; Josh Reaume 4 Andrew Abbott 2 Matthew Wolper 5
Chevrolet 6 Toyota 17	Reaume Brothers Racing	33	Gray Gaulding 2	Gregory Rayl 11; Josh Reaume 4 Andrew Abbott 2 Matthew Wolper 5
Chevrolet 6 Toyota 17	Reaume Brothers Racing	33	Bryant Barnhill 4	Gregory Rayl 11; Josh Reaume 4 Andrew Abbott 2 Matthew Wolper 5
Chevrolet 6 Toyota 17	Reaume Brothers Racing	33	Akinori Ogata 2	Gregory Rayl 11; Josh Reaume 4 Andrew Abbott 2 Matthew Wolper 5
Chevrolet 6 Toyota 17	Reaume Brothers Racing	33	Kevin Donahue 2	Gregory Rayl 11; Josh Reaume 4 Andrew Abbott 2 Matthew Wolper 5
Chevrolet 6 Toyota 17	Reaume Brothers Racing	33	Bryan Collyer 1	Gregory Rayl 11; Josh Reaume 4 Andrew Abbott 2 Matthew Wolper 5
Chevrolet 6 Toyota 17	Reaume Brothers Racing	33	Josh Bilicki 2	Gregory Rayl 11; Josh Reaume 4 Andrew Abbott 2 Matthew Wolper 5
Chevrolet 6 Toyota 17	Reaume Brothers Racing	33	B. J. McLeod 1	Gregory Rayl 11; Josh Reaume 4 Andrew Abbott 2 Matthew Wolper 5
Toyota	Reaume Brothers Racing	24	Josh Reaume 1	Gregory Rayl
Chevrolet	Reaume Brothers Racing	24	Josh Bilicki 1	John Reaume
Chevrolet	GMS Racing (Note: GMS Racing bought the owners points from the No. 34 Reaume Brothers Racing team to their new entry, the No. 24, in order to be locked into the North Carolina Education Lottery 200 at Charlotte and beyond.)	24	Chase Elliott 3	Charles Denike
Chevrolet	GMS Racing	24	Chase Purdy 7	Charles Denike
Chevrolet	GMS Racing	24	Justin Haley 1	Charles Denike
Chevrolet	GMS Racing	24	David Gravel 2	Charles Denike
Chevrolet	GMS Racing	24	Kris Wright 1	Charles Denike
Chevrolet	GMS Racing	24	Sam Mayer 6	Charles Denike
Chevrolet	GMS Racing	24	Greg Biffle 1	Charles Denike

=== Limited schedule ===
Manufacturer	Team	No.	Race driver	Crew chief	Rounds
Chevrolet	CMI Motorsports	49	Bayley Currey	Wesley Hopkins 12; Jerry Miller 2 Tim Silva 3 Matt Cooper 2	3
Chevrolet	CMI Motorsports	49	Tim Viens	Wesley Hopkins 12; Jerry Miller 2 Tim Silva 3 Matt Cooper 2	5
Chevrolet	CMI Motorsports	49	Roger Reuse	Wesley Hopkins 12; Jerry Miller 2 Tim Silva 3 Matt Cooper 2	2 (Note: Entries were fielded in a collaboration with Jordan Anderson Racing.)
Chevrolet	CMI Motorsports	49	Tyler Hill	Wesley Hopkins 12; Jerry Miller 2 Tim Silva 3 Matt Cooper 2	1 (Note: Entry was fielded in a collaboration with Hill Motorsports.)
Chevrolet	CMI Motorsports	49	Ray Ciccarelli	Wesley Hopkins 12; Jerry Miller 2 Tim Silva 3 Matt Cooper 2	9
Chevrolet	CMI Motorsports	83	Ray Ciccarelli	Tim Silva 10; Wesley Hopkins 1	4
Chevrolet	CMI Motorsports	83	Stefan Parsons	Tim Silva 10; Wesley Hopkins 1	1
Chevrolet	CMI Motorsports	83	T. J. Bell	Tim Silva 10; Wesley Hopkins 1	2
Chevrolet	CMI Motorsports	83	Tim Viens	Tim Silva 10; Wesley Hopkins 1	5
Chevrolet	CR7 Motorsports	9	Codie Rohrbaugh	Doug George 16; Mark Huff 1	17
Chevrolet	Cram Racing Enterprises	41	Dawson Cram	Kevin Cram	8
Chevrolet	Cram Racing Enterprises	41	Ryan Huff	Kevin Cram	1
Chevrolet	Cram Racing Enterprises	41	Cody Erickson	Kevin Cram	1
Chevrolet	Diversified Motorsports Enterprises	97	Jesse Little	Bruce Cook	3
Chevrolet	Diversified Motorsports Enterprises	97	Robby Lyons	Bruce Cook	5
Chevrolet	FDNY Racing	28	Bryan Dauzat	Jim Rosenblum	7
Chevrolet	Henderson Motorsports	75	Parker Kligerman	Chris Carrier	10
Chevrolet	Long Motorsports	55	Dawson Cram	Kevin Cram 5 Brian Keselowski 1	6
Chevrolet	Mike Affarano Motorsports	03	Tim Viens	David McClure	3
Chevrolet	Niece Motorsports	42	Ross Chastain	Cody Efaw 6 Kevin Eagle 1 Phil Gould 2	4
Chevrolet	Niece Motorsports	42	Mark Smith	Cody Efaw 6 Kevin Eagle 1 Phil Gould 2	1
Chevrolet	Niece Motorsports	42	Conor Daly	Cody Efaw 6 Kevin Eagle 1 Phil Gould 2	1
Chevrolet	Niece Motorsports	42	James Buescher	Cody Efaw 6 Kevin Eagle 1 Phil Gould 2	1
Chevrolet	Niece Motorsports	42	Carson Hocevar	Cody Efaw 6 Kevin Eagle 1 Phil Gould 2	2
Chevrolet	Niece Motorsports	44	Natalie Decker	Paul Clapprood	14
Chevrolet	Niece Motorsports	44	Jeb Burton	Paul Clapprood	2
Chevrolet	Niece Motorsports	44	Ross Chastain	Paul Clapprood	1
Chevrolet	Niece Motorsports	44	Bayley Currey	Paul Clapprood	3
Chevrolet	Niece Motorsports	44	Kaz Grala	Paul Clapprood	1
Chevrolet	Niece Motorsports	44	Colin Garrett	Paul Clapprood	1
Chevrolet	Norm Benning Racing	6	Norm Benning	Bill Johnson 6 John Vullo 12	20
Chevrolet	Peck Motorsports	96	Todd Peck	Keith Wolfe	1
Chevrolet	Trey Hutchens Racing	14	Trey Hutchens	Bobby Hutchens Jr.	5
Ford	NEMCO Motorsports	87	Joe Nemechek	Duke Whiseant	1
Ford	Roper Racing	04	Cory Roper	Shane Whitbeck	12
Ford	DGR-Crosley	17	David Ragan	Blake Bainbridge 2 Marcus Richmond 4 Derek Smith 1	4
Ford	DGR-Crosley	17	Dylan Lupton	Blake Bainbridge 2 Marcus Richmond 4 Derek Smith 1	3
Ford	DGR-Crosley	17	Hailie Deegan	Drew Blickensderfer	1
Toyota	All Out Motorsports	17	Korbin Forrister	Danny Gill 6 Richard Mason 4	1 (Note: It was an All Out Motorsports entry using DGR-Crosley's owners points.)
Toyota	All Out Motorsports	7	Korbin Forrister	Danny Gill 6 Richard Mason 4	9
Toyota	Clay Greenfield Motorsports	68	Clay Greenfield	Jeff Hammond	20
Toyota	On Point Motorsports	30	Brennan Poole	Rick Markle 7 Steven Lane 15	11
Toyota	On Point Motorsports	30	Scott Lagasse Jr.	Rick Markle 7 Steven Lane 15	1
Toyota	On Point Motorsports	30	Danny Bohn	Rick Markle 7 Steven Lane 15	10
Toyota	Spencer Davis Motorsports	11	Spencer Davis (R)	Michael Shelton 1 Mark Rette 14	15
Toyota	Wauters Motorsports (Note: Entry was fielded in a collaboration with Billy Ballew and James Finch.)	5	Erik Jones	Richie Wauters	1
Ford 5 Chevrolet 2	NEMCO Motorsports	8	John Hunter Nemechek	Gere Kennon Jr. 3 Duke Whiseant 4	4
Ford 5 Chevrolet 2	NEMCO Motorsports	8	Mike Skeen	Gere Kennon Jr. 3 Duke Whiseant 4	1
Ford 5 Chevrolet 2	NEMCO Motorsports	8	Camden Murphy	Gere Kennon Jr. 3 Duke Whiseant 4	1
Ford 5 Chevrolet 2	NEMCO Motorsports	8	Joe Nemechek	Gere Kennon Jr. 3 Duke Whiseant 4	1
Toyota 2 Chevrolet 1	Reaume Brothers Racing	34	Bryant Barnhill	John Reaume 1 Gregory Rayl 1 Matthew Wolper 1	3

=== Changes ===
==== Teams ====
- On October 31, 2019, Kyle Busch confirmed on NASCAR America that Kyle Busch Motorsports will run two trucks full-time for the championship, as well as another truck for a rotating cast of drivers, including himself and Chandler Smith. On November 14, Canadian Raphaël Lessard, and 2019 ARCA Menards Series champion Christian Eckes were announced for both full-time entries, with both also competing for Rookie of the Year.
- After running two trucks full-time in 2019, GMS Racing will expand to four full-time trucks in 2020 with the addition of Tyler Ankrum from DGR-Crosley and Zane Smith from JR Motorsports in the Xfinity Series. They will also run a fifth truck part-time for Sam Mayer as well as World of Outlaws driver David Gravel (in one race), and Hendrick Motorsports Cup Series driver Chase Elliott (three). The truck number for the fifth truck was confirmed to be the No. 24 on January 10, 2020. Ankrum's new team, the No. 26, was revealed to be using the owner points from Moffitt's No. 24 truck in 2019. As a result, Moffitt's renumbered No. 23 truck started the year with no owner points. However, Moffitt, the 2018 Truck Series champion, is eligible to use the champion's provisional to lock himself into races.
- On December 20, 2019, Diversified Motorsports Enterprises completed its purchase of JJL Motorsports. As a result, the owner points of the JJL No. 97 were transferred to DME.
- On January 13, 2020, Front Row Motorsports announced their expansion into the Truck Series through an alliance with DGR-Crosley. They will field the No. 38 Ford F-150, which inherits its owner points from DGR-Crosley's No. 54 team.
- On January 13, 2020, Bill McAnally Racing announced a partnership with Bill Hilgemann, renaming their Truck Series team McAnally–Hilgemann Racing to reflect his co-ownership. In addition, the team has formed a technical alliance with Hattori Racing Enterprises.
- On January 21, 2020, Win-Tron Racing announced their return to the Truck Series, with them fielding the No. 32 Chevrolet part-time for Howie DiSavino III (one of their ARCA drivers). Excluding a partnership with AM Racing in 2016 and 2017, this will be Win-Tron's first time in the series since 2015, when they ran the No. 35 Toyota. In addition to that effort, Win-Tron partnered with the Hill Motorsports No. 56 team to jointly field Gus Dean, one of their ARCA drivers, at Daytona.
- On January 29, 2020, when it was announced that Angela Ruch would be driving full-time for Reaume Brothers Racing, it was revealed that her truck number would be the No. 00, a new number for RBR. The No. 00 was previously the No. 34 team, with the part-time No. 32 in 2019 becoming the No. 34 for 2020. Despite these number changes, it was revealed on February 3, 2020, that the No. 00 would use the 2019 owner points from the No. 12 Young's Motorsports team, which was not run full-time in 2020. The No. 34 will use the owner points from last season's No. 34 team instead of the old No. 32.
- On February 3, 2020, Bob Pockrass reported the owner points of the DGR-Crosley No. 17 would be transferred to the No. 15 in 2020, which meant that the No. 15 would be the team's primary truck this season and the No. 17 would not be fielded full-time.
- On February 5, 2020, Jordan Anderson Racing, AM Racing, and Win-Tron Racing announced they would all be sharing a race shop and resources this season. It is the former Front Row Motorsports shop in Statesville, North Carolina. Despite this partnership, the three teams are not merging into one.
- On February 15, 2020 (the day after the season-opener at Daytona), it was mentioned in a Frontstretch article that the NEMCO Motorsports No. 8 truck would only be running part-time in 2020 and would be skipping the second race of the year at Las Vegas. In 2019, the truck ran with multiple drivers after John Hunter Nemechek's move to the Xfinity Series full-time, including Angela Ruch (before she left for Niece Motorsports), Tony Mrakovich and Trey Hutchens (who moved over to NEMCO after DNQ's with their own teams), Camden Murphy, as well as both John Hunter and Joe Nemechek in a few races each. NEMCO also sold the No. 8's owner points from 2019 to the No. 21 GMS Racing truck of Zane Smith before the start of the season.
- On February 18, 2020, it was revealed through the Atlanta entry list that Rette Jones Racing's Truck Series team, the No. 11, would be owned by their driver, Spencer Davis instead in 2020 under the name Spencer Davis Motorsports. The team has a partnership with Sam Hunt Racing and bought the owner points from KBM's part-time No. 46 truck, and with that truck's crew chief, Michael Shelton, becoming the No. 11 SDM crew chief for the 2020 season. It is unclear how many races the team plans to run, however, Davis did register for rookie of the year in 2020.
- On February 20, 2020, it was announced that CMI Motorsports would be fielding a second truck, the No. 83, for the first time at Las Vegas with Stefan Parsons driving it. On May 25, 2020, it was announced that T. J. Bell would drive the No. 83 at Charlotte.
- On March 3, 2020, it was announced that both former Truck Series teams Billy Ballew Motorsports and Wauters Motorsports as well as former Cup Series team Phoenix Racing would jointly be restarted and returning to the series with Erik Jones running at Homestead as he seeks the Kyle Busch $100,000 bounty. However, Ballew stated the team has no plans to return besides the one race. Following the postponement of the Homestead race due to the COVID-19 pandemic, Jones was announced to compete at Charlotte.
- On May 20, 2020, Niece Motorsports announced the debut of a fourth truck for the team, the No. 42, which will be driven by Ross Chastain at Charlotte.
- On May 26, 2020, it had been announced that Clauson-Marshall Racing, a dirt racing team, would be making their first attempt in NASCAR, partnering with Niece Motorsports to field 2-time USAC champion Tyler Courtney in one of Niece's trucks for the dirt race at Eldora before the race was cancelled as part of the COVID-19 schedule changes.

==== Drivers ====
- On July 1, 2019, Toyota Racing executive Jack Irving Jr. stated that Hailie Deegan could run some Truck Series races in 2020. Deegan's name was in the mix to be joining DGR-Crosley, whom she had run one East Series race for in 2019. On December 17, Ford Performance announced the addition of Deegan to its driver development program. Deegan's father Brian stated that she will focus on the ARCA Menards Series in 2020 before tentatively moving to the Truck Series in 2021 and the Xfinity Series in 2023. On October 7, Deegan announced that she would make her first Truck start at the 2020 Clean Harbors 200 at Kansas, driving the DGR-Crosley No. 17 truck.
- On November 14, 2019, it was announced that 2019 Rookie of the Year Tyler Ankrum would join GMS Racing from DGR-Crosley and would drive a third full-time truck for them, which was later decided to be the No. 26.
- On November 19, 2019, it was announced that GMS Racing would also add a fourth full-time truck in 2020 with Zane Smith driving, who last year ran a part-time schedule in the Xfinity Series for JR Motorsports, which is aligned with GMS as part of the Drivers Edge Development program and it was later revealed he would be driving the No. 21 truck.
- On November 21, 2019, it was announced that Myatt Snider, who drove for ThorSport Racing for two years (full-time in 2018 in the No. 13 and part-time in 2019 in the No. 27), would be moving up to the Xfinity Series in 2020, running a part-time schedule for Richard Childress Racing. It was also confirmed on December 3, 2019 that Anthony Alfredo, who drove part-time for DGR-Crosley in 2019 (mostly in the No. 15 truck), would join Snider at RCR in the Xfinity Series for a part-time schedule as well.
- On November 24, 2019, it was announced that Tim Viens rented out a ride with Mike Affarano Motorsports to drive their No. 03 for the NextEra Energy 250 at Daytona International Speedway. On January 15, 2020, the team again posted on their Facebook page saying that Viens would attempt the whole season in the No. 03 with sponsorship from the Patriots PAC of America (for President Donald Trump's re-election campaign), though the odds of them being able to make it to every race was minimal. The team was on the entry list for Daytona, but on the way to the track, their hauler got stuck in a ditch due to icy roads and they had to withdraw.
- On December 10, 2019, it was announced that Ty Majeski would join Niece Motorsports full-time in 2020, replacing Ross Chastain. Majeski previously piloted the organization's No. 44 entry at Phoenix Raceway in November 2019.
- On December 11, 2019, it was announced that Brennan Poole, who drove most of the Truck Series schedule for On Point Motorsports in 2019, would be running full-time in the Cup Series driving the No. 15 for Premium Motorsports in 2020. However, he still ran Daytona for the team.
- On December 16, 2019, DGR-Crosley announced that Tanner Gray would drive the No. 15 Ford full-time in 2020.
- On December 18, 2019, Ross Chastain announced on a video that he would be back to run some races with Niece Motorsports again in 2020, likely in the No. 44 and sharing that truck with multiple drivers.
- On December 18, 2019, Henderson Motorsports announced that they planned to enter some races with other drivers in addition to Parker Kligerman in 2020.
- On December 20, 2019, Niece Motorsports announced that Carson Hocevar would drive for them in nine races in 2020, which came in the team's part-time No. 40 truck, which was previously the No. 38 until Front Row Motorsports took that number for their new Truck team. Hocevar ran two Truck races last year for Jordan Anderson Racing as well as part-time in ARCA for the last two years with KBR Development.
- On January 2, 2020, Bobby Gerhart announced that he has decided to not drive this season after suffering a heart attack on Christmas. However, he did say that he would still like to field his team at Daytona with another driver in his Truck and ARCA rides. The Gerhart team ended up not even entering either race with someone else driving.
- On January 10, 2020, GMS Racing announced that World of Outlaws driver David Gravel would drive six races in the No. 24 Chevrolet, with Eldora being the only one of which is confirmed at this time.
- On January 13, 2020, it was announced that Todd Gilliland would drive the Front Row Motorsports No. 38 truck in 2020.
- On January 13, 2020, defending West Series champion Derek Kraus was announced as the driver for the No. 19 McAnally–Hilgemann Racing Toyota in 2020. He drove that truck part-time in 2019 as well as running full-time for McAnally in what is now the ARCA Menards Series West.
- On January 16, 2020, Niece Motorsports announced that Natalie Decker would be driving their No. 44 truck in eight races. In 2019, she drove all but four races of the season in the DGR-Crosley No. 54, a truck that will not be fielded in 2020. Decker was forced to miss the Pocono race after being hospitalized on June 23 for bile duct complications that resulted from her gallbladder surgery in December 2019. On September 25, Decker was not medically cleared to race at Las Vegas after experiencing a high heart rate and high blood pressure; because her truck had cleared inspection and was placed on the starting grid, she was credited with a last-place finish in the race.
- On January 21, 2020, it was announced that Howie DiSavino III, who drove for Win-Tron Racing part-time in the ARCA Menards Series in 2019, would do the same in 2020 but also run some truck races for the team, making their return to the series for the first time since 2015. He was to drive a No. 32 truck with his debut coming at the new Richmond race, but the team ended up not attempting the race after it was rescheduled from May to September due to COVID-19.
- On January 27, 2020, Young's Motorsports announced that Tate Fogleman would drive the team's flagship truck, the No. 02, full-time, replacing Tyler Dippel. He drove part-time for the team in 2018, but did not run any races for them or with any other team in the series in 2019.
- On January 29, 2020, Angela Ruch announced she would run the full schedule in the No. 00 Chevrolet for Reaume Brothers Racing.
- On January 30, CMI Motorsports announced that Bayley Currey had joined the team and would drive the team's No. 49 at Las Vegas. Currey's start will be in addition to team owner-driver Ray Ciccarelli's races with the team. Currey would also drive for the team at Charlotte as well.
- On February 6, 2020, Niece Motorsports announced that Super Late Model driver Jett Noland will drive the No. 44 Chevrolet in six races.
- After Kyle Busch's win in the race at Las Vegas, Kevin Harvick tweeted on February 22, 2020 that he would personally award $50,000 to any full-time Cup Series driver who entered any number of the remaining four races of Busch's Truck schedule and would win the race over him without purposely crashing him out to do so. Soon after, Marcus Lemonis, the CEO of the series title sponsor, Gander RV & Outdoors, announced he would match Harvick's money for a total of an $100,000 payout. Several drivers, including Denny Hamlin, Corey LaJoie, Austin Dillon, and Clint Bowyer expressed interest in entering if they could find rides. The first two drivers to officially announce participation in the challenge were Chase Elliott, who was announced to run at Atlanta and Kansas, and Kyle Larson, who was announced to run at Homestead, both in the GMS Racing No. 24. The pandemic, however, affected the schedule, as all three races were postponed, forcing the schedule to be changed. After Larson was suspended for uttering a racial slur in an iRacing event held during the pandemic break, he was replaced by Elliott in his scheduled start at Homestead. Because Kyle Busch would reschedule his start at Kansas (which was moved to July) to the Charlotte race in May, Elliott would also instead compete at Charlotte.
- On May 20, 2020, Garrett Smithley was announced as the driver of the Niece Motorsports No. 40 truck at Charlotte.
- On August 3, 2020, GMS Racing announced that Kris Wright would drive the No. 24 Chevrolet at the Daytona Road Course.
- On August 13, 2020, it was announced that Dawson Cram would be leaving Long Motorsports, after having competed for the team part-time throughout the season, including at Michigan, where he scored a 14th-place finish. He and his family ended up buying Long Motorsports to form their own team, Cram Racing Enterprises, who he would drive for the remainder of the season.
- On October 4, 2020, Stewart Friesen announced he would skip the race at Kansas in October after the race was moved from Friday to Saturday of that week, as it conflicted with a prior commitment to compete in the Short Track Super Series "Speed Showcase" 200 at Port Royal Speedway. Halmar Friesen Racing initially announced Christopher Bell as his substitute driver in the No. 52 Toyota, but because it was a playoff race, Cup Series drivers such as Bell were ineligible to compete in it. The team would then announce on October 9 that Timothy Peters would instead substitute for Friesen.
- On October 16, 2020, it was announced that 2012 series champion James Buescher would return to NASCAR after being without a ride for over five years, driving one of the Niece Motorsports trucks in the October race at his home track of Texas.

==== Crew chiefs ====
- On November 20, 2019, it was confirmed that Jerry Baxter, the crew chief of the No. 24 (now the No. 23) truck, had left GMS Racing after the 2019 season. He will be working for Richard Petty Motorsports as the crew chief for Bubba Wallace and the No. 43 team in the Cup Series in 2020.
- On December 11, 2019, Kyle Busch Motorsports announced their 2020 crew chief lineup. Rudy Fugle will be in charge of the No. 18 Toyota of Christian Eckes, Mike Hillman Jr. will handle the No. 4 truck of Raphaël Lessard, and former Richard Childress Racing crew chief Danny Stockman Jr. will lead the No. 51 team driven by Kyle Busch, Chandler Smith, and other drivers to be announced at a later date.
- On December 13, 2019, GMS Racing announced their crew chief lineup for the 2020 season. Chad Norris has been named crew chief for Brett Moffitt and the No. 23 Chevrolet team, Chad Walter will lead Tyler Ankrum and the No. 26 team, Kevin Manion will call the shots for Zane Smith who will drive the No. 21 entry, and Jeff Stankiewicz will remain as the crew chief for the No. 2 team piloted by Sheldon Creed.
- On January 13, 2020, Jon Leonard was named the crew chief for Front Row Motorsports' new truck team with Todd Gilliland. Last year, he worked as an engineer for Richard Childress Racing. Prior to that, he was at Leavine Family Racing, where he was also the interim crew chief for their No. 95 car for over half of the 2018 Cup Series season with drivers Kasey Kahne and Regan Smith.
- On January 15, 2020, it was announced that Shane Wilson would be the crew chief for the No. 15 team of DGR-Crosley and rookie Tanner Gray. Wilson crew chiefed Ryan Sieg and his No. 39 Xfinity Series team in 2019, leading him to having many good runs and a playoff spot.
- On January 28, 2020, Clay Greenfield Motorsports announced that Fox NASCAR commentator Jeff Hammond would come out of retirement and be the crew chief of their No. 68 Toyota. Hammond's career as a crew chief dates back to 1982, when he helped Darrell Waltrip win his second Cup Series championship.
- On February 11, 2020, several more crew chief changes for the 2020 season were revealed through the release of the Daytona entry list.
  - Joe Lax replaced Buddy Sisco as Spencer Boyd's crew chief on the No. 20 truck for Young's Motorsports. In 2019, he was the crew chief for Ray Ciccarelli's No. 49 CMI Motorsports truck, where he led the underdog team to a top-10 finish at Michigan.
  - Replacing Lax at CMI was rookie crew chief Wesley Hopkins.
  - Paul Clapprood replaced Kevin Eagle as the crew chief of the No. 44 for Niece Motorsports. He was the crew chief for the JD Motorsports No. 4 in the Xfinity Series in 2019, where he worked with a multitude of drivers, including Ross Chastain, who also drives for Niece part-time in Trucks.
  - Frank Kerr replaced Niece Motorsports team manager Cody Efaw as the crew chief of the team's part-time No. 40 (formerly No. 38) truck. Kerr worked for DGR-Crosley in 2019 as the crew chief for their No. 54 truck driven by Natalie Decker. However, he lost his job with DGR after they closed down the No. 54 team. Decker is also at Niece this season driving one of their other trucks, the No. 44.
  - Rick Markle replaced On Point Motorsports team owner Steven Lane as the crew chief of that team's No. 30 truck. The last time he was a crew chief was for one of the cars of the closed JGL Racing team in the Xfinity Series in 2018. Lane was also working for JGL at the time, and the two are reunited again.
  - Andrew Abbott is the new crew chief for the No. 00 Reaume Brothers Racing truck of Angela Ruch. However, it is unclear if he will remain in that position for the entirety of the season, given he is also the crew chief of Jeremy Clements's No. 51 Xfinity Series team.
  - Bill Johnson, another rookie crew chief, replaced Brian Poff as Norm Benning's crew chief for the 2020 season. This continues the trend of the past few years where Benning has had a new crew chief at the start of each year. Johnson, however, would pass away partway through the 2020 season. He was replaced by John Vullo.
  - Bryan Smith, the former owner of the closed TriStar Motorsports team which competed in the Cup and Xfinity Series through 2018, has replaced Tim Silva as Jennifer Jo Cobb's crew chief this season. Silva joined CMI Motorsports and would be the crew chief of their new second truck, the No. 83.
- On February 27, 2020, GMS Racing announced that the crew chief for their part-time No. 24 truck would be Charles Denike, who is usually an engineer for the team. Denike has crew chiefed for GMS in the past with their former part-time Xfinity Series No. 96 car driven by Ben Kennedy in 2017.

==== Interim crew chiefs ====
- Prior to the Chevrolet Silverado 250 at Talladega on October 3, 2020, Halmar Friesen Racing No. 52 crew chief Tripp Bruce was suspended for the race and the team was docked 20 points for a truck bed cover vent hole rule violation during pre-race inspection. HFR engineer Jon Leonard took over as interim crew chief for Stewart Friesen in the race.
- Prior to the Chevrolet Silverado 250 at Talladega on October 3, 2020, CR7 Motorsports No. 9 crew chief Doug George was suspended for the race and the team was docked 20 points for a truck bed cover vent hole rule violation during pre-race inspection. CR7 truck chief and hauler driver Mark Huff took over as interim crew chief for Codie Rohrbaugh in the race.
- After the No. 51 Kyle Busch Motorsports truck had a loose wheel during one of their pit stops in the SpeedyCash.com 400 at Texas on October 25, 2020, crew chief Danny Stockman Jr. was suspended for three races, and Wes Ward filled in as crew chief for the team in the final two races of the season.

==== Manufacturers ====
- On December 3, 2019, it was announced that the No. 52 Halmar Friesen Racing team would switch from Chevrolet and an alliance with GMS Racing to Toyota and an alliance with Kyle Busch Motorsports starting in 2020.
- On December 11, 2019, DGR-Crosley announced that they would be switching from Toyota to Ford beginning in 2020.
- On January 24, 2020, it was revealed through a paint scheme of one of the team's trucks for this season that Diversified Motorsports Enterprises (formerly JJL Motorsports) would be switching from Ford to Chevrolet this season, likely because driver Jesse Little is driving full-time for JD Motorsports, a Chevrolet team, in the NASCAR Xfinity Series. Also, the crew chief of the team is Bruce Cook, who is the owner of Cook-Finley Racing, a former Truck series team that fielded Chevy trucks in the year before. DME and Cook-Finley Racing also share the same shop.
- On February 11, 2020, it was revealed through the Daytona entry list that NEMCO Motorsports would switch from Chevrolet to Ford starting this season due to John Hunter Nemechek driving for Front Row Motorsports, a Ford team, in the Cup Series. However, the No. 8 truck would still be a Chevrolet when Mike Skeen and Camden Murphy drove it in each of their starts.

==== Sponsorship restrictions ====
- On December 2, 2019, NASCAR announced that the organization will not allow CBD sponsorships partly due to restrictions from its media rights partners and also because of FIA regulations (cannabinoids, which CBD is part, is a Prohibited Substance in the WADA Code that is used by the FIA; NASCAR is a member of the ASN of the FIA in the United States, the Automobile Competition Committee for the United States).

== Rule changes ==
- Similar to 2019, NASCAR Cup Series drivers will only be allowed to compete in five races. Cup drivers also are not allowed to compete in the Triple Truck Challenge as well as the final eight races of the season (the final race before the playoffs and the NASCAR playoffs). Unlike 2019, the rule now applies to drivers declaring for Cup Series points with three or more years of Cup Series experience, down from five years of experience in 2019. Another change from 2019 is that the entry deadline requirement for the Triple Truck Challenge eligibility has been removed, which prevented Greg Biffle from being eligible for the bonus money from the other two Triple Truck Challenge races after winning the first leg in Texas last year. So starting in 2020, the entire field will be vying for the bonus each week.
- NASCAR also decided to expand the Truck Series playoff to 10 drivers instead of 8 that were in the years before. Now the structure will be: 3 races in the Round of 10 after which two drivers will be eliminated. 3 races in the Round of 8 with four drivers being eliminated and four drivers will compete for the championship in the season finale.
- Controlled cautions will be used for standalone races (not part of a Cup Series weekend; at Iowa Speedway, World Wide Technology Raceway, and Canadian Tire Motorsport Park). This procedure includes restrictions on tire changes and refueling to prevent teams from hiring specialized pit crews. The controlled caution procedure will not be in effect for weekends where either series is with the Cup Series. The rules are as follows:

- Each team will consist of eight pit crew members. This includes four to service the car, one fueler, and one driver assistant.
- On oval tracks, teams may add fuel and change two tires per pit stop.
- On road courses, teams may add fuel or change four tires per pit stop.
- Restarts under caution will be in the following order:

1. Cars that did not pit.
2. Cars that pitted one time, followed by two times.
3. Free Pass, Wave Around vehicles, Penalty vehicles.

- Teams involved in incidents are allowed to change four tires at once to avoid damaging the vehicle.
- Penalties are as follows:

- A team must restart on the tail end of the lead lap if they exceed the time limit on pit road or they pit other than the designated lap.
- A team must serve a two-lap penalty if they change all four tires and add fuel on any pit stop, change tires under green (unless approved by NASCAR for damage caused by an incident), or perform a four-tire change on any pit stop (Iowa and Gateway only).

=== Changes due to the COVID-19 pandemic ===
In NASCAR's first races back since the pandemic hit, there would be no practice or qualifying held so that teams would not need to bring additional crew members to the track and would not need to bring backup cars. (Crew members would be in contact with each other when repairing a primary car damaged in practice or qualifying or to prepare a backup car if a team had to utilize it).

In the Gander RV & Outdoors Truck Series and Xfinity Series races that will be held without practice and qualifying, NASCAR announced that the field size temporarily will be expanded to a maximum of 40 vehicles each. The field will be set by a random draw, similar to NASCAR Cup Series.

On July 21, NASCAR announced that the remaining national series events on the 2020 schedule will be held without practice and qualifying.

On July 29, NASCAR announced further changes to the controlled caution procedure at World Wide Technology Raceway to make the pit stop rules similar to the original Truck Series rules from 1995 to 1998.

- Lead lap and lapped trucks will be able to pit on the first lap pit lane is open. Typically, lead lap trucks on the first lap, lapped trucks on the second lap.
- Tires may not be changed during the race except for designated stage breaks after Lap 55 and 110 except if tire was flat to avoid damaging the vehicle.
- Trucks may be refueled at any pit stop.
- Teams will have three minutes to conduct a normal pit stop at the stage breaks.
- Restarts will be in the following order:

1. Trucks that did not pit. Lead lap first, then lapped trucks.
2. Trucks that pitted, in order of running order at the time the safety truck was called.
3. Beneficiary
4. Wave Around Trucks
5. Trucks penalised for pit lane infractions, including exceeding the three-minute clock.

- Penalties are as follows:

- A truck must restart on the tail end of the lead lap if they exceed the time limit on pit road or they pit other than the designated lap.
- A team must serve a two-lap penalty if they change tires any time except because of a damaged tire.

== Schedule ==
The schedule for the 2020 season was released on April 3, 2019.

No	Race title	Track	Location	Date
1	NextEra Energy 250	Daytona International Speedway	Daytona Beach, Florida	February 14
2	Strat 200	Las Vegas Motor Speedway	Las Vegas, Nevada	February 21
3	North Carolina Education Lottery 200	Charlotte Motor Speedway	Concord, North Carolina	May 26
4	Vet Tix/Camping World 200	Atlanta Motor Speedway	Hampton, Georgia	June 6
5	Baptist Health 200	Homestead–Miami Speedway	Homestead, Florida	June 13
6	Pocono Organics 150	Pocono Raceway	Long Pond, Pennsylvania	June 28 (Note: The Pocono race was postponed to Sunday, June 28, due to rain.)
7	Buckle Up in Your Truck 225	Kentucky Speedway	Sparta, Kentucky	July 11
8	Vankor 350	Texas Motor Speedway	Fort Worth, Texas	July 18
9	Blue-Emu Maximum Pain Relief 200	Kansas Speedway	Kansas City, Kansas	July 24
10	E.P.T. 200 (Note: Kansas' second race replaced the Chicagoland race, the Camping World 225.)	Kansas Speedway	Kansas City, Kansas	July 25
11	Henry Ford Health System 200	Michigan International Speedway	Cambridge Township, Michigan	August 7
12	**Sunoco 159** (Note: The Daytona Road Course race replaced the Iowa race, the M&M's 200.)	Daytona International Speedway (Road Course)	Daytona Beach, Florida	August 16
13	**KDI Office Technology 200**	Dover International Speedway	Dover, Delaware	August 21
14	**CarShield 200**	World Wide Technology Raceway	Madison, Illinois	August 30
15	South Carolina Education Lottery 200 (Note: The Darlington race replaced the Canadian Tire Motorsport Park race, the Chevrolet Silverado 250.)	Darlington Raceway	Darlington, South Carolina	September 6
16	ToyotaCare 250	Richmond Raceway	Richmond, Virginia	September 10
NASCAR Gander RV & Outdoors Truck Series Playoffs
Round of 10
17	UNOH 200 presented by Ohio Logistics	Bristol Motor Speedway	Bristol, Tennessee	September 17
18	World of Westgate 200	Las Vegas Motor Speedway	Las Vegas, Nevada	September 25
19	Chevrolet Silverado 250	Talladega Superspeedway	Lincoln, Alabama	October 3
Round of 8
20	Clean Harbors 200 (Note: Kansas' third race replaced the Eldora race, the Eldora Dirt Derby.)	Kansas Speedway	Kansas City, Kansas	October 17
21	SpeedyCash.com 400	Texas Motor Speedway	Fort Worth, Texas	October 25
22	NASCAR Hall of Fame 200	Martinsville Speedway	Ridgeway, Virginia	October 30
Championship 4
23	Lucas Oil 150	Phoenix Raceway	Avondale, Arizona	November 6

- Triple Truck Challenge races in **bold**.

Note: On the original schedule, the TTC races were supposed to be Richmond, Dover and Charlotte, but after COVID-19, that was no longer the case. On July 18, 2020, NASCAR announced that the challenge would still be done this season, and would now be at the Daytona Road Course, the rescheduled Dover race (moved from May to August), and Gateway.

=== Broadcasting ===
In the United States, all races are aired live on TV by NASCAR on Fox on FS1 (except the third Kansas race, which moved to Fox on a schedule change announced on September 28) and on Motor Racing Network on the radio.

=== Schedule changes ===
As with the Cup and Xfinity Series, NASCAR made numerous changes to the Truck Series schedule for the 2020 season. Of note is the return of the series to Richmond Raceway for the first time since 2005, which comes at the expense of the spring Martinsville date. Martinsville in exchange was given an Xfinity Series race for the first time after a hiatus for 24 of the last 25 years (the exception being a single event in 2006), which will be run in the fall on the same weekend as the Cup and Truck Series races there. Also, this will be the first season that the season finale will be at Phoenix Raceway while Homestead–Miami Speedway moves to March after Atlanta to become the fourth race of the season. Bristol is now the elimination race for the Round of 10 while the second Las Vegas race is the opener for the Round of 8 and Martinsville, now with only one date on the schedule, will end the Round of 8.

=== Schedule changes due to the COVID-19 pandemic ===
- On March 12, 2020, it was announced that the Vet Tix/Camping World 200 at Atlanta Motor Speedway and the Diabetes Can Break Your Heart 200 at Homestead–Miami Speedway would to take place without fans in attendance due to the COVID-19 pandemic. However, the following day in respect of the NBA 2019-2020 season suspension, NASCAR announced that those races (along with the Cup and Xfinity races on those same weekends, also at Atlanta and Homestead) would be outright postponed instead.
- On March 16, 2020, NASCAR announced all race events through May 3 would be postponed due to the COVID-19 pandemic.
- On May 8, 2020, NASCAR announced that Chicagoland Speedway would not host their Truck race, the Camping World 225, for this season only as part of the COVID-19 schedule changes. Later, NASCAR announced the creation of a 2nd race at Kansas Speedway to replace the cancelled event at Chicagoland.
- On May 14, 2020, NASCAR announced that Iowa Speedway would not host a Truck race, the M&M's 200, for this season only as part of the COVID-19 schedule changes.
- On July 8, 2020, NASCAR announced the series' schedule in the month of August. This included the addition of a race at the Daytona infield road course which replaced the cancelled Iowa race. In that announcement, it was also made official that the standalone race at Eldora would be cancelled and replaced and the same would go for the Canadian Tire Motorsport Park playoff race. Gateway remained on the schedule despite being a standalone race. Additionally, because of the loss of these two races, the Gateway race became part of the regular season instead of the first race of the playoffs, and Kansas and Texas will be in the playoffs. Later, on August 6, NASCAR announced that a race at Darlington would replace the cancelled Canadian Tire Motorsports Motorsport Park race and will be part of the regular season. It marks the series' first event at the historic track in more than nine years. A third race at Kansas would replace the cancelled Eldora event and will be part of the playoffs. In that announcement, it was also revealed that the series' playoff opener has been moved to Bristol Motor Speedway.

== Results and standings ==
=== Race results ===
No.	Race	Pole position	Most laps led	Winning driver	Manufacturer	Winning team
1	NextEra Energy 250	Riley Herbst	Grant Enfinger	Grant Enfinger	Ford	ThorSport Racing
2	Strat 200	Johnny Sauter	Kyle Busch	Kyle Busch	Toyota	Kyle Busch Motorsports
3	North Carolina Education Lottery 200	Ben Rhodes	Chase Elliott	Chase Elliott	Chevrolet	GMS Racing
4	Vet Tix/Camping World 200	Christian Eckes	Kyle Busch	Grant Enfinger	Ford	ThorSport Racing
5	Baptist Health 200	Austin Hill	Kyle Busch	Kyle Busch	Toyota	Kyle Busch Motorsports
6	Pocono Organics 150	Johnny Sauter	Sheldon Creed	Brandon Jones	Toyota	Kyle Busch Motorsports
7	Buckle Up in Your Truck 225	Brett Moffitt	Brett Moffitt	Sheldon Creed	Chevrolet	GMS Racing
8	Vankor 350	Sheldon Creed	Kyle Busch	Kyle Busch	Toyota	Kyle Busch Motorsports
9	Blue-Emu Maximum Pain Relief 200	Christian Eckes	Austin Hill	Austin Hill	Toyota	Hattori Racing Enterprises
10	E.P.T. 200	Chase Purdy	Zane Smith	Matt Crafton	Ford	ThorSport Racing
11	Henry Ford Health System 200	Chandler Smith	Grant Enfinger	Zane Smith	Chevrolet	GMS Racing
12	Sunoco 159	Zane Smith	Sheldon Creed	Sheldon Creed	Chevrolet	GMS Racing
13	KDI Office Technology 200	Brett Moffitt	Brett Moffitt; Zane Smith (Tied)	Zane Smith	Chevrolet	GMS Racing
14	CarShield 200	Zane Smith	Todd Gilliland	Sheldon Creed	Chevrolet	GMS Racing
15	South Carolina Education Lottery 200	Brett Moffitt	Sheldon Creed	Ben Rhodes	Ford	ThorSport Racing
16	ToyotaCare 250	Austin Hill	Ben Rhodes	Grant Enfinger	Ford	ThorSport Racing
NASCAR Gander RV & Outdoors Truck Series Playoffs
Round of 10
17	UNOH 200 presented by Ohio Logistics	Grant Enfinger	Brett Moffitt	Sam Mayer	Chevrolet	GMS Racing
18	World of Westgate 200	Brett Moffitt	Sheldon Creed	Austin Hill	Toyota	Hattori Racing Enterprises
19	Chevrolet Silverado 250	Sheldon Creed	Derek Kraus	Raphaël Lessard	Toyota	Kyle Busch Motorsports
Round of 8
20	Clean Harbors 200	Chandler Smith	Sheldon Creed	Brett Moffitt	Chevrolet	GMS Racing
21	SpeedyCash.com 400	Sheldon Creed	Sheldon Creed	Sheldon Creed	Chevrolet	GMS Racing
22	NASCAR Hall of Fame 200	Sheldon Creed	Sheldon Creed	Grant Enfinger	Ford	ThorSport Racing
Championship 4
23	Lucas Oil 150	Grant Enfinger	Brett Moffitt	Sheldon Creed	Chevrolet	GMS Racing

=== Drivers' championship ===
(key) Bold – Pole position awarded by time. Italics – Pole position set by final practice results, owner's points, previous race field inversion, random draw or competition-based formula. * – Most laps led. ^{1} – Stage 1 winner. ^{2} – Stage 2 winner. ^{1-10} – Regular season top 10 finishers.
. – Eliminated after Round of 10 . – Eliminated after Round of 8

Pos.	Driver	DAY	LVS	CLT	ATL	HOM	POC	KEN	TEX	KAN	KAN	MCH	DRC	DOV	GTW	DAR	RCH	BRI	LVS	TAL	KAN	TEX	MAR	PHO	Pts.	Stage	Bonus
1	Sheldon Creed	9	10	5	14	20	3*^{12}	1^{2}	16	8	26	30	1*^{2}	22	1	18*^{2}	13	11	2*^{12}	12	2*^{12}	1*^{1}	8*^{1}	1	4040	–	28^{5}
2	Zane Smith **(R)**	11	6	3	5	37	14	7^{1}	19	6	9*^{12}	1	13	1*^{2}	7	16	11^{1}	16	7	33	11	3	3	2^{1}	4035	–	22^{4}
3	Brett Moffitt	13	16	4	8	36	7	11*	5^{2}	2^{1}	27	6^{1}	2^{1}	3*	2	10^{1}	4	2*^{1}	15	7	1	5	28	10*^{2}	4027	–	16^{2}
4	Grant Enfinger	1*^{2}	31	12	1	17	11	12	8	3	3	33*	7	13	8	4	1	6	6	13	4	32	1	13	4024	–	19^{8}
NASCAR Gander RV & Outdoors Truck Series Playoffs cut-off
Pos.	Driver	DAY	LVS	CLT	ATL	HOM	POC	KEN	TEX	KAN	KAN	MCH	DRC	DOV	GTW	DAR	RCH	BRI	LVS	TAL	KAN	TEX	MAR	PHO	Pts.	Stage	Bonus
5	Matt Crafton	15	4	35	12	9	40	3	3	4	1	23	4	2	14	14	2	10	9	8	8	6^{2}	5	14	2274	51	9^{7}
6	Austin Hill	6	3	9	2	7	2	5	30	1*^{2}	6	12	5	8^{1}	3	3	8	25	1	19^{1}	3	2	35	12	2242	26	28^{1}
7	Ben Rhodes	25	5	10	9	18	5	2	9	7	5	11	14	5	11	1	3*^{2}	13	23	4	20	20	2	7	2240	34	14^{3}
8	Christian Eckes **(R)**	22	23	14	3	8	33	6	2	13	2	2	12	11	32	5	18	12	8	18	6	25	4	4	2238	51	5^{6}
9	Tyler Ankrum	27	11	13	15	2	9	16	6	33	28	4	6	7	12	11	5	7^{2}	10	16	34	16	12	8	2196	13	3^{9}
10	Todd Gilliland	16	7	37	4	6	4	10	27	10	20	5	33	4	22*^{12}	7	17	14	13	28	13	31	32	9	2141	19	3^{10}
11	Derek Kraus **(R)**	4	22	16	7	15	10	8	11	5	7	8	30	10	13	2	23	15	30	10*^{2}	9	9	10	24	645	102	1
12	Raphaël Lessard **(R)**	20	30	15	18	11	37	13	12	16	11	7	3	19	6	6	26	18	20	1	33	4	20	5	563	53	5
13	Johnny Sauter	7	**2**	7	40	5	13	4	33	9	33	16^{2}	21	6	33	31	27	9	11	11	18	23	23	11	523	75	1
14	Tanner Gray **(R)**	23	8	20	11	12	12	9	36	18	4	3	15	17	10	29	16	3	3	29	36	10	31	15	511	23	–
15	Stewart Friesen	21	9	30	10	14	8	15	4	27	34	39	10	9	5	8	10	32	4	17		28	6^{2}	6	504	47	–
16	Austin Wayne Self	31	17	19	30	16	38	20	14	17	13	37	11	23	30	17	14	33	24	20	19	7	9	20	386	2	–
17	Tate Fogleman **(R)**	30	19	17	31	23	34	21	32	22	17	13	19	27	18	15	15	21	16	31	17	33	36	19	334	2	–
18	Jordan Anderson	2	20	31	37	31	17	24	28	30	15	32	35	24	17	24	24	23	32	6	30	13	19	22	323	–	–
19	Chandler Smith							22				38		20	24	23	12	5	5	3	5	21		3	312	43	–
20	Spencer Boyd	19	25	25	27	22	22	38	24	23	18	27	17	28	25	26	20	27	28	38	22	14	15	27	306	–	–
21	Ty Majeski **(R)**	32	13	8	19	10	36	19	15	11	30	15	32	14	9	13									299	16	–
22	Clay Greenfield	DNQ		29	26	30	31	26	20	28	31	20		32	19	21	21	22	22	14	25	35	21		233	–	–
23	Codie Rohrbaugh	3	18	18	33	28	39	39	22	24	29	18	29			25	6	31		5			34		225	–	–
24	Spencer Davis **(R)**		12	40	25	13	18	14	21	29	14		34	16	Wth				19				33	23	225	7	–
25	Tyler Hill					25	19	30			16	21	16	30	21				17		14	11		25	199	–	–
26	Timmy Hill		28	22	22				18	19				21		9	9	20					14		189	1	–
27	Sam Mayer													15	4		19	1					18	17	179	27	5
28	Parker Kligerman			DNQ	DNQ		15	18				9	8	34				4			15		24		175	4	–
29	Cory Roper	14	26	32	23	21	25	23	17	20	36	24	26												161	–	–
30	Jennifer Jo Cobb	DNQ	DNQ	26	36	27	32	37	29	31	32	28	31	29	31	30	36	28	34	24	29	24	29	31	158	–	–
31	Ryan Truex				13			27	13			19							12		12	34	30	21	157	3	–
32	Dawson Cram			DNQ	DNQ	32		28		25		14		25	23	33			35	35	23	18	16	28	154	–	–
33	Natalie Decker	5	21	27				29	35	21	35		20		28		34	29	36			30	27		153	–	–
34	Danny Bohn														16	20	33	24	25	34	21	17	7	26	150	–	–
35	Trevor Bayne															27	29	36		2	10	29	11	18	138	–	–
36	Norm Benning	DNQ		DNQ	DNQ	34	30	40	34	36	25	31	27	35	29	32	30	34		22	31	26	26		128	–	–
37	Carson Hocevar												28	12	15		22	17					13	32	125	5	–
38	Chase Purdy						21	31		15	10								27	32		12			118	7	–
39	Josh Reaume	Wth	27				23					17				28	32	35	29	23	27	27	37	33	115	–	–
40	Ray Ciccarelli	DNQ				29	27	32		32	24	34					31		26	27	26	22	25		111	–	–
41	Bayley Currey		DNQ	28	32		16							18		12				15					103	2	–
42	Angela Ruch	28	24	23	28	24		25	23																84	–	–
43	Tim Viens			DNQ	DNQ	Wth	29	35	26			26	24	31			35		33		32	37			74	–	–
44	Dylan Lupton																		14			8		16	73	–	–
45	Korbin Forrister	18	DNQ	24	29	33	24	34		35	Wth									36					73	–	–
46	Bryan Dauzat	29		34	39		26			37	37									21					55	–	–
47	Jason White	10																		25					39	–	–
48	David Ragan				DNQ							DNQ				22^{‡}	7								37	7	–
49	Jesse Iwuji			39			28					22							31						35	–	–
50	David Gravel											10									35				32	–	–
51	Travis Pastrana										22								21						31	–	–
52	Bryant Barnhill			DNQ	DNQ	38		33						33	26	34									31	–	–
53	Timothy Peters																				7				30	–	–
54	Scott Lagasse Jr.												9												28	–	–
55	Ryan Huff										19						28								27	–	–
56	James Buescher																					15			22	–	–
57	Gus Dean	26																		30					22	–	–
58	Hailie Deegan																				16				21	–	–
59	Bryan Collyer												18												19	–	–
60	Conor Daly																		18						19	–	–
61	Kevin Donahue									38	23														19	–	–
62	Akinori Ogata								25															30	19	–	–
63	Greg Biffle															19									18	–	–
64	Camden Murphy																	19							18	–	–
65	Alex Tagliani												22												18	3	–
66	Kris Wright												25												18	6	–
67	Trey Hutchens			DNQ	DNQ			36				29										36			18	–	–
68	Kyle Donahue														20										17	–	–
69	Gray Gaulding				34	26																			16	–	–
70	Roger Reuse												38		27										15	–	–
71	T. J. Bell			33	38	35																			15	–	–
72	Mike Skeen												23												14	–	–
73	J. J. Yeley													26											11	–	–
74	Cody Erickson																	30							7	–	–
75	Mark Smith												36												5	–	–
76	Bobby Kennedy												37^{†}												5	–	–
77	Joe Nemechek	DNQ																		37					5	–	–
	Todd Peck	DNQ																							0	–	–
Ineligible for Gander RV & Outdoors Truck championship points
Pos.	Driver	DAY	LVS	CLT	ATL	HOM	POC	KEN	TEX	KAN	KAN	MCH	DRC	DOV	GTW	DAR	RCH	BRI	LVS	TAL	KAN	TEX	MAR	PHO	Pts.	Stage	Bonus
	Kyle Busch		1*^{12}	2	21*^{12}	1*^{2}			1*^{1}																		
	Chase Elliott			1*^{2}	20	4																					
	Brandon Jones						1			14	8												17				
	Ross Chastain	8	14	11^{1}	6	3^{1}	6		10	34								8									
	John Hunter Nemechek	DNQ		6	24							25															
	Justin Haley								7																		
	Kaz Grala																			9							
	Brennan Poole	17	15	38	17	19	35	17	31	12	12	35															
	Riley Herbst	**12**^{1}																									
	Jeb Burton				16							36															
	Josh Bilicki		32														25	26			28	19					
	Robby Lyons						20			26	21									26				29			
	Jesse Little	24		21	35																						
	B. J. McLeod																						22				
	Colin Garrett																				24						
	Stefan Parsons		29																								
	Garrett Smithley			36																							
	Erik Jones			DNQ																							
Pos.	Driver	DAY	LVS	CLT	ATL	HOM	POC	KEN	TEX	KAN	KAN	MCH	DRC	DOV	GTW	DAR	RCH	BRI	LVS	TAL	KAN	TEX	MAR	PHO	Pts.	Stage	Bonus
^{†} – Due to the extreme heat, Bobby Kennedy did not run the full race at the Daytona Road Course and was relieved by Josh Reaume. Since Kennedy started the race, he is officially credited with the 37th-place finish.^{‡} – David Ragan started receiving points at Richmond.

=== Owners' championship (Top 15) ===
(key) Bold – Pole position awarded by time. Italics – Pole position set by final practice results, owner's points, previous race field inversion, random draw or competition-based formula. * – Most laps led. ^{1} – Stage 1 winner. ^{2} – Stage 2 winner. ^{1-10} – Owners' regular season top 10 finishers.
. – Eliminated after Round of 10 . – Eliminated after Round of 8

Pos.	No.	Car Owner	DAY	LVS	CLT	ATL	HOM	POC	KEN	TEX	KAN	KAN	MCH	DRC	DOV	GTW	DAR	RCH	BRI	LVS	TAL	KAN	TEX	MAR	PHO	Points	Bonus
1	2	Maurice J. Gallagher Jr.	9	10	5	14	20	3*^{12}	1^{2}	16	8	26	30	1*^{2}	22	1	18*^{2}	13	11	2*^{12}	12	2*^{12}	1*^{1}	8*^{1}	1	4040	28^{5}
2	21	Maurice J. Gallagher Jr.	11	6	3	5	37	14	7^{1}	19	6	9*^{12}	1	13	1*^{2}	7	16	11^{1}	16	7	33	11	3	3	2^{1}	4035	22^{4}
3	23	Maurice J. Gallagher Jr.	13	16	4	8	36	7	11*	5^{2}	2^{1}	27	6^{1}	2^{1}	3*	2	10^{1}	4	2*^{1}	15	7	1	5	28	10*^{2}	4027	16^{2}
4	98	Mike Curb	1*^{2}	31	12	1	17	11	12	8	3	3	33*	7	13	8	4	1	6	6	13	4	32	1	13	4024	19^{8}
NASCAR Gander RV & Outdoors Truck Series Playoffs cut-off
5	88	Rhonda Thorson	15	4	35	12	9	40	3	3	4	1	23	4	2	14	14	2	10	9	8	8	6^{2}	5	14	2274	9^{7}
6	51	Kyle Busch	**12**^{1}	1*^{12}	2	21*^{12}	1*^{2}	1	22	1*^{1}	14	8	38	22	20	24	23	12	5	5	3	5	21	17	3	2243	2^{9}
7	16	Shigeaki Hattori	6	3	9	2	7	2	5	30	1*^{2}	6	12	5	8^{1}	3	3	8	25	1	19^{1}	3	2	35	12	2242	28^{1}
8	99	Duke Thorson	25	5	10	9	18	5	2	9	7	5	11	14	5	11	1	3*^{2}	13	23	4	20	20	2	7	2240	14^{3}
9	18	Kyle Busch	22	23	14	3	8	33	6	2	13	2	2	12	11	32	5	18	12	8	18	6	25	4	4	2238	5^{6}
10	26	Maurice J. Gallagher Jr.	27	11	13	15	2	9	16	6	33	28	4	6	7	12	11	5	7^{2}	10	16	34	16	12	8	2196	2^{10}
11	19	Bill McAnally	4	22	16	7	15	10	8	11	5	7	8	30	10	13	2	23	15	30	10*^{2}	9	9	10	24	645	1
12	38	Bob Jenkins	16	7	37	4	6	4	10	27	10	20	5	33	4	22*^{12}	7	17	14	13	28	13	31	32	9	603	2
13	4	Kyle Busch	20	30	15	18	11	37	13	12	16	11	7	3	19	6	6	26	18	20	1	33	4	20	5	563	5
14	52	Chris Larsen	21	9	30	10	14	8	15	4	27	34	39	10	9	5	8	10	32	4	17	7	28	6^{2}	6	534	–
15	13	Duke Thorson	7	**2**	7	40	5	13	4	33	9	33	16^{2}	21	6	33	31	27	9	11	11	18	23	23	11	523	–
Pos.	No.	Car Owner	DAY	LVS	CLT	ATL	HOM	POC	KEN	TEX	KAN	KAN	MCH	DRC	DOV	GTW	DAR	RCH	BRI	LVS	TAL	KAN	TEX	MAR	PHO	Points	Bonus

=== Manufacturers' Championship ===
Pos	Manufacturer	Wins	Points
1	Chevrolet	10	827
2	Toyota	7	815
3	Ford	6	802

== See also ==
- 2020 NASCAR Cup Series
- 2020 NASCAR Xfinity Series
- 2020 ARCA Menards Series
- 2020 ARCA Menards Series East
- 2020 ARCA Menards Series West
- 2020 NASCAR Whelen Modified Tour
- 2020 NASCAR Pinty's FanCave Challenge
- 2020 NASCAR Whelen Euro Series
- 2020 eNASCAR iRacing Pro Invitational Series
- 2020 EuroNASCAR Esports Series
