= 2020 NextEra Energy 250 =

Race details
- Race 1 of 23 in the 2020 NASCAR Gander RV & Outdoors Truck Series season
- Date: February 14, 2020
- Location: Daytona International Speedway in Daytona Beach, Florida
- Course: Permanent racing facility
- Course length: 2.5 miles (4.023 km)
- Distance: 106 laps, 265 mi (426.476 km)
- Scheduled distance: 100 laps, 250 mi (402.336 km)

Pole position
Driver	Riley Herbst	Kyle Busch Motorsports
- Time: 49.544

Most laps led
Driver	Grant Enfinger	ThorSport Racing
- Laps: 41

Winner
No. 98	Grant Enfinger	ThorSport Racing

Television in the United States
- Network: FS1

Radio in the United States
- Radio: MRN

The 2020 NextEra Energy 250 was a NASCAR Gander RV & Outdoors Truck Series race held on February 14, 2020. Contested over 106 laps due to an overtime finish, on the 2.5-mile (4.0 km) asphalt superspeedway. It was the first race of the 2020 NASCAR Gander RV & Outdoors Truck Series season. This race is known for being the closest Daytona finish in the truck series, as Grant Enfinger beat Jordan Anderson by 0.010 seconds.

== Entry list ==
No.	Driver	Team	Manufacturer	Sponsor
00	Angela Ruch	Reaume Brothers Racing	Chevrolet	DWF Flooring/Cabinets
02	Tate Fogleman (R)	Young's Motorsports	Chevrolet	Solid Rock Carriers
2	Sheldon Creed	GMS Racing	Chevrolet	Chevy.com /Trench Shoring
03	Tim Viens*	Mike Affarano Motorsports	Chevrolet	Trump-Pence 2020/Race Fans for Trump
3	Jordan Anderson	Jordan Anderson Racing	Chevrolet	K-Seal / Bommarito.com
04	Cory Roper	Roper Racing	Ford	JBL
4	Raphaël Lessard (R)	Kyle Busch Motorsports	Toyota	Alliance Aviation
6	Norm Benning	Norm Benning Racing	Chevrolet	H & H Transport
7	Korbin Forrister	All Out Motorsports	Toyota	50 Egg Music
8	John Hunter Nemechek (i)	NEMCO Motorsports	Ford	Nemco
9	Codie Rohrbaugh	CR7 Motorsports	Chevrolet	GCM/CR7 Motorsports
10	Jennifer Jo Cobb	Jennifer Jo Cobb Racing	Chevrolet	Driven2Honor.org
13	Johnny Sauter	ThorSport Racing	Ford	Tenda Heal
15	Tanner Gray (R)	DGR-Crosley	Ford	Ford | Ford Performance
16	Austin Hill	Hattori Racing Enterprises	Toyota	United Rentals
18	Christian Eckes (R)	Kyle Busch Motorsports	Toyota	Safelite Auto Glass
19	Derek Kraus (R)	McAnally-Hilgemann Racing	Toyota	SHOCKWAVE
20	Spencer Boyd	Young's Motorsports	Chevrolet	CuraLife
21	Zane Smith (R)	GMS Racing	Chevrolet	ICON Vehicle Dynamics
22	Austin Wayne Self	AM Racing	Chevrolet	GO TEXAN
23	Brett Moffitt	GMS Racing	Chevrolet	CMRroofing.com
26	Tyler Ankrum	GMS Racing	Chevrolet	Liuna!
28	Bryan Dauzat	FDNY Racing	Chevrolet	FDNY /AMERICAN GENOMICS
30	Brennan Poole (i)	On Point Motorsports	Toyota	Spartan Mosquito
33	Jason White	Reaume Brothers Racing	Chevrolet	Your GMC Truck Store
34	Josh Reaume*	Reaume Brothers Racing	Chevrolet	Motorsports Safety Grp
38	Todd Gilliland	Front Row Motorsports	Ford	Black's Tire
40	Ross Chastain (i)	Niece Motorsports	Chevrolet	Plan B Sales
44	Natalie Decker	Niece Motorsports	Chevrolet	N29 Technologies
45	Ty Majeski (R)	Niece Motorsports	Chevrolet	Plan B Sales
49	Ray Ciccarelli	CMI Motorsports	Chevrolet	CMI Motorsports
51	Riley Herbst (i)	Kyle Busch Motorsports	Toyota	Mobil 1
52	Stewart Friesen	Halmar Friesen Racing	Toyota	Halmar International
56	Gus Dean	Hill Motorsports	Chevrolet	MASHONIT
68	Clay Greenfield	Clay Greenfield Motorsports	Toyota	Rackley Roofing
87	Joe Nemechek	NEMCO Motorsports	Ford	Berrys Bullets
88	Matt Crafton	ThorSport Racing	Ford	Fisher Nutts/ Menards
96	Todd Peck	Peck Motorsports	Chevrolet	Holla Vodka
97	Jesse Little (i)	Diversified Motorsports Enterprises	Chevrolet	Teletrac Navman
98	Grant Enfinger	ThorSport Racing	Ford	ThorSport Racing/ Curb Records
99	Ben Rhodes	ThorSport Racing	Ford	Havoline

*Withdrew.

== Practice ==
=== First practice ===
Zane Smith was the fastest in the first practice session with a time of 46.590 seconds and a speed of 193.175 mph (310.885 km/h).

Pos	No.	Driver	Team	Manufacturer	Time	Speed
1	21	Zane Smith (R)	GMS Racing	Chevrolet	46.590	193.175
2	51	Riley Herbst (i)	Kyle Busch Motorsports	Toyota	46.628	193.017
3	45	Ty Majeski (R)	Niece Motorsports	Chevrolet	46.630	193.009

=== Final practice ===
Johnny Sauter was the fastest in the final practice session with a time of 46.565 seconds and a speed of 193.278 mph (311.051 km/h).

Pos	No.	Driver	Team	Manufacturer	Time	Speed
1	13	Johnny Sauter	ThorSport Racing	Ford	46.565	193.278
2	88	Matt Crafton	ThorSport Racing	Ford	46.577	193.228
3	16	Austin Hill	Hattori Racing Enterprises	Toyota	46.718	192.645

== Qualifying ==
Riley Herbst scored the pole for the race with a time of 49.544 seconds and a speed of 181.657 mph (292.349 km/h).

=== Qualifying results ===
Pos	No	Driver	Team	Manufacturer	Time
1	51	Riley Herbst (i)	Kyle Busch Motorsports	Toyota	49.544
2	23	Brett Moffitt	GMS Racing	Chevrolet	49.548
3	18	Christian Eckes (R)	Kyle Busch Motorsports	Toyota	49.551
4	40	Ross Chastain (i)	Niece Motorsports	Chevrolet	49.572
5	13	Johnny Sauter	ThorSport Racing	Ford	49.664
6	21	Zane Smith (R)	GMS Racing	Chevrolet	49.763
7	26	Tyler Ankrum	GMS Racing	Chevrolet	49.873
8	4	Raphaël Lessard (R)	Kyle Busch Motorsports	Toyota	49.915
9	7	Korbin Forrister	All Out Motorsports	Toyota	50.057
10	88	Matt Crafton	ThorSport Racing	Ford	50.073
11	98	Grant Enfinger	ThorSport Racing	Ford	50.139
12	2	Sheldon Creed	GMS Racing	Chevrolet	50.154
13	99	Ben Rhodes	ThorSport Racing	Ford	50.167
14	15	Tanner Gray (R)	DGR-Crosley	Ford	50.207
15	16	Austin Hill	Hattori Racing Enterprises	Toyota	50.311
16	19	Derek Kraus (R)	McAnally-Hilgemann Racing	Toyota	50.314
17	45	Ty Majeski (R)	Niece Motorsports	Chevrolet	50.322
18	02	Tate Fogleman (R)	Young's Motorsports	Chevrolet	50.392
19	04	Cory Roper	Roper Racing	Ford	50.452
20	56	Gus Dean	Hill Motorsports	Chevrolet	50.560
21	9	Codie Rohrbaugh	CR7 Motorsports	Chevrolet	50.657
22	28	Bryan Dauzat	FDNY Racing	Chevrolet	50.674
23	3	Jordan Anderson	Jordan Anderson Racing	Chevrolet	50.676
24	22	Austin Wayne Self	AM Racing	Chevrolet	50.704
25	38	Todd Gilliland	Front Row Motorsports	Ford	50.708
26	97	Jesse Little (i)	Diversified Motorsports Enterprises	Chevrolet	50.736
27	30	Brennan Poole (i)	On Point Motorsports	Toyota	50.876
28	52	Stewart Friesen	Halmar Friesen Racing	Toyota	50.954
29	20	Spencer Boyd	Young's Motorsports	Chevrolet	50.973
30	44	Natalie Decker	Niece Motorsports	Chevrolet	51.033
31	33	Jason White	Reaume Brothers Racing	Chevrolet	51.799
32	00	Angela Ruch	Reaume Brothers Racing	Chevrolet	52.140
Failed to qualify
33	87	Joe Nemechek	NEMCO Motorsports	Ford	50.960
34	10	Jennifer Jo Cobb	Jennifer Jo Cobb Racing	Chevrolet	51.015
35	8	John Hunter Nemechek (i)	NEMCO Motorsports	Ford	51.063
36	68	Clay Greenfield	Clay Greenfield Motorsports	Toyota	51.082
37	49	Ray Ciccarelli	CMI Motorsports	Chevrolet	51.477
38	96	Todd Peck	Peck Motorsports	Chevrolet	51.704
39	6	Norm Benning	Norm Benning Racing	Chevrolet	52.227
Withdrew
	03	Tim Viens	Mike Affarano Racing	Chevrolet	0.000
	34	Josh Reaume	Reaume Brothers Racing	Chevrolet	0.000

== Race ==
=== Race results ===
==== Stage Results ====
Stage One Laps: 20

Pos	No	Driver	Team	Manufacturer	Points
1	51	Riley Herbst (i)	Kyle Busch Motorsports	Toyota	0
2	26	Tyler Ankrum	GMS Racing	Chevrolet	9
3	18	Christian Eckes (R)	Kyle Busch Motorsports	Toyota	8
4	23	Brett Moffitt	GMS Racing	Chevrolet	7
5	13	Johnny Sauter	ThorSport Racing	Ford	6
6	52	Stewart Friesen	Halmar Friesen Racing	Toyota	5
7	16	Austin Hill	Hattori Racing Enterprises	Toyota	4
8	98	Grant Enfinger	ThorSport Racing	Ford	3
9	4	Raphaël Lessard (R)	Kyle Busch Motorsports	Toyota	2
10	38	Todd Gilliland	Front Row Motorsports	Ford	1

Stage Two Laps: 20

Pos	No	Driver	Team	Manufacturer	Points
1	98	Grant Enfinger	ThorSport Racing	Ford	10
2	99	Ben Rhodes	ThorSport Racing	Ford	9
3	26	Tyler Ankrum	GMS Racing	Chevrolet	8
4	16	Austin Hill	Hattori Racing Enterprises	Toyota	7
5	51	Riley Herbst (i)	Kyle Busch Motorsports	Toyota	0
6	4	Raphaël Lessard (R)	Kyle Busch Motorsports	Toyota	5
7	52	Stewart Friesen	Halmar Friesen Racing	Toyota	4
8	13	Johnny Sauter	ThorSport Racing	Ford	3
9	2	Sheldon Creed	GMS Racing	Chevrolet	2
10	15	Tanner Gray (R)	DGR-Crosley	Ford	1

=== Final Stage Results ===
Laps: 65

Pos	Grid	No	Driver	Team	Manufacturer	Laps	Points
1	11	98	Grant Enfinger	ThorSport Racing	Ford	106	53
2	23	3	Jordan Anderson	Jordan Anderson Racing	Chevrolet	106	35
3	21	9	Codie Rohrbaugh	CR7 Motorsports	Chevrolet	106	34
4	16	19	Derek Kraus (R)	McAnally-Hilgemann Racing	Toyota	106	33
5	30	44	Natalie Decker	Niece Motorsports	Chevrolet	106	32
6	15	16	Austin Hill	Hattori Racing Enterprises	Toyota	106	42
7	5	13	Johnny Sauter	ThorSport Racing	Ford	106	39
8	4	40	Ross Chastain (i)	Niece Motorsports	Chevrolet	106	0
9	12	2	Sheldon Creed	GMS Racing	Chevrolet	106	30
10	31	33	Jason White	Reaume Brothers Racing	Chevrolet	106	27
11	6	21	Zane Smith (R)	GMS Racing	Chevrolet	106	26
12	1	51	Riley Herbst (i)	Kyle Busch Motorsports	Toyota	106	0
13	2	23	Brett Moffitt	GMS Racing	Chevrolet	106	31
14	19	04	Cory Roper	Roper Racing	Ford	106	23
15	10	88	Matt Crafton	ThorSport Racing	Ford	106	22
16	25	38	Todd Gilliland	Front Row Motorsports	Ford	106	22
17	27	30	Brennan Poole (i)	On Point Motorsports	Toyota	106	0
18	9	7	Korbin Forrister	All Out Motorsports	Toyota	106	19
19	29	20	Spencer Boyd	Young's Motorsports	Chevrolet	105	18
20	8	4	Raphaël Lessard (R)	Kyle Busch Motorsports	Toyota	105	24
21	28	52	Stewart Friesen	Halmar Friesen Racing	Toyota	105	25
22	3	18	Christian Eckes (R)	Kyle Busch Motorsports	Toyota	105	23
23	14	15	Tanner Gray (R)	DGR-Crosley	Ford	98	15
24	26	97	Jesse Little (i)	Diversified Motorsports Enterprises	Chevrolet	98	0
25	13	99	Ben Rhodes	ThorSport Racing	Ford	97	21
26	20	56	Gus Dean	Hill Motorsports	Chevrolet	97	11
27	7	26	Tyler Ankrum	GMS Racing	Chevrolet	97	27
28	32	00	Angela Ruch	Reaume Brothers Racing	Chevrolet	65	9
29	22	28	Bryan Dauzat	FDNY Racing	Chevrolet	65	8
30	18	02	Tate Fogleman (R)	Young's Motorsports	Chevrolet	62	7
31	24	22	Austin Wayne Self	AM Racing	Chevrolet	15	6
32	17	45	Ty Majeski (R)	Niece Motorsports	Chevrolet	15	5

Previous race: 2019 Ford EcoBoost 200	NASCAR Gander RV & Outdoors Truck Series; 2020 season	Next race: 2020 Strat 200
