= Codie Rohrbaugh =

American racing driver and team owner (born 1993)

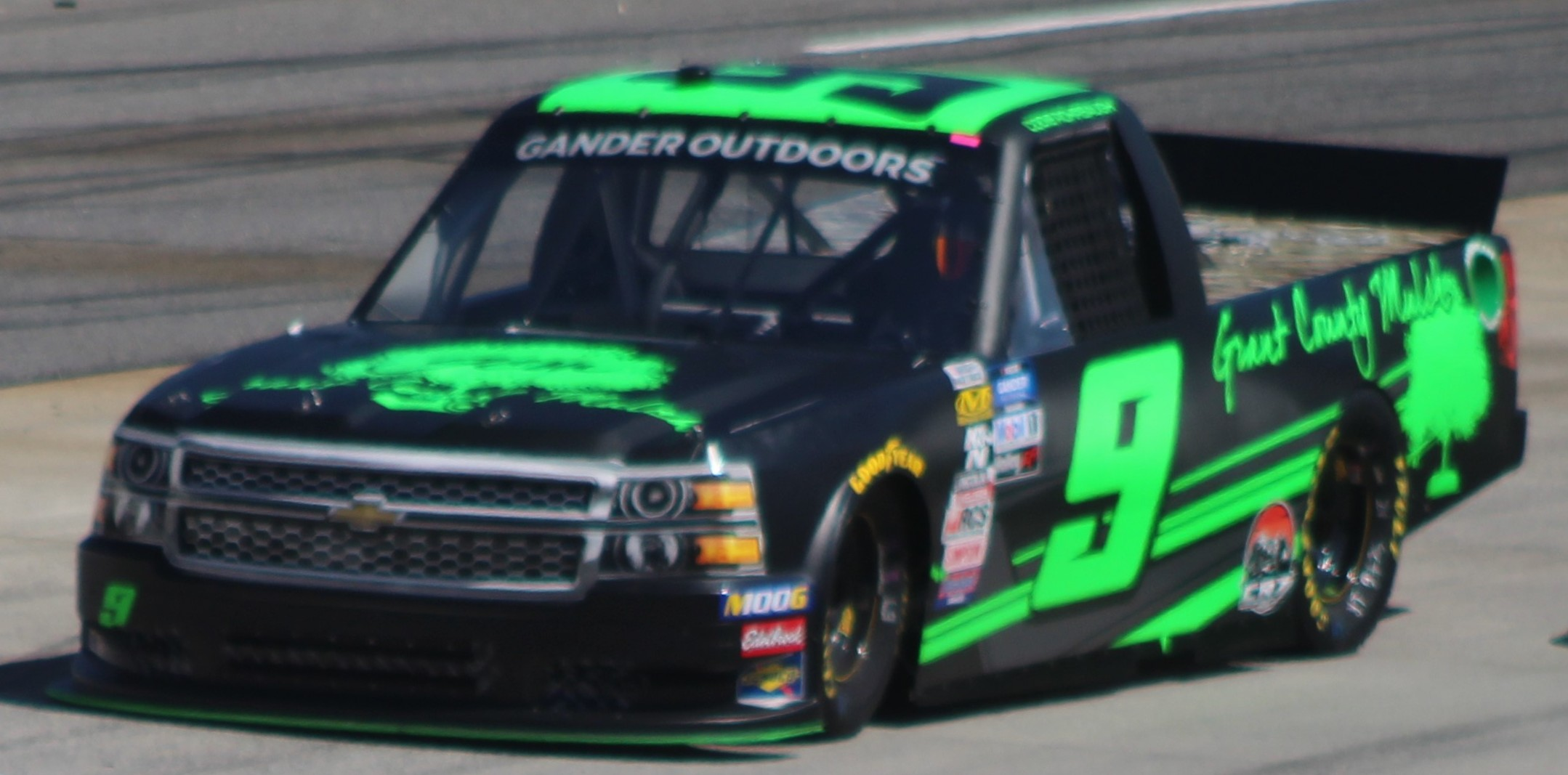
- Rohrbaugh at Martinsville in 2019
- Born: Codie Benjamin William Rohrbaugh; November 12, 1993 (age 33); Petersburg, West Virginia, U.S.

NASCAR FedEx Freight Truck Series career
- 38 races run over 6 years
- 2024 position: 62nd
- Best finish: 23rd (2020)
- First race: 2018 UNOH 200 (Bristol)
- Last race: 2024 Fresh From Florida 250 (Daytona)
| Wins | Top tens | Poles |
|---|---|---|
| 0 | 5 | 0 |

ARCA Menards Series career
- 20 races run over 4 years
- Best finish: 19th (2017, 2018)
- First race: 2016 Crosley 150 (Kentucky)
- Last race: 2019 General Tire 150 (Charlotte)
| Wins | Top tens | Poles |
|---|---|---|
| 0 | 7 | 0 |

ARCA Menards Series East career
- 14 races run over 3 years
- Best finish: 23rd (2015)
- First race: 2014 Pensacola 150 (Pensacola)
- Last race: 2016 Dover 125 (Dover)
| Wins | Top tens | Poles |
|---|---|---|
| 0 | 1 | 0 |
- Statistics up to date as of November 8, 2024.

Codie Benjamin William Rohrbaugh (born November 12, 1993) is an American professional stock car racing driver and team owner. He last competed part-time in the NASCAR Craftsman Truck Series, driving the No. 97 Chevrolet Silverado for his family team, CR7 Motorsports. He also has competed in the ARCA Menards Series and ARCA Menards Series East in the past.

== Racing career ==
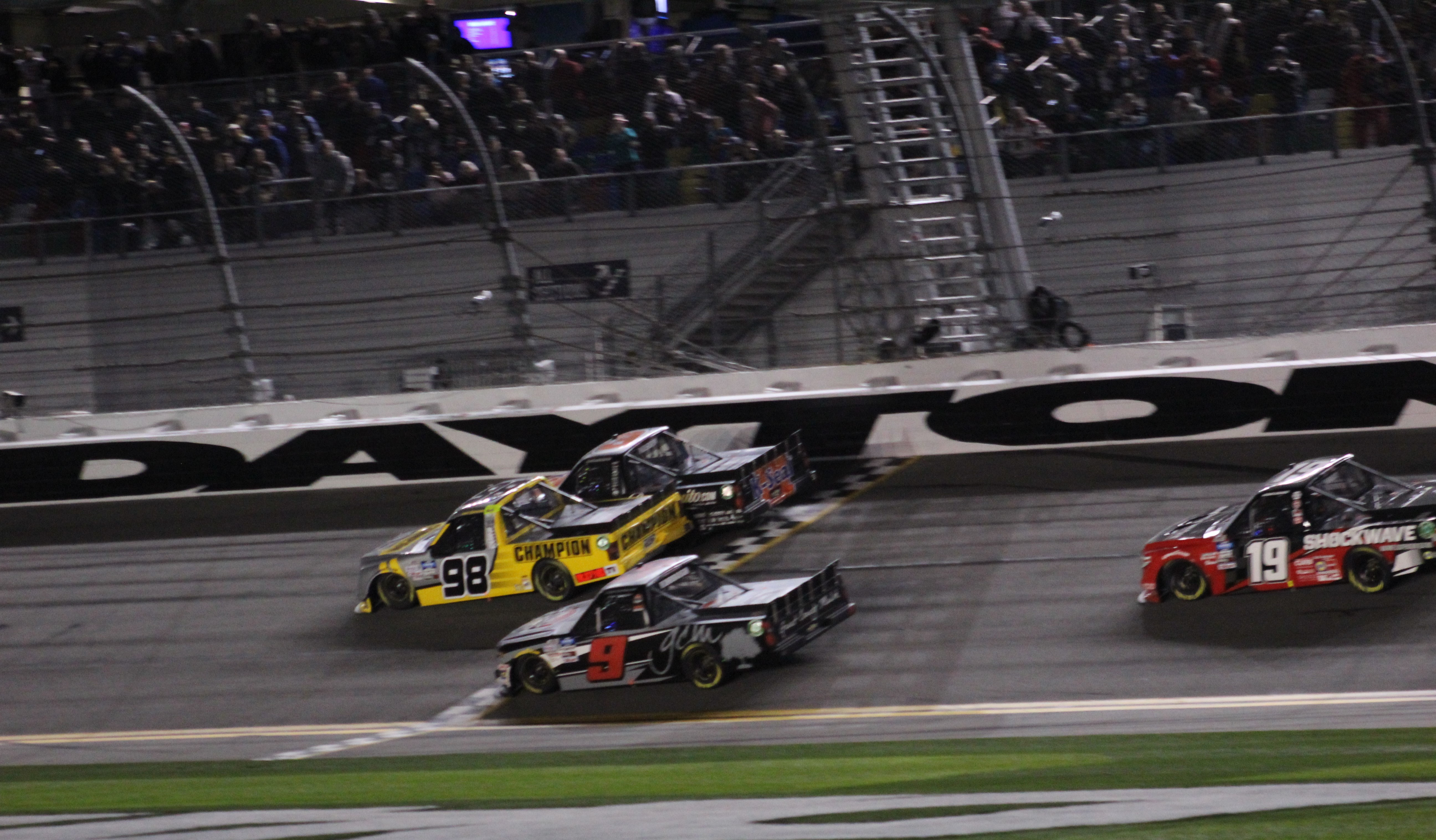
Rohrbaugh (No. 9) coming to the finish in the 2020 Truck Series season-opening race at Daytona

Rohrbaugh made his NASCAR debut in what was then known as the K&N East Series in 2014, where he ran three races in his No. 05 Toyota. He would return to the series part-time in 2015 and 2016.

Rohrbaugh began racing in ARCA in 2016, running two races in the No. 7 Chevrolet for his own team, Grant County Mulch Racing. He would later run eight races both in 2017 and 2018.

Rohrbaugh made his Truck Series debut in 2018, driving the No. 9 Chevrolet Silverado for Grant County Mulch Racing at Bristol. He started 25th and finished 16th.

In 2019, Rohrbaugh returned to the Truck Series, attempting a total of twelve races. He failed to qualify for his first two races at Daytona and Martinsville before qualifying at Texas in March, where he started nineteenth and finished 23rd. He recorded his first career top-ten at Martinsville.

In the 2020 season opener at Daytona, Rohrbaugh avoided wrecks en route to a career-best third-place finish; he had finished three-wide with race winner Grant Enfinger and runner-up Jordan Anderson. His next top-ten was a sixth place finish at Richmond Raceway in September.

== Motorsports career results ==
=== NASCAR ===
(key) (Bold – Pole position awarded by qualifying time. Italics – Pole position earned by points standings or practice time. * – Most laps led.)

==== Craftsman Truck Series ====
NASCAR Craftsman Truck Series results
| Year | Team | No. | Make | 1 | 2 | 3 | 4 | 5 | 6 | 7 | 8 | 9 | 10 | 11 | 12 | 13 | 14 | 15 | 16 | 17 | 18 | 19 | 20 | 21 | 22 | 23 | NCTC | Pts | Ref |
|---|---|---|---|---|---|---|---|---|---|---|---|---|---|---|---|---|---|---|---|---|---|---|---|---|---|---|---|---|---|
| 2018 | CR7 Motorsports | 9 | Chevy | DAY | ATL | LVS | MAR | DOV | KAN | CLT | TEX | IOW | GTW | CHI | KEN | ELD | POC | MCH | BRI; 16 | MSP | LVS | TAL | MAR | | | | 51st | 41 | |
| 2018 | CR7 Motorsports | 9 | Ford | | | | | | | | | | | | | | | | | | | | | TEX; 17 | PHO | HOM | 51st | 41 | |
| 2019 | CR7 Motorsports | 9 | Chevy | DAY; DNQ | ATL | LVS | MAR; DNQ | TEX; 23 | DOV | KAN | CLT; 29 | TEX; 30 | IOW | GTW | CHI | KEN; 14 | POC | ELD | MCH; 17 | BRI; DNQ | MSP | LVS; 16 | TAL; 24 | MAR; 10 | PHO | HOM; 26 | 29th | 144 | |
| 2020 | CR7 Motorsports | 9 | Chevy | DAY; 3 | LVS; 18 | CLT; 18 | ATL; 33 | HOM; 28 | POC; 39 | KEN; 39 | TEX; 22 | KAN; 24 | KAN; 29 | MCH; 18 | DRC; 29 | DOV | GTW | DAR; 25 | RCH; 6 | BRI; 31 | LVS | TAL; 5 | KAN | TEX | MAR; 34 | PHO | 23rd | 225 | |
| 2021 | CR7 Motorsports | 9 | Chevy | DAY; 8 | DRC; 16 | LVS | ATL; 29 | BRD; 27 | RCH; 36 | KAN | DAR; 38 | COA | CLT | TEX | NSH | POC | KNX; 34 | GLN | GTW | DAR | BRI | LVS | TAL; 16 | MAR | PHO | | 37th | 94 | |
| 2023 | CR7 Motorsports | 97 | Chevy | DAY; 33 | LVS | ATL | COA | TEX | BRD | MAR | KAN | DAR | NWS | CLT | GTW | NSH | MOH | POC | RCH | IRP | MLW | KAN | BRI | TAL | HOM | PHO | 78th | 4 | |
| 2024 | CR7 Motorsports | 97 | Chevy | DAY; 23 | ATL | LVS | BRI | COA | MAR | TEX | KAN | DAR | NWS | CLT | GTW | NSH | POC | IRP | RCH | MLW | BRI | KAN | TAL | HOM | MAR | PHO | 62nd | 14 | |

^{*} Season still in progress
^{1} Ineligible for series points

=== ARCA Menards Series ===
(key) (Bold – Pole position awarded by qualifying time. Italics – Pole position earned by points standings or practice time. * – Most laps led.)

ARCA Menards Series results
| Year | Team | No. | Make | 1 | 2 | 3 | 4 | 5 | 6 | 7 | 8 | 9 | 10 | 11 | 12 | 13 | 14 | 15 | 16 | 17 | 18 | 19 | 20 | AMSC | Pts | Ref |
|---|---|---|---|---|---|---|---|---|---|---|---|---|---|---|---|---|---|---|---|---|---|---|---|---|---|---|
| 2016 | Grant County Mulch Racing | 7 | Chevy | DAY | NSH | SLM | TAL | TOL | NJE | POC | MCH | MAD | WIN | IOW | IRP | POC | BLN | ISF | DSF | SLM | CHI | KEN; 13 | KAN; 32 | 86th | 235 | |
| 2017 | Grant County Mulch Racing | 7 | Dodge | DAY; 14 | NSH | SLM | TAL; 14 | TOL | ELK | | | | | | | | | | | | | | | 19th | 1285 | |
| 2017 | Grant County Mulch Racing | 7 | Chevy | | | | | | | POC; 12 | MCH; 8 | MAD | IOW | IRP | POC; 11 | WIN | ISF | ROA | DSF | SLM | CHI; 29 | KEN; 16 | KAN; 8 | 19th | 1285 | |
| 2018 | Grant County Mulch Racing | 7 | Chevy | DAY; 38 | NSH | SLM | TAL; 24 | TOL | CLT; 9 | POC; 17 | MCH; 10 | MAD | GTW | CHI; 8 | IOW | ELK | POC; 7 | ISF | BLN | DSF | SLM | IRP | KAN; 12 | 19th | 1285 | |
| 2019 | Grant County Mulch Racing | 7 | Chevy | DAY; 7 | FIF | SLM | TAL | NSH | TOL | CLT; 16 | POC | MCH | MAD | GTW | CHI | ELK | IOW | POC | ISF | DSF | SLM | IRP | KAN | 52nd | 345 | |

==== K&N Pro Series East ====
NASCAR K&N Pro Series East results
| Year | Team | No. | Make | 1 | 2 | 3 | 4 | 5 | 6 | 7 | 8 | 9 | 10 | 11 | 12 | 13 | 14 | 15 | 16 | NKNPSEC | Pts | Ref |
|---|---|---|---|---|---|---|---|---|---|---|---|---|---|---|---|---|---|---|---|---|---|---|
| 2014 | Grant County Mulch Racing | 05 | Toyota | NSM | DAY | BRI | GRE | RCH | IOW | BGS | FIF; 13 | LGY | NHA; 23 | COL | IOW | GLN | VIR | GRE | DOV; 29 | 38th | 67 | |
| 2015 | Grant County Mulch Racing | 7 | Chevy | NSM; 13 | GRE | BRI; 22 | IOW | BGS | LGY | COL | NHA; 19 | IOW | GLN | MOT; 9 | VIR | RCH; 13 | DOV; 17 | | | 23rd | 171 | |
| 2016 | Grant County Mulch Racing | 7 | Chevy | NSM; 19 | MOB; 19 | GRE | BRI; 26 | VIR | DOM | STA | COL | NHA; 13 | IOW | GLN | GRE | NJM | DOV; 22 | | | 30th | 101 | |
