= Bryan Collyer =

American racing driver

- Born: Bryan R. Collyer; September 16, 1962 (age 64); Ormond Beach, Florida, U.S.

NASCAR FedEx Freight Truck Series career
- 1 race run over 1 year
- 2020 position: 59th
- Best finish: 59th (2020)
- First race: 2020 Sunoco 159 (Daytona RC)
Wins	Top tens	Poles
0	0	0
- Statistics up to date as of November 11, 2020.

Bryan R. Collyer (born September 16, 1962) is an American professional stock car racing driver. He last competed part-time in the NASCAR Gander RV & Outdoors Truck Series, driving the No. 33 Chevrolet Silverado for Reaume Brothers Racing.

== Motorsports career results ==
=== NASCAR ===
(key) (Bold – Pole position awarded by qualifying time. Italics – Pole position earned by points standings or practice time. * – Most laps led.)

==== Gander RV & Outdoors Truck Series ====
NASCAR Gander RV & Outdoors Truck Series results
Year	Team	No.	Make	1	2	3	4	5	6	7	8	9	10	11	12	13	14	15	16	17	18	19	20	21	22	23	NGTC	Pts	Ref
2020	Reaume Brothers Racing	33	Chevy	DAY	LVS	CLT	ATL	HOM	POC	KEN	TEX	KAN	KAN	MCH	DAY; 18	DOV	GTW	DAR	RCH	BRI	LVS	TAL	KAN	TEX	MAR	PHO	59th	19	
