= Mark Smith (Pennsylvanian racing driver) =

American racing driver (born 1971)

- Born: Mark E. Smith; July 14, 1971 (age 55); Sunbury, Pennsylvania, U.S.
- Achievements: 2014, 2016, 2020 Selinsgrove Speedway track champion

NASCAR FedEx Freight Truck Series career
- 2 races run over 2 years
- 2020 position: 75th
- Best finish: 73rd (2019)
- First race: 2019 Eldora Dirt Derby (Eldora)
- Last race: 2020 Sunoco 159 (Daytona RC)
Wins	Top tens	Poles
0	0	0
- Statistics up to date as of November 11, 2020.

Mark E. Smith (born July 14, 1971) is an American professional racing driver with experience in sprint car and stock car racing. He last competed in the United Sprint Car Series and part-time in the NASCAR Gander RV & Outdoors Truck Series, driving the No. 42 Chevrolet Silverado for Niece Motorsports.

== Racing career ==
=== Sprint car career ===
Smith's early career progressed from go-kart racing to Super Sportsman racing to sprint car racing, including 360 and 410 sprint cars, as well as competing in the World of Outlaws. He won the United Sprint Car Series Winter Heat championship in 2019, and has estimated his number of open-wheel victories at 200. In winter 2020, Smith raced in the USCS Thunder Tour, scoring three wins in the first two months of the year.

=== Stock car career ===
On July 20, 2019, it was announced that Smith was scheduled to make his NASCAR Gander Outdoors Truck Series debut at the 2019 Eldora Dirt Derby in a partnership between Jordan Anderson Racing and Niece Motorsports.

A year later, Smith rejoined Niece in their No. 42 entry to drive the Daytona road course race.

== Business career ==
Mach 1 Chassis is owned by Smith, and was a partner in his NASCAR Truck Series debut.

== Personal life ==
Smith is married with children.

== Motorsports career results ==
=== NASCAR ===
(key) (Bold – Pole position awarded by qualifying time. Italics – Pole position earned by points standings or practice time. * – Most laps led.)

==== Gander RV & Outdoors Truck Series ====
NASCAR Gander RV & Outdoors Truck Series results
Year	Team	No.	Make	1	2	3	4	5	6	7	8	9	10	11	12	13	14	15	16	17	18	19	20	21	22	23	NGTC	Pts	Ref
2019	Niece Motorsports	38	Chevy	DAY	ATL	LVS	MAR	TEX	DOV	KAN	CLT	TEX	IOW	GTW	CHI	KEN	POC	ELD; 15	MCH	BRI	MSP	LVS	TAL	MAR	PHO	HOM	73rd	22	
2020	Niece Motorsports	42	Chevy	DAY	LVS	CLT	ATL	HOM	POC	KEN	TEX	KAN	KAN	MCH	DAY; 36	DOV	GTW	DAR	RCH	BRI	LVS	TAL	KAN	TEX	MAR	PHO	75th	5	

^{*} Season still in progress
^{1} Ineligible for series points
