= Bobby Kennedy (racing driver) =

American racing driver

- Born: Robert H. Kennedy; December 26, 1993 (age 32); Port Orange, Florida, U.S.

NASCAR FedEx Freight Truck Series career
- 1 race run over 1 year
- 2020 position: 76th
- Best finish: 76th (2020)
- First race: 2020 Sunoco 159 (Daytona RC)
Wins	Top tens	Poles
0	0	0
- Statistics up to date as of November 11, 2020.

Robert H. Kennedy (born December 26, 1993) is an American professional sports car racing driver in the Trans-Am Series for his family-owned Bobby Kennedy Racing. He has also raced in the NASCAR Gander RV & Outdoors Truck Series.

== Racing career ==
Kennedy and his Bobby Kennedy Racing team compete in the Trans-Am Series' TA2 class.

In August 2020, Kennedy made his NASCAR Gander RV & Outdoors Truck Series debut on the Daytona International Speedway road course, driving the No. 00 Chevrolet Silverado for Reaume Brothers Racing.

== Personal life ==
Kennedy grew up in Brooksville, Florida, and lives in Ormond Beach, Florida.

== Motorsports career results ==
=== NASCAR ===
(key) (Bold – Pole position awarded by qualifying time. Italics – Pole position earned by points standings or practice time. * – Most laps led.)

==== Gander RV & Outdoors Truck Series ====
NASCAR Gander RV & Outdoors Truck Series results
Year	Team	No.	Make	1	2	3	4	5	6	7	8	9	10	11	12	13	14	15	16	17	18	19	20	21	22	23	NGTC	Pts	Ref
2020	Reaume Brothers Racing	00	Chevy	DAY	LVS	CLT	ATL	HOM	POC	KEN	TEX	KAN	KAN	MCH	DAY; 37	DOV	GTW	DAR	RCH	BRI	LVS	TAL	KAN	TEX	MAR	PHO	76th	5	
