= Matt Gould (racing driver) =

American racing driver (born 2006)

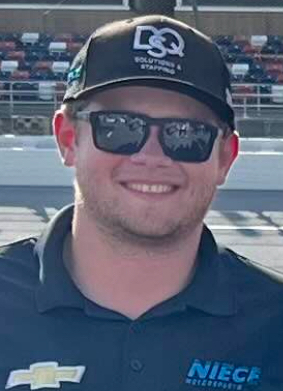
- Gould at Talladega Superspeedway in 2025
- Born: Matthew Michael Gould; January 8, 2006 (age 20); Mooresville, North Carolina, U.S.
- Achievements: 2026 Throwback Classic LMSC Winner

NASCAR FedEx Freight Truck Series career
- 4 races run over 2 years
- 2025 position: 53rd
- Best finish: 53rd (2025)
- First race: 2024 LiUNA! 175 (Milwaukee)
- Last race: 2025 eero 250 (Richmond)
Wins	Top tens	Poles
0	0	0

ARCA Menards Series career
- 3 races run over 2 years
- Best finish: 49th (2022)
- First race: 2022 Sprecher 150 (Milwaukee)
- Last race: 2023 Bush's Beans 200 (Bristol)
Wins	Top tens	Poles
0	2	0

ARCA Menards Series East career
- 2 races run over 2 years
- Best finish: 47th (2022)
- First race: 2022 Sprecher 150 (Milwaukee)
- Last race: 2023 Bush's Beans 200 (Bristol)
Wins	Top tens	Poles
0	1	0
- Statistics up to date as of August 9, 2026.

Matthew Michael Gould (born January 8, 2006) is an American professional stock car racing driver. He currently competes in the CARS Late Model Stock Car Tour, driving the No. 4 Chevrolet Camaro for Niece Motorsports. He has previously competed in the NASCAR Craftsman Truck Series, the ARCA Menards Series, and the ARCA Menards Series East.

== Racing career ==
In 2019, Gould would compete in the Allison Legacy Series, where he would run eight races and finish ninth in the final standings with a best finish of fourth at both Orange County Speedway events. He would make one more start in the series the following year, where he would finish fourth at Anderson Speedway.

Gould would then move to the NASCAR Late Model stock series, where he saw three wins in two years at Orange County Speedway, Florence Motor Speedway, and the Hickory Motor Speedway throughout 2021 and 2022.

In 2022, it was announced that Gould would make his debut in the ARCA Menards Series debut at the Milwaukee Mile, driving the No. 40 Chevrolet for Niece Motorsports. This also served as his ARCA Menards Series East debut, as it was a combination event with the main ARCA series. After qualifying twelfth, he would go on to finish one lap down in tenth position. It was later announced that Gould would compete in the season finale at Toledo Speedway, where he would start twelfth and go on to finish one lap down in eighth position.

In 2023, Gould would return to ARCA to run the race at Bristol Motor Speedway, driving the No. 42 Chevrolet for Cook Racing Technologies. After starting fifteenth, he would go on to finish 31st after running only twelve laps due to overheating issues.

On August 16, 2024, Niece Motorsports announced that Gould would make his Truck Series debut for them in the race at Milwaukee in their No. 44 truck. Unlike in his ARCA starts for the team, Gould would not be crew chiefed by his father Phil (who would stay with the No. 45 truck) in this race and Tom Ackerman would be his crew chief instead.

== Personal life ==
Gould is the son of Phil Gould, who currently serves as the crew chief of the No. 45 truck for Niece Motorsports.

== Motorsports career results ==
=== Stock car career summary ===
Season	Series	Team	Races	Wins	Top 5	Top 10	Points	Position
2022	ARCA Menard Series East	Niece Motorsports	1	0	0	1	34	47th
2022	ARCA Menards Series	Niece Motorsports	2	0	0	2	70	49th
2023	CARS Late Model Stock Car Tour	Derek Peebles Motorsports	1	0	0	0	9	77th
2023	ARCA Menard Series East	Cook Racing Technologies	1	0	0	0	13	56th
2023	ARCA Menards Series	Cook Racing Technologies	1	0	0	0	13	117th
2024	NASCAR Craftsman Truck Series	Niece Motorsports	2	0	0	0	14	63rd
2025	CARS Pro Late Model Tour	Fab Specialties	1	0	0	0	23	75th
2025	NASCAR Craftsman Truck Series	Niece Motorsports	2	0	0	0	26	53rd
2026	CARS Late Model Stock Car Tour	Niece Motorsports	6	1	1	3	161	24th

=== NASCAR ===
(key) (Bold – Pole position awarded by qualifying time. Italics – Pole position earned by points standings or practice time. * – Most laps led.)

==== Craftsman Truck Series ====
NASCAR Craftsman Truck Series results
Year	Team	No.	Make	1	2	3	4	5	6	7	8	9	10	11	12	13	14	15	16	17	18	19	20	21	22	23	24	25	NCTC	Pts	Ref
2024	Niece Motorsports	44	Chevy	DAY	ATL	LVS	BRI	COA	MAR	TEX	KAN	DAR	NWS	CLT	GTW	NSH	POC	IRP	RCH	MLW; 33	BRI	KAN	TAL	HOM	MAR; 27	PHO			63rd	14	
2025	Niece Motorsports	44	Chevy	DAY	ATL	LVS	HOM	MAR; 23	BRI	CAR	TEX	KAN	NWS	CLT	NSH	MCH	POC	LRP	IRP	GLN									53rd	26	
2025	Niece Motorsports	41	Chevy																		RCH; 25	DAR	BRI	NHA	ROV	TAL	MAR	PHO	53rd	26	

^{*} Season still in progress
^{1} Ineligible for series points

=== ARCA Menards Series ===
(key) (Bold – Pole position awarded by qualifying time. Italics – Pole position earned by points standings or practice time. * – Most laps led.)

ARCA Menards Series results
Year	Team	No.	Make	1	2	3	4	5	6	7	8	9	10	11	12	13	14	15	16	17	18	19	20	AMSC	Pts	Ref
2022	Niece Motorsports	40	Chevy	DAY	PHO	TAL	KAN	CLT	IOW	BLN	ELK	MOH	POC	IRP	MCH	GLN	ISF	MLW; 10	DSF	KAN	BRI	SLM	TOL; 8	49th	70	
2023	Cook Racing Technologies	42	Chevy	DAY	PHO	TAL	KAN	CLT	BLN	ELK	MOH	IOW	POC	MCH	IRP	GLN	ISF	MLW	DSF	KAN	BRI; 31	SLM	TOL	117th	13	

==== ARCA Menards Series East ====
ARCA Menards Series East results
Year	Team	No.	Make	1	2	3	4	5	6	7	8	AMSEC	Pts	Ref
2022	Niece Motorsports	40	Chevy	NSM	FIF	DOV	NSV	IOW	MLW; 10	BRI		47th	34	
2023	Cook Racing Technologies	42	Chevy	FIF	DOV	NSV	FRS	IOW	IRP	MLW	BRI; 31	56th	13	

=== CARS Late Model Stock Car Tour ===
(key) (Bold – Pole position awarded by qualifying time. Italics – Pole position earned by points standings or practice time. * – Most laps led. ** – All laps led.)

CARS Late Model Stock Car Tour results
Year	Team	No.	Make	1	2	3	4	5	6	7	8	9	10	11	12	13	14	15	16	CLMSCTC	Pts	Ref
2023	Derek Peebles Motorsports	45	Chevy	SNM	FLC	HCY	ACE	NWS	LGY	DOM	CRW; 24	HCY	ACE	TCM	WKS	AAS	SBO	TCM	CRW	77th	9	
2026	Niece Motorsports	4G	Chevy	SNM	WCS	NSV	CRW; 28	ACE	LGY; 27	DOM; 10	NWS	HCY; 1	AND	FLC; 21	TCM; 9	NPS	SBO			24th	161	

=== CARS Pro Late Model Tour ===
(key)

CARS Pro Late Model Tour results
Year	Team	No.	Make	1	2	3	4	5	6	7	8	9	10	11	12	13	CPLMTC	Pts	Ref
2025	Fab Specialties	17	N/A	AAS	CDL	OCS	ACE	NWS	CRW	HCY	HCY	AND	FLC	SBO	TCM; 19	NWS	75th	23	
