= 2023 Heart of America 200 =

8th race of the 2023 NASCAR Craftsman Truck Series

Race details
- Race 8 of 23 of the 2023 NASCAR Craftsman Truck Series
- Date: May 6, 2023
- Official name: 23rd Annual Heart of America 200
- Location: Kansas Speedway, Kansas City, Kansas
- Course: Permanent racing facility
- Course length: 1.5 miles (2.4 km)
- Distance: 134 laps, 250 mi (403 km)
- Scheduled distance: 134 laps, 250 mi (403 km)
- Average speed: 101.005 mph (162.552 km/h)

Pole position
Driver	Christian Eckes	McAnally-Hilgemann Racing
- Time: 30.932

Most laps led
Driver	Grant Enfinger	GMS Racing
- Laps: 65

Winner
No. 23	Grant Enfinger	GMS Racing

Television in the United States
- Network: FS1
- Announcers: Adam Alexander, Kevin Harvick, and Michael Waltrip

Radio in the United States
- Radio: MRN

The 2023 Heart of America 200 was the 8th stock car race of the 2023 NASCAR Craftsman Truck Series, and the 23rd iteration of the event. The race was held on Saturday, May 6, 2023, in Kansas City, Kansas at Kansas Speedway, a 1.5 miles (2.4 km) permanent tri-oval shaped racetrack. The race took the scheduled 134 laps to complete. Grant Enfinger, driving for GMS Racing, would make a three-wide pass for the lead with 30 laps to go, and eventually held on to score his eighth career NASCAR Craftsman Truck Series win, and his first of the season. Enfinger also dominated a portion of the race, leading a race-high 65 laps. To fill out the podium, Corey Heim, driving for Tricon Garage, and Zane Smith, driving for Front Row Motorsports, would finish 2nd and 3rd, respectively.

== Background ==
Kansas Speedway is a 1.5-mile (2.4 km) tri-oval race track in Kansas City, Kansas. It was built in 2001 and hosts two annual NASCAR race weekends. The NTT IndyCar Series also raced there until 2011. The speedway is owned and operated by the International Speedway Corporation.

=== Entry list ===
- (R) denotes rookie driver.
- (i) denotes driver who is ineligible for series driver points.

#	Driver	Team	Make
1	Toni Breidinger	Tricon Garage	Toyota
02	Kris Wright	Young's Motorsports	Chevrolet
2	Nick Sanchez (R)	Rev Racing	Chevrolet
04	Johnny Sauter	Roper Racing	Ford
4	Chase Purdy	Kyle Busch Motorsports	Chevrolet
5	Dean Thompson	Tricon Garage	Toyota
9	Colby Howard	CR7 Motorsports	Chevrolet
11	Corey Heim	Tricon Garage	Toyota
12	Spencer Boyd	Young's Motorsports	Chevrolet
13	Hailie Deegan	ThorSport Racing	Ford
15	Tanner Gray	Tricon Garage	Toyota
16	Tyler Ankrum	Hattori Racing Enterprises	Toyota
17	Taylor Gray (R)	Tricon Garage	Toyota
19	Christian Eckes	McAnally-Hilgemann Racing	Chevrolet
20	Nick Leitz	Young's Motorsports	Chevrolet
22	Josh Reaume	AM Racing	Ford
23	Grant Enfinger	GMS Racing	Chevrolet
24	Rajah Caruth (R)	GMS Racing	Chevrolet
25	Matt DiBenedetto	Rackley WAR	Chevrolet
32	Bret Holmes (R)	Bret Holmes Racing	Chevrolet
33	Mason Maggio	Reaume Brothers Racing	Ford
35	Jake Garcia (R)	McAnally-Hilgemann Racing	Chevrolet
38	Zane Smith	Front Row Motorsports	Ford
41	Ross Chastain (i)	Niece Motorsports	Chevrolet
42	Carson Hocevar	Niece Motorsports	Chevrolet
43	Daniel Dye (R)	GMS Racing	Chevrolet
45	Lawless Alan	Niece Motorsports	Chevrolet
46	Brennan Poole (i)	G2G Racing	Toyota
47	Tim Viens	G2G Racing	Toyota
51	Kyle Busch (i)	Kyle Busch Motorsports	Chevrolet
52	Stewart Friesen	Halmar Friesen Racing	Toyota
56	Tyler Hill	Hill Motorsports	Toyota
88	Matt Crafton	ThorSport Racing	Ford
90	Justin Carroll	TC Motorsports	Toyota
98	Ty Majeski	ThorSport Racing	Ford
99	Ben Rhodes	ThorSport Racing	Ford
Official entry list

== Practice ==
The first and only practice session was held on Saturday, May 6, at 11:05 AM CST, and would last for 20 minutes. Christian Eckes, driving for McAnally-Hilgemann Racing, would set the fastest time in the session, with a lap of 31.084, and an average speed of 173.723 mph (279.580 km/h).

Pos.	#	Driver	Team	Make	Time	Speed
1	19	Christian Eckes	McAnally-Hilgemann Racing	Chevrolet	31.084	173.723
2	41	Ross Chastain (i)	Niece Motorsports	Chevrolet	31.290	172.579
3	43	Daniel Dye (R)	GMS Racing	Chevrolet	31.313	172.452
Full practice results

== Qualifying ==
Qualifying was held on Saturday, May 6, at 11:35 AM CST. Since Kansas Speedway is an intermediate racetrack, the qualifying system used is a single-car, single-lap system with only one round. In that round, whoever sets the fastest time will win the pole. Christian Eckes, driving for McAnally-Hilgemann Racing, would score the pole for the race, with a lap of 30.932, and an average speed of 174.576 mph (280.953 km/h). No driver would fail to qualify.

Pos.	#	Driver	Team	Make	Time	Speed
1	19	Christian Eckes	McAnally-Hilgemann Racing	Chevrolet	30.932	174.576
2	51	Kyle Busch (i)	Kyle Busch Motorsports	Chevrolet	31.035	173.997
3	4	Chase Purdy	Kyle Busch Motorsports	Chevrolet	31.046	173.935
4	35	Jake Garcia (R)	McAnally-Hilgemann Racing	Chevrolet	31.057	173.874
5	99	Ben Rhodes	ThorSport Racing	Ford	31.154	173.332
6	2	Nick Sanchez (R)	Rev Racing	Chevrolet	31.159	173.305
7	38	Zane Smith	Front Row Motorsports	Ford	31.176	173.210
8	15	Tanner Gray	Tricon Garage	Toyota	31.189	173.138
9	98	Ty Majeski	ThorSport Racing	Ford	31.196	173.099
10	43	Daniel Dye (R)	GMS Racing	Chevrolet	31.258	172.756
11	23	Grant Enfinger	GMS Racing	Chevrolet	31.273	172.673
12	11	Corey Heim	Tricon Garage	Toyota	31.303	172.507
13	24	Rajah Caruth (R)	GMS Racing	Chevrolet	31.330	172.359
14	52	Stewart Friesen	Halmar Friesen Racing	Toyota	31.357	172.210
15	9	Colby Howard	CR7 Motorsports	Chevrolet	31.361	172.188
16	13	Hailie Deegan	ThorSport Racing	Ford	31.369	172.144
17	41	Ross Chastain (i)	Niece Motorsports	Chevrolet	31.384	172.062
18	25	Matt DiBenedetto	Rackley WAR	Chevrolet	31.421	171.860
19	17	Taylor Gray (R)	Tricon Garage	Toyota	31.435	171.783
20	42	Carson Hocevar	Niece Motorsports	Chevrolet	31.476	171.559
21	88	Matt Crafton	ThorSport Racing	Ford	31.514	171.352
22	5	Dean Thompson	Tricon Garage	Toyota	31.550	171.157
23	16	Tyler Ankrum	Hattori Racing Enterprises	Toyota	31.693	170.385
24	1	Toni Breidinger	Tricon Garage	Toyota	31.782	169.907
25	02	Kris Wright	Young's Motorsports	Chevrolet	32.041	168.534
26	46	Brennan Poole (i)	G2G Racing	Toyota	32.136	168.036
27	04	Johnny Sauter	Roper Racing	Ford	32.140	168.015
28	32	Bret Holmes (R)	Bret Holmes Racing	Chevrolet	32.341	166.971
29	22	Josh Reaume	AM Racing	Ford	32.461	166.353
30	56	Tyler Hill	Hill Motorsports	Toyota	32.665	165.315
31	20	Nick Leitz	Young's Motorsports	Chevrolet	32.884	164.214
Qualified by owner's points
32	90	Justin Carroll	TC Motorsports	Toyota	33.045	163.414
33	33	Mason Maggio	Reaume Brothers Racing	Ford	33.103	163.127
34	45	Lawless Alan	Niece Motorsports	Chevrolet	33.330	162.016
35	47	Tim Viens	G2G Racing	Toyota	38.521	140.183
36	12	Spencer Boyd	Young's Motorsports	Chevrolet	–	–
Official qualifying results
Official starting lineup

== Race results ==
Stage 1 Laps: 30

Pos.	#	Driver	Team	Make	Pts
1	51	Kyle Busch (i)	Kyle Busch Motorsports	Chevrolet	0
2	99	Ben Rhodes	ThorSport Racing	Ford	9
3	38	Zane Smith	Front Row Motorsports	Ford	8
4	23	Grant Enfinger	GMS Racing	Chevrolet	7
5	4	Chase Purdy	Kyle Busch Motorsports	Chevrolet	6
6	24	Rajah Caruth (R)	GMS Racing	Chevrolet	5
7	16	Tyler Ankrum	Hattori Racing Enterprises	Toyota	4
8	11	Corey Heim	Tricon Garage	Toyota	3
9	42	Carson Hocevar	Niece Motorsports	Chevrolet	2
10	13	Hailie Deegan	ThorSport Racing	Ford	1

Stage 2 Laps: 30

Pos.	#	Driver	Team	Make	Pts
1	98	Ty Majeski	ThorSport Racing	Ford	10
2	23	Grant Enfinger	GMS Racing	Chevrolet	9
3	11	Corey Heim	Tricon Garage	Toyota	8
4	24	Rajah Caruth (R)	GMS Racing	Chevrolet	7
5	38	Zane Smith	Front Row Motorsports	Ford	6
6	19	Christian Eckes	McAnally-Hilgemann Racing	Chevrolet	5
7	16	Tyler Ankrum	Hattori Racing Enterprises	Toyota	4
8	4	Chase Purdy	Kyle Busch Motorsports	Chevrolet	3
9	52	Stewart Friesen	Halmar Friesen Racing	Toyota	2
10	5	Dean Thompson	Tricon Garage	Toyota	1

Stage 3 Laps: 74

Fin	St	#	Driver	Team	Make	Laps	Led	Status	Pts
1	11	23	Grant Enfinger	GMS Racing	Chevrolet	134	65	Running	56
2	12	11	Corey Heim	Tricon Garage	Toyota	134	13	Running	46
3	7	38	Zane Smith	Front Row Motorsports	Ford	134	6	Running	48
4	14	52	Stewart Friesen	Halmar Friesen Racing	Toyota	134	1	Running	35
5	17	41	Ross Chastain (i)	Niece Motorsports	Chevrolet	134	0	Running	32
6	6	2	Nick Sanchez (R)	Rev Racing	Chevrolet	134	0	Running	31
7	2	51	Kyle Busch (i)	Kyle Busch Motorsports	Chevrolet	134	11	Running	40
8	4	35	Jake Garcia (R)	McAnally-Hilgemann Racing	Chevrolet	134	0	Running	29
9	19	17	Taylor Gray (R)	Tricon Garage	Toyota	134	0	Running	28
10	23	16	Tyler Ankrum	Hattori Racing Enterprises	Toyota	134	0	Running	35
11	21	88	Matt Crafton	ThorSport Racing	Ford	134	0	Running	26
12	16	13	Hailie Deegan	ThorSport Racing	Ford	134	0	Running	26
13	10	43	Daniel Dye (R)	GMS Racing	Chevrolet	133	0	Running	24
14	28	32	Bret Holmes (R)	Bret Holmes Racing	Chevrolet	133	0	Running	23
15	24	1	Toni Breidinger	Tricon Garage	Toyota	133	0	Running	22
16	5	99	Ben Rhodes	ThorSport Racing	Ford	133	17	Running	30
17	34	45	Lawless Alan	Niece Motorsports	Chevrolet	133	0	Running	20
18	8	15	Tanner Gray	Tricon Garage	Toyota	133	3	Running	19
19	27	04	Johnny Sauter	Roper Racing	Ford	133	0	Running	18
20	26	46	Brennan Poole (i)	G2G Racing	Toyota	133	0	Running	17
21	31	20	Nick Leitz	Young's Motorsports	Chevrolet	133	0	Running	16
22	30	56	Tyler Hill	Hill Motorsports	Toyota	132	0	Running	15
23	32	90	Justin Carroll	TC Motorsports	Toyota	132	0	Running	14
24	29	22	Josh Reaume	AM Racing	Ford	132	0	Running	13
25	9	98	Ty Majeski	ThorSport Racing	Ford	131	12	Running	22
26	36	12	Spencer Boyd	Young's Motorsports	Chevrolet	131	0	Running	11
27	33	33	Mason Maggio	Reaume Brothers Racing	Ford	131	0	Running	10
28	25	02	Kris Wright	Young's Motorsports	Chevrolet	91	0	Accident	9
29	18	25	Matt DiBenedetto	Rackley WAR	Chevrolet	81	0	DVP	8
30	1	19	Christian Eckes	McAnally-Hilgemann Racing	Chevrolet	78	6	Accident	12
31	20	42	Carson Hocevar	Niece Motorsports	Chevrolet	78	0	Accident	8
32	22	5	Dean Thompson	Tricon Garage	Toyota	78	0	Accident	6
33	3	4	Chase Purdy	Kyle Busch Motorsports	Chevrolet	78	0	Accident	13
34	13	24	Rajah Caruth (R)	GMS Racing	Chevrolet	72	0	Accident	15
35	15	9	Colby Howard	CR7 Motorsports	Chevrolet	55	0	Accident	2
36	35	47	Tim Viens	G2G Racing	Toyota	2	0	Transmission	0
Official race results

== Standings after the race ==
Drivers' Championship standings

	Pos	Driver	Points
1	1	Zane Smith	323
1	2	Ty Majeski	323 (-0)
	3	Ben Rhodes	282 (-41)
	4	Corey Heim	276 (-47)
1	5	Grant Enfinger	267 (-56)
1	6	Christian Eckes	241 (-82)
	7	Matt Crafton	235 (-88)
	8	Tanner Gray	220 (-103)
2	9	Nick Sanchez	205 (-118)
1	10	Matt DiBenedetto	193 (-130)
Official driver's standings

- Note: Only the first 10 positions are included for the driver standings.

Previous race: 2023 Long John Silver's 200	NASCAR Craftsman Truck Series; 2023 season	Next race: 2023 Buckle Up South Carolina 200
