= 2024 Zip Buy Now, Pay Later 200 =

22nd race of the 2024 NASCAR Craftsman Truck Series

Race details
- Race 22 of 23 of the 2024 NASCAR Craftsman Truck Series
- Date: November 1, 2024
- Official name: 5th Annual Zip Buy Now, Pay Later 200
- Location: Martinsville Speedway in Ridgeway, Virginia
- Course: Permanent racing facility
- Course length: 0.526 miles (0.847 km)
- Distance: 200 laps, 105 mi (169 km)
- Scheduled distance: 200 laps, 105 mi (169 km)
- Average speed: 65.613 mph (105.594 km/h)

Pole position
Driver	Christian Eckes	McAnally-Hilgemann Racing
- Time: 19.556

Most laps led
Driver	Christian Eckes	McAnally-Hilgemann Racing
- Laps: 187

Winner
No. 19	Christian Eckes	McAnally-Hilgemann Racing

Television in the United States
- Network: FS1
- Announcers: Jamie Little, Phil Parsons, and Michael Waltrip

Radio in the United States
- Radio: MRN

The 2024 Zip Buy Now, Pay Later 200 was the 22nd stock car race of the 2024 NASCAR Craftsman Truck Series, the sixth race of the Playoffs, the final race of the Round of 8, and the second iteration of the event. The race was held on Friday, November 1, 2024, at Martinsville Speedway in Ridgeway, Virginia, a 0.526 mi (0.847 km) permanent paper-clip shaped racetrack. The race took the scheduled 200 laps to complete. In a controversial ending, Christian Eckes, driving for McAnally-Hilgemann Racing, would make an aggressive move on Taylor Gray and Ben Rhodes in the final five laps, and held off the rest of the field to earn his ninth career NASCAR Craftsman Truck Series win, and his fourth of the season. Following the race, Gray confronted Eckes on the frontstretch, showing his displeasure with the final result. Eckes was the class of the field, winning the pole, both stages, and leading a race-high 187 laps. With his win, he would also clinch a spot in the Championship 4. To fill out the podium, Rhodes, driving for ThorSport Racing, and Chase Purdy, driving for Spire Motorsports, would finish 2nd and 3rd, respectively.

Following the race, Nick Sanchez, Gray, Rajah Caruth, and Tyler Ankrum were eliminated from playoff contention. Grant Enfinger, Eckes, Ty Majeski, and Corey Heim would advance into the Championship 4.

== Report ==
=== Background ===
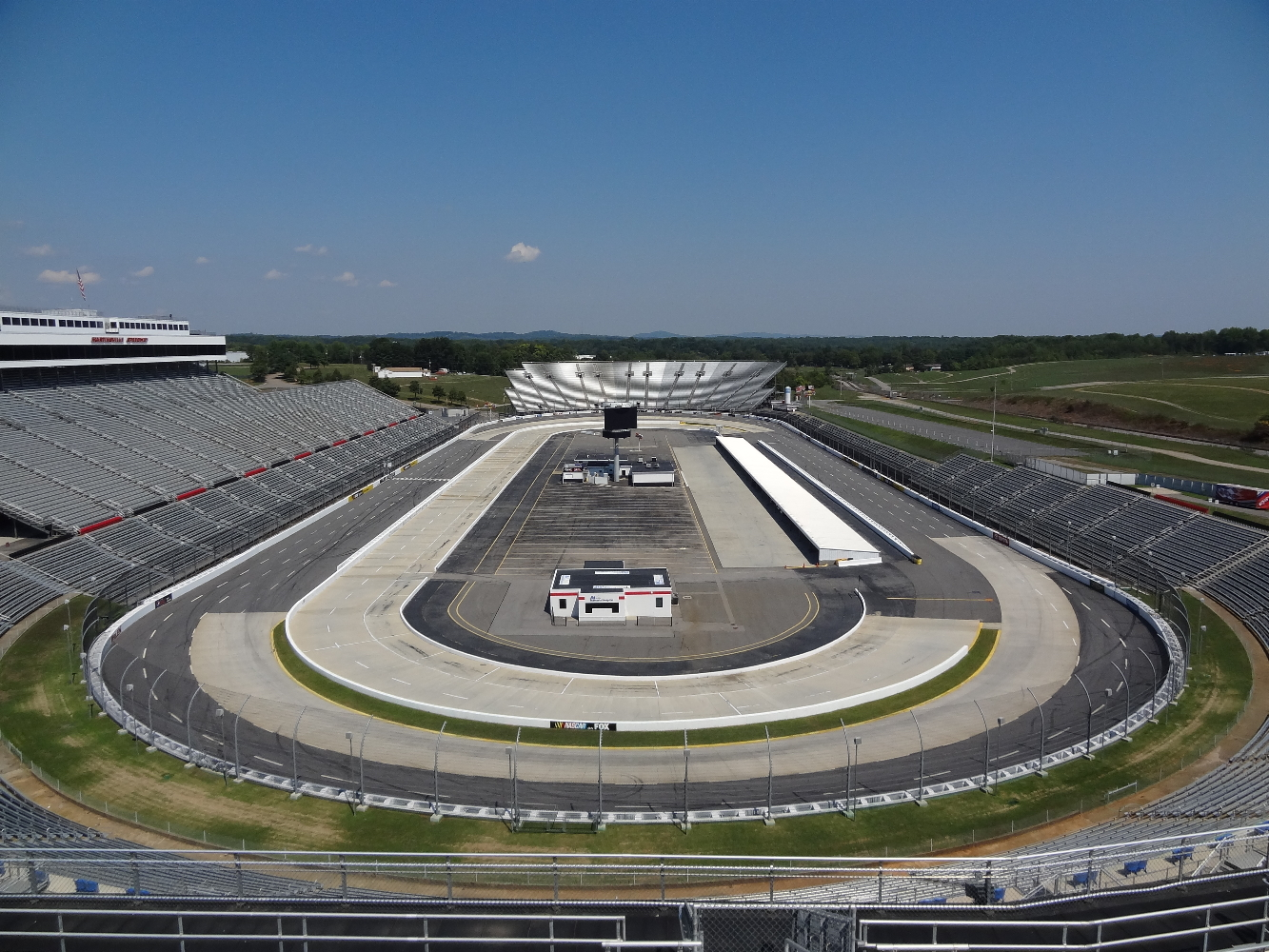
Martinsville Speedway, the circuit where the race was held.

Martinsville Speedway is a NASCAR-owned stock car racing track located in Henry County, in Ridgeway, Virginia, just to the south of Martinsville. At 0.526 miles (0.847 km) in length, it is the shortest track in the NASCAR Xfinity Series. The track was also one of the first paved oval tracks in NASCAR, being built in 1947 by H. Clay Earles. It is also the only remaining race track that has been on the NASCAR circuit from its beginning in 1948.

==== Entry list ====
- (R) denotes rookie driver.
- (i) denotes driver who is ineligible for series driver points.
- (P) denotes playoff driver.

#	Driver	Team	Make
1	William Sawalich	Tricon Garage	Toyota
02	Dylan Lupton (i)	Young's Motorsports	Chevrolet
2	Nick Sanchez (P)	Rev Racing	Chevrolet
4	Brett Moffitt	Hettinger Racing	Chevrolet
5	Dean Thompson	Tricon Garage	Toyota
6	Norm Benning	Norm Benning Racing	Chevrolet
7	Connor Zilisch (i)	Spire Motorsports	Chevrolet
9	Grant Enfinger (P)	CR7 Motorsports	Chevrolet
11	Corey Heim (P)	Tricon Garage	Toyota
13	Jake Garcia	ThorSport Racing	Ford
15	Tanner Gray	Tricon Garage	Toyota
16	Landen Lewis	Hattori Racing Enterprises	Toyota
17	Taylor Gray (P)	Tricon Garage	Toyota
18	Tyler Ankrum (P)	McAnally-Hilgemann Racing	Chevrolet
19	Christian Eckes (P)	McAnally-Hilgemann Racing	Chevrolet
22	Clayton Green	Reaume Brothers Racing	Ford
25	Dawson Sutton	Rackley W.A.R.	Chevrolet
27	Josh Reaume	Reaume Brothers Racing	Ford
33	Lawless Alan	Reaume Brothers Racing	Ford
38	Layne Riggs (R)	Front Row Motorsports	Ford
41	Bayley Currey	Niece Motorsports	Chevrolet
42	Matt Mills	Niece Motorsports	Chevrolet
43	Daniel Dye	McAnally-Hilgemann Racing	Chevrolet
44	Matt Gould	Niece Motorsports	Chevrolet
45	Kaden Honeycutt	Niece Motorsports	Chevrolet
52	Stewart Friesen	Halmar Friesen Racing	Toyota
56	Timmy Hill	Hill Motorsports	Toyota
66	Johnny Sauter	ThorSport Racing	Ford
71	Rajah Caruth (P)	Spire Motorsports	Chevrolet
76	Spencer Boyd	Freedom Racing Enterprises	Chevrolet
77	Chase Purdy	Spire Motorsports	Chevrolet
81	Corey Day	McAnally-Hilgemann Racing	Chevrolet
88	Matt Crafton	ThorSport Racing	Ford
90	Justin Carroll	TC Motorsports	Toyota
91	Jack Wood	McAnally-Hilgemann Racing	Chevrolet
98	Ty Majeski (P)	ThorSport Racing	Ford
99	Ben Rhodes	ThorSport Racing	Ford
Official entry list

== Practice ==
For practice, drivers were separated into two groups, Group A and B. Both sessions were 15 minutes long, and was held on Friday, November 1, at 1:35 PM EST. Christian Eckes, driving for McAnally-Hilgemann Racing, would set the fastest time between both sessions, with a lap of 20.140, and a speed of 94.022 mph (151.314 km/h).

Pos.	#	Driver	Team	Make	Time	Speed
1	19	Christian Eckes (P)	McAnally-Hilgemann Racing	Chevrolet	20.140	94.022
2	98	Ty Majeski (P)	ThorSport Racing	Ford	20.152	93.966
3	38	Layne Riggs (R)	Front Row Motorsports	Ford	20.164	93.910
Full practice results

== Qualifying ==
Qualifying was held on Friday, November 1, at 2:10 PM EST. Since Martinsville Speedway is a short track, the qualifying system used is a single-car, two-lap system with only one round. Drivers will be on track by themselves and will have two laps to post a qualifying time, and whoever sets the fastest time will win the pole.

Christian Eckes, driving for McAnally-Hilgemann Racing, would score the pole for the race, with a lap of 19.556, and a speed of 96.830 mph (155.833 km/h).

Josh Reaume withdrew prior to qualifying, bringing the number of entries down to 36. No drivers would fail to qualify.

=== Qualifying results ===
Pos.	#	Driver	Team	Make	Time	Speed
1	19	Christian Eckes (P)	McAnally-Hilgemann Racing	Chevrolet	19.556	96.830
2	98	Ty Majeski (P)	ThorSport Racing	Ford	19.561	96.805
3	17	Taylor Gray (P)	Tricon Garage	Toyota	19.571	96.755
4	2	Nick Sanchez (P)	Rev Racing	Chevrolet	19.617	96.529
5	38	Layne Riggs (R)	Front Row Motorsports	Ford	19.617	96.529
6	99	Ben Rhodes	ThorSport Racing	Ford	19.626	96.484
7	11	Corey Heim (P)	Tricon Garage	Toyota	19.633	96.450
8	77	Chase Purdy	Spire Motorsports	Chevrolet	19.646	96.386
9	45	Kaden Honeycutt	Niece Motorsports	Chevrolet	19.665	96.293
10	91	Jack Wood	McAnally-Hilgemann Racing	Chevrolet	19.705	96.097
11	71	Rajah Caruth (P)	Spire Motorsports	Chevrolet	19.769	95.786
12	1	William Sawalich	Tricon Garage	Toyota	19.800	95.636
13	66	Johnny Sauter	ThorSport Racing	Ford	19.816	95.559
14	16	Landen Lewis	Hattori Racing Enterprises	Toyota	19.827	95.506
15	15	Tanner Gray	Tricon Garage	Toyota	19.840	95.444
16	88	Matt Crafton	ThorSport Racing	Ford	19.845	95.420
17	5	Dean Thompson	Tricon Garage	Toyota	19.846	95.415
18	43	Daniel Dye	McAnally-Hilgemann Racing	Chevrolet	19.849	95.400
19	56	Timmy Hill	Hill Motorsports	Toyota	19.864	95.328
20	52	Stewart Friesen	Halmar Friesen Racing	Toyota	19.896	95.175
21	42	Matt Mills	Niece Motorsports	Chevrolet	19.928	95.022
22	44	Matt Gould	Niece Motorsports	Chevrolet	19.928	95.022
23	18	Tyler Ankrum (P)	McAnally-Hilgemann Racing	Chevrolet	19.932	95.003
24	25	Dawson Sutton	Rackley W.A.R.	Chevrolet	19.941	94.960
25	41	Bayley Currey	Niece Motorsports	Chevrolet	19.972	94.813
26	13	Jake Garcia	ThorSport Racing	Ford	19.989	94.732
27	7	Connor Zilisch (i)	Spire Motorsports	Chevrolet	20.019	94.590
28	4	Brett Moffitt	Hettinger Racing	Chevrolet	20.118	94.125
29	02	Dylan Lupton (i)	Young's Motorsports	Chevrolet	20.131	94.064
30	33	Lawless Alan	Reaume Brothers Racing	Ford	20.147	93.989
31	81	Corey Day	McAnally-Hilgemann Racing	Chevrolet	20.165	93.905
Qualified by owner's points
32	76	Spencer Boyd	Freedom Racing Enterprises	Chevrolet	20.213	93.682
33	9	Grant Enfinger (P)	CR7 Motorsports	Chevrolet	20.991	90.210
34	6	Norm Benning	Norm Benning Racing	Chevrolet	21.488	88.124
35	22	Clayton Green	Reaume Brothers Racing	Ford	21.869	86.588
36	90	Justin Carroll	TC Motorsports	Toyota	–	–
Withdrew
37	27	Josh Reaume	Reaume Brothers Racing	Ford	–	–
Official qualifying results
Official starting lineup

== Race results ==
Stage 1 Laps: 50

Pos.	#	Driver	Team	Make	Pts
1	19	Christian Eckes (P)	McAnally-Hilgemann Racing	Chevrolet	10
2	98	Ty Majeski (P)	ThorSport Racing	Ford	9
3	2	Nick Sanchez (P)	Rev Racing	Chevrolet	8
4	17	Taylor Gray (P)	Tricon Garage	Toyota	7
5	38	Layne Riggs (R)	Front Row Motorsports	Ford	6
6	11	Corey Heim (P)	Tricon Garage	Toyota	5
7	45	Kaden Honeycutt	Niece Motorsports	Chevrolet	4
8	77	Chase Purdy	Spire Motorsports	Chevrolet	3
9	1	William Sawalich	Tricon Garage	Toyota	2
10	7	Connor Zilisch (i)	Spire Motorsports	Chevrolet	0

Stage 2 Laps: 50

Pos.	#	Driver	Team	Make	Pts
1	19	Christian Eckes (P)	McAnally-Hilgemann Racing	Chevrolet	10
2	98	Ty Majeski (P)	ThorSport Racing	Ford	9
3	2	Nick Sanchez (P)	Rev Racing	Chevrolet	8
4	11	Corey Heim (P)	Tricon Garage	Toyota	7
5	1	William Sawalich	Tricon Garage	Toyota	6
6	52	Stewart Friesen	Halmar Friesen Racing	Toyota	5
7	99	Ben Rhodes	ThorSport Racing	Ford	4
8	45	Kaden Honeycutt	Niece Motorsports	Chevrolet	3
9	18	Tyler Ankrum (P)	McAnally-Hilgemann Racing	Chevrolet	2
10	9	Grant Enfinger (P)	CR7 Motorsports	Chevrolet	1

Stage 3 Laps: 100

Fin	St	#	Driver	Team	Make	Laps	Led	Status	Pts
1	1	19	Christian Eckes (P)	McAnally-Hilgemann Racing	Chevrolet	200	187	Running	60
2	6	99	Ben Rhodes	ThorSport Racing	Ford	200	12	Running	39
3	8	77	Chase Purdy	Spire Motorsports	Chevrolet	200	0	Running	37
4	3	17	Taylor Gray (P)	Tricon Garage	Toyota	200	1	Running	40
5	4	2	Nick Sanchez (P)	Rev Racing	Chevrolet	200	0	Running	48
6	5	38	Layne Riggs (R)	Front Row Motorsports	Ford	200	0	Running	37
7	7	11	Corey Heim (P)	Tricon Garage	Toyota	200	0	Running	42
8	23	18	Tyler Ankrum (P)	McAnally-Hilgemann Racing	Chevrolet	200	0	Running	31
9	33	9	Grant Enfinger (P)	CR7 Motorsports	Chevrolet	200	0	Running	29
10	20	52	Stewart Friesen	Halmar Friesen Racing	Toyota	200	0	Running	32
11	2	98	Ty Majeski (P)	ThorSport Racing	Ford	200	0	Running	44
12	27	7	Connor Zilisch (i)	Spire Motorsports	Chevrolet	200	0	Running	0
13	16	88	Matt Crafton	ThorSport Racing	Ford	200	0	Running	24
14	12	1	William Sawalich	Tricon Garage	Toyota	200	0	Running	31
15	24	25	Dawson Sutton	Rackley W.A.R.	Chevrolet	200	0	Running	22
16	25	41	Bayley Currey	Niece Motorsports	Chevrolet	200	0	Running	21
17	17	5	Dean Thompson	Tricon Garage	Toyota	200	0	Running	20
18	31	81	Corey Day	McAnally-Hilgemann Racing	Chevrolet	200	0	Running	19
19	21	42	Matt Mills	Niece Motorsports	Chevrolet	200	0	Running	18
20	26	13	Jake Garcia	ThorSport Racing	Ford	199	0	Running	17
21	19	56	Timmy Hill	Hill Motorsports	Toyota	198	0	Running	16
22	32	76	Spencer Boyd	Freedom Racing Enterprises	Chevrolet	198	0	Running	15
23	30	33	Lawless Alan	Reaume Brothers Racing	Ford	198	0	Running	14
24	35	22	Clayton Green	Reaume Brothers Racing	Ford	197	0	Running	13
25	36	90	Justin Carroll	TC Motorsports	Toyota	197	0	Running	12
26	10	91	Jack Wood	McAnally-Hilgemann Racing	Chevrolet	196	0	Running	11
27	22	44	Matt Gould	Niece Motorsports	Chevrolet	195	0	Running	10
28	13	66	Johnny Sauter	ThorSport Racing	Ford	194	0	Accident	9
29	15	15	Tanner Gray	Tricon Garage	Toyota	182	0	Accident	8
30	28	4	Brett Moffitt	Hettinger Racing	Chevrolet	181	0	Accident	7
31	11	71	Rajah Caruth (P)	Spire Motorsports	Chevrolet	179	0	Running	6
32	18	43	Daniel Dye	McAnally-Hilgemann Racing	Chevrolet	166	0	Brakes	5
33	9	45	Kaden Honeycutt	Niece Motorsports	Chevrolet	162	0	Accident	11
34	29	02	Dylan Lupton (i)	Young's Motorsports	Chevrolet	96	0	Accident	0
35	14	16	Landen Lewis	Hattori Racing Enterprises	Toyota	82	0	Brakes	2
36	34	6	Norm Benning	Norm Benning Racing	Chevrolet	17	0	Brakes	1
Official race results

== Standings after the race ==
Drivers' Championship standings

	Pos	Driver	Points
1	1	Grant Enfinger	4,000
1	2	Christian Eckes	4,000 (-0)
1	3	Ty Majeski	4,000 (–0)
3	4	Corey Heim	4,000 (–0)
3	5	Nick Sanchez	2,233 (–1,767)
	6	Taylor Gray	2,213 (–1,787)
2	7	Rajah Caruth	2,189 (–1,811)
1	8	Tyler Ankrum	2,179 (–1,821)
	9	Daniel Dye	2,128 (–1,872)
	10	Ben Rhodes	2,121 (–1,879)
Official driver's standings

Manufacturers' Championship standings

Pos	Manufacturer	Points
1	Chevrolet	825
2	Toyota	769 (-56)
3	Ford	740 (–85)

- Note: Only the first 10 positions are included for the driver standings.

Previous race: 2024 Baptist Health 200	NASCAR Craftsman Truck Series; 2024 season	Next race: 2024 NASCAR Craftsman Truck Series Championship Race
