= Niece Motorsports =

American auto racing team

- Owner(s): Josh Morris; Greg Fowler
- Base: Salisbury, North Carolina
- Series: NASCAR Craftsman Truck Series; CARS Late Model Stock Tour
- Race drivers: Craftsman Truck Series: 4.Ricky Stenhouse Jr., Ben Maier, Ross Chastain, Connor Hall, Conner Jones (part-time); 42. Tyler Reif; 44. Andrés Pérez de Lara; 45. Landen Lewis; CARS Late Model Stock Cars: 4. Matt Gould, Connor Hall
- Manufacturer: Chevrolet
- Opened: 2016

Career
- Debut: Xfinity Series: 2018 Zippo 200 at The Glen (Watkins Glen); Craftsman Truck Series: 2016 Striping Technology 350 (Texas); ARCA Menards Series: 2021 General Tire #AnywhereIsPossible 200 (Pocono); ARCA Menards Series East: 2021 Shore Lunch 150 (Iowa); ARCA Menards Series West: 2022 General Tire 200 (Sonoma)
- Latest race: Xfinity Series: 2018 Zippo 200 at The Glen (Watkins Glen); Craftsman Truck Series: 2026 Craftsman 200 (Homestead); ARCA Menards Series: 2022 Shore Lunch 200 (Toledo); ARCA Menards Series East: 2022 Sprecher 150 (Milwaukee Mile); ARCA Menards Series West: 2022 Desert Diamond Casino West Valley 100 (Phoenix)
- Races competed: Total: 245; Xfinity Series: 1 Craftsman Truck Series: 233; ARCA Menards Series: 7 ARCA Menards Series East: 2 ARCA Menards Series West: 2
- Drivers' Championships: Total: 0 Xfinity Series: 0 Craftsman Truck Series: 0 ARCA Menards Series: 0 ARCA Menards Series East: 0 ARCA Menards Series West: 0
- Race victories: Total: 9 Xfinity Series: 0 Craftsman Truck Series: 9 ARCA Menards Series: 0 ARCA Menards Series East: 0 ARCA Menards Series West: 0
- Pole positions: Total: 2 Xfinity Series: 0 Craftsman Truck Series: 2 ARCA Menards Series: 0 ARCA Menards Series East: 0 ARCA Menards Series West: 0

Niece Motorsports is an American professional stock car racing team that currently competes in the NASCAR Craftsman Truck Series as well as in CARS Late Model Stock Tour. Owned by Josh Morris & Greg Fowler, they currently field four Chevrolet Silverados: the No. 4 part-time for multiple drivers, the No. 42 full-time for Tyler Reif, the No. 44 full-time for Andrés Pérez de Lara, and the No. 45 full-time for Landen Lewis.

== Xfinity Series ==
=== Car No. 17 history ===
In 2018, the team attempted to make their NASCAR Xfinity Series debut with Victor Gonzalez Jr. driving at Watkins Glen.

==== Car No. 17 results ====
Year	Driver	No.	Make	1	2	3	4	5	6	7	8	9	10	11	12	13	14	15	16	17	18	19	20	21	22	23	24	25	26	27	28	29	30	31	32	33	NXSC	Pts
2018	Victor Gonzalez Jr.	17	Chevy	DAY	ATL	LVS	PHO	CAL	TEX	BRI	RCH	TAL	DOV	CLT	POC	MCH	IOW	CHI	DAY	KEN	NHA	IOW	GLN; 31	MOH	BRI	ROA	DAR	IND	LVS	RCH	CLT	DOV	KAN	TEX	PHO	HOM	51st	6

== Craftsman Truck Series ==
=== Truck No. 4 history ===
For 2026, the No. 41 truck would be renumbered to the No. 4. On February 4, 2026 it was announced that Garrett Mitchell would begin testing at Rockingham Speedway to attempt to get approval to make his NASCAR Craftsman Truck Series debut in the No. 4 truck. He started 12th in the Fresh From Florida 250 but got loose off turn 4 on lap 6 and hit the inside wall finishing 37th. Mitchell would also drive the No. 4 at Michigan and Talladega. On February 20, 2026, it was announced that Ben Maier will drive the No. 4 at the St. Petersburg. On March 5, 2026, it was announced that Connor Hall would drive the No. 4 at Rockingham. Hall also drive the No. 4 at Richmond, New Hampshire, Bristol night race, Kansas, and Homestead Miami. Ricky Stenhouse Jr. would drive the No. 4 at Bristol. On April 16, 2026, it was announced that Donovan Strauss will attempt to make his debut in the NASCAR Craftsman Truck Series at North Wilkesboro Speedway, driving the No. 4 truck. He would also drive the No. 4 at Phoenix. On April 22, it was announced that Shane van Gisbergen would drive the No. 4 at Watkins Glen. On May 25, it was announced that Stefan Parsons would drive the No. 4 at Nashville. Matt Mills would drive the No. 4 at fall Charlotte race. Conner Jones would drive the No. 4 at Martinsville.

==== Truck No. 4 results ====
Year	Driver	No.	Make	1	2	3	4	5	6	7	8	9	10	11	12	13	14	15	16	17	18	19	20	21	22	23	24	25	Owners	Pts
2026	Garrett Mitchell	4	Chevy	DAY; 37	ATL										MCH; 25	COR	LRP									TAL; 36			33rd	242
2026	Ben Maier	4	Chevy			STP; 11	DAR																						33rd	242
2026	Connor Hall	4	Chevy					ROC; 20												RCH; 28	NHA; 22	BRI; 29	KAN; 32					HOM; 18	33rd	242
2026	Ricky Stenhouse Jr.	4	Chevy						BRI; 26	TEX			CLT; 9																33rd	242
2026	Shane van Gisbergen	4	Chevy								GLN; 3	DOV																	33rd	242
2026	Stefan Parsons	4	Chevy											NSH; 18															33rd	242
2026	Donovan Strauss	4	Chevy															NWS; 36	IRP						PHO; 24				33rd	242
2026	Matt Mills	4	Chevy																					CLT; 23					33rd	242
2026	Conner Jones	4	Chevy																								MAR; 36		33rd	242

=== Truck No. 22 history ===
On October 30, 2017, it was announced that Austin Wayne Self moved to Niece Motorsports to drive the No. 22 truck full-time in 2018. After the 2018 season, it was announced that Self would go to AM Racing for the 2019 season.

==== Truck No. 22 results ====
Year	Driver	No.	Make	1	2	3	4	5	6	7	8	9	10	11	12	13	14	15	16	17	18	19	20	21	22	23	Owners	Pts	Ref
2018	Austin Wayne Self	22	Chevy	DAY; 20	ATL; 15	LVS; 16	MAR; 27	DOV; 15	KAN; 13	CLT; 27	TEX; 17	IOW; 15	GTW; 16	CHI; 13	KEN; 14	ELD; 18	POC; 18	MCH; 11	BRI; 13	MSP; 21	LVS; 9	TAL; 12	MAR; 23	TEX; 16	PHO; 19	HOM; 23	12th	480	

=== Truck No. 38 history ===
In 2017, the No. 38 truck ran two races with T. J. Bell as a start and park team.

In 2018 the No. 38 truck planned to run at least four races with Max McLaughlin as the driver, starting at Eldora. McLaughlin qualified for the race and finished 12th in his NASCAR debut. However, the deal fell through and McLaughlin only ran at Eldora. Ross Chastain ran three races (Bristol, Texas in June and Homestead) with the best finish of twelfth at Bristol. Bell returned to the No. 38 in Las Vegas in September and finished 21st due to a crash. Landon Huffman also drove for the team, he failed to qualify at Martinsville in October and finished 25th at Phoenix.

In 2019, Bell returned once again to the No. 38 as a field-filler at Kansas, since only thirty trucks showed up. Chastain drove the No. 38 with sponsorship from TruNorth Global at Texas in June and finished tenth.

==== Truck No. 38 results ====
Year	Driver	No.	Make	1	2	3	4	5	6	7	8	9	10	11	12	13	14	15	16	17	18	19	20	21	22	23	Owners	Pts
2017	T. J. Bell	38	Chevy	DAY	ATL	MAR	KAN	CLT	DOV	TEX	GTW	IOW; 29	KEN	ELD	POC	MCH	BRI	MSP	CHI	NHA	LVS; 24	TAL	MAR	TEX	PHO	HOM	47th	21
2018	Max McLaughlin	38	Chevy	DAY	ATL	LVS	MAR	DOV	KAN	CLT	TEX	IOW	GTW	CHI	KEN	ELD; 12	POC	MCH									35th	115
2018	Ross Chastain	38	Chevy																BRI; 12	MSP				TEX; 26		HOM; 16	35th	115
2018	T. J. Bell	38	Chevy																		LVS; 21	TAL					35th	115
2018	Landon Huffman	38	Chevy																				MAR; DNQ		PHO; 25		35th	115
2019	T. J. Bell	38	Chevy	DAY	ATL	LVS	MAR	TEX	DOV	KAN; 26	CLT						POC; 26		MCH; 29	BRI	MSP						37th	106
2019	Ross Chastain	38	Chevy									TEX; 10	IOW	GTW	CHI	KEN											37th	106
2019	Mark Smith	38	Chevy															ELD; 15									37th	106
2019	Colin Garrett	38	Chevy																			LVS; 21	TAL	MAR	PHO	HOM	37th	106

=== Truck No. 40 history ===
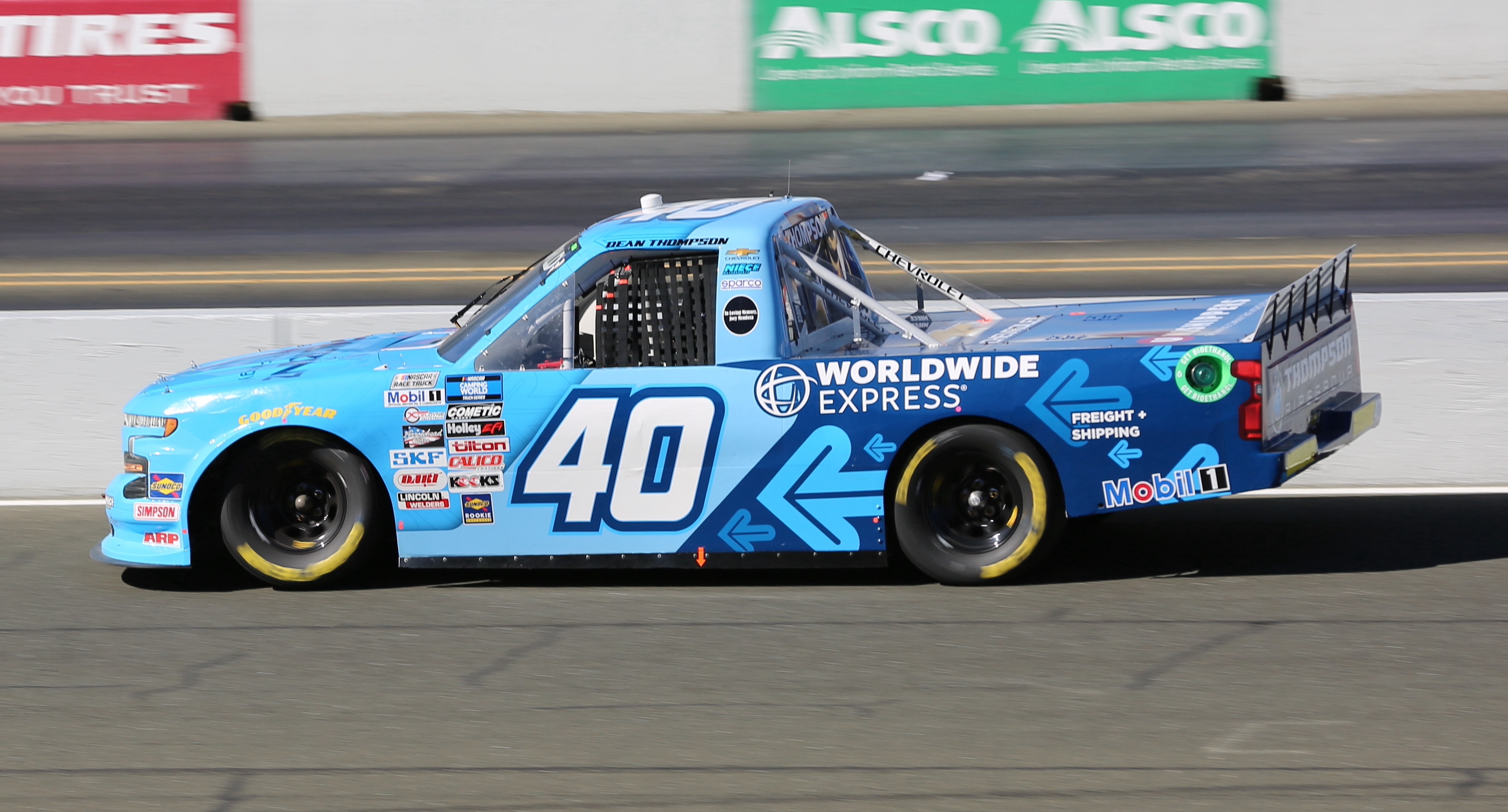
Dean Thompson in the No. 40 at Sonoma in 2022

In 2020, the team fielded the No. 40 and it was shared by Ross Chastain, Garrett Smithley, Ryan Truex, T. J. Bell, Travis Pastrana, Carson Hocevar, Trevor Bayne, and Bayley Currey.

In 2021, Truex returned to the No. 40 for full-time schedule.

In 2022, Dean Thompson would drive this truck full-time. However, it was announced on December 5, 2022, that Thompson would not return to Niece Motorsports. Instead, he would drive the No. 5 for Tricon Garage in the 2023 season.

==== Truck No. 40 results ====
Year	Driver	No.	Make	1	2	3	4	5	6	7	8	9	10	11	12	13	14	15	16	17	18	19	20	21	22	23	Owners	Pts
2020	Ross Chastain	40	Chevy	DAY; 8	LVS; 14				POC; 6			KAN; 34															19th	422
2020	Garrett Smithley	40	Chevy			CLT; 36																					19th	422
2020	Ryan Truex	40	Chevy				ATL; 13			KEN; 27	TEX; 13			MCH; 19							LVS; 12		KAN; 12	TEX; 34	MAR; 30	PHO; 21	19th	422
2020	T. J. Bell	40	Chevy					HOM; 35																			19th	422
2020	Travis Pastrana	40	Chevy										KAN; 22														19th	422
2020	Carson Hocevar	40	Chevy												DAY; 28	DOV; 12	GTW; 15		RCH; 22	BRI; 17							19th	422
2020	Trevor Bayne	40	Chevy															DAR; 27									19th	422
2020	Bayley Currey	40	Chevy																			TAL; 15					19th	422
2021	Ryan Truex	40	Chevy	DAY; 4	DAY; 31	LVS; 38	ATL; 15	BRI; 20	RCH; 40	KAN; 20	DAR; 11	COA; 20	CLT; 12	TEX; 16	NSH; 26	POC; 18	KNX; 13	GLN; 17	GTW; 13	DAR; 33	BRI; 16	LVS; 9	TAL; 5	MAR; 33	PHO; 19		16th	404
2022	Dean Thompson	40	Chevy	DAY; 36	LVS; 11	ATL; 34	COA; 29	MAR; 36	BRI; 16	DAR; 15	KAN; 22	TEX; 29	CLT; 28	GTW; 14	SON; 24	KNX; 23	NSH; 14	MOH; 27	POC; 24	IRP; 29	RCH; 35	KAN; 23	BRI; 32	TAL; 34	HOM; 23	PHO; 21	23rd	279

=== Truck No. 41 history ===
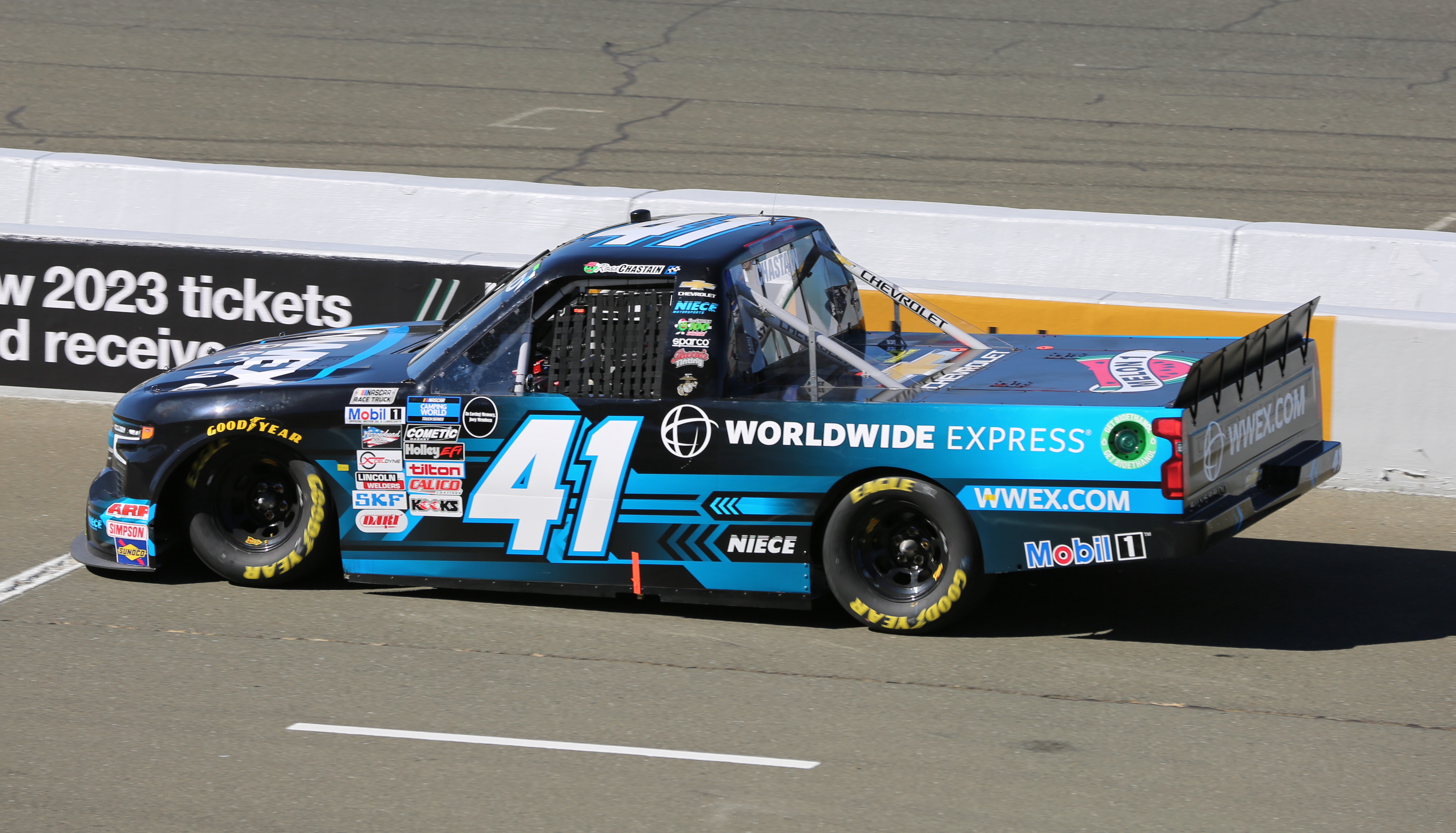
Ross Chastain in the No. 41 at Sonoma in 2022

In 2022, Ross Chastain would drive this fifth Niece Motorsports truck at Atlanta, Darlington, Texas, Charlotte, and Sonoma. He would win in the No. 41 truck at Charlotte. Later on, Tyler Carpenter would drive this truck at Knoxville after winning the Gateway Nationals. Justin Marks would race at Mid-Ohio. Chad Chastain would run the No. 41 truck at IRP.

The 2023 season would have the No. 41 truck rotating drivers, but the truck would run full-time Travis Pastrana would start the season off with a thirteenth-place finish at Daytona. Ross Chastain ran seven races, with his best result being 4th at the COTA. Bayley Currey would run most of the races in the No. 41 truck. He would finish fourth at Atlanta. Chad Chastain, Tyler Carpenter, Conor Daly, and Shane van Gisbergen would run one race each with this truck.

On October 26, 2023, it was announced that Bayley Currey would run the No. 41 full-time in the 2024 season.

The No. 41 truck was scaled back to a part–time schedule in 2025. Multiple drivers such as Matt Gould, Conner Jones, Josh Bilicki, and Tyler Reif made their starts in the No. 41 truck.

==== Truck No. 41 results ====
Year	Driver	No.	Make	1	2	3	4	5	6	7	8	9	10	11	12	13	14	15	16	17	18	19	20	21	22	23	24	25	Owners	Pts
2022	Ross Chastain	41	Chevy	DAY	LVS	ATL; 23	COA	MAR	BRI	DAR; 26	KAN	TEX; 12	CLT; 1	GTW	SON; 4														35th	171
2022	Tyler Carpenter	41	Chevy													KNO; 36	NSH												35th	171
2022	Justin Marks	41	Chevy															MOH; 31	POC										35th	171
2022	Chad Chastain	41	Chevy																	IRP; 30	RCH	KAN	BRI	TAL	HOM	PHO			35th	171
2023	Travis Pastrana	41	Chevy	DAY; 13																									17th	507
2023	Ross Chastain	41	Chevy		LVS; 24		COA; 4			MAR; 12	KAN; 5	DAR; 13	NWS; 9					POC; 30											17th	507
2023	Bayley Currey	41	Chevy			ATL; 4								CLT; 13	GTW; 17	NSH; 5			RCH; 18		MLW; 10	KAN; 21	BRI; 13	TAL; 31	HOM; 5	PHO; 31			17th	507
2023	Chad Chastain	41	Chevy					TEX; 34																					17th	507
2023	Tyler Carpenter	41	Chevy						BRD; 29																				17th	507
2023	Conor Daly	41	Chevy														MOH; 18												17th	507
2023	Shane van Gisbergen	41	Chevy																	IRP; 19									17th	507
2024	Bayley Currey	41	Chevy	DAY; 13	ATL; 30	LVS; 28	BRI; 11	COA; 16	MAR; 17	TEX; 14	KAN; 11	DAR; 22	NWS; 19	CLT; 26	GTW; 29	NSH; 29	POC; 17	IRP; 14	RCH; 23	MLW; 29		KAN; 8	TAL; 36	HOM; 31	MAR; 16	PHO; 21			18th	392
2024	Connor Mosack	41	Chevy																		BRI; 20								18th	392
2025	Matt Gould	41	Chevy	DAY	ATL	LVS	HOM	MAR	BRI	CAR	TEX	KAN	NWS	CLT	NSH	MCH	POC	LRP	IRP	GLN	RCH; 25	DAR							35th	114
2025	Conner Jones	41	Chevy																				BRI; 18	NHA; 31			MAR; 22		35th	114
2025	Josh Bilicki	41	Chevy																						ROV; 6	TAL			35th	114
2025	Tyler Reif	41	Chevy																									PHO; 9	35th	114

=== Truck No. 42 history ===
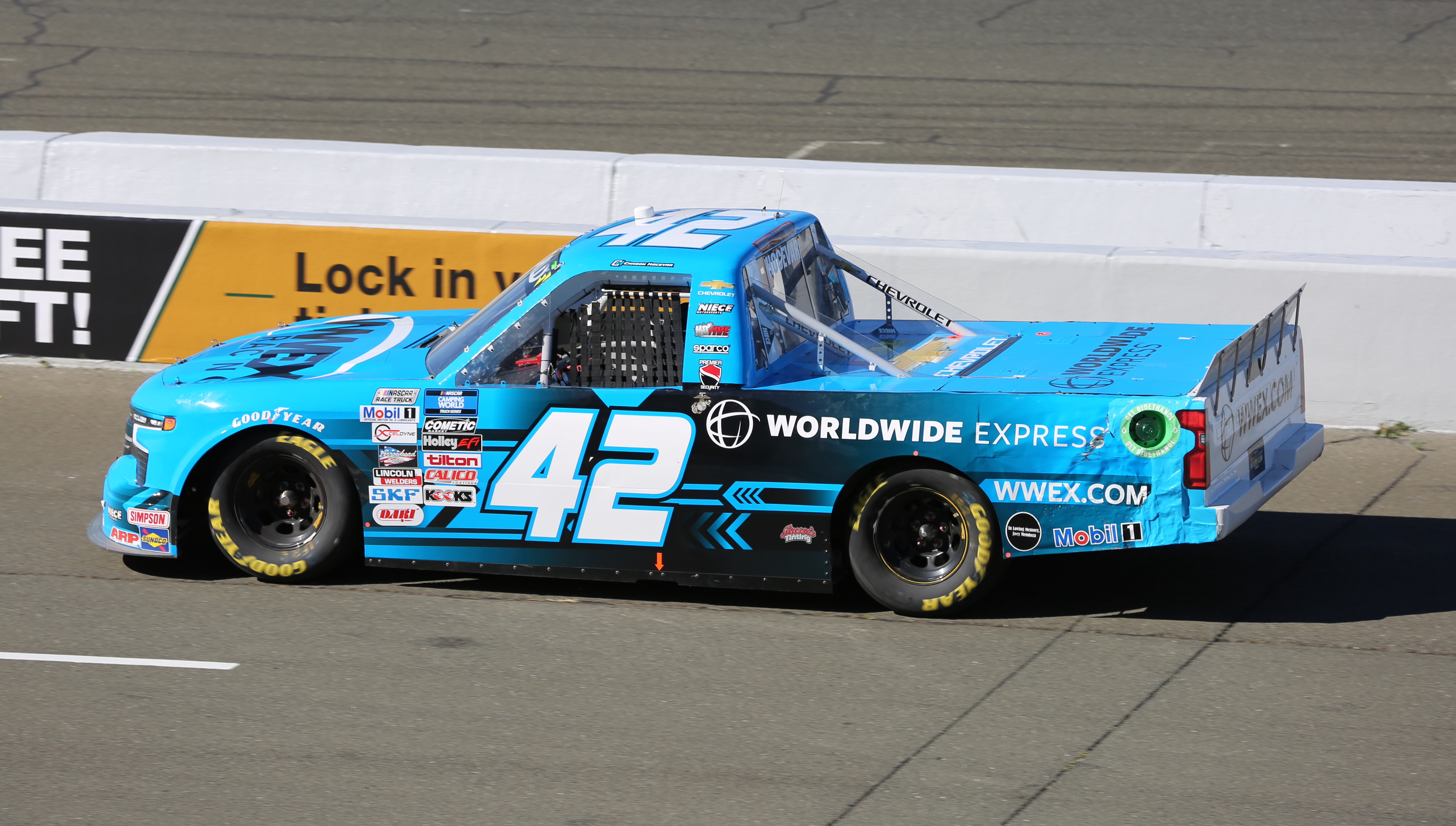
Daniel Suárez in the No. 42 at Sonoma in 2022

In 2020, Ross Chastain announced that he would drive the No. 42 part-time. Mark Smith, Conor Daly, James Buescher, and Carson Hocevar also drove this truck.

In 2021, Carson Hocevar announced that he would drive the No. 42 full-time. He returned to the 42 truck in 2022. On June 4, Hocevar was injured during the final lap of the Gateway race when his truck was broadsided by Tyler Hill. He underwent surgery on his tibia prior to the Sonoma race. Hocevar took the pole position before wrecking on turn 10. On lap eleven, he was relieved by Daniel Suárez, who took the No. 42 to a sixth-place finish.

Hocevar started the 2023 season with a twelfth-place finish at Daytona. He scored his first career win at Texas on double-overtime after race leader Nick Sanchez made contact with Zane Smith on the final lap and Hocevar spun Sanchez from behind. Hocevar also scored wins at Nashville and Richmond. He won at Homestead to make the Championship 4. Hocevar finished 29th at Phoenix after Corey Heim slammed him on the fourth turn wall in retaliation for spinning him earlier in the race; he also finished fourth in the final points standings. After Heim was penalized 25 driver points for intentionally wrecking him, Hocevar officially finished third in the points standings.

On October 12, 2023, Niece Motorsports announced that Matt Mills will drive the No. 42 full-time in 2024, as Hocevar would move up to the Cup Series in the Spire Motorsports No. 77. Mills was renewed for a second season in 2025. At 2024 Baptist Health 200, he was injured after Conner Jones intentionally sent him to the third turn wall.

Towards the end of the 2025 season, Landon Polinski was named crew chief of the No. 42 truck for the final 8 races of the season, starting at Darlington.

On November 19, 2025, it was announced that Tyler Reif would served as the anchor driver of the No. 42 in 2026. On December 1, 2025, it was announced that Conner Jones would drive the No. 42 part-time in 2026. Two days later, it was announced that Parker Eatmon would also drive the No. 42 part-time. On January 26, 2026, it was announced that Travis Pastrana would drive the No. 42 at Daytona. Ricky Stenhouse Jr. would drive the No. 42 at Michigan. Ben Maier would drive the No. 42 at Lime Rock.

==== Truck No. 42 results ====
Year	Driver	No.	Make	1	2	3	4	5	6	7	8	9	10	11	12	13	14	15	16	17	18	19	20	21	22	23	24	25	Owners	Pts
2020	Ross Chastain	42	Chevy	DAY	LVS	CLT; 11	ATL; 6	HOM	POC	KEN	TEX; 10	KAN	KAN	MCH						BRI; 8									33rd	214
2020	Mark Smith	42	Chevy												DAY; 36	DOV	GTW	DAR	RCH										33rd	214
2020	Conor Daly	42	Chevy																		LVS; 18	TAL	KAN						33rd	214
2020	James Buescher	42	Chevy																					TEX; 15					33rd	214
2020	Carson Hocevar	42	Chevy																						MAR; 13	PHO; 32			33rd	214
2021	Carson Hocevar	42	Chevy	DAY; 5	DAY; 14	LVS; 24	ATL; 12	BRI; 21	RCH; 12	KAN; 23	DAR; 3	COA; 7	CLT; 2	TEX; 11	NSH; 16	POC; 13	KNX; 16	GLN; 10	GTW; 8	DAR; 11	BRI; 6	LVS; 22	TAL; 25	MAR; 12	PHO; 9				10th	2204
2022	Carson Hocevar	42	Chevy	DAY; 9	LVS; 13	ATL; 27	COA; 8	MAR; 17	BRI; 2	DAR; 2	KAN; 15	TEX; 4	CLT; 16*	GTW; 24	SON; 6	KNX; 35*	NSH; 3	MOH; 3	POC; 5	IRP; 21	RCH; 10	KAN; 2	BRI; 19	TAL; 28	HOM; 12	PHO; 10			10th	2186
2023	Carson Hocevar	42	Chevy	DAY; 12	LVS; 7	ATL; 31	COA; 34	TEX; 1	BRI; 17	MAR; 34	KAN; 31	DAR; 5	NWS; 4	CLT; 4	GTW; 4	NSH; 1	MOH; 12	POC; 11	RCH; 1	IRP; 4	MLW; 2	KAN; 6	BRI; 4	TAL; 11	HOM; 1	PHO; 29			4th	4008
2024	Matt Mills	42	Chevy	DAY; 26	ATL; 27	LVS; 31	BRI; 25	COA; 24	MAR; 29	TEX; 26	KAN; 23	DAR; 11	NWS; 18	CLT; 4	GTW; 23	NSH; 8	POC; 11	IRP; 22	RCH; 35	MLW; 22	BRI; 25	KAN; 33	TAL; 31	HOM; 34	MAR; 19	PHO; 25			26th	328
2025	Matt Mills	42	Chevy	DAY; 29	ATL; 13	LVS; 16	HOM; 14	MAR; 15	BRI; 20	CAR; 30	TEX; 20	KAN; 12	NWS; 25	CLT; 7	NSH; 22	MCH; 23	POC; 20	LRP; 26	IRP; 21	GLN; 9	RCH; 17	DAR; 29	BRI; 16	NHA; 23	ROV; 17	TAL; 19	MAR; 27	PHO; 11	21st	453
2026	Travis Pastrana	42	Chevy	DAY; 15																									24th	397
2026	Tyler Reif	42	Chevy		ATL; 17	STP; 16			BRI; 34		GLN; 14			NSH; 36		COR; 19		NWS; 12							PHO; 27		MAR; 27	HOM; 21	24th	397
2026	Conner Jones	42	Chevy				DAR; 16			TEX; 33			CLT; 14											CLT; 34		TAL; 27			24th	397
2026	Parker Eatmon	42	Chevy					ROC; 26				DOV; 21							IRP; 12	RCH; 16	NHA; 10	BRI; 31	KAN; 22						24th	397
2026	Ricky Stenhouse Jr.	42	Chevy												MCH; 7														24th	397
2026	Ben Maier	42	Chevy														LRP; 33												24th	397

=== Truck No. 44 history ===
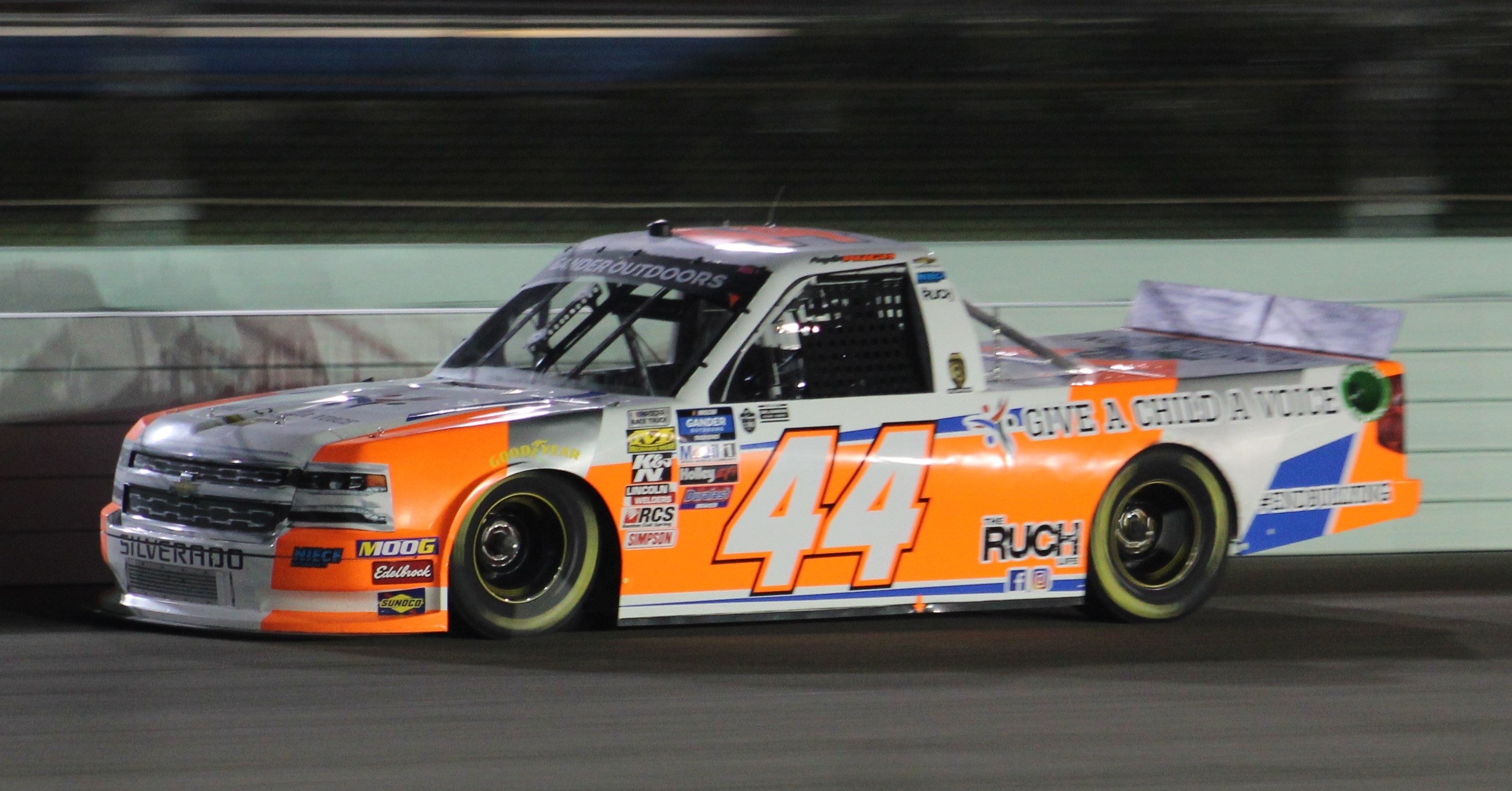
Angela Ruch in the No. 44 at Homestead in 2019

On January 31, 2019, Timothy Peters announced that he would join Niece for the first three events of the 2019 NASCAR Gander Outdoors Truck Series schedule. After two top-tens in his first two events, Peters said that there is the possibility to run more races with the team. Reid Wilson drove the No. 44 truck in two races (Martinsville in April and Dover) with a best finish of thirteenth at Dover. Angela Ruch was originally scheduled to drive the No. 44 truck in twelve races in 2019. Jeb Burton drove the truck in the July race at Kentucky. Ty Majeski drove the truck at Phoenix.

Natalie Decker signed with the team for the 2020 season. On February 14, 2020, she finished fifth at Daytona, becoming the highest-finishing female driver in Truck Series history. She missed the Pocono race after being hospitalized for bile duct complications related to her gall bladder surgery in December 2019. On September 25, Decker was not medically cleared to race at Las Vegas; because her truck had cleared inspection and was placed on the starting grid, she was credited with a last-place finish in the race.

In 2021, James Buescher raced at season opening at Daytona. Jett Noland drove at Daytona Road Course and Richmond. Conor Daly drove at Vegas. Logan Bearden failed to qualify at the Toyota Tundra 225 and Morgan Alexander crashed at the Corn Belt 150. Dean Thompson will race at the season finale before moving full-time to the team next year.

In 2022, Kris Wright would drive the No. 44 truck full-time. Wright was dropped from the team before the Richmond race, with Chad Chastain filling in for him.

On July 11, 2023, it was announced that Kaden Honeycutt would attempt to qualify for the Truck Series race at Pocono in the No. 44 truck. Chad Chastain would attempt to quality for the race in the No. 44 at IRP. However, he failed to quality for the race. Danny Bohn also failed to quality for the race at Bristol.

In 2024, Conor Daly was announced as the driver of the No. 44 for three races. On August 16, 2024, it was announced that Matt Gould would run the race at Milwaukee. Bayley Currey drove the No. 44 at Bristol to a 15th-place finish. Danny Bohn drove the No. 44 at Talladega. Stefan Parsons drove the No. 44 at season finale at Phoenix.

On December 16, 2024, it was announced that Christian Rose will run full-time in the NASCAR Craftsman Truck Series, driving the No. 44 Chevrolet. However, on February 10, 2025, it was announced that Rose would not run full-time in the Truck Series due to unforeseen sponsorship changes. As the result, Currey filled in for the first few races of the season. He would be in contention to win at Atlanta and would score his first career stage win at Bristol in April. Ross Chastain drove the No. 44 for five races started at Homestead. He also finished 2nd at Charlotte. Matt Gould drove the No. 44 to a 23rd place at Martinsville. Conner Jones drove the No. 44 for two races. Josh Bilicki drove the No. 44 to a 7th-place finish at Lime Rock Park. Andrés Pérez de Lara departed from Spire Motorsports after Watkins Glen ended up finishing the year driving the No. 44 truck.

On January 27, 2026, it was announced that Pérez de Lara would return to drive the No. 44 full-time.

==== Truck No. 44 results ====
Year	Driver	No.	Make	1	2	3	4	5	6	7	8	9	10	11	12	13	14	15	16	17	18	19	20	21	22	23	24	25	NCWTC	Pts
2019	Timothy Peters	44	Chevy	DAY; 7	ATL; 10	LVS; 12																							19th	404
2019	Reid Wilson	44	Chevy				MAR; 24		DOV; 28																				19th	404
2019	Angela Ruch	44	Chevy					TEX; 30		KAN; 16	CLT; 23	TEX; 29								BRI; 30		LVS; 22	TAL; 28			HOM; 29			19th	404
2019	Ross Chastain	44	Chevy										IOW; 32*																19th	404
2019	Kyle Benjamin	44	Chevy											GTW; 13															19th	404
2019	Spencer Davis	44	Chevy												CHI; 27														19th	404
2019	Jeb Burton	44	Chevy													KEN; 9								MAR; 9					19th	404
2019	Bayley Currey	44	Chevy														POC; 23		MCH; 6										19th	404
2019	Jeffrey Abbey	44	Chevy															ELD; 20											19th	404
2019	Gary Klutt	44	Chevy																		MSP; 12								19th	404
2019	Ty Majeski	44	Chevy																						PHO; 11				19th	404
2020	Natalie Decker	44	Chevy	DAY; 5	LVS; 21	CLT; 27				KEN; 29	TEX; 35	KAN; 21	KAN; 35		DAY; 20		GTW; 28		RCH; 34	BRI; 29	LVS; 36			TEX; 30	MAR; 27	PHO			21st	269
2020	Jeb Burton	44	Chevy				ATL; 16							MCH; 36															21st	269
2020	Ross Chastain	44	Chevy					HOM; 3																					21st	269
2020	Bayley Currey	44	Chevy						POC; 16							DOV; 18		DAR; 12											21st	269
2020	Kaz Grala	44	Chevy																			TAL; 9							21st	269
2020	Colin Garrett	44	Chevy																				KAN; 24						21st	269
2021	James Buescher	44	Chevy	DAY; 36																									43rd	63
2021	Jett Noland	44	Chevy		DAY; 29				RCH; 26																				43rd	63
2021	Conor Daly	44	Chevy			LVS; 40																							43rd	63
2021	Ross Chastain	44	Chevy				ATL; 7			KAN; 2																			43rd	63
2021	Kyle Larson	44	Chevy					BRD; 35																					43rd	63
2021	Bayley Currey	44	Chevy								DAR; 21																		43rd	63
2021	Logan Bearden	44	Chevy									COA; DNQ	CLT	TEX	NSH	POC													43rd	63
2021	Morgan Alexander	44	Chevy														KNX; 40	GLN	GTW	DAR	BRI	LVS	TAL	MAR					43rd	63
2021	Dean Thompson	44	Chevy																						PHO; 21				43rd	63
2022	Kris Wright	44	Chevy	DAY; 19	LVS; 17	ATL; 21	COA; 15	MAR; 30	BRD; 33	DAR; 33	KAN; 25	TEX; 35	CLT; 19	GTW; 33	SON; 26	KNX; 28	NSH; 17	MOH; 25	POC; 27	IRP; 31									28th	259
2022	Chad Chastain	44	Chevy																		RCH; 30				HOM; 30	PHO			28th	259
2022	Bayley Currey	44	Chevy																			KAN; 27	BRI; 15	TAL; 21					28th	259
2023	Kaden Honeycutt	44	Chevy	DAY	LVS	ATL	COA	TEX	BRD	MAR	KAN	DAR	NWS	CLT	GTW	NSH	MOH	POC; 20	RCH										44th	17
2023	Chad Chastain	44	Chevy																	IRP; DNQ	MLW	KAN							44th	17
2023	Danny Bohn	44	Chevy																				BRI; DNQ	TAL	HOM	PHO			44th	17
2024	Conor Daly	44	Chevy	DAY	ATL	LVS	BRI	COA	MAR	TEX	KAN	DAR	NWS	CLT	GTW	NSH	POC	IRP; 29	RCH			KAN; 17		HOM; 28					34th	107
2024	Matt Gould	44	Chevy																	MLW; 33					MAR; 26				34th	107
2024	Bayley Currey	44	Chevy																		BRI; 15								34th	107
2024	Danny Bohn	44	Chevy																				TAL; 17						34th	107
2024	Stefan Parsons	44	Chevy																							PHO; 23			34th	107
2025	Bayley Currey	44	Chevy	DAY; 21	ATL; 4	LVS; 18			BRI; 23	CAR; 20	TEX; 8	KAN; 26			NSH; 9														18th	543
2025	Ross Chastain	44	Chevy				HOM; 6							CLT; 2		MCH; 26			IRP; 9	GLN; 30									18th	543
2025	Matt Gould	44	Chevy					MAR; 23																					18th	543
2025	Conner Jones	44	Chevy										NWS; 27				POC; 31												18th	543
2025	Josh Bilicki	44	Chevy															LRP; 7											18th	543
2025	Andrés Pérez de Lara	44	Chevy																		RCH; 21	DAR; 16	BRI; 8	NHA; 15	ROV; 32	TAL; 17	MAR; 28	PHO; 30	18th	543
2026	Andrés Pérez de Lara	44	Chevy	DAY; 13	ATL; 15	STP; 7	DAR; 32	ROC; 32	BRI; 17	TEX; 30	GLN; 13	DOV; 28	CLT; 19	NSH; 14	MCH; 19	COR; 21	LRP; 7	NWS; 23	IRP; 11	RCH; 23	NHA; 27	BRI; 17	KAN; 24	CLT; 8	PHO; 12	TAL; 31	MAR; 6	HOM; 33	22nd	487

=== Truck No. 45 history ===
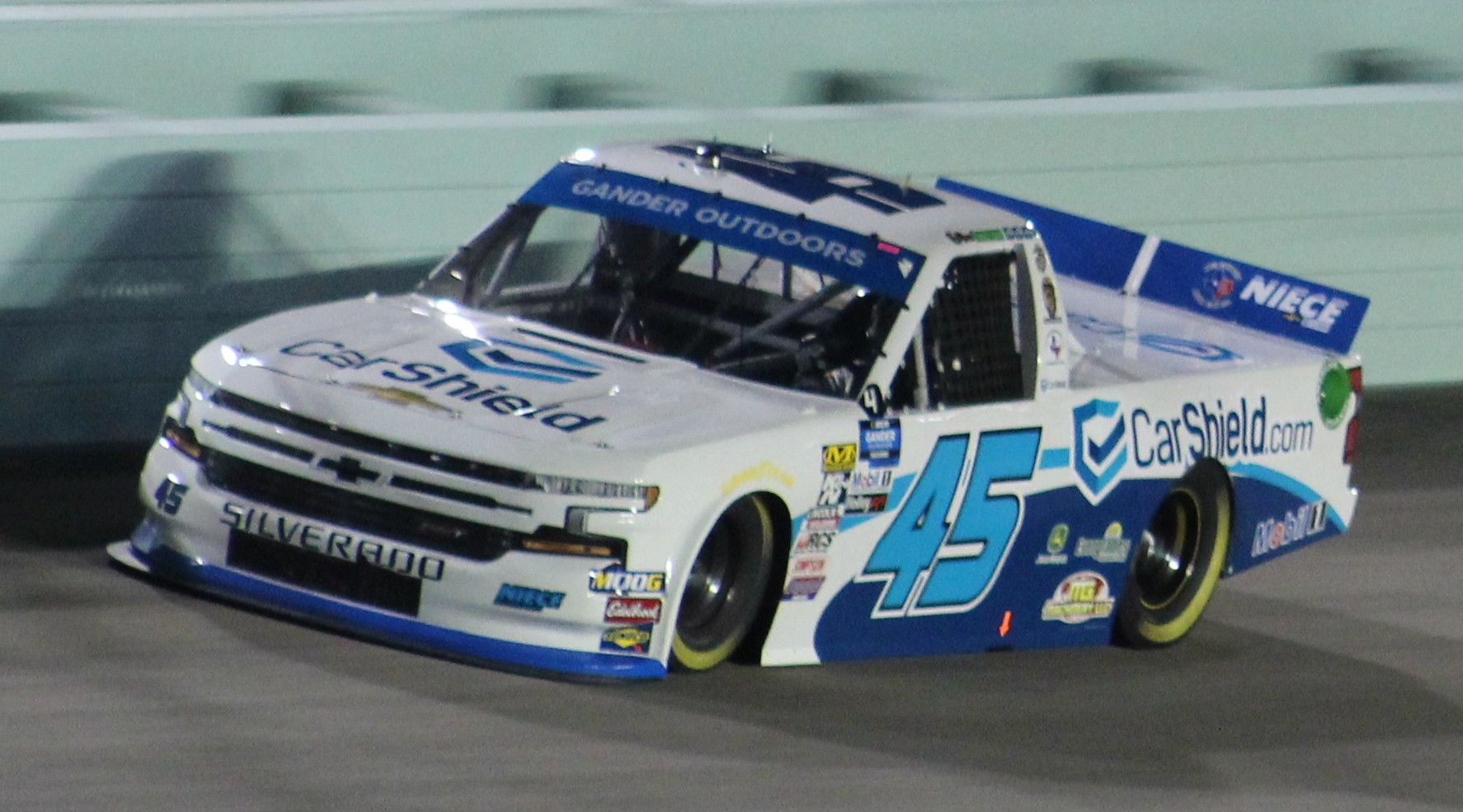
Ross Chastain in the No. 45 at Homestead in 2019

Niece Motorsports made their debut in 2016 with Casey Smith driving for two races.

The team returned in 2017, at first planning on running only part-time but were able to run the full schedule with various drivers, with T. J. Bell driving most of the races.

In 2018, it was announced that Justin Fontaine would drive the No. 45 truck full-time. Fontaine started the season with a top-ten finish at Daytona and Las Vegas.

On January 18, 2019, it was announced that Ross Chastain and Reid Wilson would split driving duties for the upcoming season. Chastain started off the year with two of the best results in team history, a third at Daytona and a sixth at Atlanta. In April, Kyle Benjamin joined the team for a seven-race schedule starting at Texas in June. On May 10, 2019, Chastain delivered his first truck win and the team's first win at Kansas after Stewart Friesen's underfueled truck ran out of gas with three laps remaining. In June, he announced his intention to switch to Truck Series points to compete for a championship in the series. Chastain finished the season with three wins, ten top-fives, nineteen top-tens, one pole and finishing second in the standings.

On December 10, 2019, it was announced that Ty Majeski would drive this truck full-time for the 2020 NASCAR Gander RV & Outdoors Truck Series season, replacing Chastain. After 15 races Majeski was replaced by Trevor Bayne for undisclosed reasons.

In 2021, it was announced that Brett Moffitt would drive the No. 45 truck full time. After six races, Moffitt switched to Xfinity points. Bayley Currey came in as replacement and Erik Darnell return to truck competition for one race at Darlington. Chastain drove at Texas.

In 2022, Lawless Alan drove the No. 45 truck full-time.

Prior to the 2024 season, Alan parted ways with Niece Motorsports. The No. 45 was shared between Johnny Sauter, Kaden Honeycutt, Connor Mosack, and Chastain. On May 11, Chastain won at Darlington.

On October 1, 2024, it was announced that Kaden Honeycutt would drive the No. 45 full-time in 2025. After sixteen races, he was released from the team due to signing with a different manufacturer for the 2026 season. Connor Zilisch and Bayley Currey filled out the remaining nine races.

On October 23, 2025, it was announced that Landen Lewis would drive the No. 45 part-time in 2026. On January 9, 2026, it was announced that Ross Chastain would drive the No. 45 for eight races in 2026. On January 14, 2026, it was announced that Ricky Stenhouse Jr. would make his NASCAR Craftsman Truck Series debut at Daytona in the No. 45 truck. He would also drive the No. 45 at Atlanta.

==== Truck No. 45 results ====
Year	Driver	No.	Make	1	2	3	4	5	6	7	8	9	10	11	12	13	14	15	16	17	18	19	20	21	22	23	24	25	NCWTC	Pts
2016	Casey Smith	45	Chevy	DAY	ATL	MAR	KAN	DOV	CLT	TEX	IOW	GTW	KEN	ELD	POC	BRI	MCH	MSP	CHI	NHA	LVS	TAL	MAR; DNQ	TEX; 23	PHO	HOM				
2017	T. J. Bell	45	Chevy	DAY; DNQ	ATL; 17	MAR; 24		CLT; 14	DOV; 23	TEX; 14	GTW; 15		KEN; 26		POC; 14	MCH; 16	BRI; 21			NHA; 16					PHO; 30	HOM; 16			17th	410
2017	Austin Wayne Self	45	Chevy				KAN; 15																	TEX; 15					17th	410
2017	Austin Wayne Self	45	Toyota									IOW; 23										TAL; 18							17th	410
2017	Jeffrey Abbey	45	Chevy											ELD; 14									MAR; 22						17th	410
2017	Victor Gonzalez Jr.	45	Chevy															MSP; 16											17th	410
2017	Justin Fontaine	45	Toyota																CHI; 17										17th	410
2017	Travis Pastrana	45	Chevy																		LVS; 22								17th	410
2018	Justin Fontaine	45	Chevy	DAY; 10	ATL; 19	LVS; 9	MAR; 28	DOV; 19	KAN; 17	CLT; 30	TEX; 30	IOW; 12	GTW; 26	CHI; 14	KEN; 17	ELD; 25	POC; 17	MCH; 25	BRI; 24	MSP; 18	LVS; 14	TAL; 21	MAR; 27	TEX; 19	PHO; 24	HOM; 22			21st	386
2019	Ross Chastain	45	Chevy	DAY; 3	ATL; 6	LVS; 10	MAR; 4	TEX; 7	DOV; 10	KAN; 1	CLT; 10			GTW; 1	CHI; 7	KEN; 4	POC; 1*	ELD; 12	MCH; 30	BRI; 3*	MSP; 8	LVS; 2*	TAL; 22	MAR; 2	PHO; 9	HOM; 4			2nd	4033
2019	Kyle Benjamin	45	Chevy									TEX; 31	IOW; 13																2nd	4033
2020	Ty Majeski	45	Chevy	DAY; 32	LVS; 13	CLT; 8	ATL; 19	HOM; 10	POC; 36	KEN; 19	TEX; 15	KAN; 11	KAN; 30	MCH; 15	DRC; 32	DOV; 14	GTW; 9	DAR; 13											18th	443
2020	Trevor Bayne	45	Chevy																RCH; 29	BRI; 36		TAL; 2	KAN; 10	TEX; 29	MAR; 11	PHO; 18			18th	443
2020	Travis Pastrana	45	Chevy																		LVS; 21								18th	443
2021	Brett Moffitt	45	Chevy	DAY; 25	DRC; 25	LVS; 11	ATL; 9	BRD; 24	RCH; 37																				28th	257
2021	Bayley Currey	45	Chevy							KAN; 12		COA; 26	CLT; 19			POC; 37													28th	257
2021	Erik Darnell	45	Chevy								DAR; 17																		28th	257
2021	Ross Chastain	45	Chevy											TEX; 36	NSH; 22														28th	257
2021	Jett Noland	45	Chevy														KNX; 37												28th	257
2021	Chad Chastain	45	Chevy															GLN; 34											28th	257
2021	Jake Griffin	45	Chevy																GTW; 34										28th	257
2021	Lawless Alan	45	Chevy																	DAR; 27	BRI; 18		TAL; 38		PHO; 36				28th	257
2021	Chris Hacker	45	Chevy																			LVS; 37		MAR; 16					28th	257
2022	Lawless Alan	45	Chevy	DAY; 25	LVS; 19	ATL; 33	COA; 11	MAR; 20	BRD; 30	DAR; 20	KAN; 19	TEX; 30	CLT; 22	GTW; 18	SON; 25	KNX; 18	NSH; 24	MOH; 24	POC; 22	IRP; 34	RCH; 24	KAN; 31	BRI; 23	TAL; 33	HOM; 34	PHO; 18			25th	294
2023	Lawless Alan	45	Chevy	DAY; DNQ	LVS; 20	ATL; 32	COA; 17	TEX; 18	BRD; DNQ	MAR; 32	KAN; 17	DAR; 30	NWS; 19	CLT; 17	GTW; 22	NSH; 36	MOH; 17	POC; 27	RCH; 28	IRP; 24	MLW; 21	KAN; 22	BRI; 28	TAL; 10	HOM; 19	PHO; 13			26th	317
2024	Johnny Sauter	45	Chevy	DAY; 29						TEX; 17																			10th	2172
2024	Kaden Honeycutt	45	Chevy		ATL; 6		BRI; 12		MAR; 9		KAN; 4			CLT; 7		NSH; 33			RCH; 14	MLW; 12	BRI; 35	KAN; 4	TAL; 19	HOM; 14	MAR; 33	PHO; 7			10th	2172
2024	Connor Mosack	45	Chevy			LVS; 19									GTW; 22														10th	2172
2024	Ross Chastain	45	Chevy					COA; 5				DAR; 1	NWS; 15				POC; 5	IRP; 11											10th	2172
2025	Kaden Honeycutt	45	Chevy	DAY; 35	ATL; 6	LVS; 16	HOM; 10	MAR; 26	BRI; 8	CAR; 6	TEX; 32	KAN; 8	NWS; 8	CLT; 3	NSH; 6	MCH; 21	POC; 3	LRP; 12	IRP; 14										13th	680
2025	Connor Zilisch	45	Chevy																	GLN; 8									13th	680
2025	Bayley Currey	45	Chevy																		RCH; 20	DAR; 25	BRI; 19	NHA; 18	ROV; 12	TAL; 31	MAR; 21	PHO; 30	13th	680
2026	Ricky Stenhouse Jr.	45	Chevy	DAY; 6	ATL; 9																								10th	2199
2026	Landen Lewis	45	Chevy			STP; 6		ROC; 14								COR; 4	LRP; 2	NWS; 5	IRP; 35	RCH; 14	NHA; 32	BRI; 14	KAN; 34	CLT; 7	PHO; 16	TAL; 6	MAR; 19	HOM; 14	10th	2199
2026	Ross Chastain	45	Chevy				DAR; 2		BRI; 4	TEX; 12	GLN; 28	DOV; 18	CLT; 29	NSH; 4	MCH; 17														10th	2199

== ARCA Menards Series ==
=== Car No. 40 history ===
In 2021, the team fielded the No. 40 Chevrolet SS for Dean Thompson at Kansas.

In 2022, the team fielded the No. 40 Chevrolet SS for Matt Gould, son of crew chief Phil Gould, at Milwaukee Mile.

==== Car No. 40 results ====
Year	Driver	No.	Make	1	2	3	4	5	6	7	8	9	10	11	12	13	14	15	16	17	18	19	20	AMSC	Pts
2021	Dean Thompson	40	Chevy	DAY	PHO	TAL	KAN	TOL	CLT	MOH	POC	ELK	BLN	IOW	WIN	GLN	MCH	ISF	MLW	DSF	BRI	SLM	KAN; 8		
2022	Matt Gould	40	Chevy	DAY	PHO	TAL	KAN	CLT	IOW	BLN	ELK	MOH	POC	IRP	MCH	GLN	ISF	MLW; 10	DSF	KAN	BRI	SLM	TOL; 8		

=== Car No. 50 history ===
In 2021, the team attempted to make their ARCA Menards Series debut with Jett Noland at Pocono. The team would later make starts with Morgan Alexander and Carson Hocevar.

==== Car No. 50 results ====
Year	Driver	No.	Make	1	2	3	4	5	6	7	8	9	10	11	12	13	14	15	16	17	18	19	20	AMSC	Pts
2021	Jett Noland	50	Chevy	DAY	PHO	TAL	KAN	TOL	CLT	MOH	POC; 11	ELK													
2021	Morgan Alexander	50	Chevy										BLN; 10	IOW; 15	WIN										
2021	Carson Hocevar	50	Chevy													GLN; 4	MCH	ISF	MLW	DSF	BRI	SLM	KAN		

=== Car No. 40 history ===
In 2022, the team would field the No. 40 Chevrolet SS for Matt Gould, son of crew chief Phil Gould, at Milwaukee Mile.

==== Car No. 40 history ====
Year	Driver	No.	Make	1	2	3	4	5	6	7	AMSEC	Pts
2022	Matt Gould	40	Chevy	NSM	FIF	DOV	NSV	IOW	MLW; 10	BRI		

=== Car No. 50 history ===
In 2021, the team would field the No. 50 Chevrolet SS for Morgan Alexander at Iowa.

==== Car No. 50 history ====
Year	Driver	No.	Make	1	2	3	4	5	6	7	8	AMSEC	Pts
2021	Morgan Alexander	50	Chevy	NSM	FIF	NSV	DOV	SNM	IOW; 15	MLW	BRI		

=== Car No. 40 history ===
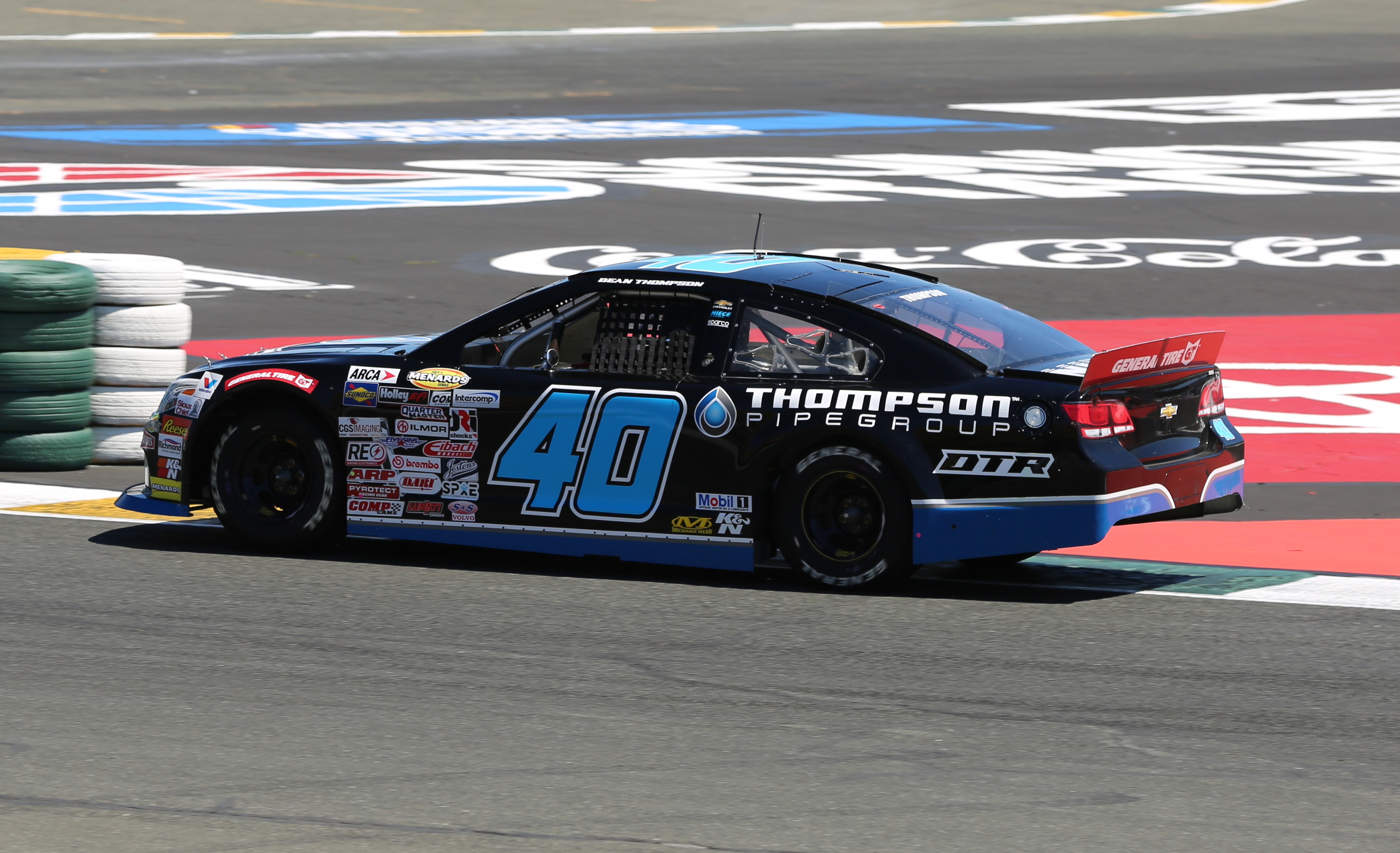
Dean Thompson At Sonoma in 2022.

In 2022, the team would field the No. 40 Chevrolet SS for Dean Thompson at Sonoma and for Carson Hocevar at Phoenix.

==== Car No. 40 results ====
Year	Driver	No.	Make	1	2	3	4	5	6	7	8	9	10	11	AMSWC	Pts
2022	Dean Thompson	40	Chevy	PHO	IRW	KCR	PIR	SON; 15	IRW	EVG	PIR	AAS	LVS			
2022	Carson Hocevar	40	Chevy											PHO; 29		
