= 2024 LiUNA! 175 =

Race details
- Race 17 of 23 in the 2024 NASCAR Craftsman Truck Series
- Date: August 25, 2024
- Location: Milwaukee Mile in West Allis, Wisconsin
- Course: Permanent racing facility
- Course length: 1 miles (1.6 km)
- Distance: 175 laps, 175 mi (281 km)
- Average speed: 97.537 miles per hour (156.971 km/h)

Pole position
Driver	Ty Majeski	ThorSport Racing
- Time: 29.815

Most laps led
Driver	Ty Majeski	ThorSport Racing
- Laps: 71

Winner
No. 38	Layne Riggs	Front Row Motorsports

Television in the United States
- Network: FS1
- Announcers: Adam Alexander, Phil Parsons, and Michael Waltrip

The 2024 LiUNA! 175 was a NASCAR Craftsman Truck Series race that held on August 25, 2024, at the Milwaukee Mile in West Allis, Wisconsin. Contested over 175 laps on the 1 mile (1.6 km) permanent oval shaped racetrack, it was the 17th race of the 2024 NASCAR Craftsman Truck Series. Layne Riggs, driving for Front Row Motorsports, would take the lead from Ty Majeski late in the race to earn his first career NASCAR Craftsman Truck Series win, being the first father and son duo to win in the series since Bob and Brad Keselowski with his dad Scott Riggs. Majeski led a race-high 71 laps. To fill out the podium, Majeski, driving for ThorSport Racing and Christian Eckes, driving for McAnally-Hilgemann Racing, would finish 2nd and 3rd, respectively.

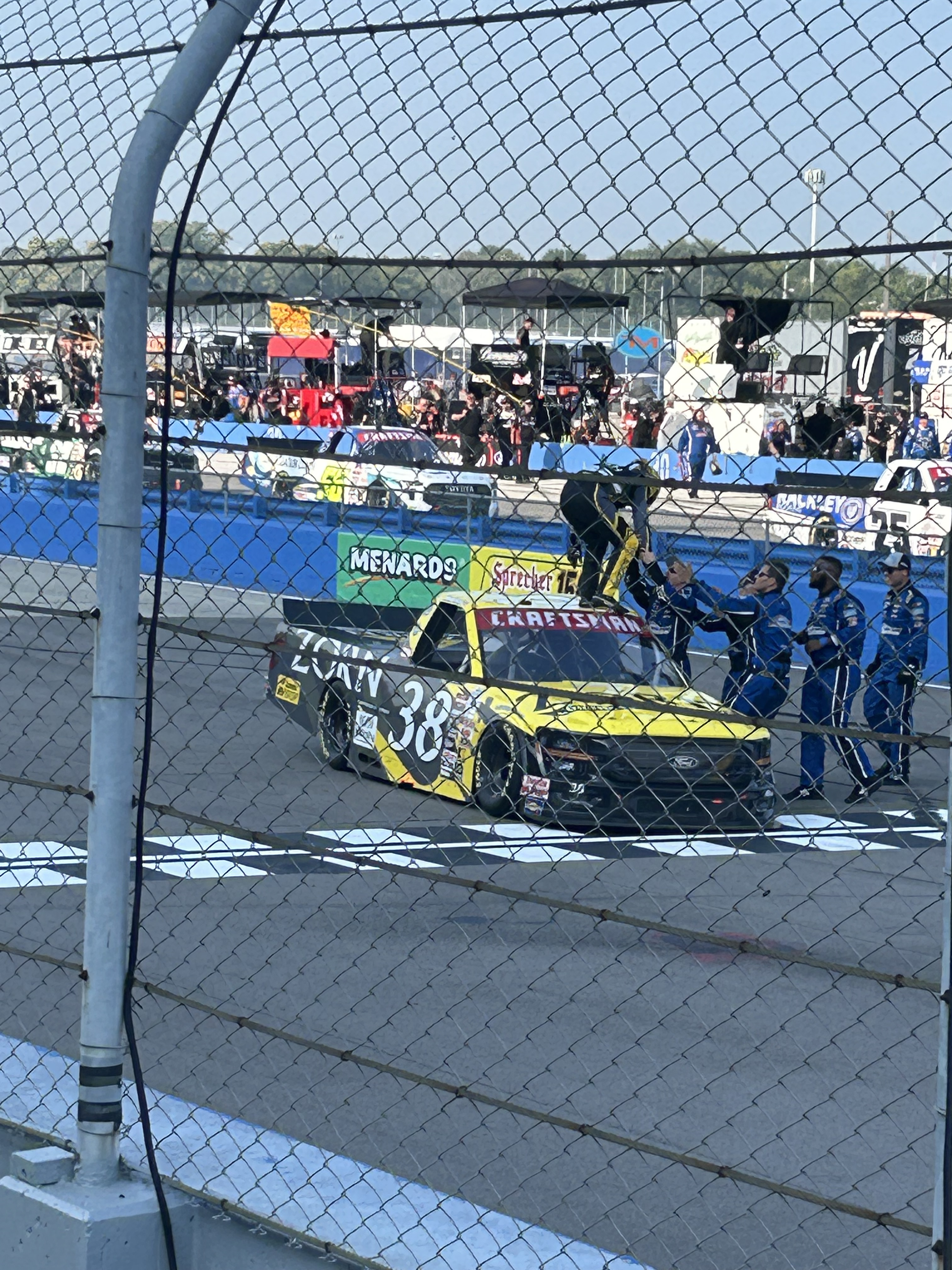
Layne Riggs with his crew after winning.

== Report ==
=== Background ===
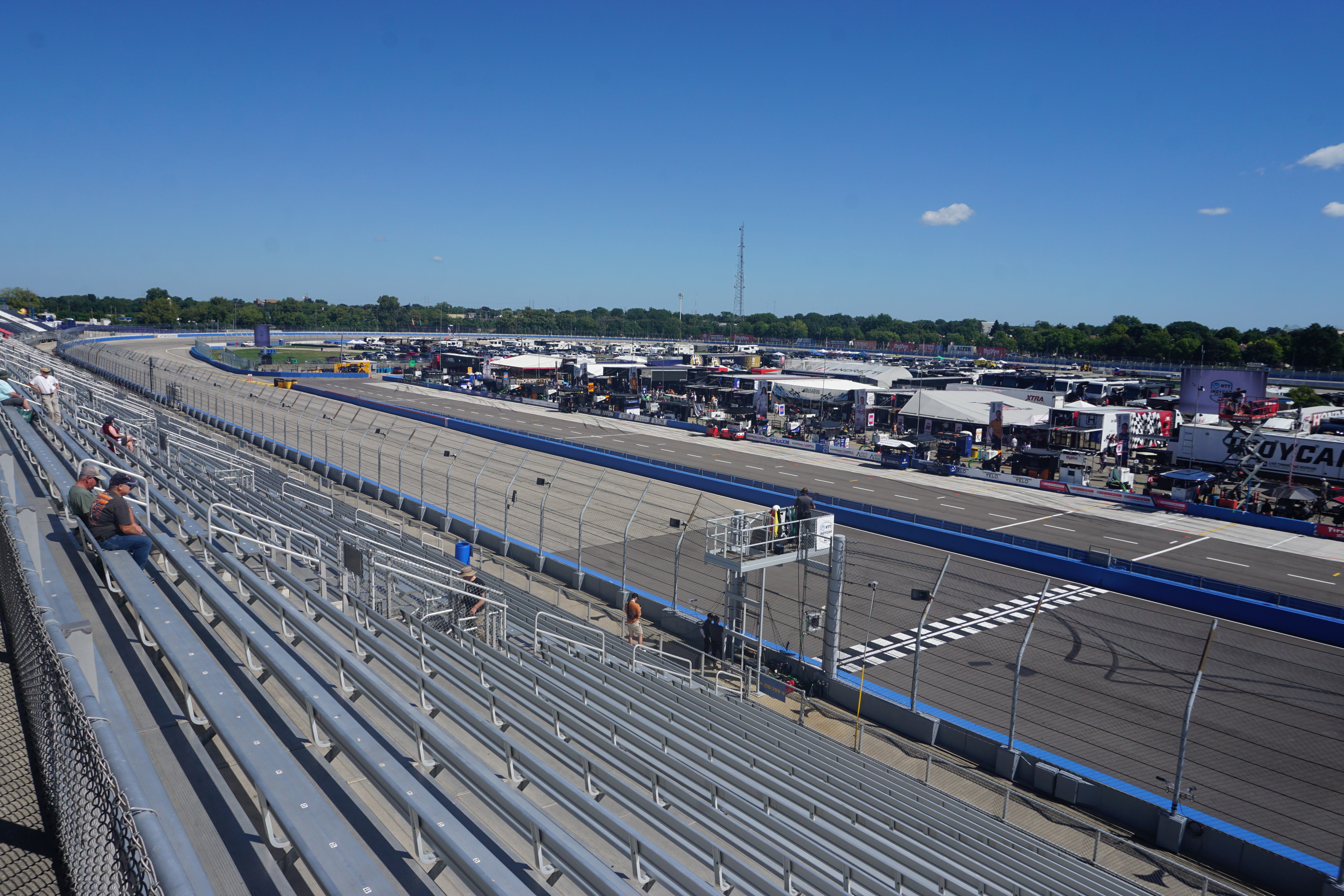
The Milwaukee Mile, the track where the race was held.

The Milwaukee Mile is a 1.015 mi (1.633 km) oval race track in the central United States, located on the grounds of the Wisconsin State Fair Park in West Allis, Wisconsin, a suburb west of Milwaukee. Its grandstand and bleachers seats approximately 37,000 spectators. Paved 72 years ago in 1954, it was originally a dirt track. In addition to the oval, there is a 1.800 mi (2.897 km) road circuit located on the infield.

As the oldest operating motor speedway in the world, the Milwaukee Mile has hosted at least one auto race every year from 1903 to 2015 (except during U.S. involvement in World War II). The track has held events sanctioned by major bodies, such as the AAA, USAC, NASCAR, CART/Champ Car World Series, and the IndyCar Series. There have also been many races in regional series such as ARTGO.

=== Entry list ===
- (R) denotes rookie driver.
- (i) denotes driver who is ineligible for series driver points.
- (P) denotes playoff driver.
- (OP) denotes owner's playoff truck.

#	Driver	Team	Make
1	William Sawalich	Tricon Garage	Toyota
02	Dexter Bean (i)	Young's Motorsports	Chevrolet
2	Nick Sanchez (P)	Rev Racing	Chevrolet
04	Marco Andretti	Roper Racing	Chevrolet
5	Dean Thompson	Tricon Garage	Toyota
6	Norm Benning	Norm Benning Racing	Chevrolet
7	Sammy Smith (i) (OP)	Spire Motorsports	Chevrolet
9	Grant Enfinger (P)	CR7 Motorsports	Chevrolet
11	Corey Heim (P)	Tricon Garage	Toyota
13	Jake Garcia	ThorSport Racing	Ford
15	Tanner Gray	Tricon Garage	Toyota
17	Taylor Gray (P)	Tricon Garage	Toyota
18	Tyler Ankrum (P)	McAnally-Hilgemann Racing	Chevrolet
19	Christian Eckes (P)	McAnally-Hilgemann Racing	Chevrolet
21	Jayson Alexander	Floridian Motorsports	Ford
22	Mason Maggio	Reaume Brothers Racing	Ford
25	Ty Dillon	Rackley WAR	Chevrolet
32	Bret Holmes	Bret Holmes Racing	Chevrolet
33	Lawless Alan	Reaume Brothers Racing	Ford
38	Layne Riggs (R)	Front Row Motorsports	Ford
41	Bayley Currey	Niece Motorsports	Chevrolet
42	Matt Mills	Niece Motorsports	Chevrolet
43	Daniel Dye (P)	McAnally-Hilgemann Racing	Chevrolet
44	Matt Gould	Niece Motorsports	Chevrolet
45	Kaden Honeycutt (OP)	Niece Motorsports	Chevrolet
46	Thad Moffitt (R)	Young's Motorsports	Chevrolet
52	Stewart Friesen	Halmar Friesen Racing	Toyota
56	Timmy Hill	Hill Motorsports	Toyota
66	Conner Jones (R)	ThorSport Racing	Ford
71	Rajah Caruth (P)	Spire Motorsports	Chevrolet
76	Spencer Boyd	Freedom Racing Enterprises	Chevrolet
77	Chase Purdy	Spire Motorsports	Chevrolet
88	Matt Crafton	ThorSport Racing	Ford
90	Justin Carroll	TC Motorsports	Toyota
91	Jack Wood	McAnally-Hilgemann Racing	Chevrolet
98	Ty Majeski (P)	ThorSport Racing	Ford
99	Ben Rhodes (P)	ThorSport Racing	Ford
Official entry list

== Practice ==
The first and only practice session was held on Saturday, August 24, at 3:00 PM CT and would last for 20 minutes. Ty Majeski, driving for ThorSport Racing, would set the fastest time in the session, with a lap of 30.585, and a speed of 119.470 mph (192.268 km/h).

Pos.	#	Driver	Team	Make	Time	Speed
1	98	Ty Majeski (P)	ThorSport Racing	Ford	30.585	119.470
2	17	Taylor Gray (P)	Tricon Garage	Toyota	30.608	119.381
3	19	Christian Eckes (P)	McAnally-Hilgemann Racing	Chevrolet	30.624	119.318
Full practice results

== Qualifying ==
Qualifying was held on Saturday, August 24, at 3:00 PM CT. Since Milwaukee Mile is a mile oval, the qualifying system used is a single-car, one-lap system with only one round. In that round, whoever sets the fastest time will win the pole.

Ty Majeski, driving for ThorSport Racing, would score the pole for the race, with a lap of 29.816, and a speed of 122.552 mph (197.228 km/h).

Norm Benning would fail to qualify.

Pos.	#	Driver	Team	Make	Time	Speed
1	98	Ty Majeski (P)	ThorSport Racing	Ford	29.815	122.552
2	15	Tanner Gray	Tricon Garage	Toyota	29.836	122.469
3	19	Christian Eckes (P)	McAnally-Hilgemann Racing	Chevrolet	29.997	121.812
4	11	Corey Heim	TRICON Garage	Toyota	30.007	121.772
5	2	Nick Sanchez	Rev Racing	Chevrolet	30.098	121.403
6	1	William Sawalich	TRICON Garage	Toyota	30.136	121.250
7	45	Kaden Honeycutt	Niece Motorsports	Chevrolet	30.143	121.222
8	71	Rajah Caruth	Spire Motorsports	Chevrolet	30.165	121.134
9	18	Tyler Ankrum	McAnally-Hilgemann Racing	Chevrolet	30.181	121.070
10	43	Daniel Dye	McAnally-Hilgemann Racing	Chevrolet	30.205	120.973
11	17	Taylor Gray	TRICON Garage	Toyota	30.235	120.853
12	9	Grant Enfinger	CR7 Motorsports	Chevrolet	30.236	120.849
13	41	Bayley Currey	Niece Motorsports	Chevrolet	30.271	120.710
14	88	Matt Crafton	Thorsport Racing	Ford	30.292	120.626
15	25	Ty Dillon	Rackley W.A.R.	Chevrolet	30.307	120.566
16	38	Layne Riggs	Front Row Motorsports	Ford	30.338	120.443
17	42	Matt Mills	Niece Motorsports	Chevrolet	30.430	120.079
18	99	Ben Rhodes	Thorsport Racing	Ford	30.446	120.016
19	7	Sammy Smith	Spire Motorsports	Chevrolet	30.466	119.937
20	13	Jake Garcia	Thorsport Racing	Ford	30.490	119.843
21	77	Chase Purdy	Spire Motorsports	Chevrolet	30.492	119.835
22	5	Dean Thompson	TRICON Garage	Toyota	30.526	119.701
23	52	Stewart Friesen	Halmar Friesen Racing	Toyota	30.636	119.271
24	04	Marco Andretti	Roper Racing	Ford	30.670	119.139
25	91	Jack Wood	McAnally-Hilgemann Racing	Chevrolet	30.743	118.856
26	66	Conner Jones	Thorsport Racing	Ford	30.744	118.852
27	56	Timmy Hill	Hill Motorsports	Toyota	30.813	118.586
28	32	Bret Holmes	Bret Holmes Racing	Chevrolet	30.880	118.329
29	22	Mason Maggio	Reaume Brothers Racing	Ford	30.887	118.302
30	33	Lawless Alan	Reaume Brothers Racing	Ford	30.888	118.298
31	44	Matthew Gould	Niece Motorsports	Chevrolet	31.047	117.693
Qualified by owner's points
32	02	Dexter Bean	Young's Motorsports	Chevrolet	31.144	117.326
33	46	Thad Moffitt	Young's Motorsports	Chevrolet	31.276	116.831
34	76	Spencer Boyd	Freedom Racing Enterprises	Chevrolet	31.361	116.514
35	90	Justin Carroll	TC Motorsports	Toyota	31.998	114.195
36	21	Jayson Alexander	Floridian Motorsports	Ford	32.345	112.970
Failed to qualify
37	6	Norm Benning	Norm Benning Racing	Chevrolet	34.037	107.354
Official qualifying results

== Race results ==
Stage 1 Laps: 55

Pos.	#	Driver	Team	Make	Pts
1	25	Ty Dillon	Rackley WAR	Chevrolet	10
2	13	Jake Garcia	ThorSport Racing	Ford	9
3	19	Christian Eckes (P)	McAnally-Hilgemann Racing	Chevrolet	8
4	98	Ty Majeski (P)	ThorSport Racing	Ford	7
5	2	Nick Sanchez (P)	Rev Racing	Chevrolet	6
6	38	Layne Riggs (R)	Front Row Motorsports	Ford	5
7	43	Daniel Dye (P)	McAnally-Hilgemann Racing	Chevrolet	4
8	15	Tanner Gray	Tricon Garage	Toyota	3
9	17	Taylor Gray (P)	Tricon Garage	Toyota	2
10	18	Tyler Ankrum (P)	McAnally-Hilgemann Racing	Chevrolet	1

Stage 2 Laps: 55

Pos.	#	Driver	Team	Make	Pts
1	19	Christian Eckes (P)	McAnally-Hilgemann Racing	Chevrolet	10
2	98	Ty Majeski (P)	ThorSport Racing	Ford	9
3	38	Layne Riggs (R)	Front Row Motorsports	Ford	8
4	2	Nick Sanchez (P)	Rev Racing	Chevrolet	7
5	17	Taylor Gray (P)	Tricon Garage	Toyota	6
6	43	Daniel Dye (P)	McAnally-Hilgemann Racing	Chevrolet	5
7	18	Tyler Ankrum (P)	McAnally-Hilgemann Racing	Chevrolet	4
8	88	Matt Crafton	ThorSport Racing	Ford	3
9	45	Kaden Honeycutt (OP)	Niece Motorsports	Chevrolet	2
10	9	Grant Enfinger (P)	CR7 Motorsports	Chevrolet	1

Stage 3 Laps: 65

Fin	St	#	Driver	Team	Make	Laps	Led	Status	Pts
1	16	38	Layne Riggs (R)	Front Row Motorsports	Ford	175	53	Running	53
2	1	98	Ty Majeski (P)	ThorSport Racing	Ford	175	71	Running	51
3	3	19	Christian Eckes (P)	McAnally-Hilgemann Racing	Chevrolet	175	45	Running	52
4	5	2	Nick Sanchez (P)	Rev Racing	Chevrolet	175	0	Running	46
5	5	17	Taylor Gray (P)	Tricon Garage	Toyota	175	0	Running	40
6	9	18	Tyler Ankrum (P)	McAnally-Hilgemann Racing	Chevrolet	175	0	Running	36
7	4	11	Corey Heim (P)	Tricon Garage	Toyota	175	0	Running	30
8	10	43	Daniel Dye (P)	McAnally-Hilgemann Racing	Chevrolet	175	0	Running	38
9	10	99	Ben Rhodes (P)	ThorSport Racing	Ford	175	0	Running	28
10	14	88	Matt Crafton	ThorSport Racing	Ford	175	0	Running	30
Official race results

== Standings after the race ==
Drivers' Championship standings

	Pos	Driver	Points
2	1	Christian Eckes	2090
1	2	Ty Majeski	2074 (-16)
2	3	Corey Heim	2071 (–19)
	4	Nick Sanchez	2064 (–26)
5	5	Taylor Gray	2043 (–47)
1	6	Tyler Ankrum	2043 (–47)
1	7	Daniel Dye	2039 (–51)
2	8	Grant Enfinger	2032 (–58)
	9	Ben Rhodes	2030 (–60)
5	10	Rajah Caruth	2028 (–62)
Official driver's standings

Manufacturers' Championship standings

Pos	Manufacturer	Points
1	Chevrolet	637
2	Toyota	593 (-44)
3	Ford	563 (–74)

- Note: Only the first 10 positions are included for the driver standings.

Previous race: 2024 Clean Harbors 250	NASCAR Craftsman Truck Series; 2024 season	Next race: 2024 UNOH 200
