= 2024 Kubota Tractor 200 =

19th race of the 2024 NASCAR Craftsman Truck Series

Race details
- Race 19 of 23 of the 2024 NASCAR Craftsman Truck Series
- Date: September 27, 2024
- Location: Kansas Speedway in Kansas City, Kansas
- Course: Permanent racing facility
- Course length: 1.5 miles (2.4 km)
- Distance: 134 laps, 201 mi (323 km)
- Scheduled distance: 134 laps, 201 mi (323 km)
- Average speed: 125.843 mph (202.525 km/h)

Pole position
Driver	Ty Majeski	ThorSport Racing
- Time: 30.853

Most laps led
Driver	Corey Heim	Tricon Garage
- Laps: 64

Winner
No. 11	Corey Heim	Tricon Garage

Television in the United States
- Network: FS1
- Announcers: Jamie Little, Phil Parsons, and Michael Waltrip

Radio in the United States
- Radio: MRN

The 2024 Kubota Tractor 200 was the 19th stock car race of the 2024 NASCAR Craftsman Truck Series, the final race of the Round of 12, and the third iteration of the event. The race was held on Friday, September 27, 2024, at Kansas Speedway in Kansas City, Kansas, a 1.5 miles (2.4 km) permanent quad-oval shaped racetrack. The race took the scheduled 134 laps to complete. In a close race with a wild finish, Corey Heim, driving for Tricon Garage, would steal the win on the final lap after Ty Majeski ran out of fuel while leading. Heim dominated the race in general, starting from the rear, winning the second stage, and leading a race-high 64 laps to earn his 11th career NASCAR Craftsman Truck Series win, and his sixth of the season. To fill out the podium, Layne Riggs, driving for Front Row Motorsports, and Christian Eckes, driving for McAnally-Hilgemann Racing, would finish 2nd and 3rd, respectively.

Following the race, Ben Rhodes and Daniel Dye were eliminated from playoff contention. Heim, Eckes, Majeski, Nick Sanchez, Rajah Caruth, Grant Enfinger, Tyler Ankrum, and Taylor Gray would advance into the Round of 8.

== Report ==
=== Background ===
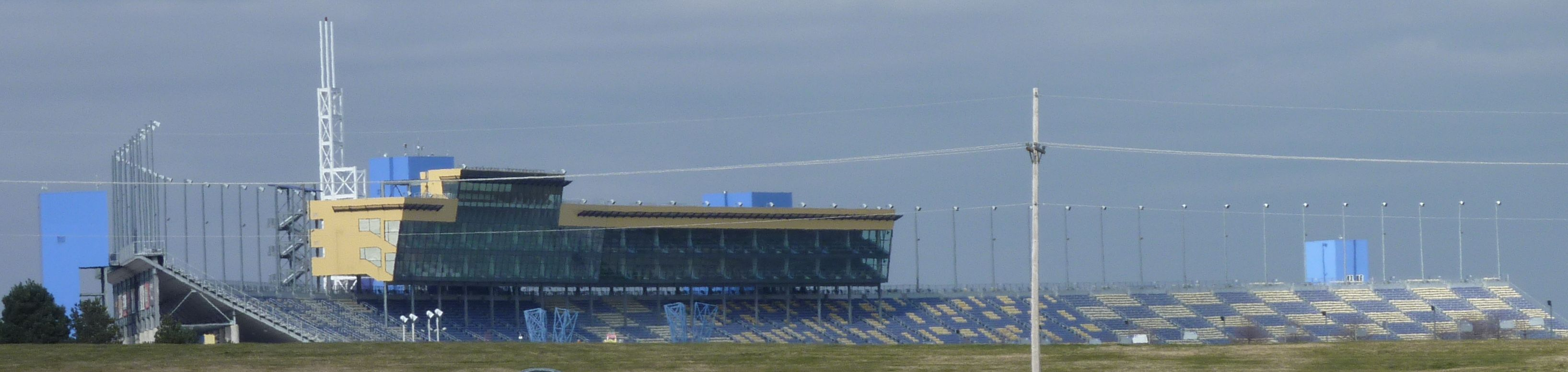
Kansas Speedway, the circuit where the race was held.

Kansas Speedway is a 1.5-mile (2.4 km) tri-oval race track in Kansas City, Kansas. It was built in 2001 and it currently hosts two annual NASCAR race weekends. The IndyCar Series also raced at here until 2011. The speedway is owned and operated by the International Speedway Corporation.

==== Entry list ====
- (R) denotes rookie driver.
- (i) denotes driver who is ineligible for series driver points.
- (P) denotes playoff driver.
- (OP) denotes owner's playoff truck.

#	Driver	Team	Make
1	Brenden Queen	Tricon Garage	Toyota
02	Nathan Byrd (i)	Young's Motorsports	Chevrolet
2	Nick Sanchez (R)	Rev Racing	Chevrolet
04	Marco Andretti	Roper Racing	Chevrolet
5	Dean Thompson	Tricon Garage	Toyota
7	Connor Mosack (OP)	Spire Motorsports	Chevrolet
9	Grant Enfinger (P)	CR7 Motorsports	Chevrolet
10	Jennifer Jo Cobb	Jennifer Jo Cobb Racing	Chevrolet
11	Corey Heim (P)	Tricon Garage	Toyota
13	Jake Garcia	ThorSport Racing	Ford
15	Tanner Gray	Tricon Garage	Toyota
17	Taylor Gray (P)	Tricon Garage	Toyota
18	Tyler Ankrum (P)	McAnally-Hilgemann Racing	Chevrolet
19	Christian Eckes (P)	McAnally-Hilgemann Racing	Chevrolet
22	Frankie Muniz	Reaume Brothers Racing	Ford
25	Dawson Sutton	Rackley WAR	Chevrolet
32	Bret Holmes	Bret Holmes Racing	Chevrolet
33	Lawless Alan	Reaume Brothers Racing	Ford
38	Layne Riggs (R)	Front Row Motorsports	Ford
41	Bayley Currey	Niece Motorsports	Chevrolet
42	Matt Mills	Niece Motorsports	Chevrolet
43	Daniel Dye (P)	McAnally-Hilgemann Racing	Chevrolet
44	Conor Daly (i)	Niece Motorsports	Chevrolet
45	Kaden Honeycutt (OP)	Niece Motorsports	Chevrolet
46	Justin Mondeik	Young’s Motorsports	Chevrolet
52	Stewart Friesen	Halmar Friesen Racing	Toyota
56	Timmy Hill	Hill Motorsports	Toyota
71	Rajah Caruth (P)	Spire Motorsports	Chevrolet
76	Spencer Boyd	Freedom Racing Enterprises	Chevrolet
77	Chase Purdy	Spire Motorsports	Chevrolet
88	Matt Crafton	ThorSport Racing	Ford
91	Corey Day	McAnally-Hilgemann Racing	Chevrolet
98	Ty Majeski (P)	ThorSport Racing	Ford
99	Ben Rhodes (P)	ThorSport Racing	Ford
Official entry list

== Practice ==
The first and only practice session was held on Friday, September 27, at 2:00 PM EST, and would last for 20 minutes. Nick Sanchez, driving for Rev Racing, would set the fastest time in the session, with a lap of 31.133, and a speed of 173.449 mph (279.139 km/h).

Pos.	#	Driver	Team	Make	Time	Speed
1	2	Nick Sanchez (P)	Rev Racing	Chevrolet	31.133	173.449
2	98	Ty Majeski (P)	ThorSport Racing	Ford	31.171	173.238
3	38	Layne Riggs (R)	Front Row Motorsports	Ford	31.237	172.872
Full practice results

== Qualifying ==
Qualifying was held on Friday, September 27, at 2:30 PM EST. Since Kansas Speedway is an intermediate racetrack, the qualifying system used is a single-car, one-lap system with only one round. Drivers will be on track by themselves and will have one lap to post a qualifying time, and whoever sets the fastest time will win the pole.

Ty Majeski, driving for ThorSport Racing, would score the pole for the race, with a lap of 30.853, and a speed of 175.023 mph (281.672 km/h).

No drivers would fail to qualify.

=== Qualifying results ===
Pos.	#	Driver	Team	Make	Time	Speed
1	98	Ty Majeski (P)	ThorSport Racing	Ford	30.853	175.023
2	7	Connor Mosack (OP)	Spire Motorsports	Chevrolet	30.934	174.565
3	19	Christian Eckes (P)	McAnally-Hilgemann Racing	Chevrolet	30.949	174.481
4	99	Ben Rhodes (P)	ThorSport Racing	Ford	30.963	174.402
5	25	Dawson Sutton	Rackley WAR	Chevrolet	30.970	174.362
6	45	Kaden Honeycutt (OP)	Niece Motorsports	Chevrolet	31.013	174.121
7	2	Nick Sanchez (P)	Rev Racing	Chevrolet	31.026	174.048
8	52	Stewart Friesen	Halmar Friesen Racing	Toyota	31.085	173.717
9	13	Jake Garcia	ThorSport Racing	Ford	31.123	173.505
10	43	Daniel Dye (P)	McAnally-Hilgemann Racing	Chevrolet	31.125	173.494
11	5	Dean Thompson	Tricon Garage	Toyota	31.125	173.494
12	42	Matt Mills	Niece Motorsports	Chevrolet	31.125	173.494
13	38	Layne Riggs (R)	Front Row Motorsports	Ford	31.127	173.483
14	18	Tyler Ankrum (P)	McAnally-Hilgemann Racing	Chevrolet	31.136	173.433
15	77	Chase Purdy	Spire Motorsports	Chevrolet	31.156	173.321
16	71	Rajah Caruth (P)	Spire Motorsports	Chevrolet	31.170	173.244
17	17	Taylor Gray (P)	Tricon Garage	Toyota	31.187	173.149
18	91	Corey Day	McAnally-Hilgemann Racing	Chevrolet	31.189	173.138
19	9	Grant Enfinger (P)	CR7 Motorsports	Chevrolet	31.243	172.839
20	32	Bret Holmes	Bret Holmes Racing	Chevrolet	31.295	172.552
21	15	Tanner Gray	Tricon Garage	Toyota	31.306	172.491
22	41	Bayley Currey	Niece Motorsports	Chevrolet	31.309	172.474
23	1	Brenden Queen	Tricon Garage	Toyota	31.347	172.265
24	33	Lawless Alan	Reaume Brothers Racing	Ford	31.365	172.166
25	04	Marco Andretti	Cook Racing Technologies	Chevrolet	31.440	171.756
26	88	Matt Crafton	ThorSport Racing	Ford	31.797	169.827
27	46	Justin Mondeik	Young's Motorsports	Chevrolet	31.923	169.157
28	76	Spencer Boyd	Freedom Racing Enterprises	Chevrolet	31.969	168.914
29	44	Conor Daly (i)	Niece Motorsports	Chevrolet	32.063	168.418
30	56	Timmy Hill	Hill Motorsports	Toyota	32.180	167.806
31	22	Frankie Muniz	Reaume Brothers Racing	Ford	32.209	167.655
Qualified by owner's points
32	02	Nathan Byrd (i)	Young's Motorsports	Chevrolet	32.348	166.935
33	11	Corey Heim (P)	Tricon Garage	Toyota	–	–
34	10	Jennifer Jo Cobb	Jennifer Jo Cobb Racing	Chevrolet	–	–
Official qualifying results
Official starting lineup

== Race results ==
Stage 1 Laps: 30

Pos.	#	Driver	Team	Make	Pts
1	98	Ty Majeski (P)	ThorSport Racing	Ford	10
2	19	Christian Eckes (P)	McAnally-Hilgemann Racing	Chevrolet	9
3	11	Corey Heim (P)	Tricon Garage	Toyota	8
4	45	Kaden Honeycutt (OP)	Niece Motorsports	Chevrolet	7
5	38	Layne Riggs (R)	Front Row Motorsports	Ford	6
6	2	Nick Sanchez (P)	Rev Racing	Chevrolet	5
7	17	Taylor Gray (P)	Tricon Garage	Toyota	4
8	15	Tanner Gray	Tricon Garage	Toyota	3
9	52	Stewart Friesen	Halmar Friesen Racing	Toyota	2
10	7	Connor Mosack (OP)	Spire Motorsports	Chevrolet	1

Stage 2 Laps: 30

Pos.	#	Driver	Team	Make	Pts
1	11	Corey Heim (P)	Tricon Garage	Toyota	10
2	38	Layne Riggs (R)	Front Row Motorsports	Ford	9
3	19	Christian Eckes (P)	McAnally-Hilgemann Racing	Chevrolet	8
4	98	Ty Majeski (P)	ThorSport Racing	Ford	7
5	17	Taylor Gray (P)	Tricon Garage	Toyota	6
6	2	Nick Sanchez (P)	Rev Racing	Chevrolet	5
7	15	Tanner Gray	Tricon Garage	Toyota	4
8	45	Kaden Honeycutt (OP)	Niece Motorsports	Chevrolet	3
9	41	Bayley Currey	Niece Motorsports	Chevrolet	2
10	71	Rajah Caruth (P)	Spire Motorsports	Chevrolet	1

Stage 3 Laps: 74

Fin	St	#	Driver	Team	Make	Laps	Led	Status	Pts
1	33	11	Corey Heim (P)	Tricon Garage	Toyota	134	64	Running	58
2	13	38	Layne Riggs (R)	Front Row Motorsports	Ford	134	0	Running	50
3	3	19	Christian Eckes (P)	McAnally-Hilgemann Racing	Chevrolet	134	19	Running	51
4	6	45	Kaden Honeycutt (OP)	Niece Motorsports	Chevrolet	134	0	Running	43
5	5	25	Dawson Sutton	Rackley WAR	Chevrolet	134	0	Running	32
6	21	15	Tanner Gray	Tricon Garage	Toyota	134	0	Running	38
7	16	71	Rajah Caruth (P)	Spire Motorsports	Chevrolet	134	0	Running	31
8	22	41	Bayley Currey	Niece Motorsports	Chevrolet	134	0	Running	31
9	19	9	Grant Enfinger	CR7 Motorsports	Chevrolet	134	0	Running	28
10	2	7	Connor Mosack (OP)	Spire Motorsports	Chevrolet	134	0	Running	28
11	15	77	Chase Purdy	Spire Motorsports	Chevrolet	134	0	Running	26
12	7	2	Nick Sanchez (P)	Rev Racing	Chevrolet	134	0	Running	35
13	11	5	Dean Thompson	Tricon Garage	Toyota	134	0	Running	24
14	14	18	Tyler Ankrum (P)	McAnally-Hilgemann Racing	Chevrolet	134	0	Running	23
15	1	98	Ty Majeski (P)	ThorSport Racing	Ford	134	51	Running	39
16	20	32	Bret Holmes	Bret Holmes Racing	Chevrolet	133	0	Running	21
17	29	44	Conor Daly (i)	Niece Motorsports	Chevrolet	133	0	Running	0
18	17	17	Taylor Gray (P)	Tricon Garage	Toyota	133	0	Running	29
19	32	02	Nathan Byrd (i)	Young's Motorsports	Chevrolet	133	0	Running	0
20	23	1	Brenden Queen	Tricon Garage	Toyota	133	0	Running	17
21	9	13	Jake Garcia	ThorSport Racing	Ford	133	0	Running	16
22	4	99	Ben Rhodes (P)	ThorSport Racing	Ford	133	0	Running	15
23	30	56	Timmy Hill	Hill Motorsports	Toyota	132	0	Running	14
24	8	52	Stewart Friesen	Halmar Friesen Racing	Toyota	132	0	Running	15
25	26	88	Matt Crafton	ThorSport Racing	Ford	132	0	Running	12
26	27	46	Justin Mondeik	Young's Motorsports	Chevrolet	131	0	Running	11
27	10	43	Daniel Dye (P)	McAnally-Hilgemann Racing	Chevrolet	131	0	Running	10
28	28	76	Spencer Boyd	Freedom Racing Enterprises	Chevrolet	129	0	Running	9
29	31	22	Frankie Muniz	Reaume Brothers Racing	Ford	129	0	Running	8
30	24	33	Lawless Alan	Reaume Brothers Racing	Ford	128	0	Running	7
31	34	10	Jennifer Jo Cobb	Jennifer Jo Cobb Racing	Chevrolet	89	0	Electrical	6
32	18	91	Corey Day	McAnally-Hilgemann Racing	Chevrolet	75	0	Accident	5
33	12	42	Matt Mills	Niece Motorsports	Chevrolet	75	0	Accident	4
34	25	04	Marco Andretti	Roper Racing	Chevrolet	43	0	Brakes	3
Official race results

== Standings after the race ==
Drivers' Championship standings

	Pos	Driver	Points
1	1	Corey Heim	3,041
1	2	Christian Eckes	3,038 (-3)
	3	Ty Majeski	3,023 (–18)
	4	Nick Sanchez	3,018 (–23)
	5	Rajah Caruth	3,009 (–32)
2	6	Grant Enfinger	3,007 (–34)
1	7	Tyler Ankrum	3,007 (–34)
	8	Taylor Gray	3,003 (–38)
	9	Ben Rhodes	2,055 (–986)
	10	Daniel Dye	2,055 (–986)
Official driver's standings

Manufacturers' Championship standings

Pos	Manufacturer	Points
1	Chevrolet	705
2	Toyota	668 (-37)
3	Ford	638 (–67)

- Note: Only the first 10 positions are included for the driver standings.

Previous race: 2024 UNOH 200	NASCAR Craftsman Truck Series; 2024 season	Next race: 2024 Love's RV Stop 225
