= Akinori Ogata =

Japanese racing driver (born 1973)

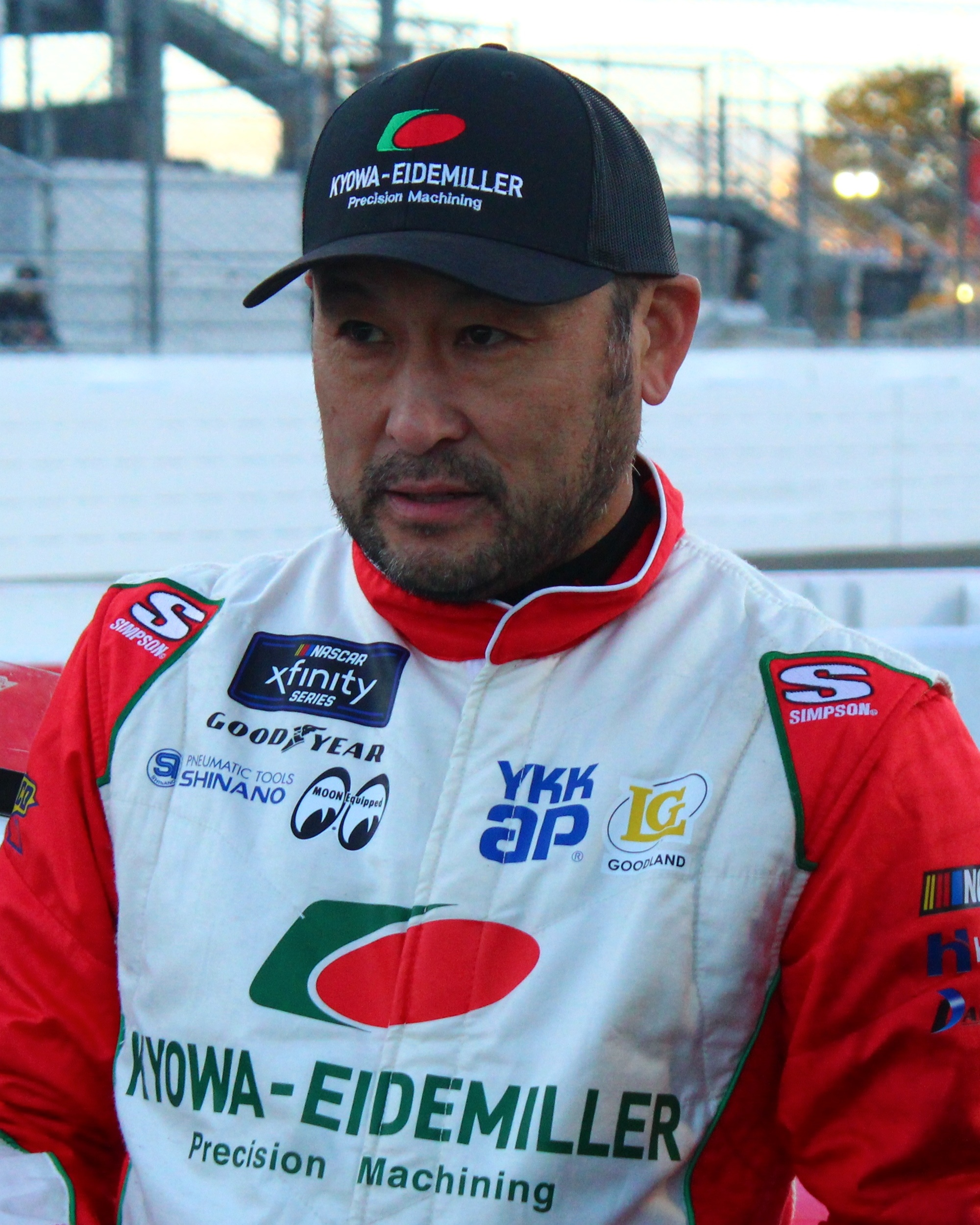
- Ogata at Martinsville Speedway in 2024
- Born: 14 August 1973 (age 53); Kanagawa-ku, Yokohama, Japan
- Achievements: First Japanese driver to win at Hickory Motor Speedway

NASCAR O'Reilly Auto Parts Series career
- 10 races run over 5 years
- 2024 position: 107th
- Best finish: 79th (2018)
- First race: 2018 Whelen Trusted to Perform 200 (Phoenix)
- Last race: 2024 Ambetter Health 302 (Las Vegas)
Wins	Top tens	Poles
0	0	0

NASCAR FedEx Freight Truck Series career
- 17 races run over 11 years
- 2025 position: 66th
- Best finish: 48th (2015)
- First race: 2014 Lucas Oil 150 (Phoenix)
- Last race: 2025 Rackley Roofing 200 (Nashville)
Wins	Top tens	Poles
0	0	0

ARCA Menards Series East career
- 12 races run over 3 years
- Best finish: 26th (2013)
- First race: 2012 Slack Auto Parts 150 (Jefferson)
- Last race: 2014 Autolite Iridium XP 150 (Iowa)
Wins	Top tens	Poles
0	0	0
- Statistics up to date as of 1 November 2025.

Akinori Ogata (尾形 明紀, Ogata Akinori; born 14 August 1973) is a Japanese professional stock car racing driver. He last competed part-time in the NASCAR Craftsman Truck Series, driving the No. 63 Toyota Tundra TRD Pro for Akinori Performance. He has also competed in the NASCAR Xfinity Series and NASCAR K&N Pro Series East in the past.

== Racing career ==
=== Early years ===
Ogata started motocross racing in Japan in 1987, winning thirty feature races. He eventually switched to dirt track racing, racing quarter midgets, and won at Twin Ring Motegi. In 2003, Ogata started racing in the NASCAR Whelen All-American Series Late Model Stock, and has participated in races at Concord Motorsports Park. In 2009, Ogata signed a deal with ENEOS to sponsor his Whelen All-American Series ride, the company's first NASCAR sponsorship.

=== K&N Pro Series East ===
Ogata made his K&N Pro Series East debut in 2012 in Jennifer McDonald's No. 49 Dodge at Gresham Motorsports Park, finishing fifteenth. He competed in three more events with McDonald during the year, this time in a Toyota, crashing in two of them. In 2013, Ogata ran with Sherry Kuykendall's No. 44 and Ronald Faison's No. 39, three of which were with the former, and failed to qualify in the No. 44 at Dover International Speedway. The following year, Ogata competed as an owner/driver in the No. 56 Toyota with Dale Quarterley as crew chief, qualifying in three of five races, but only finished the race at Iowa Speedway.

=== Craftsman Truck Series ===
On 5 November 2014, Win-Tron Racing announced Ogata would make his Camping World Truck Series debut with the team in the No. 35 Toyota, racing in the Lucas Oil 150 at Phoenix International Raceway; this also marked his first career race at Phoenix. After qualifying 28th with a lap time of 28.388 seconds and a speed of 126.814 miles per hour (204.087 km/h), Ogata finished 29th after his rear gear broke on lap 45. Partnering with MB Motorsports for 2015, Ogata ran three races, scoring his first top twenty finish (18th). His only race in 2016 was with MB, but after a crash with Josh Wise early in the UNOH 175, Ogata finished 31st.

Ogata returned to the Truck Series in July 2020, driving the No. 33 Toyota for Reaume Brothers Racing at Texas Motor Speedway. He remained with the team for the 2021 season. At Darlington, he was involved in a very serious crash with Timmy Hill and Tanner Gray. He returned in 2022 to drive the No. 43 for Reaume Brothers Racing at Darlington.

=== Xfinity Series ===
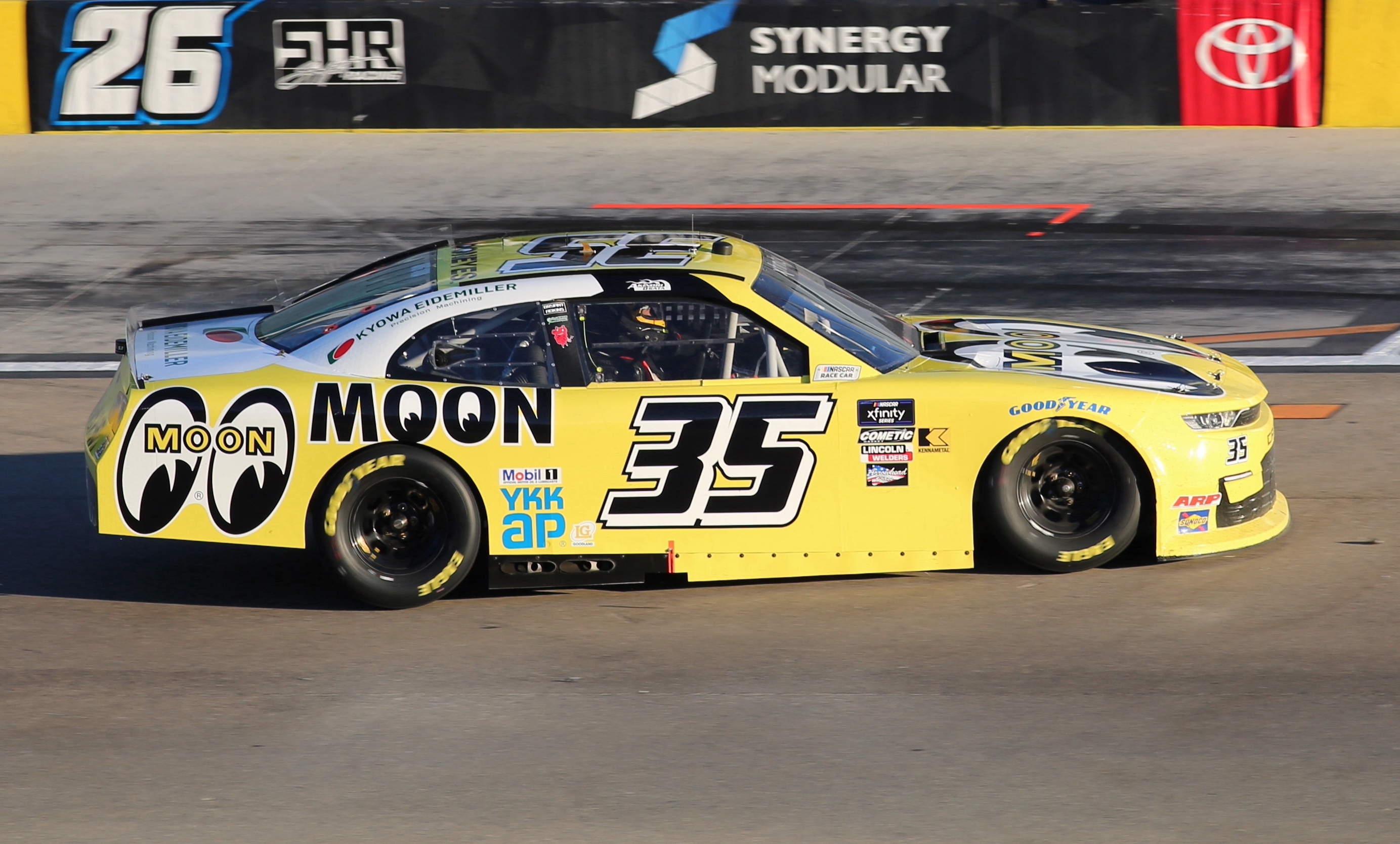
Ogata's No. 35 car at Las Vegas Motor Speedway in 2024

On 31 October 2018, Ogata announced his NASCAR Xfinity Series debut, which would come nearly two weeks later in the Whelen Trusted to Perform 200 at ISM Raceway, driving the No. 66 Toyota Camry for MBM Motorsports.

In 2021, Ogata would make one start in both the No. 52 for Jimmy Means Racing and the No. 78 for B. J. McLeod Motorsports. In 2022, he would return to MBM to drive their No. 13 car in the races at New Hampshire and Texas in September.

== Personal life ==
On 21 December 2016, a thief broke into Ogata's garage, stealing his pickup truck as well as a Legends car for Ogata's son, Ryo. The value of the items taken was around US $80,000.

== Motorsports career results ==
=== NASCAR ===
(key) (Bold – Pole position awarded by qualifying time. Italics – Pole position earned by points standings or practice time. * – Most laps led.)

==== Xfinity Series ====
NASCAR Xfinity Series results
Year	Team	No.	Make	1	2	3	4	5	6	7	8	9	10	11	12	13	14	15	16	17	18	19	20	21	22	23	24	25	26	27	28	29	30	31	32	33	NXSC	Pts	Ref
2018	MBM Motorsports	66	Toyota	DAY	ATL	LVS	PHO	CAL	TEX	BRI	RCH	TAL	DOV	CLT	POC	MCH	IOW	CHI	DAY	KEN	NHA	IOW	GLN	MOH	BRI	ROA	DAR	IND	LVS	RCH	ROV	DOV	KAN	TEX	PHO; 33	HOM	79th	4	
2021	Jimmy Means Racing	52	Chevy	DAY	DRC	HOM	LVS	PHO	ATL	MAR	TAL	DAR	DOV	COA	CLT	MOH	TEX	NSH	POC	ROA	ATL	NHA	GLN	IRC	MCH	DAY	DAR	RCH; 34	BRI	LVS	TAL	ROV	TEX	KAN			98th	0^{1}	
2021	B. J. McLeod Motorsports	78	Toyota																																MAR; 26	PHO	98th	0^{1}	
2022	MBM Motorsports	13	Toyota	DAY	CAL	LVS	PHO	ATL	COA	RCH	MAR	TAL	DOV	DAR	TEX	CLT	PIR	NSH	ROA	ATL	NHA; 25	POC	IRC	MCH; DNQ	GLN	DAY	DAR	KAN; DNQ	BRI	TEX; 35	TAL	ROV	LVS	HOM	MAR	PHO	100th	0^{1}	
2023	Emerling-Gase Motorsports	53	Chevy	DAY	CAL	LVS	PHO	ATL	COA	RCH	MAR	TAL	DOV	DAR	CLT	PIR	SON	NSH	CSC	ATL; 29	NHA	POC	ROA	MCH	IRC	GLN	DAY	DAR	KAN	BRI	TEX	ROV	LVS	HOM	MAR; 33	PHO	99th	0^{1}	
2024	Joey Gase Motorsports	35	Toyota	DAY	ATL	LVS	PHO	COA	RCH	MAR; 38	TEX	TAL	DOV	DAR																							107th	0^{1}	
2024	Joey Gase Motorsports	35	Chevy												CLT; DNQ	PIR	SON	IOW	NHA	NSH	CSC	POC	IND	MCH	DAY; 38	DAR	ATL	GLN	BRI	KAN	TAL	ROV	LVS; 35	HOM	MAR	PHO	107th	0^{1}	

==== Craftsman Truck Series ====
NASCAR Craftsman Truck Series results
Year	Team	No.	Make	1	2	3	4	5	6	7	8	9	10	11	12	13	14	15	16	17	18	19	20	21	22	23	24	25	NCTC	Pts	Ref
2014	Win-Tron Racing	35	Toyota	DAY	MAR	KAN	CLT	DOV	TEX	GTW	KEN	IOW	ELD	POC	MCH	BRI	MSP	CHI	NHA	LVS	TAL	MAR	TEX	PHO; 29	HOM				81st	15	
2015	MB Motorsports	63	Chevy	DAY	ATL	MAR	KAN	CLT	DOV	TEX	GTW	IOW	KEN	ELD	POC	MCH	BRI	MSP	CHI	NHA; 18	LVS; 23	TAL	MAR	TEX	PHO; 27	HOM			48th	64	
2016	MB Motorsports	63	Chevy	DAY	ATL	MAR	KAN	DOV	CLT	TEX	IOW	GTW	KEN	ELD	POC	BRI	MCH	MSP	CHI	NHA; 31	LVS	TAL	MAR	TEX	PHO	HOM			74th	2	
2017	Beaver Motorsports	50	Chevy	DAY	ATL; 30	MAR	KAN	CLT	DOV	TEX	GTW	IOW	KEN	ELD	POC	MCH	BRI	MSP	CHI	NHA	LVS	TAL	MAR	TEX	PHO	HOM			74th	7	
2018	MB Motorsports	63	Chevy	DAY	ATL; 30	LVS	MAR	DOV	KAN	CLT	TEX	IOW	GTW	CHI	KEN	ELD	POC	MCH	BRI	MSP	LVS	TAL	MAR	TEX	PHO	HOM			110th	0^{1}	
2020	Reaume Brothers Racing	33	Toyota	DAY	LVS	CLT	ATL	HOM	POC	KEN	TEX; 25	KAN	KAN	MCH	DRC	DOV	GTW	DAR	RCH	BRI	LVS	TAL	KAN	TEX	MAR	PHO; 30			62nd	19	
2021	Reaume Brothers Racing	33	Toyota	DAY	DRC	LVS	ATL; 37	BRD	RCH	KAN																			76th	13	
2021	Reaume Brothers Racing	34	Toyota								DAR; 34	COA																	76th	13	
2021	Reaume Brothers Racing	33	Chevy										CLT; 28	TEX	NSH	POC	KNX	GLN	GTW	DAR	BRI	LVS	TAL	MAR	PHO				76th	13	
2022	Reaume Brothers Racing	43	Toyota	DAY	LVS	ATL	COA	MAR	BRD	DAR; 36	KAN	TEX	CLT	GTW	SON	KNX	NSH	MOH	POC	IRP	RCH	KAN	BRI	TAL	HOM	PHO			83rd	1	
2023	G2G Racing	46	Toyota	DAY	LVS	ATL; 17	COA	TEX	BRD	MAR	KAN	DAR	NWS; Wth	CLT	GTW	NSH	MOH	POC	RCH	IRP	MLW	KAN	BRI	TAL	HOM	PHO			59th	20	
2024	Young's Motorsports	20	Chevy	DAY	ATL	LVS	BRI	COA	MAR	TEX	KAN	DAR	NWS	CLT	GTW	NSH; 30	POC	IRP	RCH	MLW	BRI	KAN	TAL	HOM	MAR	PHO			71st	7	
2025	Akinori Performance	63	Toyota	DAY	ATL	LVS	HOM; 32	MAR	BRI	CAR	TEX	KAN	NWS	CLT	NSH; 31	MCH	POC	LRP	IRP	GLN	RCH	DAR	BRI	NHA	ROV	TAL	MAR	PHO	66th	11	

^{*} Season still in progress
^{1} Ineligible for series points

==== K&N Pro Series East ====
NASCAR K&N Pro Series East results
Year	Team	No.	Make	1	2	3	4	5	6	7	8	9	10	11	12	13	14	15	16	NKNPSEC	Pts	Ref
2012	MacDonald Motorsports	49	Dodge	BRI	GRE	RCH	IOW	BGS	JFC; 15											34th	84	
2012	MacDonald Motorsports	49	Toyota							LGY; 20	CNB	COL	IOW; 21	NHA; 36	DOV	GRE	CAR			34th	84	
2013	Sherry Kuykendall	44	Toyota	BRI	GRE	FIF	RCH	BGS; 21				IOW; 22	VIR	GRE	NHA; 16	DOV; DNQ	RAL; 21			26th	128	
2013	Ronald Faison	39	Toyota						IOW; 20	LGY	COL									26th	128	
2014	Akinori Performance	56	Toyota	NSM	DAY	BRI; DNQ	GRE	RCH; 31	IOW	BGS	FIF; 20	LGY	NHA; DNQ	COL	IOW; 22	GLN	VIR	GRE	DOV	40th	65	
