= Akinori Performance =

American stock car racing team

- Owner: Akinori Ogata
- Base: Mooresville, North Carolina
- Series: NASCAR Craftsman Truck Series
- Race drivers: Craftsman Truck Series: 63. Akinori Ogata (part-time)
- Manufacturer: Toyota
- Opened: 2014

Career
- Debut: Craftsman Truck Series: 2025 Baptist Health 200 (Homestead); K&N Pro Series East: 2014 Blue Ox 100 (Richmond)
- Latest race: Craftsman Truck Series: 2025 Rackley Roofing 200 (Nashville); K&N Pro Series East: 2014 Autolite Iridium XP 150 (Iowa)
- Races competed: Total: 5 Craftsman Truck Series: 2 K&N Pro Series East: 3
- Drivers' Championships: Total: 0 Craftsman Truck Series: 0 K&N Pro Series East: 0
- Race victories: Total 0 Craftsman Truck Series: 0 K&N Pro Series East: 0
- Pole positions: Total: 0 Craftsman Truck Series: 0 K&N Pro Series East: 0

Akinori Performance is an American stock car racing team that competes in the NASCAR Craftsman Truck Series. The team was founded in 2025 by Akinori Ogata, and they field the No. 63 part-time for Ogata.

== History ==
On February 7, 2025, Akinori Ogata announced the formation of Akinori Performance, a new team that would compete part-time in the Truck Series in 2025. Kyowa Industrial, Mooneyes and YKK AP were announced as the team's primary sponsors.

== Craftsman Truck Series ==
=== Truck No. 63 history ===
The team will run the No. 63 truck part-time in 2025. Ogata will drive the truck along with Kenko Miura. The team would attempt to debut at the Atlanta spring race, but would withdraw due to them not making the best conditions. The team would later make their debut at Homestead, finishing 32nd.

==== Truck No. 63 results ====
Year	Driver	No.	Make	1	2	3	4	5	6	7	8	9	10	11	12	13	14	15	16	17	18	19	20	21	22	23	24	25	Owners	Pts
2025	Akinori Ogata	63	Toyota	DAY	ATL; Wth	LVS	HOM; 32	MAR	BRI	CAR	TEX	KAN	NWS	CLT	NSH; 31	MCH	POC	LRP	IRP	GLN	RCH	DAR	BRI	NHA	ROV	TAL	MAR	PHO	47th	11

== K&N Pro Series East ==
=== Car No. 56 history ===
In 2014, Ogata competed as an owner/driver in the No. 56 Toyota with Dale Quarterley as crew chief. He qualified in three of five races, but only finished the race at Iowa Speedway.

==== Car No. 56 results ====
Year	Driver	No.	Make	1	2	3	4	5	6	7	8	9	10	11	12	13	14	15	16	Owners	Pts
2014	Akinori Ogata	56	Toyota	NSM	DAY	BRI; DNQ	GRE	RCH; 31	IOW	BGS	FIF; 20	LGY	NHA; DNQ	COL	IOW; 22	GLN	VIR	GRE	DOV		
