= 2018 Whelen Trusted to Perform 200 =

32nd race of the 2018 NASCAR Xfinity Series

Race details
- Race 32 of 33 in the 2018 NASCAR Xfinity Series
- Date: November 10, 2018
- Official name: 20th Annual Whelen Trusted to Perform 200
- Location: Avondale, Arizona, ISM Raceway
- Course: Permanent racing facility
- Course length: 1 miles (1.6 km)
- Distance: 200 laps, 200 mi (321.868 km)
- Scheduled distance: 200 laps, 200 mi (321.868 km)
- Average speed: 100.643 miles per hour (161.969 km/h)

Pole position
Driver	John Hunter Nemechek	Chip Ganassi Racing
- Time: 26.970

Most laps led
Driver	Christopher Bell	Joe Gibbs Racing
- Laps: 94

Winner
No. 20	Christopher Bell	Joe Gibbs Racing

Television in the United States
- Network: NBC
- Announcers: Rick Allen, Jeff Burton, Steve Letarte, Dale Earnhardt Jr.

Radio in the United States
- Radio: Motor Racing Network

The 2018 Whelen Trusted to Perform 200 was the 32nd stock car race of the 2018 NASCAR Xfinity Series season, the third and final race in the Round of 8, and the 20th iteration of the event. The race was held on Saturday, November 10, 2018, in Avondale, Arizona, at ISM Raceway, a 1-mile (1.6 km) permanent low-banked tri-oval race track. The race took the scheduled 200 laps to complete. At race's end, Christopher Bell of Joe Gibbs Racing would dominate the late stages of the race to win his eighth career NASCAR Xfinity Series win, his seventh win of the season, and a guaranteed spot in the Championship 4. To fill out the podium, Daniel Hemric and Matt Tifft of Richard Childress Racing would finish second and third, respectively.

== Background ==
The layout of ISM Raceway, the venue where the race was held.

ISM Raceway – also known as PIR – is a one-mile, low-banked tri-oval race track located in Avondale, Arizona. It is named after the nearby metropolitan area of Phoenix. The motorsport track opened in 1964 and currently hosts two NASCAR race weekends annually. PIR has also hosted the IndyCar Series, CART, USAC and the Rolex Sports Car Series. The raceway is currently owned and operated by International Speedway Corporation.

The raceway was originally constructed with a 2.5 mi (4.0 km) road course that ran both inside and outside of the main tri-oval. In 1991 the track was reconfigured with the current 1.51 mi (2.43 km) interior layout. PIR has an estimated grandstand seating capacity of around 67,000. Lights were installed around the track in 2004 following the addition of a second annual NASCAR race weekend.

ISM Raceway is home to two annual NASCAR race weekends, one of 13 facilities on the NASCAR schedule to host more than one race weekend a year. The track is both the first and last stop in the western United States, as well as the fourth and penultimate track on the schedule.

=== Entry list ===
#	Driver	Team	Make	Sponsor
0	Garrett Smithley	JD Motorsports	Chevrolet	Flex Tape
00	Cole Custer	Stewart-Haas Racing with Biagi-DenBeste	Ford	Haas Automation
1	Elliott Sadler	JR Motorsports	Chevrolet	Hunt Brothers Pizza
01	B. J. McLeod	JD Motorsports	Chevrolet	Flex Glue
2	Matt Tifft	Richard Childress Racing	Chevrolet	Go Green Equipment
3	Shane Lee	Richard Childress Racing	Chevrolet	Childress Institute for Pediatric Trauma Race to Give
4	Ross Chastain	JD Motorsports	Chevrolet	Flex Seal
5	Michael Annett	JR Motorsports	Chevrolet	Pilot Flying J
7	Justin Allgaier	JR Motorsports	Chevrolet	Brandt Professional Agriculture
8	Tommy Joe Martins	B. J. McLeod Motorsports	Chevrolet	B. J. McLeod Motorsports
9	Tyler Reddick	JR Motorsports	Chevrolet	BurgerFi
11	Ryan Truex	Kaulig Racing	Chevrolet	LeafFilter Gutter Protection
13	Tyler Hill	MBM Motorsports	Dodge	CrashClaimsR.Us
15	Quin Houff	JD Motorsports	Chevrolet	JD Motorsports
16	Ryan Reed	Roush Fenway Racing	Ford	DriveDownA1C.com
18	Ryan Preece	Joe Gibbs Racing	Toyota	Rheem, Smurfit Kappa
19	Brandon Jones	Joe Gibbs Racing	Toyota	Mobil 1, Toyota Service Centers
20	Christopher Bell	Joe Gibbs Racing	Toyota	GameStop, Just Cause 4
21	Daniel Hemric	Richard Childress Racing	Chevrolet	South Point Hotel, Casino & Spa
22	Austin Cindric	Team Penske	Ford	Discount Tire
23	Spencer Gallagher	GMS Racing	Chevrolet	ISM Connect
35	Joey Gase	Go Green Racing with SS-Green Light Racing	Chevrolet	Donate Life Arizona
36	Alex Labbé	DGM Racing	Chevrolet	Wholey's, Can-Am
38	J. J. Yeley	RSS Racing	Chevrolet	Brown & Brown Insurance, Iron Mountain Data Centers
39	Ryan Sieg	RSS Racing	Chevrolet	Lombard Bros. Gaming
40	Chad Finchum	MBM Motorsports	Toyota	Smithbilt Homes
42	John Hunter Nemechek	Chip Ganassi Racing	Chevrolet	Fire Alarm Services
45	Josh Bilicki	JP Motorsports	Toyota	Prevagen
51	Jeremy Clements	Jeremy Clements Racing	Chevrolet	RepairableVehicles.com
52	David Starr	Jimmy Means Racing	Chevrolet	Whataburger
55	Bayley Currey	JP Motorsports	Toyota	Sierra Auction, Prevagen, C&S Trailers
60	Ty Majeski	Roush Fenway Racing	Ford	Ford
66	Akinori Ogata	MBM Motorsports	Toyota	SEAVAC
74	Mike Harmon	Mike Harmon Racing	Chevrolet	Veterans For Child Rescue
76	Spencer Boyd	SS-Green Light Racing	Chevrolet	Grunt Style "This We'll Defend"
78	Vinnie Miller	B. J. McLeod Motorsports	Chevrolet	B. J. McLeod Motorsports
89	Morgan Shepherd	Shepherd Racing Ventures	Chevrolet	Visone RV Motorhome Parts, Racing with Jesus
90	Donald Theetge	DGM Racing	Chevrolet	Circuit Acura, Mercedes-Benz St-Nicholas
93	Jeff Green	RSS Racing	Chevrolet	RSS Racing
99	Stephen Leicht	B. J. McLeod Motorsports	Chevrolet	B. J. McLeod Motorsports
Official entry list

== Practice ==
=== First practice ===
The first practice session was held on Friday, November 9, at 12:35 PM MST, and would last for 50 minutes. Christopher Bell of Joe Gibbs Racing would set the fastest lap in the session with a time of 27.210 and an average speed of 132.304 miles per hour (212.923 km/h).

Pos.	#	Driver	Team	Make	Time	Speed
1	20	Christopher Bell	Joe Gibbs Racing	Toyota	27.210	132.304
2	18	Ryan Preece	Joe Gibbs Racing	Toyota	27.250	132.110
3	00	Cole Custer	Stewart-Haas Racing with Biagi-DenBeste	Ford	27.335	131.699
Full first practice results

=== Second and final practice ===
The second and final practice session, sometimes referred to as Happy Hour, was held on Friday, November 9, at 2:35 PM MST, and would last for 50 minutes. John Hunter Nemechek of Chip Ganassi Racing would set the fastest lap in the session with a time of 27.053 and an average speed of 133.072 miles per hour (214.159 km/h).

Pos.	#	Driver	Team	Make	Time	Speed
1	42	John Hunter Nemechek	Chip Ganassi Racing	Chevrolet	27.053	133.072
2	20	Christopher Bell	Joe Gibbs Racing	Toyota	27.190	132.402
3	22	Austin Cindric	Team Penske	Ford	27.302	131.858
Full Happy Hour practice results

== Qualifying ==
Qualifying was held on Saturday, November 10, at 10:35 AM MST. Since ISM Raceway is under 2 miles (3.2 km), the qualifying system was a multi-car system that included three rounds. The first round was 15 minutes, where every driver would be able to set a lap within the 15 minutes. Then, the second round would consist of the fastest 24 cars in Round 1, and drivers would have 10 minutes to set a lap. Round 3 consisted of the fastest 12 drivers from Round 2, and the drivers would have 5 minutes to set a time. Whoever was fastest in Round 3 would win the pole.

John Hunter Nemechek of Chip Ganassi Racing would win the pole after making through both preliminary rounds and setting a time of 26.970 and an average speed of 133.482 miles per hour (214.818 km/h) in the third round.

No drivers would fail to qualify.

=== Full qualifying results ===
Pos.	#	Driver	Team	Make	Time (R1)	Speed (R1)	Time (R2)	Speed (R2)	Time (R3)	Speed (R3)
1	42	John Hunter Nemechek	Chip Ganassi Racing	Chevrolet	27.287	131.931	26.957	133.546	26.970	133.482
2	00	Cole Custer	Stewart-Haas Racing with Biagi-DenBeste	Ford	27.339	131.680	26.986	133.403	26.987	133.398
3	22	Austin Cindric	Team Penske	Ford	27.220	132.256	27.090	132.890	27.058	133.048
4	7	Justin Allgaier	JR Motorsports	Chevrolet	27.328	131.733	27.178	132.460	27.081	132.935
5	18	Ryan Preece	Joe Gibbs Racing	Toyota	27.467	131.066	27.087	132.905	27.121	132.738
6	1	Elliott Sadler	JR Motorsports	Chevrolet	27.574	130.558	27.150	132.597	27.174	132.480
7	19	Brandon Jones	Joe Gibbs Racing	Toyota	27.255	132.086	27.173	132.484	27.216	132.275
8	21	Daniel Hemric	Richard Childress Racing	Chevrolet	27.653	130.185	27.199	132.358	27.228	132.217
9	3	Shane Lee	Richard Childress Racing	Chevrolet	27.440	131.195	27.320	131.772	27.230	132.207
10	2	Matt Tifft	Richard Childress Racing	Chevrolet	27.543	130.705	27.240	132.159	27.254	132.091
11	23	Spencer Gallagher	GMS Racing	Chevrolet	27.781	129.585	27.399	131.392	27.319	131.776
12	16	Ryan Reed	Roush Fenway Racing	Ford	27.647	130.213	27.399	131.392	27.479	131.009
Eliminated in Round 2
13	5	Michael Annett	JR Motorsports	Chevrolet	27.788	129.552	27.399	131.392	—	—
14	9	Tyler Reddick	JR Motorsports	Chevrolet	27.712	129.908	27.414	131.320	—	—
15	11	Ryan Truex	Kaulig Racing	Chevrolet	27.555	130.648	27.478	131.014	—	—
16	39	Ryan Sieg	RSS Racing	Chevrolet	27.619	130.345	27.487	130.971	—	—
17	36	Alex Labbé	DGM Racing	Chevrolet	27.912	128.977	27.710	129.917	—	—
18	51	Jeremy Clements	Jeremy Clements Racing	Chevrolet	27.863	129.204	27.719	129.875	—	—
19	38	J. J. Yeley	RSS Racing	Chevrolet	28.066	128.269	27.928	128.903	—	—
20	8	Tommy Joe Martins	B. J. McLeod Motorsports	Chevrolet	27.986	128.636	27.986	128.636	—	—
21	35	Joey Gase	Go Green Racing with SS-Green Light Racing	Chevrolet	28.142	127.923	28.006	128.544	—	—
22	40	Chad Finchum	MBM Motorsports	Toyota	28.128	127.986	28.151	127.882	—	—
23	4	Ross Chastain	JD Motorsports	Chevrolet	27.723	129.856	—	—	—	—
24	52	David Starr	Jimmy Means Racing	Chevrolet	28.124	128.005	—	—	—	—
Eliminated in Round 1
25	93	Jeff Green	RSS Racing	Chevrolet	28.227	127.537	—	—	—	—
26	90	Donald Theetge	DGM Racing	Chevrolet	28.294	127.235	—	—	—	—
27	0	Garrett Smithley	JD Motorsports	Chevrolet	28.308	127.173	—	—	—	—
28	01	B. J. McLeod	JD Motorsports	Chevrolet	28.353	126.971	—	—	—	—
29	15	Quin Houff	JD Motorsports	Chevrolet	28.415	126.694	—	—	—	—
30	99	Stephen Leicht	B. J. McLeod Motorsports	Chevrolet	28.566	126.024	—	—	—	—
31	13	Tyler Hill	MBM Motorsports	Dodge	28.624	125.769	—	—	—	—
32	76	Spencer Boyd	SS-Green Light Racing	Chevrolet	28.649	125.659	—	—	—	—
33	66	Akinori Ogata	MBM Motorsports	Toyota	28.737	125.274	—	—	—	—
Qualified by owner's points
34	55	Bayley Currey	JP Motorsports	Toyota	28.843	124.814	—	—	—	—
35	89	Morgan Shepherd	Shepherd Racing Ventures	Chevrolet	28.863	124.727	—	—	—	—
36	74	Mike Harmon	Mike Harmon Racing	Chevrolet	29.153	123.486	—	—	—	—
37	78	Vinnie Miller	B. J. McLeod Motorsports	Chevrolet	29.287	122.921	—	—	—	—
38	20	Christopher Bell	Joe Gibbs Racing	Toyota	—	—	—	—	—	—
39	60	Ty Majeski	Roush Fenway Racing	Ford	—	—	—	—	—	—
40	45	Josh Bilicki	JP Motorsports	Toyota	—	—	—	—	—	—
Official qualifying results
Official starting lineup

== Race results ==
Stage 1 Laps: 45

Pos.	#	Driver	Team	Make	Pts
1	7	Justin Allgaier	JR Motorsports	Chevrolet	10
2	22	Austin Cindric	Team Penske	Ford	9
3	21	Daniel Hemric	Richard Childress Racing	Chevrolet	8
4	42	John Hunter Nemechek	Chip Ganassi Racing	Chevrolet	7
5	00	Cole Custer	Stewart-Haas Racing with Biagi-DenBeste	Ford	6
6	2	Matt Tifft	Richard Childress Racing	Chevrolet	5
7	19	Brandon Jones	Joe Gibbs Racing	Toyota	4
8	18	Ryan Preece	Joe Gibbs Racing	Toyota	3
9	9	Tyler Reddick	JR Motorsports	Chevrolet	2
10	20	Christopher Bell	Joe Gibbs Racing	Toyota	1

Stage 2 Laps: 45

Pos.	#	Driver	Team	Make	Pts
1	7	Justin Allgaier	JR Motorsports	Chevrolet	10
2	42	John Hunter Nemechek	Chip Ganassi Racing	Chevrolet	9
3	22	Austin Cindric	Team Penske	Ford	8
4	20	Christopher Bell	Joe Gibbs Racing	Toyota	7
5	21	Daniel Hemric	Richard Childress Racing	Chevrolet	6
6	00	Cole Custer	Stewart-Haas Racing with Biagi-DenBeste	Ford	5
7	9	Tyler Reddick	JR Motorsports	Chevrolet	4
8	18	Ryan Preece	Joe Gibbs Racing	Toyota	3
9	2	Matt Tifft	Richard Childress Racing	Chevrolet	2
10	16	Ryan Reed	Roush Fenway Racing	Ford	1

Stage 3 Laps: 110

Fin	St	#	Driver	Team	Make	Laps	Led	Status	Pts
1	38	20	Christopher Bell	Joe Gibbs Racing	Toyota	200	94	running	48
2	8	21	Daniel Hemric	Richard Childress Racing	Chevrolet	200	1	running	49
3	10	2	Matt Tifft	Richard Childress Racing	Chevrolet	200	0	running	41
4	3	22	Austin Cindric	Team Penske	Ford	200	3	running	50
5	5	18	Ryan Preece	Joe Gibbs Racing	Toyota	200	0	running	38
6	14	9	Tyler Reddick	JR Motorsports	Chevrolet	200	0	running	37
7	7	19	Brandon Jones	Joe Gibbs Racing	Toyota	200	0	running	34
8	2	00	Cole Custer	Stewart-Haas Racing with Biagi-DenBeste	Ford	200	0	running	40
9	1	42	John Hunter Nemechek	Chip Ganassi Racing	Chevrolet	200	33	running	44
10	11	23	Spencer Gallagher	GMS Racing	Chevrolet	200	0	running	27
11	6	1	Elliott Sadler	JR Motorsports	Chevrolet	200	0	running	26
12	12	16	Ryan Reed	Roush Fenway Racing	Ford	200	0	running	26
13	15	11	Ryan Truex	Kaulig Racing	Chevrolet	200	0	running	24
14	9	3	Shane Lee	Richard Childress Racing	Chevrolet	200	0	running	23
15	23	4	Ross Chastain	JD Motorsports	Chevrolet	200	0	running	22
16	13	5	Michael Annett	JR Motorsports	Chevrolet	200	0	running	21
17	18	51	Jeremy Clements	Jeremy Clements Racing	Chevrolet	200	0	running	20
18	39	60	Ty Majeski	Roush Fenway Racing	Ford	199	0	running	19
19	16	39	Ryan Sieg	RSS Racing	Chevrolet	199	0	running	18
20	17	36	Alex Labbé	DGM Racing	Chevrolet	199	0	running	17
21	19	38	J. J. Yeley	RSS Racing	Chevrolet	199	0	running	16
22	21	35	Joey Gase	Go Green Racing with SS-Green Light Racing	Chevrolet	199	0	running	15
23	28	01	B. J. McLeod	JD Motorsports	Chevrolet	199	0	running	14
24	4	7	Justin Allgaier	JR Motorsports	Chevrolet	199	69	running	33
25	26	90	Donald Theetge	DGM Racing	Chevrolet	197	0	running	12
26	27	0	Garrett Smithley	JD Motorsports	Chevrolet	197	0	running	11
27	24	52	David Starr	Jimmy Means Racing	Chevrolet	197	0	running	10
28	32	76	Spencer Boyd	SS-Green Light Racing	Chevrolet	197	0	running	9
29	29	15	Quin Houff	JD Motorsports	Chevrolet	196	0	running	8
30	34	55	Bayley Currey	JP Motorsports	Toyota	193	0	running	0
31	31	13	Tyler Hill	MBM Motorsports	Dodge	185	0	running	6
32	36	74	Mike Harmon	Mike Harmon Racing	Chevrolet	181	0	running	5
33	33	66	Akinori Ogata	MBM Motorsports	Toyota	179	0	running	4
34	40	45	Josh Bilicki	JP Motorsports	Toyota	158	0	running	3
35	20	8	Tommy Joe Martins	B. J. McLeod Motorsports	Chevrolet	151	0	engine	2
36	37	78	Vinnie Miller	B. J. McLeod Motorsports	Chevrolet	144	0	ignition	1
37	22	40	Chad Finchum	MBM Motorsports	Toyota	143	0	rear gear	1
38	30	99	Stephen Leicht	B. J. McLeod Motorsports	Chevrolet	27	0	suspension	1
39	35	89	Morgan Shepherd	Shepherd Racing Ventures	Chevrolet	22	0	brakes	1
40	25	93	Jeff Green	RSS Racing	Chevrolet	18	0	brakes	1
Official race results

Previous race: 2018 O'Reilly Auto Parts 300	NASCAR Xfinity Series; 2018 season	Next race: 2018 Ford EcoBoost 300
