= 2025 Rackley Roofing 200 =

12th race of the 2025 NASCAR Craftsman Truck Series

Race details
- Race 12 of 25 of the 2025 NASCAR Craftsman Truck Series
- Date: May 30, 2025
- Location: Nashville Superspeedway in Lebanon, Tennessee
- Course: Permanent racing facility
- Course length: 1.333 miles (2.145 km)
- Distance: 150 laps, 199 mi (321 km)
- Scheduled distance: 150 laps, 199 mi (321 km)
- Average speed: 116.591 mph (187.635 km/h)

Pole position
Driver	Corey Heim	Tricon Garage
- Grid positions set by competition-based formula

Most laps led
Driver	Rajah Caruth	Spire Motorsports
- Laps: 61

Winner
No. 71	Rajah Caruth	Spire Motorsports

Television in the United States
- Network: FS1
- Announcers: Jamie Little, Regan Smith, and Michael Waltrip

Radio in the United States
- Radio: NRN

The 2025 Rackley Roofing 200 was the 12th stock car race of the 2025 NASCAR Craftsman Truck Series, and the 5th iteration of the event. The race was held on Friday, May 30, 2025, at Nashville Superspeedway in Lebanon, Tennessee, a 1.333 miles (2.145 km) permanent asphalt tri-oval shaped racetrack. The race took the scheduled 150 laps to complete.

In an action-packed finish, Rajah Caruth, driving for Spire Motorsports, held off late-race charges from Corey Heim and Layne Riggs to earn his second career NASCAR Craftsman Truck Series win, and his first of the season. Riggs and Heim won stage one and two respectively, while Caruth dominated the final stage, leading a race-high 61 laps. Daniel Hemric and Corey Day rounded out the top five, while Kaden Honeycutt, Chandler Smith, Ty Majeski, Bayley Currey, and Grant Enfinger rounded out the top ten.

== Report ==
=== Background ===
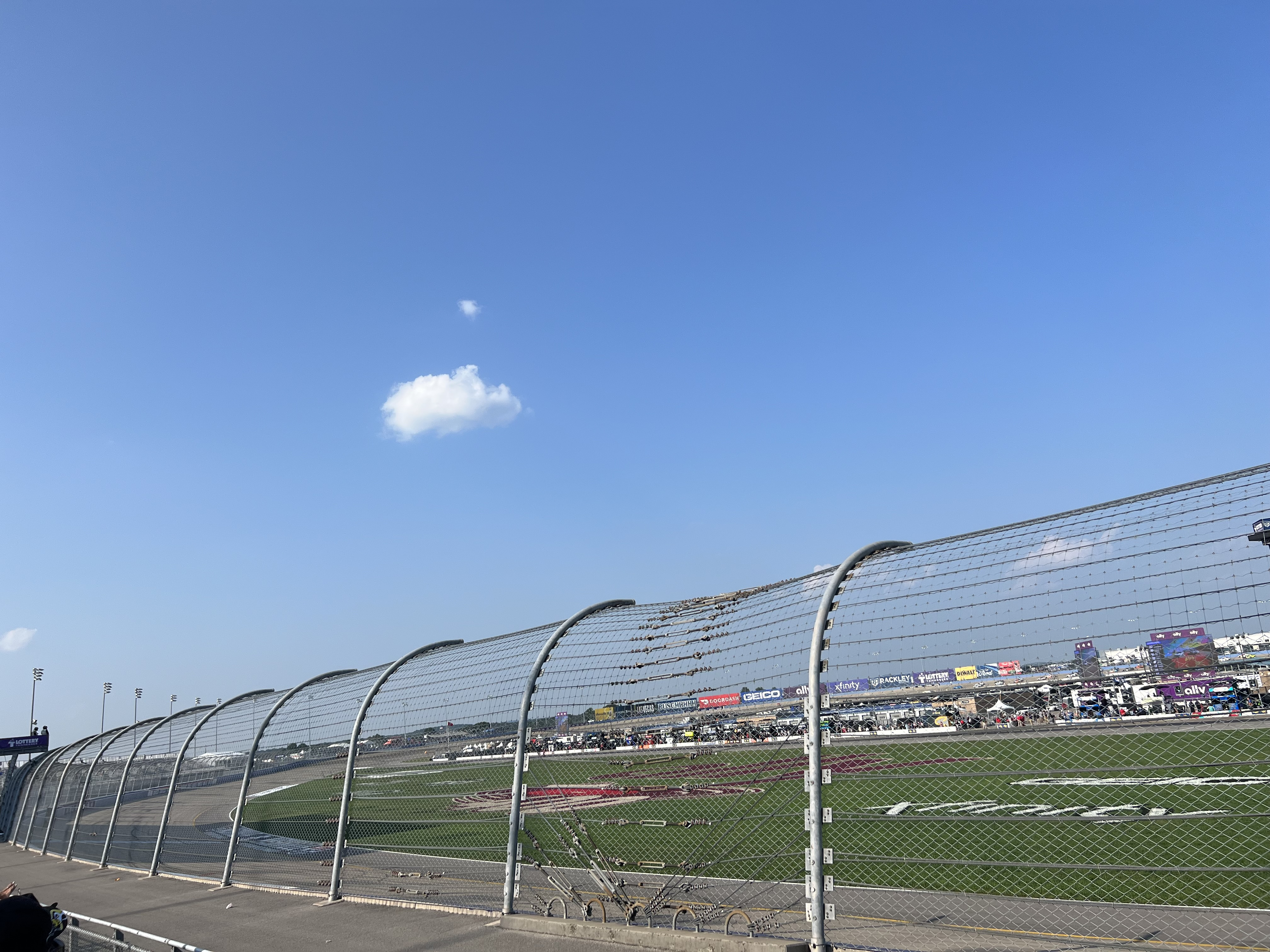
Nashville Superspeedway, the track where the race was held.

Nashville Superspeedway is a motor racing complex located in Lebanon, Tennessee, United States, about 30 miles (48 km) southeast of Nashville. The track was built in 2001 and is currently used for events, driving schools and GT Academy, a reality television competition.

It is a concrete oval track 1 1/3 miles (2.146 km) long. Nashville Superspeedway is owned by Dover Motorsports, Inc., which also owns Dover International Speedway. Nashville Superspeedway was the longest concrete oval in NASCAR during the time it was on the NASCAR Xfinity Series and NASCAR Craftsman Truck Series circuits. Current permanent seating capacity is approximately 25,000. Additional portable seats are brought in for some events, and seating capacity can be expanded to 150,000. Infrastructure is in place to expand the facility to include a short track, drag strip, and road course.

==== Entry list ====
- (R) denotes rookie driver.
- (i) denotes driver who is ineligible for series driver points.

#	Driver	Team	Make
1	William Sawalich (i)	Tricon Garage	Toyota
02	Nathan Byrd	Young's Motorsports	Chevrolet
2	Clayton Green	Reaume Brothers Racing	Ford
5	Toni Breidinger (R)	Tricon Garage	Toyota
07	Kyle Busch (i)	Spire Motorsports	Chevrolet
7	Corey Day (i)	Spire Motorsports	Chevrolet
9	Grant Enfinger	CR7 Motorsports	Chevrolet
11	Corey Heim	Tricon Garage	Toyota
13	Jake Garcia	ThorSport Racing	Ford
15	Tanner Gray	Tricon Garage	Toyota
17	Gio Ruggiero (R)	Tricon Garage	Toyota
18	Tyler Ankrum	McAnally-Hilgemann Racing	Chevrolet
19	Daniel Hemric	McAnally-Hilgemann Racing	Chevrolet
22	Tyler Tomassi (i)	Reaume Brothers Racing	Ford
26	Dawson Sutton (R)	Rackley W.A.R.	Chevrolet
33	Frankie Muniz (R)	Reaume Brothers Racing	Ford
34	Layne Riggs	Front Row Motorsports	Ford
38	Chandler Smith	Front Row Motorsports	Ford
42	Matt Mills	Niece Motorsports	Chevrolet
44	Bayley Currey	Niece Motorsports	Chevrolet
45	Kaden Honeycutt	Niece Motorsports	Chevrolet
52	Stewart Friesen	Halmar Friesen Racing	Toyota
63	Akinori Ogata	Akinori Performance	Toyota
66	Luke Fenhaus (R)	ThorSport Racing	Ford
71	Rajah Caruth	Spire Motorsports	Chevrolet
76	Spencer Boyd	Freedom Racing Enterprises	Chevrolet
77	Andrés Pérez de Lara (R)	Spire Motorsports	Chevrolet
81	Connor Mosack (R)	McAnally-Hilgemann Racing	Chevrolet
88	Matt Crafton	ThorSport Racing	Ford
91	Jack Wood	McAnally-Hilgemann Racing	Chevrolet
98	Ty Majeski	ThorSport Racing	Ford
99	Ben Rhodes	ThorSport Racing	Ford
Official entry list

== Practice ==
Practice was originally scheduled to be held on Friday, May 30, at 3:05 PM CST, with two 25-minute group sessions, but was postponed until 4:00 PM due to inclement weather. Because of this, only one session was run, and lasted for 45 minutes. Corey Heim, driving for Tricon Garage, would set the fastest time in the session, with a lap of 30.059, and a speed of 159.287 mph (256.348 km/h).

Pos.	#	Driver	Team	Make	Time	Speed
1	11	Corey Heim	Tricon Garage	Toyota	30.059	159.287
2	98	Ty Majeski	ThorSport Racing	Ford	30.227	158.401
3	71	Rajah Caruth	Spire Motorsports	Chevrolet	30.234	158.365
Full practice results

== Starting lineup ==
Qualifying was originally scheduled to be held on Friday, May 30, at 4:10 PM CST, but was cancelled due to inclement weather. The starting lineup would be determined by the performance metric system. As a result, Corey Heim, driving for Tricon Garage, will start on the pole.

No drivers would fail to qualify.

=== Starting lineup ===
Pos.	#	Driver	Team	Make
1	11	Corey Heim	Tricon Garage	Toyota
2	45	Kaden Honeycutt	Niece Motorsports	Chevrolet
3	34	Layne Riggs	Front Row Motorsports	Ford
4	9	Grant Enfinger	CR7 Motorsports	Chevrolet
5	7	Corey Day (i)	Spire Motorsports	Chevrolet
6	44	Bayley Currey	Niece Motorsports	Chevrolet
7	19	Daniel Hemric	McAnally-Hilgemann Racing	Chevrolet
8	18	Tyler Ankrum	McAnally-Hilgemann Racing	Chevrolet
9	13	Jake Garcia	ThorSport Racing	Ford
10	71	Rajah Caruth	Spire Motorsports	Chevrolet
11	42	Matt Mills	Niece Motorsports	Chevrolet
12	07	Kyle Busch (i)	Spire Motorsports	Chevrolet
13	52	Stewart Friesen	Halmar Friesen Racing	Toyota
14	1	William Sawalich (i)	Tricon Garage	Toyota
15	99	Ben Rhodes	ThorSport Racing	Ford
16	77	Andrés Pérez de Lara (R)	Spire Motorsports	Chevrolet
17	17	Gio Ruggiero (R)	Tricon Garage	Toyota
18	88	Matt Crafton	ThorSport Racing	Ford
19	66	Luke Fenhaus (R)	ThorSport Racing	Ford
20	81	Connor Mosack (R)	McAnally-Hilgemann Racing	Chevrolet
21	15	Tanner Gray	Tricon Garage	Toyota
22	91	Jack Wood	McAnally-Hilgemann Racing	Chevrolet
23	38	Chandler Smith	Front Row Motorsports	Ford
24	02	Nathan Byrd	Young's Motorsports	Chevrolet
25	76	Spencer Boyd	Freedom Racing Enterprises	Chevrolet
26	98	Ty Majeski	ThorSport Racing	Ford
27	33	Frankie Muniz (R)	Reaume Brothers Racing	Ford
28	22	Tyler Tomassi (i)	Reaume Brothers Racing	Ford
29	26	Dawson Sutton (R)	Rackley W.A.R.	Chevrolet
30	5	Toni Breidinger (R)	Tricon Garage	Toyota
31	2	Clayton Green	Reaume Brothers Racing	Ford
32	63	Akinori Ogata	Akinori Performance	Toyota
Official starting lineup

== Race results ==
Stage 1 Laps: 45

Pos.	#	Driver	Team	Make	Pts
1	34	Layne Riggs	Front Row Motorsports	Ford	10
2	11	Corey Heim	Tricon Garage	Toyota	9
3	71	Rajah Caruth	Spire Motorsports	Chevrolet	8
4	19	Daniel Hemric	McAnally-Hilgemann Racing	Chevrolet	7
5	45	Kaden Honeycutt	Niece Motorsports	Chevrolet	6
6	7	Corey Day (i)	Spire Motorsports	Chevrolet	0
7	18	Tyler Ankrum	McAnally-Hilgemann Racing	Chevrolet	4
8	9	Grant Enfinger	CR7 Motorsports	Chevrolet	3
9	44	Bayley Currey	Niece Motorsports	Chevrolet	2
10	99	Ben Rhodes	ThorSport Racing	Ford	1

Stage 2 Laps: 50

Pos.	#	Driver	Team	Make	Pts
1	11	Corey Heim	Tricon Garage	Toyota	10
2	34	Layne Riggs	Front Row Motorsports	Ford	9
3	71	Rajah Caruth	Spire Motorsports	Chevrolet	8
4	7	Corey Day (i)	Spire Motorsports	Chevrolet	0
5	45	Kaden Honeycutt	Niece Motorsports	Chevrolet	6
6	9	Grant Enfinger	CR7 Motorsports	Chevrolet	5
7	44	Bayley Currey	Niece Motorsports	Chevrolet	4
8	19	Daniel Hemric	McAnally-Hilgemann Racing	Chevrolet	3
9	13	Jake Garcia	ThorSport Racing	Ford	2
10	26	Dawson Sutton (R)	Rackley W.A.R.	Chevrolet	1

Stage 3 Laps: 55

Fin	St	#	Driver	Team	Make	Laps	Led	Status	Pts
1	10	71	Rajah Caruth	Spire Motorsports	Chevrolet	150	61	Running	56
2	1	11	Corey Heim	Tricon Garage	Toyota	150	58	Running	55
3	3	34	Layne Riggs	Front Row Motorsports	Ford	150	30	Running	53
4	7	19	Daniel Hemric	McAnally-Hilgemann Racing	Chevrolet	150	0	Running	43
5	5	7	Corey Day (i)	Spire Motorsports	Chevrolet	150	1	Running	0
6	2	45	Kaden Honeycutt	Niece Motorsports	Chevrolet	150	0	Running	43
7	23	38	Chandler Smith	Front Row Motorsports	Ford	150	0	Running	30
8	26	98	Ty Majeski	ThorSport Racing	Ford	150	0	Running	29
9	6	44	Bayley Currey	Niece Motorsports	Chevrolet	150	0	Running	34
10	4	9	Grant Enfinger	CR7 Motorsports	Chevrolet	150	0	Running	35
11	29	26	Dawson Sutton (R)	Rackley W.A.R.	Chevrolet	150	0	Running	27
12	9	13	Jake Garcia	ThorSport Racing	Ford	150	0	Running	27
13	17	17	Gio Ruggiero (R)	Tricon Garage	Toyota	150	0	Running	24
14	15	99	Ben Rhodes	ThorSport Racing	Ford	150	0	Running	24
15	12	07	Kyle Busch (i)	Spire Motorsports	Chevrolet	150	0	Running	0
16	21	15	Tanner Gray	Tricon Garage	Toyota	150	0	Running	21
17	8	18	Tyler Ankrum	McAnally-Hilgemann Racing	Chevrolet	150	0	Running	24
18	19	66	Luke Fenhaus (R)	ThorSport Racing	Ford	150	0	Running	19
19	16	77	Andrés Pérez de Lara (R)	Spire Motorsports	Chevrolet	150	0	Running	18
20	22	91	Jack Wood	McAnally-Hilgemann Racing	Chevrolet	150	0	Running	17
21	13	52	Stewart Friesen	Halmar Friesen Racing	Toyota	150	0	Running	16
22	11	42	Matt Mills	Niece Motorsports	Chevrolet	150	0	Running	15
23	20	81	Connor Mosack (R)	McAnally-Hilgemann Racing	Chevrolet	150	0	Running	14
24	14	1	William Sawalich (i)	Tricon Garage	Toyota	149	0	Running	0
25	18	88	Matt Crafton	ThorSport Racing	Ford	149	0	Running	12
26	25	76	Spencer Boyd	Freedom Racing Enterprises	Chevrolet	148	0	Running	11
27	31	2	Clayton Green	Reaume Brothers Racing	Ford	148	0	Running	10
28	24	02	Nathan Byrd	Young's Motorsports	Chevrolet	147	0	Running	9
29	28	22	Tyler Tomassi (i)	Reaume Brothers Racing	Ford	147	0	Running	0
30	30	5	Toni Breidinger (R)	Tricon Garage	Toyota	144	0	Running	7
31	32	63	Akinori Ogata	Akinori Performance	Toyota	144	0	Running	6
32	27	33	Frankie Muniz (R)	Reaume Brothers Racing	Ford	2	0	Engine	5
Official race results

== Standings after the race ==
Drivers' Championship standings

	Pos	Driver	Points
	1	Corey Heim	566
1	2	Daniel Hemric	444 (-122)
1	3	Chandler Smith	401 (–125)
	4	Tyler Ankrum	406 (–160)
	5	Grant Enfinger	406 (–160)
	6	Layne Riggs	395 (–171)
	7	Kaden Honeycutt	378 (–188)
	8	Jake Garcia	359 (–207)
	9	Ty Majeski	356 (–210)
3	10	Rajah Caruth	330 (–236)
Official driver's standings

Manufacturers' Championship standings

Pos	Manufacturer	Points
1	Chevrolet	477
2	Toyota	459 (-18)
3	Ford	437 (–40)

- Note: Only the first 10 positions are included for the driver standings.

Previous race: 2025 North Carolina Education Lottery 200	NASCAR Craftsman Truck Series; 2025 season	Next race: 2025 DQS Solutions & Staffing 250
