= 2024 BetMGM 300 =

12th race of the 2024 NASCAR Xfinity Series

Race details
- Race 12 of 33 in the 2024 NASCAR Xfinity Series
- Date: May 25, 2024
- Official name: 43rd Annual BetMGM 300
- Location: Charlotte Motor Speedway in Concord, North Carolina
- Course: Permanent racing facility
- Course length: 1.5 miles (2.4 km)
- Distance: 200 laps, 300 mi (480 km)
- Scheduled distance: 200 laps, 300 mi (480 km)
- Average speed: 115.053 mph (185.160 km/h)

Pole position
Driver	Ty Gibbs	Joe Gibbs Racing
- Time: 30.475

Most laps led
Driver	Sam Mayer	JR Motorsports
- Laps: 44

Winner
No. 17	Chase Elliott	Hendrick Motorsports

Television in the United States
- Network: Fox
- Announcers: Joey Logano, Ryan Blaney, and Erik Jones

Radio in the United States
- Radio: PRN

The 2024 BetMGM 300 was the 12th stock car race of the 2024 NASCAR Xfinity Series, and the 47th iteration of the event. The race was held on Saturday, May 25, 2024, in Concord, North Carolina at Charlotte Motor Speedway, a 1.5 miles (2.4 km) permanent asphalt tri-oval shaped intermediate speedway. The race took the scheduled 200 laps to complete. In a wild race with numerous lead changes, Chase Elliott, driving for Hendrick Motorsports, stole the win after a successful late race strategy, leading the final 18 laps of the race to earn his sixth career NASCAR Xfinity Series win, and his first of the season. Justin Allgaier, who started in 9th, won both stages and led 40 laps, before being spun by Ty Gibbs with 24 laps to go. Sam Mayer led a race-high 44 laps and finished fourth. To fill out the podium, Brandon Jones and Sammy Smith, both driving for JR Motorsports, finished 2nd and 3rd, respectively.

This was the final series start of Kyle Busch, the all-time wins leader in series history, before his unexpected death two years later.

== Report ==
=== Background ===
Charlotte Motor Speedway, the circuit where the race was held

The race was held at Charlotte Motor Speedway, located in Concord, North Carolina. The speedway complex includes a 1.5-mile (2.4 km) quad-oval track that was utilized for the race, as well as a dragstrip and a dirt track. The speedway was built in 1959 by Bruton Smith and is considered the home track for NASCAR, with many race teams based in the Charlotte metropolitan area. The track is owned and operated by Speedway Motorsports Inc. (SMI) with Marcus G. Smith serving as track president.

==== Entry list ====
- (R) denotes rookie driver.
- (i) denotes driver who is ineligible for series driver points.

#	Driver	Team	Make
00	Cole Custer	Stewart–Haas Racing	Ford
1	Sam Mayer	JR Motorsports	Chevrolet
2	Jesse Love (R)	Richard Childress Racing	Chevrolet
4	Dawson Cram (R)	JD Motorsports	Chevrolet
5	Anthony Alfredo	Our Motorsports	Chevrolet
6	Garrett Smithley	JD Motorsports	Chevrolet
07	Patrick Emerling	SS-Green Light Racing	Chevrolet
7	Justin Allgaier	JR Motorsports	Chevrolet
8	Sammy Smith	JR Motorsports	Chevrolet
9	Brandon Jones	JR Motorsports	Chevrolet
11	Josh Williams	Kaulig Racing	Chevrolet
14	J. J. Yeley	SS-Green Light Racing	Chevrolet
15	Hailie Deegan (R)	AM Racing	Ford
16	A. J. Allmendinger	Kaulig Racing	Chevrolet
17	Chase Elliott (i)	Hendrick Motorsports	Chevrolet
18	Sheldon Creed	Joe Gibbs Racing	Toyota
19	Taylor Gray (i)	Joe Gibbs Racing	Toyota
20	Ty Gibbs (i)	Joe Gibbs Racing	Toyota
21	Austin Hill	Richard Childress Racing	Chevrolet
26	Dean Thompson (i)	Sam Hunt Racing	Toyota
27	Jeb Burton	Jordan Anderson Racing	Chevrolet
28	Kyle Sieg	RSS Racing	Ford
29	Blaine Perkins	RSS Racing	Ford
30	Noah Gragson (i)	Rette Jones Racing	Ford
31	Parker Retzlaff	Jordan Anderson Racing	Chevrolet
33	Kyle Busch (i)	Richard Childress Racing	Chevrolet
35	Akinori Ogata	Joey Gase Motorsports	Chevrolet
38	Matt DiBenedetto	RSS Racing	Ford
39	Ryan Sieg	RSS Racing	Ford
42	Leland Honeyman (R)	Young's Motorsports	Chevrolet
43	Ryan Ellis	Alpha Prime Racing	Chevrolet
44	Brennan Poole	Alpha Prime Racing	Chevrolet
48	Parker Kligerman	Big Machine Racing	Chevrolet
51	Jeremy Clements	Jeremy Clements Racing	Chevrolet
74	Jade Buford	Mike Harmon Racing	Chevrolet
81	Chandler Smith	Joe Gibbs Racing	Toyota
91	Kyle Weatherman	DGM Racing	Chevrolet
92	Natalie Decker	DGM Racing	Chevrolet
97	Shane van Gisbergen (R)	Kaulig Racing	Chevrolet
98	Riley Herbst	Stewart–Haas Racing	Ford
Official entry list

== Practice ==
The first and only practice was held on Friday, May 24, at 3:35 PM EST, and lasted for 20 minutes. Cole Custer, driving for Stewart–Haas Racing, set the fastest time in the session, with a lap of 30.616, and a speed of 176.378 mph (283.853 km/h).

Pos.	#	Driver	Team	Make	Time	Speed
1	00	Cole Custer	Stewart–Haas Racing	Ford	30.616	176.378
2	21	Austin Hill	Richard Childress Racing	Chevrolet	30.684	175.987
3	7	Justin Allgaier	JR Motorsports	Chevrolet	30.779	175.444
Full practice results

== Qualifying ==
Qualifying was held on Friday, May 24, at 4:05 PM EST. Since Charlotte Motor Speedway is an intermediate speedway, the qualifying system used is a single-car, one-lap system with only one round. Drivers were on track by themselves, and had one lap to post a qualifying time. Whoever set the fastest time in that round would win the pole.

Ty Gibbs, driving for Joe Gibbs Racing, scored the pole for the race, with a lap of 30.475, and a speed of 177.194 mph (285.166 km/h).

Two drivers failed to qualify: Jade Buford and Akinori Ogata.

=== Qualifying results ===
Pos.	#	Driver	Team	Make	Time	Speed
1	20	Ty Gibbs (i)	Joe Gibbs Racing	Toyota	30.475	177.194
2	33	Kyle Busch (i)	Richard Childress Racing	Chevrolet	30.598	176.482
3	81	Chandler Smith	Joe Gibbs Racing	Toyota	30.639	176.246
4	2	Jesse Love (R)	Richard Childress Racing	Chevrolet	30.704	175.873
5	27	Jeb Burton	Jordan Anderson Racing	Chevrolet	30.770	175.496
6	00	Cole Custer	Stewart–Haas Racing	Ford	30.781	175.433
7	18	Sheldon Creed	Joe Gibbs Racing	Toyota	30.781	175.433
8	21	Austin Hill	Richard Childress Racing	Chevrolet	30.793	175.365
9	7	Justin Allgaier	JR Motorsports	Chevrolet	30.829	175.160
10	9	Brandon Jones	JR Motorsports	Chevrolet	30.839	175.103
11	16	A. J. Allmendinger	Kaulig Racing	Chevrolet	31.015	174.109
12	31	Parker Retzlaff	Jordan Anderson Racing	Chevrolet	31.016	174.104
13	1	Sam Mayer	JR Motorsports	Chevrolet	31.029	174.031
14	38	Matt DiBenedetto	RSS Racing	Ford	31.095	173.661
15	19	Taylor Gray (i)	Joe Gibbs Racing	Toyota	31.108	173.589
16	8	Sammy Smith	JR Motorsports	Chevrolet	31.119	173.527
17	5	Anthony Alfredo	Our Motorsports	Chevrolet	31.183	173.171
18	30	Noah Gragson (i)	Rette Jones Racing	Ford	31.188	173.144
19	98	Riley Herbst	Stewart–Haas Racing	Ford	31.278	172.645
20	6	Garrett Smithley	JD Motorsports	Chevrolet	31.291	172.574
21	39	Ryan Sieg	RSS Racing	Ford	31.326	172.381
22	43	Ryan Ellis	Alpha Prime Racing	Chevrolet	31.337	172.320
23	44	Brennan Poole	Alpha Prime Racing	Chevrolet	31.371	172.133
24	51	Jeremy Clements	Jeremy Clements Racing	Chevrolet	31.497	171.445
25	42	Leland Honeyman (R)	Young's Motorsports	Chevrolet	31.627	170.740
26	26	Dean Thompson (i)	Sam Hunt Racing	Toyota	31.650	170.616
27	91	Kyle Weatherman	DGM Racing	Chevrolet	31.696	170.369
28	48	Parker Kligerman	Big Machine Racing	Chevrolet	31.764	170.004
29	97	Shane van Gisbergen (R)	Kaulig Racing	Chevrolet	31.782	169.907
30	17	Chase Elliott (i)	Hendrick Motorsports	Chevrolet	31.794	169.843
31	29	Blaine Perkins	RSS Racing	Ford	31.796	169.833
32	15	Hailie Deegan (R)	AM Racing	Ford	31.850	169.545
33	4	Dawson Cram (R)	JD Motorsports	Chevrolet	31.877	169.401
Qualified by owner's points
34	28	Kyle Sieg	RSS Racing	Ford	31.955	168.988
35	07	Patrick Emerling	SS-Green Light Racing	Chevrolet	32.052	168.476
36	11	Josh Williams	Kaulig Racing	Chevrolet	32.122	168.109
37	92	Natalie Decker	DGM Racing	Chevrolet	32.518	166.062
38	14	J. J. Yeley	SS-Green Light Racing	Chevrolet	–	–
Failed to qualify
39	74	Jade Buford	Mike Harmon Racing	Chevrolet	32.964	163.815
40	35	Akinori Ogata	Joey Gase Motorsports	Chevrolet	–	–
Official qualifying results
Official starting lineup

== Race results ==
Stage 1 Laps: 45

Pos.	#	Driver	Team	Make	Pts
1	7	Justin Allgaier	JR Motorsports	Chevrolet	10
2	20	Ty Gibbs (i)	Joe Gibbs Racing	Toyota	0
3	33	Kyle Busch (i)	Richard Childress Racing	Chevrolet	0
4	9	Brandon Jones	JR Motorsports	Chevrolet	7
5	16	A. J. Allmendinger	Kaulig Racing	Chevrolet	6
6	8	Sammy Smith	JR Motorsports	Chevrolet	5
7	21	Austin Hill	Richard Childress Racing	Chevrolet	4
8	81	Chandler Smith	Joe Gibbs Racing	Toyota	3
9	39	Ryan Sieg	RSS Racing	Ford	2
10	00	Cole Custer	Stewart-Haas Racing	Ford	1

Stage 2 Laps: 45

Pos.	#	Driver	Team	Make	Pts
1	7	Justin Allgaier	JR Motorsports	Chevrolet	10
2	33	Kyle Busch (i)	Richard Childress Racing	Chevrolet	0
3	21	Austin Hill	Richard Childress Racing	Chevrolet	8
4	1	Sam Mayer	JR Motorsports	Chevrolet	7
5	18	Sheldon Creed	Joe Gibbs Racing	Toyota	6
6	20	Ty Gibbs (i)	Joe Gibbs Racing	Toyota	0
7	39	Ryan Sieg	RSS Racing	Ford	4
8	81	Chandler Smith	Joe Gibbs Racing	Toyota	3
9	2	Jesse Love (R)	Richard Childress Racing	Chevrolet	2
10	30	Noah Gragson (i)	Rette Jones Racing	Ford	0

Stage 3 Laps: 110

Fin	St	#	Driver	Team	Make	Laps	Led	Status	Pts
1	30	17	Chase Elliott (i)	Hendrick Motorsports	Chevrolet	200	18	Running	0
2	10	9	Brandon Jones	JR Motorsports	Chevrolet	200	0	Running	42
3	16	8	Sammy Smith	JR Motorsports	Chevrolet	200	0	Running	39
4	13	1	Sam Mayer	JR Motorsports	Chevrolet	200	44	Running	40
5	11	16	A. J. Allmendinger	Kaulig Racing	Chevrolet	200	0	Running	38
6	2	33	Kyle Busch (i)	Richard Childress Racing	Chevrolet	200	34	Running	0
7	21	39	Ryan Sieg	RSS Racing	Ford	200	0	Running	36
8	36	11	Josh Williams	Kaulig Racing	Chevrolet	200	0	Running	29
9	1	20	Ty Gibbs (i)	Joe Gibbs Racing	Toyota	200	27	Running	0
10	18	30	Noah Gragson (i)	Rette Jones Racing	Ford	200	9	Running	0
11	27	91	Kyle Weatherman	DGM Racing	Chevrolet	200	0	Running	26
12	15	19	Taylor Gray (i)	Joe Gibbs Racing	Toyota	200	0	Running	0
13	24	51	Jeremy Clements	Jeremy Clements Racing	Chevrolet	200	0	Running	24
14	12	31	Parker Retzlaff	Jordan Anderson Racing	Chevrolet	200	0	Running	23
15	29	97	Shane van Gisbergen (R)	Kaulig Racing	Chevrolet	200	0	Running	22
16	17	5	Anthony Alfredo	Our Motorsports	Chevrolet	200	0	Running	21
17	5	27	Jeb Bruton	Jordan Anderson Racing	Chevrolet	200	0	Running	20
18	3	81	Chandler Smith	Joe Gibbs Racing	Toyota	200	0	Running	25
19	34	28	Kyle Sieg	RSS Racing	Ford	199	5	Running	18
20	32	15	Hailie Deegan (R)	AM Racing	Ford	199	0	Running	17
21	38	14	J. J. Yeley	SS-Green Light Racing	Chevrolet	199	0	Running	16
22	33	4	Dawson Cram (R)	JD Motorsports	Chevrolet	199	0	Running	15
23	25	42	Leland Honeyman (R)	Young's Motorsports	Chevrolet	199	0	Running	14
24	20	6	Garrett Smithley	JD Motorsports	Chevrolet	199	0	Running	13
25	8	21	Austin Hill	Richard Childress Racing	Chevrolet	198	0	Running	24
26	14	38	Matt DiBenedetto	RSS Racing	Ford	198	0	Running	11
27	22	43	Ryan Ellis	Alpha Prime Racing	Chevrolet	198	0	Running	10
28	4	2	Jesse Love (R)	Richard Childress Racing	Chevrolet	198	14	Running	11
29	37	92	Natalie Decker	DGM Racing	Chevrolet	196	0	Running	8
30	35	07	Patrick Emerling	SS-Green Light Racing	Chevrolet	191	0	Running	7
31	23	44	Brennan Poole	Alpha Prime Racing	Chevrolet	190	0	Running	6
32	6	00	Cole Custer	Stewart–Haas Racing	Ford	184	0	Accident	6
33	9	7	Justin Allgaier	JR Motorsports	Chevrolet	176	40	Accident	24
34	26	26	Dean Thompson (i)	Sam Hunt Racing	Toyota	137	0	Fuel Pump	0
35	31	29	Blaine Perkins	RSS Racing	Ford	135	0	Suspension	2
36	7	18	Sheldon Creed	Joe Gibbs Racing	Toyota	119	9	Oil Coller	7
37	28	48	Parker Kligerman	Big Machine Racing	Chevrolet	71	0	Accident	1
38	19	98	Riley Herbst	Stewart–Haas Racing	Ford	29	0	Accident	1
Official race results

== Standings after the race ==
Drivers' Championship standings

	Pos	Driver	Points
	1	Austin Hill	454
1	2	Chandler Smith	450 (-4)
1	3	Cole Custer	433 (–21)
1	4	Justin Allgaier	397 (–57)
1	5	Jesse Love	384 (–70)
1	6	A. J. Allmendinger	347 (–107)
1	7	Riley Herbst	338 (–116)
	8	Sheldon Creed	313 (–141)
	9	Parker Kligerman	307 (–147)
2	10	Brandon Jones	304 (–150)
	11	Sam Mayer	294 (–160)
2	12	Anthony Alfredo	291 (–163)
Official driver's standings

Manufacturers' Championship standings

Pos	Manufacturer	Points
1	Chevrolet	410
2	Toyota	397 (-15)
3	Ford	345 (–54)

- Note: Only the first 12 positions are included for the driver standings.

Previous race: 2024 Crown Royal Purple Bag Project 200	NASCAR Xfinity Series; 2024 season	Next race: 2024 Pacific Office Automation 147
