= 2025 Baptist Health 200 =

4th race of the 2025 NASCAR Craftsman Truck Series

Race details
- Race 4 of 25 of the 2025 NASCAR Craftsman Truck Series
- Date: March 21, 2025
- Location: Homestead–Miami Speedway in Homestead, Florida
- Course: Permanent racing facility
- Course length: 1.5 miles (2.4 km)
- Distance: 134 laps, 201 mi (323 km)
- Scheduled distance: 134 laps, 201 mi (323 km)
- Average speed: 117.068 mph (188.403 km/h)

Pole position
Driver	Corey Heim	Tricon Garage
- Time: 32.111

Most laps led
Driver	Corey Heim	Tricon Garage
- Laps: 78

Winner
No. 07	Kyle Larson	Spire Motorsports

Television in the United States
- Network: FS1
- Announcers: Kevin Harvick, Joey Logano, and Brad Keselowski

Radio in the United States
- Radio: NRN

The 2025 Baptist Health 200 was the 4th stock car race of the 2025 NASCAR Craftsman Truck Series, and the 29th iteration of the event. The race was held on Friday, March 21, 2025, at Homestead–Miami Speedway in Homestead, Florida, a 1.5 miles (2.4 km) permanent oval shaped racetrack. The race took the scheduled 134 laps to complete.

In an action-packed race, Kyle Larson, driving for Spire Motorsports, would make a remarkable comeback, spinning out in the late stages and gaining 22 positions in the final 38 laps to earn his fourth career NASCAR Craftsman Truck Series win, and his first of the season. Corey Heim started on the pole and dominated the majority of the race, winning both stages and leading a race-high 78 laps, before being plagued by power issues late in the event, finishing 3rd. To fill out the podium, Layne Riggs, driving for Front Row Motorsports, would finish in 2nd, respectively.

== Report ==
=== Background ===
Homestead–Miami Speedway, the track where the race was held.

Homestead–Miami Speedway is a motor racing track located in Homestead, Florida. The track, which has several configurations, has promoted several series of racing, including NASCAR, the NTT IndyCar Series and the Grand-Am Rolex Sports Car Series.

From 2002 to 2019, Homestead-Miami Speedway has hosted the final race of the season in all three of NASCAR's series: the NASCAR Cup Series, Xfinity Series and Craftsman Truck Series. The track has since held races on different dates in 2020 (June) and 2021 (February), which were both effected by the COVID-19 pandemic, before being moved back into the Playoffs as the final race of the Round of 8 in 2022, with the date being kept for 2023.

==== Entry list ====
- (R) denotes rookie driver.
- (i) denotes driver who is ineligible for series driver points.

#	Driver	Team	Make
1	Brandon Jones (i)	Tricon Garage	Toyota
02	Nathan Byrd	Young's Motorsports	Chevrolet
2	Stephen Mallozzi	Reaume Brothers Racing	Ford
5	Toni Breidinger (R)	Tricon Garage	Toyota
07	Kyle Larson (i)	Spire Motorsports	Chevrolet
7	Corey Day (i)	Spire Motorsports	Chevrolet
9	Grant Enfinger	CR7 Motorsports	Chevrolet
11	Corey Heim	Tricon Garage	Toyota
13	Jake Garcia	ThorSport Racing	Ford
15	Tanner Gray	Tricon Garage	Toyota
17	Gio Ruggiero (R)	Tricon Garage	Toyota
18	Tyler Ankrum	McAnally-Hilgemann Racing	Chevrolet
19	Daniel Hemric	McAnally-Hilgemann Racing	Chevrolet
20	Stefan Parsons	Young's Motorsports	Chevrolet
22	Keith McGee	Reaume Brothers Racing	Ford
26	Dawson Sutton (R)	Rackley W.A.R.	Chevrolet
33	Frankie Muniz (R)	Reaume Brothers Racing	Ford
34	Layne Riggs	Front Row Motorsports	Ford
38	Chandler Smith	Front Row Motorsports	Ford
42	Matt Mills	Niece Motorsports	Chevrolet
44	Ross Chastain (i)	Niece Motorsports	Chevrolet
45	Kaden Honeycutt	Niece Motorsports	Chevrolet
52	Stewart Friesen	Halmar Friesen Racing	Toyota
63	Akinori Ogata	Akinori Performance	Toyota
66	Luke Fenhaus	ThorSport Racing	Ford
67	Michel Disdier	Freedom Racing Enterprises	Chevrolet
71	Rajah Caruth	Spire Motorsports	Chevrolet
76	Spencer Boyd	Freedom Racing Enterprises	Chevrolet
77	Andrés Pérez de Lara (R)	Spire Motorsports	Chevrolet
81	Connor Mosack (R)	McAnally-Hilgemann Racing	Chevrolet
88	Matt Crafton	ThorSport Racing	Ford
91	Jack Wood	McAnally-Hilgemann Racing	Chevrolet
98	Ty Majeski	ThorSport Racing	Ford
99	Ben Rhodes	ThorSport Racing	Ford
Official entry list

== Practice ==
For practice, drivers will be separated into two different groups, A and B. Both sessions were 25 minutes long, and was held on Friday, March 21, at 3:35 PM EST. Jack Wood, driving for McAnally-Hilgemann Racing, would set the fastest time between both sessions, with a lap of 32.775, and a speed of 164.760 mph (265.156 km/h).

Pos.	#	Driver	Team	Make	Time	Speed
1	91	Jack Wood	McAnally-Hilgemann Racing	Chevrolet	32.775	164.760
2	1	Brandon Jones (i)	Tricon Garage	Toyota	32.919	164.039
3	44	Ross Chastain (i)	Niece Motorsports	Chevrolet	32.984	163.716
Full practice results

== Qualifying ==
Qualifying was held on Friday, March 21, at 4:40 PM EST. Since Homestead–Miami Speedway is an intermediate racetrack, the qualifying procedure used is a single-car, one-lap system with one round. Drivers will be on track by themselves and will have one lap to post a qualifying time, and whoever sets the fastest time will win the pole.

Corey Heim, driving for Tricon Garage, would score the pole for the race, with a lap of 32.111, and a speed of 168.167 mph (270.639 km/h).

No drivers would fail to qualify.

=== Qualifying results ===
Pos.	#	Driver	Team	Make	Time	Speed
1	11	Corey Heim	Tricon Garage	Toyota	32.111	168.167
2	15	Tanner Gray	Tricon Garage	Toyota	32.281	167.281
3	07	Kyle Larson (i)	Spire Motorsports	Chevrolet	32.334	167.007
4	34	Layne Riggs	Front Row Motorsports	Ford	32.355	166.898
5	17	Gio Ruggiero (R)	Tricon Garage	Toyota	32.411	166.610
6	18	Tyler Ankrum	McAnally-Hilgemann Racing	Chevrolet	32.471	166.302
7	44	Ross Chastain (i)	Niece Motorsports	Chevrolet	32.496	166.174
8	9	Grant Enfinger	CR7 Motorsports	Chevrolet	32.511	166.098
9	52	Stewart Friesen	Halmar Friesen Racing	Toyota	32.562	165.837
10	98	Ty Majeski	ThorSport Racing	Ford	32.593	165.680
11	1	Brandon Jones (i)	Tricon Garage	Toyota	32.627	165.507
12	71	Rajah Caruth	Spire Motorsports	Chevrolet	32.656	165.360
13	45	Kaden Honeycutt	Niece Motorsports	Chevrolet	32.714	165.067
14	19	Daniel Hemric	McAnally-Hilgemann Racing	Chevrolet	32.715	165.062
15	38	Chandler Smith	Front Row Motorsports	Ford	32.717	165.052
16	7	Corey Day (i)	Spire Motorsports	Chevrolet	32.834	164.464
17	42	Matt Mills	Niece Motorsports	Chevrolet	32.882	164.224
18	26	Dawson Sutton (R)	Rackley W.A.R.	Chevrolet	32.930	163.984
19	81	Connor Mosack (R)	McAnally-Hilgemann Racing	Chevrolet	32.952	163.875
20	13	Jake Garcia	ThorSport Racing	Ford	33.125	163.019
21	77	Andrés Pérez de Lara (R)	Spire Motorsports	Chevrolet	33.157	162.862
22	20	Stefan Parsons	Young's Motorsports	Chevrolet	33.233	162.489
23	88	Matt Crafton	ThorSport Racing	Ford	33.333	162.002
24	99	Ben Rhodes	ThorSport Racing	Ford	33.407	161.643
25	66	Luke Fenhaus	ThorSport Racing	Ford	33.545	160.978
26	91	Jack Wood	McAnally-Hilgemann Racing	Chevrolet	33.574	160.839
27	5	Toni Breidinger (R)	Tricon Garage	Toyota	33.758	159.962
28	02	Nathan Byrd	Young's Motorsports	Chevrolet	33.962	159.001
29	33	Frankie Muniz (R)	Reaume Brothers Racing	Ford	34.204	157.876
30	22	Keith McGee	Reaume Brothers Racing	Ford	34.401	156.972
31	63	Akinori Ogata	Akinori Performance	Toyota	34.436	156.813
Qualified by owner's points
32	76	Spencer Boyd	Freedom Racing Enterprises	Chevrolet	34.489	156.572
33	2	Stephen Mallozzi	Reaume Brothers Racing	Ford	36.260	148.924
34	67	Michel Disdier	Freedom Racing Enterprises	Chevrolet	36.915	146.282
Official qualifying results
Official starting lineup

== Race results ==
Stage 1 Laps: 30

Pos.	#	Driver	Team	Make	Pts
1	11	Corey Heim	Tricon Garage	Toyota	10
2	07	Kyle Larson (i)	Spire Motorsports	Chevrolet	0
3	34	Layne Riggs	Front Row Motorsports	Ford	8
4	98	Ty Majeski	ThorSport Racing	Ford	7
5	44	Ross Chastain (i)	Niece Motorsports	Chevrolet	0
6	18	Tyler Ankrum	McAnally-Hilgemann Racing	Chevrolet	5
7	19	Daniel Hemric	McAnally-Hilgemann Racing	Chevrolet	4
8	52	Stewart Friesen	Halmar Friesen Racing	Toyota	3
9	45	Kaden Honeycutt	Niece Motorsports	Chevrolet	2
10	38	Chandler Smith	Front Row Motorsports	Ford	1

Stage 2 Laps: 30

Pos.	#	Driver	Team	Make	Pts
1	11	Corey Heim	Tricon Garage	Toyota	10
2	07	Kyle Larson (i)	Spire Motorsports	Chevrolet	0
3	98	Ty Majeski	ThorSport Racing	Ford	8
4	52	Stewart Friesen	Halmar Friesen Racing	Toyota	7
5	45	Kaden Honeycutt	Niece Motorsports	Chevrolet	6
6	34	Layne Riggs	Front Row Motorsports	Ford	5
7	44	Ross Chastain (i)	Niece Motorsports	Chevrolet	0
8	19	Daniel Hemric	McAnally-Hilgemann Racing	Chevrolet	3
9	18	Tyler Ankrum	McAnally-Hilgemann Racing	Chevrolet	2
10	9	Grant Enfinger	CR7 Motorsports	Chevrolet	1

Stage 3 Laps: 84

Fin	St	#	Driver	Team	Make	Laps	Led	Status	Pts
1	3	07	Kyle Larson (i)	Spire Motorsports	Chevrolet	134	20	Running	0
2	4	34	Layne Riggs	Front Row Motorsports	Ford	134	3	Running	48
3	1	11	Corey Heim	Tricon Garage	Toyota	134	78	Running	54
4	6	18	Tyler Ankrum	McAnally-Hilgemann Racing	Chevrolet	134	0	Running	40
5	14	19	Daniel Hemric	McAnally-Hilgemann Racing	Chevrolet	134	0	Running	39
6	7	44	Ross Chastain (i)	Niece Motorsports	Chevrolet	134	33	Running	0
7	20	13	Jake Garcia	ThorSport Racing	Ford	134	0	Running	30
8	15	38	Chandler Smith	Front Row Motorsports	Ford	134	0	Running	30
9	8	9	Grant Enfinger	CR7 Motorsports	Chevrolet	134	0	Running	29
10	13	45	Kaden Honeycutt	Niece Motorsports	Chevrolet	134	0	Running	35
11	10	98	Ty Majeski	ThorSport Racing	Ford	134	0	Running	41
12	11	1	Brandon Jones (i)	Tricon Garage	Toyota	134	0	Running	0
13	23	88	Matt Crafton	ThorSport Racing	Ford	134	0	Running	24
14	17	42	Matt Mills	Niece Motorsports	Chevrolet	134	0	Running	23
15	16	7	Corey Day (i)	Spire Motorsports	Chevrolet	134	0	Running	0
16	9	52	Stewart Friesen	Halmar Friesen Racing	Toyota	134	0	Running	31
17	2	15	Tanner Gray	Tricon Garage	Toyota	134	0	Running	20
18	22	20	Stefan Parsons	Young's Motorsports	Chevrolet	134	0	Running	19
19	19	81	Connor Mosack (R)	McAnally-Hilgemann Racing	Chevrolet	134	0	Running	18
20	25	66	Luke Fenhaus	ThorSport Racing	Ford	134	0	Running	17
21	26	91	Jack Wood	McAnally-Hilgemann Racing	Chevrolet	134	0	Running	16
22	12	71	Rajah Caruth	Spire Motorsports	Chevrolet	134	0	Running	15
23	18	26	Dawson Sutton (R)	Rackley W.A.R.	Chevrolet	134	0	Running	14
24	29	33	Frankie Muniz (R)	Reaume Brothers Racing	Ford	134	0	Running	13
25	21	77	Andrés Pérez de Lara (R)	Spire Motorsports	Chevrolet	134	0	Running	12
26	27	5	Toni Breidinger (R)	Tricon Garage	Toyota	133	0	Running	11
27	28	02	Nathan Byrd	Young's Motorsports	Chevrolet	133	0	Running	10
28	32	76	Spencer Boyd	Freedom Racing Enterprises	Chevrolet	133	0	Running	9
29	5	17	Gio Ruggiero (R)	Tricon Garage	Toyota	131	0	Running	8
30	30	22	Keith McGee	Reaume Brothers Racing	Ford	130	0	Running	7
31	34	67	Michel Disdier	Freedom Racing Enterprises	Chevrolet	128	0	Running	6
32	31	63	Akinori Ogata	Akinori Performance	Toyota	124	0	Running	5
33	24	99	Ben Rhodes	ThorSport Racing	Ford	83	0	Suspension	4
34	33	2	Stephen Mallozzi	Reaume Brothers Racing	Ford	15	0	Vibration	3
Official race results

== Standings after the race ==
Drivers' Championship standings

	Pos	Driver	Points
1	1	Corey Heim	177
1	2	Ty Majeski	169 (-8)
1	3	Chandler Smith	150 (–27)
1	4	Grant Enfinger	149 (–28)
	5	Stewart Friesen	138 (–39)
1	6	Tyler Ankrum	127 (–50)
2	7	Daniel Hemric	125 (–52)
3	8	Layne Riggs	122 (–55)
3	9	Jake Garcia	103 (–74)
4	10	Kaden Honeycutt	101 (–76)
Official driver's standings

Manufacturers' Championship standings

Pos	Manufacturer	Points
1	Toyota	149
2	Chevrolet	148 (-1)
3	Ford	134 (–15)

- Note: Only the first 10 positions are included for the driver standings.

Previous race: 2025 Ecosave 200	NASCAR Craftsman Truck Series; 2025 season	Next race: 2025 Boys & Girls Club of the Blue Ridge 200
