= 2021 Go Bowling 250 =

Race details
- Race 25 of 33 of the 2021 NASCAR Xfinity Series
- Date: September 11, 2021
- Official name: Go Bowling 250
- Location: Richmond, Virginia, Richmond Raceway
- Course: Permanent racing facility
- Course length: 0.75 miles (1.21 km)
- Distance: 250 laps, 187.5 mi (301.752 km)
- Scheduled distance: 250 laps, 187.5 mi (301.752 km)
- Average speed: 83.364 miles per hour (134.161 km/h)

Pole position
Driver	Austin Cindric	Team Penske
- Grid positions set by competition-based formula

Most laps led
Driver	Ty Gibbs	Joe Gibbs Racing
- Laps: 67

Winner
No. 9	Noah Gragson	JR Motorsports

Television in the United States
- Network: NBCSN
- Announcers: Rick Allen, Steve Letarte, Jeff Burton, Dale Jarrett

Radio in the United States
- Radio: Motor Racing Network

The 2021 Go Bowling 250 was the 25th stock car race of the 2021 NASCAR Xfinity Series season, and the 40th iteration of the event. The race was held on Saturday, September 11, 2021 in Richmond, Virginia at Richmond Raceway, a 0.75 miles (1.21 km) D-shaped oval. The race took 250 laps to complete. For the second straight race, Noah Gragson of JR Motorsports would be able to hold off the field on a late race restart to win the race. To fill out the podium, Justin Haley of Kaulig Racing and John Hunter Nemechek of Sam Hunt Racing would finish 2nd and 3rd, respectively.

Dale Earnhardt Jr. would return to racing as a one-off for the NASCAR Xfinity Series.

== Background ==
The layout of Richmond Raceway, the venue where the race was held.

Richmond Raceway (RR), formerly known as Richmond International Raceway (RIR), is a 3/4-mile (1.2 km), D-shaped, asphalt race track located just outside Richmond, Virginia in Henrico County. It hosts the NASCAR Cup Series, the NASCAR Xfinity Series, NASCAR Camping World Truck Series and the IndyCar series. Known as "America's premier short track", it formerly hosted two USAC sprint car races.

=== Entry list ===
#	Driver	Team	Make	Sponsor
0	Jeffrey Earnhardt	JD Motorsports	Chevrolet	ForeverLawn Premium Synthetic Grass, 9/11 Memorial Walk "We Will Never Forget."
1	Michael Annett	JR Motorsports	Chevrolet	Pilot Flying J "If You've Got It A Trucker Brought It"
2	Myatt Snider	Richard Childress Racing	Chevrolet	Superior Essex
02	Brett Moffitt*	Our Motorsports	Chevrolet	Fr8Auctions Patriotic
4	Landon Cassill	JD Motorsports	Chevrolet	Voyager
5	Matt Mills	B. J. McLeod Motorsports	Chevrolet	J. F. Electric
6	Ryan Vargas	JD Motorsports	Chevrolet	Rich Mar Florist
7	Justin Allgaier	JR Motorsports	Chevrolet	Brandt Professional Agriculture
07	Joe Graf Jr.	SS-Green Light Racing	Chevrolet	Bucked Up Energy
8	Dale Earnhardt Jr.	JR Motorsports	Chevrolet	Unilever United For America
9	Noah Gragson	JR Motorsports	Chevrolet	Bass Pro Shops, Black Rifle Coffee Company
10	Jeb Burton	Kaulig Racing	Chevrolet	State Water Heaters
11	Justin Haley	Kaulig Racing	Chevrolet	LeafFilter Gutter Protection
13	Timmy Hill	MBM Motorsports	Toyota	
15	Colby Howard**	JD Motorsports	Chevrolet	JD Motorsports
16	A. J. Allmendinger	Kaulig Racing	Chevrolet	Hyperice
17	J. J. Yeley	SS-Green Light Racing with Rick Ware Racing	Chevrolet	Thundercat Technology
18	Daniel Hemric	Joe Gibbs Racing	Toyota	Poppy Bank
19	Brandon Jones	Joe Gibbs Racing	Toyota	Menards, Atlas Designer Shingles
20	Harrison Burton	Joe Gibbs Racing	Toyota	DEX Imaging
22	Austin Cindric	Team Penske	Ford	Carshop
23	Patrick Emerling	Our Motorsports	Chevrolet	Spirit Snorkeling, Captain Pip's Marina & Hideaway
26	John Hunter Nemechek	Sam Hunt Racing	Toyota	Safeway
31	Josh Berry	Jordan Anderson Racing	Chevrolet	Bommarito Automotive Group, Solid Rock Carriers
36	Alex Labbé	DGM Racing	Chevrolet	Prolon Controls
39	Ryan Sieg	RSS Racing	Ford	CMR Construction & Roofing
44	Tommy Joe Martins	Martins Motorsports	Chevrolet	Alpha Prime Regimen
47	Kyle Weatherman	Mike Harmon Racing	Chevrolet	Big Frig, 12 Hour Auctions
48	Jade Buford	Big Machine Racing Team	Chevrolet	Big Machine Vodka Spiked Cooler
51	Jeremy Clements	Jeremy Clements Racing	Chevrolet	1 Stop Convenience Store
52	Akinori Ogata	Jimmy Means Racing	Chevrolet	Kyowa Precision
54	Ty Gibbs	Joe Gibbs Racing	Toyota	Monster Energy
61	Stephen Leicht	Hattori Racing Enterprises	Toyota	Jani-King
66	David Starr	MBM Motorsports	Toyota	Sharelife Vacations, Helluva Ranch
68	Brandon Brown	Brandonbilt Motorsports	Chevrolet	Trade The Chain
74	C. J. McLaughlin	Mike Harmon Racing	Chevrolet	Sci Aps
78	Mason Massey	B. J. McLeod Motorsports	Chevrolet	Gerber Collision & Glass
90	Spencer Boyd	DGM Racing	Chevrolet	Mini Doge
92	Josh Williams	DGM Racing	Chevrolet	Workpro Tools
98	Riley Herbst	Stewart-Haas Racing	Ford	Go Bowling
99	Sam Mayer	B. J. McLeod Motorsports	Chevrolet	QPS Employment Group
Official entry list

*Driver would change to Ty Dillon due to Moffitt not feeling well.

**Driver changed to Bayley Currey.

== Starting lineup ==
Qualifying was determined by a qualifying metric system based on the previous race, the 2021 Sport Clips Haircuts VFW 200. As a result, Austin Cindric of Team Penske would win the pole.

Pos.	#	Driver	Team	Make
1	22	Austin Cindric	Team Penske	Ford
2	20	Harrison Burton	Joe Gibbs Racing	Toyota
3	9	Noah Gragson	JR Motorsports	Chevrolet
4	11	Justin Haley	Kaulig Racing	Chevrolet
5	7	Justin Allgaier	JR Motorsports	Chevrolet
6	10	Jeb Burton	Kaulig Racing	Chevrolet
7	51	Jeremy Clements	Jeremy Clements Racing	Chevrolet
8	16	A. J. Allmendinger	Kaulig Racing	Chevrolet
9	2	Myatt Snider	Richard Childress Racing	Chevrolet
10	1	Michael Annett	JR Motorsports	Chevrolet
11	39	Ryan Sieg	RSS Racing	Ford
12	18	Daniel Hemric	Joe Gibbs Racing	Toyota
13	36	Alex Labbé	DGM Racing	Chevrolet
14	92	Josh Williams	DGM Racing	Chevrolet
15	54	Ty Gibbs	Joe Gibbs Racing	Toyota
16	19	Brandon Jones	Joe Gibbs Racing	Toyota
17	68	Brandon Brown	Brandonbilt Motorsports	Chevrolet
18	48	Jade Buford	Big Machine Racing Team	Chevrolet
19	02	Ty Dillon	Our Motorsports	Chevrolet
20	98	Riley Herbst	Stewart-Haas Racing	Ford
21	5	Matt Mills	B. J. McLeod Motorsports	Chevrolet
22	23	Patrick Emerling	Our Motorsports	Chevrolet
23	07	Joe Graf Jr.	SS-Green Light Racing	Chevrolet
24	44	Tommy Joe Martins	Martins Motorsports	Chevrolet
25	6	Ryan Vargas	JD Motorsports	Chevrolet
26	0	Jeffrey Earnhardt	JD Motorsports	Chevrolet
27	26	John Hunter Nemechek	Sam Hunt Racing	Toyota
28	15	Bayley Currey	JD Motorsports	Chevrolet
29	17	J. J. Yeley	SS-Green Light Racing with Rick Ware Racing	Chevrolet
30	8	Dale Earnhardt Jr.	JR Motorsports	Chevrolet
31	4	Landon Cassill	JD Motorsports	Chevrolet
32	47	Kyle Weatherman	Mike Harmon Racing	Chevrolet
33	31	Josh Berry	Jordan Anderson Racing	Chevrolet
34	78	Mason Massey	B. J. McLeod Motorsports	Chevrolet
35	90	Spencer Boyd	DGM Racing	Chevrolet
36	61	Stephen Leicht	Hattori Racing Enterprises	Toyota
37	66	David Starr	MBM Motorsports	Toyota
38	99	Sam Mayer	B. J. McLeod Motorsports	Chevrolet
39	74	C. J. McLaughlin	Mike Harmon Racing	Chevrolet
40	52	Akinori Ogata	Jimmy Means Racing	Chevrolet
Failed to qualify
41	13	Timmy Hill	MBM Motorsports	Toyota
Official starting lineup

== Race results ==
Stage 1 Laps: 75

Fin	#	Driver	Team	Make	Pts
1	16	A. J. Allmendinger	Kaulig Racing	Chevrolet	10
2	44	Tommy Joe Martins	Martins Motorsports	Chevrolet	9
3	22	Austin Cindric	Team Penske	Ford	8
4	54	Ty Gibbs	Joe Gibbs Racing	Toyota	7
5	17	J. J. Yeley	SS-Green Light Racing with Rick Ware Racing	Chevrolet	6
6	20	Harrison Burton	Joe Gibbs Racing	Toyota	5
7	18	Daniel Hemric	Joe Gibbs Racing	Toyota	4
8	9	Noah Gragson	JR Motorsports	Chevrolet	3
9	90	Spencer Boyd	DGM Racing	Chevrolet	0
10	23	Patrick Emerling	Our Motorsports	Chevrolet	1

Stage 2 Laps: 75

Fin	#	Driver	Team	Make	Pts
1	54	Ty Gibbs	Joe Gibbs Racing	Toyota	10
2	16	A. J. Allmendinger	Kaulig Racing	Chevrolet	9
3	20	Harrison Burton	Joe Gibbs Racing	Toyota	8
4	9	Noah Gragson	JR Motorsports	Chevrolet	7
5	18	Daniel Hemric	Joe Gibbs Racing	Toyota	6
6	22	Austin Cindric	Team Penske	Ford	5
7	99	Sam Mayer	B. J. McLeod Motorsports	Chevrolet	4
8	98	Riley Herbst	Stewart-Haas Racing	Ford	3
9	39	Ryan Sieg	RSS Racing	Ford	2
10	26	John Hunter Nemechek	Sam Hunt Racing	Toyota	0

Stage 3 Laps: 100

Fin	St	#	Driver	Team	Make	Laps	Led	Status	Pts
1	3	9	Noah Gragson	JR Motorsports	Chevrolet	250	22	running	50
2	4	11	Justin Haley	Kaulig Racing	Chevrolet	250	0	running	35
3	27	26	John Hunter Nemechek	Sam Hunt Racing	Toyota	250	0	running	0
4	5	7	Justin Allgaier	JR Motorsports	Chevrolet	250	0	running	33
5	20	98	Riley Herbst	Stewart-Haas Racing	Ford	250	0	running	35
6	12	18	Daniel Hemric	Joe Gibbs Racing	Toyota	250	17	running	41
7	15	54	Ty Gibbs	Joe Gibbs Racing	Toyota	250	67	running	47
8	17	68	Brandon Brown	Brandonbilt Motorsports	Chevrolet	250	0	running	29
9	2	20	Harrison Burton	Joe Gibbs Racing	Toyota	250	43	running	41
10	6	10	Jeb Burton	Kaulig Racing	Chevrolet	250	0	running	27
11	19	02	Ty Dillon	Our Motorsports	Chevrolet	250	0	running	26
12	38	99	Sam Mayer	B. J. McLeod Motorsports	Chevrolet	250	7	running	29
13	11	39	Ryan Sieg	RSS Racing	Ford	250	0	running	26
14	30	8	Dale Earnhardt Jr.	JR Motorsports	Chevrolet	250	0	running	23
15	32	47	Kyle Weatherman	Mike Harmon Racing	Chevrolet	250	0	running	22
16	1	22	Austin Cindric	Team Penske	Ford	250	50	running	34
17	34	78	Mason Massey	B. J. McLeod Motorsports	Chevrolet	250	0	running	20
18	8	16	A. J. Allmendinger	Kaulig Racing	Chevrolet	250	39	running	38
19	13	36	Alex Labbé	DGM Racing	Chevrolet	250	0	running	18
20	16	19	Brandon Jones	Joe Gibbs Racing	Toyota	250	0	running	17
21	21	5	Matt Mills	B. J. McLeod Motorsports	Chevrolet	250	0	running	16
22	10	1	Michael Annett	JR Motorsports	Chevrolet	250	0	running	15
23	14	92	Josh Williams	DGM Racing	Chevrolet	250	0	running	14
24	33	31	Josh Berry	Jordan Anderson Racing	Chevrolet	250	0	running	13
25	9	2	Myatt Snider	Richard Childress Racing	Chevrolet	250	0	running	12
26	7	51	Jeremy Clements	Jeremy Clements Racing	Chevrolet	250	0	running	11
27	28	15	Bayley Currey	JD Motorsports	Chevrolet	250	0	running	0
28	37	66	David Starr	MBM Motorsports	Toyota	249	0	running	9
29	29	17	J. J. Yeley	SS-Green Light Racing with Rick Ware Racing	Chevrolet	248	0	running	14
30	26	0	Jeffrey Earnhardt	JD Motorsports	Chevrolet	248	0	running	7
31	23	07	Joe Graf Jr.	SS-Green Light Racing	Chevrolet	248	0	running	6
32	22	23	Patrick Emerling	Our Motorsports	Chevrolet	248	0	running	6
33	35	90	Spencer Boyd	DGM Racing	Chevrolet	248	0	running	0
34	40	52	Akinori Ogata	Jimmy Means Racing	Chevrolet	247	0	running	0
35	25	6	Ryan Vargas	JD Motorsports	Chevrolet	246	0	running	2
36	18	48	Jade Buford	Big Machine Racing Team	Chevrolet	246	0	running	1
37	24	44	Tommy Joe Martins	Martins Motorsports	Chevrolet	227	5	accident	10
38	36	61	Stephen Leicht	Hattori Racing Enterprises	Toyota	220	0	running	1
39	31	4	Landon Cassill	JD Motorsports	Chevrolet	179	0	ignition	1
40	39	74	C. J. McLaughlin	Mike Harmon Racing	Chevrolet	111	0	accident	0
Failed to qualify
41		13	Timmy Hill	MBM Motorsports	Toyota				
Official race results

Previous race: 2021 Sport Clips Haircuts VFW 200	NASCAR Xfinity Series; 2021 season	Next race: 2021 Food City 300
