= 2022 New Holland 250 =

21st race of the 2022 NASCAR Xfinity Series

Race details
- Race 21 of 33 of the 2022 NASCAR Xfinity Series
- Date: August 6, 2022
- Official name: 30th Annual New Holland 250
- Location: Michigan International Speedway, Brooklyn, Michigan
- Course: Permanent racing facility
- Course length: 2.0 miles (3.2 km)
- Distance: 125 laps, 250 mi (400 km)
- Scheduled distance: 125 laps, 250 mi (400 km)
- Average speed: 141.621 mph (227.917 km/h)

Pole position
Driver	Noah Gragson	JR Motorsports
- Time: 37.821

Most laps led
Driver	Ty Gibbs	Joe Gibbs Racing
- Laps: 54

Winner
No. 54	Ty Gibbs	Joe Gibbs Racing

Television in the United States
- Network: USA Network
- Announcers: Rick Allen, Steve Letarte and Brad Daugherty

Radio in the United States
- Radio: Motor Racing Network

The 2022 New Holland 250 was the 21st stock car race of the 2022 NASCAR Xfinity Series, and the 30th iteration of the event. The race was held on Saturday, August 6, 2022, in Brooklyn, Michigan at Michigan International Speedway, a 2.0 miles (3.2 km) permanent oval-shaped racetrack. The race took the scheduled 125 laps to complete. Ty Gibbs, driving for Joe Gibbs Racing, dominated the final stages of the race, and earned his ninth career NASCAR Xfinity Series win, along with his fifth of the season. Gibbs would also lead the most laps, with 54. To fill out the podium, Justin Allgaier and Noah Gragson, both driving for JR Motorsports, would finish 2nd and 3rd, respectively.

== Background ==
Michigan International Speedway (MIS) is a 2-mile (3.2 km) moderate-banked D-shaped speedway located off U.S. Highway 12 on more than 1,400 acres (5.7 km^{2}) approximately four miles (6.4 km) south of the village of Brooklyn, in the scenic Irish Hills area of southeastern Michigan. The track is 70 miles (110 km) west of the center of Detroit, 40 miles (64 km) from Ann Arbor and 60 miles (97 km) south and northwest of Lansing and Toledo, Ohio respectively. The track is used primarily for NASCAR events. It is sometimes known as a sister track to Texas World Speedway, and was used as the basis of Auto Club Speedway. The track is owned by NASCAR. Michigan International Speedway is recognized as one of motorsports' premier facilities because of its wide racing surface and high banking (by open-wheel standards; the 18-degree banking is modest by stock car standards). Michigan is the fastest track in NASCAR due to its wide, sweeping corners, long straightaways, and lack of a restrictor plate requirement; typical qualifying speeds are in excess of 200 mph (320 km/h) and corner entry speeds are anywhere from 215 to 220 mph (346 to 354 km/h) after the 2012 repaving of the track.

=== Entry list ===
- (R) denotes rookie driver.
- (i) denotes driver who are ineligible for series driver points.

#	Driver	Team	Make
1	Sam Mayer	JR Motorsports	Chevrolet
02	Blaine Perkins (i)	Our Motorsports	Chevrolet
2	Sheldon Creed (R)	Richard Childress Racing	Chevrolet
4	Bayley Currey	JD Motorsports	Chevrolet
5	Josh Williams	B. J. McLeod Motorsports	Chevrolet
6	Ryan Vargas	JD Motorsports	Chevrolet
07	Joe Graf Jr.	SS-Green Light Racing	Ford
7	Justin Allgaier	JR Motorsports	Chevrolet
08	David Starr	SS-Green Light Racing	Ford
8	Josh Berry	JR Motorsports	Chevrolet
9	Noah Gragson	JR Motorsports	Chevrolet
10	Landon Cassill	Kaulig Racing	Chevrolet
11	Daniel Hemric	Kaulig Racing	Chevrolet
13	Akinori Ogata (i)	MBM Motorsports	Toyota
16	A. J. Allmendinger	Kaulig Racing	Chevrolet
18	Sammy Smith	Joe Gibbs Racing	Toyota
19	Brandon Jones	Joe Gibbs Racing	Toyota
21	Austin Hill (R)	Richard Childress Racing	Chevrolet
23	Anthony Alfredo	Our Motorsports	Chevrolet
26	John Hunter Nemechek (i)	Sam Hunt Racing	Toyota
27	Jeb Burton	Our Motorsports	Chevrolet
28	Kyle Sieg	RSS Racing	Ford
31	Myatt Snider	Jordan Anderson Racing	Chevrolet
32	Jordan Anderson (i)	Jordan Anderson Racing	Chevrolet
34	Kyle Weatherman	Jesse Iwuji Motorsports	Chevrolet
35	Patrick Emerling	Emerling-Gase Motorsports	Toyota
36	Alex Labbé	DGM Racing	Chevrolet
38	C. J. McLaughlin	RSS Racing	Ford
39	Ryan Sieg	RSS Racing	Ford
44	Ryan Ellis	Alpha Prime Racing	Chevrolet
45	Josh Bilicki (i)	Alpha Prime Racing	Chevrolet
47	Brennan Poole (i)	Mike Harmon Racing	Chevrolet
48	Kaz Grala (i)	Big Machine Racing	Chevrolet
51	Jeremy Clements	Jeremy Clements Racing	Chevrolet
54	Ty Gibbs	Joe Gibbs Racing	Toyota
66	J. J. Yeley	MBM Motorsports	Ford
68	Brandon Brown	Brandonbilt Motorsports	Chevrolet
77	Dillon Bassett	Bassett Racing	Chevrolet
78	Matt Mills (i)	B. J. McLeod Motorsports	Chevrolet
91	Mason Massey	DGM Racing	Chevrolet
98	Riley Herbst	Stewart-Haas Racing	Ford
Official entry list

== Practice ==
The only 30-minute practice session was held on Saturday, August 6, at 9:00 AM EST. Noah Gragson, driving for JR Motorsports, was the fastest in the session, with a lap of 38.642, and an average speed of 186.326 mph (299.863 km/h).

Pos.	#	Driver	Team	Make	Time	Speed
1	9	Noah Gragson	JR Motorsports	Chevrolet	38.642	186.326
2	16	A. J. Allmendinger	Kaulig Racing	Chevrolet	38.652	186.278
3	1	Sam Mayer	JR Motorsports	Chevrolet	38.672	186.181
Full practice results

== Qualifying ==
Qualifying was held on Saturday, August 6, at 9:30 AM EST. Since Michigan International Speedway is an oval track, the qualifying system used is a single-car, single-lap system with only one round. Whoever sets the fastest time in the round wins the pole. Noah Gragson, driving for JR Motorsports, scored the pole for the race, with a lap of 37.821, and an average speed of 190.370 mph (306.371 km/h).

Pos.	#	Driver	Team	Make	Time	Speed
1	9	Noah Gragson	JR Motorsports	Chevrolet	37.821	190.370
2	16	A. J. Allmendinger	Kaulig Racing	Chevrolet	37.827	190.340
3	7	Justin Allgaier	JR Motorsports	Chevrolet	37.966	189.643
4	11	Daniel Hemric	Kaulig Racing	Chevrolet	37.971	189.618
5	18	Sammy Smith	Joe Gibbs Racing	Toyota	37.983	189.558
6	8	Josh Berry	JR Motorsports	Chevrolet	38.142	188.768
7	19	Brandon Jones	Joe Gibbs Racing	Toyota	38.256	188.206
8	34	Kyle Weatherman	Jesse Iwuji Motorsports	Chevrolet	38.262	188.176
9	54	Ty Gibbs	Joe Gibbs Racing	Toyota	38.265	188.162
10	68	Brandon Brown	Brandonbilt Motorsports	Chevrolet	38.287	188.053
11	2	Sheldon Creed (R)	Richard Childress Racing	Chevrolet	38.326	187.862
12	10	Landon Cassill	Kaulig Racing	Chevrolet	38.384	187.578
13	98	Riley Herbst	Stewart-Haas Racing	Ford	38.446	187.276
14	77	Dillon Bassett	Bassett Racing	Chevrolet	38.453	187.242
15	39	Ryan Sieg	RSS Racing	Ford	38.622	186.422
16	21	Austin Hill (R)	Richard Childress Racing	Chevrolet	38.650	186.287
17	31	Myatt Snider	Jordan Anderson Racing	Chevrolet	38.685	186.119
18	28	Kyle Sieg	RSS Racing	Ford	38.691	186.090
19	27	Jeb Burton	Our Motorsports	Chevrolet	38.699	186.051
20	23	Anthony Alfredo	Our Motorsports	Chevrolet	38.728	185.912
21	51	Jeremy Clements	Jeremy Clements Racing	Chevrolet	38.744	185.835
22	66	J. J. Yeley	MBM Motorsports	Ford	38.744	185.835
23	48	Kaz Grala (i)	Big Machine Racing	Chevrolet	38.780	185.663
24	07	Joe Graf Jr.	SS-Green Light Racing	Ford	38.839	185.381
25	45	Josh Bilicki	Alpha Prime Racing	Chevrolet	38.846	185.347
26	1	Sam Mayer	JR Motorsports	Chevrolet	38.881	185.180
27	6	Ryan Vargas	JD Motorsports	Chevrolet	39.015	184.544
28	5	Josh Williams	B. J. McLeod Motorsports	Chevrolet	39.024	184.502
29	91	Mason Massey	DGM Racing	Chevrolet	39.184	183.748
30	36	Alex Labbé	DGM Racing	Chevrolet	39.204	183.655
31	26	John Hunter Nemechek (i)	Sam Hunt Racing	Toyota	39.254	183.421
32	35	Patrick Emerling	Emerling-Gase Motorsports	Toyota	39.454	182.491
33	44	Ryan Ellis	Alpha Prime Racing	Chevrolet	39.520	182.186
Qualified by owner's points
34	38	C. J. McLaughlin	RSS Racing	Ford	39.771	181.036
35	4	Bayley Currey	JD Motorsports	Chevrolet	41.074	175.293
36	02	Blaine Perkins (i)	Our Motorsports	Chevrolet	-	-
37	08	David Starr	SS-Green Light Racing	Ford	-	-
38	78	Matt Mills (i)	B. J. McLeod Motorsports	Chevrolet	-	-
Failed to qualify
39	47	Brennan Poole (i)	Mike Harmon Racing	Chevrolet	39.669	181.502
40	13	Akinori Ogata (i)	MBM Motorsports	Toyota	40.751	176.683
41	32	Jordan Anderson (i)	Jordan Anderson Racing	Chevrolet	-	-
Official starting lineup

== Race results ==
Stage 1 Laps: 30

Pos.	#	Driver	Team	Make	Pts
1	9	Noah Gragson	JR Motorsports	Chevrolet	10
2	7	Justin Allgaier	JR Motorsports	Chevrolet	9
3	18	Sammy Smith	Joe Gibbs Racing	Toyota	8
4	16	A. J. Allmendinger	Kaulig Racing	Chevrolet	7
5	54	Ty Gibbs	Joe Gibbs Racing	Toyota	6
6	19	Brandon Jones	Joe Gibbs Racing	Toyota	5
7	11	Daniel Hemric	Kaulig Racing	Chevrolet	4
8	21	Austin Hill (R)	Richard Childress Racing	Chevrolet	3
9	10	Landon Cassill	Kaulig Racing	Chevrolet	2
10	8	Josh Berry	JR Motorsports	Chevrolet	1

Stage 2 Laps: 30

Pos.	#	Driver	Team	Make	Pts
1	9	Noah Gragson	JR Motorsports	Chevrolet	10
2	16	A. J. Allmendinger	Kaulig Racing	Chevrolet	9
3	8	Josh Berry	JR Motorsports	Chevrolet	8
4	10	Landon Cassill	Kaulig Racing	Chevrolet	7
5	39	Ryan Sieg	RSS Racing	Ford	6
6	23	Anthony Alfredo	Our Motorsports	Chevrolet	5
7	48	Kaz Grala (i)	Big Machine Racing	Chevrolet	0
8	31	Myatt Snider	Jordan Anderson Racing	Chevrolet	3
9	54	Ty Gibbs	Joe Gibbs Racing	Toyota	2
10	21	Austin Hill (R)	Richard Childress Racing	Chevrolet	1

Stage 3 Laps: 65

Fin.	St	#	Driver	Team	Make	Laps	Led	Status	Pts
1	9	54	Ty Gibbs	Joe Gibbs Racing	Toyota	125	54	Running	48
2	3	7	Justin Allgaier	JR Motorsports	Chevrolet	125	17	Running	43
3	1	9	Noah Gragson	JR Motorsports	Chevrolet	125	39	Running	54
4	7	19	Brandon Jones	Joe Gibbs Racing	Toyota	125	0	Running	38
5	16	21	Austin Hill (R)	Richard Childress Racing	Chevrolet	125	1	Running	36
6	6	8	Josh Berry	JR Motorsports	Chevrolet	125	3	Running	40
7	2	16	A. J. Allmendinger	Kaulig Racing	Chevrolet	125	7	Running	46
8	4	11	Daniel Hemric	Kaulig Racing	Chevrolet	125	0	Running	33
9	13	98	Riley Herbst	Stewart-Haas Racing	Ford	125	0	Running	28
10	12	10	Landon Cassill	Kaulig Racing	Chevrolet	125	0	Running	36
11	11	2	Sheldon Creed (R)	Richard Childress Racing	Chevrolet	125	0	Running	26
12	5	18	Sammy Smith	Joe Gibbs Racing	Toyota	125	1	Running	33
13	10	68	Brandon Brown	Brandonbilt Motorsports	Chevrolet	124	0	Running	24
14	20	23	Anthony Alfredo	Our Motorsports	Chevrolet	124	1	Running	28
15	15	39	Ryan Sieg	RSS Racing	Ford	124	2	Running	28
16	8	34	Kyle Weatherman	Jesse Iwuji Motorsports	Chevrolet	124	0	Running	21
17	17	31	Myatt Snider	Jordan Anderson Racing	Chevrolet	124	0	Running	23
18	23	48	Kaz Grala (i)	Big Machine Racing	Chevrolet	124	0	Running	0
19	31	26	John Hunter Nemechek (i)	Sam Hunt Racing	Toyota	124	0	Running	0
20	22	66	J. J. Yeley	MBM Motorsports	Ford	124	0	Running	17
21	18	28	Kyle Sieg	RSS Racing	Ford	124	0	Running	16
22	19	27	Jeb Burton	Our Motorsports	Chevrolet	124	0	Running	15
23	24	07	Joe Graf Jr.	SS-Green Light Racing	Ford	124	0	Running	14
24	29	91	Mason Massey	DGM Racing	Chevrolet	124	0	Running	13
25	32	35	Patrick Emerling	Emerling-Gase Motorsports	Toyota	124	0	Running	12
26	30	36	Alex Labbé	DGM Racing	Chevrolet	124	0	Running	11
27	33	44	Ryan Ellis	Alpha Prime Racing	Chevrolet	124	0	Running	10
28	25	45	Josh Bilicki (i)	Alpha Prime Racing	Chevrolet	124	0	Running	0
29	27	6	Ryan Vargas	JD Motorsports	Chevrolet	123	0	Running	8
30	35	4	Bayley Currey	JD Motorsports	Chevrolet	123	0	Running	7
31	21	51	Jeremy Clements	Jeremy Clements Racing	Chevrolet	123	0	Running	6
32	36	02	Blaine Perkins (i)	Our Motorsports	Chevrolet	123	0	Running	0
33	26	1	Sam Mayer	JR Motorsports	Chevrolet	123	0	Running	4
34	14	77	Dillon Bassett	Bassett Racing	Chevrolet	122	0	Running	3
35	37	08	David Starr	SS-Green Light Racing	Ford	100	0	Hub	2
36	28	5	Josh Williams	B. J. McLeod Motorsports	Chevrolet	87	0	Electrical	1
37	34	38	C. J. McLaughlin	RSS Racing	Ford	40	0	Accident	1
38	38	78	Matt Mills (i)	B. J. McLeod Motorsports	Chevrolet	39	0	Accident	0
Official race results

== Standings after the race ==
Drivers' Championship standings

	Pos	Driver	Points
	1	A. J. Allmendinger	835
	2	Justin Allgaier	816 (-19)
	3	Ty Gibbs	807 (-28)
1	4	Noah Gragson	748 (-87)
1	5	Josh Berry	737 (-98)
	6	Austin Hill	664 (-171)
	7	Brandon Jones	634 (-201)
1	8	Riley Herbst	583 (-252)
1	9	Sam Mayer	578 (-257)
	10	Daniel Hemric	545 (-290)
	11	Landon Cassill	513 (-322)
	12	Ryan Sieg	499 (-336)
Official driver's standings

- Note: Only the first 12 positions are included for the driver standings.

Previous race: 2022 Pennzoil 150	NASCAR Xfinity Series; 2022 season	Next race: 2022 Sunoco Go Rewards 200 at The Glen
