= 2021 Food City 300 =

Race details
- Race 26 of 33 of the 2021 NASCAR Xfinity Series
- Date: September 17, 2021
- Official name: Food City 300
- Location: Bristol, Tennessee, Bristol Motor Speedway
- Course: Permanent racing facility
- Course length: 0.533 miles (0.858 km)
- Distance: 306 laps, 163.098 mi (262.548 km)
- Scheduled distance: 300 laps, 159.9 mi (257.334 km)
- Average speed: 75.026 miles per hour (120.743 km/h)

Pole position
Driver	Noah Gragson	JR Motorsports
- Grid positions set by competition-based formula

Most laps led
Driver	Justin Allgaier	JR Motorsports
- Laps: 92

Winner
No. 16	A. J. Allmendinger	Kaulig Racing

Television in the United States
- Network: NBCSN
- Announcers: Rick Allen, Jeff Burton, Steve Letarte, Dale Earnhardt Jr.

Radio in the United States
- Radio: Motor Racing Network

The 2021 Food City 300 was the 26th stock car race of the 2021 NASCAR Xfinity Series season, the final race of the NASCAR Xfinity Series regular season, and the 40th iteration of the event. The race was held on Friday, September 17, 2021 in Bristol, Tennessee at Bristol Motor Speedway, a 0.533 miles (0.858 km) permanent oval-shaped racetrack. The race was extended from the scheduled 300 laps to 306 due to a late race caution, setting up a NASCAR overtime finish. In a wild finish, Austin Cindric and A. J. Allmendinger wrecked across the line after a wild restart saw numerous passes for position in the lead positions. The person who crossed the line first was A. J. Allmendinger, cementing a win for Allmendinger, his 9th win of his career and the 4th of the season. To fill out the podium, Riley Herbst of Stewart-Haas Racing would finish 3rd.

== Background ==
The layout of Bristol Motor Speedway, the venue where the race was held.

The Bristol Motor Speedway, formerly known as Bristol International Raceway and Bristol Raceway, is a NASCAR short track venue located in Bristol, Tennessee. Constructed in 1960, it held its first NASCAR race on July 30, 1961. Despite its short length, Bristol is among the most popular tracks on the NASCAR schedule because of its distinct features, which include extraordinarily steep banking, an all concrete surface, two pit roads, and stadium-like seating. It has also been named one of the loudest NASCAR tracks.

=== Entry list ===
#	Driver	Team	Make	Sponsor
0	Jeffrey Earnhardt	JD Motorsports	Chevrolet	ForeverLawn Premium Synthetic Grass
1	Josh Berry	JR Motorsports	Chevrolet	Pilot Flying J "If You've Got It A Trucker Brought It"
2	Myatt Snider	Richard Childress Racing	Chevrolet	Crosley Furniture
02	Brett Moffitt	Our Motorsports	Chevrolet	Fr8Auctions
4	Landon Cassill	JD Motorsports	Chevrolet	Voyager
5	Stefan Parsons	B. J. McLeod Motorsports	Toyota	Sokal Digital
6	Ryan Vargas	JD Motorsports	Chevrolet	JD Motorsports
7	Justin Allgaier	JR Motorsports	Chevrolet	Brandt Professional Agriculture
07	Joe Graf Jr.	SS-Green Light Racing	Chevrolet	KeepItSecure.net
8	Sam Mayer	JR Motorsports	Chevrolet	Tire Pros
9	Noah Gragson	JR Motorsports	Chevrolet	Bass Pro Shops, TrueTimber Camo, Black Rifle Coffee Company
10	Jeb Burton	Kaulig Racing	Chevrolet	Nutrien Ag Solutions
11	Justin Haley	Kaulig Racing	Chevrolet	LeafFilter Gutter Protection
13	Timmy Hill	MBM Motorsports	Toyota	
15	B. J. McLeod	JD Motorsports	Chevrolet	JD Motorsports
16	A. J. Allmendinger	Kaulig Racing	Chevrolet	Barger Precast
17	Carson Ware	SS-Green Light Racing with Rick Ware Racing	Chevrolet	Little 5 Pizza, Pounds Property Management
18	Daniel Hemric	Joe Gibbs Racing	Toyota	Poppy Bank
19	Brandon Jones	Joe Gibbs Racing	Toyota	Yee Yee Apparel
20	Harrison Burton	Joe Gibbs Racing	Toyota	DEX Imaging
22	Austin Cindric	Team Penske	Ford	Menards, Richmond Water Heaters
23	Ty Dillon	Our Motorsports	Chevrolet	HomeTown Lenders
26	Brandon Gdovic	Sam Hunt Racing	Toyota	SnapMobile.shop
31	Sage Karam	Jordan Anderson Racing	Chevrolet	Montage Mountain
36	Alex Labbé	DGM Racing	Chevrolet	Prolon Controls
39	Ryan Sieg	RSS Racing	Ford	CMR Construction & Roofing
44	Tommy Joe Martins	Martins Motorsports	Chevrolet	AAN Adjusters
47	Kyle Weatherman	Mike Harmon Racing	Chevrolet	AXE Crossbows
48	Jade Buford	Big Machine Racing Team	Chevrolet	Big Machine Vodka Spiked Cooler
51	Jeremy Clements	Jeremy Clements Racing	Chevrolet	All South Electric
52	Gray Gaulding	Jimmy Means Racing	Chevrolet	Panini America UFC Prizm
54	Ty Gibbs	Joe Gibbs Racing	Toyota	Joe Gibbs Racing
61	Chad Finchum	Hattori Racing Enterprises	Toyota	Black Oak Contracting, Inc.
66	David Starr	MBM Motorsports	Toyota	Whataburger
68	Brandon Brown	Brandonbilt Motorsports	Chevrolet	JABS Construction
74	Bayley Currey	Mike Harmon Racing	Chevrolet	GPSTab, JM Steel
78	Jesse Little	B. J. McLeod Motorsports	Chevrolet	David's Electric
90	Spencer Boyd	DGM Racing	Chevrolet	BeerPongToss, Alloy Employer Services "Stronger by design"
92	Josh Williams	DGM Racing	Chevrolet	Workpro Tools
98	Riley Herbst	Stewart-Haas Racing	Ford	Monster Energy
99	Matt Mills	B. J. McLeod Motorsports	Chevrolet	J. F. Electric
Official entry list

== Starting lineup ==
Qualifying was determined by a qualifying metric system based on the last race, the 2021 Go Bowling 250 and owner's points. As a result, Noah Gragson of JR Motorsports won the pole.

Pos.	#	Driver	Team	Make
1	9	Noah Gragson	JR Motorsports	Chevrolet
2	7	Justin Allgaier	JR Motorsports	Chevrolet
3	54	Ty Gibbs	Joe Gibbs Racing	Toyota
4	18	Daniel Hemric	Joe Gibbs Racing	Toyota
5	11	Justin Haley	Kaulig Racing	Chevrolet
6	20	Harrison Burton	Joe Gibbs Racing	Toyota
7	10	Jeb Burton	Kaulig Racing	Chevrolet
8	98	Riley Herbst	Stewart-Haas Racing	Ford
9	22	Austin Cindric	Team Penske	Ford
10	16	A. J. Allmendinger	Kaulig Racing	Chevrolet
11	68	Brandon Brown	Brandonbilt Motorsports	Chevrolet
12	39	Ryan Sieg	RSS Racing	Ford
13	51	Jeremy Clements	Jeremy Clements Racing	Chevrolet
14	36	Alex Labbé	DGM Racing	Chevrolet
15	1	Josh Berry	JR Motorsports	Chevrolet
16	19	Brandon Jones	Joe Gibbs Racing	Toyota
17	2	Myatt Snider	Richard Childress Racing	Chevrolet
18	92	Josh Williams	DGM Racing	Chevrolet
19	47	Kyle Weatherman	Mike Harmon Racing	Chevrolet
20	02	Brett Moffitt	Our Motorsports	Chevrolet
21	26	Brandon Gdovic	Sam Hunt Racing	Toyota
22	8	Sam Mayer	JR Motorsports	Chevrolet
23	44	Tommy Joe Martins	Martins Motorsports	Chevrolet
24	66	David Starr	MBM Motorsports	Toyota
25	78	Jesse Little	B. J. McLeod Motorsports	Chevrolet
26	99	Matt Mills	B. J. McLeod Motorsports	Chevrolet
27	5	Stefan Parsons	B. J. McLeod Motorsports	Toyota
28	6	Ryan Vargas	JD Motorsports	Chevrolet
29	0	Jeffrey Earnhardt	JD Motorsports	Chevrolet
30	48	Jade Buford	Big Machine Racing Team	Chevrolet
31	23	Ty Dillon	Our Motorsports	Chevrolet
32	31	Sage Karam	Jordan Anderson Racing	Chevrolet
33	90	Spencer Boyd	DGM Racing	Chevrolet
34	17	Carson Ware	SS-Green Light Racing with Rick Ware Racing	Chevrolet
35	4	Landon Cassill	JD Motorsports	Chevrolet
36	07	Joe Graf Jr.	SS-Green Light Racing	Chevrolet
37	15	B. J. McLeod	JD Motorsports	Chevrolet
38	61	Chad Finchum	Hattori Racing Enterprises	Toyota
39	52	Gray Gaulding	Jimmy Means Racing	Chevrolet
40	74	Bayley Currey	Mike Harmon Racing	Chevrolet
Failed to qualify
41	13	Timmy Hill	MBM Motorsports	Toyota
Official starting lineup

== Race results ==
Stage 1 Laps: 85

Fin	#	Driver	Team	Make	Pts
1	7	Justin Allgaier	JR Motorsports	Chevrolet	10
2	18	Daniel Hemric	Joe Gibbs Racing	Toyota	9
3	9	Noah Gragson	JR Motorsports	Chevrolet	8
4	11	Justin Haley	Kaulig Racing	Chevrolet	7
5	8	Sam Mayer	JR Motorsports	Chevrolet	6
6	16	A. J. Allmendinger	Kaulig Racing	Chevrolet	5
7	22	Austin Cindric	Team Penske	Ford	4
8	19	Brandon Jones	Joe Gibbs Racing	Toyota	3
9	54	Ty Gibbs	Joe Gibbs Racing	Toyota	2
10	20	Harrison Burton	Joe Gibbs Racing	Toyota	1

Stage 2 Laps: 85

Fin	#	Driver	Team	Make	Pts
1	18	Daniel Hemric	Joe Gibbs Racing	Toyota	10
2	7	Justin Allgaier	JR Motorsports	Chevrolet	9
3	9	Noah Gragson	JR Motorsports	Chevrolet	8
4	11	Justin Haley	Kaulig Racing	Chevrolet	7
5	22	Austin Cindric	Team Penske	Ford	6
6	16	A. J. Allmendinger	Kaulig Racing	Chevrolet	5
7	54	Ty Gibbs	Joe Gibbs Racing	Toyota	4
8	19	Brandon Jones	Joe Gibbs Racing	Toyota	3
9	39	Ryan Sieg	RSS Racing	Ford	2
10	10	Jeb Burton	Kaulig Racing	Chevrolet	1

Stage 3 Laps: 136

Fin	St	#	Driver	Team	Make	Laps	Led	Status	Pts
1	10	16	A. J. Allmendinger	Kaulig Racing	Chevrolet	306	1	running	50
2	9	22	Austin Cindric	Team Penske	Ford	306	75	running	45
3	8	98	Riley Herbst	Stewart-Haas Racing	Ford	306	0	running	34
4	2	7	Justin Allgaier	JR Motorsports	Chevrolet	306	92	running	52
5	16	19	Brandon Jones	Joe Gibbs Racing	Toyota	306	0	running	38
6	5	11	Justin Haley	Kaulig Racing	Chevrolet	306	0	running	45
7	6	20	Harrison Burton	Joe Gibbs Racing	Toyota	306	0	running	31
8	17	2	Myatt Snider	Richard Childress Racing	Chevrolet	306	0	running	29
9	22	8	Sam Mayer	JR Motorsports	Chevrolet	306	49	running	34
10	4	18	Daniel Hemric	Joe Gibbs Racing	Toyota	306	78	running	46
11	3	54	Ty Gibbs	Joe Gibbs Racing	Toyota	306	0	running	32
12	1	9	Noah Gragson	JR Motorsports	Chevrolet	306	4	running	41
13	13	51	Jeremy Clements	Jeremy Clements Racing	Chevrolet	306	0	running	24
14	11	68	Brandon Brown	Brandonbilt Motorsports	Chevrolet	306	0	running	23
15	31	23	Ty Dillon	Our Motorsports	Chevrolet	305	0	running	22
16	32	31	Sage Karam	Jordan Anderson Racing	Chevrolet	305	0	running	21
17	36	07	Joe Graf Jr.	SS-Green Light Racing	Chevrolet	305	0	running	20
18	39	52	Gray Gaulding	Jimmy Means Racing	Chevrolet	305	0	running	19
19	14	36	Alex Labbé	DGM Racing	Chevrolet	305	0	running	18
20	18	92	Josh Williams	DGM Racing	Chevrolet	305	0	running	17
21	21	26	Brandon Gdovic	Sam Hunt Racing	Toyota	305	0	running	16
22	27	5	Stefan Parsons	B. J. McLeod Motorsports	Toyota	304	0	running	15
23	23	44	Tommy Joe Martins	Martins Motorsports	Chevrolet	304	0	running	14
24	7	10	Jeb Burton	Kaulig Racing	Chevrolet	303	7	running	14
25	29	0	Jeffrey Earnhardt	JD Motorsports	Chevrolet	303	0	running	12
26	37	15	B. J. McLeod	JD Motorsports	Chevrolet	303	0	running	0
27	30	48	Jade Buford	Big Machine Racing Team	Chevrolet	302	0	running	10
28	25	78	Jesse Little	B. J. McLeod Motorsports	Chevrolet	302	0	running	9
29	19	47	Kyle Weatherman	Mike Harmon Racing	Chevrolet	301	0	running	8
30	24	66	David Starr	MBM Motorsports	Toyota	300	0	running	7
31	33	90	Spencer Boyd	DGM Racing	Chevrolet	298	0	running	0
32	34	17	Carson Ware	SS-Green Light Racing with Rick Ware Racing	Chevrolet	297	0	running	5
33	38	61	Chad Finchum	Hattori Racing Enterprises	Toyota	282	0	running	4
34	12	39	Ryan Sieg	RSS Racing	Ford	259	0	fuel pump	5
35	15	1	Josh Berry	JR Motorsports	Chevrolet	215	0	running	2
36	26	99	Matt Mills	B. J. McLeod Motorsports	Chevrolet	108	0	accident	1
37	28	6	Ryan Vargas	JD Motorsports	Chevrolet	94	0	brakes	1
38	40	74	Bayley Currey	Mike Harmon Racing	Chevrolet	53	0	brakes	0
39	35	4	Landon Cassill	JD Motorsports	Chevrolet	40	0	electrical	1
40	20	02	Brett Moffitt	Our Motorsports	Chevrolet	9	0	accident	1
Failed to qualify
41		13	Timmy Hill	MBM Motorsports	Toyota				
Official race results

Previous race: 2021 Go Bowling 250	NASCAR Xfinity Series; 2021 season	Next race: 2021 Alsco Uniforms 302
