= 2025 North Carolina Education Lottery 200 =

11th race of the 2025 NASCAR Craftsman Truck Series

Race details
- Race 11 of 25 of the 2025 NASCAR Craftsman Truck Series
- Date: May 23, 2025
- Official name: 22nd Annual North Carolina Education Lottery 200
- Location: Charlotte Motor Speedway in Concord, North Carolina
- Course: Permanent racing facility
- Course length: 1.5 miles (2.4 km)
- Distance: 134 laps, 201 mi (323 km)
- Scheduled distance: 134 laps, 201 mi (323 km)
- Average speed: 128.800 mph (207.284 km/h)

Pole position
Driver	Gio Ruggiero	Tricon Garage
- Time: 30.177

Most laps led
Driver	Corey Heim	Tricon Garage
- Laps: 98

Winner
No. 11	Corey Heim	Tricon Garage

Television in the United States
- Network: FS1
- Announcers: Kevin Harvick, Joey Logano, and Michael Waltrip

Radio in the United States
- Radio: NRN

The 2025 North Carolina Education Lottery 200 was the 11th stock car race of the 2025 NASCAR Craftsman Truck Series, and the 23rd iteration of the event. The race was held on Friday, May 23, 2025, at Charlotte Motor Speedway in Concord, North Carolina, a 1.5 miles (2.4 km) permanent asphalt tri-oval shaped intermediate speedway. The race took the scheduled 134 laps to complete.

In a blistering performance, Corey Heim, driving for Tricon Garage, would sweep the entire race, earning the fastest lap bonus, winning both stages, and leading a race-high 98 laps to earn his 15th career NASCAR Craftsman Truck Series win, and his fourth of the season. To fill out the podium, Ross Chastain and Kaden Honeycutt, both driving for Niece Motorsports, would finish 2nd and 3rd, respectively.

== Report ==
=== Background ===
Charlotte Motor Speedway, the track where the race will be held.

The race will be held at Charlotte Motor Speedway, located in Concord, North Carolina. The speedway complex includes a 1.5-mile (2.4 km) quad-oval track that was utilized for the race, as well as a dragstrip and a dirt track. The speedway was built in 1959 by Bruton Smith and is considered the home track for NASCAR with many race teams based in the Charlotte metropolitan area. The track is owned and operated by Speedway Motorsports Inc. (SMI) with Marcus G. Smith serving as track president.

==== Entry list ====
- (R) denotes rookie driver.
- (i) denotes driver who is ineligible for series driver points.

#	Driver	Team	Make
1	Brandon Jones (i)	Tricon Garage	Toyota
02	Stefan Parsons	Young's Motorsports	Chevrolet
2	Cody Dennison	Reaume Brothers Racing	Ford
5	Toni Breidinger (R)	Tricon Garage	Toyota
07	B. J. McLeod	Spire Motorsports	Chevrolet
7	Kyle Busch (i)	Spire Motorsports	Chevrolet
9	Grant Enfinger	CR7 Motorsports	Chevrolet
11	Corey Heim	Tricon Garage	Toyota
13	Jake Garcia	ThorSport Racing	Ford
15	Tanner Gray	Tricon Garage	Toyota
17	Gio Ruggiero (R)	Tricon Garage	Toyota
18	Tyler Ankrum	McAnally-Hilgemann Racing	Chevrolet
19	Daniel Hemric	McAnally-Hilgemann Racing	Chevrolet
22	Mason Maggio (i)	Reaume Brothers Racing	Ford
26	Dawson Sutton (R)	Rackley W.A.R.	Chevrolet
33	Frankie Muniz (R)	Reaume Brothers Racing	Ford
34	Layne Riggs	Front Row Motorsports	Ford
38	Chandler Smith	Front Row Motorsports	Ford
42	Matt Mills	Niece Motorsports	Chevrolet
44	Ross Chastain (i)	Niece Motorsports	Chevrolet
45	Kaden Honeycutt	Niece Motorsports	Chevrolet
52	Stewart Friesen	Halmar Friesen Racing	Toyota
56	Timmy Hill	Hill Motorsports	Toyota
66	Luke Fenhaus (R)	ThorSport Racing	Ford
71	Rajah Caruth	Spire Motorsports	Chevrolet
75	Parker Kligerman	Henderson Motorsports	Chevrolet
76	Spencer Boyd	Freedom Racing Enterprises	Chevrolet
77	Andrés Pérez de Lara (R)	Spire Motorsports	Chevrolet
81	Connor Mosack (R)	McAnally-Hilgemann Racing	Chevrolet
88	Matt Crafton	ThorSport Racing	Ford
90	Justin Carroll	TC Motorsports	Toyota
91	Jack Wood	McAnally-Hilgemann Racing	Chevrolet
98	Ty Majeski	ThorSport Racing	Ford
99	Ben Rhodes	ThorSport Racing	Ford
Official entry list

== Practice ==
For practice, drivers were separated into two groups, A and B. Both sessions were 25 minutes long, and was held on Friday, May 23, at 3:35 PM EST. Ross Chastain, driving for Niece Motorsports, would set the fastest time in the session, with a lap of 30.643, and a speed of 176.223 mph (283.603 km/h).

Pos.	#	Driver	Team	Make	Time	Speed
1	44	Ross Chastain (i)	Niece Motorsports	Chevrolet	30.643	176.223
2	98	Ty Majeski	ThorSport Racing	Ford	30.658	176.137
3	11	Corey Heim	Tricon Garage	Toyota	30.717	175.798
Full practice results

== Qualifying ==
Qualifying was held on Friday, May 23, at 4:40 PM EST. Since Charlotte Motor Speedway is an intermediate racetrack, the qualifying procedure used is a single-car, one-lap system with one round. Drivers will be on track by themselves and will have one lap to post a qualifying time, and whoever sets the fastest time will win the pole.

Gio Ruggiero, driving for Tricon Garage, would score the pole for the race, with a lap of 30.177, and a speed of 178.944 mph (287.982 km/h).

No drivers would fail to qualify.

=== Qualifying results ===
Pos.	#	Driver	Team	Make	Time	Speed
1	17	Gio Ruggiero (R)	Tricon Garage	Toyota	30.177	178.944
2	15	Tanner Gray	Tricon Garage	Toyota	30.215	178.719
3	11	Corey Heim	Tricon Garage	Toyota	30.217	178.707
4	44	Ross Chastain (i)	Niece Motorsports	Chevrolet	30.239	178.577
5	45	Kaden Honeycutt	Niece Motorsports	Chevrolet	30.258	178.465
6	19	Daniel Hemric	McAnally-Hilgemann Racing	Chevrolet	30.276	178.359
7	34	Layne Riggs	Front Row Motorsports	Ford	30.358	177.877
8	71	Rajah Caruth	Spire Motorsports	Chevrolet	30.373	177.789
9	38	Chandler Smith	Front Row Motorsports	Ford	30.375	177.778
10	13	Jake Garcia	ThorSport Racing	Ford	30.386	177.713
11	98	Ty Majeski	ThorSport Racing	Ford	30.390	177.690
12	7	Kyle Busch (i)	Spire Motorsports	Chevrolet	30.412	177.561
13	1	Brandon Jones (i)	Tricon Garage	Toyota	30.470	177.223
14	77	Andrés Pérez de Lara (R)	Spire Motorsports	Chevrolet	30.531	176.869
15	81	Connor Mosack (R)	McAnally-Hilgemann Racing	Chevrolet	30.541	176.811
16	42	Matt Mills	Niece Motorsports	Chevrolet	30.596	176.494
17	26	Dawson Sutton (R)	Rackley W.A.R.	Chevrolet	30.597	176.488
18	9	Grant Enfinger	CR7 Motorsports	Chevrolet	30.603	176.453
19	07	B. J. McLeod	Spire Motorsports	Chevrolet	30.684	175.987
20	02	Stefan Parsons	Young's Motorsports	Chevrolet	30.691	175.947
21	99	Ben Rhodes	ThorSport Racing	Ford	30.754	175.587
22	91	Jack Wood	McAnally-Hilgemann Racing	Chevrolet	30.820	175.211
23	18	Tyler Ankrum	McAnally-Hilgemann Racing	Chevrolet	30.822	175.200
24	75	Parker Kligerman	Henderson Motorsports	Chevrolet	30.868	174.938
25	5	Toni Breidinger (R)	Tricon Garage	Toyota	31.012	174.126
26	88	Matt Crafton	ThorSport Racing	Ford	31.070	173.801
27	56	Timmy Hill	Hill Motorsports	Toyota	31.369	172.144
28	76	Spencer Boyd	Freedom Racing Enterprises	Chevrolet	32.286	167.255
29	2	Cody Dennison	Reaume Brothers Racing	Ford	32.794	164.664
30	90	Justin Carroll	TC Motorsports	Toyota	33.571	160.853
31	33	Frankie Muniz (R)	Reaume Brothers Racing	Ford	–	–
Qualified by owner's points
32	52	Stewart Friesen	Halmar Friesen Racing	Toyota	–	–
33	66	Luke Fenhaus (R)	ThorSport Racing	Ford	–	–
34	22	Mason Maggio (i)	Reaume Brothers Racing	Ford	–	–
Official qualifying results
Official starting lineup

== Race results ==
Stage 1 Laps: 30

Pos.	#	Driver	Team	Make	Pts
1	11	Corey Heim	Tricon Garage	Toyota	10
2	44	Ross Chastain (i)	Niece Motorsports	Chevrolet	0
3	34	Layne Riggs	Front Row Motorsports	Ford	8
4	45	Kaden Honeycutt	Niece Motorsports	Chevrolet	7
5	7	Kyle Busch (i)	Spire Motorsports	Chevrolet	0
6	17	Gio Ruggiero (R)	Tricon Garage	Toyota	5
7	19	Daniel Hemric	McAnally-Hilgemann Racing	Chevrolet	4
8	38	Chandler Smith	Front Row Motorsports	Ford	3
9	98	Ty Majeski	ThorSport Racing	Ford	2
10	42	Matt Mills	Niece Motorsports	Chevrolet	1

Stage 2 Laps: 30

Pos.	#	Driver	Team	Make	Pts
1	11	Corey Heim	Tricon Garage	Toyota	10
2	45	Kaden Honeycutt	Niece Motorsports	Chevrolet	9
3	7	Kyle Busch (i)	Spire Motorsports	Chevrolet	0
4	34	Layne Riggs	Front Row Motorsports	Ford	7
5	44	Ross Chastain (i)	Niece Motorsports	Chevrolet	0
6	19	Daniel Hemric	McAnally-Hilgemann Racing	Chevrolet	5
7	98	Ty Majeski	ThorSport Racing	Ford	4
8	17	Gio Ruggiero (R)	Tricon Garage	Toyota	3
9	38	Chandler Smith	Front Row Motorsports	Ford	2
10	9	Grant Enfinger	CR7 Motorsports	Chevrolet	1

Stage 3 Laps: 74

Fin	St	#	Driver	Team	Make	Laps	Led	Status	Pts
1	3	11	Corey Heim	Tricon Garage	Toyota	134	98	Running	61
2	4	44	Ross Chastain (i)	Niece Motorsports	Chevrolet	134	11	Running	0
3	5	45	Kaden Honeycutt	Niece Motorsports	Chevrolet	134	10	Running	50
4	7	34	Layne Riggs	Front Row Motorsports	Ford	134	0	Running	48
5	12	7	Kyle Busch (i)	Spire Motorsports	Chevrolet	134	0	Running	0
6	18	9	Grant Enfinger	CR7 Motorsports	Chevrolet	134	0	Running	32
7	16	42	Matt Mills	Niece Motorsports	Chevrolet	134	1	Running	31
8	6	19	Daniel Hemric	McAnally-Hilgemann Racing	Chevrolet	134	0	Running	38
9	8	71	Rajah Caruth	Spire Motorsports	Chevrolet	134	10	Running	28
10	13	1	Brandon Jones (i)	Tricon Garage	Toyota	134	0	Running	0
11	10	13	Jake Garcia	ThorSport Racing	Ford	134	0	Running	26
12	23	18	Tyler Ankrum	McAnally-Hilgemann Racing	Chevrolet	134	0	Running	25
13	32	52	Stewart Friesen	Halmar Friesen Racing	Toyota	133	1	Running	24
14	24	75	Parker Kligerman	Henderson Motorsports	Chevrolet	133	0	Running	23
15	19	07	B. J. McLeod	Spire Motorsports	Chevrolet	133	0	Running	22
16	14	77	Andrés Pérez de Lara (R)	Spire Motorsports	Chevrolet	133	0	Running	21
17	21	99	Ben Rhodes	ThorSport Racing	Ford	133	0	Running	20
18	33	66	Luke Fenhaus (R)	ThorSport Racing	Ford	133	0	Running	19
19	27	56	Timmy Hill	Hill Motorsports	Toyota	133	1	Running	18
20	26	88	Matt Crafton	ThorSport Racing	Ford	132	0	Running	17
21	1	17	Gio Ruggiero (R)	Tricon Garage	Toyota	132	2	Running	24
22	20	02	Stefan Parsons	Young's Motorsports	Chevrolet	132	0	Running	15
23	15	81	Connor Mosack (R)	McAnally-Hilgemann Racing	Chevrolet	132	0	Running	14
24	28	76	Spencer Boyd	Freedom Racing Enterprises	Chevrolet	132	0	Running	13
25	22	91	Jack Wood	McAnally-Hilgemann Racing	Chevrolet	132	0	Running	12
26	2	15	Tanner Gray	Tricon Garage	Toyota	130	0	Running	11
27	31	33	Frankie Muniz (R)	Reaume Brothers Racing	Ford	126	0	Running	10
28	34	22	Mason Maggio (i)	Reaume Brothers Racing	Ford	123	0	Running	0
29	29	2	Cody Dennison	Reaume Brothers Racing	Ford	121	0	Running	8
30	25	5	Toni Breidinger (R)	Tricon Garage	Toyota	121	0	Running	7
31	17	26	Dawson Sutton (R)	Rackley W.A.R.	Chevrolet	104	0	Driveshaft	6
32	11	98	Ty Majeski	ThorSport Racing	Ford	103	0	Running	11
33	30	90	Justin Carroll	TC Motorsports	Toyota	75	0	Suspension	4
34	9	38	Chandler Smith	Front Row Motorsports	Ford	70	0	Accident	8
Official race results

== Standings after the race ==
Drivers' Championship standings

	Pos	Driver	Points
	1	Corey Heim	511
	2	Chandler Smith	411 (-100)
	3	Daniel Hemric	401 (–110)
	4	Tyler Ankrum	382 (–129)
	5	Grant Enfinger	371 (–140)
2	6	Layne Riggs	342 (–169)
2	7	Kaden Honeycutt	335 (–176)
1	8	Jake Garcia	332 (–179)
3	9	Ty Majeski	327 (–184)
	10	Stewart Friesen	291 (–220)
Official driver's standings

Manufacturers' Championship standings

Pos	Manufacturer	Points
1	Chevrolet	407
2	Toyota	387 (-20)
3	Ford	377 (–30)

- Note: Only the first 10 positions are included for the driver standings.

Previous race: 2025 Window World 250	NASCAR Craftsman Truck Series; 2025 season	Next race: 2025 Rackley Roofing 200
