= Logan Bearden =

American racing driver (born 1995)

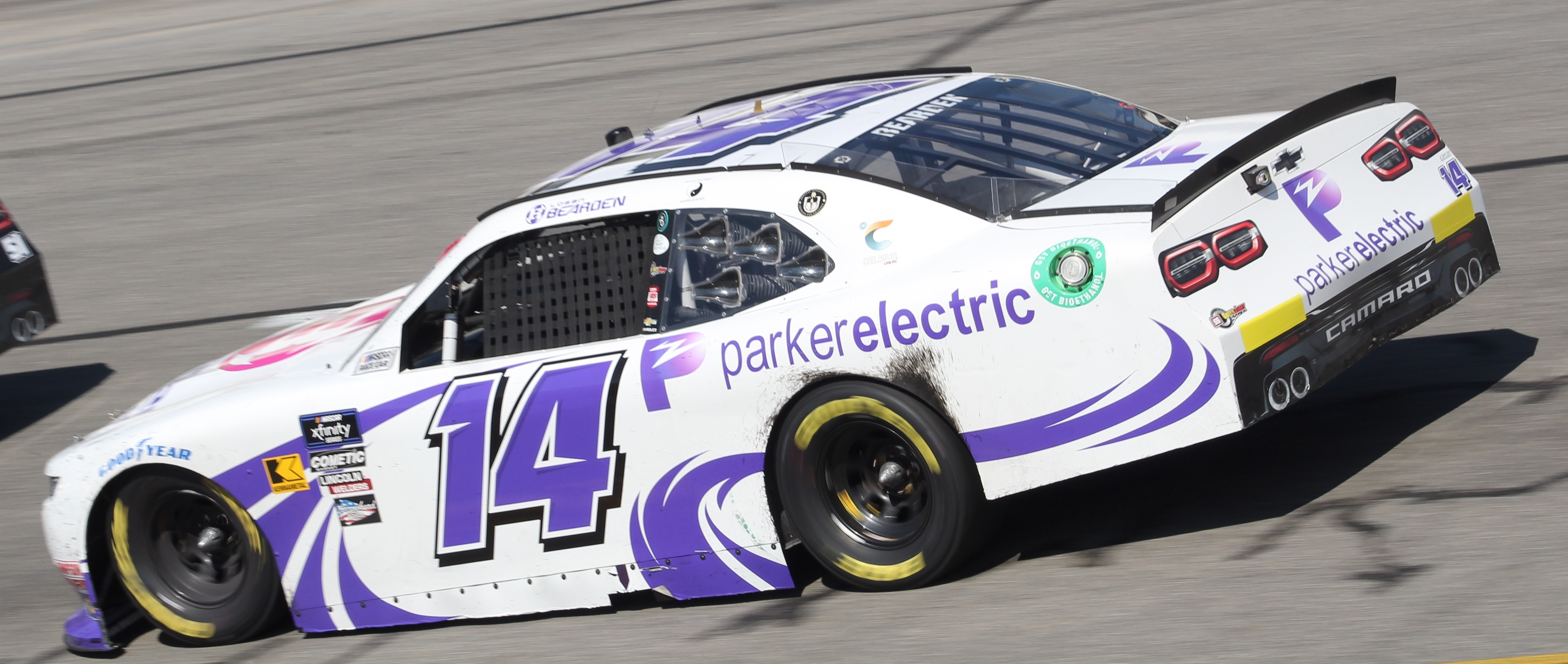
- Bearden's No. 14 car at Richmond Raceway in 2024
- Born: Logan Geariety Bearden; November 3, 1995 (age 31); Leander, Texas, U.S.

NASCAR O'Reilly Auto Parts Series career
- 18 races run over 3 years
- 2026 position: 47th
- Best finish: 45th (2024)
- First race: 2024 ToyotaCare 250 (Richmond)
- Last race: 2026 Food City 300 (Bristol)
Wins	Top tens	Poles
0	0	0

NASCAR FedEx Freight Truck Series career
- 4 races run over 3 years
- 2025 position: 102nd
- Best finish: 46th (2023)
- First race: 2022 XPEL 225 (COTA)
- Last race: 2025 Slim Jim 200 (Martinsville)
Wins	Top tens	Poles
0	0	0
- Statistics up to date as of November 7, 2026.

Logan Geariety Bearden (born November 3, 1995) is an American professional stock car racing driver. He last competed part-time in the NASCAR O'Reilly Auto Parts Series, driving the No. 42 Chevrolet Camaro SS for Young's Motorsports, and the No. 38 Ford Mustang Dark Horse for RSS Racing, and full-time in the NASCAR Euro Series, driving for Rette Jones Racing by Hendriks. He has previously competed in the NASCAR Craftsman Truck Series.

== Racing career ==
After growing up helping his father at local short tracks in Texas, Bearden began in kart racing. In 2007, he won the Oklahoma National Series championship and started competing in the World Karting Association's Manufacturers Cup. He eventually switched to pro modifieds, winning a rookie of the year award in 2013.

Bearden later moved to late models, with his first start in the SPEARS Southwest Tour Series coming at the Las Vegas Motor Speedway Bullring in 2017. In 2018, he entered the CARS Super Late Model Tour race at Fairgrounds Speedway, where he finished twelfth. Bearden has also competed in the Snowball Derby.

After skipping 2020, Bearden returned to racing in the SPEARS Southwest Tour Series in 2021. In May, he joined Niece Motorsports for his NASCAR Camping World Truck Series debut at Circuit of the Americas. However, he was one of seven drivers who failed to qualify for the race.

A year later, Bearden drove for AM Racing in the 2022 XPEL 225, which he finally managed to qualify for.

== Personal life ==
Bearden was diagnosed with dyslexia in second grade.

== Motorsports career results ==
=== NASCAR ===
(key) (Bold – Pole position awarded by qualifying time. Italics – Pole position earned by points standings or practice time. * – Most laps led.)

==== O'Reilly Auto Parts Series ====
NASCAR O'Reilly Auto Parts Series results
Year	Team	No.	Make	1	2	3	4	5	6	7	8	9	10	11	12	13	14	15	16	17	18	19	20	21	22	23	24	25	26	27	28	29	30	31	32	33	NOAPSC	Pts	Ref
2024	SS-Green Light Racing	14	Chevy	DAY	ATL	LVS	PHO	COA	RCH; 22	MAR; 30	TEX	TAL	DOV	DAR	CLT																						45th	65	
2024	SS-Green Light Racing	07	Chevy													PIR; 29	SON	IOW	NHA																		45th	65	
2024	Joey Gase Motorsports	35	Chevy																	NSH; 32	CSC	POC	IND														45th	65	
2024	SS-Green Light Racing	14	Ford																					MCH; 25	DAY	DAR	ATL	GLN									45th	65	
2024	AM Racing	15	Ford																										BRI; 27	KAN; 33	TAL	ROV	LVS	HOM			45th	65	
2024	Mike Harmon Racing	74	Chevy																																MAR; 34	PHO	45th	65	
2025	SS-Green Light Racing with BRK Racing	14	Chevy	DAY	ATL	COA	PHO	LVS	HOM	MAR	DAR	BRI	CAR	TAL	TEX	CLT	NSH; 23	MXC												BRI; 30	KAN	ROV	LVS	TAL	MAR	PHO	52nd	32	
2025	Joey Gase Motorsports with Scott Osteen	53	Chevy																POC; 27	ATL	CSC	SON	DOV														52nd	32	
2025	SS-Green Light Racing	07	Chevy																					IND; 38	IOW	GLN	DAY	PIR	GTW								52nd	32	
2026	Young's Motorsports	42	Chevy	DAY	ATL	COA	PHO	LVS	DAR	MAR	CAR	BRI; 33	KAN	TAL	TEX	GLN			NSH; 26	POC	COR	SON	CHI					DAR; 28	GTW	BRI; 18	LVS	CLT	PHO	TAL	MAR	HOM	47th	47	
2026	RSS Racing	38	Ford														DOV; 35	CLT						ATL; 35	IND	IOW	DAY										47th	47	

==== Craftsman Truck Series ====
NASCAR Craftsman Truck Series results
Year	Team	No.	Make	1	2	3	4	5	6	7	8	9	10	11	12	13	14	15	16	17	18	19	20	21	22	23	24	25	NCTC	Pts	Ref
2021	Niece Motorsports	44	Chevy	DAY	DRC	LVS	ATL	BRD	RCH	KAN	DAR	COA; DNQ	CLT	TEX	NSH	POC	KNX	GLN	GTW	DAR	BRI	LVS	TAL	MAR	PHO				121st	–	
2022	AM Racing	37	Chevy	DAY	LVS	ATL	COA; 28	MAR	BRD	DAR	KAN	TEX	CLT	GTW	SON	KNX	NSH	MOH	POC	IRP	RCH	KAN	BRI	TAL	HOM	PHO			67th	9	
2023	AM Racing	22	Ford	DAY	LVS	ATL	COA; 22	TEX	BRD	MAR	KAN	DAR	NWS	CLT	GTW	NSH	MOH	POC	RCH	IRP; 21	MLW	KAN	BRI	TAL	HOM	PHO			46th	31	
2025	Young's Motorsports	02	Chevy	DAY	ATL	LVS	HOM	MAR	BRI	CAR	TEX	KAN	NWS	CLT	NSH	MCH	POC	LRP	IRP	GLN	RCH	DAR	BRI	NHA	ROV	TAL	MAR; 25	PHO	102nd	0^{1}	

^{*} Season still in progress
^{1} Ineligible for series points

=== CARS Super Late Model Tour ===
(key)

CARS Super Late Model Tour results
Year	Team	No.	Make	1	2	3	4	5	6	7	8	9	CSLMTC	Pts	Ref
2018	N/A	66B	Chevy	MYB	NSH; 12	ROU	HCY	BRI	AND	HCY	ROU	SBO	N/A	0	

=== ASA STARS National Tour ===
(key) (Bold – Pole position awarded by qualifying time. Italics – Pole position earned by points standings or practice time. * – Most laps led. ** – All laps led.)

ASA STARS National Tour results
Year	Team	No.	Make	1	2	3	4	5	6	7	8	9	10	11	12	ASNTC	Pts	Ref
2023	Bearden Motorsports	66	Ford	FIF	MAD	NWS	HCY	MLW	AND; 17	WIR	TOL; 10		NSV; 9			18th	179	
2023	Bearden Motorsports	66	Chevy									WIN; 6				18th	179	
2024	Bearden Motorsports	66	Ford	NSM	FIF	HCY	MAD	MLW	AND	OWO	TOL	WIN; 16	NSV			67th	36	
2025	Bearden Motorsports	66	Ford	NSM	FIF	DOM	HCY	NPS	MAD	SLG	AND	OWO	TOL	WIN; 19	NSV	64th	33	
