= 2024 Dude Wipes 250 =

7th race of the 2024 NASCAR Xfinity Series

Race details
- Race 7 of 33 of the 2024 NASCAR Xfinity Series
- Date: April 6, 2024
- Official name: 17th Annual Dude Wipes 250
- Location: Martinsville Speedway in Ridgeway, Virginia
- Course: Permanent racing facility
- Course length: 0.526 miles (0.847 km)
- Distance: 251 laps, 132 mi (212 km)
- Scheduled distance: 250 laps, 131 mi (211 km)
- Average speed: 61.984 mph (99.754 km/h)

Pole position
Driver	Brandon Jones	JR Motorsports
- Time: 19.694

Most laps led
Driver	Aric Almirola	Joe Gibbs Racing
- Laps: 148

Winner
No. 20	Aric Almirola	Joe Gibbs Racing

Television in the United States
- Network: FS1
- Announcers: Adam Alexander, Austin Cindric, and Ryan Blaney

Radio in the United States
- Radio: MRN

The 2024 Dude Wipes 250 was the 7th stock car race of the 2024 NASCAR Xfinity Series, and the 17th iteration of the event. The race was held on Saturday, April 6, 2024, at Martinsville Speedway in Ridgeway, Virginia, a 0.526 miles (0.847 km) permanent asphalt paperclip-shaped short track. The race was originally scheduled to be contested over 250 laps, but was increased to 251 laps due to a NASCAR overtime finish. In a wild and action packed race that saw numerous spins and wrecks, Aric Almirola, driving for Joe Gibbs Racing, would survive a chaotic overtime restart, and won the race after a multi-car incident occurred on the final lap with him in the lead. This was Almirola's fifth career NASCAR Xfinity Series win, and his first of the season. Almirola was the most consistent driver of the race, winning the first stage and leading a race-high 148 laps. To fill out the podium, Sam Mayer, driving for JR Motorsports, and Chandler Smith, driving for Joe Gibbs Racing, would finish 2nd and 3rd, respectively.

This was also the first race of the Dash 4 Cash. Drivers eligible for the Dash 4 Cash were Chandler Smith, Aric Almirola, Jesse Love, and Parker Kligerman, since they were the highest finishing Xfinity regulars following the race at Richmond. Almirola would claim the bonus cash after winning the race.

== Report ==
=== Background ===
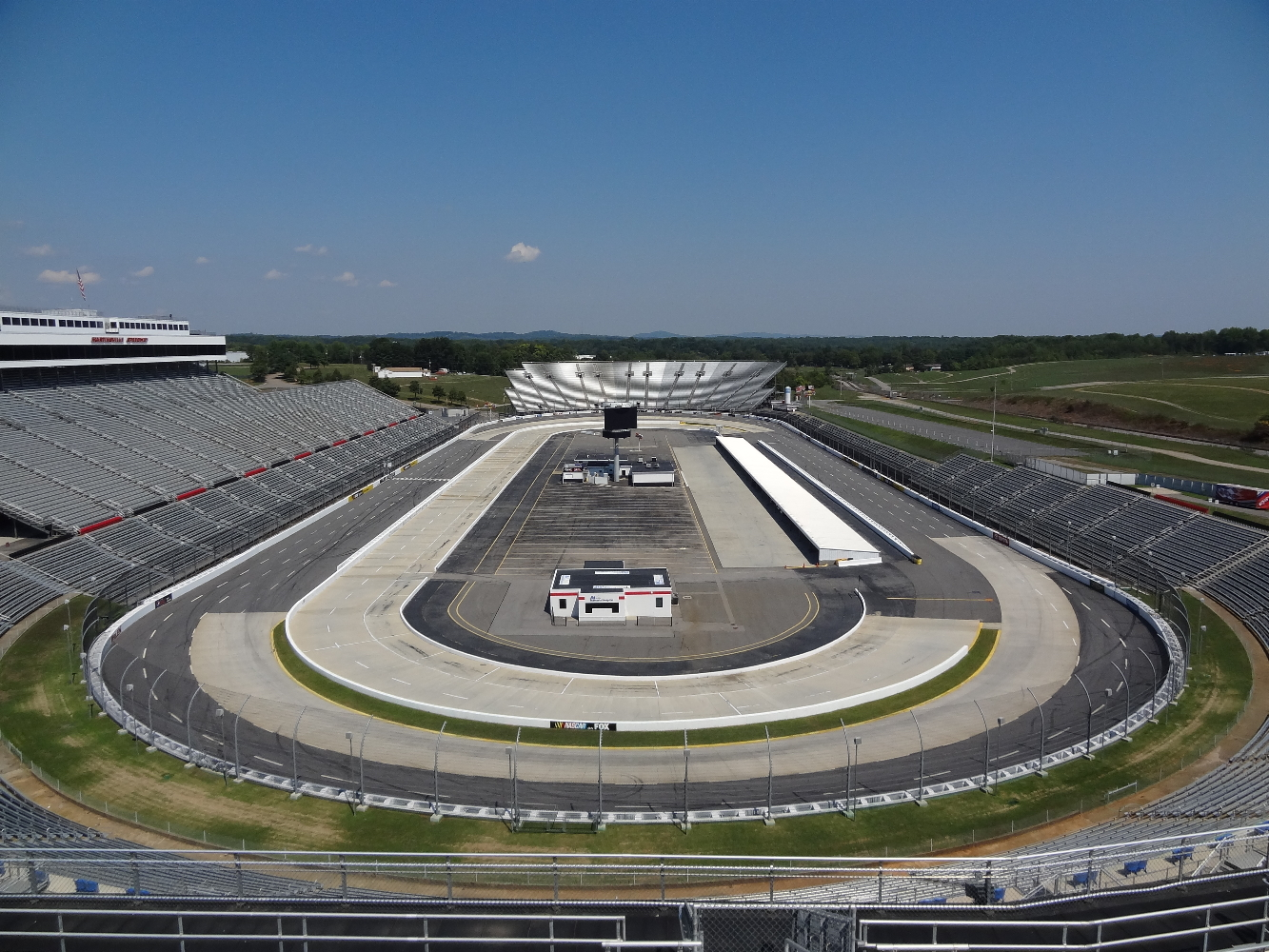
Martinsville Speedway, the circuit where the race was held

Martinsville Speedway is a NASCAR-owned stock car racing track located in Henry County, in Ridgeway, Virginia, just to the south of Martinsville. At 0.526 miles (0.847 km) in length, it is the shortest track in the NASCAR Cup Series. The track was also one of the first paved oval tracks in NASCAR, being built in 1947 by H. Clay Earles. It is also the only remaining race track on the NASCAR circuit since its beginning in 1948.

==== Entry list ====
- (R) denotes rookie driver.
- (i) denotes driver who is ineligible for series driver points.

#	Driver	Team	Make
00	Cole Custer	Stewart–Haas Racing	Ford
1	Sam Mayer	JR Motorsports	Chevrolet
2	Jesse Love (R)	Richard Childress Racing	Chevrolet
4	Dawson Cram (R)	JD Motorsports	Chevrolet
5	Anthony Alfredo	Our Motorsports	Chevrolet
6	Garrett Smithley	JD Motorsports	Chevrolet
07	Myatt Snider	SS-Green Light Racing	Chevrolet
7	Justin Allgaier	JR Motorsports	Chevrolet
8	Sammy Smith	JR Motorsports	Chevrolet
9	Brandon Jones	JR Motorsports	Chevrolet
11	Josh Williams	Kaulig Racing	Chevrolet
14	Logan Bearden	SS-Green Light Racing	Chevrolet
15	Hailie Deegan (R)	AM Racing	Ford
16	A. J. Allmendinger	Kaulig Racing	Chevrolet
18	Sheldon Creed	Joe Gibbs Racing	Toyota
19	Taylor Gray (i)	Joe Gibbs Racing	Toyota
20	Aric Almirola	Joe Gibbs Racing	Toyota
21	Austin Hill	Richard Childress Racing	Chevrolet
26	Corey Heim (i)	Sam Hunt Racing	Toyota
27	Jeb Burton	Jordan Anderson Racing	Chevrolet
28	Kyle Sieg	RSS Racing	Ford
29	Blaine Perkins	RSS Racing	Ford
31	Parker Retzlaff	Jordan Anderson Racing	Chevrolet
35	Akinori Ogata	Joey Gase Motorsports	Toyota
38	Matt DiBenedetto	RSS Racing	Ford
39	Ryan Sieg	RSS Racing	Ford
42	Leland Honeyman (R)	Young's Motorsports	Chevrolet
43	Ryan Ellis	Alpha Prime Racing	Chevrolet
44	Brennan Poole	Alpha Prime Racing	Chevrolet
48	Parker Kligerman	Big Machine Racing	Chevrolet
51	Jeremy Clements	Jeremy Clements Racing	Chevrolet
53	Joey Gase	Joey Gase Motorsports	Ford
74	Ryan Vargas	Mike Harmon Racing	Chevrolet
81	Chandler Smith	Joe Gibbs Racing	Toyota
88	Carson Kvapil	JR Motorsports	Chevrolet
91	Kyle Weatherman	DGM Racing	Chevrolet
92	Dexter Bean	DGM Racing	Chevrolet
97	Shane van Gisbergen (R)	Kaulig Racing	Chevrolet
98	Riley Herbst	Stewart–Haas Racing	Ford
Official entry list

== Practice ==
Practice was held on Friday, April 5, at 5:05 PM EST. Since Martinsville Speedway is a short track, drivers will be split into two groups, Group A and B, with both sessions being 15 minutes long. A. J. Allmendinger, driving for Kaulig Racing, was the fastest driver between both groups, with a lap of 20.172, and a speed of 93.873 mph (151.074 km/h).

Pos.	#	Driver	Team	Make	Time	Speed
1	16	A. J. Allmendinger	Kaulig Racing	Chevrolet	20.172	93.873
2	31	Parker Retzlaff	Jordan Anderson Racing	Chevrolet	20.294	93.308
3	8	Sammy Smith	JR Motorsports	Chevrolet	20.306	93.252
Full practice results

== Qualifying ==
Qualifying was held on Friday, April 5, at 5:40 PM EST. Since Martinsville Speedway is a short track, the qualifying system used is a single-car, two-lap system with only one round. Drivers will be on track by themselves and will have two laps to post a qualifying time. Whoever sets the fastest time in that round will win the pole.

Brandon Jones, driving for JR Motorsports, would score the pole for the race, with a lap of 19.694, and a speed of 96.151 mph (154.740 km/h).

Ryan Vargas was the only driver who failed to qualify.

=== Qualifying results ===
Pos.	#	Driver	Team	Make	Time	Speed
1	9	Brandon Jones	JR Motorsports	Chevrolet	19.694	96.151
2	00	Cole Custer	Stewart–Haas Racing	Ford	19.757	95.845
3	18	Sheldon Creed	Joe Gibbs Racing	Toyota	19.758	95.840
4	27	Jeb Burton	Jordan Anderson Racing	Chevrolet	19.794	95.665
5	7	Justin Allgaier	JR Motorsports	Chevrolet	19.796	95.656
6	20	Aric Almirola	Joe Gibbs Racing	Toyota	19.802	95.627
7	5	Anthony Alfredo	Our Motorsports	Chevrolet	19.807	95.603
8	39	Ryan Sieg	RSS Racing	Ford	19.832	95.482
9	1	Sam Mayer	JR Motorsports	Chevrolet	19.834	95.472
10	21	Austin Hill	Richard Childress Racing	Chevrolet	19.855	95.371
11	2	Jesse Love (R)	Richard Childress Racing	Chevrolet	19.862	95.338
12	88	Carson Kvapil	JR Motorsports	Chevrolet	19.874	95.280
13	31	Parker Retzlaff	Jordan Anderson Racing	Chevrolet	19.897	95.170
14	38	Matt DiBenedetto	RSS Racing	Ford	19.905	95.132
15	16	A. J. Allmendinger	Kaulig Racing	Chevrolet	19.938	94.974
16	19	Taylor Gray (i)	Joe Gibbs Racing	Toyota	19.938	94.974
17	8	Sammy Smith	JR Motorsports	Chevrolet	19.939	94.970
18	48	Parker Kligerman	Big Machine Racing	Chevrolet	19.960	94.870
19	97	Shane van Gisbergen (R)	Kaulig Racing	Chevrolet	19.997	94.694
20	26	Corey Heim (i)	Sam Hunt Racing	Toyota	20.012	94.623
21	51	Jeremy Clements	Jeremy Clements Racing	Chevrolet	20.037	94.505
22	98	Riley Herbst	Stewart–Haas Racing	Ford	20.039	94.496
23	11	Josh Williams	Kaulig Racing	Chevrolet	20.040	94.491
24	44	Brennan Poole	Alpha Prime Racing	Chevrolet	20.049	94.449
25	42	Leland Honeyman (R)	Young's Motorsports	Chevrolet	20.084	94.284
26	91	Kyle Weatherman	DGM Racing	Chevrolet	20.110	94.162
27	15	Hailie Deegan (R)	AM Racing	Ford	20.122	94.106
28	28	Kyle Sieg	RSS Racing	Ford	20.129	94.073
29	43	Ryan Ellis	Alpha Prime Racing	Chevrolet	20.139	94.027
30	29	Blaine Perkins	RSS Racing	Ford	20.148	93.985
31	6	Garrett Smithley	JD Motorsports	Chevrolet	20.210	93.696
32	4	Dawson Cram (R)	JD Motorsports	Chevrolet	20.232	93.594
33	92	Dexter Bean	DGM Racing	Chevrolet	20.348	93.061
Qualified by owner's points
34	07	Myatt Snider	SS-Green Light Racing	Chevrolet	20.434	92.669
35	14	Logan Bearden	SS-Green Light Racing	Chevrolet	20.649	91.704
36	53	Joey Gase	Joey Gase Motorsports	Ford	20.653	91.686
37	81	Chandler Smith	Joe Gibbs Racing	Toyota	–	–
38	35	Akinori Ogata	Joey Gase Motorsports	Toyota	–	–
Failed to qualify
39	74	Ryan Vargas	Mike Harmon Racing	Chevrolet	20.675	91.589
Official qualifying results
Official starting lineup

== Race results ==
Stage 1 Laps: 60

Pos.	#	Driver	Team	Make	Pts
1	20	Aric Almirola	Joe Gibbs Racing	Toyota	10
2	18	Sheldon Creed	Joe Gibbs Racing	Toyota	9
3	00	Cole Custer	Stewart-Haas Racing	Ford	8
4	1	Sam Mayer	JR Motorsports	Chevrolet	7
5	16	A. J. Allmendinger	Kaulig Racing	Chevrolet	6
6	5	Anthony Alfredo	Our Motorsports	Chevrolet	5
7	39	Ryan Sieg	RSS Racing	Ford	4
8	21	Austin Hill	Richard Childress Racing	Chevrolet	3
9	27	Jeb Burton	Jordan Anderson Racing	Chevrolet	2
10	31	Parker Retzlaff	Jordan Anderson Racing	Chevrolet	1

Stage 2 Laps: 60

Pos.	#	Driver	Team	Make	Pts
1	7	Justin Allgaier	JR Motorsports	Chevrolet	10
2	20	Aric Almirola	Joe Gibbs Racing	Toyota	9
3	8	Sammy Smith	JR Motorsports	Chevrolet	8
4	88	Carson Kvapil	JR Motorsports	Chevrolet	7
5	00	Cole Custer	Stewart-Haas Racing	Ford	6
6	18	Sheldon Creed	Joe Gibbs Racing	Toyota	5
7	9	Brandon Jones	JR Motorsports	Chevrolet	4
8	81	Chandler Smith	Joe Gibbs Racing	Toyota	3
9	27	Jeb Burton	Jordan Anderson Racing	Chevrolet	2
10	39	Ryan Sieg	RSS Racing	Ford	1

Stage 3 Laps: 131

Fin	St	#	Driver	Team	Make	Laps	Led	Status	Pts
1	6	20	Aric Almirola	Joe Gibbs Racing	Toyota	251	148	Running	59
2	9	1	Sam Mayer	JR Motorsports	Chevrolet	251	11	Running	42
3	37	81	Chandler Smith	Joe Gibbs Racing	Toyota	251	3	Running	37
4	12	88	Carson Kvapil	JR Motorsports	Chevrolet	251	0	Running	40
5	5	7	Justin Allgaier	JR Motorsports	Chevrolet	251	14	Running	42
6	3	18	Sheldon Creed	Joe Gibbs Racing	Toyota	251	0	Running	45
7	17	8	Sammy Smith	JR Motorsports	Chevrolet	251	42	Running	38
8	2	00	Cole Custer	Stewart–Haas Racing	Ford	251	27	Running	43
9	11	2	Jesse Love (R)	Richard Childress Racing	Chevrolet	251	0	Running	28
10	23	11	Josh Williams	Kaulig Racing	Chevrolet	251	0	Running	27
11	19	97	Shane van Gisbergen (R)	Kaulig Racing	Chevrolet	251	0	Running	26
12	18	48	Parker Kligerman	Big Machine Racing	Chevrolet	251	5	Running	25
13	16	19	Taylor Gray (i)	Joe Gibbs Racing	Toyota	251	0	Running	0
14	24	44	Brennan Poole	Alpha Prime Racing	Chevrolet	251	0	Running	23
15	7	5	Anthony Alfredo	Our Motorsports	Chevrolet	251	0	Running	27
16	30	29	Blaine Perkins	RSS Racing	Ford	251	0	Running	21
17	8	39	Ryan Sieg	RSS Racing	Ford	251	0	Running	25
18	27	15	Hailie Deegan (R)	AM Racing	Ford	251	0	Running	19
19	34	07	Myatt Snider	SS-Green Light Racing	Chevrolet	251	0	Running	18
20	33	92	Dexter Bean	DGM Racing	Chevrolet	251	0	Running	17
21	14	38	Matt DiBenedetto	RSS Racing	Ford	251	0	Running	16
22	21	51	Jeremy Clements	Jeremy Clements Racing	Chevrolet	251	0	Running	15
23	28	28	Kyle Sieg	RSS Racing	Ford	251	0	Running	14
24	32	4	Dawson Cram (R)	JD Motorsports	Chevrolet	251	0	Running	13
25	22	98	Riley Herbst	Stewart–Haas Racing	Ford	250	0	Accident	12
26	29	43	Ryan Ellis	Alpha Prime Racing	Chevrolet	250	0	Accident	11
27	1	9	Brandon Jones	JR Motorsports	Chevrolet	250	0	Accident	14
28	36	53	Joey Gase	Joey Gase Motorsports	Ford	250	1	Running	9
29	31	6	Garrett Smithley	JD Motorsports	Chevrolet	249	0	Running	8
30	35	14	Logan Bearden	SS-Green Light Racing	Chevrolet	247	0	Running	7
31	25	42	Leland Honeyman (R)	Young's Motorsports	Chevrolet	244	0	Running	6
32	4	27	Jeb Burton	Jordan Anderson Racing	Chevrolet	242	0	Accident	9
33	26	91	Kyle Weatherman	DGM Racing	Chevrolet	75	0	Accident	4
34	10	21	Austin Hill	Richard Childress Racing	Chevrolet	71	0	Accident	6
35	20	26	Corey Heim (i)	Sam Hunt Racing	Toyota	70	0	Accident	0
36	15	16	A. J. Allmendinger	Kaulig Racing	Chevrolet	70	0	Accident	7
37	13	31	Parker Retzlaff	Jordan Anderson Racing	Chevrolet	70	0	Accident	2
38	38	35	Akinori Ogata	Joey Gase Motorsports	Toyota	41	0	Brakes	1
Official race results

== Standings after the race ==
Drivers' Championship standings

	Pos	Driver	Points
	1	Chandler Smith	302
1	2	Cole Custer	267 (-35)
1	3	Austin Hill	261 (–41)
	4	Jesse Love	226 (–76)
2	5	Justin Allgaier	223 (–79)
1	6	Riley Herbst	206 (–96)
1	7	Parker Kligerman	202 (–100)
2	8	A. J. Allmendinger	192 (–110)
	9	Sammy Smith	191 (–111)
1	10	Sheldon Creed	182 (–120)
8	11	Aric Almirola	160 (–142)
	12	Anthony Alfredo	158 (–144)
Official driver's standings

Manufacturers' Championship standings

Pos	Manufacturer	Points
1	Chevrolet	255
2	Toyota	254 (–1)
3	Ford	210 (–45)

- Note: Only the first 12 positions are included for the driver standings.

Previous race: 2024 ToyotaCare 250	NASCAR Xfinity Series; 2024 season	Next race: 2024 Andy's Frozen Custard 300
