= Dawson Cram =

American racing driver (born 2001)

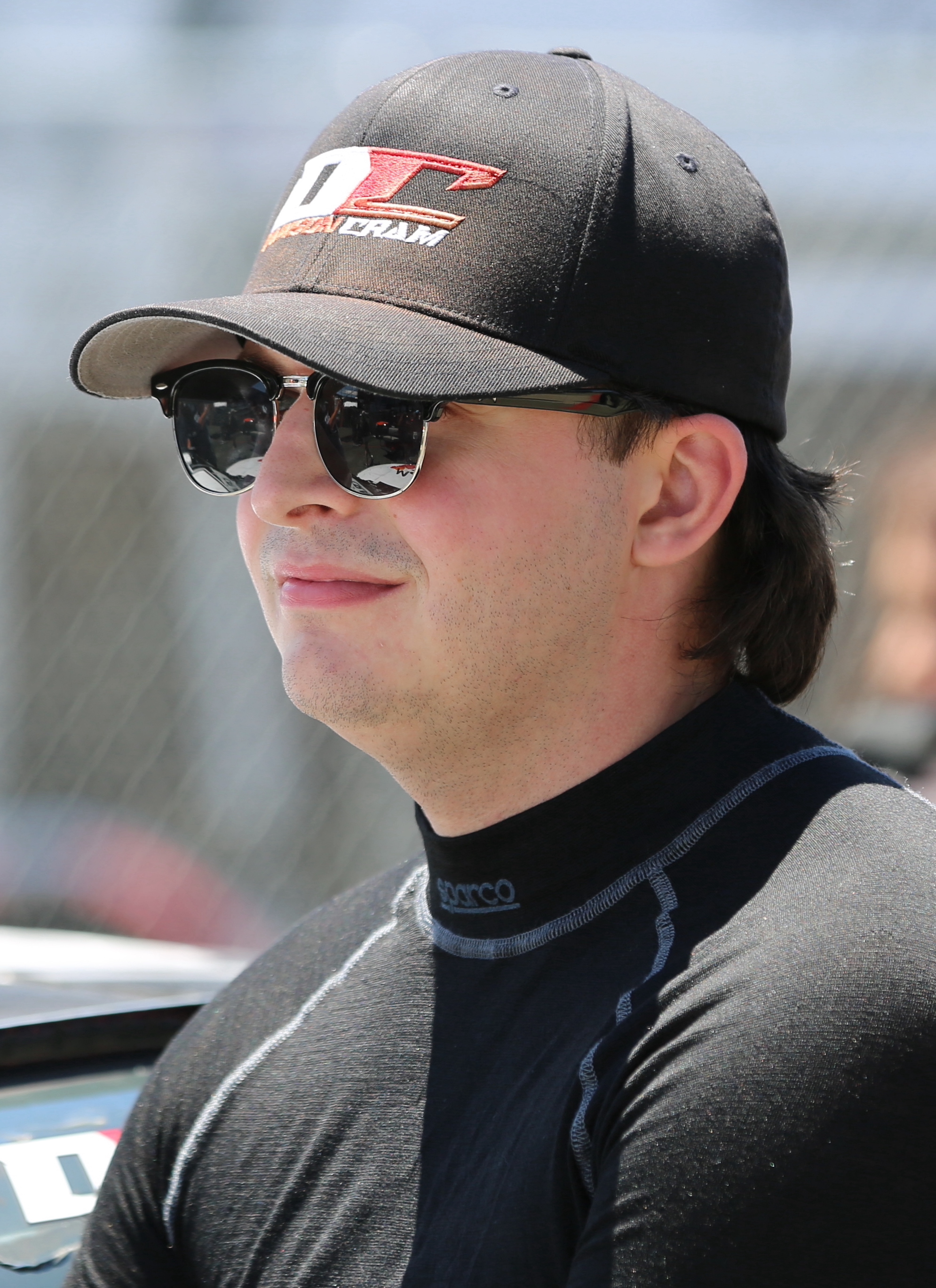
- Cram at Sonoma Raceway in 2026
- Born: Dawson Kevin Cram; September 12, 2001 (age 25); Ballantyne, North Carolina, U.S.

NASCAR O'Reilly Auto Parts Series career
- 57 races run over 6 years
- 2026 position: 41st
- Best finish: 41st (2026)
- First race: 2021 Ambetter Get Vaccinated 200 (New Hampshire)
- Last race: 2026 O'Reilly Auto Parts 300 (Homestead)
Wins	Top tens	Poles
0	0	0

NASCAR FedEx Freight Truck Series career
- 33 races run over 7 years
- 2025 position: 105th
- Best finish: 30th (2021)
- First race: 2018 Alpha Energy Solutions 250 (Martinsville)
- Last race: 2025 MillerTech Battery 200 (Pocono)
Wins	Top tens	Poles
0	0	0

ARCA Menards Series career
- 1 race run over 1 year
- Best finish: 62nd (2020)
- First race: 2020 General Tire 150 (Phoenix)
Wins	Top tens	Poles
0	0	0
- Statistics up to date as of November 7, 2026.

Dawson Kevin Cram (born September 12, 2001) is an American professional stock car racing driver, mechanic, and team owner. He last competed part-time in the NASCAR O'Reilly Auto Parts Series, driving the No. 74 Chevrolet SS for Mike Harmon Racing, the No. 35 Chevrolet SS for Joey Gase Motorsports with Scott Osteen, and the No. 47 Chevrolet SS for Team Stange Racing with MHR. He has previously competed in the NASCAR Craftsman Truck Series and the ARCA Menards Series.

From 2017 to 2021, Cram ran for his own race team that he co-owned with his family, being the youngest team owner in NASCAR history at only the age of 16.

== Racing career ==
=== Early career ===
In 2007, at the age of five, Cram started racing in Mini Dwarf race cars in his hometown, San Diego, California. He later moved to Mooresville, North Carolina and started to race in the INEX Bandolero Series. After winning thirteen times in Bandoleros, he made the move to legend cars in 2014. His racing slate in 2017 included various starts in legends cars, Super Trucks, and late models in the Whelen All-American Series and an attempt at a NASCAR Camping World Truck Series event.

=== NASCAR ===
On October 24, 2017, Cram was announced to be driving for Cram Racing Enterprises in the No. 11 truck at Martinsville Speedway in the 2017 Texas Roadhouse 200. A blown engine during practice ended the team's weekend, forcing the No. 11 team and Cram to withdraw.

Cram returned to Martinsville in the spring of 2018, driving for Beaver Motorsports. In his first race with live pit stops, Cram accidentally hit a crew member on his first pit stop and climbed to a seventeenth place finish on the lead lap. Cram's third attempt was also at Martinsville; this time it was a joint effort between his family Cram Racing Enterprises and Copp Motorsports. He finished 24th and also ran the next race on the schedule at ISM Raceway in the No. 83.

In 2020, Cram served as a mechanic for the No. 6 NASCAR Xfinity Series team of JD Motorsports. He also ran Truck races for Long Motorsports and Reaume Brothers Racing. Cram left Long Motorsports in August for financial reasons, but later purchased the team and ran the No. 41 under the Cram Racing Enterprises banner for the rest of the 2020 Truck season.

Ahead of the 2021 Truck season, Cram voiced his plans to run the full schedule. In July, he joined Mike Harmon Racing for his NASCAR Xfinity Series debut at New Hampshire Motor Speedway.

In 2022, Cram announced that he would attempt the Xfinity Series' September Darlington race, driving the No. 35 car for Emerling-Gase Motorsports. He qualified for the race and finished 30th. He would also attempt to qualify for two races in the Mike Harmon Racing No. 47 car but failed to qualify. He also drove the MBM Motorsports No. 13 in the season-finale at Phoenix, which he did qualify for, and finished 31st.

In 2023, Cram would run the majority of the Xfinity Series season in the No. 74 car for CHK Racing (formerly Mike Harmon Racing). However, he and the team would fail to qualify for the majority of the races they attempted. After one of the races that they did qualify for, Charlotte in May, Cram and the team lost 10 driver and owner points due to the car having an air duct violation. He became one of the few drivers in NASCAR history to have a negative point total in the standings at some point in a season. (Michael Waltrip in 2007 in the Cup Series is another example after he was penalized during Daytona 500 Speedweeks that year.) He would also drive the SS-Green Light Racing No. 07 car at Martinsville in April and the Alpha Prime Racing No. 44 car at Darlington in September. He would also drive the G2G Racing No. 47 in the Truck Series race at Darlington in May. His team would later be penalized with the loss of 25 owner points for having an outdated window net in that race.

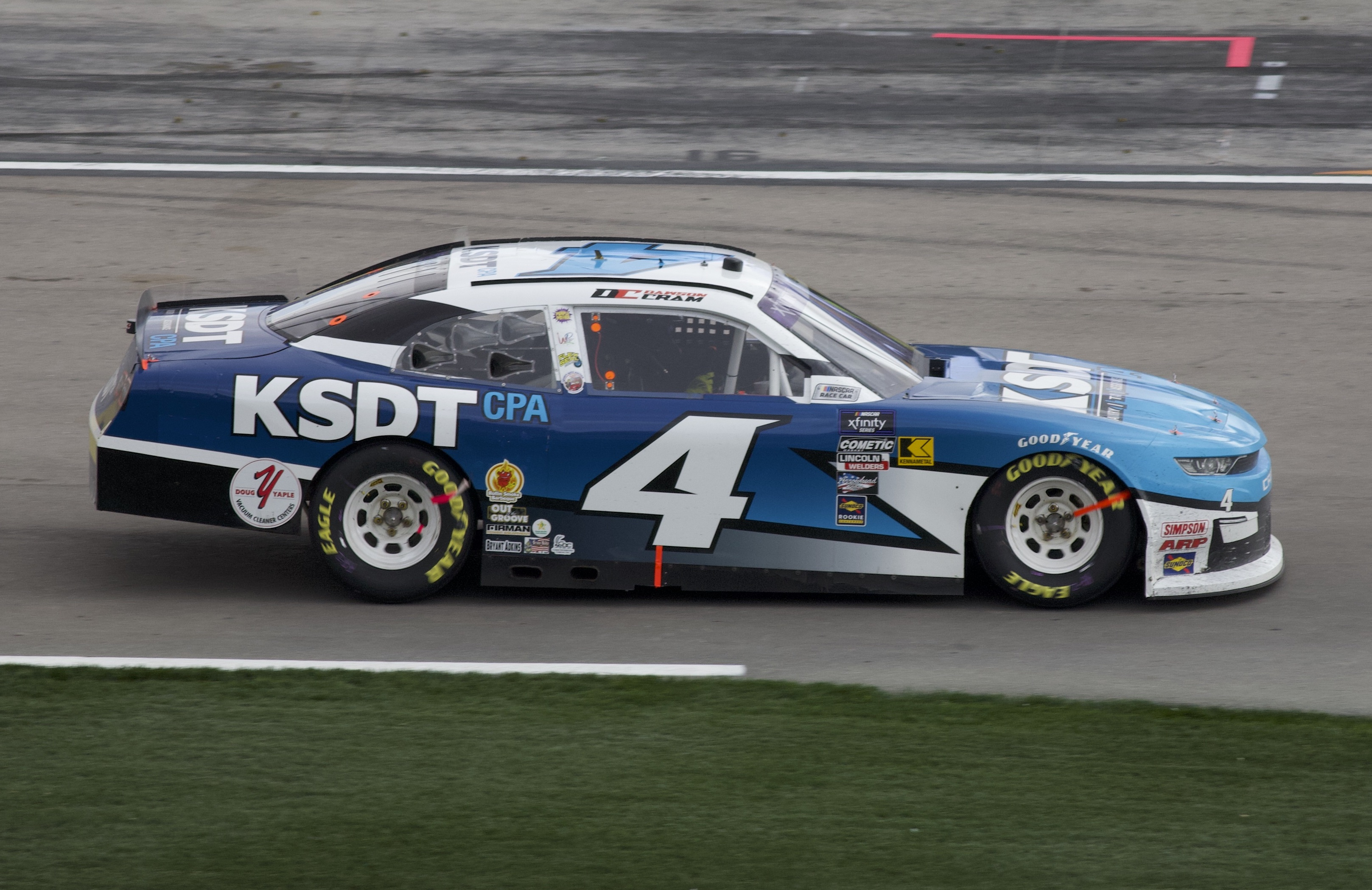
Cram's No. 4 car at Las Vegas Motor Speedway in 2024.

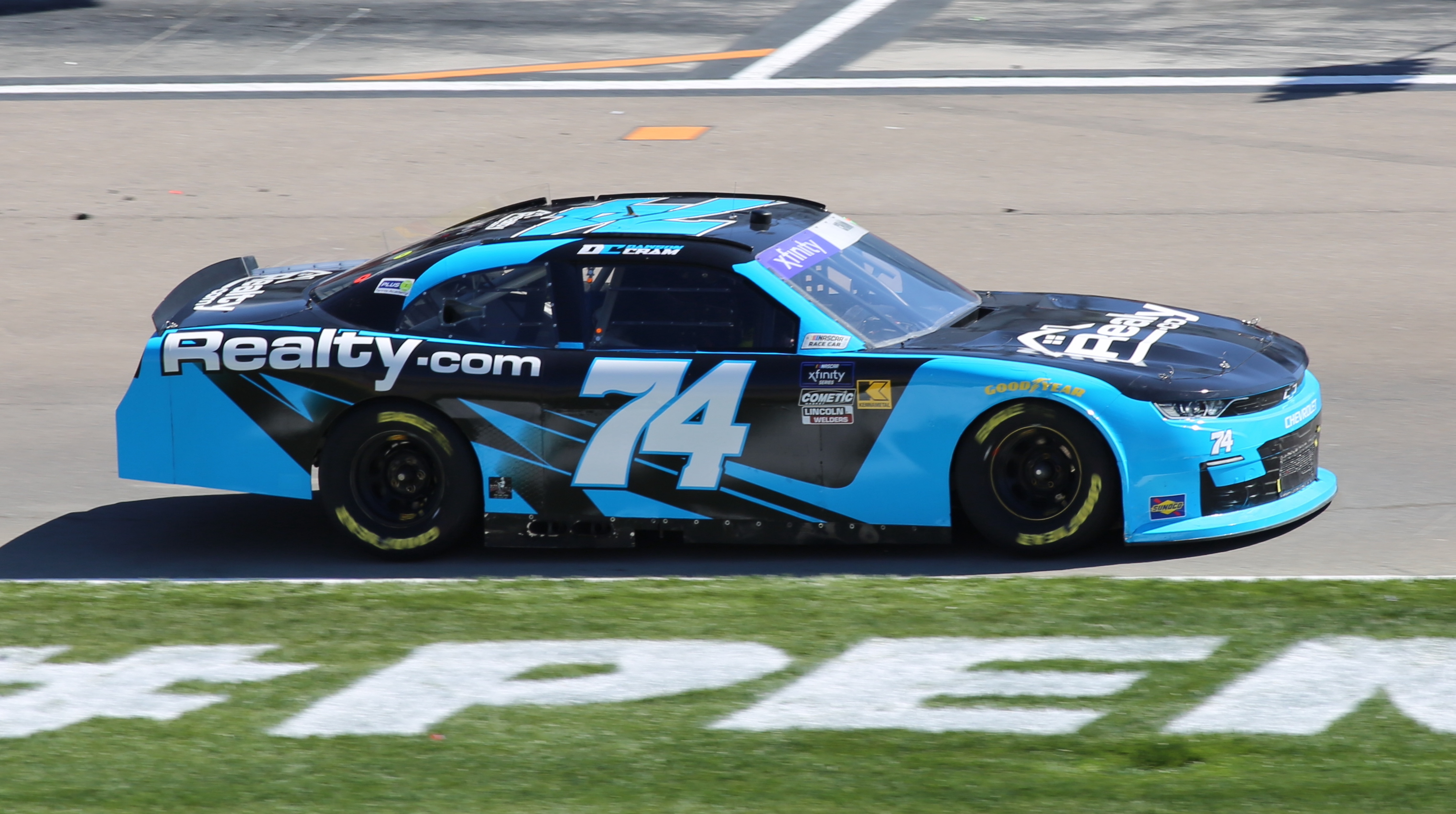
Cram's No. 74 car at Las Vegas Motor Speedway in 2025

On December 6, 2023, it was announced that Cram will run full-time in the Xfinity Series in 2024, driving the No. 4 car for JD Motorsports. After four races, Cram would be scaled back to a part-time schedule. In July 2024, it was reported that back in April 2024, JD Motorsports had filed for Chapter 11 Bankruptcy and laid off several of their employees. Starting at Pocono, Cram would return to Mike Harmon Racing in their No. 74 car and would qualify for the race after his original team, JD Motorsports withdrew their No. 6 entry. This would be the first race that MHR had qualified for all year. Cram would crash on Lap 1 and would finish the race in 38th. At Darlington, he would be back in the No. 74 but would fail to qualify. The next week at Atlanta, he would qualify for the race but would retire after 18 laps due to engine troubles. He would once again fail to qualify at Bristol. On September 10, it was announced that Cram would drive for DGM Racing in their No. 92 entry for five races starting at Kansas.

== Personal life ==
Cram's father, Kevin Cram, is a former crew chief in all three NASCAR national series, and his uncle Clinton Cram is still in the profession, crew chiefing Dawson's first Truck attempt.

== Motorsports career results ==
=== NASCAR ===
(key) (Bold – Pole position awarded by qualifying time. Italics – Pole position earned by points standings or practice time. * – Most laps led.)

==== O'Reilly Auto Parts Series ====
NASCAR O'Reilly Auto Parts Series results
Year	Team	No.	Make	1	2	3	4	5	6	7	8	9	10	11	12	13	14	15	16	17	18	19	20	21	22	23	24	25	26	27	28	29	30	31	32	33	NOAPSC	Pts	Ref
2021	Mike Harmon Racing	74	Chevy	DAY	DRC	HOM	LVS	PHO	ATL	MAR	TAL	DAR	DOV	COA	CLT	MOH	TEX	NSH	POC	ROA	ATL	NHA; 35	GLN	IRC	MCH	DAY	DAR	RCH	BRI	LVS	TAL	ROV	TEX	KAN	MAR	PHO	102nd	0^{1}	
2022	Emerling-Gase Motorsports	35	Ford	DAY	CAL	LVS	PHO	ATL	COA	RCH	MAR	TAL	DOV	DAR	TEX	CLT	PIR	NSH	ROA	ATL	NHA	POC	IRC	MCH	GLN	DAY	DAR; 30	KAN									64th	13	
2022	Mike Harmon Racing	47	Chevy																										BRI; DNQ	TEX	TAL	ROV	LVS	HOM	MAR; DNQ		64th	13	
2022	MBM Motorsports	13	Ford																																	PHO; 31	64th	13	
2023	CHK Racing	74	Chevy	DAY	CAL	LVS	PHO; 38	ATL; DNQ	COA	RCH; DNQ			DOV; DNQ	DAR; DNQ	CLT; 36	PIR	SON	NSH; DNQ	CSC; DNQ	ATL	NHA	POC; DNQ	ROA	MCH; 28	IRC	GLN	DAY				TEX; 21	ROV	LVS; 31	HOM; 36	MAR		46th	59	
2023	SS-Green Light Racing	07	Chevy								MAR; 36	TAL																	KAN; 21	BRI						PHO; 19	46th	59	
2023	Alpha Prime Racing	44	Chevy																									DAR; DNQ									46th	59	
2024	JD Motorsports	4	Chevy	DAY; 31	ATL; 31	LVS; 34	PHO; 28	COA	RCH; 25	MAR; 24	TEX; 37	TAL; 28	DOV; 29	DAR; 28	CLT; 22	PIR	SON	IOW; 22	NHA	NSH; 37	CSC																101st	0^{1}	
2024	Mike Harmon Racing	74	Chevy																			POC; 38	IND	MCH	DAY	DAR; DNQ	ATL; 37	GLN	BRI; DNQ					HOM; 33			101st	0^{1}	
2024	DGM Racing	92	Chevy																											KAN; 35	TAL	ROV; 24	LVS; 36		MAR; 25	PHO; 32	101st	0^{1}	
2025	Mike Harmon Racing	74	Chevy	DAY	ATL	COA	PHO; 35	LVS; 32	HOM; DNQ	MAR; DNQ	DAR; DNQ	BRI	CAR; DNQ	TAL	TEX; DNQ	CLT; DNQ	NSH	MXC	POC; 33	ATL	CSC	SON	DOV	IND; 31	IOW; 38	GLN	DAY	PIR	GTW	BRI	KAN	ROV	LVS	TAL	MAR	PHO; 36	59th	19	
2026	Mike Harmon Racing	74	Chevy	DAY	ATL; DNQ	COA	PHO; 36	LVS; DNQ	DAR; Wth	MAR; DNQ	CAR; 35	BRI	KAN; 29	TAL; 34																							41st	69	
2026	Joey Gase Motorsports with Scott Osteen	35	Chevy												TEX; 38	GLN	DOV; 28	CLT; 33	NSH; 34	POC	COR; 21	SON; 33															41st	69	
2026	Team Stange Racing with Mike Harmon Racing	47	Chevy																				CHI; 38	ATL	IND; Wth	IOW	DAY; DNQ	DAR; 36	GTW; 36	BRI	LVS; 35	CLT; 37	PHO; 37	TAL	MAR; 28	HOM; 35	41st	69	

==== Craftsman Truck Series ====
NASCAR Craftsman Truck Series results
Year	Team	No.	Make	1	2	3	4	5	6	7	8	9	10	11	12	13	14	15	16	17	18	19	20	21	22	23	24	25	NCTC	Pts	Ref
2017	Cram Racing Enterprises	11	Chevy	DAY	ATL	MAR	KAN	DOV	CLT	TEX	IOW	GTW	KEN	ELD	POC	BRI	MCH	MSP	CHI	NHA	LVS	TAL	MAR; Wth	TEX	PHO	HOM			104th	–	
2018	Beaver Motorsports	50	Chevy	DAY	ATL	LVS	MAR; 17	DOV	KAN	CLT	TEX	IOW	GTW	CHI	KEN	ELD	POC	MCH	BRI	MSP	LVS	TAL							43rd	54	
2018	Copp Motorsports	83	Chevy																				MAR; 24	TEX	PHO; 16	HOM			43rd	54	
2019	Copp Motorsports	63	Chevy	DAY	ATL	LVS	MAR; DNQ	TEX	DOV	KAN	CLT	TEX	IOW	GTW	CHI	KEN	POC	ELD	MCH	BRI	MSP	LVS	TAL						71st	24	
2019	Reaume Brothers Racing	33	Chevy																					MAR; 13	PHO	HOM			71st	24	
2020	Long Motorsports	55	Chevy	DAY	LVS	CLT; DNQ	ATL; DNQ	HOM; 32	POC	KEN; 28	TEX			MCH; 14	DRC	DOV; 25													32nd	154	
2020	Reaume Brothers Racing	00	Toyota									KAN; 25	KAN																32nd	154	
2020	Cram Racing Enterprises	41	Chevy														GTW; 22	DAR; 33	RCH	BRI	LVS; 35	TAL; 35	KAN; 23	TEX; 18	MAR; 16	PHO; 28			32nd	154	
2021	Cram Racing Enterprises	41	Chevy	DAY; DNQ	DRC; 17	LVS; 21	ATL; 31	BRD	RCH; 25	KAN; 31	DAR; 31	COA; DNQ	CLT; 21	TEX; 21	NSH; 28	POC	KNX	GLN	GTW; 30	DAR; 23	BRI; 35	LVS	TAL	MAR; 23	PHO; DNQ				30th	144	
2023	G2G Racing	47	Toyota	DAY	LVS	ATL	COA	TEX	BRD	MAR	KAN	DAR; 35	NWS	CLT	GTW	NSH	MOH	POC	RCH	IRP	MLW	KAN	BRI	TAL	HOM	PHO			111th	0^{1}	
2024	Faction46	46	Chevy	DAY	ATL	LVS	BRI	COA	MAR	TEX	KAN	DAR	NWS	CLT	GTW	NSH; 20	POC	IRP	RCH	MLW	BRI	KAN	TAL	HOM	MAR	PHO			57th	17	
2025	Mike Harmon Racing	74	Toyota	DAY	ATL	LVS	HOM	MAR	BRI	CAR	TEX	KAN	NWS	CLT	NSH	MCH	POC; 32	LRP	IRP	GLN	RCH	DAR	BRI	NHA	ROV	TAL	MAR	PHO	105th	0^{1}	

^{*} Season still in progress
^{1} Ineligible for series points
^{2} Switched to Truck points mid season

=== ARCA Menards Series ===
(key) (Bold – Pole position awarded by qualifying time. Italics – Pole position earned by points standings or practice time. * – Most laps led.)

ARCA Menards Series results
Year	Team	No.	Make	1	2	3	4	5	6	7	8	9	10	11	12	13	14	15	16	17	18	19	20	AMSC	Pts	Ref
2020	Fast Track Racing	11	Toyota	DAY	PHO; 11	TAL	POC	IRP	KEN	IOW	KAN	TOL	TOL	MCH	DRC	GTW	I44	TOL	BRI	WIN	MEM	ISF	KAN	62nd	33	
