= 2024 ToyotaCare 250 =

6th race of the 2024 NASCAR Xfinity Series

Race details
- Race 6 of 33 of the 2024 NASCAR Xfinity Series
- Date: March 30, 2024
- Official name: 44th Annual ToyotaCare 250
- Location: Richmond Raceway in Richmond, Virginia
- Course: Permanent racing facility
- Course length: 0.75 miles (1.21 km)
- Distance: 250 laps, 187 mi (301 km)
- Scheduled distance: 250 laps, 187 mi (301 km)
- Average speed: 81.179 mph (130.645 km/h)

Pole position
Driver	Parker Retzlaff	Jordan Anderson Racing
- Time: 22.420

Most laps led
Driver	Aric Almirola	Joe Gibbs Racing
- Laps: 95

Winner
No. 81	Chandler Smith	Joe Gibbs Racing

Television in the United States
- Network: FS1
- Announcers: Adam Alexander, Joey Logano, and Brad Keselowski

Radio in the United States
- Radio: MRN

The 2024 ToyotaCare 250 was the 6th stock car race of the 2024 NASCAR Xfinity Series, and the 44th iteration of the event. The race was held on Saturday, March 30, 2024, at Richmond Raceway in Richmond, Virginia, a 0.75 miles (1.21 km) permanent asphalt tri-oval shaped short track. The race took the scheduled 250 laps to complete. Chandler Smith, driving for Joe Gibbs Racing, would dominate the final stages of the race, leading 76 laps and earning his third career NASCAR Xfinity Series win, his second of the season, and his second consecutive win at Richmond. Smith's teammate, Aric Almirola, was the most consistent driver of the race, leading a race-high 95 laps and winning both stages. He ended up finishing 2nd in the race. To fill out the podium, Taylor Gray, driving for Joe Gibbs Racing, would finish 3rd in his series debut in a JGR 1-2-3 finish.

The race would feature a late race incident between Joey Gase and Dawson Cram. While battling outside the top 25 on lap 171, Cram and Gase had made contact at the end of the frontstretch, causing Gase to spin into the outside wall in turn 1. Frustrated, Gase reacted by ripping off his back bumper cover, and throwing it at Cram's car. NASCAR had fined Joey Gase $5,000 on a safety violation may be imposed for any action or omission by a competitor or vehicle that creates an unsafe environment or poses a threat to the safety of the Competitors.

== Report ==
=== Background ===
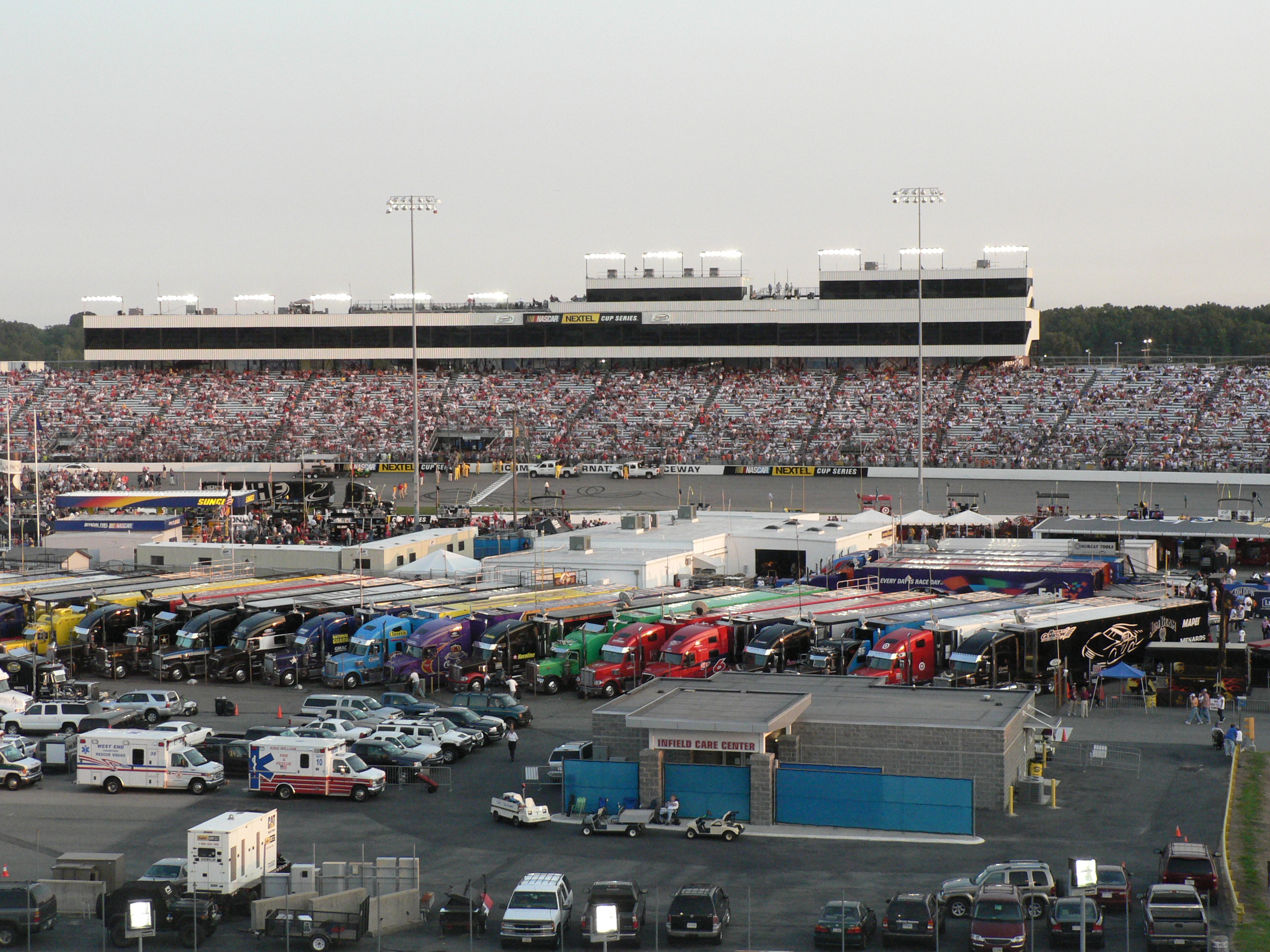
Richmond Raceway, the circuit where the race was held.

Richmond Raceway (RR) is a 0.75 miles (1.21 km), D-shaped, asphalt race track located just outside Richmond, Virginia in unincorporated Henrico County. It hosts the NASCAR Cup Series, NASCAR Xfinity Series and the NASCAR Craftsman Truck Series. Known as "America's premier short track", it has formerly hosted events such as the International Race of Champions, Denny Hamlin Short Track Showdown, and the USAC sprint car series. Due to Richmond Raceway's unique "D" shape which allows drivers to reach high speeds, Richmond has long been known as a short track that races like a superspeedway. With its multiple racing grooves, and proclivity for contact Richmond is a favorite among NASCAR drivers and fans.

==== Entry list ====
- (R) denotes rookie driver.
- (i) denotes driver who is ineligible for series driver points.

#	Driver	Team	Make
00	Cole Custer	Stewart–Haas Racing	Ford
1	Sam Mayer	JR Motorsports	Chevrolet
2	Jesse Love (R)	Richard Childress Racing	Chevrolet
4	Dawson Cram (R)	JD Motorsports	Chevrolet
5	Anthony Alfredo	Our Motorsports	Chevrolet
6	Garrett Smithley	JD Motorsports	Chevrolet
07	Patrick Emerling	SS-Green Light Racing	Chevrolet
7	Justin Allgaier	JR Motorsports	Chevrolet
8	Sammy Smith	JR Motorsports	Chevrolet
9	Brandon Jones	JR Motorsports	Chevrolet
11	Josh Williams	Kaulig Racing	Chevrolet
14	Logan Bearden	SS-Green Light Racing	Chevrolet
15	Hailie Deegan (R)	AM Racing	Ford
16	A. J. Allmendinger	Kaulig Racing	Chevrolet
18	Sheldon Creed	Joe Gibbs Racing	Toyota
19	Taylor Gray (i)	Joe Gibbs Racing	Toyota
20	Aric Almirola	Joe Gibbs Racing	Toyota
21	Austin Hill	Richard Childress Racing	Chevrolet
26	Corey Heim (i)	Sam Hunt Racing	Toyota
27	Jeb Burton	Jordan Anderson Racing	Chevrolet
28	Kyle Sieg	RSS Racing	Ford
29	Blaine Perkins	RSS Racing	Ford
31	Parker Retzlaff	Jordan Anderson Racing	Chevrolet
32	Ryan Vargas	Jordan Anderson Racing	Chevrolet
35	Joey Gase	Joey Gase Motorsports	Chevrolet
38	Matt DiBenedetto	RSS Racing	Ford
39	Ryan Sieg	RSS Racing	Ford
42	Leland Honeyman (R)	Young's Motorsports	Chevrolet
43	Ryan Ellis	Alpha Prime Racing	Chevrolet
44	Brennan Poole	Alpha Prime Racing	Chevrolet
48	Parker Kligerman	Big Machine Racing	Chevrolet
51	Jeremy Clements	Jeremy Clements Racing	Chevrolet
81	Chandler Smith	Joe Gibbs Racing	Toyota
88	Bubba Pollard	JR Motorsports	Chevrolet
91	Kyle Weatherman	DGM Racing	Chevrolet
92	Josh Bilicki	DGM Racing	Chevrolet
97	Shane van Gisbergen (R)	Kaulig Racing	Chevrolet
98	Riley Herbst	Stewart–Haas Racing	Ford
Official entry list

== Practice ==
The first and only practice session was held on Saturday, March 30, at 8:35 AM EST, and would last for 20 minutes. Bubba Pollard, driving for JR Motorsports, would set the fastest time in the session, with a lap of 22.855, and a speed of 118.136 mph (190.121 km/h).

Pos.	#	Driver	Team	Make	Time	Speed
1	88	Bubba Pollard	JR Motorsports	Chevrolet	22.855	118.136
2	11	Josh Williams	Kaulig Racing	Chevrolet	22.860	118.110
3	91	Kyle Weatherman	DGM Racing	Chevrolet	22.893	117.940
Full practice results

== Qualifying ==
Qualifying was held on Saturday, March 30, at 9:05 AM EST. Since Richmond Raceway is a short track, the qualifying system used is a single-car, two-lap system with only one round. Drivers will be on track by themselves and will have two laps to post a qualifying time. Whoever sets the fastest time in that round will win the pole.

Parker Retzlaff, driving for Jordan Anderson Racing, would score his first career pole for the race, with a lap of 22.420, and a speed of 120.428 mph (193.810 km/h).

No drivers would fail to qualify.

=== Qualifying results ===
Pos.	#	Driver	Team	Make	Time	Speed
1	31	Parker Retzlaff	Jordan Anderson Racing	Chevrolet	22.420	120.428
2	9	Brandon Jones	JR Motorsports	Chevrolet	22.516	119.915
3	00	Cole Custer	Stewart–Haas Racing	Ford	22.517	119.909
4	81	Chandler Smith	Joe Gibbs Racing	Toyota	22.521	119.888
5	7	Justin Allgaier	JR Motorsports	Chevrolet	22.571	119.623
6	26	Corey Heim (i)	Sam Hunt Racing	Toyota	22.576	119.596
7	16	A. J. Allmendinger	Kaulig Racing	Chevrolet	22.599	119.474
8	2	Jesse Love (R)	Richard Childress Racing	Chevrolet	22.734	118.765
9	48	Parker Kligerman	Big Machine Racing	Chevrolet	22.747	118.697
10	20	Aric Almirola	Joe Gibbs Racing	Toyota	22.757	118.645
11	1	Sam Mayer	JR Motorsports	Chevrolet	22.763	118.614
12	97	Shane van Gisbergen (R)	Kaulig Racing	Chevrolet	22.782	118.515
13	8	Sammy Smith	JR Motorsports	Chevrolet	22.797	118.437
14	98	Riley Herbst	Stewart–Haas Racing	Ford	22.813	118.354
15	39	Ryan Sieg	RSS Racing	Ford	22.840	118.214
16	21	Austin Hill	Richard Childress Racing	Chevrolet	22.842	118.203
17	51	Jeremy Clements	Jeremy Clements Racing	Chevrolet	22.845	118.188
18	5	Anthony Alfredo	Our Motorsports	Chevrolet	22.858	118.121
19	44	Brennan Poole	Alpha Prime Racing	Chevrolet	22.869	118.064
20	18	Sheldon Creed	Joe Gibbs Racing	Toyota	22.896	117.925
21	27	Jeb Burton	Jordan Anderson Racing	Chevrolet	22.923	117.786
22	43	Ryan Ellis	Alpha Prime Racing	Chevrolet	22.945	117.673
23	91	Kyle Weatherman	DGM Racing	Chevrolet	23.035	117.213
24	15	Hailie Deegan (R)	AM Racing	Ford	23.054	117.116
25	42	Leland Honeyman (R)	Young's Motorsports	Chevrolet	23.062	117.076
26	11	Josh Williams	Kaulig Racing	Chevrolet	23.075	117.010
27	19	Taylor Gray (i)	Joe Gibbs Racing	Toyota	23.110	116.833
28	29	Blaine Perkins	RSS Racing	Ford	23.171	116.525
29	92	Josh Bilicki	DGM Racing	Chevrolet	23.173	116.515
30	32	Ryan Vargas	Jordan Anderson Racing	Chevrolet	23.197	116.394
31	38	Matt DiBenedetto	RSS Racing	Ford	23.243	116.164
32	14	Logan Bearden	SS-Green Light Racing	Chevrolet	23.261	116.074
33	4	Dawson Cram (R)	JD Motorsports	Chevrolet	23.269	116.034
Qualified by owner's points
34	28	Kyle Sieg	RSS Racing	Ford	23.326	115.751
35	07	Patrick Emerling	SS-Green Light Racing	Chevrolet	23.507	114.859
36	6	Garrett Smithley	JD Motorsports	Chevrolet	23.524	114.776
37	88	Bubba Pollard	JR Motorsports	Chevrolet	23.947	112.749
38	35	Joey Gase	Joey Gase Motorsports	Chevrolet	–	–
Official qualifying results
Official starting lineup

== Race results ==
Stage 1 Laps: 75

Pos.	#	Driver	Team	Make	Pts
1	20	Aric Almirola	Joe Gibbs Racing	Toyota	10
2	44	Brennan Poole	Alpha Prime Racing	Chevrolet	9
3	26	Corey Heim (i)	Sam Hunt Racing	Toyota	0
4	7	Justin Allgaier	JR Motorsports	Chevrolet	7
5	1	Sam Mayer	JR Motorsports	Chevrolet	6
6	98	Riley Herbst	Stewart–Haas Racing	Ford	5
7	81	Chandler Smith	Joe Gibbs Racing	Toyota	4
8	00	Cole Custer	Stewart–Haas Racing	Ford	3
9	19	Taylor Gray (i)	Joe Gibbs Racing	Toyota	0
10	8	Sammy Smith	JR Motorsports	Chevrolet	1

Stage 2 Laps: 75

Pos.	#	Driver	Team	Make	Pts
1	20	Aric Almirola	Joe Gibbs Racing	Toyota	10
2	1	Sam Mayer	JR Motorsports	Chevrolet	9
3	81	Chandler Smith	Joe Gibbs Racing	Toyota	8
4	19	Taylor Gray (i)	Joe Gibbs Racing	Toyota	0
5	26	Corey Heim (i)	Sam Hunt Racing	Toyota	0
6	7	Justin Allgaier	JR Motorsports	Chevrolet	5
7	21	Austin Hill	Richard Childress Racing	Chevrolet	4
8	31	Parker Retzlaff	Jordan Anderson Racing	Chevrolet	3
9	00	Cole Custer	Stewart–Haas Racing	Ford	2
10	14	Logan Bearden	SS-Green Light Racing	Chevrolet	1

Stage 3 Laps: 100

Fin	St	#	Driver	Team	Make	Laps	Led	Status	Pts
1	4	81	Chandler Smith	Joe Gibbs Racing	Toyota	250	76	Running	52
2	10	20	Aric Almirola	Joe Gibbs Racing	Toyota	250	95	Running	55
3	27	19	Taylor Gray (i)	Joe Gibbs Racing	Toyota	250	0	Running	0
4	6	26	Corey Heim (i)	Sam Hunt Racing	Toyota	250	15	Running	0
5	8	2	Jesse Love (R)	Richard Childress Racing	Chevrolet	250	0	Running	32
6	37	88	Bubba Pollard	JR Motorsports	Chevrolet	250	0	Running	31
7	9	48	Parker Kligerman	Big Machine Racing	Chevrolet	250	0	Running	30
8	16	21	Austin Hill	Richard Childress Racing	Chevrolet	250	0	Running	33
9	13	8	Sammy Smith	JR Motorsports	Chevrolet	250	0	Running	29
10	3	00	Cole Custer	Stewart–Haas Racing	Ford	249	7	Running	32
11	5	7	Justin Allgaier	JR Motorsports	Chevrolet	249	28	Running	38
12	26	11	Josh Williams	Kaulig Racing	Chevrolet	249	0	Running	25
13	14	98	Riley Herbst	Stewart–Haas Racing	Ford	249	0	Running	29
14	7	16	A. J. Allmendinger	Kaulig Racing	Chevrolet	249	0	Running	23
15	12	97	Shane van Gisbergen (R)	Kaulig Racing	Chevrolet	249	0	Running	22
16	1	31	Parker Retzlaff	Jordan Anderson Racing	Chevrolet	249	27	Running	24
17	23	91	Kyle Weatherman	DGM Racing	Chevrolet	249	0	Running	20
18	31	38	Matt DiBenedetto	RSS Racing	Ford	249	0	Running	19
19	29	92	Josh Bilicki	DGM Racing	Chevrolet	249	0	Running	18
20	25	42	Leland Honeyman (R)	Young's Motorsports	Chevrolet	249	0	Running	17
21	36	6	Garrett Smithley	JD Motorsports	Chevrolet	249	0	Running	16
22	32	14	Logan Bearden	SS-Green Light Racing	Chevrolet	249	0	Running	16
23	34	28	Kyle Sieg	RSS Racing	Ford	249	0	Running	14
24	17	51	Jeremy Clements	Jeremy Clements Racing	Chevrolet	249	0	Running	13
25	33	4	Dawson Cram (R)	JD Motorsports	Chevrolet	248	0	Running	12
26	21	27	Jeb Burton	Jordan Anderson Racing	Chevrolet	248	0	Running	11
27	22	43	Ryan Ellis	Alpha Prime Racing	Chevrolet	248	0	Running	10
28	19	44	Brennan Poole	Alpha Prime Racing	Chevrolet	248	0	Running	18
29	18	5	Anthony Alfredo	Our Motorsports	Chevrolet	248	0	Running	8
30	11	1	Sam Mayer	JR Motorsports	Chevrolet	246	2	Running	22
31	24	15	Hailie Deegan (R)	AM Racing	Ford	241	0	Running	6
32	15	39	Ryan Sieg	RSS Racing	Ford	220	0	Running	5
33	28	29	Blaine Perkins	RSS Racing	Ford	181	0	Running	4
34	38	35	Joey Gase	Joey Gase Motorsports	Chevrolet	171	0	Accident	3
35	20	18	Sheldon Creed	Joe Gibbs Racing	Toyota	118	0	Brakes	2
36	35	07	Patrick Emerling	SS-Green Light Racing	Chevrolet	95	0	Brakes	1
37	2	9	Brandon Jones	JR Motorsports	Chevrolet	42	0	Engine	1
38	30	32	Ryan Vargas	Jordan Anderson Racing	Chevrolet	18	0	Engine	1
Official race results

== Standings after the race ==
Drivers' Championship standings

	Pos	Driver	Points
1	1	Chandler Smith	265
1	2	Austin Hill	255 (-10)
	3	Cole Custer	224 (–41)
	4	Jesse Love	198 (–67)
	5	Riley Herbst	194 (–71)
	6	A. J. Allmendinger	185 (–80)
1	7	Justin Allgaier	181 (–84)
1	8	Parker Kligerman	177 (–88)
2	9	Sammy Smith	153 (–112)
1	10	Brandon Jones	140 (–125)
1	11	Sheldon Creed	137 (–128)
	12	Anthony Alfredo	131 (–134)
Official driver's standings

Manufacturers' Championship standings

Pos	Manufacturer	Points
1	Chevrolet	220
2	Toyota	214 (–6)
3	Ford	180 (–40)

- Note: Only the first 12 positions are included for the driver standings.

Previous race: 2024 Focused Health 250 (COTA)	NASCAR Xfinity Series; 2024 season	Next race: 2024 Dude Wipes 250
