= 2022 XPEL 225 =

Fourth race of the 2022 NASCAR Camping World Truck Series

Race details
- Race 4 of 23 of the 2022 NASCAR Camping World Truck Series
- Date: March 26, 2022
- Official name: Second Annual XPEL 225
- Location: Austin, Texas, Circuit of the Americas
- Course: Permanent racing facility
- Course length: 3.426 miles (5.514 km)
- Distance: 46 laps, 156.860 mi (252.441 km)
- Scheduled distance: 41 laps, 140.507 mi (226.115 km)
- Average speed: 64.908 mph (104.459 km/h)

Pole position
Driver	Sheldon Creed	Young's Motorsports
- Time: 2:14.924

Most laps led
Driver	Kyle Busch	Kyle Busch Motorsports
- Laps: 31

Winner
No. 38	Zane Smith	Front Row Motorsports

Television in the United States
- Network: Fox Sports 1
- Announcers: Vince Welch, Andy Lally, Michael Waltrip

Radio in the United States
- Radio: Motor Racing Network

The 2022 XPEL 225 was the fourth stock car race of the 2022 NASCAR Camping World Truck Series and the second iteration of the event. The race was held on Saturday, March 26, 2022, in Austin, Texas, at the Circuit of the Americas, a 3.426 miles (5.514 km) permanent road course. The race was run over 46 laps due to multiple overtime restarts. Zane Smith of Front Row Motorsports would win race, after taking the lead with two laps to go. This was Smith's fifth career truck series win, and his second of the season. To fill out the podium, John Hunter Nemechek and Kyle Busch of Kyle Busch Motorsports would finish second and third, respectively.

== Background ==
Circuit of the Americas (COTA) is a grade 1 FIA-specification motorsports facility located within the extraterritorial jurisdiction of Austin, Texas. It features a 3.426-mile (5.514 km) road racing circuit. The facility is home to the Formula One United States Grand Prix, and the Motorcycle Grand Prix of the Americas, a round of the FIM Road Racing World Championship. It previously hosted the Supercars Championship, the FIA World Endurance Championship, the IMSA SportsCar Championship, and IndyCar Series.

On September 30, 2020, it was announced that COTA would host a NASCAR Cup Series event for the first time on May 23, 2021. The lower Xfinity and Camping World Truck Series were also added as support events. On December 11, 2020, it was announced that NASCAR would run the full 3.41 mile course.

=== Entry list ===
- (R) denotes rookie driver.
- (i) denotes driver who is ineligible for series driver points.

#	Driver	Team	Make
1	Hailie Deegan	David Gilliland Racing	Ford
02	Kaz Grala	Young's Motorsports	Chevrolet
4	John Hunter Nemechek	Kyle Busch Motorsports	Toyota
5	Tyler Hill	Hill Motorsports	Toyota
7	Alex Bowman (i)	Spire Motorsports	Chevrolet
9	Blaine Perkins (R)	CR7 Motorsports	Chevrolet
12	Spencer Boyd	Young's Motorsports	Chevrolet
15	Tanner Gray	David Gilliland Racing	Ford
16	Tyler Ankrum	Hattori Racing Enterprises	Toyota
17	Taylor Gray	David Gilliland Racing	Ford
18	Chandler Smith	Kyle Busch Motorsports	Toyota
19	Derek Kraus	McAnally-Hilgemann Racing	Chevrolet
20	Sheldon Creed (i)	Young's Motorsports	Chevrolet
22	Austin Wayne Self	AM Racing	Chevrolet
23	Grant Enfinger	GMS Racing	Chevrolet
24	Jack Wood (R)	GMS Racing	Chevrolet
25	Matt DiBenedetto	Rackley WAR	Chevrolet
30	Tate Fogleman	On Point Motorsports	Toyota
33	Will Rodgers (i)	Reaume Brothers Racing	Toyota
37	Logan Bearden	AM Racing	Chevrolet
38	Zane Smith	Front Row Motorsports	Ford
40	Dean Thompson (R)	Niece Motorsports	Chevrolet
42	Carson Hocevar	Niece Motorsports	Chevrolet
43	Brad Perez	Reaume Brothers Racing	Toyota
44	Kris Wright	Niece Motorsports	Chevrolet
45	Lawless Alan (R)	Niece Motorsports	Chevrolet
46	Matt Jaskol	G2G Racing	Toyota
47	Samuel LeComte (i)	G2G Racing	Toyota
51	Kyle Busch (i)	Kyle Busch Motorsports	Toyota
52	Stewart Friesen	Halmar Friesen Racing	Toyota
56	Timmy Hill	Hill Motorsports	Toyota
61	Chase Purdy	Hattori Racing Enterprises	Toyota
66	Ty Majeski	ThorSport Racing	Toyota
75	Parker Kligerman	Henderson Motorsports	Chevrolet
79	John Atwell	Atwell Motorsports	Chevrolet
88	Matt Crafton	ThorSport Racing	Toyota
91	Colby Howard	McAnally-Hilgemann Racing	Chevrolet
98	Christian Eckes	ThorSport Racing	Toyota
99	Ben Rhodes	ThorSport Racing	Toyota
Official entry list

== Practice ==
The only 30-minute practice session was held on Friday, March 25, at 2:00 PM CST. Sheldon Creed of Young's Motorsports would set the fastest time in the session, with a time of 2:17.104 seconds and a speed of 89.538 mph (144.097 km/h).

Pos.	#	Driver	Team	Make	Time	Speed
1	20	Sheldon Creed (i)	Young's Motorsports	Chevrolet	2:17.104	89.538
2	51	Kyle Busch (i)	Kyle Busch Motorsports	Toyota	2:17.450	89.313
3	18	Chandler Smith	Kyle Busch Motorsports	Toyota	2:17.484	89.290
Full practice results

== Qualifying ==
Qualifying was held on Friday, March 25, at 2:30 PM CST. Since Circuit of the Americas is a road course, the qualifying system is a two group system, with two rounds. Drivers will be separated into two groups, Group A and Group B. Each driver will have a lap to set a time. The fastest 5 drivers from each group will advance to the final round. Drivers will also have one lap to set a time. The fastest driver to set a time in the round will win the pole.

Sheldon Creed of Young's Motorsports scored the pole for the race with a time of 2:14.924 seconds and a speed of 90.985 mph (146.426 km/h).

=== Full qualifying results ===
Pos	No.	Driver	Team	Manufacturer	Time (R1)	Speed (R1)	Time (R2)	Speed (R2)
1	20	Sheldon Creed (i)	Young's Motorsports	Chevrolet	2:15:084	90.877	2:14.924	90.985
2	38	Zane Smith	Front Row Motorsports	Ford	2:15.379	90.488	2:15.213	90.790
3	7	Alex Bowman (i)	Spire Motorsports	Chevrolet	2:15.189	90.806	2:15.409	90.659
4	75	Parker Kligerman	Henderson Motorsports	Chevrolet	2:15.485	90.108	2:15.685	90.474
5	51	Kyle Busch (i)	Kyle Busch Motorsports	Toyota	2:14.940	90.974	2:15.705	90.461
6	42	Carson Hocevar	Niece Motorsports	Chevrolet	2:15.020	90.920	2:16.433	89.978
7	52	Stewart Friesen	Halmar Friesen Racing	Toyota	2:16.610	89.862	2:16.667	89.824
8	98	Christian Eckes	ThorSport Racing	Toyota	2:16.600	89.868	2:17.093	89.545
9	17	Taylor Gray	David Gilliland Racing	Ford	2:16.647	89.837	2:17.282	89.422
10	16	Tyler Ankrum	Hattori Racing Enterprises	Toyota	2:16.465	89.957	2:18.186	88.837
Eliminated from Round 1
11	4	John Hunter Nemechek	Kyle Busch Motorsports	Toyota	2:15.824	90.382	—	—
12	18	Chandler Smith	Kyle Busch Motorsports	Toyota	2:16.059	90.226	—	—
13	99	Ben Rhodes	ThorSport Racing	Toyota	2:16.692	89.808	—	—
14	19	Derek Kraus	McAnally-Hilgemann Racing	Chevrolet	2:16.739	89.777	—	—
15	22	Austin Wayne Self	AM Racing	Chevrolet	2:17.139	89.515	—	—
16	23	Grant Enfinger	GMS Racing	Chevrolet	2:17.141	89.514	—	—
17	44	Kris Wright	Niece Motorsports	Chevrolet	2:17.275	89.426	—	—
18	02	Kaz Grala	Young's Motorsports	Chevrolet	2:17.731	89.130	—	—
19	66	Ty Majeski	ThorSport Racing	Toyota	2:17.820	89.073	—	—
20	88	Matt Crafton	ThorSport Racing	Toyota	2:18.040	88.931	—	—
21	37	Logan Bearden	AM Racing	Chevrolet	2:18.078	88.906	—	—
22	61	Chase Purdy	Hattori Racing Enterprises	Toyota	2:18.106	88.888	—	—
23	1	Hailie Deegan	David Gilliland Racing	Ford	2:18.290	88.770	—	—
24	45	Lawless Alan (R)	Niece Motorsports	Chevrolet	2:18.350	88.731	—	—
25	56	Timmy Hill	Hill Motorsports	Toyota	2:18.401	88.699	—	—
26	91	Colby Howard	McAnally-Hilgemann Racing	Chevrolet	2:18.755	88.472	—	—
27	24	Jack Wood (R)	GMS Racing	Chevrolet	2:18.986	88.325	—	—
28	15	Tanner Gray	David Gilliland Racing	Ford	2:19.302	88.125	—	—
29	9	Blaine Perkins (R)	CR7 Motorsports	Chevrolet	2:19.694	87.878	—	—
30	12	Spencer Boyd	Young's Motorsports	Chevrolet	2:19.837	87.788	—	—
31	30	Tate Fogleman	On Point Motorsports	Toyota	2:20.029	87.668	—	—
Qualified by owner's points
32	43	Brad Perez	Reaume Brothers Racing	Toyota	2:21.330	86.745	—	—
33	40	Dean Thompson (R)	Niece Motorsports	Chevrolet	2:21.687	86.642	—	—
34	33	Will Rodgers (i)	Reaume Brothers Racing	Toyota	2:22.050	86.417	—	—
35	46	Matt Jaskol	G2G Racing	Toyota	2:22.170	86.231	—	—
36	25	Matt DiBenedetto	Rackley WAR	Chevrolet	—	—	—	—
Failed to qualify
37	79	John Atwell	Atwell Motorsports	Chevrolet	2:20.230	87.542	—	—
38	5	Tyler Hill	Hill Motorsports	Toyota	2:22.250	86.126	—	—
39	47	Samuel LeComte (i)	G2G Racing	Toyota	2:30.448	81.596	—	—
Official starting lineup

== Race results ==
Stage 1 Laps: 12

Pos.	#	Driver	Team	Make	Pts
1	38	Zane Smith	Front Row Motorsports	Ford	10
2	52	Stewart Friesen	Halmar Friesen Racing	Toyota	9
3	99	Ben Rhodes	ThorSport Racing	Toyota	8
4	19	Derek Kraus	McAnally-Hilgemann Racing	Chevrolet	7
5	16	Tyler Ankrum	Hattori Racing Enterprises	Toyota	6
6	25	Matt DiBenedetto	Rackley WAR	Chevrolet	5
7	56	Timmy Hill	Hill Motorsports	Toyota	4
8	98	Christian Eckes	ThorSport Racing	Toyota	3
9	51	Kyle Busch (i)	Kyle Busch Motorsports	Toyota	0
10	75	Parker Kligerman	Henderson Motorsports	Chevrolet	1

Stage 2 Laps: 14

Pos.	#	Driver	Team	Make	Pts
1	38	Zane Smith	Front Row Motorsports	Ford	10
2	99	Ben Rhodes	ThorSport Racing	Toyota	9
3	19	Derek Kraus	McAnally-Hilgemann Racing	Chevrolet	8
4	51	Kyle Busch (i)	Kyle Busch Motorsports	Toyota	0
5	18	Chandler Smith	Kyle Busch Motorsports	Toyota	6
6	25	Matt DiBenedetto	Rackley WAR	Chevrolet	5
7	52	Stewart Friesen	Halmar Friesen Racing	Toyota	4
8	42	Carson Hocevar	Niece Motorsports	Chevrolet	3
9	56	Timmy Hill	Hill Motorsports	Toyota	2
10	75	Parker Kligerman	Henderson Motorsports	Chevrolet	1

Stage 3 Laps: 15

Fin.	St	#	Driver	Team	Make	Laps	Led	Status	Points
1	2	38	Zane Smith	Front Row Motorsports	Ford	46	11	Running	60
2	11	4	John Hunter Nemechek	Kyle Busch Motorsports	Toyota	46	1	Running	35
3	5	51	Kyle Busch (i)	Kyle Busch Motorsports	Toyota	46	31	Running	0
4	13	99	Ben Rhodes	ThorSport Racing	Toyota	46	0	Running	50
5	12	18	Chandler Smith	Kyle Busch Motorsports	Toyota	46	1	Running	38
6	8	98	Christian Eckes	ThorSport Racing	Toyota	46	0	Running	34
7	10	16	Tyler Ankrum	Hattori Racing Enterprises	Toyota	46	0	Running	36
8	6	42	Carson Hocevar	Niece Motorsports	Chevrolet	46	0	Running	32
9	7	52	Stewart Friesen	Halmar Friesen Racing	Toyota	46	0	Running	41
10	16	23	Grant Enfinger	GMS Racing	Chevrolet	46	0	Running	27
11	24	45	Lawless Alan (R)	Niece Motorsports	Chevrolet	46	0	Running	26
12	14	19	Derek Kraus	McAnally-Hilgemann Racing	Chevrolet	46	0	Running	40
13	20	88	Matt Crafton	ThorSport Racing	Toyota	46	0	Running	24
14	18	02	Kaz Grala (i)	Young's Motorsports	Chevrolet	46	0	Running	23
15	17	44	Kris Wright	Niece Motorsports	Chevrolet	46	0	Running	22
16	22	61	Chase Purdy	Hattori Racing Enterprises	Toyota	46	0	Running	21
17	28	15	Tanner Gray	David Gilliland Racing	Ford	46	0	Running	20
18	31	30	Tate Fogleman	On Point Motorsports	Toyota	46	0	Running	19
19	4	75	Parker Kligerman	Henderson Motorsports	Chevrolet	46	1	Running	20
20	32	43	Brad Perez	Reaume Brothers Racing	Toyota	46	0	Running	17
21	34	33	Will Rodgers (i)	Reaume Brothers Racing	Toyota	46	0	Running	0
22	25	56	Timmy Hill	Hill Motorsports	Toyota	46	0	Running	21
23	30	12	Spencer Boyd	Young's Motorsports	Chevrolet	46	0	Running	14
24	26	91	Colby Howard	McAnally-Hilgemann Racing	Chevrolet	46	0	Running	13
25	3	7	Alex Bowman (i)	Spire Motorsports	Chevrolet	46	1	Running	0
26	9	17	Taylor Gray	David Gilliland Racing	Ford	46	0	Running	11
27	15	22	Austin Wayne Self	AM Racing	Chevrolet	45	0	Running	10
28	21	37	Logan Bearden	AM Racing	Chevrolet	42	0	Fuel Pump	9
29	33	40	Dean Thompson (R)	Niece Motorsports	Chevrolet	40	0	Running	8
30	19	66	Ty Majeski	ThorSport Racing	Toyota	39	0	Running	7
31	36	25	Matt DiBenedetto	Rackley WAR	Chevrolet	32	0	Rear Gear	16
32	27	24	Jack Wood (R)	GMS Racing	Chevrolet	31	0	DVP	5
33	35	46	Matt Jaskol	G2G Racing	Toyota	30	0	Electrical	4
34	23	1	Hailie Deegan	David Gilliland Racing	Ford	29	0	Accident	3
35	29	9	Blaine Perkins (R)	CR7 Motorsports	Chevrolet	3	0	Transmission	2
36	1	20	Sheldon Creed (i)	Young's Motorsports	Chevrolet	1	0	Drivetrain	0
Official race results

== Standings after the race ==
Drivers' Championship standings

Pos	Driver	Points
1	Chandler Smith	170
2	Ben Rhodes	155 (-15)
3	Stewart Friesen	147 (-23)
4	Zane Smith	139 (-31)
5	Tanner Gray	139 (-31)
6	Christian Eckes	122 (-48)
7	Ty Majeski	122 (-48)
8	John Hunter Nemechek	115 (-55)
9	Tyler Ankrum	104 (-66)
10	Derek Kraus	104 (-66)
Official driver's standings

- Note: Only the first 10 positions are included for the driver standings.

Previous race: 2022 Fr8 208	NASCAR Camping World Truck Series; 2022 season	Next race: 2022 Blue-Emu Maximum Pain Relief 200
