= 2024 Tennessee Lottery 250 =

17th race of the 2024 NASCAR Xfinity Series

Race details
- Race 17 of 33 of the 2024 NASCAR Xfinity Series
- Date: June 29, 2024
- Official name: 4th Annual Tennessee Lottery 250
- Location: Nashville Superspeedway in Lebanon, Tennessee
- Course: Permanent racing facility
- Course length: 1.333 miles (2.145 km)
- Distance: 188 laps, 250 mi (400 km)
- Scheduled distance: 188 laps, 250 mi (400 km)
- Average speed: 127.571 mph (205.306 km/h)

Pole position
Driver	Ty Gibbs	Joe Gibbs Racing
- Time: 30.876

Most laps led
Driver	John Hunter Nemechek	Joe Gibbs Racing
- Laps: 76

Winner
No. 20	John Hunter Nemechek	Joe Gibbs Racing

Television in the United States
- Network: USA
- Announcers: Rick Allen, Jeff Burton and Steve Letarte

Radio in the United States
- Radio: PRN

The 2024 Tennessee Lottery 250 was the 17th stock car race of the 2024 NASCAR Xfinity Series, and the 4th iteration of the event. The race was held on Saturday, June 29, 2024, in Lebanon, Tennessee at Nashville Superspeedway, a 1.333 miles (2.145 km) permanent tri-oval shaped racetrack. The race took the scheduled 188 laps to complete. John Hunter Nemechek, driving for Joe Gibbs Racing, would take the lead from Cole Custer late in the race, and led the final 46 laps to earn his 11th career NASCAR Xfinity Series win, and his second of the season. Nemechek also dominated the majority of the race, leading a race-high 76 laps. To fill out the podium, Chandler Smith, driving for Joe Gibbs Racing, and Jesse Love, driving for Richard Childress Racing, would finish 2nd and 3rd, respectively. This was the last start for Hailie Deegan as she would be replaced by Joey Logano at the Chicago Street Course and other drivers replacing her.

== Report ==
=== Background ===
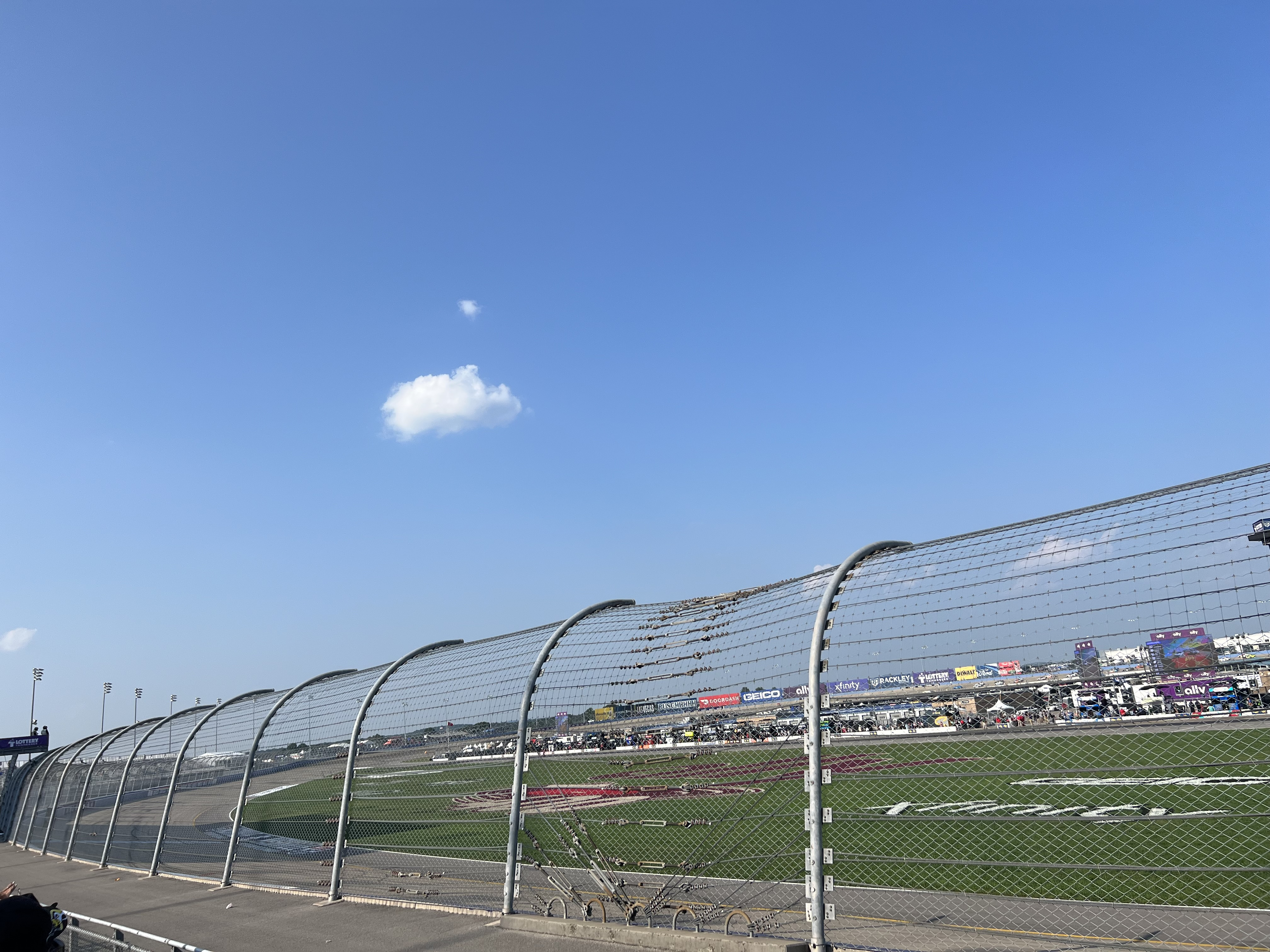
Nashville Superspeedway, the place where the race was held.

Nashville Superspeedway is a motor racing complex located in Lebanon, Tennessee, United States, about 30 miles (48 km) southeast of Nashville. The track was built in 2001 and is currently used for events, driving schools and GT Academy, a reality television competition.

It is a concrete oval track 1 1/3 miles (2.146 km) long. Nashville Superspeedway is owned by Speedway Motorsports, which also owns many other NASCAR tracks. Nashville Superspeedway was the longest concrete oval in NASCAR during the time it was on the NASCAR Xfinity Series and NASCAR Craftsman Truck Series circuits. Current permanent seating capacity is approximately 25,000. Additional portable seats are brought in for some events, and seating capacity can be expanded to 150,000. Infrastructure is in place to expand the facility to include a short track, drag strip, and road course.

==== Entry list ====
- (R) denotes rookie driver.
- (i) denotes driver who is ineligible for series driver points.

#	Driver	Team	Make
00	Cole Custer	Stewart–Haas Racing	Ford
1	Sam Mayer	JR Motorsports	Chevrolet
2	Jesse Love (R)	Richard Childress Racing	Chevrolet
4	Dawson Cram (i)	JD Motorsports	Chevrolet
5	Anthony Alfredo	Our Motorsports	Chevrolet
6	Garrett Smithley	JD Motorsports	Ford
07	Patrick Emerling	SS-Green Light Racing	Chevrolet
7	Justin Allgaier	JR Motorsports	Chevrolet
8	Sammy Smith	JR Motorsports	Chevrolet
9	Brandon Jones	JR Motorsports	Chevrolet
11	Josh Williams	Kaulig Racing	Chevrolet
14	Chad Finchum	SS-Green Light Racing	Chevrolet
15	Hailie Deegan (R)	AM Racing	Ford
16	A. J. Allmendinger	Kaulig Racing	Chevrolet
18	Sheldon Creed	Joe Gibbs Racing	Toyota
19	Ty Gibbs (i)	Joe Gibbs Racing	Toyota
20	John Hunter Nemechek (i)	Joe Gibbs Racing	Toyota
21	Austin Hill	Richard Childress Racing	Chevrolet
26	Tyler Reddick (i)	Sam Hunt Racing	Toyota
27	Jeb Burton	Jordan Anderson Racing	Chevrolet
28	Kyle Sieg	RSS Racing	Ford
29	Blaine Perkins	RSS Racing	Ford
30	Noah Gragson (i)	Rette Jones Racing	Ford
31	Parker Retzlaff	Jordan Anderson Racing	Chevrolet
35	Logan Bearden	Joey Gase Motorsports	Chevrolet
38	Matt DiBenedetto	RSS Racing	Ford
39	Ryan Sieg	RSS Racing	Ford
42	Leland Honeyman (R)	Young's Motorsports	Chevrolet
43	Ryan Ellis	Alpha Prime Racing	Chevrolet
44	Brennan Poole	Alpha Prime Racing	Chevrolet
48	Parker Kligerman	Big Machine Racing	Chevrolet
51	Jeremy Clements	Jeremy Clements Racing	Chevrolet
74	Jade Buford	Mike Harmon Racing	Chevrolet
81	Chandler Smith	Joe Gibbs Racing	Toyota
88	Carson Kvapil	JR Motorsports	Chevrolet
91	Kyle Weatherman	DGM Racing	Chevrolet
92	Ross Chastain (i)	DGM Racing	Chevrolet
97	Shane van Gisbergen (R)	Kaulig Racing	Chevrolet
98	Riley Herbst	Stewart–Haas Racing	Ford
Official entry list

== Practice ==
The first and only practice session was held on Saturday, June 29, at 11:00 AM EST, and would last for 20 minutes. Chandler Smith, driving for Joe Gibbs Racing, would set the fastest time in the session, with a lap of 31.173, and a speed of 153.594 mph (247.186 km/h).

Pos.	#	Driver	Team	Make	Time	Speed
1	81	Chandler Smith	Joe Gibbs Racing	Toyota	31.173	153.594
2	19	Ty Gibbs (i)	Joe Gibbs Racing	Toyota	31.176	153.580
3	92	Ross Chastain (i)	DGM Racing	Chevrolet	31.347	152.742
Full practice results

== Qualifying ==
Qualifying was held on Saturday, June 29, at 11:30 AM EST. Since Nashville Superspeedway is an intermediate speedway, the qualifying system used is a single-car, single-lap system with only one round. All drivers will be on track by themselves and will have one lap to post a qualifying time. Whoever sets the fastest time in that session will win the pole.

Ty Gibbs, driving for Joe Gibbs Racing, would score the pole for the race, with a lap of 30.876, and a speed of 155.072 mph (249.564 km/h).

Jade Buford was the only driver who failed to qualify.

=== Qualifying results ===
Pos.	#	Driver	Team	Make	Time	Speed
1	19	Ty Gibbs (i)	Joe Gibbs Racing	Toyota	30.876	155.072
2	00	Cole Custer	Stewart-Haas Racing	Toyota	30.927	154.816
3	39	Ryan Sieg	RSS Racing	Ford	30.962	154.641
4	16	A. J. Allmendinger	Kaulig Racing	Chevrolet	30.966	154.621
5	21	Austin Hill	Richard Childress Racing	Chevrolet	30.973	154.586
6	7	Justin Allgaier	JR Motorsports	Chevrolet	30.979	154.556
7	30	Noah Gragson (i)	Rette Jones Racing	Ford	30.988	154.511
8	81	Chandler Smith	Joe Gibbs Racing	Toyota	30.990	154.501
9	98	Riley Herbst	Stewart–Haas Racing	Ford	31.037	154.267
10	48	Parker Kligerman	Big Machine Racing	Chevrolet	31.050	154.203
11	26	Tyler Reddick (i)	Sam Hunt Racing	Toyota	31.061	154.148
12	8	Sammy Smith	JR Motorsports	Chevrolet	31.091	154.000
13	9	Brandon Jones	JR Motorsports	Chevrolet	31.099	153.960
14	18	Sheldon Creed	Joe Gibbs Racing	Toyota	31.104	153.935
15	20	John Hunter Nemechek	Joe Gibbs Racing	Toyota	31.111	153.901
16	51	Jeremy Clements	Jeremy Clements Racing	Chevrolet	31.121	153.851
17	5	Anthony Alfredo	Our Motorsports	Chevrolet	31.149	153.713
18	44	Brennan Poole	Alpha Prime Racing	Chevrolet	31.182	153.550
19	27	Jeb Burton	Jordan Anderson Racing	Chevrolet	31.240	153.265
20	92	Ross Chastain (i)	DGM Racing	Chevrolet	31.249	153.221
21	31	Parker Retzlaff	Jordan Anderson Racing	Chevrolet	31.285	153.045
22	38	Matt DiBenedetto	RSS Racing	Ford	31.341	152.771
23	43	Ryan Ellis	Alpha Prime Racing	Chevrolet	31.397	152.499
24	1	Sam Mayer	JR Motorsports	Chevrolet	31.470	152.145
25	42	Leland Honeyman (R)	JR Motorsports	Chevrolet	31.470	152.145
26	11	Josh Williams	Kaulig Racing	Chevrolet	31.501	151.995
27	28	Kyle Sieg	RSS Racing	Ford	31.516	151.923
28	97	Shane van Gisbergen	Kaulig Racing	Chevrolet	31.541	151.802
29	91	Kyle Weatherman	DGM Racing	Chevrolet	31.542	151.798
30	88	Carson Kvapil	JR Motorsports	Chevrolet	31.578	151.625
31	15	Hailie Deegan (R)	AM Racing	Ford	31.601	151.514
32	4	Dawson Cram (i)	JD Motorsports	Chevrolet	31.675	151.160
33	07	Patrick Emerling	SS-Green Light Racing	Chevrolet	31.687	151.103
Qualified by owner's points
34	29	Blaine Perkins	RSS Racing	Ford	31.790	150.613
35	14	Chad Finchum	SS-Green Light Racing	Chevrolet	31.796	150.585
36	6	Garrett Smithley	JD Motorsports	Ford	31.848	150.339
37	35	Logan Bearden	Joey Gase Motorsports	Chevrolet	31.897	150.108
38	2	Jesse Love (R)	Richard Childress Racing	Chevrolet	–	–
Failed to qualify
39	74	Jade Buford	Mike Harmon Racing	Chevrolet	–	–
Official qualifying results
Official starting lineup

== Race results ==
Stage 1 Laps: 45

Pos.	#	Driver	Team	Make	Pts
1	19	Ty Gibbs (i)	Joe Gibbs Racing	Toyota	0
2	16	A. J. Allmendinger	Kaulig Racing	Chevrolet	9
3	9	Brandon Jones	JR Motorsports	Chevrolet	8
4	00	Cole Custer	Stewart–Haas Racing	Ford	7
5	7	Justin Allgaier	JR Motorsports	Chevrolet	6
6	30	Noah Gragson (i)	Rette Jones Racing	Ford	0
7	98	Riley Herbst	Stewart–Haas Racing	Ford	4
8	20	John Hunter Nemechek (i)	Joe Gibbs Racing	Toyota	0
9	81	Chandler Smith	Joe Gibbs Racing	Toyota	2
10	39	Ryan Sieg	RSS Racing	Ford	1

Stage 2 Laps: 45

Pos.	#	Driver	Team	Make	Pts
1	20	John Hunter Nemechek (i)	Joe Gibbs Racing	Toyota	0
2	16	A. J. Allmendinger	Kaulig Racing	Chevrolet	9
3	00	Cole Custer	Stewart–Haas Racing	Ford	8
4	19	Ty Gibbs (i)	Joe Gibbs Racing	Toyota	0
5	81	Chandler Smith	Joe Gibbs Racing	Toyota	6
6	30	Noah Gragson (i)	Rette Jones Racing	Ford	0
7	2	Jesse Love (R)	Richard Childress Racing	Chevrolet	4
8	9	Brandon Jones	JR Motorsports	Chevrolet	3
9	7	Justin Allgaier	JR Motorsports	Chevrolet	2
10	98	Riley Herbst	Stewart–Haas Racing	Ford	1

Stage 3 Laps: 98

Pos.	St.	#	Driver	Team	Make	Laps	Led	Status	Pts
1	15	20	John Hunter Nemechek (i)	Joe Gibbs Racing	Toyota	188	76	Running	0
2	8	81	Chandler Smith	Joe Gibbs Racing	Toyota	188	0	Running	43
3	38	2	Jesse Love (R)	Richard Childress Racing	Chevrolet	188	0	Running	38
4	5	21	Austin Hill	Richard Childress Racing	Chevrolet	188	0	Running	33
5	7	30	Noah Gragson (i)	Rette Jones Racing	Ford	188	0	Running	0
6	9	98	Riley Herbst	Stewart–Haas Racing	Ford	188	0	Running	36
7	4	16	A. J. Allmendinger	Kaulig Racing	Chevrolet	188	0	Running	48
8	6	7	Justin Allgaier	JR Motorsports	Chevrolet	188	0	Running	37
9	2	00	Cole Custer	Stewart–Haas Racing	Ford	188	64	Running	43
10	24	1	Sam Mayer	JR Motorsports	Chevrolet	188	0	Running	27
11	3	39	Ryan Seig	RSS Racing	Ford	188	0	Running	27
12	30	88	Carson Kvapil	JR Motorsports	Chevrolet	188	0	Running	25
13	13	9	Brandon Jones	JR Motorsports	Chevrolet	188	0	Running	35
14	11	26	Tyler Reddick (i)	Sam Hunt Racing	Toyota	188	0	Running	0
15	28	97	Shane van Gisbergen	Kaulig Racing	Chevrolet	188	0	Running	22
16	10	48	Parker Kilgerman	Big Machine Racing	Chevrolet	188	0	Running	21
17	21	31	Parker Retzlaff	Jorden Anderson Racing	Chevrolet	188	0	Running	20
18	17	5	Anthony Alfredo	Our Motorsports	Chevrolet	188	0	Running	19
19	19	27	Jeb Bruton	Jorden Anderson Racing	Chevrolet	188	0	Running	18
20	1	19	Ty Gibbs (i)	Joe Gibbs Racing	Toyota	188	48	Running	0
21	18	44	Brennan Poole	Alpha Prime Racing	Chevrolet	188	0	Running	16
22	16	51	Jeremy Clements	Jeremy Clements Racing	Chevrolet	188	0	Running	15
23	23	43	Ryan Ellis	Alpha Prime Racing	Chevrolet	188	0	Running	14
24	26	11	Josh Williams	Kaulig Racing	Chevrolet	187	0	Running	13
25	25	42	Leland Honeyman (R)	Young's Motorsports	Chevrolet	187	0	Running	12
26	27	28	Kyle Seig	RSS Racing	Ford	187	0	Running	11
27	20	92	Ross Chastain (i)	DGM Racing	Chevrolet	187	0	Running	0
28	31	15	Hallie Deegan (R)	AM Racing	Ford	187	0	Running	9
29	22	38	Matt DiBenedetto	RSS Racing	Ford	187	0	Running	8
30	12	8	Sammy Smith	JR Motorsports	Chevrolet	187	0	Running	7
31	29	91	Kyle Weatherman	DGM Racing	Chevrolet	186	0	Running	6
32	37	35	Logan Bearden	Joey Gase Motorsports	Chevrolet	185	0	Running	5
33	14	18	Sheldon Creed	Joe Gibbs Racing	Toyota	185	0	Running	4
34	35	14	Chad Finchum	SS-Green Light Racing	Ford	184	0	Running	3
35	34	29	Blaine Perkins	RSS Racing	Ford	184	0	Running	2
36	36	6	Garrett Smithley	JD Motorsports	Chevrolet	183	0	Running	1
37	32	4	Dawson Cram (i)	JD Motorsports	Chevrolet	183	0	Running	0
38	33	07	Patrick Emerling	SS-Green Light Racing	Chevrolet	183	0	Running	1
Official race results

== Standings after the race ==
Drivers' Championship standings

	Pos	Driver	Points
	1	Cole Custer	632
	2	Chandler Smith	617 (-15)
	3	Justin Allgaier	584 (–48)
	4	Austin Hill	554 (–78)
1	5	Riley Herbst	514 (–118)
1	6	Jesse Love	504 (–128)
1	7	A. J. Allmendinger	491 (–141)
3	8	Sheldon Creed	488 (–144)
	9	Parker Kligerman	457 (–175)
	10	Sam Mayer	451 (–181)
	11	Sammy Smith	422 (–210)
	12	Ryan Sieg	411 (–221)
Official driver's standings

Manufacturers' Championship standings

Pos	Manufacturer	Points
1	Chevrolet	597
2	Toyota	574 (-23)
3	Ford	504 (–93)

- Note: Only the first 12 positions are included for the driver standings.

Previous race: 2024 SciAps 200	NASCAR Xfinity Series; 2024 season	Next race: 2024 The Loop 110
