= 2024 Kansas Lottery 300 =

27th race of the 2024 NASCAR Xfinity Series

Race details
- Race 27 of 33 in the 2024 NASCAR Xfinity Series
- Date: September 28, 2024
- Location: Kansas Speedway in Kansas City, Kansas
- Course: Permanent racing facility
- Course length: 1.5 miles (2.4 km)
- Distance: 200 laps, 300 mi (482 km)
- Average speed: 121.036 mph (194.789 km/h)

Pole position
Driver	Brandon Jones	JR Motorsports
- Time: 30.760

Most laps led
Driver	Chandler Smith	Joe Gibbs Racing
- Laps: 114

Winner
No. 20	Aric Almirola	Joe Gibbs Racing

Television in the United States
- Network: The CW
- Announcers: Rick Allen, Jeff Burton, and Steve Letarte.

Radio in the United States
- Radio: MRN

The 2024 Kansas Lottery 300 was the 27th race of the 2024 NASCAR Xfinity Series, the first race of the Round of 12, and the 24th iteration of the event. The race was held on September 28, 2024, at Kansas Speedway in Kansas City, Kansas, a 1.5 miles (2.4 km) permanent quad-oval shaped racetrack. The race took the scheduled 300 laps to complete. In an amazing battle for the lead, Aric Almirola, driving for Joe Gibbs Racing, would make a successful late race pass on Cole Custer, and led the final four laps to earn his sixth career NASCAR Xfinity Series win, and his second of the season. He would also lock the No. 20 team into the next round of the owner's playoffs. Chandler Smith was the most dominant driver of the race, leading a race-high 114 laps before getting passed by Custer and Almirola in the final stages, finishing third.

== Report ==
=== Background ===
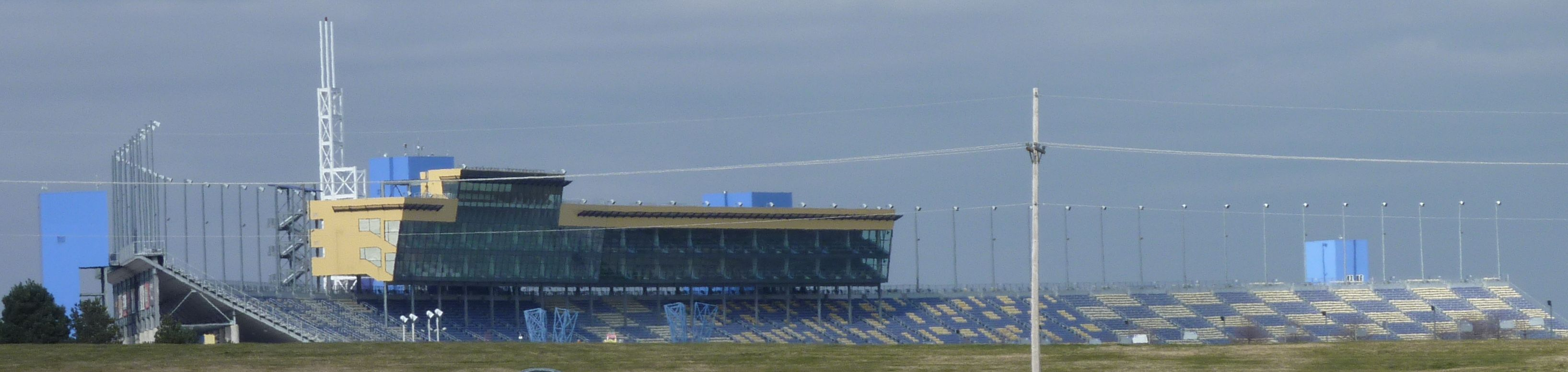
The layout of Kansas Speedway, the venue where the race was held.

Kansas Speedway is a 1.5-mile (2.4 km) tri-oval race track in Kansas City, Kansas. It was built in 2001 and it currently hosts the first playoff race on the schedule. The IndyCar Series also raced at here until 2011. The speedway is owned and operated by the NASCAR.

==== Entry list ====
- (R) denotes rookie driver.
- (i) denotes driver who is ineligible for series driver points.
- (P) denotes playoff driver.
- (OP) denotes owner's playoff car.

#	Driver	Team	Make
00	Cole Custer (P)	Stewart–Haas Racing	Ford
1	Sam Mayer (P)	JR Motorsports	Chevrolet
2	Jesse Love (R) (P)	Richard Childress Racing	Chevrolet
5	Anthony Alfredo	Our Motorsports	Chevrolet
07	Patrick Emerling	SS-Green Light Racing	Chevrolet
7	Justin Allgaier (P)	JR Motorsports	Chevrolet
8	Sammy Smith (P)	JR Motorsports	Chevrolet
9	Brandon Jones	JR Motorsports	Chevrolet
10	Daniel Dye (i)	Kaulig Racing	Chevrolet
11	Josh Williams	Kaulig Racing	Chevrolet
14	J. J. Yeley	SS-Green Light Racing	Ford
15	Logan Bearden	AM Racing	Ford
16	A. J. Allmendinger (P)	Kaulig Racing	Chevrolet
18	Sheldon Creed (P)	Joe Gibbs Racing	Toyota
19	Taylor Gray (i)	Joe Gibbs Racing	Toyota
20	Aric Almirola (OP)	Joe Gibbs Racing	Toyota
21	Austin Hill (P)	Richard Childress Racing	Chevrolet
26	Corey Heim (i)	Sam Hunt Racing	Toyota
27	Jeb Burton	Jordan Anderson Racing	Chevrolet
28	Kyle Sieg	RSS Racing	Ford
29	Blaine Perkins	RSS Racing	Ford
31	Parker Retzlaff	Jordan Anderson Racing	Chevrolet
35	Joey Gase	Joey Gase Motorsports	Chevrolet
38	Matt DiBenedetto	RSS Racing	Ford
39	Ryan Sieg	RSS Racing	Ford
42	Leland Honeyman (R)	Young's Motorsports	Chevrolet
43	Ryan Ellis	Alpha Prime Racing	Chevrolet
44	Brennan Poole	Alpha Prime Racing	Chevrolet
45	Brad Perez	Alpha Prime Racing	Chevrolet
48	Parker Kligerman (P)	Big Machine Racing	Chevrolet
51	Jeremy Clements	Jeremy Clements Racing	Chevrolet
74	Ryan Vargas	Mike Harmon Racing	Chevrolet
81	Chandler Smith (P)	Joe Gibbs Racing	Toyota
88	Connor Zilisch	JR Motorsports	Chevrolet
91	Kyle Weatherman	DGM Racing	Chevrolet
92	Dawson Cram (i)	DGM Racing	Chevrolet
97	Shane van Gisbergen (R) (P)	Kaulig Racing	Chevrolet
98	Riley Herbst (P)	Stewart–Haas Racing	Ford
Official entry list

== Practice ==
The first and only practice session was held on Friday, September 28, at 11:05 AM CST, and would last for 20 minutes. Connor Zilisch, driving for JR Motorsports, would set the fastest time in the session, with a lap of 31.434, and a speed of 171.789 mph (276.468 km/h).

Pos.	#	Driver	Team	Make	Time	Speed
1	88	Connor Zilisch	JR Motorsports	Chevrolet	31.434	171.789
2	19	Taylor Gray (i)	Joe Gibbs Racing	Toyota	31.448	171.712
3	27	Jeb Burton	Jordan Anderson Racing	Chevrolet	31.449	171.707
Full practice results

== Qualifying ==
Qualifying was held on Saturday, September 28, at 11:35 AM CST. Since Kansas Speedway is an intermediate racetrack, the qualifying system used is a single-car, one-lap system with only one round. Drivers will be on track by themselves and will have one lap to post a qualifying time, and whoever sets the fastest time will win the pole.

Brandon Jones, driving for JR Motorsports, would score the pole for the race, with a lap of 30.760, and a speed of 175.553 mph (282.525 km/h).

No drivers would fail to qualify.

=== Qualifying results ===
Pos.	#	Driver	Team	Make	Time	Speed
1	9	Brandon Jones	JR Motorsports	Chevrolet	30.760	175.553
2	81	Chandler Smith (P)	Joe Gibbs Racing	Toyota	30.806	175.291
3	00	Cole Custer (P)	Stewart–Haas Racing	Ford	30.856	175.006
4	88	Connor Zilisch	JR Motorsports	Chevrolet	30.885	174.842
5	1	Sam Mayer (P)	JR Motorsports	Chevrolet	30.896	174.780
6	20	Aric Almirola (OP)	Joe Gibbs Racing	Toyota	30.980	174.306
7	2	Jesse Love (R) (P)	Richard Childress Racing	Chevrolet	31.005	174.165
8	48	Parker Kligerman (P)	Big Machine Racing	Chevrolet	31.021	174.076
9	7	Justin Allgaier (P)	JR Motorsports	Chevrolet	31.034	174.003
10	21	Austin Hill (P)	Richard Childress Racing	Chevrolet	31.065	173.829
11	19	Taylor Gray (i)	Joe Gibbs Racing	Toyota	31.117	173.539
12	39	Ryan Sieg	RSS Racing	Ford	31.135	173.438
13	8	Sammy Smith (P)	JR Motorsports	Chevrolet	31.239	172.861
14	16	A. J. Allmendinger (P)	Kaulig Racing	Chevrolet	31.263	172.728
15	18	Sheldon Creed (P)	Joe Gibbs Racing	Toyota	31.334	172.337
16	98	Riley Herbst (P)	Stewart–Haas Racing	Ford	31.413	171.903
17	26	Corey Heim (i)	Sam Hunt Racing	Toyota	31.557	171.119
18	11	Josh Williams	Kaulig Racing	Chevrolet	31.572	171.038
19	27	Jeb Burton	Jordan Anderson Racing	Chevrolet	31.595	170.913
20	5	Anthony Alfredo	Our Motorsports	Chevrolet	31.638	170.681
21	28	Kyle Sieg	RSS Racing	Ford	31.651	170.611
22	97	Shane van Gisbergen (R) (P)	Kaulig Racing	Chevrolet	31.708	170.304
23	31	Parker Retzlaff	Jordan Anderson Racing	Chevrolet	31.731	170.181
24	38	Matt DiBenedetto	RSS Racing	Ford	31.748	170.089
25	14	J. J. Yeley	SS-Green Light Racing	Ford	32.000	168.750
26	51	Jeremy Clements	Jeremy Clements Racing	Chevrolet	32.013	168.681
27	92	Dawson Cram (i)	DGM Racing	Chevrolet	32.022	168.634
28	44	Brennan Poole	Alpha Prime Racing	Chevrolet	32.035	168.566
29	43	Ryan Ellis	Alpha Prime Racing	Chevrolet	32.037	168.555
30	10	Daniel Dye (i)	Kaulig Racing	Chevrolet	32.038	168.550
31	15	Logan Bearden	AM Racing	Ford	32.072	168.371
32	29	Blaine Perkins	RSS Racing	Ford	32.273	167.323
33	91	Kyle Weatherman	DGM Racing	Chevrolet	32.437	166.477
Qualified by owner's points
34	35	Joey Gase	Joey Gase Motorsports	Chevrolet	32.463	166.343
35	07	Patrick Emerling	SS-Green Light Racing	Chevrolet	32.486	166.225
36	74	Ryan Vargas	Mike Harmon Racing	Chevrolet	32.906	164.104
37	45	Brad Perez	Alpha Prime Racing	Chevrolet	–	–
38	42	Leland Honeyman (R)	Young's Motorsports	Chevrolet	–	–
Official qualifying results
Official starting lineup

== Race results ==
Stage 1 Laps: 45

Pos.	#	Driver	Team	Make	Pts
1	20	Aric Almirola (OP)	Joe Gibbs Racing	Toyota	10
2	81	Chandler Smith (P)	Joe Gibbs Racing	Toyota	9
3	00	Cole Custer (P)	Stewart–Haas Racing	Ford	8
4	9	Brandon Jones	JR Motorsports	Chevrolet	7
5	1	Sam Mayer (P)	JR Motorsports	Chevrolet	6
6	18	Sheldon Creed (P)	Joe Gibbs Racing	Toyota	5
7	21	Austin Hill (P)	Richard Childress Racing	Chevrolet	4
8	7	Justin Allgaier (P)	JR Motorsports	Chevrolet	3
9	98	Riley Herbst (P)	Stewart–Haas Racing	Ford	2
10	48	Parker Kligerman (P)	Big Machine Racing	Chevrolet	1

Stage 2 Laps: 45

Pos.	#	Driver	Team	Make	Pts
1	1	Sam Mayer (P)	JR Motorsports	Chevrolet	10
2	20	Aric Almirola (OP)	Joe Gibbs Racing	Toyota	9
3	00	Cole Custer (P)	Stewart–Haas Racing	Ford	8
4	81	Chandler Smith (P)	Joe Gibbs Racing	Toyota	7
5	88	Connor Zilisch	JR Motorsports	Chevrolet	6
6	21	Austin Hill (P)	Richard Childress Racing	Chevrolet	5
7	18	Sheldon Creed (P)	Joe Gibbs Racing	Toyota	4
8	9	Brandon Jones	JR Motorsports	Chevrolet	3
8	38	Matt DiBenedetto	RSS Racing	Ford	2
10	39	Ryan Sieg	RSS Racing	Ford	1

Stage 3 Laps: 110

Pos.	St	#	Driver	Team	Make	Laps	Led	Status	Pts
1	6	20	Aric Almirola (OP)	Joe Gibbs Racing	Toyota	200	16	Running	59
2	3	00	Cole Custer (P)	Stewart–Haas Racing	Ford	200	48	Running	51
3	2	81	Chandler Smith (P)	Joe Gibbs Racing	Toyota	200	114	Running	50
4	4	88	Connor Zilisch	JR Motorsports	Chevrolet	200	0	Running	39
5	15	18	Sheldon Creed (P)	Joe Gibbs Racing	Toyota	200	0	Running	41
6	1	9	Brandon Jones	JR Motorsports	Chevrolet	200	4	Running	41
7	10	21	Austin Hill (P)	Richard Childress Racing	Chevrolet	200	0	Running	39
8	22	97	Shane van Gisbergen (R) (P)	Kaulig Racing	Chevrolet	200	0	Running	29
9	7	2	Jesse Love (R) (P)	Richard Childress Racing	Chevrolet	200	0	Running	28
10	16	98	Riley Herbst (P)	Stewart–Haas Racing	Ford	200	0	Running	29
11	18	11	Josh Williams	Kaulig Racing	Chevrolet	200	0	Running	26
12	8	48	Parker Kligerman (P)	Big Machine Racing	Chevrolet	200	0	Running	26
13	5	1	Sam Mayer (P)	JR Motorsports	Chevrolet	200	18	Running	40
14	24	38	Matt DiBenedetto	RSS Racing	Ford	200	0	Running	25
15	20	5	Anthony Alfredo	Our Motorsports	Chevrolet	200	0	Running	22
16	12	39	Ryan Sieg	RSS Racing	Ford	200	0	Running	22
17	14	16	A. J. Allmendinger (P)	Kaulig Racing	Chevrolet	199	0	Running	20
18	28	44	Brennan Poole	Alpha Prime Racing	Chevrolet	199	0	Running	19
19	29	43	Ryan Ellis	Alpha Prime Racing	Chevrolet	199	0	Running	18
20	25	14	J. J. Yeley	SS-Green Light Racing	Ford	199	0	Running	17
21	23	31	Parker Retzlaff	Jordan Anderson Racing	Chevrolet	199	0	Running	16
22	13	8	Sammy Smith (P)	JR Motorsports	Chevrolet	199	0	Running	15
23	19	27	Jeb Burton	Jordan Anderson Racing	Chevrolet	198	0	Running	14
24	21	28	Kyle Sieg	RSS Racing	Ford	198	0	Running	13
25	38	42	Leland Honeyman (R)	Young's Motorsports	Chevrolet	198	0	Running	12
26	33	91	Kyle Weatherman	DGM Racing	Chevrolet	197	0	Running	11
27	26	51	Jeremy Clements	Jeremy Clements Racing	Chevrolet	197	0	Running	10
28	32	29	Blaine Perkins	RSS Racing	Ford	197	0	Running	9
29	36	74	Ryan Vargas	Mike Harmon Racing	Chevrolet	196	0	Running	8
30	35	07	Patrick Emerling	SS-Green Light Racing	Chevrolet	196	0	Running	7
31	17	26	Corey Heim (i)	Sam Hunt Racing	Toyota	195	0	Running	0
32	34	35	Joey Gase	Joey Gase Motorsports	Chevrolet	194	0	Running	5
33	31	15	Logan Bearden	AM Racing	Ford	190	0	Running	4
34	30	10	Daniel Dye (i)	Kaulig Racing	Chevrolet	189	0	Running	0
35	27	92	Dawson Cram (i)	DGM Racing	Chevrolet	174	0	Fuel Pressure	0
36	9	7	Justin Allgaier (P)	JR Motorsports	Chevrolet	73	0	Accident	4
37	37	45	Brad Perez	Alpha Prime Racing	Chevrolet	61	0	Oil Pump	1
38	11	19	Taylor Gray (i)	Joe Gibbs Racing	Toyota	45	0	Engine	0
Official race results

== Standings after the race ==
Drivers' Championship standings

	Pos	Driver	Points
1	1	Cole Custer	2,079
2	2	Chandler Smith	2,074 (-5)
	3	Austin Hill	2,064 (–15)
3	4	Sam Mayer	2,051 (–28)
4	5	Sheldon Creed	2,048 (–31)
1	6	Shane van Gisbergen	2,046 (–33)
1	7	Jesse Love	2,041 (–38)
	8	Riley Herbst	2,039 (–40)
8	9	Justin Allgaier	2,038 (–41)
	10	A. J. Allmendinger	2,026 (–53)
1	11	Parker Kligerman	2,024 (–55)
1	12	Sammy Smith	2,016 (–63)
Official driver's standings

Manufacturers' Championship standings

Pos	Manufacturer	Points
1	Chevrolet	998
2	Toyota	966 (-32)
3	Ford	870 (–128)

- Note: Only the first 12 positions are included for the driver standings.

Previous race: 2024 Food City 300	NASCAR Xfinity Series; 2024 season	Next race: 2024 United Rentals 250
