= 2024 Crown Royal Purple Bag Project 200 =

11th race of the 2024 NASCAR Xfinity Series

Race details
- Race 11 of 33 of the 2024 NASCAR Xfinity Series
- Date: May 11, 2024
- Official name: 4th Annual Crown Royal Purple Bag Project 200
- Location: Darlington Raceway in Darlington, South Carolina
- Course: Permanent racing facility
- Course length: 1.366 miles (2.198 km)
- Distance: 147 laps, 200 mi (323 km)
- Scheduled distance: 147 laps, 200 mi (323 km)
- Average speed: 110.567 mph (177.940 km/h)

Pole position
Driver	Cole Custer	Stewart–Haas Racing
- Grid positions set by competition-based formula

Most laps led
Driver	Justin Allgaier	JR Motorsports
- Laps: 119

Winner
No. 7	Justin Allgaier	JR Motorsports

Television in the United States
- Network: FS1
- Announcers: Adam Alexander, Joey Logano, and Brad Keselowski

Radio in the United States
- Radio: MRN

The 2024 Crown Royal Purple Bag Project 200 was the 11th stock car race of the 2024 NASCAR Xfinity Series, and the 42nd iteration of the event. The race was held on Saturday, May 11, 2024, in Darlington, South Carolina at Darlington Raceway, a 1.366 miles (2.198 km) permanent asphalt egg-shaped speedway. The race took the scheduled 147 laps to complete. Justin Allgaier, driving for JR Motorsports, would put on a blistering performance, winning both stages and leading a race-high 119 laps to earn his 24th career NASCAR Xfinity Series win, and his first of the season. With his win, he ties with Dale Earnhardt Jr. for the 10th most wins in Xfinity Series history. To fill out the podium, Austin Hill, driving for Richard Childress Racing, and Cole Custer, driving for Stewart–Haas Racing, would finish 2nd and 3rd, respectively.

== Report ==
=== Background ===
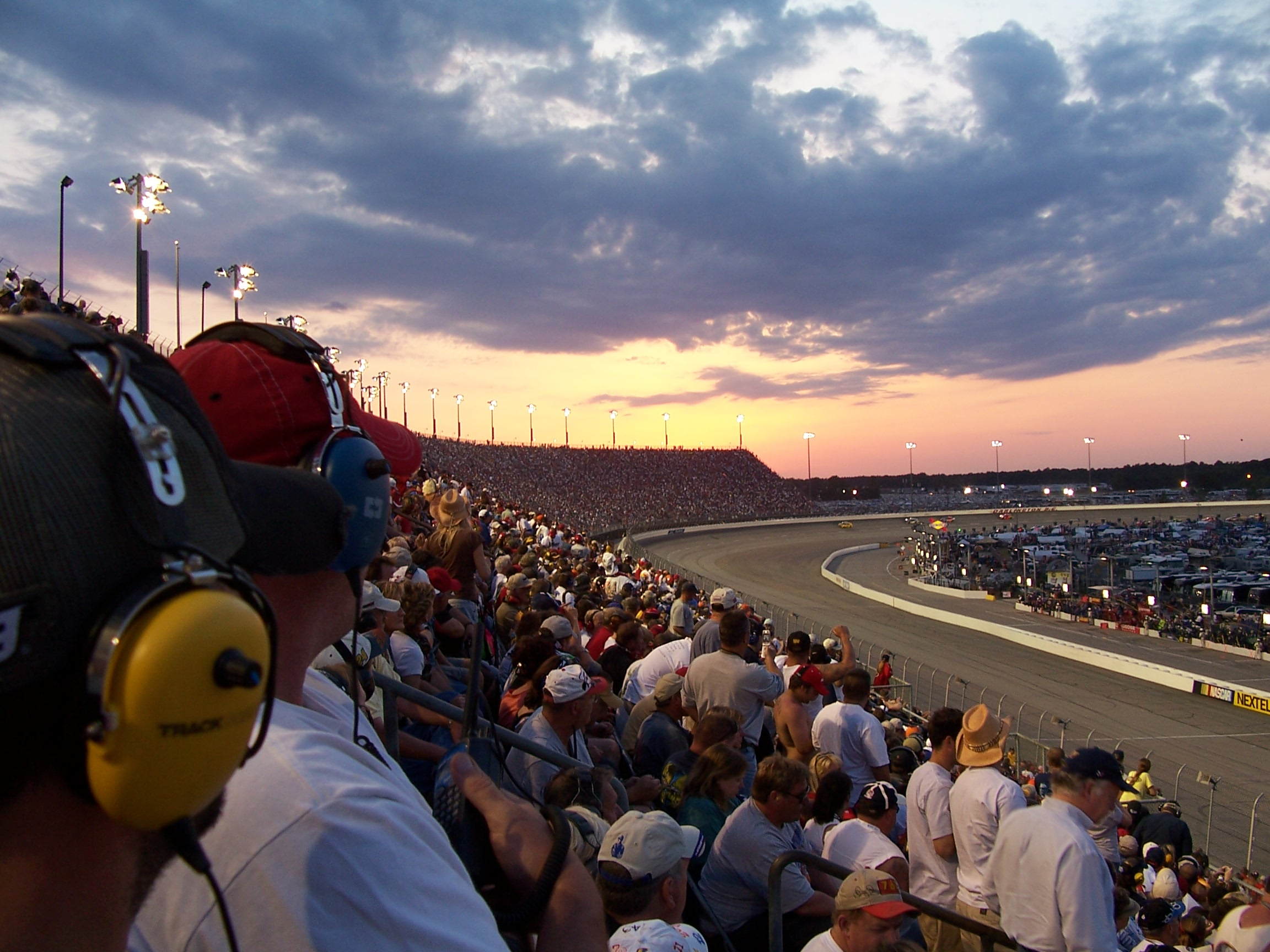
Darlington Raceway, the circuit where the race was held.

Darlington Raceway is a race track built for NASCAR racing located near Darlington, South Carolina. It is nicknamed "The Lady in Black" and "The Track Too Tough to Tame" by many NASCAR fans and drivers and advertised as "A NASCAR Tradition." It is of a unique, somewhat egg-shaped design, an oval with the ends of very different configurations, a condition which supposedly arose from the proximity of one end of the track to a minnow pond the owner refused to relocate. This situation makes it very challenging for the crews to set up their cars' handling in a way that is effective at both ends.

Since 2015, the race has hosted NASCAR's Throwback weekend, which features cars sporting paint schemes that pay homage to past teams and drivers. (The lineage of this race includes races billed as the Southern 500 from 2005 to 2020.)

=== Entry list ===
- (R) denotes rookie driver.
- (i) denotes driver who is ineligible for series driver points.

#	Driver	Team	Make	Sponsor or throwback
00	Cole Custer	Stewart–Haas Racing	Ford	Haas Automation – Johnny Sauter's 2006 No. 00 Yellow Transportation paint scheme.
1	Sam Mayer	JR Motorsports	Chevrolet	RTIC Outdoors
2	Jesse Love (R)	Richard Childress Racing	Chevrolet	Whelen
4	Dawson Cram (R)	JD Motorsports	Chevrolet	Prolube Oil – Paul Wireman's street stock paint scheme.
5	Anthony Alfredo	Our Motorsports	Chevrolet	Chevrolet Accessories
6	Garrett Smithley	JD Motorsports	Chevrolet	JD Motorsports
07	Patrick Emerling	SS-Green Light Racing	Chevrolet	Liberty Brew Coffee – Jan Leaty's 1996 Spring Sizzler modified paint scheme.
7	Justin Allgaier	JR Motorsports	Chevrolet	BRANDT Heritage – 1949 BRANDT retro scheme.
8	Sammy Smith	JR Motorsports	Chevrolet	TMC Transportation – Mike Brooks' 1980 sprint car paint scheme.
9	Brandon Jones	JR Motorsports	Chevrolet	Bali / Menards – Dale Earnhardt Jr.'s 2018 No. 88 Hellmann's paint scheme.
11	Josh Williams	Kaulig Racing	Chevrolet	Call811.com
14	David Starr	SS-Green Light Racing	Ford	SHAR
15	Hailie Deegan (R)	AM Racing	Ford	AirBox – Dale Earnhardt's 1982 No. 15 Wrangler paint scheme.
16	A. J. Allmendinger	Kaulig Racing	Chevrolet	LeafFilter Gutter Protection
17	William Byron (i)	Hendrick Motorsports	Chevrolet	HendrickCars.com
18	Sheldon Creed	Joe Gibbs Racing	Toyota	Toyota – Ivan Stewart's off-road truck paint scheme.
19	Taylor Gray (i)	Joe Gibbs Racing	Toyota	Operation 300
20	Aric Almirola	Joe Gibbs Racing	Toyota	He Gets Us
21	Austin Hill	Richard Childress Racing	Chevrolet	Bennett Transportation – Throwback scheme resembling Bennett trucks from the 1980s.
26	John Hunter Nemechek (i)	Sam Hunt Racing	Toyota	Toyota Racing Development
27	Jeb Burton	Jordan Anderson Racing	Chevrolet	Capital City Towing
28	Kyle Sieg	RSS Racing	Ford	RSS Racing
29	Blaine Perkins	RSS Racing	Ford	To The Point – Cale Yarborough's 1988 No. 29 Hardee's paint scheme.
31	Parker Retzlaff	Jordan Anderson Racing	Chevrolet	FUNKAWAY – Harry Gant's 1991 No. 33 Skoal paint scheme.
35	Chad Finchum	Joey Gase Motorsports	Chevrolet	Garrison Homes / Adkins Automotive – Kevin Harvick's 2001 No. 29 GM Goodwrench paint scheme.
38	Matt DiBenedetto	RSS Racing	Ford	Viking Motorsports
39	Ryan Sieg	RSS Racing	Ford	Sci Aps
42	Leland Honeyman (R)	Young's Motorsports	Chevrolet	Young's Building Systems / Randco – Kyle Petty's 1993 No. 42 Mello Yello paint scheme.
43	Ryan Ellis	Alpha Prime Racing	Chevrolet	Classic Collision – Cole Trickle's paint scheme from Days of Thunder.
44	Brennan Poole	Alpha Prime Racing	Chevrolet	CW & Sons Infrastructure – Kyle Petty's 1997 No. 44 Hot Wheels paint scheme.
48	Parker Kligerman	Big Machine Racing	Chevrolet	Big Machine Spiked Light Coolers – Scott Borchetta's No. 98 super truck paint scheme.
51	Jeremy Clements	Jeremy Clements Racing	Chevrolet	Alliance Driveaway Solutions – Robert Pressley's 1989-93 No. 59 Alliance paint scheme.
81	Chandler Smith	Joe Gibbs Racing	Toyota	Smith General Contracting – Smith's 2017 No. 26 Super Late Model paint scheme.
88	Carson Kvapil	JR Motorsports	Chevrolet	Clarience Technologies
91	Kyle Weatherman	DGM Racing	Chevrolet	Drive Smart Warranty
92	Josh Bilicki	DGM Racing	Chevrolet	Circle B Diecast – Justin Allgaier's 2014 No. 51 Plan B Sales paint scheme.
97	Shane van Gisbergen (R)	Kaulig Racing	Chevrolet	Quad Lock – Marcos Ambrose's 2011 No. 9 DeWalt/Stanley paint scheme.
98	Riley Herbst	Stewart–Haas Racing	Ford	Terrible Herbst – Jerry Herbst's off-road truggy paint scheme.
Official entry list

== Starting lineup ==
Practice and qualifying was originally scheduled to be held on Friday, May 10, at 5:05 PM and 5:35 PM EST, but were both cancelled due to constant rain showers. The starting lineup would be determined per the NASCAR rulebook. As a result, Cole Custer, driving for Stewart–Haas Racing, will start on the pole.

No drivers would fail to qualify.

=== Starting lineup ===
Pos.	#	Driver	Team	Make
1	00	Cole Custer	Stewart–Haas Racing	Ford
2	81	Chandler Smith	Joe Gibbs Racing	Toyota
3	18	Sheldon Creed	Joe Gibbs Racing	Toyota
4	16	A. J. Allmendinger	Kaulig Racing	Chevrolet
5	21	Austin Hill	Richard Childress Racing	Chevrolet
6	1	Sam Mayer	JR Motorsports	Chevrolet
7	7	Justin Allgaier	JR Motorsports	Chevrolet
8	5	Anthony Alfredo	Our Motorsports	Chevrolet
9	98	Riley Herbst	Stewart–Haas Racing	Ford
10	31	Parker Retzlaff	Jordan Anderson Racing	Chevrolet
11	48	Parker Kligerman	Big Machine Racing	Chevrolet
12	2	Jesse Love (R)	Richard Childress Racing	Chevrolet
13	88	Carson Kvapil	JR Motorsports	Chevrolet
14	9	Brandon Jones	JR Motorsports	Chevrolet
15	91	Kyle Weatherman	DGM Racing	Chevrolet
16	27	Jeb Burton	Jordan Anderson Racing	Chevrolet
17	97	Shane van Gisbergen (R)	Kaulig Racing	Chevrolet
18	20	Aric Almirola	Joe Gibbs Racing	Toyota
19	51	Jeremy Clements	Jeremy Clements Racing	Chevrolet
20	43	Ryan Ellis	Alpha Prime Racing	Chevrolet
21	44	Brennan Poole	Alpha Prime Racing	Chevrolet
22	42	Leland Honeyman (R)	Young's Motorsports	Chevrolet
23	8	Sammy Smith	JR Motorsports	Chevrolet
24	19	Taylor Gray (i)	Joe Gibbs Racing	Toyota
25	11	Josh Williams	Kaulig Racing	Chevrolet
26	39	Ryan Sieg	RSS Racing	Ford
27	14	David Starr	SS-Green Light Racing	Ford
28	07	Patrick Emerling	SS-Green Light Racing	Chevrolet
29	28	Kyle Sieg	RSS Racing	Ford
30	92	Josh Bilicki	DGM Racing	Chevrolet
31	38	Matt DiBenedetto	RSS Racing	Ford
32	15	Hailie Deegan (R)	AM Racing	Ford
33	4	Dawson Cram (R)	JD Motorsports	Chevrolet
Qualified by owner's points
34	26	John Hunter Nemechek (i)	Sam Hunt Racing	Toyota
35	6	Garrett Smithley	JD Motorsports	Chevrolet
36	29	Blaine Perkins	RSS Racing	Ford
37	35	Chad Finchum	Joey Gase Motorsports	Chevrolet
38	17	William Byron (i)	Hendrick Motorsports	Chevrolet
Official starting lineup

== Race results ==
Stage 1 Laps: 45

Pos.	#	Driver	Team	Make	Pts
1	7	Justin Allgaier	JR Motorsports	Chevrolet	10
2	21	Austin Hill	Richard Childress Racing	Chevrolet	9
3	1	Sam Mayer	JR Motorsports	Chevrolet	8
4	16	A. J. Allmendinger	Kaulig Racing	Chevrolet	7
5	48	Parker Kilgerman	Big Machine Racing	Chevrolet	6
6	81	Chandler Smith	Joe Gibbs Racing	Toyota	5
7	20	Aric Almirola	Joe Gibbs Racing	Toyota	4
8	2	Jesse Love	Richard Childress Racing	Chevrolet	3
9	98	Riley Herbst	Stewart–Haas Racing	Ford	2
10	18	Sheldon Creed	Joe Gibbs Racing	Toyota	1

Stage 2 Laps: 45

Pos.	#	Driver	Team	Make	Pts
1	7	Justin Allgaier	JR Motorsports	Chevrolet	10
2	21	Austin Hill	Richard Childress Racing	Chevrolet	9
3	48	Parker Kilgerman	Big Machine Racing	Chevrolet	8
4	1	Sam Mayer	JR Motorsports	Chevrolet	7
5	20	Aric Almirola	Joe Gibbs Racing	Toyota	6
6	16	A. J. Allmendinger	Kaulig Racing	Chevrolet	5
7	2	Jesse Love	Richard Childress Racing	Chevrolet	4
8	9	Brandon Jones	JR Motorsports	Chevrolet	3
9	98	Riley Herbst	Stewart–Haas Racing	Ford	2
10	81	Chandler Smith	Joe Gibbs Racing	Toyota	1

Stage 3 Laps: 57

Pos.	St	#	Driver	Team	Make	Laps	Led	Status	Pts
1	7	7	Justin Allgaier	JR Motorsports	Chevrolet	147	119	Running	60
2	5	21	Austin Hill	Richard Childress Racing	Chevrolet	147	6	Running	53
3	1	00	Cole Custer	Stewart–Haas Racing	Chevrolet	147	21	Running	34
4	6	1	Sam Mayer	JR Motorsports	Chevrolet	147	0	Running	48
5	18	20	Aric Almirola	Joe Gibbs Racing	Toyota	147	0	Running	42
6	11	48	Parker Kilgerman	Big Machine Racing	Chevrolet	147	0	Running	45
7	9	98	Riley Herbst	Stewart–Haas Racing	Ford	147	0	Running	34
8	12	2	Jesse Love (R)	Richard Childress Racing	Chevrolet	147	0	Running	36
9	3	18	Sheldon Creed	Joe Gibbs Racing	Toyota	147	0	Running	29
10	14	9	Brandon Jones	JR Motorsports	Chevrolet	147	0	Running	30
11	38	17	William Byron (i)	Hendrick Motorsports	Chevrolet	147	0	Running	0
12	2	81	Chandler Smith	Joe Gibbs Racing	Toyota	147	0	Running	31
13	26	39	Ryan Sieg	RSS Racing	Ford	147	0	Running	24
14	8	5	Anthony Alfredo	Our Motorsports	Chevrolet	147	0	Running	23
15	17	97	Shane van Gisbergen (R)	Kaulig Racing	Chevrolet	147	0	Running	22
16	16	27	Jeb Burton	Jordan Anderson Racing	Chevrolet	147	0	Running	21
17	15	91	Kyle Weatherman	DGM Racing	Chevrolet	147	0	Running	20
18	24	19	Taylor Gray (i)	Joe Gibbs Racing	Toyota	147	0	Running	0
19	13	88	Carson Kvapil	JR Motorsports	Chevrolet	147	0	Running	18
20	21	44	Brennan Poole	Alpha Prime Racing	Chevrolet	147	0	Running	17
21	25	11	Josh Williams	Kaulig Racing	Chevrolet	147	0	Running	16
22	30	92	Josh Bilicki	DGM Racing	Chevrolet	147	0	Running	15
23	34	26	John Hunter Nemechek (i)	Sam Hunt Racing	Toyota	147	0	Running	0
24	27	14	David Starr	SS-Green Light Racing	Ford	147	0	Running	13
25	31	38	Matt DiBenedetto	RSS Racing	Ford	147	0	Running	12
26	37	35	Chad Finchum	Joey Gase Motorsports	Chevrolet	147	0	Running	11
27	36	29	Blaine Perkins	RSS Racing	Ford	147	0	Running	10
28	33	4	Dawson Cram (R)	JD Motorsports	Chevrolet	147	0	Running	9
29	35	6	Garrett Smithley	JD Motorsports	Chevrolet	147	0	Running	8
30	22	42	Leland Honeyman (R)	Young's Motorsports	Chevrolet	146	0	Running	7
31	10	31	Parker Retzlaff	Jordan Anderson Racing	Chevrolet	146	0	Running	6
32	29	28	Kyle Sieg	RSS Racing	Ford	146	0	Running	5
33	28	07	Patrick Emerling	SS-Green Light Racing	Chevrolet	146	0	Running	4
34	23	8	Sammy Smith	JR Motorsports	Chevrolet	146	0	Running	3
35	4	16	A. J. Allmendinger	Kaulig Racing	Chevrolet	126	1	Running	14
36	32	15	Hailie Deegan (R)	AM Racing	Ford	102	0	Accident	1
37	19	51	Jeremy Clements	Jeremy Clements Racing	Chevrolet	94	0	Running	1
38	20	43	Ryan Ellis	Alpha Prime Racing	Chevrolet	71	0	Drive Shaft	1
Official race results

== Standings after the race ==
Drivers' Championship standings

	Pos	Driver	Points
2	1	Austin Hill	430
	2	Cole Custer	427 (-3)
2	3	Chandler Smith	425 (–5)
	4	Jesse Love	373 (–57)
	5	Justin Allgaier	373 (–57)
	6	Riley Herbst	337 (–93)
	7	A. J. Allmendinger	309 (–121)
	8	Sheldon Creed	306 (–124)
	9	Parker Kligerman	306 (–124)
	10	Anthony Alfredo	270 (–160)
3	11	Sam Mayer	264 (–166)
	12	Brandon Jones	262 (–168)
Official driver's standings

Manufacturers' Championship standings

Pos	Manufacturer	Points
1	Chevrolet	410
2	Toyota	397 (–13)
3	Ford	341 (–69)

- Note: Only the first 12 positions are included for the driver standings.

Previous race: 2024 BetRivers 200	NASCAR Xfinity Series; 2024 season	Next race: 2024 BetMGM 300
