= 2024 Ag-Pro 300 =

9th race of the 2024 NASCAR Xfinity Series

Race details
- Race 9 of 33 of the 2024 NASCAR Xfinity Series
- Date: April 20, 2024
- Official name: 33rd Annual Ag-Pro 300
- Location: Talladega Superspeedway in Lincoln, Alabama
- Course: Permanent racing facility
- Course length: 2.66 miles (4.28 km)
- Distance: 124 laps, 329 mi (529 km)
- Scheduled distance: 113 laps, 300 mi (483 km)
- Average speed: 131.323 mph (211.344 km/h)

Pole position
Driver	Austin Hill	Richard Childress Racing
- Time: 52.723

Most laps led
Driver	Austin Hill	Richard Childress Racing
- Laps: 41

Winner
No. 2	Jesse Love	Richard Childress Racing

Television in the United States
- Network: Fox
- Announcers: Adam Alexander, Ryan Blaney, and Daniel Suárez

Radio in the United States
- Radio: MRN

The 2024 Ag-Pro 300 was the 9th stock car race of the 2024 NASCAR Xfinity Series, and the 33rd iteration of the event. The race was held on Saturday, April 20, 2024, at Talladega Superspeedway in Lincoln, Alabama, a 2.66 miles (4.28 km) permanent asphalt quad-oval shaped superspeedway. The race was originally scheduled to be contested over 113 laps, but was increased to 124 laps due to numerous NASCAR overtime attempts. In an action packed race with numerous lead changes, Jesse Love, driving for Richard Childress Racing, would take advantage of the lead on an overtime restart, and held off the field to earn his first career NASCAR Xfinity Series win in his ninth career start. RCR continued to show their dominance at superspeedways, with Austin Hill leading a race-high 41 laps and Love leading 28 laps. Hill was involved in a wreck in the late stages, and ultimately finished 14th. To fill out the podium, Riley Herbst, driving for Stewart–Haas Racing, and Anthony Alfredo, driving for Our Motorsports, would finish 2nd and 3rd, respectively.

This was also the third race of the Dash 4 Cash. Drivers who were eligible for the Dash 4 Cash were Sam Mayer, Ryan Sieg, Justin Allgaier, and A. J. Allmendinger, since they were the highest finishing Xfinity Series regulars following the race at Texas. Sieg would claim the $100K bonus cash after finishing 17th, two positions ahead of his closest competitor, A. J. Allmendinger.

== Report ==
=== Background ===
Talladega Superspeedway, the circuit where the race will be held.

Talladega Superspeedway, formerly known as Alabama International Motor Speedway, is a motorsports complex located north of Talladega, Alabama. It is located on the former Anniston Air Force Base in the small city of Lincoln. A tri-oval, the track was constructed in 1969 by the International Speedway Corporation, a business controlled by the France family. Talladega is most known for its steep banking. The track currently hosts NASCAR's Cup Series, Xfinity Series and Craftsman Truck Series. Talladega is the longest NASCAR oval with a length of 2.66-mile-long (4.28 km) tri-oval like the Daytona International Speedway, which is 2.5-mile-long (4.0 km).

==== Entry list ====
- (R) denotes rookie driver.
- (i) denotes driver who is ineligible for series driver points.

#	Driver	Team	Make
00	Cole Custer	Stewart–Haas Racing	Ford
1	Sam Mayer	JR Motorsports	Chevrolet
2	Jesse Love (R)	Richard Childress Racing	Chevrolet
4	Dawson Cram (R)	JD Motorsports	Chevrolet
5	Anthony Alfredo	Our Motorsports	Chevrolet
6	Garrett Smithley	JD Motorsports	Chevrolet
07	Patrick Emerling	SS-Green Light Racing	Chevrolet
7	Justin Allgaier	JR Motorsports	Chevrolet
8	Sammy Smith	JR Motorsports	Chevrolet
9	Brandon Jones	JR Motorsports	Chevrolet
11	Josh Williams	Kaulig Racing	Chevrolet
14	Mason Massey (i)	SS-Green Light Racing	Chevrolet
15	Hailie Deegan (R)	AM Racing	Ford
16	A. J. Allmendinger	Kaulig Racing	Chevrolet
18	Sheldon Creed	Joe Gibbs Racing	Toyota
19	Taylor Gray (i)	Joe Gibbs Racing	Toyota
20	Ryan Truex	Joe Gibbs Racing	Toyota
21	Austin Hill	Richard Childress Racing	Chevrolet
26	Jeffrey Earnhardt	Sam Hunt Racing	Toyota
27	Jeb Burton	Jordan Anderson Racing	Chevrolet
28	Kyle Sieg	RSS Racing	Ford
29	Blaine Perkins	RSS Racing	Ford
31	Parker Retzlaff	Jordan Anderson Racing	Chevrolet
32	Jordan Anderson	Jordan Anderson Racing	Chevrolet
35	Joey Gase	Joey Gase Motorsports	Chevrolet
38	Matt DiBenedetto	RSS Racing	Ford
39	Ryan Sieg	RSS Racing	Ford
42	Leland Honeyman (R)	Young's Motorsports	Chevrolet
43	Ryan Ellis	Alpha Prime Racing	Chevrolet
44	Brennan Poole	Alpha Prime Racing	Chevrolet
45	Caesar Bacarella	Alpha Prime Racing	Chevrolet
48	Parker Kligerman	Big Machine Racing	Chevrolet
51	Jeremy Clements	Jeremy Clements Racing	Chevrolet
66	David Starr	MBM Motorsports	Chevrolet
81	Chandler Smith	Joe Gibbs Racing	Toyota
91	Kyle Weatherman	DGM Racing	Chevrolet
92	Josh Bilicki	DGM Racing	Chevrolet
97	Shane van Gisbergen (R)	Kaulig Racing	Chevrolet
98	Riley Herbst	Stewart–Haas Racing	Ford
Official entry list

== Qualifying ==
Qualifying was held on Friday, April 19, at 4:30 PM CST. Since Talladega Superspeedway is a superspeedway, the qualifying system used is a single-car, single-lap system with two rounds. In the first round, drivers will be on track by themselves and will have one lap to set a time. The fastest ten drivers from the first round move on to the second and final round. Whoever sets the fastest time in Round 2 will win the pole.

Austin Hill, driving for Richard Childress Racing, would advance from the preliminary round and set the fastest time in Round 2, with a lap of 52.723, and a speed of 181.629 mph (292.304 km/h).

Garrett Smithley was the only driver who failed to qualify. Smithley had original made the race, but his time would be disallowed after a roof hatch came loose during his qualifying attempt. Mason Massey, who originally failed to qualify, would take his place on the grid.

=== Qualifying results ===
Pos.	#	Driver	Team	Make	Time (R1)	Speed (R1)	Time (R2)	Speed (R2)
1	21	Austin Hill	Richard Childress Racing	Chevrolet	52.793	181.388	52.723	181.629
2	2	Jesse Love (R)	Richard Childress Racing	Chevrolet	52.906	181.000	52.871	181.120
3	48	Parker Kligerman	Big Machine Racing	Chevrolet	52.880	181.089	52.996	180.693
4	00	Cole Custer	Stewart–Haas Racing	Ford	53.196	180.014	53.150	180.169
5	8	Sammy Smith	JR Motorsports	Chevrolet	53.237	179.875	53.184	180.054
6	20	Ryan Truex	Joe Gibbs Racing	Toyota	53.237	179.875	53.217	179.942
7	81	Chandler Smith	Joe Gibbs Racing	Toyota	53.256	179.811	53.241	179.861
8	98	Riley Herbst	Stewart–Haas Racing	Ford	53.214	179.953	53.267	179.774
9	11	Josh Williams	Kaulig Racing	Chevrolet	53.186	180.047	53.328	179.568
10	18	Sheldon Creed	Joe Gibbs Racing	Toyota	53.176	180.081	53.567	178.767
Eliminated in Round 1
11	5	Anthony Alfredo	Our Motorsports	Chevrolet	53.259	179.801	—	—
12	07	Patrick Emerling	SS-Green Light Racing	Chevrolet	53.318	179.602	—	—
13	19	Taylor Gray (i)	Joe Gibbs Racing	Toyota	53.330	179.561	—	—
14	16	A. J. Allmendinger	Kaulig Racing	Chevrolet	53.338	179.534	—	—
15	1	Sam Mayer	JR Motorsports	Chevrolet	53.346	179.507	—	—
16	7	Justin Allgaier	JR Motorsports	Chevrolet	53.350	179.494	—	—
17	35	Joey Gase	Joey Gase Motorsports	Chevrolet	53.361	179.457	—	—
18	97	Shane van Gisbergen (R)	Kaulig Racing	Chevrolet	53.387	179.370	—	—
19	66	David Starr	MBM Motorsports	Chevrolet	53.429	179.229	—	—
20	91	Kyle Weatherman	DGM Racing	Chevrolet	53.436	179.205	—	—
21	31	Parker Retzlaff	Jordan Anderson Racing	Chevrolet	53.450	179.158	—	—
22	51	Jeremy Clements	Jeremy Clements Racing	Chevrolet	53.460	179.125	—	—
23	9	Brandon Jones	JR Motorsports	Chevrolet	53.468	179.098	—	—
24	39	Ryan Sieg	RSS Racing	Ford	53.473	179.081	—	—
25	28	Kyle Sieg	RSS Racing	Ford	53.490	179.024	—	—
26	29	Blaine Perkins	RSS Racing	Ford	53.554	178.810	—	—
27	44	Brennan Poole	Alpha Prime Racing	Chevrolet	53.670	178.424	—	—
28	38	Matt DiBenedetto	RSS Racing	Ford	53.701	178.321	—	—
29	45	Caesar Bacarella	Alpha Prime Racing	Chevrolet	53.747	178.168	—	—
30	4	Dawson Cram (R)	JD Motorsports	Chevrolet	53.757	178.135	—	—
31	15	Hailie Deegan (R)	AM Racing	Ford	53.760	178.125	—	—
32	32	Jordan Anderson	Jordan Anderson Racing	Chevrolet	53.771	178.089	—	—
33	42	Leland Honeyman (R)	Young's Motorsports	Chevrolet	53.932	177.557	—	—
Qualified by owner's points
34	26	Jeffrey Earnhardt	Sam Hunt Racing	Toyota	53.942	177.524	—	—
35	27	Jeb Burton	Jordan Anderson Racing	Chevrolet	53.970	177.432	—	—
36	92	Josh Bilicki	DGM Racing	Chevrolet	53.984	177.386	—	—
37	43	Ryan Ellis	Alpha Prime Racing	Chevrolet	54.192	176.705	—	—
38	14	Mason Massey (i)	SS-Green Light Racing	Chevrolet	54.433	175.923	—	—
Failed to qualify
39	6	Garrett Smithley	JD Motorsports	Chevrolet	53.388	179.366	—	—
Official qualifying results
Official starting lineup

== Race results ==
Stage 1 Laps: 25

Pos.	#	Driver	Team	Make	Pts
1	2	Jesse Love (R)	Richard Childress Racing	Chevrolet	10
2	48	Parker Kligerman	Big Machine Racing	Chevrolet	9
3	21	Austin Hill	Richard Childress Racing	Chevrolet	8
4	81	Chandler Smith	Joe Gibbs Racing	Toyota	7
5	16	A. J. Allmendinger	Kaulig Racing	Chevrolet	6
6	20	Ryan Truex	Joe Gibbs Racing	Toyota	5
7	97	Shane van Gisbergen (R)	Kaulig Racing	Chevrolet	4
8	9	Brandon Jones	JR Motorsports	Chevrolet	3
9	98	Riley Herbst	Stewart–Haas Racing	Ford	2
10	00	Cole Custer	Stewart–Haas Racing	Ford	1

Stage 2 Laps: 25

Pos.	#	Driver	Team	Make	Pts
1	21	Austin Hill	Richard Childress Racing	Chevrolet	10
2	2	Jesse Love (R)	Richard Childress Racing	Chevrolet	9
3	16	A. J. Allmendinger	Kaulig Racing	Chevrolet	8
4	39	Ryan Sieg	RSS Racing	Ford	8
5	9	Brandon Jones	JR Motorsports	Chevrolet	6
6	81	Chandler Smith	Joe Gibbs Racing	Toyota	5
7	48	Parker Kligerman	Big Machine Racing	Chevrolet	4
8	98	Riley Herbst	Stewart–Haas Racing	Ford	3
9	27	Jeb Burton	Jordan Anderson Racing	Chevrolet	2
10	00	Cole Custer	Stewart–Haas Racing	Ford	1

Stage 3 Laps: 74

Fin	St	#	Driver	Team	Make	Laps	Led	Status	Pts
1	2	2	Jesse Love (R)	Richard Childress Racing	Chevrolet	124	28	Running	59
2	8	98	Riley Herbst	Stewart–Haas Racing	Ford	124	13	Running	40
3	11	5	Anthony Alfredo	Our Motorsports	Chevrolet	124	6	Running	34
4	33	42	Leland Honeyman (R)	Young's Motorsports	Chevrolet	124	0	Running	33
5	27	44	Brennan Poole	Alpha Prime Racing	Chevrolet	124	0	Running	32
6	10	18	Sheldon Creed	Joe Gibbs Racing	Toyota	124	0	Running	31
7	29	45	Caesar Bacarella	Alpha Prime Racing	Chevrolet	124	0	Running	30
8	28	38	Matt DiBenedetto	RSS Racing	Ford	124	1	Running	29
9	35	27	Jeb Burton	Jordan Anderson Racing	Chevrolet	124	0	Running	30
10	4	00	Cole Custer	Stewart–Haas Racing	Ford	124	4	Running	29
11	38	14	Mason Massey (i)	SS-Green Light Racing	Chevrolet	124	0	Running	0
12	31	15	Hailie Deegan (R)	AM Racing	Ford	124	0	Running	25
13	25	28	Kyle Sieg	RSS Racing	Ford	124	0	Running	24
14	1	21	Austin Hill	Richard Childress Racing	Chevrolet	124	41	Running	41
15	13	19	Taylor Gray (i)	Joe Gibbs Racing	Toyota	124	1	Running	0
16	36	92	Josh Bilicki	DGM Racing	Chevrolet	124	0	Running	21
17	24	39	Ryan Sieg	RSS Racing	Ford	124	7	Running	27
18	17	35	Joey Gase	Joey Gase Motorsports	Chevrolet	124	0	Running	19
19	14	16	A. J. Allmendinger	Kaulig Racing	Chevrolet	124	0	Running	32
20	9	11	Josh Williams	DGM Racing	Chevrolet	124	0	Running	17
21	5	8	Sammy Smith	JR Motorsports	Chevrolet	124	2	Running	16
22	18	97	Shane van Gisbergen (R)	Kaulig Racing	Chevrolet	124	1	Running	19
23	26	29	Blaine Perkins	RSS Racing	Ford	123	0	Running	14
24	19	66	David Starr	MBM Motorsports	Chevrolet	123	1	Running	13
25	7	81	Chandler Smith	Joe Gibbs Racing	Toyota	123	3	Running	24
26	37	43	Ryan Ellis	Alpha Prime Racing	Chevrolet	123	0	Running	11
27	20	91	Kyle Weatherman	DGM Racing	Chevrolet	120	0	DVP	10
28	30	4	Dawson Cram (R)	JD Motorsports	Chevrolet	120	0	Running	9
29	3	48	Parker Kligerman	Big Machine Racing	Chevrolet	117	10	Accident	21
30	21	31	Parker Retzlaff	Jordan Anderson Racing	Chevrolet	113	0	Ignition	7
31	32	32	Jordan Anderson	Jordan Anderson Racing	Chevrolet	111	1	Accident	6
32	12	07	Patrick Emerling	SS-Green Light Racing	Chevrolet	111	0	Accident	5
33	23	9	Brandon Jones	JR Motorsports	Chevrolet	65	4	Accident	13
34	6	20	Ryan Truex	Joe Gibbs Racing	Toyota	65	1	Accident	8
35	22	51	Jeremy Clements	Jeremy Clements Racing	Chevrolet	65	0	Accident	2
36	15	1	Sam Mayer	JR Motorsports	Chevrolet	65	0	Accident	1
37	34	26	Jeffrey Earnhardt	Sam Hunt Racing	Toyota	46	0	Engine	1
38	16	7	Justin Allgaier	JR Motorsports	Chevrolet	24	0	Accident	1
Official race results

== Standings after the race ==
Drivers' Championship standings

	Pos	Driver	Points
	1	Chandler Smith	357
	2	Cole Custer	343 (-14)
	3	Austin Hill	341 (–16)
1	4	Jesse Love	316 (–41)
1	5	Justin Allgaier	278 (–79)
	6	Riley Herbst	272 (–85)
	7	A. J. Allmendinger	261 (–96)
	8	Sammy Smith	241 (–116)
	9	Parker Kligerman	236 (–121)
	10	Sheldon Creed	231 (–126)
	11	Ryan Sieg	224 (–133)
1	12	Anthony Alfredo	219 (–138)
Official driver's standings

Manufacturers' Championship standings

Pos	Manufacturer	Points
1	Chevrolet	335
2	Toyota	325 (–10)
3	Ford	279 (–56)

- Note: Only the first 12 positions are included for the driver standings.

Previous race: 2024 Andy's Frozen Custard 300	NASCAR Xfinity Series; 2024 season	Next race: 2024 BetRivers 200
