= 2024 Andy's Frozen Custard 300 =

8th race of the 2024 NASCAR Xfinity Series

Race details
- Race 8 of 33 of the 2024 NASCAR Xfinity Series
- Date: April 13, 2024
- Official name: 20th Annual Andy's Frozen Custard 300
- Location: Texas Motor Speedway in Fort Worth, Texas
- Course: Permanent racing facility
- Course length: 1.5 miles (2.4 km)
- Distance: 200 laps, 300 mi (480 km)
- Scheduled distance: 200 laps, 300 mi (480 km)
- Average speed: 125.977 mph (202.740 km/h)

Pole position
Driver	Jesse Love	Richard Childress Racing
- Time: 29.093

Most laps led
Driver	Justin Allgaier	JR Motorsports
- Laps: 117

Winner
No. 1	Sam Mayer	JR Motorsports

Television in the United States
- Network: FS1
- Announcers: Adam Alexander, Joey Logano, and Ross Chastain

Radio in the United States
- Radio: PRN

The 2024 Andy's Frozen Custard 300 was the 8th stock car race of the 2024 NASCAR Xfinity Series, and the 20th iteration of the event. The race was held on Saturday, April 13, 2024, at Texas Motor Speedway in Fort Worth, Texas, a 1.5 miles (2.4 km) permanent asphalt quad-oval shaped intermediate speedway. The race took the scheduled 200 laps to complete. Ryan Sieg, would fail to hold off JR Motorsports driver Sam Mayer, who claimed his first career win at Texas Motor Speedway. Sieg would lead the final 17 laps up until the very last lap, where Mayer was able to pass him in the final corner, resulting in a photo finish. The total margin of victory would be 0.002 seconds, tying for the 2nd closest finish in Xfinity Series history. Justin Allgaier was most consistent driver of the race, winning both stages and leading a race-high 117 laps, but ultimately fell back and rounded out the podium by finishing 3rd.

This was also the second race of the Dash 4 Cash. Drivers who were eligible for the Dash 4 Cash are Sam Mayer, Chandler Smith, Justin Allgaier, and Sheldon Creed, since they were the highest finishing Xfinity Series regulars following the race at Martinsville.

== Report ==
=== Background ===
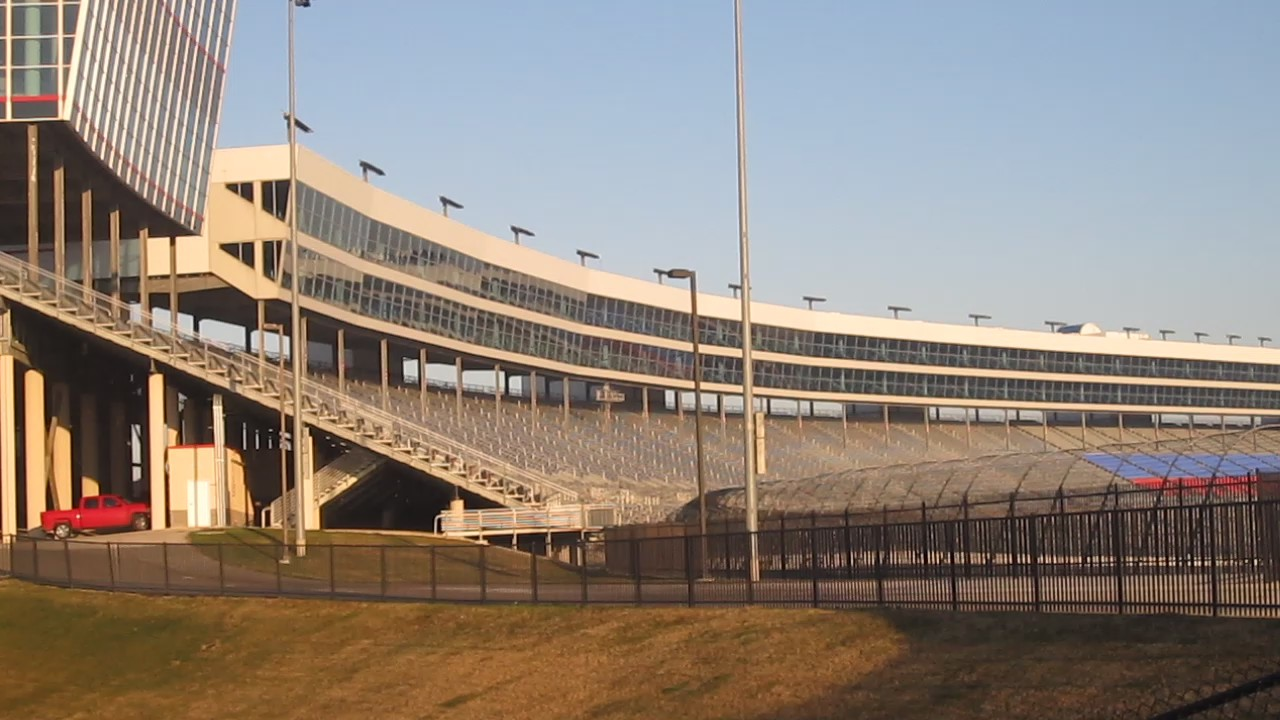
Texas Motor Speedway, the circuit where the race was held.

Texas Motor Speedway is a speedway located in the northernmost portion of the U.S. city of Fort Worth, Texas – the portion located in Denton County, Texas. The track measures 1.5 miles (2.4 km) around and is banked 24 degrees in the turns, and is of the oval design, where the front straightaway juts outward slightly. The track layout is similar to Atlanta Motor Speedway and Charlotte Motor Speedway (formerly Lowe's Motor Speedway). The track is owned by Speedway Motorsports, Inc., the same company that owns Atlanta and Charlotte Motor Speedway, as well as the short-track Bristol Motor Speedway.

==== Entry list ====
- (R) denotes rookie driver.
- (i) denotes driver who is ineligible for series driver points.

#	Driver	Team	Make
00	Cole Custer	Stewart–Haas Racing	Ford
1	Sam Mayer	JR Motorsports	Chevrolet
2	Jesse Love (R)	Richard Childress Racing	Chevrolet
4	Dawson Cram (R)	JD Motorsports	Chevrolet
5	Anthony Alfredo	Our Motorsports	Chevrolet
6	Garrett Smithley	JD Motorsports	Chevrolet
07	Patrick Emerling	SS-Green Light Racing	Chevrolet
7	Justin Allgaier	JR Motorsports	Chevrolet
8	Sammy Smith	JR Motorsports	Chevrolet
9	Brandon Jones	JR Motorsports	Chevrolet
10	Daniel Dye (i)	Kaulig Racing	Chevrolet
11	Josh Williams	Kaulig Racing	Chevrolet
14	David Starr	SS-Green Light Racing	Chevrolet
15	Hailie Deegan (R)	AM Racing	Ford
16	A. J. Allmendinger	Kaulig Racing	Chevrolet
18	Sheldon Creed	Joe Gibbs Racing	Toyota
19	Taylor Gray (i)	Joe Gibbs Racing	Toyota
20	Ryan Truex	Joe Gibbs Racing	Toyota
21	Austin Hill	Richard Childress Racing	Chevrolet
26	Corey Heim (i)	Sam Hunt Racing	Toyota
27	Jeb Burton	Jordan Anderson Racing	Chevrolet
28	Kyle Sieg	RSS Racing	Ford
29	Blaine Perkins	RSS Racing	Ford
31	Parker Retzlaff	Jordan Anderson Racing	Chevrolet
35	Joey Gase	Joey Gase Motorsports	Chevrolet
38	Matt DiBenedetto	RSS Racing	Ford
39	Ryan Sieg	RSS Racing	Ford
42	Leland Honeyman (R)	Young's Motorsports	Chevrolet
43	Ryan Ellis	Alpha Prime Racing	Chevrolet
44	Brennan Poole	Alpha Prime Racing	Chevrolet
48	Parker Kligerman	Big Machine Racing	Chevrolet
51	Jeremy Clements	Jeremy Clements Racing	Chevrolet
66	Chad Finchum	MBM Motorsports	Ford
81	Chandler Smith	Joe Gibbs Racing	Toyota
91	Kyle Weatherman	DGM Racing	Chevrolet
92	Josh Bilicki	DGM Racing	Chevrolet
97	Shane van Gisbergen (R)	Kaulig Racing	Chevrolet
98	Riley Herbst	Stewart–Haas Racing	Ford
Official entry list

== Practice ==
The first and only practice session was held on Friday, April 12, at 5:00 PM CST, and would last for 20 minutes. Justin Allgaier, driving for JR Motorsports, would set the fastest time in the session, with a lap of 29.902, and a speed of 180.590 mph (290.631 km/h).

Pos.	#	Driver	Team	Make	Time	Speed
1	7	Justin Allgaier	JR Motorsports	Chevrolet	29.902	180.590
2	16	A. J. Allmendinger	Kaulig Racing	Chevrolet	29.932	180.409
3	39	Ryan Sieg	RSS Racing	Ford	30.089	179.468
Full practice results

== Qualifying ==
Qualifying was held on Friday, April 12, at 5:30 PM CST. Since Texas Motor Speedway is an intermediate speedway, the qualifying system used is a single-car, one-lap system with only one round. Drivers will be on track by themselves and will have one lap to post a qualifying time. Whoever sets the fastest time in that round will win the pole.

Jesse Love, driving for Richard Childress Racing, would score the pole for the race, with a lap of 29.093, and a speed of 185.612 mph (298.714 km/h).

No drivers would fail to qualify.

=== Qualifying results ===
Pos.	#	Driver	Team	Make	Time	Speed
1	2	Jesse Love (R)	Richard Childress Racing	Chevrolet	29.093	185.612
2	00	Cole Custer	Stewart–Haas Racing	Ford	29.115	185.471
3	19	Taylor Gray (i)	Joe Gibbs Racing	Toyota	29.123	185.420
4	81	Chandler Smith	Joe Gibbs Racing	Toyota	29.140	185.312
5	98	Riley Herbst	Stewart–Haas Racing	Ford	29.142	185.300
6	7	Justin Allgaier	JR Motorsports	Chevrolet	29.154	185.223
7	20	Ryan Truex	Joe Gibbs Racing	Toyota	29.322	184.162
8	16	A. J. Allmendinger	Kaulig Racing	Chevrolet	29.338	184.062
9	8	Sammy Smith	JR Motorsports	Chevrolet	29.366	183.886
10	1	Sam Mayer	JR Motorsports	Chevrolet	29.372	183.849
11	9	Brandon Jones	JR Motorsports	Chevrolet	29.378	183.811
12	5	Anthony Alfredo	Our Motorsports	Chevrolet	29.449	183.368
13	21	Austin Hill	Richard Childress Racing	Chevrolet	29.460	183.299
14	39	Ryan Sieg	RSS Racing	Ford	29.518	182.939
15	18	Sheldon Creed	Joe Gibbs Racing	Toyota	29.553	182.723
16	48	Parker Kligerman	Big Machine Racing	Chevrolet	29.590	182.494
17	26	Corey Heim (i)	Sam Hunt Racing	Toyota	29.615	182.340
18	51	Jeremy Clements	Jeremy Clements Racing	Chevrolet	29.691	181.873
19	91	Kyle Weatherman	DGM Racing	Chevrolet	29.696	181.843
20	15	Hailie Deegan (R)	AM Racing	Ford	29.772	181.378
21	27	Jeb Burton	Jordan Anderson Racing	Chevrolet	29.797	181.226
22	11	Josh Williams	Kaulig Racing	Chevrolet	29.807	181.165
23	28	Kyle Sieg	RSS Racing	Ford	29.901	180.596
24	10	Daniel Dye (i)	Kaulig Racing	Chevrolet	29.916	180.505
25	44	Brennan Poole	Alpha Prime Racing	Chevrolet	30.044	179.736
26	29	Blaine Perkins	RSS Racing	Ford	30.071	179.575
27	38	Matt DiBenedetto	RSS Racing	Ford	30.085	179.491
28	92	Josh Bilicki	DGM Racing	Chevrolet	30.184	178.903
29	31	Parker Retzlaff	Jordan Anderson Racing	Chevrolet	30.194	178.843
30	07	Patrick Emerling	SS-Green Light Racing	Chevrolet	30.295	178.247
31	42	Leland Honeyman (R)	Young's Motorsports	Chevrolet	30.317	178.118
32	6	Garrett Smithley	JD Motorsports	Chevrolet	30.399	177.637
33	97	Shane van Gisbergen (R)	Kaulig Racing	Chevrolet	30.419	177.521
Qualified by owner's points
34	4	Dawson Cram (R)	JD Motorsports	Chevrolet	30.431	177.451
35	66	Chad Finchum	MBM Motorsports	Ford	30.466	177.247
36	43	Ryan Ellis	Alpha Prime Racing	Chevrolet	30.506	177.014
37	35	Joey Gase	Joey Gase Motorsports	Chevrolet	30.637	176.257
38	14	David Starr	SS-Green Light Racing	Chevrolet	30.899	174.763
Official qualifying results
Official starting lineup

== Race results ==
=== Final laps ===
The race restarted on lap 190 after an incident involving Sheldon Creed, Kyle Weatherman, and Hailie Deegan. Riley Herbst blew a tire after contact with Brandon Jones on lap 191, but did not produce a caution. Ryan Sieg took over the lead on the restart, and continued to pull away by about one second. Sieg's car began getting tight, allowing Sam Mayer to close the gap. On the final lap, Mayer attempted to make a move to the inside of Sieg for the lead. Coming into turn 3, Mayer drifted up the racetrack and allowed Sieg to his inside. Mayer would manage to get Sieg at the line by 0.002 seconds, tying for the second-closest finish in series history and getting JR Motorsports their first win of the year. Justin Allgaier, after leading 117 laps, finished in third, with A. J. Allmendinger and Cole Custer rounding out the top five. Austin Hill, Ryan Truex, Sammy Smith, Jesse Love, and Anthony Alfredo would complete the rest of the top ten.

Stage 1 Laps: 65

Pos.	#	Driver	Team	Make	Pts
1	7	Justin Allgaier	JR Motorsports	Chevrolet	10
2	81	Chandler Smith	Joe Gibbs Racing	Toyota	9
3	98	Riley Herbst	Stewart-Haas Racing	Ford	8
4	9	Brandon Jones	JR Motorsports	Chevrolet	7
5	00	Cole Custer	Stewart-Haas Racing	Ford	6
6	20	Ryan Truex	Joe Gibbs Racing	Toyota	5
7	21	Austin Hill	Richard Childress Racing	Chevrolet	4
8	39	Ryan Sieg	RSS Racing	Ford	3
9	16	A. J. Allmendinger	Kaulig Racing	Chevrolet	2
10	48	Parker Kligerman	Big Machine Racing	Chevrolet	1

Stage 2 Laps: 65

Pos.	#	Driver	Team	Make	Pts
1	7	Justin Allgaier	JR Motorsports	Chevrolet	10
2	00	Cole Custer	Stewart-Haas Racing	Ford	9
3	98	Riley Herbst	Stewart-Haas Racing	Ford	8
4	9	Brandon Jones	JR Motorsports	Chevrolet	7
5	39	Ryan Sieg	RSS Racing	Ford	6
6	8	Sammy Smith	JR Motorsports	Chevrolet	5
7	21	Austin Hill	Richard Childress Racing	Chevrolet	4
8	2	Jesse Love (R)	Richard Childress Racing	Chevrolet	3
9	16	A. J. Allmendinger	Kaulig Racing	Chevrolet	2
10	1	Sam Mayer	JR Motorsports	Chevrolet	1

Stage 3 Laps: 70

Fin	St	#	Driver	Team	Make	Laps	Led	Status	Pts
1	10	1	Sam Mayer	JR Motorsports	Chevrolet	200	5	Running	41
2	14	39	Ryan Sieg	RSS Racing	Ford	200	17	Running	44
3	6	7	Justin Allgaier	JR Motorsports	Chevrolet	200	117	Running	54
4	8	16	A. J. Allmendinger	Kaulig Racing	Chevrolet	200	0	Running	37
5	2	00	Cole Custer	Stewart–Haas Racing	Ford	200	1	Running	47
6	13	21	Austin Hill	Richard Childress Racing	Chevrolet	200	25	Running	39
7	7	20	Ryan Truex	Joe Gibbs Racing	Toyota	200	0	Running	35
8	9	8	Sammy Smith	JR Motorsports	Chevrolet	200	0	Running	34
9	1	2	Jesse Love (R)	Richard Childress Racing	Chevrolet	200	1	Running	31
10	12	5	Anthony Alfredo	Our Motorsports	Chevrolet	200	0	Running	27
11	3	19	Taylor Gray (i)	Joe Gibbs Racing	Toyota	200	0	Running	0
12	22	11	Josh Williams	Kaulig Racing	Chevrolet	200	0	Running	25
13	11	9	Brandon Jones	JR Motorsports	Chevrolet	200	2	Running	38
14	23	28	Kyle Sieg	RSS Racing	Ford	200	0	Running	23
15	4	81	Chandler Smith	Joe Gibbs Racing	Toyota	200	26	Running	31
16	18	51	Jeremy Clements	Jeremy Clements Racing	Chevrolet	200	0	Running	21
17	17	26	Corey Heim (i)	Sam Hunt Racing	Toyota	200	0	Running	0
18	33	97	Shane van Gisbergen (R)	Kaulig Racing	Chevrolet	200	0	Running	19
19	15	18	Sheldon Creed	Joe Gibbs Racing	Toyota	200	2	Running	18
20	27	38	Matt DiBenedetto	RSS Racing	Ford	200	0	Running	17
21	25	44	Brennan Poole	Alpha Prime Racing	Chevrolet	200	0	Running	16
22	29	31	Parker Retzlaff	Jordan Anderson Racing	Chevrolet	200	0	Running	15
23	20	15	Hailie Deegan (R)	AM Racing	Ford	200	0	Running	14
24	24	10	Daniel Dye (i)	Kaulig Racing	Chevrolet	200	0	Running	0
25	16	48	Parker Kligerman	Big Machine Racing	Chevrolet	200	4	Running	13
26	36	43	Ryan Ellis	Alpha Prime Racing	Chevrolet	199	0	Running	11
27	5	98	Riley Herbst	Stewart–Haas Racing	Ford	199	0	Running	26
28	38	14	David Starr	SS-Green Light Racing	Chevrolet	198	0	Running	9
29	28	92	Josh Bilicki	DGM Racing	Chevrolet	198	0	Running	8
30	37	35	Joey Gase	Joey Gase Motorsports	Chevrolet	198	0	Running	7
31	31	42	Leland Honeyman (R)	Young's Motorsports	Chevrolet	198	0	Running	6
32	21	27	Jeb Burton	Jordan Anderson Racing	Chevrolet	197	0	Running	5
33	30	07	Patrick Emerling	SS-Green Light Racing	Chevrolet	197	0	Running	4
34	32	6	Garrett Smithley	JD Motorsports	Chevrolet	197	0	Running	3
35	26	29	Blaine Perkins	RSS Racing	Ford	197	0	Running	2
36	19	91	Kyle Weatherman	DGM Racing	Chevrolet	191	0	Accident	1
37	34	4	Dawson Cram (R)	JD Motorsports	Chevrolet	191	0	Running	1
38	35	66	Chad Finchum	MBM Motorsports	Ford	127	0	Suspension	1
Official race results

== Standings after the race ==
Drivers' Championship standings

	Pos	Driver	Points
	1	Chandler Smith	333
	2	Cole Custer	314 (-19)
	3	Austin Hill	300 (–33)
1	4	Justin Allgaier	277 (–56)
1	5	Jesse Love	257 (–76)
	6	Riley Herbst	232 (–101)
1	7	A. J. Allmendinger	229 (–104)
1	8	Sammy Smith	225 (–108)
2	9	Parker Kligerman	215 (–118)
	10	Sheldon Creed	200 (–133)
4	11	Ryan Sieg	197 (–136)
2	12	Brandon Jones	192 (–141)
Official driver's standings

Manufacturers' Championship standings

Pos	Manufacturer	Points
1	Chevrolet	295
2	Toyota	284 (–11)
3	Ford	245 (–50)

- Note: Only the first 12 positions are included for the driver standings.

Previous race: 2024 Dude Wipes 250	NASCAR Xfinity Series; 2024 season	Next race: 2024 Ag-Pro 300
