= 2024 Hy-Vee PERKS 250 =

15th race of the 2024 NASCAR Xfinity Series

Race details
- Race 15 of 33 of the 2024 NASCAR Xfinity Series
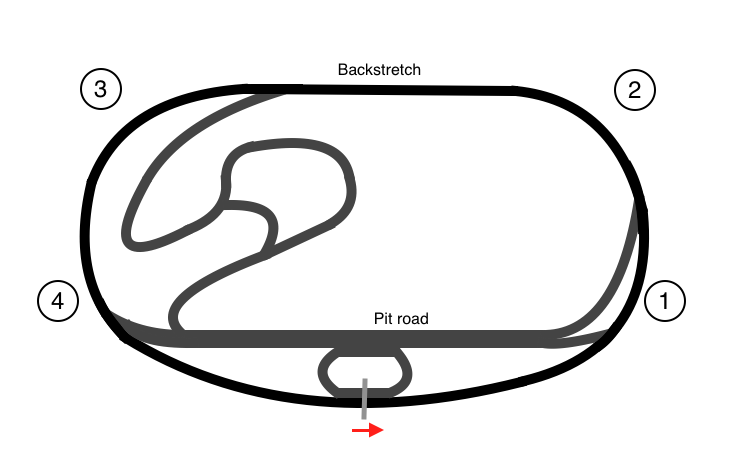
- Date: June 15, 2024
- Official name: 10th Annual Hy-Vee PERKS 250
- Location: Iowa Speedway in Newton, Iowa
- Course: Permanent racing facility
- Course length: 0.875 miles (1.408 km)
- Distance: 253 laps, 221 mi (355 km)
- Scheduled distance: 250 laps, 218 mi (352 km)
- Average speed: 84.899 mph (136.632 km/h)

Pole position
Driver	Austin Hill	Richard Childress Racing
- Grid positions set by competition-based formula

Most laps led
Driver	Chandler Smith	Joe Gibbs Racing
- Laps: 131

Winner
No. 1	Sam Mayer	JR Motorsports

Television in the United States
- Network: USA
- Announcers: Rick Allen, Dale Jarrett, and Jeff Burton

Radio in the United States
- Radio: MRN

The 2024 Hy-Vee PERKS 250 was the 15th stock car race of the 2024 NASCAR Xfinity Series, and the 10th iteration of the event. The race was held on Saturday, June 15, 2024, at Iowa Speedway in Newton, Iowa, a 0.875 miles (1.408 km) permanent asphalt tri-oval shaped racetrack. The race was originally scheduled to be contested over 250 laps, but was extended to 253 laps due to a NASCAR overtime finish. In an action-packed race, Sam Mayer, driving for JR Motorsports, would take the lead from Riley Herbst in the late stages, and held off the field on an overtime restart to earn his sixth career NASCAR Xfinity Series win, and his second of the season. Chandler Smith had dominated the majority of the race, leading a race-high 131 laps before fading back in the final stage to finish 8th. To fill out the podium, Herbst, driving for Stewart–Haas Racing, and Corey Heim, driving for Sam Hunt Racing, would finish 2nd and 3rd, respectively.

This was the first race for the series at Iowa since 2019, after the 2020 race was canceled due to the pandemic and the race was removed from the 2021 schedule.

== Report ==
=== Background ===
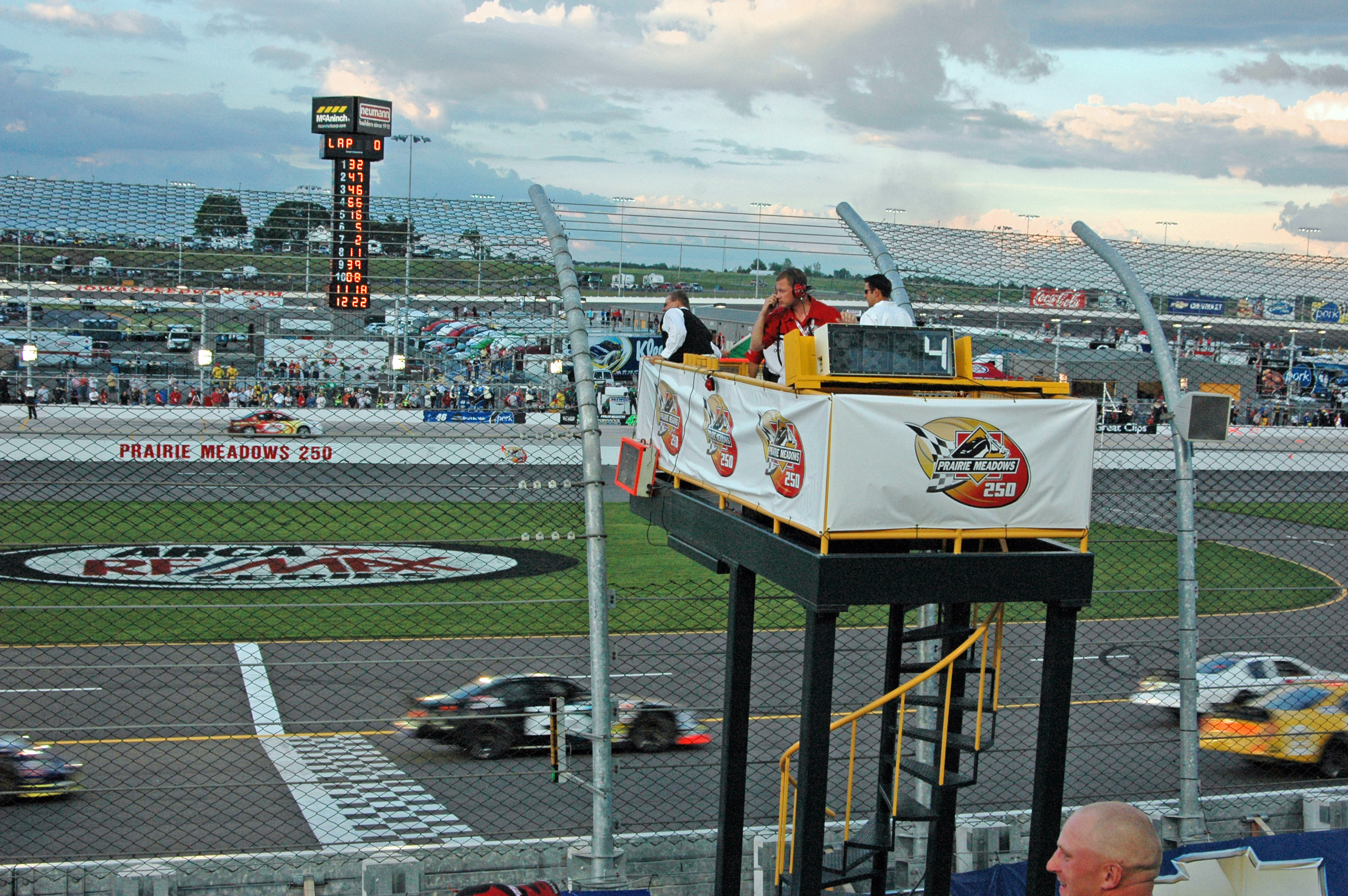
Flagstand of Iowa Speedway in June 2007, the track where the race was held.

Iowa Speedway is a 7/8-mile (1.4 km) paved oval motor racing track in Newton, Iowa, United States, approximately 30 miles (48 km) east of Des Moines. The track was designed with influence from Rusty Wallace and patterned after Richmond Raceway, a short track where Wallace was very successful. It has over 25,000 permanent seats as well as a unique multi-tiered Recreational Vehicle viewing area along the backstretch.

==== Entry list ====
- (R) denotes rookie driver.

#	Driver	Team	Make
00	Cole Custer	Stewart–Haas Racing	Ford
1	Sam Mayer	JR Motorsports	Chevrolet
2	Jesse Love (R)	Richard Childress Racing	Chevrolet
4	Dawson Cram (R)	JD Motorsports	Chevrolet
5	Anthony Alfredo	Our Motorsports	Chevrolet
6	Garrett Smithley	JD Motorsports	Chevrolet
07	Patrick Emerling	SS-Green Light Racing	Chevrolet
7	Justin Allgaier	JR Motorsports	Chevrolet
8	Sammy Smith	JR Motorsports	Chevrolet
9	Brandon Jones	JR Motorsports	Chevrolet
10	Daniel Dye (i)	Kaulig Racing	Chevrolet
11	Josh Williams	Kaulig Racing	Chevrolet
14	David Starr	SS-Green Light Racing	Chevrolet
15	Hailie Deegan (R)	AM Racing	Ford
16	A. J. Allmendinger	Kaulig Racing	Chevrolet
18	Sheldon Creed	Joe Gibbs Racing	Toyota
19	Brett Moffitt (i)	Joe Gibbs Racing	Toyota
20	John Hunter Nemechek (i)	Joe Gibbs Racing	Toyota
21	Austin Hill	Richard Childress Racing	Chevrolet
26	Corey Heim (i)	Sam Hunt Racing	Toyota
27	Jeb Burton	Jordan Anderson Racing	Chevrolet
28	Kyle Sieg	RSS Racing	Ford
29	Blaine Perkins	RSS Racing	Ford
31	Parker Retzlaff	Jordan Anderson Racing	Chevrolet
35	Joey Gase	Joey Gase Motorsports	Chevrolet
38	Matt DiBenedetto	RSS Racing	Ford
39	Ryan Sieg	RSS Racing	Ford
42	Leland Honeyman (R)	Young's Motorsports	Chevrolet
43	Ryan Ellis	Alpha Prime Racing	Chevrolet
44	Brennan Poole	Alpha Prime Racing	Chevrolet
48	Parker Kligerman	Big Machine Racing	Chevrolet
51	Jeremy Clements	Jeremy Clements Racing	Chevrolet
53	Glen Reen	Joey Gase Motorsports	Chevrolet
81	Chandler Smith	Joe Gibbs Racing	Toyota
91	Kyle Weatherman	DGM Racing	Chevrolet
92	Ross Chastain (i)	DGM Racing	Chevrolet
97	Shane van Gisbergen (R)	Kaulig Racing	Chevrolet
98	Riley Herbst	Stewart–Haas Racing	Ford
Official entry list

== Practice ==
The first and only practice session was held on Friday, June 14, at 3:35 PM CST, and would last for 50 minutes. Corey Heim, driving for Sam Hunt Racing, would set the fastest time in the session, with a lap of 22.648, and a speed of 139.085 mph (223.836 km/h).

Pos.	#	Driver	Team	Make	Time	Speed
1	26	Corey Heim (i)	Sam Hunt Racing	Toyota	22.648	139.085
2	2	Jesse Love (R)	Richard Childress Racing	Chevrolet	22.737	138.541
3	27	Jeb Burton	Jordan Anderson Racing	Chevrolet	22.990	137.016
Full practice results

== Qualifying ==
Qualifying was originally scheduled to be held on Saturday, June 15, at 11:05 AM CST. The qualifying system used is a multi-car, multi-lap based system. All drivers will be on track for a 55-minute timed session, and whoever sets the fastest time in that session will win the pole.

Qualifying was cancelled due to inclement weather. The starting lineup would be determined per the NASCAR rulebook. As a result, Austin Hill, driving for Richard Childress Racing, would start on the pole.

=== Starting lineup ===
Pos.	#	Driver	Team	Make
1	21	Austin Hill	Richard Childress Racing	Chevrolet
2	97	Shane van Gisbergen (R)	Kaulig Racing	Chevrolet
3	18	Sheldon Creed	Joe Gibbs Racing	Toyota
4	7	Justin Allgaier	JR Motorsports	Chevrolet
5	1	Sam Mayer	JR Motorsports	Chevrolet
6	81	Chandler Smith	Joe Gibbs Racing	Toyota
7	00	Cole Custer	Stewart–Haas Racing	Ford
8	20	John Hunter Nemechek (i)	Joe Gibbs Racing	Toyota
9	2	Jesse Love (R)	Richard Childress Racing	Chevrolet
10	48	Parker Kligerman	Big Machine Racing	Chevrolet
11	16	A. J. Allmendinger	Kaulig Racing	Chevrolet
12	98	Riley Herbst	Stewart–Haas Racing	Ford
13	31	Parker Retzlaff	Jordan Anderson Racing	Chevrolet
14	44	Brennan Poole	Alpha Prime Racing	Chevrolet
15	39	Ryan Sieg	RSS Racing	Ford
16	51	Jeremy Clements	Jeremy Clements Racing	Chevrolet
17	8	Sammy Smith	JR Motorsports	Chevrolet
18	29	Blaine Perkins	RSS Racing	Ford
19	5	Anthony Alfredo	Our Motorsports	Chevrolet
20	43	Ryan Ellis	Alpha Prime Racing	Chevrolet
21	28	Kyle Sieg	RSS Racing	Ford
22	26	Corey Heim (i)	Sam Hunt Racing	Toyota
23	91	Kyle Weatherman	DGM Racing	Chevrolet
24	38	Matt DiBenedetto	RSS Racing	Ford
25	42	Leland Honeyman (R)	Young's Motorsports	Chevrolet
26	9	Brandon Jones	JR Motorsports	Chevrolet
27	11	Josh Williams	Kaulig Racing	Chevrolet
28	92	Ross Chastain (i)	DGM Racing	Chevrolet
29	19	Brett Moffitt (i)	Joe Gibbs Racing	Toyota
30	27	Jeb Burton	Jordan Anderson Racing	Chevrolet
31	14	David Starr	SS-Green Light Racing	Chevrolet
32	07	Patrick Emerling	SS-Green Light Racing	Chevrolet
33	15	Hailie Deegan (R)	AM Racing	Ford
Qualified by owner's points
34	4	Dawson Cram (R)	JD Motorsports	Chevrolet
35	6	Garrett Smithley	JD Motorsports	Chevrolet
36	35	Joey Gase	Joey Gase Motorsports	Chevrolet
37	10	Daniel Dye (i)	Kaulig Racing	Chevrolet
38	53	Glen Reen	Joey Gase Motorsports	Chevrolet
Official qualifying results
Official starting lineup

== Race results ==
Stage 1 Laps: 60

Pos.	#	Driver	Team	Make	Pts
1	81	Chandler Smith	Joe Gibbs Racing	Toyota	10
2	18	Sheldon Creed	Joe Gibbs Racing	Toyota	9
3	1	Sam Mayer	JR Motorsports	Chevrolet	8
4	7	Justin Allgaier	JR Motorsports	Chevrolet	7
5	8	Sammy Smith	JR Motorsports	Chevrolet	6
6	00	Cole Custer	Stewart–Haas Racing	Ford	5
7	19	Brett Moffitt (i)	Joe Gibbs Racing	Toyota	0
8	26	Corey Heim (i)	Sam Hunt Racing	Toyota	0
9	20	John Hunter Nemechek (i)	Joe Gibbs Racing	Toyota	0
10	2	Jesse Love (R)	Richard Childress Racing	Chevrolet	1

Stage 2 Laps: 60

Pos.	#	Driver	Team	Make	Pts
1	81	Chandler Smith	Joe Gibbs Racing	Toyota	10
2	1	Sam Mayer	JR Motorsports	Chevrolet	9
3	92	Ross Chastain (i)	DGM Racing	Chevrolet	0
4	26	Corey Heim (i)	Sam Hunt Racing	Toyota	0
5	8	Sammy Smith	JR Motorsports	Chevrolet	6
6	18	Sheldon Creed	Joe Gibbs Racing	Toyota	5
7	7	Justin Allgaier	JR Motorsports	Chevrolet	4
8	98	Riley Herbst	Stewart–Haas Racing	Ford	3
9	00	Cole Custer	Stewart–Haas Racing	Ford	2
10	21	Austin Hill	Richard Childress Racing	Chevrolet	1

Stage 3 Laps: 130

Fin	St	#	Driver	Team	Make	Laps	Led	Status	Pts
1	5	1	Sam Mayer	JR Motorsports	Chevrolet	253	47	Running	57
2	12	98	Riley Herbst	Stewart–Haas Racing	Ford	253	7	Running	38
3	22	26	Corey Heim (i)	Sam Hunt Racing	Toyota	253	0	Running	0
4	17	8	Sammy Smith	JR Motorsports	Chevrolet	253	0	Running	45
5	3	18	Sheldon Creed	Joe Gibbs Racing	Toyota	253	0	Running	46
6	7	00	Cole Custer	Stewart–Haas Racing	Ford	253	0	Running	38
7	24	38	Matt DiBenedetto	RSS Racing	Ford	253	0	Running	30
8	6	81	Chandler Smith	Joe Gibbs Racing	Toyota	253	131	Running	49
9	28	92	Ross Chastain (i)	DGM Racing	Chevrolet	253	0	Running	0
10	37	10	Daniel Dye (i)	Kaulig Racing	Chevrolet	253	0	Running	0
11	10	48	Parker Kligerman	Big Machine Racing	Chevrolet	253	0	Running	26
12	15	39	Ryan Sieg	RSS Racing	Ford	253	8	Running	25
13	25	42	Leland Honeyman (R)	Young's Motorsports	Chevrolet	253	0	Running	24
14	20	43	Ryan Ellis	Alpha Prime Racing	Chevrolet	253	0	Running	23
15	19	5	Anthony Alfredo	Our Motorsports	Chevrolet	253	0	Running	22
16	36	35	Joey Gase	Joey Gase Motorsports	Chevrolet	253	0	Running	21
17	31	14	David Starr	SS-Green Light Racing	Chevrolet	253	0	Running	20
18	29	19	Brett Moffitt (i)	Joe Gibbs Racing	Toyota	252	0	Running	0
19	21	28	Kyle Sieg	RSS Racing	Ford	252	0	Running	18
20	27	11	Josh Williams	Kaulig Racing	Chevrolet	252	4	Running	17
21	16	51	Jeremy Clements	Jeremy Clements Racing	Chevrolet	252	7	Running	16
22	34	4	Dawson Cram (R)	JD Motorsports	Chevrolet	252	0	Running	15
23	32	07	Patrick Emerling	SS-Green Light Racing	Chevrolet	252	0	Running	14
24	30	27	Jeb Burton	Jordan Anderson Racing	Chevrolet	250	0	Running	13
25	33	15	Hailie Deegan (R)	AM Racing	Ford	250	0	Running	12
26	35	6	Garrett Smithley	JD Motorsports	Chevrolet	250	0	Running	11
27	8	20	John Hunter Nemechek (i)	Joe Gibbs Racing	Toyota	244	35	Accident	0
28	14	44	Brennan Poole	Alpha Prime Racing	Chevrolet	218	0	Oil Line	9
29	1	21	Austin Hill	Richard Childress Racing	Chevrolet	217	0	Accident	9
30	4	7	Justin Allgaier	JR Motorsports	Chevrolet	200	14	Accident	18
31	9	2	Jesse Love (R)	Richard Childress Racing	Chevrolet	149	0	Accident	7
32	13	31	Parker Retzlaff	Jordan Anderson Racing	Chevrolet	103	0	Electrical	5
33	23	91	Kyle Weatherman	DGM Racing	Chevrolet	87	0	Accident	4
34	2	97	Shane van Gisbergen (R)	Kaulig Racing	Chevrolet	86	0	Accident	3
35	18	29	Blaine Perkins	RSS Racing	Ford	86	0	Accident	2
36	26	9	Brandon Jones	JR Motorsports	Chevrolet	38	0	Engine	1
37	11	16	A. J. Allmendinger	Kaulig Racing	Chevrolet	32	0	Accident	1
38	38	53	Glen Reen	Joey Gase Motorsports	Chevrolet	20	0	Carburetor	1
Official race results

== Standings after the race ==
Drivers' Championship standings

	Pos	Driver	Points
	1	Cole Custer	547
1	2	Chandler Smith	546 (-1)
1	3	Austin Hill	506 (–41)
	4	Justin Allgaier	503 (–44)
	5	Jesse Love	442 (–105)
2	6	Sheldon Creed	442 (–105)
	7	Riley Herbst	441 (–106)
2	8	A. J. Allmendinger	410 (–137)
	9	Parker Kligerman	405 (–142)
1	10	Sam Mayer	396 (–151)
1	11	Sammy Smith	381 (–166)
2	12	Shane van Gisbergen	365 (–182)
Official driver's standings

Manufacturers' Championship standings

Pos	Manufacturer	Points
1	Chevrolet	530
2	Toyota	494 (-36)
3	Ford	438 (–92)

- Note: Only the first 12 positions are included for the driver standings.

Previous race: 2024 Zip Buy Now, Pay Later 250	NASCAR Xfinity Series; 2024 season	Next race: 2024 SciAps 200
