= 2024 Pacific Office Automation 147 =

13th race of the 2024 NASCAR Xfinity Series

Race details
- Race 13 of 23 of the 2024 NASCAR Xfinity Series
- Date: June 1, 2024
- Location: Portland International Raceway in Portland, Oregon
- Course: Permanent racing facility
- Course length: 1.967 miles (3.166 km)
- Distance: 75 laps, 147 mi (237 km)
- Scheduled distance: 75 laps, 147 mi (237 km)
- Average speed: 69.575 mph (111.970 km/h)

Pole position
| Driver | Sam Mayer | JR Motorsports |
- Time: 1:13.375

Most laps led
| Driver | Justin Allgaier | JR Motorsports |
- Laps: 46

Winner
| No. 97 | Shane van Gisbergen | Kaulig Racing |

Television in the United States
- Network: FS1
- Announcers: Adam Alexander, Trevor Bayne, and Jamie McMurray

Radio in the United States
- Radio: MRN

The 2024 Pacific Office Automation 147 was the 13th stock car race of the 2024 NASCAR Xfinity Series, and the third iteration of the event. The race was held on Saturday, June 1, 2024, in Portland, Oregon at Portland International Raceway, a 1.967 miles (3.166 km) permanent asphalt road course. The race took the scheduled 75 laps to complete. Shane van Gisbergen, driving for Kaulig Racing, would successfully take the lead from Justin Allgaier in the final stages of the race, and led the final four laps to earn his first career NASCAR Xfinity Series win. Allgaier had dominated the majority of the race, winning both stages and leading a race-high 46 laps, before falling back and finishing 2nd. To fill out the podium, Sammy Smith, driving for JR Motorsports, would finish in 3rd, respectively.

== Report ==
=== Background ===
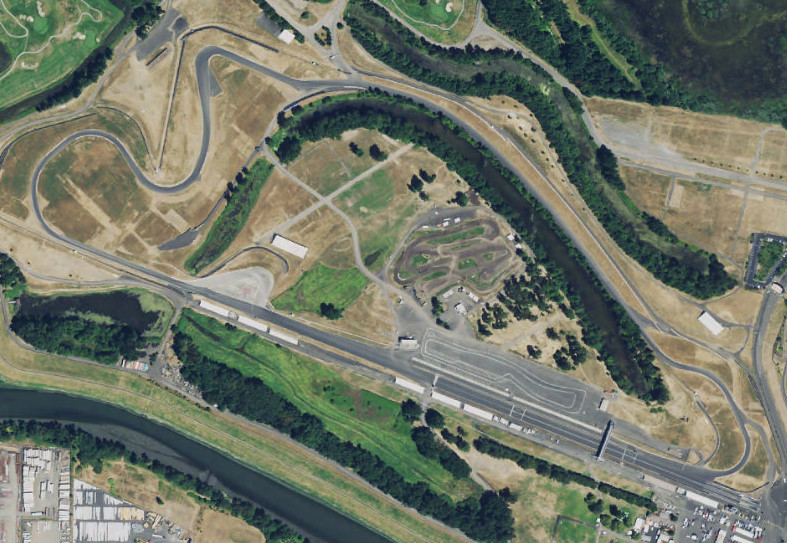
Portland International Raceway, the circuit where the race was held.

Portland International Raceway (PIR) is a motorsport facility in Portland in the U.S. state of Oregon. It is part of the Delta Park complex on the former site of Vanport, just south of the Columbia River. It lies west of the Delta Park/Vanport light rail station and less than a mile west of Interstate 5.

The track hosts the IndyCar Series, Formula E, ICSCC and SCCA and OMRRA road racing, the ARCA Menards Series West, the NASCAR Xfinity Series, and SCCA autocross events. Additionally, the PIR grounds are host to OBRA (Oregon Bicycle Racing Association) bicycling races on the track and the surrounding grounds. The facility includes a dragstrip and a motocross track.

==== Entry list ====
- (R) denotes rookie driver.

| # | Driver | Team | Make |
|---|---|---|---|
| 00 | Cole Custer | Stewart–Haas Racing | Ford |
| 1 | Sam Mayer | JR Motorsports | Chevrolet |
| 2 | Jesse Love (R) | Richard Childress Racing | Chevrolet |
| 4 | Garrett Smithley | JD Motorsports | Chevrolet |
| 5 | Anthony Alfredo | Our Motorsports | Chevrolet |
| 6 | Patrick Gallagher | JD Motorsports | Chevrolet |
| 07 | Logan Bearden | SS-Green Light Racing | Chevrolet |
| 7 | Justin Allgaier | JR Motorsports | Chevrolet |
| 8 | Sammy Smith | JR Motorsports | Chevrolet |
| 9 | Brandon Jones | JR Motorsports | Chevrolet |
| 11 | Josh Williams | Kaulig Racing | Chevrolet |
| 14 | Andre Castro | SS-Green Light Racing | Chevrolet |
| 15 | Hailie Deegan (R) | AM Racing | Ford |
| 16 | A. J. Allmendinger | Kaulig Racing | Chevrolet |
| 18 | Sheldon Creed | Joe Gibbs Racing | Toyota |
| 19 | Josh Bilicki | Joe Gibbs Racing | Toyota |
| 20 | Ryan Truex | Joe Gibbs Racing | Toyota |
| 21 | Austin Hill | Richard Childress Racing | Chevrolet |
| 24 | Ed Jones | Sam Hunt Racing | Toyota |
| 26 | Sage Karam | Sam Hunt Racing | Toyota |
| 27 | Jeb Burton | Jordan Anderson Racing | Chevrolet |
| 28 | Kyle Sieg | RSS Racing | Ford |
| 29 | Blaine Perkins | RSS Racing | Ford |
| 31 | Parker Retzlaff | Jordan Anderson Racing | Chevrolet |
| 32 | Austin Green | Jordan Anderson Racing | Chevrolet |
| 35 | Frankie Muniz | Joey Gase Motorsports | Ford |
| 36 | Preston Pardus | DGM Racing | Chevrolet |
| 38 | Matt DiBenedetto | RSS Racing | Ford |
| 39 | Ryan Sieg | RSS Racing | Ford |
| 42 | Leland Honeyman (R) | Young's Motorsports | Chevrolet |
| 43 | Ryan Ellis | Alpha Prime Racing | Chevrolet |
| 44 | Brennan Poole | Alpha Prime Racing | Chevrolet |
| 48 | Parker Kligerman | Big Machine Racing | Chevrolet |
| 51 | Jeremy Clements | Jeremy Clements Racing | Chevrolet |
| 81 | Chandler Smith | Joe Gibbs Racing | Toyota |
| 91 | Kyle Weatherman | DGM Racing | Chevrolet |
| 92 | Nathan Byrd | DGM Racing | Chevrolet |
| 97 | Shane van Gisbergen (R) | Kaulig Racing | Chevrolet |
| 98 | Riley Herbst | Stewart–Haas Racing | Ford |
Official entry list

== Practice ==
The first and only practice was held on Saturday, June 1, at 8:30 AM PST, and would last for 20 minutes. Sam Mayer, driving for JR Motorsports, would set the fastest time in the session, with a lap of 1:14.493, and a speed of 95.204 mph (153.216 km/h).

| Pos. | # | Driver | Team | Make | Time | Speed |
|---|---|---|---|---|---|---|
| 1 | 1 | Sam Mayer | JR Motorsports | Chevrolet | 1:14.493 | 95.204 |
| 2 | 97 | Shane van Gisbergen (R) | Kaulig Racing | Chevrolet | 1:14.572 | 95.103 |
| 3 | 18 | Sheldon Creed | Joe Gibbs Racing | Toyota | 1:14.653 | 95.000 |
Full practice results

== Qualifying ==
Qualifying was held on Saturday, June 1, at 9:00 AM PST. Since Portland International Raceway is a road course, the qualifying system is a two group system, with two rounds. Drivers will be separated into two groups, Group A and Group B. Each driver will have multiple laps to set a time. The fastest 5 drivers from each group will advance to the final round. The fastest driver to set a time in that round will win the pole.

Under a 2021 rule change, the timing line in road course qualifying is "not" the start-finish line. Instead, the timing line for qualifying will be set at the exit of Turn 11. Sam Mayer, driving for JR Motorsports, would win the pole after advancing from the preliminary round and setting the fastest time in Round 2, with a lap of 1:13.375, and a speed of 96.654 mph (155.550 km/h).

Frankie Muniz was the only driver who failed to qualify.

=== Qualifying results ===
| Pos. | # | Driver | Team | Make | Time (R1) | Speed (R1) | Time (R2) | Speed (R2) |
|---|---|---|---|---|---|---|---|---|
| 1 | 1 | Sam Mayer | JR Motorsports | Chevrolet | 1:13.500 | 96.490 | 1:13.375 | 96.654 |
| 2 | 97 | Shane van Gisbergen (R) | Kaulig Racing | Chevrolet | 1:13.588 | 96.374 | 1:13.419 | 96.596 |
| 3 | 98 | Riley Herbst | Stewart–Haas Racing | Ford | 1:13.379 | 96.649 | 1:13.748 | 96.165 |
| 4 | 00 | Cole Custer | Stewart–Haas Racing | Ford | 1:13.751 | 96.161 | 1:13.823 | 96.068 |
| 5 | 7 | Justin Allgaier | JR Motorsports | Chevrolet | 1:13.746 | 96.168 | 1:13.823 | 96.068 |
| 6 | 18 | Sheldon Creed | Joe Gibbs Racing | Toyota | 1:13.982 | 95.861 | 1:13.928 | 95.931 |
| 7 | 48 | Parker Kligerman | Big Machine Racing | Chevrolet | 1:13.721 | 96.201 | 1:13.934 | 95.923 |
| 8 | 19 | Josh Bilicki | Joe Gibbs Racing | Toyota | 1:14.030 | 95.799 | 1:13.991 | 95.849 |
| 9 | 8 | Sammy Smith | JR Motorsports | Chevrolet | 1:14.042 | 95.783 | 1:14.385 | 95.342 |
| 10 | 16 | A. J. Allmendinger | Kaulig Racing | Chevrolet | 1:13.571 | 96.397 | — | — |
Eliminated in Round 1
| 11 | 81 | Chandler Smith | Joe Gibbs Racing | Toyota | 1:14.030 | 95.799 | — | — |
| 12 | 2 | Jesse Love (R) | Richard Childress Racing | Chevrolet | 1:14.115 | 95.689 | — | — |
| 13 | 20 | Ryan Truex | Joe Gibbs Racing | Toyota | 1:14.185 | 95.599 | — | — |
| 14 | 26 | Sage Karam | Sam Hunt Racing | Toyota | 1:14.218 | 95.556 | — | — |
| 15 | 31 | Parker Retzlaff | Jordan Anderson Racing | Chevrolet | 1:14.285 | 95.470 | — | — |
| 16 | 27 | Jeb Burton | Jordan Anderson Racing | Chevrolet | 1:14.331 | 95.411 | — | — |
| 17 | 24 | Ed Jones | Sam Hunt Racing | Toyota | 1:14.365 | 95.367 | — | — |
| 18 | 21 | Austin Hill | Richard Childress Racing | Chevrolet | 1:14.374 | 95.356 | — | — |
| 19 | 5 | Anthony Alfredo | Our Motorsports | Chevrolet | 1:14.391 | 95.334 | — | — |
| 20 | 9 | Brandon Jones | JR Motorsports | Chevrolet | 1:14.605 | 95.061 | — | — |
| 21 | 36 | Preston Pardus | DGM Racing | Chevrolet | 1:14.617 | 95.045 | — | — |
| 22 | 11 | Josh Williams | Kaulig Racing | Chevrolet | 1:14.661 | 94.989 | — | — |
| 23 | 91 | Kyle Weatherman | DGM Racing | Chevrolet | 1:14.790 | 94.826 | — | — |
| 24 | 39 | Ryan Sieg | RSS Racing | Ford | 1:14.834 | 94.770 | — | — |
| 25 | 43 | Ryan Ellis | Alpha Prime Racing | Chevrolet | 1:14.891 | 94.698 | — | — |
| 26 | 32 | Austin Green | Jordan Anderson Racing | Chevrolet | 1:14.927 | 94.652 | — | — |
| 27 | 51 | Jeremy Clements | Jeremy Clements Racing | Chevrolet | 1:15.032 | 94.520 | — | — |
| 28 | 44 | Brennan Poole | Alpha Prime Racing | Chevrolet | 1:15.126 | 94.401 | — | — |
| 29 | 38 | Matt DiBenedetto | RSS Racing | Ford | 1:15.132 | 94.394 | — | — |
| 30 | 14 | Andre Castro | SS-Green Light Racing | Chevrolet | 1:15.200 | 94.309 | — | — |
| 31 | 29 | Blaine Perkins | RSS Racing | Ford | 1:15.379 | 94.085 | — | — |
| 32 | 42 | Leland Honeyman (R) | Young's Motorsports | Chevrolet | 1:15.890 | 93.451 | — | — |
| 33 | 07 | Logan Bearden | SS-Green Light Racing | Chevrolet | 1:16.107 | 93.185 | — | — |
Qualified by owner's points
| 34 | 4 | Garrett Smithley | JD Motorsports | Chevrolet | 1:16.244 | 93.017 | — | — |
| 35 | 92 | Nathan Byrd | DGM Racing | Chevrolet | 1:16.452 | 92.764 | — | — |
| 36 | 6 | Patrick Gallagher | JD Motorsports | Chevrolet | 1:16.497 | 92.710 | — | — |
| 37 | 28 | Kyle Sieg | RSS Racing | Ford | 1:17.114 | 91.968 | — | — |
| 38 | 15 | Hailie Deegan (R) | AM Racing | Ford | 1:17.178 | 91.891 | — | — |
Failed to qualify
| 39 | 35 | Frankie Muniz | Joey Gase Motorsports | Ford | — | — | — | — |
Official qualifying results
Official starting lineup

== Race results ==
Stage 1 Laps: 25

| Pos. | # | Driver | Team | Make | Pts |
|---|---|---|---|---|---|
| 1 | 7 | Justin Allgaier | JR Motorsports | Chevrolet | 10 |
| 2 | 98 | Riley Herbst | Stewart–Haas Racing | Ford | 9 |
| 3 | 18 | Sheldon Creed | Joe Gibbs Racing | Toyota | 8 |
| 4 | 19 | Josh Bilicki | Joe Gibbs Racing | Toyota | 7 |
| 5 | 48 | Parker Kligerman | Big Machine Racing | Chevrolet | 6 |
| 6 | 8 | Sammy Smith | JR Motorsports | Chevrolet | 5 |
| 7 | 00 | Cole Custer | Stewart–Haas Racing | Ford | 4 |
| 8 | 20 | Ryan Truex | Joe Gibbs Racing | Toyota | 3 |
| 9 | 21 | Austin Hill | Richard Childress Racing | Chevrolet | 2 |
| 10 | 26 | Sage Karam | Sam Hunt Racing | Toyota | 1 |

Stage 2 Laps: 25

| Pos. | # | Driver | Team | Make | Pts |
|---|---|---|---|---|---|
| 1 | 7 | Justin Allgaier | JR Motorsports | Chevrolet | 10 |
| 2 | 18 | Sheldon Creed | Joe Gibbs Racing | Toyota | 9 |
| 3 | 19 | Josh Bilicki | Joe Gibbs Racing | Toyota | 8 |
| 4 | 00 | Cole Custer | Stewart–Haas Racing | Ford | 7 |
| 5 | 97 | Shane van Gisbergen (R) | Kaulig Racing | Chevrolet | 6 |
| 6 | 81 | Chandler Smith | Joe Gibbs Racing | Toyota | 5 |
| 7 | 98 | Riley Herbst | Stewart–Haas Racing | Ford | 4 |
| 8 | 26 | Sage Karam | Sam Hunt Racing | Toyota | 3 |
| 9 | 1 | Sam Mayer | JR Motorsports | Chevrolet | 2 |
| 10 | 24 | Ed Jones | Sam Hunt Racing | Toyota | 1 |

Stage 3 Laps: 25

| Fin | St | # | Driver | Team | Make | Laps | Led | Status | Pts |
|---|---|---|---|---|---|---|---|---|---|
| 1 | 2 | 97 | Shane van Gisbergen (R) | Kaulig Racing | Chevrolet | 75 | 12 | Running | 46 |
| 2 | 5 | 7 | Justin Allgaier | JR Motorsports | Chevrolet | 75 | 46 | Running | 55 |
| 3 | 9 | 8 | Sammy Smith | JR Motorsports | Chevrolet | 75 | 0 | Running | 39 |
| 4 | 10 | 16 | A. J. Allmendinger | Kaulig Racing | Chevrolet | 75 | 0 | Running | 33 |
| 5 | 17 | 24 | Ed Jones | Sam Hunt Racing | Toyota | 75 | 0 | Running | 33 |
| 6 | 4 | 00 | Cole Custer | Stewart–Haas Racing | Ford | 75 | 0 | Running | 42 |
| 7 | 22 | 11 | Josh Williams | Kaulig Racing | Chevrolet | 75 | 0 | Running | 30 |
| 8 | 7 | 48 | Parker Kligerman | Big Machine Racing | Chevrolet | 75 | 0 | Running | 35 |
| 9 | 15 | 31 | Parker Retzlaff | Jordan Anderson Racing | Chevrolet | 75 | 0 | Running | 28 |
| 10 | 3 | 98 | Riley Herbst | Stewart–Haas Racing | Ford | 75 | 15 | Running | 40 |
| 11 | 18 | 21 | Austin Hill | Richard Childress Racing | Chevrolet | 75 | 0 | Running | 28 |
| 12 | 8 | 19 | Josh Bilicki | Joe Gibbs Racing | Toyota | 75 | 0 | Running | 40 |
| 13 | 6 | 18 | Sheldon Creed | Joe Gibbs Racing | Toyota | 75 | 2 | Running | 41 |
| 14 | 24 | 39 | Ryan Sieg | RSS Racing | Ford | 75 | 0 | Running | 23 |
| 15 | 26 | 32 | Austin Green | Jordan Anderson Racing | Chevrolet | 75 | 0 | Running | 22 |
| 16 | 28 | 44 | Brennan Poole | Alpha Prime Racing | Chevrolet | 75 | 0 | Running | 21 |
| 17 | 25 | 43 | Ryan Ellis | Alpha Prime Racing | Chevrolet | 75 | 0 | Running | 20 |
| 18 | 37 | 28 | Kyle Sieg | RSS Racing | Ford | 75 | 0 | Running | 19 |
| 19 | 12 | 2 | Jesse Love (R) | Richard Childress Racing | Chevrolet | 75 | 0 | Running | 18 |
| 20 | 31 | 29 | Blaine Perkins | RSS Racing | Ford | 75 | 0 | Running | 17 |
| 21 | 35 | 92 | Nathan Byrd | DGM Racing | Chevrolet | 75 | 0 | Running | 16 |
| 22 | 34 | 4 | Garrett Smithley | JD Motorsports | Chevrolet | 75 | 0 | Running | 15 |
| 23 | 30 | 14 | Andre Castro | SS-Green Light Racing | Chevrolet | 75 | 0 | Running | 14 |
| 24 | 36 | 6 | Patrick Gallagher | JD Motorsports | Chevrolet | 75 | 0 | Running | 13 |
| 25 | 23 | 91 | Kyle Weatherman | DGM Racing | Chevrolet | 75 | 0 | Running | 12 |
| 26 | 32 | 42 | Leland Honeyman (R) | Young's Motorsports | Chevrolet | 75 | 0 | Running | 11 |
| 27 | 13 | 20 | Ryan Truex | Joe Gibbs Racing | Toyota | 75 | 0 | Running | 13 |
| 28 | 1 | 1 | Sam Mayer | JR Motorsports | Chevrolet | 74 | 0 | Running | 11 |
| 29 | 33 | 07 | Logan Bearden | SS-Green Light Racing | Chevrolet | 74 | 0 | Running | 8 |
| 30 | 27 | 51 | Jeremy Clements | Jeremy Clements Racing | Chevrolet | 73 | 0 | Running | 7 |
| 31 | 29 | 38 | Matt DiBenedetto | RSS Racing | Ford | 73 | 0 | Running | 6 |
| 32 | 19 | 5 | Anthony Alfredo | Our Motorsports | Chevrolet | 72 | 0 | Running | 5 |
| 33 | 38 | 15 | Hailie Deegan (R) | AM Racing | Ford | 71 | 0 | Running | 4 |
| 34 | 14 | 26 | Sage Karam | Sam Hunt Racing | Toyota | 69 | 0 | Running | 7 |
| 35 | 11 | 81 | Chandler Smith | Joe Gibbs Racing | Toyota | 66 | 0 | Accident | 7 |
| 36 | 20 | 9 | Brandon Jones | JR Motorsports | Chevrolet | 66 | 0 | Accident | 1 |
| 37 | 16 | 27 | Jeb Burton | Jordan Anderson Racing | Chevrolet | 61 | 0 | Running | 1 |
| 38 | 21 | 36 | Preston Pardus | DGM Racing | Chevrolet | 9 | 0 | Track Bar | 1 |
Official race results

== Standings after the race ==
Drivers' Championship standings

| | Pos | Driver | Points |
|---|---|---|---|
| 1 | 1 | Cole Custer | 475 |
| 1 | 2 | Austin Hill | 457 (-18) |
| 2 | 3 | Chandler Smith | 433 (–18) |
| | 4 | Justin Allgaier | 452 (–23) |
| | 5 | Jesse Love | 402 (–73) |
| | 6 | A. J. Allmendinger | 380 (–95) |
| | 7 | Riley Herbst | 378 (–97) |
| | 8 | Sheldon Creed | 354 (–121) |
| | 9 | Parker Kligerman | 342 (–133) |
| 3 | 10 | Sammy Smith | 328 (–147) |
| 3 | 11 | Ryan Sieg | 308 (–167) |
| 1 | 12 | Sam Mayer | 305 (–170) |
Official driver's standings

Manufacturers' Championship standings

| Pos | Manufacturer | Points |
|---|---|---|
| 1 | Chevrolet | 450 |
| 2 | Toyota | 425 (-25) |
| 3 | Ford | 375 (–75) |

- Note: Only the first 12 positions are included for the driver standings.

| Previous race: 2024 BetMGM 300 | NASCAR Xfinity Series; 2024 season | Next race: 2024 Zip Buy Now, Pay Later 250 |
