= 2024 Zip Buy Now, Pay Later 250 =

14th race of the 2024 NASCAR Xfinity Series

Race details
- Race 14 of 33 of the 2024 NASCAR Xfinity Series
- Date: June 8, 2024
- Official name: 2nd Annual Zip Buy Now, Pay Later 250
- Location: Sonoma Raceway in Sonoma, California
- Course: Permanent racing facility
- Course length: 1.99 miles (3.20 km)
- Distance: 79 laps, 156 mi (251 km)
- Scheduled distance: 79 laps, 156 mi (251 km)
- Average speed: 71.986 mph (115.850 km/h)

Pole position
Driver	Shane van Gisbergen	Kaulig Racing
- Time: 1:14.677

Most laps led
Driver	Shane van Gisbergen	Kaulig Racing
- Laps: 32

Winner
No. 97	Shane van Gisbergen	Kaulig Racing

Television in the United States
- Network: FS1
- Announcers: Adam Alexander, Joey Logano, and Daniel Suárez

Radio in the United States
- Radio: PRN

The 2024 Zip Buy Now, Pay Later 250 was the 14th stock car race of the 2024 NASCAR Xfinity Series, and the 2nd iteration of the event. The race was held on Saturday, June 8, 2024, in Sonoma, California at Sonoma Raceway, a 1.99 miles (3.20 km) permanent asphalt road course. The race took the scheduled 79 laps to complete. Shane van Gisbergen, driving for Kaulig Racing, would cruise to a dominating victory, winning the pole and leading a race-high 32 laps to earn his second career NASCAR Xfinity Series win, and his second consecutive win of the season. Ty Gibbs led 26 laps in the race, before being involved in late race pileup on lap 49. To fill out the podium, Sheldon Creed, driving for Joe Gibbs Racing, and Sam Mayer, driving for JR Motorsports, would finish 2nd and 3rd, respectively.

== Background ==
Sonoma Raceway is a 1.99-mile (3.20 km) road course and drag strip located on the landform known as Sears Point in the southern Sonoma Mountains in Sonoma, California, U.S. The road course features 12 turns on a hilly course with 160 feet (49 m) of total elevation change. It is host to one of only seven NASCAR Cup Series races each year that are run on road courses. It is also host to the NTT IndyCar Series and several other auto races and motorcycle races such as the American Federation of Motorcyclists series. Sonoma Raceway continues to host amateur, or club racing events which may or may not be open to the general public. The largest such car club is the Sports Car Club of America. This would be the second race for the NASCAR Xfinity Series at Sonoma Raceway, since the inaugural iteration in 2023.

=== Entry list ===
- (R) denotes rookie driver.

#	Driver	Team	Make
00	Cole Custer	Stewart–Haas Racing	Ford
1	Sam Mayer	JR Motorsports	Chevrolet
2	Jesse Love (R)	Richard Childress Racing	Chevrolet
4	Garrett Smithley	JD Motorsports	Chevrolet
5	Anthony Alfredo	Our Motorsports	Chevrolet
6	Thomas Annunziata	JD Motorsports	Chevrolet
07	Alex Labbé	SS-Green Light Racing	Chevrolet
7	Justin Allgaier	JR Motorsports	Chevrolet
8	Sammy Smith	JR Motorsports	Chevrolet
9	Brandon Jones	JR Motorsports	Chevrolet
11	Josh Williams	Kaulig Racing	Chevrolet
14	Brad Perez	SS-Green Light Racing	Ford
15	Hailie Deegan (R)	AM Racing	Ford
16	A. J. Allmendinger	Kaulig Racing	Chevrolet
17	Boris Said	Hendrick Motorsports	Chevrolet
18	Sheldon Creed	Joe Gibbs Racing	Toyota
19	Ty Gibbs (i)	Joe Gibbs Racing	Toyota
20	John Hunter Nemechek (i)	Joe Gibbs Racing	Toyota
21	Austin Hill	Richard Childress Racing	Chevrolet
26	Ed Jones	Sam Hunt Racing	Toyota
27	Jeb Burton	Jordan Anderson Racing	Chevrolet
28	Kyle Sieg	RSS Racing	Ford
29	Blaine Perkins	RSS Racing	Ford
31	Parker Retzlaff	Jordan Anderson Racing	Chevrolet
32	Austin Green	Jordan Anderson Racing	Chevrolet
35	Sage Karam	Joey Gase Motorsports	Toyota
38	Matt DiBenedetto	RSS Racing	Ford
39	Ryan Sieg	RSS Racing	Ford
42	Leland Honeyman (R)	Young's Motorsports	Chevrolet
43	Ryan Ellis	Alpha Prime Racing	Chevrolet
44	Brennan Poole	Alpha Prime Racing	Chevrolet
48	Parker Kligerman	Big Machine Racing	Chevrolet
50	Preston Pardus	Pardus Racing	Chevrolet
51	Jeremy Clements	Jeremy Clements Racing	Chevrolet
81	Chandler Smith	Joe Gibbs Racing	Toyota
91	Kyle Weatherman	DGM Racing	Chevrolet
92	Josh Bilicki	DGM Racing	Chevrolet
97	Shane van Gisbergen (R)	Kaulig Racing	Chevrolet
98	Riley Herbst	Stewart–Haas Racing	Ford
Official entry list

== Practice ==
The first and only practice was held on Friday, June 7, at 1:05 PM PST, and would last for 50 minutes. Shane van Gisbergen, driving for Kaulig Racing, would set the fastest time in the session, with a lap of 1:15.290, and a speed of 95.152 mph (153.132 km/h).

Pos.	#	Driver	Team	Make	Time	Speed
1	97	Shane van Gisbergen (R)	Kaulig Racing	Chevrolet	1:15.290	95.152
2	48	Parker Kligerman	Big Machine Racing	Chevrolet	1:15.599	94.763
3	19	Ty Gibbs (i)	Joe Gibbs Racing	Toyota	1:15.606	94.754
Official practice results

== Qualifying ==
Qualifying was held on Saturday, June 8, at 12:30 PM PST. Since Sonoma Raceway is a road course, the qualifying system is a two group system, with two rounds. Drivers will be separated into two groups, Group A and Group B. Each driver will have multiple laps to set a time. The fastest 5 drivers from each group will advance to the final round. The fastest driver to set a time in that round will win the pole.

Under a 2021 rule change, the timing line in road course qualifying is "not" the start-finish line. Instead, the timing line for qualifying will be set at the entrance of Turn 10. Shane van Gisbergen, driving for Kaulig Racing, would win the pole after advancing from the preliminary round and setting the fastest time in Round 2, with a lap of 1:14.677, and a speed of 95.933 mph (154.389 km/h).

Sage Karam was the only driver who failed to qualify.

=== Qualifying results ===
Pos.	#	Driver	Team	Make	Time (R1)	Speed (R1)	Time (R2)	Speed (R2)
1	97	Shane van Gisbergen (R)	Kaulig Racing	Chevrolet	1:14.804	95.770	1:14.677	95.933
2	19	Ty Gibbs (i)	Joe Gibbs Racing	Toyota	1:15.348	95.079	1:15.049	95.458
3	21	Austin Hill	Richard Childress Racing	Chevrolet	1:15.379	95.040	1:15.118	95.370
4	16	A. J. Allmendinger	Kaulig Racing	Chevrolet	1:15.638	94.714	1:15.379	95.040
5	7	Justin Allgaier	JR Motorsports	Chevrolet	1:15.531	94.848	1:15.403	95.009
6	2	Jesse Love (R)	Richard Childress Racing	Chevrolet	1:15.415	94.994	1:15.459	94.939
7	20	John Hunter Nemechek (i)	Joe Gibbs Racing	Toyota	1:15.381	95.037	1:15.609	94.751
8	1	Sam Mayer	JR Motorsports	Chevrolet	1:15.742	94.584	1:15.637	94.716
9	18	Sheldon Creed	Joe Gibbs Racing	Toyota	1:15.427	94.979	1:15.710	94.624
10	8	Sammy Smith	JR Motorsports	Chevrolet	1:15.855	94.443	1:15.802	94.509
Eliminated in Round 1
11	81	Chandler Smith	Joe Gibbs Racing	Toyota	1:15.724	94.607	—	—
12	00	Cole Custer	Stewart–Haas Racing	Ford	1:15.759	94.563	—	—
13	31	Parker Retzlaff	Jordan Anderson Racing	Chevrolet	1:15.868	94.427	—	—
14	48	Parker Kligerman	Big Machine Racing	Chevrolet	1:15.899	94.389	—	—
15	98	Riley Herbst	Stewart–Haas Racing	Ford	1:15.922	94.360	—	—
16	5	Anthony Alfredo	Our Motorsports	Chevrolet	1:16.084	94.159	—	—
17	26	Ed Jones	Sam Hunt Racing	Toyota	1:16.130	94.102	—	—
18	39	Ryan Sieg	RSS Racing	Ford	1:16.172	94.050	—	—
19	07	Alex Labbé	SS-Green Light Racing	Chevrolet	1:16.423	93.741	—	—
20	27	Jeb Burton	Jordan Anderson Racing	Chevrolet	1:16.489	93.661	—	—
21	29	Blaine Perkins	RSS Racing	Ford	1:16.519	93.624	—	—
22	32	Austin Green	Jordan Anderson Racing	Chevrolet	1:16.538	93.601	—	—
23	51	Jeremy Clements	Jeremy Clements Racing	Chevrolet	1:16.544	93.593	—	—
24	50	Preston Pardus	Pardus Racing	Chevrolet	1:16.566	93.566	—	—
25	91	Kyle Weatherman	DGM Racing	Chevrolet	1:16.594	93.532	—	—
26	6	Thomas Annunziata	JD Motorsports	Chevrolet	1:16.608	93.515	—	—
27	9	Brandon Jones	JR Motorsports	Chevrolet	1:16.621	93.499	—	—
28	11	Josh Williams	Kaulig Racing	Chevrolet	1:16.809	93.270	—	—
29	42	Leland Honeyman (R)	Young's Motorsports	Chevrolet	1:16.825	93.251	—	—
30	14	Brad Perez	SS-Green Light Racing	Ford	1:16.924	93.131	—	—
31	92	Josh Bilicki	DGM Racing	Chevrolet	1:16.940	93.112	—	—
32	28	Kyle Sieg	RSS Racing	Ford	1:16.942	93.109	—	—
33	44	Brennan Poole	Alpha Prime Racing	Chevrolet	1:17.000	93.039	—	—
Qualified by owner's points
34	43	Ryan Ellis	Alpha Prime Racing	Chevrolet	1:17.060	92.967	—	—
35	17	Boris Said	Hendrick Motorsports	Chevrolet	1:17.068	92.957	—	—
36	38	Matt DiBenedetto	RSS Racing	Ford	1:17.148	92.860	—	—
37	15	Hailie Deegan (R)	AM Racing	Ford	1:17.159	92.847	—	—
38	4	Garrett Smithley	JD Motorsports	Chevrolet	1:18.394	91.385	—	—
Failed to qualify
39	35	Sage Karam	Joey Gase Motorsports	Toyota	1:17.063	92.963	—	—
Official qualifying results
Official starting lineup

== Race results ==
Stage 1 Laps: 20

Pos.	#	Driver	Team	Make	Pts
1	97	Shane van Gisbergen (R)	Kaulig Racing	Chevrolet	10
2	16	A. J. Allmendinger	Kaulig Racing	Chevrolet	9
3	21	Austin Hill	Richard Childress Racing	Chevrolet	8
4	48	Parker Kligerman	Big Machine Racing	Chevrolet	7
5	20	John Hunter Nemechek (i)	Joe Gibbs Racing	Toyota	0
6	81	Chandler Smith	Joe Gibbs Racing	Toyota	5
7	8	Sammy Smith	JR Motorsports	Chevrolet	4
8	5	Anthony Alfredo	Our Motorsports	Chevrolet	3
9	31	Parker Retzlaff	Jordan Anderson Racing	Chevrolet	2
10	98	Riley Herbst	Stewart–Haas Racing	Ford	1

Stage 2 Laps: 25

Pos.	#	Driver	Team	Make	Pts
1	19	Ty Gibbs (i)	Joe Gibbs Racing	Toyota	0
2	97	Shane van Gisbergen (R)	Kaulig Racing	Chevrolet	9
3	2	Jesse Love (R)	Richard Childress Racing	Chevrolet	8
4	18	Sheldon Creed	Joe Gibbs Racing	Toyota	7
5	00	Cole Custer	Stewart–Haas Racing	Ford	6
6	81	Chandler Smith	Joe Gibbs Racing	Toyota	5
7	20	John Hunter Nemechek (i)	Joe Gibbs Racing	Toyota	0
8	48	Parker Kligerman	Big Machine Racing	Chevrolet	3
9	7	Justin Allgaier	JR Motorsports	Chevrolet	2
10	31	Parker Retzlaff	Jordan Anderson Racing	Chevrolet	1

Stage 3 Laps: 34

Fin	St	#	Driver	Team	Make	Laps	Led	Status	Pts
1	1	97	Shane van Gisbergen (R)	Kaulig Racing	Chevrolet	79	32	Running	59
2	9	18	Sheldon Creed	Joe Gibbs Racing	Toyota	79	0	Running	42
3	8	1	Sam Mayer	JR Motorsports	Chevrolet	79	0	Running	34
4	22	32	Austin Green	Jordan Anderson Racing	Chevrolet	79	0	Running	33
5	3	21	Austin Hill	Richard Childress Racing	Chevrolet	79	21	Running	40
6	5	7	Justin Allgaier	JR Motorsports	Chevrolet	79	0	Running	33
7	11	81	Chandler Smith	Joe Gibbs Racing	Toyota	79	0	Running	40
8	7	20	John Hunter Nemechek (i)	Joe Gibbs Racing	Toyota	79	0	Running	0
9	12	00	Cole Custer	Stewart–Haas Racing	Ford	79	0	Running	34
10	14	48	Parker Kligerman	Big Machine Racing	Chevrolet	79	0	Running	37
11	13	31	Parker Retzlaff	Jordan Anderson Racing	Chevrolet	79	0	Running	29
12	6	2	Jesse Love (R)	Richard Childress Racing	Chevrolet	79	0	Running	33
13	15	98	Riley Herbst	Stewart–Haas Racing	Ford	79	0	Running	25
14	33	44	Brennan Poole	Alpha Prime Racing	Chevrolet	79	0	Running	23
15	17	26	Ed Jones	Sam Hunt Racing	Toyota	79	0	Running	22
16	31	92	Josh Bilicki	DGM Racing	Chevrolet	79	0	Running	21
17	4	16	A. J. Allmendinger	Kaulig Racing	Chevrolet	79	0	Running	29
18	21	29	Blaine Perkins	RSS Racing	Ford	79	0	Running	19
19	19	07	Alex Labbé	SS-Green Light Racing	Chevrolet	79	0	Running	18
20	18	39	Ryan Sieg	RSS Racing	Ford	79	0	Running	17
21	36	38	Matt DiBenedetto	RSS Racing	Ford	79	0	Running	16
22	23	51	Jeremy Clements	Jeremy Clements Racing	Chevrolet	79	0	Running	15
23	32	28	Kyle Sieg	RSS Racing	Ford	79	0	Running	14
24	30	14	Brad Perez	SS-Green Light Racing	Ford	79	0	Running	13
25	24	50	Preston Pardus	Pardus Racing	Chevrolet	79	0	Running	12
26	34	43	Ryan Ellis	Alpha Prime Racing	Chevrolet	79	0	Running	11
27	38	4	Garrett Smithley	JD Motorsports	Chevrolet	79	0	Running	10
28	35	17	Boris Said	Hendrick Motorsports	Chevrolet	79	0	Running	9
29	29	42	Leland Honeyman (R)	Young's Motorsports	Chevrolet	78	0	Running	8
30	25	91	Kyle Weatherman	DGM Racing	Chevrolet	78	0	Running	7
31	16	5	Anthony Alfredo	Our Motorsports	Chevrolet	77	0	Running	9
32	37	15	Hailie Deegan (R)	AM Racing	Ford	72	0	Running	5
33	10	8	Sammy Smith	JR Motorsports	Chevrolet	71	0	Running	8
34	26	6	Thomas Annunziata	JD Motorsports	Chevrolet	63	0	Transmission	3
35	2	19	Ty Gibbs (i)	Joe Gibbs Racing	Toyota	50	26	Accident	0
36	20	27	Jeb Burton	Jordan Anderson Racing	Chevrolet	49	0	Accident	1
37	28	11	Josh Williams	Kaulig Racing	Chevrolet	49	0	Accident	1
38	27	9	Brandon Jones	JR Motorsports	Chevrolet	49	0	Accident	1
Official race results

== Standings after the race ==
Drivers' Championship standings

	Pos	Driver	Points
	1	Cole Custer	509
	2	Austin Hill	497 (-12)
	3	Chandler Smith	497 (–12)
	4	Justin Allgaier	485 (–24)
	5	Jesse Love	435 (–74)
	6	A. J. Allmendinger	409 (–100)
	7	Riley Herbst	403 (–106)
	8	Sheldon Creed	396 (–113)
	9	Parker Kligerman	379 (–130)
4	10	Shane van Gisbergen	362 (–147)
1	11	Sam Mayer	339 (–170)
2	12	Sammy Smith	336 (–173)
Official driver's standings

Manufacturers' Championship standings

Pos	Manufacturer	Points
1	Chevrolet	490
2	Toyota	460 (-30)
3	Ford	403 (–87)

- Note: Only the first 12 positions are included for the driver standings.

Previous race: 2024 Pacific Office Automation 147	NASCAR Xfinity Series; 2024 season	Next race: 2024 Hy-Vee PERKS 250
