= Dash 4 Cash =

Series of races in the NASCAR O'Reilly Auto Parts Series

- Logo for the event

Tournament information
- Sport: Auto racing
- Established: 2009
- Format: Bonus program
- Participants: NASCAR O'Reilly Auto Parts Series

The Dash 4 Cash is a bonus program for race winners for designated races in a NASCAR O'Reilly Auto Parts Series season. Since its inception in 2009, the program has undergone many changes, most notably the addition of heat races in 2016 for qualification for the bonus that were scrapped the following year.

== History ==
=== 2009–10: Inception ===
In order to drum up interest in its second-tier series, NASCAR made the Dash 4 Cash before the 2009 season. The original format included four races where all series regulars not competing in the Sprint Cup Series full-time could compete to win a $25,000 bonus on top of their race winnings if they won. If a Sprint Cup regular won, the money went to the next Dash 4 Cash race until an eligible driver won. The original four tracks were Nashville Superspeedway, Memphis Motorsports Park, Iowa Speedway, and Kentucky Speedway.

=== 2011–15: First overhaul ===
The first major changes were made in 2011, when the bonus purse was increased to $100,000. Another major change was that only the top four drivers in point eligible drivers in the previous race could be eligible for the next race, with the exception of the first race at Daytona International Speedway, for which the field was set by the top four drivers in Nationwide Series points after the Road America race. After the Daytona race, Dash 4 Cash races were held at Iowa Speedway, Richmond International Raceway, and Charlotte Motor Speedway. If any driver won all four races, Nationwide would give that driver an extra $600,000, totalling the bonuses at $1,000,000. The program received only minor changes over the next four years, like track changes. The program also expanded to include a parallel fan experience, with fans getting paired with eligible drivers. The fan paired with the driver who won the prize at that race (it changed each year) won a matching $100,000. When Xfinity took over as title sponsor in 2015, the schedule became more spread out, beginning earlier and ending later. Regan Smith created hype in 2015 when he won the first race at Charlotte, sparking speculation that he could win the $1 million bonus since the final race was at Darlington Raceway, where Smith's only Sprint Cup win took place. However, Smith did not win the million dollars.

=== 2016: Second overhaul ===
Before the 2016 season, NASCAR announced sweeping changes for the program, including adding heat races to determine qualifiers. The top two series points eligible drivers from each of the two heats would compete for the bonus. Erik Jones won the first race under the new format.

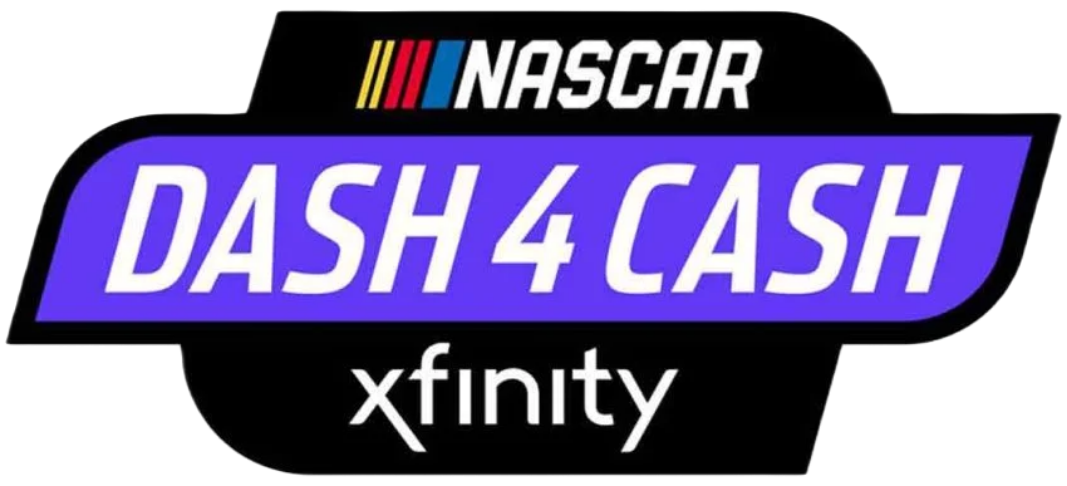
The old purple NASCAR Xfinity Series Dash 4 Cash logo

=== 2017–present ===
Prior to the start of the 2017 season, NASCAR unveiled a new race format that divided Cup and Xfinity races into three stages. The top-two Xfinity drivers in the first two stages would be Dash 4 Cash drivers for the four-driver final stage. The other two slots are determined by those who locked themselves into the main field. Phoenix International Raceway replaced Indianapolis as a Dash 4 Cash race. In addition, any Cup driver that has five or more years of Cup racing experience and not declaring to run for points in the Xfinity Series are banned to compete in Dash 4 Cash races. For 2018, the Phoenix date was taken away and replaced by the spring race at Talladega Superspeedway, making it the first year that all four events were run consecutively. The format was changed where the top-four Xfinity drivers from the previous race would be eligible the next week for the money. Additionally, until 2024, no driver running for NASCAR Cup Series points could participate in the Dash 4 Cash races. The Dash 4 Cash schedule remained the same for 2019.

For 2020, because of delays due to the COVID-19 pandemic, the Dash 4 Cash races started with qualifying at Bristol, then the four races were Atlanta, Homestead (Sunday), Talladega 1, and Pocono.

In 2021, the Dash 4 Cash schedule consisted of the first races at Martinsville, Talladega, and Darlington, with the single date at Dover concluding the event. The field for Martinsville will be determined by the results of the first Atlanta race.

For 2022 and 2023, the Dash 4 Cash races started with qualifying at Circuit of the Americas, then the four races were Richmond, Martinsville, Talladega 1 and Dover.

In 2024, the Dash 4 Cash schedule began with qualifying at Richmond, followed by the four races at Martinsville 1, Texas, Talladega 1, and the final race at Dover.

For 2025, the Dash 4 Cash qualifying began at Las Vegas, with the four races at Homestead-Miami, Martinsville 1, Bristol and finishing at Rockingham. This season also removed the Cup driver participation restriction, although the program remains open only to drivers running for Xfinity points.

When O'Reilly Auto Parts took over as title sponsor in 2026, the schedule continued to become more spread out, with the qualifying race at Rockingham and the four races at Bristol, Kansas, Talladega and finishing at Texas.

== Results ==
Year	Race 1		Race 2		Race 3		Race 4	
Year	Driver	Track	Driver	Track	Driver	Track	Driver	Track
2009	No award	Nashville	No award	Kentucky	Brad Keselowski	Iowa	Brad Keselowski	Memphis
2010	No award	Nashville	No award	Kentucky	No award	Iowa	No award	Memphis
2011	Reed Sorenson	Daytona	Ricky Stenhouse Jr.	Richmond	Reed Sorenson	Iowa	Elliott Sadler	Charlotte
2012	Austin Dillon	New Hampshire	Austin Dillon (2)	Chicagoland	Sam Hornish Jr.	Indianapolis	Elliott Sadler	Iowa
2013	Elliott Sadler	Daytona	Austin Dillon	New Hampshire	Elliott Sadler	Chicagoland	Brian Vickers	Indianapolis
2014	Regan Smith	New Hampshire	Austin Dillon	Chicagoland	Ty Dillon	Indianapolis	Trevor Bayne	Iowa
2015	Regan Smith	Dover	Regan Smith (2)	Indianapolis	Daniel Suárez	Bristol	Daniel Suárez (2)	Bristol
2016	Erik Jones	Bristol	Ty Dillon	Richmond	Erik Jones	Dover	Justin Allgaier	Indianapolis
2017	Justin Allgaier	Phoenix	Daniel Hemric	Bristol	Justin Allgaier	Richmond	William Byron	Dover
2018	Ryan Preece	Bristol	Elliott Sadler	Richmond	Tyler Reddick	Talladega	Justin Allgaier	Dover
2019	Christopher Bell	Bristol	Cole Custer	Richmond	Elliott Sadler	Talladega	Christopher Bell	Dover
2020	Noah Gragson	Atlanta	Ross Chastain	Talladega	A. J. Allmendinger	Homestead	Ross Chastain (2)	Pocono
2021	Noah Gragson	Martinsville	Noah Gragson (2)	Talladega	Noah Gragson (3)	Darlington	Josh Berry	Dover
2022	Sam Mayer	Richmond	A. J. Allmendinger	Martinsville	A. J. Allmendinger (2)	Talladega	Noah Gragson	Dover
2023	Justin Allgaier	Richmond	John Hunter Nemechek	Martinsville	Cole Custer	Talladega	Cole Custer (2)	Dover
2024	Aric Almirola	Martinsville	Sam Mayer	Texas	Ryan Sieg	Talladega	Anthony Alfredo	Dover
2025	Justin Allgaier	Homestead	Austin Hill	Martinsville	Justin Allgaier (2)	Bristol	Sammy Smith	Rockingham
2026	Justin Allgaier	Bristol	Sheldon Creed	Kansas	Sheldon Creed (2)	Talladega	Brent Crews	Texas

== See also ==
- Triple Truck Challenge
- NASCAR O'Reilly Auto Parts Series
