= Sam Mayer =

American racing driver (born 2003)

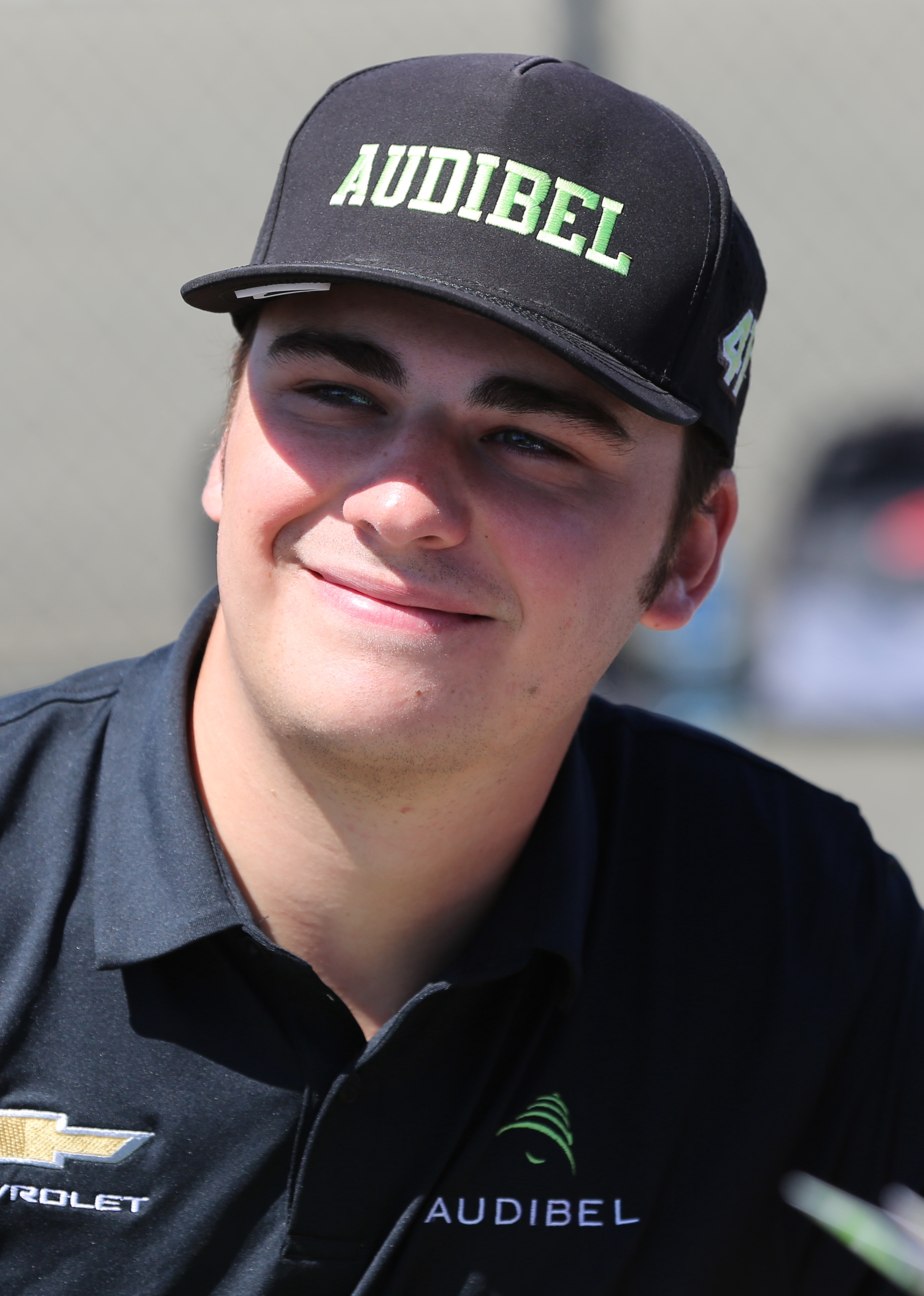
- Mayer at Sonoma Raceway in 2026
- Born: Samuel Adam Mayer; June 26, 2003 (age 23); Franklin, Wisconsin, U.S.
- Achievements: 2019, 2020 ARCA Menards Series East Champion; 2017 INEX Legends Car Young Lions National Champion; 2019 Bobby Isaac Memorial Winner
- Awards: 2018 CARS Late Model Stock Tour Rookie of the Year

NASCAR O'Reilly Auto Parts Series career
- 182 races run over 6 years
- Car no., team: No. 1 (JR Motorsports)
- 2026 position: 6th
- Best finish: 3rd (2023)
- First race: 2021 Pocono Green 225 (Pocono)
- Last race: 2026 O'Reilly Auto Parts 300 (Homestead)
- First win: 2023 Road America 180 (Road America)
- Last win: 2025 Hy-Vee PERKS 250 (Iowa)
Wins	Top tens	Poles
8	92	7

NASCAR FedEx Freight Truck Series career
- 14 races run over 3 years
- 2021 position: 100th
- Best finish: 27th (2020)
- First race: 2019 UNOH 200 (Bristol)
- Last race: 2021 UNOH 200 (Bristol)
- First win: 2020 UNOH 200 (Bristol)
Wins	Top tens	Poles
1	5	0

ARCA Menards Series career
- 28 races run over 4 years
- Best finish: 7th (2020)
- First race: 2018 Fans With Benefits 150 (Iowa)
- Last race: 2021 Bush's Beans 200 (Bristol)
- First win: 2020 Menards.com 200 (Toledo)
- Last win: 2020 Bush's Beans 200 (Bristol)
Wins	Top tens	Poles
5	23	1

ARCA Menards Series East career
- 26 races run over 4 years
- Best finish: 1st (2019, 2020)
- First race: 2018 United Site Services 70 (Loudon)
- Last race: 2021 Bush's Beans 200 (Bristol)
- First win: 2019 Zombie Auto 150 (Bristol)
- Last win: 2020 Pensacola 200 (Pensacola)
Wins	Top tens	Poles
9	21	5

ARCA Menards Series West career
- 5 races run over 4 years
- Best finish: 16th (2020)
- First race: 2018 Casey's General Store 150 (Iowa)
- Last race: 2024 General Tire 200 (Sonoma)
- First win: 2020 Star Nursery 150 (Las Vegas Bullring)
- Last win: 2024 General Tire 200 (Sonoma)
Wins	Top tens	Poles
2	3	3
- Statistics up to date as of November 7, 2026.

Samuel Adam Mayer (born June 26, 2003) is an American professional stock car racing driver. He competes full-time in the NASCAR O'Reilly Auto Parts Series, driving the No. 1 Chevrolet Camaro SS for JR Motorsports. His father is the founder of QPS Employment Group and a former IndyCar Series driver, Scott Mayer.

Mayer is the 2019 and 2020 East Series champion. He drove for GMS Racing (the other Drivers Edge Development team) both of those years in their No. 21 car and also won the inaugural championship of the ARCA Menards Series Sioux Chief Showdown in 2020. Mayer started his NASCAR career driving for Jefferson Pitts Racing and MDM Motorsports in 2018 before joining GMS, JRM, and Chevrolet as a development driver in 2019.

== Racing career ==
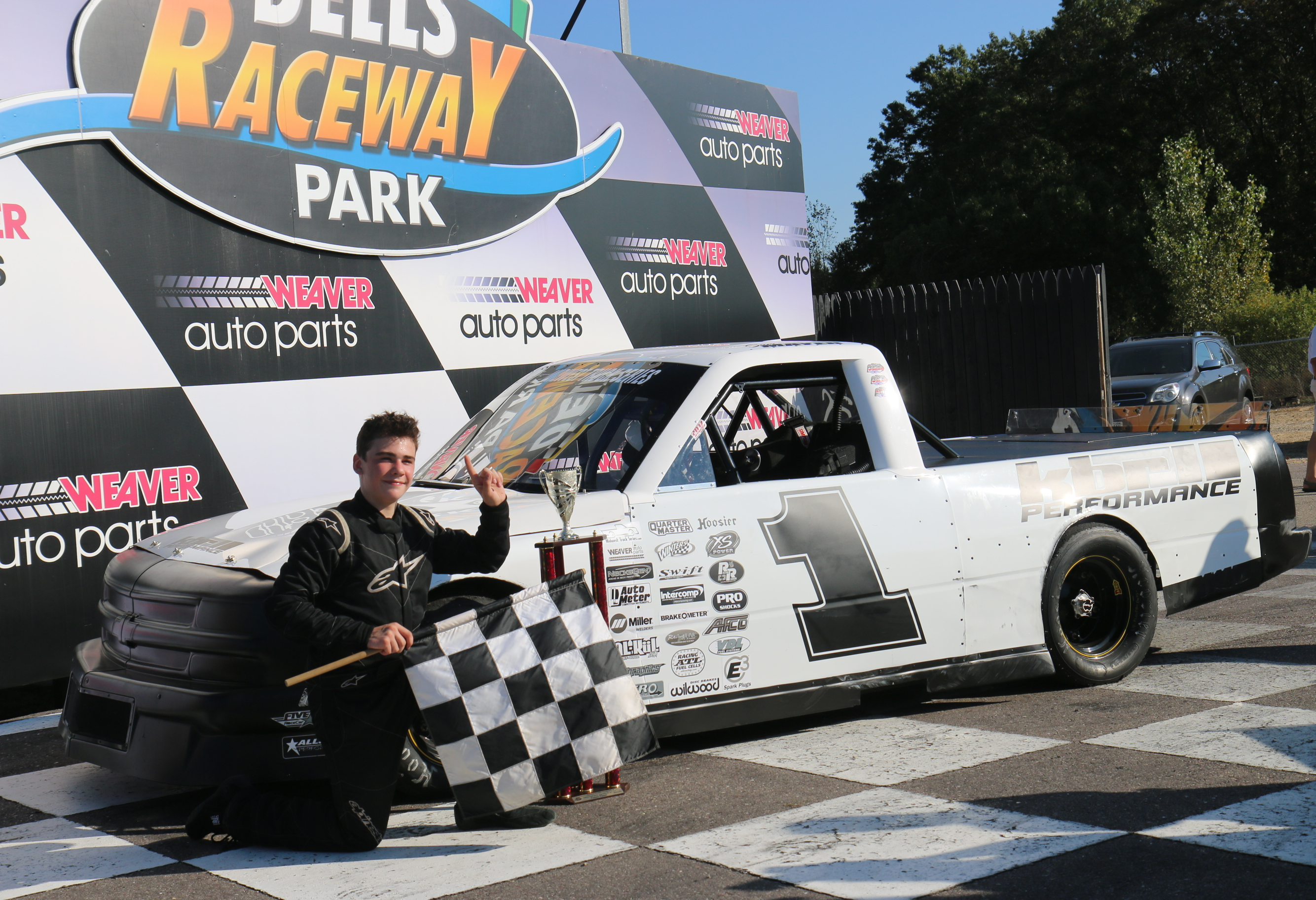
Mayer in victory lane at his first Midwest Truck Series start

=== Early career ===
Mayer got off to an early start in racing, competing in go-kart events at the age of four. Although his father, Scott Mayer, was an open-wheel racer, Sam chose in his preteen years to focus on stock car racing. Over the course of the 2017 summer, during which Mayer turned fourteen, he spent the summer in Charlotte to race Legends cars; he won the Young Lions division of the Charlotte Motor Speedway Summer Shootout. He also raced in a Limited Late Model and won at Greenville-Pickens Speedway to become the track's youngest winner. He came back to Wisconsin and won a September Midwest Truck Series race at Dells Raceway Park in his first series start.

In 2017, Mayer came in touch with industry veteran Lorin Ranier, who eventually landed Mayer a late model ride with JR Motorsports in the CARS Tour for 2018. Mayer's late model racing also brought him to the World Series of Asphalt, where he finished second to Stephen Nasse. After the CARS Tour season was over, Mayer was voted the series' Most Popular Driver for 2018. The CARS Tour season included one victory, at Wake County Speedway.

=== ARCA Menards Series ===
Ranier also led Mayer to MDM Motorsports for a limited slate in the ARCA Racing Series and NASCAR K&N Pro Series East in the back half of 2018, with age restrictions being a factor in which races Mayer could run, as both series only let fifteen year old competitors race on certain tracks. In his first ARCA race, Mayer ran as high as third and finished inside the top ten.

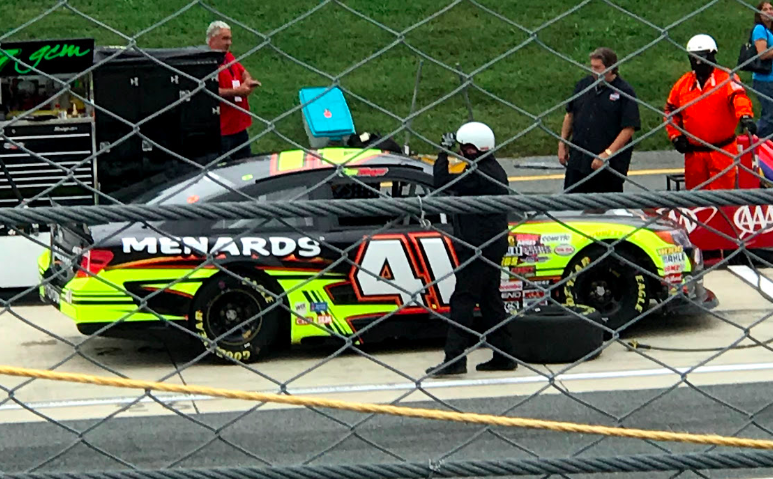
Mayer's K&N East car on pit road at Dover International Speedway in 2018

On December 5, 2018, it was announced that Mayer would run a full NASCAR K&N Pro Series East schedule with GMS Racing as part of a 2019 schedule that would also include seven ARCA races.

Mayer scored his first K&N East win at Bristol on April 6, 2019, leading every lap. He nearly scored his first ARCA Menards Series win at Gateway in June after a late pit gamble, but was moved up the track by Ty Gibbs in the final set of corners and was relegated to third. In October, he won the 2019 K&N East championship to become the youngest NASCAR champion at 16 years, 3 months, and 8 days; the previous record was 16 years and 5 months by Todd Gilliland in 2016. Mayer ended the 2019 season with four wins and top-ten finishes in all but one race.

Mayer raced in the ARCA Menards Series and ARCA Menards Series East in 2020. An injury at Road America forced Colin Braun to sub in for Mayer midway through the AMS race at the Daytona International Speedway road course. Mayer later won ARCA's first trip to Lebanon I-44 Speedway. Mayer also won at Bristol. He overcame a pit miscue to claim the checkered flag in the ARCA event. Mayer won the East finale at Five Flags Speedway to capture the series championship with an average finish of 1.2 on the season.

In 2021, Mayer would also drive select races in Bret Holmes Racing's No. 23 car in the ARCA Menards Series and ARCA Menards Series East.

In 2024, Mayer, driving for Sigma Performance Services, made a one-off start in the ARCA Menards Series West at Sonoma and took the lead from William Sawalich in the middle stages of the race, and led the final 37 laps to earn his second career West Series win.

=== NASCAR Gander Outdoors Truck Series ===
Mayer made his NASCAR Gander Outdoors Truck Series debut in 2019 with GMS Racing in four events; the four races came after Mayer turned sixteen. He made his debut at Bristol Motor Speedway, where he was placed in the 21st position, a DNF. That race would be followed by appearances at Martinsville Speedway and ISM Raceway. In 2020, Mayer made six starts, and he won at Bristol after winning the ARCA race hours before.

On January 14, 2021, defending ARCA champion Bret Holmes announced he would begin fielding a part-time Truck Series team, the No. 32, for himself and Mayer for the upcoming season. Three days later on January 17, it was also announced that Mayer would run seven races in the No. 75 for Henderson Motorsports in the Truck Series, beginning at the Daytona Road Course, which would end up being his only start with Henderson.

=== NASCAR O'Reilly Auto Parts Series ===
On September 15, 2020, Mayer and JR Motorsports announced an agreement to have him drive one of the organization's NASCAR Xfinity Series cars part-time in the latter portion of 2021 and full-time in the 2022 season.

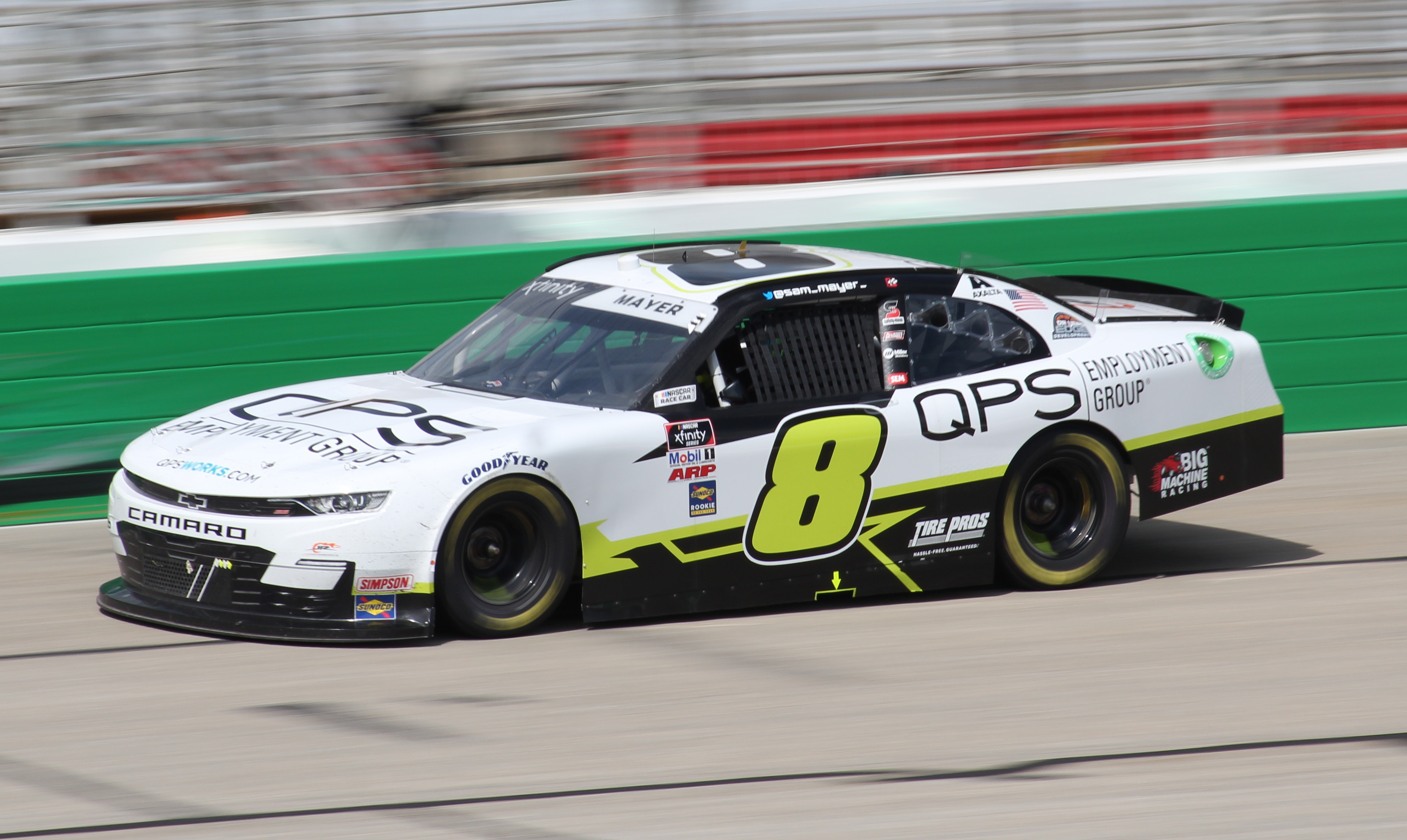
Mayer's Xfinity Series car at Atlanta Motor Speedway in 2021

On January 4, 2022, it was confirmed that Sam Mayer would drive the JR Motorsports No. 1 in 2022, replacing Michael Annett. At the Martinsville spring race on April 8, Mayer finished fifth after doing a bump-and-run on Ty Gibbs on the final lap. After the race, Gibbs attempted to spin Mayer out during the cool-down laps before both drivers engaged in a fistfight on pit road. Mayer would go on to finish seventh in the final points standings with a best result of second at Talladega.

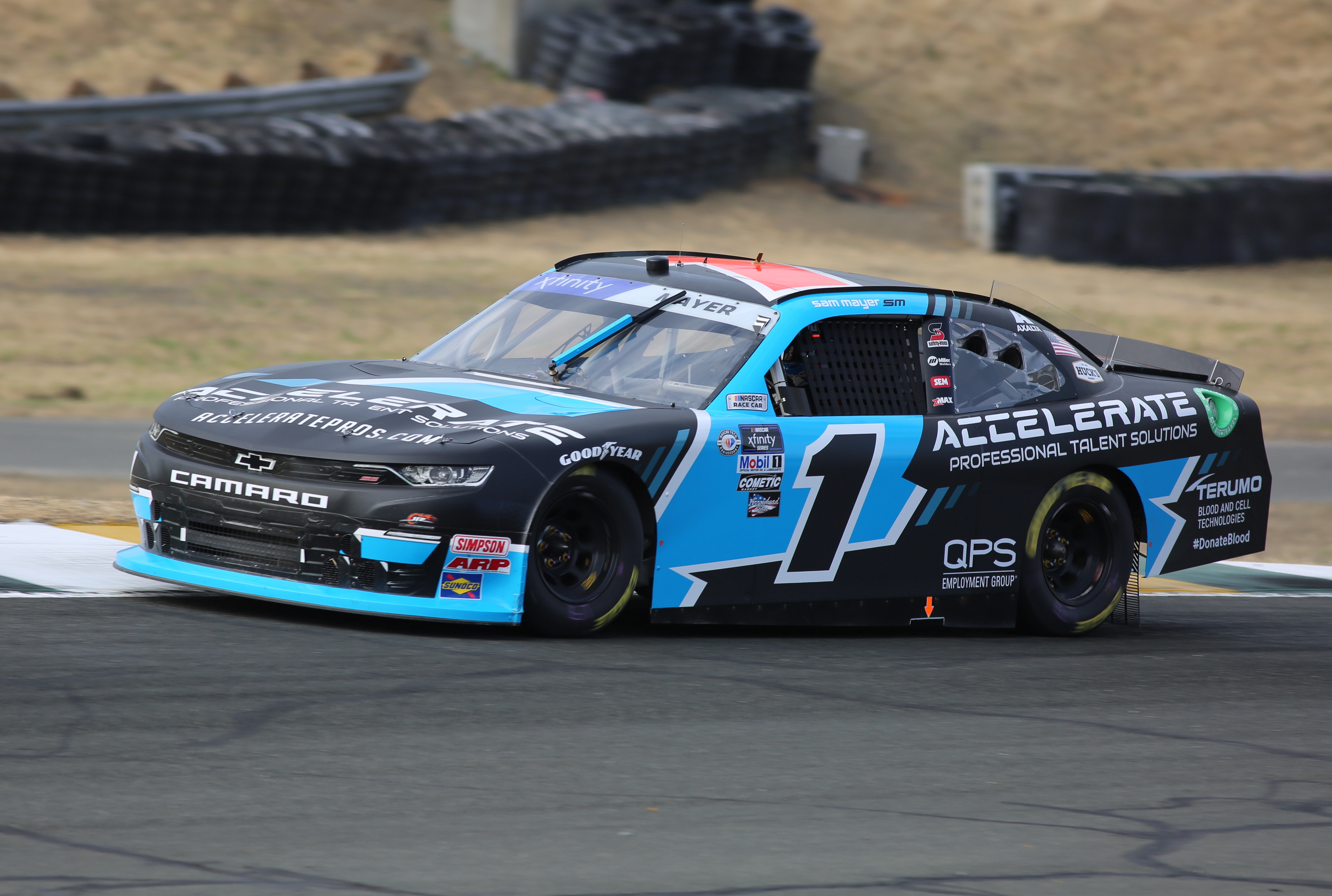
Mayer's Xfinity Series car at Sonoma Raceway in 2023

On August 9, 2022, it was announced that Mayer would return for the 2023 season. He started the 2023 season with a 27th-place finish at Daytona, where he flipped down the backstretch on the final lap. Mayer scored his first career win at Road America. He followed it up with his second win at Watkins Glen. During the playoffs, Mayer won at the Charlotte Roval and at Homestead to make the Championship 4. Mayer finished fifth at Phoenix and third in the points standings.

Mayer started the 2024 season with a 36th-place DNF at Daytona. At Texas, he scored a narrow victory over Ryan Sieg at Texas by 0.002 seconds, making it part of a three-way tie for the second closest finish in Xfinity Series history. Mayer scored his second win of the season at Iowa. During the playoffs, he was disqualified at Talladega after his car failed the post-race ride height requirement. A week later, Mayer won at the Charlotte Roval.

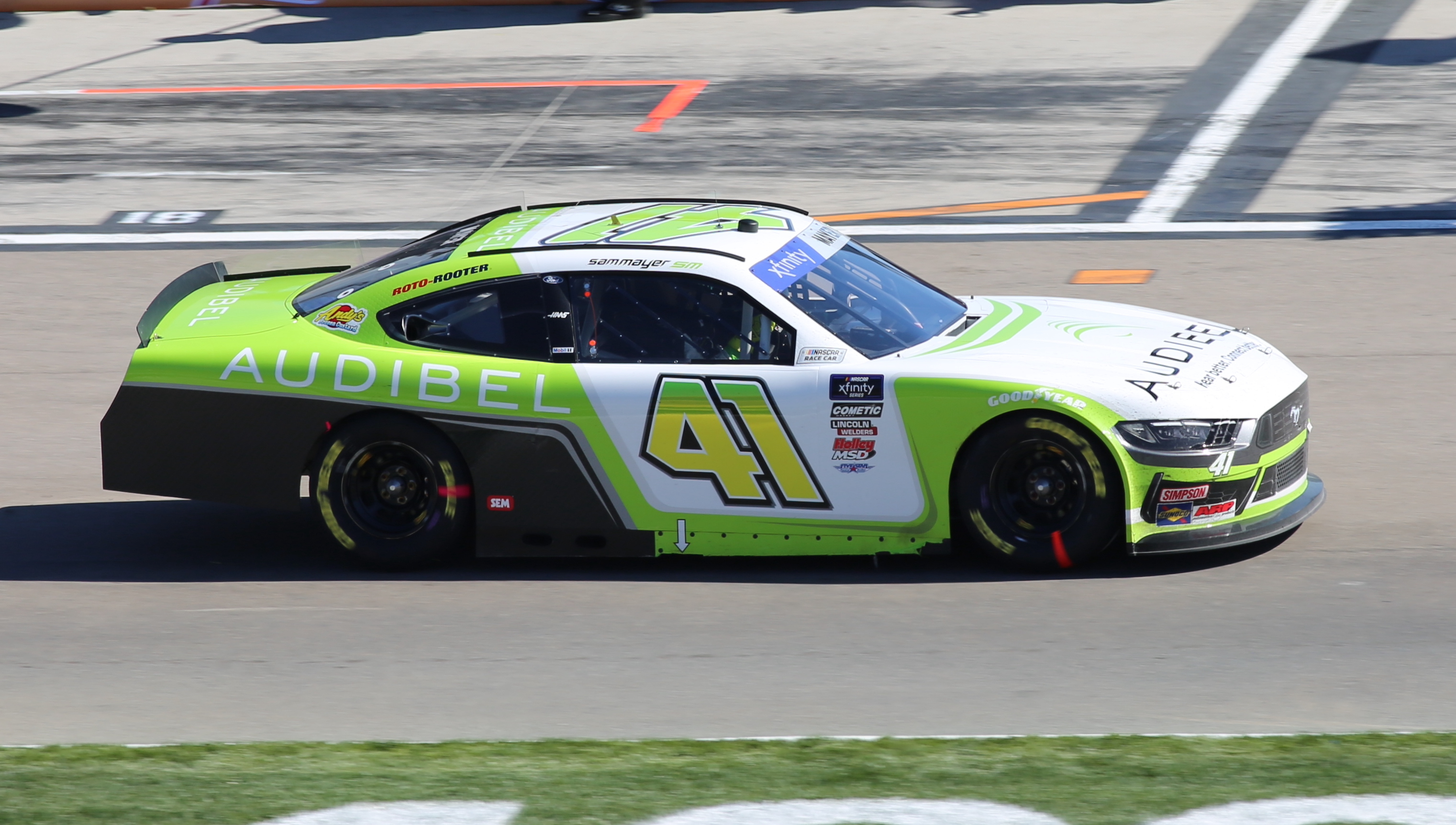
Mayer's No. 41 car at Las Vegas Motor Speedway in 2025

On August 17, 2024, Mayer signed with Haas Factory Team to drive the No. 41 Ford in 2025. Mayer started the season with a second-place finish at Daytona. After staying consistent throughout the year, he won at Iowa, earning Haas's first win in their career and the first win for Ford that year.

On October 28, 2025, NASCAR imposed a one-race suspension on Mayer for intentionally wrecking Jeb Burton during the post-race cooldown lap at Martinsville, with Ryan Sieg replacing him for the season finale at Phoenix.

Mayer's No. 41 car at Las Vegas Motor Speedway in 2026

Mayer started his 2026 season with a 31st-place DNF at Daytona. He won the pole at both Atlanta races and spring Las Vegas race.

On September 22, 2026, Mayer signed with JRM to return to the No. 1 Chevy in 2027.

=== Other racing ===
In 2020, Mayer made a TA2 Trans-Am start at Road America and suffered a hairline fracture in his wrist during a race-ending crash.

== Personal life ==
Mayer's father Scott Mayer, also a race driver, is the founder of QPS Employment Group and Accelerate Professional Talent Solutions, Mayer's primary sponsor in the Xfinity Series. As of 2023, the company has 57 branches across eight states and employs thousands of associate employees, making it one of the largest employment firms in the Midwest.

== Motorsports career results ==
=== Racing career summary ===
Season	Series	Team	Races	Wins	Top 5	Top 10	Points	Position
2018	CARS Late Model Stock Car Tour	JR Motorsports	12	1	3	9	297	5th
2018	NASCAR K&N Pro Series West	Jefferson Pitts Racing	1	0	0	0	27	52nd
2018	NASCAR K&N Pro Series East	Jefferson Pitts Racing	2	0	0	0	200	18th
2018	NASCAR K&N Pro Series East	MDM Motorsports	4	0	2	3	200	18th
2018	ARCA Racing Series	MDM Motorsports	2	0	0	2	400	52nd
2019	NASCAR K&N Pro Series West	GMS Racing	1	0	1	1	42	37th
2019	NASCAR K&N Pro Series East	GMS Racing	12	4	11	11	511	**1st**
2019	ARCA Menards Series	GMS Racing	8	0	7	7	1650	14th
2019	NASCAR Gander Outdoors Truck Series	GMS Racing	3	0	0	0	54	50th
2020	ARCA Menards Series West	GMS Racing	2	1	1	1	122	16th
2020	ARCA Menards Series East	GMS Racing	6	5	6	6	382	**1st**
2020	ARCA Menards Series	GMS Racing	13	5	12	12	553	7th
2020	NASCAR Gander Outdoors Truck Series	GMS Racing	6	1	2	2	179	27th
2021	ARCA Menards Series East	Bret Holmes Racing	2	0	1	1	57	29th
2021	ARCA Menards Series	Bret Holmes Racing	5	0	2	2	149	27th
2021	NASCAR Camping World Truck Series	Bret Holmes Racing	4	0	0	3	0	NC†
2021	NASCAR Camping World Truck Series	Henderson Motorsports	1	0	0	0	0	NC†
2021	NASCAR Xfinity Series	JR Motorsports	17	0	1	6	338	25th
2021	NASCAR Xfinity Series	B. J. McLeod Motorsports	1	0	0	0	338	25th
2022	NASCAR Xfinity Series	JR Motorsports	33	0	11	19	2231	7th
2023	NASCAR Xfinity Series	JR Motorsports	33	4	13	19	4032	**3rd**
2024	ARCA Menards Series West	Sigma Performance Services	1	1	1	1	48	36th
2024	NASCAR Xfinity Series	JR Motorsports	33	3	8	13	2205	9th
2025	NASCAR Xfinity Series	Haas Factory Team	32	1	13	17	2204	10th
2026	NASCAR O'Reilly Auto Parts Series	Haas Factory Team					TBD	TBD
2027	NASCAR O'Reilly Auto Parts Series	JR Motorsports					TBD	TBD

^{†} As Mayer was a guest driver, he was ineligible for championship points.

=== NASCAR ===
(key) (Bold – Pole position awarded by qualifying time. Italics – Pole position earned by points standings or practice time. * – Most laps led. ** – All laps led.)

==== O'Reilly Auto Parts Series ====
NASCAR O'Reilly Auto Parts Series results
Year	Team	No.	Make	1	2	3	4	5	6	7	8	9	10	11	12	13	14	15	16	17	18	19	20	21	22	23	24	25	26	27	28	29	30	31	32	33	NOAPSC	Pts	Ref
2021	JR Motorsports	8	Chevy	DAY	DRC	HOM	LVS	PHO	ATL	MAR	TAL	DAR	DOV	COA	CLT	MOH	TEX	NSH	POC; 18	ROA; 35	ATL; 9	NHA; 39	GLN; 10	IRC; 27	MCH; 33	DAY; 12	DAR; 39		BRI; 9	LVS; 34	TAL; 38	ROV; 10	TEX; 13	KAN; 8	MAR; 4	PHO; 13	25th	338	
2021	B. J. McLeod Motorsports	99	Chevy																									RCH; 12									25th	338	
2022	JR Motorsports	1	Chevy	DAY; 30	CAL; 6	LVS; 25	PHO; 22	ATL; 21	COA; 5	RCH; 3	MAR; 5	TAL; 28	DOV; 5	DAR; 5	TEX; 3	**CLT**; 3	PIR; 38	NSH; 5	ROA; 20	ATL; 34	NHA; 15	POC; 6	IRC; 7	MCH; 33	GLN; 6	DAY; 34	DAR; 11	KAN; 9	BRI; 4	TEX; 8	TAL; 2	ROV; 11	LVS; 7	HOM; 5	MAR; 6	PHO; 34	7th	2231	
2023	JR Motorsports	1	Chevy	DAY; 27	CAL; 2	LVS; 7	PHO; 11	ATL; 9	COA; 7	RCH; 17	MAR; 31	TAL; 29	DOV; 9	DAR; 8	CLT; 35	PIR; 3	SON; 10	NSH; 3	CSC; 18	ATL; 5	NHA; 18	POC; 2	ROA; 1	MCH; 5	IRC; 2	GLN; 1	DAY; 19	DAR; 11	KAN; 37	BRI; 35	TEX; 38	**ROV**; 1*	LVS; 5	HOM; 1	MAR; 25	PHO; 5	3rd	4032	
2024	JR Motorsports	1	Chevy	DAY; 36	ATL; 11	LVS; 38	PHO; 34	COA; 9	RCH; 30	MAR; 2	TEX; 1	TAL; 36	DOV; 3	DAR; 4	CLT; 4*	**PIR**; 28	SON; 3	IOW; 1	NHA; 19	NSH; 10	CSC; 19	POC; 10	IND; 37	MCH; 37	DAY; 13	DAR; 28	ATL; 36	GLN; 20	BRI; 9	KAN; 13	TAL; 38	ROV; 1	LVS; 14	HOM; 9	MAR; 30	PHO; 11	9th	2205	
2025	Haas Factory Team	41	Ford	DAY; 2	ATL; 36	COA; 3	PHO; 7	LVS; 5	HOM; 2	MAR; 5	DAR; 14	BRI; 11	CAR; 26	TAL; 14	TEX; 5	CLT; 11	NSH; 3	MXC; 23	POC; 7	ATL; 3	CSC; 8	SON; 17	DOV; 12	**IND**; 2	IOW; 1	GLN; 2	DAY; 5	PIR; 16	GTW; 35	BRI; 3	KAN; 16	ROV; 19	LVS; 9	TAL; 38	MAR; 7	PHO	10th	2204	
2026	Haas Factory Team	41	Chevy	DAY; 31	**ATL**; 7	COA; 14	PHO; 5	**LVS**; 35	DAR; 10	MAR; 23	CAR; 38	BRI; 20	KAN; 9	TAL; 24	TEX; 3	GLN; 13	DOV; 3	CLT; 36	NSH; 4	POC; 4	COR; 34	SON; 8	CHI; 8	**ATL**; 31	IND; 13	IOW; 21	DAY; 25	DAR; 8	GTW; 3	BRI; 7	LVS; 6	CLT; 24	PHO; 2	TAL; 13	MAR; 5	HOM; 9	6th	2387	

==== Camping World Truck Series ====
NASCAR Camping World Truck Series results
Year	Team	No.	Make	1	2	3	4	5	6	7	8	9	10	11	12	13	14	15	16	17	18	19	20	21	22	23	NCWTC	Pts	Ref
2019	GMS Racing	21	Chevy	DAY	ATL	LVS	MAR	TEX	DOV	KAN	CLT	TEX	IOW	GTW	CHI	KEN	POC	ELD	MCH	BRI; 21	MSP	LVS	TAL	MAR; 28	PHO; 19	HOM	50th	54	
2020	GMS Racing	24	Chevy	DAY	LVS	CLT	ATL	HOM	POC	KEN	TEX	KAN	KAN	MCH	DRC	DOV; 15	GTW; 4	DAR	RCH; 19	BRI; 1	LVS	TAL	KAN	TEX	MAR; 18	PHO; 17	27th	179	
2021	Henderson Motorsports	75	Chevy	DAY	DRC; 37	LVS	ATL	BRD																			100th	0^{1}	
2021	Bret Holmes Racing	32	Chevy						RCH; 9	KAN	DAR	COA; 6	CLT	TEX	NSH	POC	KNX	GLN; 9	GTW	DAR	BRI; 22	LVS	TAL	MAR	PHO		100th	0^{1}	

^{*} Season still in progress
^{1} Ineligible for series points

=== ARCA Menards Series ===
(key) (Bold – Pole position awarded by qualifying time. Italics – Pole position earned by points standings or practice time. * – Most laps led.)

ARCA Menards Series results
Year	Team	No.	Make	1	2	3	4	5	6	7	8	9	10	11	12	13	14	15	16	17	18	19	20	AMSC	Pts	Ref
2018	MDM Motorsports	40	Toyota	DAY	NSH	SLM	TAL	TOL	CLT	POC	MCH	MAD	GTW	CHI	IOW; 10	ELK	POC	ISF	BLN	DSF	SLM	IRP; 7	KAN	52nd	400	
2019	GMS Racing	21	Chevy	DAY	FIF; 15	SLM; 2	TAL	NSH	TOL; 5	CLT	POC	MCH	MAD; 3	GTW; 3	CHI	ELK; 3	IOW	POC	ISF	DSF	SLM; 5	IRP; 3	KAN	14th	1650	
2020	GMS Racing	21	Chevy	DAY	PHO; 20	TAL	POC; 3	IRP; 2	KEN; 4	IOW; 2	KAN	TOL; 1	TOL; 1	MCH	DRC; 3	GTW; 3	L44; 1	**TOL**; 1*	BRI; 1*	WIN	MEM; 2	ISF	KAN	7th	553	
2021	Bret Holmes Racing	23	Chevy	DAY	PHO	TAL	KAN	TOL	CLT	MOH	POC; 22	ELK	BLN	IOW	WIN	GLN; 14	MCH; 4	ISF	MLW; 2	DSF	BRI; 29	SLM	KAN	27th	149	

==== ARCA Menards Series East ====
ARCA Menards Series East results
Year	Team	No.	Make	1	2	3	4	5	6	7	8	9	10	11	12	13	14	AMSEC	Pts	Ref
2018	Jefferson Pitts Racing	27	Ford	NSM	BRI	LGY	SBO	SBO	MEM	NJM	THO	NHA; 17	IOW; 17					18th	200	
2018	MDM Motorsports	41	Toyota											GLN; 5			DOV; 4	18th	200	
2018	MDM Motorsports	12	Toyota												GTW; 11	NHA; 10		18th	200	
2019	GMS Racing	21	Chevy	NSM; 4	**BRI**; 1**	SBO; 2	SBO; 11	MEM; 4	NHA; 2	**IOW**; 1*	GLN; 3	BRI; 1	GTW; 4	NHA; 5	**DOV**; 1*			1st	511	
2020	GMS Racing	21	Chevy	NSM; 1	**TOL**; 2	DOV; 1	**TOL**; 1*	BRI; 1*	FIF; 1									1st	382	
2021	Bret Holmes Racing	23	Chevy	NSM	FIF	NSV	DOV	SNM	IOW	MLW; 2	BRI; 29							29th	57	

==== ARCA Menards Series West ====
ARCA Menards Series West results
Year	Team	No.	Make	1	2	3	4	5	6	7	8	9	10	11	12	13	14	AMSWC	Pts	Ref
2018	Jefferson Pitts Racing	27	Ford	KCR	TUS	TUS	OSS	CNS	SON	DCS	IOW; 17	EVG	GTW	LVS	MER	AAS	KCR	52nd	27	
2019	GMS Racing	21	Chevy	LVS	IRW	TUS	TUS	CNS	SON	DCS	IOW	EVG	GTW	MER	AAS	KCR	**PHO**; 2*	37th	42	
2020	GMS Racing	21	Chevy	**LVS**; 1*	MMP	MMP	IRW	EVG	DCS	CNS	LVS	AAS	KCR	PHO; 21				16th	122	
2024	Sigma Performance Services	23	Chevy	PHO	KER	PIR	**SON**; 1*	IRW	IRW	SHA	TRI	MAD	AAS	KER	PHO			36th	48	

=== CARS Late Model Stock Car Tour ===
(key) (Bold – Pole position awarded by qualifying time. Italics – Pole position earned by points standings or practice time. * – Most laps led. ** – All laps led.)

CARS Late Model Stock Car Tour results
Year	Team	No.	Make	1	2	3	4	5	6	7	8	9	10	11	12	CLMSCTC	Pts	Ref
2018	JR Motorsports	9M	Chevy	TCM; 3	MYB; 15	ROU; 7										5th	297	
2018	JR Motorsports	9	Chevy				HCY; 7	BRI; 9	ACE; 20	CCS; 14	KPT; 4		WKS; 1	ROU; 6	SBO; 8	5th	297	
2018	JR Motorsports	28	Chevy									HCY; 7				5th	297	

Sporting positions
Preceded by Tyler Ankrum	K&N Pro Series East Champion; 2019–2020	Succeeded by Ty Gibbs
