= Parker Retzlaff =

American racing driver (born 2003)

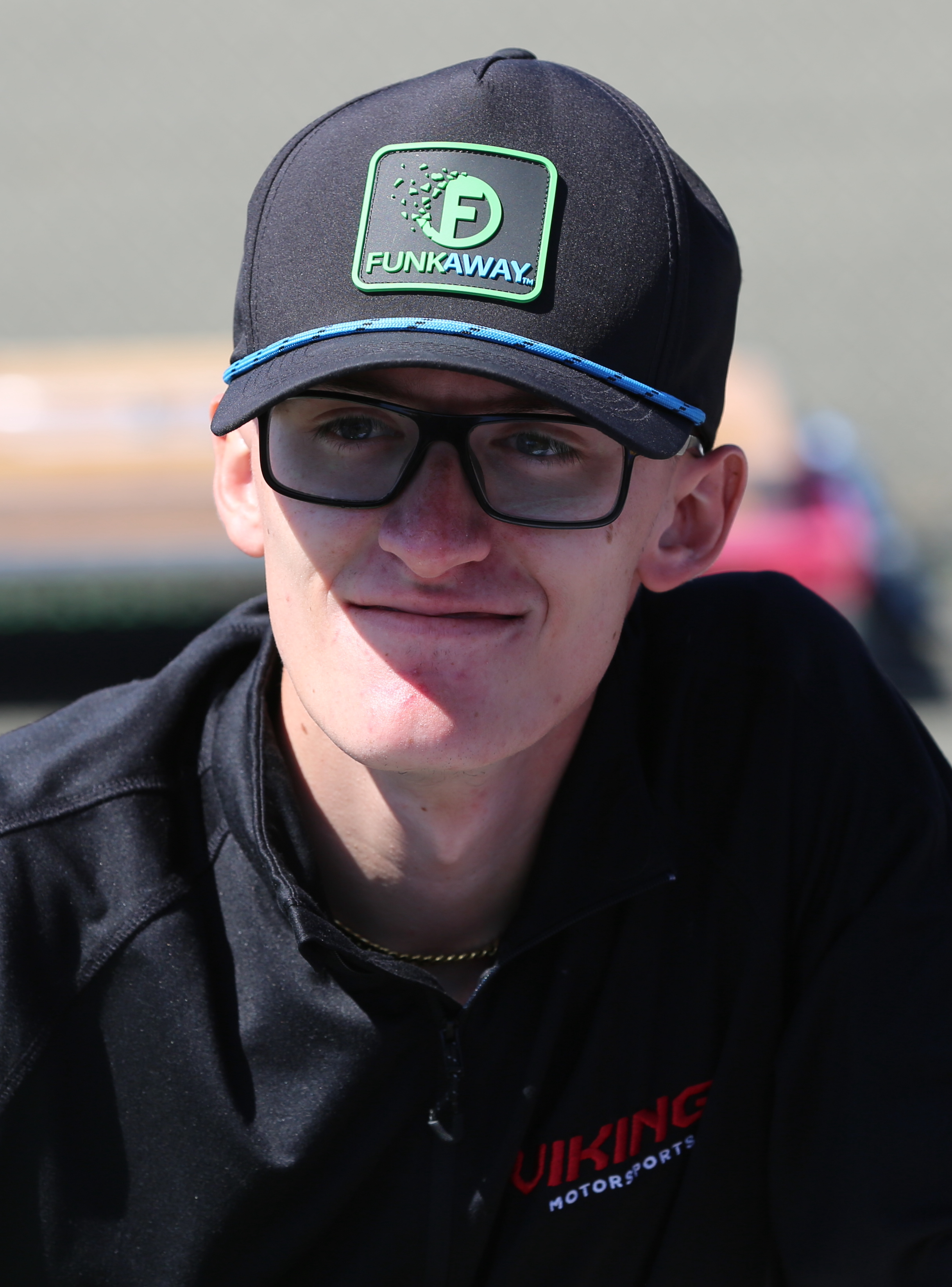
- Retzlaff at Sonoma Raceway in 2026
- Born: Parker Edward Retzlaff; May 21, 2003 (age 23); Rhinelander, Wisconsin, U.S.
- Height: 5 ft 11 in (1.80 m)
- Weight: 130 lb (59 kg)

NASCAR Cup Series career
- 2 races run over 1 year
- 2024 position: 48th
- Best finish: 48th (2024)
- First race: 2024 Cook Out 400 (Richmond)
- Last race: 2024 Coke Zero Sugar 400 (Daytona)
Wins	Top tens	Poles
0	1	0

NASCAR O'Reilly Auto Parts Series career
- 140 races run over 5 years
- Car no., team: No. 99 (Viking Motorsports)
- 2026 position: 11th
- Best finish: 11th (2026)
- First race: 2022 United Rentals 200 (Phoenix)
- Last race: 2026 O'Reilly Auto Parts 300 (Homestead)
Wins	Top tens	Poles
0	27	2

NASCAR FedEx Freight Truck Series career
- 2 races run over 2 years
- Truck no., team: No. 62 (Halmar Friesen Racing)
- 2026 position: 110th
- Best finish: 98th (2022)
- First race: 2022 Chevrolet Silverado 250 (Talladega)
- Last race: 2026 Allegiance 200 (Nashville)
Wins	Top tens	Poles
0	0	0

ARCA Menards Series career
- 4 races run over 3 years
- Best finish: 44th (2020)
- First race: 2020 Royal Truck & Trailer 200 (Toledo)
- Last race: 2023 General Tire 100 at The Glen (Watkins Glen)
Wins	Top tens	Poles
0	1	0

ARCA Menards Series East career
- 14 races run over 3 years
- Best finish: 4th (2020)
- First race: 2019 Monaco Cocktails Gateway Classic 125 (Gateway)
- Last race: 2021 Sprecher 150 (Milwaukee)
Wins	Top tens	Poles
0	11	0

ARCA Menards Series West career
- 3 races run over 2 years
- Best finish: 30th (2023)
- First race: 2019 Monaco Cocktails Gateway Classic 125 (Gateway)
- Last race: 2023 General Tire 200 (Sonoma)
Wins	Top tens	Poles
0	2	0
- Statistics up to date as of November 7, 2026.

Parker Edward Retzlaff (/raɪtzˈlɒf/; born May 21, 2003) is an American professional stock car racing driver. He competes full-time in the NASCAR O'Reilly Auto Parts Series, driving the No. 99 Chevrolet Camaro SS for Viking Motorsports and part-time in the NASCAR Craftsman Truck Series, driving the No. 62 Toyota Tundra TRD Pro for Halmar Friesen Racing.

== Racing career ==
=== Early career ===
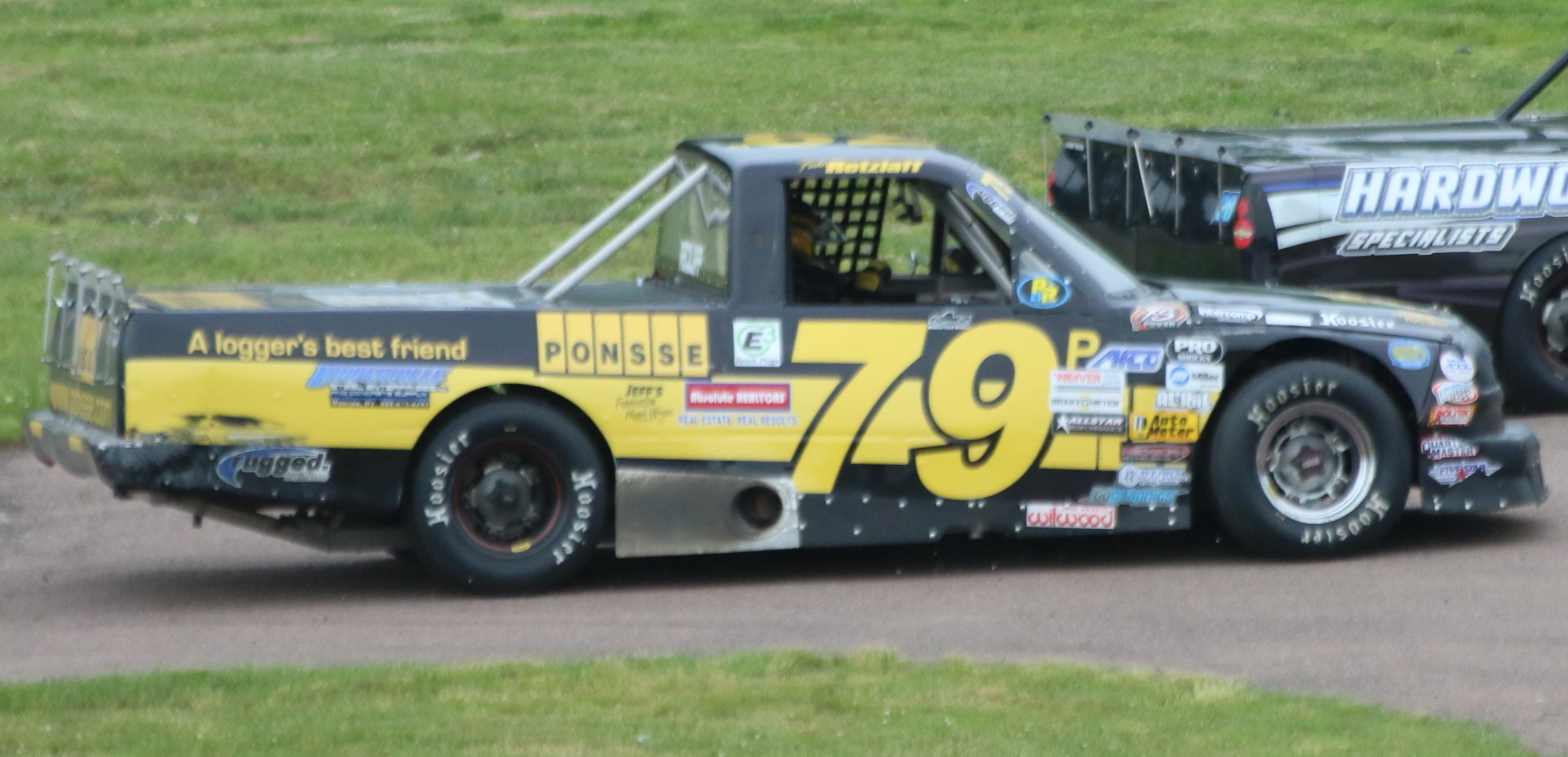
2018 Midwest Truck

In 2012, at nine years old, Retzlaff competed in the Wisconsin Junior Sprints, where he won the mid-season championship. He competed in the Wisconsin Bandolero Series in 2013, finishing third in points, and winning the championship a year later. He would rank second in state points from 2015 to 2016.

Retzlaff ran full-time in the ARCA Midwest Tour in 2017, where he ranked fourteenth in points and ranked second in the Midwest Truck Series asphalt trucks. And for 2018, he finished sixth in the overall standings of the Midwest Truck Series.

=== ARCA ===
Retzlaff would sign with Visconti Motorsports for two races in the 2019 NASCAR K&N Pro Series East (now ARCA Menards Series East), driving the No. 74. He would finish tenth at Memphis International Raceway, for his first ever top-ten, and would finish fifth at Gateway Motorsports Park, scoring his first ever top-five. Retzlaff made his 2019 NASCAR K&N Pro Series West debut, running the race's paired event with the NASCAR K&N Pro Series East, at Gateway Motorsports Park. He finished in fifth.

In 2020, Retzlaff would sign with Cook-Finley Racing full-time, driving in the No. 42. He earned five top-tens and one top-twenty, finishing fourth in the standings.

Retzlaff would return to Cook-Finley Racing in 2021 but only ran for a partial schedule. He would finish fourth at the Southern National Motorsports Park, making it his best career ARCA Menards Series East finish. Retzlaff made his ARCA Menards Series debut in 2020 for CFR, driving in paired events with the East series. His best finish of the season was eighth at Toledo Speedway. He returned in 2021, driving in the paired East series race at the Milwaukee Mile. He would finish eleventh.

In 2023, Retzlaff returned to ARCA competition and drove for Young's Motorsports in the road course races at Portland and Sonoma.

=== NASCAR O'Reilly Auto Parts Series ===
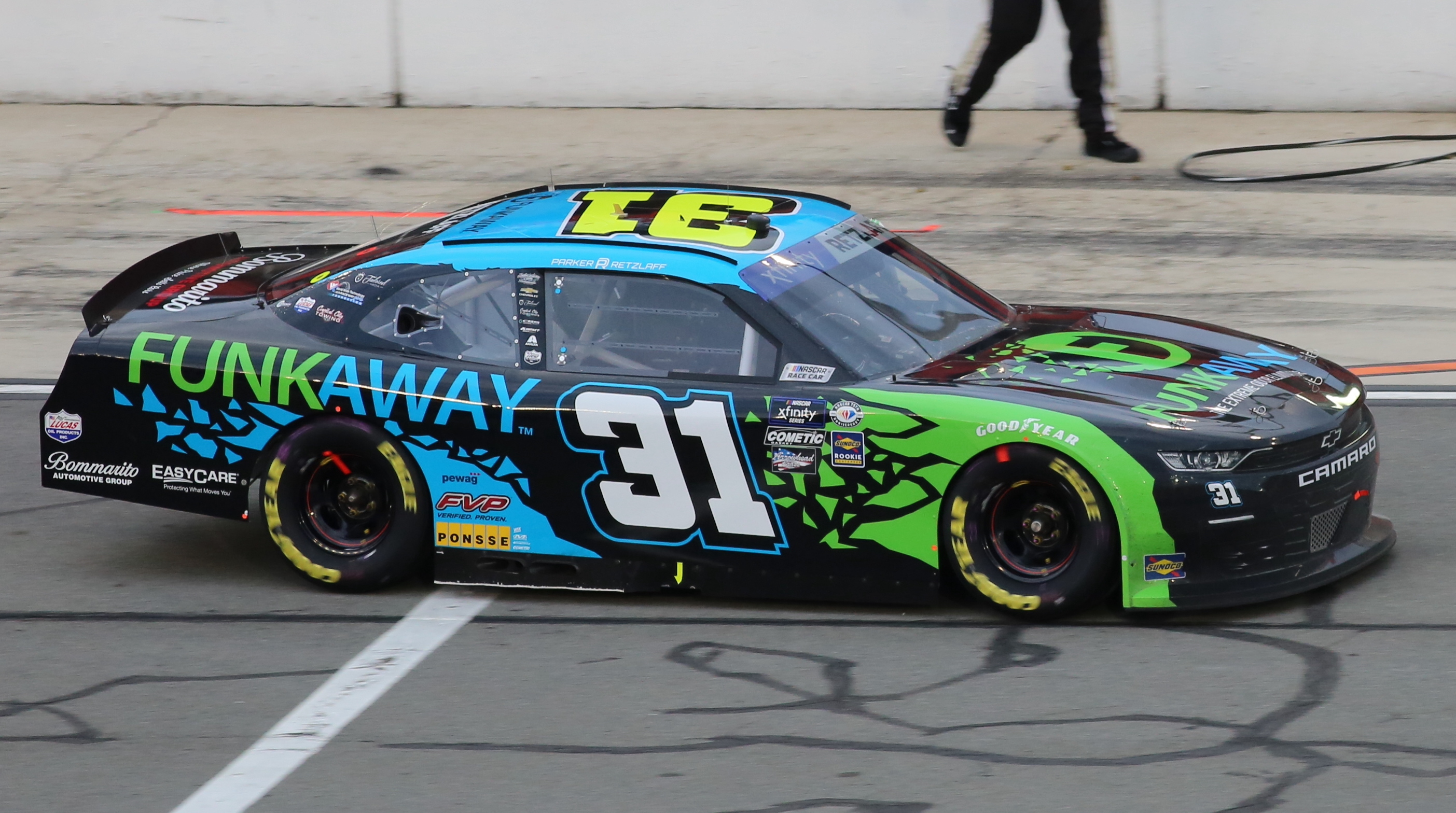
Retzlaff at Auto Club Speedway in 2023

==== 2022 ====
On December 3, 2021, Retzlaff would sign with RSS Racing for a part-time effort in the 2022 NASCAR Xfinity Series, driving the No. 38. He hopes to have a full-time program in 2023. At the 2022 United Rentals 200, his first start, Retzlaff would qualify an impressive sixth. He quickly fell back after the first restart. A fuel pump issue would end Retzlaff's race on lap 158, finishing 36th. He would score his best career finish at the 2022 ToyotaCare 250, after starting and finishing the race in tenth. On September 15, 2022, it was revealed that Retzlaff and RSS Racing had mutually parted ways. On September 20, it was announced that Retzlaff would drive the No. 02 for Our Motorsports at the Texas fall race.

==== 2023 ====
On January 4, 2023, Jordan Anderson Racing announced that Retzlaff will drive their No. 31 car full-time for the 2023 season. In the season-opener race at Daytona, Retzlaff earned a career-best fourth-place finish. Overall, Retzlaff scored no wins, one top-five, and seven top-tens with an average finish of 17.9 and finished sixteenth in the standings.

==== 2024 ====
On November 2, 2023, it was announced that Retzlaff will return to JAR for the 2024 season. Retzlaff scored his and JAR's first career poles at Richmond and at Martinsville, although he would finish 21st in the points standings with only four top-ten finishes.

On November 14, 2024, Retzlaff announced that he would not return to JAR.

==== 2025: New career best NXS finish ====
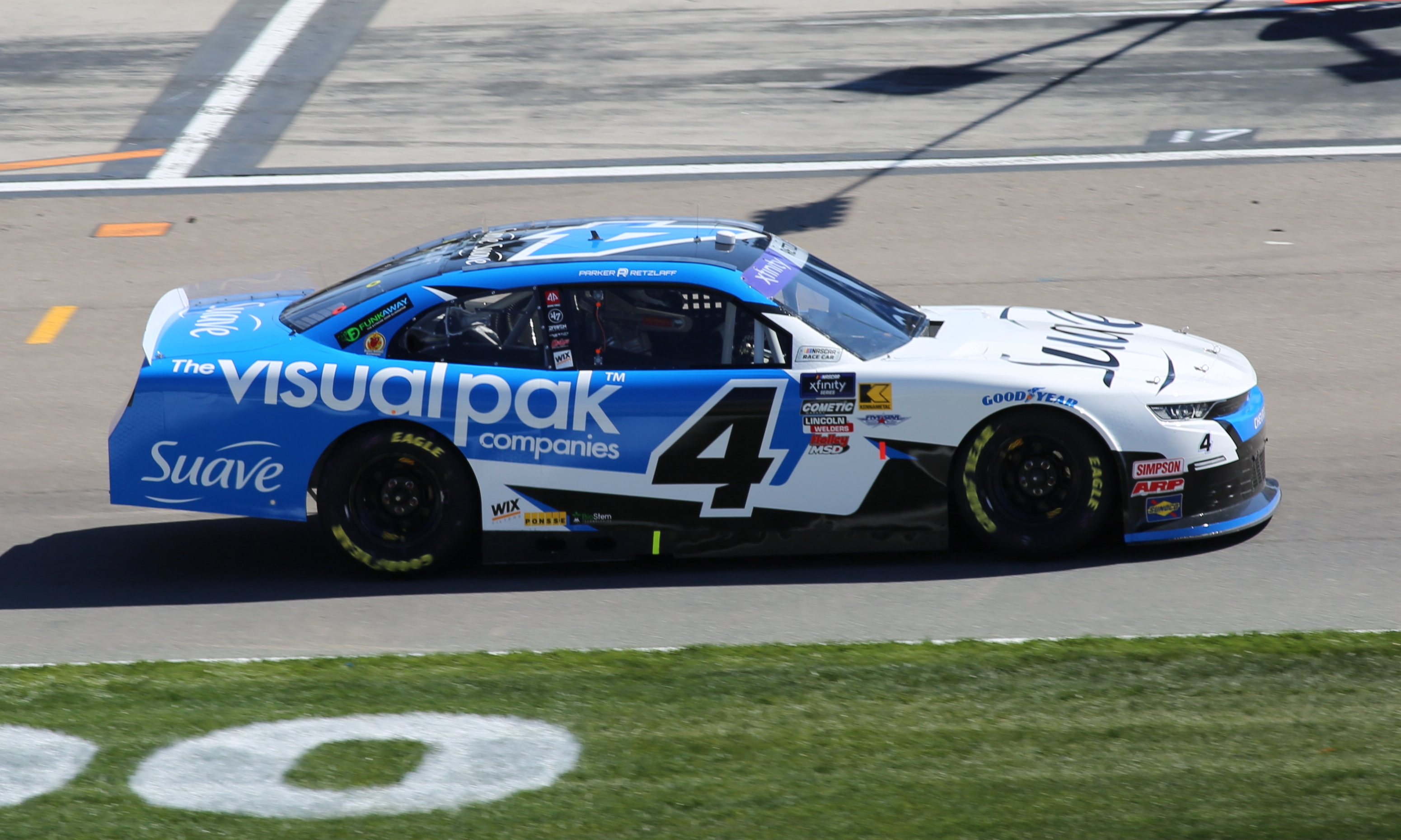
Retzlaff's No. 4 car at Las Vegas Motor Speedway in 2025

On December 18, 2024, it was announced that Retzlaff would move to Alpha Prime Racing, competing in the No. 4 Chevrolet. On April 19, Retzlaff drove his No. 4 car to a third place finish at Rockingham, which tied his best finish from last season's opening race at Daytona, but hours later, race winner Jesse Love got disqualified in post race inspection, bringing his finish up to second place, which is a new career best finish for Retzlaff.

On November 3, 2025, it was revealed that Retzlaff would not return to APR for the 2026 season.

==== 2026: Breakout ====
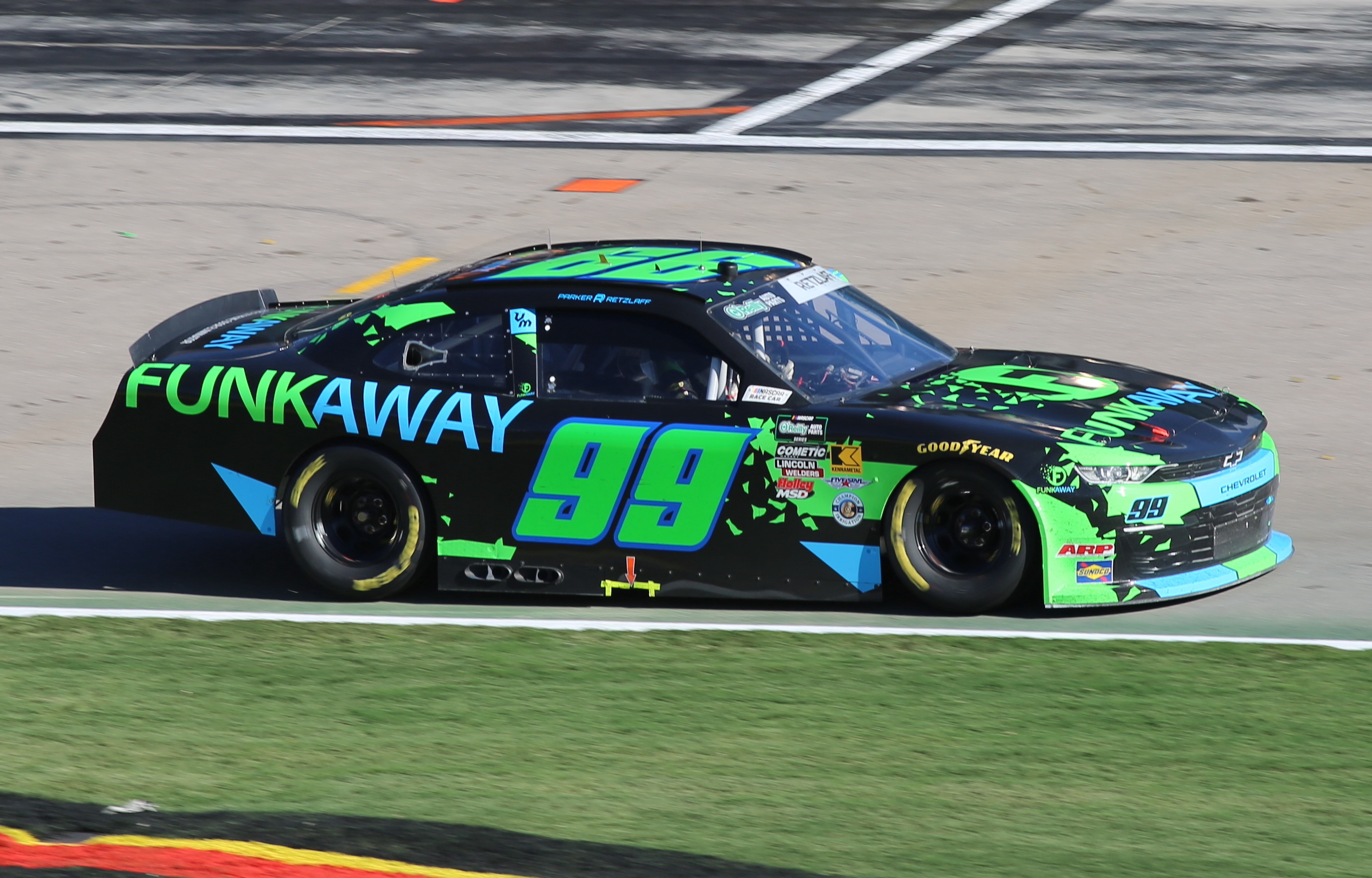
Retzlaff's No. 99 car at Las Vegas Motor Speedway in 2026

On November 7, 2025, it was announced that Retzlaff will join Viking Motorsports for the 2026 season, driving the No. 99 Chevrolet. After years of inconsistency, Retzlaff would have the best season of his career. During the 24-race regular season, Retzlaff recorded four Top 5s and ten Top 10s. This consistency earned him his first Chase appearance. Retzlaff would end the season a career-best 11th in the point standings, recording five Top 5s and 13 Top 10s.

=== NASCAR Craftsman Truck Series ===
On September 26, 2022, it was revealed that Retzlaff would make his NASCAR Camping World Truck Series debut at Talladega Superspeedway, driving the No. 20 for Young's Motorsports.

=== NASCAR Cup Series ===
On May 30, 2024, it was originally announced that Retzlaff would make his NASCAR Cup Series debut at Daytona International Speedway in August, driving the No. 62 Chevrolet for Beard Motorsports. However, on August 5, 2024, it was announced that Retzlaff would drive the No. 66 for MBM Motorsports during the Cook Out 400 at Richmond Raceway, as he was required to make a non-superspeedway start before Daytona. Retzlaff started 37th and finished 35th, six laps down. At the 2024 Coke Zero Sugar 400, Retzlaff scored an impressive seventh-place finish after pushing Harrison Burton to the lead under an overtime finish.

== Personal life ==
Retzlaff currently resides in his hometown of Rhinelander, Wisconsin. He is a fan of NASCAR Cup Series driver Kyle Larson, and enjoys playing basketball, working on race cars, and occasionally racing on his iRacing sim during his free time.

== Motorsports career results ==
=== Stock car career summary ===
Season	Series	Team	Races	Wins	Top 5	Top 10	Points	Position
2019	NASCAR K&N Pro Series West	Visconti Motorsports	1	0	1	1	0	NC†
2019	NASCAR K&N Pro Series East	Visconti Motorsports	2	0	1	2	73	24th
2020	ARCA Menards Series	Cook-Finley Racing	2	0	0	1	61	44th
2020	ARCA Menards Series East	Cook-Finley Racing	6	0	0	5	305	4th
2021	ARCA Menards Series	Cook-Finley Racing	1	0	0	0	33	92nd
2021	ARCA Menards Series East	Cook-Finley Racing	6	0	1	4	266	7th
2022	NASCAR Xfinity Series	RSS Racing	5	0	0	1	172	33rd
2022	NASCAR Xfinity Series	Our Motorsports	4	0	0	0	172	33rd
2022	NASCAR Camping World Truck Series	Young's Motorsports	1	0	0	0	0	NC†
2023	NASCAR Xfinity Series	Jordan Anderson Racing	33	0	1	7	662	16th
2024	NASCAR Cup Series	Beard Motorsports	1	0	0	1	0	NC†
2024	NASCAR Cup Series	MBM Motorsports	1	0	0	0	0	NC†
2024	NASCAR Xfinity Series	Jordan Anderson Racing	33	0	2	4	468	21st
2025	NASCAR Xfinity Series	Alpha Prime Racing	32	0	1	3	479	22nd

^{†} As Retzlaff was a guest driver, he was ineligible for championship points.

=== NASCAR ===
(key) (Bold – Pole position awarded by qualifying time. Italics – Pole position earned by points standings or practice time. * – Most laps led.)

==== Cup Series ====
NASCAR Cup Series results
Year	Team	No.	Make	1	2	3	4	5	6	7	8	9	10	11	12	13	14	15	16	17	18	19	20	21	22	23	24	25	26	27	28	29	30	31	32	33	34	35	36	NCSC	Pts	Ref
2024	MBM Motorsports	66	Ford	DAY	ATL	LVS	PHO	BRI	COA	RCH	MAR	TEX	TAL	DOV	KAN	DAR	CLT	GTW	SON	IOW	NHA	NSH	CSC	POC	IND	RCH; 35	MCH													48th	0^{1}	
2024	Beard Motorsports	62	Chevy																									DAY; 7	DAR	ATL	GLN	BRI	KAN	TAL	ROV	LVS	HOM	MAR	PHO	48th	0^{1}	

==== O'Reilly Auto Parts Series ====
NASCAR O'Reilly Auto Parts Series results
Year	Driver	No.	Make	1	2	3	4	5	6	7	8	9	10	11	12	13	14	15	16	17	18	19	20	21	22	23	24	25	26	27	28	29	30	31	32	33	NOAPSC	Pts	Ref
2022	RSS Racing	38	Ford	DAY	CAL	LVS	PHO; 36	ATL	COA	RCH; 10	MAR; 12	TAL	DOV; 17	DAR	TEX	CLT	PIR																				33rd	172	
2022	RSS Racing	28	Ford															NSH; 12	ROA	ATL	NHA	POC	IRC	MCH	GLN	DAY	DAR	KAN	BRI								33rd	172	
2022	Our Motorsports	02	Chevy																											TEX; 21	TAL	ROV	LVS; 21	HOM; 16	MAR	PHO; 21	33rd	172	
2023	Jordan Anderson Racing	31	Chevy	DAY; 4	CAL; 20	LVS; 37	PHO; 18	ATL; 27	COA; 17	RCH; 16	MAR; 11	TAL; 7	DOV; 17	DAR; 24	CLT; 6	PIR; 17	SON; 38	NSH; 10	CSC; 28	ATL; 16	NHA; 31	POC; 35	ROA; 14	MCH; 9	IRC; 17	GLN; 26	DAY; 7	DAR; 13	KAN; 11	BRI; 15	TEX; 30	ROV; 22	LVS; 14	HOM; 12	MAR; 7	PHO; 13	16th	662	
2024	Jordan Anderson Racing	31	Chevy	DAY; 3	ATL; 5	LVS; 35	PHO; 35	COA; 11	**RCH**; 16	MAR; 37	TEX; 22	TAL; 30	DOV; 10	DAR; 31	CLT; 14	PIR; 9	SON; 11	IOW; 32	NHA; 26	NSH; 17	CSC; 34	POC; 33	IND; 35	MCH; 20	DAY; 34	DAR; 36	ATL; 12	GLN; 14	BRI; 37	KAN; 21	TAL; 30	ROV; 12	LVS; 22	HOM; 23	**MAR**; 36	PHO; 34	21st	468	
2025	Alpha Prime Racing	4	Chevy	DAY; 29	ATL; 27	COA; DNQ	PHO; 11	LVS; 21	HOM; 17	MAR; 12	DAR; 20	BRI; 18	CAR; 2	TAL; 38	TEX; 14	CLT; 37	NSH; 37	MXC; 35	POC; 22	ATL; 37	CSC; 24	SON; 28	DOV; 19	IND; 14	IOW; 13	GLN; 22	DAY; 38	PIR; 30	GTW; 8	BRI; 16	KAN; 27	ROV; 16	LVS; 30	TAL; 7	MAR; 29	PHO; 27	22nd	479	
2026	Viking Motorsports	99	Chevy	DAY; 14	ATL; 2	COA; 30	PHO; 14	LVS; 12	DAR; 8	MAR; 11	CAR; 8	BRI; 9	KAN; 36	TAL; 9	TEX; 5	GLN; 7	DOV; 38	CLT; 12	NSH; 12	POC; 15	COR; 7	SON; 5	CHI; 14	ATL; 3	IND; 11	IOW; 13	DAY; 14	DAR; 21	GTW; 6	BRI; 8	LVS; 19	CLT; 12	PHO; 11	TAL; 31	MAR; 15	HOM; 5	11th	2263	

==== Craftsman Truck Series ====
NASCAR Craftsman Truck Series results
Year	Team	No.	Make	1	2	3	4	5	6	7	8	9	10	11	12	13	14	15	16	17	18	19	20	21	22	23	24	25	NCWTC	Pts	Ref
2022	Young's Motorsports	20	Chevy	DAY	LVS	ATL	COA	MAR	BRD	DAR	KAN	TEX	CLT	GTW	SON	KNX	NSH	MOH	POC	IRP	RCH	KAN	BRI	TAL; 16	HOM	PHO			98th	0^{1}	
2026	Halmar Friesen Racing	62	Toyota	DAY	ATL	STP	DAR	CAR	BRI	TEX	GLN	DOV	CLT	NSH; 11	MCH	COR	LRP	NWS	IRP	RCH	NHA	BRI	KAN	CLT	PHO	TAL	MAR	HOM	110th	0^{1}	

^{*} Season still in progress
^{1} Ineligible for series points

=== ARCA Menards Series ===
(key) (Bold – Pole position awarded by qualifying time. Italics – Pole position earned by points standings or practice time. * – Most laps led.)

ARCA Menards Series results
Year	Team	No.	Make	1	2	3	4	5	6	7	8	9	10	11	12	13	14	15	16	17	18	19	20	AMSC	Pts	Ref
2020	Cook-Finley Racing	42	Toyota	DAY	PHO	TAL	POC	IRP	KEN	IOW	KAN	TOL	TOL	MCH	DAY	GTW	I44	TOL; 8	BRI; 19	WIN	MEM	ISF	KAN	44th	61	
2021	Cook-Finley Racing	42	Toyota	DAY	PHO	TAL	KAN	TOL	CLT	MOH	POC	ELK	BLN	IOW	WIN	GLN	MCH	ISF	MLW; 11	DSF	BRI	SLM	KAN	92nd	33	
2023	Young's Motorsports	02	Chevy	DAY	PHO	TAL	KAN	CLT	BLN	ELK	MOH	IOW	POC	MCH	IRP	GLN; 18	ISF	MLW	DSF	KAN	BRI	SLM	TOL	104th	26	

==== ARCA Menards Series East ====
ARCA Menards Series East results
Year	Team	No.	Make	1	2	3	4	5	6	7	8	9	10	11	12	AMSEC	Pts	Ref
2019	Visconti Motorsports	74	Toyota	NSM	BRI	SBO	SBO	MEM; 10	NHA	IOW	GLN	BRI	GTW; 5	NHA	DOV	24th	73	
2020	Cook-Finley Racing	42	Toyota	NSM; 8	TOL; 7	DOV; 7	TOL; 8	BRI; 19	FIF; 10							4th	305	
2021	Cook-Finley Racing	42	Toyota	NSM; 9	FIF; 6	NSV; 7	DOV; 12	SNM; 4	IOW	MLW; 11	BRI					7th	266	

==== ARCA Menards Series West ====
ARCA Menards Series West results
Year	Team	No.	Make	1	2	3	4	5	6	7	8	9	10	11	12	13	14	AMSWC	Pts	Ref
2019	Visconti Motorsports	74	Toyota	LVS	IRW	TUS	TUS	CNS	SON	DCS	IOW	EVG	GTW; 5	MER	AAS	KCR	PHO	N/A	—	
2023	Young's Motorsports	02	Chevy	PHO	IRW	KCR	PIR; 5	SON; 25	IRW	SHA	EVG	AAS	LVS	MAD	PHO			30th	58	
