= 2024 Cook Out 400 (Richmond) =

Race details
- Race 23 of 36 in the 2024 NASCAR Cup Series
- Date: August 11, 2024
- Location: Richmond Raceway in Richmond, Virginia
- Course: Permanent racing facility
- Course length: 0.75 miles (1.207 km)
- Distance: 408 laps, 306 mi (489.6 km)
- Scheduled distance: 400 laps, 300 mi (480 km)
- Average speed: 100.155 miles per hour (161.184 km/h)

Pole position
Driver	Denny Hamlin	Joe Gibbs Racing
- Time: 22.850

Most laps led
Driver	Denny Hamlin	Joe Gibbs Racing
- Laps: 125

Winner
No. 3	Austin Dillon	Richard Childress Racing

Television in the United States
- Network: USA
- Announcers: Rick Allen, Jeff Burton and Steve Letarte
- Nielsen ratings: 1.2 (2.22 million)

Radio in the United States
- Radio: MRN
- Booth announcers: Alex Hayden, Jeff Striegle, and Todd Gordon
- Turn announcers: Mike Bagley (Backstretch)

The 2024 Cook Out 400 was a NASCAR Cup Series race that was held on August 11, 2024, at Richmond Raceway in Richmond, Virginia. Contested over 408 laps—extended from 400 laps due to an overtime finish, on the 0.75-mile (1.21 km) asphalt short track, it was the 23rd race of the 2024 NASCAR Cup Series season. Austin Dillon won the race, breaking a 68-race winless drought, dating back to the 2022 Coke Zero Sugar 400. Denny Hamlin finished 2nd, and Tyler Reddick finished 3rd. Bubba Wallace and Ross Chastain rounded out the top five, and Christopher Bell, Kyle Larson, Carson Hocevar, Chase Elliott, and Daniel Suárez rounded out the top ten.

== Report ==
=== Background ===
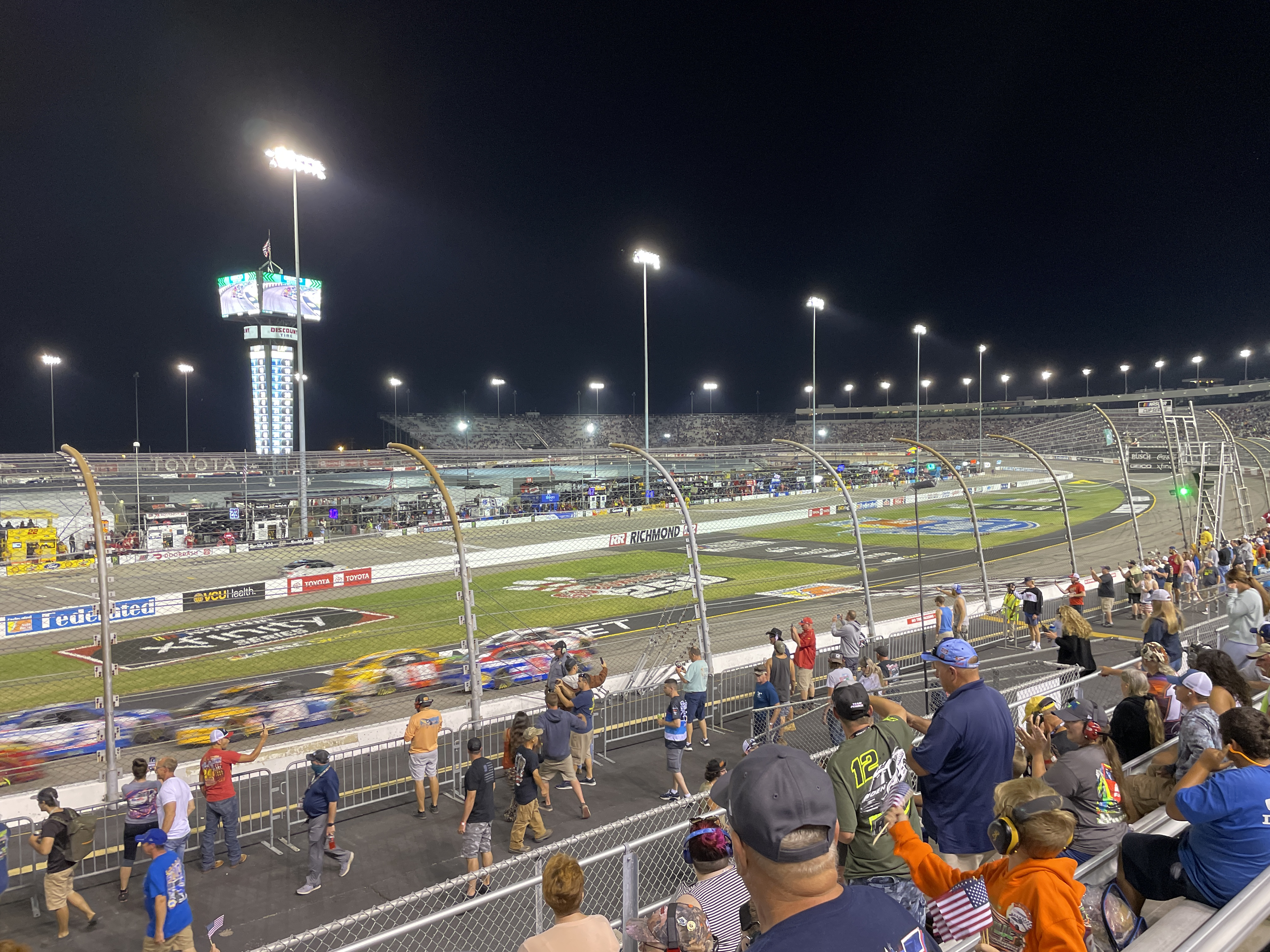
Richmond Raceway, the track where the race was held.

Richmond Raceway (RR) is a 0.75 miles (1.21 km), D-shaped, asphalt race track located just outside Richmond, Virginia in unincorporated Henrico County. It hosts the NASCAR Cup Series, NASCAR Xfinity Series and the NASCAR Craftsman Truck Series. Known as "America's premier short track", it has formerly hosted events such as the International Race of Champions, Denny Hamlin Short Track Showdown, and the USAC sprint car series. Due to Richmond Raceway's unique "D" shape which allows drivers to reach high speeds, Richmond has long been known as a short track that races like a superspeedway. With its multiple racing grooves, and proclivity for contact Richmond is a favorite among NASCAR drivers and fans.

==== Race Notes ====
The race was the first after a two-week break due to NBC Sports' coverage of the 2024 Summer Olympics.

On July 16, NASCAR announced they would use the tires used in the All-Star Race at North Wilkesboro Speedway. Teams will have six sets of yellow-lettered primary tires (it will generally require six sets of tires during the race, where teams often change tires on pit stops), and two sets of red-lettered option tires during the race, and teams will use one set of each in practice sessions. The eight sets of tires is the same as was the case in the March race, although two sets each will be of the softer option tires for this race. Teams will qualify on the primary tire, and must use both the primary and option tire during the race. Teams may not mix red and yellow letter tires on the car at the same time during the race.

==== Entry list ====
- (R) denotes rookie driver.
- (i) denotes driver who is ineligible for series driver points.

No.	Driver	Team	Manufacturer
1	Ross Chastain	Trackhouse Racing	Chevrolet
2	Austin Cindric	Team Penske	Ford
3	Austin Dillon	Richard Childress Racing	Chevrolet
4	Josh Berry (R)	Stewart-Haas Racing	Ford
5	Kyle Larson	Hendrick Motorsports	Chevrolet
6	Brad Keselowski	RFK Racing	Ford
7	Corey LaJoie	Spire Motorsports	Chevrolet
8	Kyle Busch	Richard Childress Racing	Chevrolet
9	Chase Elliott	Hendrick Motorsports	Chevrolet
10	Noah Gragson	Stewart-Haas Racing	Ford
11	Denny Hamlin	Joe Gibbs Racing	Toyota
12	Ryan Blaney	Team Penske	Ford
14	Chase Briscoe	Stewart-Haas Racing	Ford
15	Riley Herbst (i)	Rick Ware Racing	Ford
16	Ty Dillon (i)	Kaulig Racing	Chevrolet
17	Chris Buescher	RFK Racing	Ford
19	Martin Truex Jr.	Joe Gibbs Racing	Toyota
20	Christopher Bell	Joe Gibbs Racing	Toyota
21	Harrison Burton	Wood Brothers Racing	Ford
22	Joey Logano	Team Penske	Ford
23	Bubba Wallace	23XI Racing	Toyota
24	William Byron	Hendrick Motorsports	Chevrolet
31	Daniel Hemric	Kaulig Racing	Chevrolet
34	Michael McDowell	Front Row Motorsports	Ford
38	Todd Gilliland	Front Row Motorsports	Ford
41	Ryan Preece	Stewart-Haas Racing	Ford
42	John Hunter Nemechek	Legacy Motor Club	Toyota
43	Erik Jones	Legacy Motor Club	Toyota
45	Tyler Reddick	23XI Racing	Toyota
47	Ricky Stenhouse Jr.	JTG Daugherty Racing	Chevrolet
48	Alex Bowman	Hendrick Motorsports	Chevrolet
51	Justin Haley	Rick Ware Racing	Ford
54	Ty Gibbs	Joe Gibbs Racing	Toyota
66	Parker Retzlaff (i)	Power Source	Ford
71	Zane Smith (R)	Spire Motorsports	Chevrolet
77	Carson Hocevar (R)	Spire Motorsports	Chevrolet
99	Daniel Suárez	Trackhouse Racing	Chevrolet
Official entry list

== Practice ==
Austin Dillon was the fastest in the practice session with a time of 22.698 seconds and a speed of 118.953 mph (191.436 km/h).

=== Practice results ===
Pos	No.	Driver	Team	Manufacturer	Time	Speed
1	3	Austin Dillon	Richard Childress Racing	Chevrolet	22.698	118.953
2	23	Bubba Wallace	23XI Racing	Toyota	22.716	118.859
3	20	Christopher Bell	Joe Gibbs Racing	Toyota	22.735	118.760
Official practice results

== Qualifying ==
Denny Hamlin scored the pole for the race with a time of 22.850 and a speed of 118.162 mph (190.163 km/h).

=== Qualifying results ===
Pos	No.	Driver	Team	Manufacturer	R1	R2
1	11	Denny Hamlin	Joe Gibbs Racing	Toyota	22.858	22.850
2	19	Martin Truex Jr.	Joe Gibbs Racing	Toyota	22.548	22.916
3	4	Josh Berry (R)	Stewart-Haas Racing	Ford	22.493	22.959
4	9	Chase Elliott	Hendrick Motorsports	Chevrolet	22.655	22.861
5	20	Christopher Bell	Joe Gibbs Racing	Toyota	22.646	22.961
6	3	Austin Dillon	Richard Childress Racing	Chevrolet	22.797	22.926
7	20	Chris Buescher	RFK Racing	Ford	22.523	22.986
8	23	Bubba Wallace	23XI Racing	Toyota	22.782	22.961
9	22	Joey Logano	Team Penske	Ford	22.652	23.058
10	45	Tyler Reddick	23XI Racing	Toyota	22.549	22.981
11	12	Ryan Blaney	Team Penske	Ford	22.671	—
12	8	Kyle Busch	Richard Childress Racing	Chevrolet	22.868	—
13	24	William Byron	Hendrick Motorsports	Chevrolet	22.672	—
14	54	Ty Gibbs	Joe Gibbs Racing	Chevrolet	22.896	—
15	5	Kyle Larson	Hendrick Motorsports	Chevrolet	22.686	—
16	10	Noah Gragson	Stewart-Haas Racing	Toyota	22.913	—
17	48	Alex Bowman	Hendrick Motorsports	Chevrolet	22.728	—
18	2	Austin Cindric	Team Penske	Ford	22.920	—
19	77	Carson Hocevar (R)	Spire Motorsports	Chevrolet	22.742	—
20	71	Zane Smith (R)	Spire Motorsports	Chevrolet	22.989	—
21	99	Daniel Suárez	Trackhouse Racing	Chevrolet	22.743	—
22	1	Ross Chastain	Trackhouse Racing	Chevrolet	23.091	—
23	38	Todd Gilliland	Front Row Motorsports	Ford	22.769	—
24	7	Corey LaJoie	Spire Motorsports	Chevrolet	23.098	—
25	14	Chase Briscoe	Stewart-Haas Racing	Ford	22.807	—
26	41	Ryan Preece	Stewart-Haas Racing	Ford	23.165	—
27	43	Erik Jones	Legacy Motor Club	Toyota	22.840	—
28	34	Michael McDowell	Front Row Motorsports	Ford	23.330	—
29	6	Brad Keselowski	RFK Racing	Ford	22.886	—
30	16	Ty Dillon	Kaulig Racing	Chevrolet	23.333	—
31	21	Harrison Burton	Wood Brothers Racing	Ford	22.960	—
32	31	Daniel Hemric	Kaulig Racing	Chevrolet	23.361	—
33	47	Ricky Stenhouse Jr.	JTG Daugherty Racing	Chevrolet	22.974	—
34	15	Riley Herbst (i)	Rick Ware Racing	Ford	23.421	—
35	42	John Hunter Nemechek	Legacy Motor Club	Toyota	22.998	—
36	51	Justin Haley	Rick Ware Racing	Ford	23.436	—
37	66	Parker Retzlaff (i)	Power Source	Ford	23.189	—
Official qualifying results

== Race ==
=== Race results ===
==== Stage results ====
Stage One Laps: 70

Pos	No	Driver	Team	Manufacturer	Points
1	20	Christopher Bell	Joe Gibbs Racing	Toyota	10
2	11	Denny Hamlin	Joe Gibbs Racing	Toyota	9
3	19	Martin Truex Jr.	Joe Gibbs Racing	Toyota	8
4	22	Joey Logano	Team Penske	Ford	7
5	23	Bubba Wallace	23XI Racing	Toyota	6
6	9	Chase Elliott	Hendrick Motorsports	Chevrolet	5
7	3	Austin Dillon	Richard Childress Racing	Chevrolet	4
8	17	Chris Buescher	RFK Racing	Ford	3
9	45	Tyler Reddick	23XI Racing	Toyota	2
10	4	Josh Berry (R)	Stewart-Haas Racing	Ford	1
Official stage one results

Stage Two Laps: 160

Pos	No	Driver	Team	Manufacturer	Points
1	99	Daniel Suárez	Trackhouse Racing	Chevrolet	10
2	20	Christopher Bell	Joe Gibbs Racing	Toyota	9
3	11	Denny Hamlin	Joe Gibbs Racing	Toyota	8
4	22	Joey Logano	Team Penske	Ford	7
5	3	Austin Dillon	Richard Childress Racing	Chevrolet	6
6	34	Michael McDowell	Front Row Motorsports	Ford	5
7	45	Tyler Reddick	23XI Racing	Toyota	4
8	23	Bubba Wallace	23XI Racing	Toyota	3
9	77	Carson Hocevar (R)	Spire Motorsports	Chevrolet	2
10	9	Chase Elliott	Hendrick Motorsports	Chevrolet	1
Official stage two results

=== Final Stage results ===
Stage Three Laps: 170

Having taken the lead from Denny Hamlin with 28 laps to go, Austin Dillon, who entered the race 32nd in points, drove out to a two and a half second lead over the next twenty five laps. However, a crash right in front of him involving Ricky Stenhouse Jr. and Ryan Preece sent the race into overtime. When the race resumed, Joey Logano, using the high line to his advantage, took the lead on the restart and led coming to turn three on the final lap. Dillon, realizing what was at stake, and despite being four car lengths back of Logano entering the corner, sent it in, and got into the back of Logano, sending him into a spin. Hamlin went through on the bottom but Dillon also got into the 11 car, sending Hamlin into the outside wall as Dillon took the win under caution. Logano and Hamlin later criticized Dillon for his actions.

Three days later, NASCAR stripped Dillon of his playoff eligibility, whilst allowing the win to stand, whilst also fining Logano $50,000 for showing his frustrating with the RCR crew by spinning his tires in front of Dillon’s pit stall. In addition, Dillon’s spotter Brandon Benesch was suspended for three races after audio surfaced of him telling Dillon to “wreck him” (Hamlin) on the team radio. RCR later announced they would appeal the penalties. An independent appeals panel upheld all but the Benesch penalty on August 21. Benesch, who had served the first of his three race suspension at Michigan, had his penalty reduced to time served (one race).

Pos	Grid	No	Driver	Team	Manufacturer	Laps	Points
1	6	3	Austin Dillon (Note: Dillon was docked 25 points following the penalties on August 14.)	Richard Childress Racing	Chevrolet	408	25
2	1	11	Denny Hamlin	Joe Gibbs Racing	Toyota	408	52
3	10	45	Tyler Reddick	23XI Racing	Toyota	408	40
4	8	23	Bubba Wallace	23XI Racing	Toyota	408	42
5	22	1	Ross Chastain	Trackhouse Racing	Chevrolet	408	32
6	5	20	Christopher Bell	Joe Gibbs Racing	Toyota	408	50
7	15	5	Kyle Larson	Hendrick Motorsports	Chevrolet	408	30
8	19	77	Carson Hocevar (R)	Spire Motorsports	Chevrolet	408	31
9	4	9	Chase Elliott	Hendrick Motorsports	Chevrolet	408	34
10	21	99	Daniel Suárez	Trackhouse Racing	Chevrolet	408	37
11	11	12	Ryan Blaney	Team Penske	Ford	408	26
12	12	8	Kyle Busch	Richard Childress Racing	Chevrolet	408	25
13	13	24	William Byron	Hendrick Motorsports	Chevrolet	408	24
14	3	4	Josh Berry (R)	Stewart-Haas Racing	Ford	408	24
15	28	34	Michael McDowell	Front Row Motorsports	Ford	408	27
16	29	6	Brad Keselowski	RFK Racing	Ford	408	21
17	23	38	Todd Gilliland	Front Row Motorsports	Ford	408	20
18	7	17	Chris Buescher	RFK Racing	Ford	408	22
19	9	22	Joey Logano	Team Penske	Ford	408	32
20	16	10	Noah Gragson	Stewart-Haas Racing	Ford	407	17
21	25	14	Chase Briscoe	Stewart-Haas Racing	Ford	407	16
22	14	54	Ty Gibbs	Joe Gibbs Racing	Toyota	407	15
23	20	71	Zane Smith (R)	Spire Motorsports	Chevrolet	407	14
24	18	2	Austin Cindric	Team Penske	Ford	407	13
25	26	41	Ryan Preece	Stewart-Haas Racing	Ford	407	12
26	30	16	Ty Dillon (i)	Kaulig Racing	Chevrolet	407	11
27	36	51	Justin Haley	Rick Ware Racing	Ford	406	10
28	17	48	Alex Bowman	Hendrick Motorsports	Chevrolet	406	9
29	27	43	Erik Jones	Legacy Motor Club	Toyota	406	8
30	32	31	Daniel Hemric	Kaulig Racing	Chevrolet	406	7
31	35	42	John Hunter Nemechek	Legacy Motor Club	Toyota	405	6
32	31	21	Harrison Burton	Wood Brothers Racing	Ford	405	5
33	34	15	Riley Herbst (i)	Rick Ware Racing	Ford	405	0
34	24	7	Corey LaJoie	Spire Motorsports	Chevrolet	404	3
35	37	66	Parker Retzlaff (i)	Power Source	Ford	402	0
36	33	47	Ricky Stenhouse Jr.	JTG Daugherty Racing	Chevrolet	397	1
37	2	19	Martin Truex Jr.	Joe Gibbs Racing	Toyota	250	9
Official race results

=== Race statistics ===
- Lead changes: 26 among 9 different drivers
- Cautions/Laps: 5 for 23
- Red flags: 0
- Time of race: 3 hours, 3 minutes, and 19 seconds
- Average speed: 100.155 miles per hour (161.184 km/h)

== Media ==
=== Television ===
USA covered the race on the television side. Rick Allen, Jeff Burton, and Steve Letarte called the race from the broadcast booth. Kim Coon, Marty Snider, and Dillon Welch handled the pit road duties from pit lane.

USA
Booth announcers	Pit reporters
Lap-by-lap: Rick Allen; Color-commentator: Jeff Burton; Color-commentator: Steve Letarte	Kim Coon; Marty Snider; Dillon Welch

=== Radio ===
The Motor Racing Network had the radio call for the race, which was also simulcast on Sirius XM NASCAR Radio. Alex Hayden, Jeff Striegle and Todd Gordon called the race from the broadcast booth for MRN when the field races through the front straightaway. Mike Bagley called the race from a platform when the field races down the backstraightaway. Jason Toy, Chris Wilner, and Winston Kelley called the action for MRN from pit lane.

MRN Radio
Booth announcers	Turn announcers	Pit reporters
Lead announcer: Alex Hayden; Announcer: Jeff Striegle; Announcer: Todd Gordon	Backstretch: Mike Bagley	Jason Toy; Chris Wilner; Winston Kelley

== Standings after the race ==
Drivers' Championship standings

	Pos	Driver	Points
	1	Kyle Larson	779
1	2	Tyler Reddick	774 (–5)
1	3	Chase Elliott	773 (–6)
	4	Denny Hamlin	758 (–21)
	5	Ryan Blaney	702 (–77)
2	6	Christopher Bell	701 (–78)
1	7	William Byron	678 (–101)
1	8	Martin Truex Jr.	662 (–117)
	9	Brad Keselowski	636 (–143)
	10	Alex Bowman	615 (–164)
	11	Ty Gibbs	602 (–177)
2	12	Bubba Wallace	587 (–192)
1	13	Chris Buescher	584 (–195)
1	14	Ross Chastain	584 (–195)
	15	Joey Logano	557 (–222)
1	16	Daniel Suárez	497 (–282)
Official driver's standings

Manufacturers' Championship standings

Pos	Manufacturer	Points
1	Chevrolet	839
2	Toyota	821 (–18)
3	Ford	796 (–43)

- Note: Only the first 16 positions are included for the driver standings.
- . – Driver has clinched a position in the NASCAR Cup Series playoffs.

== Notes ==
Previous race: 2024 Brickyard 400	NASCAR Cup Series; 2024 season	Next race: 2024 FireKeepers Casino 400
