= 2024 Coke Zero Sugar 400 =

Race details
- Race 25 of 36 in the 2024 NASCAR Cup Series
- Date: August 24, 2024
- Location: Daytona International Speedway in Daytona Beach, Florida
- Course: Permanent racing facility
- Course length: 2.5 miles (4 km)
- Distance: 164 laps, 410 mi (656 km)
- Scheduled distance: 160 laps, 400 mi (640 km)
- Average speed: 135.413 miles per hour (217.926 km/h)

Pole position
Driver	Michael McDowell	Front Row Motorsports
- Time: 49.136

Most laps led
Driver	Joey Logano	Team Penske
- Laps: 34

Winner
No. 21	Harrison Burton	Wood Brothers Racing

Television in the United States
- Network: NBC
- Announcers: Leigh Diffey, Jeff Burton and Steve Letarte (booth); Jimmie Johnson and Dale Jarrett (NBC Peacock Pitbox)
- Nielsen ratings: (4.2 million)

Radio in the United States
- Radio: MRN
- Booth announcers: Alex Hayden, Jeff Striegle and Rusty Wallace
- Turn announcers: Dave Moody (1 & 2), Mike Bagley (Backstretch) and Chris Wilner (3 & 4)

The 2024 Coke Zero Sugar 400 was a NASCAR Cup Series race held on August 24, 2024, at Daytona International Speedway in Daytona Beach, Florida. Contested over 164 laps (extended from 160 laps due to an overtime finish) on the 2.5-mile (4.0 km) superspeedway, it was the 25th race of the 2024 NASCAR Cup Series season.

Harrison Burton, driving for Wood Brothers Racing, won the race, getting his first career win in the Cup Series and getting the team's 100th win in the Cup Series. Kyle Busch finished 2nd, and Christopher Bell finished 3rd. Cody Ware and Ty Gibbs rounded out the top five, while Bubba Wallace, Parker Retzlaff, Brad Keselowski, Daniel Hemric, and Chris Buescher rounded out the top ten.

== Report ==
=== Background ===
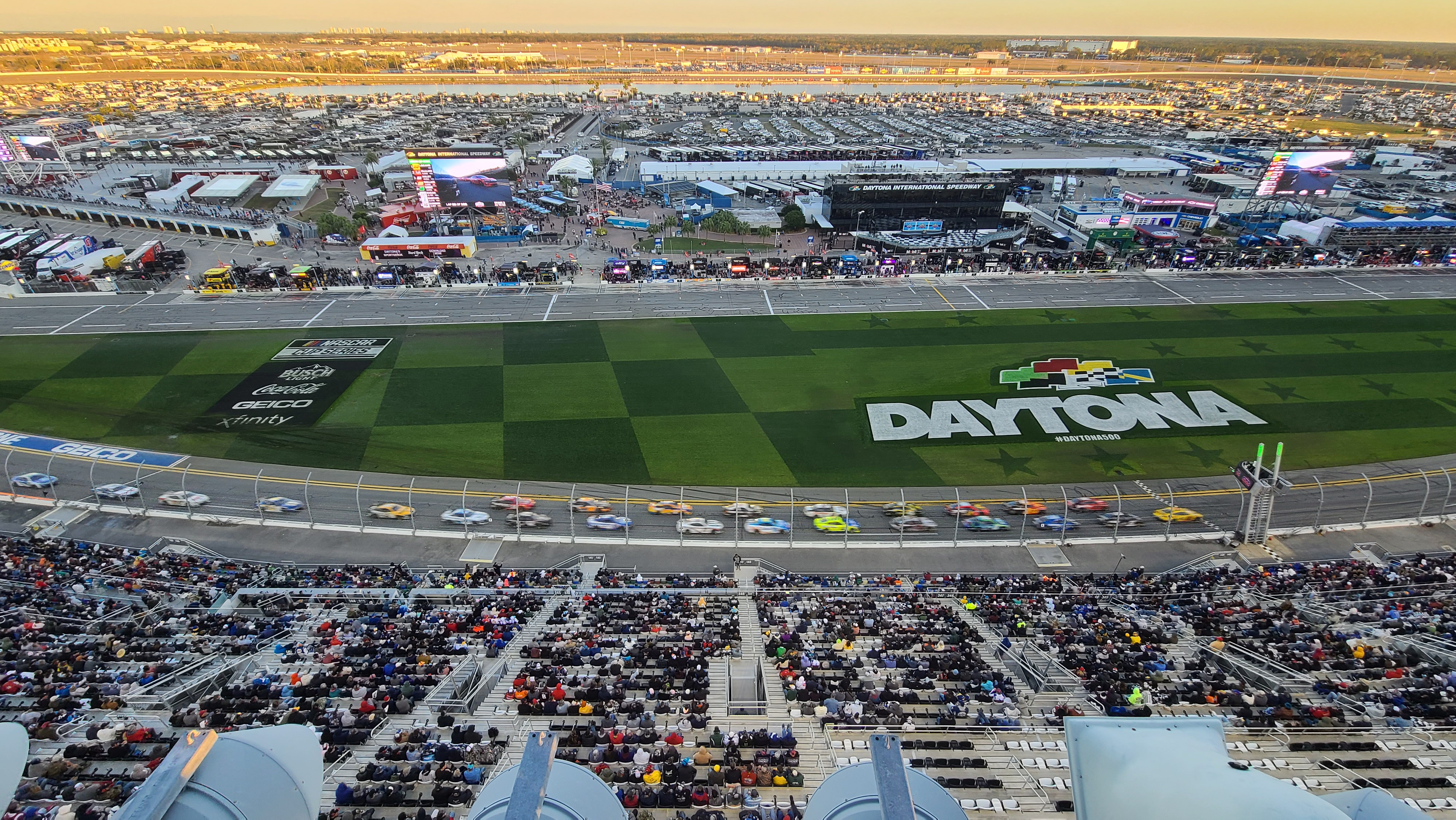
Daytona International Speedway, the site of the race.

The race was held at Daytona International Speedway, a race track located in Daytona Beach, Florida, United States. Since its opening in 1959, the track has been the home of the Daytona 500, the most prestigious race in NASCAR. In addition to NASCAR, the track also hosts ARCA, AMA Superbike, USCC, SCCA, and Motocross races. It features multiple layouts including the primary 2.5 miles (4.0 km) high speed tri-oval, a 3.56 miles (5.73 km) sports car course, a 2.95 miles (4.75 km) motorcycle course, and a .25 miles (0.40 km) karting and motorcycle flat-track. The track's 180-acre (73 ha) infield includes the 29-acre (12 ha) Lake Lloyd, which has hosted powerboat racing. The speedway is owned and operated by International Speedway Corporation.

The track was built in 1959 by NASCAR founder William "Bill" France, Sr. to host racing held at the former Daytona Beach Road Course. His banked design permitted higher speeds and gave fans a better view of the cars. Lights were installed around the track in 1998 and today, it is the third-largest single lit outdoor sports facility. The speedway has been renovated three times, with the infield renovated in 2004 and the track repaved twice — in 1978 and in 2010. On January 22, 2013, the track unveiled artist depictions of a renovated speedway. On July 5 of that year, ground was broken for a project that would remove the backstretch seating and completely redevelop the frontstretch seating. The renovation to the speedway was done by Rossetti Architects. The project, named "Daytona Rising", was completed in January 2016, at a cost of US $400 million, placing emphasis on improving fan experience with five expanded and redesigned fan entrances (called "injectors") as well as wider and more comfortable seating with more restrooms and concession stands. After the renovations, the track's grandstands included 101,000 permanent seats with the ability to increase permanent seating to 125,000. The project was completed before the start of Speedweeks.

Prior to the race, NASCAR imposed a 75-point penalty on Denny Hamlin after Toyota self-reported an infraction from the May Darlington race. The 11 car, as was required, used the engine from the Bristol race winning car at Darlington, but the engine was taken to Toyota's California factory to be rebuilt instead of being taken to NASCAR for inspection. The team lost credit for the win for playoff seeding purposes and was assessed a ten playoff point penalty in addition to the 75 point penalty.

==== Entry list ====
- (R) denotes rookie driver.
- (i) denotes driver who is ineligible for series driver points.

No.	Driver	Team	Manufacturer
1	Ross Chastain	Trackhouse Racing	Chevrolet
2	Austin Cindric	Team Penske	Ford
3	Austin Dillon	Richard Childress Racing	Chevrolet
4	Josh Berry (R)	Stewart-Haas Racing	Ford
5	Kyle Larson	Hendrick Motorsports	Chevrolet
6	Brad Keselowski	RFK Racing	Ford
7	Corey LaJoie	Spire Motorsports	Chevrolet
8	Kyle Busch	Richard Childress Racing	Chevrolet
9	Chase Elliott	Hendrick Motorsports	Chevrolet
10	Noah Gragson	Stewart-Haas Racing	Ford
11	Denny Hamlin	Joe Gibbs Racing	Toyota
12	Ryan Blaney	Team Penske	Ford
14	Chase Briscoe	Stewart-Haas Racing	Ford
15	Cody Ware	Rick Ware Racing	Ford
16	Shane van Gisbergen (i)	Kaulig Racing	Chevrolet
17	Chris Buescher	RFK Racing	Ford
19	Martin Truex Jr.	Joe Gibbs Racing	Toyota
20	Christopher Bell	Joe Gibbs Racing	Toyota
21	Harrison Burton	Wood Brothers Racing	Ford
22	Joey Logano	Team Penske	Ford
23	Bubba Wallace	23XI Racing	Toyota
24	William Byron	Hendrick Motorsports	Chevrolet
31	Daniel Hemric	Kaulig Racing	Chevrolet
33	Austin Hill (i)	Richard Childress Racing	Chevrolet
34	Michael McDowell	Front Row Motorsports	Ford
38	Todd Gilliland	Front Row Motorsports	Ford
41	Ryan Preece	Stewart-Haas Racing	Ford
42	John Hunter Nemechek	Legacy Motor Club	Toyota
43	Erik Jones	Legacy Motor Club	Toyota
44	Joey Gase (i)	NY Racing Team	Chevrolet
45	Tyler Reddick	23XI Racing	Toyota
47	Ricky Stenhouse Jr.	JTG Daugherty Racing	Chevrolet
48	Alex Bowman	Hendrick Motorsports	Chevrolet
51	Justin Haley	Rick Ware Racing	Ford
54	Ty Gibbs	Joe Gibbs Racing	Toyota
62	Parker Retzlaff (i)	Beard Motorsports	Chevrolet
71	Zane Smith (R)	Spire Motorsports	Chevrolet
77	Carson Hocevar (R)	Spire Motorsports	Chevrolet
78	B. J. McLeod (i)	Live Fast Motorsports	Chevrolet
99	Daniel Suárez	Trackhouse Racing	Chevrolet
Official entry list

== Qualifying ==
Michael McDowell scored the pole for the race with a time of 49.136 and a speed of 183.165 mph (294.775 km/h).

=== Qualifying results ===
Pos	No.	Driver	Team	Manufacturer	R1	R2
1	34	Michael McDowell	Front Row Motorsports	Ford	49.218	49.136
2	38	Todd Gilliland	Front Row Motorsports	Ford	49.218	49.234
3	22	Joey Logano	Team Penske	Ford	49.386	49.358
4	41	Ryan Preece	Stewart-Haas Racing	Ford	49.473	49.366
5	4	Josh Berry (R)	Stewart-Haas Racing	Ford	49.485	49.397
6	14	Chase Briscoe	Stewart-Haas Racing	Ford	49.513	49.398
7	24	William Byron	Hendrick Motorsports	Chevrolet	49.535	49.435
8	2	Austin Cindric	Team Penske	Ford	49.450	49.451
9	5	Kyle Larson	Hendrick Motorsports	Chevrolet	49.447	49.478
10	9	Chase Elliott	Hendrick Motorsports	Chevrolet	49.554	49.518
11	8	Kyle Busch	Richard Childress Racing	Chevrolet	49.556	—
12	6	Brad Keselowski	RFK Racing	Ford	49.575	—
13	17	Chris Buescher	RFK Racing	Ford	49.584	—
14	12	Ryan Blaney	Team Penske	Ford	49.587	—
15	10	Noah Gragson	Stewart-Haas Racing	Ford	49.612	—
16	3	Austin Dillon	Richard Childress Racing	Chevrolet	49.614	—
17	19	Martin Truex Jr.	Joe Gibbs Racing	Toyota	49.677	—
18	23	Bubba Wallace	23XI Racing	Toyota	49.690	—
19	11	Denny Hamlin	Joe Gibbs Racing	Toyota	49.722	—
20	21	Harrison Burton	Wood Brothers Racing	Ford	49.724	—
21	48	Alex Bowman	Hendrick Motorsports	Chevrolet	49.741	—
22	99	Daniel Suárez	Trackhouse Racing	Chevrolet	49.767	—
23	33	Austin Hill (i)	Richard Childress Racing	Chevrolet	49.769	—
24	1	Ross Chastain	Trackhouse Racing	Chevrolet	49.772	—
25	45	Tyler Reddick	23XI Racing	Toyota	49.774	—
26	54	Ty Gibbs	Joe Gibbs Racing	Toyota	49.792	—
27	20	Christopher Bell	Joe Gibbs Racing	Toyota	49.794	—
28	31	Daniel Hemric	Kaulig Racing	Chevrolet	49.820	—
29	62	Parker Retzlaff (i)	Beard Motorsports	Chevrolet	49.821	—
30	71	Zane Smith (R)	Spire Motorsports	Chevrolet	49.844	—
31	42	John Hunter Nemechek	Legacy Motor Club	Toyota	49.847	—
32	16	Shane van Gisbergen (i)	Kaulig Racing	Chevrolet	49.882	—
33	15	Cody Ware	Rick Ware Racing	Ford	49.924	—
34	7	Corey LaJoie	Spire Motorsports	Chevrolet	49.927	—
35	47	Ricky Stenhouse Jr.	JTG Daugherty Racing	Chevrolet	50.057	—
36	51	Justin Haley	Rick Ware Racing	Ford	50.065	—
37	77	Carson Hocevar (R)	Spire Motorsports	Chevrolet	50.079	—
38	78	B. J. McLeod (i)	Live Fast Motorsports	Chevrolet	50.721	—
39	44	Joey Gase (i)	NY Racing Team	Chevrolet	51.395	—
40	43	Erik Jones	Legacy Motor Club	Toyota	0.000	—
Official qualifying results

== Race ==
=== Stage 1 ===
Pole sitter Michael McDowell led the first lap of the race as he and his teammate Todd Gilliland were side by side. The pack behind them form a third row by lap 3. McDowell would get in front of Gilliland by lap 5 for the lead, but was passed by Joey Logano on lap 6. On lap 7, rookie Josh Berry would take the lead. On lap 8, Brad Keselowski would take the lead. Berry would get in front for a brief moment the next lap before Keselowski took it back. On lap 12, Logano would take the lead before Berry would pass him the same lap and take the lead. On lap 13, Daytona 500 winner William Byron would take the lead before Berry took it back the next lap. On lap 15, Logano would take the lead. Josh Berry attempted to take the lead on lap 17 but failed to get in front of Logano. Berry and Gilliland tried on lap 18 but failed to get in front of Logano. On lap 20, Gilliland would take the lead. On lap 22, Logano would take the lead back. Gilliland would take it back on lap 24. On lap 27, Austin Cindric took the lead but got passed by Berry on the same lap and Berry took the lead. On lap 30, Joey Logano took the lead. On laps 31 and 34, Keselowski attempted to take the lead but failed to get in front of Logano. On lap 35, the last lap of stage 1, Keselowski would take the lead but would get immediately passed by Berry, who would win stage 1 for his first career Cup Series stage win.

=== Stage 2 ===
During pit stops, some fuel spilled out of Daniel Suárez's car. Suárez was stuck in his pit box trying not to hit Harrison Burton. Behind Suárez, Denny Hamlin ran over the fuel spill, igniting a blaze that caught the left rear diffuser of Suárez's car on fire as he drove off of pit road. Crews were unable to extinguish the fire when Suárez entered back onto pit road. The fire grew and engulfed the entire rear of Suárez's vehicle. Suárez got out unhurt and was given a chance to continue to race even with the whole rear charred and melted from the fire; Suárez elected to end his race. Logano won the race off of pit road and he led the field to the restart on lap 42.

Chris Buescher battled for the lead with Logano for a few laps but could not get in front of him. On lap 46, Bubba Wallace took the lead. On lap 48, Buescher took the lead. Chase Briscoe took the lead the next lap but was immediately passed by Wallace. Briscoe got side by side with Wallace the next lap and led the next 2 laps before Wallace took the lead back on lap 52. On lap 60, the first of three big ones would occur down the backstretch, bringing out the second caution of the race and the first for incident. Corey LaJoie pushed Noah Gragson down the backstretch at the wrong angle, turning Gragson into Justin Haley, causing a chain reaction that spun John Hunter Nemechek and Ross Chastain and collected a total of 19 cars. Drivers involved in the wreck included Ross Chastain, Martin Truex Jr., Ryan Preece, Alex Bowman, William Byron, Chase Elliott, Erik Jones, Tyler Reddick, Kyle Larson, Daniel Hemric, Corey LaJoie, Ryan Blaney, Austin Dillon, Denny Hamlin, Noah Gragson, Christopher Bell, John Hunter Nemechek, Ty Gibbs, and Austin Hill. Buescher won the race off of pit road and led the field to the restart on lap 67.

On lap 73, Wallace took the lead. On lap 75, Gilliland took the lead but was passed by Logano. On lap 78, Cindric got hit at the wrong angle by his teammate Ryan Blaney, causing Cindric to get sideways but Cindric saved it from spinning. At the same time, Kyle Larson took the lead. The lead changed hands between Larson and Logano multiple times until Logano was in the lead on lap 81. At the same time, three different drivers ran into issues, which brought out the third caution of the race. Truex Jr. and Jones suffered flat tires, while Shane van Gisbergen's engine expired, releasing a thick plume of smoke and fluid on the track and catching the right side tailpipe of his car on fire. The incident brought van Gisbergen's first Cup Series race at Daytona to an end. The race would restart on lap 89 with 7 laps to go in the stage. On the restart, Larson took the lead. On lap 92, Keselowski took the lead. On the last lap of stage 2 on lap 95, Logano regained the lead and would win the stage.

=== Final stage ===
Michael McDowell won the race off of pit road and he led the field to the restart with 60 laps to go on lap 101. With 42 to go, Justin Haley took the lead. With 23 to go, Nemechek attempted to take the lead but failed to get in front of Haley. Unfortunately for Nemechek, his chances of winning vanished when he got a big bump from Larson that sent him down into Haley. Nemechek turned across Haley's nose and spun, bringing out the 5th caution of the race. Before the caution flew, Kyle Busch took the lead. Cindric won the race off of pit road and led the field to the restart with 16 laps to go. Keselowski attempted to take the lead but beat Cindric to the restart box; Keselowski was penalized and had to come down pit road. Keselowski and his team protested, claiming Cindric spun his tires and started late, but their appeals were unsuccessful and the penalty was served with 13 to go. At the same time, Michael McDowell was attempting to take the lead but failed to get in front of Cindric. With 10 to go, McDowell would take the lead from Cindric and moved up to the high lane.

With 9 laps to go, McDowell was turned by Cindric in turn 1. McDowell's car spun across the track and was t-boned in the driver's door by Joey Logano. The car lifted off the ground and nearly hit the catchfence in the process, but did not flip. McDowell's spin caused the second big one of the night, bringing out the 6th caution of the race and damaging 15 cars. McDowell's near flip was almost similar to Tony Stewart's airborne wreck at Talladega Superspeedway in the Fall of 2012. Fortunately, McDowell would get out unhurt. The cars involved were Michael McDowell, Austin Cindric, Kyle Larson, Bubba Wallace, Joey Logano, Alex Bowman, Tyler Reddick, Justin Haley, William Byron, Ryan Blaney, Kyle Busch, Christopher Bell, Ricky Stenhouse Jr., Chris Buescher, and Austin Hill.

Cindric led the field back to green with 3 laps to go. With 2 to go, Berry attempted to take the lead but was turned by William Byron going down the backstretch, triggering the third and final big one, taking out 8 cars and bringing out the 7th and final caution of the race. Berry's car turned down into Cindric and the two spun to the inside, where Berry's car lifted off the ground and flipped onto its roof. The car continued to slide and hit the inside wall head-on, causing the car to spin violently while still upside down. The red flag was issued for 7 minutes as safety crews were turned the car back upright and allowed Berry to exit uninjured. Berry's wreck was almost identical to his teammate Ryan Preece's wreck in the prior year's race, but Berry's car avoided a similarly violent barrel roll due to the backstretch infield grass being removed on the backstretch, helping to slow cars and avoid digging into the grass. Berry became the fourth car in the top three Series of NASCAR to be involved in an airborne crash in the last week, joining McDowell and both Kyle Sieg and Corey LaJoie the previous week at Michigan, where both Sieg and LaJoie flipped over. The cars involved were Austin Cindric, Austin Dillon, Josh Berry, William Byron, Todd Gilliland, Erik Jones, and Austin Hill. After the 7th caution, six out of the 40 cars had not been involved in any incident during the race.

The wreck would set up NASCAR overtime, with Kyle Busch as the leader. Busch was looking for his first win of the season and to extend his winning streak to 20 consecutive seasons, dating back to 2005, his rookie year. On the restart, Busch would get to the lead with help from his former Joe Gibbs Racing teammate Christopher Bell. On the last lap, Busch raced out to a large gap to the second place cars of Christopher Bell and Harrison Burton, but the pack slowly caught up. Busch held onto the lead down the backstretch until Harrison Burton shot out to the lead into turn 3 after a big push from Parker Retzlaff. Burton held off a hard-charging Busch to win by just .047 seconds, achieving his first career victory in his 98th Cup Series start. The win was special for the entire Burton family, as Harrison's mother, Kim, was in his pit box, while his father, Jeff, was calling the race in the booth. Burton's win also marked the 100th victory for the Wood Brothers team in the Cup Series; it was the team's first since Ryan Blaney's win at Pocono in 2017. The win locked Burton into the NASCAR playoffs. Burton was the 14th different winner of 2024 and was 34th in points coming into the race, last among the full–time drivers.

Christopher Bell, Cody Ware, and Ty Gibbs rounded out the top 5 while Bubba Wallace, Parker Retzlaff, Brad Keselowski, Daniel Hemric, and Chris Buescher rounded out the top 10. This would be Cody Ware's best career Cup Series finish, his first career top 5 finish of his Cup Series career, and his second top 10 in his Cup Series career after he finished 6th in the same race two years prior. This was Parker Retzlaff's second career Cup Series start and his first career top 10, almost tying a feat accomplished by Trevor Bayne, who won in his second career Cup Series start; Retzlaff was in second on the final lap before falling back to 7th with no drafting help.

== Race results ==
=== Stage results ===
Stage One Laps: 35

Pos	No	Driver	Team	Manufacturer	Points
1	4	Josh Berry (R)	Stewart-Haas Racing	Ford	10
2	22	Joey Logano	Team Penske	Ford	9
3	17	Chris Buescher	RFK Racing	Ford	8
4	2	Austin Cindric	Team Penske	Ford	7
5	12	Ryan Blaney	Team Penske	Ford	6
6	38	Todd Gilliland	Front Row Motorsports	Ford	5
7	6	Brad Keselowski	RFK Racing	Ford	4
8	34	Michael McDowell	Front Row Motorsports	Ford	3
9	24	William Byron	Hendrick Motorsports	Chevrolet	2
10	5	Kyle Larson	Hendrick Motorsports	Chevrolet	1
Official stage one results

Stage Two Laps: 60

Pos	No	Driver	Team	Manufacturer	Points
1	22	Joey Logano	Team Penske	Ford	10
2	12	Ryan Blaney	Team Penske	Ford	9
3	6	Brad Keselowski	RFK Racing	Ford	8
4	5	Kyle Larson	Hendrick Motorsports	Chevrolet	7
5	38	Todd Gilliland	Front Row Motorsports	Ford	6
6	51	Justin Haley	Rick Ware Racing	Ford	5
7	8	Kyle Busch	Richard Childress Racing	Chevrolet	4
8	24	William Byron	Hendrick Motorsports	Chevrolet	3
9	17	Chris Buescher	RFK Racing	Ford	2
10	23	Bubba Wallace	23XI Racing	Toyota	1
Official stage two results

=== Final Stage results ===
Stage Three Laps: 65

Pos	Grid	No	Driver	Team	Manufacturer	Laps	Points
1	20	21	Harrison Burton	Wood Brothers Racing	Ford	164	40
2	11	8	Kyle Busch	Richard Childress Racing	Chevrolet	164	39
3	27	20	Christopher Bell	Joe Gibbs Racing	Toyota	164	34
4	33	15	Cody Ware	Rick Ware Racing	Ford	164	33
5	26	54	Ty Gibbs	Joe Gibbs Racing	Toyota	164	32
6	18	23	Bubba Wallace	23XI Racing	Toyota	164	32
7	29	62	Parker Retzlaff (i)	Beard Motorsports	Chevrolet	164	0
8	12	6	Brad Keselowski	RFK Racing	Ford	164	41
9	28	31	Daniel Hemric	Kaulig Racing	Chevrolet	164	28
10	13	17	Chris Buescher	RFK Racing	Ford	164	37
11	37	77	Carson Hocevar (R)	Spire Motorsports	Chevrolet	164	26
12	24	1	Ross Chastain	Trackhouse Racing	Chevrolet	164	25
13	30	71	Zane Smith (R)	Spire Motorsports	Chevrolet	164	24
14	6	14	Chase Briscoe	Stewart-Haas Racing	Ford	164	23
15	31	42	John Hunter Nemechek	Legacy Motor Club	Toyota	164	22
16	21	48	Alex Bowman	Hendrick Motorsports	Chevrolet	164	21
17	40	43	Erik Jones	Legacy Motor Club	Toyota	164	20
18	8	2	Austin Cindric	Team Penske	Ford	164	26
19	38	78	B. J. McLeod (i)	Live Fast Motorsports	Chevrolet	164	0
20	39	44	Joey Gase (i)	NY Racing Team	Chevrolet	164	0
21	9	5	Kyle Larson	Hendrick Motorsports	Chevrolet	163	24
22	16	3	Austin Dillon	Richard Childress Racing	Chevrolet	162	15
23	2	38	Todd Gilliland	Front Row Motorsports	Ford	162	25
24	17	19	Martin Truex Jr.	Joe Gibbs Racing	Toyota	161	13
25	23	33	Austin Hill (i)	Richard Childress Racing	Chevrolet	159	0
26	5	4	Josh Berry (R)	Stewart-Haas Racing	Ford	158	21
27	7	24	William Byron	Hendrick Motorsports	Chevrolet	158	15
28	25	45	Tyler Reddick	23XI Racing	Toyota	156	9
29	14	12	Ryan Blaney	Team Penske	Ford	154	23
30	1	34	Michael McDowell	Front Row Motorsports	Ford	151	10
31	3	22	Joey Logano	Team Penske	Ford	151	25
32	36	51	Justin Haley	Rick Ware Racing	Ford	151	10
33	35	47	Ricky Stenhouse Jr.	JTG Daugherty Racing	Chevrolet	151	4
34	34	7	Corey LaJoie	Spire Motorsports	Chevrolet	132	3
35	32	16	Shane van Gisbergen (i)	Kaulig Racing	Chevrolet	80	0
36	10	9	Chase Elliott	Hendrick Motorsports	Chevrolet	61	1
37	15	10	Noah Gragson	Stewart-Haas Racing	Ford	59	1
38	19	11	Denny Hamlin	Joe Gibbs Racing	Toyota	59	1
39	4	41	Ryan Preece	Stewart-Haas Racing	Ford	59	1
40	22	99	Daniel Suárez	Trackhouse Racing	Chevrolet	37	1
Official race results

=== Race statistics ===
- Lead changes: 40 among 16 different drivers
- Cautions/Laps: 7 for 34
- Red flags: 1 for 6 minutes and 52 seconds
- Time of race: 3 hours, 1 minute, and 40 seconds
- Average speed: 135.413 miles per hour (217.926 km/h)
- Margin of victory: 0.047 seconds

== Media ==
=== Television ===
NBC Sports covered the race on the television side. Leigh Diffey, 2000 race winner Jeff Burton, and Steve Letarte called the race from the broadcast booth. This was Diffey's first race as the main lap-by-lap commentator, as NBC announced prior to the event that he would be replacing Rick Allen for the rest of the season. Seven-time NASCAR Cup Series champion Jimmie Johnson and 1999 NASCAR Cup Series champion Dale Jarrett called from the NBC Peacock Pit Box on pit road. Dave Burns, Kim Coon, Parker Kligerman, and Marty Snider handled the pit road duties from pit lane. Seconds after Burton's son, Harrison, won the race, Diffey made the call, "Jeff, your little boy has done it!" for which he received praise online.

NBC
Booth announcers	Pit reporters
Lap-by-lap: Leigh Diffey; Color-commentator: Jeff Burton; Color-commentator: Steve Letarte; NBC Peacock Pitbox: Jimmie Johnson; NBC Peacock Pitbox: Dale Jarrett	Dave Burns; Kim Coon; Parker Kligerman; Marty Snider

=== Radio ===
MRN had the radio call for the race, which was also simulcast on Sirius XM NASCAR Radio. Alex Hayden, Jeff Striegle, and 1989 NASCAR Cup Series Champion Rusty Wallace called the action for MRN when the field raced thru the front straightaway. Lead Turn Announcer for MRN Dave Moody called the action for MRN from atop the Sunoco tower outside the exit of turn 2 when the field raced thru turns 1 & 2. Mike Bagley worked the Daytona Backstretch for MRN from a spotter's stand in the inside of the track. Chris Wilner worked the action for MRN when the field raced thru turns 3 & 4. Pit road was operated by lead pit reporter Steve Post, PRN Radio's Alan Cavanna, Brad Gillie & MRN's Jacklyn Drake.

MRN Radio
Booth announcers	Turn announcers	Pit reporters
Lead announcer: Alex Hayden; Announcer: Jeff Striegle; Announcer: Rusty Wallace	Turns 1 & 2: Dave Moody; Backstretch: Mike Bagley; Turns 3 & 4: Chris Wilner	Steve Post; Alan Cavanna; Brad Gillie; Jacklyn Drake

== Standings after the race ==
Drivers' Championship standings

	Pos	Driver	Points
	1	Tyler Reddick	823
1	2	Kyle Larson	806 (–17)
1	3	Chase Elliott	805 (–18)
	4	Ryan Blaney	755 (–68)
	5	William Byron	743 (–70)
1	6	Christopher Bell	737 (–86)
2	7	Brad Keselowski	719 (–104)
2	8	Denny Hamlin	712 (–111)
1	9	Martin Truex Jr.	695 (–128)
	10	Ty Gibbs	676 (–147)
1	11	Chris Buescher	658 (–165)
1	12	Alex Bowman	648 (–175)
1	13	Bubba Wallace	637 (–186)
1	14	Ross Chastain	631 (–192)
	15	Joey Logano	586 (–237)
1	16	Kyle Busch	552 (–271)
Official driver's standings

Manufacturers' Championship standings

Pos	Manufacturer	Points
1	Chevrolet	909
2	Toyota	895 (–14)
3	Ford	868 (–41)

- Note: Only the first 16 positions are included for the driver standings.
- . – Driver has clinched a position in the NASCAR Cup Series playoffs.

Previous race: 2024 FireKeepers Casino 400	NASCAR Cup Series; 2024 season	Next race: 2024 Cook Out Southern 500
