= 2024 FireKeepers Casino 400 =

Race details
- Race 24 of 36 in the 2024 NASCAR Cup Series
- Date: August 18–19, 2024
- Location: Michigan International Speedway in Brooklyn, Michigan
- Course: Permanent racing facility
- Course length: 2.0 miles (3.2 km)
- Distance: 206 laps, 412 mi (663 km)
- Scheduled distance: 200 laps, 400 mi (640 km)
- Average speed: 135.675 miles per hour (218.348 km/h)

Pole position
| Driver | Denny Hamlin | Joe Gibbs Racing |
- Time: 2.550 (Pandemic Formula)

Most laps led
| Driver | Kyle Larson | Hendrick Motorsports |
- Laps: 41

Winner
| No. 45 | Tyler Reddick | 23XI Racing |

Television in the United States
- Network: USA
- Announcers: Rick Allen, Jeff Burton and Steve Letarte
- Nielsen ratings: (2.111 Million)

Radio in the United States
- Radio: MRN
- Booth announcers: Alex Hayden, Jeff Striegle and Todd Gordon
- Turn announcers: Dave Moody (1–2) and Mike Bagley (3–4)

The 2024 FireKeepers Casino 400 was a NASCAR Cup Series race held on August 18 and 19, 2024, at Michigan International Speedway in Brooklyn, Michigan. Contested over 206 laps -- extended from 200 laps due to an overtime finish, on the 2.0-mile (3.2 km) D-shaped oval, it was the 24th race of the 2024 NASCAR Cup Series season. The race began on Sunday, August 18, before rain delayed it to Monday, August 19, after 51 laps were complete. Tyler Reddick won the race. William Byron finished 2nd, and Ty Gibbs finished 3rd. Kyle Busch and Brad Keselowski rounded out the top five, and Chris Buescher, Zane Smith, Daniel Suárez, Denny Hamlin, and Carson Hocevar rounded out the top ten.

== Report ==
=== Background ===
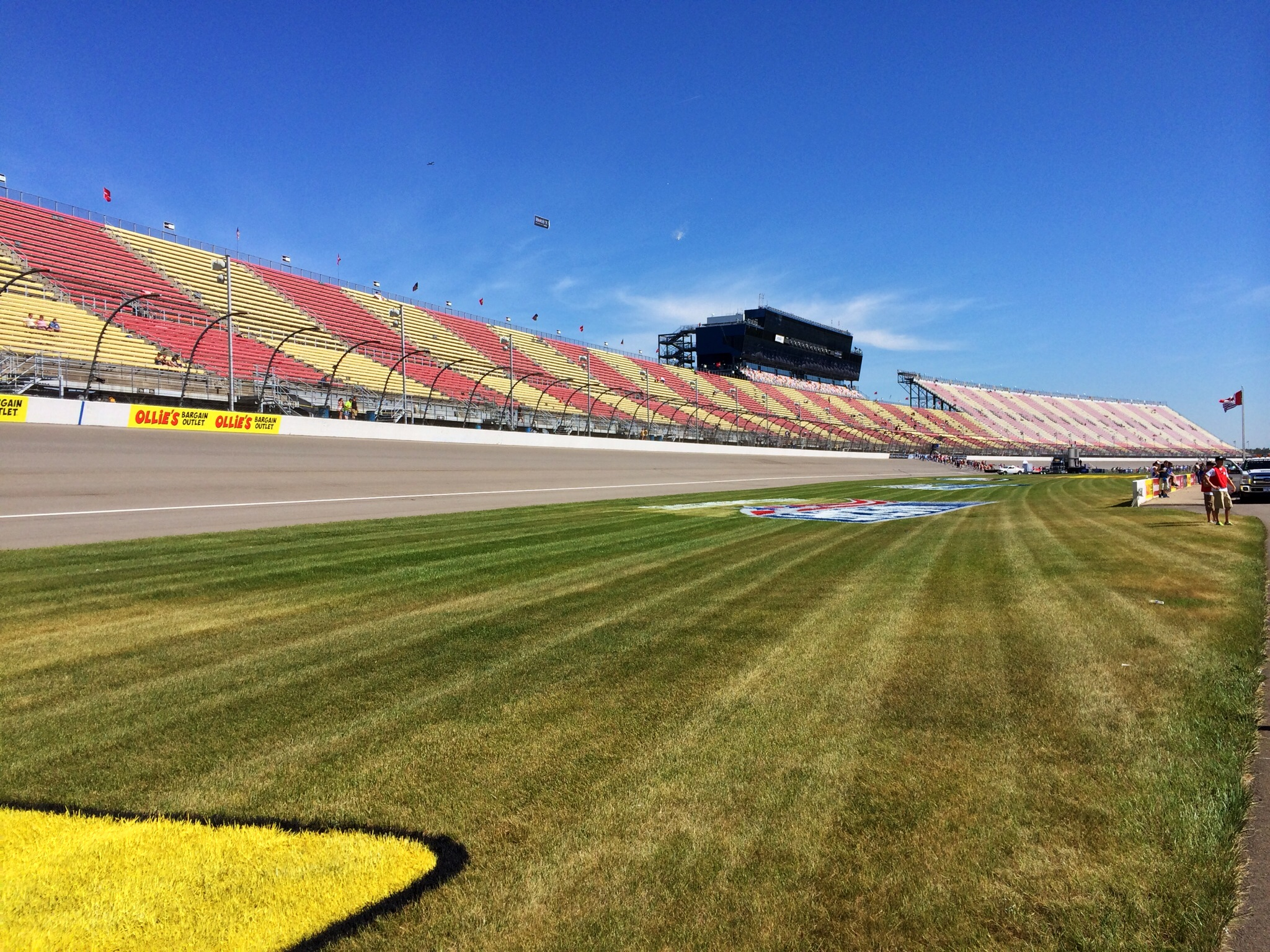
Michigan International Speedway, the track where the race was held.

The race was held at Michigan International Speedway, a two-mile (3.2 km) moderate-banked D-shaped speedway located in Brooklyn, Michigan. The track is used primarily for NASCAR events. It is known as a "sister track" to Texas World Speedway as MIS's oval design was a direct basis of TWS, with moderate modifications to the banking in the corners, and was used as the basis of Auto Club Speedway. The track is owned by International Speedway Corporation. Michigan International Speedway is recognized as one of motorsports' premier facilities because of its wide racing surface and high banking (by open-wheel standards; the 18-degree banking is modest by stock car standards).

==== Entry list ====
- (R) denotes rookie driver.
- (i) denotes driver who is ineligible for series driver points.

| No. | Driver | Team | Manufacturer |
|---|---|---|---|
| 1 | Ross Chastain | Trackhouse Racing | Chevrolet |
| 2 | Austin Cindric | Team Penske | Ford |
| 3 | Austin Dillon | Richard Childress Racing | Chevrolet |
| 4 | Josh Berry (R) | Stewart-Haas Racing | Ford |
| 5 | Kyle Larson | Hendrick Motorsports | Chevrolet |
| 6 | Brad Keselowski | RFK Racing | Ford |
| 7 | Corey LaJoie | Spire Motorsports | Chevrolet |
| 8 | Kyle Busch | Richard Childress Racing | Chevrolet |
| 9 | Chase Elliott | Hendrick Motorsports | Chevrolet |
| 10 | Noah Gragson | Stewart-Haas Racing | Ford |
| 11 | Denny Hamlin | Joe Gibbs Racing | Toyota |
| 12 | Ryan Blaney | Team Penske | Ford |
| 14 | Chase Briscoe | Stewart-Haas Racing | Ford |
| 15 | Cody Ware | Rick Ware Racing | Ford |
| 16 | A. J. Allmendinger (i) | Kaulig Racing | Chevrolet |
| 17 | Chris Buescher | RFK Racing | Ford |
| 19 | Martin Truex Jr. | Joe Gibbs Racing | Toyota |
| 20 | Christopher Bell | Joe Gibbs Racing | Toyota |
| 21 | Harrison Burton | Wood Brothers Racing | Ford |
| 22 | Joey Logano | Team Penske | Ford |
| 23 | Bubba Wallace | 23XI Racing | Toyota |
| 24 | William Byron | Hendrick Motorsports | Chevrolet |
| 31 | Daniel Hemric | Kaulig Racing | Chevrolet |
| 34 | Michael McDowell | Front Row Motorsports | Ford |
| 38 | Todd Gilliland | Front Row Motorsports | Ford |
| 41 | Ryan Preece | Stewart-Haas Racing | Ford |
| 42 | John Hunter Nemechek | Legacy Motor Club | Toyota |
| 43 | Erik Jones | Legacy Motor Club | Toyota |
| 45 | Tyler Reddick | 23XI Racing | Toyota |
| 47 | Ricky Stenhouse Jr. | JTG Daugherty Racing | Chevrolet |
| 48 | Alex Bowman | Hendrick Motorsports | Chevrolet |
| 51 | Justin Haley | Rick Ware Racing | Ford |
| 54 | Ty Gibbs | Joe Gibbs Racing | Toyota |
| 71 | Zane Smith (R) | Spire Motorsports | Chevrolet |
| 77 | Carson Hocevar (R) | Spire Motorsports | Chevrolet |
| 99 | Daniel Suárez | Trackhouse Racing | Chevrolet |
Official entry list

== Practice ==
Ross Chastain was the fastest in the practice session with a time of 37.441 seconds and a speed of 192.303 mph (309.482 km/h).

=== Practice results ===
| Pos | No. | Driver | Team | Manufacturer | Time | Speed |
|---|---|---|---|---|---|---|
| 1 | 1 | Ross Chastain | Trackhouse Racing | Chevrolet | 37.441 | 192.303 |
| 2 | 19 | Martin Truex Jr. | Joe Gibbs Racing | Toyota | 37.464 | 192.184 |
| 3 | 5 | Kyle Larson | Hendrick Motorsports | Chevrolet | 37.477 | 192.179 |
Official practice results

== Qualifying ==
Qualifying for the race was cancelled due to inclement weather. Denny Hamlin was awarded the pole for the race as a result of NASCAR's pandemic formula with a score of 2.550.

=== Starting lineup ===
| Pos | No. | Driver | Team | Manufacturer |
|---|---|---|---|---|
| 1 | 11 | Denny Hamlin | Joe Gibbs Racing | Toyota |
| 2 | 45 | Tyler Reddick | 23XI Racing | Toyota |
| 3 | 20 | Christopher Bell | Joe Gibbs Racing | Toyota |
| 4 | 5 | Kyle Larson | Hendrick Motorsports | Chevrolet |
| 5 | 23 | Bubba Wallace | 23XI Racing | Toyota |
| 6 | 9 | Chase Elliott | Hendrick Motorsports | Chevrolet |
| 7 | 1 | Ross Chastain | Trackhouse Racing | Chevrolet |
| 8 | 12 | Ryan Blaney | Team Penske | Ford |
| 9 | 24 | William Byron | Hendrick Motorsports | Chevrolet |
| 10 | 3 | Austin Dillon | Richard Childress Racing | Chevrolet |
| 11 | 77 | Carson Hocevar (R) | Spire Motorsports | Chevrolet |
| 12 | 99 | Daniel Suárez | Trackhouse Racing | Chevrolet |
| 13 | 8 | Kyle Busch | Richard Childress Racing | Chevrolet |
| 14 | 22 | Joey Logano | Team Penske | Ford |
| 15 | 6 | Brad Keselowski | RFK Racing | Ford |
| 16 | 4 | Josh Berry (R) | Stewart-Haas Racing | Ford |
| 17 | 34 | Michael McDowell | Front Row Motorsports | Ford |
| 18 | 17 | Chris Buescher | RFK Racing | Ford |
| 19 | 54 | Ty Gibbs | Joe Gibbs Racing | Toyota |
| 20 | 38 | Todd Gilliland | Front Row Motorsports | Ford |
| 21 | 14 | Chase Briscoe | Stewart-Haas Racing | Ford |
| 22 | 48 | Alex Bowman | Hendrick Motorsports | Chevrolet |
| 23 | 2 | Austin Cindric | Team Penske | Ford |
| 24 | 19 | Martin Truex Jr. | Joe Gibbs Racing | Toyota |
| 25 | 10 | Noah Gragson | Stewart-Haas Racing | Ford |
| 26 | 41 | Ryan Preece | Stewart-Haas Racing | Ford |
| 27 | 71 | Zane Smith (R) | Spire Motorsports | Chevrolet |
| 28 | 43 | Erik Jones | Legacy Motor Club | Toyota |
| 29 | 51 | Justin Haley | Rick Ware Racing | Ford |
| 30 | 47 | Ricky Stenhouse Jr. | JTG Daugherty Racing | Chevrolet |
| 31 | 7 | Corey LaJoie | Spire Motorsports | Chevrolet |
| 32 | 31 | Daniel Hemric | Kaulig Racing | Chevrolet |
| 33 | 42 | John Hunter Nemechek | Legacy Motor Club | Toyota |
| 34 | 21 | Harrison Burton | Wood Brothers Racing | Ford |
| 35 | 16 | A. J. Allmendinger (i) | Kaulig Racing | Chevrolet |
| 36 | 15 | Cody Ware | Rick Ware Racing | Ford |
Official qualifying results

== Race ==
=== Race results ===
==== Stage results ====
Stage One Laps: 45

| Pos | No | Driver | Team | Manufacturer | Points |
|---|---|---|---|---|---|
| 1 | 12 | Ryan Blaney | Team Penske | Ford | 10 |
| 2 | 9 | Chase Elliott | Hendrick Motorsports | Chevrolet | 9 |
| 3 | 24 | William Byron | Hendrick Motorsports | Chevrolet | 8 |
| 4 | 23 | Bubba Wallace | 23XI Racing | Toyota | 7 |
| 5 | 17 | Chris Buescher | RFK Racing | Ford | 6 |
| 6 | 8 | Kyle Busch | Richard Childress Racing | Chevrolet | 5 |
| 7 | 6 | Brad Keselowski | RFK Racing | Ford | 4 |
| 8 | 19 | Martin Truex Jr. | Joe Gibbs Racing | Toyota | 3 |
| 9 | 48 | Alex Bowman | Hendrick Motorsports | Chevrolet | 2 |
| 10 | 1 | Ross Chastain | Trackhouse Racing | Chevrolet | 1 |
Official stage one results

Stage Two Laps: 75

| Pos | No | Driver | Team | Manufacturer | Points |
|---|---|---|---|---|---|
| 1 | 8 | Kyle Busch | Richard Childress Racing | Chevrolet | 10 |
| 2 | 1 | Ross Chastain | Trackhouse Racing | Chevrolet | 9 |
| 3 | 54 | Ty Gibbs | Joe Gibbs Racing | Toyota | 8 |
| 4 | 24 | William Byron | Hendrick Motorsports | Chevrolet | 7 |
| 5 | 3 | Austin Dillon | Richard Childress Racing | Chevrolet | 6 |
| 6 | 6 | Brad Keselowski | RFK Racing | Ford | 5 |
| 7 | 19 | Martin Truex Jr. | Joe Gibbs Racing | Toyota | 4 |
| 8 | 43 | Erik Jones | Legacy Motor Club | Toyota | 3 |
| 9 | 15 | Cody Ware | Rick Ware Racing | Ford | 2 |
| 10 | 12 | Ryan Blaney | Team Penske | Ford | 1 |
Official stage two results

=== Final Stage results ===
Stage Three Laps: 80

| Pos | Grid | No | Driver | Team | Manufacturer | Laps | Points |
|---|---|---|---|---|---|---|---|
| 1 | 2 | 45 | Tyler Reddick | 23XI Racing | Toyota | 206 | 40 |
| 2 | 9 | 24 | William Byron | Hendrick Motorsports | Chevrolet | 206 | 50 |
| 3 | 19 | 54 | Ty Gibbs | Joe Gibbs Racing | Toyota | 206 | 42 |
| 4 | 13 | 8 | Kyle Busch | Richard Childress Racing | Chevrolet | 206 | 48 |
| 5 | 15 | 6 | Brad Keselowski | RFK Racing | Ford | 206 | 41 |
| 6 | 18 | 17 | Chris Buescher | RFK Racing | Ford | 206 | 37 |
| 7 | 27 | 71 | Zane Smith (R) | Spire Motorsports | Chevrolet | 206 | 30 |
| 8 | 12 | 99 | Daniel Suárez | Trackhouse Racing | Chevrolet | 206 | 29 |
| 9 | 1 | 11 | Denny Hamlin | Joe Gibbs Racing | Toyota | 206 | 28 |
| 10 | 11 | 77 | Carson Hocevar (R) | Spire Motorsports | Chevrolet | 206 | 27 |
| 11 | 26 | 41 | Ryan Preece | Stewart-Haas Racing | Ford | 206 | 26 |
| 12 | 25 | 10 | Noah Gragson | Stewart-Haas Racing | Ford | 206 | 25 |
| 13 | 30 | 47 | Ricky Stenhouse Jr. | JTG Daugherty Racing | Chevrolet | 206 | 24 |
| 14 | 34 | 21 | Harrison Burton | Wood Brothers Racing | Ford | 206 | 23 |
| 15 | 6 | 9 | Chase Elliott | Hendrick Motorsports | Chevrolet | 206 | 31 |
| 16 | 28 | 43 | Erik Jones | Legacy Motor Club | Toyota | 206 | 24 |
| 17 | 10 | 3 | Austin Dillon | Richard Childress Racing | Chevrolet | 206 | 26 |
| 18 | 8 | 12 | Ryan Blaney | Team Penske | Ford | 206 | 30 |
| 19 | 17 | 34 | Michael McDowell | Front Row Motorsports | Chevrolet | 206 | 18 |
| 20 | 29 | 51 | Justin Haley | Rick Ware Racing | Ford | 206 | 17 |
| 21 | 36 | 15 | Cody Ware | Rick Ware Racing | Ford | 206 | 18 |
| 22 | 16 | 4 | Josh Berry (R) | Stewart-Haas Racing | Ford | 206 | 15 |
| 23 | 32 | 31 | Daniel Hemric | Kaulig Racing | Chevrolet | 206 | 14 |
| 24 | 24 | 19 | Martin Truex Jr. | Joe Gibbs Racing | Toyota | 206 | 20 |
| 25 | 7 | 1 | Ross Chastain | Trackhouse Racing | Chevrolet | 205 | 22 |
| 26 | 5 | 23 | Bubba Wallace | 23XI Racing | Toyota | 205 | 18 |
| 27 | 22 | 48 | Alex Bowman | Hendrick Motorsports | Chevrolet | 205 | 12 |
| 28 | 23 | 2 | Austin Cindric | Team Penske | Ford | 204 | 9 |
| 29 | 33 | 42 | John Hunter Nemechek | Legacy Motor Club | Toyota | 202 | 8 |
| 30 | 35 | 16 | A. J. Allmendinger (i) | Kaulig Racing | Chevrolet | 200 | 0 |
| 31 | 21 | 14 | Chase Briscoe | Stewart-Haas Racing | Ford | 157 | 6 |
| 32 | 31 | 7 | Corey LaJoie | Spire Motorsports | Chevrolet | 135 | 5 |
| 33 | 14 | 22 | Joey Logano | Team Penske | Ford | 117 | 4 |
| 34 | 4 | 5 | Kyle Larson | Hendrick Motorsports | Chevrolet | 115 | 3 |
| 35 | 3 | 20 | Christopher Bell | Joe Gibbs Racing | Toyota | 115 | 2 |
| 36 | 20 | 38 | Todd Gilliland | Front Row Motorsports | Ford | 114 | 1 |
Official race results

=== Race statistics ===
- Lead changes: 26 among 16 different drivers
- Cautions/Laps: 7 for 41 laps.
- Red flags: 1 for 17 hours, 15 minutes, and 18 seconds
- Time of race: 3 hours, 2 minutes, and 12 seconds
- Average speed: 135.675 miles per hour (218.348 km/h)

== Media ==
=== Television ===
USA covered the race on the television side. Rick Allen, Jeff Burton, and Steve Letarte called the race from the broadcast booth. Dave Burns, Parker Kligerman, and Marty Snider handled the pit road duties from pit lane. This would be the last Cup Series race that Allen would call, as he was replaced by Leigh Diffey for the rest of the year.

USA
| Booth announcers | Pit reporters |
|---|---|
| Lap-by-lap: Rick Allen; Color-commentator: Jeff Burton; Color-commentator: Steve Letarte | Dave Burns; Parker Kligerman; Marty Snider |

=== Radio ===
Radio coverage of the race was broadcast by Motor Racing Network (MRN) and simulcast on Sirius XM NASCAR Radio. Alex Hayden, Jeff Striegle and Todd Gordon called the race in the booth while the field was racing on the front stretch. Dave Moody called the race from a billboard outside of turn 2 when the field is racing through turns 1 and 2. Mike Bagley called the race from a platform outside of turn 3 when the field races through turns 3 and 4. Steve Post, Brienne Pedigo and Chris Wilner worked pit road for the radio side.

MRN
| Booth announcers | Turn announcers | Pit reporters |
|---|---|---|
| Lead announcer: Alex Hayden; Announcer: Jeff Striegle; Announcer: Todd Gordon | Turns 1 & 2: Dave Moody; Turns 3 & 4: Mike Bagley | Steve Post; Brienne Pedigo; Chris Wilner |

== Standings after the race ==
Drivers' Championship standings

| | Pos | Driver | Points |
|---|---|---|---|
| 1 | 1 | Tyler Reddick | 814 |
| 1 | 2 | Chase Elliott | 804 (–10) |
| 2 | 3 | Kyle Larson | 782 (–32) |
| 1 | 4 | Ryan Blaney | 732 (–82) |
| | 5 | William Byron | 728 (–86) |
| 2 | 6 | Denny Hamlin | 711 (–103) |
| 1 | 7 | Christopher Bell | 703 (–111) |
| | 8 | Martin Truex Jr. | 682 (–132) |
| | 9 | Brad Keselowski | 677 (–137) |
| 1 | 10 | Ty Gibbs | 644 (–170) |
| 1 | 11 | Alex Bowman | 627 (–187) |
| 1 | 12 | Chris Buescher | 621 (–193) |
| 1 | 13 | Ross Chastain | 606 (–208) |
| 2 | 14 | Bubba Wallace | 605 (–209) |
| | 15 | Joey Logano | 561 (–253) |
| | 16 | Daniel Suárez | 526 (–288) |
Official driver's standings

Manufacturers' Championship standings

| Pos | Manufacturer | Points |
|---|---|---|
| 1 | Chevrolet | 874 |
| 2 | Toyota | 861 (–13) |
| 3 | Ford | 828 (–46) |

- Note: Only the first 16 positions are included for the driver standings.
- . – Driver has clinched a position in the NASCAR Cup Series playoffs.

| Previous race: 2024 Cook Out 400 | NASCAR Cup Series; 2024 season | Next race: 2024 Coke Zero Sugar 400 |
