= 2024 Brickyard 400 =

2024 Brickyard 400 presented by PPG
Race details
- Race 22 of 36 in the 2024 NASCAR Cup Series
- Date: July 21, 2024
- Location: Indianapolis Motor Speedway in Speedway, Indiana
- Course: Permanent racing facility
- Course length: 2.5 miles (4 km)
- Distance: 167 laps, 417.5 mi (668 km)
- Scheduled distance: 160 laps, 400 mi (640 km)
- Average speed: 119.77 miles per hour (192.75 km/h)

Pole position
Driver	Tyler Reddick	23XI Racing
- Time: 49.469

Most laps led
Driver	Tyler Reddick	23XI Racing
- Laps: 41

Winner
No. 5	Kyle Larson	Hendrick Motorsports

Television in the United States
- Network: NBC/USA
- Announcers: Rick Allen, Jeff Burton and Steve Letarte
- Nielsen ratings: 2.1 (3.63 million)

Radio in the United States
- Radio: PRN/IMS Radio
- Booth announcers: Doug Rice, Mark Jaynes and Jeff Hammond
- Turn announcers: Nick Yeoman (Turn 1), Michael Young (Turn 2), Doug Turnbull (Turn 3) and Chris Denari (Turn 4)

The 2024 Brickyard 400 presented by PPG was a NASCAR Cup Series race held on July 21, 2024, at Indianapolis Motor Speedway in Speedway, Indiana. Contested over 167 laps—extended from 160 laps due to an overtime finish, on the 2.5-mile (4.0 km) oval, it was the 22nd race of the 2024 NASCAR Cup Series season. It was the 31st annual running of NASCAR at Indianapolis, and first oval race here since 2020, making it the 28th running of the Brickyard 400 event. Kyle Larson won the race. Tyler Reddick finished 2nd, and Ryan Blaney finished 3rd. Christopher Bell and Bubba Wallace rounded out the top five, and Todd Gilliland, Austin Cindric, Daniel Suárez, Noah Gragson, and Chase Elliott rounded out the top ten.

== Report ==
=== Background ===
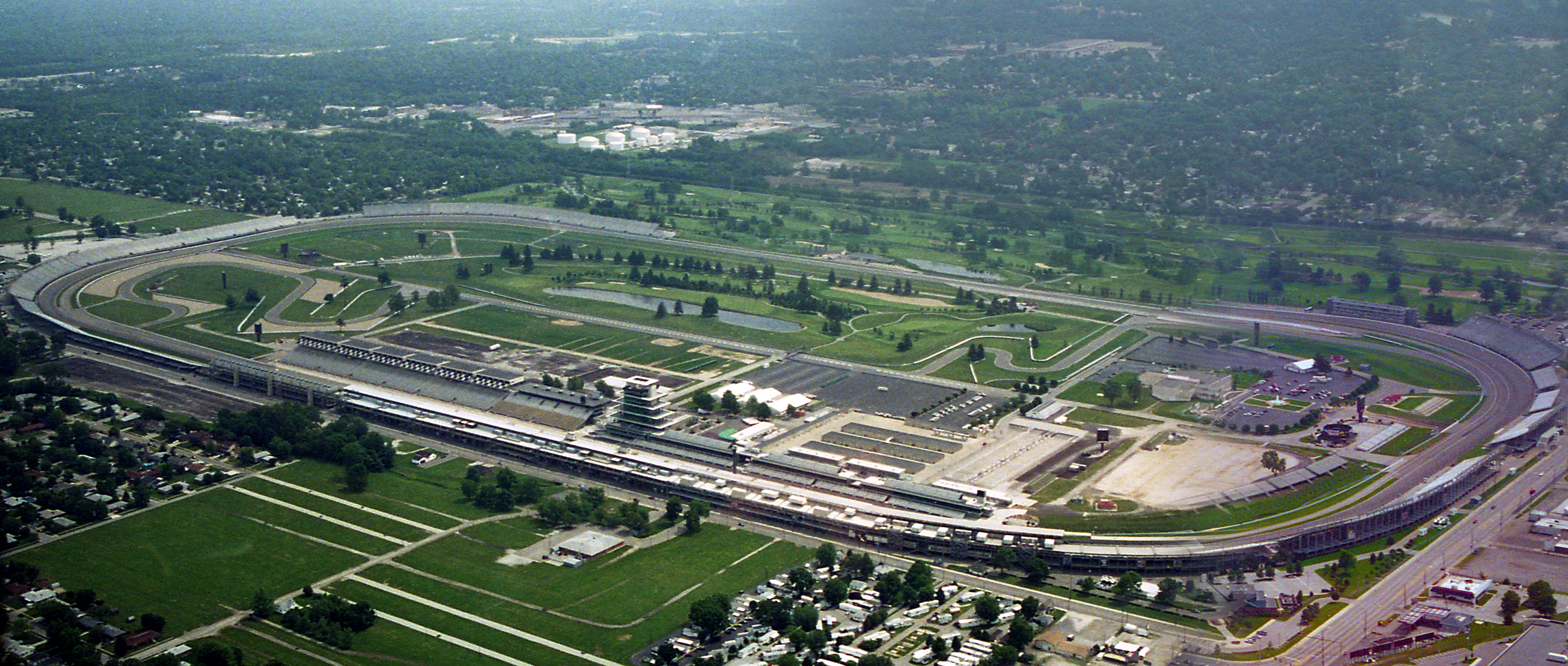
Indianapolis Motor Speedway, the track where the race was held.

The Indianapolis Motor Speedway, located in Speedway, Indiana, (an enclave suburb of Indianapolis) in the United States, is the home of the Indianapolis 500 and the Brickyard 400. It is located on the corner of 16th Street and Georgetown Road, approximately six miles (10 km) west of Downtown Indianapolis.

Constructed in 1909, it is the original speedway, the first racing facility so named. It has a permanent seating capacity estimated at 235,000 with infield seating raising capacity to an approximate 400,000. It is the highest-capacity sports venue in the world.

Considered relatively flat by American standards, the track is a 2.5-mile (4.0 km), nearly rectangular oval with dimensions that have remained essentially unchanged since its inception: four 0.25-mile (0.40 km) turns, two 0.625-mile-long (1.006 km) straightaways between the fourth and first turns and the second and third turns, and two .125-mile (0.201 km) short straightaways – termed "short chutes" – between the first and second, and third and fourth turns.

This was the first NASCAR race on the oval layout since 2020, as the Verizon 200 at the Brickyard was held on the GP layout from 2021 to 2023.

Following this race, NASCAR took a 2-week break, due to NBC's coverage of the 2024 Summer Olympics.

==== Entry list ====
- (R) denotes rookie driver.
- (i) denotes driver who is ineligible for series driver points.
- (W) denotes past winner of event

No.	Driver	Team	Manufacturer
1	Ross Chastain	Trackhouse Racing	Chevrolet
2	Austin Cindric	Team Penske	Ford
3	Austin Dillon	Richard Childress Racing	Chevrolet
4	Josh Berry (R)	Stewart-Haas Racing	Ford
5	Kyle Larson	Hendrick Motorsports	Chevrolet
6	Brad Keselowski (W)	RFK Racing	Ford
7	Corey LaJoie	Spire Motorsports	Chevrolet
8	Kyle Busch (W)	Richard Childress Racing	Chevrolet
9	Chase Elliott	Hendrick Motorsports	Chevrolet
10	Noah Gragson	Stewart-Haas Racing	Ford
11	Denny Hamlin	Joe Gibbs Racing	Toyota
12	Ryan Blaney	Team Penske	Ford
14	Chase Briscoe	Stewart-Haas Racing	Ford
15	Cody Ware	Rick Ware Racing	Ford
16	A. J. Allmendinger (i)	Kaulig Racing	Chevrolet
17	Chris Buescher	RFK Racing	Ford
19	Martin Truex Jr.	Joe Gibbs Racing	Toyota
20	Christopher Bell	Joe Gibbs Racing	Toyota
21	Harrison Burton	Wood Brothers Racing	Ford
22	Joey Logano	Team Penske	Ford
23	Bubba Wallace	23XI Racing	Toyota
24	William Byron	Hendrick Motorsports	Chevrolet
31	Daniel Hemric	Kaulig Racing	Chevrolet
33	Ty Dillon (i)	Richard Childress Racing	Chevrolet
34	Michael McDowell	Front Row Motorsports	Ford
38	Todd Gilliland	Front Row Motorsports	Ford
41	Ryan Preece	Stewart-Haas Racing	Ford
42	John Hunter Nemechek	Legacy Motor Club	Toyota
43	Erik Jones	Legacy Motor Club	Toyota
45	Tyler Reddick	23XI Racing	Toyota
47	Ricky Stenhouse Jr.	JTG Daugherty Racing	Chevrolet
48	Alex Bowman	Hendrick Motorsports	Chevrolet
51	Justin Haley	Rick Ware Racing	Ford
54	Ty Gibbs	Joe Gibbs Racing	Toyota
66	B. J. McLeod (i)	Power Source	Ford
71	Zane Smith (R)	Spire Motorsports	Chevrolet
77	Carson Hocevar (R)	Spire Motorsports	Chevrolet
84	Jimmie Johnson (W)	Legacy Motor Club	Toyota
99	Daniel Suárez	Trackhouse Racing	Chevrolet
Official entry list

== Practice ==
Tyler Reddick was the fastest in the practice session with a time of 49.293 seconds and a speed of 182.582 mph (293.837 km/h).

=== Practice results ===
Pos	No.	Driver	Team	Manufacturer	Time	Speed
1	45	Tyler Reddick	23XI Racing	Toyota	49.293	182.582
2	12	Ryan Blaney	Team Penske	Ford	49.470	181.928
3	11	Denny Hamlin	Joe Gibbs Racing	Toyota	49.570	181.561
Official practice results

== Qualifying ==
Tyler Reddick scored the pole for the race with a time of 49.469 and a speed of 181.932 mph (292.791 km/h).

=== Qualifying results ===
Pos	No.	Driver	Team	Manufacturer	R1	R2
1	45	Tyler Reddick	23XI Racing	Toyota	49.278	49.469
2	11	Denny Hamlin	Joe Gibbs Racing	Toyota	49.535	49.504
3	9	Chase Elliott	Hendrick Motorsports	Chevrolet	49.334	49.504
4	24	William Byron	Hendrick Motorsports	Chevrolet	49.786	49.957
5	5	Kyle Larson	Hendrick Motorsports	Chevrolet	49.552	49.642
6	54	Ty Gibbs	Joe Gibbs Racing	Toyota	49.549	49.988
7	12	Ryan Blaney	Team Penske	Ford	49.709	50.042
8	34	Michael McDowell	Front Row Motorsports	Ford	49.549	50.308
9	47	Ricky Stenhouse Jr.	JTG Daugherty Racing	Chevrolet	49.690	51.766
10	42	John Hunter Nemechek	Legacy Motor Club	Toyota	49.828	50.431
11	3	Austin Dillon	Richard Childress Racing	Chevrolet	49.748	—
12	22	Joey Logano	Team Penske	Ford	49.925	—
13	48	Alex Bowman	Hendrick Motorsports	Chevrolet	49.785	—
14	19	Martin Truex Jr.	Joe Gibbs Racing	Toyota	49.979	—
15	16	A. J. Allmendinger (i)	Kaulig Racing	Chevrolet	49.822	—
16	21	Harrison Burton	Wood Brothers Racing	Ford	50.015	—
17	23	Bubba Wallace	23XI Racing	Toyota	49.836	—
18	20	Christopher Bell	Joe Gibbs Racing	Toyota	50.067	—
19	7	Corey LaJoie	Spire Motorsports	Chevrolet	49.868	—
20	14	Chase Briscoe	Stewart-Haas Racing	Ford	50.074	—
21	10	Noah Gragson	Stewart-Haas Racing	Ford	49.956	—
22	33	Ty Dillon (i)	Richard Childress Racing	Chevrolet	50.092	—
23	17	Chris Buescher	RFK Racing	Ford	49.993	—
24	38	Todd Gilliland	Front Row Motorsports	Ford	50.103	—
25	99	Daniel Suárez	Trackhouse Racing	Chevrolet	50.233	—
26	6	Brad Keselowski	RFK Racing	Ford	50.252	—
27	71	Zane Smith (R)	Spire Motorsports	Chevrolet	50.290	—
28	1	Ross Chastain	Trackhouse Racing	Chevrolet	50.287	—
29	43	Erik Jones	Legacy Motor Club	Toyota	50.331	—
30	77	Carson Hocevar (R)	Spire Motorsports	Chevrolet	50.434	—
31	41	Ryan Preece	Stewart-Haas Racing	Ford	50.360	—
32	31	Daniel Hemric	Kaulig Racing	Chevrolet	50.458	—
33	84	Jimmie Johnson	Legacy Motor Club	Toyota	50.435	—
34	8	Kyle Busch	Richard Childress Racing	Chevrolet	50.466	—
35	51	Justin Haley	Rick Ware Racing	Ford	50.702	—
36	15	Cody Ware	Rick Ware Racing	Ford	50.923	—
37	4	Josh Berry (R)	Stewart-Haas Racing	Ford	50.969	—
38	2	Austin Cindric	Team Penske	Ford	55.869	—
39	66	B. J. McLeod (i)	Power Source	Ford	53.012	—
Official qualifying results

== Race ==
=== Race results ===
==== Stage results ====
Stage One Laps: 50

Pos	No	Driver	Team	Manufacturer	Points
1	11	Denny Hamlin	Joe Gibbs Racing	Toyota	10
2	5	Kyle Larson	Hendrick Motorsports	Chevrolet	9
3	12	Ryan Blaney	Team Penske	Ford	8
4	24	William Byron	Hendrick Motorsports	Chevrolet	7
5	45	Tyler Reddick	23XI Racing	Toyota	6
6	34	Michael McDowell	Front Row Motorsports	Ford	5
7	48	Alex Bowman	Hendrick Motorsports	Chevrolet	4
8	54	Ty Gibbs	Joe Gibbs Racing	Toyota	3
9	47	Ricky Stenhouse Jr.	JTG Daugherty Racing	Chevrolet	2
10	10	Noah Gragson	Stewart-Haas Racing	Ford	1
Official stage one results

Stage Two Laps: 50

Pos	No	Driver	Team	Manufacturer	Points
1	23	Bubba Wallace	23XI Racing	Toyota	10
2	9	Chase Elliott	Hendrick Motorsports	Chevrolet	9
3	11	Denny Hamlin	Joe Gibbs Racing	Toyota	8
4	12	Ryan Blaney	Team Penske	Ford	7
5	42	John Hunter Nemechek	Legacy Motor Club	Toyota	6
6	45	Tyler Reddick	23XI Racing	Toyota	5
7	47	Ricky Stenhouse Jr.	JTG Daugherty Racing	Chevrolet	4
8	19	Martin Truex Jr.	Joe Gibbs Racing	Toyota	3
9	20	Christopher Bell	Joe Gibbs Racing	Toyota	2
10	14	Chase Briscoe	Stewart-Haas Racing	Ford	1
Official stage two results

=== Final Stage results ===
On the overtime restart, leader Brad Keselowski ran out of fuel and had to pit. As a result, Ryan Blaney (now designated as the restart's control car) and Kyle Larson led the overtime restart. On the restart, Larson immediately outpaced Blaney to the lead; although NASCAR ruled Larson did not jump the restart, allegations continued to propel that Larson did so. Further restart controversy continued when race officials did not throw a caution for Ryan Preece's stalled car following another overtime restart.

Stage Three Laps: 60

Pos	Grid	No	Driver	Team	Manufacturer	Laps	Points
1	5	5	Kyle Larson	Hendrick Motorsports	Chevrolet	167	49
2	1	45	Tyler Reddick	23XI Racing	Toyota	167	46
3	7	12	Ryan Blaney	Team Penske	Ford	167	49
4	18	20	Christopher Bell	Joe Gibbs Racing	Toyota	167	35
5	17	23	Bubba Wallace	23XI Racing	Toyota	167	42
6	24	38	Todd Gilliland	Front Row Motorsports	Ford	167	31
7	38	2	Austin Cindric	Team Penske	Ford	167	30
8	25	99	Daniel Suárez	Trackhouse Racing	Chevrolet	167	29
9	21	10	Noah Gragson	Stewart-Haas Racing	Ford	167	29
10	3	9	Chase Elliott	Hendrick Motorsports	Chevrolet	167	36
11	9	47	Ricky Stenhouse Jr.	JTG Daugherty Racing	Chevrolet	167	32
12	30	77	Carson Hocevar (R)	Spire Motorsports	Chevrolet	167	25
13	11	3	Austin Dillon	Richard Childress Racing	Chevrolet	167	24
14	19	7	Corey LaJoie	Spire Motorsports	Chevrolet	167	23
15	28	1	Ross Chastain	Trackhouse Racing	Chevrolet	167	22
16	8	34	Michael McDowell	Front Row Motorsports	Ford	167	26
17	27	71	Zane Smith (R)	Spire Motorsports	Chevrolet	167	20
18	36	15	Cody Ware	Rick Ware Racing	Ford	167	19
19	22	33	Ty Dillon (i)	Richard Childress Racing	Chevrolet	167	0
20	35	51	Justin Haley	Rick Ware Racing	Ford	167	17
21	26	6	Brad Keselowski	RFK Racing	Ford	167	16
22	23	17	Chris Buescher	RFK Racing	Ford	167	15
23	6	54	Ty Gibbs	Joe Gibbs Racing	Toyota	167	17
24	20	14	Chase Briscoe	Stewart-Haas Racing	Ford	167	14
25	34	8	Kyle Busch	Richard Childress Racing	Chevrolet	166	12
26	31	41	Ryan Preece	Stewart-Haas Racing	Ford	165	11
27	14	19	Martin Truex Jr.	Joe Gibbs Racing	Toyota	165	13
28	29	43	Erik Jones	Legacy Motor Club	Toyota	165	9
29	10	42	John Hunter Nemechek	Legacy Motor Club	Toyota	161	14
30	32	31	Daniel Hemric	Kaulig Racing	Chevrolet	161	7
31	13	48	Alex Bowman	Hendrick Motorsports	Chevrolet	161	10
32	2	11	Denny Hamlin	Joe Gibbs Racing	Toyota	161	23
33	33	84	Jimmie Johnson	Legacy Motor Club	Toyota	110	4
34	12	22	Joey Logano	Team Penske	Ford	109	3
35	37	4	Josh Berry (R)	Stewart-Haas Racing	Ford	104	2
36	16	21	Harrison Burton	Wood Brothers Racing	Ford	74	1
37	15	16	A. J. Allmendinger (i)	Kaulig Racing	Chevrolet	74	0
38	4	24	William Byron	Hendrick Motorsports	Chevrolet	73	8
39	39	66	B. J. McLeod (i)	Power Source	Ford	15	0
Official race results

=== Race statistics ===
- Lead changes: 18 among 13 different drivers
- Cautions/Laps: 10 for 32 laps
- Red flags: 1 for 17 minutes and 8 seconds
- Time of race: 3 hours, 29 minutes, and 9 seconds
- Average speed: 119.77 miles per hour (192.75 km/h)

== Media ==
=== Television ===
NBC Sports covered the race on the television side. The first few laps of the race was switched to USA due to the withdrawal of Joe Biden from the 2024 US presidential election but returned to NBC. Rick Allen, Jeff Burton, and Steve Letarte called the race from the broadcast booth. Dave Burns, Kim Coon, and Marty Snider handled the pit road duties from pit lane.

NBC
Booth announcers	Pit reporters
Lap-by-lap: Rick Allen; Color-commentator: Jeff Burton; Color-commentator: Steve Letarte	Dave Burns; Kim Coon; Marty Snider

=== Radio ===
Indianapolis Motor Speedway Radio Network and the Performance Racing Network jointly co-produce the radio broadcast for the race, which was simulcast on Sirius XM NASCAR Radio, and aired on IMS or PRN stations, depending on contractual obligations. The lead announcers and two pit reporters were PRN staff, while the turns announcers and two pit reporters are from IMS.

PRN/IMS Radio
Booth announcers	Turn announcers	Pit reporters
Lead announcer: Doug Rice; Announcer: Mark Jaynes; Announcer: Jeff Hammond	Turn 1: Nick Yeoman; Turn 2: Michael Young; Turn 3: Doug Turnbull; Turn 4: Chris Denari	Rob Blackman; Brett McMillan; Rich Nye; Leslie Gudel

== Standings after the race ==
Drivers' Championship standings

	Pos	Driver	Points
1	1	Kyle Larson	749
1	2	Chase Elliott	739 (–10)
	3	Tyler Reddick	734 (–15)
	4	Denny Hamlin	706 (–43)
2	5	Ryan Blaney	676 (–73)
1	6	William Byron	654 (–95)
1	7	Martin Truex Jr.	653 (–96)
	8	Christopher Bell	651 (–98)
	9	Brad Keselowski	615 (–134)
	10	Alex Bowman	606 (–143)
	11	Ty Gibbs	587 (–162)
	12	Chris Buescher	562 (–187)
	13	Ross Chastain	552 (–197)
1	14	Bubba Wallace	545 (–204)
1	15	Joey Logano	525 (–224)
	16	Chase Briscoe	469 (–280)
Official driver's standings

Manufacturers' Championship standings

Pos	Manufacturer	Points
1	Chevrolet	799
2	Toyota	786 (–13)
3	Ford	770 (–29)

- Note: Only the first 16 positions are included for the driver standings.
- . – Driver has clinched a position in the NASCAR Cup Series playoffs.

Previous race: 2024 The Great American Getaway 400	NASCAR Cup Series; 2024 season	Next race: 2024 Cook Out 400
