= Justin Carroll =

American racing driver (born 1995)

- Born: Justin Scott Carroll; December 8, 1995 (age 30); Williamsburg, Virginia, U.S.

NASCAR O'Reilly Auto Parts Series career
- 1 race run over 1 year
- 2026 position: 91st
- Best finish: 91st (2026)
- First race: 2026 National Debt Relief 250 (Martinsville)
Wins	Top tens	Poles
0	0	0

NASCAR FedEx Freight Truck Series career
- 19 races run over 4 years
- Truck no., team: No. 90 (TC Motorsports)
- 2026 position: 71st
- Best finish: 35th (2025)
- First race: 2023 Heart of America 200 (Kansas)
- Last race: 2026 Black's Tire 200 (Martinsville)
Wins	Top tens	Poles
0	0	0

ARCA Menards Series career
- 6 races run over 3 years
- Best finish: 34th (2020)
- First race: 2020 Calypso Lemonade 200 (IRP)
- Last race: 2022 Bush's Beans 200 (Bristol)
Wins	Top tens	Poles
0	1	0

ARCA Menards Series East career
- 21 races run over 7 years
- Best finish: 6th (2020)
- First race: 2015 Visit Hampton VA 150 (Langley)
- Last race: 2022 Bush's Beans 200 (Bristol)
Wins	Top tens	Poles
0	11	0
- Statistics up to date as of November 7, 2026.

Justin Scott Carroll (born December 8, 1995) is an American professional stock car racing driver. He competes part-time in the NASCAR Truck Series, driving the No. 90 Toyota Tundra TRD Pro for his family-owned team, TC Motorsports.

== Racing career ==
=== Early career ===
In 2014, Carroll would attempt a challenge to earn a NASCAR K&N Pro Series East ride with Michael Waltrip Racing.

=== ARCA Menards Series East ===
In 2015, Carroll, with a partnership with team Precision Performance Motorsports, was able to make his debut in the NASCAR K&N Pro Series East.

In 2018, Carroll would suffer his first retirement due to a handling issue.

=== NASCAR Craftsman Truck Series ===
In 2020, Carroll announced that he was looking towards racing in the NASCAR Gander RV & Outdoors Truck Series. In 2021, Carroll announced plans to race part-time during the 2021 NASCAR Camping World Truck Series, but couldn't due to the lack of qualifying.

On March 9, 2022, Carroll announced plans to race in three races during the 2022 NASCAR Camping World Truck Series season, with more races dependent on sponsorship. He failed to qualify for all five of his attempts. His closest call at making a race was at Bristol, where he missed the race by just 0.145 seconds.

On August 31, 2022, Carroll stated in an interview with Christian Koelle from Kickin' the Tires that he and his team would return to the Truck and ARCA Series part-time again in 2023.

== Personal life ==
His father, Terry Carroll, owns the team Justin drives for, TC Motorsports. He graduated from Warhill High School in Williamsburg, Virginia.

When he has competed in the CARS Tour, Carroll has competed against another Justin Carroll, who is from North Carolina. They are not the same person. Throughout his career, this Justin Carroll has often been designated on NASCAR entry lists and race results as "Justin S. Carroll" to avoid confusion with the other Justin Carroll.

== Motorsports career results ==
=== Stock car career summary ===
Season	Series	Team	Races	Wins	Top 5	Top 10	Points	Position
2015	NASCAR K&N Pro Series East	TC Motorsports	2	0	0	1	55	39th
2017	NASCAR K&N Pro Series East	TC Motorsports	1	0	0	1	34	51st
2018	NASCAR K&N Pro Series East	TC Motorsports	3	0	1	2	109	24th
2019	CARS Late Model Stock Car Tour	TC Motorsports	3	0	1	1	60	28th
2019	NASCAR K&N Pro Series East	TC Motorsports	5	0	0	3	167	14th
2020	CARS Late Model Stock Car Tour	TC Motorsports	1	0	0	0	9	57th
2020	ARCA Menards Series East	TC Motorsports	6	0	0	3	294	6th
2020	ARCA Menards Series	TC Motorsports	3	0	0	1	98	34th
2021	CARS Late Model Stock Car Tour	TC Motorsports	1	0	0	0	20	45th
2021	ARCA Menards Series East	TC Motorsports	3	0	1	1	94	21st
2021	ARCA Menards Series	TC Motorsports	2	0	0	0	59	63rd
2022	ARCA Menards Series East	TC Motorsports	1	0	0	0	18	57th
2022	ARCA Menards Series	TC Motorsports	1	0	0	0	18	119th
2022	NASCAR Camping World Truck Series	TC Motorsports	0	0	0	0	0	107th
2023	CARS Late Model Stock Car Tour	TC Motorsports	1	0	0	0	20	58th
2023	NASCAR Craftsman Truck Series	TC Motorsports	4	0	0	0	31	47th
2024	NASCAR Craftsman Truck Series	TC Motorsports	6	0	0	0	40	43rd
2025	CARS Late Model Stock Car Tour	TC Motorsports	1	0	0	0	26	72nd
2025	NASCAR Craftsman Truck Series	TC Motorsports	6	0	0	0	63	35th
2026	NASCAR Craftsman Truck Series	TC Motorsports	3	0	0	0	18	71st
2026	NASCAR O'Reilly Auto Parts Series	Joey Gase Motorsports with Scott Osteen	1	0	0	0	0	NC†

^{†} As Carroll was a guest driver, he was ineligible for championship points.

=== NASCAR ===
(key) (Bold – Pole position awarded by qualifying time. Italics – Pole position earned by points standings or practice time. * – Most laps led.)

==== O'Reilly Auto Parts Series ====
NASCAR O'Reilly Auto Parts Series results
Year	Team	No.	Make	1	2	3	4	5	6	7	8	9	10	11	12	13	14	15	16	17	18	19	20	21	22	23	24	25	26	27	28	29	30	31	32	33	NOAPSC	Pts	Ref
2026	Joey Gase Motorsports with Scott Osteen	35	Chevy	DAY	ATL	COA	PHO	LVS	DAR	MAR; DNQ	CAR	BRI	KAN	TAL	TEX	GLN	DOV	CLT	NSH	POC	COR	SON	CHI	ATL	IND	IOW	DAY	DAR	GTW	BRI	LVS	CLT	PHO	TAL	MAR; 26	HOM	91st	0^{1}	

==== Craftsman Truck Series ====
NASCAR Craftsman Truck Series results
Year	Team	No.	Make	1	2	3	4	5	6	7	8	9	10	11	12	13	14	15	16	17	18	19	20	21	22	23	24	25	NCTC	Pts	Ref
2022	TC Motorsports	90	Toyota	DAY	LVS	ATL	COA	MAR; DNQ	BRD	DAR	KAN	TEX	CLT	GTW; DNQ	SON	KNX	NSH; DNQ	MOH	POC	IRP	RCH; DNQ	KAN	BRI; DNQ	TAL	HOM	PHO			107th	—	
2023	TC Motorsports	90	Toyota	DAY	LVS	ATL	COA	TEX	BRD	MAR; DNQ	KAN; 23	DAR	NWS	CLT; 34	GTW	NSH; Wth	MOH	POC	RCH; 31	IRP	MLW	KAN; 29	BRI; DNQ	TAL	HOM	PHO			47th	31	
2024	TC Motorsports	90	Toyota	DAY	ATL	LVS	BRI; 36	COA	MAR; 32	TEX	KAN	DAR	NWS; Wth	CLT; DNQ	GTW	NSH; DNQ	POC; 28	IRP	RCH; 27	MLW; 34	BRI; DNQ	KAN	TAL	HOM	MAR; 25	PHO			43rd	40	
2025	TC Motorsports	90	Chevy	DAY; DNQ																									35th	63	
2025	TC Motorsports	90	Toyota		ATL; 28	LVS; Wth	HOM	MAR; 18	BRI; 26	CAR; 34	TEX	KAN	NWS; Wth	CLT; 33	NSH	MCH	POC	LRP	IRP	GLN	RCH	DAR	BRI	NHA	ROV	TAL	MAR; 20	PHO	35th	63	
2026	TC Motorsports	90	Chevy	DAY; DNQ																									71st	18	
2026	TC Motorsports	90	Toyota		ATL; 35	STP	DAR; 26	CAR; DNQ	BRI; Wth	TEX	GLN	DOV	CLT; Wth	NSH	MCH; Wth	COR	LRP	NWS	IRP; DNQ	RCH; DNQ	NHA	BRI; DNQ	KAN	CLT	PHO	TAL	MAR; 32	HOM	71st	18	

^{*} Season still in progress
^{1} Ineligible for series points

=== ARCA Menards Series ===
(key) (Bold – Pole position awarded by qualifying time. Italics – Pole position earned by points standings or practice time. * – Most laps led.)

ARCA Menards Series results
Year	Team	No.	Make	1	2	3	4	5	6	7	8	9	10	11	12	13	14	15	16	17	18	19	20	AMSC	Pts	Ref
2020	TC Motorsports	91	Toyota	DAY	PHO	TAL	POC	IRP; 13	KEN	IOW	KAN	TOL	TOL	MCH	DRC	GTW	L44	TOL; 11	BRI; 10	WIN	MEM	ISF	KAN	34th	98	
2021	TC Motorsports	91	Toyota	DAY	PHO	TAL	KAN; 13	TOL	CLT	MOH	POC	ELK	BLN	IOW	WIN	GLN	MCH	ISF	MLW	DSF	BRI; 16	SLM	KAN	63rd	59	
2022	TC Motorsports	91	Toyota	DAY	PHO	TAL	KAN	CLT	IOW	BLN	ELK	MOH	POC	IRP	MCH	GLN	ISF	MLW	DSF	KAN	BRI; 26	SLM	TOL	119th	18	

==== ARCA Menards Series East ====
ARCA Menards Series East results
Year	Team	No.	Make	1	2	3	4	5	6	7	8	9	10	11	12	13	14	AMSEC	Pts	Ref
2015	TC Motorsports	91	Toyota	NSM	GRE	BRI	IOW	BGS	LGY; 7	COL	NHA	IOW	GLN	MOT	VIR	RCH; 26	DOV	39th	55	
2017	TC Motorsports	91	Toyota	NSM	GRE	BRI	SBO	SBO	MEM	BLN	TMP	NHA	IOW	GLN	LGY; 10	NJM	DOV	51st	34	
2018	TC Motorsports	91	Toyota	NSM	BRI	LGY; 15	SBO; 2	SBO; 6	MEM	NJM	TMP	NHA	IOW	GLN	GTW	NHA	DOV	24th	109	
2019	TC Motorsports	91	Toyota	NSM	BRI	SBO; 11	SBO; 10	MEM	NHA	IOW	GLN	BRI; 13	GTW	NHA; 9	DOV; 10			14th	167	
2020	TC Motorsports	91	Toyota	NSM; 21	TOL; 6	DOV; 14	TOL; 11	BRI; 10	FIF; 8									6th	294	
2021	TC Motorsports	91	Toyota	NSM	FIF	NSV	DOV; 17	SNM; 5	IOW	MLW	BRI; 16							21st	94	
2022	TC Motorsports	91	Toyota	NSM	FIF	DOV	NSV	IOW	MLW	BRI; 26								57th	18	

=== CARS Late Model Stock Car Tour ===
(key) (Bold – Pole position awarded by qualifying time. Italics – Pole position earned by points standings or practice time. * – Most laps led. ** – All laps led.)

CARS Late Model Stock Car Tour results
Year	Team	No.	Make	1	2	3	4	5	6	7	8	9	10	11	12	13	14	15	16	CLMSCTC	Pts	Ref
2019	TC Motorsports	91	Toyota	SNM	HCY	ROU	ACE	MMS	LGY; 21	DOM; 15	CCS; 5	HCY; DNQ	ROU	SBO						28th	60	
2020	TC Motorsports	91	Toyota	SNM	ACE	HCY	HCY	DOM	FCS	LGY; 24	CCS	FLO	GRE							57th	9	
2021	TC Motorsports	91C	Toyota	DIL	HCY	OCS	ACE	CRW	LGY; 13	DOM	HCY	MMS	TCM	FLC	WKS	SBO				45th	20	
2023	TC Motorsports	91C	Toyota	SNM	FLC	HCY	ACE	NWS	LGY; 13	DOM	CRW	HCY	ACE	TCM	WKS	AAS	SBO	TCM	CRW	58th	20	
2025	TC Motorsports	91	Chevy	AAS	WCS	CDL	OCS	ACE	NWS	LGY; 16	DOM	CRW	HCY	AND	FLC	SBO	TCM	NWS		72nd	26	
