= 2024 Long John Silver's 200 =

6th race of the 2024 NASCAR Craftsman Truck Series

Race details
- Race 6 of 23 of the 2024 NASCAR Craftsman Truck Series
- Date: April 5, 2024
- Official name: 26th Annual Long John Silver's 200
- Location: Martinsville Speedway in Ridgeway, Virginia
- Course: Permanent racing facility
- Course length: 0.526 miles (0.847 km)
- Distance: 200 laps, 105 mi (169 km)
- Scheduled distance: 200 laps, 105 mi (169 km)
- Average speed: 46.849 mph (75.396 km/h)

Pole position
Driver	Ty Majeski	ThorSport Racing
- Time: 19.417

Most laps led
Driver	Christian Eckes	McAnally-Hilgemann Racing
- Laps: 133

Winner
No. 19	Christian Eckes	McAnally-Hilgemann Racing

Television in the United States
- Network: FS1
- Announcers: Jamie Little, Phil Parsons, and Michael Waltrip

Radio in the United States
- Radio: MRN

The 2024 Long John Silver's 200 was the 6th stock car race of the 2024 NASCAR Craftsman Truck Series, and the 26th iteration of the event. The race was held on Friday, April 5, 2024, at Martinsville Speedway in Ridgeway, Virginia, a 0.526 miles (0.847 km) permanent asphalt paperclip-shaped short track. The race took the scheduled 200 laps to complete. In an action packed race that produced numerous spins and wrecks, Christian Eckes, driving for McAnally-Hilgemann Racing, would put on a blistering performance, winning both stages and leading a race-high 133 laps to earn his seventh career NASCAR Craftsman Truck Series win, and his second of the season. Pole sitter Ty Majeski led 66 laps of the race, and was in contention of stealing the win on the final restart, but was unable to hold off Eckes and finished 2nd. To fill out the podium, Chase Purdy, driving for Spire Motorsports, would finish 3rd, respectively.

== Report ==
=== Background ===
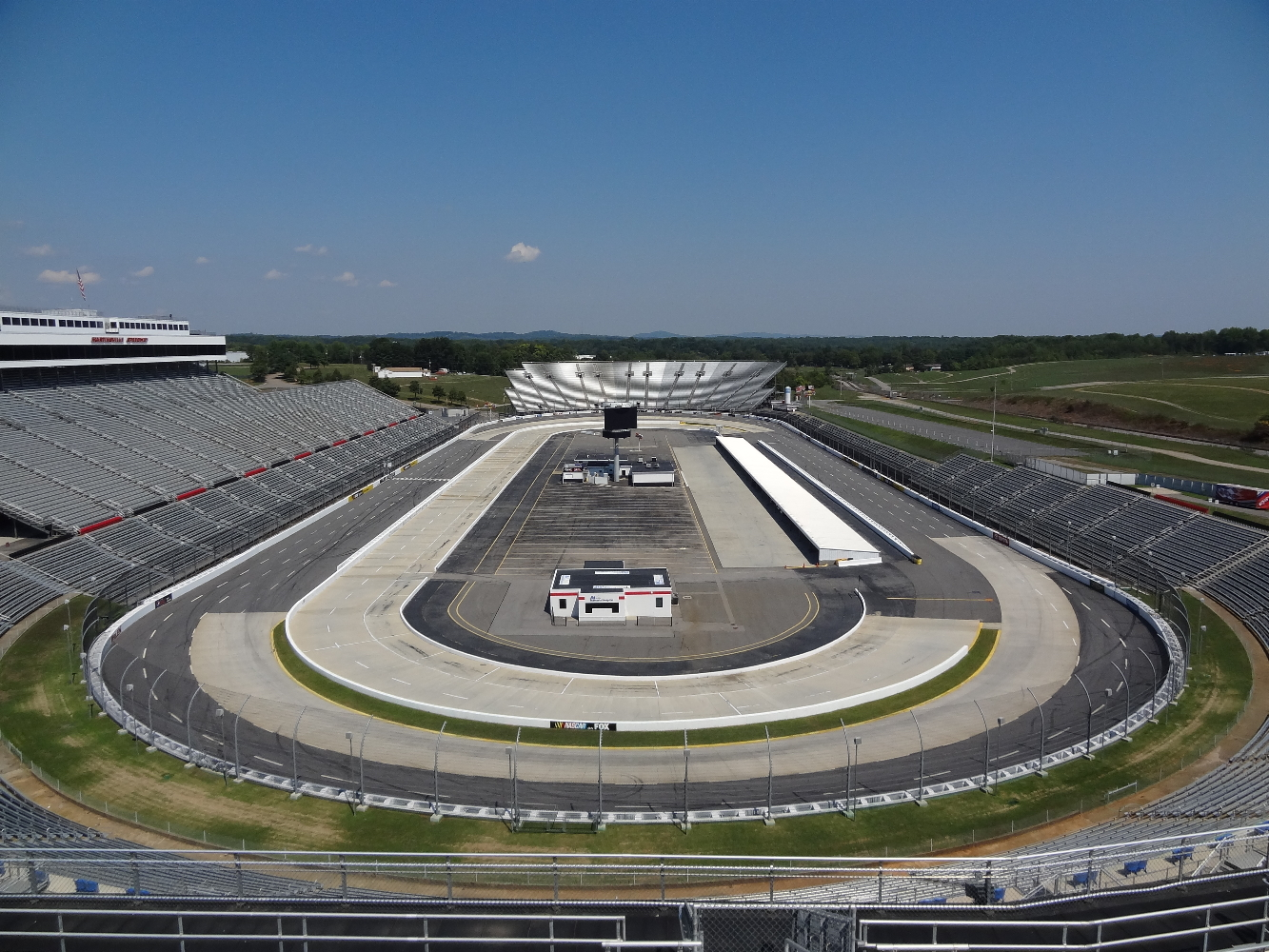
Martinsville Speedway, the circuit where the race will be held.

Martinsville Speedway is a NASCAR-owned stock car racing track located in Henry County, in Ridgeway, Virginia, just to the south of Martinsville. At 0.526 miles (0.847 km) in length, it is the shortest track in the NASCAR Cup Series. The track was also one of the first paved oval tracks in NASCAR, being built in 1947 by H. Clay Earles. It is also the only remaining race track on the NASCAR circuit since its beginning in 1948.

==== Entry list ====
- (R) denotes rookie driver.
- (i) denotes driver who is ineligible for series driver points.

#	Driver	Team	Make
1	William Sawalich	Tricon Garage	Toyota
02	Mason Massey	Young's Motorsports	Chevrolet
2	Nick Sanchez	Rev Racing	Chevrolet
5	Dean Thompson	Tricon Garage	Toyota
7	Sammy Smith (i)	Spire Motorsports	Chevrolet
9	Grant Enfinger	CR7 Motorsports	Chevrolet
11	Corey Heim	Tricon Garage	Toyota
13	Jake Garcia	ThorSport Racing	Ford
15	Tanner Gray	Tricon Garage	Toyota
17	Taylor Gray	Tricon Garage	Toyota
18	Tyler Ankrum	McAnally-Hilgemann Racing	Chevrolet
19	Christian Eckes	McAnally-Hilgemann Racing	Chevrolet
20	Blake Lothian	Young's Motorsports	Chevrolet
22	Stephen Mallozzi	Reaume Brothers Racing	Ford
25	Ty Dillon	Rackley W.A.R.	Chevrolet
32	Bret Holmes	Bret Holmes Racing	Chevrolet
33	Lawless Alan	Reaume Brothers Racing	Ford
38	Layne Riggs (R)	Front Row Motorsports	Ford
41	Bayley Currey	Niece Motorsports	Chevrolet
42	Matt Mills	Niece Motorsports	Chevrolet
43	Daniel Dye	McAnally-Hilgemann Racing	Chevrolet
45	Kaden Honeycutt	Niece Motorsports	Chevrolet
46	Thad Moffitt (R)	Faction46	Chevrolet
52	Stewart Friesen	Halmar Friesen Racing	Toyota
56	Timmy Hill	Hill Motorsports	Toyota
66	Cam Waters	ThorSport Racing	Ford
71	Rajah Caruth	Spire Motorsports	Chevrolet
76	Spencer Boyd	Freedom Racing Enterprises	Chevrolet
77	Chase Purdy	Spire Motorsports	Chevrolet
88	Matt Crafton	ThorSport Racing	Ford
90	Justin Carroll	TC Motorsports	Toyota
91	Jack Wood	McAnally-Hilgemann Racing	Chevrolet
98	Ty Majeski	ThorSport Racing	Ford
99	Ben Rhodes	ThorSport Racing	Ford
Official entry list

== Practice ==
Practice was held on Friday, April 5, at 3:05 PM EST. Since Martinsville Speedway is a short track, drivers will be split into two groups, Group A and B, with both sessions being 15 minutes long. Ty Majeski, driving for ThorSport Racing, would set the fastest time between both sessions, with a lap of 19.985, and a speed of 94.751 mph (152.487 km/h).

Pos.	#	Driver	Team	Make	Time	Speed
1	98	Ty Majeski	ThorSport Racing	Ford	19.985	94.751
2	11	Corey Heim	Tricon Garage	Toyota	20.009	94.637
3	19	Christian Eckes	McAnally-Hilgemann Racing	Chevrolet	20.067	94.364
Full practice results

== Qualifying ==
Qualifying was held on Friday, April 5, at 3:40 PM EST. Since Martinsville Speedway is a short track, the qualifying system used is a single-car, two-lap system with only one round. Drivers will be on track by themselves and will have two laps to post a qualifying time. Whoever sets the fastest time in that round will win the pole.

Ty Majeski, driving for ThorSport Racing, would score the pole for the race, with a track record lap of 19.417, and a speed of 97.523 mph (156.948 km/h).

No drivers would fail to qualify.

=== Qualifying results ===
Pos.	#	Driver	Team	Make	Time	Speed
1	98	Ty Majeski	ThorSport Racing	Ford	19.417	97.523
2	19	Christian Eckes	McAnally-Hilgemann Racing	Chevrolet	19.437	97.422
3	38	Layne Riggs (R)	Front Row Motorsports	Ford	19.502	97.098
4	11	Corey Heim	Tricon Garage	Toyota	19.517	97.023
5	2	Nick Sanchez	Rev Racing	Chevrolet	19.551	96.854
6	99	Ben Rhodes	ThorSport Racing	Ford	19.586	96.681
7	13	Jake Garcia	ThorSport Racing	Ford	19.595	96.637
8	5	Dean Thompson	Tricon Garage	Toyota	19.596	96.632
9	18	Tyler Ankrum	McAnally-Hilgemann Racing	Chevrolet	19.599	96.617
10	91	Jack Wood	McAnally-Hilgemann Racing	Chevrolet	19.612	96.553
11	77	Chase Purdy	Spire Motorsports	Chevrolet	19.639	96.420
12	17	Taylor Gray	Tricon Garage	Toyota	19.643	96.401
13	7	Sammy Smith (i)	Spire Motorsports	Chevrolet	19.670	96.268
14	52	Stewart Friesen	Halmar Friesen Racing	Toyota	19.670	96.268
15	41	Bayley Currey	Niece Motorsports	Chevrolet	19.674	96.249
16	71	Rajah Caruth	Spire Motorsports	Chevrolet	19.712	96.063
17	45	Kaden Honeycutt	Niece Motorsports	Chevrolet	19.712	96.063
18	25	Ty Dillon	Rackley W.A.R.	Chevrolet	19.717	96.039
19	15	Tanner Gray	Tricon Garage	Toyota	19.735	95.951
20	9	Grant Enfinger	CR7 Motorsports	Chevrolet	19.755	95.854
21	1	William Sawalich	Tricon Garage	Toyota	19.756	95.849
22	66	Cam Waters	ThorSport Racing	Ford	19.762	95.820
23	43	Daniel Dye	McAnally-Hilgemann Racing	Chevrolet	19.802	95.627
24	88	Matt Crafton	ThorSport Racing	Ford	19.809	95.593
25	42	Matt Mills	Niece Motorsports	Chevrolet	19.851	95.391
26	33	Lawless Alan	Reaume Brothers Racing	Ford	19.976	94.794
27	56	Timmy Hill	Hill Motorsports	Toyota	19.980	94.775
28	32	Bret Holmes	Bret Holmes Racing	Chevrolet	20.047	94.458
29	02	Mason Massey	Young's Motorsports	Chevrolet	20.057	94.411
30	76	Spencer Boyd	Freedom Racing Enterprises	Chevrolet	20.061	94.392
31	22	Stephen Mallozzi	Reaume Brothers Racing	Ford	20.403	92.810
Qualified by owner's points
32	20	Blake Lothian	Young's Motorsports	Chevrolet	20.862	90.768
33	46	Thad Moffitt (R)	Faction46	Chevrolet	–	–
34	90	Justin Carroll	TC Motorsports	Toyota	–	–
Official qualifying results
Official starting lineup

== Race results ==
Stage 1 Laps: 50

Pos.	#	Driver	Team	Make	Pts
1	19	Christian Eckes	McAnally-Hilgemann Racing	Chevrolet	10
2	98	Ty Majeski	ThorSport Racing	Ford	9
3	38	Layne Riggs (R)	Front Row Motorsports	Ford	8
4	11	Corey Heim	Tricon Garage	Toyota	7
5	2	Nick Sanchez	Rev Racing	Chevrolet	6
6	99	Ben Rhodes	ThorSport Racing	Ford	5
7	18	Tyler Ankrum	McAnally-Hilgemann Racing	Chevrolet	4
8	13	Jake Garcia	ThorSport Racing	Ford	3
9	45	Kaden Honeycutt	Niece Motorsports	Chevrolet	2
10	77	Chase Purdy	Spire Motorsports	Chevrolet	1

Stage 2 Laps: 50

Pos.	#	Driver	Team	Make	Pts
1	19	Christian Eckes	McAnally-Hilgemann Racing	Chevrolet	10
2	18	Tyler Ankrum	McAnally-Hilgemann Racing	Chevrolet	9
3	77	Chase Purdy	Spire Motorsports	Chevrolet	8
4	98	Ty Majeski	ThorSport Racing	Ford	7
5	45	Kaden Honeycutt	Niece Motorsports	Chevrolet	6
6	13	Jake Garcia	ThorSport Racing	Ford	5
7	5	Dean Thompson	Tricon Garage	Toyota	4
8	41	Bayley Currey	Niece Motorsports	Chevrolet	3
9	17	Taylor Gray	Tricon Garage	Toyota	2
10	1	William Sawalich	Tricon Garage	Toyota	1

Stage 3 Laps: 100

Fin	St	#	Driver	Team	Make	Laps	Led	Status	Pts
1	2	19	Christian Eckes	McAnally-Hilgemann Racing	Chevrolet	200	133	Running	60
2	1	98	Ty Majeski	ThorSport Racing	Ford	200	66	Running	51
3	11	77	Chase Purdy	Spire Motorsports	Chevrolet	200	0	Running	43
4	5	2	Nick Sanchez	Rev Racing	Chevrolet	200	1	Running	39
5	9	18	Tyler Ankrum	McAnally-Hilgemann Racing	Chevrolet	200	0	Running	45
6	12	17	Taylor Gray	Tricon Garage	Toyota	200	0	Running	33
7	16	71	Rajah Caruth	Spire Motorsports	Chevrolet	200	0	Running	30
8	13	7	Sammy Smith (i)	Spire Motorsports	Chevrolet	200	0	Running	0
9	17	45	Kaden Honeycutt	Niece Motorsports	Chevrolet	200	0	Running	36
10	4	11	Corey Heim	Tricon Garage	Toyota	200	0	Running	34
11	29	02	Mason Massey	Young's Motorsports	Chevrolet	200	0	Running	26
12	24	88	Matt Crafton	ThorSport Racing	Ford	200	0	Running	25
13	23	43	Daniel Dye	McAnally-Hilgemann Racing	Chevrolet	200	0	Running	24
14	6	99	Ben Rhodes	ThorSport Racing	Ford	200	0	Running	28
15	3	38	Layne Riggs (R)	Front Row Motorsports	Ford	200	0	Running	30
16	19	15	Tanner Gray	Tricon Garage	Toyota	200	0	Running	21
17	15	41	Bayley Currey	Niece Motorsports	Chevrolet	200	0	Running	23
18	10	91	Jack Wood	McAnally-Hilgemann Racing	Chevrolet	200	0	Running	19
19	14	52	Stewart Friesen	Halmar Friesen Racing	Toyota	200	0	Running	18
20	27	56	Timmy Hill	Hill Motorsports	Toyota	200	0	Running	17
21	7	13	Jake Garcia	ThorSport Racing	Ford	200	0	Running	24
22	20	9	Grant Enfinger	CR7 Motorsports	Chevrolet	200	0	Running	15
23	18	25	Ty Dillon	Rackley W.A.R.	Chevrolet	200	0	Running	14
24	28	32	Bret Holmes	Bret Holmes Racing	Chevrolet	200	0	Running	13
25	30	76	Spencer Boyd	Freedom Racing Enterprises	Chevrolet	200	0	Running	12
26	21	1	William Sawalich	Tricon Garage	Toyota	200	0	Running	12
27	33	46	Thad Moffitt (R)	Faction46	Chevrolet	200	0	Running	10
28	31	22	Stephen Mallozzi	Reaume Brothers Racing	Ford	198	0	Running	9
29	25	42	Matt Mills	Niece Motorsports	Chevrolet	193	0	Accident	8
30	22	66	Cam Waters	ThorSport Racing	Ford	176	0	Accident	7
31	26	33	Lawless Alan	Reaume Brothers Racing	Ford	166	0	DVP	6
32	34	90	Justin Carroll	TC Motorsports	Toyota	158	0	Accident	5
33	8	5	Dean Thompson	Tricon Garage	Toyota	145	0	Accident	8
34	32	20	Blake Lothian	Young's Motorsports	Chevrolet	17	0	Overheating	3
Official race results

== Standings after the race ==
Drivers' Championship standings

	Pos	Driver	Points
1	1	Ty Majeski	248
1	2	Corey Heim	241 (-7)
	3	Tyler Ankrum	241 (–7)
2	4	Christian Eckes	237 (–11)
1	5	Taylor Gray	212 (–36)
1	6	Nick Sanchez	209 (–39)
2	7	Rajah Caruth	208 (–40)
	8	Matt Crafton	173 (–75)
	9	Grant Enfinger	154 (–94)
1	10	Ben Rhodes	148 (–100)
Official driver's standings

Manufacturers' Championship standings

Pos	Manufacturer	Points
1	Chevrolet	233
2	Toyota	204 (–29)
3	Ford	196 (–37)

- Note: Only the first 10 positions are included for the driver standings.

Previous race: 2024 XPEL 225	NASCAR Craftsman Truck Series; 2024 season	Next race: 2024 SpeedyCash.com 250
