= Thad Moffitt =

American racing driver (born 2000)

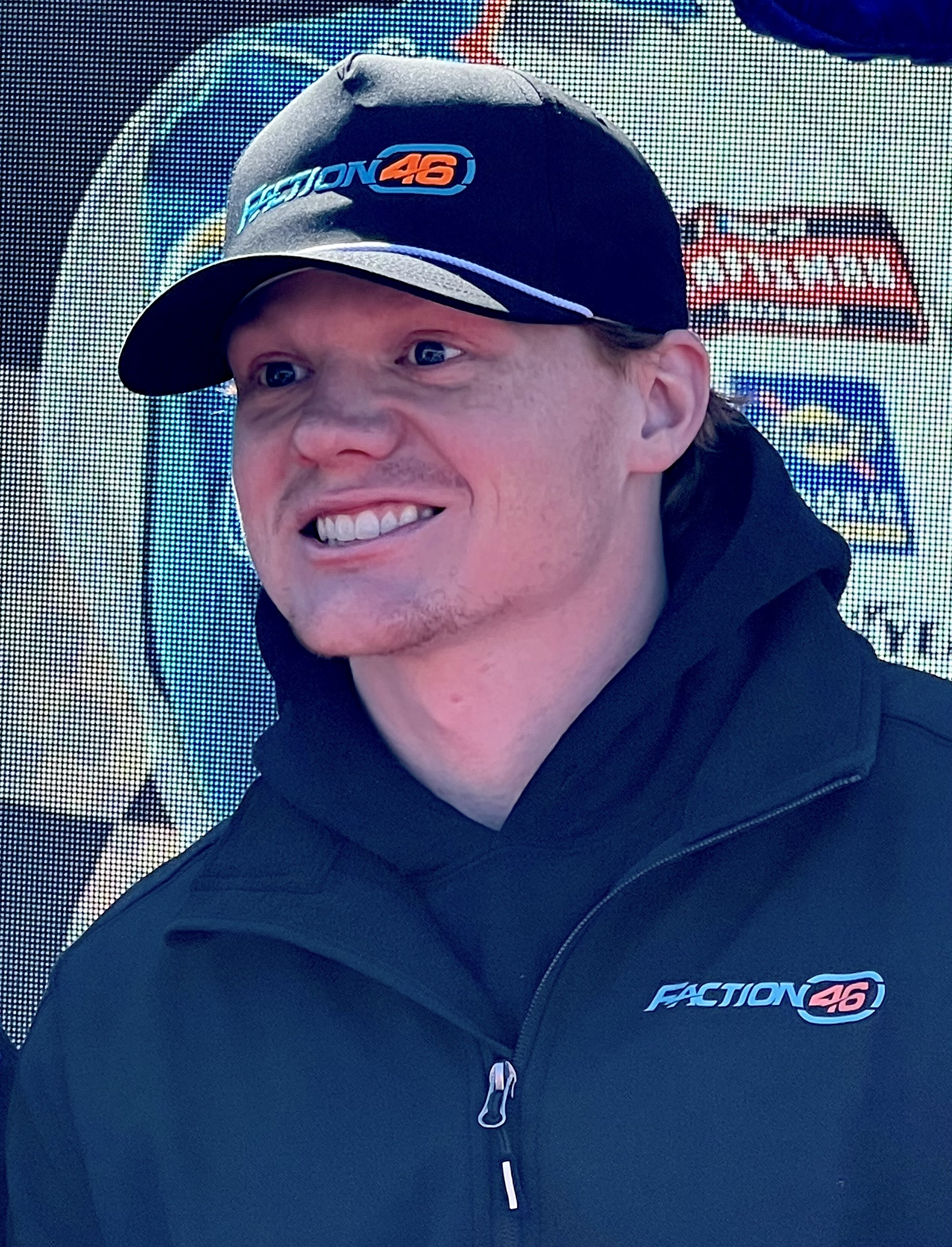
- Moffitt at Las Vegas Motor Speedway in 2024
- Born: Thaddeus Drake Moffitt; September 12, 2000 (age 26); Trinity, North Carolina, U.S.
- Achievements: 2016 Southeast Limited Late Model Series Challenger Division Champion

NASCAR FedEx Freight Truck Series career
- 21 races run over 2 years
- 2024 position: 32nd
- Best finish: 32nd (2024)
- First race: 2022 NextEra Energy 250 (Daytona)
- Last race: 2024 NASCAR Craftsman Truck Series Championship Race (Phoenix)
Wins	Top tens	Poles
0	0	0

ARCA Menards Series career
- 54 races run over 7 years
- Best finish: 4th (2021)
- First race: 2017 Music City 200 (Nashville Fairgrounds)
- Last race: 2025 Reese's 150 (Kansas)
Wins	Top tens	Poles
0	32	0

ARCA Menards Series East career
- 4 races run over 2 years
- Best finish: 15th (2021)
- First race: 2021 Shore Lunch 150 (Iowa)
- Last race: 2025 LiUNA! 150 (IRP)
Wins	Top tens	Poles
0	3	0

ARCA Menards Series West career
- 3 races run over 2 years
- Best finish: 30th (2025)
- First race: 2021 General Tire 150 (Phoenix)
- Last race: 2025 Desert Diamond Casino West Valley 100 (Phoenix)
Wins	Top tens	Poles
0	3	0
- Statistics up to date as of November 2, 2025.

Thaddeus Drake Moffitt (born September 12, 2000) is an American professional stock car racing driver. He last competed part-time in the ARCA Menards Series, driving the No. 46/70 Toyota for Nitro Motorsports. He previously competed in the NASCAR Craftsman Truck Series.

== Racing career ==
=== Early career ===
Growing up in a racing family, Moffitt cut his teeth in go-karts at age fourteen and later moved up to quarter midgets and limited late models, running at tracks like Caraway Speedway and Ace Speedway. Speaking about having racers in the family, he said that advice will be given upon request but also that older relatives wanted him to develop without help. Moffitt was the 2016 Southeast Limited Late Model champion and won his first late model race earlier that year.

=== ARCA Menards Series ===
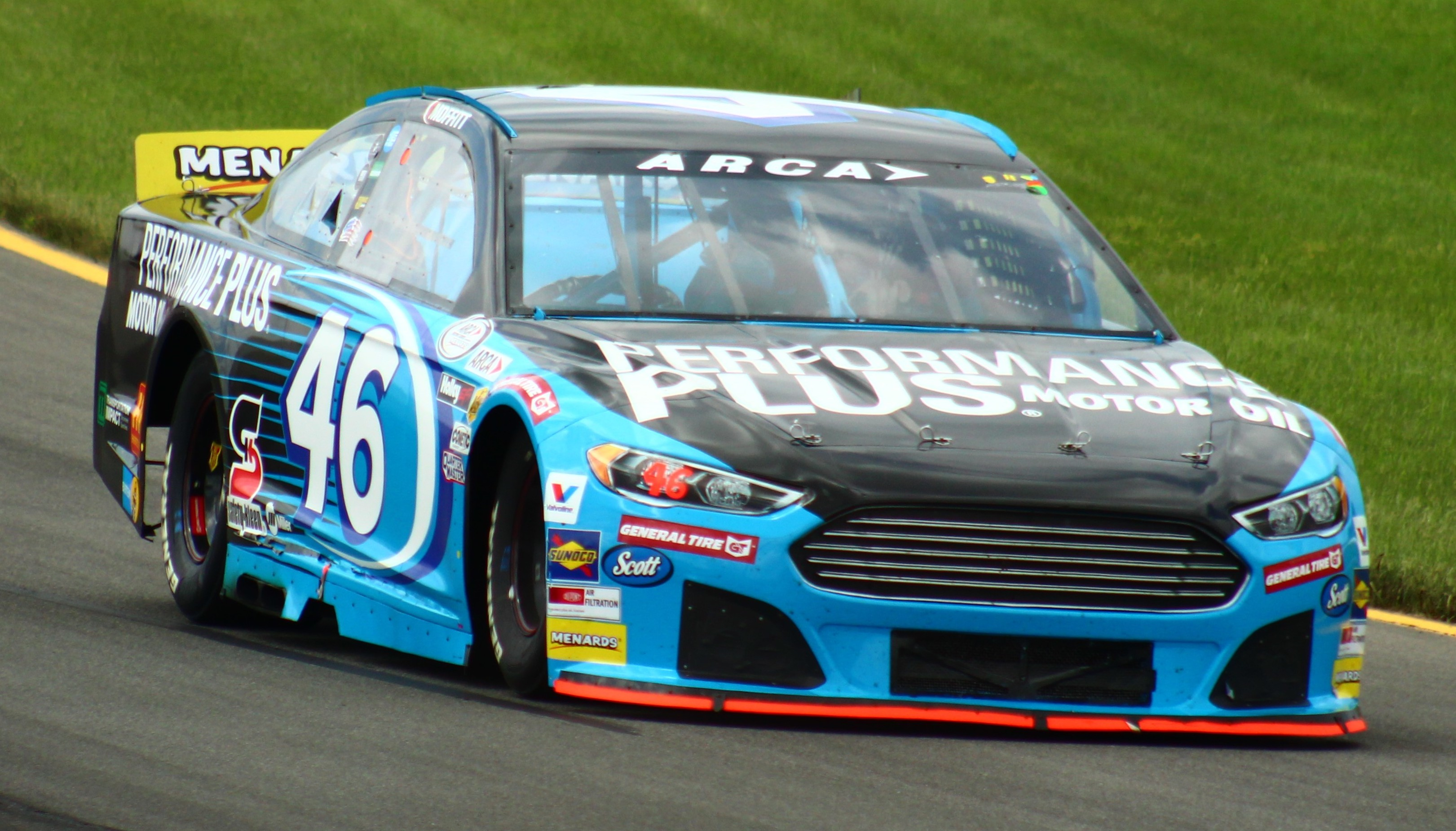
Moffitt's No. 46 car at Pocono Raceway in 2018

Moffitt made his ARCA Racing Series debut in April 2017 at Nashville Fairgrounds Speedway, driving a car reminiscent of one driven by his grandfather Richard Petty, for Empire Racing, a satellite team of Richard Petty Motorsports. He ran a total of three races in 2017. Moffitt's best finish was eleventh, at Lucas Oil Raceway.

In early 2018, Moffitt tested at Daytona International Speedway and announced races at Nashville Fairgrounds Speedway, Pocono Raceway and Lucas Oil with the potential for more races to be added later in the year. In his second start of the year, at Salem Speedway, Moffitt was involved in two incidents, one with Natalie Decker and one with Jack Dossey III. Moffitt rebounded from a mid-race spin in his next race to claim his first top ten, finishing tenth in the race at Toledo.

On January 9, 2020, it was announced that Moffitt would join DGR-Crosley for the season-opening race at Daytona, and would then run all races on the schedule until sponsorship dried up, plus Memphis, which the team had previously signed a sponsor for. He claimed three top-five finishes over thirteen races, with a career-best finish of fourth at Memphis.

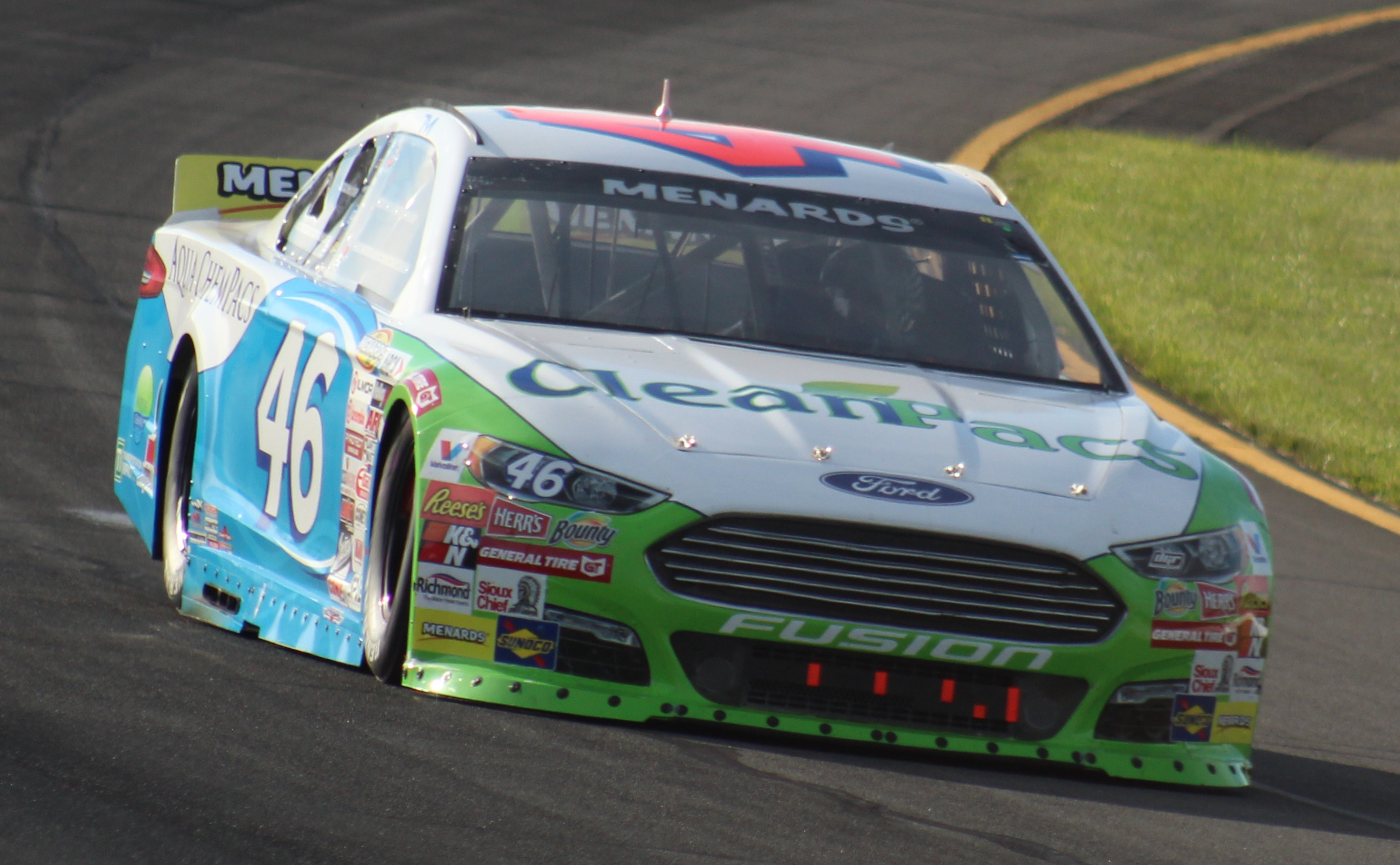
Moffitt's No. 46 car at Pocono Raceway in 2021

In January 2021, it was announced that Moffitt would return to ARCA with the renamed David Gilliland Racing team for at least eleven races that year. He proceeded to compete in almost the entire season, only being replaced by Taylor Gray for the dirt races and Canadian J. P. Bergeron for the final two events. At Michigan, Moffitt was involved in controversy after his retaliation attempt against Drew Dollar for a previous wreck that resulted in a crash that injured Tim Richmond.

On January 7, 2025, it was announced that Moffitt would return to running ARCA full time with Nitro Motorsports.

On June 10, 2025, it was revealed that Moffitt would scale to part-time for Nitro so that they would make room for Treyten Lapcevich and their No. 70 entry.

=== NASCAR Craftsman Truck Series ===
On February 10, 2022, it was announced that Moffitt would make his Camping World Truck Series debut at Daytona for Reaume Brothers Racing in collaboration with GMS Racing, running a paint scheme that paid tribute to Richard Petty's 1992 retirement season.

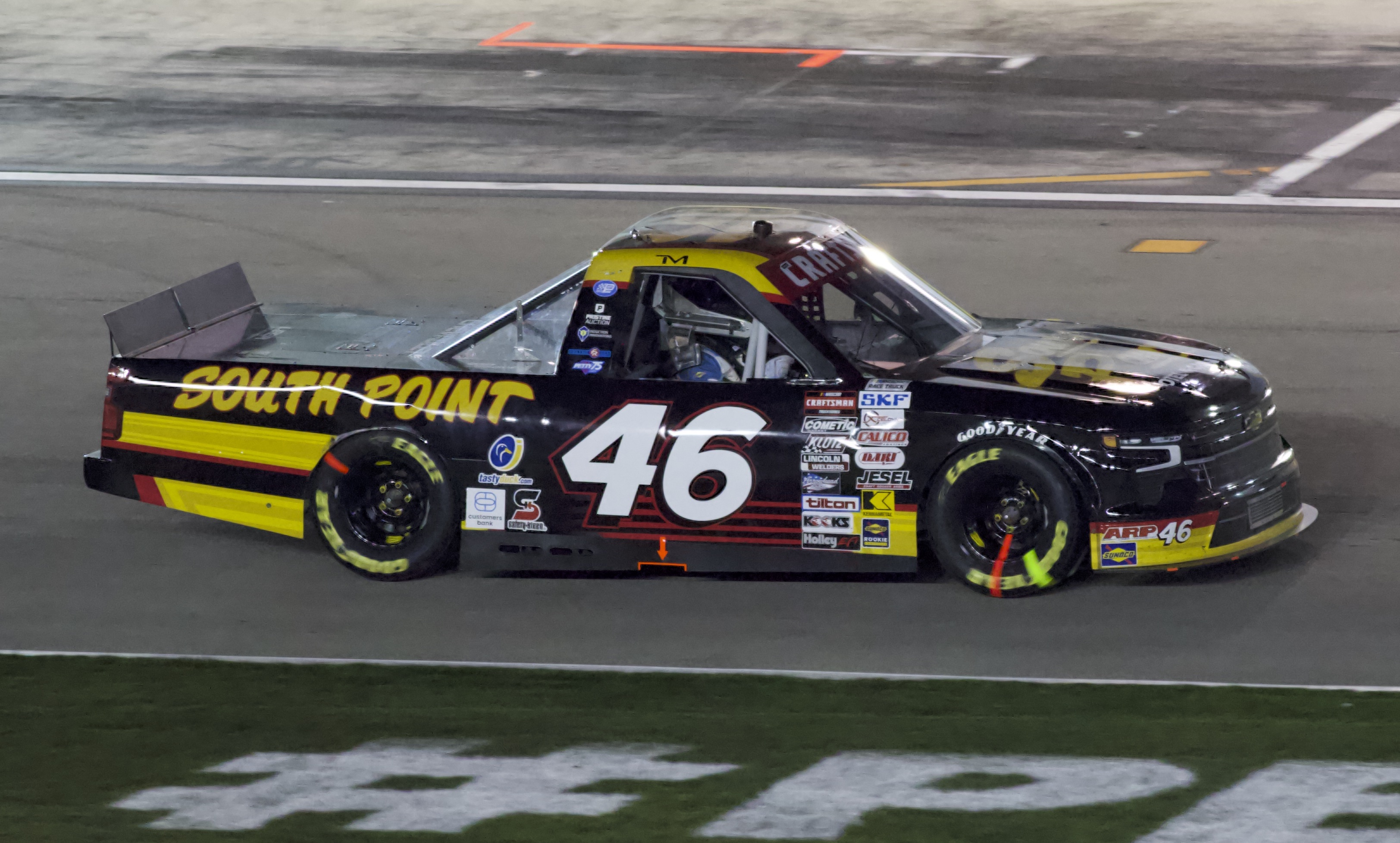
Moffitt's No. 46 truck at Las Vegas Motor Speedway in 2024.

On December 9, 2023, Moffitt was announced as the full-time driver for the new NASCAR team, Faction46, in the No. 46 Chevrolet for the upcoming 2024 season. On June 28, 2024, prior to the race at Nashville Superspeedway, Moffitt had a medical emergency and the team substituted Dawson Cram as the driver of the No. 46 truck. On July 8, 2024, Faction46 team owner Lane Moore officially shut down the team due to financial constraints. On July 10, 2024 Young's Motorsports officially announced that Moffitt would drive the No. 46 at Pocono Raceway and the remainder of the 2024 season, which is the same team he drove for at one point in 2022. On September 19, 2024, Moffit announced via X that due to lack of funding, he would not race for as much of the remainder of the 2024 season. Moffit returned to the No. 46 at Phoenix. He finished the season 32nd in the points standings, last of the ROTY Contenders.

=== Trans Am ===
In 2023, Moffitt would run the full schedule in the Trans Am Series, driving the No. 43 Chevrolet for TeamSLR with support from Petty's Garage in the TA2 class. He would earn six top-tens with a best finish of second at the second Detroit Street Circuit race on his way to finish seventh in the class standings.

== Personal life ==
Moffitt was born on September 12, 2000, to Brian Moffitt and Rebecca Petty-Moffitt in Trinity, North Carolina. His mother, Rebecca, is the youngest daughter of NASCAR Hall of Fame driver Richard Petty. Throughout his childhood, Moffitt played football and other organized sports. In his mid-teens, Moffitt began competing in Kart racing before moving to Late model racing in 2016. Moffitt had attended Wheatmore High School before deciding to switch to online schooling midway through his high school career.

In 2019, Moffitt traveled to England to run a 1981 edition of grandfather Richard Petty's racecar at the Goodwood Festival of Speed.

Despite sharing the same last name, he is not related to fellow NASCAR competitor Brett Moffitt.

== Motorsports career results ==
=== NASCAR ===
(key) (Bold – Pole position awarded by qualifying time. Italics – Pole position earned by points standings or practice time. * – Most laps led.)

==== Craftsman Truck Series ====
NASCAR Craftsman Truck Series results
Year	Team	No.	Make	1	2	3	4	5	6	7	8	9	10	11	12	13	14	15	16	17	18	19	20	21	22	23	NCTC	Pts	Ref
2022	Reaume Brothers Racing	43	Chevy	DAY; 18	LVS; 29	ATL; 32	COA	MAR	BRD	DAR	KAN	TEX	CLT	GTW	SON												46th	38	
2022	Young's Motorsports	20	Chevy													KNX; 31	NSH	MOH	POC	IRP	RCH	KAN	BRI	TAL	HOM	PHO	46th	38	
2024	Faction46	46	Chevy	DAY; 36	ATL; 26	LVS; 25	BRI; 26	COA; 32	MAR; 27	TEX; 32	KAN; 24	DAR; 18	NWS; 31	CLT; 33	GTW; 28	NSH											32nd	138	
2024	Young's Motorsports	46	Chevy														POC; 29	IRP; 32	RCH; 33	MLW; 32	BRI	KAN	TAL	HOM	MAR	PHO; 27	32nd	138	

^{*} Season still in progress
^{1} Ineligible for series points

=== ARCA Menards Series ===
(key) (Bold – Pole position awarded by qualifying time. Italics – Pole position earned by points standings or practice time. * – Most laps led.)

ARCA Menards Series results
Year	Team	No.	Make	1	2	3	4	5	6	7	8	9	10	11	12	13	14	15	16	17	18	19	20	AMSC	Pts	Ref
2017	Empire Racing	46	Ford	DAY	NSH; 16	SLM	TAL	TOL; 23	ELK	POC	MCH	MAD	IOW	IRP; 11	POC	WIN	ISF	ROA	DSF	SLM	CHI	KEN	KAN	45th	440	
2018	Empire Racing	46	Ford	DAY	NSH; 14	SLM; 16	TAL	TOL; 10	CLT	POC; 25	MCH	MAD	GTW	CHI	IOW	ELK	POC	ISF	BLN	DSF	SLM			26th	780	
2018	Empire Racing	46	Chevy																			IRP; 15	KAN	26th	780	
2019	Empire Racing	46	Chevy	DAY; 27	FIF	SLM	TAL; 25	NSH; 9	TOL	CLT; 10	POC	MCH	MAD	GTW; 9										23rd	1110	
2019	Empire Racing	46	Ford												CHI; 9	ELK	IOW	POC; 11	ISF	DSF	SLM	IRP	KAN	23rd	1110	
2020	DGR-Crosley	46	Ford	DAY; 5	PHO; 18	TAL; 6	POC; 20	IRP; 5	KEN; 15	IOW; 10	KAN; 10	TOL; 12	TOL; 8	MCH; 9	DRC; 11	GTW	L44	TOL	BRI	WIN	MEM; 4	ISF	KAN	9th	539	
2021	David Gilliland Racing	46	Ford	DAY; 21	PHO; 3	TAL; 6	KAN; 6	TOL; 5	CLT; 7	MOH; 3	POC; 5	ELK; 9	BLN; 12	IOW; 6	WIN; 4	GLN; 11	MCH; 8	ISF	MLW; 9	DSF	BRI; 25	SLM	KAN	4th	666	
2022	Ferrier-McClure Racing	44	Chevy	DAY	PHO	TAL; 4	KAN	CLT	IOW	BLN	ELK	MOH	POC	IRP	MCH	GLN	ISF	MLW	DSF	KAN	BRI	SLM	TOL	74th	40	
2025	Nitro Motorsports	46	Toyota	DAY; 37	PHO; 7	TAL; 2	KAN; 16	CLT; 7	MCH; 6	BLN	ELK	LRP	DOV	IRP; 10	IOW							KAN; 7	TOL	13th	327	
2025	Nitro Motorsports	70	Toyota													GLN; 15	ISF	MAD	DSF	BRI	SLM			13th	327	

==== ARCA Menards Series East ====
ARCA Menards Series East results
Year	Team	No.	Make	1	2	3	4	5	6	7	8	AMSEC	Pts	Ref
2021	David Gilliland Racing	46	Ford	NSM	FIF	NSV	DOV	SNM	IOW; 6	MLW; 9	BRI; 25	15th	143	
2025	Nitro Motorsports	46	Toyota	FIF	CAR	NSV	FRS	DOV	IRP; 10	IOW	BRI	52nd	34	

==== ARCA Menards Series West ====
ARCA Menards Series West results
Year	Team	No.	Make	1	2	3	4	5	6	7	8	9	10	11	12	AMSWC	Pts	Ref
2021	David Gilliland Racing	46	Ford	PHO; 3	SON	IRW	CNS	IRW	PIR	LVS	AAS	PHO				38th	42	
2025	Nitro Motorsports	46	Toyota	KER	PHO; 7	TUC	CNS	KER	SON	TRI	PIR	AAS	MAD	LVS	PHO; 8	30th	73	
