= 2024 Weather Guard Truck Race =

4th race of the 2024 NASCAR Craftsman Truck Series

Race details
- Race 4 of 23 of the 2024 NASCAR Craftsman Truck Series
- Date: March 16, 2024
- Official name: 4th Annual Weather Guard Truck Race
- Location: Bristol Motor Speedway in Bristol, Tennessee
- Course: Permanent racing facility
- Course length: 0.533 miles (0.858 km)
- Distance: 250 laps, 133 mi (214 km)
- Scheduled distance: 250 laps, 133 mi (214 km)
- Average speed: 80.017 mph (128.775 km/h)

Pole position
Driver	Christian Eckes	McAnally-Hilgemann Racing
- Time: 15.122

Most laps led
Driver	Christian Eckes	McAnally-Hilgemann Racing
- Laps: 144

Winner
No. 19	Christian Eckes	McAnally-Hilgemann Racing

Television in the United States
- Network: FS1
- Announcers: Adam Alexander, Phil Parsons, and Michael Waltrip

Radio in the United States
- Radio: MRN

The 2024 Weather Guard Truck Race was the 4th stock car race of the 2024 NASCAR Craftsman Truck Series, and the 4th iteration of the event. The race was held on Saturday, March 16, 2024, at Bristol Motor Speedway in Bristol, Tennessee, a 0.533 miles (0.858 km) permanent asphalt oval shaped short track. The race took the scheduled 250 laps to complete. Throughout the entirety of the event, the race was known for an intense and exciting battle between Christian Eckes and Kyle Busch. Eckes, driving for McAnally-Hilgemann Racing, took over the lead from Busch on the final restart, and held him off in the final few laps to earn his sixth career NASCAR Craftsman Truck Series win, and his first of the season. Eckes won the pole and led a race-high 144 laps. Busch led 105 laps and won both stages, but spun his tires on the final restart and ultimately finished 2nd. To fill out the podium, Busch, driving for Spire Motorsports, and Zane Smith, driving for McAnally-Hilgemann Racing, would finish 2nd and 3rd, respectively.

== Report ==
=== Background ===
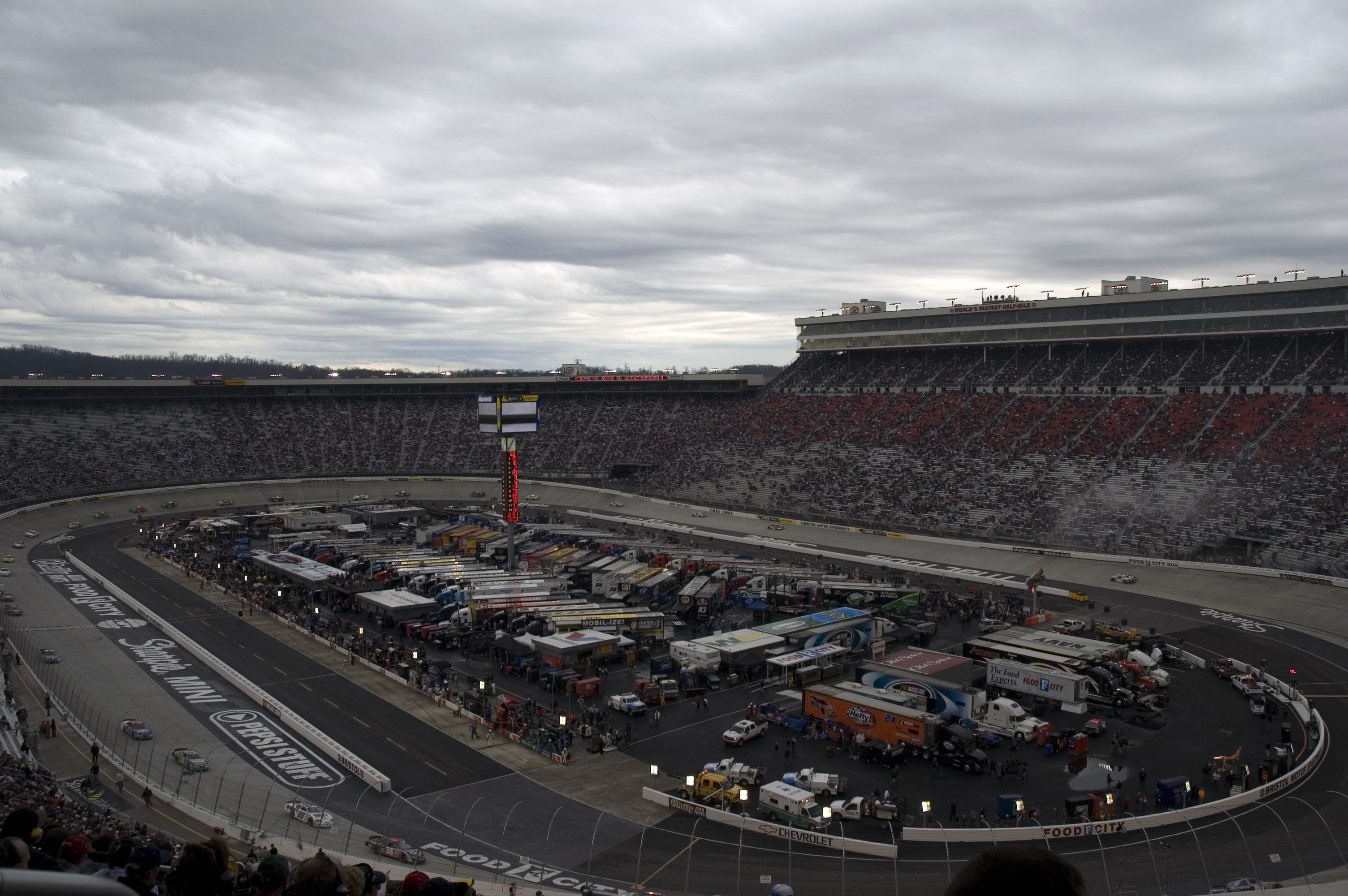
Bristol Motor Speedway, the circuit where the race will be held.

Bristol Motor Speedway, formerly known as Bristol International Raceway and Bristol Raceway, is a NASCAR short track venue located in Bristol, Tennessee. Constructed in 1960, it held its first NASCAR race on July 30, 1961. Bristol is among the most popular tracks on the NASCAR schedule because of its distinct features, which include extraordinarily steep banking combined with short length, an all concrete surface, two pit roads, and stadium-like seating.

In 2021, the race shifted to a dirt surface version of the track and was renamed the Food City Dirt Race.

On September 15, 2023, Bristol Motor Speedway announced that the race would return to being run on concrete.

==== Entry list ====
- (R) denotes rookie driver.
- (i) denotes driver who is ineligible for series driver points.

#	Driver	Team	Make
1	William Sawalich	Tricon Garage	Toyota
02	Mason Massey	Young's Motorsports	Chevrolet
2	Nick Sanchez	Rev Racing	Chevrolet
5	Dean Thompson	Tricon Garage	Toyota
7	Kyle Busch (i)	Spire Motorsports	Chevrolet
9	Grant Enfinger	CR7 Motorsports	Chevrolet
11	Corey Heim	Tricon Garage	Toyota
13	Jake Garcia	ThorSport Racing	Ford
14	Trey Hutchens	Trey Hutchens Racing	Chevrolet
15	Tanner Gray	Tricon Garage	Toyota
17	Taylor Gray	Tricon Garage	Toyota
18	Tyler Ankrum	McAnally-Hilgemann Racing	Chevrolet
19	Christian Eckes	McAnally-Hilgemann Racing	Chevrolet
21	Mason Maggio	Floridian Motorsports	Ford
22	Keith McGee	Reaume Brothers Racing	Ford
25	Ty Dillon	Rackley WAR	Chevrolet
32	Bret Holmes	Bret Holmes Racing	Chevrolet
33	Lawless Alan	Reaume Brothers Racing	Ford
38	Layne Riggs (R)	Front Row Motorsports	Ford
41	Bayley Currey	Niece Motorsports	Chevrolet
42	Matt Mills	Niece Motorsports	Chevrolet
43	Daniel Dye	McAnally-Hilgemann Racing	Chevrolet
45	Kaden Honeycutt	Niece Motorsports	Chevrolet
46	Thad Moffitt (R)	Faction46	Chevrolet
52	Stewart Friesen	Halmar Friesen Racing	Toyota
56	Timmy Hill	Hill Motorsports	Toyota
66	Conner Jones (R)	ThorSport Racing	Ford
71	Rajah Caruth	Spire Motorsports	Chevrolet
75	Stefan Parsons	Henderson Motorsports	Chevrolet
76	Spencer Boyd	Freedom Racing Enterprises	Chevrolet
77	Chase Purdy	Spire Motorsports	Chevrolet
88	Matt Crafton	ThorSport Racing	Ford
90	Justin Carroll	TC Motorsports	Toyota
91	Zane Smith (i)	McAnally-Hilgemann Racing	Chevrolet
98	Ty Majeski	ThorSport Racing	Ford
99	Ben Rhodes	ThorSport Racing	Ford
Official entry list

== Practice ==
Practice was held on Saturday, March 16, at 3:00 PM EST. Since Bristol Motor Speedway is a short track, drivers were split into two groups, Group A and B, with both sessions being 15 minutes long. Christian Eckes, driving for McAnally-Hilgemann Racing, was the fastest driver between both groups, with a lap of 15.553, and a speed of 123.372 mph (198.548 km/h).

Pos.	#	Driver	Team	Make	Time	Speed
1	19	Christian Eckes	McAnally-Hilgemann Racing	Chevrolet	15.553	123.372
2	66	Conner Jones (R)	ThorSport Racing	Ford	15.576	123.190
3	2	Nick Sanchez	Rev Racing	Chevrolet	15.584	123.126
Full practice results

== Qualifying ==
Qualifying was held on Saturday, March 16, at 3:40 PM EST. Since Bristol Motor Speedway is a short track, the qualifying system used is a single-car, two-lap system with only one round. Whoever sets the fastest time in that round will win the pole.

Christian Eckes, driving for McAnally-Hilgemann Racing, would score the pole for the race, with a lap of 15.122, and a speed of 126.888 mph (204.206 km/h).

No drivers would fail to qualify.

=== Qualifying results ===
Pos.	#	Driver	Team	Make	Time	Speed
1	19	Christian Eckes	McAnally-Hilgemann Racing	Chevrolet	15.122	126.888
2	2	Nick Sanchez	Rev Racing	Chevrolet	15.203	126.212
3	17	Taylor Gray	Tricon Garage	Toyota	15.264	125.708
4	7	Kyle Busch (i)	Spire Motorsports	Chevrolet	15.270	125.658
5	98	Ty Majeski	ThorSport Racing	Ford	15.276	125.609
6	71	Rajah Caruth	Spire Motorsports	Chevrolet	15.290	125.494
7	91	Zane Smith (i)	McAnally-Hilgemann Racing	Chevrolet	15.294	125.461
8	45	Kaden Honeycutt	Niece Motorsports	Chevrolet	15.299	125.420
9	18	Tyler Ankrum	McAnally-Hilgemann Racing	Chevrolet	15.333	125.142
10	43	Daniel Dye	McAnally-Hilgemann Racing	Chevrolet	15.335	125.126
11	77	Chase Purdy	Spire Motorsports	Chevrolet	15.337	125.109
12	41	Bayley Currey	Niece Motorsports	Chevrolet	15.341	125.077
13	9	Grant Enfinger	CR7 Motorsports	Chevrolet	15.342	125.068
14	66	Conner Jones (R)	ThorSport Racing	Ford	15.350	125.003
15	11	Corey Heim	Tricon Garage	Toyota	15.385	124.719
16	99	Ben Rhodes	ThorSport Racing	Ford	15.406	124.549
17	13	Jake Garcia	ThorSport Racing	Ford	15.431	124.347
18	42	Matt Mills	Niece Motorsports	Chevrolet	15.442	124.259
19	1	William Sawalich	Tricon Garage	Toyota	15.451	124.186
20	88	Matt Crafton	ThorSport Racing	Ford	15.472	124.018
21	15	Tanner Gray	Tricon Garage	Toyota	15.478	123.970
22	5	Dean Thompson	Tricon Garage	Toyota	15.498	123.810
23	52	Stewart Friesen	Halmar Friesen Racing	Toyota	15.527	123.578
24	32	Bret Holmes	Bret Holmes Racing	Chevrolet	15.554	123.364
25	75	Stefan Parsons	Henderson Motorsports	Chevrolet	15.558	123.332
26	25	Ty Dillon	Rackley WAR	Chevrolet	15.602	122.984
27	56	Timmy Hill	Hill Motorsports	Toyota	15.712	122.123
28	38	Layne Riggs (R)	Front Row Motorsports	Ford	15.716	122.092
29	33	Lawless Alan	Reaume Brothers Racing	Ford	15.725	122.022
30	76	Spencer Boyd	Freedom Racing Enterprises	Chevrolet	15.839	121.144
31	02	Mason Massey	Young's Motorsports	Chevrolet	15.879	120.839
Qualified by owner's points
32	90	Justin Carroll	TC Motorsports	Toyota	15.943	120.354
33	46	Thad Moffitt (R)	Faction46	Chevrolet	15.970	120.150
34	22	Keith McGee	Reaume Brothers Racing	Ford	16.096	119.210
35	14	Trey Hutchens	Trey Hutchens Racing	Chevrolet	16.328	117.516
36	21	Mason Maggio	Floridian Motorsports	Ford	–	–
Official qualifying results
Official starting lineup

== Race results ==
Stage 1 Laps: 65

Pos.	#	Driver	Team	Make	Pts
1	7	Kyle Busch (i)	Spire Motorsports	Chevrolet	0
2	19	Christian Eckes	McAnally-Hilgemann Racing	Chevrolet	9
3	2	Nick Sanchez	Rev Racing	Chevrolet	8
4	98	Ty Majeski	ThorSport Racing	Ford	7
5	91	Zane Smith (i)	McAnally-Hilgemann Racing	Chevrolet	0
6	17	Taylor Gray	Tricon Garage	Toyota	5
7	18	Tyler Ankrum	McAnally-Hilgemann Racing	Chevrolet	4
8	99	Ben Rhodes	ThorSport Racing	Ford	3
9	45	Kaden Honeycutt	Niece Motorsports	Chevrolet	2
10	9	Grant Enfinger	CR7 Motorsports	Chevrolet	1

Stage 2 Laps: 65

Pos.	#	Driver	Team	Make	Pts
1	7	Kyle Busch (i)	Spire Motorsports	Chevrolet	0
2	2	Nick Sanchez	Rev Racing	Chevrolet	9
3	19	Christian Eckes	McAnally-Hilgemann Racing	Chevrolet	8
4	98	Ty Majeski	ThorSport Racing	Ford	7
5	91	Zane Smith (i)	McAnally-Hilgemann Racing	Chevrolet	0
6	18	Tyler Ankrum	McAnally-Hilgemann Racing	Chevrolet	5
7	52	Stewart Friesen	Halmar Friesen Racing	Toyota	4
8	88	Matt Crafton	ThorSport Racing	Ford	3
9	99	Ben Rhodes	ThorSport Racing	Ford	2
10	38	Layne Riggs (R)	Front Row Motorsports	Ford	1

Stage 3 Laps: 120

Fin	St	#	Driver	Team	Make	Laps	Led	Status	Pts
1	1	19	Christian Eckes	McAnally-Hilgemann Racing	Chevrolet	250	144	Running	57
2	4	7	Kyle Busch (i)	Spire Motorsports	Chevrolet	250	105	Running	0
3	7	91	Zane Smith (i)	McAnally-Hilgemann Racing	Chevrolet	250	1	Running	0
4	20	88	Matt Crafton	ThorSport Racing	Ford	250	0	Running	36
5	9	18	Tyler Ankrum	McAnally-Hilgemann Racing	Chevrolet	250	0	Running	41
6	15	11	Corey Heim	Tricon Garage	Toyota	250	0	Running	31
7	3	17	Taylor Gray	Tricon Garage	Toyota	250	0	Running	35
8	6	71	Rajah Caruth	Spire Motorsports	Chevrolet	250	0	Running	29
9	13	9	Grant Enfinger	CR7 Motorsports	Chevrolet	250	0	Running	29
10	28	38	Layne Riggs (R)	Front Row Motorsports	Ford	250	0	Running	28
11	12	41	Bayley Currey	Niece Motorsports	Chevrolet	250	0	Running	26
12	8	45	Kaden Honeycutt	Niece Motorsports	Chevrolet	250	0	Running	27
13	10	43	Daniel Dye	McAnally-Hilgemann Racing	Chevrolet	250	0	Running	24
14	17	13	Jake Garcia	ThorSport Racing	Ford	250	0	Running	23
15	21	15	Tanner Gray	Tricon Garage	Toyota	250	0	Running	22
16	16	99	Ben Rhodes	ThorSport Racing	Ford	250	0	Running	26
17	2	2	Nick Sanchez	Rev Racing	Chevrolet	250	0	Running	37
18	25	75	Stefan Parsons	Henderson Motorsports	Chevrolet	249	0	Running	19
19	14	66	Conner Jones (R)	ThorSport Racing	Ford	249	0	Running	18
20	26	25	Ty Dillon	Rackley WAR	Chevrolet	249	0	Running	17
21	19	1	William Sawalich	Tricon Garage	Toyota	248	0	Running	16
22	23	52	Stewart Friesen	Halmar Friesen Racing	Toyota	248	0	Running	19
23	22	5	Dean Thompson	Tricon Garage	Toyota	247	0	Running	14
24	27	56	Timmy Hill	Hill Motorsports	Toyota	247	0	Running	13
25	18	42	Matt Mills	Niece Motorsports	Chevrolet	247	0	Running	12
26	33	46	Thad Moffitt (R)	Faction46	Chevrolet	246	0	Running	11
27	29	33	Lawless Alan	Reaume Brothers Racing	Ford	246	0	Running	10
28	31	02	Mason Massey	Young's Motorsports	Chevrolet	245	0	Running	9
29	36	21	Mason Maggio	Floridian Motorsports	Ford	244	0	Running	8
30	30	76	Spencer Boyd	Freedom Racing Enterprises	Chevrolet	242	0	Running	7
31	24	32	Bret Holmes	Bret Holmes Racing	Chevrolet	242	0	Running	6
32	34	22	Keith McGee	Reaume Brothers Racing	Ford	238	0	Running	5
33	11	77	Chase Purdy	Spire Motorsports	Chevrolet	228	0	Running	4
34	5	98	Ty Majeski	ThorSport Racing	Ford	170	0	Engine	17
35	35	14	Trey Hutchens	Trey Hutchens Racing	Chevrolet	113	0	Suspension	2
36	32	90	Justin Carroll	TC Motorsports	Toyota	57	0	Brakes	1
Official race results

== Standings after the race ==
Drivers' Championship standings

	Pos	Driver	Points
	1	Tyler Ankrum	174
1	2	Corey Heim	157 (-17)
1	3	Rajah Caruth	152 (–22)
2	4	Ty Majeski	145 (–29)
4	5	Christian Eckes	142 (–32)
1	6	Nick Sanchez	141 (–33)
1	7	Taylor Gray	138 (–36)
1	8	Matt Crafton	130 (–44)
1	9	Grant Enfinger	114 (–60)
2	10	Bret Holmes	95 (–79)
Official driver's standings

Manufacturers' Championship standings

Pos	Manufacturer	Points
1	Chevrolet	160
2	Toyota	133 (–27)
3	Ford	127 (–33)

- Note: Only the first 10 positions are included for the driver standings.

Previous race: 2024 Victoria's Voice Foundation 200	NASCAR Craftsman Truck Series; 2024 season	Next race: 2024 XPEL 225
