= 2024 Victoria's Voice Foundation 200 =

3rd race of the 2024 NASCAR Craftsman Truck Series

2024 Victoria's Voice Foundation 200 presented by Westgate Resorts
Race details
- Race 3 of 23 of the 2024 NASCAR Craftsman Truck Series
- Date: March 1, 2024
- Official name: 7th Annual Victoria's Voice Foundation 200 presented by Westgate Resorts
- Location: Las Vegas Motor Speedway in North Las Vegas, Nevada
- Course: Permanent racing facility
- Course length: 1.5 miles (2.4 km)
- Distance: 134 laps, 201 mi (323 km)
- Scheduled distance: 134 laps, 201 mi (323 km)
- Average speed: 129.910 mph (209.070 km/h)

Pole position
Driver	Rajah Caruth	Spire Motorsports
- Time: 30.501

Most laps led
Driver	Ty Majeski	ThorSport Racing
- Laps: 40

Winner
No. 71	Rajah Caruth	Spire Motorsports

Television in the United States
- Network: FS1
- Announcers: Jamie Little, Phil Parsons, and Michael Waltrip

Radio in the United States
- Radio: MRN

The 2024 Victoria's Voice Foundation 200 presented by Westgate Resorts was the 3rd stock car race of the 2024 NASCAR Craftsman Truck Series, and the 16th iteration of the event. The race was held on Friday, March 1, 2024, at Las Vegas Motor Speedway in North Las Vegas, Nevada, a 1.5 miles (2.4 km) permanent asphalt quad-oval shaped intermediate speedway. The race took the scheduled 134 laps to complete. Rajah Caruth, driving for Spire Motorsports, would take the historic win, after a successful pit road strategy which allowed him to take the lead on lap 114. With his win, he became the third African-American driver to win a NASCAR national series race, following Wendell Scott and Bubba Wallace. Ty Majeski had the most consistent run of the race, who won both stages and led a race-high 40 laps, but suffered from a pit road speeding penalty on the final pair of green flag pit stops. To fill out the podium, Tyler Ankrum, driving for McAnally-Hilgemann Racing, and Corey Heim, driving for Tricon Garage, would finish 2nd and 3rd, respectively.

== Report ==
=== Background ===
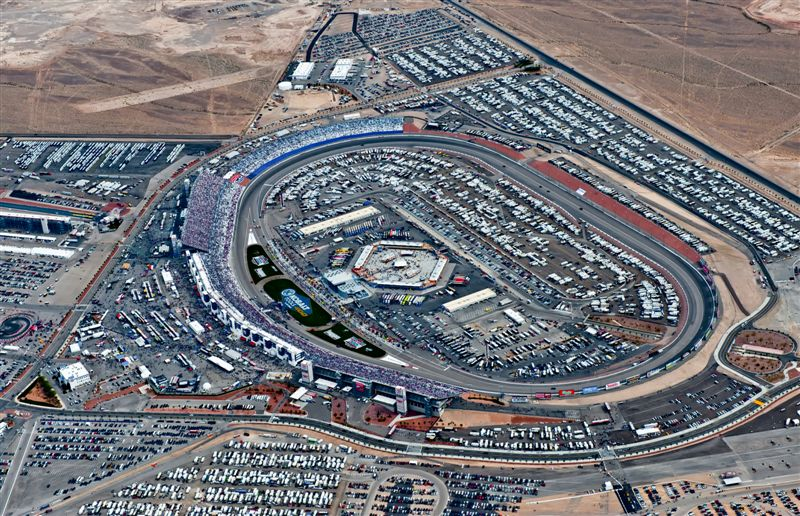
Las Vegas Motor Speedway, the circuit where the race will be held.

Las Vegas Motor Speedway, located in Clark County, Nevada outside the Las Vegas city limits and about 15 miles northeast of the Las Vegas Strip, is a 1,200-acre (490 ha) complex of multiple tracks for motorsports racing. The complex is owned by Speedway Motorsports, Inc., which is headquartered in Charlotte, North Carolina.

==== Entry list ====
- (R) denotes rookie driver.
- (i) denotes driver who is ineligible for series driver points.

#	Driver	Team	Make
1	Christopher Bell (i)	Tricon Garage	Toyota
02	Mason Massey	Young's Motorsports	Chevrolet
2	Nick Sanchez	Rev Racing	Chevrolet
5	Dean Thompson	Tricon Garage	Toyota
7	Kyle Busch (i)	Spire Motorsports	Chevrolet
9	Grant Enfinger	CR7 Motorsports	Chevrolet
11	Corey Heim	Tricon Garage	Toyota
13	Jake Garcia	ThorSport Racing	Ford
15	Tanner Gray	Tricon Garage	Toyota
17	Taylor Gray	Tricon Garage	Toyota
18	Tyler Ankrum	McAnally-Hilgemann Racing	Chevrolet
19	Christian Eckes	McAnally-Hilgemann Racing	Chevrolet
22	Keith McGee	Reaume Brothers Racing	Ford
25	Ty Dillon	Rackley WAR	Chevrolet
32	Bret Holmes	Bret Holmes Racing	Chevrolet
33	Lawless Alan	Reaume Brothers Racing	Ford
38	Layne Riggs (R)	Front Row Motorsports	Ford
41	Bayley Currey	Niece Motorsports	Chevrolet
42	Matt Mills	Niece Motorsports	Chevrolet
43	Daniel Dye	McAnally-Hilgemann Racing	Chevrolet
45	Connor Mosack	Niece Motorsports	Chevrolet
46	Thad Moffitt (R)	Faction46	Chevrolet
52	Stewart Friesen	Halmar Friesen Racing	Toyota
56	Timmy Hill	Hill Motorsports	Toyota
66	Conner Jones (R)	ThorSport Racing	Ford
71	Rajah Caruth	Spire Motorsports	Chevrolet
76	Spencer Boyd	Freedom Racing Enterprises	Chevrolet
77	Chase Purdy	Spire Motorsports	Chevrolet
88	Matt Crafton	ThorSport Racing	Ford
91	Zane Smith (i)	McAnally-Hilgemann Racing	Chevrolet
98	Ty Majeski	ThorSport Racing	Ford
99	Ben Rhodes	ThorSport Racing	Ford
Official entry list

== Practice ==
The first and only practice session was held on Friday, March 1, at 1:35 pm PST, and would last for 20 minutes. Tyler Ankrum, driving for McAnally-Hilgemann Racing, would set the fastest time in the session, with a lap of 30.775, and a speed of 175.467 mph (282.387 km/h).

Pos.	#	Driver	Team	Make	Time	Speed
1	18	Tyler Ankrum	McAnally-Hilgemann Racing	Chevrolet	30.775	175.467
2	19	Christian Eckes	McAnally-Hilgemann Racing	Chevrolet	30.843	175.080
3	7	Kyle Busch (i)	Spire Motorsports	Chevrolet	30.921	174.639
Full practice results

== Qualifying ==
Qualifying was held on Friday, March 1, at 2:05 pm PST. Since Las Vegas Motor Speedway is an intermediate speedway, the qualifying system used is a single-car, single-lap system with only one round. Whoever sets the fastest time in that round will win the pole.

Rajah Caruth, driving for Spire Motorsports, would score the pole for the race, with a lap of 30.501, and a speed of 177.043 mph (284.923 km/h).

No drivers would fail to qualify.

=== Qualifying results ===
Pos.	#	Driver	Team	Make	Time	Speed
1	71	Rajah Caruth	Spire Motorsports	Chevrolet	30.501	177.043
2	19	Christian Eckes	McAnally-Hilgemann Racing	Chevrolet	30.502	177.038
3	52	Stewart Friesen	Halmar Friesen Racing	Toyota	30.580	176.586
4	7	Kyle Busch (i)	Spire Motorsports	Chevrolet	30.582	176.574
5	18	Tyler Ankrum	McAnally-Hilgemann Racing	Chevrolet	30.616	176.378
6	98	Ty Majeski	ThorSport Racing	Ford	30.670	176.068
7	91	Zane Smith (i)	McAnally-Hilgemann Racing	Chevrolet	30.701	175.890
8	2	Nick Sanchez	Rev Racing	Chevrolet	30.741	175.661
9	43	Daniel Dye	McAnally-Hilgemann Racing	Chevrolet	30.752	175.598
10	9	Grant Enfinger	CR7 Motorsports	Chevrolet	30.760	175.553
11	77	Chase Purdy	Spire Motorsports	Chevrolet	30.761	175.547
12	13	Jake Garcia	ThorSport Racing	Ford	30.804	175.302
13	99	Ben Rhodes	ThorSport Racing	Ford	30.830	175.154
14	1	Christopher Bell (i)	Tricon Garage	Toyota	30.832	175.143
15	88	Matt Crafton	ThorSport Racing	Ford	30.837	175.114
16	25	Ty Dillon	Rackley WAR	Chevrolet	30.878	174.882
17	41	Bayley Currey	Niece Motorsports	Chevrolet	30.922	174.633
18	45	Connor Mosack	Niece Motorsports	Chevrolet	30.927	174.605
19	17	Taylor Gray	Tricon Garage	Toyota	30.964	174.396
20	32	Bret Holmes	Bret Holmes Racing	Chevrolet	30.974	174.340
21	38	Layne Riggs (R)	Front Row Motorsports	Ford	30.990	174.250
22	42	Matt Mills	Niece Motorsports	Chevrolet	31.025	174.053
23	5	Dean Thompson	Tricon Garage	Toyota	31.030	174.025
24	15	Tanner Gray	Tricon Garage	Toyota	31.051	173.907
25	11	Corey Heim	Tricon Garage	Toyota	31.063	173.840
26	66	Conner Jones (R)	ThorSport Racing	Ford	31.105	173.606
27	56	Timmy Hill	Hill Motorsports	Toyota	31.154	173.332
28	33	Lawless Alan	Reaume Brothers Racing	Ford	31.474	171.570
29	02	Mason Massey	Young's Motorsports	Chevrolet	31.528	171.276
30	46	Thad Moffitt (R)	Faction46	Chevrolet	31.565	171.076
31	22	Keith McGee	Reaume Brothers Racing	Ford	31.690	170.401
Qualified by owner's points
32	76	Spencer Boyd	Freedom Racing Enterprises	Chevrolet	32.348	166.935
Official qualifying results
Official starting lineup

== Race results ==
Stage 1 Laps: 30

Pos.	#	Driver	Team	Make	Pts
1	98	Ty Majeski	ThorSport Racing	Ford	10
2	71	Rajah Caruth	Spire Motorsports	Chevrolet	9
3	52	Stewart Friesen	Halmar Friesen Racing	Toyota	8
4	18	Tyler Ankrum	McAnally-Hilgemann Racing	Chevrolet	7
5	11	Corey Heim	Tricon Garage	Toyota	6
6	1	Christopher Bell (i)	Tricon Garage	Toyota	0
7	17	Taylor Gray	Tricon Garage	Toyota	4
8	7	Kyle Busch (i)	Spire Motorsports	Chevrolet	0
9	9	Grant Enfinger	CR7 Motorsports	Chevrolet	2
10	88	Matt Crafton	ThorSport Racing	Ford	1

Stage 2 Laps: 30

Pos.	#	Driver	Team	Make	Pts
1	98	Ty Majeski	ThorSport Racing	Ford	10
2	11	Corey Heim	Tricon Garage	Toyota	9
3	71	Rajah Caruth	Spire Motorsports	Chevrolet	8
4	17	Taylor Gray	Tricon Garage	Toyota	7
5	7	Kyle Busch (i)	Spire Motorsports	Chevrolet	0
6	2	Nick Sanchez	Rev Racing	Chevrolet	5
7	9	Grant Enfinger	CR7 Motorsports	Chevrolet	4
8	91	Zane Smith (i)	McAnally-Hilgemann Racing	Chevrolet	0
9	52	Stewart Friesen	Halmar Friesen Racing	Toyota	2
10	88	Matt Crafton	ThorSport Racing	Ford	1

Stage 3 Laps: 74

Fin	St	#	Driver	Team	Make	Laps	Led	Status	Pts
1	1	71	Rajah Caruth	Spire Motorsports	Chevrolet	134	38	Running	57
2	5	18	Tyler Ankrum	McAnally-Hilgemann Racing	Chevrolet	134	0	Running	42
3	25	11	Corey Heim	Tricon Garage	Toyota	134	18	Running	49
4	19	17	Taylor Gray	Tricon Garage	Toyota	134	4	Running	44
5	14	1	Christopher Bell (i)	Tricon Garage	Toyota	134	2	Running	0
6	2	19	Christian Eckes	McAnally-Hilgemann Racing	Chevrolet	134	7	Running	31
7	15	88	Matt Crafton	ThorSport Racing	Ford	134	0	Running	32
8	7	91	Zane Smith (i)	McAnally-Hilgemann Racing	Chevrolet	134	0	Running	0
9	10	9	Grant Enfinger	CR7 Motorsports	Chevrolet	134	0	Running	34
10	6	98	Ty Majeski	ThorSport Racing	Ford	134	40	Running	47
11	12	13	Jake Garcia	ThorSport Racing	Ford	134	0	Running	26
12	20	32	Bret Holmes	Bret Holmes Racing	Chevrolet	134	0	Running	25
13	13	99	Ben Rhodes	ThorSport Racing	Ford	134	0	Running	24
14	26	66	Conner Jones (R)	ThorSport Racing	Ford	133	0	Running	23
15	4	7	Kyle Busch (i)	Spire Motorsports	Chevrolet	133	13	Running	0
16	11	77	Chase Purdy	Spire Motorsports	Chevrolet	133	1	Running	21
17	8	2	Nick Sanchez	Rev Racing	Chevrolet	133	5	Running	25
18	3	52	Stewart Friesen	Halmar Friesen Racing	Toyota	133	0	Running	29
19	18	45	Connor Mosack	Niece Motorsports	Chevrolet	133	0	Running	18
20	24	15	Tanner Gray	Tricon Garage	Toyota	133	0	Running	17
21	29	02	Mason Massey	Young's Motorsports	Chevrolet	133	6	Running	16
22	21	38	Layne Riggs (R)	Front Row Motorsports	Ford	133	0	Running	15
23	28	33	Lawless Alan	Reaume Brothers Racing	Ford	133	0	Running	14
24	9	43	Daniel Dye	McAnally-Hilgemann Racing	Chevrolet	132	0	Running	13
25	30	46	Thad Moffitt (R)	Faction46	Chevrolet	132	0	Running	12
26	16	25	Ty Dillon	Rackley WAR	Chevrolet	132	0	Running	11
27	31	22	Keith McGee	Reaume Brothers Racing	Ford	131	0	Running	10
28	17	41	Bayley Currey	Niece Motorsports	Chevrolet	129	0	Running	9
29	32	76	Spencer Boyd	Freedom Racing Enterprises	Chevrolet	128	0	Running	8
30	23	5	Dean Thompson	Tricon Garage	Toyota	125	0	Running	7
31	22	42	Matt Mills	Niece Motorsports	Chevrolet	125	0	Running	6
32	27	56	Timmy Hill	Hill Motorsports	Toyota	75	0	Electrical	5
Official race results

== Standings after the race ==
Drivers' Championship standings

	Pos	Driver	Points
	1	Tyler Ankrum	133
	2	Ty Majeski	128 (-5)
1	3	Corey Heim	126 (–7)
1	4	Rajah Caruth	123 (–10)
2	5	Nick Sanchez	104 (–29)
2	6	Taylor Gray	103 (–30)
	7	Matt Crafton	94 (–39)
2	8	Bret Holmes	89 (–44)
	9	Christian Eckes	85 (–48)
1	10	Grant Enfinger	85 (–48)
Official driver's standings

Manufacturers' Championship standings

Pos	Manufacturer	Points
1	Chevrolet	120
2	Toyota	102 (–18)
3	Ford	94 (–26)

- Note: Only the first 10 positions are included for the driver standings.

Previous race: 2024 Fr8 208	NASCAR Craftsman Truck Series; 2024 season	Next race: 2024 Weather Guard Truck Race
