= 2024 SpeedyCash.com 250 =

7th race of the 2024 NASCAR Craftsman Truck Series

Race details
- Race 7 of 23 of the 2024 NASCAR Craftsman Truck Series
- Date: April 12, 2024
- Official name: 26th Annual SpeedyCash.com 250
- Location: Texas Motor Speedway in Fort Worth, Texas
- Course: Permanent racing facility
- Course length: 1.5 miles (2.4 km)
- Distance: 167 laps, 250 mi (403 km)
- Scheduled distance: 167 laps, 250 mi (403 km)
- Average speed: 118.471 mph (190.661 km/h)

Pole position
| Driver | Nick Sanchez | Rev Racing |
- Time: 29.219

Most laps led
| Driver | Kyle Busch | Spire Motorsports |
- Laps: 112

Winner
| No. 7 | Kyle Busch | Spire Motorsports |

Television in the United States
- Network: FS1
- Announcers: Jamie Little, Phil Parsons, and Michael Waltrip

Radio in the United States
- Radio: MRN

The 2024 SpeedyCash.com 250 was the 7th stock car race of the 2024 NASCAR Craftsman Truck Series, and the 26th iteration of the event. The race was held on Friday, April 12, 2024, at Texas Motor Speedway in Fort Worth, Texas, a 1.5 miles (2.4 km) permanent asphalt quad-oval shaped intermediate speedway. The race took the scheduled 167 laps to complete. Kyle Busch, driving for Spire Motorsports, would take advantage of the lead on the final restart, and held off a fast charge from Corey Heim in the final few laps to earn his 66th career NASCAR Craftsman Truck Series win, and his second of the season. Busch would also win the race in dominating fashion, winning both stages and leading a race-high 112 laps. With his win, he ties Todd Bodine for the most Truck Series wins at Texas Motor Speedway with six. To fill out the podium, Nick Sanchez, driving for Rev Racing, would finish 3rd, respectively.

== Report ==
=== Background ===
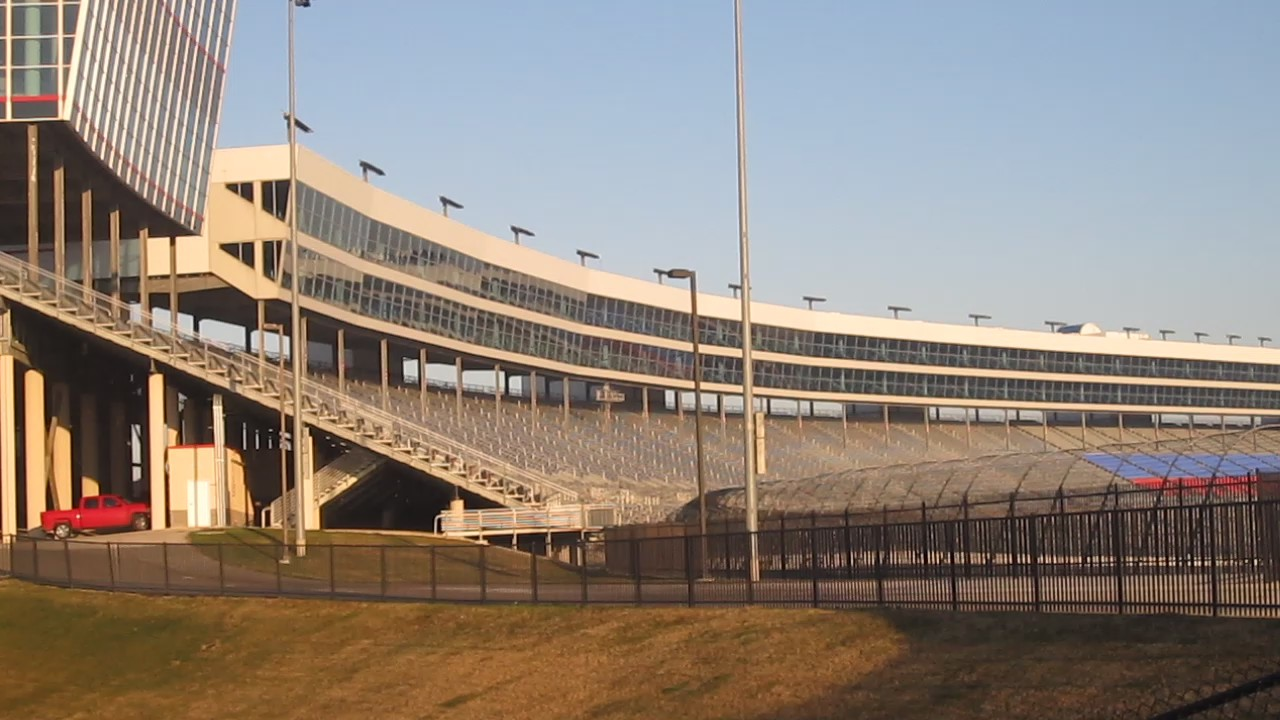
Texas Motor Speedway, the circuit where the race will be held.

Texas Motor Speedway is a speedway located in the northernmost portion of the U.S. city of Fort Worth, Texas – the portion located in Denton County, Texas. The track measures 1.5 miles (2.4 km) around and is banked 24 degrees in the turns, and is of the oval design, where the front straightaway juts outward slightly. The track layout is similar to Atlanta Motor Speedway and Charlotte Motor Speedway (formerly Lowe's Motor Speedway). The track is owned by Speedway Motorsports, Inc., the same company that owns Atlanta and Charlotte Motor Speedway, as well as the short-track Bristol Motor Speedway.

==== Entry list ====
- (R) denotes rookie driver.
- (i) denotes driver who is ineligible for series driver points.

| # | Driver | Team | Make |
|---|---|---|---|
| 1 | Kris Wright | Tricon Garage | Toyota |
| 02 | Mason Massey | Young's Motorsports | Chevrolet |
| 2 | Nick Sanchez | Rev Racing | Chevrolet |
| 5 | Dean Thompson | Tricon Garage | Toyota |
| 7 | Kyle Busch (i) | Spire Motorsports | Chevrolet |
| 9 | Grant Enfinger | CR7 Motorsports | Chevrolet |
| 11 | Corey Heim | Tricon Garage | Toyota |
| 13 | Jake Garcia | ThorSport Racing | Ford |
| 15 | Tanner Gray | Tricon Garage | Toyota |
| 17 | Taylor Gray | Tricon Garage | Toyota |
| 18 | Tyler Ankrum | McAnally-Hilgemann Racing | Chevrolet |
| 19 | Christian Eckes | McAnally-Hilgemann Racing | Chevrolet |
| 20 | Memphis Villarreal | Young's Motorsports | Chevrolet |
| 22 | Keith McGee | Reaume Brothers Racing | Ford |
| 25 | Ty Dillon | Rackley WAR | Chevrolet |
| 32 | Bret Holmes | Bret Holmes Racing | Chevrolet |
| 33 | Lawless Alan | Reaume Brothers Racing | Ford |
| 38 | Layne Riggs (R) | Front Row Motorsports | Ford |
| 41 | Bayley Currey | Niece Motorsports | Chevrolet |
| 42 | Matt Mills | Niece Motorsports | Chevrolet |
| 43 | Daniel Dye | McAnally-Hilgemann Racing | Chevrolet |
| 45 | Johnny Sauter | Niece Motorsports | Chevrolet |
| 46 | Thad Moffitt (R) | Faction46 | Chevrolet |
| 52 | Stewart Friesen | Halmar Friesen Racing | Toyota |
| 56 | Timmy Hill | Hill Motorsports | Toyota |
| 66 | Conner Jones (R) | ThorSport Racing | Ford |
| 71 | Rajah Caruth | Spire Motorsports | Chevrolet |
| 75 | Stefan Parsons | Henderson Motorsports | Chevrolet |
| 76 | Spencer Boyd | Freedom Racing Enterprises | Chevrolet |
| 77 | Chase Purdy | Spire Motorsports | Chevrolet |
| 88 | Matt Crafton | ThorSport Racing | Ford |
| 91 | Zane Smith (i) | McAnally-Hilgemann Racing | Chevrolet |
| 98 | Ty Majeski | ThorSport Racing | Ford |
| 99 | Ben Rhodes | ThorSport Racing | Ford |
Official entry list

== Practice ==
The first and only practice was held on Friday, April 12, at 3:05 PM CST, and would last for 20 minutes. Rajah Caruth, driving for Spire Motorsports, would set the fastest time in the session, with a lap of 29.863, and a speed of 180.826 mph (291.011 km/h).

| Pos. | # | Driver | Team | Make | Time | Speed |
|---|---|---|---|---|---|---|
| 1 | 71 | Rajah Caruth | Spire Motorsports | Chevrolet | 29.863 | 180.826 |
| 2 | 18 | Tyler Ankrum | McAnally-Hilgemann Racing | Chevrolet | 29.867 | 180.802 |
| 3 | 42 | Matt Mills | Niece Motorsports | Chevrolet | 29.906 | 180.566 |
Full practice results

== Qualifying ==
Qualifying was held on Friday, April 12, at 3:35 PM CST. Since Texas Motor Speedway is an intermediate speedway, the qualifying system used is a single-car, one-lap system with only one round. Drivers will be on track by themselves and will have one lap to post a qualifying time. Whoever sets the fastest time in that round will win the pole.

Nick Sanchez, driving for Rev Racing, would score the pole for the race, with a lap of 29.219, and a speed of 184.811 mph (297.424 km/h).

No drivers would fail to qualify.

=== Qualifying results ===
| Pos. | # | Driver | Team | Make | Time | Speed |
|---|---|---|---|---|---|---|
| 1 | 2 | Nick Sanchez | Rev Racing | Chevrolet | 29.219 | 184.811 |
| 2 | 19 | Christian Eckes | McAnally-Hilgemann Racing | Chevrolet | 29.290 | 184.363 |
| 3 | 52 | Stewart Friesen | Halmar Friesen Racing | Toyota | 29.341 | 184.043 |
| 4 | 7 | Kyle Busch (i) | Spire Motorsports | Chevrolet | 29.346 | 184.011 |
| 5 | 9 | Grant Enfinger | CR7 Motorsports | Chevrolet | 29.401 | 183.667 |
| 6 | 43 | Daniel Dye | McAnally-Hilgemann Racing | Chevrolet | 29.430 | 183.486 |
| 7 | 38 | Layne Riggs (R) | Front Row Motorsports | Ford | 29.462 | 183.287 |
| 8 | 41 | Bayley Currey | Niece Motorsports | Chevrolet | 29.475 | 183.206 |
| 9 | 17 | Taylor Gray | Tricon Garage | Toyota | 29.485 | 183.144 |
| 10 | 71 | Rajah Caruth | Spire Motorsports | Chevrolet | 29.486 | 183.138 |
| 11 | 98 | Ty Majeski | ThorSport Racing | Ford | 29.524 | 182.902 |
| 12 | 91 | Zane Smith (i) | McAnally-Hilgemann Racing | Chevrolet | 29.540 | 182.803 |
| 13 | 13 | Jake Garcia | ThorSport Racing | Ford | 29.548 | 182.753 |
| 14 | 11 | Corey Heim | Tricon Garage | Toyota | 29.552 | 182.729 |
| 15 | 77 | Chase Purdy | Spire Motorsports | Chevrolet | 29.612 | 182.359 |
| 16 | 66 | Conner Jones (R) | ThorSport Racing | Ford | 29.660 | 182.063 |
| 17 | 5 | Dean Thompson | Tricon Garage | Toyota | 29.677 | 181.959 |
| 18 | 45 | Johnny Sauter | Niece Motorsports | Chevrolet | 29.693 | 181.861 |
| 19 | 99 | Ben Rhodes | ThorSport Racing | Ford | 29.718 | 181.708 |
| 20 | 42 | Matt Mills | Niece Motorsports | Chevrolet | 29.778 | 181.342 |
| 21 | 33 | Lawless Alan | Reaume Brothers Racing | Ford | 29.780 | 181.330 |
| 22 | 88 | Matt Crafton | ThorSport Racing | Ford | 29.854 | 180.880 |
| 23 | 46 | Thad Moffitt (R) | Faction46 | Chevrolet | 29.886 | 180.687 |
| 24 | 25 | Ty Dillon | Rackley WAR | Chevrolet | 29.971 | 180.174 |
| 25 | 75 | Stefan Parsons | Henderson Motorsports | Chevrolet | 29.981 | 180.114 |
| 26 | 1 | Kris Wright | Tricon Garage | Toyota | 29.999 | 180.006 |
| 27 | 32 | Bret Holmes | Bret Holmes Racing | Chevrolet | 30.247 | 178.530 |
| 28 | 76 | Spencer Boyd | Freedom Racing Enterprises | Chevrolet | 30.342 | 177.971 |
| 29 | 02 | Mason Massey | Young's Motorsports | Chevrolet | 30.344 | 177.959 |
| 30 | 56 | Timmy Hill | Hill Motorsports | Toyota | 30.449 | 177.346 |
| 31 | 20 | Memphis Villarreal | Young's Motorsports | Chevrolet | 31.079 | 173.500 |
Qualified by owner's points
| 32 | 22 | Keith McGee | Reaume Brothers Racing | Ford | 31.124 | 173.500 |
| 33 | 18 | Tyler Ankrum | McAnally-Hilgemann Racing | Chevrolet | – | – |
| 34 | 15 | Tanner Gray | Tricon Garage | Toyota | – | – |
Official qualifying results
Official starting lineup

== Race results ==
Stage 1 Laps: 40

| Pos. | # | Driver | Team | Make | Pts |
|---|---|---|---|---|---|
| 1 | 7 | Kyle Busch (i) | Spire Motorsports | Chevrolet | 0 |
| 2 | 19 | Christian Eckes | McAnally-Hilgemann Racing | Chevrolet | 9 |
| 3 | 2 | Nick Sanchez | Rev Racing | Chevrolet | 8 |
| 4 | 91 | Zane Smith (i) | McAnally-Hilgemann Racing | Chevrolet | 0 |
| 5 | 52 | Stewart Friesen | Halmar Friesen Racing | Toyota | 6 |
| 6 | 43 | Daniel Dye | McAnally-Hilgemann Racing | Chevrolet | 5 |
| 7 | 38 | Layne Riggs (R) | Front Row Motorsports | Ford | 4 |
| 8 | 9 | Grant Enfinger | CR7 Motorsports | Chevrolet | 3 |
| 9 | 11 | Corey Heim | Tricon Garage | Toyota | 2 |
| 10 | 17 | Taylor Gray | Tricon Garage | Toyota | 1 |

Stage 2 Laps: 40

| Pos. | # | Driver | Team | Make | Pts |
|---|---|---|---|---|---|
| 1 | 7 | Kyle Busch (i) | Spire Motorsports | Chevrolet | 0 |
| 2 | 2 | Nick Sanchez | Rev Racing | Chevrolet | 9 |
| 3 | 19 | Christian Eckes | McAnally-Hilgemann Racing | Chevrolet | 8 |
| 4 | 11 | Corey Heim | Tricon Garage | Toyota | 7 |
| 5 | 17 | Taylor Gray | Tricon Garage | Toyota | 6 |
| 6 | 38 | Layne Riggs (R) | Front Row Motorsports | Ford | 5 |
| 7 | 91 | Zane Smith (i) | McAnally-Hilgemann Racing | Chevrolet | 0 |
| 8 | 43 | Daniel Dye | McAnally-Hilgemann Racing | Chevrolet | 3 |
| 9 | 9 | Grant Enfinger | CR7 Motorsports | Chevrolet | 2 |
| 10 | 45 | Johnny Sauter | Niece Motorsports | Chevrolet | 1 |

Stage 3 Laps: 87

| Fin | St | # | Driver | Team | Make | Laps | Led | Status | Pts |
|---|---|---|---|---|---|---|---|---|---|
| 1 | 4 | 7 | Kyle Busch (i) | Spire Motorsports | Chevrolet | 167 | 112 | Running | 0 |
| 2 | 14 | 11 | Corey Heim | Tricon Garage | Toyota | 167 | 0 | Running | 44 |
| 3 | 1 | 2 | Nick Sanchez | Rev Racing | Chevrolet | 167 | 16 | Running | 51 |
| 4 | 2 | 19 | Christian Eckes | McAnally-Hilgemann Racing | Chevrolet | 167 | 31 | Running | 50 |
| 5 | 12 | 91 | Zane Smith (i) | McAnally-Hilgemann Racing | Chevrolet | 167 | 8 | Running | 0 |
| 6 | 6 | 43 | Daniel Dye | McAnally-Hilgemann Racing | Chevrolet | 167 | 0 | Running | 39 |
| 7 | 9 | 17 | Taylor Gray | Tricon Garage | Toyota | 167 | 0 | Running | 37 |
| 8 | 34 | 15 | Tanner Gray | Tricon Garage | Toyota | 167 | 0 | Running | 29 |
| 9 | 25 | 75 | Stefan Parsons | Henderson Motorsports | Chevrolet | 167 | 0 | Running | 28 |
| 10 | 11 | 98 | Ty Majeski | ThorSport Racing | Ford | 167 | 0 | Running | 27 |
| 11 | 21 | 33 | Lawless Alan | Reaume Brothers Racing | Ford | 167 | 0 | Running | 26 |
| 12 | 10 | 71 | Rajah Caruth | Spire Motorsports | Chevrolet | 167 | 0 | Running | 25 |
| 13 | 3 | 52 | Stewart Friesen | Halmar Friesen Racing | Toyota | 167 | 0 | Running | 30 |
| 14 | 8 | 41 | Bayley Currey | Niece Motorsports | Chevrolet | 167 | 0 | Running | 23 |
| 15 | 22 | 88 | Matt Crafton | ThorSport Racing | Ford | 167 | 0 | Running | 22 |
| 16 | 17 | 5 | Dean Thompson | Tricon Garage | Toyota | 167 | 0 | Running | 21 |
| 17 | 18 | 45 | Johnny Sauter | Niece Motorsports | Chevrolet | 167 | 0 | Running | 21 |
| 18 | 16 | 66 | Conner Jones (R) | ThorSport Racing | Ford | 166 | 0 | Running | 19 |
| 19 | 13 | 13 | Jake Garcia | ThorSport Racing | Ford | 166 | 0 | Running | 18 |
| 20 | 29 | 02 | Mason Massey | Young's Motorsports | Chevrolet | 166 | 0 | Running | 17 |
| 21 | 30 | 56 | Timmy Hill | Hill Motorsports | Toyota | 166 | 0 | Running | 16 |
| 22 | 27 | 32 | Bret Holmes | Bret Holmes Racing | Chevrolet | 166 | 0 | Running | 15 |
| 23 | 24 | 25 | Ty Dillon | Rackley WAR | Chevrolet | 166 | 0 | Running | 14 |
| 24 | 19 | 99 | Ben Rhodes | ThorSport Racing | Ford | 165 | 0 | Running | 13 |
| 25 | 15 | 77 | Chase Purdy | Spire Motorsports | Chevrolet | 165 | 0 | Running | 12 |
| 26 | 20 | 42 | Matt Mills | Niece Motorsports | Chevrolet | 165 | 0 | Running | 11 |
| 27 | 28 | 76 | Spencer Boyd | Freedom Racing Enterprises | Chevrolet | 162 | 0 | Running | 10 |
| 28 | 32 | 22 | Keith McGee | Reaume Brothers Racing | Ford | 159 | 0 | Running | 9 |
| 29 | 5 | 9 | Grant Enfinger | CR7 Motorsports | Chevrolet | 151 | 0 | Accident | 13 |
| 30 | 26 | 1 | Kris Wright | Tricon Garage | Toyota | 145 | 0 | Accident | 7 |
| 31 | 7 | 38 | Layne Riggs (R) | Front Row Motorsports | Ford | 135 | 0 | Accident | 15 |
| 32 | 23 | 46 | Thad Moffitt (R) | Faction46 | Chevrolet | 1 | 0 | Accident | 5 |
| 33 | 31 | 20 | Memphis Villarreal | Young's Motorsports | Chevrolet | 1 | 0 | Accident | 4 |
| 34 | 33 | 18 | Tyler Ankrum | McAnally-Hilgemann Racing | Chevrolet | 1 | 0 | Accident | 3 |
Official race results

== Standings after the race ==
Drivers' Championship standings

| | Pos | Driver | Points |
|---|---|---|---|
| 3 | 1 | Christian Eckes | 287 |
| | 2 | Corey Heim | 285 (-2) |
| 2 | 3 | Ty Majeski | 275 (–12) |
| 2 | 4 | Nick Sanchez | 260 (–27) |
| | 5 | Taylor Gray | 249 (–38) |
| 3 | 6 | Tyler Ankrum | 244 (–43) |
| | 7 | Rajah Caruth | 233 (–54) |
| | 8 | Matt Crafton | 195 (–92) |
| 2 | 9 | Tanner Gray | 171 (–116) |
| 1 | 10 | Grant Enfinger | 167 (–120) |
Official driver's standings

Manufacturers' Championship standings

| Pos | Manufacturer | Points |
|---|---|---|
| 1 | Chevrolet | 273 |
| 2 | Toyota | 239 (–34) |
| 3 | Ford | 223 (–50) |

- Note: Only the first 10 positions are included for the driver standings.

| Previous race: 2024 Long John Silver's 200 | NASCAR Craftsman Truck Series; 2024 season | Next race: 2024 Heart of America 200 |
