= 2024 Toyota 200 =

12th race of the 2024 NASCAR Craftsman Truck Series

2024 Toyota 200 presented by CK Power
Race details
- Race 12 of 23 of the 2024 NASCAR Craftsman Truck Series
- Date: June 1, 2024
- Official name: 11th Annual Toyota 200 presented by CK Power
- Location: World Wide Technology Raceway in Madison, Illinois
- Course: Permanent racing facility
- Course length: 1.25 miles (2.01 km)
- Distance: 160 laps, 200 mi (321 km)
- Scheduled distance: 160 laps, 200 mi (321 km)
- Average speed: 98.806 mph (159.013 km/h)

Pole position
Driver	Ty Majeski	ThorSport Racing
- Time: 32.475

Most laps led
Driver	Corey Heim	Tricon Garage
- Laps: 65

Winner
No. 11	Corey Heim	Tricon Garage

Television in the United States
- Network: FS2
- Announcers: Jamie Little, Phil Parsons, and Joey Logano

Radio in the United States
- Radio: MRN

The 2024 Toyota 200 presented by CK Power was the 12th stock car race of the 2024 NASCAR Craftsman Truck Series, and the 11th iteration of the event. The race was held on Saturday, June 1, 2024, in Madison, Illinois at World Wide Technology Raceway, a 1.25 miles (2.01 km) permanent asphalt quad-oval shaped speedway. The race took the scheduled 160 laps to complete. Corey Heim, driving for Tricon Garage, continues to show his dominance in the Truck Series, and led the final 65 laps of the race to earn his ninth career NASCAR Craftsman Truck Series win, and his fourth of the season. Heim would also claim the $50,000 bonus prize after winning the second Triple Truck Challenge race. Pole-sitter Ty Majeski won both stages and led 43 laps, but fell back in the final stage to finish 4th. To fill out the podium, Christian Eckes, driving for McAnally-Hilgemann Racing, and Nick Sanchez, driving for Rev Racing, would finish 2nd and 3rd, respectively.

== Report ==
=== Background ===
World Wide Technology Raceway (formerly Gateway International Raceway and Gateway Motorsports Park) is a motorsport racing facility in Madison, Illinois, just east of St. Louis, Missouri, United States, close to the Gateway Arch. It features a 1.25-mile (2 kilometer) oval that hosts the NASCAR Cup Series, NASCAR Craftsman Truck Series, and the NTT IndyCar Series, a 1.6-mile (2.6 km) infield road course used by the SCCA, Porsche Club of America, and various car clubs, and a quarter-mile drag strip that hosts the annual NHRA Midwest Nationals event.

==== Entry list ====
- (R) denotes rookie driver.

#	Driver	Team	Make
1	Colby Howard	Tricon Garage	Toyota
02	Mason Massey	Young's Motorsports	Chevrolet
2	Nick Sanchez	Rev Racing	Chevrolet
5	Dean Thompson	Tricon Garage	Toyota
7	Andrés Pérez de Lara	Spire Motorsports	Chevrolet
9	Grant Enfinger	CR7 Motorsports	Chevrolet
11	Corey Heim	Tricon Garage	Toyota
13	Jake Garcia	ThorSport Racing	Ford
15	Tanner Gray	Tricon Garage	Toyota
17	Taylor Gray	Tricon Garage	Toyota
18	Tyler Ankrum	McAnally-Hilgemann Racing	Chevrolet
19	Christian Eckes	McAnally-Hilgemann Racing	Chevrolet
22	Keith McGee	Reaume Brothers Racing	Ford
25	Ty Dillon	Rackley WAR	Chevrolet
32	Bret Holmes	Bret Holmes Racing	Chevrolet
33	Lawless Alan	Reaume Brothers Racing	Ford
38	Layne Riggs (R)	Front Row Motorsports	Ford
41	Bayley Currey	Niece Motorsports	Chevrolet
42	Matt Mills	Niece Motorsports	Chevrolet
43	Daniel Dye	McAnally-Hilgemann Racing	Chevrolet
45	Connor Mosack	Niece Motorsports	Chevrolet
46	Thad Moffitt (R)	Faction46	Chevrolet
52	Stewart Friesen	Halmar Friesen Racing	Toyota
56	Timmy Hill	Hill Motorsports	Toyota
66	Luke Fenhaus	ThorSport Racing	Ford
71	Rajah Caruth	Spire Motorsports	Chevrolet
76	Spencer Boyd	Freedom Racing Enterprises	Chevrolet
77	Chase Purdy	Spire Motorsports	Chevrolet
88	Matt Crafton	ThorSport Racing	Ford
91	Vicente Salas	McAnally-Hilgemann Racing	Chevrolet
98	Ty Majeski	ThorSport Racing	Ford
99	Ben Rhodes	ThorSport Racing	Ford
Official entry list

== Practice ==
The first and only practice was held on Friday, May 31, at 5:05 PM CST, and would last for 20 minutes. Ty Majeski, driving for ThorSport Racing, would set the fastest time in the session, with a lap of 33.312, and a speed of 135.086 mph (217.400 km/h).

Pos.	#	Driver	Team	Make	Time	Speed
1	98	Ty Majeski	ThorSport Racing	Ford	33.312	135.086
2	19	Christian Eckes	McAnally-Hilgemann Racing	Chevrolet	33.375	134.831
3	38	Layne Riggs (R)	Front Row Motorsports	Ford	33.421	134.646
Full practice results

== Qualifying ==
Qualifying was held on Friday, May 31, at 5:35 PM EST. Since World Wide Technology Raceway is a 1.25 miles (2.01 km) oval, the qualifying system used is a single-car, one-lap system with only one round. Drivers will be on track by themselves and will have one lap to post a qualifying time. Whoever sets the fastest time in that round will win the pole.

Ty Majeski, driving for ThorSport Racing, would score the pole for the race, with a lap of 32.475, and a speed of 138.568 mph (223.004 km/h).

No drivers would fail to qualify.

=== Qualifying results ===
Pos.	#	Driver	Team	Make	Time	Speed
1	98	Ty Majeski	ThorSport Racing	Ford	32.475	138.568
2	19	Christian Eckes	McAnally-Hilgemann Racing	Chevrolet	32.599	138.041
3	2	Nick Sanchez	Rev Racing	Chevrolet	32.610	137.994
4	5	Dean Thompson	Tricon Garage	Toyota	32.618	137.961
5	15	Tanner Gray	Tricon Garage	Toyota	32.730	137.489
6	52	Stewart Friesen	Halmar Friesen Racing	Toyota	32.789	137.241
7	17	Taylor Gray	Tricon Garage	Toyota	32.801	137.191
8	99	Ben Rhodes	ThorSport Racing	Ford	32.864	136.928
9	11	Corey Heim	Tricon Garage	Toyota	32.896	136.795
10	9	Grant Enfinger	CR7 Motorsports	Chevrolet	32.966	136.504
11	77	Chase Purdy	Spire Motorsports	Chevrolet	32.970	136.488
12	18	Tyler Ankrum	McAnally-Hilgemann Racing	Chevrolet	33.027	136.252
13	71	Rajah Caruth	Spire Motorsports	Chevrolet	33.107	135.923
14	43	Daniel Dye	McAnally-Hilgemann Racing	Chevrolet	33.122	135.861
15	13	Jake Garcia	ThorSport Racing	Ford	33.128	135.837
16	7	Andrés Pérez de Lara	Spire Motorsports	Chevrolet	33.200	135.542
17	38	Layne Riggs (R)	Front Row Motorsports	Ford	33.233	135.408
18	45	Connor Mosack	Niece Motorsports	Chevrolet	33.238	135.387
19	88	Matt Crafton	ThorSport Racing	Ford	33.253	135.326
20	91	Vicente Salas	McAnally-Hilgemann Racing	Chevrolet	33.261	135.294
21	02	Mason Massey	Young's Motorsports	Chevrolet	33.385	134.791
22	25	Ty Dillon	Rackley WAR	Chevrolet	33.427	134.622
23	1	Colby Howard	Tricon Garage	Toyota	33.451	134.525
24	33	Lawless Alan	Reaume Brothers Racing	Ford	33.514	134.272
25	41	Bayley Currey	Niece Motorsports	Chevrolet	33.525	134.228
26	42	Matt Mills	Niece Motorsports	Chevrolet	33.612	133.881
27	66	Luke Fenhaus	ThorSport Racing	Ford	33.619	133.853
28	56	Timmy Hill	Hill Motorsports	Toyota	33.954	132.532
29	76	Spencer Boyd	Freedom Racing Enterprises	Chevrolet	34.534	130.306
30	22	Keith McGee	Reaume Brothers Racing	Ford	34.625	129.964
31	46	Thad Moffitt (R)	Faction46	Chevrolet	35.091	128.238
Qualified by owner's points
32	32	Bret Holmes	Bret Holmes Racing	Chevrolet	–	–
Official qualifying results
Official starting lineup

== Race results ==
Stage 1 Laps: 55

Pos.	#	Driver	Team	Make	Pts
1	98	Ty Majeski	ThorSport Racing	Ford	10
2	19	Christian Eckes	McAnally-Hilgemann Racing	Chevrolet	9
3	2	Nick Sanchez	Rev Racing	Chevrolet	8
4	52	Stewart Friesen	Halmar Friesen Racing	Toyota	7
5	11	Corey Heim	Tricon Garage	Toyota	6
6	5	Dean Thompson	Tricon Garage	Toyota	5
7	9	Grant Enfinger	CR7 Motorsports	Chevrolet	4
8	99	Ben Rhodes	ThorSport Racing	Ford	3
9	43	Daniel Dye	McAnally-Hilgemann Racing	Chevrolet	2
10	17	Taylor Gray	Tricon Garage	Toyota	1

Stage 2 Laps: 55

Pos.	#	Driver	Team	Make	Pts
1	98	Ty Majeski	ThorSport Racing	Ford	10
2	19	Christian Eckes	McAnally-Hilgemann Racing	Chevrolet	9
3	2	Nick Sanchez	Rev Racing	Chevrolet	8
4	99	Ben Rhodes	ThorSport Racing	Ford	7
5	11	Corey Heim	Tricon Garage	Toyota	6
6	9	Grant Enfinger	CR7 Motorsports	Chevrolet	5
7	15	Tanner Gray	Tricon Garage	Toyota	4
8	17	Taylor Gray	Tricon Garage	Toyota	3
9	77	Chase Purdy	Spire Motorsports	Chevrolet	2
10	25	Ty Dillon	Rackley WAR	Chevrolet	1

Stage 3 Laps: 50

Pos.	St	#	Driver	Team	Make	Laps	Led	Status	Pts
1	9	11	Corey Heim	Tricon Garage	Toyota	160	65	Running	52
2	2	19	Christian Eckes	McAnally-Hilgemann Racing	Chevrolet	160	2	Running	53
3	3	2	Nick Sanchez	Rev Racing	Chevrolet	160	10	Running	50
4	1	98	Ty Majeski	ThorSport Racing	Ford	160	43	Running	53
5	17	38	Layne Riggs (R)	Front Row Motorsports	Ford	160	0	Running	32
6	11	77	Chase Purdy	Spire Motorsports	Chevrolet	160	5	Running	33
7	8	99	Ben Rhodes	ThorSport Racing	Ford	160	11	Running	40
8	6	52	Stewart Friesen	Halmar Friesen Racing	Toyota	160	0	Running	36
9	16	7	Andrés Pérez de Lara	Spire Motorsports	Chevrolet	160	0	Running	28
10	27	66	Luke Fenhaus	ThorSport Racing	Ford	160	0	Running	27
11	5	15	Tanner Gray	Tricon Garage	Toyota	160	19	Running	30
12	14	43	Daniel Dye	McAnally-Hilgemann Racing	Chevrolet	160	0	Running	27
13	22	25	Ty Dillon	Rackley WAR	Chevrolet	160	0	Running	25
14	4	5	Dean Thompson	Tricon Garage	Toyota	160	0	Running	28
15	12	18	Tyler Ankrum	McAnally-Hilgemann Racing	Chevrolet	160	4	Running	22
16	13	71	Rajah Caruth	Spire Motorsports	Chevrolet	160	0	Running	21
17	10	9	Grant Enfinger	CR7 Motorsports	Chevrolet	160	0	Running	29
18	28	56	Timmy Hill	Hill Motorsports	Toyota	160	0	Running	19
19	24	33	Lawless Alan	Reaume Brothers Racing	Ford	160	0	Running	18
20	19	88	Matt Crafton	ThorSport Racing	Ford	160	0	Running	17
21	32	32	Bret Holmes	Bret Holmes Racing	Chevrolet	159	0	Running	16
22	18	45	Connor Mosack	Niece Motorsports	Chevrolet	159	0	Running	15
23	26	42	Matt Mills	Niece Motorsports	Chevrolet	159	0	Running	14
24	15	13	Jake Garcia	ThorSport Racing	Ford	159	0	Running	13
25	20	91	Vicente Salas	McAnally-Hilgemann Racing	Chevrolet	157	0	Running	12
26	29	76	Spencer Boyd	Freedom Racing Enterprises	Chevrolet	156	0	Running	11
27	30	22	Keith McGee	Reaume Brothers Racing	Ford	156	1	Running	10
28	31	46	Thad Moffitt (R)	Faction46	Chevrolet	155	0	Running	9
29	25	41	Bayley Currey	Niece Motorsports	Chevrolet	153	0	Running	8
30	7	17	Taylor Gray	Tricon Garage	Toyota	152	0	Running	11
31	21	02	Mason Massey	Young's Motorsports	Chevrolet	126	0	Engine	6
32	23	1	Colby Howard	Tricon Garage	Toyota	46	0	Accident	5
Official race results

== Standings after the race ==
Drivers' Championship standings

	Pos	Driver	Points
	1	Christian Eckes	506
	2	Corey Heim	475 (-31)
	3	Nick Sanchez	453 (–53)
	4	Ty Majeski	442 (–64)
	5	Taylor Gray	365 (–141)
	6	Rajah Caruth	357 (–149)
	7	Tyler Ankrum	342 (–164)
2	8	Ben Rhodes	329 (–177)
1	9	Tanner Gray	321 (–185)
1	10	Grant Enfinger	319 (–187)
Official driver's standings

Manufacturers' Championship standings

Pos	Manufacturer	Points
1	Chevrolet	458
2	Toyota	424 (-34)
3	Ford	383 (–75)

- Note: Only the first 10 positions are included for the driver standings.

Previous race: 2024 North Carolina Education Lottery 200	NASCAR Craftsman Truck Series; 2024 season	Next race: 2024 Rackley Roofing 200
