= 2024 Rackley Roofing 200 =

13th race of the 2024 NASCAR Craftsman Truck Series

Race details
- Race 13 of 23 of the 2024 NASCAR Craftsman Truck Series
- Date: June 28, 2024
- Official name: 4th Annual Rackley Roofing 200
- Location: Nashville Superspeedway in Lebanon, Tennessee
- Course: Permanent racing facility
- Course length: 1.333 miles (2.145 km)
- Distance: 150 laps, 199 mi (321 km)
- Scheduled distance: 150 laps, 199 mi (321 km)

Pole position
Driver	Stewart Friesen	Halmar Friesen Racing
- Time: 30.117

Most laps led
Driver	Christian Eckes	McAnally-Hilgemann Racing
- Laps: 150

Winner
No. 19	Christian Eckes	McAnally-Hilgemann Racing

Television in the United States
- Network: FS2
- Announcers: Jamie Little, Larry McReynolds and Phil Parsons

Radio in the United States
- Radio: MRN

The 2024 Rackley Roofing 200 was the 13th stock car race of the 2024 NASCAR Craftsman Truck Series, and the third and final race of the Triple Truck Challenge, the 4th iteration of the event. The race was held on Friday, June 28, 2024, at Nashville Superspeedway in Lebanon, Tennessee, a 1.333 miles (2.145 km) permanent tri-oval shaped racetrack. The race contested the scheduled 150 laps to complete. Christian Eckes, driving for McAnally-Hilgemann Racing, lead all 150 laps of the race to earn his eighth career NASCAR Craftsman Truck Series win, and his third of the season. To fill out the podium, Daniel Dye, driving for McAnally-Hilgemann Racing, and Corey Heim, driving for Tricon Garage, would finish 2nd and 3rd, respectively.

== Report ==
=== Background ===
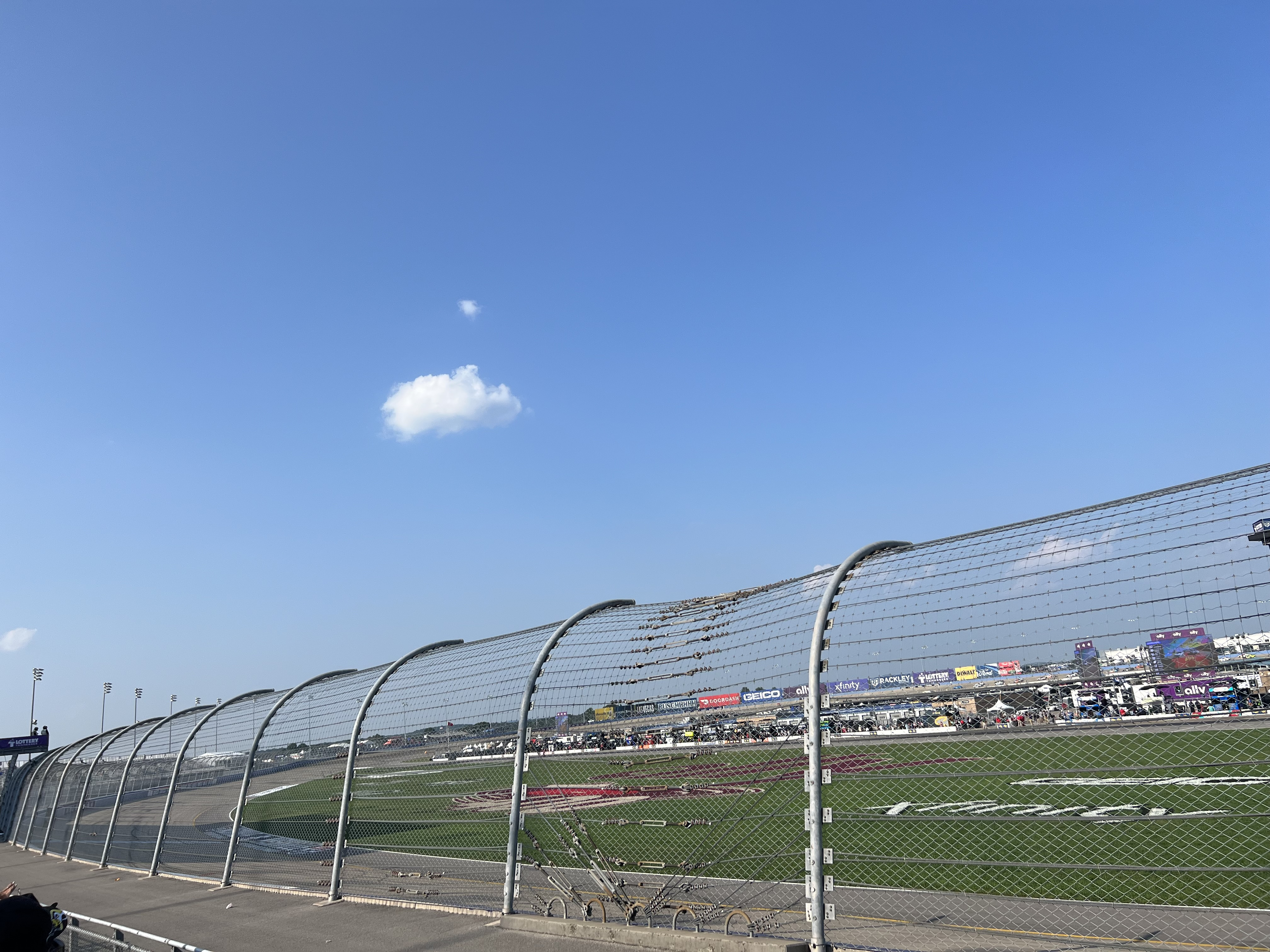
Nashville Superspeedway, the circuit where the race was held.

Nashville Superspeedway is a motor racing complex located in Lebanon, Tennessee, United States, about 30 miles (48 km) southeast of Nashville. The track was built in 2001 and is currently used for events, driving schools and GT Academy, a reality television competition.

It is a concrete oval track 1 1/3 miles (2.146 km) long. Nashville Superspeedway is owned by Dover Motorsports, Inc., which also owns Dover International Speedway. Nashville Superspeedway was the longest concrete oval in NASCAR during the time it was on the NASCAR Xfinity Series and NASCAR Craftsman Truck Series circuits. Current permanent seating capacity is approximately 25,000. Additional portable seats are brought in for some events, and seating capacity can be expanded to 150,000. Infrastructure is in place to expand the facility to include a short track, drag strip, and road course.

==== Entry list ====
- (R) denotes rookie driver.
- (i) denotes driver who is ineligible for series driver points.

#	Driver	Team	Make
1	Brenden Queen	Tricon Garage	Toyota
02	Mason Massey	Young's Motorsports	Chevrolet
2	Nick Sanchez	Rev Racing	Chevrolet
5	Dean Thompson	Tricon Garage	Toyota
7	Clint Bowyer	Spire Motorsports	Chevrolet
9	Grant Enfinger	CR7 Motorsports	Chevrolet
11	Corey Heim	Tricon Garage	Toyota
13	Jake Garcia	ThorSport Racing	Ford
15	Tanner Gray	Tricon Garage	Toyota
17	Taylor Gray	Tricon Garage	Toyota
18	Tyler Ankrum	McAnally-Hilgemann Racing	Chevrolet
19	Christian Eckes	McAnally-Hilgemann Racing	Chevrolet
20	Akinori Ogata	Young's Motorsports	Chevrolet
21	Mason Maggio	Floridian Motorsports	Ford
22	Frankie Muniz	Reaume Brothers Racing	Ford
25	Ty Dillon	Rackley WAR	Chevrolet
26	Dawson Sutton	Rackley WAR	Chevrolet
27	Keith McGee	Reaume Brothers Racing	Ford
28	Bryan Dauzat	FDNY Racing	Chevrolet
32	Bret Holmes	Bret Holmes Racing	Chevrolet
33	Lawless Alan	Reaume Brothers Racing	Ford
38	Layne Riggs (R)	Front Row Motorsports	Ford
41	Bayley Currey	Niece Motorsports	Chevrolet
42	Matt Mills	Niece Motorsports	Chevrolet
43	Daniel Dye	McAnally-Hilgemann Racing	Chevrolet
45	Kaden Honeycutt	Niece Motorsports	Chevrolet
46	Dawson Cram (i)	Faction46	Chevrolet
52	Stewart Friesen	Halmar Friesen Racing	Toyota
56	Timmy Hill	Hill Motorsports	Toyota
66	Conner Jones (R)	ThorSport Racing	Ford
71	Rajah Caruth	Spire Motorsports	Chevrolet
75	Stefan Parsons	Henderson Motorsports	Chevrolet
76	Spencer Boyd	Freedom Racing Enterprises	Chevrolet
77	Chase Purdy	Spire Motorsports	Chevrolet
88	Matt Crafton	ThorSport Racing	Ford
90	Justin Carroll	TC Motorsports	Toyota
91	Jack Wood	McAnally-Hilgemann Racing	Chevrolet
98	Ty Majeski	ThorSport Racing	Ford
99	Ben Rhodes	ThorSport Racing	Ford
Official entry list

== Practice ==
The first and only practice session was held on Friday, June 28, at 3:35 PM CST, and would last for 20 minutes. Rajah Caruth, driving for Spire Motorsports, would set the fastest time in the session, with a lap of 30.517, and a speed of 156.896 mph (252.500 km/h).

Pos.	#	Driver	Team	Make	Time	Speed
1	71	Rajah Caruth	Spire Motorsports	Chevrolet	30.517	156.896
2	19	Christian Eckes	McAnally-Hilgemann Racing	Chevrolet	30.641	156.261
3	11	Corey Heim	Tricon Garage	Toyota	30.774	155.586
Full practice results

== Qualifying ==
Qualifying was held on Friday, June 28, at 4:05 PM CST. Since Nashville Superspeedway is an intermediate speedway, the qualifying system used is a single-car, one-lap based system. All drivers will be on track by themselves and will have one lap to post a qualifying time, and whoever sets the fastest time in that session will win the pole.

Stewart Friesen, driving for Halmar Friesen Racing, would score the pole for the race, with a lap of 30.117, and a speed of 158.980 mph (255.854 km/h).

Three drivers would fail to qualify: Keith McGee, Justin Carroll, and Bryan Dauzat.

=== Qualifying results ===
Pos.	#	Driver	Team	Make	Time	Speed
1	52	Stewart Friesen	Halmar Friesen Racing	Toyota	30.117	158.980
2	9	Grant Enfinger	CR7 Motorsports	Chevrolet	30.140	158.859
3	19	Christian Eckes	McAnally-Hilgemann Racing	Chevrolet	30.152	158.795
4	98	Ty Majeski	ThorSport Racing	Ford	30.184	158.627
5	71	Rajah Caruth	Spire Motorsports	Chevrolet	30.223	158.422
6	38	Layne Riggs (R)	Front Row Motorsports	Ford	30.258	158.239
7	11	Corey Heim	Tricon Garage	Toyota	30.302	158.009
8	45	Kaden Honeycutt	Niece Motorsports	Chevrolet	30.321	157.910
9	43	Daniel Dye	McAnally-Hilgemann Racing	Chevrolet	30.405	157.474
10	77	Chase Purdy	Spire Motorsports	Chevrolet	30.410	157.448
11	7	Clint Bowyer	Spire Motorsports	Chevrolet	30.528	156.840
12	1	Brenden Queen	Tricon Garage	Toyota	30.540	156.778
13	75	Stefan Parsons	Henderson Motorsports	Chevrolet	30.540	156.778
14	18	Tyler Ankrum	McAnally-Hilgemann Racing	Chevrolet	30.552	156.716
15	91	Jack Wood	McAnally-Hilgemann Racing	Chevrolet	30.609	156.425
16	26	Dawson Sutton	Rackley WAR	Chevrolet	30.663	156.149
17	13	Jake Garcia	ThorSport Racing	Ford	30.703	155.946
18	17	Taylor Gray	Tricon Garage	Toyota	30.717	155.875
19	88	Matt Crafton	ThorSport Racing	Ford	30.756	155.677
20	41	Bayley Currey	Niece Motorsports	Chevrolet	30.834	155.283
21	66	Conner Jones (R)	ThorSport Racing	Ford	30.840	155.253
22	33	Lawless Alan	Reaume Brothers Racing	Ford	30.897	154.967
23	76	Spencer Boyd	Freedom Racing Enterprises	Chevrolet	30.946	154.721
24	46	Dawson Cram (i)	Faction46	Chevrolet	31.014	154.382
25	56	Timmy Hill	Hill Motorsports	Toyota	31.015	154.377
26	99	Ben Rhodes	ThorSport Racing	Ford	31.047	154.218
27	02	Mason Massey	Young's Motorsports	Chevrolet	31.216	153.383
28	21	Mason Maggio	Floridian Motorsports	Ford	31.267	153.133
29	5	Dean Thompson	Tricon Garage	Toyota	31.281	153.064
30	32	Bret Holmes	Bret Holmes Racing	Chevrolet	31.291	153.015
31	20	Akinori Ogata	Young's Motorsports	Chevrolet	31.633	151.361
Qualified by owner's points
32	22	Frankie Muniz	Reaume Brothers Racing	Ford	31.757	150.770
33	2	Nick Sanchez	Rev Racing	Chevrolet	–	–
34	15	Tanner Gray	Tricon Garage	Toyota	–	–
35	25	Ty Dillon	Rackley WAR	Chevrolet	–	–
36	42	Matt Mills	Niece Motorsports	Chevrolet	–	–
Failed to qualify
37	27	Keith McGee	Reaume Brothers Racing	Ford	31.866	150.254
38	90	Justin Carroll	TC Motorsports	Toyota	31.925	149.977
39	28	Bryan Dauzat	FDNY Racing	Chevrolet	33.310	143.741
Official qualifying results
Official starting lineup

== Race results ==
Stage 1 Laps: 45

Pos.	#	Driver	Team	Make	Pts
1	19	Christian Eckes	McAnally-Hilgemann Racing	Chevrolet	10
2	38	Layne Riggs (R)	Front Row Motorsports	Ford	9
3	11	Corey Heim	Tricon Garage	Toyota	8
4	9	Grant Enfinger	CR7 Motorsports	Chevrolet	7
5	43	Daniel Dye	McAnally-Hilgemann Racing	Chevrolet	6
6	71	Rajah Caruth	Spire Motorsports	Chevrolet	5
7	52	Stewart Friesen	Halmar Friesen Racing	Toyota	4
8	98	Ty Majeski	ThorSport Racing	Ford	3
9	7	Clint Bowyer	Spire Motorsports	Chevrolet	2
10	18	Tyler Ankrum	McAnally-Hilgemann Racing	Chevrolet	1

Stage 2 Laps: 50

Pos.	#	Driver	Team	Make	Pts
1	19	Christian Eckes	McAnally-Hilgemann Racing	Chevrolet	10
2	11	Corey Heim	Tricon Garage	Toyota	9
3	71	Rajah Caruth	Spire Motorsports	Chevrolet	8
4	43	Daniel Dye	McAnally-Hilgemann Racing	Chevrolet	7
5	9	Grant Enfinger	CR7 Motorsports	Chevrolet	6
6	99	Ben Rhodes	ThorSport Racing	Ford	5
7	52	Stewart Friesen	Halmar Friesen Racing	Toyota	4
8	88	Matt Crafton	ThorSport Racing	Ford	3
9	18	Tyler Ankrum	McAnally-Hilgemann Racing	Chevrolet	2
10	98	Ty Majeski	ThorSport Racing	Ford	1

Stage 3 Laps: 55

Pos.	St.	#	Driver	Team	Make	Laps	Led	Status	Pts
1	3	19	Christian Eckes	McAnally-Hilgemann Racing	Chevrolet	150	150	Running	60
2	9	43	Daniel Dye	McAnally-Hilgemann Racing	Chevrolet	150	0	Running	48
3	7	11	Corey Heim	Tricon Garage	Toyota	150	0	Running	51
4	5	71	Rajah Caruth	Spire Motorsports	Chevrolet	150	0	Running	46
5	14	18	Tyler Ankrum	McAnally-Hilgemann Racing	Chevrolet	150	0	Running	35
6	2	9	Grant Enfinger	CR7 Motorsports	Chevrolet	150	0	Running	44
7	26	99	Ben Rhodes	ThorSport Racing	Ford	150	0	Running	35
8	36	42	Matt Mills	Niece Motorsports	Chevrolet	150	0	Running	29
9	4	98	Ty Majeski	ThorSport Racing	Ford	150	0	Running	32
10	17	13	Jake Garcia	ThorSport Racing	Ford	150	0	Running	27
11	1	52	Stewart Friesen	Halmar Friesen Racing	Toyota	150	0	Running	34
12	21	66	Connor Jones (R)	ThorSport Racing	Ford	150	0	Running	25
13	33	2	Nick Sanchez	Rev Racing	Chevrolet	150	0	Running	24
14	34	15	Tanner Gray	Tricon Garage	Toyota	150	0	Running	23
15	35	25	Ty Dillion	Rackley WAR	Chevrolet	150	0	Running	22
16	15	91	Jack Wood	McAnally-Hilgemann Racing	Chevrolet	150	0	Running	21
17	11	7	Clint Bowyer	Spire Motorsports	Chevrolet	150	0	Running	22
18	16	26	Dawson Sutton	Rackley WAR	Chevrolet	150	0	Running	19
19	12	1	Brenden Queen	Tricon Garage	Chevrolet	150	0	Running	18
20	24	46	Dawson Cram (i)	Fraction46	Chevrolet	150	0	Running	17
21	10	77	Chase Purdy	Spire Motorsports	Chevrolet	149	0	Running	16
22	23	76	Spencer Boyd	Freedom Racing Enterprises	Chevrolet	149	0	Running	15
23	19	88	Matt Crafton	ThorSport Racing	Ford	148	0	Running	17
24	22	23	Lawless Alan	Reaume Brothers Racing	Ford	148	0	Running	13
25	6	38	Layne Riggs (R)	Front Row Motorsports	Ford	148	0	Running	21
26	13	75	Stefan Parsons	Henderson Motorsports	Chevrolet	148	0	Running	11
27	25	56	Timmy Hill	Hill Motorsports	Toyota	147	0	Running	10
28	29	5	Dean Thompson	Tricon Garage	Toyota	146	0	Running	9
29	20	41	Bayley Currey	Niece Motorsports	Chevrolet	146	0	Running	8
30	31	20	Akinori Ogata	Young's Motorsports	Chevrolet	144	0	Running	7
31	32	22	Frankie Muniz	Reaume Brothers Racing	Ford	130	0	Running	6
32	27	02	Mason Massey	Young's Motorsports	Chevrolet	94	0	Brakes	5
33	8	45	Kaden Honeycutt	Niece Motorsports	Chevrolet	84	0	Running	4
34	18	17	Taylor Gray	Tricon Garage	Toyota	53	0	Accident	3
35	28	21	Mason Maggio	Floridian Motorsports	Ford	40	0	Mechanical	2
36	30	32	Bret Holmes	Bret Holmes Racing	Chevrolet	10	0	Mechanical	1

== Standings after the race ==
Drivers' Championship standings

	Pos	Driver	Points
	1	Christian Eckes	566
	2	Corey Heim	526 (–40)
	3	Nick Sanchez	477 (–89)
	4	Ty Majeski	474 (–92)
	5	Rajah Caruth	403 (–163)
	6	Tyler Ankrum	377 (–189)
2	7	Taylor Gray	368 (–198)
	8	Ben Rhodes	364 (–202)
1	9	Grant Enfinger	363 (–203)
1	10	Tanner Gray	344 (–222)
Official driver's standings

Manufacturers' Championship standings

Pos	Manufacturer	Points
1	Chevrolet	498
2	Toyota	458 (–40)
3	Ford	413 (–85)

- Note: Only the first 10 positions are included for the driver standings.

Previous race: 2024 Toyota 200	NASCAR Craftsman Truck Series; 2024 season	Next race: 2024 CRC Brakleen 175
