= Faction46 =

American stock car racing team

- Owner(s): Lane Moore; Logan Moore
- Base: Salisbury, North Carolina
- Series: NASCAR Craftsman Truck Series
- Race drivers: Craftsman Truck Series: 46. Thad Moffitt (R), Dawson Cram
- Manufacturer: Chevrolet
- Opened: 2023
- Closed: 2024

Career
- Races competed: Total: 13; Craftsman Truck Series: 13
- Drivers' Championships: Total: 0 Craftsman Truck Series: 0
- Race victories: Total: 0 Craftsman Truck Series: 0
- Pole positions: Total: 0 Craftsman Truck Series: 0

Faction46 was an American stock car racing team that competed in the NASCAR Craftsman Truck Series. The team was founded in 2023 by Lane and Logan Moore, and fielded the No. 46 Chevrolet Silverado for Thad Moffitt and Dawson Cram for half of the 2024 NASCAR Craftsman Truck Series season before the team was shut down by team owner Lane Moore due to financial constraints in July 2024. The team had a technical alliance with Niece Motorsports and operated out of their race shop in Salisbury, North Carolina.

== History ==
On December 7, 2023, the team announced their intentions of fielding an entry in the NASCAR Craftsman Truck Series in 2024. That same day, co-owner Lane Moore was interviewed by NASCAR YouTuber Eric Estepp, and provided more details about the team's plans for 2024. The team would run Chevrolets in 2024 and operate from the Niece Motorsports shop, whom they would also have a technical alliance with.

=== Truck No. 46 history ===
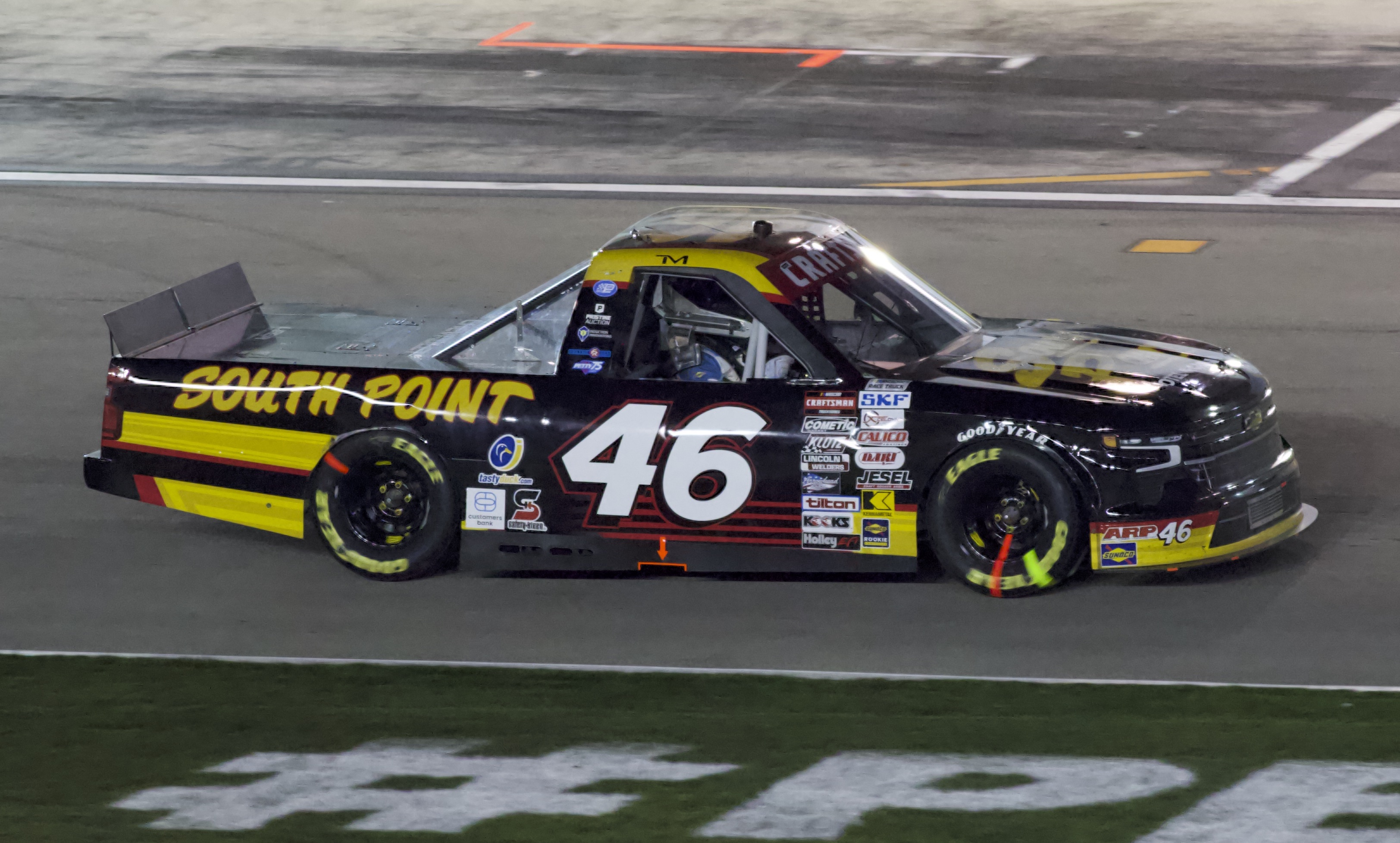
Moffitt's No. 46 truck at Las Vegas Motor Speedway in 2024.

On December 9, 2023, the team announced Thad Moffitt as the driver of the 46 truck for the 2024 season, with Doug George serving as the crew chief. In May 2024, Steve Gassman replaced George as the team's crew chief. Due to a medical emergency, the team substituted Moffitt with Dawson Cram for the race at Nashville when there was a larger number of trucks on the entry list and the team was in danger of failing to qualify for the race if they did not post a fast enough time in qualifying. On July 8, it was announced that Thad Moffitt would go to Young's Motorsports bringing along the No. 46 and its points for the remainder of the 2024 season. Financial constraints, equipment failures, and disagreements between the Moores, Niece Motorsports, and Thad Moffitt led to the Moores pulling out of team ownership.

==== Truck No. 46 results ====
NASCAR Craftsman Truck Series results
Year	Driver	No.	Make	1	2	3	4	5	6	7	8	9	10	11	12	13	14	15	16	17	18	19	20	21	22	23	NCTC	Pts
2024	Thad Moffitt	46	Chevy	DAY; 36	ATL; 26	LVS; 25	BRI; 26	COA; 32	MAR; 27	TEX; 32	KAN; 24	DAR; 18	NWS; 31	CLT; 33	GTW; 28												33rd	174
2024	Dawson Cram	46	Chevy													NSH; 20	POC	IRP	RCH	MLW	BRI	KAN	TAL	HOM	MAR	PHO	33rd	174
