= Carter Fartuch =

American racing driver (born 1995)

- Born: Carter Andrew Fartuch; February 17, 1995 (age 31); Schnecksville, Pennsylvania, U.S.

NASCAR FedEx Freight Truck Series career
- 3 races run over 3 years
- 2025 position: 73rd
- Best finish: 59th (2024)
- First race: 2024 XPEL 225 (COTA)
- Last race: 2026 OnlyBulls Green Flag 150 (St. Petersburg)
| Wins | Top tens | Poles |
|---|---|---|
| 0 | 0 | 0 |
- Statistics up to date as of November 6, 2026.

Carter Andrew Fartuch (born February 16, 1995) is an American professional stock car racing driver. He last competed part-time in the NASCAR Craftsman Truck Series, driving the No. 2 Ford F-150 for Team Reaume. He has previously competed in the Pirelli GT4 America Series and the IMSA Michelin Pilot Challenge. He is the Director of Instructors at the Skip Barber Racing School.

== Racing career ==
Fartuch started racing when he was around twelve or thirteen, driving go-karts at the Lehigh Valley Grand Prix go-kart track in Allentown. After years of racing go-karts, he eventually became an instructor at the Skip Barber Racing School, where he has taught many drivers in the NASCAR Cup Series, such as Jimmie Johnson, Ross Chastain, Bubba Wallace, and Kyle Busch on how to improve their road racing skills.

On March 19, 2024, it was announced that Fartuch would make his NASCAR Craftsman Truck Series debut in the race at Circuit of the Americas. He started 29th and finished 21st.

== Motorsports career results ==
=== NASCAR ===
(key) (Bold – Pole position awarded by qualifying time. Italics – Pole position earned by points standings or practice time. * – Most laps led.)

==== Craftsman Truck Series ====
NASCAR Craftsman Truck Series results
| Year | Team | No. | Make | 1 | 2 | 3 | 4 | 5 | 6 | 7 | 8 | 9 | 10 | 11 | 12 | 13 | 14 | 15 | 16 | 17 | 18 | 19 | 20 | 21 | 22 | 23 | 24 | 25 | NCTC | Pts | Ref |
|---|---|---|---|---|---|---|---|---|---|---|---|---|---|---|---|---|---|---|---|---|---|---|---|---|---|---|---|---|---|---|---|
| 2024 | Reaume Brothers Racing | 22 | Ford | DAY | ATL | LVS | BRI | COA; 21 | MAR | TEX | KAN | DAR | NWS | CLT | GTW | NSH | POC | IRP | RCH | MLW | BRI | KAN | TAL | HOM | MAR | PHO | | | 59th | 16 | |
| 2025 | Reaume Brothers Racing | 2 | Ford | DAY | ATL | LVS | HOM | MAR | BRI | CAR | TEX | KAN | NWS | CLT | NSH | MCH | POC | LRP | IRP | GLN | RCH | DAR | BRI | NHA | ROV; 34 | TAL | MAR | PHO | 74th | 3 | |
| 2026 | Team Reaume | 2 | Ford | DAY | ATL | STP; 21 | DAR | CAR | BRI | TEX | GLN | DOV | CLT | NSH | MCH | COR | LRP | NWS | IRP | RCH | NHA | BRI | KAN | CLT | PHO | TAL | MAR | HOM | 73rd | 16 | |

^{*} Season still in progress
^{1} Ineligible for series points
