= Jerry Bohlman =

American racing driver

- Born: Jerry Edward Bohlman; August 7, 1970 (age 56); East Milton, Florida, U.S.

NASCAR FedEx Freight Truck Series career
- 1 race run over 1 year
- 2024 position: 77th
- Best finish: 77th (2024)
- First race: 2024 Clean Harbors 250 (Richmond)
Wins	Top tens	Poles
0	0	0
- Statistics up to date as of November 8, 2024.

Jerry Edward Bohlman (born August 7, 1970) is an American professional stock car racing driver. He last competed part-time in the NASCAR Craftsman Truck Series, driving the No. 20 Chevrolet Silverado for Young's Motorsports. He also competes in late model racing.

== Racing career ==
Before attempting his first race in the Truck Series, Bohlman raced late models in his home state of Florida at tracks including Five Flags Speedway as well as in vintage car racing alongside his father Gary and brother Gary Jr.

Bohlman announced in a Facebook post in January 2023 that he would be attempting the Bristol Motor Speedway dirt race for the NASCAR Craftsman Truck Series that year in the No. 46 truck for G2G Racing. The team made an official announcement of this in March 2023. Bohlman was one of five trucks that failed to qualify for the race. He would attempt another race later in the year for G2G at Richmond Raceway in the No. 46 truck again. However, after practice, Memphis Villarreal replaced him in the truck. An explanation was not given for why he was replaced. Villarreal would go on to fail to qualify for the race.

Bohlman returned to Richmond in 2024 to attempt to make his Truck Series debut again, this time for Young's Motorsports in their No. 20 truck. Despite spinning in qualifying, he still made the race on owner points. During the race, Bohlman suffered from radio issues. As early as lap two, his spotter had warned him he needed to pick up speed or else he would be parked. After NASCAR messaged him three times beginning on lap twelve, Bohlman was parked on lap 22 and was credited with a last place finish. He became the first driver in the Truck Series to be parked for failing to meet minimum speed since Jesse Iwuji in the spring Kansas race in 2022.

== Personal life ==
Many members of Bohlman's family have also been racing drivers, including his father Gary, brother Gary Jr, and uncle Gib.

Bohlman owns and operates his own business, Bohlman Marine Construction (also one of his sponsors in his Truck Series races), in Milton, Florida. The company was founded in 2018 and builds and repairs docks and boat lifts.

== Motorsports career results ==
=== NASCAR ===
(key) (Bold – Pole position awarded by qualifying time. Italics – Pole position earned by points standings or practice time. * – Most laps led. ** – All laps led.)

==== Craftsman Truck Series ====
NASCAR Craftsman Truck Series results
Year	Team	No.	Make	1	2	3	4	5	6	7	8	9	10	11	12	13	14	15	16	17	18	19	20	21	22	23	NCTC	Pts	Ref
2023	G2G Racing	46	Toyota	DAY	LVS	ATL	COA	TEX	BRD; DNQ	MAR	KAN	DAR	NWS	CLT	GTW	NSH	MOH	POC	RCH; PR^{†}	IRP	MLW	KAN	BRI	TAL	HOM	PHO	N/A	0	
2024	Young's Motorsports	20	Chevy	DAY	ATL	LVS	BRI	COA	MAR	TEX	KAN	DAR	NWS	CLT	GTW	NSH	POC	IRP	RCH; 36	MLW	BRI	KAN	TAL	HOM	MAR	PHO	77th	1	
^{†} – Practiced but replaced by Memphis Villarreal before qualifying

^{*} Season still in progress
^{1} Ineligible for series points
