= Justin Mondeik =

American racing driver

- Born: Justin Robert Mondeik; September 6, 1996 (age 30); Gleason, Wisconsin, U.S.

NASCAR FedEx Freight Truck Series career
- 3 races run over 1 year
- 2024 position: 51st
- Best finish: 51st (2024)
- First race: 2024 UNOH 200 (Bristol)
- Last race: 2024 Baptist Health 200 (Homestead)
Wins	Top tens	Poles
0	0	0
- Statistics up to date as of November 8, 2024.

Justin Robert Mondeik (born September 6, 1996) is an American professional stock car racing driver. He last competed part-time in the NASCAR Craftsman Truck Series, driving the Nos. 02 and 46 Chevrolet Silverados for Young's Motorsports.

== Racing career ==
Mondeik first began his racing career at the age of four, when he raced on ice oval tracks. He later progressed to late models in 2013, where he won various races in Wisconsin, including winning the State Park Speedway track championship in the limited late model division in 2015. He has since competed in series such as the ASA Midwest Tour, where he finished second in the points standings in 2023, the TUNDRA Super Late Model Series, where he won the championship in 2022, and the World Series of Asphalt Stock Car Racing in the super late model division.

On September 7, 2024, it was revealed that Mondeik would make his debut in the NASCAR Craftsman Truck Series at Bristol Motor Speedway, driving the No. 02 Chevrolet for Young's Motorsports. He qualified in 35th and finished two laps down in 28th. He then ran the following race at Kansas Speedway for the team, this time driving the No. 46, where he qualified in 27th and finished three laps down in 26th.

== Motorsports career results ==
=== Stock car career summary ===
Season	Series	Team	Races	Wins	Top 5	Top 10	Points	Position
2023	ASA STARS National Tour	Justin Mondeik Racing	3	0	0	0	121	31st
2024	NASCAR Craftsman Truck Series	Young's Motorsports	3	0	0	0	25	51st
2025	ASA STARS National Tour	Justin Mondeik Racing	2	0	0	2	99	32nd
2026	ASA STARS National Tour	Justin Mondeik Racing	2	0	0	1		

=== NASCAR ===
(key) (Bold – Pole position awarded by qualifying time. Italics – Pole position earned by points standings or practice time. * – Most laps led.)

==== Craftsman Truck Series ====
NASCAR Craftsman Truck Series results
Year	Team	No.	Make	1	2	3	4	5	6	7	8	9	10	11	12	13	14	15	16	17	18	19	20	21	22	23	NCTC	Pts	Ref
2024	Young's Motorsports	02	Chevy	DAY	ATL	LVS	BRI	COA	MAR	TEX	KAN	DAR	NWS	CLT	GTW	NSH	POC	IRP	RCH	MLW	BRI; 28						51st	25	
2024	Young's Motorsports	46	Chevy																			KAN; 26	TAL	HOM; 32	MAR	PHO	51st	25	

^{*} Season still in progress
^{1} Ineligible for series points

=== ASA STARS National Tour ===
(key) (Bold – Pole position awarded by qualifying time. Italics – Pole position earned by points standings or practice time. * – Most laps led. ** – All laps led.)

ASA STARS National Tour results
Year	Team	No.	Make	1	2	3	4	5	6	7	8	9	10	11	12	ASNTC	Pts	Ref
2023	Justin Mondeik Racing	44M	Ford	FIF	MAD; 11	NWS	HCY			WIR; 13	TOL	WIN	NSV			31st	121	
2023	Justin Mondeik Racing	44	Ford					MLW; 23	AND							31st	121	
2025	Justin Mondeik Racing	44	N/A	NSM	FIF	DOM	HCY	NPS	MAD; 7	SLG; 8	AND	OWO	TOL	WIN	NSV	32nd	99	
2026	Justin Mondeik Racing	44	Ford	NSM	FIF	HCY	SLG; 7	MAD; 19	NPS	OWO	TRI	WIN	NSV	NSM		-*	-*	
