= 2024 NASCAR Craftsman Truck Series =

American motorsport season

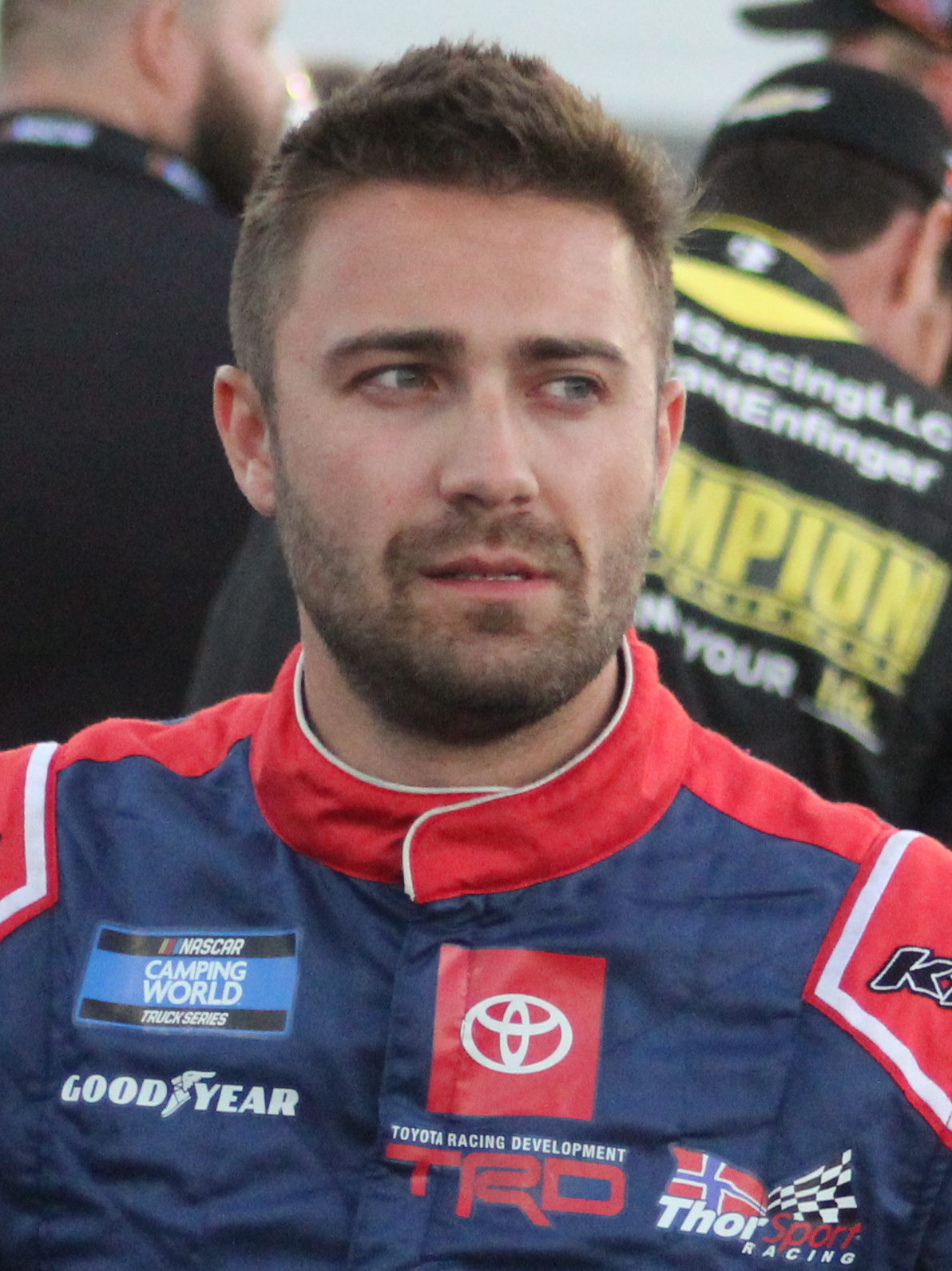
Ty Majeski, the 2024 Craftsman Truck Series champion.

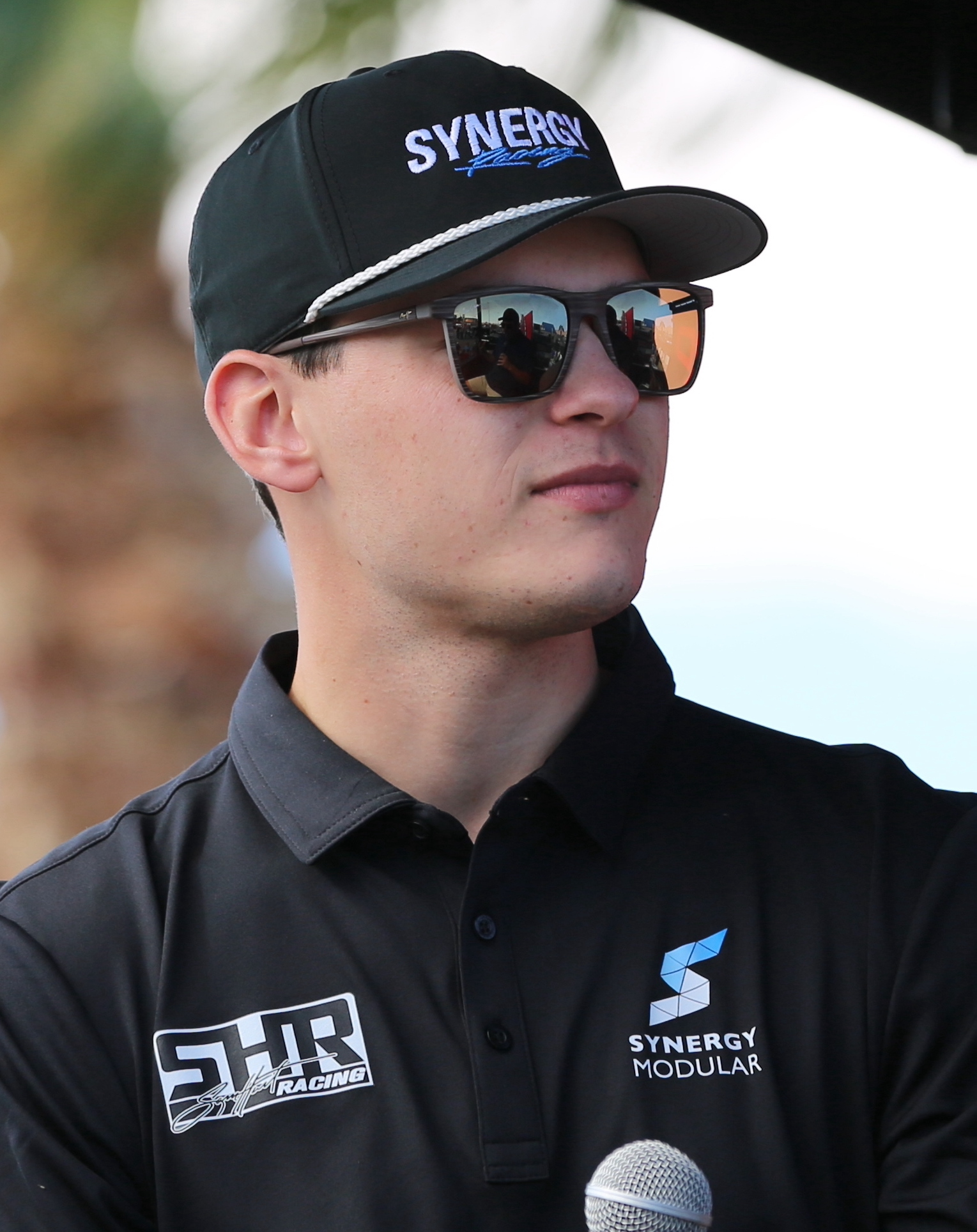
Corey Heim, finished second in the standings behind Majeski.

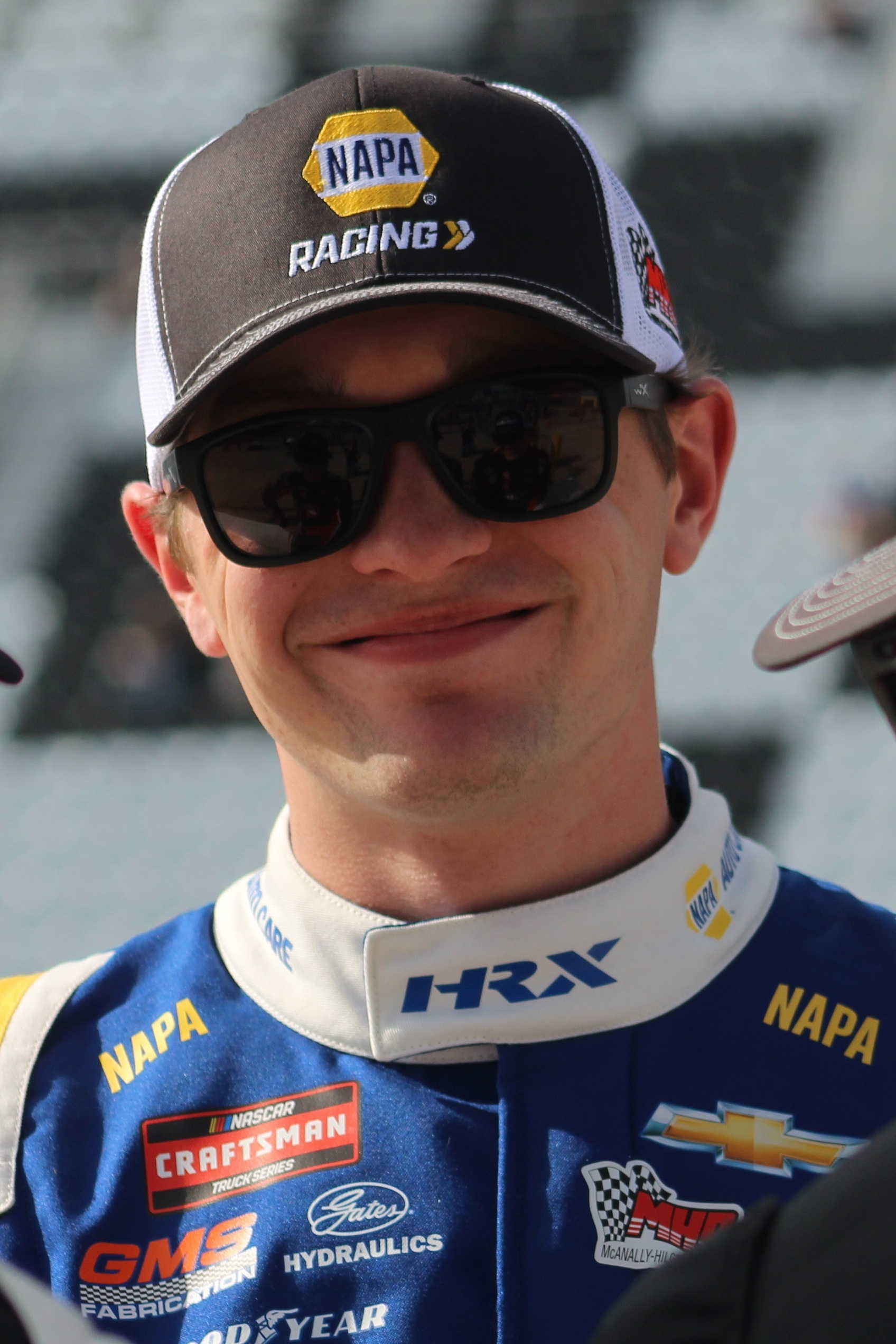
Christian Eckes, the regular season champion, finished third in the standings.

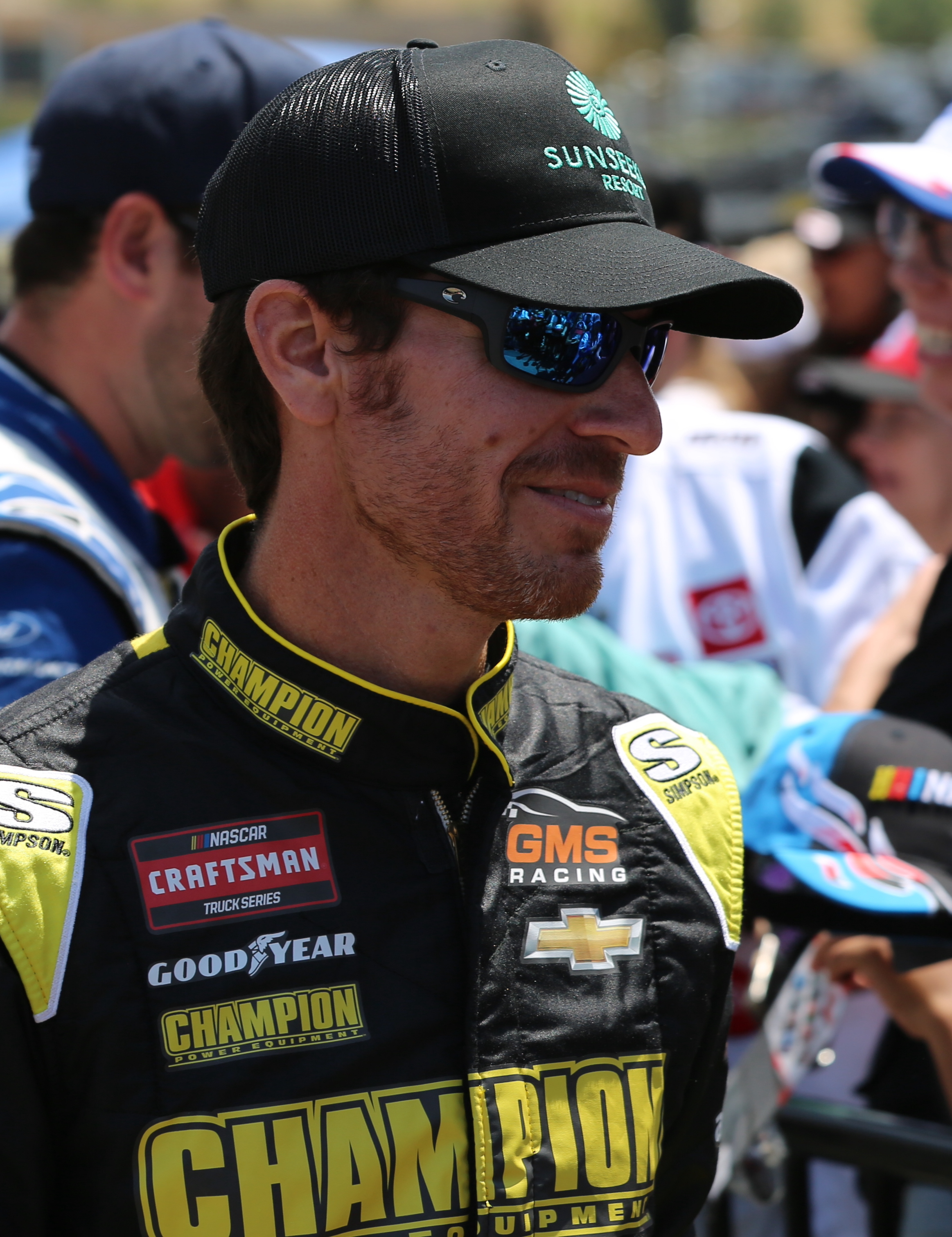
Grant Enfinger, finished fourth in the standings.

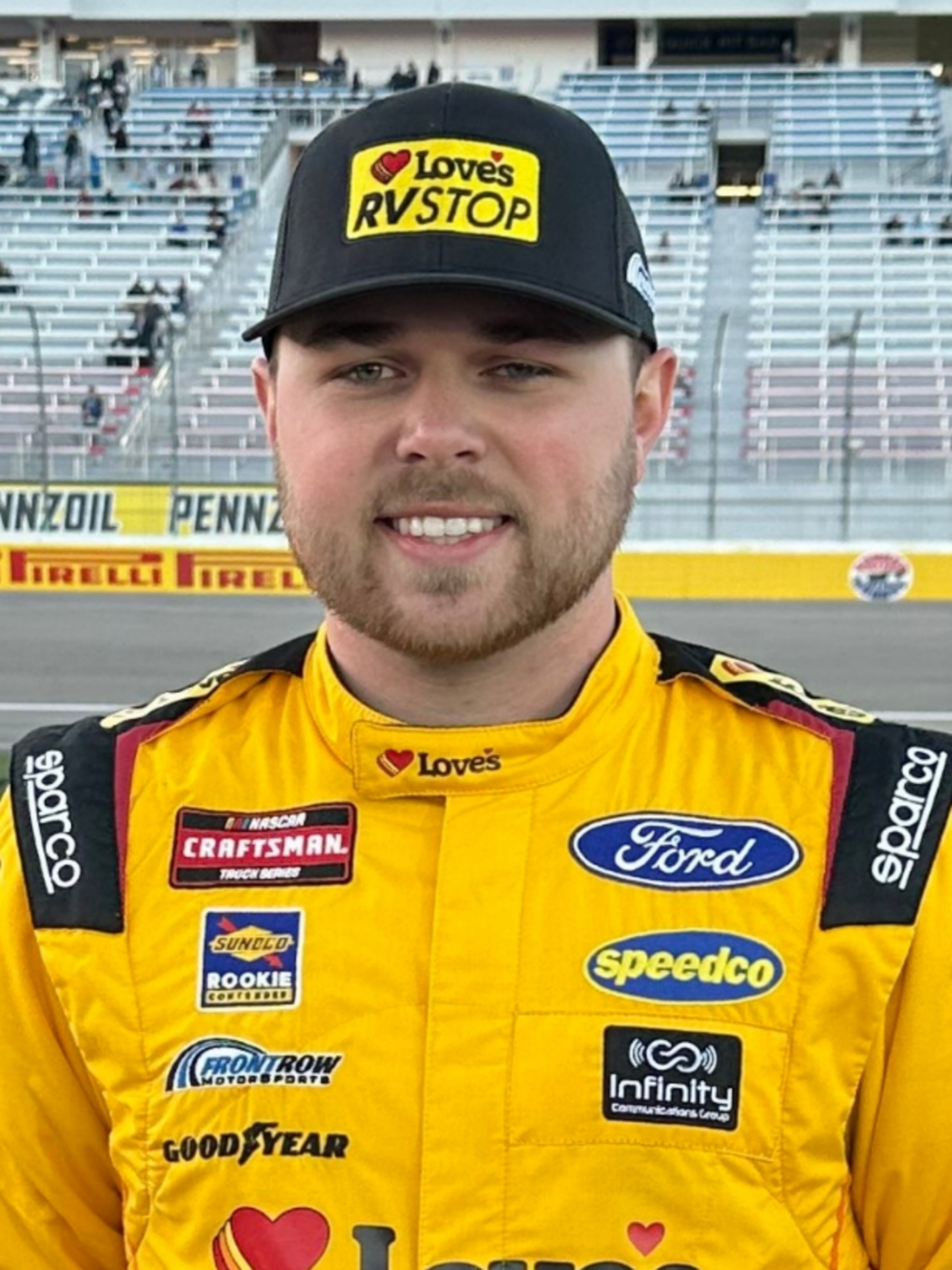
Layne Riggs, the 2024 NASCAR Rookie of the Year.

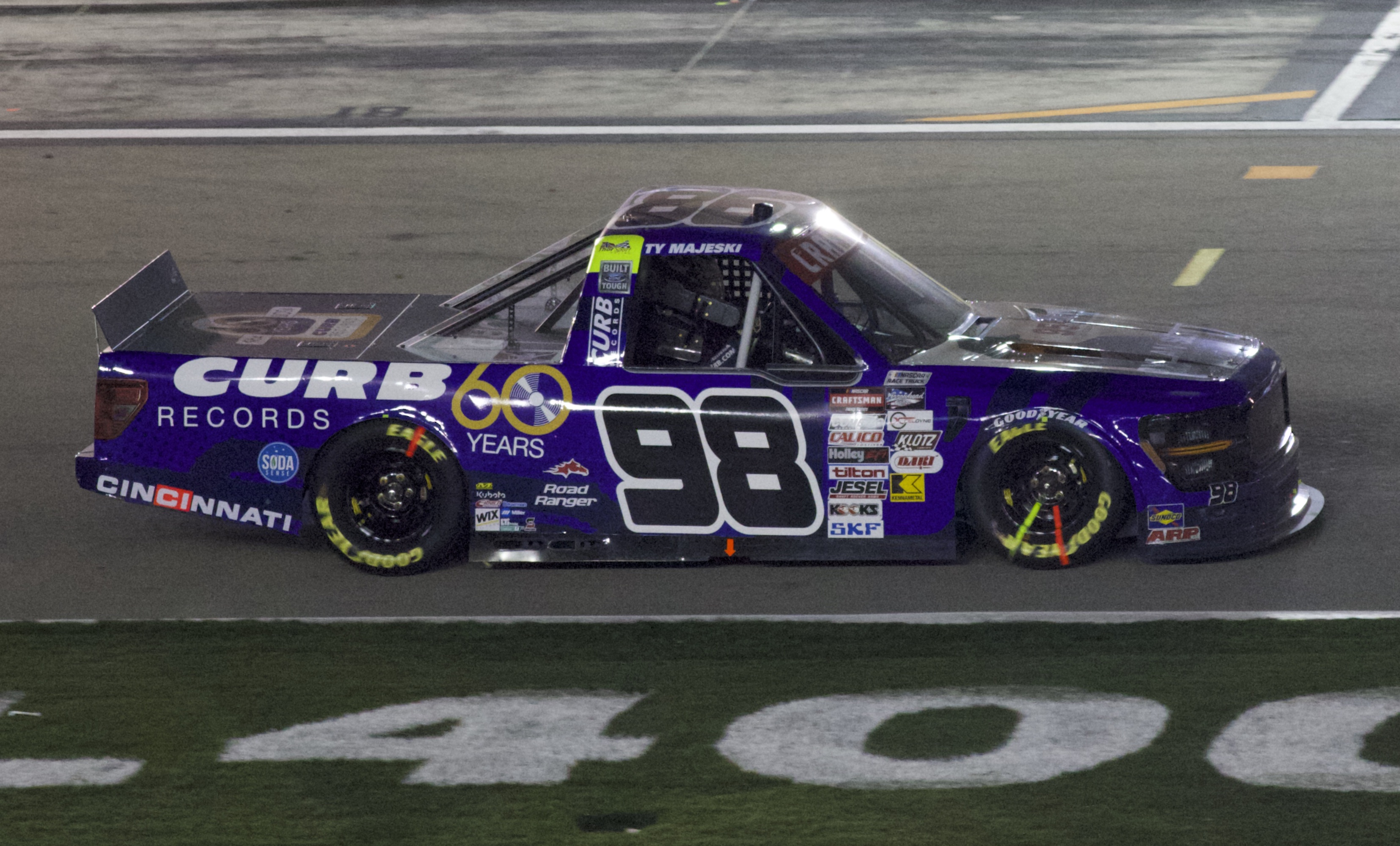
The ThorSport Racing No. 98 truck driven by Ty Majeski won the owners' championship.

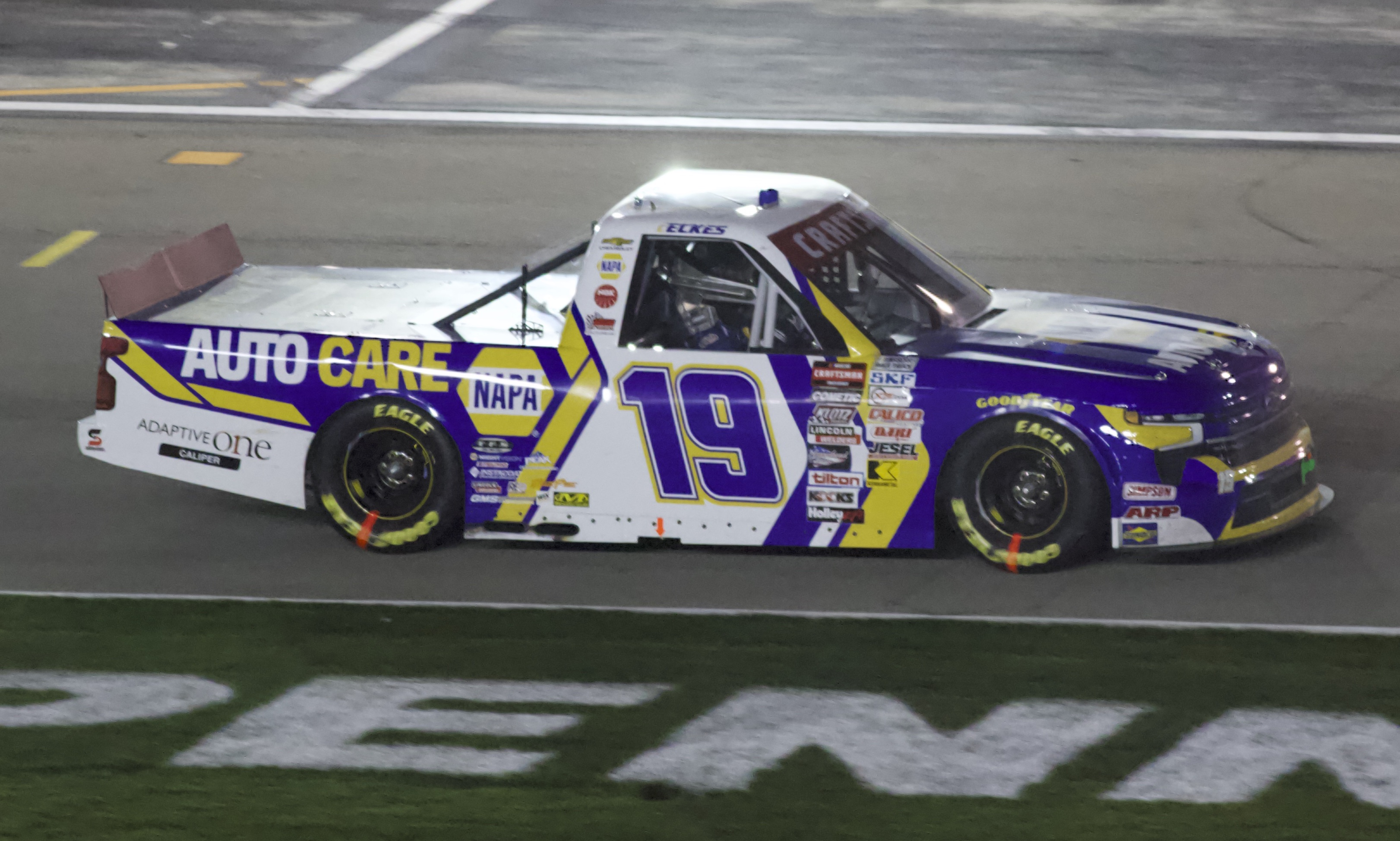
Chevrolet won the manufacturers' championship with 859 points and 12 wins.

The 2024 NASCAR Craftsman Truck Series was the 30th season of the NASCAR Craftsman Truck Series, a pickup truck racing series sanctioned by NASCAR in the United States. The season started on February 16 with the Fresh From Florida 250 at Daytona International Speedway and ended with the NASCAR Craftsman Truck Series Championship Race on November 8 at Phoenix Raceway.

Ben Rhodes of ThorSport Racing entered the season as the defending NASCAR Craftsman Truck Series champion. Christian Eckes claimed the regular season championship. In addition, Layne Riggs of Front Row Motorsports won NASCAR Rookie of the Year honors. Ty Majeski of ThorSport Racing won his first Truck Series championship at season's end.

== Teams and drivers ==
=== Complete schedule ===
Manufacturer	Team	No.	Driver	Crew chief
Chevrolet	CR7 Motorsports	9	Grant Enfinger	Jeff Stankiewicz
Chevrolet	Freedom Racing Enterprises	76	Spencer Boyd	Greg Ely 3 Jeff Hammond 9 Mike Hillman Jr. 11
Chevrolet	McAnally–Hilgemann Racing	18	Tyler Ankrum	Mark Hillman
Chevrolet	McAnally–Hilgemann Racing	19	Christian Eckes	Charles Denike
Chevrolet	McAnally–Hilgemann Racing	43	Daniel Dye	Blake Bainbridge
Chevrolet	McAnally–Hilgemann Racing	91	Jack Wood 13	Kevin Bellicourt 20; Chad Norris 2 Darren Fraley 1
Chevrolet	McAnally–Hilgemann Racing	91	Zane Smith 5	Kevin Bellicourt 20; Chad Norris 2 Darren Fraley 1
Chevrolet	McAnally–Hilgemann Racing	91	Vicente Salas 1	Kevin Bellicourt 20; Chad Norris 2 Darren Fraley 1
Chevrolet	McAnally–Hilgemann Racing	91	Connor Hall 1	Kevin Bellicourt 20; Chad Norris 2 Darren Fraley 1
Chevrolet	McAnally–Hilgemann Racing	91	Corey Day 2	Kevin Bellicourt 20; Chad Norris 2 Darren Fraley 1
Chevrolet	McAnally–Hilgemann Racing	91	Ryan Reed 1	Kevin Bellicourt 20; Chad Norris 2 Darren Fraley 1
Chevrolet	Niece Motorsports	41	Bayley Currey 22 (Note: Currey is running the full season split between the Nos. 41 and 44 Niece Motorsports trucks.)	Mike Hillman Jr. 12; Cody Efaw 4 Wally Rogers 7
Chevrolet	Niece Motorsports	41	Connor Mosack 1	Mike Hillman Jr. 12; Cody Efaw 4 Wally Rogers 7
Chevrolet	Niece Motorsports	42	Matt Mills	Jon Leonard 20; Mike Shiplett 3
Chevrolet	Niece Motorsports	45	Johnny Sauter 2	Phil Gould
Chevrolet	Niece Motorsports	45	Kaden Honeycutt 14	Phil Gould
Chevrolet	Niece Motorsports	45	Connor Mosack 2	Phil Gould
Chevrolet	Niece Motorsports	45	Ross Chastain 5	Phil Gould
Chevrolet	Rackley W.A.R.	25	Ty Dillon 18	Shane Wilson
Chevrolet	Rackley W.A.R.	25	Dawson Sutton 5	Shane Wilson
Chevrolet	Rev Racing	2	Nick Sanchez	Kevin Manion
Chevrolet	Spire Motorsports	7	Corey LaJoie 1	Brian Pattie
Chevrolet	Spire Motorsports	7	Kyle Busch 5	Brian Pattie
Chevrolet	Spire Motorsports	7	Connor Zilisch 5	Brian Pattie
Chevrolet	Spire Motorsports	7	Sammy Smith 4	Brian Pattie
Chevrolet	Spire Motorsports	7	Connor Mosack 6	Brian Pattie
Chevrolet	Spire Motorsports	7	Andrés Pérez de Lara 1	Brian Pattie
Chevrolet	Spire Motorsports	7	Clint Bowyer 1	Brian Pattie
Chevrolet	Spire Motorsports	71	Rajah Caruth	Chad Walter
Chevrolet	Spire Motorsports	77	Chase Purdy	Jason Trinchere
Ford	Front Row Motorsports	38	Layne Riggs (R)	Dylan Cappello 22; Mike Contarino 1 (Note: Dylan Cappello was originally on the entry list for Gateway, but had to miss the race due to personal reasons.)
Ford	Reaume Brothers Racing	22	Jason White 2	Ryan London 2 John Reaume 9 Pedro Lopez 11; Greg Ely 1
Ford	Reaume Brothers Racing	22	Keith McGee 9	Ryan London 2 John Reaume 9 Pedro Lopez 11; Greg Ely 1
Ford	Reaume Brothers Racing	22	Carter Fartuch 1	Ryan London 2 John Reaume 9 Pedro Lopez 11; Greg Ely 1
Ford	Reaume Brothers Racing	22	Stephen Mallozzi 1	Ryan London 2 John Reaume 9 Pedro Lopez 11; Greg Ely 1
Ford	Reaume Brothers Racing	22	Mason Maggio 4	Ryan London 2 John Reaume 9 Pedro Lopez 11; Greg Ely 1
Ford	Reaume Brothers Racing	22	Josh Reaume 1	Ryan London 2 John Reaume 9 Pedro Lopez 11; Greg Ely 1
Ford	Reaume Brothers Racing	22	Frankie Muniz 3	Ryan London 2 John Reaume 9 Pedro Lopez 11; Greg Ely 1
Ford	Reaume Brothers Racing	22	Tyler Tomassi 1	Ryan London 2 John Reaume 9 Pedro Lopez 11; Greg Ely 1
Ford	Reaume Brothers Racing	22	Clayton Green 1	Ryan London 2 John Reaume 9 Pedro Lopez 11; Greg Ely 1
Ford	Reaume Brothers Racing	33	Lawless Alan	Matthew Lucas 2 Josh Reaume 1 Greg Ely 6 Doug George 14
Ford	ThorSport Racing	13	Jake Garcia	Doug Randolph 8 Rich Lushes 15
Ford	ThorSport Racing	88	Matt Crafton	Jeriod Prince
Ford	ThorSport Racing	98	Ty Majeski	Joe Shear Jr.
Ford	ThorSport Racing	99	Ben Rhodes	Rich Lushes 8 Doug Randolph 15
Toyota	Halmar Friesen Racing	52	Stewart Friesen	Jimmy Villeneuve
Toyota	Hill Motorsports	56	Timmy Hill	Terry Elmore
Toyota	Tricon Garage	1	Toni Breidinger 1	Seth Smith 20; Jerame Donley 3
Toyota	Tricon Garage	1	Colby Howard 3	Seth Smith 20; Jerame Donley 3
Toyota	Tricon Garage	1	Christopher Bell 1	Seth Smith 20; Jerame Donley 3
Toyota	Tricon Garage	1	William Sawalich 10	Seth Smith 20; Jerame Donley 3
Toyota	Tricon Garage	1	Jack Hawksworth 1	Seth Smith 20; Jerame Donley 3
Toyota	Tricon Garage	1	Kris Wright 2	Seth Smith 20; Jerame Donley 3
Toyota	Tricon Garage	1	Brett Moffitt 2	Seth Smith 20; Jerame Donley 3
Toyota	Tricon Garage	1	Brenden Queen 3	Seth Smith 20; Jerame Donley 3
Toyota	Tricon Garage	5	Dean Thompson	Derek Smith
Toyota	Tricon Garage	11	Corey Heim	Scott Zipadelli
Toyota	Tricon Garage	15	Tanner Gray	Jerame Donley 16; Jason Burdett 7
Toyota	Tricon Garage	17	Taylor Gray	Jeff Hensley
Chevrolet 22 Ford 1	Young's Motorsports 22; Reaume Brothers Racing 1	02	Mason Massey 16	Joe Lax 1 Trip Bruce 18; Andrew Abbott 4
Chevrolet 22 Ford 1	Young's Motorsports 22; Reaume Brothers Racing 1	02	Dexter Bean 1	Joe Lax 1 Trip Bruce 18; Andrew Abbott 4
Chevrolet 22 Ford 1	Young's Motorsports 22; Reaume Brothers Racing 1	02	Justin Mondeik 1	Joe Lax 1 Trip Bruce 18; Andrew Abbott 4
Chevrolet 22 Ford 1	Young's Motorsports 22; Reaume Brothers Racing 1	02	Nathan Byrd 3	Joe Lax 1 Trip Bruce 18; Andrew Abbott 4
Chevrolet 22 Ford 1	Young's Motorsports 22; Reaume Brothers Racing 1	02	Keith McGee 1	Joe Lax 1 Trip Bruce 18; Andrew Abbott 4
Chevrolet 22 Ford 1	Young's Motorsports 22; Reaume Brothers Racing 1	02	Dylan Lupton 1	Joe Lax 1 Trip Bruce 18; Andrew Abbott 4

=== Limited schedule ===
Manufacturer	Team	No.	Driver	Crew chief	Races
Chevrolet	Bret Holmes Racing	32	Bret Holmes	Mike Shiplett	20
Chevrolet	CR7 Motorsports	97	Codie Rohrbaugh	Michael Shelton	1
Chevrolet	Faction46 13; Young's Motorsports 8	46	Thad Moffitt (R)	Doug George 7 Steve Gassman 6 Tyler Young 8	17
Chevrolet	Faction46 13; Young's Motorsports 8	46	Dawson Cram	Doug George 7 Steve Gassman 6 Tyler Young 8	1
Chevrolet	Faction46 13; Young's Motorsports 8	46	Tyler Tomassi	Doug George 7 Steve Gassman 6 Tyler Young 8	1
Chevrolet	Faction46 13; Young's Motorsports 8	46	Justin Mondeik	Doug George 7 Steve Gassman 6 Tyler Young 8	2
Chevrolet	FDNY Racing	28	Bryan Dauzat (Note: After McGee failed to qualify for the race at Talladega (race 20) in the Young's Motorsports/Reaume Brothers Racing No. 02 Ford, he replaced Bryan Dauzat in the FDNY Racing No. 28 in the race.)	Jim Rosenblum	4
Chevrolet	FDNY Racing	28	Keith McGee	Jim Rosenblum	1
Chevrolet	GK Racing	95	Clay Greenfield	Tucker Wingo 1 Trip Bruce III 1	2
Chevrolet	Henderson Motorsports	75	Stefan Parsons	Chris Carrier	10
Chevrolet	Henderson Motorsports	75	Connor Zilisch (Note: Zilisch's entry will be prepared by Spire Motorsports.)	Chris Carrier	1
Chevrolet	Hettinger Racing	4	Brett Moffitt	AJ Heister	2
Chevrolet	Jennifer Jo Cobb Racing	10	Jennifer Jo Cobb	Clayton Hughes 1 Doug George 1 Bambi Wade 2	4
Chevrolet	McAnally–Hilgemann Racing	81	Corey Day	Chad Norris	2
Chevrolet	Niece Motorsports	44	Conor Daly	Wally Rogers 2 Tom Ackerman 4 Jon Leonard 2	3
Chevrolet	Niece Motorsports	44	Matt Gould	Wally Rogers 2 Tom Ackerman 4 Jon Leonard 2	2
Chevrolet	Niece Motorsports	44	Bayley Currey	Wally Rogers 2 Tom Ackerman 4 Jon Leonard 2	1
Chevrolet	Niece Motorsports	44	Danny Bohn	Wally Rogers 2 Tom Ackerman 4 Jon Leonard 2	1
Chevrolet	Niece Motorsports	44	Stefan Parsons	Wally Rogers 2 Tom Ackerman 4 Jon Leonard 2	1
Chevrolet	Norm Benning Racing (Note: Entry at Talladega (race 20) will be fielded in a collaboration with Henderson Motorsports.)	6	Norm Benning	Dan Killius	3
Chevrolet	Rackley W.A.R.	26	Dawson Sutton	Willie Allen	2
Chevrolet	Roper Racing (Note: Entry is fielded in a collaboration with Cook Racing Technologies.)	04	Cory Roper	Craig Roper 1 Bruce Cook 9	2
Chevrolet	Roper Racing	04	Marco Andretti	Craig Roper 1 Bruce Cook 9	6
Chevrolet	Roper Racing	04	Clayton Green	Craig Roper 1 Bruce Cook 9	1
Chevrolet	Roper Racing	04	Andrés Pérez de Lara	Craig Roper 1 Bruce Cook 9	1
Chevrolet	Trey Hutchens Racing	14	Trey Hutchens	Bobby Hutchens	3
Chevrolet	Young's Motorsports	20	Vicente Salas	Tyler Young 4 Andrew Abbott 1 DJ Powell Jr. 1	1
Chevrolet	Young's Motorsports	20	Blake Lothian	Tyler Young 4 Andrew Abbott 1 DJ Powell Jr. 1	1
Chevrolet	Young's Motorsports	20	Memphis Villarreal	Tyler Young 4 Andrew Abbott 1 DJ Powell Jr. 1	2
Chevrolet	Young's Motorsports	20	Akinori Ogata	Tyler Young 4 Andrew Abbott 1 DJ Powell Jr. 1	1
Chevrolet	Young's Motorsports	20	Jerry Bohlman	Tyler Young 4 Andrew Abbott 1 DJ Powell Jr. 1	1
Ford	Reaume Brothers Racing	27	Keith McGee	John Reaume 2 Pedro Lopez 1 Josh Reaume 1	2
Ford	Reaume Brothers Racing	27	Stephen Mallozzi	John Reaume 2 Pedro Lopez 1 Josh Reaume 1	1
Ford	Reaume Brothers Racing	27	Frankie Muniz	John Reaume 2 Pedro Lopez 1 Josh Reaume 1	1
Ford	ThorSport Racing	66	Conner Jones (R)	Josh Hankish	13
Ford	ThorSport Racing	66	Cameron Waters	Josh Hankish	2
Ford	ThorSport Racing	66	Luke Fenhaus	Josh Hankish	3
Ford	ThorSport Racing	66	Johnny Sauter	Josh Hankish	1
Toyota	Hattori Racing Enterprises	16	Aric Almirola	Richie Wauters 3 Jamie Jones 1	1
Toyota	Hattori Racing Enterprises	16	Johnny Sauter	Richie Wauters 3 Jamie Jones 1	2
Toyota	Hattori Racing Enterprises	16	Landen Lewis	Richie Wauters 3 Jamie Jones 1	1
Toyota	MBM Motorsports	67	Jeffrey Earnhardt	Carl Long	1
Toyota	Ryan Huff Motorsports	36	Ryan Huff	Tim Silva	1
Toyota	TC Motorsports	90	Justin Carroll	Terry Carroll	9
Toyota	Young's Motorsports	12	Dale Quarterley (Note: Entry was fielded in a collaboration with 1/4 Ley Racing.)	Andrew Abbott	1
Toyota 2 Ford 8	Floridian Motorsports	21	Mason Maggio	Tim Horton 3 Carl Long 7	8
Toyota 2 Ford 8	Floridian Motorsports	21	Sage Karam	Tim Horton 3 Carl Long 7	1
Toyota 2 Ford 8	Floridian Motorsports	21	Jayson Alexander	Tim Horton 3 Carl Long 7	1

== Other confirmed changes ==
=== Teams ===
- On August 23, 2023, GMS Racing announced that they would close down after the 2023 season. Team owner Maury Gallagher will focus his efforts on the Cup Series team that he co-owns with Jimmie Johnson, Legacy Motor Club, starting in 2024. GMS fielded three full-time trucks in 2023: the No. 23 driven by Grant Enfinger, the No. 24 driven by Rajah Caruth, and the No. 43 driven by Daniel Dye.
- In July 2024, Young's Motorsports acquired the No. 46 from Faction46, which had only run the first 13 races of the season.
- In October 2024, Bret Holmes Racing shut down its operations, with Late Model team owner Chris Hettinger purchasing the team's assets and renaming it Hettinger Racing.

=== Drivers ===
- Matt DiBenedetto would not return to the Rackley W.A.R. No. 25 in 2024, after being with the team full-time in 2022 and 2023. After he was eliminated from the 2023 playoffs and had already announced his plans not to return to the team in 2024, Rackley W.A.R. removed DiBenedetto from the No. 25 early.
- Hailie Deegan would move to the Xfinity Series full-time in 2024 driving for AM Racing.
- Colby Howard would not return to the CR7 Motorsports No. 9 truck in 2024.

=== Crew chiefs ===
- On November 4, 2023, Wally Rogers announced his retirement from crew chiefing in NASCAR after working for numerous teams in the Cup, Xfinity, and Truck Series for over 20 years. He worked for Niece Motorsports since partway through the 2020 season and crew chiefed their No. 45 truck driven by Lawless Alan in 2023. His replacement has yet to be announced.
- On December 29, 2023, Rackley W.A.R. announced that crew chief Chad Kendrick would not return to the team in 2024, with Ty Dillon, who will drive for the team in 2024, indicating that Kendrick is looking to step up into the Xfinity Series.

=== Interim crew chiefs ===
- On April 16, 2024, Chris Carrier, crew chief of the Henderson Motorsports No. 75 truck driven by Stefan Parsons, was suspended for the Heart of America 200 at Kansas Speedway and fined US$5,000 when post-race inspection after the 2024 SpeedyCash.com 250 at Texas Motor Speedway revealed improperly installed lug nuts.

== Schedule ==
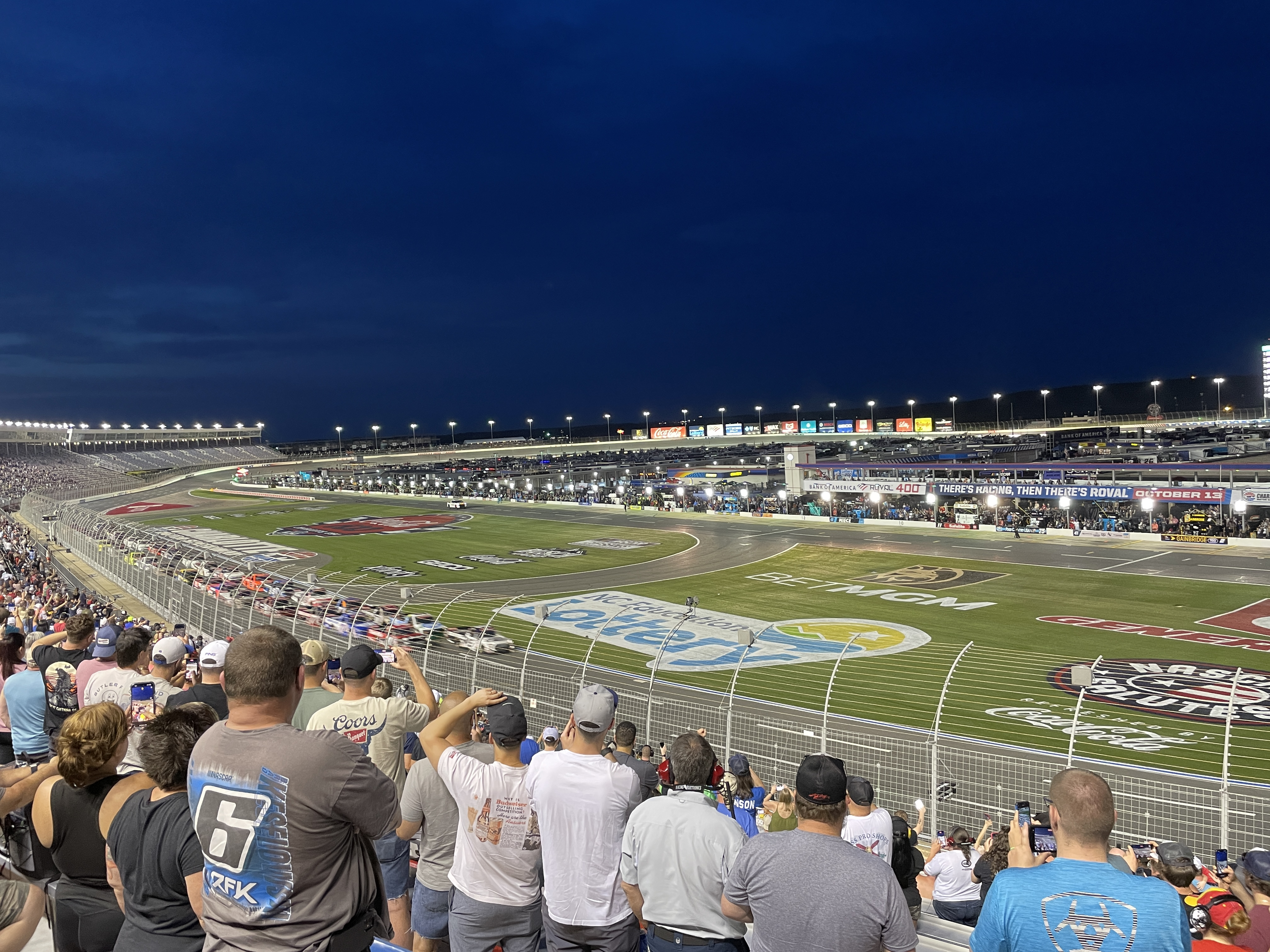
The North Carolina Education Lottery 200 at Charlotte Motor Speedway in May.

The entire schedule was released on October 4, 2023, consisting of 22 ovals and 1 road course; no dirt tracks would appear on the schedule for the first time since 2020.

- The Triple Truck Challenge races are listed in **bold**.
O Oval track
R Road course

No	Race title	Track	Location	Date	TV	Radio
1	Fresh From Florida 250	O Daytona International Speedway	Daytona Beach, Florida	February 16	FS1	MRN
2	Fr8 208	O Atlanta Motor Speedway	Hampton, Georgia	February 24	FS1	MRN
3	Victoria's Voice Foundation 200	O Las Vegas Motor Speedway	Las Vegas, Nevada	March 1	FS1	MRN
4	Weather Guard Truck Race	O Bristol Motor Speedway	Bristol, Tennessee	March 16	FS1	MRN
5	XPEL 225	R Circuit of the Americas	Austin, Texas	March 23	FS1	MRN
6	Long John Silver's 200	O Martinsville Speedway	Ridgeway, Virginia	April 5	FS1	MRN
7	SpeedyCash.com 250	O Texas Motor Speedway	Fort Worth, Texas	April 12	FS1	MRN
8	Heart of America 200	O Kansas Speedway	Kansas City, Kansas	May 4	FS1	MRN
9	Buckle Up South Carolina 200	O Darlington Raceway	Darlington, South Carolina	May 10	FS1	MRN
10	Wright Brand 250	O North Wilkesboro Speedway	North Wilkesboro, North Carolina	May 18	FS1	MRN
11	**North Carolina Education Lottery 200**	O Charlotte Motor Speedway	Concord, North Carolina	May 24	FS1	MRN
12	**Toyota 200**	O World Wide Technology Raceway	Madison, Illinois	June 1	Fox	MRN
13	**Rackley Roofing 200**	O Nashville Superspeedway	Lebanon, Tennessee	June 28	FS2	MRN
14	CRC Brakleen 175	O Pocono Raceway	Long Pond, Pennsylvania	July 12	FS1	MRN
15	TSport 200	O Lucas Oil Indianapolis Raceway Park	Brownsburg, Indiana	July 19	FS2	MRN
16	Clean Harbors 250	O Richmond Raceway	Richmond, Virginia	August 10	FS1	MRN
NASCAR Craftsman Truck Series Playoffs
Round of 10
17	LiUNA! 175	O Milwaukee Mile	West Allis, Wisconsin	August 25	FS1	MRN
18	UNOH 200 presented by Ohio Logistics	O Bristol Motor Speedway	Bristol, Tennessee	September 19	FS1	MRN
19	Kubota Tractor 200	O Kansas Speedway	Kansas City, Kansas	September 27	FS1	MRN
Round of 8
20	Love's RV Stop 225	O Talladega Superspeedway	Lincoln, Alabama	October 4	FS1	MRN
21	Baptist Health 200	O Homestead–Miami Speedway	Homestead, Florida	October 26	FS1	MRN
22	Zip Buy Now, Pay Later 200	O Martinsville Speedway	Martinsville, Virginia	November 1	FS1	MRN
Championship 4
23	NASCAR Craftsman Truck Series Championship Race	O Phoenix Raceway	Avondale, Arizona	November 8	FS1	MRN

== Results and standings ==
=== Race results ===
No.	Race	Pole position	Most laps led	Winning driver	Manufacturer	No.	Winning team	Report
1	Fresh From Florida 250	Ty Majeski	Nick Sanchez	Nick Sanchez	Chevrolet	2	Rev Racing	Report
2	Fr8 208	Daniel Dye	Tyler Ankrum	Kyle Busch	Chevrolet	7	Spire Motorsports	Report
3	Victoria's Voice Foundation 200	Rajah Caruth	Ty Majeski	Rajah Caruth	Chevrolet	71	Spire Motorsports	Report
4	Weather Guard Truck Race	Christian Eckes	Christian Eckes	Christian Eckes	Chevrolet	19	McAnally–Hilgemann Racing	Report
5	XPEL 225	Connor Zilisch	Corey Heim	Corey Heim	Toyota	11	Tricon Garage	Report
6	Long John Silver's 200	Ty Majeski	Christian Eckes	Christian Eckes	Chevrolet	19	McAnally–Hilgemann Racing	Report
7	SpeedyCash.com 250	Nick Sanchez	Kyle Busch	Kyle Busch	Chevrolet	7	Spire Motorsports	Report
8	Heart of America 200	Chase Purdy	Corey Heim	Corey Heim	Toyota	11	Tricon Garage	Report
9	Buckle Up South Carolina 200	Nick Sanchez	Corey Heim	Ross Chastain	Chevrolet	45	Niece Motorsports	Report
10	Wright Brand 250	Christian Eckes	Corey Heim	Corey Heim	Toyota	11	Tricon Garage	Report
11	North Carolina Education Lottery 200	Tanner Gray	Corey Heim	Nick Sanchez	Chevrolet	2	Rev Racing	Report
12	Toyota 200	Ty Majeski	Corey Heim	Corey Heim	Toyota	11	Tricon Garage	Report
13	Rackley Roofing 200	Stewart Friesen	Christian Eckes	Christian Eckes	Chevrolet	19	McAnally–Hilgemann Racing	Report
14	CRC Brakleen 175	Christian Eckes	Corey Heim	Corey Heim	Toyota	11	Tricon Garage	Report
15	TSport 200	Rajah Caruth	Christian Eckes	Ty Majeski	Ford	98	ThorSport Racing	Report
16	Clean Harbors 250	Christian Eckes	Grant Enfinger	Ty Majeski	Ford	98	ThorSport Racing	Report
NASCAR Craftsman Truck Series Playoffs
Round of 10
17	LiUNA! 175	Ty Majeski	Christian Eckes	Layne Riggs	Ford	38	Front Row Motorsports	Report
18	UNOH 200	Connor Zilisch	Layne Riggs	Layne Riggs	Ford	38	Front Row Motorsports	Report
19	Kubota Tractor 200	Ty Majeski	Corey Heim	Corey Heim	Toyota	11	Tricon Garage	Report
Round of 8
20	Love's RV Stop 225	William Sawalich	Grant Enfinger	Grant Enfinger	Chevrolet	9	CR7 Motorsports	Report
21	Baptist Health 200	Corey Heim	Corey Heim	Grant Enfinger	Chevrolet	9	CR7 Motorsports	Report
22	Zip Buy Now, Pay Later 200	Christian Eckes	Christian Eckes	Christian Eckes	Chevrolet	19	McAnally–Hilgemann Racing	Report
Championship 4
23	NASCAR Craftsman Truck Series Championship Race	Ty Majeski	Ty Majeski	Ty Majeski	Ford	98	ThorSport Racing	Report

=== Drivers' championship ===
(key) Bold – Pole position awarded by time. Italics – Pole position set by competition-based formula. * – Most laps led. ^{1} – Stage 1 winner. ^{2} – Stage 2 winner. ^{1-10} – Regular season top 10 finishers.
. – Eliminated after Round of 10 . – Eliminated after Round of 8

Pos.	Driver	DAY	ATL	LVS	BRI	COA	MAR	TEX	KAN	DAR	NWS	CLT	GTW	NSH	POC	IRP	RCH	MIL	BRI	KAN	TAL	HOM	MAR	PHO	Pts.	Stage	Bonus
1	Ty Majeski	**15**	2	10*^{12}	34	3	**2**	10	33	5	11^{1}	23	**4**^{12}	9	31	1	1	**2**	8	**15**^{1}	12	2	11	**1***^{2}	4040	–	24^{3}
2	Corey Heim	2	3	3	6	1*^{2}	10	2	1*^{1}	28*^{12}	1*	36*	1*	3	1*^{12}	17	16	7	2^{2}	1*^{2}	11	**4***^{1}	7	2^{1}	4035	–	48^{2}
3	Christian Eckes	10	32^{1}	6	**1***	8	1*^{12}	4	3	4	6	10	2	1*^{12}	3	2*^{12}	**2**^{1}	3*^{2}	4	3	6	9	**1***^{12}	3	4034	–	39^{1}
4	Grant Enfinger	17	25	9	9	12	22	29	12	16	2	3	17	6	2	3	4*^{2}	13	17	9	1*^{2}	1^{2}	9	5	4032	–	7^{5}
NASCAR Craftsman Truck Series Playoffs cut-off
Pos.	Driver	DAY	ATL	LVS	BRI	COA	MAR	TEX	KAN	DAR	NWS	CLT	GTW	NSH	POC	IRP	RCH	MIL	BRI	KAN	TAL	HOM	MAR	PHO	Pts.	Stage	Bonus
5	Nick Sanchez	1*	5	17	17	18^{1}	4	**3**	6	**2**	7	1	3	13	13	10	30	4	5	12	22	13	5	4	2280	32	18^{4}
6	Taylor Gray	19	4	4	7	2	6	7	27	8	13	12	30	34	4	16	3	5	12	18	2	10	4	6	2247	24	3^{8}
7	Rajah Caruth	3	8	**1**	8	15	7	12	13	30	14	16	16	4	10	**8**	17	18	3^{1}	7	4	8	31	13	2213	8	10^{7}
8	Tyler Ankrum	11^{2}	7*	2	5	24	5	34	20	26	8^{2}	32	15	5	14	4	6	6	10	14	14	5	8	33	2183	2	7^{6}
9	Ben Rhodes	30	28	13	16	7	14	24	16	3	22	5	7	7	18	21	7	9	27	22	35	12	2	9	2150	7	2^{9}
10	Daniel Dye	21	**9**	24	13	28	13	6	9	23	9	19	12	2	16	27	8	8	32	27	3	7	32	24	2141	14	1^{10}
11	Layne Riggs **(R)**	33	33	22	10	27	15	31	18	21	3	28	5	25	30	5	5	1	1*	2	28	22	6	10	595	136	10
12	Stewart Friesen	14	23	18	22	20	19	13	25	14	10	2	8	**11**	7	33	25	20	9	24	13	6	10	18	557	76	–
13	Tanner Gray	16	19	20	15	10	16	8	7	10	16	**17**^{2}	11	14	19	20	12	11	23	6	30	20	29	11	550	58	1
14	Matt Crafton	7	13	7	4	23	12	15	10	31	20	31	20	23	8	24	15	10	6	25	23	11	13	19	524	42	–
15	Chase Purdy	28	15	16	33	22	3	25	**28**	6	24	13	6	21	6	13	20	23	7	11	25	26	3	12	513	48	–
16	Dean Thompson	24	10	30	23	9	33	16	8	29	27	9	14	28	9	9	32	19	14	13	32	15	17	15	469	51	–
17	Jake Garcia	34	16	11	14	14	21	19	17	20	21	6	24	10	21	30	13	21	21	21	29	24	20	14	459	49	–
18	Bayley Currey	13	30	28	11	16	17	14	11	22	19	26	29	29	17	14	23	29	15	8	36	31	16	21	392	16	–
19	Kaden Honeycutt		6		12		9		4			7^{1}		33			14	12	35	4	19	14	33	7	384	75	1
20	Bret Holmes	4	11	12	31	29	24	22	14	17	29	14	21	36	12	26	21	26	13	16	9				360	7	–
21	Timmy Hill	8	18	32	24	17	20	21	22	13	26	22	18	27	23	19	19	25	22	23	DNQ	23	21	22	349	–	–
22	Ty Dillon	35	14	26	20	11	23	23	15	9	25	24	13	15	25	18	9	16^{1}	30						334	19	–
23	Matt Mills	26	27	31	25	25	29	26	23	11	18	4	23	8	11	22	35	24	25	33	31^{1}	34	19	25	328	11	–
24	Lawless Alan	32	12	23	27	33	31	11	26	12	30	30	19	24	32	28	18	35	24	30	5	21	23	30	306	11	–
25	Spencer Boyd	5	22	29	30	30	25	27	31	19	32	20	26	22	36	34	24	28	29	28	10	27	22	28	267	–	–
26	Stefan Parsons	6			18	19		9			17	25		26			11		16		8			23	229	–	–
27	Jack Wood	18	31			13	18			25	12	21		16		15		15	26				26	35	228	18	–
28	Connor Mosack			19					30			8	22		15				20	10		3		8	227	29	–
29	Mason Massey	25	20	21	28	35	11	20	21	15	23	18	31	32	24	35	26								207	–	–
30	William Sawalich				21		26									12	22	14	11		**27**	17	14	32	197	23	–
31	Conner Jones **(R)**		29	14	19			18		24	35	11		12			31	22	36			25		17	191	5	–
32	Thad Moffitt **(R)**	36	26	25	26	32	27	32	24	18	31	33	28		29	32	33	32						27	138	–	–
33	Dawson Sutton										28			18						5	24	19	15	20	130	–	–
34	Mason Maggio	DNQ	24		29				29	27		27		35	27		28	27	31		18				105	–	–
35	Brett Moffitt								5			15											30	16	87	5	–
36	Keith McGee	31	21	27	32			28				34	27	DNQ			34		33		26			29	85	–	–
37	Luke Fenhaus												10		22	7									72	–	–
38	Brenden Queen										4			19						20					68	–	–
39	Johnny Sauter	29^{1}						17								23					34		28		65	12	1
40	Corey Day																		18	32		16	18		64	–	–
41	Colby Howard		17							7			32												55	–	–
42	Jason White	12																			20				42	–	–
43	Justin Carroll				36		32					DNQ		DNQ	28		27	34	DNQ				25		40	–	–
44	Cory Roper	22																			16				36	–	–
45	Andrés Pérez de Lara												9											31	34	–	–
46	Marco Andretti					31										25		31	DNQ	34		30			34	–	–
47	Bryan Dauzat	9												DNQ	34						QL^{†}				31	–	–
48	Ryan Reed																				7				30	–	–
49	Connor Hall																10								27	–	–
50	Cameron Waters						30		19																25	–	–
51	Justin Mondeik																		28	26		32			25	–	–
52	Clay Greenfield	DNQ																			15				22	–	–
53	Clint Bowyer													17											22	2	–
54	Frankie Muniz													31						29		33		34	21	–	–
55	Danny Bohn																				17				20	–	–
56	Kris Wright							30							26										18	–	–
57	Dawson Cram													20											17	–	–
58	Norm Benning																	DNQ			21		36		17	–	–
59	Carter Fartuch					21																			16	–	–
60	Clayton Green										34												24		16	–	–
61	Vicente Salas					34							25												15	–	–
62	Codie Rohrbaugh	23																							14	–	–
63	Matt Gould																	33					27		14	–	–
64	Memphis Villarreal							33				29													12	–	–
65	Nathan Byrd																			19^{‡}		29^{‡}		26	11	–	–
66	Dale Quarterley					26																			11	–	–
67	Stephen Mallozzi						28								35										11	–	–
68	Jennifer Jo Cobb	DNQ							32			DNQ								31					11	–	–
69	Toni Breidinger	27																							10	–	–
70	Tyler Tomassi															31			34						9	–	–
71	Akinori Ogata													30											7	–	–
72	Josh Reaume										33														4	–	–
73	Blake Lothian						34																		3	–	–
74	Trey Hutchens				35						36						DNQ								3	–	–
75	Jeffrey Earnhardt											35													2	–	–
76	Landen Lewis																						35		2	–	–
77	Jerry Bohlman																36								1	–	–
78	Jayson Alexander																	36							1	–	–
	Ryan Huff	DNQ																							0	–	–
Ineligible for Craftsman Truck championship points
Pos.	Driver	DAY	ATL	LVS	BRI	COA	MAR	TEX	KAN	DAR	NWS	CLT	GTW	NSH	POC	IRP	RCH	MIL	BRI	KAN	TAL	HOM	MAR	PHO	Pts.	Stage	Bonus
	Kyle Busch		1^{2}	15	2^{12}			1*^{12}		32																	
	Ross Chastain					5				1	15				5	11											
	Zane Smith			8	3			5	2^{2}						20												
	Connor Zilisch					**4**											29		**19**		33	18	12				
	Sammy Smith						8				5					6		17									
	Christopher Bell			5																							
	Jack Hawksworth					6																					
	Conor Daly															29				17		28					
	Corey LaJoie	20																									
	Dexter Bean																	30									
	Sage Karam														33												
	Dylan Lupton																						34				
	Aric Almirola										DNQ																
Pos.	Driver	DAY	ATL	LVS	BRI	COA	MAR	TEX	KAN	DAR	NWS	CLT	GTW	NSH	POC	IRP	RCH	MIL	BRI	KAN	TAL	HOM	MAR	PHO	Pts.	Stage	Bonus
^{†} – Bryan Dauzat qualified for the race at Talladega but was replaced by Keith McGee, who originally failed to qualify.^{‡} – Nathan Byrd started receiving points at Phoenix.

=== Owners' championship (Top 15) ===
(key) Bold – Pole position awarded by time. Italics – Pole position set by competition-based formula. * – Most laps led. ^{1} – Stage 1 winner. ^{2} – Stage 2 winner. ^{1-10} – Regular season top 10 finishers.
. – Eliminated after Round of 10 . – Eliminated after Round of 8

Pos.	No.	Car Owner	DAY	ATL	LVS	BRI	COA	MAR	TEX	KAN	DAR	NWS	CLT	GTW	NSH	POC	IRP	RCH	MIL	BRI	KAN	TAL	HOM	MAR	PHO	Points	Bonus
1	98	Mike Curb	**15**	2	10*^{12}	34	3	**2**	10	33	5	11^{1}	23	**4**^{12}	9	31	1	1	**2**	8	**15**^{1}	12	2	11	**1***^{2}	4040	24^{3}
2	11	David Gilliland	2	3	3	6	1*^{2}	10	2	1*^{1}	28*^{12}	1*	36*	1*	3	1*^{12}	17	16	7	2^{2}	1*^{2}	11	**4***^{1}	7	2^{1}	4035	48^{2}
3	19	Bill McAnally	10	32^{1}	6	**1***	8	1*^{12}	4	3	4	6	10	2	1*^{12}	3	2*^{12}	**2**^{1}	3*^{2}	4	3	6	9	**1***^{12}	3	4034	39^{1}
4	9	Larry Berg	17	25	9	9	12	22	29	12	16	2	3	17	6	2	3	4*^{2}	13	17	9	1*^{2}	1^{2}	9	5	4032	7^{5}
NASCAR Craftsman Truck Series Playoffs cut-off
5	2	Max Siegel	1*	5	17	17	18^{1}	4	**3**	6	**2**	7	1	3	13	13	10	30	4	5	12	22	13	5	4	2280	18^{4}
6	17	David Gilliland	19	4	4	7	2	6	7	27	8	13	12	30	34	4	16	3	5	12	18	2	10	4	6	2246	2^{9}
7	71	TJ Puchyr	3	8	**1**	8	15	7	12	13	30	14	16	16	4	10	**8**	17	18	3^{1}	7	4	8	31	13	2213	10^{7}
8	7	TJ Puchyr	20	1^{2}	15	2^{12}	**4**	8	1*^{12}	30	32	5	8	9	17	15	6	29	17	**19**	10	33	3	12	8	2192	3^{8}
9	18	Bill McAnally	11^{2}	7*	2	5	25	5	34	20	26	8^{2}	32	15	5	14	4	6	6	10	14	14	5	8	33	2183	7^{6}
10	45	Al Niece	29^{1}	6	19	12	5	9	17	4	1	15	7^{1}	22	33	5	11	14	12	35	4	19	14	33	7	2172	3^{10}
11	38	Bob Jenkins	33	33	22	10	27	15	31	18	21	3	28	5	25	30	5	5	1	1*	2	28	22	6	10	595	–
12	99	Duke Thorson	30	28	13	16	7	14	24	16	3	22	5	7	7	18	21	7	9	27	22	35	12	2	9	589	–
13	43	William Hilgemann	21	**9**	24	13	28	13	6	9	23	9	19	12	2	16	27	8	8	32	27	3	7	32	24	559	–
14	52	Chris Larsen	14	23	18	22	20	19	13	25	14	10	2	8	**11**	7	33	25	20	9	24	13	6	10	18	557	–
15	15	David Gilliland	16	19	20	15	10	16	8	7	10	16	**17**^{2}	11	14	19	20	12	11	23	6	30	20	29	11	550	1
Pos.	No.	Car Owner	DAY	ATL	LVS	BRI	COA	MAR	TEX	KAN	DAR	NWS	CLT	GTW	NSH	POC	IRP	RCH	MIL	BRI	KAN	TAL	HOM	MAR	PHO	Points	Bonus

=== Manufacturers' championship ===
Pos	Manufacturer	Wins	Points
1	Chevrolet	12	859
2	Toyota	6	804
3	Ford	5	780

== See also ==
- 2024 NASCAR Cup Series
- 2024 NASCAR Xfinity Series
- 2024 ARCA Menards Series
- 2024 ARCA Menards Series East
- 2024 ARCA Menards Series West
- 2024 NASCAR Whelen Modified Tour
- 2024 NASCAR Canada Series
- 2024 NASCAR Mexico Series
- 2024 NASCAR Whelen Euro Series
- 2024 NASCAR Brasil Sprint Race
- 2024 CARS Tour
- 2024 SMART Modified Tour
