= 2024 Baptist Health 200 =

21st race of the 2024 NASCAR Craftsman Truck Series

Race details
- Race 21 of 23 of the 2024 NASCAR Craftsman Truck Series
- Date: October 26, 2024
- Official name: 28th Annual Baptist Health 200
- Location: Homestead–Miami Speedway in Homestead, Florida
- Course: Permanent racing facility
- Course length: 1.5 miles (2.4 km)
- Distance: 201 laps, 134 mi (323 km)
- Scheduled distance: 134 laps, 201 mi (323 km)
- Average speed: 119.150 mph (191.753 km/h)

Pole position
| Driver | Corey Heim | Tricon Garage |
- Time: 32.715

Most laps led
| Driver | Corey Heim | Tricon Garage |
- Laps: 68

Winner
| No. 9 | Grant Enfinger | CR7 Motorsports |

Television in the United States
- Network: FS1
- Announcers: Jamie Little, Phil Parsons, and Michael Waltrip

Radio in the United States
- Radio: MRN

The 2024 Baptist Health 200 was the 21st stock car race of the 2024 NASCAR Craftsman Truck Series, the fifth race of the Playoffs, the second race of the Round of 8, and the 28th iteration of the event. The race was held on Saturday, October 26, 2024, at Homestead–Miami Speedway in Homestead, Florida, a 1.5 miles (2.4 km) permanent oval shaped racetrack. The race took the scheduled 134 laps to complete. In a fast-paced race, Grant Enfinger, driving for CR7 Motorsports, would take the lead late from Layne Riggs, and dominated the final stages of the race on fuel mileage to earn his 12th career NASCAR Craftsman Truck Series win, his second of the season, and his second consecutive win. Corey Heim started on the pole and led a race-high 68 laps, but was unable to catch Enfinger on his pit road strategy and finished 4th. To fill out the podium, Ty Majeski, driving for ThorSport Racing, and Connor Mosack, driving for Spire Motorsports, would finish 2nd and 3rd, respectively.

== Report ==
=== Background ===
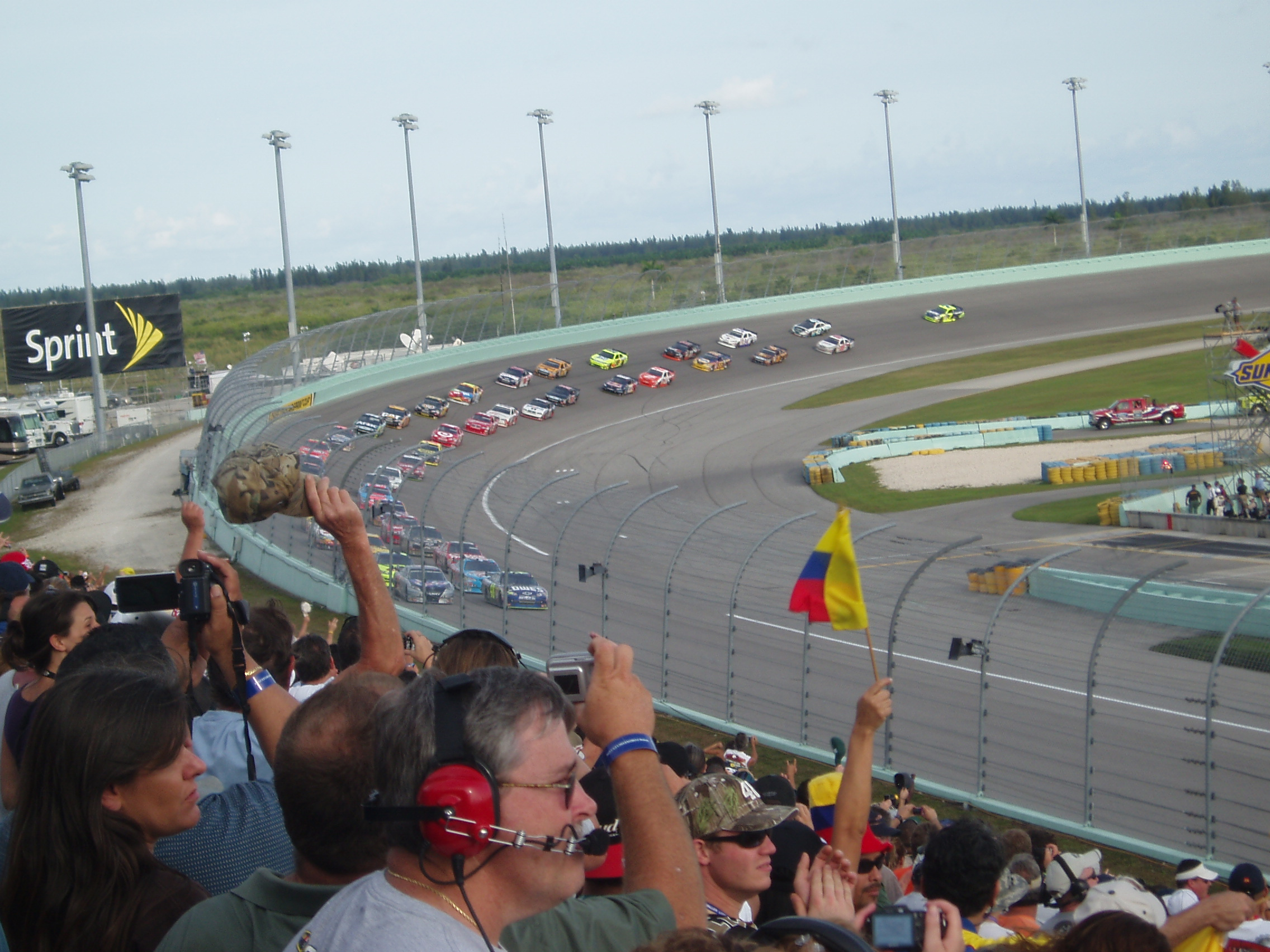
Homestead–Miami Speedway, the circuit where the race was held.

Homestead–Miami Speedway is a motor racing track located in Homestead, Florida. The track, which has several configurations, has promoted several series of racing, including NASCAR, the NTT IndyCar Series and the Grand-Am Rolex Sports Car Series.

From 2002 to 2019, Homestead-Miami Speedway has hosted the final race of the season in all three of NASCAR's series: the NASCAR Cup Series, Xfinity Series and Craftsman Truck Series. The track has since held races on different dates in 2020 (June) and 2021 (February), which were both effected by the COVID-19 pandemic, before being moved back into the Playoffs as the final race of the Round of 8 in 2022, with the date being kept for 2023.

==== Entry list ====
- (R) denotes rookie driver.
- (i) denotes driver who is ineligible for series driver points.
- (P) denotes playoff driver.

| # | Driver | Team | Make |
|---|---|---|---|
| 1 | William Sawalich | Tricon Garage | Toyota |
| 02 | Nathan Byrd (i) | Young's Motorsports | Chevrolet |
| 2 | Nick Sanchez (P) | Rev Racing | Chevrolet |
| 04 | Marco Andretti | Roper Racing | Chevrolet |
| 5 | Dean Thompson | Tricon Garage | Toyota |
| 7 | Connor Mosack | Spire Motorsports | Chevrolet |
| 9 | Grant Enfinger (P) | CR7 Motorsports | Chevrolet |
| 11 | Corey Heim (P) | Tricon Garage | Toyota |
| 13 | Jake Garcia | ThorSport Racing | Ford |
| 15 | Tanner Gray | Tricon Garage | Toyota |
| 17 | Taylor Gray (P) | Tricon Garage | Toyota |
| 18 | Tyler Ankrum (P) | McAnally-Hilgemann Racing | Chevrolet |
| 19 | Christian Eckes (P) | McAnally-Hilgemann Racing | Chevrolet |
| 22 | Frankie Muniz | Reaume Brothers Racing | Ford |
| 25 | Dawson Sutton | Rackley W.A.R. | Chevrolet |
| 33 | Lawless Alan | Reaume Brothers Racing | Ford |
| 38 | Layne Riggs (R) | Front Row Motorsports | Ford |
| 41 | Bayley Currey | Niece Motorsports | Chevrolet |
| 42 | Matt Mills | Niece Motorsports | Chevrolet |
| 43 | Daniel Dye | McAnally-Hilgemann Racing | Chevrolet |
| 44 | Conor Daly (i) | Niece Motorsports | Chevrolet |
| 45 | Kaden Honeycutt | Niece Motorsports | Chevrolet |
| 46 | Justin Mondeik | Young's Motorsports | Chevrolet |
| 52 | Stewart Friesen | Halmar Friesen Racing | Toyota |
| 56 | Timmy Hill | Hill Motorsports | Toyota |
| 66 | Conner Jones (R) | ThorSport Racing | Ford |
| 71 | Rajah Caruth (P) | Spire Motorsports | Chevrolet |
| 75 | Connor Zilisch (i) | Henderson Motorsports | Chevrolet |
| 76 | Spencer Boyd | Freedom Racing Enterprises | Chevrolet |
| 77 | Chase Purdy | Spire Motorsports | Chevrolet |
| 88 | Matt Crafton | ThorSport Racing | Ford |
| 91 | Corey Day | McAnally-Hilgemann Racing | Chevrolet |
| 98 | Ty Majeski (P) | ThorSport Racing | Ford |
| 99 | Ben Rhodes | ThorSport Racing | Ford |
Official entry list

== Practice ==
The first and only practice session was held on Friday, October 25, at 2:35 PM EST, and would last for 20 minutes. Nick Sanchez, driving for Rev Racing, would set the fastest time in the session, with a lap of 32.590, and a speed of 165.695 mph (266.660 km/h).

| Pos. | # | Driver | Team | Make | Time | Speed |
|---|---|---|---|---|---|---|
| 1 | 2 | Nick Sanchez (P) | Rev Racing | Chevrolet | 32.590 | 165.695 |
| 2 | 19 | Christian Eckes (P) | McAnally-Hilgemann Racing | Chevrolet | 32.834 | 164.464 |
| 3 | 17 | Taylor Gray (P) | Tricon Garage | Toyota | 32.968 | 163.795 |
Full practice results

== Qualifying ==
Qualifying was held on Friday, October 25, at 3:05 PM EST. Since Homestead–Miami Speedway is an intermediate racetrack, the qualifying system used is a single-car, one-lap system with only one round. Drivers will be on track by themselves and will have one lap to post a qualifying time, and whoever sets the fastest time will win the pole.

Corey Heim, driving for Tricon Garage, would score the pole for the race, with a lap of 32.715, and a speed of 165.062 mph (265.642 km/h).

No drivers would fail to qualify.

=== Qualifying results ===
| Pos. | # | Driver | Team | Make | Time | Speed |
|---|---|---|---|---|---|---|
| 1 | 11 | Corey Heim (P) | Tricon Garage | Toyota | 32.715 | 165.062 |
| 2 | 17 | Taylor Gray (P) | Tricon Garage | Toyota | 32.789 | 164.689 |
| 3 | 71 | Rajah Caruth (P) | Spire Motorsports | Chevrolet | 32.816 | 164.554 |
| 4 | 2 | Nick Sanchez (P) | Rev Racing | Chevrolet | 32.840 | 164.434 |
| 5 | 98 | Ty Majeski (P) | ThorSport Racing | Ford | 32.882 | 164.224 |
| 6 | 45 | Kaden Honeycutt | Niece Motorsports | Chevrolet | 32.907 | 164.099 |
| 7 | 43 | Daniel Dye | McAnally-Hilgemann Racing | Chevrolet | 33.012 | 163.577 |
| 8 | 19 | Christian Eckes (P) | McAnally-Hilgemann Racing | Chevrolet | 33.025 | 163.512 |
| 9 | 9 | Grant Enfinger (P) | CR7 Motorsports | Chevrolet | 33.048 | 163.399 |
| 10 | 7 | Connor Mosack | Spire Motorsports | Chevrolet | 33.053 | 163.374 |
| 11 | 41 | Bayley Currey | Niece Motorsports | Chevrolet | 33.073 | 163.275 |
| 12 | 52 | Stewart Friesen | Halmar Friesen Racing | Toyota | 33.093 | 163.177 |
| 13 | 38 | Layne Riggs (R) | Front Row Motorsports | Ford | 33.106 | 163.112 |
| 14 | 25 | Dawson Sutton | Rackley W.A.R. | Chevrolet | 33.125 | 163.019 |
| 15 | 18 | Tyler Ankrum (P) | McAnally-Hilgemann Racing | Chevrolet | 33.128 | 163.004 |
| 16 | 75 | Connor Zilisch (i) | Henderson Motorsports | Chevrolet | 33.223 | 162.538 |
| 17 | 77 | Chase Purdy | Spire Motorsports | Chevrolet | 33.272 | 162.299 |
| 18 | 5 | Dean Thompson | Tricon Garage | Toyota | 33.382 | 161.764 |
| 19 | 99 | Ben Rhodes | ThorSport Racing | Ford | 33.391 | 161.720 |
| 20 | 1 | William Sawalich | Tricon Garage | Toyota | 33.435 | 161.507 |
| 21 | 91 | Corey Day | McAnally-Hilgemann Racing | Chevrolet | 33.461 | 161.382 |
| 22 | 88 | Matt Crafton | ThorSport Racing | Ford | 33.599 | 160.719 |
| 23 | 66 | Conner Jones (R) | ThorSport Racing | Ford | 33.630 | 160.571 |
| 24 | 42 | Matt Mills | Niece Motorsports | Chevrolet | 33.646 | 160.495 |
| 25 | 56 | Timmy Hill | Hill Motorsports | Toyota | 33.741 | 160.043 |
| 26 | 13 | Jake Garcia | ThorSport Racing | Ford | 33.748 | 160.009 |
| 27 | 33 | Lawless Alan | Reaume Brothers Racing | Ford | 33.790 | 159.811 |
| 28 | 44 | Conor Daly (i) | Niece Motorsports | Chevrolet | 34.150 | 158.126 |
| 29 | 02 | Nathan Byrd (i) | Young's Motorsports | Chevrolet | 34.406 | 156.949 |
| 30 | 04 | Marco Andretti | Roper Racing | Chevrolet | 34.453 | 156.735 |
| 31 | 22 | Frankie Muniz | Reaume Brothers Racing | Ford | 34.619 | 155.984 |
Qualified by owner's points
| 32 | 46 | Justin Mondeik | Young's Motorsports | Chevrolet | 35.011 | 154.237 |
| 33 | 15 | Tanner Gray | Tricon Garage | Toyota | – | – |
| 34 | 76 | Spencer Boyd | Freedom Racing Enterprises | Chevrolet | – | – |
Official qualifying results
Official starting lineup

== Race results ==
Stage 1 Laps: 30

| Pos. | # | Driver | Team | Make | Pts |
|---|---|---|---|---|---|
| 1 | 11 | Corey Heim (P) | Tricon Garage | Toyota | 10 |
| 2 | 45 | Kaden Honeycutt | Niece Motorsports | Chevrolet | 9 |
| 3 | 98 | Ty Majeski (P) | ThorSport Racing | Ford | 8 |
| 4 | 17 | Taylor Gray (P) | Tricon Garage | Toyota | 7 |
| 5 | 19 | Christian Eckes (P) | McAnally-Hilgemann Racing | Chevrolet | 6 |
| 6 | 9 | Grant Enfinger (P) | CR7 Motorsports | Chevrolet | 5 |
| 7 | 7 | Connor Mosack | Spire Motorsports | Chevrolet | 4 |
| 8 | 2 | Nick Sanchez (P) | Rev Racing | Chevrolet | 3 |
| 9 | 71 | Rajah Caruth (P) | Spire Motorsports | Chevrolet | 2 |
| 10 | 5 | Dean Thompson | Tricon Garage | Toyota | 1 |

Stage 2 Laps: 30

| Pos. | # | Driver | Team | Make | Pts |
|---|---|---|---|---|---|
| 1 | 9 | Grant Enfinger (P) | CR7 Motorsports | Chevrolet | 10 |
| 2 | 11 | Corey Heim (P) | Tricon Garage | Toyota | 9 |
| 3 | 19 | Christian Eckes (P) | McAnally-Hilgemann Racing | Chevrolet | 8 |
| 4 | 98 | Ty Majeski (P) | ThorSport Racing | Ford | 7 |
| 5 | 45 | Kaden Honeycutt | Niece Motorsports | Chevrolet | 6 |
| 6 | 17 | Taylor Gray (P) | Tricon Garage | Toyota | 5 |
| 7 | 43 | Daniel Dye | McAnally-Hilgemann Racing | Chevrolet | 4 |
| 8 | 7 | Connor Mosack | Spire Motorsports | Chevrolet | 3 |
| 9 | 71 | Rajah Caruth (P) | Spire Motorsports | Chevrolet | 2 |
| 10 | 88 | Matt Crafton | ThorSport Racing | Ford | 1 |

Stage 3 Laps: 84

| Fin | St | # | Driver | Team | Make | Laps | Led | Status | Pts |
|---|---|---|---|---|---|---|---|---|---|
| 1 | 9 | 9 | Grant Enfinger (P) | CR7 Motorsports | Chevrolet | 134 | 32 | Running | 55 |
| 2 | 5 | 98 | Ty Majeski (P) | ThorSport Racing | Ford | 134 | 0 | Running | 50 |
| 3 | 10 | 7 | Connor Mosack | Spire Motorsports | Chevrolet | 134 | 0 | Running | 41 |
| 4 | 1 | 11 | Corey Heim (P) | Tricon Garage | Toyota | 134 | 68 | Running | 52 |
| 5 | 15 | 18 | Tyler Ankrum (P) | McAnally-Hilgemann Racing | Chevrolet | 134 | 0 | Running | 32 |
| 6 | 12 | 52 | Stewart Friesen | Halmar Friesen Racing | Toyota | 134 | 0 | Running | 31 |
| 7 | 7 | 43 | Daniel Dye | McAnally-Hilgemann Racing | Chevrolet | 134 | 0 | Running | 34 |
| 8 | 3 | 71 | Rajah Caruth (P) | Spire Motorsports | Chevrolet | 134 | 0 | Running | 33 |
| 9 | 8 | 19 | Christian Eckes (P) | McAnally-Hilgemann Racing | Chevrolet | 134 | 3 | Running | 42 |
| 10 | 2 | 17 | Taylor Gray (P) | Tricon Garage | Toyota | 134 | 4 | Running | 39 |
| 11 | 22 | 88 | Matt Crafton | ThorSport Racing | Ford | 134 | 0 | Running | 27 |
| 12 | 19 | 99 | Ben Rhodes | ThorSport Racing | Ford | 134 | 0 | Running | 25 |
| 13 | 4 | 2 | Nick Sanchez (P) | Rev Racing | Chevrolet | 134 | 0 | Running | 27 |
| 14 | 6 | 45 | Kaden Honeycutt | Niece Motorsports | Chevrolet | 133 | 0 | Running | 38 |
| 15 | 18 | 5 | Dean Thompson | Tricon Garage | Toyota | 133 | 0 | Running | 23 |
| 16 | 21 | 91 | Corey Day | McAnally-Hilgemann Racing | Chevrolet | 133 | 0 | Running | 21 |
| 17 | 20 | 1 | William Sawalich | Tricon Garage | Toyota | 133 | 0 | Running | 20 |
| 18 | 16 | 75 | Connor Zilisch (i) | Henderson Motorsports | Chevrolet | 133 | 0 | Running | 0 |
| 19 | 14 | 25 | Dawson Sutton | Rackley W.A.R. | Chevrolet | 133 | 0 | Running | 18 |
| 20 | 33 | 15 | Tanner Gray | Tricon Garage | Toyota | 133 | 0 | Running | 17 |
| 21 | 27 | 33 | Lawless Alan | Reaume Brothers Racing | Ford | 133 | 0 | Running | 16 |
| 22 | 13 | 38 | Layne Riggs (R) | Front Row Motorsports | Ford | 133 | 27 | Running | 15 |
| 23 | 25 | 56 | Timmy Hill | Hill Motorsports | Toyota | 132 | 0 | Running | 14 |
| 24 | 26 | 13 | Jake Garcia | ThorSport Racing | Ford | 132 | 0 | Running | 13 |
| 25 | 23 | 66 | Conner Jones (R) | ThorSport Racing | Ford | 132 | 0 | Running | 12 |
| 26 | 17 | 77 | Chase Purdy | Spire Motorsports | Chevrolet | 131 | 0 | Running | 11 |
| 27 | 34 | 76 | Spencer Boyd | Freedom Racing Enterprises | Chevrolet | 131 | 0 | Running | 10 |
| 28 | 28 | 44 | Conor Daly (i) | Niece Motorsports | Chevrolet | 131 | 0 | Running | 0 |
| 29 | 29 | 02 | Nathan Byrd (i) | Young's Motorsports | Chevrolet | 130 | 0 | Running | 0 |
| 30 | 30 | 04 | Marco Andretti | Roper Racing | Chevrolet | 127 | 0 | Running | 7 |
| 31 | 11 | 41 | Bayley Currey | Niece Motorsports | Chevrolet | 125 | 0 | Running | 6 |
| 32 | 32 | 46 | Justin Mondeik | Young's Motorsports | Chevrolet | 114 | 0 | Running | 5 |
| 33 | 31 | 22 | Frankie Muniz | Reaume Brothers Racing | Ford | 105 | 0 | Running | 4 |
| 34 | 24 | 42 | Matt Mills | Niece Motorsports | Chevrolet | 74 | 0 | Accident | 3 |
Official race results

== Standings after the race ==
Drivers' Championship standings

| | Pos | Driver | Points |
|---|---|---|---|
| | 1 | Corey Heim | 3,130 |
| 1 | 2 | Grant Enfinger | 3,121 (-9) |
| 1 | 3 | Christian Eckes | 3,119 (–11) |
| | 4 | Ty Majeski | 3,103 (–27) |
| | 5 | Rajah Caruth | 3,081 (–49) |
| | 6 | Taylor Gray | 3,079 (–51) |
| 1 | 7 | Tyler Ankrum | 3,062 (–68) |
| 1 | 8 | Nick Sanchez | 3,060 (–70) |
| | 9 | Daniel Dye | 2,123 (–1,007) |
| | 10 | Ben Rhodes | 2,082 (–1,048) |
Official driver's standings

Manufacturers' Championship standings

| Pos | Manufacturer | Points |
|---|---|---|
| 1 | Chevrolet | 785 |
| 2 | Toyota | 736 (-49) |
| 3 | Ford | 705 (–80) |

- Note: Only the first 10 positions are included for the driver standings.

| Previous race: 2024 Love's RV Stop 225 | NASCAR Craftsman Truck Series; 2024 season | Next race: 2024 Zip Buy Now, Pay Later 200 |
