= 2024 UNOH 200 =

18th race of the 2024 NASCAR Craftsman Truck Series

2024 UNOH 200 presented by Ohio Logistics
Race details
- Race 18 of 23 of the 2024 NASCAR Craftsman Truck Series
- Date: September 19, 2024
- Official name: 27th Annual UNOH 200 presented by Ohio Logistics
- Location: Bristol Motor Speedway in Bristol, Tennessee
- Course: Permanent racing facility
- Course length: 0.533 miles (0.858 km)
- Distance: 200 laps, 106 mi (171 km)
- Scheduled distance: 200 laps, 106 mi (171 km)
- Average speed: 79.552 mph (128.027 km/h)

Pole position
| Driver | Connor Zilisch | Spire Motorsports |
- Time: 15.325

Most laps led
| Driver | Layne Riggs | Front Row Motorsports |
- Laps: 80

Winner
| No. 38 | Layne Riggs | Front Row Motorsports |

Television in the United States
- Network: FS1
- Announcers: Adam Alexander, Phil Parsons, and Michael Waltrip

Radio in the United States
- Radio: MRN

The 2024 UNOH 200 presented by Ohio Logistics was the 20th stock car race of the 2024 NASCAR Craftsman Truck Series, the second race of the Round of 8, and the 27th iteration of the event. The race was held on Thursday, September 19, 2024, at Bristol Motor Speedway in Bristol, Tennessee, a 0.533 miles (0.858 km) permanent oval shaped racetrack. The race took the scheduled 200 laps to complete. Layne Riggs, driving for Front Row Motorsports, would pass Corey Heim late in the race, holding him off in multiple late-race restarts to earn his second career NASCAR Craftsman Truck Series win, and his second consecutive victory. Riggs would also lead a race-high 80 laps in the event. To fill out the podium, Heim, driving for Tricon Garage, and Rajah Caruth, driving for Spire Motorsports, would finish 2nd and 3rd respectively.

== Report ==
=== Background ===
The Bristol Motor Speedway, formerly known as Bristol International Raceway and Bristol Raceway, is a NASCAR short track venue located in Bristol, Tennessee. Constructed in 1960, it held its first NASCAR race on July 30, 1961. Despite its short length, Bristol is among the most popular tracks on the NASCAR schedule because of its distinct features, which include extraordinarily steep banking, an all concrete surface, two pit roads, and stadium-like seating. It has also been named one of the loudest NASCAR tracks.

==== Entry list ====
- (R) denotes rookie driver.
- (i) denotes driver who is ineligible for series driver points.
- (P) denotes playoff driver.
- (OP) denotes owner's playoff truck.

| # | Driver | Team | Make |
|---|---|---|---|
| 1 | William Sawalich | Tricon Garage | Toyota |
| 02 | Justin Mondeik | Young's Motorsports | Chevrolet |
| 2 | Nick Sanchez | Rev Racing | Chevrolet |
| 04 | Marco Andretti | Roper Racing | Chevrolet |
| 5 | Dean Thompson | Tricon Garage | Toyota |
| 7 | Connor Zilisch (i) (OP) | Spire Motorsports | Chevrolet |
| 9 | Grant Enfinger (P) | CR7 Motorsports | Chevrolet |
| 11 | Corey Heim (P) | Tricon Garage | Toyota |
| 13 | Jake Garcia | ThorSport Racing | Ford |
| 15 | Tanner Gray | Tricon Garage | Toyota |
| 17 | Taylor Gray (P) | Tricon Garage | Toyota |
| 18 | Tyler Ankrum (P) | McAnally-Hilgemann Racing | Chevrolet |
| 19 | Christian Eckes (P) | McAnally-Hilgemann Racing | Chevrolet |
| 21 | Mason Maggio | Floridian Motorsports | Ford |
| 22 | Keith McGee | Reaume Brothers Racing | Ford |
| 25 | Ty Dillon | Rackley WAR | Chevrolet |
| 32 | Bret Holmes | Bret Holmes Racing | Chevrolet |
| 33 | Lawless Alan | Reaume Brothers Racing | Ford |
| 38 | Layne Riggs (R) | Front Row Motorsports | Ford |
| 41 | Connor Mosack | Niece Motorsports | Chevrolet |
| 42 | Matt Mills | Niece Motorsports | Chevrolet |
| 43 | Daniel Dye (P) | McAnally-Hilgemann Racing | Chevrolet |
| 44 | Bayley Currey | Niece Motorsports | Chevrolet |
| 45 | Kaden Honeycutt (OP) | Niece Motorsports | Chevrolet |
| 46 | Tyler Tomassi | Young’s Motorsports | Chevrolet |
| 52 | Stewart Friesen | Halmar Friesen Racing | Toyota |
| 56 | Timmy Hill | Hill Motorsports | Toyota |
| 66 | Conner Jones (R) | ThorSport Racing | Ford |
| 71 | Rajah Caruth (P) | Spire Motorsports | Chevrolet |
| 75 | Stefan Parsons | Henderson Motorsports | Chevrolet |
| 76 | Spencer Boyd | Freedom Racing Enterprises | Chevrolet |
| 77 | Chase Purdy | Spire Motorsports | Chevrolet |
| 81 | Corey Day | McAnally-Hilgemann Racing | Chevrolet |
| 88 | Matt Crafton | ThorSport Racing | Ford |
| 90 | Justin Carroll | TC Motorsports | Toyota |
| 91 | Jack Wood | McAnally-Hilgemann Racing | Chevrolet |
| 98 | Ty Majeski (P) | ThorSport Racing | Ford |
| 99 | Ben Rhodes (P) | ThorSport Racing | Ford |
Official entry list

== Practice ==
For practice, drivers will be separated into two groups, Group A and B. Both sessions will be 15 minutes long, and was held on Thursday, September 19, at 3:00 PM EST. Nick Sanchez, driving for Rev Racing, would set the fastest time between both sessions, with a lap of 15.889, and a speed of 120.763 mph (194.349 km/h).

| Pos. | # | Driver | Team | Make | Time | Speed |
|---|---|---|---|---|---|---|
| 1 | 2 | Nick Sanchez (P) | Rev Racing | Chevrolet | 15.889 | 120.763 |
| 2 | 9 | Grant Enfinger (P) | CR7 Motorsports | Chevrolet | 15.924 | 120.497 |
| 3 | 38 | Layne Riggs (R) | Front Row Motorsports | Ford | 15.939 | 120.384 |
Full practice results

== Qualifying ==
Qualifying was held on Thursday September 19, at 3:35 PM EST. Since Bristol Motor Speedway is a short track, the qualifying system used is a single-car, two-lap system with only one round. Drivers will be on track by themselves and will have two laps to post a qualifying time, and whoever sets the fastest time will win the pole.

Connor Zilisch, driving for Spire Motorsports, would score the pole for the race, with a lap of 15.325, and a speed of 125.207 mph (201.501 km/h).

Two drivers would fail to qualify: Marco Andretti and Justin Carroll.

=== Qualifying results ===
| Pos. | # | Driver | Team | Make | Time | Speed |
|---|---|---|---|---|---|---|
| 1 | 7 | Connor Zilisch (i) (OP) | Spire Motorsports | Chevrolet | 15.325 | 125.207 |
| 2 | 11 | Corey Heim (P) | Tricon Garage | Toyota | 15.451 | 124.186 |
| 3 | 71 | Rajah Caruth (P) | Spire Motorsports | Chevrolet | 15.451 | 124.186 |
| 4 | 1 | William Sawalich | Tricon Garage | Toyota | 15.477 | 123.978 |
| 5 | 52 | Stewart Friesen | Halmar Friesen Racing | Toyota | 15.486 | 123.905 |
| 6 | 2 | Nick Sanchez (P) | Rev Racing | Chevrolet | 15.495 | 123.833 |
| 7 | 43 | Daniel Dye (P) | McAnally-Hilgemann Racing | Chevrolet | 15.520 | 123.634 |
| 8 | 19 | Christian Eckes (P) | McAnally-Hilgemann Racing | Chevrolet | 15.527 | 123.578 |
| 9 | 77 | Chase Purdy | Spire Motorsports | Chevrolet | 15.536 | 123.507 |
| 10 | 15 | Tanner Gray | Tricon Garage | Toyota | 15.573 | 123.213 |
| 11 | 88 | Matt Crafton | ThorSport Racing | Ford | 15.593 | 123.055 |
| 12 | 25 | Ty Dillon | Rackley WAR | Chevrolet | 15.596 | 123.032 |
| 13 | 75 | Stefan Parsons | Henderson Motorsports | Chevrolet | 15.604 | 122.968 |
| 14 | 18 | Tyler Ankrum (P) | McAnally-Hilgemann Racing | Chevrolet | 15.615 | 122.882 |
| 15 | 9 | Grant Enfinger (P) | CR7 Motorsports | Chevrolet | 15.619 | 122.850 |
| 16 | 17 | Taylor Gray (P) | Tricon Garage | Toyota | 15.622 | 122.827 |
| 17 | 5 | Dean Thompson | Tricon Garage | Toyota | 15.627 | 122.787 |
| 18 | 38 | Layne Riggs (R) | Front Row Motorsports | Ford | 15.649 | 122.615 |
| 19 | 98 | Ty Majeski (P) | ThorSport Racing | Ford | 15.687 | 122.318 |
| 20 | 41 | Connor Mosack | Niece Motorsports | Chevrolet | 15.730 | 121.983 |
| 21 | 13 | Jake Garcia | ThorSport Racing | Ford | 15.772 | 121.659 |
| 22 | 81 | Corey Day | McAnally-Hilgemann Racing | Chevrolet | 15.780 | 121.597 |
| 23 | 66 | Conner Jones (R) | ThorSport Racing | Ford | 15.789 | 121.528 |
| 24 | 91 | Jack Wood | McAnally-Hilgemann Racing | Chevrolet | 15.792 | 121.505 |
| 25 | 99 | Ben Rhodes (P) | ThorSport Racing | Ford | 15.819 | 121.297 |
| 26 | 44 | Bayley Currey | Niece Motorsports | Chevrolet | 15.826 | 121.244 |
| 27 | 56 | Timmy Hill | Hill Motorsports | Toyota | 15.829 | 121.221 |
| 28 | 32 | Bret Holmes | Bret Holmes Racing | Chevrolet | 15.892 | 120.740 |
| 29 | 33 | Lawless Alan | Reaume Brothers Racing | Ford | 15.908 | 120.619 |
| 30 | 42 | Matt Mills | Niece Motorsports | Chevrolet | 15.966 | 120.180 |
| 31 | 76 | Spencer Boyd | Freedom Racing Enterprises | Chevrolet | 15.988 | 120.015 |
Qualified by owner's points
| 32 | 21 | Mason Maggio | Floridian Motorsports | Ford | 16.127 | 118.981 |
| 33 | 46 | Tyler Tomassi | Young's Motorsports | Chevrolet | 16.143 | 118.863 |
| 34 | 22 | Keith McGee | Reaume Brothers Racing | Ford | 16.323 | 117.552 |
| 35 | 02 | Justin Mondeik | Young's Motorsports | Chevrolet | 16.492 | 116.347 |
| 36 | 45 | Kaden Honeycutt (OP) | Niece Motorsports | Chevrolet | – | – |
Failed to qualify
| 37 | 04 | Marco Andretti | Roper Racing | Chevrolet | 16.143 | 118.863 |
| 38 | 90 | Justin Carroll | TC Motorsports | Toyota | 16.410 | 116.929 |
Official qualifying results
Official starting lineup

== Race results ==
Stage 1 Laps: 55

| Pos. | # | Driver | Team | Make | Pts |
|---|---|---|---|---|---|
| 1 | 71 | Rajah Caruth (P) | Spire Motorsports | Chevrolet | 10 |
| 2 | 11 | Corey Heim (P) | Tricon Garage | Toyota | 9 |
| 3 | 19 | Christian Eckes (P) | McAnally-Hilgemann Racing | Chevrolet | 8 |
| 4 | 7 | Connor Zilisch (i) (OP) | Spire Motorsports | Chevrolet | 0 |
| 5 | 2 | Nick Sanchez (P) | Rev Racing | Chevrolet | 6 |
| 6 | 52 | Stewart Friesen | Halmar Friesen Racing | Toyota | 5 |
| 7 | 1 | William Sawalich | Tricon Garage | Toyota | 4 |
| 8 | 38 | Layne Riggs (R) | Front Row Motorsports | Ford | 3 |
| 9 | 77 | Chase Purdy | Spire Motorsports | Chevrolet | 2 |
| 10 | 43 | Daniel Dye (P) | McAnally-Hilgemann Racing | Chevrolet | 1 |

Stage 2 Laps: 55

| Pos. | # | Driver | Team | Make | Pts |
|---|---|---|---|---|---|
| 1 | 11 | Corey Heim (P) | Tricon Garage | Toyota | 10 |
| 2 | 19 | Christian Eckes (P) | McAnally-Hilgemann Racing | Chevrolet | 9 |
| 3 | 71 | Rajah Caruth (P) | Spire Motorsports | Chevrolet | 8 |
| 4 | 38 | Layne Riggs (R) | Front Row Motorsports | Ford | 7 |
| 5 | 2 | Nick Sanchez (P) | Rev Racing | Chevrolet | 6 |
| 6 | 52 | Stewart Friesen | Halmar Friesen Racing | Toyota | 5 |
| 7 | 1 | William Sawalich | Tricon Garage | Toyota | 4 |
| 8 | 88 | Matt Crafton | ThorSport Racing | Ford | 3 |
| 9 | 5 | Dean Thompson | Tricon Garage | Toyota | 2 |
| 10 | 77 | Chase Purdy | Spire Motorsports | Chevrolet | 1 |

Stage 3 Laps: 90

| Pos. | St | # | Driver | Team | Make | Laps | Led | Status | Pts |
|---|---|---|---|---|---|---|---|---|---|
| 1 | 18 | 38 | Layne Riggs (R) | Front Row Motorsports | Ford | 200 | 80 | Running | 50 |
| 2 | 2 | 11 | Corey Heim (P) | Tricon Garage | Toyota | 200 | 65 | Running | 54 |
| 3 | 3 | 71 | Rajah Caruth (P) | Spire Motorsports | Chevrolet | 200 | 9 | Running | 52 |
| 4 | 8 | 19 | Christian Eckes (P) | McAnally-Hilgemann Racing | Chevrolet | 200 | 0 | Running | 50 |
| 5 | 6 | 2 | Nick Sanchez (P) | Rev Racing | Chevrolet | 200 | 0 | Running | 44 |
| 6 | 11 | 88 | Matt Crafton | ThorSport Racing | Ford | 200 | 0 | Running | 34 |
| 7 | 9 | 77 | Chase Purdy | Spire Motorsports | Chevrolet | 200 | 0 | Running | 33 |
| 8 | 19 | 98 | Ty Majeski (P) | ThorSport Racing | Ford | 200 | 0 | Running | 29 |
| 9 | 5 | 52 | Stewart Friesen | Halmar Friesen Racing | Toyota | 200 | 0 | Running | 38 |
| 10 | 14 | 18 | Tyler Ankrum (P) | McAnally-Hilgemann Racing | Chevrolet | 200 | 0 | Running | 27 |
| 11 | 4 | 1 | William Sawalich | Tricon Garage | Toyota | 200 | 0 | Running | 34 |
| 12 | 16 | 17 | Taylor Gray (P) | Tricon Garage | Toyota | 200 | 0 | Running | 25 |
| 13 | 28 | 32 | Bret Holmes | Bret Holmes Racing | Chevrolet | 200 | 0 | Running | 24 |
| 14 | 17 | 5 | Dean Thompson | Tricon Garage | Toyota | 200 | 0 | Running | 25 |
| 15 | 26 | 44 | Bayley Currey | Niece Motorsports | Chevrolet | 200 | 0 | Running | 22 |
| 16 | 13 | 75 | Stefan Parsons | Henderson Motorsports | Chevrolet | 200 | 0 | Running | 21 |
| 17 | 15 | 9 | Grant Enfinger (P) | CR7 Motorsports | Chevrolet | 200 | 0 | Running | 20 |
| 18 | 22 | 81 | Corey Day | McAnally-Hilgemann Racing | Chevrolet | 200 | 0 | Running | 19 |
| 19 | 1 | 7 | Connor Zilisch (i) (OP) | Spire Motorsports | Chevrolet | 200 | 41 | Running | 0 |
| 20 | 20 | 41 | Connor Mosack | Niece Motorsports | Chevrolet | 200 | 0 | Running | 17 |
| 21 | 21 | 13 | Jake Garcia | ThorSport Racing | Ford | 200 | 0 | Running | 16 |
| 22 | 27 | 56 | Timmy Hill | Hill Motorsports | Toyota | 200 | 5 | Running | 15 |
| 23 | 10 | 15 | Tanner Gray | Tricon Garage | Toyota | 200 | 0 | Running | 14 |
| 24 | 29 | 33 | Lawless Alan | Reaume Brothers Racing | Ford | 199 | 0 | Running | 13 |
| 25 | 30 | 42 | Matt Mills | Niece Motorsports | Chevrolet | 199 | 0 | Running | 12 |
| 26 | 24 | 91 | Jack Wood | McAnally-Hilgemann Racing | Chevrolet | 199 | 0 | Running | 11 |
| 27 | 25 | 99 | Ben Rhodes (P) | ThorSport Racing | Ford | 198 | 0 | Running | 10 |
| 28 | 35 | 02 | Justin Mondeik | Young's Motorsports | Chevrolet | 198 | 0 | Running | 9 |
| 29 | 31 | 76 | Spencer Boyd | Freedom Racing Enterprises | Chevrolet | 198 | 0 | Running | 8 |
| 30 | 12 | 25 | Ty Dillon | Rackley WAR | Chevrolet | 198 | 0 | Running | 7 |
| 31 | 32 | 21 | Mason Maggio | Floridian Motorsports | Ford | 196 | 0 | Running | 6 |
| 32 | 7 | 43 | Daniel Dye (P) | McAnally-Hilgemann Racing | Chevrolet | 194 | 0 | Running | 6 |
| 33 | 34 | 22 | Keith McGee | Reaume Brothers Racing | Ford | 194 | 0 | Running | 4 |
| 34 | 33 | 46 | Tyler Tomassi | Young's Motorsports | Chevrolet | 192 | 0 | Running | 3 |
| 35 | 36 | 45 | Kaden Honeycutt (OP) | Niece Motorsports | Chevrolet | 157 | 0 | Accident | 2 |
| 36 | 23 | 66 | Conner Jones (R) | ThorSport Racing | Ford | 126 | 0 | Overheating | 1 |
Official race results

== Standings after the race ==
Drivers' Championship standings

| | Pos | Driver | Points |
|---|---|---|---|
| | 1 | Christian Eckes | 2,140 |
| 1 | 2 | Corey Heim | 2,125 (-15) |
| 1 | 3 | Nick Sanchez | 2,108 (–32) |
| 2 | 4 | Ty Majeski | 2,103 (–37) |
| 5 | 5 | Rajah Caruth | 2,080 (–60) |
| | 6 | Tyler Ankrum | 2,070 (–70) |
| 2 | 7 | Taylor Gray | 2,068 (–72) |
| | 8 | Grant Enfinger | 2,052 (–88) |
| 2 | 9 | Daniel Dye | 2,045 (–95) |
| 1 | 10 | Ben Rhodes | 2,040 (–100) |
Official driver's standings

Manufacturers' Championship standings

| Pos | Manufacturer | Points |
|---|---|---|
| 1 | Chevrolet | 671 |
| 2 | Toyota | 628 (-43) |
| 3 | Ford | 603 (–68) |

- Note: Only the first 10 positions are included for the driver standings.

| Previous race: 2024 LiUNA! 175 | NASCAR Craftsman Truck Series; 2024 season | Next race: 2024 Kubota Tractor 200 |
