= 2024 Clean Harbors 250 =

15th race of the 2024 NASCAR Craftsman Truck Series

Race details
- Race 16 of 23 of the 2024 NASCAR Craftsman Truck Series
- Date: August 10, 2024
- Location: Richmond Raceway in Richmond, Virginia
- Course: Permanent racing facility
- Course length: 0.750 miles (1.207 km)
- Distance: 250 laps, 187 mi (301 km)
- Scheduled distance: 250 laps, 187 mi (301 km)
- Average speed: 77.426 mph (124.605 km/h)

Pole position
Driver	Christian Eckes	McAnally-Hilgemann Racing
- Time: 22.755

Most laps led
Driver	Grant Enfinger	CR7 Motorsports
- Laps: 98

Winner
No. 98	Ty Majeski	ThorSport Racing

Television in the United States
- Network: FS1
- Announcers: Jamie Little, Phil Parsons, and Michael Waltrip

Radio in the United States
- Radio: MRN

The 2024 Clean Harbors 250 was the 16th stock car race of the 2024 NASCAR Craftsman Truck Series, the final race of the regular season, and the 5th iteration of the event. The race was held on Saturday, August 10, 2024, at Richmond Raceway in Richmond, Virginia, a 0.750 miles (1.207 km) permanent quad-oval shaped racetrack. The race took the scheduled 250 laps to complete. Ty Majeski, driving for ThorSport Racing, would take the lead from Christian Eckes late in the race to earn his fifth career NASCAR Craftsman Truck Series win, and won back to back races. Grant Enfinger led a race-high 98 laps. To fill out the podium, Christian Eckes, driving for McAnally-Hilgemann Racing and Taylor Gray, driving for Tricon Garage, would finish 2nd and 3rd, respectively.

== Report ==
=== Background ===
Richmond Raceway, the circuit where the race was held.

Richmond Raceway (RR), formerly known as Richmond International Raceway (RIR), is a 3/4-mile (1.2 km), D-shaped, asphalt race track located just outside Richmond, Virginia, in Henrico County. It hosts the NASCAR Cup Series, the NASCAR Xfinity Series, NASCAR Craftsman Truck Series and the IndyCar series. Known as "America's premier short track", it formerly hosted two USAC sprint car races.

==== Entry list ====
- (R) denotes rookie driver.
- (i) denotes driver who is ineligible for series driver points.

#	Driver	Team	Make
1	William Sawalich	Tricon Garage	Toyota
02	Mason Massey	Young's Motorsports	Chevrolet
2	Nick Sanchez	Rev Racing	Chevrolet
5	Dean Thompson	Tricon Garage	Toyota
7	Connor Zilisch (i)	Spire Motorsports	Chevrolet
9	Grant Enfinger	CR7 Motorsports	Chevrolet
11	Corey Heim	Tricon Garage	Toyota
13	Jake Garcia	ThorSport Racing	Ford
14	Trey Hutchens	Trey Hutchens Racing	Chevrolet
15	Tanner Gray	Tricon Garage	Toyota
17	Taylor Gray	Tricon Garage	Toyota
18	Tyler Ankrum	McAnally-Hilgemann Racing	Chevrolet
19	Christian Eckes	McAnally-Hilgemann Racing	Chevrolet
20	Jerry Bohlman	Young's Motorsports	Chevrolet
21	Mason Maggio	Floridian Motorsports	Ford
22	Keith McGee	Reaume Brothers Racing	Ford
25	Ty Dillon	Rackley WAR	Chevrolet
32	Bret Holmes	Bret Holmes Racing	Chevrolet
33	Lawless Alan	Reaume Brothers Racing	Ford
38	Layne Riggs (R)	Front Row Motorsports	Ford
41	Bayley Currey	Niece Motorsports	Chevrolet
42	Matt Mills	Niece Motorsports	Chevrolet
43	Daniel Dye	McAnally-Hilgemann Racing	Chevrolet
45	Kaden Honeycutt	Niece Motorsports	Chevrolet
46	Thad Moffitt (R)	Young’s Motorsports	Chevrolet
52	Stewart Friesen	Halmar Friesen Racing	Toyota
56	Timmy Hill	Hill Motorsports	Toyota
66	Conner Jones (R)	ThorSport Racing	Ford
71	Rajah Caruth	Spire Motorsports	Chevrolet
75	Stefan Parsons	Henderson Motorsports	Chevrolet
76	Spencer Boyd	Freedom Racing Enterprises	Chevrolet
77	Chase Purdy	Spire Motorsports	Chevrolet
88	Matt Crafton	ThorSport Racing	Ford
90	Justin Carroll	TC Motorsports	Toyota
91	Connor Hall	McAnally-Hilgemann Racing	Chevrolet
98	Ty Majeski	ThorSport Racing	Ford
99	Ben Rhodes	ThorSport Racing	Ford
Official entry list

== Practice ==
The first and only practice session was held on Friday, August 10, at 2:30 PM EST and would last for 20 minutes. Ben Rhodes, driving for ThorSport Racing, would set the fastest time in the session, with a lap of 22.685, and a speed of 119.021 mph (191.546 km/h).

Pos.	#	Driver	Team	Make	Time	Speed
1	99	Ben Rhodes	ThorSport Racing	Ford	22.685	119.021
2	98	Ty Majeski	ThorSport Racing	Ford	22.819	118.322
3	13	Jake Garcia	ThorSport Racing	Ford	22.835	118.240
Full practice results

== Qualifying ==
Qualifying was held on Friday, August 10, at 3:00 PM EST. Since Richmond Raceway is a short track, the qualifying system used is a single-car, two-lap system with only one round. Drivers will be on track by themselves and will have two laps to post a qualifying time, and whoever sets the fastest time in that round will win the pole.

Christian Eckes, driving for McAnally-Hilgemann Racing, would score the pole for the race, with a lap of 22.755, and a speed of 118.655 mph (190.957 km/h).

Trey Hutchens was the only driver who failed to qualify.

=== Qualifying results ===
Pos.	#	Driver	Team	Make	Time	Speed
1	19	Christian Eckes	McAnally-Hilgemann Racing	Chevrolet	22.755	118.655
2	98	Ty Majeski	ThorSport Racing	Ford	22.875	118.033
3	9	Grant Enfinger	CR7 Motorsports	Chevrolet	22.885	117.981
4	38	Layne Riggs (R)	Front Row Motorsports	Ford	22.946	117.668
5	1	William Sawalich	Tricon Garage	Toyota	23.010	117.340
6	11	Corey Heim	Tricon Garage	Toyota	23.022	117.279
7	17	Taylor Gray	Tricon Garage	Toyota	23.027	117.254
8	45	Kaden Honeycutt	Niece Motorsports	Chevrolet	23.043	117.172
9	2	Nick Sanchez	Rev Racing	Chevrolet	23.074	117.015
10	18	Tyler Ankrum	McAnally-Hilgemann Racing	Chevrolet	23.096	116.903
11	99	Ben Rhodes	ThorSport Racing	Ford	23.125	116.757
12	52	Stewart Friesen	Halmar Friesen Racing	Toyota	23.134	116.711
13	43	Daniel Dye	McAnally-Hilgemann Racing	Chevrolet	23.146	116.651
14	5	Dean Thompson	Tricon Garage	Toyota	23.166	116.550
15	41	Bayley Currey	Niece Motorsports	Chevrolet	23.185	116.455
16	71	Rajah Caruth	Spire Motorsports	Chevrolet	23.193	116.414
17	88	Matt Crafton	ThorSport Racing	Ford	23.198	116.389
18	42	Matt Mills	Niece Motorsports	Chevrolet	23.204	116.359
19	25	Ty Dillon	Rackley WAR	Chevrolet	23.227	116.244
20	77	Chase Purdy	Spire Motorsports	Chevrolet	23.231	116.224
21	91	Connor Hall	McAnally-Hilgemann Racing	Chevrolet	23.367	115.548
22	32	Bret Holmes	Bret Holmes Racing	Chevrolet	23.411	115.330
23	13	Jake Garcia	ThorSport Racing	Ford	23.447	115.153
24	56	Timmy Hill	Hill Motorsports	Toyota	23.461	115.085
25	33	Lawless Alan	Reaume Brothers Racing	Ford	23.508	114.855
26	15	Tanner Gray	Tricon Garage	Toyota	23.543	114.684
27	7	Connor Zilisch (i)	Spire Motorsports	Chevrolet	23.549	114.655
28	66	Conner Jones (R)	ThorSport Racing	Ford	23.660	114.117
29	75	Stefan Parsons	Henderson Motorsports	Chevrolet	23.721	113.823
30	46	Thad Moffitt (R)	Young's Motorsports	Chevrolet	23.747	113.699
31	02	Mason Massey	Young's Motorsports	Chevrolet	23.829	113.307
Qualified by owner's points
32	76	Spencer Boyd	Freedom Racing Enterprises	Chevrolet	23.877	113.080
33	21	Mason Maggio	Floridian Motorsports	Ford	24.118	111.950
34	90	Justin Carroll	TC Motorsports	Toyota	24.249	111.345
35	22	Keith McGee	Reaume Brothers Racing	Ford	24.437	110.488
36	20	Jerry Bohlman	Young's Motorsports	Chevrolet	25.063	107.729
Failed to qualify
37	14	Trey Hutchens	Trey Hutchens Racing	Chevrolet	24.458	110.393
Official qualifying results
Official starting lineup

== Race results ==
Stage 1 Laps: 70

Pos.	#	Driver	Team	Make	Pts
1	19	Christian Eckes	McAnally-Hilgemann Racing	Chevrolet	10
2	17	Taylor Gray	Tricon Garage	Toyota	9
3	9	Grant Enfinger	CR7 Motorsports	Chevrolet	8
4	99	Ben Rhodes	ThorSport Racing	Ford	7
5	38	Layne Riggs (R)	Front Row Motorsports	Ford	6
6	43	Daniel Dye	McAnally-Hilgemann Racing	Chevrolet	5
7	88	Matt Crafton	ThorSport Racing	Ford	4
8	11	Corey Heim	Tricon Garage	Toyota	3
9	2	Nick Sanchez	Rev Racing	Chevrolet	2
10	71	Rajah Caruth	Spire Motorsports	Chevrolet	1

Stage 2 Laps: 70

Pos.	#	Driver	Team	Make	Pts
1	9	Grant Enfinger	CR7 Motorsports	Chevrolet	10
2	19	Christian Eckes	McAnally-Hilgemann Racing	Chevrolet	9
3	43	Daniel Dye	McAnally-Hilgemann Racing	Chevrolet	8
4	38	Layne Riggs (R)	Front Row Motorsports	Ford	7
5	11	Corey Heim	Tricon Garage	Toyota	6
6	99	Ben Rhodes	ThorSport Racing	Ford	5
7	71	Rajah Caruth	Spire Motorsports	Chevrolet	4
8	18	Tyler Ankrum	McAnally-Hilgemann Racing	Chevrolet	3
9	17	Taylor Gray	Tricon Garage	Toyota	2
10	66	Conner Jones (R)	ThorSport Racing	Ford	1

Stage 3 Laps: 110

Fin	St	#	Driver	Team	Make	Laps	Led	Status	Pts
1	2	98	Ty Majeski	ThorSport Racing	Ford	250	70	Running	40
2	1	19	Christian Eckes	McAnally-Hilgemann Racing	Chevrolet	250	64	Running	54
3	7	17	Taylor Gray	Tricon Garage	Toyota	250	5	Running	45
4	3	9	Grant Enfinger	CR7 Motorsports	Chevrolet	250	98	Running	51
5	4	38	Layne Riggs (R)	Front Row Motorsports	Ford	250	0	Running	45
6	10	18	Tyler Ankrum	McAnally-Hilgemann Racing	Chevrolet	250	0	Running	34
7	11	99	Ben Rhodes	ThorSport Racing	Ford	250	0	Running	42
8	13	43	Daniel Dye	McAnally-Hilgemann Racing	Chevrolet	250	0	Running	42
9	19	25	Ty Dillon	Rackley WAR	Chevrolet	250	4	Running	28
10	21	91	Connor Hall	McAnally-Hilgemann Racing	Chevrolet	250	0	Running	27
11	29	75	Stefan Parsons	Henderson Motorsports	Chevrolet	250	0	Running	26
12	26	15	Tanner Gray	Tricon Garage	Toyota	250	0	Running	25
13	23	13	Jake Garcia	ThorSport Racing	Ford	250	0	Running	24
14	8	45	Kaden Honeycutt	Niece Motorsports	Chevrolet	250	0	Running	23
15	17	88	Matt Crafton	ThorSport Racing	Ford	250	0	Running	26
16	6	11	Corey Heim	Tricon Garage	Toyota	250	6	Running	30
17	16	71	Rajah Caruth	Spire Motorsports	Chevrolet	250	0	Running	25
18	25	33	Lawless Alan	Reaume Brothers Racing	Ford	250	0	Running	19
19	24	56	Timmy Hill	Hill Motorsports	Toyota	250	0	Running	18
20	20	77	Chase Purdy	Spire Motorsports	Chevrolet	250	0	Running	17
21	22	32	Bret Holmes	Bret Holmes Racing	Chevrolet	250	0	Running	16
22	5	1	William Sawalich	Tricon Garage	Toyota	249	3	Running	15
23	15	41	Bayley Currey	Niece Motorsports	Chevrolet	249	0	Running	14
24	32	76	Spencer Boyd	Freedom Enterprises Racing	Chevrolet	249	0	Running	13
25	12	52	Stewart Friesen	Halmer Friesen Racing	Toyota	248	0	Running	12
26	31	02	Mason Massey	Young's Motorsports	Chevrolet	247	0	Running	11
27	34	90	Justin Carroll	TC Motorsports	Toyota	247	0	Running	10
28	33	21	Mason Maggio	Floridian Motorsports	Ford	246	0	Running	9
29	27	7	Connor Zilisch (i)	Spire Motorsports	Chevrolet	236	0	Accident	0
30	9	2	Nick Sanchez	Rev Racing	Chevrolet	227	0	Accident	9
31	28	66	Conner Jones (R)	ThorSport Racing	Ford	180	0	Accident	7
32	14	5	Dean Thompson	Tricon Garage	Toyota	155	0	Accident	5
33	30	46	Thad Moffitt (R)	Young's Motorsports	Chevrolet	148	0	Accident	4
34	35	22	Keith McGee	Reaume Brothers Racing	Ford	147	0	Accident	3
35	18	42	Matt Mills	Niece Motorsports	Chevrolet	55	0	Accident	2
36	36	20	Jerry Bohlman	Young's Motorsports	Chevrolet	17	0	Slow	1

== Standings after the race ==
Drivers' Championship standings

	Pos	Driver	Points
1	1	Corey Heim	2041
1	2	Christian Eckes	2038 (-3)
	3	Ty Majeski	2023 (–18)
	4	Nick Sanchez	2018 (–23)
	5	Rajah Caruth	2009 (–32)
1	6	Grant Enfinger	2007 (–34)
1	7	Tyler Ankrum	2007 (–34)
	8	Taylor Gray	2003 (–38)
	9	Ben Rhodes	2002 (–39)
1	10	Daniel Dye	2001 (–40)
[ Official driver's standings]

Manufacturers' Championship standings

Pos	Manufacturer	Points
1	Chevrolet	603
2	Toyota	560 (-43)
3	Ford	522 (–81)

- Note: Only the first 10 positions are included for the driver standings.

Previous race: 2024 TSport 200	NASCAR Craftsman Truck Series; 2024 season	Next race: 2024 LiUNA! 175
