= 2024 TSport 200 =

15th race of the 2024 NASCAR Craftsman Truck Series

Race details
- Race 15 of 23 of the 2024 NASCAR Craftsman Truck Series
- Date: July 19, 2024
- Official name: 3rd Annual TSport 200
- Location: Lucas Oil Indianapolis Raceway Park in Brownsburg, Indiana
- Course: Permanent racing facility
- Course length: 0.686 miles (1.104 km)
- Distance: 200 laps, 137 mi (220 km)
- Scheduled distance: 200 laps, 137 mi (220 km)
- Average speed: 82.238 mph (132.349 km/h)

Pole position
Driver	Rajah Caruth	Spire Motorsports
- Time: 22.863

Most laps led
Driver	Christian Eckes	McAnally-Hilgemann Racing
- Laps: 73

Winner
No. 98	Ty Majeski	ThorSport Racing

Television in the United States
- Network: FS1
- Announcers: Adam Alexander, Phil Parsons, and Michael Waltrip

Radio in the United States
- Radio: MRN

The 2024 TSport 200 was the 15th stock car race of the 2024 NASCAR Craftsman Truck Series, and the 3rd iteration of the event. The race will be held on Friday, July 19, 2024, in Brownsburg, Indiana at Lucas Oil Indianapolis Raceway Park, a 0.686 miles (1.104 km) permanent quad-oval shaped racetrack. The race took the scheduled 200 laps to complete. Ty Majeski, driving for ThorSport Racing, would overcome from an early race penalty, and took the lead from Christian Eckes late in the race to earn his fourth career NASCAR Craftsman Truck Series win, his second consecutive win at IRP, and his first of the season. This was also the first win for Ford in the Truck Series in 2024. Eckes led a race-high 73 laps, before getting passed by Majeski and finishing 2nd. To fill out the podium, Grant Enfinger, driving for CR7 Motorsports, would finish in 3rd, respectively.

== Report ==
Lucas Oil Indianapolis Raceway Park (formerly Indianapolis Raceway Park, O'Reilly Raceway Park at Indianapolis, and Lucas Oil Raceway) is an auto racing facility in Brownsburg, Indiana, about 10 miles (16 km) northwest of downtown Indianapolis. It includes a 0.686-mile (1.104 km) oval track, a 2.5-mile (4.0 km) road course (which has fallen into disrepair and is no longer used), and a 4,400-foot (1,300 m) drag strip which is among the premier drag racing venues in the world. The complex receives about 500,000 visitors annually.

=== Entry list ===
- (R) denotes rookie driver.
- (i) denotes driver who is ineligible for series driver points.

#	Driver	Team	Make
1	William Sawalich	Tricon Garage	Toyota
02	Mason Massey	Young's Motorsports	Chevrolet
2	Nick Sanchez	Rev Racing	Chevrolet
04	Marco Andretti	Roper Racing	Chevrolet
5	Dean Thompson	Tricon Garage	Toyota
7	Sammy Smith (i)	Spire Motorsports	Chevrolet
9	Grant Enfinger	CR7 Motorsports	Chevrolet
11	Corey Heim	Tricon Garage	Toyota
13	Jake Garcia	ThorSport Racing	Ford
15	Tanner Gray	Tricon Garage	Toyota
16	Johnny Sauter	Hattori Racing Enterprises	Toyota
17	Taylor Gray	Tricon Garage	Toyota
18	Tyler Ankrum	McAnally-Hilgemann Racing	Chevrolet
19	Christian Eckes	McAnally-Hilgemann Racing	Chevrolet
22	Tyler Tomassi	Reaume Brothers Racing	Ford
25	Ty Dillon	Rackley WAR	Chevrolet
32	Bret Holmes	Bret Holmes Racing	Chevrolet
33	Lawless Alan	Reaume Brothers Racing	Ford
38	Layne Riggs (R)	Front Row Motorsports	Ford
41	Bayley Currey	Niece Motorsports	Chevrolet
42	Matt Mills	Niece Motorsports	Chevrolet
43	Daniel Dye	McAnally-Hilgemann Racing	Chevrolet
44	Conor Daly (i)	Niece Motorsports	Chevrolet
45	Ross Chastain (i)	Niece Motorsports	Chevrolet
46	Thad Moffitt (R)	Young's Motorsports	Chevrolet
52	Stewart Friesen	Halmar Friesen Racing	Toyota
56	Timmy Hill	Hill Motorsports	Toyota
66	Luke Fenhaus	ThorSport Racing	Ford
71	Rajah Caruth	Spire Motorsports	Chevrolet
76	Spencer Boyd	Freedom Racing Enterprises	Chevrolet
77	Chase Purdy	Spire Motorsports	Chevrolet
88	Matt Crafton	ThorSport Racing	Ford
91	Jack Wood (i)	McAnally-Hilgemann Racing	Chevrolet
98	Ty Majeski	ThorSport Racing	Ford
99	Ben Rhodes	ThorSport Racing	Ford
Official entry list

== Practice ==
For practice, drivers would be separated into two groups, Group A and B. Both sessions would be 15 minutes long, and was held on Friday, July 19, at 3:30 PM EST. Ty Majeski, driving for ThorSport Racing, would set the fastest time between both groups, with a lap of 23.257, and a speed of 106.187 mph (170.891 km/h).

Pos.	#	Driver	Team	Make	Time	Speed
1	98	Ty Majeski	ThorSport Racing	Ford	23.257	106.187
2	38	Layne Riggs (R)	Front Row Motorsports	Ford	23.512	105.036
3	66	Luke Fenhaus	ThorSport Racing	Ford	23.553	104.853
Full practice results

== Qualifying ==
Qualifying was held on Friday, July 19, at 4:05 PM EST. Since Lucas Oil Indianapolis Raceway Park is a short track, the qualifying system used is a single-car, two-lap system with only one round. Drivers will be on track by themselves and will have two laps to post a qualifying time, and whoever sets the fastest time will win the pole.

Rajah Caruth, driving for Spire Motorsports, would score the pole for the race, with a lap of 22.863, and a speed of 108.017 mph (173.837 km/h).

No drivers would fail to qualify.

Pos.	#	Driver	Team	Make	Time	Speed
1	71	Rajah Caruth	Spire Motorsports	Chevrolet	22.863	108.017
2	9	Grant Enfinger	CR7 Motorsports	Chevrolet	22.880	107.937
3	18	Tyler Ankrum	McAnally-Hilgemann Racing	Chevrolet	22.912	107.786
4	98	Ty Majeski	ThorSport Racing	Ford	22.924	107.730
5	88	Matt Crafton	ThorSport Racing	Ford	23.013	107.313
6	19	Christian Eckes	McAnally-Hilgemann Racing	Chevrolet	23.016	107.299
7	43	Daniel Dye	McAnally-Hilgemann Racing	Chevrolet	23.043	107.174
8	52	Stewart Friesen	Halmar Friesen Racing	Toyota	23.054	107.122
9	11	Corey Heim	Tricon Garage	Toyota	23.069	107.053
10	77	Chase Purdy	Spire Motorsports	Chevrolet	23.078	107.011
11	2	Nick Sanchez	Rev Racing	Chevrolet	23.096	106.928
12	7	Sammy Smith (i)	Spire Motorsports	Chevrolet	23.119	106.821
13	17	Taylor Gray	Tricon Garage	Toyota	23.131	106.766
14	66	Luke Fenhaus	ThorSport Racing	Ford	23.169	106.591
15	99	Ben Rhodes	ThorSport Racing	Ford	23.174	106.586
16	45	Ross Chastain (i)	Niece Motorsports	Chevrolet	23.181	106.536
17	38	Layne Riggs (R)	Front Row Motorsports	Ford	23.195	106.471
18	13	Jake Garcia	ThorSport Racing	Ford	23.258	106.183
19	5	Dean Thompson	Tricon Garage	Toyota	23.261	106.169
20	25	Ty Dillon	Rackley WAR	Chevrolet	23.266	106.146
21	15	Tanner Gray	Tricon Garage	Toyota	23.283	106.069
22	41	Bayley Currey	Niece Motorsports	Chevrolet	23.292	106.028
23	91	Jack Wood (i)	McAnally-Hilgemann Racing	Chevrolet	23.358	105.728
24	33	Lawless Alan	Reaume Brothers Racing	Ford	23.375	105.651
25	56	Timmy Hill	Hill Motorsports	Toyota	23.462	105.260
26	1	William Sawalich	Tricon Garage	Toyota	23.487	105.148
27	02	Mason Massey	Young's Motorsports	Chevrolet	23.555	104.844
28	16	Johnny Sauter	Hattori Racing Enterprises	Toyota	23.559	104.826
29	04	Marco Andretti	Roper Racing	Chevrolet	23.593	104.675
30	32	Bret Holmes	Bret Holmes Racing	Chevrolet	23.670	104.335
31	22	Tyler Tomassi	Reaume Brothers Racing	Ford	23.770	103.896
Qualified by owner's points
32	76	Spencer Boyd	Freedom Racing Enterprises	Chevrolet	23.810	103.721
33	46	Thad Moffitt (R)	Young's Motorsports	Chevrolet	24.292	101.663
34	42	Matt Mills	Niece Motorsports	Chevrolet	—	—
35	44	Conor Daly (i)	Niece Motorsports	Chevrolet	—	—
Official qualifying results

== Race results ==
Stage 1 Laps: 60

Pos.	#	Driver	Team	Make	Pts
1	19	Christian Eckes	McAnally-Hilgemann Racing	Chevrolet	10
2	9	Grant Enfinger	CR7 Motorsports	Chevrolet	9
3	11	Corey Heim	Tricon Garage	Toyota	8
4	18	Tyler Ankrum	McAnally-Hilgemann Racing	Chevrolet	7
5	71	Rajah Caruth	Spire Motorsports	Chevrolet	6
6	45	Ross Chastain (i)	Niece Motorsports	Chevrolet	0
7	2	Nick Sanchez	Rev Racing	Chevrolet	4
8	5	Dean Thompson	Tricon Garage	Toyota	3
9	7	Sammy Smith (i)	Spire Motorsports	Chevrolet	0
10	43	Daniel Dye	McAnally-Hilgemann Racing	Chevrolet	1

Stage 2 Laps: 60

Pos.	#	Driver	Team	Make	Pts
1	19	Christian Eckes	McAnally-Hilgemann Racing	Chevrolet	10
2	11	Corey Heim	Tricon Garage	Toyota	9
3	98	Ty Majeski	ThorSport Racing	Ford	8
4	88	Matt Crafton	ThorSport Racing	Ford	7
5	18	Tyler Ankrum	McAnally-Hilgemann Racing	Chevrolet	6
6	45	Ross Chastain (i)	Niece Motorsports	Chevrolet	0
7	38	Layne Riggs (R)	Front Row Motorsports	Ford	4
8	5	Dean Thompson	Tricon Garage	Toyota	3
9	71	Rajah Caruth	Spire Motorsports	Chevrolet	2
10	2	Nick Sanchez	Rev Racing	Chevrolet	1

Stage 3 Laps: 80

Pos.	St	#	Driver	Team	Make	Laps	Led	Status	Pts
1	4	98	Ty Majeski	ThorSport Racing	Ford	200	56	Running	48
2	6	19	Christian Eckes	McAnally-Hilgemann Racing	Chevrolet	200	73	Running	55
3	2	9	Grant Enfinger	CR7 Motorsports	Chevrolet	200	71	Running	43
4	3	18	Tyler Ankrum	McAnally-Hilgemann Racing	Chevrolet	200	0	Running	46
5	17	38	Layne Riggs (R)	Front Row Motorsports	Ford	200	0	Running	36
6	12	7	Sammy Smith (i)	Spire Motorsports	Chevrolet	200	0	Running	0
7	14	66	Luke Fenhaus	ThorSport Racing	Ford	200	0	Running	30
8	1	71	Rajah Caruth	Spire Motorsports	Chevrolet	200	0	Running	37
9	19	5	Dean Thompson	Tricon Garage	Toyota	200	0	Running	34
10	11	2	Nick Sanchez	Rev Racing	Chevrolet	200	0	Running	32
11	16	45	Ross Chastain (i)	Niece Motorsports	Chevrolet	200	0	Running	0
12	26	1	William Sawalich	Tricon Garage	Toyota	200	0	Running	25
13	10	77	Chase Purdy	Spire Motorsports	Chevrolet	200	0	Running	24
14	22	41	Bayley Currey	Niece Motorsports	Chevrolet	199	0	Running	23
15	23	91	Jack Wood	McAnally-Hilgemann Racing	Chevrolet	199	0	Running	22
16	13	17	Taylor Gray	Tricon Garage	Toyota	199	0	Running	21
17	9	11	Corey Heim	Tricon Garage	Toyota	199	0	Running	37
18	20	25	Ty Dillon	Rackley WAR	Chevrolet	199	0	Running	19
19	25	56	Timmy Hill	Hill Motorsports	Toyota	199	0	Running	18
20	21	15	Tanner Gray	Tricon Garage	Toyota	199	0	Running	17
21	15	99	Ben Rhodes	ThorSport Racing	Ford	199	0	Running	16
22	34	42	Matt Mills	Niece Motorsports	Chevrolet	199	0	Running	15
23	28	16	Johnny Sauter	Hattori Racing Enterprises	Toyota	199	0	Running	14
24	5	88	Matt Crafton	ThorSport Racing	Ford	199	0	Running	20
25	29	04	Marco Andretti	Roper Racing	Chevrolet	199	0	Running	12
26	30	32	Bret Holmes	Bret Holmes Racing	Chevrolet	199	0	Running	11
27	7	43	Daniel Dye	McAnally-Hilgemann Racing	Chevrolet	198	0	Running	11
28	24	33	Lawless Alan	Reaume Brothers Racing	Ford	198	0	Running	9
29	35	44	Conor Daly (i)	Niece Motorsports	Chevrolet	197	0	Running	0
30	18	13	Jake Garcia	ThorSport Racing	Ford	197	0	Running	7
31	31	22	Tyler Tomassi	Reaume Brothers Racing	Ford	197	0	Running	6
32	33	46	Thad Moffitt (R)	Young's Motorsports	Chevrolet	195	0	Running	5
33	8	52	Stewart Friesen	Halmar Friesen Racing	Toyota	194	0	Running	4
34	32	76	Spencer Boyd	Freedom Racing Enterprises	Chevrolet	164	0	Running	3
35	27	02	Mason Massey	Young's Motorsports	Chevrolet	44	0	Accident	2
Official race results

== Standings after the race ==
Drivers' Championship standings

	Pos	Driver	Points
	1	Christian Eckes	673
	2	Corey Heim	623 (-50)
1	3	Ty Majeski	538 (–135)
1	4	Nick Sanchez	537 (–136)
	5	Rajah Caruth	467 (–206)
	6	Tyler Ankrum	460 (–213)
	7	Grant Enfinger	454 (–219)
	8	Taylor Gray	425 (–248)
	9	Ben Rhodes	399 (–274)
1	10	Tanner Gray	382 (–291)
Official driver's standings

Manufacturers' Championship standings

Pos	Manufacturer	Points
1	Chevrolet	568
2	Toyota	526 (-42)
3	Ford	482 (–86)

- Note: Only the first 10 positions are included for the driver standings.

Previous race: 2024 CRC Brakleen 175	NASCAR Craftsman Truck Series; 2024 season	Next race: 2024 Clean Harbors 250
