= Boston Oliver =

American racing driver (born 2007)

- Born: June 27, 2007 (age 19); Murfreesboro, Tennessee, U.S.

NASCAR FedEx Freight Truck Series career
- 1 race run over 1 year
- 2025 position: 73rd
- Best finish: 73rd (2025)
- First race: 2025 TSport 200 (IRP)
Wins	Top tens	Poles
0	0	0
- Statistics up to date as of November 1, 2025.

Boston Oliver (born June 27, 2007) is an American professional stock car racing driver. He last competed part-time in the NASCAR Craftsman Truck Series, driving the No. 74 Toyota Tundra TRD Pro for Mike Harmon Racing.

== Racing career ==
Oliver has previously competed in series such as the CRA JEGS All star Tour, the CRA JEGS All-Stars Tour, the Thursday Thunder Legends Racing Series at Atlanta Motor Speedway, the Southeast Legends Tour, and the Show Me The Money Pro Late Model Series.

In 2025, it was revealed that Oliver would make his debut in the NASCAR Craftsman Truck Series at Lucas Oil Indianapolis Raceway Park, driving the No. 74 Toyota for Mike Harmon Racing. He started in 34th after qualifying was cancelled due to rain, and finished in 33rd due to handling issues.

== Motorsports career results ==
=== NASCAR ===
(key) (Bold – Pole position awarded by qualifying time. Italics – Pole position earned by points standings or practice time. * – Most laps led.)

==== Craftsman Truck Series ====
NASCAR Craftsman Truck Series results
Year	Team	No.	Make	1	2	3	4	5	6	7	8	9	10	11	12	13	14	15	16	17	18	19	20	21	22	23	24	25	NCTC	Pts	Ref
2025	Mike Harmon Racing	74	Toyota	DAY	ATL	LVS	HOM	MAR	BRI	CAR	TEX	KAN	NWS	CLT	NSH	MCH	POC	LRP	IRP; 33	GLN	RCH	DAR	BRI	NHA	ROV	TAL	MAR	PHO	73rd	4	

^{*} Season still in progress
^{1} Ineligible for series points
