= Gian Buffomante =

American racing driver

- Born: March 27, 2008 (age 18); Naperville, Illinois, U.S.

NASCAR FedEx Freight Truck Series career
- 1 race run over 1 year
- 2025 position: 63rd
- Best finish: 63rd (2025)
- First race: 2025 Mission 176 at The Glen (Watkins Glen)
Wins	Top tens	Poles
0	0	0
- Statistics up to date as of November 1, 2025.

Gian Buffomante (born March 27, 2008) is an American professional auto racing driver. He last competed part-time in the NASCAR Craftsman Truck Series, driving the No. 22 Ford F-150 for Reaume Brothers Racing, and full-time in the Trans Am Series, driving for Nitro Motorsports. He is the son of Tony Buffomante, who is a former champion of the Trans Am Series TA2 class, having won it in 2016, and the Star Mazda Championship, having won it in 1997.

== Racing career ==
Buffomante started his racing career in 2019, where he competed in regional and national karting series across the United States. He then transitioned to sports cars in 2023, where he ran in SCCA Super Tour National in the GT2 class, winning multiple pole positions, wins, and podiums, and finishing second in his class.

In 2024, Buffomante made his debut in the Trans Am Series at Virginia International Raceway, where he finished fourth in his class. It was later announced that he will drive the full season in the series, driving for Nitro Motorsports in the TA2 class.

On July 30, 2025, it was announced that Buffomante would make his debut in the NASCAR Craftsman Truck Series at Watkins Glen International, driving the No. 22 Ford for Reaume Brothers Racing.

== Motorsports career results ==
=== Stock car career summary ===
Season	Series	Team	Races	Wins	Top 5	Top 10	Points	Position
2025	NASCAR Craftsman Truck Series	Reaume Brothers Racing	1	0	0	0	12	63rd

=== NASCAR ===
(key) (Bold – Pole position awarded by qualifying time. Italics – Pole position earned by points standings or practice time. * – Most laps led.)

==== Craftsman Truck Series ====
NASCAR Craftsman Truck Series results
Year	Team	No.	Make	1	2	3	4	5	6	7	8	9	10	11	12	13	14	15	16	17	18	19	20	21	22	23	24	25	NCTC	Pts	Ref
2025	Reaume Brothers Racing	22	Ford	DAY	ATL	LVS	HOM	MAR	BRI	CAR	TEX	KAN	NWS	CLT	NSH	MCH	POC	LRP	IRP	GLN; 25	RCH	DAR	BRI	NHA	ROV	TAL	MAR	PHO	63rd	12	

^{*} Season still in progress
^{1} Ineligible for series points
