= A. J. Waller =

American racing driver (born 2003)

- Born: Alan J. Waller; November 19, 2003 (age 22); Floral City, Florida, U.S.

NASCAR FedEx Freight Truck Series career
- 3 races run over 1 year
- 2025 position: 60th
- Best finish: 60th (2025)
- First race: 2025 Boys & Girls Club of the Blue Ridge 200 (Martinsville)
- Last race: 2025 Slim Jim 200 (Martinsville)
Wins	Top tens	Poles
0	0	0
- Statistics up to date as of November 1, 2025.

Alan J. Waller (born November 19, 2003) is an American professional stock car racing driver. He last competed part-time in the NASCAR Craftsman Truck Series, driving the No. 22 Ford F-150 for Reaume Brothers Racing.

== Racing career ==
Waller first began his racing career at the age of four, where he drove in go-karts, before progressing up to stock cars at the age of fourteen. In 2019, he ran in Pure Stocks and Street Stocks, finishing eighth and third in points, respectively. The following year, he was diagnosed with stage 4 Hodgkin's lymphoma, and spent months in hospital whilst receiving chemotherapy and radiation treatments. Afterwards, Waller returned to racing in 2022, where he competed in late-model events in the Southwest United States. He has since competed in series such as the ASA Southern Super Series and the UARA National Late Model Series.

In 2025, it was revealed that Waller would participate in the pre-season test for the ARCA Menards Series at Daytona International Speedway, driving the No. 73 Ford for KLAS Motorsports. Two months later, it was revealed that Waller will attempt to make his debut in the NASCAR Craftsman Truck Series at Martinsville Speedway, driving the No. 22 Ford for Reaume Brothers Racing. Waller made the race but started to feel sick during the race and was relieved by his crew chief and team-owner, Josh Reaume. Since Waller started the race, he is officially credited with a 31st-place finish in his debut.

== Motorsports career results ==
=== Stock car career summary ===
Season	Series	Team	Races	Wins	Top 5	Top 10	Points	Position
2025	NASCAR Craftsman Truck Series	Reaume Brothers Racing	3	0	0	0	16	60th

=== NASCAR ===
(key) (Bold – Pole position awarded by qualifying time. Italics – Pole position earned by points standings or practice time. * – Most laps led.)

==== Craftsman Truck Series ====
NASCAR Craftsman Truck Series results
Year	Team	No.	Make	1	2	3	4	5	6	7	8	9	10	11	12	13	14	15	16	17	18	19	20	21	22	23	24	25	NCTC	Pts	Ref
2025	Reaume Brothers Racing	22	Ford	DAY	ATL	LVS	HOM	MAR; 31	BRI	CAR	TEX	KAN	NWS	CLT	NSH	MCH	POC	LRP	IRP; 32	GLN	RCH	DAR	BRI	NHA	ROV	TAL	MAR; 32	PHO	60th	16	

^{*} Season still in progress
^{1} Ineligible for series points
