= LiUNA (disambiguation) =

Laborers' International Union of North America is an American and Canadian labor union.

LiUNA or LiUNA! may also refer to many NASCAR races:

- The LiUNA!, a NASCAR Xfinity Series race at Las Vegas Motor Speedway.
- LiUNA! 150, a race in the NASCAR Craftsman Truck Series at Lime Rock Park.
- LiUNA! 150 (ARCA) a combination race between the ARCA Menards Series and ARCA Menards Series East that takes place at Lucas Oil Raceway Park.
- LiUNA! 175, a race in the NASCAR Craftsman Truck Series that took place at the Milwaukee Mile.
