= Landon Polinski =

American NASCAR crew chief

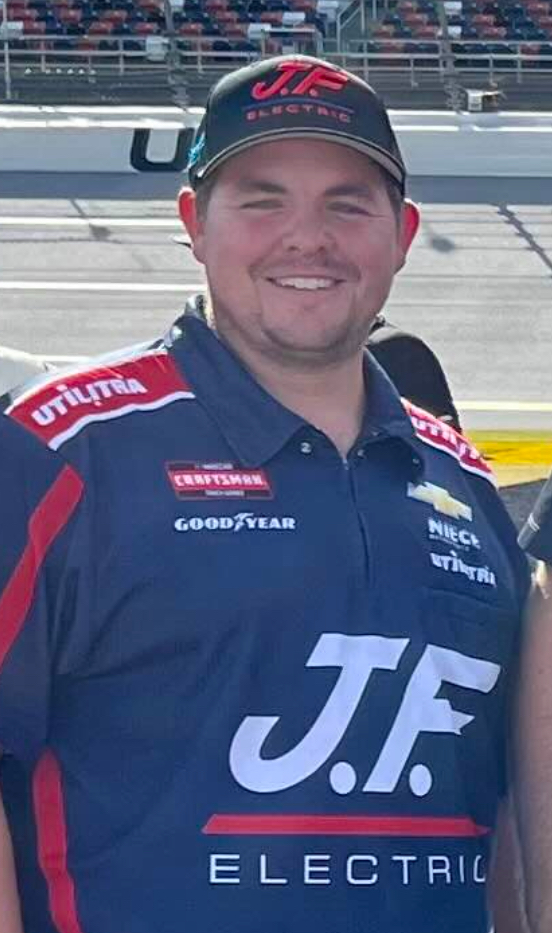
- Polinski at Talladega Superspeedway in 2025.

Personal information
- Born: March 24, 1996 (age 30) Anderson Creek, North Carolina, U.S.

Sport
- Country: United States
- Sport: NASCAR Craftsman Truck Series
- Team: No. 42 Niece Motorsports
- Updated on November 20, 2025

Landon Polinski (born March 24, 1996) is an American NASCAR crew chief. He is employed at Niece Motorsports as the crew chief for Tyler Reif and Matt Mills in the No. 42 Chevrolet Silverado RST. He has crew chiefed in NASCAR since 2025.

== Racing career ==
=== Early career ===
Polinski was a driver to start his career, racing go-karts from the age of nine, as well as Street Stock's from 2014 to 2019.

In 2010, Polinski began working as a mechanic on Shaw Racing's Dirt Late Model program, where the team would score two back-to-back track championships at Fayetteville Motor Speedway from 2012 to 2013.

=== Truck Series ===
Polinski would begin as an engineering intern at Niece Motorsports in 2019, whilst attending UNC Charlotte and would earn his degree in 2020. He would go onto serve as a primary engineer for the team between 2020 and 2025.

==== 2025; Start as a crew chief ====
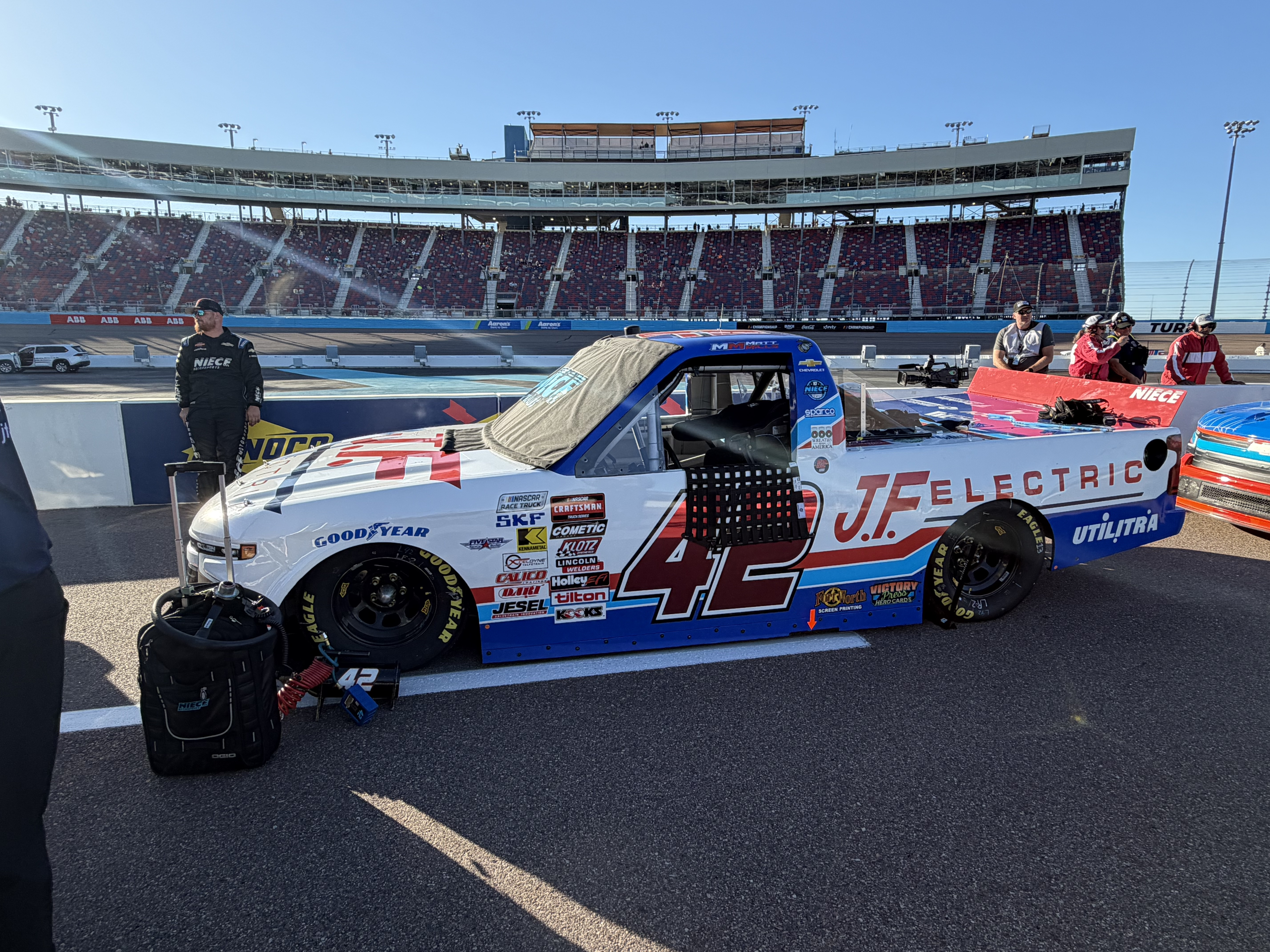
The No. 42 fielded by Niece Motorsports, which Polinski served as crew chief of in 2025.

In August 2025, Polinski would make his debut as a crew chief, serving as Matt Mills' crew chief for the final eight races of the 2025 season, starting at Darlington. The pairing would result in a best finish of 11th in the season finale at Phoenix.

== Crew chief statistics ==
=== Truck Series ===
Year	Driver	Races	Wins	Poles	Top 5	Top 10	DNFs	Position
2025	Matt Mills	8	0	0	0	0	1	17th
2026	Tyler Reif	—*	—*	—*	—*	—*	—*	—*
Totals		8	0	0	0	0	0	
