= 2025 NASCAR Craftsman Truck Series =

American motorsport season

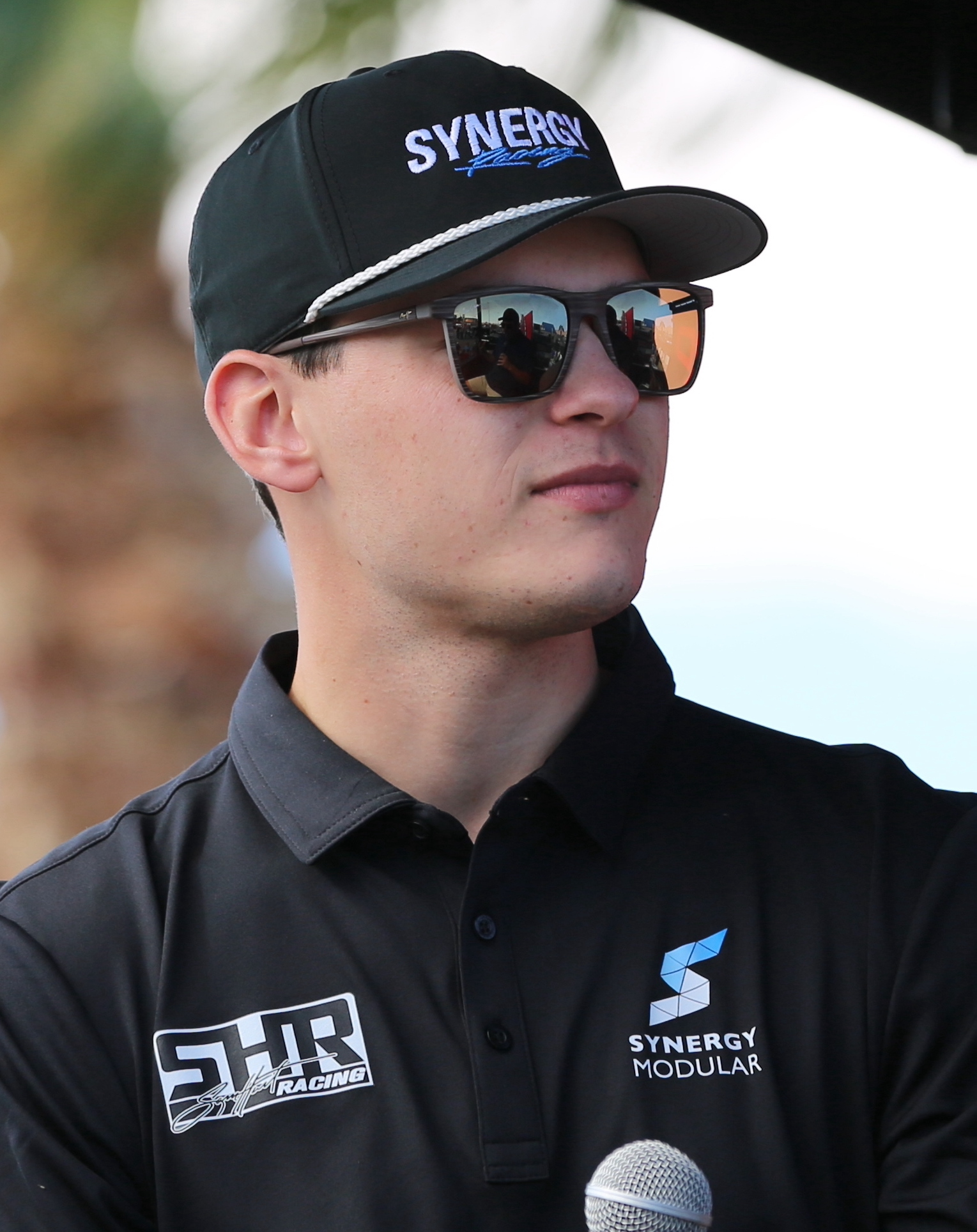
Corey Heim, the Craftsman Truck Series champion and 2025 regular season champion.

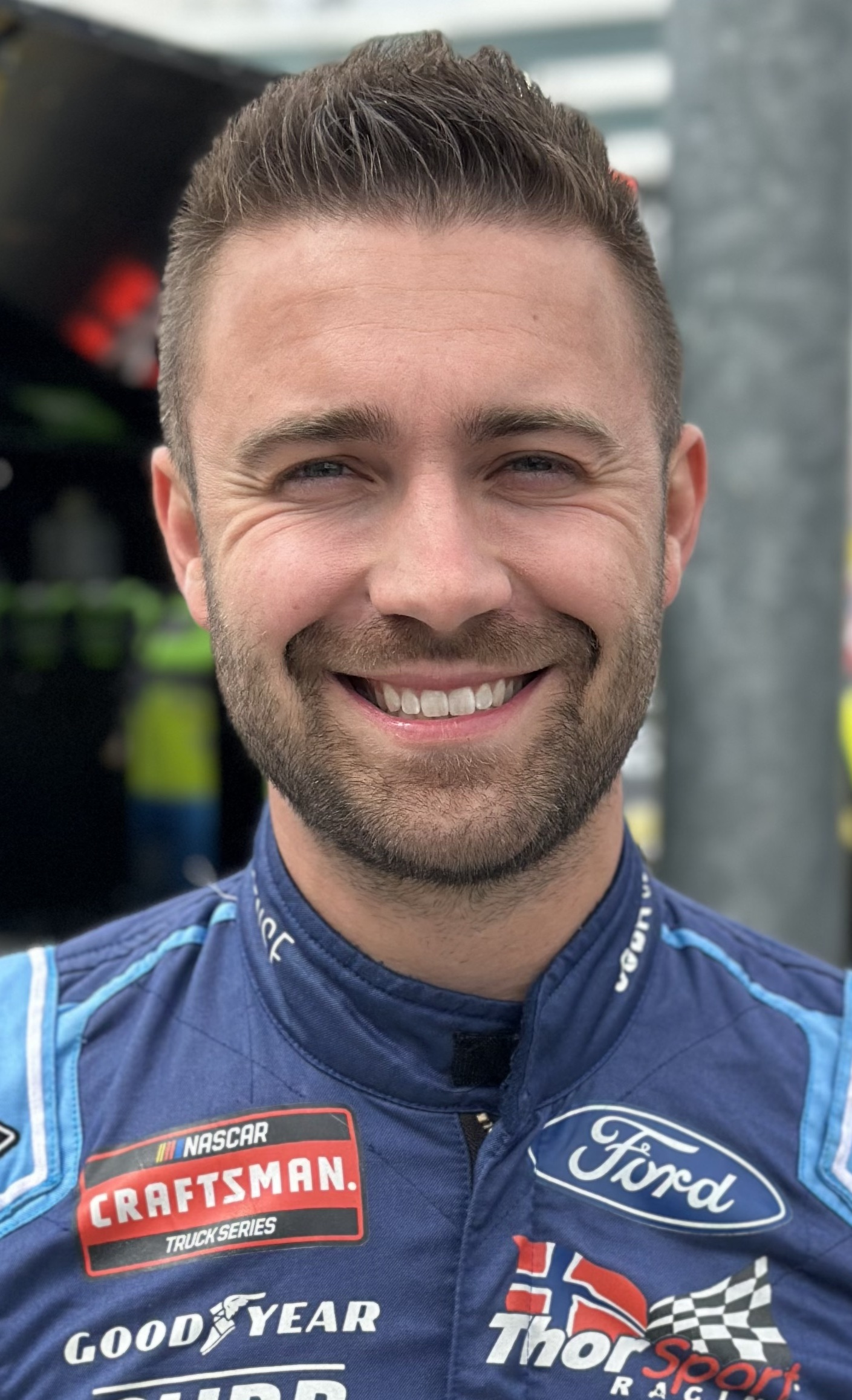
Ty Majeski, the defending champion, finished second in the standings.

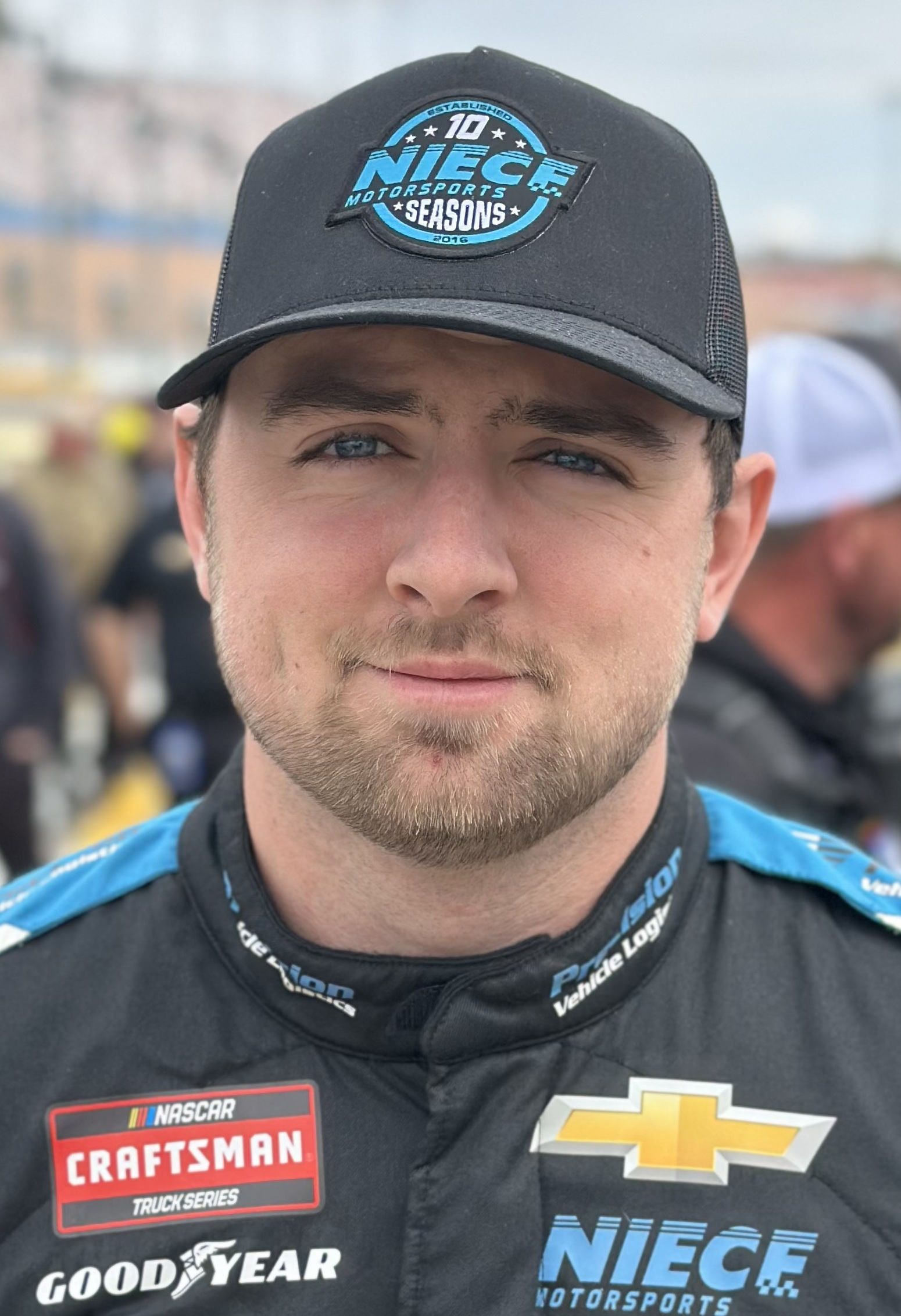
Kaden Honeycutt finished third in the standings.

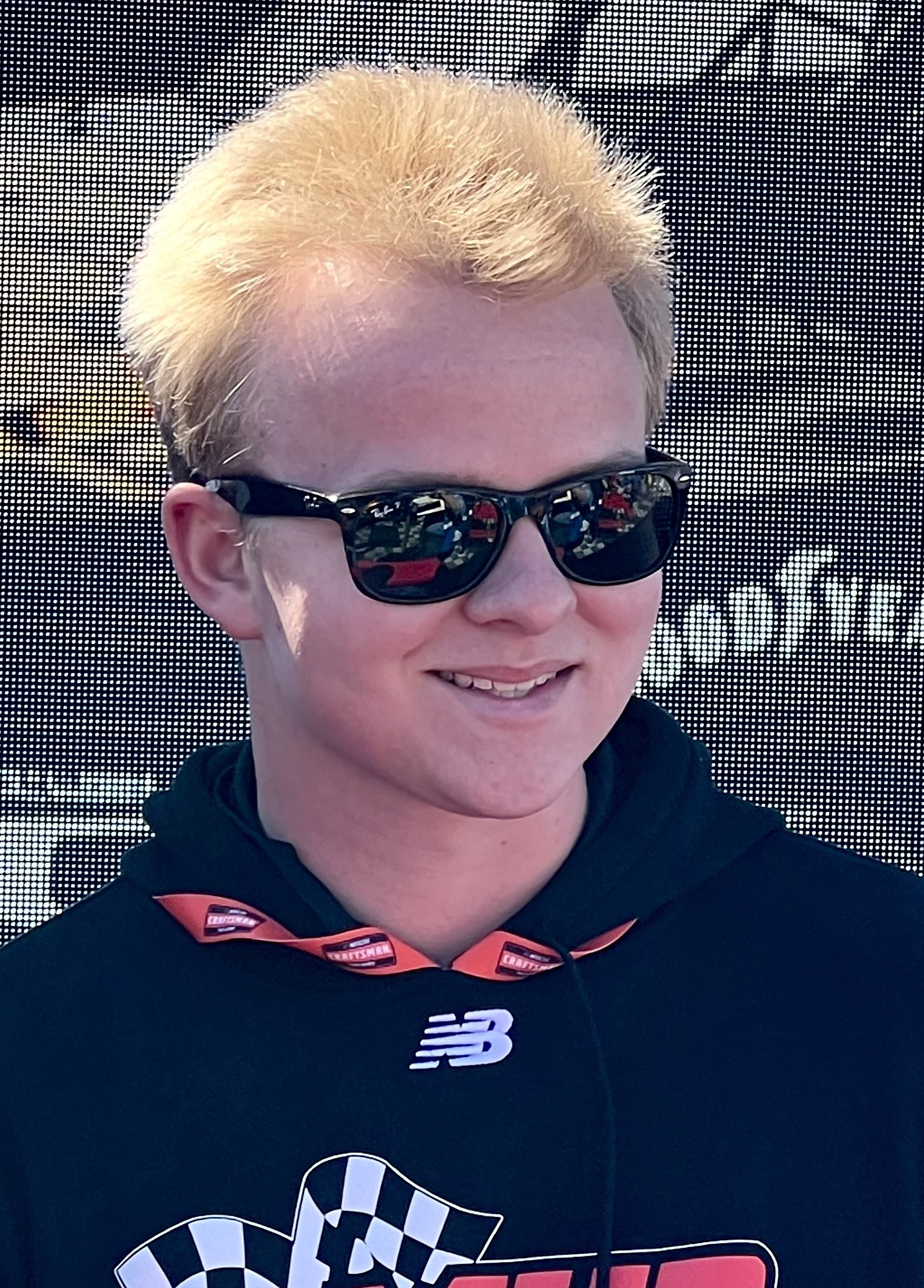
Tyler Ankrum finished fourth in the standings.

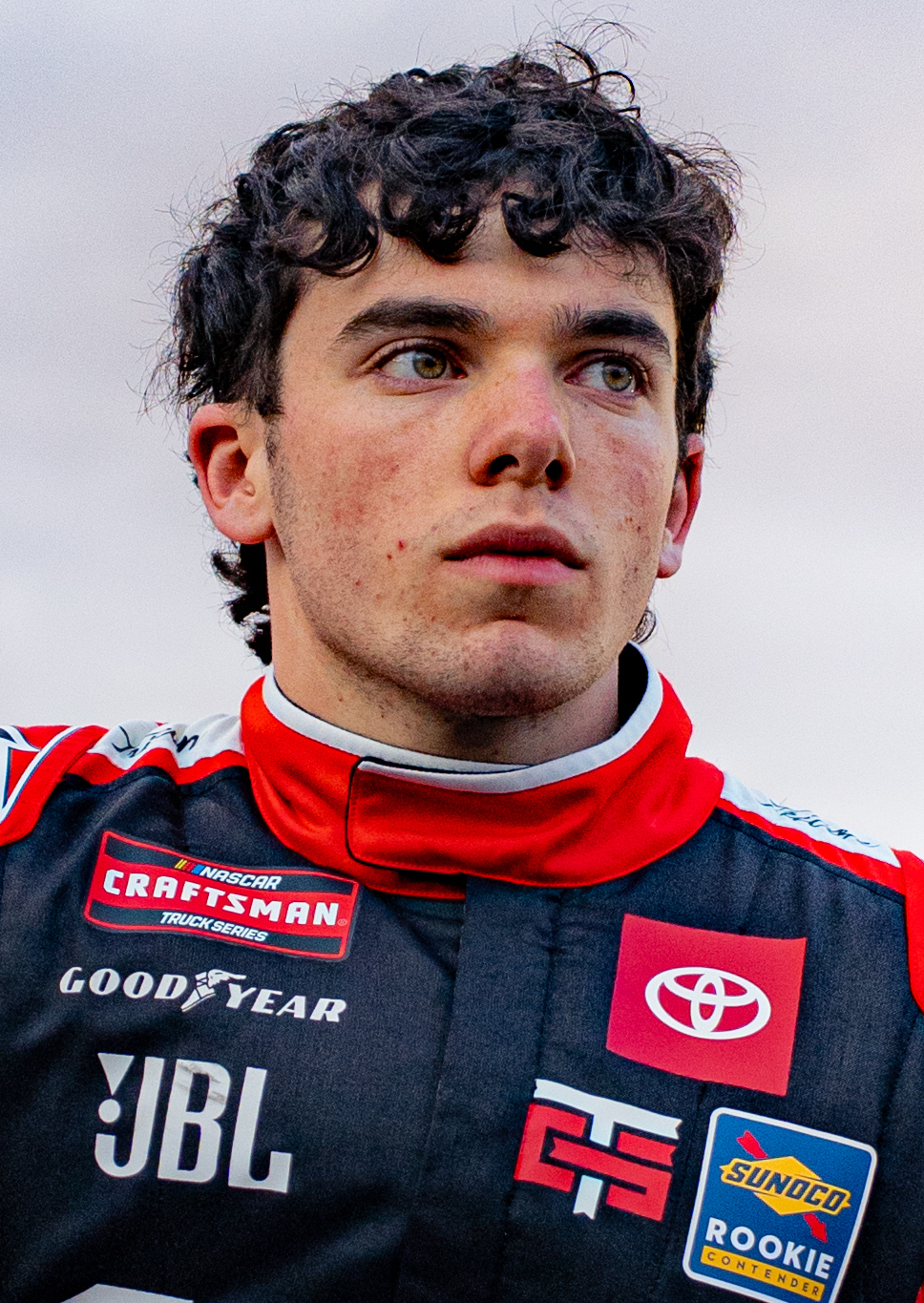
Gio Ruggiero, the 2025 NASCAR Rookie of the Year.

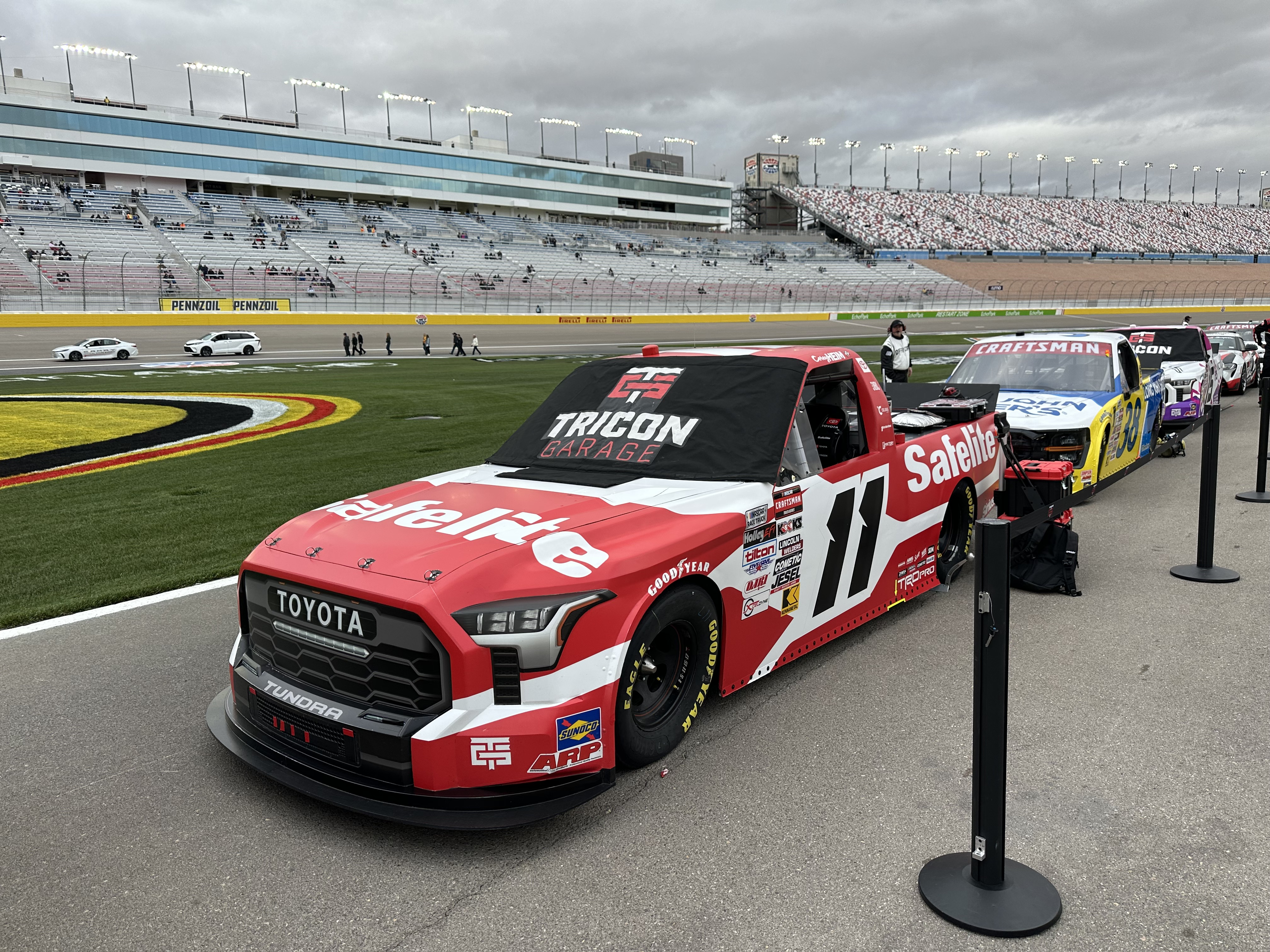
Toyota won the manufacturers' championship with 925 points and 14 wins, while the Tricon Garage No. 11 truck driven by Corey Heim won the owners' championship.

The 2025 NASCAR Craftsman Truck Series season was the 31st season of the NASCAR Craftsman Truck Series, a pickup truck racing series sanctioned by NASCAR in the United States. The season started on February 14 with the Fresh From Florida 250 at Daytona International Speedway and ended with the NASCAR Craftsman Truck Series Championship Race on October 31 at Phoenix Raceway.

Ty Majeski is the defending champion after winning the 2024 NASCAR Craftsman Truck Series title. Gio Ruggiero of Tricon Garage won NASCAR Rookie of the Year honors. Ruggiero's teammate, Corey Heim, won both the Regular Season Championship and the 2025 championship, capping off one of the most historic seasons in NASCAR history.

This season also saw the debut of a new radio network, the NASCAR Racing Network, a collaboration between Motor Racing Network (who previously broadcast the entire Truck Series schedule on the radio) and Performance Racing Network, to broadcast the entire Truck Series schedule starting at Atlanta.

This was the last year with three manufacturers, as Ram announced on June 8, 2025 that they will return to the series in 2026.

== Teams and drivers ==
=== Full-time teams ===
Manufacturer	Team	No.	Driver	Crew chief	References
Chevrolet	CR7 Motorsports	9	Grant Enfinger	Jeff Stankiewicz 20; Michael Shelton 5	
Chevrolet	Freedom Racing Enterprises	76	Spencer Boyd	Mike Hillman Jr.	
Chevrolet	McAnally–Hilgemann Racing	18	Tyler Ankrum	Mark Hillman	
Chevrolet	McAnally–Hilgemann Racing	19	Daniel Hemric	Joshua Graham 15; Kevin Bellicourt 9	
Chevrolet	McAnally–Hilgemann Racing	81	Connor Mosack (R)	Blake Bainbridge	
Chevrolet	Niece Motorsports	42	Matt Mills	Mike Shiplett 17; Landon Polinski 8	
Chevrolet	Niece Motorsports	44	Bayley Currey 8	Wally Rogers	
Chevrolet	Niece Motorsports	44	Ross Chastain 5	Wally Rogers	
Chevrolet	Niece Motorsports	44	Matt Gould 1	Wally Rogers	
Chevrolet	Niece Motorsports	44	Conner Jones 2	Wally Rogers	
Chevrolet	Niece Motorsports	44	Josh Bilicki 1	Wally Rogers	
Chevrolet	Niece Motorsports	44	Andrés Pérez de Lara (R) 8	Wally Rogers	
Chevrolet	Niece Motorsports	45	Kaden Honeycutt 16	Phil Gould	
Chevrolet	Niece Motorsports	45	Connor Zilisch 1	Phil Gould	
Chevrolet	Niece Motorsports	45	Bayley Currey 8	Phil Gould	
Chevrolet	Rackley W.A.R.	26	Dawson Sutton (R)	Chad Kendrick	
Chevrolet	Spire Motorsports	7	Justin Haley 1	Brian Pattie	
Chevrolet	Spire Motorsports	7	Kyle Busch 2	Brian Pattie	
Chevrolet	Spire Motorsports	7	Corey Day 9	Brian Pattie	
Chevrolet	Spire Motorsports	7	Carson Hocevar 4	Brian Pattie	
Chevrolet	Spire Motorsports	7	Sammy Smith 3	Brian Pattie	
Chevrolet	Spire Motorsports	7	Jordan Taylor 1	Brian Pattie	
Chevrolet	Spire Motorsports	7	Patrick Emerling 1	Brian Pattie	
Chevrolet	Spire Motorsports	7	Connor Zilisch 1	Brian Pattie	
Chevrolet	Spire Motorsports	7	J. J. Yeley 1	Brian Pattie	
Chevrolet	Spire Motorsports	7	Brenden Queen 1	Brian Pattie	
Chevrolet	Spire Motorsports	7	Stefan Parsons 1	Brian Pattie	
Chevrolet	Spire Motorsports	71	Rajah Caruth	Kevin Manion	
Chevrolet	Spire Motorsports	77	Andrés Pérez de Lara (R) 17	Chad Walter	
Chevrolet	Spire Motorsports	77	Corey LaJoie 8	Chad Walter	
Chevrolet	Young's Motorsports	02	Nathan Byrd 15	Tyler Young 12; Jason Miller 11; D. J. Powell Jr. 2	
Chevrolet	Young's Motorsports	02	Jayson Alexander 3	Tyler Young 12; Jason Miller 11; D. J. Powell Jr. 2	
Chevrolet	Young's Motorsports	02	Stefan Parsons 1	Tyler Young 12; Jason Miller 11; D. J. Powell Jr. 2	
Chevrolet	Young's Motorsports	02	Ben Maier 2	Tyler Young 12; Jason Miller 11; D. J. Powell Jr. 2	
Chevrolet	Young's Motorsports	02	Kaden Honeycutt 1	Tyler Young 12; Jason Miller 11; D. J. Powell Jr. 2	
Chevrolet	Young's Motorsports	02	Nick Leitz 1	Tyler Young 12; Jason Miller 11; D. J. Powell Jr. 2	
Chevrolet	Young's Motorsports	02	Treyten Lapcevich 1	Tyler Young 12; Jason Miller 11; D. J. Powell Jr. 2	
Chevrolet	Young's Motorsports	02	Logan Bearden 1	Tyler Young 12; Jason Miller 11; D. J. Powell Jr. 2	
Ford	Front Row Motorsports	34	Layne Riggs	Dylan Cappello 24; Jonathan Coates 1	
Ford	Front Row Motorsports	38	Chandler Smith	Jon Leonard	
Ford	Reaume Brothers Racing	2	Josh Reaume 2	Ryan London 2 Amir Alexander 10; Carl Long 1 Gregory Rayl 1 Josh Reaume 4 Will Camilleri 2 John Reaume 5	
Ford	Reaume Brothers Racing	2	Keith McGee 1	Ryan London 2 Amir Alexander 10; Carl Long 1 Gregory Rayl 1 Josh Reaume 4 Will Camilleri 2 John Reaume 5	
Ford	Reaume Brothers Racing	2	Stephen Mallozzi 6	Ryan London 2 Amir Alexander 10; Carl Long 1 Gregory Rayl 1 Josh Reaume 4 Will Camilleri 2 John Reaume 5	
Ford	Reaume Brothers Racing	2	Cody Dennison 7	Ryan London 2 Amir Alexander 10; Carl Long 1 Gregory Rayl 1 Josh Reaume 4 Will Camilleri 2 John Reaume 5	
Ford	Reaume Brothers Racing	2	Derek White 1	Ryan London 2 Amir Alexander 10; Carl Long 1 Gregory Rayl 1 Josh Reaume 4 Will Camilleri 2 John Reaume 5	
Ford	Reaume Brothers Racing	2	Clayton Green 5	Ryan London 2 Amir Alexander 10; Carl Long 1 Gregory Rayl 1 Josh Reaume 4 Will Camilleri 2 John Reaume 5	
Ford	Reaume Brothers Racing	2	Morgen Baird 1	Ryan London 2 Amir Alexander 10; Carl Long 1 Gregory Rayl 1 Josh Reaume 4 Will Camilleri 2 John Reaume 5	
Ford	Reaume Brothers Racing	2	William Lambros 2	Ryan London 2 Amir Alexander 10; Carl Long 1 Gregory Rayl 1 Josh Reaume 4 Will Camilleri 2 John Reaume 5	
Ford	Reaume Brothers Racing	2	Carter Fartuch 1	Ryan London 2 Amir Alexander 10; Carl Long 1 Gregory Rayl 1 Josh Reaume 4 Will Camilleri 2 John Reaume 5	
Ford	Reaume Brothers Racing	22	Jason White 2	John Reaume 6 Josh Reaume 8 Ryan London 7 Gregory Rayl 1 Will Camilleri 3	
Ford	Reaume Brothers Racing	22	Josh Reaume 6	John Reaume 6 Josh Reaume 8 Ryan London 7 Gregory Rayl 1 Will Camilleri 3	
Ford	Reaume Brothers Racing	22	Keith McGee 1	John Reaume 6 Josh Reaume 8 Ryan London 7 Gregory Rayl 1 Will Camilleri 3	
Ford	Reaume Brothers Racing	22	A. J. Waller 3	John Reaume 6 Josh Reaume 8 Ryan London 7 Gregory Rayl 1 Will Camilleri 3	
Ford	Reaume Brothers Racing	22	Tyler Tomassi 3	John Reaume 6 Josh Reaume 8 Ryan London 7 Gregory Rayl 1 Will Camilleri 3	
Ford	Reaume Brothers Racing	22	Cody Dennison 1	John Reaume 6 Josh Reaume 8 Ryan London 7 Gregory Rayl 1 Will Camilleri 3	
Ford	Reaume Brothers Racing	22	Morgen Baird 1	John Reaume 6 Josh Reaume 8 Ryan London 7 Gregory Rayl 1 Will Camilleri 3	
Ford	Reaume Brothers Racing	22	Mason Maggio 2	John Reaume 6 Josh Reaume 8 Ryan London 7 Gregory Rayl 1 Will Camilleri 3	
Ford	Reaume Brothers Racing	22	Clayton Green 2	John Reaume 6 Josh Reaume 8 Ryan London 7 Gregory Rayl 1 Will Camilleri 3	
Ford	Reaume Brothers Racing	22	Alex Labbé 1	John Reaume 6 Josh Reaume 8 Ryan London 7 Gregory Rayl 1 Will Camilleri 3	
Ford	Reaume Brothers Racing	22	Gian Buffomante 1	John Reaume 6 Josh Reaume 8 Ryan London 7 Gregory Rayl 1 Will Camilleri 3	
Ford	Reaume Brothers Racing	22	Stephen Mallozzi 1	John Reaume 6 Josh Reaume 8 Ryan London 7 Gregory Rayl 1 Will Camilleri 3	
Ford	Reaume Brothers Racing	22	Blake Lothian 1	John Reaume 6 Josh Reaume 8 Ryan London 7 Gregory Rayl 1 Will Camilleri 3	
Ford	Reaume Brothers Racing	33	Frankie Muniz (R) 21	Pedro Lopez	
Ford	Reaume Brothers Racing	33	Mason Maggio 3	Pedro Lopez	
Ford	Reaume Brothers Racing	33	Tyler Tomassi 1	Pedro Lopez	
Ford	ThorSport Racing	13	Jake Garcia	Jeriod Prince	
Ford	ThorSport Racing	88	Matt Crafton	Josh Hankish	
Ford	ThorSport Racing	98	Ty Majeski	Joe Shear Jr.	
Ford	ThorSport Racing	99	Ben Rhodes	Rich Lushes 21; Doug George 4	
Toyota	Halmar Friesen Racing	52	Stewart Friesen 16	Jimmy Villeneuve	
Toyota	Halmar Friesen Racing	52	Christopher Bell 1	Jimmy Villeneuve	
Toyota	Halmar Friesen Racing	52	Kaden Honeycutt 8	Jimmy Villeneuve	
Toyota	Tricon Garage	1	William Sawalich 5	Jacob Hampton	
Toyota	Tricon Garage	1	Brandon Jones 7	Jacob Hampton	
Toyota	Tricon Garage	1	Lawless Alan 2	Jacob Hampton	
Toyota	Tricon Garage	1	Brent Crews 9	Jacob Hampton	
Toyota	Tricon Garage	1	Trevor Bayne 1	Jacob Hampton	
Toyota	Tricon Garage	1	Bret Holmes 1	Jacob Hampton	
Toyota	Tricon Garage	5	Toni Breidinger (R)	Derek Smith	
Toyota	Tricon Garage	11	Corey Heim	Scott Zipadelli	
Toyota	Tricon Garage	15	Tanner Gray	Jeff Hensley	
Toyota	Tricon Garage	17	Gio Ruggiero (R)	Jerame Donley	

=== Limited schedule ===
Manufacturer	Team	No.	Driver	Crew chief	Races	References
Chevrolet	1/4 Ley Racing (Note: Entry was fielded in a collaboration with NDS Motorsports.)	32	Dale Quarterley	Shane Wilson	1	
Chevrolet	CR7 Motorsports	97	Carson Kvapil	Michael Shelton	1	
Chevrolet	FDNY Racing	28	Bryan Dauzat	Jim Rosenblum	2	
Chevrolet	Freedom Racing Enterprises	67	Michel Disdier	Jeff Hammond 3 Mike Hillman Sr. 1	1	
Chevrolet	Freedom Racing Enterprises	67	Ryan Roulette	Jeff Hammond 3 Mike Hillman Sr. 1	3	
Chevrolet	GK Racing	95	Clay Greenfield	Trip Bruce	2	
Chevrolet	Henderson Motorsports	75	Parker Kligerman	Chris Carrier	8	
Chevrolet	Henderson Motorsports	75	Patrick Emerling	Chris Carrier	1	
Chevrolet	Hettinger Racing	4	Mason Maggio	Bruce Cook	1	
Chevrolet	McAnally–Hilgemann Racing	16	Christian Eckes	Darren Fraley	2	
Chevrolet	McAnally–Hilgemann Racing	16	Kris Wright	Darren Fraley	2	
Chevrolet	McAnally–Hilgemann Racing	91	Jack Wood	Kevin Bellicourt 15; Joshua Graham 9	24	
Chevrolet	Niece Motorsports	41	Matt Gould	Mike Shiplett	1	
Chevrolet	Niece Motorsports	41	Conner Jones	Mike Shiplett	3	
Chevrolet	Niece Motorsports	41	Josh Bilicki	Mike Shiplett	1	
Chevrolet	Niece Motorsports	41	Tyler Reif	Mike Shiplett	1	
Chevrolet	Norm Benning Racing	6	Norm Benning	Rob Tate Jr. 1 Dan Killius 11	12	
Chevrolet	Spire Motorsports	07	Michael McDowell	Allen Hart	2	
Chevrolet	Spire Motorsports	07	Justin Haley	Allen Hart	1	
Chevrolet	Spire Motorsports	07	Kyle Larson	Allen Hart	2	
Chevrolet	Spire Motorsports	07	William Byron	Allen Hart	2	
Chevrolet	Spire Motorsports	07	Sammy Smith	Allen Hart	1	
Chevrolet	Spire Motorsports	07	Nick Sanchez	Allen Hart	1	
Chevrolet	Spire Motorsports	07	Kyle Busch	Allen Hart	3	
Chevrolet	Spire Motorsports	07	B. J. McLeod	Allen Hart	1	
Chevrolet	Spire Motorsports	07	Corey LaJoie	Allen Hart	1	
Chevrolet	Spire Motorsports	07	Patrick Emerling	Allen Hart	1	
Chevrolet	Spire Motorsports	07	Thomas Annunziata	Allen Hart	1	
Chevrolet	Spire Motorsports	07	Brenden Queen	Allen Hart	1	
Chevrolet	Young's Motorsports	20	Stefan Parsons	Rodney Rood 3 Tyler Young 2 Jason Miller 2	4	
Chevrolet	Young's Motorsports	20	Jordan Anderson (Note: Entry was fielded in a collaboration with Jordan Anderson Racing.)	Rodney Rood 3 Tyler Young 2 Jason Miller 2	1	
Chevrolet	Young's Motorsports	20	Mason Massey	Rodney Rood 3 Tyler Young 2 Jason Miller 2	1	
Chevrolet	Young's Motorsports	20	Will Rodgers	Rodney Rood 3 Tyler Young 2 Jason Miller 2	1	
Ford	MBM Motorsports	69	Tyler Tomassi	Carl Long	3	
Ford	MBM Motorsports	69	Derek White	Carl Long	2	
Ford	MBM Motorsports	69	Casey Mears	Carl Long	1	
Ford	ThorSport Racing	66	Johnny Sauter	Doug George 15; Rich Lushes 5	1	
Ford	ThorSport Racing	66	Luke Fenhaus (R)	Doug George 15; Rich Lushes 5	12	
Ford	ThorSport Racing	66	Luke Baldwin	Doug George 15; Rich Lushes 5	5	
Ford	ThorSport Racing	66	Cameron Waters	Doug George 15; Rich Lushes 5	1	
Ford	ThorSport Racing	66	Chris Buescher	Doug George 15; Rich Lushes 5	1	
Toyota	Akinori Performance	63	Akinori Ogata	Mike Curtis	2	
Toyota	Brent Crews Motorsports (Note: Entry was fielded in a collaboration with Nitro Motorsports.)	70	Brent Crews	Nick Tucker	1	
Toyota	Cook Racing Technologies	84	Patrick Staropoli	Bruce Cook	4	
Toyota	Greg Van Alst Motorsports	35	Greg Van Alst	Kevin Shannon	4	
Toyota	Halmar Friesen Racing	62	Wesley Slimp	Bruce Cook	3	
Toyota	Halmar Friesen Racing	62	Cole Butcher	Bruce Cook	2	
Toyota	Halmar Friesen Racing	62	Mike Christopher Jr.	Bruce Cook	1	
Toyota	Hill Motorsports	56	Timmy Hill	Terry Elmore	8	
Toyota 7 Chevrolet 1	Mike Harmon Racing	74	Dawson Cram	Mike Harmon	1	
Toyota 7 Chevrolet 1	Mike Harmon Racing	74	Boston Oliver	Mike Harmon	1	
Toyota 7 Chevrolet 1	Mike Harmon Racing	74	Caleb Costner	Mike Harmon	6	
Chevrolet 1 Toyota 6	TC Motorsports	90	Justin Carroll	Terry Carroll	7	

=== Driver changes ===
==== Moving series ====
- Daniel Dye moved from the No. 43 truck for McAnally–Hilgemann Racing to drive the No. 10 for Kaulig Racing in the Xfinity Series.
- Dean Thompson moved from the No. 5 truck for Tricon Garage to drive the No. 26 for Sam Hunt Racing in the Xfinity Series.
- Christian Eckes vacated the No. 19 for McAnally–Hilgemann Racing to drive the No. 16 for Kaulig Racing in the Xfinity Series. Daniel Hemric moved from the Cup Series to replace Eckes.
- Taylor Gray vacated the No. 17 for Tricon Garage to drive the No. 54 for Joe Gibbs Racing in the Xfinity Series.
- Nick Sanchez moved up to the Xfinity Series full-time in 2025, driving the No. 48 car for Big Machine Racing.

==== Full-time rides ====
- Kaden Honeycutt was set to drive full-time in the No. 45 for Niece Motorsports, after driving part-time for the team in 2024. He later moved to Young's and Halmar Friesen.
- Dawson Sutton drove full-time in the No. 26 for Rackley W.A.R., after driving part-time for the team in 2024.
- Frankie Muniz drove the No. 33 for Reaume Brothers Racing full-time, after driving part-time for the team in 2024. It was later reduced to part-time with Muniz after a health issue.
- Daniel Hemric drove the No. 19 for McAnally–Hilgemann Racing full-time, after driving full-time in the NASCAR Cup Series in 2024.
- Toni Breidinger drove the No. 5 for Tricon Garage full-time, after driving part-time for the team in 2024.
- Gio Ruggiero drove the No. 17 for Tricon Garage full-time, after driving in the ARCA Menards Series East full-time in 2024.
- Connor Mosack drove the No. 81 (former No. 43) for McAnally–Hilgemann Racing full-time, after driving part-time in the Truck Series in 2024.
- Jack Wood drove the No. 91 for McAnally–Hilgemann Racing full-time, after driving part-time in the Truck Series in 2024. It was reduced to part-time after a health issue.
- Chandler Smith drove the No. 38 for Front Row Motorsports in 2025 after running full-time in the Xfinity Series from 2023 to 2024.
- Andrés Pérez de Lara was set to drive the No. 77 for Spire Motorsports full-time after having won the ARCA Menards Series championship in 2024. He would later swap teams to Niece.

=== Team changes ===
- Bret Holmes Racing shut down its operations at the end of the 2024 season, with Late Model team owner Chris Hettinger purchasing the team's assets and renaming it Hettinger Racing.
- Reaume Brothers Racing expanded to three full-time teams after acquiring the No. 2 Rev Racing entry.
- MBM Motorsports returned to the series on a part-time basis with the No. 69.
- Mike Harmon Racing returned to the series on a part-time basis with the No. 74 after a seven-year hiatus.

== Schedule ==
The 2025 schedule was released on August 29, 2024 and consists of 22 oval races and 3 road course races. The schedule had 25 races for the first time since 2011. With the season-finale at Phoenix being on October 31, the season finished in the month of October for the first time since 2000.

On February 21, 2025, Motor Racing Network and Performance Racing Network, the two radio networks to broadcast NASCAR races, announced that they would team up to broadcast the entire Truck Series schedule collaboratively starting at Atlanta (with the season-opener at Daytona already having been run) as the NASCAR Racing Network. Previously, the NASCAR-owned MRN had broadcast the entire Truck Series schedule, unlike the Cup and Xfinity Series, where PRN would broadcast all races in those two series at tracks owned by Speedway Motorsports, who also owns PRN.

Notes:

O Oval track
R Road course
- The Triple Truck Challenge races are listed in **bold**.

No	Race title	Track	Location	Date	Time	TV	Radio
1	Fresh From Florida 250	O Daytona International Speedway	Daytona Beach, Florida	February 14	7:30 pm	FS1	MRN
2	Fr8 208	O Atlanta Motor Speedway	Hampton, Georgia	February 22	1:30 pm	FS1	NRN
3	Ecosave 200	O Las Vegas Motor Speedway	Las Vegas, Nevada	March 14	9 pm	FS1	NRN
4	Baptist Health 200	O Homestead-Miami Speedway	Homestead, Florida	March 21	8 pm	Fox	NRN
5	**Boys & Girls Club of the Blue Ridge 200**	O Martinsville Speedway	Ridgeway, Virginia	March 28	7:30 pm	FS1	NRN
6	**Weather Guard Truck Race**	O Bristol Motor Speedway	Bristol, Tennessee	April 11	7:30 pm	FS1	NRN
7	**Black's Tire 200**	O Rockingham Speedway	Rockingham, North Carolina	April 18	5 pm	FS1	NRN
8	SpeedyCash.com 250	O Texas Motor Speedway	Fort Worth, Texas	May 2	8 pm	FS1	NRN
9	Heart of Health Care 200	O Kansas Speedway	Kansas City, Kansas	May 10	7:30 pm	FS1	NRN
10	Window World 250	O North Wilkesboro Speedway	North Wilkesboro, North Carolina	May 17	1:30 pm	FS1	NRN
11	North Carolina Education Lottery 200	O Charlotte Motor Speedway	Concord, North Carolina	May 23	8:30 pm	FS1	NRN
12	Rackley Roofing 200	O Nashville Superspeedway	Lebanon, Tennessee	May 30	8 pm	FS1	NRN
13	DQS Solutions & Staffing 250	O Michigan International Speedway	Brooklyn, Michigan	June 7	12 pm	Fox	NRN
14	MillerTech Battery 200	O Pocono Raceway	Long Pond, Pennsylvania	June 20	5 pm	FS1	NRN
15	LiUNA! 150	R Lime Rock Park	Lakeville, Connecticut	June 28	1 pm	Fox	NRN
16	TSport 200	O Lucas Oil Indianapolis Raceway Park	Brownsburg, Indiana	July 25	8 pm	FS1	NRN
17	Mission 176 at The Glen	R Watkins Glen International	Watkins Glen, New York	August 8	5 pm	FS1	NRN
18	eero 250	O Richmond Raceway	Richmond, Virginia	August 15	7:30 pm	FS1	NRN
NASCAR Truck Series Playoffs
Round of 10
19	Sober or Slammer 200	O Darlington Raceway	Darlington, South Carolina	August 30	12 pm	FS1	NRN
20	UNOH 250	O Bristol Motor Speedway	Bristol, Tennessee	September 11	8 pm	FS1	NRN
21	Team EJP 175	O New Hampshire Motor Speedway	Loudon, New Hampshire	September 20	12 pm	FS1	NRN
Round of 8
22	Ecosave 250	R Charlotte Motor Speedway (Roval)	Concord, North Carolina	October 3	3:30 pm	FS1	NRN
23	Love's RV Stop 225	O Talladega Superspeedway	Lincoln, Alabama	October 17	4 pm	Fox	NRN
24	Slim Jim 200	O Martinsville Speedway	Ridgeway, Virginia	October 24	6 pm	FS1	NRN
Championship 4
25	NASCAR Craftsman Truck Series Championship Race	O Phoenix Raceway	Avondale, Arizona	October 31	7:30 pm	FS1	NRN

=== Schedule changes ===
==== Added races ====
- Rockingham was on the schedule for the first time since 2013.
- Michigan was on the schedule for the first time since 2020.
- Lime Rock Park, a road course in Connecticut, was on the Truck Series schedule for the first time.
- Watkins Glen was on the schedule for the first time since 2021 and for only the second time since 2000.
- New Hampshire was on the schedule for the first time since 2017.
- The Charlotte Roval had a Truck Series race for the first time.

==== Removed races ====
- Circuit of the Americas was not on the schedule in 2025. It was the first time since NASCAR started racing there in 2021 that the track did not have a Truck Series race.
- Gateway was not on the schedule for the first time since 2013.
- Milwaukee was not on the schedule for the first time since 2022.
- The fall race at Kansas was taken off the schedule. The track had only one Truck Series race for the first time since 2021.

==== Date changes ====
- Homestead–Miami moved from October to March.
- Nashville moved from June to May.
- Pocono moved from July to June.
- The race at Darlington moved from May to Labor Day weekend and was run on the same weekend as the Cup Series' Southern 500 instead of on the track's spring Cup Series race weekend.

== Season summary ==
=== Regular season ===
Round 1: Fresh From Florida 250

Ben Rhodes scored the pole. Rhodes won the first stage and Matt Crafton won the second stage, his first since Atlanta in 2023. The race concluded dramatically when Parker Kligerman, initially crossing the finish line first, was disqualified during post-race inspection due to a height violation. Consequently, Corey Heim, who had finished second, was declared the winner, marking his twelfth career Truck Series victory and first of the season.

Round 2: Fr8 208

Connor Mosack won the pole for the race. Jack Wood won the first stage after a battle with Mosack and Kyle Busch won the second stage. Busch dominated the event, leading the most laps and executed a side-draft maneuver on the final lap to edge out Stewart Friesen by a margin of 0.017 seconds, securing his 67th career Truck Series victory and his first of the season.

Round 3: Ecosave 200

Corey Day would score his first career pole in the Truck Series. Ty Majeski won the first stage and Tyler Ankrum won the second stage. After each stage, the race went under the red flag for rain in the Las Vegas area. Shortly after, the race promptly resumed and ended with Corey Heim earning his second win of the season.

Round 4: Baptist Health 200

Corey Heim scored the pole for the race. Heim would sweep the stages but would fall short of the win by a power issues late in the race. Kyle Larson would come back after spinning out late and gaining 22 positions in the final 38 laps to win his first race of the season.

Round 5: Boys & Girls Club of the Blue Ridge 200

Corey Heim won the pole. Heim would sweep the stages but would fall short of the win again after he got spun into the wall. After a tough battle between teammate Tyler Ankrum, Daniel Hemric would earn his first career Truck Series victory and first of the season.

Round 6: Weather Guard Truck Race

Daniel Hemric scored the provisional pole for the race after practice and qualifying was cancelled. Chandler Smith won the first stage and Bayley Currey won the second stage. In the end, Smith would earn his sixth career Truck Series victory and first of the season.

Round 7: Black's Tire 200

Jake Garcia won the pole. Layne Riggs swept the stages. In the end, Tyler Ankrum would earn his second career Truck Series win, and his first of the season, snapping a 130-race winless streak.

Round 8: SpeedyCash.com 250

Tyler Ankrum scored the provisional pole for the race after practice and qualifying was cancelled. Grant Enfinger won the first stage and Corey Heim won the second stage. Heim would survive a three-wide challenge for the lead from Daniel Hemric and Ben Rhodes, to earn his fourteenth career Truck Series win, and his third of the season.

Round 9: Heart of Health Care 200

Jake Garcia won the pole. Corey Heim won the first stage and Carson Hocevar won the second stage. In the end, Hocevar would hold off Layne Riggs to earn his fifth career Truck Series win, and his first of the season. Riggs was disqualified during post-race inspection due to a bed cover issue.

Round 10: Window World 250

Corey Heim scored the provisional pole for the race after practice and qualifying was cancelled. Gio Ruggiero won the first stage and Grant Enfinger won the second stage. In the end, Smith would steal the win on the final lap after Heim and teammate Layne Riggs made contact in turn two, causing Heim to spin and Smith to earn his seventh career Truck Series win, and his second of the season.

Round 11: North Carolina Education Lottery 200

Gio Ruggiero won the pole. Corey Heim swept the stages and would win his fifteenth career Truck Series win, and his fourth of the season.

Round 12: Rackley Roofing 200

Corey Heim scored the provisional pole for the race after practice and qualifying was cancelled. Layne Riggs won the first stage and Heim won the second stage. In the end, Rajah Caruth would hold off Heim and earned his second career Truck Series victory and first of the season.

Round 13: DQS Solutions & Staffing 250

Luke Fenhaus won the pole. Corey Heim swept the stages. In the end, Stewart Friesen held off Grant Enfinger in a triple overtime thriller to earn his fourth career Truck Series victory, and broke a 72-race winless streak dating back to the 2022 SpeedyCash.com 220.

Round 14: MillerTech Battery 200

Layne Riggs won the pole. Riggs won the first stage and Corey Heim won the second stage. Heim's stage win marked his twelfth of the season, setting an all-time record in the Truck Series. In the end, Riggs would take advantage of the Heim's late mishaps, and led the final twenty laps of the race to earn his third career Truck Series win, and his first of the season.

Round 15: LiUNA! 150

Corey Heim won the pole. Heim swept the stages and proceeded to lead all but one lap to win his fifth race of the season.

Round 16: TSport 200

Corey Heim was awarded the pole due to inclement weather cancelling qualifying. Layne Riggs swept the stages. Riggs lead 160 of 200 laps as he would claim his second race win of the season. Stewart Friesen was disqualified following post-race inspection due to a front height violation.

Round 17: Mission 176 at The Glen

Corey Heim won the pole. Heim won the first stage and Ben Rhodes won the second stage. In the end, Heim held off Daniel Hemric in a triple overtime thriller to earn his sixth win of the season.

Round 18: eero 250

Corey Heim won the pole. Ty Majeski swept both stages but his dominant performance came to a close due to late race troubles. In the end, Heim capitalized off of Majeski's setbacks to earn his seventh win of the season.

=== Playoffs ===
Round 19: Sober or Slammer 200

Layne Riggs won the pole. Corey Heim won the first stage and Riggs won the second stage. Riggs led a race-high 71 laps, until hitting the wall late in the event, falling back to finish 17th. In the end, Heim would take advantage of late-race troubles for Riggs, and led the final 19 laps to earn his 19th career Truck Series win, and his eighth of the season. He would also advance into the next round of the playoffs.

Round 20: UNOH 250

Jake Garcia won the pole. Garcia won the first stage and Corey Heim won stage two. In the end, Layne Riggs would overcome from a first-lap spin, and dominate the final stage of the race, leading the final 110 laps to earn his fifth career Truck Series win, and his third of the season. He would also advance into the next round of the playoffs.

Round 21: Team EJP 175

Corey Heim won the pole. Heim would continue one of the dominating seasons in series history, winning both stages and led a race-high 124 laps from the pole position to earn his 20th career Truck Series win and his record-tying ninth of the season, matching Greg Biffle's 1999 season.

Round 22: EcoSave 250

Corey Heim won the pole but was caught up in a wreck on lap one. Kaden Honeycutt won stage one and stage two. Brent Crews was close to winning when a caution came out on lap 65 due to Toni Breidinger's truck stalling out, causing a green–white–checkered finish. Heim won the race, breaking Greg Biffle's win record in one season that was held since 1999. Heim would also advance into the Championship 4.

Round 23: Love's RV Stop 225

Gio Ruggiero won the pole. Rajah Caruth won stage one while Ruggiero won stage two. Ruggiero, leading a race-high 37 laps, survived a late overtime restart to win the race, his first career Truck Series win.

Round 24: Slim Jim 200

Layne Riggs won the pole. However, Corey Heim swept stages one and two. Despite the final stage riddled with cautions, Heim would lead 77 laps and win the race. The end of the race featured one of the most dramatic elimination events in the Playoff era. While Kaden Honeycutt and Riggs were tied in the point standings, Honeycutt won the tiebreaker due to finishing second in the race to Riggs' third-place finish, thus advancing Honeycutt to the Championship 4. Ty Majeski and Tyler Ankrum also advanced to the Championship 4.

Round 25: NASCAR Craftsman Truck Series Championship Race

Layne Riggs won the pole. Corey Heim swept stages one and two. Following the second to last restart, Heim was able to make a seven-wide pass to eventually make his way to second. On the final restart, Heim would pass Ty Majeski for the race lead, holding on to win his 12th race of the season and his first Truck Series championship.

== Results and standings ==
=== Race results ===
No.	Race	Pole position	Most laps led	Fastest race lap	Winning driver	Manufacturer	No.	Winning team	Report
1	Fresh From Florida 250	Ben Rhodes	Chandler Smith	Layne Riggs	Corey Heim	Toyota	11	Tricon Garage	Report
2	Fr8 208	Connor Mosack	Kyle Busch	Tanner Gray	Kyle Busch	Chevrolet	7	Spire Motorsports	Report
3	Ecosave 200	Corey Day	Corey Heim	Ty Majeski	Corey Heim	Toyota	11	Tricon Garage	Report
4	Baptist Health 200	Corey Heim	Corey Heim	Ross Chastain	Kyle Larson	Chevrolet	07	Spire Motorsports	Report
5	Boys & Girls Club of the Blue Ridge 200	Corey Heim	Corey Heim	Corey Heim	Daniel Hemric	Chevrolet	19	McAnally–Hilgemann Racing	Report
6	Weather Guard Truck Race	Daniel Hemric	Chandler Smith	Kyle Larson	Chandler Smith	Ford	38	Front Row Motorsports	Report
7	Black's Tire 200	Jake Garcia	Corey Heim	Corey Heim	Tyler Ankrum	Chevrolet	18	McAnally–Hilgemann Racing	Report
8	SpeedyCash.com 250	Tyler Ankrum	Corey Heim	Carson Hocevar	Corey Heim	Toyota	11	Tricon Garage	Report
9	Heart of Health Care 200	Jake Garcia	Carson Hocevar	Carson Hocevar	Carson Hocevar	Chevrolet	7	Spire Motorsports	Report
10	Window World 250	Corey Heim	Corey Heim	Chandler Smith	Chandler Smith	Ford	38	Front Row Motorsports	Report
11	North Carolina Education Lottery 200	Gio Ruggiero	Corey Heim	Corey Heim	Corey Heim	Toyota	11	Tricon Garage	Report
12	Rackley Roofing 200	Corey Heim	Rajah Caruth	Corey Heim	Rajah Caruth	Chevrolet	71	Spire Motorsports	Report
13	DQS Solutions & Staffing 250	Luke Fenhaus	Carson Hocevar	Kaden Honeycutt	Stewart Friesen	Toyota	52	Halmar Friesen Racing	Report
14	MillerTech Battery 200	Layne Riggs	Corey Heim	Layne Riggs	Layne Riggs	Ford	34	Front Row Motorsports	Report
15	LiUNA! 150	Corey Heim	Corey Heim	Corey Heim	Corey Heim	Toyota	11	Tricon Garage	Report
16	TSport 200	Corey Heim	Layne Riggs	Corey Heim	Layne Riggs	Ford	34	Front Row Motorsports	Report
17	Mission 176 at The Glen	Corey Heim	Corey Heim	Andrés Pérez de Lara	Corey Heim	Toyota	11	Tricon Garage	Report
18	eero 250	Corey Heim	Ty Majeski	Daniel Hemric	Corey Heim	Toyota	11	Tricon Garage	Report
NASCAR Craftsman Truck Series Playoffs
Round of 10
19	Sober or Slammer 200	Layne Riggs	Layne Riggs	Chandler Smith	Corey Heim	Toyota	11	Tricon Garage	Report
20	UNOH 250	Jake Garcia	Corey Heim	Jake Garcia	Layne Riggs	Ford	34	Front Row Motorsports	Report
21	Team EJP 175	Corey Heim	Corey Heim	Corey Heim	Corey Heim	Toyota	11	Tricon Garage	Report
Round of 8
22	Ecosave 250	Corey Heim	Brent Crews	Brent Crews	Corey Heim	Toyota	11	Tricon Garage	Report
23	Love's RV Stop 225	Gio Ruggiero	Gio Ruggiero	Ben Rhodes	Gio Ruggiero	Toyota	17	Tricon Garage	Report
24	Slim Jim 200	Layne Riggs	Corey Heim	Layne Riggs	Corey Heim	Toyota	11	Tricon Garage	Report
Championship 4
25	NASCAR Craftsman Truck Series Championship Race	Layne Riggs	Corey Heim	Corey Heim	Corey Heim	Toyota	11	Tricon Garage	Report

=== Drivers' championship ===
(key) Bold – Pole position awarded by time. Italics – Pole position set by competition-based formula. * – Most laps led. ^{F} – Fastest lap. ^{1} – Stage 1 winner. ^{2} – Stage 2 winner. ^{1-10} – Regular season top 10 finishers.
. – Eliminated after Round of 10 . – Eliminated after Round of 8

Pos.	Driver	DAY	ATL	LVS	HOM	MAR	BRI	ROC	TEX	KAN	NWS	CLT	NSH	MCH	POC	LRP	IRP	GLN	RCH	DAR	BRI	NHA	ROV	TAL	MAR	PHO	Pts.	Stage	Bonus
1	Corey Heim	1	23	1*	**3***^{12}	**6***^{12F}	3	8*^{F}	1*^{2}	3^{1}	17*	1*^{12F}	2^{2F}	18^{12}	23*^{2}	**1***^{12F}	3^{F}	**1***^{1}	**1**	1^{1}	3*^{2}	**1***^{12F}	**1**	2	1*^{12}	1*^{12F}	4040	–	79^{1}
2	Ty Majeski	3	8	4^{1F}	11	13	33	31	10	14	6	32	8	15	9	2	5	7	2*^{12}	4	4	5	8	3	7	2	4035	–	10^{4}
3	Kaden Honeycutt	35	6	12	10	26	8	6	32	8	8	3	6	21^{F}	3	12	14	34	10	18	12	7	14^{12}	10	2	3	4034	–	5^{8}
4	Tyler Ankrum	34	3	10^{2}	4	2	4	1	4	16	3	12	17	24	26	10	8	5	11	7	20	11	9	6	9	14	4023	–	10^{7}
NASCAR Craftsman Truck Series Playoffs cut-off
Pos.	Driver	DAY	ATL	LVS	HOM	MAR	BRI	ROC	TEX	KAN	NWS	CLT	NSH	MCH	POC	LRP	IRP	GLN	RCH	DAR	BRI	NHA	ROV	TAL	MAR	PHO	Pts.	Stage	Bonus
5	Layne Riggs	13^{F}	20	5	2	11	6	11^{12}	28	31	2	4	3^{1}	10	**1**^{1F}	13	1*^{12}	10	3	**17***^{2}	1	3	21	5	**3**^{F}	**4**	2297	18	32^{2}
6	Rajah Caruth	30	29	7	22	8	9	4	3	21	15	9	1*	31	10	21	10	32	19	12	15	10	4	9^{1}	34	5	2237	45	5
7	Grant Enfinger	4	10	2	9	27	12	5	23^{1}	9	5^{2}	6	10	2	17	11	4	24	13	3	21	6	7	36	12	24	2198	24	7^{6}
8	Chandler Smith	6*	5	8	8	4	1*^{1}	13	16	17	1^{F}	34	7	8	7	6	6	23	9	30^{F}	30	2	19	22	6	8	2179	17	19^{3}
9	Daniel Hemric	7	16	13	5	1	13	3	2	10	4	8	4	27	5	9	7	2	33^{F}	2	5	12	11	34	31	33	2177	15	11^{5}
10	Jake Garcia	12	9	26	7	3	7	**2**	21	**7**	12	11	12	7	28	24	15	15	7	10	**33**^{1F}	16	23	29	18	6	2148	21	3^{9}
11	Gio Ruggiero **(R)**	2	11	15	29	12	10	10	31	4	7^{1}	**21**	13	12	11	3	25	3	6	22	13	4	3	**1***^{2}	11	31	703	89	1
12	Ben Rhodes	**20**^{1}	7	14	33	5	5	32	6	11	23	17	14	4	18	4	11	26^{2}	8	11	2	24	36	16^{F}	14	29	632	102	2^{10}
13	Tanner Gray	22	15^{F}	3	17	21	18	28	5	27	11	26	16	17	2	14	13	28	14	6	6	29	31	12	8	21	599	83	–
14	Connor Mosack **(R)**	32	**25**	20	19	25	24	9	22	18	16	23	23	19	6	16	17	16	18	13	7	36	10	14	30	26	515	74	–
15	Matt Crafton	27^{2}	22	9	13	28	16	24	7	13	18	20	25	6	27	19	18	13	26	21	10	26	24	7	29	13	494	29	1
16	Andrés Pérez de Lara **(R)**	14	27	17	25	7	19	12	29	19	24	16	19	9	16	17	22	21^{F}	21	16	8	15	32	17	28	30	472	26	–
17	Matt Mills	29	13	16	14	15	20	30	20	12	25	7	22	23	20	26	21	9	17	29	16	23	17	19	27	11	456	12	–
18	Dawson Sutton **(R)**	25	17	19	23	16	17	19	9	15	26	31	11	13	29	30	19	14	31	19	17	14	13	4	19	34	447	6	–
19	Jack Wood	24	21^{1}	30	21	19	11	7	11	24	20	25	20	20	14	22	20	33		14	22	22	22	21	13	10	443	21	1
20	Stewart Friesen	23	2	6	16	9	27	29	24	5	14	13	21	1	8	23	35										397	57	5
21	Spencer Boyd	19	19	25	28	17	30	15	15	23	28	24	26	16	25	31	24	18	28	23	27	21	20	15	17	17	374	–	–
22	Bayley Currey	21	4	18			23^{2}	20	8	26			9						20	25	19	18	12	31	21	27	309	19	1
23	Toni Breidinger **(R)**	28	24	21	26	24	25	18	26	20	21	30	30	22	22	29	26	29	24	24	26	25	30	33	26	25	291	–	–
24	Corey LaJoie													5					5	20	9	8	18	8	5	7	282	34	–
25	Brent Crews										22					8	23	17	16		24	17	2*^{F}		4	28	257	47	–
26	Frankie Muniz **(R)**	10	26	24	24	33	31	23	25	28	29	27	32	14	19	28	27	27	32					20	23	19	256	–	–
27	Luke Fenhaus **(R)**		14	23	20		22	26	27			18	18	**3**			12		22					23			231	15	–
28	Nathan Byrd	31	31	29	27	29	28	14	14	29			28	30	21					27				18		15	185	–	–
29	Timmy Hill	11						21				19				25		20		8			16		16		160	–	–
30	Stefan Parsons				18				12			22								15	25					12	123	5	–
31	Parker Kligerman	36					14	25				14						31			14		35	26			106	5	–
32	Josh Reaume	18	18	28		RL^{†}			18					25			RL^{‡}				28		33	24			104	–	–
33	Luke Baldwin					22				30	13				12											16	92	–	–
34	Cody Dennison					30		27	19	22		29			33		34										65	–	–
35	Justin Carroll	DNQ	28			18	26	34				33													20		63	–	–
36	Norm Benning	16				34	34	35			34			32	34		31				34	34		32	33		61	–	–
37	Conner Jones										27				31						18	31			22		58	2	–
38	Patrick Emerling										19				15							28					49	–	–
39	Greg Van Alst																28				29			25		18	48	–	–
40	Clayton Green												27		30				35	32	36				35	20	44	–	–
41	Lawless Alan					10								28													40	4	–
42	Wesley Slimp															33		12					27				39	–	–
43	Caleb Costner																		30	28	35	33		35		22	39	–	–
44	Jason White	8																						30			36	–	–
45	Trevor Bayne																			5							34	2	–
46	Jordan Taylor															20											33	16	–
47	Cameron Waters															5											32	–	–
48	Ben Maier															18							25				31	–	–
49	Johnny Sauter	17																									29	9	–
50	Derek White										33							19				30					29	–	–
51	Tyler Reif																									9	28	–	–
52	Cole Butcher																				23					23	28	–	–
53	Matt Gould					23													25								26	–	–
54	Stephen Mallozzi			31	34		35	33											34	31		35					26	–	–
55	Mike Christopher Jr.																					13					24	–	–
56	B. J. McLeod											15															22	–	–
57	Morgen Baird									25				29													20	–	–
58	Jayson Alexander										30						30					32					19	–	–
59	Blake Lothian																					20					17	–	–
60	A. J. Waller					31											32								32		16	–	–
61	Ryan Roulette					35					32								29								15	–	–
62	Casey Mears																								24		13	–	–
63	Gian Buffomante																	25									12	–	–
64	William Lambros															27		35									12	–	–
65	Keith McGee		32		30																						12	–	–
66	Akinori Ogata				32								31														11	–	–
67	Bret Holmes																							28			9	–	–
68	Michel Disdier				31																						6	–	–
69	Mason Maggio	15^{±}										28^{±}								26^{±}	31^{±}		28^{±}			32	5	–	–
70	Dale Quarterley															32											5	–	–
71	Treyten Lapcevich																				32						5	–	–
72	Clay Greenfield	33																			DNQ						4	–	–
73	Boston Oliver																33										4	–	–
74	Carter Fartuch																						34				3	–	–
75	Bryan Dauzat	DNQ													35												2	–	–
Ineligible for Craftsman Truck championship points
Pos	Driver	DAY	ATL	LVS	HOM	MAR	BRI	ROC	TEX	KAN	NWS	CLT	NSH	MCH	POC	LRP	IRP	GLN	RCH	DAR	BRI	NHA	ROV	TAL	MAR	PHO	Pts.	Stage	Bonus
	Kyle Busch		1*^{2}								9	5	15					36											
	Kyle Larson				1		2^{F}																						
	Carson Hocevar								17^{F}	1*^{2F}				11*	13														
	William Byron					14				2																			
	Ross Chastain				6^{F}							2		26			9	30											
	Corey Day			**27**	15	32	15	22					5				2			9	11								
	Brandon Jones				12		32	17	30	6		10			4														
	Christopher Bell																	4											
	Sammy Smith							16			10							6	4										
	Justin Haley	5		11																									
	Connor Zilisch																	8					5						
	Josh Bilicki															7							6						
	William Sawalich	9	30	22									24					11											
	Christian Eckes																		12			9							
	Brenden Queen																16								10				
	Kris Wright																						26	11					
	Michael McDowell	26	12																										
	Nick Sanchez								13																				
	J. J. Yeley																							13					
	Thomas Annunziata															15													
	Carson Kvapil																		15										
	Will Rodgers																						15						
	Patrick Staropoli					20	29												23						15				
	Mason Massey																					19							
	Tyler Tomassi						21				31		29		24							27	29	27					
	Chris Buescher																	22											
	Logan Bearden																								25				
	Nick Leitz																		27										
	Jordan Anderson																29												
	Dawson Cram														32														
	Alex Labbé															34													
Pos.	Driver	DAY	ATL	LVS	HOM	MAR	BRI	ROC	TEX	KAN	NWS	CLT	NSH	MCH	POC	LRP	IRP	GLN	RCH	DAR	BRI	NHA	ROV	TAL	MAR	PHO	Pts.	Stage	Bonus
^{†} – Relieved A. J. Waller during the race at Martinsville in March. Since Waller started the race, he is officially credited with 31st place.^{‡} – Relieved A. J. Waller during the race at Indianapolis. Since Waller started the race, he is officially credited with 32nd place.^{±} Mason Maggio started to receive points at Phoenix.

=== Owners' championship (Top 15) ===
(key) Bold – Pole position awarded by time. Italics – Pole position set by competition-based formula. * – Most laps led. ^{F} – Fastest lap. ^{1} – Stage 1 winner. ^{2} – Stage 2 winner. ^{1-10} – Regular season top 10 finishers.
. – Eliminated after Round of 10 . – Eliminated after Round of 8

Pos.	No.	Car Owner	DAY	ATL	LVS	HOM	MAR	BRI	ROC	TEX	KAN	NWS	CLT	NSH	MCH	POC	LRP	IRP	GLN	RCH	DAR	BRI	NHA	ROV	TAL	MAR	PHO	Points	Bonus
1	11	David Gilliland	1	23	1*	**3***^{12}	**6***^{12}	3	8*^{F}	1*^{2}	3^{1}	17*	1*^{12F}	2^{2F}	18^{12}	24*^{2}	**1***^{12F}	3^{F}	**1***^{1}	**1**	1^{1}	3*^{2}	**1***^{12F}	**1**	2	1*^{12}	1*^{12F}	4040	79^{1}
2	98	Mike Curb	3	8	4^{1F}	11	13	33	31	10	14	6	32	8	15	2	2	5	7	2*^{12}	4	4	5	8	3	7	2	4035	9^{5}
3	52	Chris Larsen	23	2	6	16	9	27	29	24	5	14	13	21	1	8	23	35	4	10	18	12	7	14^{12}	10	2	3	4034	5
4	34	Bob Jenkins	13^{F}	20	5	2	11	6	11^{12}	28	31	2	4	3^{1}	10	**1**^{1F}	13	1*^{12}	10	3	**17***^{2F}	1	3	21	5	**3**^{F}	**4**	4033	32^{2}
NASCAR Craftsman Truck Series Playoffs cut-off
5	18	Bill McAnally	34	3	10^{2}	4	2	4	1	4	16	3	12	17	24	26	10	8	5	11	7	20	11	9	6	9	14	2241	8^{9}
6	71	Jeff Dickerson	30	29	7	22	8	9	4	3	21	15	9	1*	31	10	21	10	32	19	12	15	10	4	9^{1}	34	5	2237	5
7	7	Jeff Dickerson	5	1*^{2}	**27**	15	32	15	22	17^{F}	1*^{2F}	10	5	5	11*	13	20	2	6	4	9	11	28	5	13	10	12	2215	7^{4}
8	9	Larry Berg	4	10	2	9	27	12	5	23^{1}	9	5^{2}	6	10	2	17	11	4	24	13	3	21	6	7	36	12	24	2197	6^{7}
9	38	Bob Jenkins	6*	5	8	8	4	1*^{1}	13	16	17	1^{F}	34	7	8	7	6	6	23	9	30	30	2	19	22	6	8	2179	19^{3}
10	19	Bill McAnally	7	16	13	5	1	13	3	2	10	4	8	4	27	5	9	7	2	33^{F}	2	5	12	11	34	31	33	2176	10^{6}
11	77	Jeff Dickerson	14	27	17	25	7	19	12	29	19	24	16	19	9	16	17	22	21^{F}	5	20	9	8	18	8	5	7	726	1
12	17	David Gilliland	2	11	15	29	12	10	10	31	4	7^{1}	**21**	13	12	11	3	25	3	6	22	13	4	3	**1***^{2}	11	31	703	1
13	45	Greg Fowler	35	6	12	10	26	8	6	32	8	8	3	6	21^{F}	3	12	14	8	20	25	19	18	12	31	21	27	680	–^{8}
14	13	Duke Thorson	12	9	26	7	3	7	**2**	21	**7**	12	11	12	7	28	24	15	15	7	10	**33**^{1F}	16	23	29	18	6	656	–^{10}
15	99	Duke Thorson	**20**^{1}	7	14	33	5	5	32	6	11	23	17	14	4	18	4	11	26^{2}	8	11	2	24	36	16^{F}	14	29	632	2
Pos.	No.	Car Owner	DAY	ATL	LVS	HOM	MAR	BRI	ROC	TEX	KAN	NWS	CLT	NSH	MCH	POC	LRP	IRP	GLN	RCH	DAR	BRI	NHA	ROV	TAL	MAR	PHO	Points	Bonus

=== Manufacturers' championship ===
Pos	Manufacturer	Wins	Points
1	Toyota	14	925
2	Chevrolet	6	877
3	Ford	5	865

== See also ==
- 2025 NASCAR Cup Series
- 2025 NASCAR Xfinity Series
- 2025 ARCA Menards Series
- 2025 ARCA Menards Series East
- 2025 ARCA Menards Series West
- 2025 NASCAR Whelen Modified Tour
- 2025 NASCAR Canada Series
- 2025 NASCAR Mexico Series
- 2025 NASCAR Euro Series
- 2025 NASCAR Brasil Series
- 2025 CARS Tour
- 2025 SMART Modified Tour
