= NASCAR Truck Series at Lime Rock Park =

NASCAR Craftsman Truck Series race at Lime Rock Park

LiUNA! 150

NASCAR Truck Series
- Venue: Lime Rock Park
- Location: Lakeville, Connecticut, United States
- Corporate sponsor: LiUNA!
- First race: 2025
- Distance: 150 miles (241.40 km)
- Laps: 100; Stage 1/2: 35; Stage 3: 30

Circuit information
- Surface: Asphalt
- Length: 1.530 mi (2.462 km)
- Turns: 7

The LiUNA! 150 is a 150-mile-long (241.402 km) event in the NASCAR Truck Series that takes place at Lime Rock Park in Connecticut. The race takes place on the same day as the Pit Boss/FoodMaxx 250 in the NASCAR O'Reilly Auto Parts Series.

Grant Enfinger is the defending race winner.

== History ==
2025 Lime Rock Park

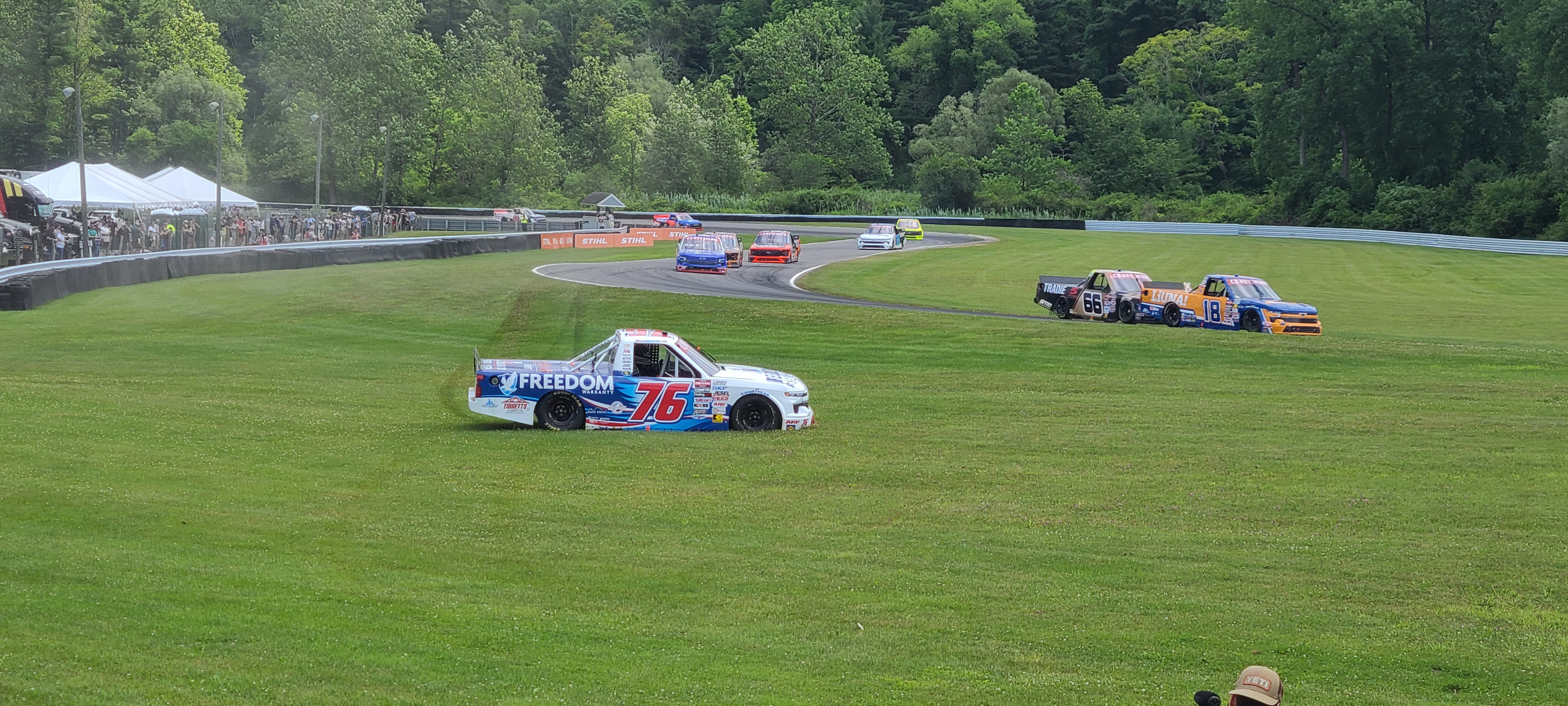
Spencer Boyd's No. 76 Freedom Racing Enterprises Chevrolet

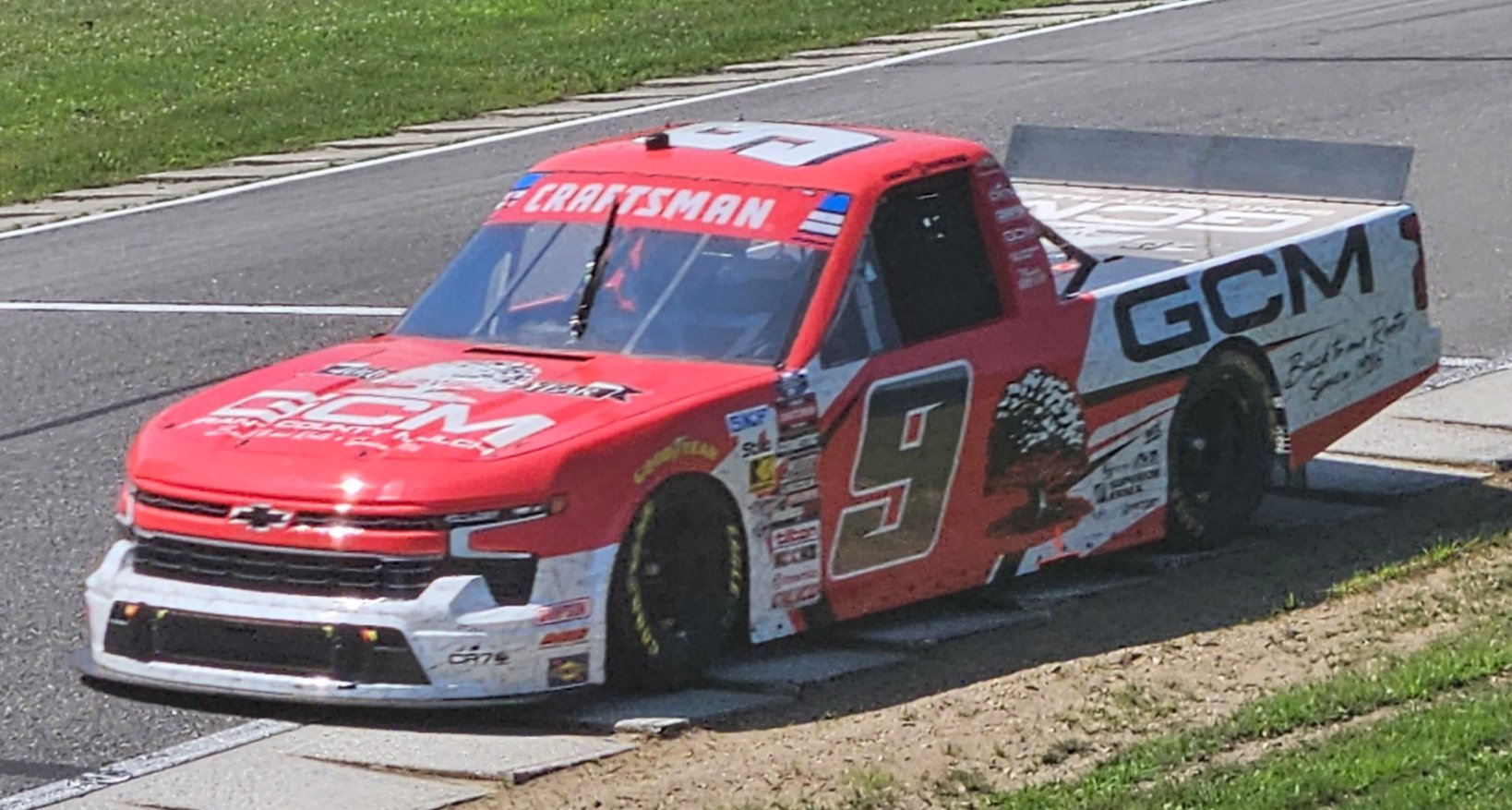
Grant Enfinger's No. 9 CR7 Motorsports

On August 29, 2024, the 2025 schedule released announcing a race at Lime Rock. The Laborers' International Union of North America (LiUNA) was announced as the inaugural title sponsor for the race. The inaugural race was won by Corey Heim, who swept both stages and led a race-high 99 laps. In 2026, Grant Enfinger won after outlasting a chaotic event featuring seven cautions, surviving a dramatic late-race restart over Landen Lewis and Kaden Honeycutt to capture his first career road course victory.

== Past winners ==
Year	Date	No.	Driver	Team	Manufacturer	Race Distance		Race Time	Average Speed (mph)	Report	Ref
Year	Date	No.	Driver	Team	Manufacturer	Laps	Miles (km)	Race Time	Average Speed (mph)	Report	Ref
2025	June 28	11	Corey Heim	Tricon Garage	Toyota	100	150 (241.402)	2:03:46	71.651	Report	
2026	July 11	9	Grant Enfinger	CR7 Motorsports	Chevrolet	100	150 (241.402)	2:33:05	57.929	Report	
2027	July 10									Report	

Previous race: DQS Solutions & Staffing 250	NASCAR Truck Series; LiUNA! 150	Next race: TBA
