= 2025 Ecosave 200 =

3rd race of the 2025 NASCAR Craftsman Truck Series

Race details
- Race 3 of 25 of the 2025 NASCAR Craftsman Truck Series
- Date: March 14, 2025
- Location: Las Vegas Motor Speedway in North Las Vegas, Nevada
- Course: Permanent racing facility
- Course length: 1.5 miles (2.4 km)
- Distance: 134 laps, 201 mi (323 km)
- Scheduled distance: 134 laps, 201 mi (323 km)
- Average speed: 107.010 mph (172.216 km/h)

Pole position
Driver	Corey Day	Spire Motorsports
- Time: 30.388

Most laps led
Driver	Corey Heim	Tricon Garage
- Laps: 42

Winner
No. 11	Corey Heim	Tricon Garage

Television in the United States
- Network: FS1
- Announcers: Jamie Little, Joey Logano, and Brad Keselowski

Radio in the United States
- Radio: NRN

The 2025 Ecosave 200 was the 3rd stock car race of the 2025 NASCAR Craftsman Truck Series, and the 8th iteration of the event. The race was held on Friday, March 14, 2025, at Las Vegas Motor Speedway in North Las Vegas, Nevada, a 1.5 miles (2.4 km) permanent asphalt quad-oval shaped intermediate speedway. The race took the scheduled 134 laps to complete.

In an action-packed race with numerous rain delays, Corey Heim, driving for Tricon Garage, took the lead late in the race and dominated the final stage, leading a race-high 42 laps to earn his 13th career NASCAR Craftsman Truck Series win, and his second of the season. To fill out the podium, Grant Enfinger, driving for CR7 Motorsports, and Tanner Gray, driving for Tricon Garage, would finish 2nd and 3rd, respectively.

== Report ==
=== Background ===
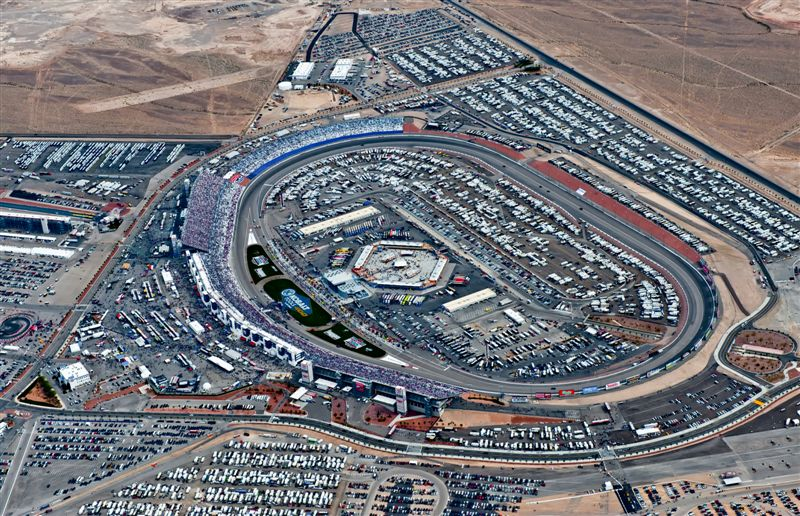
Las Vegas Motor Speedway, the track where the race will be held.

Las Vegas Motor Speedway, located in Clark County, Nevada outside the Las Vegas city limits and about 15 miles northeast of the Las Vegas Strip, is a 1,200-acre (490 ha) complex of multiple tracks for motorsports racing. The complex is owned by Speedway Motorsports, Inc., which is headquartered in Charlotte, North Carolina.

==== Entry list ====
- (R) denotes rookie driver.
- (i) denotes driver who is ineligible for series driver points.

#	Driver	Team	Make
1	William Sawalich (i)	Tricon Garage	Toyota
02	Nathan Byrd	Young's Motorsports	Chevrolet
2	Stephen Mallozzi	Reaume Brothers Racing	Ford
5	Toni Breidinger (R)	Tricon Garage	Toyota
07	Justin Haley (i)	Spire Motorsports	Chevrolet
7	Corey Day (i)	Spire Motorsports	Chevrolet
9	Grant Enfinger	CR7 Motorsports	Chevrolet
11	Corey Heim	Tricon Garage	Toyota
13	Jake Garcia	ThorSport Racing	Ford
15	Tanner Gray	Tricon Garage	Toyota
17	Gio Ruggiero (R)	Tricon Garage	Toyota
18	Tyler Ankrum	McAnally-Hilgemann Racing	Chevrolet
19	Daniel Hemric	McAnally-Hilgemann Racing	Chevrolet
22	Josh Reaume	Reaume Brothers Racing	Ford
26	Dawson Sutton (R)	Rackley W.A.R.	Chevrolet
33	Frankie Muniz (R)	Reaume Brothers Racing	Ford
34	Layne Riggs	Front Row Motorsports	Ford
38	Chandler Smith	Front Row Motorsports	Ford
42	Matt Mills	Niece Motorsports	Chevrolet
44	Bayley Currey	Niece Motorsports	Chevrolet
45	Kaden Honeycutt	Niece Motorsports	Chevrolet
52	Stewart Friesen	Halmar Friesen Racing	Toyota
66	Luke Fenhaus	ThorSport Racing	Ford
71	Rajah Caruth	Spire Motorsports	Chevrolet
76	Spencer Boyd	Freedom Racing Enterprises	Chevrolet
77	Andrés Pérez de Lara (R)	Spire Motorsports	Chevrolet
81	Connor Mosack (R)	McAnally-Hilgemann Racing	Chevrolet
88	Matt Crafton	ThorSport Racing	Ford
91	Jack Wood	McAnally-Hilgemann Racing	Chevrolet
98	Ty Majeski	ThorSport Racing	Ford
99	Ben Rhodes	ThorSport Racing	Ford
Official entry list

== Practice ==
For practice, drivers were separated into two different groups, A and B. Both sessions were 25 minutes long, and was held on Friday, March 14, at 12:35 PM PST. Ben Rhodes, driving for ThorSport Racing, would set the fastest time between both sessions, with a lap of 30.269, and a speed of 178.400 mph (287.107 km/h).

Pos.	#	Driver	Team	Make	Time	Speed
1	99	Ben Rhodes	ThorSport Racing	Ford	30.269	178.400
2	98	Ty Majeski	ThorSport Racing	Ford	30.271	178.389
3	18	Tyler Ankrum	McAnally-Hilgemann Racing	Chevrolet	30.308	178.171
Full practice results

== Qualifying ==
Qualifying was held on Friday, March 14, at 1:40 PM PST. Since Las Vegas Motor Speedway is an intermediate speedway, the qualifying procedure used is a single-car, single-lap system with one round. Drivers will be on track by themselves and will have one lap to post a qualifying time, and whoever sets the fastest time will win the pole.

Corey Day, driving for Spire Motorsports, would score the pole for the race, with a lap of 30.388, and a speed of 177.702 mph (285.984 km/h).

No drivers would fail to qualify.

=== Qualifying results ===
Pos.	#	Driver	Team	Make	Time	Speed
1	7	Corey Day (i)	Spire Motorsports	Chevrolet	30.388	177.702
2	18	Tyler Ankrum	McAnally-Hilgemann Racing	Chevrolet	30.405	177.602
3	13	Jake Garcia	ThorSport Racing	Ford	30.439	177.404
4	07	Justin Haley (i)	Spire Motorsports	Chevrolet	30.440	177.398
5	52	Stewart Friesen	Halmar Friesen Racing	Toyota	30.467	177.241
6	71	Rajah Caruth	Spire Motorsports	Chevrolet	30.521	176.927
7	98	Ty Majeski	ThorSport Racing	Ford	30.541	176.811
8	17	Gio Ruggiero (R)	Tricon Garage	Toyota	30.545	176.788
9	26	Dawson Sutton (R)	Rackley W.A.R.	Chevrolet	30.584	176.563
10	81	Connor Mosack (R)	McAnally-Hilgemann Racing	Chevrolet	30.608	176.424
11	88	Matt Crafton	ThorSport Racing	Ford	30.625	176.327
12	19	Daniel Hemric	McAnally-Hilgemann Racing	Chevrolet	30.647	176.200
13	77	Andrés Pérez de Lara (R)	Spire Motorsports	Chevrolet	30.680	176.010
14	91	Jack Wood	McAnally-Hilgemann Racing	Chevrolet	30.706	175.861
15	99	Ben Rhodes	ThorSport Racing	Ford	30.708	175.850
16	11	Corey Heim	Tricon Garage	Toyota	30.709	175.844
17	38	Chandler Smith	Front Row Motorsports	Ford	30.715	175.810
18	15	Tanner Gray	Tricon Garage	Toyota	30.736	175.690
19	44	Bayley Currey	Niece Motorsports	Chevrolet	30.772	175.484
20	9	Grant Enfinger	CR7 Motorsports	Chevrolet	30.781	175.433
21	76	Spencer Boyd	Freedom Racing Enterprises	Chevrolet	30.788	175.393
22	45	Kaden Honeycutt	Niece Motorsports	Chevrolet	30.794	175.359
23	34	Layne Riggs	Front Row Motorsports	Ford	30.812	175.256
24	42	Matt Mills	Niece Motorsports	Chevrolet	30.828	175.165
25	1	William Sawalich (i)	Tricon Garage	Toyota	30.888	174.825
26	66	Luke Fenhaus	ThorSport Racing	Ford	30.908	174.712
27	5	Toni Breidinger (R)	Tricon Garage	Toyota	30.946	174.498
28	22	Josh Reaume	Reaume Brothers Racing	Ford	31.196	173.099
29	33	Frankie Muniz (R)	Reaume Brothers Racing	Ford	31.499	171.434
30	2	Stephen Mallozzi	Reaume Brothers Racing	Ford	32.778	164.745
31	02	Nathan Byrd	Young's Motorsports	Chevrolet	—	—
Official qualifying results
Official starting lineup

== Race results ==
Stage 1 Laps: 30

Pos.	#	Driver	Team	Make	Pts
1	98	Ty Majeski	ThorSport Racing	Ford	10
2	18	Tyler Ankrum	McAnally-Hilgemann Racing	Chevrolet	9
3	7	Corey Day (i)	Spire Motorsports	Chevrolet	0
4	11	Corey Heim	Tricon Garage	Toyota	7
5	52	Stewart Friesen	Halmar Friesen Racing	Toyota	6
6	13	Jake Garcia	ThorSport Racing	Ford	5
7	07	Justin Haley (i)	Spire Motorsports	Chevrolet	0
8	38	Chandler Smith	Front Row Motorsports	Ford	3
9	17	Gio Ruggiero (R)	Tricon Garage	Toyota	2
10	71	Rajah Caruth	Spire Motorsports	Chevrolet	1

Stage 2 Laps: 30

Pos.	#	Driver	Team	Make	Pts
1	18	Tyler Ankrum	McAnally-Hilgemann Racing	Chevrolet	10
2	38	Chandler Smith	Front Row Motorsports	Ford	9
3	52	Stewart Friesen	Halmar Friesen Racing	Toyota	8
4	11	Corey Heim	Tricon Garage	Toyota	7
5	99	Ben Rhodes	ThorSport Racing	Ford	6
6	07	Justin Haley (i)	Spire Motorsports	Chevrolet	0
7	13	Jake Garcia	ThorSport Racing	Ford	4
8	71	Rajah Caruth	Spire Motorsports	Chevrolet	3
9	45	Kaden Honeycutt	Niece Motorsports	Chevrolet	2
10	7	Corey Day (i)	Spire Motorsports	Chevrolet	0

Stage 3 Laps: 74

Fin	St	#	Driver	Team	Make	Laps	Led	Status	Pts
1	16	11	Corey Heim	Tricon Garage	Toyota	134	42	Running	54
2	20	9	Grant Enfinger	CR7 Motorsports	Chevrolet	134	0	Running	35
3	18	15	Tanner Gray	Tricon Garage	Toyota	134	0	Running	34
4	7	98	Ty Majeski	ThorSport Racing	Ford	134	13	Running	44
5	23	34	Layne Riggs	Front Row Motorsports	Ford	134	5	Running	32
6	5	52	Stewart Friesen	Halmar Friesen Racing	Toyota	134	14	Running	45
7	6	71	Rajah Caruth	Spire Motorsports	Chevrolet	134	0	Running	34
8	17	38	Chandler Smith	Front Row Motorsports	Ford	134	1	Running	41
9	11	88	Matt Crafton	ThorSport Racing	Ford	134	0	Running	28
10	2	18	Tyler Ankrum	McAnally-Hilgemann Racing	Chevrolet	134	39	Running	46
11	4	07	Justin Haley (i)	Spire Motorsports	Chevrolet	134	1	Running	0
12	22	45	Kaden Honeycutt	Niece Motorsports	Chevrolet	134	0	Running	27
13	12	19	Daniel Hemric	McAnally-Hilgemann Racing	Chevrolet	134	0	Running	24
14	15	99	Ben Rhodes	ThorSport Racing	Ford	134	6	Running	29
15	8	17	Gio Ruggiero (R)	Tricon Garage	Toyota	134	0	Running	24
16	24	42	Matt Mills	Niece Motorsports	Chevrolet	134	0	Running	21
17	13	77	Andrés Pérez de Lara (R)	Spire Motorsports	Chevrolet	134	0	Running	20
18	19	44	Bayley Currey	Niece Motorsports	Chevrolet	134	0	Running	19
19	9	26	Dawson Sutton (R)	Rackley W.A.R.	Chevrolet	134	0	Running	18
20	10	81	Connor Mosack (R)	McAnally-Hilgemann Racing	Chevrolet	134	0	Running	17
21	27	5	Toni Breidinger (R)	Tricon Garage	Toyota	134	0	Running	16
22	25	1	William Sawalich (i)	Tricon Garage	Toyota	134	0	Running	0
23	26	66	Luke Fenhaus	ThorSport Racing	Ford	134	0	Running	14
24	29	33	Frankie Muniz (R)	Reaume Brothers Racing	Ford	133	0	Running	13
25	21	76	Spencer Boyd	Freedom Racing Enterprises	Chevrolet	133	1	Running	12
26	3	13	Jake Garcia	ThorSport Racing	Ford	132	1	Running	20
27	1	7	Corey Day (i)	Spire Motorsports	Chevrolet	132	2	Running	0
28	28	22	Josh Reaume	Reaume Brothers Racing	Ford	132	0	Running	9
29	31	02	Nathan Byrd	Young's Motorsports	Chevrolet	128	0	Running	8
30	14	91	Jack Wood	McAnally-Hilgemann Racing	Chevrolet	92	2	Accident	7
31	30	2	Stephen Mallozzi	Reaume Brothers Racing	Ford	17	0	Drivetrain	6
Official race results

== Standings after the race ==
Drivers' Championship standings

	Pos	Driver	Points
1	1	Ty Majeski	128
2	2	Corey Heim	123 (-5)
2	3	Grant Enfinger	120 (–8)
1	4	Chandler Smith	120 (–8)
2	5	Stewart Friesen	107 (–21)
1	6	Ben Rhodes	95 (–33)
7	7	Tyler Ankrum	87 (–41)
2	8	Gio Ruggiero	86 (–42)
1	9	Daniel Hemric	86 (–42)
2	10	Tanner Gray	77 (–51)
Official driver's standings

Manufacturers' Championship standings

Pos	Manufacturer	Points
1	Toyota	115
2	Chevrolet	108 (-7)
3	Ford	99 (–16)

- Note: Only the first 10 positions are included for the driver standings.

Previous race: 2025 Fr8 208	NASCAR Craftsman Truck Series; 2025 season	Next race: 2025 Baptist Health 200
