= 2025 MillerTech Battery 200 =

14th race of the 2025 NASCAR Craftsman Truck Series

Race details
- Race 14 of 25 of the 2025 NASCAR Craftsman Truck Series
- Date: June 20, 2025
- Location: Pocono Raceway in Long Pond, Pennsylvania
- Course: Permanent racing facility
- Course length: 2.5 miles (4.0 km)
- Distance: 80 laps, 200 mi (321 km)
- Scheduled distance: 80 laps, 200 mi (321 km)
- Average speed: 116.167 mph (186.953 km/h)

Pole position
| Driver | Layne Riggs | Front Row Motorsports |
- Time: 53.126

Most laps led
| Driver | Corey Heim | Tricon Garage |
- Laps: 48

Winner
| No. 34 | Layne Riggs | Front Row Motorsports |

Television in the United States
- Network: FS1
- Announcers: Jamie Little, Kevin Harvick, and Michael Waltrip

Radio in the United States
- Radio: MRN

The 2025 MillerTech Battery 200 was the 14th stock car race of the 2025 NASCAR Craftsman Truck Series, and the 16th iteration of the event. The race was held on Friday, June 20, 2025, at Pocono Raceway in Long Pond, Pennsylvania, a 2.5 miles (4.0 km) permanent triangular-shaped racetrack. The race took the scheduled 80 laps to complete.

Layne Riggs, driving for Front Row Motorsports, would take advantage of the leader's late mishaps, and led the final 20 laps of the race to earn his third career NASCAR Craftsman Truck Series win, and his first of the season. To fill out the podium, Tanner Gray, driving for Tricon Garage, and Kaden Honeycutt, driving for Niece Motorsports, would finish 2nd and 3rd, respectively.

Corey Heim would continue to put on a clinic performance, winning the second stage and leading a race-high 48 laps, before sustaining a flat tire with over 20 laps to go, forcing him to pit and lose the lead on the restart. With no more cautions occurring, Heim came home with a 23rd place finish. Carson Hocevar took over the second position, before receiving a restart violation for jumping before the leader. It was his second one of the season, which caused him to end his chances of winning. Hocevar rebounded to finish 13th.

== Report ==
=== Background ===
Pocono Raceway, the track where the race was held.

Pocono Raceway is a 2.5-mile (4.0 km) oval speedway located in Long Pond, Pennsylvania, which has hosted NASCAR racing annually since the early 1970s. Nicknamed "The Tricky Triangle", the speedway has three distinct corners and is known for high speeds along its lengthy straightaways.

From 1982 to 2019, the circuit had two race weekends. In 2020, the circuit was reduced to one race meeting of two races. The first race was moved to World Wide Technology Raceway near St. Louis starting in 2022.

==== Entry list ====
- (R) denotes rookie driver.
- (i) denotes driver who is ineligible for series driver points.

| # | Driver | Team | Make |
|---|---|---|---|
| 1 | Brandon Jones (i) | Tricon Garage | Toyota |
| 02 | Nathan Byrd | Young's Motorsports | Chevrolet |
| 2 | Cody Dennison | Reaume Brothers Racing | Ford |
| 5 | Toni Breidinger (R) | Tricon Garage | Toyota |
| 6 | Norm Benning | Norm Benning Racing | Chevrolet |
| 07 | Patrick Emerling | Spire Motorsports | Chevrolet |
| 7 | Carson Hocevar (i) | Spire Motorsports | Chevrolet |
| 9 | Grant Enfinger | CR7 Motorsports | Chevrolet |
| 11 | Corey Heim | Tricon Garage | Toyota |
| 13 | Jake Garcia | ThorSport Racing | Ford |
| 15 | Tanner Gray | Tricon Garage | Toyota |
| 17 | Gio Ruggiero (R) | Tricon Garage | Toyota |
| 18 | Tyler Ankrum | McAnally-Hilgemann Racing | Chevrolet |
| 19 | Daniel Hemric | McAnally-Hilgemann Racing | Chevrolet |
| 22 | Clayton Green | Reaume Brothers Racing | Ford |
| 26 | Dawson Sutton (R) | Rackley W.A.R. | Chevrolet |
| 28 | Bryan Dauzat | FDNY Racing | Chevrolet |
| 33 | Frankie Muniz (R) | Reaume Brothers Racing | Ford |
| 34 | Layne Riggs | Front Row Motorsports | Ford |
| 38 | Chandler Smith | Front Row Motorsports | Ford |
| 42 | Matt Mills | Niece Motorsports | Chevrolet |
| 44 | Conner Jones | Niece Motorsports | Chevrolet |
| 45 | Kaden Honeycutt | Niece Motorsports | Chevrolet |
| 52 | Stewart Friesen | Halmar Friesen Racing | Toyota |
| 66 | Luke Baldwin | ThorSport Racing | Ford |
| 69 | Tyler Tomassi (i) | MBM Motorsports | Ford |
| 71 | Rajah Caruth | Spire Motorsports | Chevrolet |
| 74 | Dawson Cram (i) | Mike Harmon Racing | Toyota |
| 76 | Spencer Boyd | Freedom Racing Enterprises | Chevrolet |
| 77 | Andrés Pérez de Lara (R) | Spire Motorsports | Chevrolet |
| 81 | Connor Mosack (R) | McAnally-Hilgemann Racing | Chevrolet |
| 88 | Matt Crafton | ThorSport Racing | Ford |
| 91 | Jack Wood | McAnally-Hilgemann Racing | Chevrolet |
| 98 | Ty Majeski | ThorSport Racing | Ford |
| 99 | Ben Rhodes | ThorSport Racing | Ford |
Official entry list

== Practice ==
For practice, drivers were separated into two groups, A and B. Both sessions were 25 minutes long, and was held on Friday, June 20, at 12:35 PM EST. Connor Mosack, driving for McAnally-Hilgemann Racing, would set the fastest time between both groups, with a lap of 54.594, and a speed of 164.853 mph (265.305 km/h).

| Pos. | # | Driver | Team | Make | Time | Speed |
|---|---|---|---|---|---|---|
| 1 | 81 | Connor Mosack (R) | McAnally-Hilgemann Racing | Chevrolet | 54.594 | 164.853 |
| 2 | 38 | Chandler Smith | Front Row Motorsports | Ford | 54.615 | 164.790 |
| 3 | 11 | Corey Heim | Tricon Garage | Toyota | 54.630 | 164.745 |
Full practice results

== Qualifying ==
Qualifying was held on Friday, June 20, at 1:40 PM EST. Standard intermediate track qualifying was in effect, although at Pocono, a hybrid road course qualifying rule was used. The timing line was set in the North Straight, exiting Turn 2, where cars exited pit road, drove two-thirds of a lap, then took the green flag at the timing line exiting Turn 2, and completing their lap there the next time by. Teams then immediately pitted the car, meaning only two laps were run. In addition, up to three trucks could be at the track at one time, separated by considerable intervals (about 20 seconds) to ensure drafting was prohibited.

Layne Riggs, driving for Front Row Motorsports, would score the pole for the race, with a lap of 53.126, and a speed of 169.409 mph (272.637 km/h).

No drivers would fail to qualify.

=== Qualifying results ===
| Pos. | # | Driver | Team | Make | Time | Speed |
|---|---|---|---|---|---|---|
| 1 | 34 | Layne Riggs | Front Row Motorsports | Ford | 53.126 | 169.409 |
| 2 | 45 | Kaden Honeycutt | Niece Motorsports | Chevrolet | 53.257 | 168.992 |
| 3 | 11 | Corey Heim | Tricon Garage | Toyota | 53.265 | 168.966 |
| 4 | 7 | Carson Hocevar (i) | Spire Motorsports | Chevrolet | 53.297 | 168.865 |
| 5 | 15 | Tanner Gray | Tricon Garage | Toyota | 53.319 | 168.795 |
| 6 | 17 | Gio Ruggiero (R) | Tricon Garage | Toyota | 53.339 | 168.732 |
| 7 | 77 | Andrés Pérez de Lara (R) | Spire Motorsports | Chevrolet | 53.353 | 168.688 |
| 8 | 71 | Rajah Caruth | Spire Motorsports | Chevrolet | 53.420 | 168.476 |
| 9 | 1 | Brandon Jones (i) | Tricon Garage | Toyota | 53.489 | 168.259 |
| 10 | 07 | Patrick Emerling | Spire Motorsports | Chevrolet | 53.577 | 167.983 |
| 11 | 13 | Jake Garcia | ThorSport Racing | Ford | 53.616 | 167.860 |
| 12 | 81 | Connor Mosack (R) | McAnally-Hilgemann Racing | Chevrolet | 53.617 | 167.857 |
| 13 | 52 | Stewart Friesen | Halmar Friesen Racing | Toyota | 53.625 | 167.832 |
| 14 | 9 | Grant Enfinger | CR7 Motorsports | Chevrolet | 53.628 | 167.823 |
| 15 | 38 | Chandler Smith | Front Row Motorsports | Ford | 53.734 | 167.492 |
| 16 | 98 | Ty Majeski | ThorSport Racing | Ford | 53.941 | 166.849 |
| 17 | 66 | Luke Baldwin | ThorSport Racing | Ford | 53.948 | 166.827 |
| 18 | 18 | Tyler Ankrum | McAnally-Hilgemann Racing | Chevrolet | 53.949 | 166.824 |
| 19 | 19 | Daniel Hemric | McAnally-Hilgemann Racing | Chevrolet | 54.035 | 166.559 |
| 20 | 88 | Matt Crafton | ThorSport Racing | Ford | 54.271 | 165.834 |
| 21 | 42 | Matt Mills | Niece Motorsports | Chevrolet | 54.886 | 163.976 |
| 22 | 44 | Conner Jones | Niece Motorsports | Chevrolet | 54.904 | 163.922 |
| 23 | 02 | Nathan Byrd | Young's Motorsports | Chevrolet | 55.315 | 162.705 |
| 24 | 91 | Jack Wood | McAnally-Hilgemann Racing | Chevrolet | 55.548 | 162.022 |
| 25 | 2 | Cody Dennison | Reaume Brothers Racing | Ford | 55.623 | 161.804 |
| 26 | 76 | Spencer Boyd | Freedom Racing Enterprises | Chevrolet | 55.884 | 161.048 |
| 27 | 33 | Frankie Muniz (R) | Reaume Brothers Racing | Ford | 56.383 | 159.623 |
| 28 | 69 | Tyler Tomassi (i) | MBM Motorsports | Ford | 56.612 | 158.977 |
| 29 | 5 | Toni Breidinger (R) | Tricon Garage | Toyota | 56.684 | 158.775 |
| 30 | 74 | Dawson Cram (i) | Mike Harmon Racing | Toyota | 59.603 | 150.999 |
| 31 | 6 | Norm Benning | Norm Benning Racing | Chevrolet | 1:00.981 | 147.587 |
Qualified by owner's points
| 32 | 28 | Bryan Dauzat | FDNY Racing | Chevrolet | 1:02.601 | 143.768 |
| 33 | 22 | Clayton Green | Reaume Brothers Racing | Ford | 1:20.143 | 112.299 |
| 34 | 99 | Ben Rhodes | ThorSport Racing | Ford | – | – |
| 35 | 26 | Dawson Sutton (R) | Rackley W.A.R. | Chevrolet | – | – |
Official qualifying results
Official starting lineup

== Race results ==
Stage 1 Laps: 20

| Pos. | # | Driver | Team | Make | Pts |
|---|---|---|---|---|---|
| 1 | 34 | Layne Riggs | Front Row Motorsports | Ford | 10 |
| 2 | 45 | Kaden Honeycutt | Niece Motorsports | Chevrolet | 9 |
| 3 | 81 | Connor Mosack (R) | McAnally-Hilgemann Racing | Chevrolet | 8 |
| 4 | 77 | Andrés Pérez de Lara (R) | Spire Motorsports | Chevrolet | 7 |
| 5 | 13 | Jake Garcia | ThorSport Racing | Ford | 6 |
| 6 | 52 | Stewart Friesen | Halmar Friesen Racing | Toyota | 5 |
| 7 | 1 | Brandon Jones (i) | Tricon Garage | Toyota | 0 |
| 8 | 38 | Chandler Smith | Front Row Motorsports | Ford | 3 |
| 9 | 18 | Tyler Ankrum | McAnally-Hilgemann Racing | Chevrolet | 2 |
| 10 | 99 | Ben Rhodes | ThorSport Racing | Ford | 1 |

Stage 2 Laps: 20

| Pos. | # | Driver | Team | Make | Pts |
|---|---|---|---|---|---|
| 1 | 11 | Corey Heim | Tricon Garage | Toyota | 10 |
| 2 | 7 | Carson Hocevar (i) | Spire Motorsports | Chevrolet | 0 |
| 3 | 34 | Layne Riggs | Front Row Motorsports | Ford | 8 |
| 4 | 13 | Jake Garcia | ThorSport Racing | Ford | 7 |
| 5 | 15 | Tanner Gray | Tricon Garage | Toyota | 6 |
| 6 | 45 | Kaden Honeycutt | Niece Motorsports | Chevrolet | 5 |
| 7 | 18 | Tyler Ankrum | McAnally-Hilgemann Racing | Chevrolet | 4 |
| 8 | 99 | Ben Rhodes | ThorSport Racing | Ford | 3 |
| 9 | 77 | Andrés Pérez de Lara (R) | Spire Motorsports | Chevrolet | 2 |
| 10 | 81 | Connor Mosack (R) | McAnally-Hilgemann Racing | Chevrolet | 1 |

Stage 3 Laps: 40

| Fin | St | # | Driver | Team | Make | Laps | Led | Status | Pts |
|---|---|---|---|---|---|---|---|---|---|
| 1 | 1 | 34 | Layne Riggs | Front Row Motorsports | Ford | 80 | 25 | Running | 59 |
| 2 | 5 | 15 | Tanner Gray | Tricon Garage | Toyota | 80 | 0 | Running | 41 |
| 3 | 2 | 45 | Kaden Honeycutt | Niece Motorsports | Chevrolet | 80 | 0 | Running | 48 |
| 4 | 9 | 1 | Brandon Jones (i) | Tricon Garage | Toyota | 80 | 0 | Running | 0 |
| 5 | 19 | 19 | Daniel Hemric | McAnally-Hilgemann Racing | Chevrolet | 80 | 0 | Running | 32 |
| 6 | 12 | 81 | Connor Mosack (R) | McAnally-Hilgemann Racing | Chevrolet | 80 | 0 | Running | 40 |
| 7 | 15 | 38 | Chandler Smith | Front Row Motorsports | Ford | 80 | 0 | Running | 33 |
| 8 | 13 | 52 | Stewart Friesen | Halmar Friesen Racing | Toyota | 80 | 4 | Running | 34 |
| 9 | 16 | 98 | Ty Majeski | ThorSport Racing | Ford | 80 | 0 | Running | 28 |
| 10 | 8 | 71 | Rajah Caruth | Spire Motorsports | Chevrolet | 80 | 3 | Running | 27 |
| 11 | 6 | 17 | Gio Ruggiero (R) | Tricon Garage | Toyota | 80 | 0 | Running | 26 |
| 12 | 17 | 66 | Luke Baldwin | ThorSport Racing | Ford | 80 | 0 | Running | 25 |
| 13 | 4 | 7 | Carson Hocevar (i) | Spire Motorsports | Chevrolet | 80 | 0 | Running | 0 |
| 14 | 24 | 91 | Jack Wood | McAnally-Hilgemann Racing | Chevrolet | 80 | 0 | Running | 23 |
| 15 | 10 | 07 | Patrick Emerling | Spire Motorsports | Chevrolet | 80 | 0 | Running | 22 |
| 16 | 7 | 77 | Andrés Pérez de Lara (R) | Spire Motorsports | Chevrolet | 80 | 0 | Running | 30 |
| 17 | 14 | 9 | Grant Enfinger | CR7 Motorsports | Chevrolet | 80 | 0 | Running | 20 |
| 18 | 34 | 99 | Ben Rhodes | ThorSport Racing | Ford | 80 | 0 | Running | 23 |
| 19 | 27 | 33 | Frankie Muniz (R) | Reaume Brothers Racing | Ford | 80 | 0 | Running | 18 |
| 20 | 21 | 42 | Matt Mills | Niece Motorsports | Chevrolet | 80 | 0 | Running | 17 |
| 21 | 23 | 02 | Nathan Byrd | Young's Motorsports | Chevrolet | 80 | 0 | Running | 16 |
| 22 | 29 | 5 | Toni Breidinger (R) | Tricon Garage | Toyota | 80 | 0 | Running | 15 |
| 23 | 3 | 11 | Corey Heim | Tricon Garage | Toyota | 80 | 48 | Running | 24 |
| 24 | 28 | 69 | Tyler Tomassi (i) | MBM Motorsports | Ford | 80 | 0 | Running | 0 |
| 25 | 26 | 76 | Spencer Boyd | Freedom Racing Enterprises | Chevrolet | 80 | 0 | Running | 12 |
| 26 | 18 | 18 | Tyler Ankrum | McAnally-Hilgemann Racing | Chevrolet | 78 | 0 | Running | 17 |
| 27 | 20 | 88 | Matt Crafton | ThorSport Racing | Ford | 78 | 0 | Running | 10 |
| 28 | 11 | 13 | Jake Garcia | ThorSport Racing | Ford | 76 | 0 | Running | 22 |
| 29 | 35 | 26 | Dawson Sutton (R) | Rackley W.A.R. | Chevrolet | 48 | 0 | DVP | 8 |
| 30 | 33 | 22 | Clayton Green | Reaume Brothers Racing | Ford | 47 | 0 | Accident | 7 |
| 31 | 22 | 44 | Conner Jones | Niece Motorsports | Chevrolet | 47 | 0 | Accident | 6 |
| 32 | 30 | 74 | Dawson Cram (i) | Mike Harmon Racing | Toyota | 33 | 0 | Clutch | 0 |
| 33 | 25 | 2 | Cody Dennison | Reaume Brothers Racing | Ford | 18 | 0 | Accident | 4 |
| 34 | 31 | 6 | Norm Benning | Norm Benning Racing | Chevrolet | 10 | 0 | Too Slow | 3 |
| 35 | 32 | 28 | Bryan Dauzat | FDNY Racing | Chevrolet | 9 | 0 | Too Slow | 2 |
Official race results

== Standings after the race ==
Drivers' Championship standings

| | Pos | Driver | Points |
|---|---|---|---|
| | 1 | Corey Heim | 629 |
| | 2 | Chandler Smith | 505 (–124) |
| | 3 | Daniel Hemric | 486 (–143) |
| 2 | 4 | Layne Riggs | 483 (–146) |
| 1 | 5 | Grant Enfinger | 461 (–168) |
| 1 | 6 | Kaden Honeycutt | 456 (–173) |
| 2 | 7 | Tyler Ankrum | 441 (–188) |
| | 8 | Ty Majeski | 421 (–208) |
| | 9 | Jake Garcia | 411 (–218) |
| | 10 | Stewart Friesen | 381 (–248) |
Official driver's standings

Manufacturers' Championship standings

| Pos | Manufacturer | Points |
|---|---|---|
| 1 | Chevrolet | 516 |
| 2 | Toyota | 497 (–19) |
| 3 | Ford | 485 (–31) |

- Note: Only the first 10 positions are included for the driver standings.

| Previous race: 2025 DQS Solutions & Staffing 250 | NASCAR Craftsman Truck Series; 2025 season | Next race: 2025 LiUNA! 150 |
