= 2025 SpeedyCash.com 250 =

8th race of the 2025 NASCAR Craftsman Truck Series

Race details
- Race 8 of 25 of the 2025 NASCAR Craftsman Truck Series
- Date: May 2, 2025
- Location: Texas Motor Speedway in Fort Worth, Texas
- Course: Permanent racing facility
- Course length: 1.5 miles (2.4 km)
- Distance: 174 laps, 261 mi (420 km)
- Scheduled distance: 167 laps, 250 mi (403 km)
- Average speed: 102.008 mph (164.166 km/h)

Pole position
Driver	Tyler Ankrum	McAnally-Hilgemann Racing
- Grid positions set by competition-based formula

Most laps led
Driver	Corey Heim	Tricon Garage
- Laps: 96

Winner
No. 11	Corey Heim	Tricon Garage

Television in the United States
- Network: FS1
- Announcers: Jamie Little, Joey Logano, and Michael Waltrip

Radio in the United States
- Radio: NRN

The 2025 SpeedyCash.com 250 was the 8th stock car race of the 2025 NASCAR Craftsman Truck Series, and the 27th iteration of the event. The race was held on Friday, May 2, 2025, at Texas Motor Speedway in Fort Worth, Texas, a 1.5 miles (2.4 km) permanent asphalt quad-oval shaped intermediate speedway. The race was originally scheduled to be contested over 167 laps, but was increased to 174 due to an overtime finish.

In a wreck-filled race with a dramatic double-overtime battle for the win, Corey Heim, driving for Tricon Garage, would survive a three-wide challenge for the lead from Daniel Hemric and Ben Rhodes, and held off the field to earn his 14th career NASCAR Craftsman Truck Series win, and his third of the season. Heim was also the most dominant driver of the race, winning the second stage and leading a race-high 96 laps. To fill out the podium, Hemric, driving for McAnally-Hilgemann Racing, and Rajah Caruth, driving for Spire Motorsports, would finish 2nd and 3rd, respectively.

== Report ==
=== Background ===
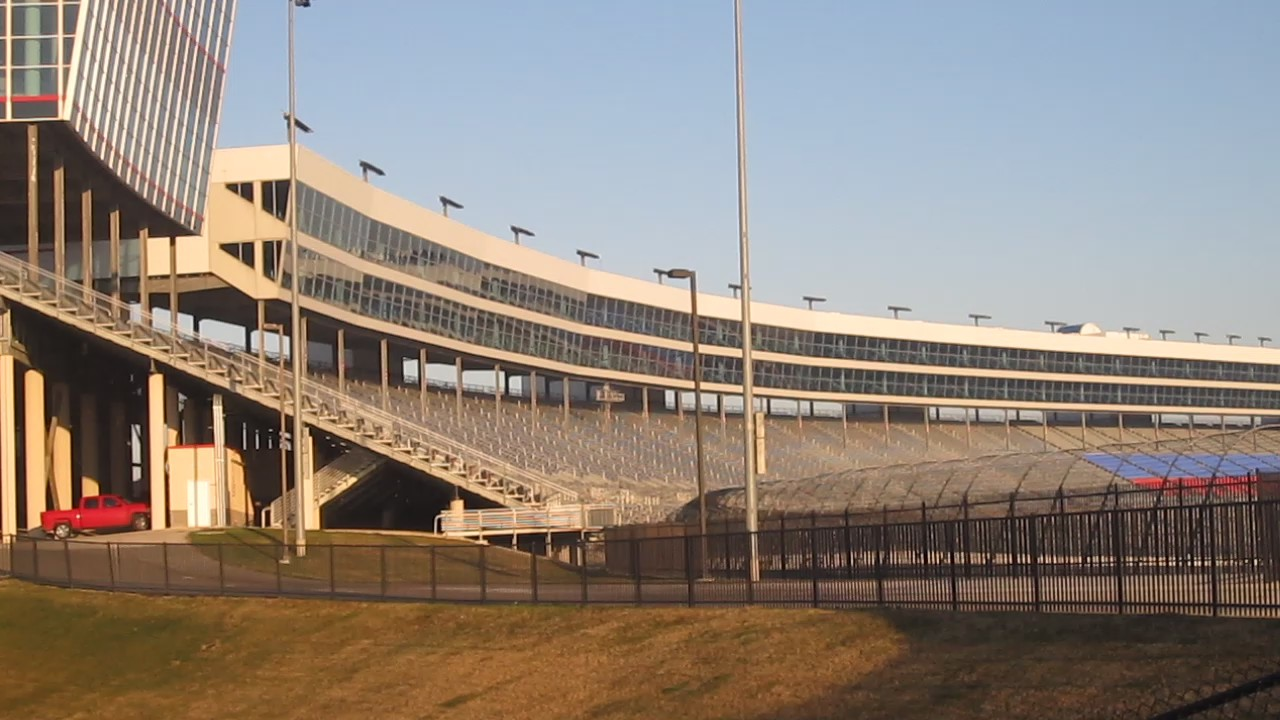
Texas Motor Speedway, the track where the race will be held.

Texas Motor Speedway is a speedway located in the northernmost portion of the U.S. city of Fort Worth, Texas – the portion located in Denton County, Texas. The track measures 1.5 miles (2.4 km) around and is banked 24 degrees in the turns, and is of the oval design, where the front straightaway juts outward slightly. The track layout is similar to Atlanta Motor Speedway and Charlotte Motor Speedway (formerly Lowe's Motor Speedway). The track is owned by Speedway Motorsports, Inc., the same company that owns Atlanta and Charlotte Motor Speedway, as well as the short-track Bristol Motor Speedway.

==== Entry list ====
- (R) denotes rookie driver.
- (i) denotes driver who is ineligible for series driver points.

#	Driver	Team	Make
1	Brandon Jones (i)	Tricon Garage	Toyota
02	Nathan Byrd	Young's Motorsports	Chevrolet
2	Cody Dennison	Reaume Brothers Racing	Ford
5	Toni Breidinger (R)	Tricon Garage	Toyota
07	Nick Sanchez (i)	Spire Motorsports	Chevrolet
7	Carson Hocevar (i)	Spire Motorsports	Chevrolet
9	Grant Enfinger	CR7 Motorsports	Chevrolet
11	Corey Heim	Tricon Garage	Toyota
13	Jake Garcia	ThorSport Racing	Ford
15	Tanner Gray	Tricon Garage	Toyota
17	Gio Ruggiero (R)	Tricon Garage	Toyota
18	Tyler Ankrum	McAnally-Hilgemann Racing	Chevrolet
19	Daniel Hemric	McAnally-Hilgemann Racing	Chevrolet
20	Stefan Parsons	Young's Motorsports	Chevrolet
22	Josh Reaume	Reaume Brothers Racing	Ford
26	Dawson Sutton (R)	Rackley W.A.R.	Chevrolet
33	Frankie Muniz (R)	Reaume Brothers Racing	Ford
34	Layne Riggs	Front Row Motorsports	Ford
38	Chandler Smith	Front Row Motorsports	Ford
42	Matt Mills	Niece Motorsports	Chevrolet
44	Bayley Currey	Niece Motorsports	Chevrolet
45	Kaden Honeycutt	Niece Motorsports	Chevrolet
52	Stewart Friesen	Halmar Friesen Racing	Toyota
66	Luke Fenhaus (R)	ThorSport Racing	Ford
71	Rajah Caruth	Spire Motorsports	Chevrolet
76	Spencer Boyd	Freedom Racing Enterprises	Chevrolet
77	Andrés Pérez de Lara (R)	Spire Motorsports	Chevrolet
81	Connor Mosack (R)	McAnally-Hilgemann Racing	Chevrolet
88	Matt Crafton	ThorSport Racing	Ford
91	Jack Wood	McAnally-Hilgemann Racing	Chevrolet
98	Ty Majeski	ThorSport Racing	Ford
99	Ben Rhodes	ThorSport Racing	Ford
Official entry list

== Starting lineup ==
Practice and qualifying were originally scheduled to be held on Friday, May 2, at 1:35 PM and 2:40 PM CST, but were both cancelled due to constant rain showers. The starting lineup would be determined by the metric system. As a result, Tyler Ankrum, driving for McAnally-Hilgemann Racing, will start on the pole.

No drivers would fail to qualify.

=== Starting lineup ===
Pos.	#	Driver	Team	Make
1	18	Tyler Ankrum	McAnally-Hilgemann Racing	Chevrolet
2	19	Daniel Hemric	McAnally-Hilgemann Racing	Chevrolet
3	13	Jake Garcia	ThorSport Racing	Ford
4	11	Corey Heim	Tricon Garage	Toyota
5	9	Grant Enfinger	CR7 Motorsports	Chevrolet
6	45	Kaden Honeycutt	Niece Motorsports	Chevrolet
7	71	Rajah Caruth	Spire Motorsports	Chevrolet
8	34	Layne Riggs	Front Row Motorsports	Ford
9	38	Chandler Smith	Front Row Motorsports	Ford
10	91	Jack Wood	McAnally-Hilgemann Racing	Chevrolet
11	17	Gio Ruggiero (R)	Tricon Garage	Toyota
12	81	Connor Mosack (R)	McAnally-Hilgemann Racing	Chevrolet
13	07	Nick Sanchez (i)	Spire Motorsports	Chevrolet
14	77	Andrés Pérez de Lara (R)	Spire Motorsports	Chevrolet
15	1	Brandon Jones (i)	Tricon Garage	Toyota
16	76	Spencer Boyd	Freedom Racing Enterprises	Chevrolet
17	44	Bayley Currey	Niece Motorsports	Chevrolet
18	02	Nathan Byrd	Young's Motorsports	Chevrolet
19	7	Carson Hocevar (i)	Spire Motorsports	Chevrolet
20	26	Dawson Sutton (R)	Rackley W.A.R.	Chevrolet
21	5	Toni Breidinger (R)	Tricon Garage	Toyota
22	88	Matt Crafton	ThorSport Racing	Ford
23	52	Stewart Friesen	Halmar Friesen Racing	Toyota
24	98	Ty Majeski	ThorSport Racing	Ford
25	15	Tanner Gray	Tricon Garage	Toyota
26	33	Frankie Muniz (R)	Reaume Brothers Racing	Ford
27	66	Luke Fenhaus (R)	ThorSport Racing	Ford
28	99	Ben Rhodes	ThorSport Racing	Ford
29	22	Josh Reaume	Reaume Brothers Racing	Ford
30	42	Matt Mills	Niece Motorsports	Chevrolet
31	2	Cody Dennison	Reaume Brothers Racing	Ford
32	20	Stefan Parsons	Young's Motorsports	Chevrolet
Official starting lineup

== Race results ==
Stage 1 Laps: 40

Pos.	#	Driver	Team	Make	Pts
1	9	Grant Enfinger	CR7 Motorsports	Chevrolet	10
2	42	Matt Mills	Niece Motorsports	Chevrolet	9
3	88	Matt Crafton	ThorSport Racing	Ford	8
4	19	Daniel Hemric	McAnally-Hilgemann Racing	Chevrolet	7
5	11	Corey Heim	Tricon Garage	Toyota	6
6	98	Ty Majeski	ThorSport Racing	Ford	5
7	15	Tanner Gray	Tricon Garage	Toyota	4
8	7	Carson Hocevar (i)	Spire Motorsports	Chevrolet	0
9	38	Chandler Smith	Front Row Motorsports	Ford	2
10	34	Layne Riggs	Front Row Motorsports	Ford	1

Stage 2 Laps: 40

Pos.	#	Driver	Team	Make	Pts
1	11	Corey Heim	Tricon Garage	Toyota	10
2	38	Chandler Smith	Front Row Motorsports	Ford	9
3	9	Grant Enfinger	CR7 Motorsports	Chevrolet	8
4	19	Daniel Hemric	McAnally-Hilgemann Racing	Chevrolet	7
5	52	Stewart Friesen	Halmar Friesen Racing	Toyota	6
6	99	Ben Rhodes	ThorSport Racing	Ford	5
7	13	Jake Garcia	ThorSport Racing	Ford	4
8	18	Tyler Ankrum	McAnally-Hilgemann Racing	Chevrolet	3
9	98	Ty Majeski	ThorSport Racing	Ford	2
10	88	Matt Crafton	ThorSport Racing	Ford	1

Stage 3 Laps: 94

Fin	St	#	Driver	Team	Make	Laps	Led	Status	Pts
1	4	11	Corey Heim	Tricon Garage	Toyota	174	96	Running	56
2	2	19	Daniel Hemric	McAnally-Hilgemann Racing	Chevrolet	174	0	Running	49
3	7	71	Rajah Caruth	Spire Motorsports	Chevrolet	174	5	Running	34
4	1	18	Tyler Ankrum	McAnally-Hilgemann Racing	Chevrolet	174	24	Running	36
5	25	15	Tanner Gray	Tricon Garage	Toyota	174	0	Running	36
6	28	99	Ben Rhodes	ThorSport Racing	Ford	174	2	Running	36
7	22	88	Matt Crafton	ThorSport Racing	Ford	174	3	Running	39
8	17	44	Bayley Currey	Niece Motorsports	Chevrolet	174	0	Running	29
9	20	26	Dawson Sutton (R)	Rackley W.A.R.	Chevrolet	174	0	Running	28
10	24	98	Ty Majeski	ThorSport Racing	Ford	174	12	Running	34
11	10	91	Jack Wood	McAnally-Hilgemann Racing	Chevrolet	174	0	Running	26
12	32	20	Stefan Parsons	Young's Motorsports	Chevrolet	174	0	Running	25
13	13	07	Nick Sanchez (i)	Spire Motorsports	Chevrolet	174	0	Running	0
14	18	02	Nathan Byrd	Young's Motorsports	Chevrolet	174	0	Running	23
15	16	76	Spencer Boyd	Freedom Racing Enterprises	Chevrolet	174	0	Running	22
16	9	38	Chandler Smith	Front Row Motorsports	Ford	174	0	Running	32
17	19	7	Carson Hocevar (i)	Spire Motorsports	Chevrolet	172	0	Running	0
18	29	22	Josh Reaume	Reaume Brothers Racing	Ford	172	0	Running	19
19	31	2	Cody Dennison	Reaume Brothers Racing	Ford	171	0	Running	18
20	30	42	Matt Mills	Niece Motorsports	Chevrolet	168	0	Accident	26
21	3	13	Jake Garcia	ThorSport Racing	Ford	164	3	Accident	20
22	12	81	Connor Mosack (R)	McAnally-Hilgemann Racing	Chevrolet	162	0	Accident	15
23	5	9	Grant Enfinger	CR7 Motorsports	Chevrolet	156	19	Accident	32
24	23	52	Stewart Friesen	Halmar Friesen Racing	Toyota	155	0	Accident	19
25	26	33	Frankie Muniz (R)	Reaume Brothers Racing	Ford	145	0	Accident	12
26	21	5	Toni Breidinger (R)	Tricon Garage	Toyota	120	0	Electrical	11
27	27	66	Luke Fenhaus (R)	ThorSport Racing	Ford	68	0	DVP	10
28	8	34	Layne Riggs	Front Row Motorsports	Ford	64	10	Accident	10
29	14	77	Andrés Pérez de Lara (R)	Spire Motorsports	Chevrolet	56	0	Accident	8
30	15	1	Brandon Jones (i)	Tricon Garage	Toyota	31	0	Accident	0
31	11	17	Gio Ruggiero (R)	Tricon Garage	Toyota	30	0	Accident	6
32	6	45	Kaden Honeycutt	Niece Motorsports	Chevrolet	30	0	Accident	5
Official race results

== Standings after the race ==
Drivers' Championship standings

	Pos	Driver	Points
	1	Corey Heim	368
	2	Chandler Smith	322 (-46)
1	3	Daniel Hemric	288 (–80)
1	4	Tyler Ankrum	286 (–82)
1	5	Ty Majeski	262 (–106)
2	6	Grant Enfinger	250 (–118)
	7	Jake Garcia	244 (–124)
3	8	Layne Riggs	242 (–126)
	9	Kaden Honeycutt	220 (–148)
2	10	Ben Rhodes	215 (–153)
Official driver's standings

Manufacturers' Championship standings

Pos	Manufacturer	Points
1	Chevrolet	298
2	Toyota	283 (-15)
3	Ford	274 (–24)

- Note: Only the first 10 positions are included for the driver standings.

Previous race: 2025 Black's Tire 200	NASCAR Craftsman Truck Series; 2025 season	Next race: 2025 Heart of Health Care 200
