= 2026 Craftsman 200 =

NASCAR Craftsman Truck Series race at Homestead–Miami Speedway

Race details
- Race 25 of 25 in the 2026 NASCAR Craftsman Truck Series
- Date: November 6, 2026
- Location: Homestead–Miami Speedway in Homestead, Florida
- Course: Permanent racing facility
- Course length: 1.5 miles (2.4 km)
- Distance: 134 laps, 201 mi (323.478 km)
- Average speed: 114.730 miles per hour (184.640 km/h)

Pole position
| Driver | Nick Sanchez | Spire Motorsports |
- Time: 32.756

Most laps led
| Driver | Christian Eckes | McAnally–Hilgemann Racing |
- Laps: 46

Fastest lap
| Driver | Nick Sanchez | Spire Motorsports |
- Time: 33.306

Winner
| No. 11 | Kaden Honeycutt | Tricon Garage |

Television in the United States
- Network: FS1
- Announcers: Jamie Little, Michael Waltrip, and Regan Smith

Radio in the United States
- Radio: NRN
- Booth announcers: Alex Hayden and Mike Bagley
- Turn announcers: Dave Moody (1 & 2) and Kyle Rickey (3 & 4)

The 2026 Craftsman 200 was a NASCAR Craftsman Truck Series race held on Friday, November 6, 2026, at Homestead–Miami Speedway in Homestead, Florida. Contested over 134 laps on the 1.5 mile (2.4 km) oval, it was the 25th and final race of the 2026 NASCAR Craftsman Truck Series season, the final race in the NASCAR Chase, and the 30th running of the event.

After a disastrous day for championship contender Layne Riggs, Kaden Honeycutt, driving for Tricon Garage, pulled off a solid performance, taking the lead from Christian Eckes with 13 laps to go, and led the remaining laps to earn his fifth career NASCAR Craftsman Truck Series win, and his fifth of the season, clinching his first Truck Series championship. Corey Heim swept both stages, while Eckes led the race-high 46 laps. At race's end, Eckes finished second, and Daniel Hemric finished third. Ty Majeski and Stewart Friesen rounded out the top five, while Heim, Chandler Smith, Jake Garcia, Grant Enfinger, and Corey LaJoie rounded out the top ten.

Riggs started fourth and made contact with pole-sitter Nick Sanchez on lap two, causing his tire to go down a few laps later. Riggs had continuous issues with flat tires throughout the rest of the race, and ended up finishing 32nd, six laps down.

This was also the final race with Craftsman as the title sponsor. Starting in 2027, FedEx Freight will serve as the new series sponsor.

== Report ==
=== Background ===
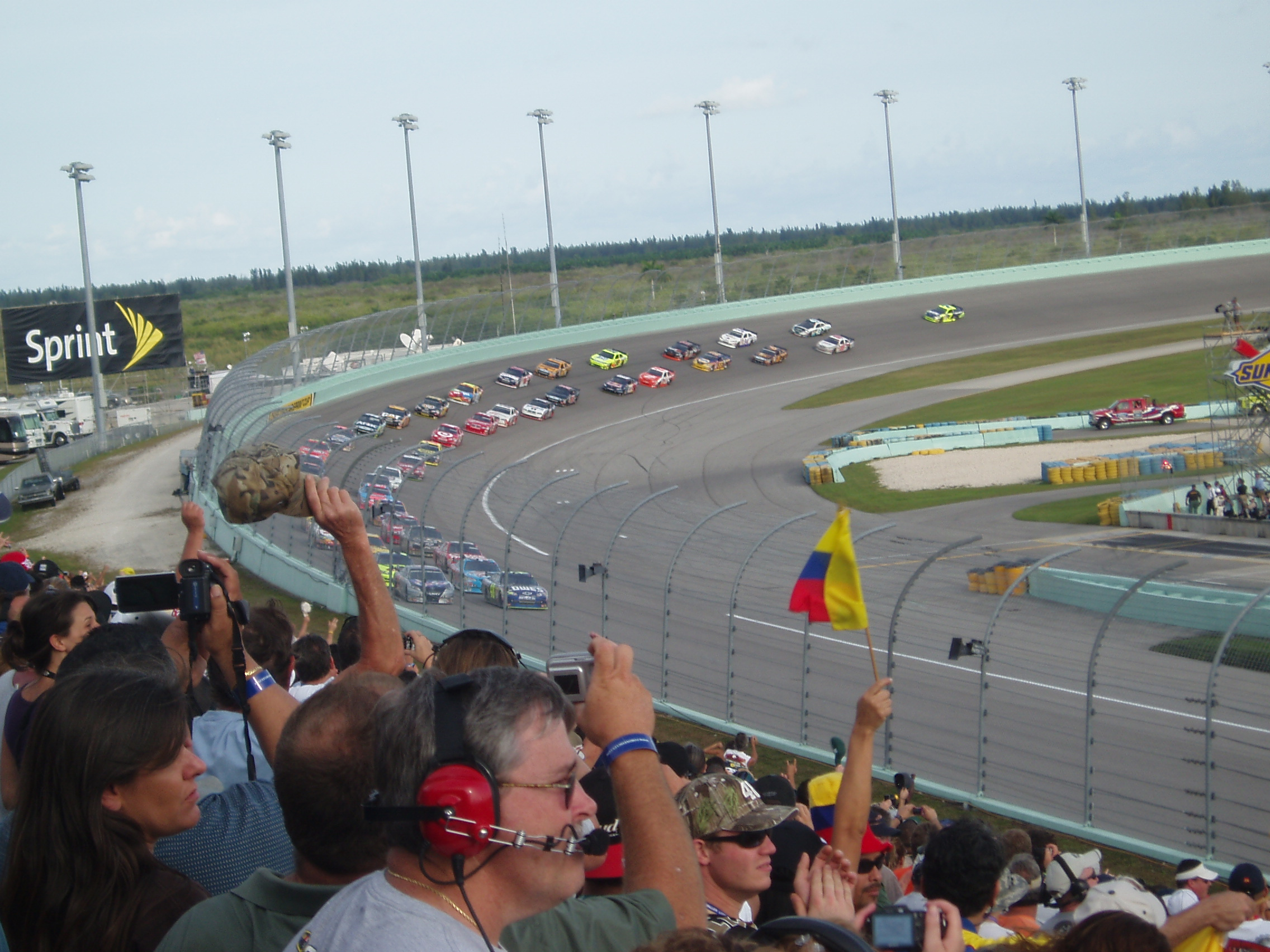
Homestead–Miami Speedway, the track where the race will be held.

Homestead–Miami Speedway is a motor racing track located in Homestead, Florida. The track, which has several configurations, has promoted several series of racing, including NASCAR, the NTT IndyCar Series and the Grand-Am Rolex Sports Car Series.

From 2002 to 2019, as well as 2026, Homestead-Miami Speedway has hosted the final race of the season in all three of NASCAR's series: the NASCAR Cup Series, O'Reilly Auto Parts Series and Craftsman Truck Series.

==== Championship eligible drivers ====
- Kaden Honeycutt, the No. 2 seed and current points leader, winning at Kansas and Phoenix during The Chase.
- Layne Riggs, the No. 1 seed, winning at Charlotte during The Chase. He entered 20-points behind Honeycutt.

==== Entry list ====
- (R) denotes rookie driver.
- (CC) denotes chase contender.
- (OC) denotes owners' chase contender truck.

| # | Driver | Team | Make |
|---|---|---|---|
| 1 | Corey Heim (OC) | Tricon Garage | Toyota |
| 2 | Timmy Hill | Team Reaume | Ford |
| 4 | Connor Hall | Niece Motorsports | Chevrolet |
| 5 | Spencer Davis | Tricon Garage | Toyota |
| 7 | Connor Mosack (OC) | Spire Motorsports | Chevrolet |
| 9 | Grant Enfinger (CC) | CR7 Motorsports | Chevrolet |
| 10 | Corey LaJoie | Kaulig Racing | Ram |
| 11 | Kaden Honeycutt (CC) | Tricon Garage | Toyota |
| 12 | Brenden Queen (R) | Kaulig Racing | Ram |
| 13 | Cole Butcher (R) | ThorSport Racing | Ford |
| 14 | Mini Tyrrell (R) | Kaulig Racing | Ram |
| 15 | Tanner Gray | Tricon Garage | Toyota |
| 16 | Justin Haley | Kaulig Racing | Ram |
| 17 | Gio Ruggiero (CC) | Tricon Garage | Toyota |
| 18 | Tyler Ankrum (CC) | McAnally–Hilgemann Racing | Chevrolet |
| 19 | Daniel Hemric (CC) | McAnally–Hilgemann Racing | Chevrolet |
| 20 | Mason Massey | McAnally–Hilgemann Racing | Chevrolet |
| 22 | Clayton Green | Team Reaume | Ford |
| 25 | Parker Kligerman | Kaulig Racing | Ram |
| 33 | Frankie Muniz | Team Reaume | Ford |
| 34 | Layne Riggs (CC) | Front Row Motorsports | Ford |
| 38 | Chandler Smith (CC) | Front Row Motorsports | Ford |
| 42 | Tyler Reif | Niece Motorsports | Chevrolet |
| 44 | Andrés Pérez de Lara | Niece Motorsports | Chevrolet |
| 45 | Landen Lewis (OC) | Niece Motorsports | Chevrolet |
| 52 | Stewart Friesen | Halmar Friesen Racing | Toyota |
| 62 | Leland Honeyman | Halmar Friesen Racing | Toyota |
| 66 | Matt Crafton | ThorSport Racing | Ford |
| 76 | Spencer Boyd | Freedom Racing Enterprises | Chevrolet |
| 77 | Nick Sanchez (OC) | Spire Motorsports | Chevrolet |
| 81 | Kris Wright | McAnally–Hilgemann Racing | Chevrolet |
| 88 | Ty Majeski (CC) | ThorSport Racing | Ford |
| 91 | Christian Eckes (CC) | McAnally–Hilgemann Racing | Chevrolet |
| 98 | Jake Garcia | ThorSport Racing | Ford |
| 99 | Ben Rhodes (CC) | ThorSport Racing | Ford |
Official entry list

== Practice ==
The first and only practice session was held on Thursday, November 5, at 6:30 PM EST, and lasted for 50 minutes.

Ty Majeski, driving for ThorSport Racing, set the fastest time in the session, with a lap of 32.426 seconds, and a speed of 166.533 miles per hour (268.009 km/h).

| Pos. | # | Driver | Team | Make | Time | Speed |
|---|---|---|---|---|---|---|
| 1 | 88 | Ty Majeski (CC) | ThorSport Racing | Ford | 32.426 | 166.533 |
| 2 | 98 | Jake Garcia | ThorSport Racing | Ford | 32.620 | 165.543 |
| 3 | 77 | Nick Sanchez (OC) | Spire Motorsports | Chevrolet | 32.790 | 164.684 |
Full practice results

== Qualifying ==
Qualifying was held on Friday, November 6, at 2:30 PM EST. Since Homestead–Miami Speedway is an intermediate racetrack, the qualifying procedure used was a single-car, one-lap system with one round. Drivers were on track by themselves and had one lap to post a qualifying time, and whoever set the fastest time won the pole.

Nick Sanchez, driving for Spire Motorsports, qualified on pole position with a lap of 32.756 seconds, and a speed of 164.855 miles per hour (265.308 km/h).

No drivers failed to qualify.

=== Qualifying results ===
| Pos. | # | Driver | Team | Make | Time | Speed |
|---|---|---|---|---|---|---|
| 1 | 77 | Nick Sanchez (OC) | Spire Motorsports | Chevrolet | 32.756 | 164.855 |
| 2 | 38 | Chandler Smith (CC) | Front Row Motorsports | Ford | 32.842 | 164.424 |
| 3 | 1 | Corey Heim (OC) | Tricon Garage | Toyota | 32.878 | 164.244 |
| 4 | 34 | Layne Riggs (CC) | Front Row Motorsports | Ford | 32.882 | 164.224 |
| 5 | 11 | Kaden Honeycutt (CC) | Tricon Garage | Toyota | 32.963 | 163.820 |
| 6 | 52 | Stewart Friesen | Halmar Friesen Racing | Toyota | 32.991 | 163.681 |
| 7 | 17 | Gio Ruggiero (CC) | Tricon Garage | Toyota | 32.992 | 163.676 |
| 8 | 15 | Tanner Gray | Tricon Garage | Toyota | 33.047 | 163.404 |
| 9 | 7 | Connor Mosack (OC) | Spire Motorsports | Chevrolet | 33.080 | 163.241 |
| 10 | 88 | Ty Majeski (CC) | ThorSport Racing | Ford | 33.150 | 162.896 |
| 11 | 62 | Leland Honeyman | Halmar Friesen Racing | Toyota | 33.164 | 162.827 |
| 12 | 4 | Connor Hall | Niece Motorsports | Chevrolet | 33.164 | 162.827 |
| 13 | 9 | Grant Enfinger (CC) | CR7 Motorsports | Chevrolet | 33.178 | 162.758 |
| 14 | 45 | Landen Lewis (OC) | Niece Motorsports | Chevrolet | 33.200 | 162.651 |
| 15 | 13 | Cole Butcher (R) | ThorSport Racing | Ford | 33.221 | 162.548 |
| 16 | 19 | Daniel Hemric (CC) | McAnally–Hilgemann Racing | Chevrolet | 33.241 | 162.450 |
| 17 | 91 | Christian Eckes (CC) | McAnally–Hilgemann Racing | Chevrolet | 33.311 | 162.109 |
| 18 | 18 | Tyler Ankrum (CC) | McAnally–Hilgemann Racing | Chevrolet | 33.390 | 161.725 |
| 19 | 16 | Justin Haley | Kaulig Racing | Ram | 33.413 | 161.614 |
| 20 | 99 | Ben Rhodes (CC) | ThorSport Racing | Ford | 33.432 | 161.522 |
| 21 | 12 | Brenden Queen (R) | Kaulig Racing | Ram | 33.536 | 161.021 |
| 22 | 44 | Andrés Pérez de Lara | Niece Motorsports | Chevrolet | 33.550 | 160.954 |
| 23 | 25 | Parker Kligerman | Kaulig Racing | Ram | 33.580 | 160.810 |
| 24 | 98 | Jake Garcia | ThorSport Racing | Ford | 33.597 | 160.729 |
| 25 | 42 | Tyler Reif | Niece Motorsports | Chevrolet | 33.680 | 160.333 |
| 26 | 10 | Corey LaJoie | Kaulig Racing | Ram | 33.773 | 159.891 |
| 27 | 2 | Timmy Hill | Team Reaume | Ford | 33.776 | 159.877 |
| 28 | 66 | Matt Crafton | ThorSport Racing | Ford | 33.830 | 159.622 |
| 29 | 81 | Kris Wright | McAnally–Hilgemann Racing | Chevrolet | 33.836 | 159.593 |
| 30 | 5 | Spencer Davis | Tricon Garage | Toyota | 33.895 | 159.316 |
| 31 | 14 | Mini Tyrrell (R) | Kaulig Racing | Ram | 33.954 | 159.039 |
Qualified by owner's points
| 32 | 20 | Mason Massey | McAnally–Hilgemann Racing | Chevrolet | 33.966 | 158.983 |
| 33 | 33 | Frankie Muniz | Team Reaume | Ford | 34.026 | 158.702 |
| 34 | 22 | Clayton Green | Team Reaume | Ford | 34.192 | 157.932 |
| 35 | 76 | Spencer Boyd | Freedom Racing Enterprises | Chevrolet | 35.248 | 153.200 |
Official qualifying results
Official starting lineup

== Race ==
=== Race results ===
==== Stage Results ====
Stage One Laps: 30

| Pos. | # | Driver | Team | Make | Pts |
|---|---|---|---|---|---|
| 1 | 1 | Corey Heim (OC) | Tricon Garage | Toyota | 10 |
| 2 | 77 | Nick Sanchez (OC) | Spire Motorsports | Chevrolet | 9 |
| 3 | 11 | Kaden Honeycutt (CC) | Tricon Garage | Toyota | 8 |
| 4 | 19 | Daniel Hemric (CC) | McAnally–Hilgemann Racing | Chevrolet | 7 |
| 5 | 38 | Chandler Smith (CC) | Front Row Motorsports | Ford | 6 |
| 6 | 88 | Ty Majeski (CC) | ThorSport Racing | Ford | 5 |
| 7 | 9 | Grant Enfinger (CC) | CR7 Motorsports | Chevrolet | 4 |
| 8 | 91 | Christian Eckes (CC) | McAnally–Hilgemann Racing | Chevrolet | 3 |
| 9 | 52 | Stewart Friesen | Halmar Friesen Racing | Toyota | 2 |
| 10 | 98 | Jake Garcia | ThorSport Racing | Ford | 1 |

Stage Two Laps: 30

| Pos. | # | Driver | Team | Make | Pts |
|---|---|---|---|---|---|
| 1 | 1 | Corey Heim (OC) | Tricon Garage | Toyota | 10 |
| 2 | 19 | Daniel Hemric (CC) | McAnally–Hilgemann Racing | Chevrolet | 9 |
| 3 | 77 | Nick Sanchez (OC) | Spire Motorsports | Chevrolet | 8 |
| 4 | 91 | Christian Eckes (CC) | McAnally–Hilgemann Racing | Chevrolet | 7 |
| 5 | 88 | Ty Majeski (CC) | ThorSport Racing | Ford | 6 |
| 6 | 11 | Kaden Honeycutt (CC) | Tricon Garage | Toyota | 5 |
| 7 | 38 | Chandler Smith (CC) | Front Row Motorsports | Ford | 4 |
| 8 | 52 | Stewart Friesen | Halmar Friesen Racing | Toyota | 3 |
| 9 | 17 | Gio Ruggiero (CC) | Tricon Garage | Toyota | 2 |
| 10 | 15 | Tanner Gray | Tricon Garage | Toyota | 1 |

=== Final Stage Results ===
Stage Three Laps: 74

| Fin | St | # | Driver | Team | Make | Laps | Led | Status | Pts |
|---|---|---|---|---|---|---|---|---|---|
| 1 | 5 | 11 | Kaden Honeycutt (CC) | Tricon Garage | Toyota | 134 | 15 | Running | 68 |
| 2 | 17 | 91 | Christian Eckes (CC) | McAnally–Hilgemann Racing | Chevrolet | 134 | 46 | Running | 45 |
| 3 | 16 | 19 | Daniel Hemric (CC) | McAnally–Hilgemann Racing | Chevrolet | 134 | 8 | Running | 50 |
| 4 | 10 | 88 | Ty Majeski (CC) | ThorSport Racing | Ford | 134 | 0 | Running | 44 |
| 5 | 6 | 52 | Stewart Friesen | Halmar Friesen Racing | Toyota | 134 | 0 | Running | 37 |
| 6 | 3 | 1 | Corey Heim (OC) | Tricon Garage | Toyota | 134 | 45 | Running | 51 |
| 7 | 2 | 38 | Chandler Smith (CC) | Front Row Motorsports | Ford | 134 | 3 | Running | 40 |
| 8 | 24 | 98 | Jake Garcia | ThorSport Racing | Ford | 134 | 0 | Running | 30 |
| 9 | 13 | 9 | Grant Enfinger (CC) | CR7 Motorsports | Chevrolet | 134 | 0 | Running | 32 |
| 10 | 26 | 10 | Corey LaJoie | Kaulig Racing | Ram | 134 | 0 | Running | 27 |
| 11 | 7 | 17 | Gio Ruggiero (CC) | Tricon Garage | Toyota | 134 | 1 | Running | 28 |
| 12 | 32 | 20 | Mason Massey | McAnally–Hilgemann Racing | Chevrolet | 134 | 0 | Running | 25 |
| 13 | 20 | 99 | Ben Rhodes (CC) | ThorSport Racing | Ford | 134 | 0 | Running | 24 |
| 14 | 14 | 45 | Landen Lewis (OC) | Niece Motorsports | Chevrolet | 134 | 0 | Running | 23 |
| 15 | 23 | 25 | Parker Kligerman | Kaulig Racing | Ram | 134 | 0 | Running | 22 |
| 16 | 9 | 7 | Connor Mosack (OC) | Spire Motorsports | Chevrolet | 134 | 5 | Running | 21 |
| 17 | 27 | 2 | Timmy Hill | Team Reaume | Ford | 134 | 0 | Running | 20 |
| 18 | 12 | 4 | Connor Hall | Niece Motorsports | Chevrolet | 134 | 0 | Running | 19 |
| 19 | 19 | 16 | Justin Haley | Kaulig Racing | Ram | 134 | 0 | Running | 18 |
| 20 | 21 | 12 | Brenden Queen (R) | Kaulig Racing | Ram | 134 | 0 | Running | 17 |
| 21 | 25 | 42 | Tyler Reif | Niece Motorsports | Chevrolet | 134 | 0 | Running | 16 |
| 22 | 15 | 13 | Cole Butcher (R) | ThorSport Racing | Ford | 134 | 1 | Running | 15 |
| 23 | 31 | 14 | Mini Tyrrell (R) | Kaulig Racing | Ram | 134 | 0 | Running | 14 |
| 24 | 29 | 81 | Kris Wright | McAnally–Hilgemann Racing | Chevrolet | 134 | 0 | Running | 13 |
| 25 | 28 | 66 | Matt Crafton | ThorSport Racing | Ford | 134 | 0 | Running | 12 |
| 26 | 30 | 5 | Spencer Davis | Tricon Garage | Toyota | 134 | 0 | Running | 11 |
| 27 | 8 | 15 | Tanner Gray | Tricon Garage | Toyota | 134 | 0 | Running | 11 |
| 28 | 33 | 33 | Frankie Muniz | Team Reaume | Ford | 133 | 0 | Running | 9 |
| 29 | 11 | 62 | Leland Honeyman | Halmar Friesen Racing | Toyota | 133 | 0 | Running | 8 |
| 30 | 35 | 76 | Spencer Boyd | Freedom Racing Enterprises | Chevrolet | 132 | 0 | Running | 7 |
| 31 | 34 | 22 | Clayton Green | Team Reaume | Ford | 131 | 0 | Running | 6 |
| 32 | 4 | 34 | Layne Riggs (CC) | Front Row Motorsports | Ford | 128 | 0 | Running | 5 |
| 33 | 22 | 44 | Andrés Pérez de Lara | Niece Motorsports | Chevrolet | 115 | 0 | Accident | 4 |
| 34 | 18 | 18 | Tyler Ankrum (CC) | McAnally–Hilgemann Racing | Chevrolet | 115 | 0 | Accident | 3 |
| 35 | 1 | 77 | Nick Sanchez (OC) | Spire Motorsports | Chevrolet | 104 | 10 | Driveshaft | 20 |
Official race results

=== Race statistics ===
- Lead changes: 20 among 9 different drivers
- Cautions/Laps: 4 for 25 laps
- Red flags: 0
- Time of race: 1 hour, 45 minutes and 7 seconds
- Average speed: 114.730 miles per hour (184.640 km/h)

== Standings after the race ==
Drivers' Championship standings

| | Pos | Driver | Points |
|---|---|---|---|
| | 1 | Kaden Honeycutt | 2,471 |
| | 2 | Layne Riggs | 2,388 (–83) |
| | 3 | Chandler Smith | 2,340 (–131) |
| | 4 | Ty Majeski | 2,319 (–152) |
| | 5 | Christian Eckes | 2,308 (–163) |
| | 6 | Gio Ruggiero | 2,252 (–219) |
| 1 | 7 | Daniel Hemric | 2,249 (–222) |
| 1 | 8 | Ben Rhodes | 2,241 (–230) |
| 1 | 9 | Grant Enfinger | 2,210 (–261) |
| 1 | 10 | Tyler Ankrum | 2,196 (–275) |
Official driver's standings

Manufacturers' Championship standings

| Pos | Manufacturer | Points |
|---|---|---|
| 1 | Ford | 1,053 |
| 2 | Toyota | 1,023 (–30) |
| 3 | Chevrolet | 952 (–101) |
| 4 | Ram | 647 (–406) |

- Note: Only the first 10 positions are included for the driver standings.

| Previous race: 2026 Black's Tire 200 (Martinsville) | NASCAR Craftsman Truck Series; 2026 season | Next race: 2027 Fresh From Florida 250 |
