= 2025 TSport 200 =

16th race of the 2025 NASCAR Craftsman Truck Series

Race details
- Race 16 of 25 of the 2025 NASCAR Craftsman Truck Series
- Date: July 25, 2025
- Official name: 4th Annual TSport 200
- Location: Lucas Oil Indianapolis Raceway Park in Brownsburg, Indiana
- Course: Permanent racing facility
- Course length: 0.686 miles (1.104 km)
- Distance: 200 laps, 137 mi (220 km)
- Scheduled distance: 200 laps, 137 mi (220 km)
- Average speed: 82.128 mph (132.172 km/h)

Pole position
Driver	Corey Heim	Tricon Garage
- Grid positions set by competition-based formula

Most laps led
Driver	Layne Riggs	Front Row Motorsports
- Laps: 160

Winner
No. 34	Layne Riggs	Front Row Motorsports

Television in the United States
- Network: FS1
- Announcers: Jamie Little, Regan Smith, and Michael Waltrip

Radio in the United States
- Radio: MRN

The 2025 TSport 200 was the 15th stock car race of the 2025 NASCAR Craftsman Truck Series, and the 4th iteration of the event. The race was held on Friday, July 25, 2025, at the Lucas Oil Indianapolis Raceway Park in Brownsburg, Indiana, a 0.686 miles (1.104 km) permanent quad-oval shaped racetrack. The race went the entire scheduled 200 laps as scheduled to complete.

Layne Riggs, driving for Front Row Motorsports, would win the race in a dominating fashion, winning both stages and led a race-high 160 laps to earn his fourth career NASCAR Craftsman Truck Series win, and his second of the season. To fill out the podium, Corey Day, driving for Spire Motorsports, and pole-sitter Corey Heim, driving for Tricon Garage, would finish 2nd and 3rd, respectively.

Following the race, Heim claimed the regular season championship two races early. Stewart Friesen, who originally finished in third, was disqualified after post-race inspection due to a height violation. He was credited with a 35th-place finish.

== Report ==
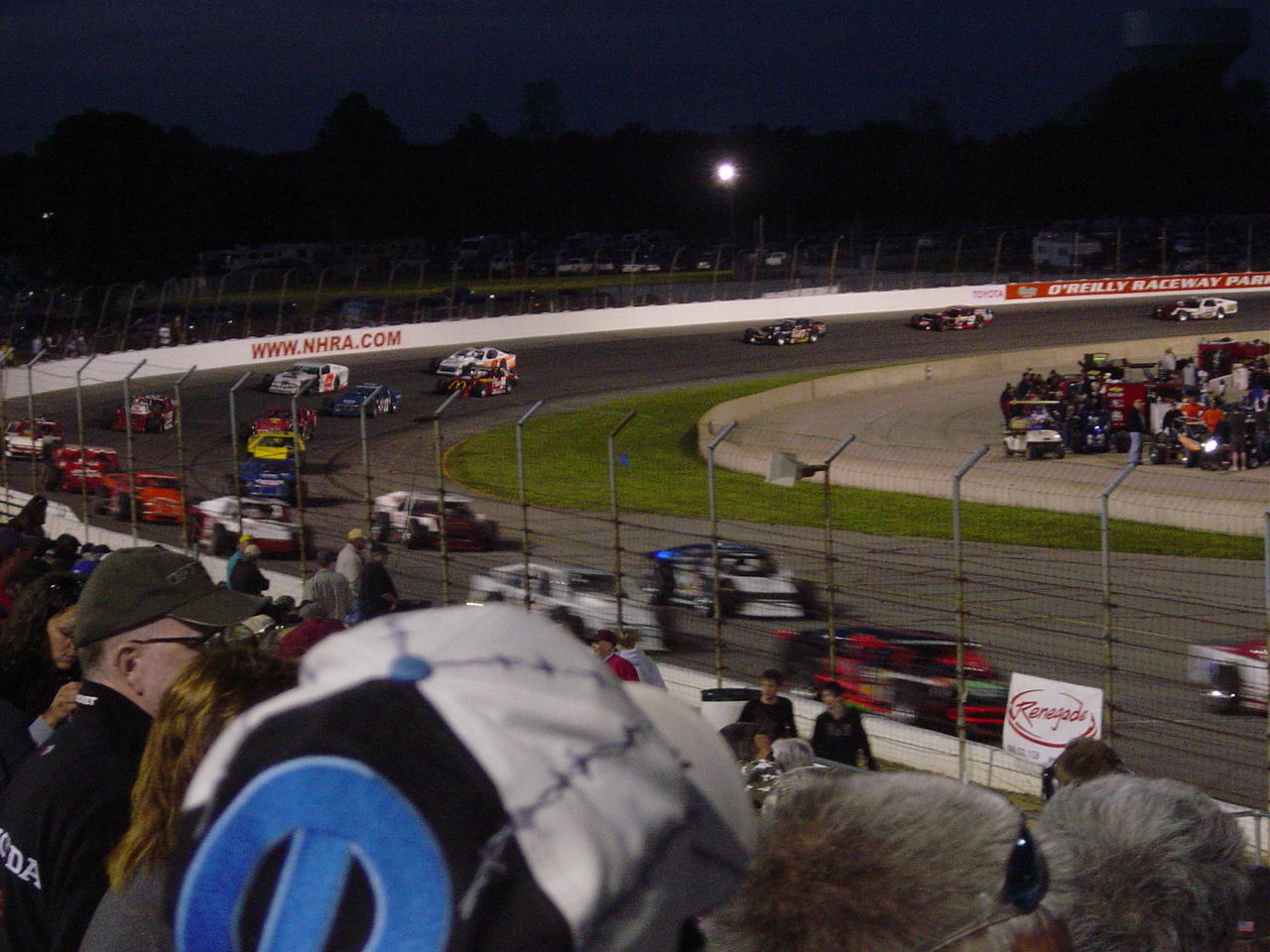
Lucas Oil Indianapolis Raceway Park, the track where the race was officially held.

Lucas Oil Indianapolis Raceway Park (formerly Indianapolis Raceway Park, O'Reilly Raceway Park at Indianapolis, and Lucas Oil Raceway) is an auto racing facility in Brownsburg, Indiana, about 10 miles (16 km) northwest of downtown Indianapolis. It includes a 0.686-mile (1.104 km) oval track, a 2.5-mile (4.0 km) road course (which has fallen into disrepair and is no longer used), and a 4,400-foot (1,300 m) drag strip which is among the premier drag racing venues in the world. The complex receives about 500,000 visitors annually.

=== Entry list ===
- (R) denotes rookie driver.
- (i) denotes driver who is ineligible for series driver points.

#	Driver	Team	Make
1	Brent Crews	Tricon Garage	Toyota
02	Jayson Alexander	Young's Motorsports	Chevrolet
2	Cody Dennison	Reaume Brothers Racing	Ford
5	Toni Breidinger (R)	Tricon Garage	Toyota
6	Norm Benning	Norm Benning Racing	Chevrolet
07	Brenden Queen	Spire Motorsports	Chevrolet
7	Corey Day (i)	Spire Motorsports	Chevrolet
9	Grant Enfinger	CR7 Motorsports	Chevrolet
11	Corey Heim	Tricon Garage	Toyota
13	Jake Garcia	ThorSport Racing	Ford
15	Tanner Gray	Tricon Garage	Toyota
17	Gio Ruggiero (R)	Tricon Garage	Toyota
18	Tyler Ankrum	McAnally-Hilgemann Racing	Chevrolet
19	Daniel Hemric	McAnally-Hilgemann Racing	Chevrolet
20	Jordan Anderson (i)	Young's Motorsports	Chevrolet
22	A. J. Waller	Reaume Brothers Racing	Ford
26	Dawson Sutton (R)	Rackley W.A.R.	Chevrolet
33	Frankie Muniz (R)	Reaume Brothers Racing	Ford
34	Layne Riggs	Front Row Motorsports	Ford
35	Greg Van Alst	Greg Van Alst Motorsports	Toyota
38	Chandler Smith	Front Row Motorsports	Ford
42	Matt Mills	Niece Motorsports	Chevrolet
44	Ross Chastain (i)	Niece Motorsports	Chevrolet
45	Kaden Honeycutt	Niece Motorsports	Chevrolet
52	Stewart Friesen	Halmar Friesen Racing	Toyota
66	Luke Fenhaus (R)	ThorSport Racing	Ford
71	Rajah Caruth	Spire Motorsports	Chevrolet
74	Boston Oliver	Mike Harmon Racing	Toyota
76	Spencer Boyd	Freedom Racing Enterprises	Chevrolet
77	Andrés Pérez de Lara (R)	Spire Motorsports	Chevrolet
81	Connor Mosack (R)	McAnally-Hilgemann Racing	Chevrolet
88	Matt Crafton	ThorSport Racing	Ford
91	Jack Wood	McAnally-Hilgemann Racing	Chevrolet
98	Ty Majeski	ThorSport Racing	Ford
99	Ben Rhodes	ThorSport Racing	Ford
Official entry list

== Practice ==
Practice was originally scheduled to be held on Friday, July 25, at 3:05 PM EST, with two 25-minute group sessions, but was postponed until 4:10 PM due to inclement weather. Because of this, only one session was run, and lasted for 35 minutes. Grant Enfinger, driving for CR7 Motorsports, would set the fastest time in the session, with a lap of 23.303, and a speed of 105.978 mph (170.555 km/h).

Pos.	#	Driver	Team	Make	Time	Speed
1	9	Grant Enfinger	CR7 Motorsports	Chevrolet	23.303	105.978
2	11	Corey Heim	Tricon Garage	Toyota	23.335	105.832
3	45	Kaden Honeycutt	Niece Motorsports	Chevrolet	23.467	105.237
Full practice results

== Starting lineup ==
Qualifying was originally scheduled to be held on Friday, July 25, at 4:10 PM EST, but was cancelled due to inclement weather, and was replaced with the practice session. The starting lineup would be determined by the performance metric system. As a result, Corey Heim, driving for Tricon Garage, was awarded the pole.

No drivers would fail to qualify.

=== Starting lineup ===
Pos.	#	Driver	Team	Make
1	11	Corey Heim	Tricon Garage	Toyota
2	98	Ty Majeski	ThorSport Racing	Ford
3	38	Chandler Smith	Front Row Motorsports	Ford
4	17	Gio Ruggiero (R)	Tricon Garage	Toyota
5	99	Ben Rhodes	ThorSport Racing	Ford
6	19	Daniel Hemric	McAnally-Hilgemann Racing	Chevrolet
7	18	Tyler Ankrum	McAnally-Hilgemann Racing	Chevrolet
8	9	Grant Enfinger	CR7 Motorsports	Chevrolet
9	66	Luke Fenhaus (R)	ThorSport Racing	Ford
10	45	Kaden Honeycutt	Niece Motorsports	Chevrolet
11	34	Layne Riggs	Front Row Motorsports	Ford
12	44	Ross Chastain (i)	Niece Motorsports	Chevrolet
13	1	Brent Crews	Tricon Garage	Toyota
14	07	Brenden Queen	Spire Motorsports	Chevrolet
15	15	Tanner Gray	Tricon Garage	Toyota
16	7	Corey Day (i)	Spire Motorsports	Chevrolet
17	81	Connor Mosack (R)	McAnally-Hilgemann Racing	Chevrolet
18	77	Andrés Pérez de Lara (R)	Spire Motorsports	Chevrolet
19	71	Rajah Caruth	Spire Motorsports	Chevrolet
20	88	Matt Crafton	ThorSport Racing	Ford
21	52	Stewart Friesen	Halmar Friesen Racing	Toyota
22	13	Jake Garcia	ThorSport Racing	Ford
23	02	Jayson Alexander	Young's Motorsports	Chevrolet
24	91	Jack Wood	McAnally-Hilgemann Racing	Chevrolet
25	42	Matt Mills	Niece Motorsports	Chevrolet
26	33	Frankie Muniz (R)	Reaume Brothers Racing	Ford
27	2	Cody Dennison	Reaume Brothers Racing	Ford
28	5	Toni Breidinger (R)	Tricon Garage	Toyota
29	26	Dawson Sutton (R)	Rackley W.A.R.	Chevrolet
30	76	Spencer Boyd	Freedom Racing Enterprises	Chevrolet
31	22	A. J. Waller	Reaume Brothers Racing	Ford
Qualified by owner's points
32	20	Jordan Anderson (i)	Young's Motorsports	Chevrolet
33	6	Norm Benning	Norm Benning Racing	Chevrolet
34	74	Boston Oliver	Mike Harmon Racing	Toyota
35	35	Greg Van Alst	Greg Van Alst Motorsports	Toyota
Official starting lineup

== Race results ==
Stage 1 Laps: 60

Pos.	#	Driver	Team	Make	Pts
1	34	Layne Riggs	Front Row Motorsports	Ford	10
2	98	Ty Majeski	ThorSport Racing	Ford	9
3	38	Chandler Smith	Front Row Motorsports	Ford	8
4	9	Grant Enfinger	CR7 Motorsports	Chevrolet	7
5	11	Corey Heim	Tricon Garage	Toyota	6
6	18	Tyler Ankrum	McAnally-Hilgemann Racing	Chevrolet	5
7	71	Rajah Caruth	Spire Motorsports	Chevrolet	4
8	7	Corey Day (i)	Spire Motorsports	Chevrolet	0
9	99	Ben Rhodes	ThorSport Racing	Ford	2
10	15	Tanner Gray	Tricon Garage	Toyota	1

Stage 2 Laps: 60

Pos.	#	Driver	Team	Make	Pts
1	34	Layne Riggs	Front Row Motorsports	Ford	10
2	99	Ben Rhodes	ThorSport Racing	Ford	9
3	9	Grant Enfinger	CR7 Motorsports	Chevrolet	8
4	38	Chandler Smith	Front Row Motorsports	Ford	7
5	45	Kaden Honeycutt	Niece Motorsports	Chevrolet	6
6	98	Ty Majeski	ThorSport Racing	Ford	5
7	11	Corey Heim	Tricon Garage	Toyota	4
8	66	Luke Fenhaus (R)	ThorSport Racing	Ford	3
9	81	Connor Mosack (R)	McAnally-Hilgemann Racing	Chevrolet	2
10	13	Jake Garcia	ThorSport Racing	Ford	1

Stage 3 Laps: 80

Fin	St	#	Driver	Team	Make	Laps	Led	Status	Pts
1	11	34	Layne Riggs	Front Row Motorsports	Ford	200	160	Running	60
2	16	7	Corey Day (i)	Spire Motorsports	Chevrolet	200	0	Running	0
3	1	11	Corey Heim	Tricon Garage	Toyota	200	20	Running	45
4	8	9	Grant Enfinger	CR7 Motorsports	Chevrolet	200	0	Running	48
5	2	98	Ty Majeski	ThorSport Racing	Ford	200	0	Running	46
6	3	38	Chandler Smith	Front Row Motorsports	Ford	200	0	Running	46
7	6	19	Daniel Hemric	McAnally-Hilgemann Racing	Chevrolet	200	0	Running	30
8	7	18	Tyler Ankrum	McAnally-Hilgemann Racing	Chevrolet	200	0	Running	34
9	12	44	Ross Chastain (i)	Niece Motorsports	Chevrolet	200	0	Running	0
10	19	71	Rajah Caruth	Spire Motorsports	Chevrolet	200	0	Running	31
11	5	99	Ben Rhodes	ThorSport Racing	Ford	200	0	Running	37
12	9	66	Luke Fenhaus (R)	ThorSport Racing	Ford	200	0	Running	28
13	15	15	Tanner Gray	Tricon Garage	Toyota	200	0	Running	25
14	10	45	Kaden Honeycutt	Niece Motorsports	Chevrolet	199	0	Running	29
15	22	13	Jake Garcia	ThorSport Racing	Ford	199	0	Running	23
16	14	07	Brenden Queen	Spire Motorsports	Chevrolet	199	0	Running	21
17	17	81	Connor Mosack (R)	McAnally-Hilgemann Racing	Chevrolet	199	0	Running	22
18	20	88	Matt Crafton	ThorSport Racing	Ford	199	0	Running	19
19	29	26	Dawson Sutton (R)	Rackley W.A.R.	Chevrolet	199	0	Running	18
20	24	91	Jack Wood	McAnally-Hilgemann Racing	Chevrolet	199	0	Running	17
21	25	42	Matt Mills	Niece Motorsports	Chevrolet	198	0	Running	16
22	18	77	Andrés Pérez de Lara (R)	Spire Motorsports	Chevrolet	198	0	Running	15
23	13	1	Brent Crews	Tricon Garage	Toyota	198	0	Running	14
24	30	76	Spencer Boyd	Freedom Racing Enterprises	Chevrolet	198	0	Running	13
25	4	17	Gio Ruggiero (R)	Tricon Garage	Toyota	198	0	Running	12
26	28	5	Toni Breidinger (R)	Tricon Garage	Toyota	198	0	Running	11
27	26	33	Frankie Muniz (R)	Reaume Brothers Racing	Ford	197	0	Running	10
28	35	35	Greg Van Alst	Greg Van Alst Motorsports	Toyota	194	0	Running	9
29	32	20	Jordan Anderson (i)	Young's Motorsports	Chevrolet	194	0	Running	0
30	23	02	Jayson Alexander	Young's Motorsports	Chevrolet	193	0	Running	7
31	33	6	Norm Benning	Norm Benning Racing	Chevrolet	99	0	Handling	6
32	31	22	A. J. Waller	Reaume Brothers Racing	Ford	65	0	Accident	5
33	34	74	Boston Oliver	Mike Harmon Racing	Toyota	39	0	Handling	4
34	27	2	Cody Dennison	Reaume Brothers Racing	Ford	8	0	Electrical	3
35	21	52	Stewart Friesen	Halmar Friesen Racing	Toyota	200	20	Running	2
Official race results

== Standings after the race ==
Drivers' Championship standings

	Pos	Driver	Points
	1	Corey Heim	735
	2	Chandler Smith	592 (–143)
	3	Layne Riggs	585 (–150)
	4	Daniel Hemric	544 (–191)
1	5	Grant Enfinger	536 (–199)
1	6	Kaden Honeycutt	520 (–215)
1	7	Ty Majeski	508 (–227)
1	8	Tyler Ankrum	502 (–233)
	9	Jake Garcia	447 (–288)
2	10	Ben Rhodes	431 (–304)
Official driver's standings

Manufacturers' Championship standings

Pos	Manufacturer	Points
1	Chevrolet	581
2	Toyota	571 (–10)
3	Ford	560 (–21)

- Note: Only the first 10 positions are included for the driver standings.

Previous race: 2025 LiUNA! 150	NASCAR Craftsman Truck Series; 2025 season	Next race: 2025 Mission 176 at The Glen
