= Layne Riggs =

American racing driver (born 2002)

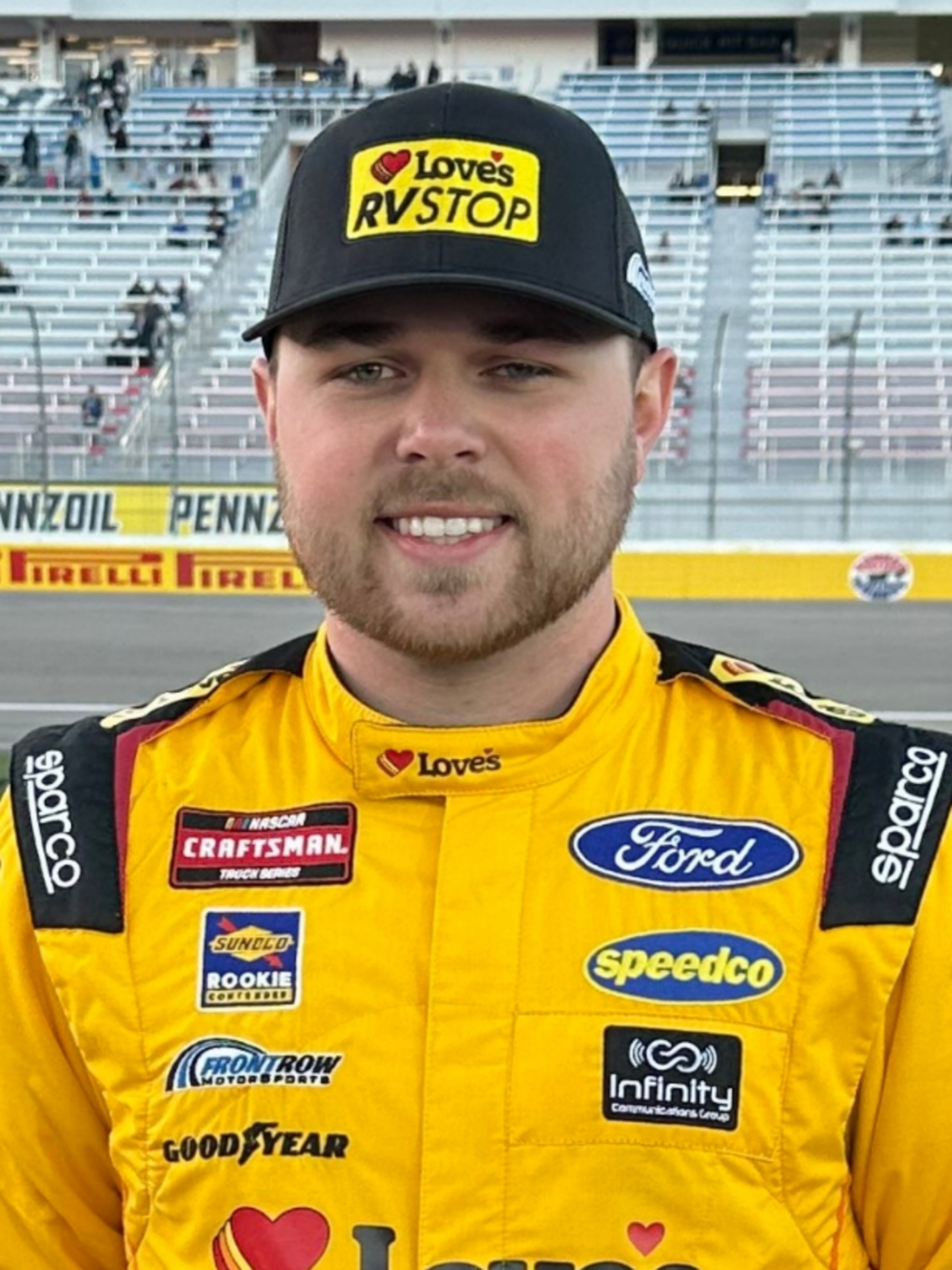
- Riggs at Las Vegas Motor Speedway in 2024
- Born: Layne Griffin Riggs; June 11, 2002 (age 24); Bahama, North Carolina, U.S.
- Achievements: 2022 NASCAR Advance Auto Parts Weekly Series Champion; 2019, 2022 Rodney Cook Classic Winner
- Awards: 2024 NASCAR Craftsman Truck Series Rookie of the Year; 2026 NASCAR Craftsman Truck Series Most Popular Driver

NASCAR O'Reilly Auto Parts Series career
- 3 races run over 1 year
- 2023 position: 44th
- Best finish: 44th (2023)
- First race: 2023 Andy's Frozen Custard 300 (Texas)
- Last race: 2023 Dead On Tools 250 (Martinsville)
Wins	Top tens	Poles
0	1	0

NASCAR FedEx Freight Truck Series career
- 79 races run over 5 years
- Truck no., team: No. 34 (Front Row Motorsports)
- 2026 position: 2nd
- Best finish: 2nd (2026)
- First race: 2022 TSport 200 (IRP)
- Last race: 2026 Craftsman 200 (Homestead)
- First win: 2024 LiUNA! 175 (Milwaukee)
- Last win: 2026 Ecosave 200 (Charlotte)
Wins	Top tens	Poles
12	43	9
- Statistics up to date as of November 6, 2026.

Layne Griffin Riggs (born June 11, 2002) is an American professional stock car racing driver. He competes full-time in the NASCAR Truck Series, driving the No. 34 Ford F-150 for Front Row Motorsports. He is the 2022 NASCAR Advance Auto Parts Weekly Series national champion and is the son of former NASCAR driver Scott Riggs.

== Racing career ==
=== Early career ===
Growing up in a racing family, Riggs began driving at the age of ten, racing in Limited Sportsman events at Orange County Speedway. He raced there for several seasons, eventually earning the track championship.

=== CARS Tour ===
On June 11, 2016, his fourteenth birthday, Riggs made his debut in the CARS Late Model Stock Tour, driving for his family team, Riggs Racing. In his first start at Tri-County Motor Speedway, he would qualify an impressive second. He would finish in twentieth after being involved in a wreck on lap 59. He would run the final five races of the season, recording his best finish of second at Southern National Motorsports Park. That same year, he would race in the Thanksgiving All-Star Classic, recording a finish of eighth.

Riggs would run the full schedule in 2017, earning two wins at Dominion Raceway and Orange County Speedway. He ended the season with two wins, five top-fives, and ten top-tens, finishing third in the final standings.

Riggs started the 2018 season on a low note, finishing outside the top-ten in the first two races. He rebounded with a ninth-place finish at Hickory Motor Speedway, along with a streak of top-three finishes in the next three races. He would earn his first win of the season at Kingsport Speedway.

In October 2019, Riggs would win the Rodney Cook Classic at Ace Speedway, after the leaders wrecked on lap 114.

2020 would be a breakout season for Riggs, finishing inside the top ten in all but two races, and capturing two wins at Langley Speedway and Carteret Motor Speedway. At the end of the season, he finished a career-high second in the final point standings.

Riggs had a struggling season in 2021, finishing outside the top-fifteen in most of the races. He scored one win, five top-fives, and five top-tens, ranking him tenth in the final point standings.

For 2022, Riggs would scale to a part-time schedule to focus on winning the national championship in the NASCAR Advance Auto Parts Weekly Series.

=== Advance Auto Parts Weekly Series ===
In 2022, Riggs would join the NASCAR Advance Auto Parts Weekly Series, and compete for the national championship, racing at Dominion Raceway, Hickory Motor Speedway, South Boston Speedway, and Wake County Speedway. After winning sixteen races, 29 top-fives, and 35 top-tens, Riggs was declared as the 2022 national champion. He finished just four points ahead of 2021 champion, Peyton Sellers. At 20 years old, he is also the youngest driver to win the championship, beating out Sellers' 2005 championship, when he won it at 21 years old.

=== Craftsman Truck Series ===
==== 2022 ====
On July 19, 2022, Halmar Friesen Racing announced that Riggs would make his NASCAR Camping World Truck Series debut at the Lucas Oil Indianapolis Raceway Park, finishing seventh driving their No. 62 Toyota Tundra, at the next race at Richmond Raceway in August and would qualify fourth for the race but would ultimately finish nineteenth, two laps down. Riggs would make his final start of the year at the season finale at Phoenix Raceway where he would qualify second and lead five laps early in the race. After being involved in a wreck during the middle of the race, he rebounded and finished thirteenth.

==== 2023 ====
On December 12, 2022, Stewart Friesen stated on SiriusXM NASCAR Radio that Riggs would return to his team for another part-time schedule in 2023. Friesen also stated that if Layne can find full sponsorship, he would most likely run full-time in the 62 truck. However, sponsorship for a full-time season was not found. On March 15, 2023, Tricon Garage announced that Riggs would drive their No. 1 truck in the race at Atlanta. Riggs also drove the No. 02 truck for Young's Motorsports in the race at Nashville. On July 27, it was announced that Riggs would drive the No. 7 truck for Spire Motorsports at the Lucas Oil Indianapolis Raceway Park in August. Riggs would qualify twelfth and run inside the top-ten for the entire race, and ultimately scored his best-career finish of third.

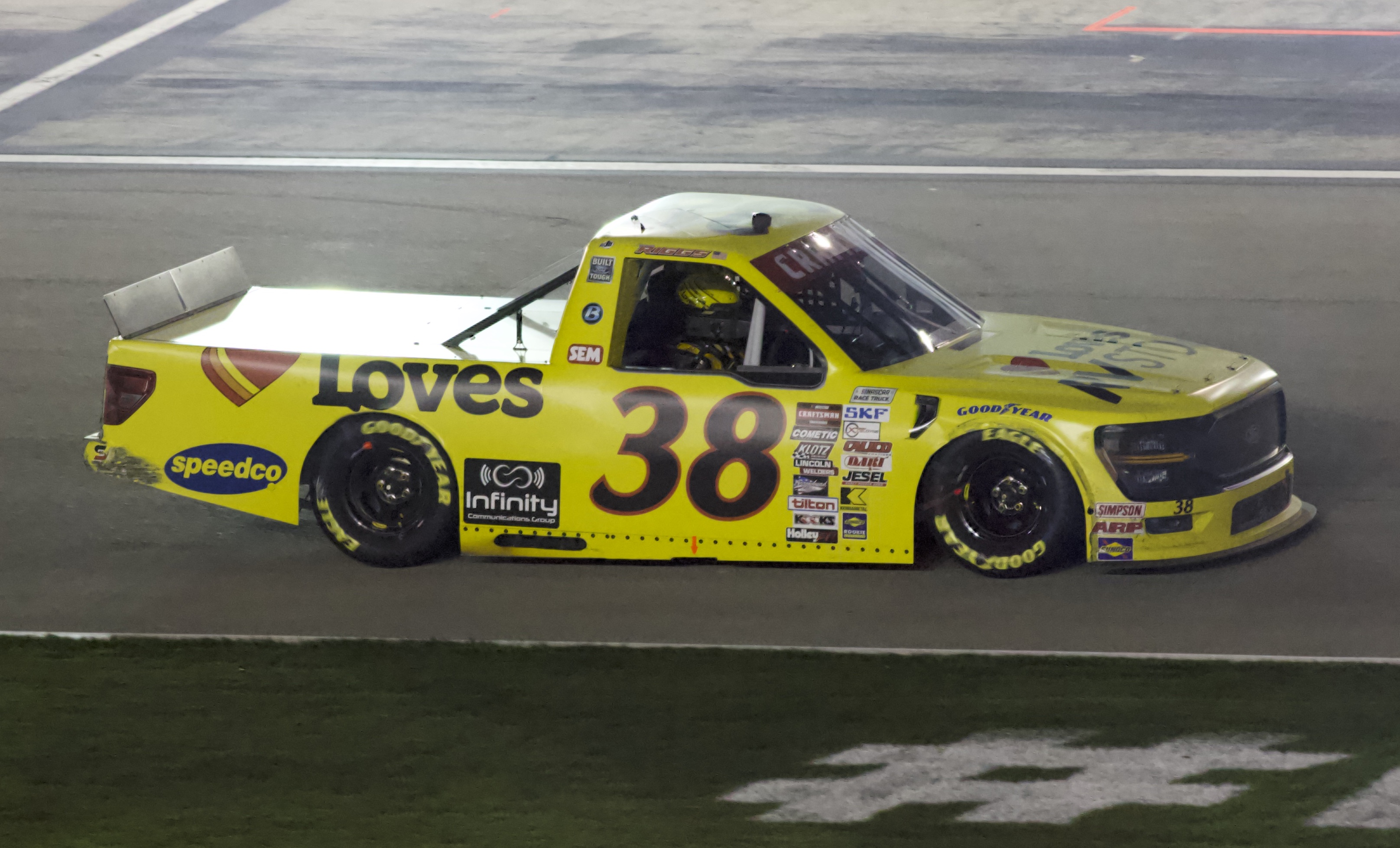
Riggs' No. 38 truck at Las Vegas Motor Speedway in 2024.

==== 2024 ====
On December 14, 2023, it was announced that Riggs had signed a multi-year deal with Front Row Motorsports to drive the No. 38 truck full-time starting in 2024. Riggs started the 2024 season with a 33rd place DNF at Daytona. A week later, he finished 24th at Atlanta, but was disqualified after a post-race inspection revealed improperly installed windshield fasteners. Despite failing to make the playoffs, Riggs scored his first two career wins at Milwaukee and Bristol and also had seven top-fives and ten top-ten finishes, and had an average finish of 16.6. He finished 11th in points and won Rookie of the Year honors.

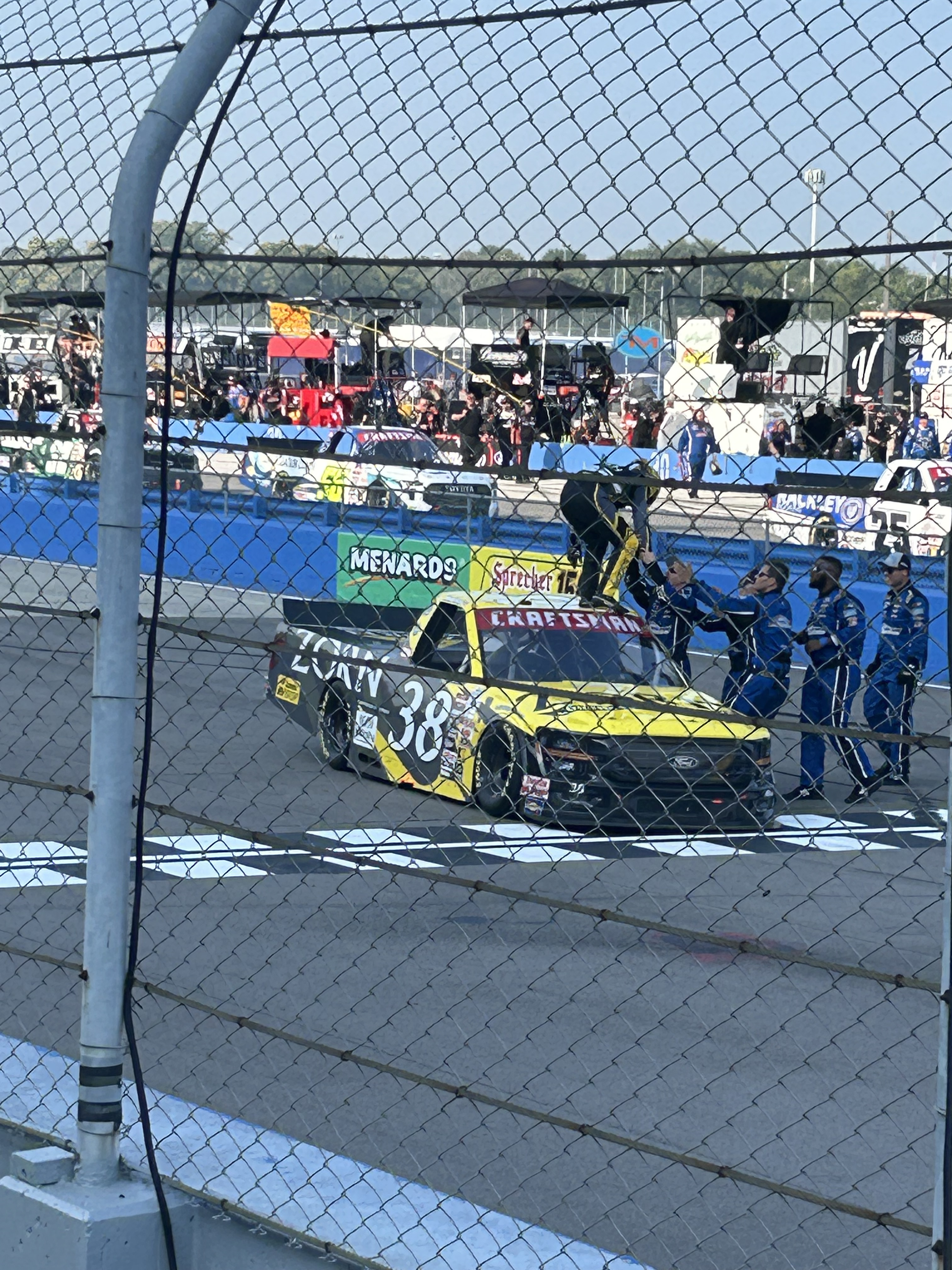
Riggs' with his crew after winning his first truck series race at Milwaukee.

==== 2025 ====
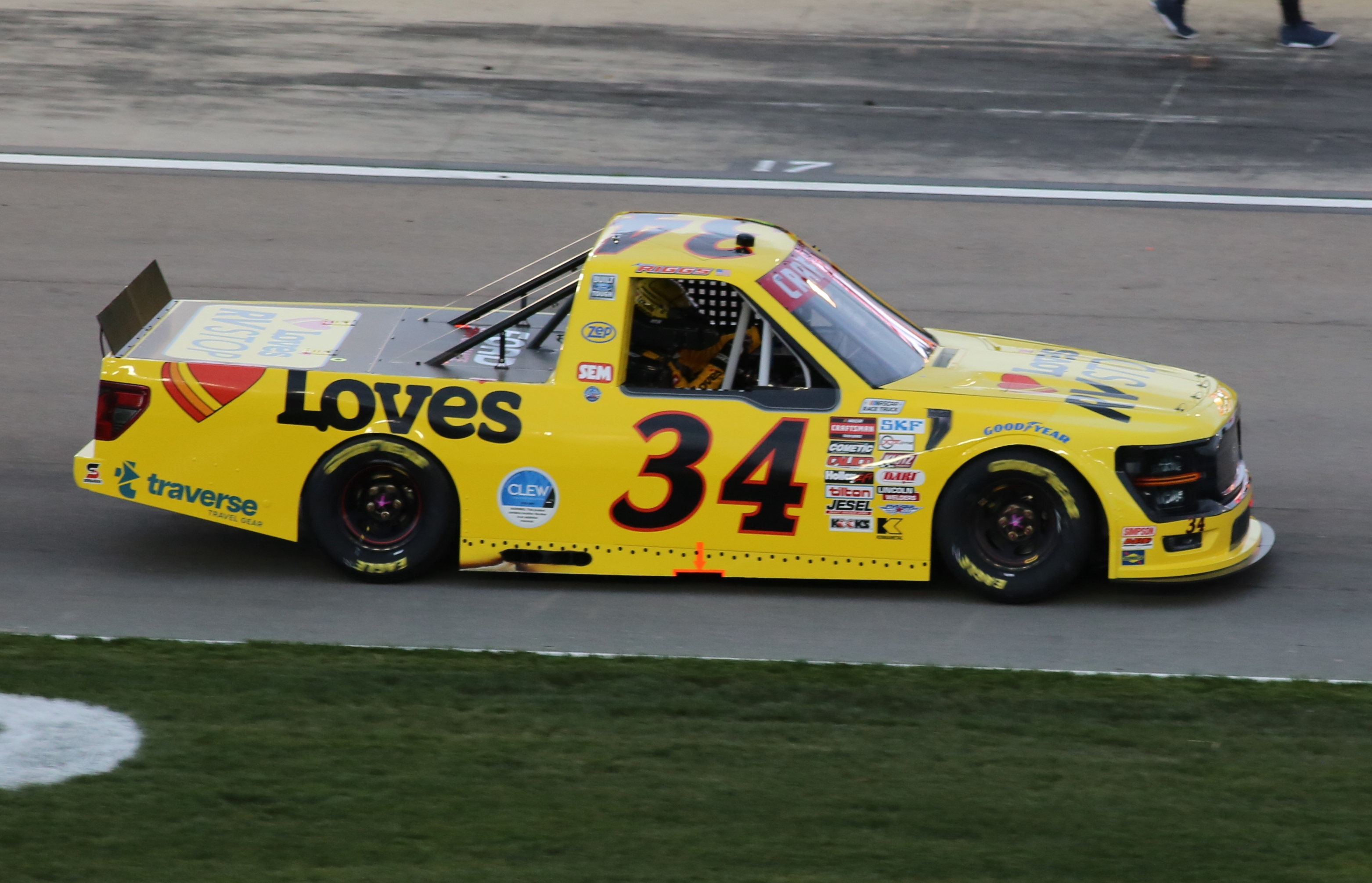
Riggs' No. 34 truck at Las Vegas Motor Speedway in 2025.

Riggs moved to No. 34 for 2025 after FRM expanded to two full-time trucks. He started the 2025 season with a 13th-place finish at Daytona. Riggs scored his first win of the season at Pocono and would lock himself into the playoffs for the first time. One month later, he won at IRP after passing Stewart Friesen and holding off Corey Day. In the playoffs, he won at Bristol, moving himself into the Round of 8. He missed the Championship 4 in a tiebreaker with Kaden Honeycutt after the Martinsville race. The following week, he finished fourth at Phoenix, and fifth in the final point standings with three wins and 16 top-tens.

==== 2026 ====
Riggs started the 2026 season with a 31st place DNF at Daytona. He scored his first win of the season in the inaugural street race at St. Petersburg. He also won back-to-back weeks at Charlotte and Nashville, before winning the inaugural race at the Coronado Street Course, a second-consecutive win at IRP and the regular season finale at New Hampshire. Entering "The Chase" as the No. 1 seed, Riggs had struggles at Bristol and Kansas, but he recovered from those mistakes by winning at Charlotte.

=== Xfinity Series ===
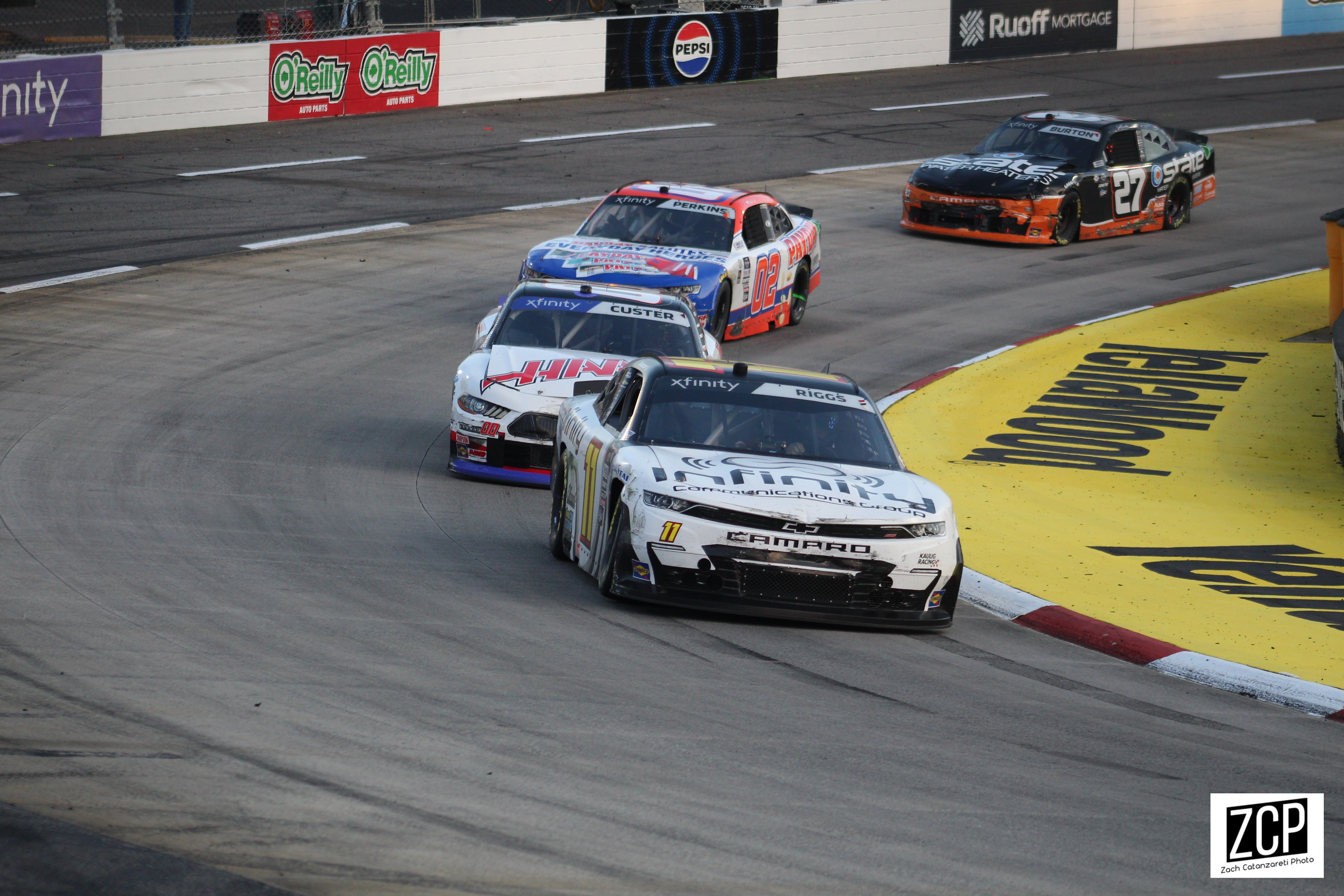
Riggs (No. 11) racing Cole Custer (No. 00), Blaine Perkins (No. 02) and Jeb Burton (No. 27) in the Xfinity Series race at Martinsville in October 2023

==== 2023 ====
On September 18, 2023, it was announced that Riggs would make his NASCAR Xfinity Series debut for Kaulig Racing in the fall race at Texas in the team's No. 11 car and would also run the races at Las Vegas and Martinsville. He would finish nineteenth at Texas, tenth at Las Vegas and eleventh at Martinsville.

== Personal life ==
Riggs is the son of former NASCAR driver, Scott Riggs. He graduated from University of North Carolina at Charlotte in 2024 with a degree in mechanical engineering.

March 3 in Durham County, North Carolina, is celebrated as Layne Riggs Day.

== Motorsports career results ==
=== Racing career summary ===
Season	Series	Team	Races	Wins	Top 5	Top 10	Points	Position
2016	CARS Late Model Stock Car Tour	Riggs Racing	6	0	2	3	127	13th
2017	CARS Late Model Stock Car Tour	Riggs Racing	13	2	5	10	342	**3rd**
2018	CARS Late Model Stock Car Tour	Riggs Racing	11	1	6	7	281	6th
2019	CARS Late Model Stock Car Tour	Riggs Racing	11	0	5	6	231	7th
2020	CARS Late Model Stock Car Tour	Riggs Racing	10	2	7	8	279	**2nd**
2021	CARS Late Model Stock Car Tour	Riggs Racing	13	1	5	5	278	10th
2022	CARS Late Model Stock Car Tour	Riggs Racing	4	0	3	3	101	22nd
2022	NASCAR Camping World Truck Series	Halmar Friesen Racing	3	0	0	1	76	38th
2023	CARS Late Model Stock Car Tour	Riggs Racing	4	0	1	3	166	20th
2023	CARS Late Model Stock Car Tour	Kevin Harvick Incorporated	4	0	1	3	166	20th
2023	NASCAR Craftsman Truck Series	Tricon Garage	1	0	0	0	0	NC†
2023	NASCAR Craftsman Truck Series	Young's Motorsports	1	0	0	0	0	NC†
2023	NASCAR Craftsman Truck Series	Spire Motorsports	1	0	1	1	0	NC†
2023	NASCAR Xfinity Series	Kaulig Racing	3	0	0	1	71	44th
2024	CARS Late Model Stock Car Tour	Kevin Harvick Incorporated	3	0	0	2	0	N/A
2024	CARS Late Model Stock Car Tour	Tom Usry Racing	2	0	1	1	0	N/A
2024	NASCAR Craftsman Truck Series	Front Row Motorsports	23	2	7	10	595	11th
2025	CARS Late Model Stock Car Tour	Tom Usry Racing	3	0	1	1	56	40th
2025	NASCAR Craftsman Truck Series	Front Row Motorsports	25	3	13	16	2297	5th
2026	NASCAR Craftsman Truck Series	Front Row Motorsports	25	7	13	15	2388	**2nd**

^{†} As Riggs was a guest driver, he was ineligible for championship points.

=== NASCAR ===
(key) (Bold – Pole position awarded by qualifying time. Italics – Pole position earned by points standings or practice time. * – Most laps led. ** – All laps led.)

==== Xfinity Series ====
NASCAR Xfinity Series results
Year	Team	No.	Make	1	2	3	4	5	6	7	8	9	10	11	12	13	14	15	16	17	18	19	20	21	22	23	24	25	26	27	28	29	30	31	32	33	NXSC	Pts	Ref
2023	Kaulig Racing	11	Chevy	DAY	CAL	LVS	PHO	ATL	COA	RCH	MAR	TAL	DOV	DAR	CLT	PIR	SON	NSH	CSC	ATL	NHA	POC	ROA	MCH	IRC	GLN	DAY	DAR	KAN	BRI	TEX; 19	ROV	LVS; 10	HOM	MAR; 11	PHO	44th	71	

==== Truck Series ====
NASCAR Truck Series results
Year	Team	No.	Make	1	2	3	4	5	6	7	8	9	10	11	12	13	14	15	16	17	18	19	20	21	22	23	24	25	NTSC	Pts	Ref
2022	Halmar Friesen Racing	62	Toyota	DAY	LVS	ATL	COA	MAR	BRD	DAR	KAN	TEX	CLT	GTW	SON	KNX	NSH	MOH	POC	IRP; 7	RCH; 19	KAN	BRI	TAL	HOM	PHO; 13			38th	76	
2023	Tricon Garage	1	Toyota	DAY	LVS	ATL; 28	COA	TEX	BRD	MAR	KAN	DAR	NWS	CLT	GTW														90th	0^{1}	
2023	Young's Motorsports	02	Chevy													NSH; 27	MOH	POC	RCH										90th	0^{1}	
2023	Spire Motorsports	7	Chevy																	IRP; 3	MLW	KAN	BRI	TAL	HOM	PHO			90th	0^{1}	
2024	Front Row Motorsports	38	Ford	DAY; 33	ATL; 33	LVS; 22	BRI; 10	COA; 27	MAR; 15	TEX; 31	KAN; 18	DAR; 21	NWS; 3	CLT; 28	GTW; 5	NSH; 25	POC; 30	IRP; 5	RCH; 5	MLW; 1	BRI; 1*	KAN; 2	TAL; 28	HOM; 22	MAR; 6	PHO; 10			11th	595	
2025	Front Row Motorsports	34	Ford	DAY; 13	ATL; 20	LVS; 5	HOM; 2	MAR; 11	BRI; 6	CAR; 11	TEX; 28	KAN; 31	NWS; 2	CLT; 4	NSH; 3	MCH; 10	**POC**; 1	LRP; 13	IRP; 1*	GLN; 10	RCH; 3	**DAR**; 17*	BRI; 1	NHA; 3	ROV; 21	TAL; 5	**MAR**; 3	**PHO**; 4	5th	2297	
2026	Front Row Motorsports	34	Ford	DAY; 31	ATL; 27	STP; 1*	DAR; 12	CAR; 3	BRI; 22	TEX; 6	GLN; 21	DOV; 3	CLT; 1*	NSH; 1*	MCH; 4	COR; 1*	**LRP**; 23*	**NWS**; 2	**IRP**; 1*	RCH; 15	**NHA**; 1*	BRI; 32*	KAN; 19	CLT; 1	**PHO**; 3	TAL; 8	MAR; 3*	HOM; 32	2nd	2388	
2027	Front Row Motorsports	34	Ford	DAY	ATL	STP	DAR	BRI	TEX	KAN	NWS	CLT	NSS	POC	MCH	LRP	ATL	IRP	BRI	BGS	MSP	NHA	KAN	CLT	PHO	TAL	MAR	HOM			

^{*} Season in progress
^{1} Ineligible for series points

=== CARS Late Model Stock Car Tour ===
(key) (Bold – Pole position awarded by qualifying time. Italics – Pole position earned by points standings or practice time. * – Most laps led. ** – All laps led.)

CARS Late Model Stock Car Tour results
Year	Team	No.	Make	1	2	3	4	5	6	7	8	9	10	11	12	13	14	15	16	17	CLMSCTC	Pts	Ref
2016	Riggs Racing	99	Ford	SNM	ROU	HCY	TCM; 20	GRE	ROU; 4	CON; 17	MYB; 10	HCY; 18	SNM; 2								13th	127	
2017	Riggs Racing	99	Ford	CON; 3	DOM; 1	DOM; 2	HCY; 6	HCY; 6	BRI; 14	AND; 8	ROU; 1**	TCM; 11	ROU; 5		CON; 8	SBO; 21					3rd	342	
2017	Riggs Racing	11	Ford											**HCY**; 10*							3rd	342	
2018	Riggs Racing	99	Ford	TCM; 14	MYB; 11	ROU	HCY; 9	BRI; 2	ACE; 3	**CCS**; 2*	**KPT**; 1*		WKS; 3	ROU; 14	**SBO**; 28						6th	281	
2018	Riggs Racing	10	Ford									HCY; 5									6th	281	
2019	Riggs Racing	99	Ford	SNM; 6	HCY; 24	ROU; 25	ACE; 20	MMS; 20	**LGY**; 5	DOM; 5	CCS; 4		ROU; 17	SBO; 4							7th	231	
2019	Riggs Racing	10	Ford									HCY; 4									7th	231	
2020	Riggs Racing	99	Ford	SNM; 5	ACE; 2	HCY; 5	HCY; 22	DOM; 5	FCS; 7	LGY; 1	**CCS**; 1**	**FLO**; 15	GRE; 3								2nd	279	
2021	Riggs Racing	99	Ford	DIL; 2*	**HCY**; 18	OCS; 21	ACE; 1*	CRW; 19	LGY; 4	DOM; 19		MMS; 17	TCM; 19	FLC; 5	WKS; 2	SBO; 16					10th	278	
2021	Riggs Racing	11	Ford								HCY; 15										10th	278	
2022	Riggs Racing	99	Ford	CRW; 26	HCY; 3	GRE; 4*	AAS	FCS	LGY	DOM	HCY	ACE	MMS	NWS	TCM	ACE	SBO; 2	CRW			22nd	101	
2023	Riggs Racing	99	Toyota	SNM	FLC	HCY; 27			LGY; 5	DOM											20th	166	
2023	Riggs Racing	99	Ford				ACE; 9	NWS; 6													20th	166	
2023	Kevin Harvick Incorporated	62	Toyota								CRW; DSQ*	HCY; 10	ACE	TCM; 9	WKS	AAS	SBO; 2	TCM	CRW		20th	166	
2024	Kevin Harvick Incorporated	62	Ford	SNM; 11	HCY	AAS	OCS; 8	ACE	TCM	LGY	DOM	CRW; 6	HCY								N/A	0	
2024	Tom Usry Racing	00R	Ford											NWS; 22	ACE	WCS	FLC	SBO; 4	TCM	NWS	N/A	0	
2025	Tom Usry Racing	17	Ford	AAS	WCS	CDL	OCS; 4*	ACE													40th	56	
2025	Tom Usry Racing	00	Ford						NWS; Wth	LGY	DOM	CRW									40th	56	
2025	Tom Usry Racing	2	Ford										HCY; 27	AND	FLC	SBO	TCM	NWS			40th	56	
