= Freedom Racing Enterprises =

American stock car racing team

- Owner(s): Chris Miller; Spencer Boyd
- Principal: Jeff Hammond (General Manager)
- Base: Mooresville, North Carolina
- Series: NASCAR Craftsman Truck Series
- Race drivers: 76. Spencer Boyd, Nathan Nicholson
- Manufacturer: Chevrolet
- Opened: 2024

Career
- Debut: 2024 Fresh From Florida 250 (Daytona)
- Latest race: 2026 Black's Tire 200 (Martinsville)
- Races competed: 73
- Drivers' Championships: 0
- Race victories: 0
- Pole positions: 0

Freedom Racing Enterprises (FRE) is an American stock car racing team that competes in the NASCAR Craftsman Truck Series. The team was founded in 2024 by Chris Miller and Spencer Boyd, and they field the No. 76 Chevrolet Silverado RST full-time for Spencer Boyd and Nathan Nicholson

== History ==
On January 8, 2024, Chris Miller and Spencer Boyd announced the formation of Freedom Racing Enterprises, a new team that would compete full-time in the Truck Series in 2024. The team purchased former GMS Racing trucks and used the owners points from the team's No. 43 truck in 2023. Miller, who is the owner of Freedom Warranty, operates the team with Boyd, who serves as an owner/driver. Longtime NASCAR crew chief Jeff Hammond serves as the team's general manager. Freedom Warranty, Nor-Cal Equipment Rentals, Tibbett's Lumber Co., and Latitude Aero were announced as the team's primary sponsors.

== Craftsman Truck Series ==
=== Truck No. 67 history ===
On January 22, 2025, it was announced that Ryan Roulette would make his Truck Series debut in the No. 67 part-time in 2025.

On March 17, 2025, it was revealed that Michel Disdier would drive the No. 67 at Homestead-Miami Speedway.

==== Truck No. 67 results ====
Year	Driver	No.	Make	1	2	3	4	5	6	7	8	9	10	11	12	13	14	15	16	17	18	19	20	21	22	23	24	25	Owners	Pts
2025	Michel Disdier	67	Chevy	DAY	ATL	LVS	HOM; 31																						45th	21
2025	Ryan Roulette	67	Chevy					MAR; 35	BRI	ROC	TEX	KAN	NWS; 32	CLT	NSH	MCH	POC	LRP	IRP	GLN	RCH; 29	DAR	BRI	NHA	ROV	TAL	MAR	PHO	45th	21

=== Truck No. 76 history ===
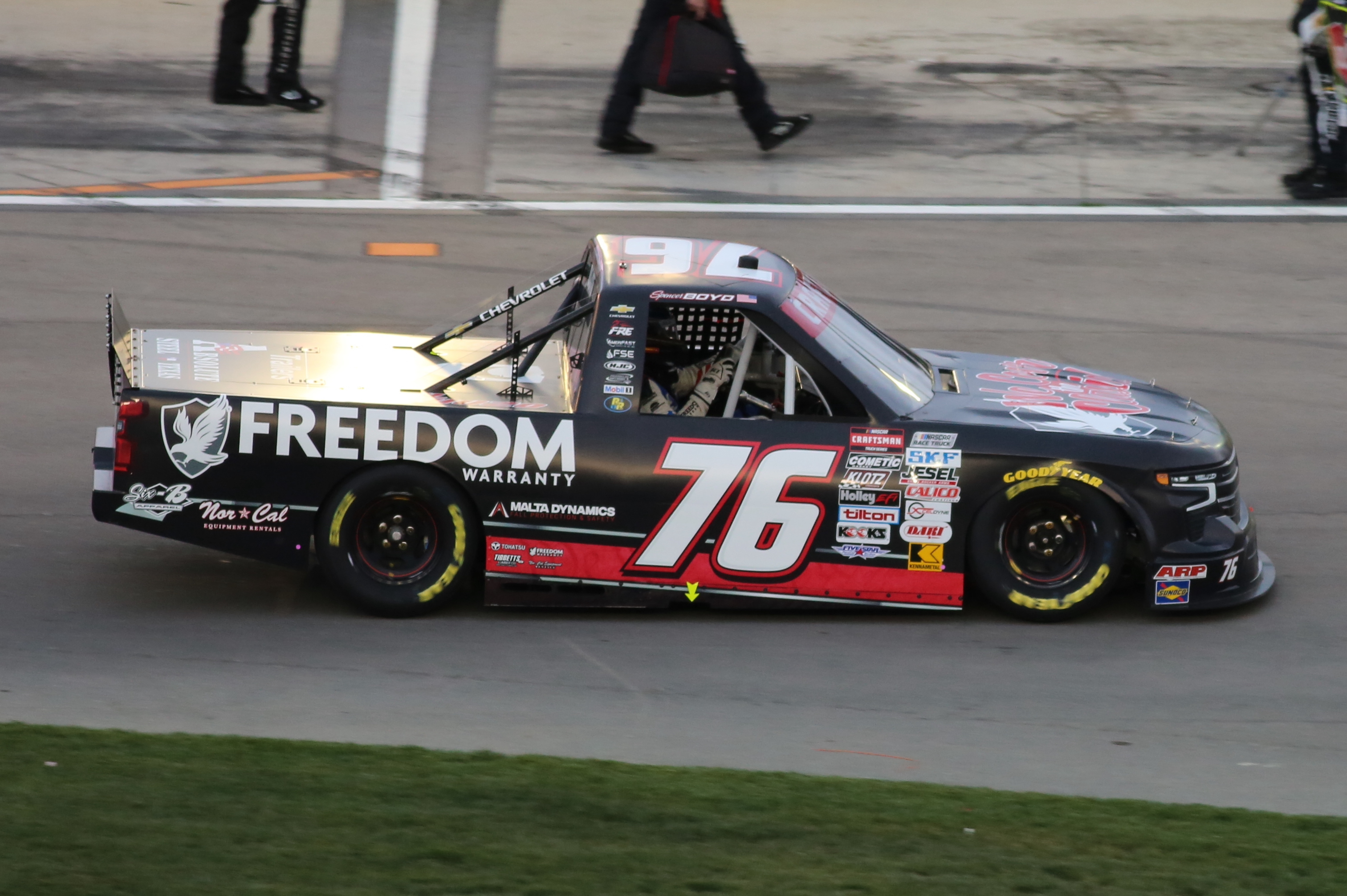
Spencer Boyd in the No. 76 truck at Las Vegas Motor Speedway in 2025.

The team ran the No. 76 truck full-time in 2024, having purchased the owners points from GMS Racing's 43 truck in 2023. Boyd drove the truck, with Greg Ely serving as the crew chief. Starting at Bristol, Hammond would replace Ely until Nashville, when Mark Hillman Jr. would take over as crew chief. Boyd's best finish was fifth in the team's first race, the 2024 Fresh From Florida 250. He would score his only other top-ten of the season at Talladega.

Boyd returned to the No. 76 truck in 2025, starting the season with a nineteenth-place finish at Daytona. He ended the season with eleven top-20 finishes.

In 2026, Boyd would drive the No. 76 truck for most of the season while Mazda MX-5 Cup driver Nathan Nicholson would drive the truck at three road course events and North Wilkesboro. IndyCar driver, Louis Foster would make his truck series debut in the No. 76 truck at Lime Rock. Caden Kvapil would make his truck series debut in the No. 76 truck at Bristol night race. Ben Maier would drive the No. 76 at Phoenix.

==== Truck No. 76 results ====
Year	Driver	No.	Make	1	2	3	4	5	6	7	8	9	10	11	12	13	14	15	16	17	18	19	20	21	22	23	24	25	Owners	Pts
2024	Spencer Boyd	76	Chevy	DAY; 5	ATL; 22	LVS; 29	BRI; 30	COA; 30	MAR; 25	TEX; 27	KAN; 31	DAR; 19	NWS; 32	CLT; 20	GTW; 26	NSH; 22	POC; 36	IRP; 34	RCH; 24	MLW; 28	BRI; 29	KAN; 28	TAL; 10	HOM; 27	MAR; 22	PHO; 28			29th	267
2025	Spencer Boyd	76	Chevy	DAY; 19	ATL; 19	LVS; 25	HOM; 28	MAR; 17	BRI; 30	ROC; 15	TEX; 15	KAN; 23	NWS; 28	CLT; 24	NSH; 26	MCH; 16	POC; 25	LRP; 31	IRP; 24	GLN; 18	RCH; 28	DAR; 23	BRI; 27	NHA; 21	ROV; 20	TAL; 15	MAR; 17	PHO; 17	26th	374
2026	Spencer Boyd	76	Chevy	DAY; 21	ATL; 26		DAR; 30	ROC; 28	BRI; 24	TEX; 20		DOV; 22	CLT; 25	NSH; 26	MCH; 34				IRP; 28	RCH; 34	NHA; 36		KAN; 20	CLT; 24		TAL; 9	MAR; 23	HOM; 30	31st	268
2026	Nathan Nicholson	76	Chevy			STP; 34					GLN; 20					COR; 28		NWS; 34											31st	268
2026	Louis Foster	76	Chevy														LRP; 21												31st	268
2026	Caden Kvapil	76	Chevy																			BRI; 35							31st	268
2026	Ben Maier	76	Chevy																						PHO; 25				31st	268
