= 2026 RaceToStopSuicide.com 200 =

NASCAR Craftsman Truck Series race at Kansas Speedway

Race details
- Race 20 of 25 in the 2026 NASCAR Craftsman Truck Series
- Date: September 26, 2026
- Location: Kansas Speedway in Kansas City, Kansas
- Course: Permanent racing facility
- Course length: 1.5 miles (2.4 km)
- Distance: 134 laps, 201 mi (323.477 km)
- Average speed: 92.996 miles per hour (149.663 km/h)

Pole position
Driver	Nick Sanchez	Spire Motorsports
- Grid positions set by competition-based formula

Most laps led
Driver	Kaden Honeycutt	Tricon Garage
- Laps: 111

Fastest lap
Driver	Tyler Ankrum	McAnally–Hilgemann Racing
- Time: 31.148

Winner
No. 11	Kaden Honeycutt	Tricon Garage

Television in the United States
- Network: FS1/FS2
- Announcers: Eric Brennan, Todd Bodine, and Michael Waltrip

Radio in the United States
- Radio: NRN
- Booth announcers: Alex Hayden, Mike Bagley, and Todd Gordon
- Turn announcers: Dave Moody (1 & 2) and Tim Catalfamo (3 & 4)

The 2026 RaceToStopSuicide.com 200 was a NASCAR Craftsman Truck Series race held on Saturday, September 26, 2026, at Kansas Speedway in Kansas City, Kansas. Contested over 134 laps on the 1.5-mile (2.4 km) asphalt oval, it was the 20th race of the 2026 NASCAR Craftsman Truck Series season, the second race in the NASCAR Chase, and the 26th running of the event.

After a nearly five-hour red flag in the final stage due to constant rain showers, Kaden Honeycutt, driving for Tricon Garage, waited out the storm, and pulled off a dominating performance, leading a race-high 111 laps and sweeping both stages to earn his third career NASCAR Craftsman Truck Series win, and his third of the season. He would also take the lead in the Chase standings after Layne Riggs hit the wall and fell back to 19th at race's end while battling for the win. Christian Eckes finished second, and Brent Crews finished third. Daniel Hemric and Ben Rhodes rounded out the top five, while Chandler Smith, Nick Leitz, Tanner Gray, Jake Garcia, and Corey LaJoie rounded out the top ten.

== Report ==
=== Background ===
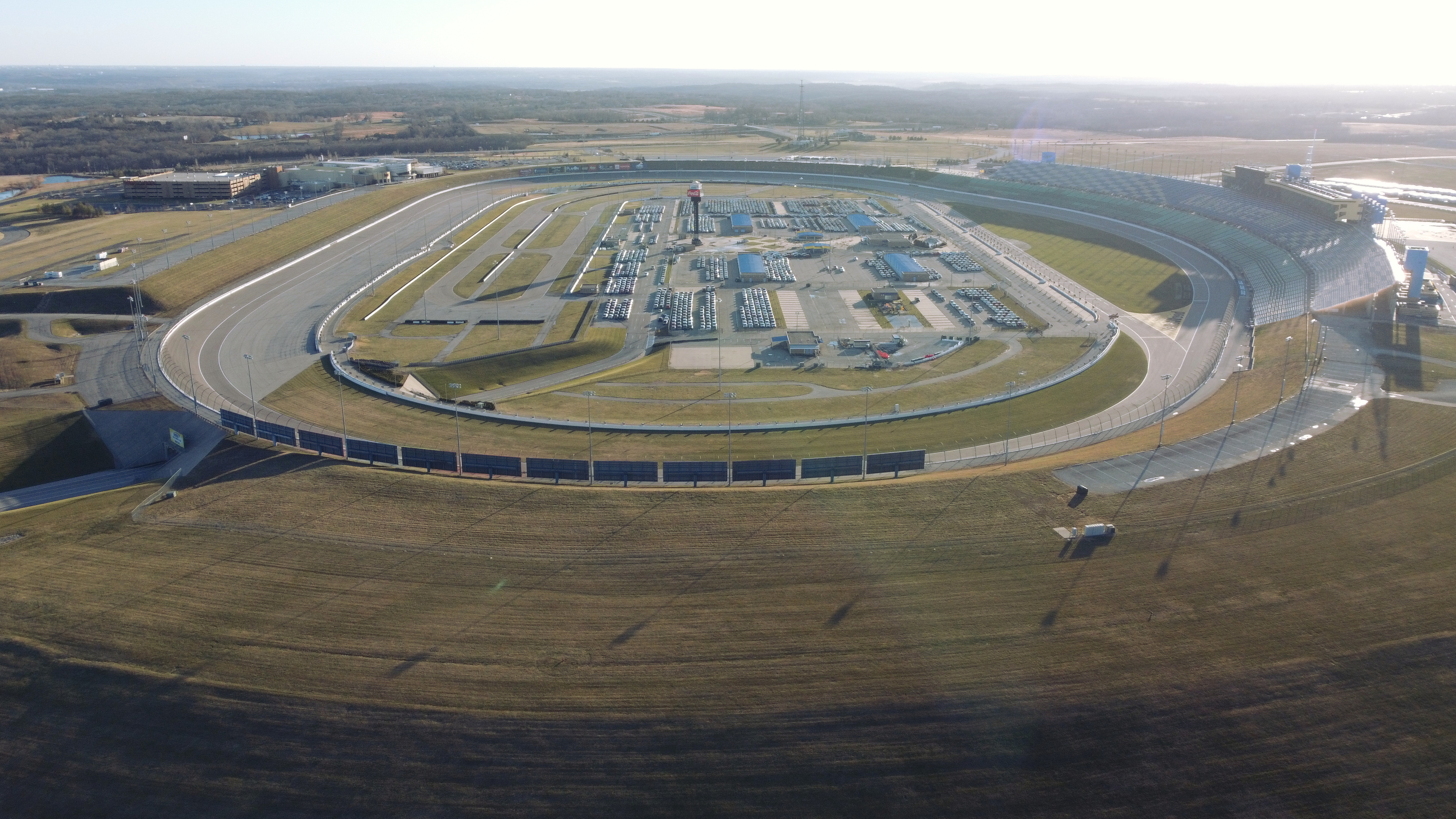
Kansas Speedway, the track where the race was held.

Kansas Speedway is a 1.5-mile (2.4 km) tri-oval race track in Kansas City, Kansas. It was built in 2001 and hosts two annual NASCAR race weekends. The NTT IndyCar Series also raced there until 2011. The speedway is owned and operated by NASCAR.

==== Entry list ====
- (R) denotes rookie driver.
- (i) denotes driver who is ineligible for series driver points.
- (CC) denotes chase contender.
- (OC) denotes owners' chase contender truck.

#	Driver	Team	Make
1	Nick Leitz (OC)	Tricon Garage	Toyota
2	Stephen Mallozzi	Team Reaume	Ford
4	Connor Hall	Niece Motorsports	Chevrolet
5	Brent Crews (i)	Tricon Garage	Toyota
7	Brennan Poole (OC) (i)	Spire Motorsports	Chevrolet
9	Grant Enfinger (CC)	CR7 Motorsports	Chevrolet
10	Corey LaJoie	Kaulig Racing	Ram
11	Kaden Honeycutt (CC)	Tricon Garage	Toyota
12	Brenden Queen (R)	Kaulig Racing	Ram
13	Cole Butcher (R)	ThorSport Racing	Ford
14	Mini Tyrrell (R)	Kaulig Racing	Ram
15	Tanner Gray	Tricon Garage	Toyota
16	Justin Haley	Kaulig Racing	Ram
17	Gio Ruggiero (CC)	Tricon Garage	Toyota
18	Tyler Ankrum (CC)	McAnally–Hilgemann Racing	Chevrolet
19	Daniel Hemric (CC)	McAnally–Hilgemann Racing	Chevrolet
20	Daniel Dye	McAnally–Hilgemann Racing	Chevrolet
22	Clayton Green	Team Reaume	Ford
25	Conor Daly	Kaulig Racing	Ram
26	Toni Breidinger	Rackley W.A.R.	Chevrolet
33	Josh Reaume	Team Reaume	Ford
34	Layne Riggs (CC)	Front Row Motorsports	Ford
38	Chandler Smith (CC)	Front Row Motorsports	Ford
42	Parker Eatmon	Niece Motorsports	Chevrolet
44	Andrés Pérez de Lara	Niece Motorsports	Chevrolet
45	Landen Lewis (OC)	Niece Motorsports	Chevrolet
52	Stewart Friesen	Halmar Friesen Racing	Toyota
62	Leland Honeyman	Halmar Friesen Racing	Toyota
76	Spencer Boyd	Freedom Racing Enterprises	Chevrolet
77	Nick Sanchez (OC)	Spire Motorsports	Chevrolet
81	Kris Wright	McAnally–Hilgemann Racing	Chevrolet
88	Ty Majeski (CC)	ThorSport Racing	Ford
91	Christian Eckes (CC)	McAnally–Hilgemann Racing	Chevrolet
93	Caleb Costner	Costner Motorsports	Chevrolet
98	Jake Garcia	ThorSport Racing	Ford
99	Ben Rhodes (CC)	ThorSport Racing	Ford
Official entry list

== Starting lineup ==
Practice and qualifying were originally scheduled to be held on Friday, September 25, at 4:00 PM and 5:05 PM CST, but were both cancelled due to inclement weather. Nick Sanchez, driving for Spire Motorsports, was awarded the pole position as a result of NASCAR's pandemic formula with a score of 4.700.

No drivers failed to qualify.

=== Starting lineup ===
Pos.	#	Driver	Team	Make
1	77	Nick Sanchez (OC)	Spire Motorsports	Chevrolet
2	98	Jake Garcia	ThorSport Racing	Ford
3	17	Gio Ruggiero (CC)	Tricon Garage	Toyota
4	11	Kaden Honeycutt (CC)	Tricon Garage	Toyota
5	5	Brent Crews (i)	Tricon Garage	Toyota
6	52	Stewart Friesen	Halmar Friesen Racing	Toyota
7	62	Leland Honeyman	Halmar Friesen Racing	Toyota
8	88	Ty Majeski (CC)	ThorSport Racing	Ford
9	16	Justin Haley	Kaulig Racing	Ram
10	9	Grant Enfinger (CC)	CR7 Motorsports	Chevrolet
11	99	Ben Rhodes (CC)	ThorSport Racing	Ford
12	19	Daniel Hemric (CC)	McAnally–Hilgemann Racing	Chevrolet
13	45	Landen Lewis (OC)	Niece Motorsports	Chevrolet
14	18	Tyler Ankrum (CC)	McAnally–Hilgemann Racing	Chevrolet
15	38	Chandler Smith (CC)	Front Row Motorsports	Ford
16	15	Tanner Gray	Tricon Garage	Toyota
17	26	Toni Breidinger	Rackley W.A.R.	Chevrolet
18	44	Andrés Pérez de Lara	Niece Motorsports	Chevrolet
19	7	Brennan Poole (OC) (i)	Spire Motorsports	Chevrolet
20	10	Corey LaJoie	Kaulig Racing	Ram
21	12	Brenden Queen (R)	Kaulig Racing	Ram
22	34	Layne Riggs (CC)	Front Row Motorsports	Ford
23	2	Stephen Mallozzi	Team Reaume	Ford
24	25	Conor Daly	Kaulig Racing	Ram
25	91	Christian Eckes (CC)	McAnally–Hilgemann Racing	Chevrolet
26	1	Nick Leitz (OC)	Tricon Garage	Toyota
27	14	Mini Tyrrell (R)	Kaulig Racing	Ram
28	81	Kris Wright	McAnally–Hilgemann Racing	Chevrolet
29	13	Cole Butcher (R)	ThorSport Racing	Ford
30	42	Parker Eatmon	Niece Motorsports	Chevrolet
31	4	Connor Hall	Niece Motorsports	Chevrolet
Qualified by owner's points
32	33	Josh Reaume	Team Reaume	Ford
33	76	Spencer Boyd	Freedom Racing Enterprises	Chevrolet
34	22	Clayton Green	Team Reaume	Ford
35	20	Daniel Dye	McAnally–Hilgemann Racing	Chevrolet
36	93	Caleb Costner	Costner Motorsports	Chevrolet
Official starting lineup

== Race ==
=== Race results ===
==== Stage Results ====
Stage One Laps: 30

Pos.	#	Driver	Team	Make	Pts
1	11	Kaden Honeycutt (CC)	Tricon Garage	Toyota	10
2	17	Gio Ruggiero (CC)	Tricon Garage	Toyota	9
3	34	Layne Riggs (CC)	Front Row Motorsports	Ford	8
4	77	Nick Sanchez (OC)	Spire Motorsports	Chevrolet	7
5	88	Ty Majeski (CC)	ThorSport Racing	Ford	6
6	91	Christian Eckes (CC)	McAnally-Hilgemann Racing	Chevrolet	5
7	19	Daniel Hemric (CC)	McAnally-Hilgemann Racing	Chevrolet	4
8	5	Brent Crews (i)	Tricon Garage	Toyota	0
9	99	Ben Rhodes (CC)	ThorSport Racing	Ford	2
10	9	Grant Enfinger (CC)	CR7 Motorsports	Chevrolet	1

Stage Two Laps: 24

Pos.	#	Driver	Team	Make	Pts
1	11	Kaden Honeycutt (CC)	Tricon Garage	Toyota	10
2	34	Layne Riggs (CC)	Front Row Motorsports	Ford	9
3	91	Christian Eckes (CC)	McAnally-Hilgemann Racing	Chevrolet	8
4	77	Nick Sanchez (OC)	Spire Motorsports	Chevrolet	7
5	17	Gio Ruggiero (CC)	Tricon Garage	Toyota	6
6	88	Ty Majeski (CC)	ThorSport Racing	Ford	5
7	19	Daniel Hemric (CC)	McAnally-Hilgemann Racing	Chevrolet	4
8	18	Tyler Ankrum (CC)	McAnally-Hilgemann Racing	Chevrolet	3
9	20	Daniel Dye	McAnally-Hilgemann Racing	Chevrolet	2
10	99	Ben Rhodes (CC)	ThorSport Racing	Ford	1

=== Final Stage Results ===
Stage Three Laps: 80

Fin	St	#	Driver	Team	Make	Laps	Led	Status	Pts
1	4	11	Kaden Honeycutt (CC)	Tricon Garage	Toyota	134	111	Running	75
2	25	91	Christian Eckes (CC)	McAnally–Hilgemann Racing	Chevrolet	134	0	Running	48
3	5	5	Brent Crews (i)	Tricon Garage	Toyota	134	0	Running	0
4	12	19	Daniel Hemric (CC)	McAnally–Hilgemann Racing	Chevrolet	134	0	Running	41
5	11	99	Ben Rhodes (CC)	ThorSport Racing	Ford	134	3	Running	35
6	15	38	Chandler Smith (CC)	Front Row Motorsports	Ford	134	0	Running	31
7	26	1	Nick Leitz (OC)	Tricon Garage	Toyota	134	0	Running	30
8	16	15	Tanner Gray	Tricon Garage	Toyota	134	0	Running	29
9	2	98	Jake Garcia	ThorSport Racing	Ford	134	0	Running	28
10	20	10	Corey LaJoie	Kaulig Racing	Ram	134	0	Running	27
11	9	16	Justin Haley	Kaulig Racing	Ram	134	0	Running	26
12	29	13	Cole Butcher (R)	ThorSport Racing	Ford	134	0	Running	25
13	3	17	Gio Ruggiero (CC)	Tricon Garage	Toyota	134	0	Running	39
14	21	12	Brenden Queen (R)	Kaulig Racing	Ram	134	0	Running	23
15	35	20	Daniel Dye	McAnally–Hilgemann Racing	Chevrolet	134	3	Running	24
16	24	25	Conor Daly	Kaulig Racing	Ram	134	0	Running	21
17	19	7	Brennan Poole (OC) (i)	Spire Motorsports	Chevrolet	134	0	Running	0
18	27	14	Mini Tyrrell (R)	Kaulig Racing	Ram	134	0	Running	19
19	22	34	Layne Riggs (CC)	Front Row Motorsports	Ford	134	3	Running	35
20	33	76	Spencer Boyd	Freedom Racing Enterprises	Chevrolet	134	0	Running	17
21	6	52	Stewart Friesen	Halmar Friesen Racing	Toyota	134	0	Running	16
22	30	42	Parker Eatmon	Niece Motorsports	Chevrolet	134	0	Running	15
23	34	22	Clayton Green	Team Reaume	Ford	133	0	Running	14
24	18	44	Andrés Pérez de Lara	Niece Motorsports	Chevrolet	132	0	Running	13
25	14	18	Tyler Ankrum (CC)	McAnally–Hilgemann Racing	Chevrolet	132	0	Running	16
26	17	26	Toni Breidinger	Rackley W.A.R.	Chevrolet	132	0	Running	11
27	23	2	Stephen Mallozzi	Team Reaume	Ford	132	0	Running	10
28	1	77	Nick Sanchez (OC)	Spire Motorsports	Chevrolet	131	0	Running	23
29	8	88	Ty Majeski (CC)	ThorSport Racing	Ford	130	0	Running	19
30	7	62	Leland Honeyman	Halmar Friesen Racing	Toyota	130	0	Running	7
31	10	9	Grant Enfinger (CC)	CR7 Motorsports	Chevrolet	129	14	Running	7
32	31	4	Connor Hall	Niece Motorsports	Chevrolet	128	0	Running	5
33	32	33	Josh Reaume	Team Reaume	Ford	119	0	Running	4
34	13	45	Landen Lewis (OC)	Niece Motorsports	Chevrolet	114	0	Accident	3
35	36	93	Caleb Costner	Costner Motorsports	Chevrolet	86	0	Accident	2
36	28	81	Kris Wright	McAnally–Hilgemann Racing	Chevrolet	9	0	Oil Pump	1
Official race results

=== Race statistics ===
- Lead changes: 9 among 5 different drivers
- Cautions/Laps: 7 for 47 laps
- Red flags: 1
- Time of race: 2 hours, 9 minutes and 41 seconds
- Average speed: 92.996 miles per hour (149.663 km/h)

== Standings after the race ==
Drivers' Championship standings

	Pos	Driver	Points
1	1	Kaden Honeycutt	2,197
1	2	Layne Riggs	2,160 (–37)
	3	Chandler Smith	2,126 (–71)
1	4	Gio Ruggiero	2,125 (–72)
3	5	Christian Eckes	2,115 (–82)
1	6	Daniel Hemric	2,110 (–87)
3	7	Ty Majeski	2,109 (–88)
1	8	Ben Rhodes	2,099 (–98)
3	9	Grant Enfinger	2,079 (–118)
	10	Tyler Ankrum	2,070 (–127)
Official driver's standings

Manufacturers' Championship standings

Pos	Manufacturer	Points
1	Ford	843
2	Toyota	818 (–25)
3	Chevrolet	760 (–83)
4	Ram	518 (–325)

- Note: Only the first 10 positions are included for the driver standings.

Previous race: 2026 UNOH 250	NASCAR Craftsman Truck Series; 2026 season	Next race: 2026 Ecosave 200 (Charlotte)
