= 2026 Zero Carbon Bioethanol 150 =

NASCAR Craftsman Truck Series race at Phoenix Raceway

2026 Zero Carbon Bioethanol 150 Powered by POET
Race details
- Race 22 of 25 of the 2026 NASCAR Craftsman Truck Series
- Date: October 16, 2026
- Location: Phoenix Raceway in Avondale, Arizona
- Course: Permanent racing facility
- Course length: 1.000 miles (1.609 km)
- Distance: 150 laps, 150 mi (241.401 km)
- Average speed: 106.572 miles per hour (171.511 km/h)

Pole position
Driver	Layne Riggs	Front Row Motorsports
- Time: 27.039

Most laps led
Driver	Kaden Honeycutt	Tricon Garage
- Laps: 53

Fastest lap
Driver	Kaden Honeycutt	Tricon Garage
- Time: 27.672

Winner
No. 11	Kaden Honeycutt	Tricon Garage

Television in the United States
- Network: FS1
- Announcers: Eric Brennan, Michael Waltrip, and Todd Bodine

Radio in the United States
- Radio: NRN
- Booth announcers: Alex Hayden, Mike Bagley and Todd Gordon
- Turn announcers: Dan Hubbard (1 & 2) and Tim Catalfamo (3 & 4)

The 2026 Zero Carbon Bioethanol 150 Powered by POET was a NASCAR Craftsman Truck Series race held on Friday, October 16, 2026, at Phoenix Raceway in Avondale, Arizona. Contested over 150 laps on the 1.000 mi (1.609 km) oval, it was the 22nd race of the 2026 NASCAR Craftsman Truck Series season, the fourth race in the NASCAR Chase, and the 32nd running of the event.

Kaden Honeycutt, driving for Tricon Garage, found redemption from the previous race, dominating the final stage to earn his fourth career NASCAR Craftsman Truck Series win, and his fourth of the season. Ty Majeski swept both stages, and Honeycutt led the race-high 53 laps. At race's end, Christian Eckes finished second, and Layne Riggs finished third. Majeski and Jake Garcia rounded out the top five, while William Sawalich, Daniel Hemric, Gio Ruggiero, Grant Enfinger, and Brent Crews rounded out the top ten.

== Report ==
=== Background ===
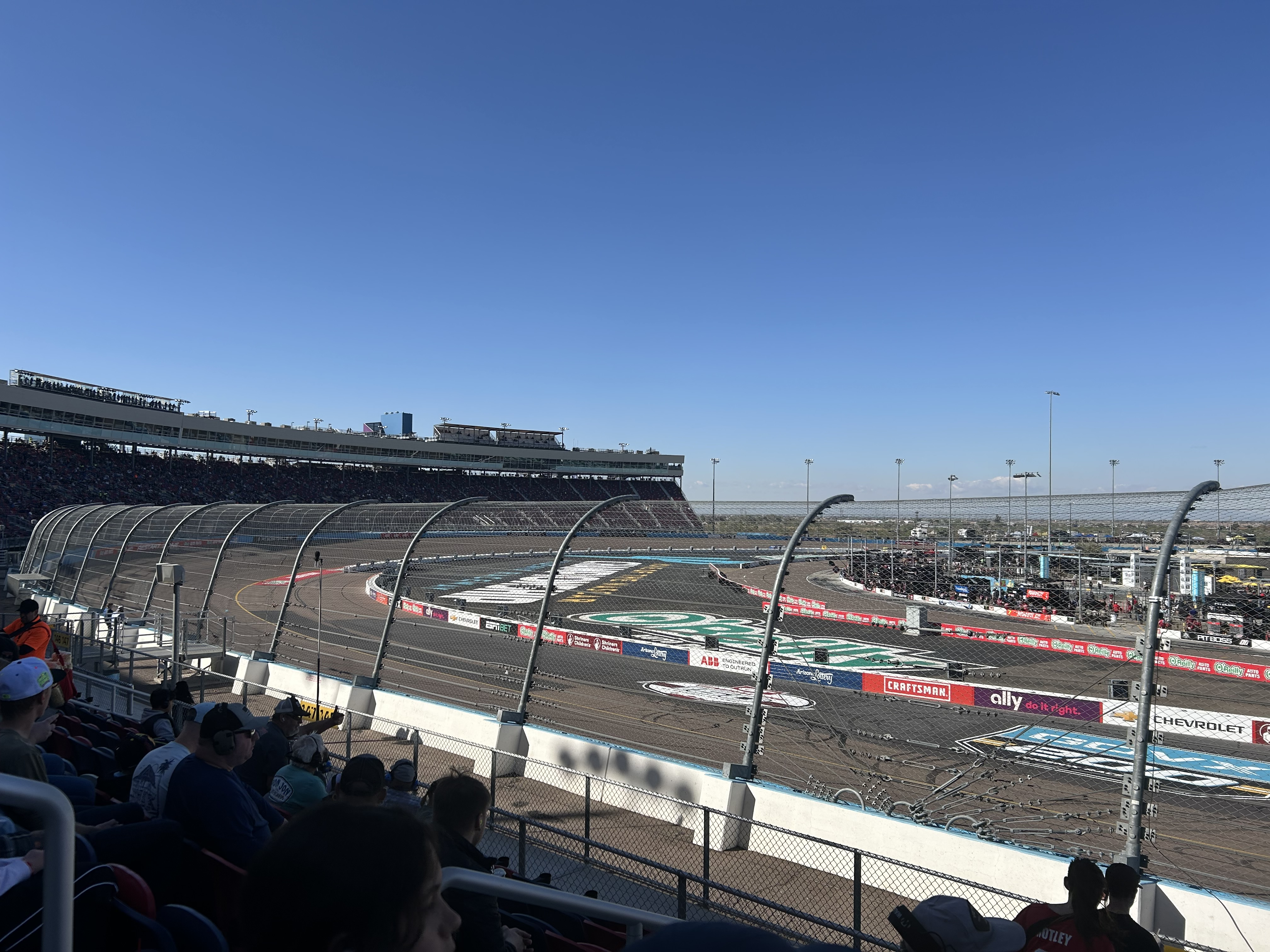
Phoenix Raceway, the track where the race was held.

Phoenix Raceway – also known as PIR – is a one-mile, low-banked tri-oval race track located in Avondale, Arizona. It is named after the nearby metropolitan area of Phoenix. The motorsport track opened in 1964 and currently hosts two NASCAR race weekends annually. PIR has also hosted the IndyCar Series, CART, USAC and the Rolex Sports Car Series. The raceway is currently owned and operated by International Speedway Corporation.

The raceway was originally constructed with a 2.5 mi (4.0 km) road course that ran both inside and outside of the main tri-oval. In 1991, the track was reconfigured with the current 1.51 mi (2.43 km) interior layout. PIR has an estimated grandstand seating capacity of around 67,000. Lights were installed around the track in 2004 following the addition of a second annual NASCAR race weekend.

Phoenix Raceway is home to two annual NASCAR race weekends, one of 13 facilities on the NASCAR schedule to host more than one race weekend a year. The track is both the first and last stop in the western United States, as well as the fourth, and hosts the championship race on the schedule. In 2026, Homestead-Miami would host the championship race, while Phoenix would retain its second date in the Round of 8.

POET's Zero Carbon Bioethanol was announced as the title sponsor on October 12, 2026.

==== Entry list ====
- (R) denotes rookie driver.
- (CC) denotes chase contender.
- (OC) denotes owners' chase contender truck.

#	Driver	Team	Make
1	Brent Crews (OC) (i)	Tricon Garage	Toyota
2	Monty Tipton	Team Reaume	Ford
4	Donovan Strauss	Niece Motorsports	Chevrolet
5	William Sawalich (i)	Tricon Garage	Toyota
7	Connor Mosack (OC)	Spire Motorsports	Chevrolet
9	Grant Enfinger (CC)	CR7 Motorsports	Chevrolet
10	Corey LaJoie	Kaulig Racing	Ram
11	Kaden Honeycutt (CC)	Tricon Garage	Toyota
12	Brenden Queen (R)	Kaulig Racing	Ram
13	Cole Butcher (R)	ThorSport Racing	Ford
14	Mini Tyrrell (R)	Kaulig Racing	Ram
15	Tanner Gray	Tricon Garage	Toyota
16	Justin Haley	Kaulig Racing	Ram
17	Gio Ruggiero (CC)	Tricon Garage	Toyota
18	Tyler Ankrum (CC)	McAnally–Hilgemann Racing	Chevrolet
19	Daniel Hemric (CC)	McAnally–Hilgemann Racing	Chevrolet
20	Toni Breidinger	McAnally–Hilgemann Racing	Chevrolet
22	Clayton Green	Team Reaume	Ford
23	Jackson Lee	Team Reaume	Ford
25	Conor Daly	Kaulig Racing	Ram
26	Dawson Sutton	Rackley W.A.R.	Chevrolet
33	Frankie Muniz	Team Reaume	Ford
34	Layne Riggs (CC)	Front Row Motorsports	Ford
38	Chandler Smith (CC)	Front Row Motorsports	Ford
42	Tyler Reif	Niece Motorsports	Chevrolet
44	Andrés Pérez de Lara	Niece Motorsports	Chevrolet
45	Landen Lewis (OC)	Niece Motorsports	Chevrolet
52	Stewart Friesen	Halmar Friesen Racing	Toyota
62	Leland Honeyman	Halmar Friesen Racing	Toyota
76	Ben Maier	Freedom Racing Enterprises	Chevrolet
77	Tristan McKee (OC)	Spire Motorsports	Chevrolet
81	Kris Wright	McAnally–Hilgemann Racing	Chevrolet
88	Ty Majeski (CC)	ThorSport Racing	Ford
91	Christian Eckes (CC)	McAnally–Hilgemann Racing	Chevrolet
98	Jake Garcia	ThorSport Racing	Ford
99	Ben Rhodes (CC)	ThorSport Racing	Ford
Official entry list

== Practice ==
The first and only practice session was held on Friday, October 16, at 12:30 PM MST, and lasted for 50 minutes.

Kaden Honeycutt, driving for Tricon Garage, set the fastest time in the session, with a lap of 27.604 seconds, and a speed of 130.416 miles per hour (209.884 km/h).

=== Practice results ===
Pos.	#	Driver	Team	Make	Time	Speed
1	11	Kaden Honeycutt (CC)	Tricon Garage	Toyota	27.604	130.416
2	99	Ben Rhodes (CC)	ThorSport Racing	Ford	27.624	130.321
3	88	Ty Majeski (CC)	ThorSport Racing	Ford	27.692	130.001
Full practice results

== Qualifying ==
Qualifying was held on Friday, October 16, at 1:35 PM MST. Since Phoenix Raceway is a mile oval, the qualifying procedure used was a single-car, one-lap system with one round. Drivers were on track by themselves and had one lap to post a qualifying time, and whoever set the fastest time won the pole.

Layne Riggs, driving for Front Row Motorsports, qualified on pole position with a lap of 27.039 seconds, and a speed of 133.141 miles per hour (214.270 km/h).

No drivers failed to qualify.

=== Qualifying results ===
Pos.	#	Driver	Team	Make	Time	Speed
1	34	Layne Riggs (CC)	Front Row Motorsports	Ford	27.039	133.141
2	11	Kaden Honeycutt (CC)	Tricon Garage	Toyota	27.194	132.382
3	38	Chandler Smith (CC)	Front Row Motorsports	Ford	27.247	132.125
4	45	Landen Lewis (OC)	Niece Motorsports	Chevrolet	27.277	131.979
5	99	Ben Rhodes (CC)	ThorSport Racing	Ford	27.300	131.868
6	88	Ty Majeski (CC)	ThorSport Racing	Ford	27.322	131.762
7	77	Tristan McKee (OC)	Spire Motorsports	Chevrolet	27.339	131.680
8	15	Tanner Gray	Tricon Garage	Toyota	27.360	131.579
9	5	William Sawalich (i)	Tricon Garage	Toyota	27.382	131.473
10	7	Connor Mosack (OC)	Spire Motorsports	Chevrolet	27.393	131.420
11	62	Leland Honeyman	Halmar Friesen Racing	Toyota	27.394	131.416
12	1	Brent Crews (OC) (i)	Tricon Garage	Toyota	27.395	131.411
13	91	Christian Eckes (CC)	McAnally–Hilgemann Racing	Chevrolet	27.453	131.133
14	13	Cole Butcher (R)	ThorSport Racing	Ford	27.517	130.828
15	9	Grant Enfinger (CC)	CR7 Motorsports	Chevrolet	27.532	130.757
16	17	Gio Ruggiero (CC)	Tricon Garage	Toyota	27.567	130.591
17	52	Stewart Friesen	Halmar Friesen Racing	Toyota	27.572	130.567
18	19	Daniel Hemric (CC)	McAnally–Hilgemann Racing	Chevrolet	27.628	130.303
19	26	Dawson Sutton	Rackley W.A.R.	Chevrolet	27.630	130.293
20	16	Justin Haley	Kaulig Racing	Ram	27.635	130.270
21	18	Tyler Ankrum (CC)	McAnally–Hilgemann Racing	Chevrolet	27.650	130.199
22	4	Donovan Strauss	Niece Motorsports	Chevrolet	27.692	130.001
23	98	Jake Garcia	ThorSport Racing	Ford	27.710	129.917
24	81	Kris Wright	McAnally–Hilgemann Racing	Chevrolet	27.722	129.861
25	12	Brenden Queen (R)	Kaulig Racing	Ram	27.783	129.576
26	20	Toni Breidinger	McAnally–Hilgemann Racing	Chevrolet	27.808	129.459
27	44	Andrés Pérez de Lara	Niece Motorsports	Chevrolet	27.810	129.450
28	14	Mini Tyrrell (R)	Kaulig Racing	Ram	27.870	129.171
29	10	Corey LaJoie	Kaulig Racing	Ram	27.966	128.728
30	42	Tyler Reif	Niece Motorsports	Chevrolet	28.030	128.434
31	2	Monty Tipton	Team Reaume	Ford	28.333	127.060
Qualified by owner's points
32	25	Conor Daly	Kaulig Racing	Ram	28.344	127.011
33	23	Jackson Lee	Team Reaume	Ford	28.637	125.711
34	22	Clayton Green	Team Reaume	Ford	28.937	124.408
35	33	Frankie Muniz	Team Reaume	Ford	—	—
36	76	Ben Maier	Freedom Racing Enterprises	Chevrolet	—	—
Official qualifying results
Official starting lineup

== Race ==
=== Race results ===
==== Stage Results ====
Stage One Laps: 45

Pos.	#	Driver	Team	Make	Pts
1	88	Ty Majeski (CC)	ThorSport Racing	Ford	10
2	34	Layne Riggs (CC)	Front Row Motorsports	Ford	9
3	45	Landen Lewis (OC)	Niece Motorsports	Chevrolet	8
4	11	Kaden Honeycutt (CC)	Tricon Garage	Toyota	7
5	38	Chandler Smith (CC)	Front Row Motorsports	Ford	6
6	91	Christian Eckes (CC)	McAnally–Hilgemann Racing	Chevrolet	5
7	99	Ben Rhodes (CC)	ThorSport Racing	Ford	4
8	15	Tanner Gray	Tricon Garage	Toyota	3
9	17	Gio Ruggiero (CC)	Tricon Garage	Toyota	2
10	98	Jake Garcia	ThorSport Racing	Ford	1

Stage Two Laps: 45

Pos.	#	Driver	Team	Make	Pts
1	88	Ty Majeski (CC)	ThorSport Racing	Ford	10
2	11	Kaden Honeycutt (CC)	Tricon Garage	Toyota	9
3	91	Christian Eckes (CC)	McAnally–Hilgemann Racing	Chevrolet	8
4	34	Layne Riggs (CC)	Front Row Motorsports	Ford	7
5	98	Jake Garcia	ThorSport Racing	Ford	6
6	17	Gio Ruggiero (CC)	Tricon Garage	Toyota	5
7	38	Chandler Smith (CC)	Front Row Motorsports	Ford	4
8	19	Daniel Hemric (CC)	McAnally–Hilgemann Racing	Chevrolet	3
9	45	Landen Lewis (OC)	Niece Motorsports	Chevrolet	2
10	5	William Sawalich (i)	Tricon Garage	Toyota	0

=== Final Stage Results ===
Stage Three Laps: 60

Fin	St	#	Driver	Team	Make	Laps	Led	Status	Pts
1	2	11	Kaden Honeycutt (CC)	Tricon Garage	Toyota	150	53	Running	72
2	13	91	Christian Eckes (CC)	McAnally–Hilgemann Racing	Chevrolet	150	2	Running	48
3	1	34	Layne Riggs (CC)	Front Row Motorsports	Ford	150	43	Running	50
4	6	88	Ty Majeski (CC)	ThorSport Racing	Ford	150	49	Running	53
5	23	98	Jake Garcia	ThorSport Racing	Ford	150	0	Running	39
6	9	5	William Sawalich (i)	Tricon Garage	Toyota	150	0	Running	0
7	18	19	Daniel Hemric (CC)	McAnally–Hilgemann Racing	Chevrolet	150	0	Running	33
8	16	17	Gio Ruggiero (CC)	Tricon Garage	Toyota	150	0	Running	36
9	15	9	Grant Enfinger (CC)	CR7 Motorsports	Chevrolet	150	0	Running	28
10	12	1	Brent Crews (OC) (i)	Tricon Garage	Toyota	150	0	Running	0
11	10	7	Connor Mosack (OC)	Spire Motorsports	Chevrolet	150	0	Running	26
12	27	44	Andrés Pérez de Lara	Niece Motorsports	Chevrolet	150	0	Running	25
13	21	18	Tyler Ankrum (CC)	McAnally–Hilgemann Racing	Chevrolet	150	0	Running	24
14	7	77	Tristan McKee (OC)	Spire Motorsports	Chevrolet	150	0	Running	23
15	3	38	Chandler Smith (CC)	Front Row Motorsports	Ford	150	0	Running	32
16	4	45	Landen Lewis (OC)	Niece Motorsports	Chevrolet	150	0	Running	31
17	29	10	Corey LaJoie	Kaulig Racing	Ram	150	0	Running	20
18	14	13	Cole Butcher (R)	ThorSport Racing	Ford	150	0	Running	19
19	17	52	Stewart Friesen	Halmar Friesen Racing	Toyota	150	3	Running	18
20	20	16	Justin Haley	Kaulig Racing	Ram	149	0	Running	17
21	5	99	Ben Rhodes (CC)	ThorSport Racing	Ford	149	0	Running	20
22	19	26	Dawson Sutton	Rackley W.A.R.	Chevrolet	148	0	Running	15
23	25	12	Brenden Queen (R)	Kaulig Racing	Ram	148	0	Running	14
24	22	4	Donovan Strauss	Niece Motorsports	Chevrolet	147	0	Running	13
25	36	76	Ben Maier	Freedom Racing Enterprises	Chevrolet	147	0	Running	12
26	24	81	Kris Wright	McAnally–Hilgemann Racing	Chevrolet	147	0	Running	11
27	30	42	Tyler Reif	Niece Motorsports	Chevrolet	147	0	Running	10
28	8	15	Tanner Gray	Tricon Garage	Toyota	147	0	Running	12
29	28	14	Mini Tyrrell (R)	Kaulig Racing	Ram	147	0	Running	8
30	32	25	Conor Daly	Kaulig Racing	Ram	147	0	Running	7
31	26	20	Toni Breidinger	McAnally–Hilgemann Racing	Chevrolet	147	0	Running	6
32	31	2	Monty Tipton	Team Reaume	Ford	147	0	Running	5
33	35	33	Frankie Muniz	Team Reaume	Ford	147	0	Running	4
34	11	62	Leland Honeyman	Halmar Friesen Racing	Toyota	145	0	Running	3
35	34	22	Clayton Green	Team Reaume	Ford	145	0	Running	2
36	33	23	Jackson Lee	Team Reaume	Ford	142	0	Running	1
Official race results

=== Race statistics ===
- Lead changes: 6 among 5 different drivers
- Cautions/Laps: 2 for 16 laps
- Red flags: 0
- Time of race: 1 hour, 24 minutes and 27 seconds
- Average speed: 106.572 miles per hour (171.511 km/h)

== Standings after the race ==
Drivers' Championship standings

	Pos	Driver	Points
	1	Kaden Honeycutt	2,323
	2	Layne Riggs	2,284 (–39)
1	3	Christian Eckes	2,211 (–112)
1	4	Chandler Smith	2,206 (–117)
2	5	Ty Majeski	2,188 (–135)
1	6	Daniel Hemric	2,175 (–148)
1	7	Gio Ruggiero	2,172 (–151)
1	8	Grant Enfinger	2,139 (–184)
1	9	Ben Rhodes	2,135 (–188)
	10	Tyler Ankrum	2,122 (–201)
Official driver's standings

Manufacturers' Championship standings

Pos	Manufacturer	Points
1	Ford	932
2	Toyota	907 (–25)
3	Chevrolet	830 (–102)
4	Ram	565 (–367)

- Note: Only the first 10 positions are included for the driver standings.

Previous race: 2026 Ecosave 200 (Charlotte)	NASCAR Craftsman Truck Series; 2026 season	Next race: 2026 Love's RV Stop 225
