= 2026 Ecosave 200 (Charlotte) =

NASCAR Craftsman Truck Series race at Charlotte Motor Speedway

Race details
- Race 21 of 25 in the 2026 NASCAR Craftsman Truck Series
- Date: October 9, 2026
- Location: Charlotte Motor Speedway in Concord, North Carolina
- Course: Permanent racing facility
- Course length: 1.5 miles (2.4 km)
- Distance: 134 laps, 201 mi (323.478 km)
- Average speed: 116.804 miles per hour (187.978 km/h)

Pole position
Driver	Connor Mosack	Spire Motorsports
- Time: 29.961

Most laps led
Driver	Kaden Honeycutt	Tricon Garage
- Laps: 85

Fastest lap
Driver	Kaden Honeycutt	Tricon Garage
- Time: 30.501

Winner
No. 34	Layne Riggs	Front Row Motorsports

Television in the United States
- Network: FOX
- Announcers: Jamie Little, Kevin Harvick, and Joey Logano

Radio in the United States
- Radio: NRN
- Booth announcers: Brad Gillie and Nick Yeoman
- Turn announcers: Andrew Kurland (1 & 2) and Pat Patterson (3 & 4)

The 2026 Ecosave 200 was a NASCAR Craftsman Truck Series race held on Friday, October 9, 2026, at Charlotte Motor Speedway in Concord, North Carolina. Contested over 134 laps on the 1.5-mile (2.4 km) asphalt oval, it was the 21st race of the 2026 NASCAR Craftsman Truck Series season, the third race in the NASCAR Chase, and the second running of the event.

Layne Riggs, driving for Front Row Motorsports, made a late pass on Kaden Honeycutt with seven laps to go, and led the remainder of the race to earn his 12th career NASCAR Craftsman Truck Series win, his seventh of the season, and sweeping both 2026 Charlotte races in the Truck Series. Riggs won the first stage, leading 47 laps, while Honeycutt won the second stage, leading the race-high 85 laps. At race's end, Christian Eckes finished second, and Honeycutt finished third. Bayley Currey and Chandler Smith rounded out the top five, while Daniel Hemric, Landen Lewis, Andrés Pérez de Lara, Tyler Ankrum, and Justin Haley rounded out the top ten.

== Report ==
=== Background ===
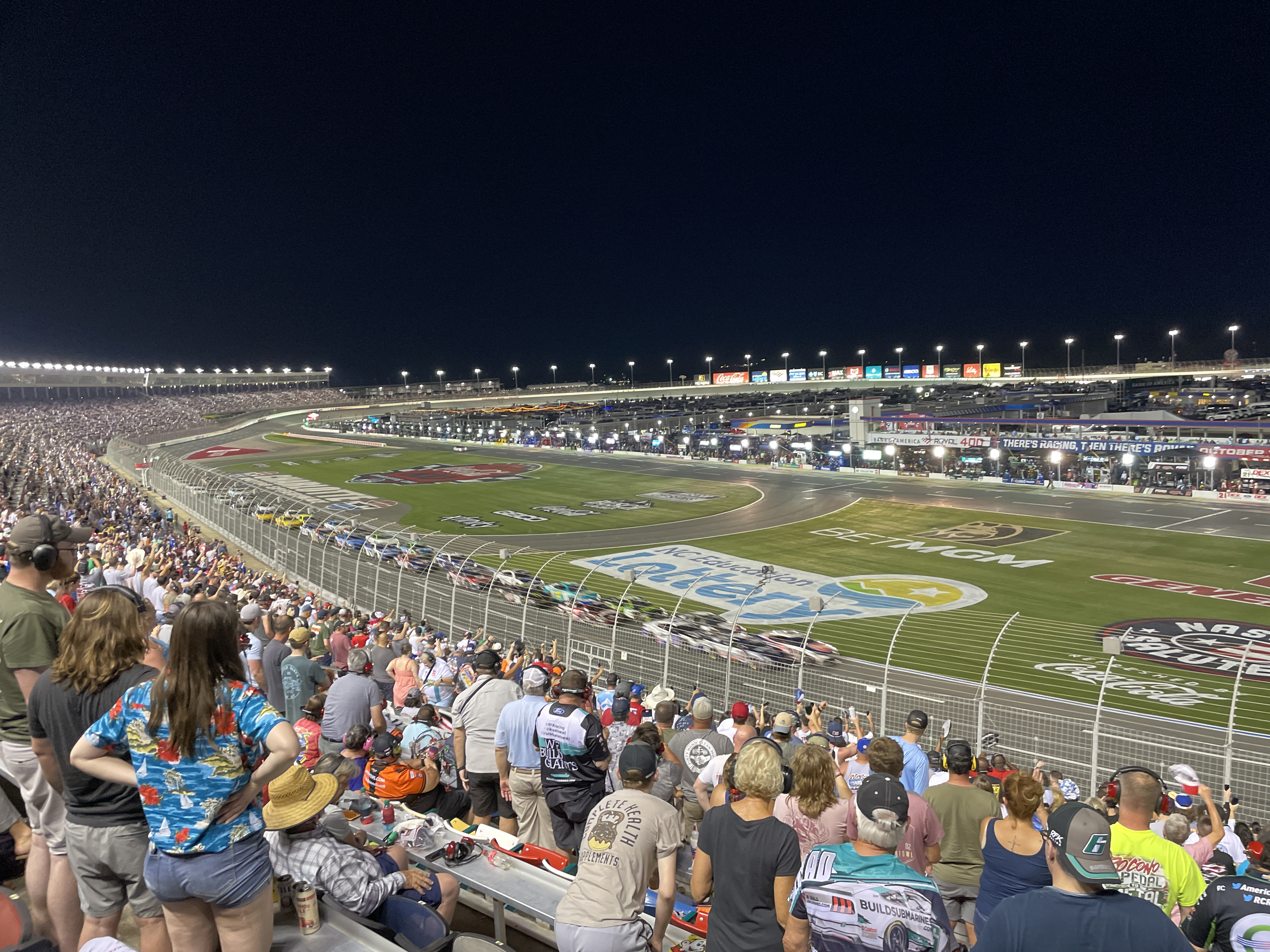
Charlotte Motor Speedway, the track where the race will be held.

The race was held at Charlotte Motor Speedway, located in Concord, North Carolina. The speedway complex includes a 1.5-mile (2.4 km) quad-oval track that was utilized for the race, as well as a dragstrip and a dirt track. The speedway was built in 1959 by Bruton Smith and is considered the home track for NASCAR with many race teams based in the Charlotte metropolitan area. The track is owned and operated by Speedway Motorsports Inc. (SMI) with Marcus Smith serving as track president.

The fall Charlotte race was originally announced to be held on the Roval configuration, but news broke that in February that it would move to the oval track.

Ecosave was announced as the title sponsor on September 24, 2026.

==== Entry list ====
- (R) denotes rookie driver.
- (CC) denotes chase contender.
- (OC) denotes owners' chase contender truck.

#	Driver	Team	Make
1	Brent Crews (OC) (i)	Tricon Garage	Toyota
2	Luke Baldwin	Team Reaume	Ford
4	Matt Mills	Niece Motorsports	Chevrolet
5	Bayley Currey	Tricon Garage	Toyota
7	Connor Mosack (OC)	Spire Motorsports	Chevrolet
9	Grant Enfinger (CC)	CR7 Motorsports	Chevrolet
10	Corey LaJoie	Kaulig Racing	Ram
11	Kaden Honeycutt (CC)	Tricon Garage	Toyota
12	Brenden Queen (R)	Kaulig Racing	Ram
13	Cole Butcher (R)	ThorSport Racing	Ford
14	Mini Tyrrell (R)	Kaulig Racing	Ram
15	Tanner Gray	Tricon Garage	Toyota
16	Justin Haley	Kaulig Racing	Ram
17	Gio Ruggiero (CC)	Tricon Garage	Toyota
18	Tyler Ankrum (CC)	McAnally–Hilgemann Racing	Chevrolet
19	Daniel Hemric (CC)	McAnally–Hilgemann Racing	Chevrolet
20	Daniel Dye	McAnally–Hilgemann Racing	Chevrolet
22	Clayton Green	Team Reaume	Ford
25	Regan Smith	Kaulig Racing	Ram
26	Dawson Sutton	Rackley W.A.R.	Chevrolet
33	Josh Reaume	Team Reaume	Ford
34	Layne Riggs (CC)	Front Row Motorsports	Ford
38	Chandler Smith (CC)	Front Row Motorsports	Ford
42	Conner Jones	Niece Motorsports	Chevrolet
44	Andrés Pérez de Lara	Niece Motorsports	Chevrolet
45	Landen Lewis (OC)	Niece Motorsports	Chevrolet
52	Stewart Friesen	Halmar Friesen Racing	Toyota
56	Timmy Hill	Hill Motorsports	Toyota
62	Leland Honeyman	Halmar Friesen Racing	Toyota
76	Spencer Boyd	Freedom Racing Enterprises	Chevrolet
77	Rajah Caruth (OC) (i)	Spire Motorsports	Chevrolet
81	Kris Wright	McAnally–Hilgemann Racing	Chevrolet
88	Ty Majeski (CC)	ThorSport Racing	Ford
91	Christian Eckes (CC)	McAnally–Hilgemann Racing	Chevrolet
98	Jake Garcia	ThorSport Racing	Ford
99	Ben Rhodes (CC)	ThorSport Racing	Ford
Official entry list

== Practice ==
The first and only practice session was held on Friday, October 9, at 1:00 PM EST, and lasted for 50 minutes.

Layne Riggs, driving for Front Row Motorsports, set the fastest time in the session, with a lap of 30.132 seconds, and a speed of 179.211 miles per hour (288.412 km/h).

=== Practice results ===
Pos.	#	Driver	Team	Make	Time	Speed
1	34	Layne Riggs (CC)	Front Row Motorsports	Ford	30.132	179.211
2	15	Tanner Gray	Tricon Garage	Toyota	30.366	177.830
3	7	Connor Mosack (OC)	Spire Motorsports	Chevrolet	30.371	177.801
Full practice results

== Qualifying ==
Qualifying was held on Friday, October 9, at 2:05 PM EST. Since Charlotte Motor Speedway is an intermediate racetrack, the qualifying procedure used was a single-car, one-lap system with one round. Drivers were on track by themselves and had one lap to post a qualifying time, and whoever set the fastest time won the pole.

Connor Mosack, driving for Spire Motorsports, qualified on pole position with a lap of 29.961 seconds, and a speed of 180.234 miles per hour (290.059 km/h).

No drivers failed to qualify.

=== Qualifying results ===
Pos.	#	Driver	Team	Make	Time	Speed
1	7	Connor Mosack (OC)	Spire Motorsports	Chevrolet	29.961	180.234
2	15	Tanner Gray	Tricon Garage	Toyota	30.023	179.862
3	11	Kaden Honeycutt (CC)	Tricon Garage	Toyota	30.053	179.683
4	77	Rajah Caruth (OC) (i)	Spire Motorsports	Chevrolet	30.071	179.575
5	45	Landen Lewis (OC)	Niece Motorsports	Chevrolet	30.128	179.235
6	5	Bayley Currey	Tricon Garage	Toyota	30.135	179.194
7	9	Grant Enfinger (CC)	CR7 Motorsports	Chevrolet	30.185	178.897
8	91	Christian Eckes (CC)	McAnally–Hilgemann Racing	Chevrolet	30.226	178.654
9	44	Andrés Pérez de Lara	Niece Motorsports	Chevrolet	30.268	178.406
10	38	Chandler Smith	Front Row Motorsports	Ford	30.280	178.336
11	42	Conner Jones	Niece Motorsports	Chevrolet	30.283	178.318
12	99	Ben Rhodes (CC)	ThorSport Racing	Ford	30.288	178.288
13	34	Layne Riggs (CC)	Front Row Motorsports	Ford	30.292	178.265
14	16	Justin Haley	Kaulig Racing	Ram	30.298	178.230
15	1	Brent Crews (OC) (i)	Tricon Garage	Toyota	30.324	178.077
16	19	Daniel Hemric (CC)	McAnally–Hilgemann Racing	Chevrolet	30.331	178.036
17	88	Ty Majeski (CC)	ThorSport Racing	Ford	30.367	177.825
18	98	Jake Garcia	ThorSport Racing	Ford	30.399	177.637
19	4	Matt Mills	Niece Motorsports	Chevrolet	30.414	177.550
20	26	Dawson Sutton	Rackley W.A.R.	Chevrolet	30.419	177.521
21	20	Daniel Dye	McAnally–Hilgemann Racing	Chevrolet	30.468	177.235
22	10	Corey LaJoie	Kaulig Racing	Ram	30.560	176.702
23	13	Cole Butcher (R)	ThorSport Racing	Ford	30.599	176.476
24	81	Kris Wright	McAnally–Hilgemann Racing	Chevrolet	30.676	176.033
25	18	Tyler Ankrum (CC)	McAnally–Hilgemann Racing	Chevrolet	30.678	176.022
26	52	Stewart Friesen	Halmar Friesen Racing	Toyota	30.690	175.953
27	12	Brenden Queen (R)	Kaulig Racing	Ram	30.733	175.707
28	62	Leland Honeyman	Halmar Friesen Racing	Toyota	30.766	175.518
29	14	Mini Tyrrell (R)	Kaulig Racing	Ram	30.807	175.285
30	25	Regan Smith	Kaulig Racing	Ram	31.049	173.919
31	56	Timmy Hill	Hill Motorsports	Toyota	31.711	170.288
Qualified by owner's points
32	2	Luke Baldwin	Team Reaume	Ford	31.752	170.068
33	76	Spencer Boyd	Freedom Racing Enterprises	Chevrolet	32.107	168.188
34	33	Josh Reaume	Team Reaume	Ford	32.168	167.869
35	22	Clayton Green	Team Reaume	Ford	32.391	166.713
36	17	Gio Ruggiero	Tricon Garage	Toyota	—	—
Official qualifying results
Official starting lineup

== Race ==
=== Race results ===
==== Stage results ====
Stage One Laps: 30

Pos.	#	Driver	Team	Make	Pts
1	34	Layne Riggs (CC)	Front Row Motorsports	Ford	10
2	11	Kaden Honeycutt (CC)	Tricon Garage	Toyota	9
3	38	Chandler Smith (CC)	Front Row Motorsports	Ford	8
4	91	Christian Eckes (CC)	McAnally-Hilgemann Racing	Chevrolet	7
5	7	Connor Mosack (OC)	Spire Motorsports	Chevrolet	6
6	9	Grant Enfinger (CC)	CR7 Motorsports	Chevrolet	5
7	77	Rajah Caruth (OC) (i)	Spire Motorsports	Chevrolet	0
8	15	Tanner Gray	Tricon Garage	Toyota	3
9	1	Brent Crews (OC) (i)	Tricon Garage	Toyota	0
10	5	Bayley Currey	Tricon Garage	Toyota	1

Stage Two Laps: 30

Pos.	#	Driver	Team	Make	Pts
1	11	Kaden Honeycutt (CC)	Tricon Garage	Toyota	10
2	34	Layne Riggs (CC)	Front Row Motorsports	Ford	9
3	38	Chandler Smith (CC)	Front Row Motorsports	Ford	8
4	77	Rajah Caruth (OC) (i)	Spire Motorsports	Chevrolet	0
5	91	Christian Eckes (CC)	McAnally-Hilgemann Racing	Chevrolet	6
6	1	Brent Crews (OC) (i)	Tricon Garage	Toyota	0
7	5	Bayley Currey	Tricon Garage	Toyota	4
8	15	Tanner Gray	Tricon Garage	Toyota	3
9	9	Grant Enfinger (CC)	CR7 Motorsports	Chevrolet	2
10	19	Daniel Hemric (CC)	McAnally-Hilgemann Racing	Chevrolet	1

=== Final Stage results ===
Stage Three Laps: 74

Fin	St	#	Driver	Team	Make	Laps	Led	Status	Pts
1	13	34	Layne Riggs (CC)	Front Row Motorsports	Ford	134	47	Running	74
2	8	91	Christian Eckes (CC)	McAnally–Hilgemann Racing	Chevrolet	134	0	Running	48
3	3	11	Kaden Honeycutt (CC)	Tricon Garage	Toyota	134	85	Running	54
4	6	5	Bayley Currey	Tricon Garage	Toyota	134	0	Running	38
5	10	38	Chandler Smith (CC)	Front Row Motorsports	Ford	134	0	Running	48
6	16	19	Daniel Hemric (CC)	McAnally–Hilgemann Racing	Chevrolet	134	0	Running	32
7	5	45	Landen Lewis (OC)	Niece Motorsports	Chevrolet	134	0	Running	30
8	9	44	Andrés Pérez de Lara	Niece Motorsports	Chevrolet	134	0	Running	29
9	25	18	Tyler Ankrum (CC)	McAnally–Hilgemann Racing	Chevrolet	134	0	Running	28
10	14	16	Justin Haley	Kaulig Racing	Ram	134	0	Running	27
11	17	88	Ty Majeski (CC)	ThorSport Racing	Ford	134	0	Running	26
12	7	9	Grant Enfinger (CC)	CR7 Motorsports	Chevrolet	134	0	Running	32
13	27	12	Brenden Queen (R)	Kaulig Racing	Ram	134	0	Running	24
14	20	26	Dawson Sutton	Rackley W.A.R.	Chevrolet	134	0	Running	23
15	29	14	Mini Tyrrell (R)	Kaulig Racing	Ram	134	0	Running	22
16	22	10	Corey LaJoie	Kaulig Racing	Ram	134	0	Running	21
17	30	25	Regan Smith	Kaulig Racing	Ram	134	0	Running	20
18	23	13	Cole Butcher (R)	ThorSport Racing	Ford	134	0	Running	19
19	2	15	Tanner Gray	Tricon Garage	Toyota	134	0	Running	24
20	15	1	Brent Crews (OC) (i)	Tricon Garage	Toyota	134	0	Running	0
21	12	99	Ben Rhodes (CC)	ThorSport Racing	Ford	134	0	Running	16
22	32	2	Luke Baldwin	Team Reaume	Ford	134	0	Running	15
23	19	4	Matt Mills	Niece Motorsports	Chevrolet	133	0	Running	14
24	33	76	Spencer Boyd	Freedom Racing Enterprises	Chevrolet	133	0	Running	13
25	24	81	Kris Wright	McAnally–Hilgemann Racing	Chevrolet	130	0	Running	12
26	36	17	Gio Ruggiero (CC)	Tricon Garage	Toyota	129	0	Running	11
27	34	33	Josh Reaume	Team Reaume	Ford	126	0	Running	10
28	21	20	Daniel Dye	McAnally–Hilgemann Racing	Chevrolet	125	0	Accident	9
29	18	98	Jake Garcia	ThorSport Racing	Ford	120	0	Running	8
30	28	62	Leland Honeyman	Halmar Friesen Racing	Toyota	117	0	Accident	7
31	4	77	Rajah Caruth (OC) (i)	Spire Motorsports	Chevrolet	117	0	Accident	0
32	31	56	Timmy Hill	Hill Motorsports	Toyota	117	0	Accident	5
33	1	7	Connor Mosack (OC)	Spire Motorsports	Chevrolet	117	2	Accident	10
34	11	42	Conner Jones	Niece Motorsports	Chevrolet	115	0	Handling	3
35	26	52	Stewart Friesen	Halmar Friesen Racing	Toyota	98	0	Accident	2
36	35	22	Clayton Green	Team Reaume	Ford	57	0	Overheating	1
Official race results

=== Race statistics ===
- Lead changes: 8 among 3 different drivers
- Cautions/Laps: 5 for 28 laps
- Red flags: 1
- Time of race: 1 hour, 43 minutes and 15 seconds
- Average speed: 116.804 miles per hour (187.978 km/h)

== Standings after the race ==
Drivers' Championship standings

	Pos	Driver	Points
	1	Kaden Honeycutt	2,251
	2	Layne Riggs	2,234 (–17)
	3	Chandler Smith	2,174 (–77)
1	4	Christian Eckes	2,163 (–88)
1	5	Daniel Hemric	2,142 (–109)
2	6	Gio Ruggiero	2,136 (–115)
	7	Ty Majeski	2,135 (–116)
	8	Ben Rhodes	2,115 (–136)
	9	Grant Enfinger	2,111 (–140)
	10	Tyler Ankrum	2,098 (–153)
Official driver's standings

Manufacturers' Championship standings

Pos	Manufacturer	Points
1	Ford	898
2	Toyota	852 (–46)
3	Chevrolet	795 (–103)
4	Ram	545 (–353)

- Note: Only the first 10 positions are included for the driver standings.

Previous race: 2026 RaceToStopSuicide.com 200	NASCAR Craftsman Truck Series; 2026 season	Next race: 2026 Zero Carbon Bioethanol 150
