= 2022 NASCAR Camping World Truck Series =

American motorsport season

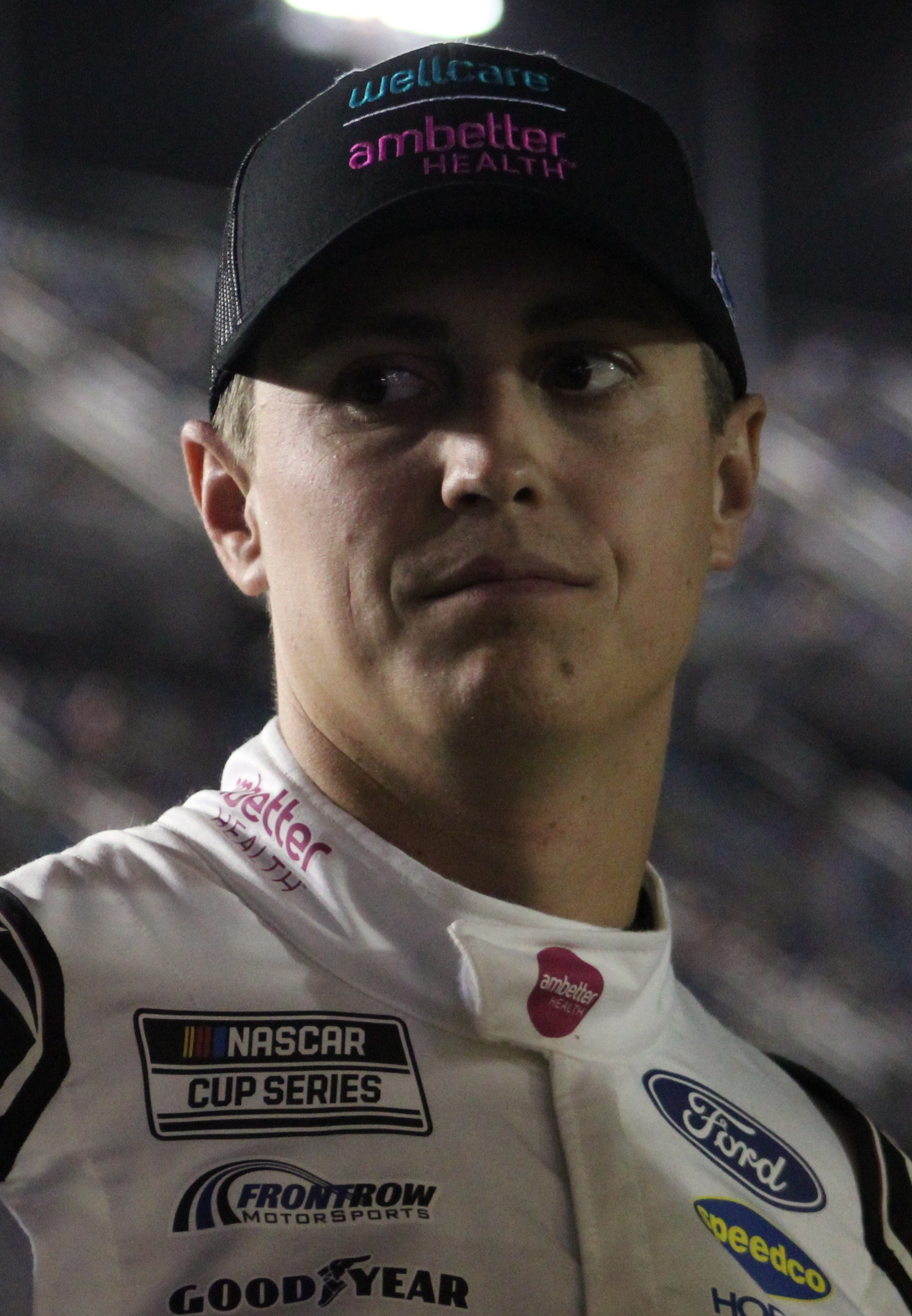
Zane Smith, the 2022 Camping World Truck Series champion and 2022 regular season champion.

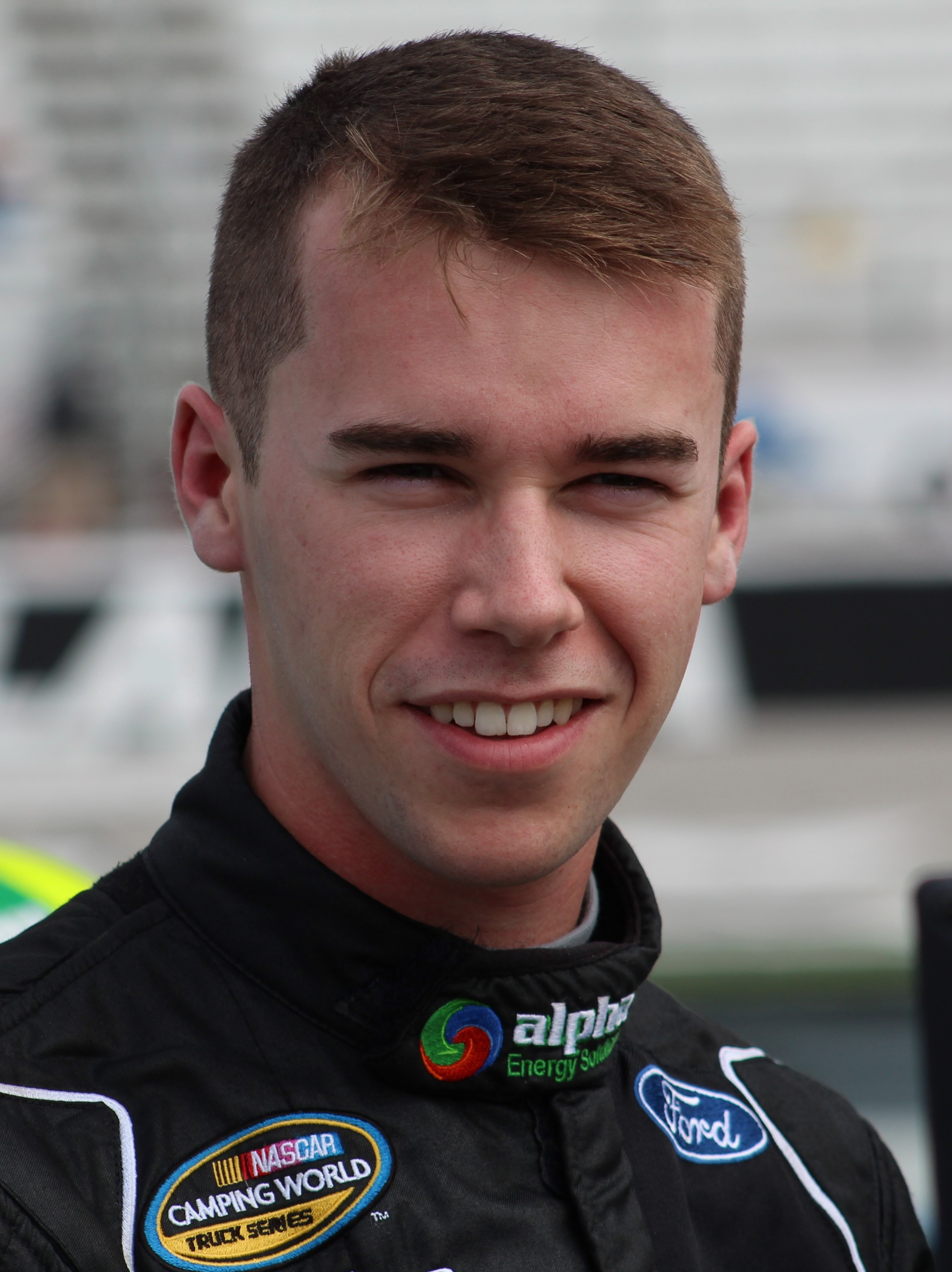
Ben Rhodes finished second behind Z. Smith in the championship.

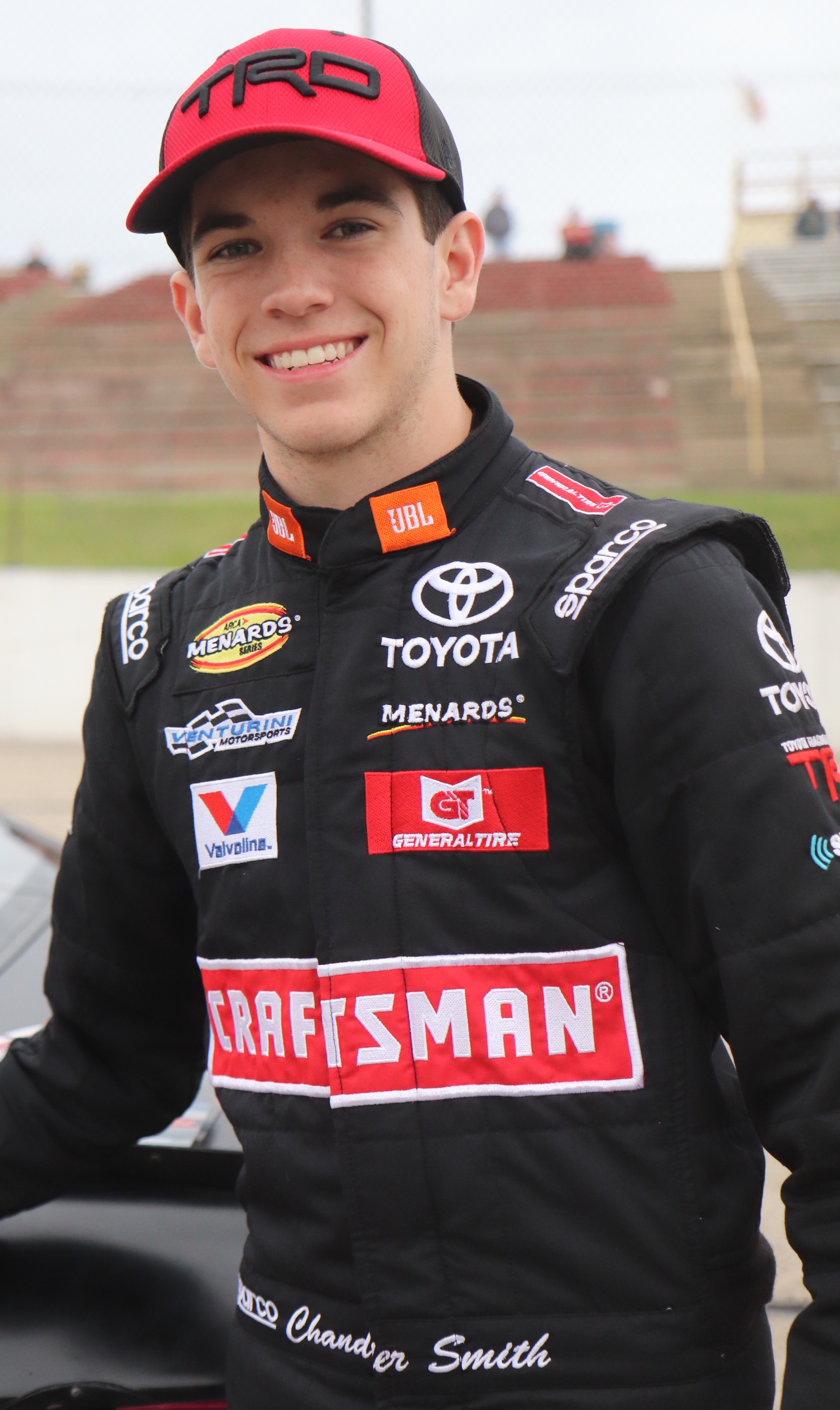
Chandler Smith finished third in the championship.

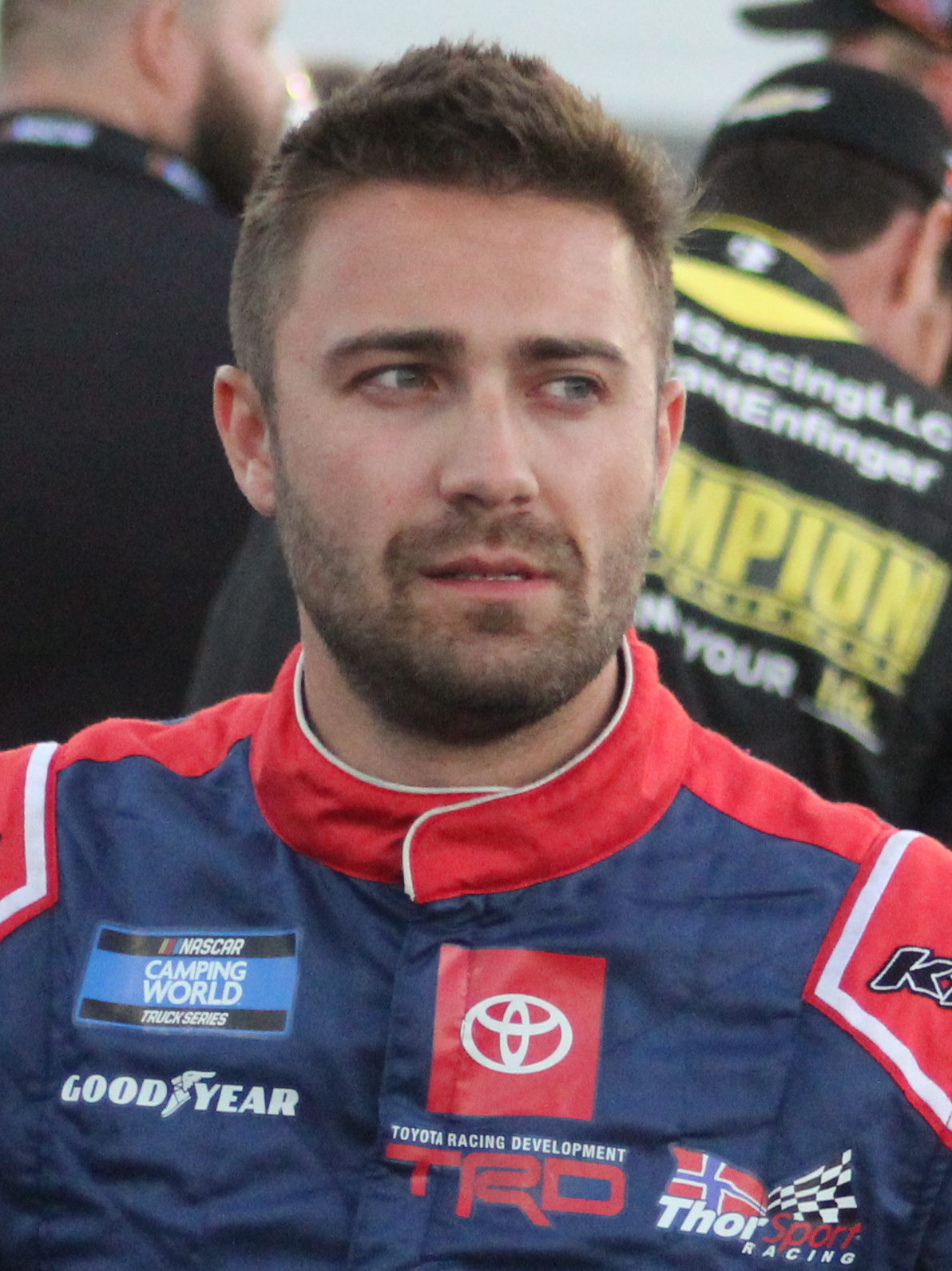
Ty Majeski finished fourth in the championship.

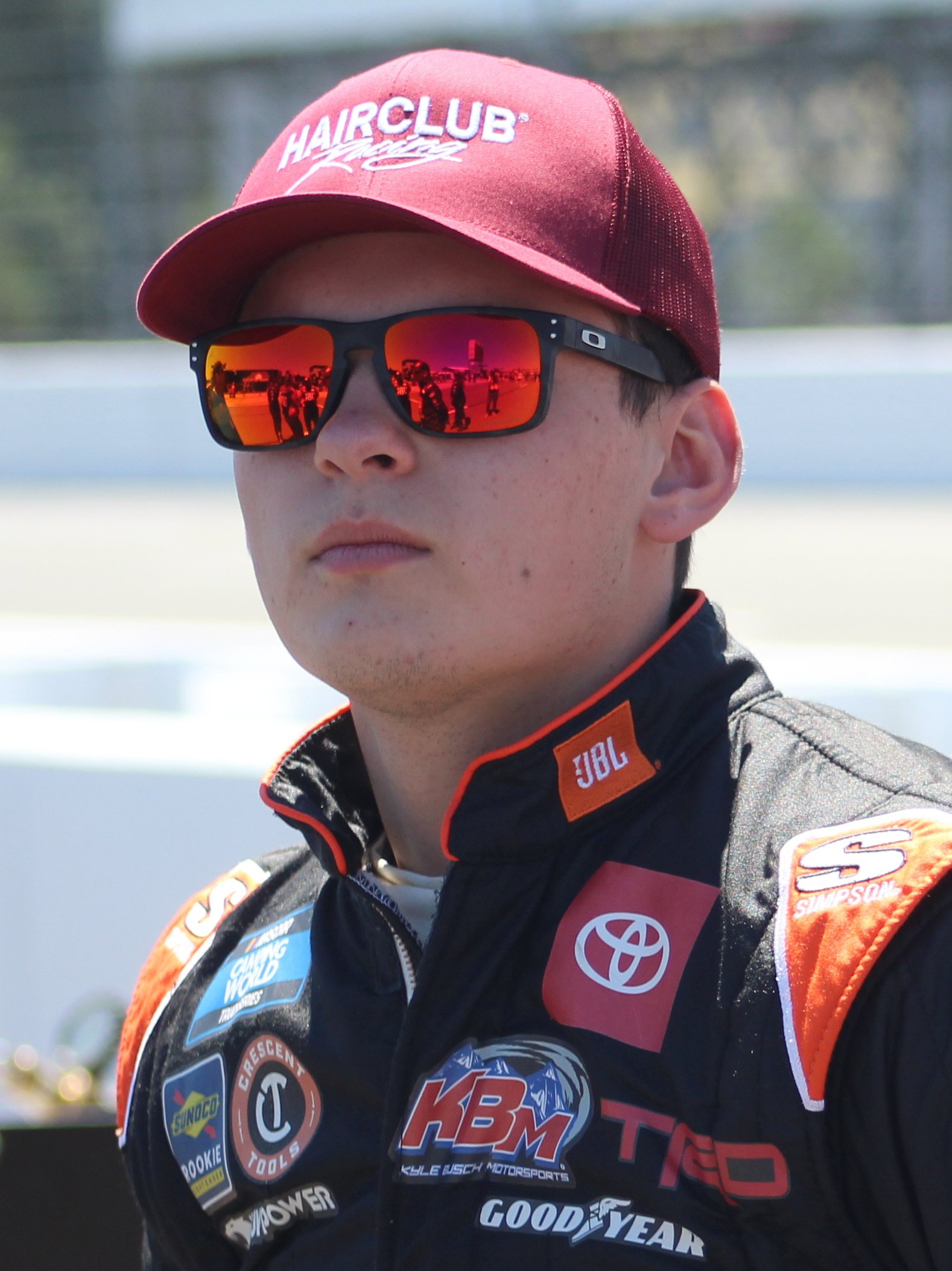
Corey Heim, the 2022 Camping World Truck Series Rookie of the Year.

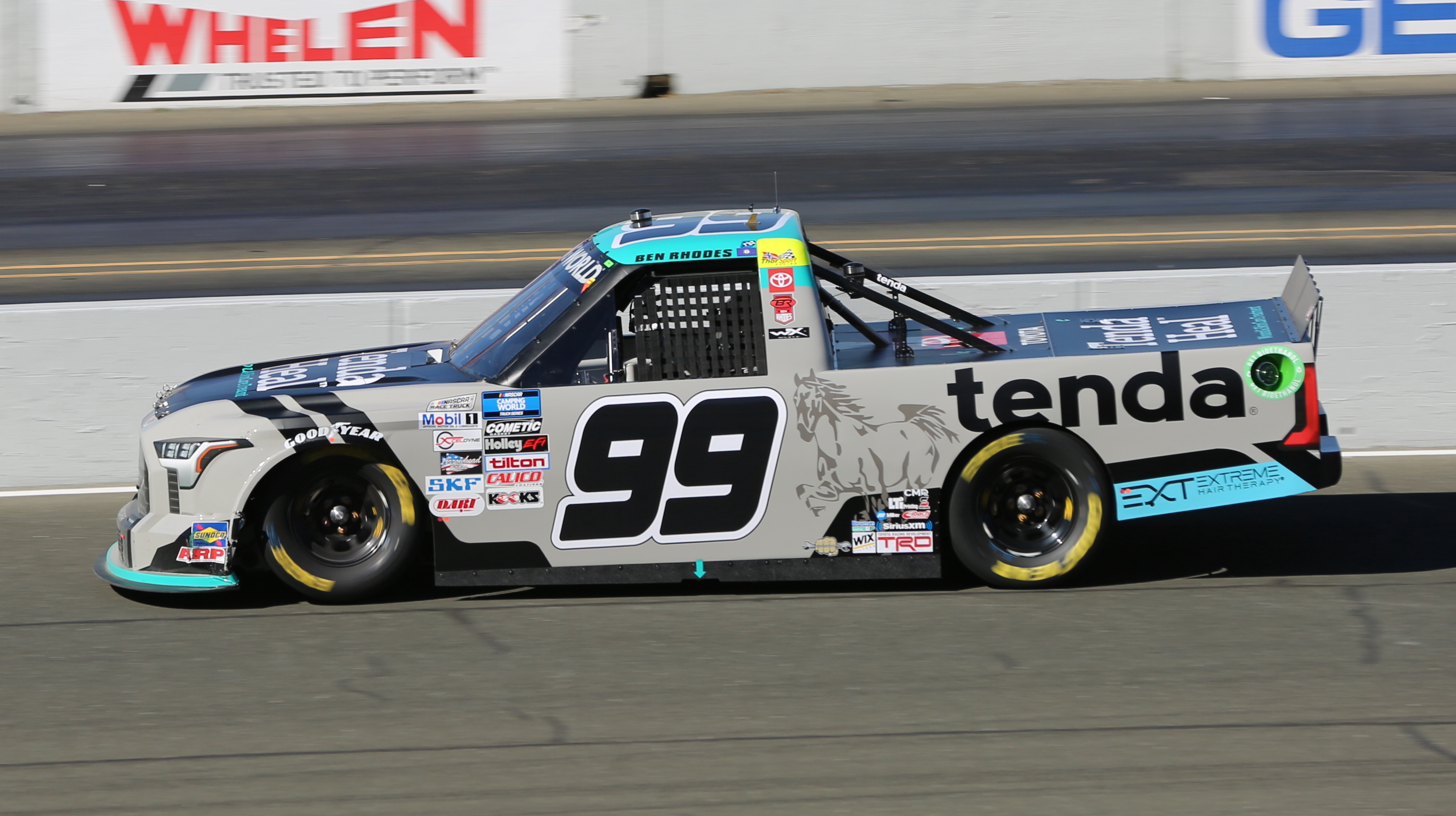
Toyota won the manufacturers' championship with 860 points and 12 wins.

The 2022 NASCAR Camping World Truck Series was the 28th season of the NASCAR Camping World Truck Series, a Pickup truck racing series sanctioned by NASCAR in the United States. The season started with the NextEra Energy 250 on February 18 at Daytona International Speedway, and concluded with the Lucas Oil 150 on November 4 at Phoenix Raceway.

This was the final season of the Truck Series with Camping World as the title sponsor, as CEO Marcus Lemonis announced the brand would not return for the 2023 season. On August 26, 2022, it was announced that Craftsman would return as the Truck Series title sponsor, although the tool company is now owned by Stanley Black & Decker instead of Sears, who owned Craftsman when they were the series title sponsor from 1995 to 2008. This makes Stanley Black & Decker the series' third title sponsor. Zane Smith of Front Row Motorsports clinched both the regular season championship and the Camping World Truck Series championship. Toyota won its 13th manufacturers' championship. Corey Heim of Kyle Busch Motorsports won the 2022 Camping World Truck Series Rookie of the Year honors.

== Teams and drivers ==
=== Complete schedule ===
Manufacturer	Team	No.	Race driver	Crew chief
Chevrolet	CR7 Motorsports	9	Blaine Perkins (R)	Doug George
Chevrolet	GMS Racing	23	Grant Enfinger	Charles Denike 14; Jeff Hensley 9
Chevrolet	GMS Racing	24	Jack Wood (R)	Tom Ackerman
Chevrolet	McAnally–Hilgemann Racing	19	Derek Kraus	Shane Wilson 13; Unknown 1 Charles Denike 9
Chevrolet	McAnally–Hilgemann Racing	91	Colby Howard	Mark Hillman
Chevrolet	Niece Motorsports	40	Dean Thompson (R)	Matt Weber 5 Cody Efaw 1 Joe Lax 8 Ryan Salomon 8 Wally Rogers 1
Chevrolet	Niece Motorsports	42	Carson Hocevar (Note: Daniel Suárez practiced the truck at Sonoma (race 12) and then relieved Hocevar in the race due to Hocevar's ankle injury in his crash at Gateway.)	Phil Gould
Chevrolet	Niece Motorsports	45	Lawless Alan (R)	Darren Fraley 14; Joe Lax 8 Cody Efaw 1
Chevrolet	Rackley W.A.R.	25	Matt DiBenedetto	Chad Kendrick
Chevrolet	Young's Motorsports	02	Jesse Little 10	Eddie Troconis 3 Steven Dawson 20
Chevrolet	Young's Motorsports	02	Kaz Grala 12	Eddie Troconis 3 Steven Dawson 20
Chevrolet	Young's Motorsports	02	Johnny Sauter 1	Eddie Troconis 3 Steven Dawson 20
Chevrolet	Young's Motorsports	12	Spencer Boyd	Ryan London
Chevrolet	Young's Motorsports	20	Danny Bohn 2	Joe Lax 3 Andrew Abbott 19; Matt Cooper 1
Chevrolet	Young's Motorsports	20	Matt Mills 5	Joe Lax 3 Andrew Abbott 19; Matt Cooper 1
Chevrolet	Young's Motorsports	20	Sheldon Creed 1	Joe Lax 3 Andrew Abbott 19; Matt Cooper 1
Chevrolet	Young's Motorsports	20	Dillon Steuer 1	Joe Lax 3 Andrew Abbott 19; Matt Cooper 1
Chevrolet	Young's Motorsports	20	Austin Dillon 2	Joe Lax 3 Andrew Abbott 19; Matt Cooper 1
Chevrolet	Young's Motorsports	20	Garrett Smithley 1	Joe Lax 3 Andrew Abbott 19; Matt Cooper 1
Chevrolet	Young's Motorsports	20	Thad Moffitt 1 (Note: Entries were fielded in a collaboration with GMS Racing.)	Joe Lax 3 Andrew Abbott 19; Matt Cooper 1
Chevrolet	Young's Motorsports	20	Stefan Parsons 2	Joe Lax 3 Andrew Abbott 19; Matt Cooper 1
Chevrolet	Young's Motorsports	20	Trey Burke 1	Joe Lax 3 Andrew Abbott 19; Matt Cooper 1
Chevrolet	Young's Motorsports	20	Jesse Little 3	Joe Lax 3 Andrew Abbott 19; Matt Cooper 1
Chevrolet	Young's Motorsports	20	Joey Gase 1	Joe Lax 3 Andrew Abbott 19; Matt Cooper 1
Chevrolet	Young's Motorsports	20	Leland Honeyman 1	Joe Lax 3 Andrew Abbott 19; Matt Cooper 1
Chevrolet	Young's Motorsports	20	Parker Retzlaff 1	Joe Lax 3 Andrew Abbott 19; Matt Cooper 1
Chevrolet	Young's Motorsports	20	Armani Williams 1	Joe Lax 3 Andrew Abbott 19; Matt Cooper 1
Ford	David Gilliland Racing	1	Hailie Deegan	Mike Hillman Jr. 17; Jerry Baxter 6
Ford	David Gilliland Racing	15	Tanner Gray	Jerry Baxter 17; Mike Hillman Jr. 6
Ford	David Gilliland Racing	17	Riley Herbst 2	Chad Johnston 16; Mike Hillman Sr. 1 Seth Smith 6
Ford	David Gilliland Racing	17	Ryan Preece 10	Chad Johnston 16; Mike Hillman Sr. 1 Seth Smith 6
Ford	David Gilliland Racing	17	Taylor Gray 8	Chad Johnston 16; Mike Hillman Sr. 1 Seth Smith 6
Ford	David Gilliland Racing	17	Harrison Burton 2	Chad Johnston 16; Mike Hillman Sr. 1 Seth Smith 6
Ford	David Gilliland Racing	17	Todd Gilliland 1	Chad Johnston 16; Mike Hillman Sr. 1 Seth Smith 6
Ford	Front Row Motorsports	38	Zane Smith	Chris Lawson
Toyota	Halmar Friesen Racing	52	Stewart Friesen (Note: Bubba Wallace qualified the No. 52 truck for Stewart Friesen at Kansas in May due to Friesen's plane flights to the track being cancelled and delayed multiple times.)	Jon Leonard
Toyota	Hattori Racing Enterprises	16	Tyler Ankrum	Scott Zipadelli
Toyota	Hattori Racing Enterprises	61	Chase Purdy	Matt Lucas
Toyota	Hill Motorsports	56	Timmy Hill	Greg Ely 18; Terry Elmore 5
Toyota	Kyle Busch Motorsports	4	John Hunter Nemechek	Eric Phillips
Toyota	Kyle Busch Motorsports	18	Chandler Smith	Danny Stockman Jr.
Toyota	Kyle Busch Motorsports	51	Corey Heim (R) 16	Mardy Lindley
Toyota	Kyle Busch Motorsports	51	Kyle Busch 5	Mardy Lindley
Toyota	Kyle Busch Motorsports	51	Buddy Kofoid 2	Mardy Lindley
Toyota	ThorSport Racing	66	Ty Majeski	Joe Shear Jr.
Toyota	ThorSport Racing	88	Matt Crafton	Jeff Hensley 14; Bud Haefele 3 Shane Wilson 6
Toyota	ThorSport Racing	98	Christian Eckes	Jeriod Prince
Toyota	ThorSport Racing	99	Ben Rhodes	Rich Lushes
Toyota 15 Chevrolet 8	Reaume Brothers Racing	33	Jason White 2	John Reaume 4 Gregory Rayl 1 Josh Reaume 2 Teddy Brown 16
Toyota 15 Chevrolet 8	Reaume Brothers Racing	33	Loris Hezemans 1	John Reaume 4 Gregory Rayl 1 Josh Reaume 2 Teddy Brown 16
Toyota 15 Chevrolet 8	Reaume Brothers Racing	33	Chris Hacker 4	John Reaume 4 Gregory Rayl 1 Josh Reaume 2 Teddy Brown 16
Toyota 15 Chevrolet 8	Reaume Brothers Racing	33	Will Rodgers 1	John Reaume 4 Gregory Rayl 1 Josh Reaume 2 Teddy Brown 16
Toyota 15 Chevrolet 8	Reaume Brothers Racing	33	Chase Janes 1	John Reaume 4 Gregory Rayl 1 Josh Reaume 2 Teddy Brown 16
Toyota 15 Chevrolet 8	Reaume Brothers Racing	33	Mike Marlar 1	John Reaume 4 Gregory Rayl 1 Josh Reaume 2 Teddy Brown 16
Toyota 15 Chevrolet 8	Reaume Brothers Racing	33	Josh Reaume 5	John Reaume 4 Gregory Rayl 1 Josh Reaume 2 Teddy Brown 16
Toyota 15 Chevrolet 8	Reaume Brothers Racing	33	Mason Maggio 2	John Reaume 4 Gregory Rayl 1 Josh Reaume 2 Teddy Brown 16
Toyota 15 Chevrolet 8	Reaume Brothers Racing	33	Jade Buford 1	John Reaume 4 Gregory Rayl 1 Josh Reaume 2 Teddy Brown 16
Toyota 15 Chevrolet 8	Reaume Brothers Racing	33	Brayton Laster 1	John Reaume 4 Gregory Rayl 1 Josh Reaume 2 Teddy Brown 16
Toyota 15 Chevrolet 8	Reaume Brothers Racing	33	Kenko Miura 1	John Reaume 4 Gregory Rayl 1 Josh Reaume 2 Teddy Brown 16
Toyota 15 Chevrolet 8	Reaume Brothers Racing	33	Nick Leitz 2	John Reaume 4 Gregory Rayl 1 Josh Reaume 2 Teddy Brown 16
Toyota 15 Chevrolet 8	Reaume Brothers Racing	33	Keith McGee 1	John Reaume 4 Gregory Rayl 1 Josh Reaume 2 Teddy Brown 16
Chevrolet 10 Toyota 13	Reaume Brothers Racing	43	Thad Moffitt 3	Andrew Abbott
Chevrolet 10 Toyota 13	Reaume Brothers Racing	43	Brad Perez 2	Gregory Rayl 15; Teddy Brown 3 Pedro Lopez 1
Chevrolet 10 Toyota 13	Reaume Brothers Racing	43	Blake Lothian 3	Gregory Rayl 15; Teddy Brown 3 Pedro Lopez 1
Chevrolet 10 Toyota 13	Reaume Brothers Racing	43	Keith McGee 2	Gregory Rayl 15; Teddy Brown 3 Pedro Lopez 1
Chevrolet 10 Toyota 13	Reaume Brothers Racing	43	Akinori Ogata 1	Gregory Rayl 15; Teddy Brown 3 Pedro Lopez 1
Chevrolet 10 Toyota 13	Reaume Brothers Racing	43	Jesse Iwuji 1	Gregory Rayl 15; Teddy Brown 3 Pedro Lopez 1
Chevrolet 10 Toyota 13	Reaume Brothers Racing	43	Armani Williams 3	Gregory Rayl 15; Teddy Brown 3 Pedro Lopez 1
Chevrolet 10 Toyota 13	Reaume Brothers Racing	43	Devon Rouse 1	Gregory Rayl 15; Teddy Brown 3 Pedro Lopez 1
Chevrolet 10 Toyota 13	Reaume Brothers Racing	43	Nick Leitz 1	Gregory Rayl 15; Teddy Brown 3 Pedro Lopez 1
Chevrolet 10 Toyota 13	Reaume Brothers Racing	43	Stephen Mallozzi 1	Gregory Rayl 15; Teddy Brown 3 Pedro Lopez 1
Chevrolet 10 Toyota 13	Reaume Brothers Racing	43	Josh Reaume 1 (Note: After Maggio failed to qualify for the race at Richmond (race 18) in the Peck Motorsports No. 96, he replaced Josh Reaume in the Reaume Brothers Racing No. 43 due to Reaume suffering a back injury earlier in the week.)	Gregory Rayl 15; Teddy Brown 3 Pedro Lopez 1
Chevrolet 10 Toyota 13	Reaume Brothers Racing	43	Mason Maggio 2	Gregory Rayl 15; Teddy Brown 3 Pedro Lopez 1
Chevrolet 10 Toyota 13	Reaume Brothers Racing	43	Natalie Decker 1	Gregory Rayl 15; Teddy Brown 3 Pedro Lopez 1
Chevrolet 10 Toyota 13	Reaume Brothers Racing	43	Chris Hacker 1	Josh Reaume

=== Limited schedule ===
Manufacturer	Team	No.	Race driver	Crew chief	Rounds
Chevrolet	AM Racing	22	Austin Wayne Self	Ryan Salomon 13; Jamie Jones 9	17
Chevrolet	AM Racing	22	Brett Moffitt	Ryan Salomon 13; Jamie Jones 9	2
Chevrolet	AM Racing	22	Max Gutiérrez (Note: Entries are fielded in a collaboration with Rette Jones Racing.)	Ryan Salomon 13; Jamie Jones 9	3
Chevrolet	AM Racing	37	Logan Bearden	Jamie Jones	1
Chevrolet	AM Racing	37	Max Gutiérrez	Jamie Jones	1
Chevrolet	Atwell Racing	79	John Atwell	Dustin Exline	1
Chevrolet	Bret Holmes Racing	32	Bret Holmes	Shane Huffman	9
Chevrolet	Bret Holmes Racing	32	Connor Mosack	Shane Huffman	2
Chevrolet	CR7 Motorsports	97	Jason Kitzmiller	Todd Myers	1
Chevrolet	FDNY Racing	28	Bryan Dauzat	Jim Rosenblum	3
Chevrolet	Jordan Anderson Racing	3	Jordan Anderson	Teddy Brown 3 Arthur Haire 3	6
Chevrolet	Jordan Anderson Racing	3	Dylan Westbrook	Jordan Anderson	1
Chevrolet	McAnally–Hilgemann Racing	35	Jake Garcia	Chad Norris	6
Chevrolet	Niece Motorsports	41	Ross Chastain	Cody Efaw	5
Chevrolet	Niece Motorsports	41	Tyler Carpenter	Cody Sommer	1
Chevrolet	Niece Motorsports	41	Justin Marks	Wally Rogers	1
Chevrolet	Niece Motorsports	41	Chad Chastain	Wally Rogers	1
Chevrolet	Niece Motorsports	44	Kris Wright	Wally Rogers 19; Darren Fraley 3	17
Chevrolet	Niece Motorsports	44	Chad Chastain	Wally Rogers 19; Darren Fraley 3	2
Chevrolet	Niece Motorsports	44	Bayley Currey	Wally Rogers 19; Darren Fraley 3	3
Chevrolet	Norm Benning Racing	6	Norm Benning	Mark Tolbert 1 Daniel Killius 3	4
Chevrolet	Peck Motorsports	96	Mason Maggio	Todd Peck	1
Chevrolet	Rackley W.A.R.	26	Tate Fogleman	Willie Allen	3
Chevrolet	Sparks Motorsports	53	Braden Mitchell	Mike Hillman Sr.	1
Chevrolet	Spire Motorsports	7	Austin Hill	Kevin Manion	2
Chevrolet	Spire Motorsports	7	Alex Bowman	Kevin Manion	2
Chevrolet	Spire Motorsports	7	William Byron	Kevin Manion	1
Chevrolet	Spire Motorsports	7	Chase Elliott	Kevin Manion	1
Chevrolet	Spire Motorsports	7	Rajah Caruth	Kevin Manion	4
Chevrolet	Spire Motorsports	7	Dylan Lupton	Kevin Manion	1
Chevrolet	Trey Hutchens Racing	14	Trey Hutchens	Bobby Hutchens	4
Ford	CMI Motorsports (Note: Entry was fielded in a collaboration with G2G Racing.)	49	Andrew Gordon	Tim Silva	1
Ford	David Gilliland Racing	54	Joey Logano	Mike Hillman Sr.	1
Toyota	Cook Racing Technologies	84	Clay Greenfield	Tucker Wingo	4
Toyota	G2G Racing	46	Matt Jaskol	Tim Silva 16; Kevin Eagle 2	4 (Note: At Las Vegas (race 2), Jaskol, who was scheduled to drive G2G's No. 46 truck full-time, moved to the team's No. 47 truck for this race only while Brennan Poole drove the No. 46. When Poole qualified for the race and Jaskol did not, G2G moved Jaskol back to the No. 46 replacing Poole, which is why both Poole and Jaskol are listed in the No. 46 at Las Vegas (race 2).)
Toyota	G2G Racing	46	Brennan Poole	Tim Silva 16; Kevin Eagle 2	7
Toyota	G2G Racing	46	Kaden Honeycutt	Tim Silva 16; Kevin Eagle 2	1
Toyota	G2G Racing	46	Ryan Huff	Tim Silva 16; Kevin Eagle 2	1
Toyota	G2G Racing	46	Stefan Parsons (Note: At Sonoma (race 12), Mason Filippi drove the No. 46 truck in practice before being replaced by Stefan Parsons for qualifying and the race. Parsons was going to drive G2G's No. 47 truck, replacing Travis McCullough, due to McCullough's drug test results not coming through in time for practice. The No. 47 later withdrew and Parsons was moved to the No. 46 replacing Filippi.)	Tim Silva 16; Kevin Eagle 2	1
Toyota	G2G Racing	46	Bryson Mitchell	Tim Silva 16; Kevin Eagle 2	1
Toyota	G2G Racing	46	Chase Janes	Tim Silva 16; Kevin Eagle 2	1
Toyota	G2G Racing	46	Mason Filippi	Tim Silva 16; Kevin Eagle 2	1
Toyota	G2G Racing	46	Tim Viens	Tim Silva 16; Kevin Eagle 2	1
Toyota	G2G Racing	47	Johnny Sauter	Tim Viens 2 Tim Silva 2 Kevin Eagle 1	1
Toyota	G2G Racing	47	Matt Jaskol	Tim Viens 2 Tim Silva 2 Kevin Eagle 1	1
Toyota	G2G Racing	47	Brennan Poole	Tim Viens 2 Tim Silva 2 Kevin Eagle 1	1
Toyota	G2G Racing	47	Samuel LeComte	Tim Viens 2 Tim Silva 2 Kevin Eagle 1	1
Toyota	G2G Racing	47	Kaden Honeycutt	Tim Viens 2 Tim Silva 2 Kevin Eagle 1	1
Toyota	Halmar Friesen Racing	62	Todd Bodine	Tripp Bruce	6
Toyota	Halmar Friesen Racing	62	Jessica Friesen	Tripp Bruce	2
Toyota	Halmar Friesen Racing	62	Layne Riggs	Tripp Bruce	3
Toyota	Hill Motorsports	5	Tyler Hill	Terry Elmore 6 Greg Ely 3	9
Toyota	On Point Motorsports	30	Tate Fogleman	Steven Lane 3 William Brafford 19	11
Toyota	On Point Motorsports	30	Josh Bilicki (Note: At Sonoma (race 12), Bilicki drove the No. 30 in place of Colin Garrett due to Garrett's drug test results not coming through in time for practice.)	Steven Lane 3 William Brafford 19	1
Toyota	On Point Motorsports	30	Joey Gase	Steven Lane 3 William Brafford 19	1
Toyota	On Point Motorsports	30	Camden Murphy	Steven Lane 3 William Brafford 19	1
Toyota	On Point Motorsports	30	Kaden Honeycutt	Steven Lane 3 William Brafford 19	7
Toyota	On Point Motorsports	30	Chris Hacker	Steven Lane 3 William Brafford 19	1
Toyota	TC Motorsports	90	Justin Carroll	Terry Carroll	5
Toyota	ThorSport Racing	13	Johnny Sauter	Junior Joiner	4
Chevrolet 7 Toyota 5	Henderson Motorsports	75	Parker Kligerman	Chris Carrier	12
Chevrolet 2 Ford 1	Jennifer Jo Cobb Racing	10	Jennifer Jo Cobb	Rick Lind 2 Joe Majenski 1	3

=== Changes ===
==== Teams ====
- On April 30, 2021, Bill McAnally Racing West Series driver Cole Moore revealed that McAnally–Hilgemann Racing, the Truck Series team Bill McAnally co-owns, may expand to two teams full-time in 2022. On September 9, MHR announced that Colby Howard would drive full-time for the team in 2022 and it would most likely be in the team's new second truck. Howard previously drove the No. 15 for JD Motorsports in the Xfinity Series part-time in 2020 and full-time in 2021 until September, the Truck Series part-time in 2019 and 2021 for Young's Motorsports and CR7 Motorsports respectively, and the ARCA Menards Series in 2018 and 2019 for Mason Mitchell Motorsports and Win-Tron Racing respectively.
- On May 27, 2021, Tim Viens announced plans to field his own Truck Series team for the 2022 season, G2G Racing, after buying some Toyotas from Kyle Busch Motorsports. On February 3, 2022, the team announced that they would be fielding two full-time trucks, the Nos. 46 and 47. Matt Jaskol, who made his NASCAR debut in 2021 in the Xfinity Series with MBM Motorsports, would make his Truck Series debut and drive the No. 46 full-time while Viens, Johnny Sauter, Roger Reuse and other drivers would share the No. 47.
- On July 6, 2021, AM Racing team president Kevin Cywinski stated that his team would like to field a second truck (the No. 37) full-time, as it is part of their "long-term strategy". The team has run a second truck twice, the No. 32 at Daytona in 2017 with Austin Wayne Self driving (when J. J. Yeley drove Self's normal No. 22) and the No. 37 at Knoxville in 2021 with Brett Moffitt driving. On March 21, 2022, AM Racing confirmed that it would field a second part-time truck, the No. 37, starting with Logan Bearden in the race at COTA. The truck will be driven by other drivers in other races later in the season. On May 26, it was announced that Max Gutiérrez would drive the truck part-time in a collaboration with Rette Jones Racing starting at Charlotte.
- On November 23, 2021, Cup Series team Spire Motorsports announced plans to expand to the Truck Series in 2022. At the time, the team had yet to determine if they would field their one truck full-time or part-time and who their driver(s) would be. The team would field the No. 7 truck part-time with Austin Hill driving it at Daytona, Alex Bowman driving it at COTA, and William Byron driving it to the race win at Martinsville.
- On December 1, 2021, Hattori Racing Enterprises announced that they would expand to a two-truck operation in 2022, with the No. 61, driven by Chase Purdy, as its new second full-time truck.
- On December 2, 2021, David Gilliland revealed in an interview with Dustin Albino from Jayski that his David Gilliland Racing team would field three full-time trucks in 2022. The No. 17, which was previously a part-time truck, will now be fielded full-time with Taylor Gray continuing to drive part-time along with other drivers sharing the ride with him.
- On December 6, 2021, Hill Motorsports announced that they would expand to a two-truck operation in 2022. The second truck will be fielded full-time with multiple drivers sharing the ride. The drivers, the number and the crew chief of the second truck have not been announced yet.
- On December 7, 2021, it was announced that GMS Racing would be downsizing from 5 full-time trucks to 2 in 2022 as a result of the team expanding into the Cup Series through their acquisition of the majority of Richard Petty Motorsports. The trucks that were closed down are the Nos. 2, 21 and 26. The drivers of those trucks in 2021 (Sheldon Creed, Zane Smith and Tyler Ankrum, respectively) all left the team. The team sold the 2021 owner points from those trucks to GMS-affiliated teams, with the Reaume Brothers Racing Nos. 33 and 43 trucks getting the owner points from the GMS Nos. 23 and 24 trucks and the new McAnally–Hilgemann Racing No. 91 truck getting the owner points from the closed GMS No. 26 truck. GMS transferred the owner points from the Nos. 2 and 21 trucks (which were closed down) to their Nos. 23 and 24 trucks.
- On December 23, 2021, CR7 Motorsports announced that their No. 9 truck would run the full season with Blaine Perkins driving. Although the No. 9 truck ran almost all the races in 2020 and 2021, 2022 will mark the first season it has been fielded full-time. On February 10, CR7 announced that they would field a second truck, the No. 97, part-time in 2022 with their ARCA driver Jason Kitzmiller attempting to qualify for the season-opener at Daytona.
- On April 15, 2022, NASCAR notified G2G Racing that the chassis for their No. 46 truck for the Bristol dirt race was registered to CMI Motorsports (who G2G had purchased the truck from). As a result, G2G owner Tim Viens had to withdraw the No. 46 truck, which was to be driven by Andrew Gordon, from the race. Viens then phone called CMI owner Ray Ciccarelli who agreed to file a late entry and field the No. 49 truck for Gordon in the race.

==== Drivers ====
- On June 12, 2021, Reaume Brothers Racing stated that Lawless Alan could run a full season for their team in 2022. He drove part-time for RBR and Niece Motorsports in 2021. On November 4, Niece Motorsports announced that Alan would drive the No. 45 full-time in 2022.
- On July 16, 2021, 2020 Truck Series champion Sheldon Creed stated in an interview that he would like to move up to the Xfinity Series full-time in 2022. He has driven full-time for GMS Racing in the No. 2 full-time since 2019. On September 14, it was announced that Creed would drive full-time for Richard Childress Racing in the Xfinity Series in 2022.
- On August 8, 2021, Matt DiBenedetto, who lost his full-time Cup Series ride with the Wood Brothers to Harrison Burton for 2022, stated in an interview that he would "entertain anything" when it comes to his 2022 plans, which means that he was open to moving down to the Xfinity or Truck Series full-time. On January 6, 2022, Rackley W.A.R. announced that DiBenedetto would drive their No. 25 truck full-time in 2022.
- On August 26, 2021, it was announced that Jack Wood, who drove most of the season in the GMS Racing No. 24 truck in 2021 after the team released Raphaël Lessard during the season due to lack of funding, would return to the team in 2022 to run full-time in the No. 24 truck.
- On September 2, 2021, Jerry Freeze, the general manager of Front Row Motorsports, stated in an interview with Dave Moody on SiriusXM NASCAR Radio that the team was considering starting an Xfinity Series team in 2022 and if they do so, Todd Gilliland, FRM's Truck Series driver, could move up to that series and drive that car full-time. Anthony Alfredo, one of FRM's Cup Series drivers who was rumored to lose his Cup Series ride as a result of FRM being rumored to close down his No. 38 car and sell the car's charter to 23XI Racing (which fell through), was rumored as Gilliland's replacement in the FRM No. 38 truck or for the FRM Xfinity Series car with Gilliland remaining in the Truck Series. However, the team confirmed on November 9 that Alfredo would not be driving for them in 2022 regardless of series. On November 30, FRM announced that Gilliland would move up to the Cup Series for the team in their No. 38 car while Zane Smith would leave GMS Racing to replace Gilliland in the No. 38 truck in 2022.
- On September 18, 2021, Marcus Lemonis, the CEO of series title sponsor Camping World, tweeted that he would like to see two-time Truck Series champion and NASCAR on Fox analyst Todd Bodine return to the series to run six races in order to reach 800 starts in NASCAR's top three series. If 800 fans tweeted their approval, Lemonis and Camping World would sponsor him in these six races. The goal was reached on October 1, making the deal official. On December 13, it was announced that Bodine would run his six races in a second truck for Stewart Friesen's Halmar Friesen Racing team. The team fielded a second truck, the No. 62, for Stewart's wife Jessica Friesen in the two dirt races in 2021. On February 16, Bodine revealed in a tweet that the No. 62 will also be his number.
- On October 1, 2021, GMS Racing announced that Grant Enfinger would drive their No. 23 truck full-time in 2022 and 2023, replacing Chase Purdy. He returns to the team after previously driving for them in ARCA in 2014 and 2015, where he won the 2015 championship. He also drove part-time for GMS in the Truck Series in 2016 where he won at Talladega. Enfinger drove the No. 98 for ThorSport Racing full-time from 2017 to 2020 and part-time in that truck and the No. 9 for CR7 Motorsports in 2021. On November 30, it was announced that Purdy would driving a new second full-time truck for Hattori Racing Enterprises, the No. 61.
- On October 2, 2021, Jamie Little revealed during the NASCAR on Fox pre-race show for the race at Talladega that Austin Hill will not be returning to Hattori Racing Enterprises in 2022. On October 29, it was announced that Hill would drive full-time for Richard Childress Racing in the Xfinity Series in 2022. On December 1, 2021, HRE announced that Tyler Ankrum would move over from the GMS Racing No. 26 truck to replace Hill in the No. 16 in 2022.
- On October 2, 2021, the MAVTV broadcasters calling the ARCA Menards Series race at Salem mentioned that Corey Heim would run full-time in the Truck Series in 2022 although Heim's 2022 plans had yet to be announced. On December 21, it was announced that Heim would run the majority of the season (15 races) in the No. 51 for Kyle Busch Motorsports. He drove full-time in the main ARCA Series for Venturini Motorsports and part-time in the Truck Series (3 races) for KBM in 2021.
- On November 2, 2021, Niece Motorsports announced that Dean Thompson would drive full-time for the team in the Truck Series in 2022. He drove the team's No. 44 truck in the 2021 season-finale at Phoenix as well as their No. 40 car in the ARCA Menards Series season-finale at Kansas. After Kris Wright was announced to drive the No. 44, Thompson drove the No. 40 truck, replacing Ryan Truex.
- On November 30, 2021, On Point Motorsports announced that Tate Fogleman would drive the team's No. 30 truck full-time in 2022. He drove the No. 12 for Young's Motorsports full-time in 2021 and scored an upset win at Talladega. On June 8, 2022, it was announced that Colin Garrett would drive the No. 30 truck at Sonoma instead of Fogleman. However, on June 10, Garrett had to be replaced due to his drug test results not coming in in time for practice. (As it was his first start of the season, he had to take a drug test beforehand.) Josh Bilicki drove the No. 30 truck in qualifying and the race. Joey Gase would be in the 30 car at Knoxville, instead of his planned No. 31 car. Camden Murphy, who last competed for NEMCO Motorsports and Spencer Davis Motorsports, drove the car at Nashville. Kaden Honeycutt, who drove for G2G Racing earlier this year, would attempt 3 races for the team. Chris Hacker would return to the team at IRP.
- On December 1, 2021, Niece Motorsports announced that the winner of the 2021 Castrol Gateway Dirt Nationals Super Late Model race on December 4 would drive one of the team's trucks at Knoxville. Tyler Carpenter won the race that night, giving him the opportunity to drive for Niece in the Truck Series. With Niece having announced four full-time drivers for 2022, Carpenter would drive a fifth part-time truck for the team. On March 3, 2022, Niece announced that the number of their part-time fifth truck would be the No. 41 and that it would be fielded part-time for Ross Chastain in select races beginning at Atlanta, which was the first time the team fielded five trucks in a race. On July 1, the team announced that Justin Marks, the owner of the Cup Series team Trackhouse, would come out of his NASCAR driving retirement to drive the No. 41 at Mid-Ohio.
- On December 7, 2021, Niece Motorsports announced that Kris Wright would drive the No. 44 in 2022. Wright previously drove the No. 02 for Young's Motorsports part-time in 2021. On August 9, 2022, Wright parted ways with Niece Motorsports, with Chad Chastain replacing him at Richmond.
- On December 22, 2021, Young's Motorsports announced that Jesse Little would run at least 12 races for the team with the possibility of more races being added. He previously drove the No. 78 for B. J. McLeod Motorsports in the Xfinity Series for most of the 2021 season.
- On December 23, 2021, CR7 Motorsports announced that Blaine Perkins would drive their No. 9 truck full-time in 2022. Perkins drove the No. 23 car for Our Motorsports in the Xfinity Series part-time in 2021. This will be his debut in the Truck Series.
- On February 3, 2022, it was announced that Matt Jaskol would drive full-time for G2G Racing in their new No. 46 truck in 2022. Jaskol made his NASCAR debut in 2021 driving part-time for MBM Motorsports in the Xfinity Series. On April 7, Jaskol revealed in a tweet that he had parted ways with G2G. Prior to the Martinsville race, G2G suspended Jaskol's contract due to a disagreement between the team and Jaskol's sponsor AutoParts4Less.com.
- On March 22, 2022, AM Racing announced that Logan Bearden would attempt to make his Truck Series debut at COTA in their part-time No. 37 truck at COTA. He failed to qualify for the same race in 2021 for Niece Motorsports in the No. 44 truck. On May 26, the team announced that ARCA and NASCAR Mexico Series driver Max Gutiérrez would make his Truck Series debut in the No. 37 truck at Charlotte in a collaboration with his ARCA team, Rette Jones Racing, and would run additional races later in the season. The two teams collaborated to field the No. 32 car for Gutiérrez in the main ARCA Series season-opener at Daytona.
- On March 26, 2022, Cup Series driver Joey Logano announced he would be driving a truck in the Pinty's Dirt Truck Race at Bristol. On that same day, Bob Pockrass from Fox reported that he saw Logano enter a David Gilliland Racing hauler. He would drive the No. 54 in the race.
- On April 6, 2022, it was announced that William Byron would drive the Spire Motorsports No. 7 truck at Martinsville.
- On May 30, 2022, it was announced that late model racing driver Mason Maggio would make his Truck Series debut for Reaume Brothers Racing in the No. 33 truck in the race at Gateway. Maggio drove for RBR again at Richmond after failing to qualify for the race in the Peck Motorsports No. 96 truck. He replaced team owner Josh Reaume, who did qualify for the race, in the No. 43 truck after Reaume suffered a back injury while working in the team's race shop earlier in the week.
- On June 4, 2022, G2G Racing owner Tim Viens revealed to Mark Kristl from Frontstretch that Mason Filippi and Travis McCullough would both attempt to make their Truck Series debuts at Sonoma in the team's Nos. 46 and 47 trucks, respectively. However, on June 10, McCullough had to be replaced due to his drug test results not coming in in time for practice. (As it was his first start of the season, he had to take a drug test beforehand.) Stefan Parsons was going to replace him in the No. 47 truck for qualifying. However, on June 11, Parsons moved from the No. 47 to replace Filippi in the No. 46 truck in qualifying due to Filippi not adjusting to the truck well enough in practice. The No. 47 truck was withdrawn. Filippi ended up making his debut at Mid-Ohio.
- On June 7, 2022, AM Racing announced that Austin Wayne Self's wife Jennifer was expecting a baby during the Sonoma race weekend and he would not be running the race. Instead of having someone fill in for him, the team opted to withdraw the No. 22 truck and not run the race at all. Brett Moffitt replaced him at Knoxville, and Gutiérrez would opt up at Nashville and Pocono.

==== Crew chiefs ====
- On November 5, 2021, Truck Series play-by-play announcer Vince Welch from Fox reported during the broadcast of the 2021 season-finale at Phoenix that Carl Joiner Jr. (Junior Joiner) would retire from crew chiefing in NASCAR in 2022 and return to California. He was Matt Crafton's crew chief at ThorSport Racing for 10 years and won three championships with him. On February 3, 2022, ThorSport announced that Jeff Hensley, who was previously a crew chief for the team from 2014 to 2015 and again from 2017 to 2020, would return for a third stint with the team and would be Crafton's new crew chief.
- On November 11, 2021, David Gilliland Racing announced that Jerry Baxter would be the new crew chief for their No. 15 truck driven by Tanner Gray in 2022. Baxter was previously the crew chief for the No. 43 Richard Petty Motorsports Cup Series car in 2020 with Bubba Wallace and in 2021 with Erik Jones. Tanner Gray and the No. 15 truck had six different crew chiefs in 2021 (Shane Wilson, Seth Smith, Jacob Hampton, Marcus Richmond, Chad Johnston and Wes Ward). On August 9, 2022, DGR announced a crew chief swap starting at Richmond, with Baxter moving from the No. 15 to the No. 1 driven by Hailie Deegan and Mike Hillman Jr. moving from the No. 1 to the No. 15.
- On November 23, 2021, it was announced that Kevin Manion, who was the crew chief for the No. 21 truck for GMS Racing and Zane Smith in 2020 and 2021, would be leaving for Spire Motorsports to be the crew chief for their new truck.
- On December 16, 2021, it was announced that Jeff Hensley and Chad Walter, who were the crew chiefs for the Nos. 23 and 24 trucks for GMS Racing in 2022, would both be leaving to crew chief for Our Motorsports in the Xfinity Series in 2022. However, on February 3, 2022, it was announced that Hensley would instead go to ThorSport Racing to be the new crew chief for Matt Crafton's No. 88 truck. On January 25, 2022, GMS announced that Charles Denike and Tom Ackerman would be the new crew chiefs of their Nos. 23 and 24 trucks.
- On December 22, 2021, Hattori Racing Enterprises announced that Matt Lucas would be the crew chief for the team's new second truck, the No. 61, driven by Chase Purdy. He will also be the Team Manager for HRE. Lucas was previously the shop manager for Joe Gibbs Racing's Xfinity Series teams and has also served as crew chief in the Xfinity Series for JGR, SunEnergy1 Racing, RAB Racing, TriStar Motorsports and XCI Racing.
- On June 29, 2022, it was announced that Jeff Hensley, who started the season as the new crew chief for Matt Crafton and the No. 88 ThorSport Racing truck, would be going back to the GMS Racing No. 23 truck which he crew chiefed in 2021. He would replace Charles Denike as the crew chief for Grant Enfinger for the rest of 2022. Hensley crew chiefed Enfinger in the ThorSport No. 98 truck from 2017 to 2020. On July 2, it was announced that Denike would go to the GMS-aligned McAnally–Hilgemann Racing to be the crew chief for the No. 19 truck of Derek Kraus, replacing Shane Wilson. Wilson would become the crew chief of the Bassett Racing No. 77 car in the Xfinity Series and then became Crafton's new crew chief beginning at Richmond.

==== Interim crew chiefs ====
- On March 24, 2022, NASCAR indefinitely suspended Young's Motorsports No. 02 truck crew chief Eddie Troconis after he was re-arrested on March 18 as a result of his assault charge (which came after he fought and injured spotter Clayton Hughes during the 2021 Chevrolet Silverado 250 race weekend at Talladega Superspeedway) being re-instated by a grand jury in Alabama. (Troconis was suspended for the last two races of 2021 but reinstated before the 2022 season after the charges were dropped by a prosecutor in February.) Steven Dawson has served as the interim crew chief for the No. 02 truck, driven by Jesse Little and Kaz Grala, since Tronconis' suspension started.
- On June 24, 2022, McAnally–Hilgemann Racing No. 19 truck crew chief Shane Wilson was suspended for that day's race at Nashville due to an improperly installed ballast. It is unclear who filled in for Wilson as Derek Kraus' interim crew chief in the race.
- On October 5, 2022, NASCAR indefinitely suspended Young's Motorsports No. 20 truck crew chief Andrew Abbott after he violated the behavioral policy in the NASCAR rulebook. The team has yet to announce an interim crew chief.

==== Manufacturers ====
- On September 23, 2021, NASCAR announced that the trucks of each manufacturer would have new body updates to their noses and tails that would more closely resemble the street versions of those trucks. Ford unveiled their new body update on the same day and Toyota unveiled theirs on the next day. Chevrolet unveiled their new body update on October 29.
- On October 13, 2021, it was announced that McAnally–Hilgemann Racing would be switching to Chevrolet and would have an alliance with GMS Racing in 2022. They previously were a Toyota team and had an alliance with Hattori Racing Enterprises.
- On December 6, 2021, Hill Motorsports announced that they would be switching from Chevrolet to Toyota in 2022.
- On December 23, 2021, it was announced that CR7 Motorsports would have a technical alliance with GMS Racing in 2022.

== Rule changes ==
- On November 19, 2021, NASCAR announced the new practice and qualifying formats across all three national series in 2022. The formats are as follows:

- Paved oval races: After a 20-minute practice period, all trucks will run a single qualifying lap (two laps at Martinsville, Bristol, Richmond, and Dover).
- Daytona and Talladega: All trucks run one lap each, with the top 10 transferring to the final round.
- Road courses: After a 20-minute practice period, the field will be separated into two groups, each running a 15-minute timed session. The top five of each group will advance to the final round, which consists of a 10-minute timed session.
- Dirt tracks: Four qualifying races will determine the starting lineup.
- Daytona, Atlanta, Bristol dirt, Knoxville, Sonoma, Mid-Ohio, Nashville, and the Phoenix season ending race will have one 50-minute practice session.

- On March 11, 2022, NASCAR announced that the reconfigured Atlanta Motor Speedway will enforce track limits, currently implemented on Daytona International Speedway and Talladega Superspeedway.
- The race at Gateway will no longer utilize special restrictions on pit lane, as it will be held jointly with the Cup Series race at the circuit. Pit restrictions will be implemented at Mid-Ohio, a standalone race, and dirt pit restrictions will be in effect at both dirt races.

== Schedule ==
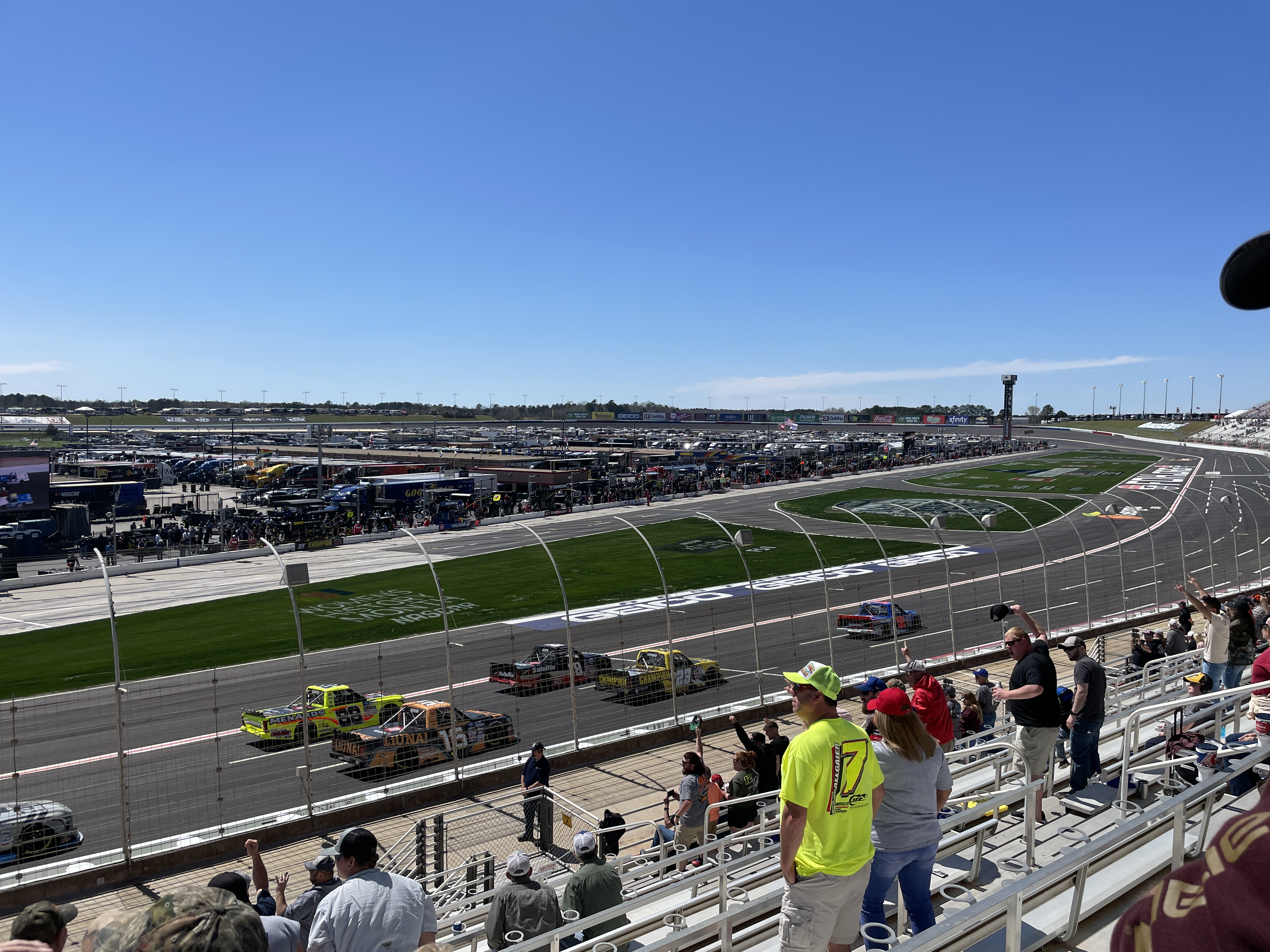
The Fr8 208 at Atlanta Motor Speedway in March

The 2022 season schedule was announced on September 29, 2021.

Note: The Triple Truck Challenge races are listed in bold.

No	Race title	Track	Location	Date
1	NextEra Energy 250	Daytona International Speedway	Daytona Beach, Florida	February 18
2	Victoria's Voice Foundation 200	Las Vegas Motor Speedway	Las Vegas, Nevada	March 4
3	Fr8 208	Atlanta Motor Speedway	Hampton, Georgia	March 19
4	XPEL 225	Circuit of the Americas	Austin, Texas	March 26
5	Blue Emu Maximum Pain Relief 200	Martinsville Speedway	Ridgeway, Virginia	April 7
6	Pinty's Dirt Truck Race	Bristol Motor Speedway (Dirt)	Bristol, Tennessee	April 16
7	Dead On Tools 200	Darlington Raceway	Darlington, South Carolina	May 6
8	Heart of America 200	Kansas Speedway	Kansas City, Kansas	May 14
9	SpeedyCash.com 220	Texas Motor Speedway	Fort Worth, Texas	May 20
10	North Carolina Education Lottery 200	Charlotte Motor Speedway	Concord, North Carolina	May 27
11	**Toyota 200 presented by CK Power**	World Wide Technology Raceway	Madison, Illinois	June 4
12	DoorDash 250	Sonoma Raceway	Sonoma, California	June 11
13	Clean Harbors 150	Knoxville Raceway	Knoxville, Iowa	June 18
14	**Rackley Roofing 200**	Nashville Superspeedway	Lebanon, Tennessee	June 24
15	**O'Reilly Auto Parts 150 at Mid-Ohio**	Mid-Ohio Sports Car Course, Lexington, Ohio	Lexington, Ohio	July 9
16	CRC Brakleen 150	Pocono Raceway	Long Pond, Pennsylvania	July 23
NASCAR Camping World Truck Series Playoffs
Round of 10
17	TSport 200	Lucas Oil Indianapolis Raceway Park	Brownsburg, Indiana	July 29
18	Worldwide Express 250 for Carrier Appreciation	Richmond Raceway	Richmond, Virginia	August 13
19	Kansas Lottery 200	Kansas Speedway	Kansas City, Kansas	September 9
Round of 8
20	UNOH 200 presented by Ohio Logistics	Bristol Motor Speedway	Bristol, Tennessee	September 15
21	Chevrolet Silverado 250	Talladega Superspeedway	Lincoln, Alabama	October 1
22	Baptist Health 200	Homestead–Miami Speedway	Homestead, Florida	October 22
Championship 4
23	Lucas Oil 150	Phoenix Raceway	Avondale, Arizona	November 4

=== Schedule changes ===
There is one more race on the schedule, as it now contains 23 races instead of 22 from 2021.

- After a 23-year absence, Sonoma returns to the schedule for the first time since 1998 and after a 10-year absence, Lucas Oil Indianapolis Raceway Park also returned to the schedule, becoming a playoff race.
- Mid-Ohio earned a Truck Series race and will host the Truck Series for the first time in series history, after losing their date in Xfinity Series. Kansas also earned a 2nd date permanently, in the playoff, after being added in 2020 as a replacement due to COVID-19 pandemic.
- Homestead Miami returned to the schedule after being removed due to logistical reasons in 2021 after the Auto Club Speedway Cup and Xfinity races were canceled because of state restrictions.
- The two pandemic-related changes midway through the season, the second Daytona International Speedway (road course) and Darlington Raceway (playoff) races, which were added because of pandemic-related restrictions, were removed. NASCAR permanently removed the Canadian Tire Motorsport Park event that had been replaced by Darlington each of the past two seasons.
- Watkins Glen and the 2nd Las Vegas (the playoff one) races were also removed from the schedule permanently.
- As for other slight realignments, Martinsville will go from the fall to the spring date and Richmond will go from the spring to the summer date.

== Results and standings ==
=== Race results ===
No.	Race	Pole position	Most laps led	Winning driver	Manufacturer	No.	Winning team	Report
1	NextEra Energy 250	Ty Majeski	John Hunter Nemechek	Zane Smith	Ford	38	Front Row Motorsports	Report
2	Victoria's Voice Foundation 200	John Hunter Nemechek	Chandler Smith	Chandler Smith	Toyota	18	Kyle Busch Motorsports	Report
3	Fr8 208	Chandler Smith	Stewart Friesen	Corey Heim	Toyota	51	Kyle Busch Motorsports	Report
4	XPEL 225	Sheldon Creed	Kyle Busch	Zane Smith	Ford	38	Front Row Motorsports	Report
5	Blue Emu Maximum Pain Relief 200	Zane Smith	William Byron	William Byron	Chevrolet	7	Spire Motorsports	Report
6	Pinty's Dirt Truck Race	Joey Logano	Ben Rhodes	Ben Rhodes	Toyota	99	ThorSport Racing	Report
7	Dead On Tools 200	John Hunter Nemechek	John Hunter Nemechek	John Hunter Nemechek	Toyota	4	Kyle Busch Motorsports	Report
8	Heart of America 200	John Hunter Nemechek	Zane Smith	Zane Smith	Ford	38	Front Row Motorsports	Report
9	SpeedyCash.com 220	John Hunter Nemechek	Stewart Friesen	Stewart Friesen	Toyota	52	Halmar Friesen Racing	Report
10	North Carolina Education Lottery 200	Ty Majeski	Carson Hocevar	Ross Chastain	Chevrolet	41	Niece Motorsports	Report
11	Toyota 200 presented by CK Power	Corey Heim	Ben Rhodes	Corey Heim	Toyota	51	Kyle Busch Motorsports	Report
12	DoorDash 250	Carson Hocevar	Kyle Busch	Kyle Busch	Toyota	51	Kyle Busch Motorsports	Report
13	Clean Harbors 150	Derek Kraus	Carson Hocevar	Todd Gilliland	Ford	17	David Gilliland Racing	Report
14	Rackley Roofing 200	Ryan Preece	Ryan Preece	Ryan Preece	Ford	17	David Gilliland Racing	Report
15	O'Reilly Auto Parts 150 at Mid-Ohio	Corey Heim	Parker Kligerman	Parker Kligerman	Chevrolet	75	Henderson Motorsports	Report
16	CRC Brakleen 150	Zane Smith	Chandler Smith	Chandler Smith	Toyota	18	Kyle Busch Motorsports	Report
NASCAR Camping World Truck Series Playoffs
Round of 10
17	TSport 200	John Hunter Nemechek	John Hunter Nemechek	Grant Enfinger	Chevrolet	23	GMS Racing	Report
18	Worldwide Express 250	Ty Majeski	Chandler Smith	Chandler Smith	Toyota	18	Kyle Busch Motorsports	Report
19	Kansas Lottery 200	John Hunter Nemechek	John Hunter Nemechek	John Hunter Nemechek	Toyota	4	Kyle Busch Motorsports	Report
Round of 8
20	UNOH 200	Derek Kraus	Chandler Smith	Ty Majeski	Toyota	66	ThorSport Racing	Report
21	Chevrolet Silverado 250	John Hunter Nemechek	Christian Eckes	Matt DiBenedetto	Chevrolet	25	Rackley W.A.R.	Report
22	Baptist Health 200	Ryan Preece	Ty Majeski	Ty Majeski	Toyota	66	ThorSport Racing	Report
Championship 4
23	Lucas Oil 150	Zane Smith	Zane Smith	Zane Smith	Ford	38	Front Row Motorsports	Report

=== Drivers' championship ===
(key) Bold – Pole position awarded by time. Italics – Pole position set by competition-based formula. * – Most laps led. ^{1} – Stage 1 winner. ^{2} – Stage 2 winner. ^{1-10} – Regular season top 10 finishers.
. – Eliminated after Round of 10 . – Eliminated after Round of 8

Pos.	Driver	DAY	LVS	ATL	COA	MAR	BRD	DAR	KAN	TEX	CLT	GTW	SON	KNX	NSH	MOH	POC	IRP	RCH	KAN	BRI	TAL	HOM	PHO	Pts.	Stage	Bonus
1	Zane Smith	1	36	5	1^{12}	**9**^{1}	10	8	1*^{2}	32	5^{1}	9	2	3	2^{1}	2^{2}	13	3	9	4	2	17	2^{2}	**1***^{12}	4040	–	37^{1}
2	Ben Rhodes	2	31^{12}	2	4	5^{2}	1*^{12}	25	10	27	10^{2}	8*^{2}	18^{2}	10	12	23	20	2	18	13	18	2	6^{1}	2	4035	–	17^{7}
3	Chandler Smith	21	1*	4	5	6	19	21	4	8	8	3^{1}	5	13	15	6	1*^{1}	18	1*^{2}	6	9*^{12}	14^{2}	10	3	4034	–	28^{2}
4	Ty Majeski	**7**	10	3	30	11	21	4	2	5	**13**	32	3^{1}	4	4	12	7	8^{2}	**3**^{1}	8	1	23	1*	20	4017	–	8^{6}
NASCAR Camping World Truck Series Playoffs cut-off
Pos.	Driver	DAY	LVS	ATL	COA	MAR	BRD	DAR	KAN	TEX	CLT	GTW	SON	KNX	NSH	MOH	POC	IRP	RCH	KAN	BRI	TAL	HOM	PHO	Pts.	Stage	Bonus
5	John Hunter Nemechek	24*^{12}	**25**	24^{2}	2	4	3	**1***	**6**	**6**	3	35	8	2	9	28	3	**10***^{1}	2	**1***^{12}	12	**24**^{1}	35	4	2285	38	24^{3}
6	Stewart Friesen	16	3	6*^{1}	9	13	11	12	14	1*	9	4	31	5	5	4	14	4	11	20	7	20	3	5	2276	52	13^{4}
7	Grant Enfinger	29	23	12	10	8	8	3	3	11	2	28	11	8	32	11	17	1	4	5	4	29	14	6	2266	30	7^{9}
8	Christian Eckes	3	28	16	6	12	5	17	5	2	4	2	35	12	6	5	8^{2}	16	8	10	8	5*	7	30	2230	30	7^{5}
9	Matt Crafton	27	7	25	13	7	9	5	9	9	18	12	34	7	10	18	15	9	7	15	5	22	8	12	2208	26	1^{10}
10	Carson Hocevar	9	13	27	8	17	2	2^{2}	15	4	16*	24	**6**^{‡}	35*^{1}	3	3	5	21	10	2	19	28	12	10	2186	24	5^{8}
11	Derek Kraus	26	24	9	12	14	29	19	8	36	12	7	27	**6**	11	8	9	14	12	21	**6**	13	15	11	595	106	-10
12	Tyler Ankrum	28	16	11	7	10	31	9	16	33	20	13	9	9	7	21	16	6	13	14	11	10	11	14	583	67	–
13	Matt DiBenedetto	10	6	30	31	15	35	11	7	10	17	6	10	14	31	19	12	11	17	12	27	1	19	22	521	39	–
14	Corey Heim **(R)**	32		1				23	33^{1}	7		**1**			33	**26**	4	5	5	7	10	26	5	7	505	130	11
15	Tanner Gray	4	5	8	17	21	15	34	18	24	6	30	13	22	30	20	10	23	16	16	17	31	25	8	487	49	–
16	Chase Purdy	DNQ	14	14	16	29	13	35	13	21	15	10	15	20	13	13	11	27	14	25	30	7	16	19	450	26	–
17	Colby Howard	30	34	26	24	18	12	13	11	34	14	23	19	16	16	9	18	32	28	9	24	8	13	15	422	17	–
18	Ryan Preece		4	7				7		3^{12}	11				**1***^{2}		2			3		4	4		410	81	8
19	Parker Kligerman	5			19	16	4	6^{1}					7		20	1*^{1}				11	3	9	9		400	62	7
20	Timmy Hill	14	18	22	22	23	23	16	27	20	21	17	28	19	23	17	28	17	31	19	26	15	20	27	368	10	–
21	Hailie Deegan	17	33	36	34	19	18	29	17	17	27	15	32	15	28	10	33	13	26	22	14	6	17	31	349	7	–
22	Lawless Alan **(R)**	25	19	33	11	20	30	20	19	30	22	18	25	18	24	24	22	34	24	31	23	33	34	18	294	–	–
23	Dean Thompson **(R)**	36	11	34	29	36	16	15	22	29	28	14	24	23	14	27	24	29	35	23	32	34	23	21	279	7	–
24	Jack Wood **(R)**	33	32	13	32	35	22	18	26	16	23	19	16	21	35	29	35	25	23	26	21	19	31	29	279	7	–
25	Austin Wayne Self	13	9	10	27	31	36	27	23	18	25	26				14		19	27		20	30		24	261	11	–
26	Kaz Grala		30		14		26						14	26		7	23	20	22	18		18	18		221	13	–
27	Jesse Little	6		15		27		14	24	19	32	20			19		26	15		28	25				213	2	–
28	Spencer Boyd	11	27	20	23	33	24	24	31	28	24	31	23	29	25	16	32	36	32	33	36	DNQ	36	33	207	–	–
29	Blaine Perkins **(R)**	31	35	29	35	DNQ	25	31	32	26	30	22	21	25	18	30	29	26	34	30	28	27	22	25	203	–	–
30	Kris Wright	19	17	21	15	30	33	33	25	35	19	33	26	28	17	25	27	31							195	–	–
31	Tate Fogleman	22	12	31	18	22	28	32	20	22	29	21			DNQ		20			DNQ					167	–	–
32	Kaden Honeycutt					34									21		25		21	24	13	11	27	9	150	2	–
33	Bret Holmes	35	8			24				15					DNQ				15	17		3	33		148	2	–
34	Taylor Gray				26	26						36				15		22	6		16			17	147	15	–
35	Johnny Sauter	34				2						5						12				25		28	116	–	–
36	Todd Bodine		21					10		13			20		27		36								98	3	–
37	Tyler Hill				DNQ				21	25		25					30		DNQ	29			29	23	77	–	–
38	Layne Riggs																	7	19					13	76	4	–
39	Jordan Anderson	DNQ	26	18						14		16										36			75	–	–
40	Max Gutiérrez										26				8		21						21		72	–	–
41	Jake Garcia					DNQ						29						28	20		22			16	70	–	–
42	Chris Hacker			17						31					29			24			33			26	62	–	–
43	Rajah Caruth											11							25		34			32	46	–	–
44	Danny Bohn	8						22																	44	–	–
45	Buddy Kofoid						27							11											40	4	–
46	Thad Moffitt	18	29	32										31											38	–	–
47	Matt Jaskol	DNQ	22	19	33																				37	–	–
48	Brad Perez				20								22												32	–	–
49	Josh Reaume							28	30		31						34	33	QL	RL	35				31	-	-
50	Stefan Parsons												36^{±}		22								26		26	–	–
51	Clay Greenfield	DNQ													DNQ							12	DNQ		25	–	–
52	Mason Maggio											27							33	32			32		24	–	–
53	Brennan Poole		QL	28^{†}				30^{†}		23^{†}	35	34							DNQ	34			24		21	–	–
54	Nick Leitz														26				36				28		21	–	–
55	Chad Chastain																	30	30				30		21	–	–
56	Mike Marlar						17																		20	–	–
57	Dylan Westbrook													17											20	–	–
58	Jason White	20																				DNQ			17	–	–
59	Loris Hezemans		20																						17	–	–
60	Bryan Dauzat	23															DNQ					35			16	–	–
61	Stephen Mallozzi															22									15	–	–
62	Chase Janes					25									36										13	–	–
63	Blake Lothian					28						DNQ						35							11	–	–
64	Brayton Laster													27											10	–	–
65	Armani Williams									DNQ							31			35				35	10	–	–
66	Keith McGee						34				33													34	10	–	–
67	Logan Bearden				28																				9	–	–
68	Ryan Huff								28																9	–	–
69	Connor Mosack															34					31				9	–	–
70	Trey Hutchens								29						DNQ				DNQ	DNQ					8	–	–
71	Leland Honeyman																				29				8	–	–
72	Justin Marks															31									8	2	–
73	Devon Rouse													30											7	–	–
74	Dillon Steuer					32																			5	–	–
75	Andrew Gordon						32																		5	–	–
76	Dylan Lupton															32									5	–	–
77	Jennifer Jo Cobb	DNQ													DNQ							32			5	–	–
78	Bryson Mitchell													33											4	–	–
79	Kenko Miura															33									4	–	–
80	Jessica Friesen						DNQ							34											3	–	–
81	Camden Murphy														34										3	–	–
82	Trey Burke															35									2	–	–
83	Akinori Ogata							36																	1	–	–
84	Tyler Carpenter													36											1	–	–
85	Mason Filippi															36									1	–	–
	Justin Carroll					DNQ						DNQ			DNQ				DNQ		DNQ				0	–	–
	Norm Benning						DNQ							DNQ			DNQ		DNQ						0	–	–
	John Atwell				DNQ																				0	–	–
	Samuel LeComte				DNQ																				0	–	–
	Braden Mitchell													DNQ											0	–	–
	Tim Viens																					DNQ			0	–	–
	Jason Kitzmiller	Wth																							0	–	–
Ineligible for Camping World Truck championship points
Pos.	Driver	DAY	LVS	ATL	COA	MAR	BRD	DAR	KAN	TEX	CLT	GTW	SON	KNX	NSH	MOH	POC	IRP	RCH	KAN	BRI	TAL	HOM	PHO	Pts.	Stage	Bonus
	Kyle Busch		2		3*	3					7		1*														
	Ross Chastain			23				26		12	1		4														
	William Byron					1*																					
	Todd Gilliland													1^{2}													
	Austin Hill	15															6										
	Joey Logano						**6**																				
	Chase Elliott						7																				
	Riley Herbst	12							12																		
	Harrison Burton						20						12														
	Austin Dillon						14						17														
	Bayley Currey																			27	15	21					
	Matt Mills		15	35					34		34	DNQ															
	Parker Retzlaff																					16					
	Will Rodgers				21																						
	Joey Gase													24					29								
	Alex Bowman				25								29														
	Josh Bilicki												30														
	Brett Moffitt													32						36							
	Jade Buford												33														
	Jesse Iwuji								35																		
	Sheldon Creed				**36**																						
	Garrett Smithley									DNQ																	
	Natalie Decker																					DNQ					
	Bubba Wallace								QL																		
	Daniel Suárez												RL^{‡}														
Pos.	Driver	DAY	LVS	ATL	COA	MAR	BRD	DAR	KAN	TEX	CLT	GTW	SON	KNX	NSH	MOH	POC	IRP	RCH	KAN	BRI	TAL	HOM	PHO	Pts.	Stage	Bonus
^{†} – Brennan Poole started receiving points at Charlotte. He had previously been running for Xfinity Series points.^{‡} – Due to the ankle injury from a crash in the previous week's race at Gateway, Carson Hocevar did not complete the race at Sonoma and was replaced by Daniel Suárez on lap 12. Since Hocevar started the race, he is officially credited with 6th place.^{±} – Stefan Parsons started receiving points at Nashville.

=== Owners' championship (Top 15) ===
(key) Bold – Pole position awarded by time. Italics – Pole position set by competition-based formula. * – Most laps led. ^{1} – Stage 1 winner. ^{2} – Stage 2 winner. ^{1-10} – Regular season top 10 finishers.
. – Eliminated after Round of 10 . – Eliminated after Round of 8

Pos.	No.	Car Owner	DAY	LVS	ATL	COA	MAR	BRD	DAR	KAN	TEX	CLT	GTW	SON	KNX	NSH	MOH	POC	IRP	RCH	KAN	BRI	TAL	HOM	PHO	Points	Bonus
1	38	Bob Jenkins	1	36	5	1^{12}	9^{1}	10	8	1*^{2}	32	5^{1}	9	2	3	2*^{1}	2^{2}	13	3	9	4	2	17	2^{2}	**1***^{12}	4040	37^{1}
2	99	Duke Thorson	2	31^{12}	2	4	5^{2}	1*^{12}	25	10	27	10^{2}	8*^{2}	18^{2}	10	12	23	19	2	18	13	18	2	6^{1}	2	4035	17^{7}
3	18	Kyle Busch	21	1*	4	5	6	19	21	4	8	8	3^{1}	5	13	15	6	1*^{1}	18	1*^{2}	6	9*^{12}	14^{2}	10	3	4034	28^{2}
4	66	Duke Thorson	**7**	10	3	30	11	21	4	2	5	**13**	32	3^{1}	4	4	12	7	8*^{2}	**3**^{1}	8	1	23	1*	20	4017	8^{6}
NASCAR Camping World Truck Series Playoffs cut-off
5	4	Kyle Busch	24*^{12}	**25**	24^{2}	2	4	3	**1***	**6**	**6**	3	35	8	2	9	28	3	**10**^{1}	2	**1***^{12}	12	**24**^{1}	35	4	2285	24^{3}
6	52	Chris Larsen	16	3	6*^{1}	9	13	11	12	14	1*	9	4	31	5	5	4	14	4	11	20	7	20	3	5	2276	13^{4}
7	51	Kyle Busch	32	2	1	3*	3	27	23	33^{1}	7	7	**1**	1*	11	33	**26**	4	5	5	7	10	26	5	7	2262	13^{9}
8	17	David Gilliland	12	4	7	26	26	20	7	12	3^{12}	11	36	12	1^{2}	**1**^{2}	15	2	22	6	3	16	4	4	17	2232	9^{10}
9	98	Mike Curb	3	28	16	6	12	5	17	5	2	4	2	35	12	6	5	8^{2}	16	8	10	8	5*	7	30	2230	7^{5}
10	42	Al Niece	9	13	27	8	17	2	2^{2}	15	4	16*	24	**6**	35*^{1}	3	3	5	21	10	2	19	28	12	10	2186	5^{8}
11	23	Maurice J. Gallagher Jr.	29	23	12	10	8	8	3	3	11	2	28	11	8	32	11	17	1	4	5	4	29	14	6	706	5
12	88	Rhonda Thorson	27	7	25	13	7	9	5	9	9	18	13	34	7	10	18	15	9	7	15	5	22	8	12	637	–
13	19	Bill McAnally	26	24	9	12	14	29	19	8	36	12	7	27	**6**	11	8	9	14	12	21	**6**	13	15	11	595	–
14	16	Shigeaki Hattori	28	16	11	7	10	31	9	16	33	20	13	9	9	7	31	16	6	13	14	11	10	11	14	583	–
15	25	Curtis Sutton	10	6	30	31	15	35	11	7	10	17	6	10	14	31	19	12	11	17	12	27	1	19	22	521	–
Pos.	No.	Car Owner	DAY	LVS	ATL	COA	MAR	BRD	DAR	KAN	TEX	CLT	GTW	SON	KNX	NSH	MOH	POC	IRP	RCH	KAN	BRI	TAL	HOM	PHO	Points	Bonus

=== Manufacturers' championship ===
Pos	Manufacturer	Wins	Points
1	Toyota	12	860
2	Ford	6	795
3	Chevrolet	5	775

== See also ==
- 2022 NASCAR Cup Series
- 2022 NASCAR Xfinity Series
- 2022 ARCA Menards Series
- 2022 ARCA Menards Series East
- 2022 ARCA Menards Series West
- 2022 NASCAR Whelen Modified Tour
- 2022 NASCAR Pinty's Series
- 2022 NASCAR Mexico Series
- 2022 NASCAR Whelen Euro Series
- 2022 SRX Series
- 2022 CARS Tour
- 2022 SMART Modified Tour
