= 2022 Lucas Oil 150 =

23rd race of the 2022 NASCAR Camping World Truck Series

Race details
- Race 23 of 23 of the 2022 NASCAR Camping World Truck Series
- Date: November 4, 2022
- Location: Phoenix Raceway, Avondale, Arizona
- Course: Permanent racing facility
- Course length: 1 miles (1.6 km)
- Distance: 154 laps, 154 mi (247.838 km)
- Scheduled distance: 150 laps, 150 mi (241.402 km)
- Average speed: 89.003 mph (143.236 km/h)

Pole position
| Driver | Zane Smith | Front Row Motorsports |
- Time: 26.081

Most laps led
| Driver | Zane Smith | Front Row Motorsports |
- Laps: 77

Winner
| No. 38 | Zane Smith | Front Row Motorsports |

Television in the United States
- Network: Fox Sports 1
- Announcers: Vince Welch, Phil Parsons, and Michael Waltrip

Radio in the United States
- Radio: Motor Racing Network

The 2022 Lucas Oil 150 was the 23rd and final stock car race of the 2022 NASCAR Camping World Truck Series season, the Championship 4 race, and the 24th iteration of the event. The race was held on Friday, November 4, 2022, in Avondale, Arizona at Phoenix Raceway, a 1 mile (1.6 km) permanent tri-oval shaped racetrack. The race was increased from 150 laps to 154 laps, due to a NASCAR overtime finish. Zane Smith, driving for Front Row Motorsports, would put on a dominating performance, leading 77 laps to earn his seventh career NASCAR Camping World Truck Series win, and his fourth of the season.

By winning the race, Smith would also claim the 2022 NASCAR Camping World Truck Series championship, finishing just in front of Ben Rhodes and Chandler Smith in a 1-2-3 finish. This was Zane's first championship in the Truck Series, after finishing runner-up in the standings from 2020 to 2021. This was also the first championship for Front Row Motorsports as an organization.

== Background ==
Phoenix Raceway is a 1-mile, low-banked tri-oval race track located in Avondale, Arizona, near Phoenix. The motorsport track opened in 1964 and currently hosts two NASCAR race weekends annually including the final championship race since 2020. Phoenix Raceway has also hosted the CART, IndyCar Series, USAC and the IMSA SportsCar Championship. The raceway is currently owned and operated by NASCAR.

Phoenix Raceway is home to two annual NASCAR race weekends. NASCAR announced that its championship weekend events would be run at Phoenix for 2020, marking the first time since NASCAR inaugurated the weekend that Homestead–Miami Speedway would not be the host track. The track will also hold the championship for the 2021 NASCAR Cup season.

=== Championship drivers ===
- Ty Majeski advanced by winning at Bristol and Homestead-Miami.
- Zane Smith advanced by virtue of points.
- Ben Rhodes advanced by virtue of points.
- Chandler Smith advanced by virtue of points.

=== Entry list ===
- (R) denotes rookie driver.
- (CC) denotes chase contender.

| # | Driver | Team | Make |
|---|---|---|---|
| 1 | Hailie Deegan | David Gilliland Racing | Ford |
| 02 | Johnny Sauter | Young's Motorsports | Chevrolet |
| 4 | John Hunter Nemechek | Kyle Busch Motorsports | Toyota |
| 5 | Tyler Hill | Hill Motorsports | Toyota |
| 7 | Rajah Caruth | Spire Motorsports | Chevrolet |
| 9 | Blaine Perkins (R) | CR7 Motorsports | Chevrolet |
| 12 | Spencer Boyd | Young's Motorsports | Chevrolet |
| 15 | Tanner Gray | David Gilliland Racing | Ford |
| 16 | Tyler Ankrum | Hattori Racing Enterprises | Toyota |
| 17 | Taylor Gray | David Gilliland Racing | Ford |
| 18 | Chandler Smith (CC) | Kyle Busch Motorsports | Toyota |
| 19 | Derek Kraus | McAnally–Hilgemann Racing | Chevrolet |
| 20 | Armani Williams | Young's Motorsports | Chevrolet |
| 22 | Austin Wayne Self | AM Racing | Chevrolet |
| 23 | Grant Enfinger | GMS Racing | Chevrolet |
| 24 | Jack Wood (R) | GMS Racing | Chevrolet |
| 25 | Matt DiBenedetto | Rackley W.A.R. | Chevrolet |
| 30 | Kaden Honeycutt | On Point Motorsports | Toyota |
| 33 | Keith McGee | Reaume Brothers Racing | Chevrolet |
| 35 | Jake Garcia | McAnally–Hilgemann Racing | Chevrolet |
| 38 | Zane Smith (CC) | Front Row Motorsports | Ford |
| 40 | Dean Thompson (R) | Niece Motorsports | Chevrolet |
| 42 | Carson Hocevar | Niece Motorsports | Chevrolet |
| 43 | Chris Hacker | Reaume Brothers Racing | Toyota |
| 45 | Lawless Alan (R) | Niece Motorsports | Chevrolet |
| 51 | Corey Heim (R) | Kyle Busch Motorsports | Toyota |
| 52 | Stewart Friesen | Halmar Friesen Racing | Toyota |
| 56 | Timmy Hill | Hill Motorsports | Toyota |
| 61 | Chase Purdy | Hattori Racing Enterprises | Toyota |
| 62 | Layne Riggs | Halmar Friesen Racing | Toyota |
| 66 | Ty Majeski (CC) | ThorSport Racing | Toyota |
| 88 | Matt Crafton | ThorSport Racing | Toyota |
| 91 | Colby Howard | McAnally–Hilgemann Racing | Chevrolet |
| 98 | Christian Eckes | ThorSport Racing | Toyota |
| 99 | Ben Rhodes (CC) | ThorSport Racing | Toyota |
Official entry list

== Practice ==
The only 50-minute practice session was held on Thursday, November 3, at 5:05 PM MST. Ty Majeski, driving for ThorSport Racing, would set the fastest time in the session, with a lap of 25.921, and an average speed of 138.884 mph (223.512 km/h).

| Pos. | # | Driver | Team | Make | Time | Speed |
|---|---|---|---|---|---|---|
| 1 | 66 | Ty Majeski | ThorSport Racing | Toyota | 25.921 | 138.884 |
| 2 | 38 | Zane Smith | Front Row Motorsports | Ford | 26.330 | 136.726 |
| 3 | 18 | Chandler Smith | Kyle Busch Motorsports | Toyota | 26.425 | 136.235 |
Full practice results

== Qualifying ==
Qualifying was held on Friday, November 4, at 3:00 PM MST. Since Phoenix Raceway is a tri-oval track, the qualifying system used is a single-car, one-lap system with only one round. Whoever sets the fastest time in the round wins the pole. Zane Smith, driving for Front Row Motorsports, would score the pole for the race, with a lap of 26.081, and an average speed of 138.032 mph (222.141 km/h).

| Pos. | # | Driver | Team | Make | Time | Speed |
|---|---|---|---|---|---|---|
| 1 | 38 | Zane Smith | Front Row Motorsports | Ford | 26.081 | 138.032 |
| 2 | 62 | Layne Riggs | Halmar Friesen Racing | Toyota | 26.120 | 137.825 |
| 3 | 51 | Corey Heim (R) | Kyle Busch Motorsports | Toyota | 26.206 | 137.373 |
| 4 | 15 | Tanner Gray | David Gilliland Racing | Ford | 26.280 | 136.986 |
| 5 | 52 | Stewart Friesen | Halmar Friesen Racing | Toyota | 26.283 | 136.971 |
| 6 | 99 | Ben Rhodes | ThorSport Racing | Toyota | 26.315 | 136.804 |
| 7 | 98 | Christian Eckes | ThorSport Racing | Toyota | 26.330 | 136.726 |
| 8 | 66 | Ty Majeski | ThorSport Racing | Toyota | 26.362 | 136.560 |
| 9 | 88 | Matt Crafton | ThorSport Racing | Toyota | 26.441 | 136.152 |
| 10 | 4 | John Hunter Nemechek | Kyle Busch Motorsports | Toyota | 26.469 | 136.008 |
| 11 | 25 | Matt DiBenedetto | Rackley W.A.R. | Chevrolet | 26.516 | 135.767 |
| 12 | 18 | Chandler Smith | Kyle Busch Motorsports | Toyota | 26.537 | 135.660 |
| 13 | 23 | Grant Enfinger | GMS Racing | Chevrolet | 26.539 | 135.649 |
| 14 | 1 | Hailie Deegan | David Gilliland Racing | Ford | 26.564 | 135.522 |
| 15 | 30 | Kaden Honeycutt | On Point Motorsports | Toyota | 26.569 | 135.496 |
| 16 | 24 | Jack Wood (R) | GMS Racing | Chevrolet | 26.641 | 135.130 |
| 17 | 35 | Jake Garcia | McAnally–Hilgemann Racing | Chevrolet | 26.641 | 135.130 |
| 18 | 7 | Rajah Caruth | Spire Motorsports | Chevrolet | 26.663 | 135.019 |
| 19 | 61 | Chase Purdy | Hattori Racing Enterprises | Toyota | 26.681 | 134.927 |
| 20 | 91 | Colby Howard | McAnally–Hilgemann Racing | Chevrolet | 26.774 | 134.459 |
| 21 | 17 | Taylor Gray | David Gilliland Racing | Ford | 26.802 | 134.318 |
| 22 | 42 | Carson Hocevar | Niece Motorsports | Chevrolet | 26.828 | 134.188 |
| 23 | 19 | Derek Kraus | McAnally–Hilgemann Racing | Chevrolet | 26.830 | 134.178 |
| 24 | 16 | Tyler Ankrum | Hattori Racing Enterprises | Toyota | 26.851 | 134.073 |
| 25 | 9 | Blaine Perkins (R) | CR7 Motorsports | Chevrolet | 26.890 | 133.879 |
| 26 | 40 | Dean Thompson (R) | Niece Motorsports | Chevrolet | 26.942 | 133.620 |
| 27 | 02 | Johnny Sauter | Young's Motorsports | Chevrolet | 27.047 | 133.102 |
| 28 | 43 | Chris Hacker | Reaume Brothers Racing | Toyota | 27.101 | 132.836 |
| 29 | 56 | Timmy Hill | Hill Motorsports | Toyota | 27.173 | 132.484 |
| 30 | 22 | Austin Wayne Self | AM Racing | Chevrolet | 27.374 | 131.512 |
| 31 | 5 | Tyler Hill | Hill Motorsports | Toyota | 27.568 | 130.586 |
Qualified by owner's points
| 32 | 45 | Lawless Alan (R) | Niece Motorsports | Chevrolet | 27.641 | 130.241 |
| 33 | 12 | Spencer Boyd | Young's Motorsports | Chevrolet | 27.752 | 129.720 |
| 34 | 33 | Keith McGee | Reaume Brothers Racing | Chevrolet | 27.987 | 128.631 |
| 35 | 20 | Armani Williams | Young's Motorsports | Chevrolet | 28.194 | 127.687 |
Official qualifying results
Official starting lineup

== Race results ==
Stage 1 Laps: 44

| Pos. | # | Driver | Team | Make | Pts |
|---|---|---|---|---|---|
| 1 | 38 | Zane Smith | Front Row Motorsports | Ford | 0 |
| 2 | 51 | Corey Heim (R) | Kyle Busch Motorsports | Toyota | 9 |
| 3 | 52 | Stewart Friesen | Halmar Friesen Racing | Toyota | 8 |
| 4 | 4 | John Hunter Nemechek | Kyle Busch Motorsports | Toyota | 7 |
| 5 | 88 | Matt Crafton | ThorSport Racing | Toyota | 6 |
| 6 | 99 | Ben Rhodes | ThorSport Racing | Toyota | 0 |
| 7 | 23 | Grant Enfinger | GMS Racing | Chevrolet | 4 |
| 8 | 18 | Chandler Smith | Kyle Busch Motorsports | Toyota | 0 |
| 9 | 98 | Christian Eckes | ThorSport Racing | Toyota | 2 |
| 10 | 62 | Layne Riggs | Halmar Friesen Racing | Toyota | 1 |

Stage 2 Laps: 44

| Pos. | # | Driver | Team | Make | Pts |
|---|---|---|---|---|---|
| 1 | 38 | Zane Smith | Front Row Motorsports | Ford | 0 |
| 2 | 4 | John Hunter Nemechek | Kyle Busch Motorsports | Toyota | 9 |
| 3 | 18 | Chandler Smith | Kyle Busch Motorsports | Toyota | 0 |
| 4 | 51 | Corey Heim (R) | Kyle Busch Motorsports | Toyota | 7 |
| 5 | 66 | Ty Majeski | ThorSport Racing | Toyota | 6 |
| 6 | 88 | Matt Crafton | ThorSport Racing | Toyota | 5 |
| 7 | 23 | Grant Enfinger | GMS Racing | Chevrolet | 5 |
| 8 | 52 | Stewart Friesen | Halmar Friesen Racing | Toyota | 4 |
| 9 | 17 | Taylor Gray | David Gilliland Racing | Ford | 2 |
| 10 | 99 | Ben Rhodes | ThorSport Racing | Toyota | 0 |

Stage 3 Laps: 64*

| Fin. | St | # | Driver | Team | Make | Laps | Led | Status | Pts |
|---|---|---|---|---|---|---|---|---|---|
| 1 | 1 | 38 | Zane Smith | Front Row Motorsports | Ford | 154 | 77 | Running | 40 |
| 2 | 6 | 99 | Ben Rhodes | ThorSport Racing | Toyota | 154 | 8 | Running | 35 |
| 3 | 12 | 18 | Chandler Smith | Kyle Busch Motorsports | Toyota | 154 | 9 | Running | 34 |
| 4 | 10 | 4 | John Hunter Nemechek | Kyle Busch Motorsports | Toyota | 154 | 44 | Running | 49 |
| 5 | 5 | 52 | Stewart Friesen | Halmar Friesen Racing | Toyota | 154 | 6 | Running | 43 |
| 6 | 13 | 23 | Grant Enfinger | GMS Racing | Chevrolet | 154 | 0 | Running | 39 |
| 7 | 3 | 51 | Corey Heim (R) | Kyle Busch Motorsports | Toyota | 154 | 5 | Running | 46 |
| 8 | 4 | 15 | Tanner Gray | David Gilliland Racing | Ford | 154 | 0 | Running | 29 |
| 9 | 15 | 30 | Kaden Honeycutt | On Point Motorsports | Toyota | 154 | 0 | Running | 28 |
| 10 | 22 | 42 | Carson Hocevar | Niece Motorsports | Chevrolet | 154 | 0 | Running | 27 |
| 11 | 23 | 19 | Derek Kraus | McAnally–Hilgemann Racing | Chevrolet | 154 | 0 | Running | 26 |
| 12 | 9 | 88 | Matt Crafton | ThorSport Racing | Toyota | 154 | 0 | Running | 36 |
| 13 | 2 | 62 | Layne Riggs | Halmar Friesen Racing | Toyota | 154 | 5 | Running | 25 |
| 14 | 24 | 16 | Tyler Ankrum | Hattori Racing Enterprises | Toyota | 154 | 0 | Running | 23 |
| 15 | 20 | 91 | Colby Howard | McAnally–Hilgemann Racing | Chevrolet | 154 | 0 | Running | 22 |
| 16 | 17 | 35 | Jake Garcia | McAnally–Hilgemann Racing | Chevrolet | 154 | 0 | Running | 21 |
| 17 | 21 | 17 | Taylor Gray | David Gilliland Racing | Ford | 154 | 0 | Running | 22 |
| 18 | 32 | 45 | Lawless Alan (R) | Niece Motorsports | Chevrolet | 154 | 0 | Running | 19 |
| 19 | 19 | 61 | Chase Purdy | Hattori Racing Enterprises | Toyota | 154 | 0 | Running | 18 |
| 20 | 8 | 66 | Ty Majeski | ThorSport Racing | Toyota | 154 | 0 | Running | 17 |
| 21 | 26 | 40 | Dean Thompson (R) | Niece Motorsports | Chevrolet | 154 | 0 | Running | 16 |
| 22 | 11 | 25 | Matt DiBenedetto | Rackley W.A.R. | Chevrolet | 153 | 0 | Running | 15 |
| 23 | 31 | 5 | Tyler Hill | Hill Motorsports | Toyota | 152 | 0 | Running | 14 |
| 24 | 30 | 22 | Austin Wayne Self | AM Racing | Chevrolet | 152 | 0 | Running | 13 |
| 25 | 25 | 9 | Blaine Perkins (R) | CR7 Motorsports | Chevrolet | 152 | 0 | Running | 12 |
| 26 | 28 | 43 | Chris Hacker | Reaume Brothers Racing | Toyota | 152 | 0 | Running | 11 |
| 27 | 29 | 56 | Timmy Hill | Hill Motorsports | Toyota | 152 | 0 | Running | 10 |
| 28 | 27 | 02 | Johnny Sauter | Young's Motorsports | Chevrolet | 152 | 0 | Running | 9 |
| 29 | 16 | 24 | Jack Wood (R) | GMS Racing | Chevrolet | 151 | 0 | Running | 8 |
| 30 | 7 | 98 | Christian Eckes | ThorSport Racing | Toyota | 151 | 0 | Running | 9 |
| 31 | 14 | 1 | Hailie Deegan | David Gilliland Racing | Ford | 133 | 0 | Accident | 6 |
| 32 | 18 | 7 | Rajah Caruth | Spire Motorsports | Chevrolet | 106 | 0 | Accident | 5 |
| 33 | 33 | 12 | Spencer Boyd | Young's Motorsports | Chevrolet | 63 | 0 | Too Slow | 4 |
| 34 | 34 | 33 | Keith McGee | Reaume Brothers Racing | Chevrolet | 15 | 0 | DVP | 3 |
| 35 | 35 | 20 | Armani Williams | Young's Motorsports | Chevrolet | 6 | 0 | Accident | 2 |
Official race results

== Standings after the race ==
Drivers' Championship standings

| | Pos | Driver | Points |
|---|---|---|---|
| 1 | 1 | Zane Smith | 4,040 |
| 1 | 2 | Ben Rhodes | 4,035 (-5) |
| 1 | 3 | Chandler Smith | 4,034 (-6) |
| 3 | 4 | Ty Majeski | 4,017 (-23) |
| | 5 | John Hunter Nemechek | 2,285 (-1,755) |
| | 6 | Stewart Friesen | 2,276 (-1,764) |
| | 7 | Grant Enfinger | 2,266 (-1,774) |
| | 8 | Christian Eckes | 2,230 (-1,810) |
| | 9 | Matt Crafton | 2,208 (-1,832) |
| | 10 | Carson Hocevar | 2,186 (-1,854) |
Official driver's standings

- Note: Only the first 10 positions are included for the driver standings.

| Previous race: 2022 Baptist Health 200 | NASCAR Camping World Truck Series; 2022 season | Next race: 2023 NextEra Energy 250 |
