= Dylan Westbrook =

Canadian racing driver (born 1998)

- Born: December 10, 1998 (age 27); Scotland, Ontario, Canada
- Achievements: 2016, 2017 Southern Ontario Sprints Champion; 2017 Patriot Sprint Tour Champion
- Awards: 2016 Southern Ontario Sprints Rookie of the Year

NASCAR FedEx Freight Truck Series career
- 1 race run over 1 year
- 2022 position: 57th
- Best finish: 57th (2022)
- First race: 2022 Clean Harbors 150 (Knoxville)
| Wins | Top tens | Poles |
|---|---|---|
| 0 | 0 | 0 |
- Statistics up to date as of November 5, 2022.

Dylan Westbrook (born December 10, 1998) is a Canadian professional dirt track racing driver who competes full-time in the Lucas Oil American Sprint Car Series.

== Motorsports career results ==
=== NASCAR ===
(key) (Bold – Pole position awarded by qualifying time. Italics – Pole position earned by points standings or practice time. * – Most laps led.)

==== Camping World Truck Series ====
NASCAR Camping World Truck Series results
| Year | Team | No. | Make | 1 | 2 | 3 | 4 | 5 | 6 | 7 | 8 | 9 | 10 | 11 | 12 | 13 | 14 | 15 | 16 | 17 | 18 | 19 | 20 | 21 | 22 | 23 | NCWTS | Pts | Ref |
|---|---|---|---|---|---|---|---|---|---|---|---|---|---|---|---|---|---|---|---|---|---|---|---|---|---|---|---|---|---|
| 2022 | Jordan Anderson Racing | 3 | Chevy | DAY | LVS | ATL | COA | MAR | BRI | DAR | KAN | TEX | CLT | GTW | SON | KNX; 17 | NSH | MOH | POC | IRP | RCH | KAN | BRI | TAL | HOM | PHO | 57th | 20 | |

^{*} Season still in progress
