= 2022 CRC Brakleen 150 =

16th race of the 2022 NASCAR Camping World Truck Series

Race details
- Race 16 of 23 of the 2022 NASCAR Camping World Truck Series
- Date: July 23, 2022
- Location: Pocono Raceway, Long Pond, Pennsylvania
- Course: Permanent racing facility
- Course length: 2.5 miles (4.0 km)
- Distance: 60 laps, 150 mi (241.402 km)
- Average speed: 111.593 mph (179.592 km/h)

Pole position
Driver	Zane Smith	Front Row Motorsports
- Grid positions set by competition-based formula

Most laps led
Driver	Chandler Smith	Kyle Busch Motorsports
- Laps: 49

Winner
No. 18	Chandler Smith	Kyle Busch Motorsports

Television in the United States
- Network: Fox
- Announcers: Vince Welch, Trevor Bayne, and Phil Parsons

Radio in the United States
- Radio: Motor Racing Network

The 2022 CRC Brakleen 150 was the 16th stock car race of the 2022 NASCAR Camping World Truck Series, the final race of the regular season, and the 13th iteration of the event. The race was held on Saturday, July 23, 2022, in Long Pond, Pennsylvania at Pocono Raceway, a 2.5 miles (4.0 km) permanent triangular-shaped racetrack. The race took the scheduled 60 laps to complete. Chandler Smith, driving for Kyle Busch Motorsports, held off Ryan Preece in the final few laps, and earned his fourth career NASCAR Camping World Truck Series win, and his second of the season. Smith would also dominate the race, leading 49 laps. To fill out the podium, John Hunter Nemechek, driving for Kyle Busch Motorsports, would finish 3rd, respectively.

The ten drivers to qualify for the NASCAR playoffs are Zane Smith, Chandler Smith, Ben Rhodes, John Hunter Nemechek, Stewart Friesen, Christian Eckes, Ty Majeski, Carson Hocevar, Grant Enfinger, and Matt Crafton. Zane Smith would also win the Regular Season Championship following the race.

This race also marked the 800th and final NASCAR start for Todd Bodine.

== Background ==
Pocono Raceway also known as The Tricky Triangle, is a superspeedway located in the Pocono Mountains in Long Pond, Pennsylvania. It is the site of three NASCAR national series races and an ARCA Menards Series. From 1971 to 1989, and from 2013 to 2019, the track also hosted an IndyCar Series race. Additionally, from 1982 to 2021, it hosted two NASCAR Cup Series races, with the traditional first date being removed for 2022.

Pocono is one of the few NASCAR tracks not owned by either NASCAR or Speedway Motorsports, the dominant track owners in NASCAR. Pocono CEO Nick Igdalsky and president Ben May are members of the family-owned Mattco Inc, started by Joseph II and Rose Mattioli. Mattco also owns South Boston Speedway in South Boston, Virginia.

Outside NASCAR and IndyCar Series races, Pocono is used throughout the year by the Stock Car Experience, Bertil Roos Driving School, Sports Car Club of America (SCCA) as well as many other clubs and organizations. The triangular track also has three separate infield sections of racetrack – the north course, east course and south course. Each of these infield sections use separate portions of the track or can be combined for longer and more technical course configurations. In total Pocono Raceway has offers 22 different road course configurations ranging from .5 miles to 3.65 miles in length. During regular non-race weekends, multiple clubs or driving schools can use the track simultaneously by running on different infield sections. All of the infield sections can also be run in either clockwise or counter clockwise direction which doubles the 22 course configuration to 44 total course options.

=== Entry list ===
- (R) denotes rookie driver.
- (i) denotes driver who are ineligible for series driver points.

#	Driver	Team	Make
1	Hailie Deegan	David Gilliland Racing	Ford
02	Kaz Grala	Young's Motorsports	Chevrolet
4	John Hunter Nemechek	Kyle Busch Motorsports	Toyota
5	Tyler Hill	Hill Motorsports	Toyota
6	Norm Benning	Norm Benning Racing	Chevrolet
7	Austin Hill (i)	Spire Motorsports	Chevrolet
9	Blaine Perkins (R)	CR7 Motorsports	Chevrolet
12	Spencer Boyd	Young's Motorsports	Chevrolet
15	Tanner Gray	David Gilliland Racing	Ford
16	Tyler Ankrum	Hattori Racing Enterprises	Toyota
17	Ryan Preece	David Gilliland Racing	Ford
18	Chandler Smith	Kyle Busch Motorsports	Toyota
19	Derek Kraus	McAnally–Hilgemann Racing	Chevrolet
20	Jesse Little	Young's Motorsports	Chevrolet
22	Max Gutiérrez	AM Racing	Chevrolet
23	Grant Enfinger	GMS Racing	Chevrolet
24	Jack Wood (R)	GMS Racing	Chevrolet
25	Matt DiBenedetto	Rackley W.A.R.	Chevrolet
26	Tate Fogleman	Rackley W.A.R.	Chevrolet
28	Bryan Dauzat	FDNY Racing	Chevrolet
30	Kaden Honeycutt	On Point Motorsports	Toyota
33	Josh Reaume	Reaume Brothers Racing	Toyota
38	Zane Smith	Front Row Motorsports	Ford
40	Dean Thompson (R)	Niece Motorsports	Chevrolet
42	Carson Hocevar	Niece Motorsports	Chevrolet
43	Armani Williams	Reaume Brothers Racing	Chevrolet
44	Kris Wright	Niece Motorsports	Chevrolet
45	Lawless Alan (R)	Niece Motorsports	Chevrolet
51	Corey Heim (R)	Kyle Busch Motorsports	Toyota
52	Stewart Friesen	Halmar Friesen Racing	Toyota
56	Timmy Hill	Hill Motorsports	Toyota
61	Chase Purdy	Hattori Racing Enterprises	Toyota
62	Todd Bodine	Halmar Friesen Racing	Toyota
66	Ty Majeski	ThorSport Racing	Toyota
88	Matt Crafton	ThorSport Racing	Toyota
91	Colby Howard	McAnally–Hilgemann Racing	Chevrolet
98	Christian Eckes	ThorSport Racing	Toyota
99	Ben Rhodes	ThorSport Racing	Toyota
Official entry list

== Starting lineup ==
Practice and qualifying were scheduled to be held on Friday, July 22, at 4:00 PM EST, and 4:30 PM EST, but were both cancelled due to inclement weather. The starting lineup would be determined by a performance-based metric system. As a result, Zane Smith, driving for Front Row Motorsports, would earn the pole. Bryan Dauzat and Norm Benning would fail to qualify.

Pos.	#	Driver	Team	Make
1	38	Zane Smith	Front Row Motorsports	Ford
2	18	Chandler Smith	Kyle Busch Motorsports	Toyota
3	42	Carson Hocevar	Niece Motorsports	Chevrolet
4	52	Stewart Friesen	Halmar Friesen Racing	Toyota
5	98	Christian Eckes	ThorSport Racing	Toyota
6	66	Ty Majeski	ThorSport Racing	Toyota
7	19	Derek Kraus	McAnally–Hilgemann Racing	Chevrolet
8	23	Grant Enfinger	GMS Racing	Chevrolet
9	02	Kaz Grala	Young's Motorsports	Chevrolet
10	91	Colby Howard	McAnally–Hilgemann Racing	Chevrolet
11	99	Ben Rhodes	ThorSport Racing	Toyota
12	4	John Hunter Nemechek	Kyle Busch Motorsports	Toyota
13	88	Matt Crafton	ThorSport Racing	Toyota
14	16	Tyler Ankrum	Hattori Racing Enterprises	Toyota
15	61	Chase Purdy	Hattori Racing Enterprises	Toyota
16	25	Matt DiBenedetto	Rackley W.A.R.	Chevrolet
17	51	Corey Heim (R)	Kyle Busch Motorsports	Toyota
18	15	Tanner Gray	David Gilliland Racing	Ford
19	1	Hailie Deegan	David Gilliland Racing	Ford
20	56	Timmy Hill	Hill Motorsports	Chevrolet
21	12	Spencer Boyd	Young's Motorsports	Chevrolet
22	17	Ryan Preece	David Gilliland Racing	Ford
23	45	Lawless Alan (R)	Niece Motorsports	Chevrolet
24	44	Kris Wright	Niece Motorsports	Chevrolet
25	24	Jack Wood (R)	GMS Racing	Chevrolet
26	40	Dean Thompson (R)	Niece Motorsports	Chevrolet
27	22	Max Gutiérrez	AM Racing	Chevrolet
28	9	Blaine Perkins (R)	CR7 Motorsports	Chevrolet
29	43	Armani Williams	Reaume Brothers Racing	Chevrolet
30	33	Josh Reaume	Reaume Brothers Racing	Toyota
31	7	Austin Hill (i)	Spire Motorsports	Chevrolet
Qualified by owner's points
32	20	Jesse Little	Young's Motorsports	Chevrolet
33	30	Kaden Honeycutt	On Point Motorsports	Toyota
34	62	Todd Bodine	Halmar Friesen Racing	Toyota
35	5	Tyler Hill	Hill Motorsports	Toyota
36	26	Tate Fogleman	Rackley W.A.R.	Chevrolet
Failed to qualify
37	28	Bryan Dauzat	FDNY Racing	Chevrolet
38	6	Norm Benning	Norm Benning Racing	Chevrolet
Official starting lineup

== Race results ==
Stage 1 Laps: 15

Pos.	#	Driver	Team	Make	Pts
1	18	Chandler Smith	Kyle Busch Motorsports	Toyota	10
2	98	Christian Eckes	ThorSport Racing	Toyota	9
3	42	Carson Hocevar	Niece Motorsports	Chevrolet	8
4	52	Stewart Friesen	Halmar Friesen Racing	Toyota	7
5	19	Derek Kraus	McAnally–Hilgemann Racing	Chevrolet	6
6	38	Zane Smith	Front Row Motorsports	Ford	5
7	4	John Hunter Nemechek	Kyle Busch Motorsports	Toyota	4
8	16	Tyler Ankrum	Hattori Racing Enterprises	Toyota	3
9	88	Matt Crafton	ThorSport Racing	Toyota	2
10	51	Corey Heim (R)	Kyle Busch Motorsports	Toyota	1

Stage 2 Laps: 15

Pos.	#	Driver	Team	Make	Pts
1	98	Christian Eckes	ThorSport Racing	Toyota	10
2	16	Tyler Ankrum	Hattori Racing Enterprises	Toyota	9
3	88	Matt Crafton	ThorSport Racing	Toyota	8
4	4	John Hunter Nemechek	Kyle Busch Motorsports	Toyota	7
5	66	Ty Majeski	ThorSport Racing	Toyota	6
6	91	Colby Howard	McAnally–Hilgemann Racing	Chevrolet	5
7	61	Chase Purdy	Hattori Racing Enterprises	Toyota	4
8	38	Zane Smith	Front Row Motorsports	Ford	3
9	20	Jesse Little	Young's Motorsports	Chevrolet	2
10	23	Grant Enfinger	GMS Racing	Chevrolet	1

Stage 3 Laps: 30

Fin.	St	#	Driver	Team	Make	Laps	Led	Status	Pts
1	2	18	Chandler Smith	Kyle Busch Motorsports	Toyota	60	49	Running	50
2	22	17	Ryan Preece	David Gilliland Racing	Ford	60	6	Running	35
3	12	4	John Hunter Nemechek	Kyle Busch Motorsports	Toyota	60	0	Running	45
4	17	51	Corey Heim (R)	Kyle Busch Motorsports	Toyota	60	0	Running	34
5	3	42	Carson Hocevar	Niece Motorsports	Chevrolet	60	0	Running	40
6	31	7	Austin Hill (i)	Spire Motorsports	Chevrolet	60	0	Running	0
7	6	66	Ty Majeski	ThorSport Racing	Toyota	60	0	Running	36
8	5	98	Christian Eckes	ThorSport Racing	Toyota	60	5	Running	48
9	7	19	Derek Kraus	McAnally–Hilgemann Racing	Chevrolet	60	0	Running	34
10	18	15	Tanner Gray	David Gilliland Racing	Ford	60	0	Running	27
11	15	61	Chase Purdy	Hattori Racing Enterprises	Toyota	60	0	Running	30
12	16	25	Matt DiBenedetto	Rackley W.A.R.	Chevrolet	60	0	Running	25
13	1	38	Zane Smith	Front Row Motorsports	Ford	60	0	Running	32
14	4	52	Stewart Friesen	Halmar Friesen Racing	Toyota	60	0	Running	30
15	13	88	Matt Crafton	ThorSport Racing	Toyota	60	0	Running	32
16	14	16	Tyler Ankrum	Hattori Racing Enterprises	Toyota	60	0	Running	33
17	8	23	Grant Enfinger	GMS Racing	Chevrolet	60	0	Running	21
18	10	91	Colby Howard	McAnally–Hilgemann Racing	Chevrolet	60	0	Running	24
19	11	99	Ben Rhodes	ThorSport Racing	Toyota	60	0	Running	18
20	36	26	Tate Fogleman	Rackley W.A.R.	Chevrolet	60	0	Running	17
21	27	22	Max Gutiérrez	AM Racing	Chevrolet	60	0	Running	16
22	23	45	Lawless Alan (R)	Niece Motorsports	Chevrolet	60	0	Running	15
23	9	02	Kaz Grala	Young's Motorsports	Chevrolet	60	0	Running	14
24	26	40	Dean Thompson (R)	Niece Motorsports	Chevrolet	60	0	Running	13
25	33	30	Kaden Honeycutt	On Point Motorsports	Toyota	60	0	Running	12
26	32	20	Jesse Little	Young's Motorsports	Chevrolet	60	0	Running	13
27	24	44	Kris Wright	Niece Motorsports	Chevrolet	60	0	Running	10
28	20	56	Timmy Hill	Hill Motorsports	Toyota	60	0	Running	9
29	28	9	Blaine Perkins (R)	CR7 Motorsports	Chevrolet	60	0	Running	8
30	35	5	Tyler Hill	Hill Motorsports	Toyota	60	0	Running	7
31	29	43	Armani Williams	Reaume Brothers Racing	Chevrolet	59	0	Running	6
32	21	12	Spencer Boyd	Young's Motorsports	Chevrolet	59	0	Running	5
33	19	1	Hailie Deegan	David Gilliland Racing	Ford	57	0	Brakes	4
34	30	33	Josh Reaume	Reaume Brothers Racing	Toyota	55	0	Running	3
35	25	24	Jack Wood (R)	GMS Racing	Chevrolet	18	0	Accident	2
36	34	62	Todd Bodine	Halmar Friesen Racing	Toyota	12	0	Accident	1
Official race results

== Standings after the race ==
Drivers' Championship standings

	Pos	Driver	Points
	1	Zane Smith	2,037
1	2	Chandler Smith	2,022 (-15)
2	3	Ben Rhodes	2,017 (-20)
2	4	John Hunter Nemechek	2,016 (-21)
1	5	Stewart Friesen	2,013 (-24)
1	6	Christian Eckes	2,007 (-30)
1	7	Ty Majeski	2,006 (-31)
	8	Carson Hocevar	2,005 (-32)
	9	Grant Enfinger	2,002 (-35)
	10	Matt Crafton	2,001 (-36)
Official driver's standings

- Note: Only the first 10 positions are included for the driver standings.

Previous race: 2022 O'Reilly Auto Parts 150 at Mid-Ohio	NASCAR Camping World Truck Series; 2022 season	Next race: 2022 TSport 200
