= 2022 UNOH 200 =

20th race of the 2022 NASCAR Camping World Truck Series

2022 UNOH 200 presented by Ohio Logistics
Race details
- Race 20 of 23 of the 2022 NASCAR Camping World Truck Series
- Date: September 15, 2022
- Official name: 25th Annual UNOH 200 presented by Ohio Logistics
- Location: Bristol Motor Speedway, Bristol, Tennessee
- Course: Permanent racing facility
- Course length: 0.533 miles (0.858 km)
- Distance: 200 laps, 106.6 mi (171.556 km)
- Average speed: 74.705 mph (120.226 km/h)

Pole position
Driver	Derek Kraus	McAnally–Hilgemann Racing
- Time: 15.276

Most laps led
Driver	Chandler Smith	Kyle Busch Motorsports
- Laps: 89

Winner
No. 66	Ty Majeski	ThorSport Racing

Television in the United States
- Network: Fox Sports 1
- Announcers: Vince Welch, Phil Parsons, and Michael Waltrip

Radio in the United States
- Radio: Motor Racing Network

The 2022 UNOH 200 presented by Ohio Logistics was the 20th stock car race of the 2022 NASCAR Camping World Truck Series, the first race of the Round of 8, and the 25th iteration of the event. The race was held on Thursday, September 15, 2022, in Bristol, Tennessee at Bristol Motor Speedway, a 0.533 miles (0.858 km) permanent oval-shaped racetrack. The race took the scheduled 200 laps to complete. Ty Majeski, driving for ThorSport Racing, dominated during the end of the final stages, and earned his first career NASCAR Camping World Truck Series win. He would also earn a spot in the championship 4. Chandler Smith dominated a majority of the race, leading 89 laps. To fill out the podium, Zane Smith, driving for Front Row Motorsports, and Parker Kligerman, driving for Henderson Motorsports, would finish 2nd and 3rd, respectively.

This was the debut race for the full-time ARCA Menards Series East driver, Leland Honeyman.

== Background ==
Bristol Motor Speedway, formerly known as Bristol International Raceway and Bristol Raceway, is a NASCAR short track venue located in Bristol, Tennessee. Constructed in 1960, it held its first NASCAR race on July 30, 1961. Bristol is among the most popular tracks on the NASCAR schedule because of its distinct features, which include extraordinarily steep banking, an all-concrete surface, two pit roads, and stadium-like seating. It has also been named one of the loudest NASCAR tracks. The track is billed as the "World's Fastest Half-Mile", even though that designation technically belongs to the Volusia Speedway Park dirt track.

=== Entry list ===
- (R) - denotes rookie driver
- (i) - denotes driver who is ineligible for series driver points.

#	Driver	Team	Make
1	Hailie Deegan	David Gilliland Racing	Ford
02	Jesse Little	Young's Motorsports	Chevrolet
4	John Hunter Nemechek	Kyle Busch Motorsports	Toyota
7	Rajah Caruth	Spire Motorsports	Chevrolet
9	Blaine Perkins (R)	CR7 Motorsports	Chevrolet
12	Spencer Boyd	Young's Motorsports	Chevrolet
15	Tanner Gray	David Gilliland Racing	Ford
16	Tyler Ankrum	Hattori Racing Enterprises	Toyota
17	Taylor Gray	David Gilliland Racing	Ford
18	Chandler Smith	Kyle Busch Motorsports	Toyota
19	Derek Kraus	McAnally–Hilgemann Racing	Chevrolet
20	Leland Honeyman	Young's Motorsports	Chevrolet
22	Austin Wayne Self	AM Racing	Chevrolet
23	Grant Enfinger	GMS Racing	Chevrolet
24	Jack Wood (R)	GMS Racing	Chevrolet
25	Matt DiBenedetto	Rackley W.A.R.	Chevrolet
30	Kaden Honeycutt	On Point Motorsports	Toyota
32	Connor Mosack	Bret Holmes Racing	Chevrolet
33	Chris Hacker	Reaume Brothers Racing	Toyota
35	Jake Garcia	McAnally–Hilgemann Racing	Chevrolet
38	Zane Smith	Front Row Motorsports	Ford
40	Dean Thompson (R)	Niece Motorsports	Chevrolet
42	Carson Hocevar	Niece Motorsports	Chevrolet
43	Josh Reaume	Reaume Brothers Racing	Chevrolet
44	Bayley Currey (i)	Niece Motorsports	Chevrolet
45	Lawless Alan (R)	Niece Motorsports	Chevrolet
51	Corey Heim (R)	Kyle Busch Motorsports	Toyota
52	Stewart Friesen	Halmar Friesen Racing	Toyota
56	Timmy Hill	Hill Motorsports	Toyota
61	Chase Purdy	Hattori Racing Enterprises	Toyota
66	Ty Majeski	ThorSport Racing	Toyota
75	Parker Kligerman	Henderson Motorsports	Toyota
88	Matt Crafton	ThorSport Racing	Toyota
90	Justin Carroll	TC Motorsports	Toyota
91	Colby Howard	McAnally–Hilgemann Racing	Chevrolet
98	Christian Eckes	ThorSport Racing	Toyota
99	Ben Rhodes	ThorSport Racing	Toyota
Official entry list

== Practice ==
For practice, drivers will be separated into two groups, Group A and B. Both sessions will be 15 minutes long, and was held on Thursday, September 15, at 4:30 PM EST. Matt DiBenedetto, driving for Rackley W.A.R., was the fastest driver in total, with a lap of 15.574, and an average speed of 123.205 mph (198.279 km/h).

Pos.	#	Driver	Team	Make	Time	Speed
1	25	Matt DiBenedetto	Rackley W.A.R.	Chevrolet	15.574	123.205
2	52	Stewart Friesen	Halmar Friesen Racing	Toyota	15.669	122.458
3	66	Ty Majeski	ThorSport Racing	Toyota	15.692	122.279
Full practice results

== Qualifying ==
Qualifying was held on Thursday, September 15, at 5:05 PM EST. Since Bristol Motor Speedway is a short track, the qualifying system used is a single-car, two-lap system with only one round. Whoever sets the fastest time in the round wins the pole. Derek Kraus, driving for McAnally–Hilgemann Racing, scored the pole for the race, with a lap of 15.276, and an average speed of 125.609 mph (202.148 km/h).

Pos.	#	Driver	Team	Make	Time	Speed
1	19	Derek Kraus	McAnally–Hilgemann Racing	Chevrolet	15.276	125.609
2	18	Chandler Smith	Kyle Busch Motorsports	Toyota	15.279	125.584
3	52	Stewart Friesen	Halmar Friesen Racing	Toyota	15.290	125.494
4	23	Grant Enfinger	GMS Racing	Chevrolet	15.322	125.232
5	51	Corey Heim (R)	Kyle Busch Motorsports	Toyota	15.327	125.191
6	66	Ty Majeski	ThorSport Racing	Toyota	15.331	125.158
7	98	Christian Eckes	ThorSport Racing	Toyota	15.344	125.052
8	44	Bayley Currey (i)	Niece Motorsports	Chevrolet	15.372	124.824
9	25	Matt DiBenedetto	Rackley W.A.R.	Chevrolet	15.385	124.719
10	42	Carson Hocevar	Niece Motorsports	Chevrolet	15.386	124.711
11	99	Ben Rhodes	ThorSport Racing	Toyota	15.394	124.646
12	16	Tyler Ankrum	Hattori Racing Enterprises	Toyota	15.396	124.630
13	40	Dean Thompson (R)	Niece Motorsports	Chevrolet	15.397	124.622
14	7	Rajah Caruth	Spire Motorsports	Chevrolet	15.448	124.210
15	35	Jake Garcia	McAnally–Hilgemann Racing	Chevrolet	15.478	124.010
16	88	Matt Crafton	ThorSport Racing	Toyota	15.499	123.802
17	17	Taylor Gray	David Gilliland Racing	Ford	15.506	123.746
18	1	Hailie Deegan	David Gilliland Racing	Ford	15.535	123.515
19	91	Colby Howard	McAnally–Hilgemann Racing	Chevrolet	15.545	123.435
20	24	Jack Wood (R)	GMS Racing	Chevrolet	15.559	123.324
21	32	Connor Mosack	Bret Holmes Racing	Chevrolet	15.559	123.324
22	9	Blaine Perkins (R)	CR7 Motorsports	Chevrolet	15.575	123.197
23	45	Lawless Alan (R)	Niece Motorsports	Chevrolet	15.634	122.733
24	61	Chase Purdy	Hattori Racing Enterprises	Toyota	15.646	122.638
25	02	Jesse Little	Young's Motorsports	Chevrolet	15.648	122.623
26	15	Tanner Gray	David Gilliland Racing	Ford	15.649	122.615
27	30	Kaden Honeycutt	On Point Motorsports	Toyota	15.663	122.505
28	75	Parker Kligerman	Henderson Motorsports	Toyota	15.728	121.999
29	56	Timmy Hill	Hill Motorsports	Toyota	15.831	121.205
30	33	Chris Hacker	Reaume Brothers Racing	Chevrolet	15.922	120.512
31	20	Leland Honeyman	Young's Motorsports	Chevrolet	15.938	120.392
Qualified by owner's points
32	22	Austin Wayne Self	AM Racing	Chevrolet	16.077	119.351
33	12	Spencer Boyd	Young's Motorsports	Chevrolet	16.446	116.673
34	43	Josh Reaume	Reaume Brothers Racing	Toyota	16.807	114.167
35	38	Zane Smith	Front Row Motorsports	Ford	-	-
36	4	John Hunter Nemechek	Kyle Busch Motorsports	Toyota	-	-
Failed to qualify
37	90	Justin Carroll	TC Motorsports	Toyota	16.083	119.306
Official qualifying results
Official starting lineup

== Race results ==
Stage 1 Laps: 55

Pos.	#	Driver	Team	Make	Pts
1	18	Chandler Smith	Kyle Busch Motorsports	Toyota	10
2	52	Stewart Friesen	Halmar Friesen Racing	Toyota	9
3	19	Derek Kraus	McAnally–Hilgemann Racing	Chevrolet	8
4	25	Matt DiBenedetto	Rackley W.A.R.	Chevrolet	7
5	23	Grant Enfinger	GMS Racing	Chevrolet	6
6	66	Ty Majeski	ThorSport Racing	Toyota	5
7	98	Christian Eckes	ThorSport Racing	Toyota	4
8	51	Corey Heim (R)	Kyle Busch Motorsports	Toyota	3
9	44	Bayley Currey (i)	Niece Motorsports	Chevrolet	0
10	88	Matt Crafton	ThorSport Racing	Chevrolet	1

Stage 2 Laps: 55

Pos.	#	Driver	Team	Make	Pts
1	18	Chandler Smith	Kyle Busch Motorsports	Toyota	10
2	52	Stewart Friesen	Halmar Friesen Racing	Toyota	9
3	98	Christian Eckes	ThorSport Racing	Toyota	8
4	99	Ben Rhodes	ThorSport Racing	Toyota	7
5	17	Taylor Gray	David Gilliland Racing	Ford	6
6	61	Chase Purdy	Hattori Racing Enterprises	Toyota	5
7	15	Tanner Gray	David Gilliland Racing	Ford	4
8	4	John Hunter Nemechek	Kyle Busch Motorsports	Toyota	3
9	30	Kaden Honeycutt	On Point Motorsports	Toyota	2
10	38	Zane Smith	Front Row Motorsports	Ford	1

Stage 3 Laps: 90

Fin.	St	#	Driver	Team	Make	Laps	Led	Status	Pts
1	6	66	Ty Majeski	ThorSport Racing	Toyota	200	45	Running	45
2	35	38	Zane Smith	Front Row Motorsports	Ford	200	39	Running	36
3	28	75	Parker Kligerman	Henderson Motorsports	Toyota	200	0	Running	34
4	4	23	Grant Enfinger	GMS Racing	Chevrolet	200	0	Running	39
5	16	88	Matt Crafton	ThorSport Racing	Toyota	200	0	Running	33
6	1	19	Derek Kraus	McAnally–Hilgemann Racing	Chevrolet	200	27	Running	39
7	3	52	Stewart Friesen	Halmar Friesen Racing	Toyota	200	0	Running	48
8	7	98	Christian Eckes	ThorSport Racing	Toyota	200	0	Running	41
9	2	18	Chandler Smith	Kyle Busch Motorsports	Toyota	200	89	Running	48
10	5	51	Corey Heim (R)	Kyle Busch Motorsports	Toyota	200	0	Running	30
11	12	16	Tyler Ankrum	Hattori Racing Enterprises	Toyota	200	0	Running	26
12	36	4	John Hunter Nemechek	Kyle Busch Motorsports	Toyota	200	0	Running	28
13	27	30	Kaden Honeycutt	On Point Motorsports	Toyota	200	0	Running	26
14	18	1	Hailie Deegan	David Gilliland Racing	Ford	200	0	Running	23
15	8	44	Bayley Currey (i)	Niece Motorsports	Chevrolet	200	0	Running	0
16	17	17	Taylor Gray	David Gilliland Racing	Ford	200	0	Running	27
17	26	15	Tanner Gray	David Gilliland Racing	Ford	200	0	Running	24
18	11	99	Ben Rhodes	ThorSport Racing	Toyota	200	0	Running	26
19	10	42	Carson Hocevar	Niece Motorsports	Chevrolet	200	0	Running	18
20	32	22	Austin Wayne Self	AM Racing	Chevrolet	200	0	Running	17
21	20	24	Jack Wood (R)	GMS Racing	Chevrolet	200	0	Running	16
22	15	35	Jake Garcia	McAnally–Hilgemann Racing	Chevrolet	200	0	Running	15
23	23	45	Lawless Alan (R)	Niece Motorsports	Chevrolet	200	0	Running	14
24	19	91	Colby Howard	McAnally–Hilgemann Racing	Chevrolet	200	0	Running	13
25	25	02	Jesse Little	Young's Motorsports	Chevrolet	200	0	Running	12
26	29	56	Timmy Hill	Hill Motorsports	Toyota	200	0	Running	11
27	9	25	Matt DiBenedetto	Rackley W.A.R.	Chevrolet	199	0	Running	17
28	22	9	Blaine Perkins (R)	CR7 Motorsports	Chevrolet	197	0	Running	9
29	31	20	Leland Honeyman	Young's Motorsports	Chevrolet	195	0	Running	8
30	24	61	Chase Purdy	Hattori Racing Enterprises	Toyota	193	0	Running	12
31	21	32	Connor Mosack	Bret Holmes Racing	Chevrolet	192	0	Running	6
32	13	40	Dean Thompson (R)	Niece Motorsports	Chevrolet	178	0	Accident	5
33	30	33	Chris Hacker	Reaume Brothers Racing	Chevrolet	165	0	Suspension	4
34	14	7	Rajah Caruth	Spire Motorsports	Chevrolet	44	0	Accident	3
35	34	43	Josh Reaume	Reaume Brothers Racing	Toyota	34	0	Accident	2
36	33	12	Spencer Boyd	Young's Motorsports	Chevrolet	25	0	Accident	1
Official race results

== Standings after the race ==
Drivers' Championship standings

	Pos	Driver	Points
1	1	Chandler Smith	3,076
1	2	Zane Smith	3,073 (-3)
2	3	Stewart Friesen	3,061 (-15)
2	4	Ty Majeski	3,053 (-23)
2	5	John Hunter Nemechek	3,052 (-24)
2	6	Christian Eckes	3,048 (-28)
	7	Grant Enfinger	3,046 (-30)
4	8	Ben Rhodes	3,043 (-33)
1	9	Matt Crafton	2,125 (-951)
1	10	Carson Hocevar	2,117 (-959)
Official driver's standings

- Note: Only the first 10 positions are included for the driver standings.

Previous race: 2022 Kansas Lottery 200	NASCAR Camping World Truck Series; 2022 season	Next race: 2022 Chevrolet Silverado 250
