= Shane Wilson (racing) =

NASCAR crew chief (born 1968)

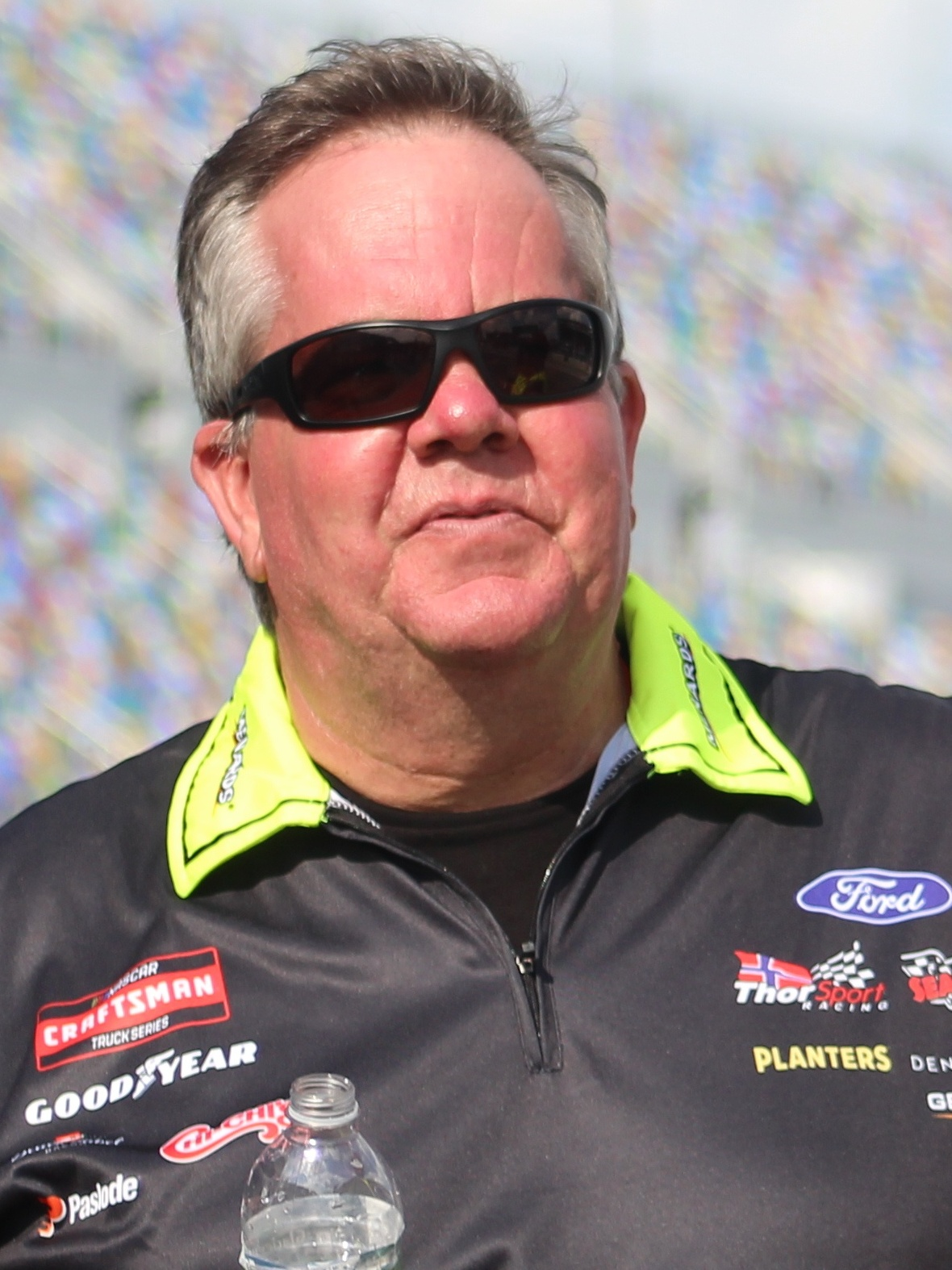
- Wilson at Daytona International Speedway in 2023

Personal information
- Born: Shane Theodore Wilson; November 3, 1968 (age 57) South Royalton, Vermont, U.S.

Sport
- Country: United States
- Sport: ARCA Menards Series
- Team: No. 25 (Nitro Motorsports)

Shane Theodore Wilson (born November 3, 1968) is an American NASCAR crew chief who works for Nitro Motorsports as the crew chief of their No. 25 Toyota Camry in the ARCA Menards Series.

In addition to ARCA, Wilson has previously served as a crew chief in the NASCAR Cup Series, what is now the NASCAR O'Reilly Auto Parts Series as well as the NASCAR Craftsman Truck Series. He previously crew chiefed for Team Penske, Richard Childress Racing, JGL Racing, Fury Race Cars, RSS Racing, David Gilliland Racing, McAnally–Hilgemann Racing, Bassett Racing, ThorSport Racing, Rackley W.A.R. and 1/4 Ley Racing.

== Racing career ==
Wilson began his career in Vermont, building race cars before earning a driver's license. In 1988, he won a local touring division championship along with Brian Kenyon. In 1989, Wilson joined Alsup Racing of the American Canadian Tour as a mechanic for Mike Bachelor. Four years later, Wilson joined the NASCAR All-Pro Series and subsequently worked with Hendrick Motorsports in the Craftsman Truck Series.

In 2000, Wilson joined Orleans Racing as the crew chief and general manager for Brendan Gaughan, and won two K&N Pro Series West titles, while finishing fourth in the 2003 NASCAR Craftsman Truck Series standings. In 2004, Wilson and Gaughan joined Penske Racing, with Gaughan driving the No. 77 in the Nextel Cup Series until 2005, in which he was replaced by Travis Kvapil.

=== 2006–2017: Richard Childress Racing ===
==== 2006–2008 ====
In December 2005, Wilson joined Richard Childress Racing as the crew chief for the No. 21 of Kevin Harvick in the Busch Series. Wilson proceeded to lead Harvick to the Busch Series championship in 2006 by a record margin of 824 points. Wilson worked with Harvick until 2008, in which he joined RCR's development program. In 2009, Wilson became the crew chief in the Sprint Cup Series for Clint Bowyer and the No. 33 team, with Wilson winning his first Sprint Cup race with Bowyer in the 2010 Sylvania 300. However, after the race, Bowyer's car failed a post-race inspection, and Wilson was suspended for the next six races of the season. The following season, Wilson guided Bowyer to RCR's 100th victory in the 2011 Good Sam Club 500.

==== 2012 ====
Bowyer left RCR for Michael Waltrip Racing in 2012, and after the team decided to close down the No. 33 car and go from four full-time Cup cars to three that year, Wilson reunited with Harvick and became the crew chief of his No. 29 Cup Series car. Harvick had requested the removal of his 2011 crew chief, Gil Martin, in favor of Wilson for 2012 after two consecutive third-place finishes in the standings. After he and Harvick struggled for most of the season, Wilson was reassigned and Martin returned as Harvick's crew chief in August after the Bristol Night Race. Wilson would then become the interim crew chief for Paul Menard's No. 27 car after Menard's crew chief, Slugger Labbe, was suspended. For the final three races of the season, Wilson replaced Drew Blickensderfer as Jeff Burton's crew chief on the No. 31 car. As a result, Wilson crew chiefed for all three of RCR's Cup cars at one point or another during the 2012 season.

=== 2018: JGL Racing and Fury Race Cars ===
Wilson served as crew chief for Kaz Grala after leaving Richard Childress Racing. Wilson and Grala finished 2018 with two top-fives and five top-tens.

=== 2019–2021: RSS Racing and DGR ===
After a very successful year as Ryan Sieg's crew chief in the Xfinity Series in 2019, Wilson left for DGR-Crosley, where he was announced as the crew chief for rookie Tanner Gray's No. 15 team in the Truck Series for 2020. Wilson returned to crew chief Gray and the No. 15 truck for the renamed David Gilliland Racing in 2021, but would be released by the team before the race at Kansas in May. RSS would quickly rehire Wilson just a few days later, and he would return to his previous job as crew chief of Ryan Sieg's No. 39 in the Xfinity Series beginning at Darlington in May. Following the Indianapolis race on August 14, Wilson was suspended for four races after the car lost its left rear tire and caused a caution during the race. RSS Racing decided to release Wilson instead of appealing his penalty. Wilson spent the rest of the 2021 without a crew chiefing job.

=== 2022–2023: McAnally–Hilgemann, Bassett and ThorSport Racing ===
It was announced on January 11, 2022 that Wilson would go back to the Truck Series to be the crew chief for the No. 19 McAnally–Hilgemann Racing truck driven by Derek Kraus in 2022. Kraus' previous crew chief, Mark Hillman, moved to MHR's new second truck, the No. 91 of Colby Howard. For the race at Nashville, Wilson was suspended due to an improperly installed ballast on the No. 19 truck.

On July 2, 2022, it was announced that Wilson would be replaced by Charles Denike, who was previously the crew chief of the GMS Racing No. 23 truck driven by Grant Enfinger. On June 29, 2022, it was announced that Denike would be replaced at GMS by Jeff Hensley, who started the season as the new crew chief for Matt Crafton and the No. 88 ThorSport Racing truck. After losing his job with McAnally, Wilson would join Bassett Racing as the crew chief of their part-time No. 77 car in the Xfinity Series, driven by brothers Ronnie Bassett Jr. and Dillon Bassett. In August, Wilson left the team for ThorSport Racing to replace Hensley as Matt Crafton's crew chief. He spent 11 races as Crafton's crew chief before he and the team parted ways.

=== 2024–present: Rackley W.A.R., 1/4 Ley Racing and Nitro Motorsports ===
On January 9, 2024, it was announced that Wilson would be the crew chief for Ty Dillon at Rackley W.A.R.

On November 21, 2024, Rackley W.A.R. announced that Chad Kendrick, who was the team's full-time crew chief in 2023, would return to the team after crew chiefing for one year with Jordan Anderson Racing in the Xfinity Series in 2024, leaving Wilson without a job. He crew chiefed for Dale Quarterley's team, 1/4 Ley Racing, in the Truck and ARCA Series races they attempted in 2025.

In 2026, Wilson joined Nitro Motorsports (in the team's first year after purchasing longtime ARCA team Venturini Motorsports) to serve as an ARCA crew chief on their No. 25 car.
