= 2023 Explore the Pocono Mountains 225 =

19th race of the 2023 NASCAR Xfinity Series

Race details
- Race 19 of 33 of the 2023 NASCAR Xfinity Series
- Date: July 22, 2023
- Official name: 8th Annual Explore the Pocono Mountains 225
- Location: Pocono Raceway, Long Pond, Pennsylvania
- Course: Permanent racing facility
- Course length: 2.5 miles (4.0 km)
- Distance: 92 laps, 230 mi (370 km)
- Scheduled distance: 90 laps, 225 mi (362 km)
- Average speed: 122.922 mph (197.824 km/h)

Pole position
Driver	Josh Berry	JR Motorsports
- Time: 53.587

Most laps led
Driver	Josh Berry	JR Motorsports
- Laps: 51

Winner
No. 21	Austin Hill	Richard Childress Racing

Television in the United States
- Network: USA
- Announcers: Rick Allen, Steve Letarte, and Dale Earnhardt Jr.

Radio in the United States
- Radio: MRN

The 2023 Explore the Pocono Mountains 225 was the 19th stock car race of the 2023 NASCAR Xfinity Series, and the 29th iteration of the event. The race was held on Saturday, July 22, 2023, in Long Pond, Pennsylvania at Pocono Raceway, a 2.0 miles (3.2 km) permanent triangular-shaped racetrack. The race was originally scheduled to be contested over 90 laps, but was extended to 92 laps due to a NASCAR overtime finish. Austin Hill, driving for Richard Childress Racing, would have a wild battle with Josh Berry on the final lap, and held on to win the race after the final caution came out. This was Hill's sixth career NASCAR Xfinity Series win, and his fourth of the season. Berry had dominated the entire race, leading a race-high 51 laps, until he hit the wall on the final lap, dropping him back to the 24th position. To fill out the podium, Sam Mayer, driving for JR Motorsports, and Chase Elliott, driving for Hendrick Motorsports, would finish 2nd and 3rd, respectively.

== Background ==
Pocono Raceway is a 2.5-mile (4.0 km) oval speedway located in Long Pond, Pennsylvania, which has hosted NASCAR racing annually since the early 1970s. Nicknamed "The Tricky Triangle", the speedway has three distinct corners and is known for high speeds along its lengthy straightaways.

From 1982 to 2019, the circuit had two race weekends. In 2020, the circuit was reduced to one race meeting of two races. The first race was moved to World Wide Technology Raceway near St. Louis starting in 2022.

=== Entry list ===
- (R) denotes rookie driver.
- (i) denotes driver who is ineligible for series driver points.

#	Driver	Team	Make
00	Cole Custer	Stewart-Haas Racing	Ford
1	Sam Mayer	JR Motorsports	Chevrolet
02	Blaine Perkins (R)	Our Motorsports	Chevrolet
2	Sheldon Creed	Richard Childress Racing	Chevrolet
3	Ty Dillon (i)	Richard Childress Racing	Chevrolet
4	Kyle Weatherman	JD Motorsports	Chevrolet
6	Brennan Poole	JD Motorsports	Chevrolet
07	Stefan Parsons	SS-Green Light Racing	Chevrolet
7	Justin Allgaier	JR Motorsports	Chevrolet
08	Alex Labbé	SS-Green Light Racing	Ford
8	Josh Berry	JR Motorsports	Chevrolet
9	Brandon Jones	JR Motorsports	Chevrolet
10	Daniel Suárez (i)	Kaulig Racing	Chevrolet
11	Daniel Hemric	Kaulig Racing	Chevrolet
16	Chandler Smith (R)	Kaulig Racing	Chevrolet
17	Chase Elliott (i)	Hendrick Motorsports	Chevrolet
18	Sammy Smith (R)	Joe Gibbs Racing	Toyota
19	Connor Mosack (R)	Joe Gibbs Racing	Toyota
20	John Hunter Nemechek	Joe Gibbs Racing	Toyota
21	Austin Hill	Richard Childress Racing	Chevrolet
24	Corey Heim (i)	Sam Hunt Racing	Toyota
25	Brett Moffitt	AM Racing	Ford
26	Kaz Grala	Sam Hunt Racing	Toyota
27	Jeb Burton	Jordan Anderson Racing	Chevrolet
28	Kyle Sieg	RSS Racing	Ford
31	Parker Retzlaff (R)	Jordan Anderson Racing	Chevrolet
35	Joey Gase	Emerling-Gase Motorsports	Chevrolet
38	Joe Graf Jr.	RSS Racing	Ford
39	Ryan Sieg	RSS Racing	Ford
43	Ryan Ellis	Alpha Prime Racing	Chevrolet
44	Sage Karam	Alpha Prime Racing	Chevrolet
45	Jeffrey Earnhardt	Alpha Prime Racing	Chevrolet
48	Parker Kligerman	Big Machine Racing	Chevrolet
51	Jeremy Clements	Jeremy Clements Racing	Chevrolet
53	Patrick Emerling	Emerling-Gase Motorsports	Chevrolet
66	Timmy Hill (i)	MBM Motorsports	Toyota
74	Dawson Cram	CHK Racing	Chevrolet
78	Anthony Alfredo	B. J. McLeod Motorsports	Chevrolet
91	Chad Chastain (i)	DGM Racing	Chevrolet
92	Josh Williams	DGM Racing	Chevrolet
98	Riley Herbst	Stewart-Haas Racing	Ford
Official entry list

== Practice ==
The first and only practice session was held on Friday, July 21, at 3:35 PM EST, and would last for 20 minutes. Justin Allgaier, driving for JR Motorsports, would set the fastest time in the session, with a lap of 54.721, and an average speed of 164.471 mph (264.690 km/h).

Pos.	#	Driver	Team	Make	Time	Speed
1	7	Justin Allgaier	JR Motorsports	Chevrolet	54.721	164.471
2	00	Cole Custer	Stewart-Haas Racing	Ford	54.743	164.405
3	21	Austin Hill	Richard Childress Racing	Chevrolet	54.816	164.186
Full practice results

== Qualifying ==
Qualifying was held on Friday, July 21, at 4:05 PM EST. Since Pocono Raceway is a superspeedway, the qualifying system used is a single-car, one-lap system with only one round. In that round, whoever sets the fastest time will win the pole. Josh Berry, driving for JR Motorsports, would score the pole for the race, with a lap of 53.587, and an average speed of 167.951 mph (270.291 km/h).

Pos.	#	Driver	Team	Make	Time	Speed
1	8	Josh Berry	JR Motorsports	Chevrolet	53.587	167.951
2	11	Daniel Hemric	Kaulig Racing	Chevrolet	53.851	167.128
3	2	Sheldon Creed	Richard Childress Racing	Chevrolet	53.891	167.004
4	19	Connor Mosack (R)	Joe Gibbs Racing	Toyota	53.898	166.982
5	20	John Hunter Nemechek	Joe Gibbs Racing	Toyota	53.946	166.834
6	18	Sammy Smith (R)	Joe Gibbs Racing	Toyota	53.973	166.750
7	9	Brandon Jones	JR Motorsports	Chevrolet	54.046	166.525
8	1	Sam Mayer	JR Motorsports	Chevrolet	54.049	166.516
9	7	Justin Allgaier	JR Motorsports	Chevrolet	54.134	166.254
10	00	Cole Custer	Stewart-Haas Racing	Ford	54.136	166.248
11	21	Austin Hill	Richard Childress Racing	Chevrolet	54.235	165.945
12	27	Jeb Burton	Jordan Anderson Racing	Chevrolet	54.241	165.926
13	17	Chase Elliott (i)	Hendrick Motorsports	Chevrolet	54.286	165.789
14	51	Jeremy Clements	Jeremy Clements Racing	Chevrolet	54.321	165.682
15	24	Corey Heim (i)	Sam Hunt Racing	Toyota	54.394	165.459
16	16	Chandler Smith (R)	Kaulig Racing	Chevrolet	54.440	165.320
17	39	Ryan Sieg	RSS Racing	Ford	54.444	165.307
18	25	Brett Moffitt	AM Racing	Ford	54.445	165.304
19	31	Parker Retzlaff (R)	Jordan Anderson Racing	Chevrolet	54.448	165.295
20	28	Kyle Sieg	RSS Racing	Ford	54.504	165.125
21	98	Riley Herbst	Stewart-Haas Racing	Ford	54.575	164.911
22	48	Parker Kligerman	Big Machine Racing	Chevrolet	54.579	164.899
23	10	Daniel Suárez (i)	Kaulig Racing	Chevrolet	54.601	164.832
24	26	Kaz Grala	Sam Hunt Racing	Toyota	54.742	164.408
25	3	Ty Dillon (i)	Richard Childress Racing	Chevrolet	54.825	164.159
26	78	Anthony Alfredo	B. J. McLeod Motorsports	Chevrolet	54.912	163.899
27	43	Ryan Ellis	Alpha Prime Racing	Chevrolet	55.233	162.946
28	92	Josh Williams	DGM Racing	Chevrolet	55.334	162.649
29	44	Sage Karam	Alpha Prime Racing	Chevrolet	55.349	162.605
30	38	Joe Graf Jr.	RSS Racing	Ford	55.503	162.153
31	6	Brennan Poole	JD Motorsports	Chevrolet	55.749	161.438
32	08	Alex Labbé	SS-Green Light Racing	Ford	55.805	161.276
33	91	Chad Chastain (i)	DGM Racing	Chevrolet	55.872	161.082
Qualified by owner's points
34	4	Garrett Smithley	JD Motorsports	Chevrolet	55.875	161.074
35	45	Jeffrey Earnhardt	Alpha Prime Racing	Chevrolet	55.975	160.786
36	53	Patrick Emerling	Emerling-Gase Motorsports	Chevrolet	56.125	160.356
37	35	Joey Gase	Emerling-Gase Motorsports	Chevrolet	56.274	159.932
38	02	Blaine Perkins (R)	Our Motorsports	Chevrolet	56.278	159.920
Failed to qualify
39	74	Dawson Cram	CHK Racing	Chevrolet	56.018	160.663
40	66	Timmy Hill (i)	MBM Motorsports	Toyota	56.318	159.807
41	07	Stefan Parsons	SS-Green Light Racing	Chevrolet	56.424	159.507
Official qualifying results
Official starting lineup

== Race results ==
Stage 1 Laps: 20

Pos.	#	Driver	Team	Make	Pts
1	8	Josh Berry	JR Motorsports	Chevrolet	10
2	11	Daniel Hemric	Kaulig Racing	Chevrolet	9
3	20	John Hunter Nemechek	Joe Gibbs Racing	Toyota	8
4	18	Sammy Smith (R)	Joe Gibbs Racing	Toyota	7
5	2	Sheldon Creed	Richard Childress Racing	Chevrolet	6
6	9	Brandon Jones	JR Motorsports	Chevrolet	5
7	1	Sam Mayer	JR Motorsports	Chevrolet	4
8	7	Justin Allgaier	JR Motorsports	Chevrolet	3
9	19	Connor Mosack (R)	Joe Gibbs Racing	Toyota	2
10	21	Austin Hill	Richard Childress Racing	Chevrolet	1

Stage 2 Laps: 20

Pos.	#	Driver	Team	Make	Pts
1	8	Josh Berry	JR Motorsports	Chevrolet	10
2	7	Justin Allgaier	JR Motorsports	Chevrolet	9
3	20	John Hunter Nemechek	Joe Gibbs Racing	Toyota	8
4	9	Brandon Jones	JR Motorsports	Chevrolet	7
5	00	Cole Custer	Stewart-Haas Racing	Ford	6
6	18	Sammy Smith (R)	Joe Gibbs Racing	Toyota	5
7	1	Sam Mayer	JR Motorsports	Chevrolet	4
8	98	Riley Herbst	Stewart-Haas Racing	Ford	3
9	11	Daniel Hemric	Kaulig Racing	Chevrolet	2
10	16	Chandler Smith (R)	Kaulig Racing	Chevrolet	1

Stage 3 Laps: 52

Pos.	St	#	Driver	Team	Make	Laps	Led	Status	Pts
1	11	21	Austin Hill	Richard Childress Racing	Chevrolet	92	2	Running	41
2	8	1	Sam Mayer	JR Motorsports	Chevrolet	92	0	Running	43
3	13	17	Chase Elliott (i)	Hendrick Motorsports	Chevrolet	92	9	Running	0
4	21	98	Riley Herbst	Stewart-Haas Racing	Ford	92	3	Running	36
5	2	11	Daniel Hemric	Kaulig Racing	Chevrolet	92	0	Running	43
6	6	18	Sammy Smith (R)	Joe Gibbs Racing	Toyota	92	0	Running	43
7	7	9	Brandon Jones	JR Motorsports	Chevrolet	92	12	Running	42
8	18	25	Brett Moffitt	AM Racing	Ford	92	0	Running	29
9	22	48	Parker Kligerman	Big Machine Racing	Chevrolet	92	0	Running	28
10	23	10	Daniel Suárez (i)	Kaulig Racing	Chevrolet	92	5	Running	0
11	3	2	Sheldon Creed	Richard Childress Racing	Chevrolet	92	0	Running	32
12	12	27	Jeb Burton	Jordan Anderson Racing	Chevrolet	92	0	Running	25
13	26	78	Anthony Alfredo	B. J. McLeod Motorsports	Chevrolet	92	0	Running	24
14	25	3	Ty Dillon (i)	Richard Childress Racing	Chevrolet	92	0	Running	0
15	14	51	Jeremy Clements	Jeremy Clements Racing	Chevrolet	92	0	Running	22
16	20	28	Kyle Sieg	RSS Racing	Ford	92	0	Running	21
17	30	38	Joe Graf Jr.	RSS Racing	Ford	92	0	Running	20
18	27	43	Ryan Ellis	Alpha Prime Racing	Chevrolet	92	0	Running	19
19	35	45	Jeffrey Earnhardt	Alpha Prime Racing	Chevrolet	92	0	Running	18
20	16	16	Chandler Smith (R)	Kaulig Racing	Chevrolet	92	0	Running	18
21	34	4	Garrett Smithley	JD Motorsports	Chevrolet	92	0	Running	16
22	17	39	Ryan Sieg	RSS Racing	Ford	92	0	Running	15
23	9	7	Justin Allgaier	JR Motorsports	Chevrolet	92	8	Running	26
24	1	8	Josh Berry	JR Motorsports	Chevrolet	91	51	Running	33
25	24	26	Kaz Grala	Sam Hunt Racing	Toyota	91	0	Running	12
26	36	53	Patrick Emerling	Emerling-Gase Motorsports	Chevrolet	91	0	Running	11
27	38	02	Blaine Perkins (R)	Our Motorsports	Chevrolet	91	0	Running	10
28	32	08	Alex Labbé	SS-Green Light Racing	Ford	91	0	Running	9
29	31	6	Brennan Poole	JD Motorsports	Chevrolet	91	0	Running	8
30	33	91	Chad Chastain (i)	DGM Racing	Chevrolet	91	0	Running	0
31	37	35	Joey Gase	Emerling-Gase Motorsports	Chevrolet	90	0	Running	6
32	5	20	John Hunter Nemechek	Joe Gibbs Racing	Toyota	89	0	Running	21
33	10	00	Cole Custer	Stewart-Haas Racing	Ford	87	2	Running	10
34	4	19	Connor Mosack (R)	Joe Gibbs Racing	Toyota	85	0	Accident	5
35	19	31	Parker Retzlaff (R)	Jordan Anderson Racing	Chevrolet	84	0	Running	2
36	28	92	Josh Williams	DGM Racing	Chevrolet	82	0	Running	1
37	15	24	Corey Heim (i)	Sam Hunt Racing	Toyota	81	0	Suspension	0
38	29	44	Sage Karam	Alpha Prime Racing	Chevrolet	7	0	Transmission	1
Official race results

== Standings after the race ==
Drivers' Championship standings

Pos	Driver	Points
1	John Hunter Nemechek	751
2	Austin Hill	738 (-13)
3	Justin Allgaier	696 (–55)
4	Cole Custer	666 (–85)
5	Chandler Smith	587 (–164)
6	Josh Berry	577 (–174)
7	Daniel Hemric	553 (–198)
8	Sammy Smith	548 (–203)
9	Sam Mayer	545 (–206)
10	Sheldon Creed	516 (–235)
11	Riley Herbst	493 (–258)
12	Parker Kligerman	467 (–284)
Official driver's standings

- Note: Only the first 12 positions are included for the driver standings.

Previous race: 2023 Ambetter Health 200	NASCAR Xfinity Series; 2023 season	Next race: 2023 Road America 180
