= 2023 Tennessee Lottery 250 =

15th race of the 2023 NASCAR Xfinity Series

Race details
- Race 15 of 33 of the 2023 NASCAR Xfinity Series
- Date: June 24, 2023
- Official name: 3rd Annual Tennessee Lottery 250
- Location: Nashville Superspeedway, Gladeville, Tennessee
- Course: Permanent racing facility
- Course length: 1.333 miles (2.145 km)
- Distance: 196 laps, 260 mi (418 km)
- Scheduled distance: 188 laps, 250 mi (400 km)
- Average speed: 97.542 mph (156.979 km/h)

Pole position
Driver	Cole Custer	Stewart-Haas Racing
- Time: 30.493

Most laps led
Driver	Chandler Smith	Kaulig Racing
- Laps: 74

Winner
No. 10	A. J. Allmendinger	Kaulig Racing

Television in the United States
- Network: USA
- Announcers: Rick Allen, Jeff Burton, Steve Letarte, and Dale Earnhardt Jr.

Radio in the United States
- Radio: PRN

The 2023 Tennessee Lottery 250 was the 15th stock car race of the 2023 NASCAR Xfinity Series, and the 3rd iteration of the event. The race was held on Saturday, June 24, 2023, in Gladeville, Tennessee at Nashville Superspeedway, a 1.333 miles (2.145 km) permanent tri-oval shaped racetrack. The race was originally scheduled to be contested over 188 laps, but was extended to 196 laps due to a NASCAR overtime finish. In a race that saw multiple cautions, A. J. Allmendinger, driving for Kaulig Racing, would dominate the final portions of the race, and hold off the field on the final restart to earn his 17th career NASCAR Xfinity Series win, and his second of the season. Allmendinger's teammate, Chandler Smith, dominated the majority of the race, leading a race-high 74 laps. To fill out the podium, Riley Herbst, driving for Stewart-Haas Racing, and Sam Mayer, driving for JR Motorsports, would finish 2nd and 3rd, respectively.

== Background ==
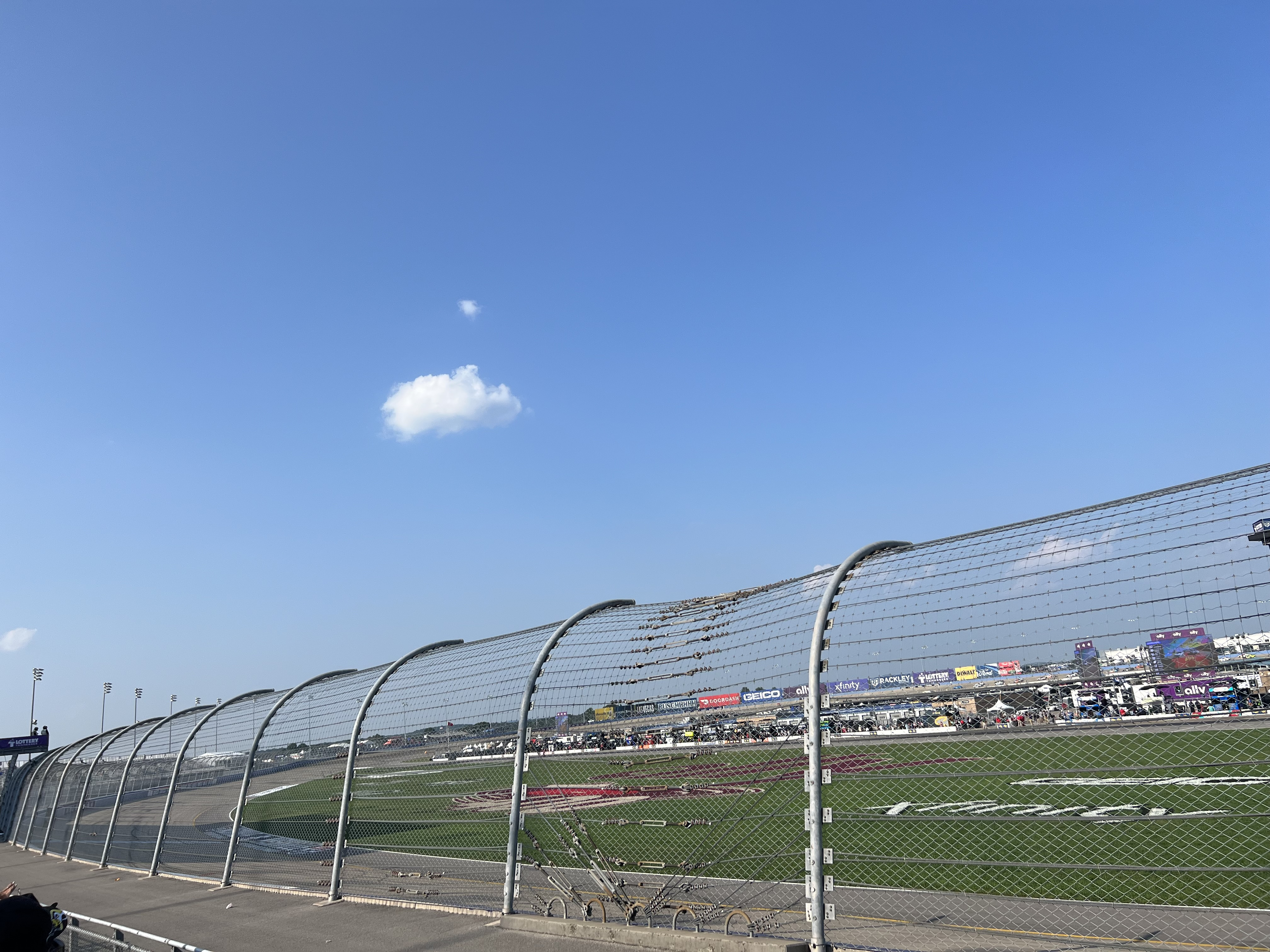
Nashville Superspeedway, the place where the race was held.

Nashville Superspeedway is a motor racing complex located in Gladeville, Tennessee, United States, about 30 miles (48 km) southeast of Nashville. The track was built in 2001 and is currently used for events, driving schools and GT Academy, a reality television competition.

It is a concrete oval track 1 1/3 miles (2.146 km) long. Nashville Superspeedway is owned by Speedway Motorsports, which also owns many other NASCAR tracks. Nashville Superspeedway was the longest concrete oval in NASCAR during the time it was on the NASCAR Xfinity Series and NASCAR Craftsman Truck Series circuits. Current permanent seating capacity is approximately 25,000. Additional portable seats are brought in for some events, and seating capacity can be expanded to 150,000. Infrastructure is in place to expand the facility to include a short track, drag strip, and road course.

=== Entry list ===
- (R) denotes rookie driver.
- (i) denotes driver who is ineligible for series driver points.

#	Driver	Team	Make
00	Cole Custer	Stewart-Haas Racing	Ford
1	Sam Mayer	JR Motorsports	Chevrolet
02	Blaine Perkins (R)	Our Motorsports	Chevrolet
2	Sheldon Creed	Richard Childress Racing	Chevrolet
4	Kyle Weatherman	JD Motorsports	Chevrolet
6	Brennan Poole	JD Motorsports	Chevrolet
07	Stefan Parsons	SS-Green Light Racing	Chevrolet
7	Justin Allgaier	JR Motorsports	Chevrolet
08	Mason Massey	SS-Green Light Racing	Ford
8	Josh Berry	JR Motorsports	Chevrolet
9	Brandon Jones	JR Motorsports	Chevrolet
10	A. J. Allmendinger (i)	Kaulig Racing	Chevrolet
11	Daniel Hemric	Kaulig Racing	Chevrolet
16	Chandler Smith (R)	Kaulig Racing	Chevrolet
18	Sammy Smith (R)	Joe Gibbs Racing	Toyota
19	Ty Gibbs (i)	Joe Gibbs Racing	Toyota
20	John Hunter Nemechek	Joe Gibbs Racing	Toyota
21	Austin Hill	Richard Childress Racing	Chevrolet
24	Connor Mosack (R)	Sam Hunt Racing	Toyota
25	Brett Moffitt	AM Racing	Ford
26	Kaz Grala	Sam Hunt Racing	Toyota
27	Jeb Burton	Jordan Anderson Racing	Chevrolet
28	Zane Smith (i)	RSS Racing	Ford
29	Kyle Sieg	RSS Racing	Ford
31	Parker Retzlaff (R)	Jordan Anderson Racing	Chevrolet
35	David Starr	Emerling-Gase Motorsports	Chevrolet
38	Joe Graf Jr.	RSS Racing	Ford
39	Ryan Sieg	RSS Racing	Ford
43	Ryan Ellis	Alpha Prime Racing	Chevrolet
44	Sage Karam	Alpha Prime Racing	Chevrolet
45	Jeffrey Earnhardt	Alpha Prime Racing	Chevrolet
48	Parker Kligerman	Big Machine Racing	Chevrolet
51	Jeremy Clements	Jeremy Clements Racing	Chevrolet
53	Joey Gase (Note: C. J. McLaughlin, the original driver of the 53 car, was replaced by Joey Gase for qualifying and the race, after McLaughlin wrecked the team's primary car in practice.)	Emerling-Gase Motorsports	Ford
66	Chad Finchum	MBM Motorsports	Ford
74	Dawson Cram	CHK Racing	Chevrolet
77	Carson Hocevar (i)	Spire Motorsports	Chevrolet
78	Anthony Alfredo	B. J. McLeod Motorsports	Chevrolet
91	Chad Chastain (i)	DGM Racing	Chevrolet
92	Josh Williams	DGM Racing	Chevrolet
98	Riley Herbst	Stewart-Haas Racing	Ford
Official entry list

== Practice ==
The first and only practice session was held on Friday, June 23, at 4:35 PM CST, and would last for 50 minutes. Ty Gibbs, driving for Joe Gibbs Racing, would set the fastest time in the session, with a lap of 30.787, and an average speed of 155.520 mph (250.285 km/h).

Pos.	#	Driver	Team	Make	Time	Speed
1	19	Ty Gibbs (i)	Joe Gibbs Racing	Toyota	30.787	155.520
2	00	Cole Custer	Stewart-Haas Racing	Ford	30.927	154.816
3	98	Riley Herbst	Stewart-Haas Racing	Ford	30.953	154.686
Full practice results

== Qualifying ==
Qualifying was held on Saturday, June 24, at 11:00 AM CST. Since Nashville Superspeedway is an intermediate racetrack, the qualifying system used is a single-car, one-lap system with only one round. In that round, whoever sets the fastest time will win the pole. Cole Custer, driving for Stewart-Haas Racing, would score the pole for the race, with a lap of 30.493, and an average speed of 157.020 mph (252.699 km/h).

Pos.	#	Driver	Team	Make	Time	Speed
1	00	Cole Custer	Stewart-Haas Racing	Ford	30.493	157.020
2	16	Chandler Smith (R)	Kaulig Racing	Chevrolet	30.633	156.302
3	18	Sammy Smith (R)	Joe Gibbs Racing	Toyota	30.676	156.083
4	19	Ty Gibbs (i)	Joe Gibbs Racing	Toyota	30.753	155.692
5	98	Riley Herbst	Stewart-Haas Racing	Ford	30.761	155.652
6	28	Zane Smith (i)	RSS Racing	Ford	30.805	155.429
7	21	Austin Hill	Richard Childress Racing	Chevrolet	30.850	155.203
8	77	Carson Hocevar (i)	Spire Motorsports	Chevrolet	30.854	155.182
9	29	Kyle Sieg	RSS Racing	Ford	30.874	155.082
10	31	Parker Retzlaff (R)	Jordan Anderson Racing	Chevrolet	30.931	154.796
11	10	A. J. Allmendinger (i)	Kaulig Racing	Chevrolet	30.961	154.646
12	27	Jeb Burton	Jordan Anderson Racing	Chevrolet	30.974	154.581
13	48	Parker Kligerman	Big Machine Racing	Chevrolet	31.001	154.447
14	39	Ryan Sieg	RSS Racing	Ford	31.004	154.432
15	9	Brandon Jones	JR Motorsports	Chevrolet	31.018	154.362
16	7	Justin Allgaier	JR Motorsports	Chevrolet	31.020	154.352
17	38	Joe Graf Jr.	RSS Racing	Ford	31.041	154.248
18	07	Stefan Parsons	SS-Green Light Racing	Chevrolet	31.051	154.198
19	2	Sheldon Creed	Richard Childress Racing	Chevrolet	31.063	154.138
20	26	Kaz Grala	Sam Hunt Racing	Toyota	31.136	153.777
21	20	John Hunter Nemechek	Joe Gibbs Racing	Toyota	31.198	153.471
22	91	Chad Chastain (i)	DGM Racing	Chevrolet	31.206	153.432
23	8	Josh Berry	JR Motorsports	Chevrolet	31.229	153.319
24	51	Jeremy Clements	Jeremy Clements Racing	Chevrolet	31.240	153.265
25	43	Ryan Ellis	Alpha Prime Racing	Chevrolet	31.290	153.020
26	25	Brett Moffitt	AM Racing	Ford	31.337	152.791
27	02	Blaine Perkins (R)	Our Motorsports	Chevrolet	31.361	152.674
28	78	Anthony Alfredo	B. J. McLeod Motorsports	Chevrolet	31.366	152.649
29	92	Josh Williams	DGM Racing	Chevrolet	31.416	152.406
30	45	Jeffrey Earnhardt	Alpha Prime Racing	Chevrolet	31.437	152.305
31	08	Mason Massey	SS-Green Light Racing	Ford	31.476	152.116
32	4	Kyle Weatherman	JD Motorsports	Chevrolet	31.515	151.928
33	11	Daniel Hemric	Kaulig Racing	Chevrolet	31.557	151.725
Qualified by owner's points
34	1	Sam Mayer	JR Motorsports	Chevrolet	31.606	151.490
35	6	Brennan Poole	JD Motorsports	Chevrolet	31.970	149.765
36	35	David Starr	Emerling-Gase Motorsports	Chevrolet	32.244	148.493
37	53	Joey Gase	Emerling-Gase Motorsports	Ford	32.715	146.355
38	24	Connor Mosack (R)	Sam Hunt Racing	Toyota	–	–
Failed to qualify
39	44	Sage Karam	Alpha Prime Racing	Chevrolet	31.625	151.399
40	66	Chad Finchum	MBM Motorsports	Ford	31.700	151.041
41	74	Dawson Cram	CHK Racing	Chevrolet	31.757	150.770
Official qualifying results
Official starting lineup

== Race results ==
Stage 1 Laps: 45

Pos.	#	Driver	Team	Make	Pts
1	19	Ty Gibbs (i)	Joe Gibbs Racing	Toyota	0
2	00	Cole Custer	Stewart-Haas Racing	Ford	9
3	10	A. J. Allmendinger (i)	Kaulig Racing	Chevrolet	0
4	77	Carson Hocevar (i)	Spire Motorsports	Chevrolet	0
5	18	Sammy Smith (R)	Joe Gibbs Racing	Toyota	6
6	16	Chandler Smith (R)	Kaulig Racing	Chevrolet	5
7	98	Riley Herbst	Stewart-Haas Racing	Ford	4
8	1	Sam Mayer	JR Motorsports	Chevrolet	3
9	20	John Hunter Nemechek	Joe Gibbs Racing	Toyota	2
10	48	Parker Kligerman	Big Machine Racing	Chevrolet	1

Stage 2 Laps: 50

Pos.	#	Driver	Team	Make	Pts
1	16	Chandler Smith (R)	Kaulig Racing	Chevrolet	10
2	00	Cole Custer	Stewart-Haas Racing	Ford	9
3	11	Daniel Hemric	Kaulig Racing	Chevrolet	8
4	1	Sam Mayer	JR Motorsports	Chevrolet	7
5	98	Riley Herbst	Stewart-Haas Racing	Ford	6
6	20	John Hunter Nemechek	Joe Gibbs Racing	Toyota	5
7	28	Zane Smith (i)	RSS Racing	Ford	0
8	8	Josh Berry	JR Motorsports	Chevrolet	3
9	31	Parker Retzlaff (R)	Jordan Anderson Racing	Chevrolet	2
10	25	Brett Moffitt	AM Racing	Ford	1

Stage 3 Laps: 101

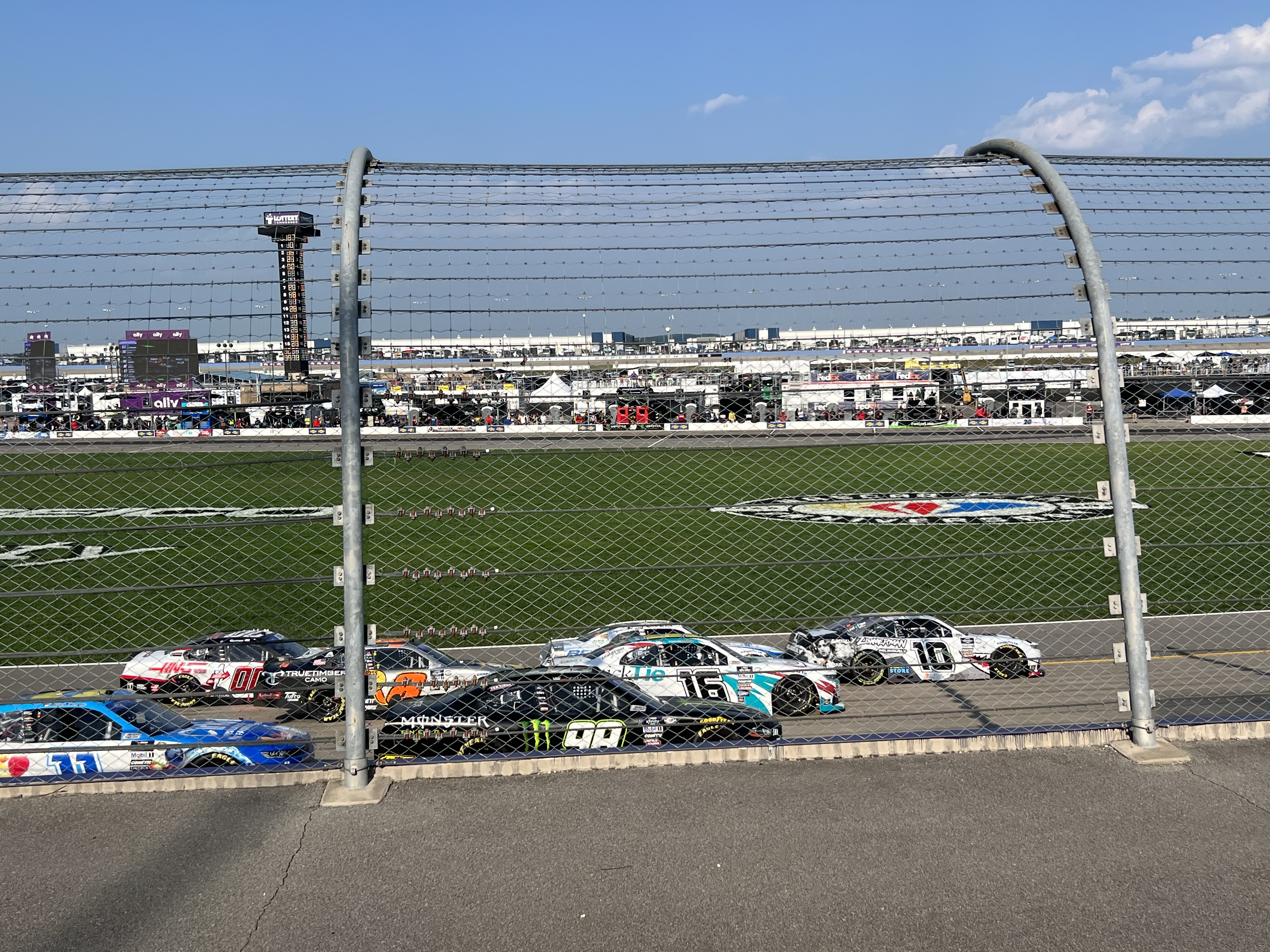
The next to last restart

Pos.	St	#	Driver	Team	Make	Laps	Led	Status	Pts
1	11	10	A. J. Allmendinger (i)	Kaulig Racing	Chevrolet	196	25	Running	0
2	5	98	Riley Herbst	Stewart-Haas Racing	Ford	196	0	Running	45
3	34	1	Sam Mayer	JR Motorsports	Chevrolet	196	6	Running	44
4	7	21	Austin Hill	Richard Childress Racing	Chevrolet	196	3	Running	33
5	23	8	Josh Berry	JR Motorsports	Chevrolet	196	1	Running	35
6	21	20	John Hunter Nemechek	Joe Gibbs Racing	Toyota	196	0	Running	38
7	6	28	Zane Smith (i)	RSS Racing	Ford	196	0	Running	0
8	33	11	Daniel Hemric	Kaulig Racing	Chevrolet	196	1	Running	37
9	1	00	Cole Custer	Stewart-Haas Racing	Ford	196	32	Running	46
10	10	31	Parker Retzlaff (R)	Jordan Anderson Racing	Chevrolet	196	3	Running	29
11	13	48	Parker Kligerman	Big Machine Racing	Chevrolet	196	22	Running	27
12	2	16	Chandler Smith (R)	Kaulig Racing	Chevrolet	196	74	Running	40
13	12	27	Jeb Burton	Jordan Anderson Racing	Chevrolet	196	0	Running	24
14	26	25	Brett Moffitt	AM Racing	Ford	196	0	Running	24
15	16	7	Justin Allgaier	JR Motorsports	Chevrolet	196	0	Running	22
16	20	26	Kaz Grala	Sam Hunt Racing	Toyota	196	0	Running	21
17	19	2	Sheldon Creed	Richard Childress Racing	Chevrolet	195	0	Running	20
18	32	4	Kyle Weatherman	JD Motorsports	Chevrolet	195	0	Running	19
19	14	39	Ryan Sieg	RSS Racing	Ford	195	0	Running	18
20	35	6	Brennan Poole	JD Motorsports	Chevrolet	195	0	Running	17
21	17	38	Joe Graf Jr.	RSS Racing	Ford	195	0	Running	16
22	24	51	Jeremy Clements	Jeremy Clements Racing	Chevrolet	195	0	Running	15
23	28	78	Anthony Alfredo	B. J. McLeod Motorsports	Chevrolet	195	0	Running	14
24	15	9	Brandon Jones	JR Motorsports	Chevrolet	195	0	Running	13
25	9	29	Kyle Sieg	RSS Racing	Ford	195	0	Running	12
26	27	02	Blaine Perkins (R)	Our Motorsports	Chevrolet	194	0	Running	11
27	30	45	Jeffrey Earnhardt	Alpha Prime Racing	Chevrolet	194	0	Running	10
28	25	43	Ryan Ellis	Alpha Prime Racing	Chevrolet	194	0	Running	9
29	22	91	Chad Chastain (i)	DGM Racing	Chevrolet	194	0	Running	0
30	36	35	David Starr	Emerling-Gase Motorsports	Chevrolet	193	0	Running	7
31	37	53	Joey Gase	Emerling-Gase Motorsports	Ford	193	0	Running	6
32	31	08	Mason Massey	SS-Green Light Racing	Ford	186	0	Running	5
33	29	92	Josh Williams	DGM Racing	Chevrolet	111	0	Alternator	4
34	3	18	Sammy Smith (R)	Joe Gibbs Racing	Toyota	68	1	Accident	9
35	38	24	Connor Mosack (R)	Sam Hunt Racing	Toyota	61	0	DVP	2
36	8	77	Carson Hocevar (i)	Spire Motorsports	Chevrolet	53	0	Accident	0
37	4	19	Ty Gibbs (i)	Joe Gibbs Racing	Toyota	53	28	Accident	0
38	18	07	Stefan Parsons	SS-Green Light Racing	Chevrolet	0	0	Accident	1
Official race results

== Standings after the race ==
Drivers' Championship standings

	Pos	Driver	Points
	1	John Hunter Nemechek	585
	2	Austin Hill	576 (-9)
	3	Justin Allgaier	544 (–41)
	4	Cole Custer	534 (–51)
	5	Josh Berry	470 (–115)
	6	Chandler Smith	465 (–120)
	7	Sheldon Creed	444 (–141)
1	8	Sam Mayer	429 (–156)
1	9	Riley Herbst	416 (–169)
1	10	Daniel Hemric	399 (–186)
3	11	Sammy Smith	395 (–190)
	12	Parker Kligerman	371 (–214)
Official driver's standings

- Note: Only the first 12 positions are included for the driver standings.

Previous race: 2023 DoorDash 250	NASCAR Xfinity Series; 2023 season	Next race: 2023 The Loop 121
