= 2023 TSport 200 =

17th race of the 2023 NASCAR Craftsman Truck Series

Race details
- Race 17 of 23 of the 2023 NASCAR Craftsman Truck Series
- Date: August 11, 2023
- Location: Lucas Oil Indianapolis Raceway Park, Brownsburg, Indiana
- Course: Permanent racing facility
- Course length: 0.686 miles (1.104 km)
- Distance: 200 laps, 137 mi (220 km)
- Scheduled distance: 200 laps, 137 mi (220 km)
- Average speed: 75.075 mph (120.822 km/h)

Pole position
Driver	Christian Eckes	McAnally-Hilgemann Racing
- Time: 22.884

Most laps led
Driver	Ty Majeski	ThorSport Racing
- Laps: 179

Winner
No. 98	Ty Majeski	ThorSport Racing

Television in the United States
- Network: FS1
- Announcers: Jamie Little, Phil Parsons, and Michael Waltrip

Radio in the United States
- Radio: MRN

The 2023 TSport 200 was the 17th stock car race of the 2023 NASCAR Craftsman Truck Series, the first race of the Round of 10, and the 2nd iteration of the event. The race was held on Friday, August 11, 2023, in Brownsburg, Indiana at Lucas Oil Indianapolis Raceway Park, a 0.686 miles (1.104 km) permanent quad-oval shaped racetrack. The race took the scheduled 200 laps to complete. In a dominating performance, Ty Majeski, driving for ThorSport Racing, would win both stages and lead a race-high 179 laps, earning his third career NASCAR Craftsman Truck Series win, and his first of the season. He would also earn a spot in the next round of the playoffs. To fill out the podium, Christian Eckes, driving for McAnally-Hilgemann Racing, and Layne Riggs, driving for Spire Motorsports, would finish 2nd and 3rd, respectively.

== Background ==
Lucas Oil Indianapolis Raceway Park (formerly Indianapolis Raceway Park, O'Reilly Raceway Park at Indianapolis, and Lucas Oil Raceway) is an auto racing facility in Brownsburg, Indiana, about 10 miles (16 km) northwest of downtown Indianapolis. It includes a 0.686-mile (1.104 km) oval track, a 2.5-mile (4.0 km) road course (which has fallen into disrepair and is no longer used), and a 4,400-foot (1,300 m) drag strip which is among the premier drag racing venues in the world. The complex receives about 500,000 visitors annually.

=== Entry list ===
- (R) denotes rookie driver.
- (i) denotes driver who is ineligible for series driver points.
- (P) denotes playoff driver.
- (OP) denotes owner's playoff truck.

#	Driver	Team	Make
1	William Sawalich	Tricon Garage	Toyota
02	Matt Mills	Young's Motorsports	Chevrolet
2	Nick Sanchez (R) (P)	Rev Racing	Chevrolet
04	Landen Lewis	Roper Racing	Chevrolet
4	Chase Purdy	Kyle Busch Motorsports	Chevrolet
5	Dean Thompson	Tricon Garage	Toyota
7	Layne Riggs	Spire Motorsports	Chevrolet
9	Colby Howard	CR7 Motorsports	Chevrolet
11	Corey Heim (P)	Tricon Garage	Toyota
12	Spencer Boyd	Young's Motorsports	Chevrolet
13	Hailie Deegan	ThorSport Racing	Ford
15	Tanner Gray	Tricon Garage	Toyota
16	Tyler Ankrum	Hattori Racing Enterprises	Toyota
17	Taylor Gray (R)	Tricon Garage	Toyota
19	Christian Eckes (P)	McAnally-Hilgemann Racing	Chevrolet
20	Greg Van Alst	Young's Motorsports	Chevrolet
22	Logan Bearden	AM Racing	Ford
23	Grant Enfinger (P)	GMS Racing	Chevrolet
24	Rajah Caruth (R)	GMS Racing	Chevrolet
25	Matt DiBenedetto (P)	Rackley WAR	Chevrolet
30	Chris Hacker	On Point Motorsports	Toyota
32	Bret Holmes (R)	Bret Holmes Racing	Chevrolet
33	Josh Reaume	Reaume Brothers Racing	Ford
35	Jake Garcia (R)	McAnally-Hilgemann Racing	Chevrolet
38	Zane Smith (P)	Front Row Motorsports	Ford
41	Shane van Gisbergen	Niece Motorsports	Chevrolet
42	Carson Hocevar (P)	Niece Motorsports	Chevrolet
43	Daniel Dye (R)	GMS Racing	Chevrolet
44	Chad Chastain	Niece Motorsports	Chevrolet
45	Lawless Alan	Niece Motorsports	Chevrolet
46	Armani Williams	G2G Racing	Toyota
51	Jack Wood (OP)	Kyle Busch Motorsports	Chevrolet
52	Stewart Friesen	Halmar Friesen Racing	Toyota
56	Tyler Hill	Hill Motorsports	Toyota
61	Jake Drew	Hattori Racing Enterprises	Toyota
66	Conner Jones	ThorSport Racing	Ford
88	Matt Crafton (P)	ThorSport Racing	Ford
98	Ty Majeski (P)	ThorSport Racing	Ford
99	Ben Rhodes (P)	ThorSport Racing	Ford
Official entry list

== Practice ==
For practice, drivers will be separated into two groups, Group A and B. Both sessions will be 15 minutes long, and was held on Friday, August 11, at 3:30 PM EST. Corey Heim, driving for Tricon Garage, would set the fastest time between both groups, with a lap of 23.299, and an average speed of 105.996 mph (170.584 km/h).

Pos.	#	Driver	Team	Make	Time	Speed
1	11	Corey Heim (P)	Tricon Garage	Toyota	23.299	105.996
2	88	Matt Crafton (P)	ThorSport Racing	Ford	23.344	105.792
3	98	Ty Majeski (P)	ThorSport Racing	Ford	23.252	105.755
Full practice results

== Qualifying ==
Qualifying was held on Friday, August 11, at 4:05 PM EST. Since Lucas Oil Indianapolis Raceway Park is a short track, the qualifying system used is a single-car, two-lap system with only one round. In that round, whoever sets the fastest time will win the pole. Christian Eckes, driving for McAnally-Hilgemann Racing, would score the pole for the race, with a lap of 22.884, and an average speed of 107.918 mph (173.677 km/h).

Pos.	#	Driver	Team	Make	Time	Speed
1	19	Christian Eckes (P)	McAnally-Hilgemann Racing	Chevrolet	22.884	107.918
2	98	Ty Majeski (P)	ThorSport Racing	Ford	22.922	107.739
3	11	Corey Heim (P)	Tricon Garage	Toyota	22.963	107.547
4	24	Rajah Caruth (R)	GMS Racing	Chevrolet	22.967	107.528
5	42	Carson Hocevar (P)	Niece Motorsports	Chevrolet	22.968	107.524
6	23	Grant Enfinger (P)	GMS Racing	Chevrolet	22.969	107.519
7	35	Jake Garcia (R)	McAnally-Hilgemann Racing	Chevrolet	22.992	107.411
8	38	Zane Smith (P)	Front Row Motorsports	Ford	23.049	107.146
9	2	Nick Sanchez (R)	Rev Racing	Chevrolet	23.111	106.858
10	1	William Sawalich	Tricon Garage	Toyota	23.114	106.844
11	5	Dean Thompson	Tricon Garage	Toyota	23.149	106.683
12	7	Layne Riggs	Spire Motorsports	Chevrolet	23.166	106.605
13	88	Matt Crafton (P)	ThorSport Racing	Ford	23.181	106.536
14	52	Stewart Friesen	Halmar Friesen Racing	Toyota	23.202	106.439
15	43	Daniel Dye (R)	GMS Racing	Chevrolet	23.207	106.416
16	9	Colby Howard	CR7 Motorsports	Chevrolet	23.287	106.051
17	02	Matt Mills	Young's Motorsports	Chevrolet	23.288	106.046
18	66	Conner Jones	ThorSport Racing	Ford	23.321	105.896
19	15	Tanner Gray	Tricon Garage	Toyota	23.363	105.706
20	61	Jake Drew	Hattori Racing Enterprises	Toyota	23.371	105.669
21	99	Ben Rhodes (P)	ThorSport Racing	Ford	23.385	105.606
22	4	Chase Purdy	Kyle Busch Motorsports	Chevrolet	23.388	105.593
23	51	Jack Wood (OP)	Kyle Busch Motorsports	Chevrolet	23.393	105.570
24	25	Matt DiBenedetto (P)	Rackley WAR	Chevrolet	23.423	105.435
25	13	Hailie Deegan	ThorSport Racing	Ford	23.436	105.376
26	22	Logan Bearden	AM Racing	Ford	23.440	105.358
27	20	Greg Van Alst	Young's Motorsports	Chevrolet	23.491	105.130
28	41	Shane van Gisbergen	Niece Motorsports	Chevrolet	23.527	104.969
29	04	Landen Lewis	Roper Racing	Chevrolet	23.673	104.321
30	56	Tyler Hill	Hill Motorsports	Toyota	23.680	104.291
31	12	Spencer Boyd	Young's Motorsports	Chevrolet	23.733	104.058
Qualified by owner's points
32	32	Bret Holmes (R)	Bret Holmes Racing	Chevrolet	23.814	103.704
33	30	Chris Hacker	On Point Motorsports	Toyota	23.833	103.621
34	17	Taylor Gray (R)	Tricon Garage	Toyota	23.912	103.279
35	16	Tyler Ankrum	Hattori Racing Enterprises	Toyota	–	–
36	45	Lawless Alan	Niece Motorsports	Chevrolet	–	–
Failed to qualify
37	33	Josh Reaume	Reaume Brothers Racing	Ford	23.758	103.948
38	44	Chad Chastain	Niece Motorsports	Chevrolet	23.884	103.400
39	46	Armani Williams	G2G Racing	Toyota	24.511	100.755
Official qualifying results
Official starting lineup

== Race results ==
Stage 1 Laps: 60

Pos.	#	Driver	Team	Make	Pts
1	98	Ty Majeski (P)	ThorSport Racing	Ford	10
2	11	Corey Heim (P)	Tricon Garage	Toyota	9
3	19	Christian Eckes (P)	McAnally-Hilgemann Racing	Chevrolet	8
4	7	Layne Riggs	Spire Motorsports	Chevrolet	7
5	35	Jake Garcia (R)	McAnally-Hilgemann Racing	Chevrolet	6
6	42	Carson Hocevar (P)	Niece Motorsports	Chevrolet	5
7	23	Grant Enfinger (P)	GMS Racing	Chevrolet	4
8	24	Rajah Caruth (R)	GMS Racing	Chevrolet	3
9	15	Tanner Gray	Tricon Garage	Toyota	2
10	38	Zane Smith (P)	Front Row Motorsports	Ford	1

Stage 2 Laps: 60

Pos.	#	Driver	Team	Make	Pts
1	98	Ty Majeski (P)	ThorSport Racing	Ford	10
2	11	Corey Heim (P)	Tricon Garage	Toyota	9
3	23	Grant Enfinger (P)	GMS Racing	Chevrolet	8
4	19	Christian Eckes (P)	McAnally-Hilgemann Racing	Chevrolet	7
5	42	Carson Hocevar (P)	Niece Motorsports	Chevrolet	6
6	1	William Sawalich	Tricon Garage	Toyota	5
7	38	Zane Smith (P)	Front Row Motorsports	Ford	4
8	15	Tanner Gray	Tricon Garage	Toyota	3
9	7	Layne Riggs	Spire Motorsports	Chevrolet	2
10	2	Nick Sanchez (R) (P)	Rev Racing	Chevrolet	1

Stage 3 Laps: 80

Fin	St	#	Driver	Team	Make	Laps	Led	Status	Pts
1	2	98	Ty Majeski (P)	ThorSport Racing	Ford	200	179	Running	60
2	1	19	Christian Eckes (P)	McAnally-Hilgemann Racing	Chevrolet	200	3	Running	50
3	12	7	Layne Riggs	Spire Motorsports	Chevrolet	200	0	Running	43
4	5	42	Carson Hocevar (P)	Niece Motorsports	Chevrolet	200	0	Running	44
5	8	38	Zane Smith (P)	Front Row Motorsports	Ford	200	0	Running	37
6	10	1	William Sawalich	Tricon Garage	Toyota	200	0	Running	36
7	4	24	Rajah Caruth (R)	GMS Racing	Chevrolet	200	0	Running	33
8	3	11	Corey Heim (P)	Tricon Garage	Toyota	200	18	Running	47
9	13	88	Matt Crafton (P)	ThorSport Racing	Ford	200	0	Running	28
10	24	25	Matt DiBenedetto (P)	Rackley WAR	Chevrolet	200	0	Running	27
11	9	2	Nick Sanchez (R) (P)	Rev Racing	Chevrolet	200	0	Running	27
12	6	23	Grant Enfinger (P)	GMS Racing	Chevrolet	200	0	Running	37
13	7	35	Jake Garcia (R)	McAnally-Hilgemann Racing	Chevrolet	200	0	Running	30
14	22	4	Chase Purdy	Kyle Busch Motorsports	Chevrolet	200	0	Running	23
15	19	15	Tanner Gray	Tricon Garage	Toyota	200	0	Running	27
16	21	99	Ben Rhodes (P)	ThorSport Racing	Ford	200	0	Running	21
17	20	61	Jake Drew	Hattori Racing Enterprises	Toyota	200	0	Running	20
18	23	51	Jack Wood (OP)	Kyle Busch Motorsports	Chevrolet	200	0	Running	19
19	28	41	Shane van Gisbergen	Niece Motorsports	Chevrolet	199	0	Running	18
20	34	17	Taylor Gray (R)	Tricon Garage	Toyota	199	0	Running	17
21	26	22	Logan Bearden	AM Racing	Ford	199	0	Running	16
22	15	43	Daniel Dye (R)	GMS Racing	Chevrolet	199	0	Running	15
23	17	02	Matt Mills	Young's Motorsports	Chevrolet	198	0	Running	14
24	36	45	Lawless Alan	Niece Motorsports	Chevrolet	198	0	Running	13
25	32	32	Bret Holmes (R)	Bret Holmes Racing	Chevrolet	197	0	Running	12
26	30	56	Tyler Hill	Hill Motorsports	Toyota	197	0	Running	11
27	18	66	Conner Jones	ThorSport Racing	Ford	196	0	Running	10
28	29	04	Landen Lewis	Roper Racing	Chevrolet	196	0	Running	9
29	33	30	Chris Hacker	On Point Motorsports	Toyota	195	0	Running	8
30	14	52	Stewart Friesen	Halmar Friesen Racing	Toyota	183	0	Running	7
31	25	13	Hailie Deegan	ThorSport Racing	Ford	140	0	Accident	6
32	11	5	Dean Thompson	Tricon Garage	Toyota	130	0	Accident	5
33	31	12	Spencer Boyd	Young's Motorsports	Chevrolet	128	0	Accident	4
34	35	16	Tyler Ankrum	Hattori Racing Enterprises	Toyota	127	0	Electrical	3
35	16	9	Colby Howard	CR7 Motorsports	Chevrolet	79	0	Suspension	2
36	27	20	Greg Van Alst	Young's Motorsports	Chevrolet	14	0	Accident	1
Official race results

== Standings after the race ==
Drivers' Championship standings

	Pos	Driver	Points
	1	Corey Heim	2,077
4	2	Ty Majeski	2,074 (-3)
1	3	Christian Eckes	2,069 (-8)
1	4	Carson Hocevar	2,065 (-12)
3	5	Zane Smith	2,059 (-18)
1	6	Grant Enfinger	2,054 (-23)
	7	Ben Rhodes	2,034 (-43)
	8	Nick Sanchez	2,032 (-45)
1	9	Matt Crafton	2,030 (-47)
1	10	Matt DiBenedetto	2,029 (-48)
Official driver's standings

- Note: Only the first 10 positions are included for the driver standings.

Previous race: 2023 Worldwide Express 250	NASCAR Craftsman Truck Series; 2023 season	Next race: 2023 Clean Harbors 175
