= 2022 Worldwide Express 250 =

18th race of the 2022 NASCAR Camping World Truck Series

2022 Worldwide Express 250 for Carrier Appreciation
Race details
- Race 18 of 23 of the 2022 NASCAR Camping World Truck Series
- Date: August 13, 2022
- Official name: 14th Annual Worldwide Express 250 for Carrier Appreciation
- Location: Richmond Raceway, Richmond, Virginia
- Course: Permanent racing facility
- Course length: 0.75 miles (1.21 km)
- Distance: 250 laps, 187.50 mi (301.8 km)
- Average speed: 96.209 mph (154.833 km/h)

Pole position
Driver	Ty Majeski	ThorSport Racing
- Time: 22.579

Most laps led
Driver	Chandler Smith	Kyle Busch Motorsports
- Laps: 176

Winner
No. 18	Chandler Smith	Kyle Busch Motorsports

Television in the United States
- Network: Fox Sports 1
- Announcers: Vince Welch, Phil Parsons, and Michael Waltrip

Radio in the United States
- Radio: Motor Racing Network

The 2022 Worldwide Express 250 for Carrier Appreciation was the 18th stock car race of the 2022 NASCAR Camping World Truck Series, the second race of the Round of 10, and the 14th iteration of the event. The race was held on Saturday, August 13, 2022, in Richmond, Virginia at Richmond Raceway, a 0.75 miles (1.21 km) permanent D-shaped racetrack. The race was contested over 250 laps. Chandler Smith, driving for Kyle Busch Motorsports, dominated the majority of the race, leading 176 laps for his fifth career NASCAR Camping World Truck Series win, along with his third of the season. He would also earn a spot in the next round of the playoffs. To fill out the podium, John Hunter Nemechek, driving for Kyle Busch Motorsports, and Ty Majeski, driving for ThorSport Racing, would finish 2nd and 3rd, respectively.

== Background ==
Richmond Raceway (RR) is a 0.75 miles (1.21 km), D-shaped, asphalt race track located just outside Richmond, Virginia. It hosts the top three NASCAR series. Known as "America's premier short track", it has formerly hosted events such as the International Race of Champions, Denny Hamlin Short Track Showdown, and the USAC sprint car series. Due to Richmond Raceway's unique "D" shape which allows drivers to reach high speeds, its racing grooves, and proclivity for contact Richmond is a favorite among NASCAR drivers and fans.

=== Entry list ===
- (R) denotes rookie driver.
- (i) denotes driver who are ineligible for series driver points.

#	Driver	Team	Make
1	Hailie Deegan	David Gilliland Racing	Ford
02	Kaz Grala	Young's Motorsports	Chevrolet
4	John Hunter Nemechek	Kyle Busch Motorsports	Toyota
5	Tyler Hill	Hill Motorsports	Toyota
6	Norm Benning	Norm Benning Racing	Chevrolet
7	Rajah Caruth	Spire Motorsports	Chevrolet
9	Blaine Perkins (R)	CR7 Motorsports	Chevrolet
12	Spencer Boyd	Young's Motorsports	Chevrolet
14	Trey Hutchens	Trey Hutchens Racing	Chevrolet
15	Tanner Gray	David Gilliland Racing	Ford
16	Tyler Ankrum	Hattori Racing Enterprises	Toyota
17	Taylor Gray	David Gilliland Racing	Ford
18	Chandler Smith	Kyle Busch Motorsports	Toyota
19	Derek Kraus	McAnally–Hilgemann Racing	Chevrolet
20	Joey Gase (i)	Young's Motorsports	Chevrolet
22	Austin Wayne Self	AM Racing	Chevrolet
23	Grant Enfinger	GMS Racing	Chevrolet
24	Jack Wood (R)	GMS Racing	Chevrolet
25	Matt DiBenedetto	Rackley W.A.R.	Chevrolet
30	Kaden Honeycutt	On Point Motorsports	Toyota
32	Bret Holmes	Bret Holmes Racing	Chevrolet
33	Nick Leitz	Reaume Brothers Racing	Chevrolet
35	Jake Garcia	McAnally–Hilgemann Racing	Chevrolet
38	Zane Smith	Front Row Motorsports	Ford
40	Dean Thompson (R)	Niece Motorsports	Chevrolet
42	Carson Hocevar	Niece Motorsports	Chevrolet
43	Josh Reaume* (Note: Driver changed to Mason Maggio for the race after Maggio failed to qualify.)	Reaume Brothers Racing	Toyota
44	Chad Chastain	Niece Motorsports	Chevrolet
45	Lawless Alan (R)	Niece Motorsports	Chevrolet
46	Brennan Poole	G2G Racing	Toyota
51	Corey Heim (R)	Kyle Busch Motorsports	Toyota
52	Stewart Friesen	Halmar Friesen Racing	Toyota
56	Timmy Hill	Hill Motorsports	Toyota
61	Chase Purdy	Hattori Racing Enterprises	Toyota
62	Layne Riggs	Halmar Friesen Racing	Toyota
66	Ty Majeski	ThorSport Racing	Toyota
88	Matt Crafton	ThorSport Racing	Toyota
90	Justin Carroll	TC Motorsports	Toyota
91	Colby Howard	McAnally–Hilgemann Racing	Chevrolet
96	Mason Maggio	Peck Motorsports	Chevrolet
98	Christian Eckes	ThorSport Racing	Toyota
99	Ben Rhodes	ThorSport Racing	Toyota
Official entry list

== Practice ==
The only 30-minute practice session was held on Saturday, August 13, at 3:30 PM EST. Ty Majeski, driving for ThorSport Racing, was the fastest in the session, with a lap of 22.681, and an average speed of 119.042 mph (191.580 km/h).

Pos.	#	Driver	Team	Make	Time	Speed
1	66	Ty Majeski	ThorSport Racing	Toyota	22.681	119.042
2	18	Chandler Smith	Kyle Busch Motorsports	Toyota	22.794	118.452
3	42	Carson Hocevar	Niece Motorsports	Chevrolet	22.813	118.354
Full practice results

== Qualifying ==
Qualifying was held on Friday, July 29, at 5:05 PM EST. Since Richmond Raceway is a short track, the qualifying system used is a single-car, two-lap system with only one round. Whoever sets the fastest time in the round wins the pole. Ty Majeski, driving for ThorSport Racing, scored the pole for the race, with a lap of 22.579, and an average speed of 119.580 mph (192.445 km/h).

Pos.	#	Driver	Team	Make	Time	Speed
1	66	Ty Majeski	ThorSport Racing	Toyota	22.579	119.580
2	18	Chandler Smith	Kyle Busch Motorsports	Toyota	22.598	119.480
3	52	Stewart Friesen	Halmar Friesen Racing	Toyota	22.687	119.011
4	62	Layne Riggs	Halmar Friesen Racing	Toyota	22.702	118.932
5	23	Grant Enfinger	GMS Racing	Chevrolet	22.742	118.723
6	38	Zane Smith	Front Row Motorsports	Ford	22.790	118.473
7	4	John Hunter Nemechek	Kyle Busch Motorsports	Toyota	22.799	118.426
8	61	Chase Purdy	Hattori Racing Enterprises	Toyota	22.800	118.421
9	98	Christian Eckes	ThorSport Racing	Toyota	22.811	118.364
10	25	Matt DiBenedetto	Rackley W.A.R.	Chevrolet	22.820	118.317
11	16	Tyler Ankrum	Hattori Racing Enterprises	Toyota	22.848	118.172
12	42	Carson Hocevar	Niece Motorsports	Chevrolet	22.852	118.152
13	22	Austin Wayne Self	AM Racing	Chevrolet	22.863	118.095
14	99	Ben Rhodes	ThorSport Racing	Toyota	22.886	117.976
15	88	Matt Crafton	ThorSport Racing	Toyota	22.889	117.961
16	51	Corey Heim (R)	Kyle Busch Motorsports	Toyota	22.925	117.775
17	35	Jake Garcia	McAnally–Hilgemann Racing	Chevrolet	22.968	117.555
18	19	Derek Kraus	McAnally–Hilgemann Racing	Chevrolet	22.970	117.545
19	15	Tanner Gray	David Gilliland Racing	Ford	22.997	117.407
20	1	Hailie Deegan	David Gilliland Racing	Ford	23.023	117.274
21	30	Kaden Honeycutt	On Point Motorsports	Toyota	23.075	117.010
22	91	Colby Howard	McAnally–Hilgemann Racing	Chevrolet	23.081	116.979
23	9	Blaine Perkins (R)	CR7 Motorsports	Chevrolet	23.107	116.848
24	17	Taylor Gray	David Gilliland Racing	Ford	23.137	116.696
25	24	Jack Wood (R)	GMS Racing	Chevrolet	23.174	116.510
26	02	Kaz Grala	Young's Motorsports	Chevrolet	23.217	116.294
27	45	Lawless Alan (R)	Niece Motorsports	Chevrolet	23.246	116.149
28	7	Rajah Caruth	Spire Motorsports	Chevrolet	23.269	116.034
29	40	Dean Thompson (R)	Niece Motorsports	Chevrolet	23.320	115.780
30	20	Joey Gase (i)	Young's Motorsports	Chevrolet	23.378	115.493
31	32	Bret Holmes	Bret Holmes Racing	Chevrolet	23.440	115.188
Qualified by owner's points
32	12	Spencer Boyd	Young's Motorsports	Chevrolet	23.558	114.611
33	44	Chad Chastain	Niece Motorsports	Chevrolet	23.579	114.509
34	33	Nick Leitz	Reaume Brothers Racing	Chevrolet	23.825	113.326
35	43	Josh Reaume	Reaume Brothers Racing	Toyota	24.023	112.392
36	56	Timmy Hill	Hill Motorsports	Toyota	24.150	111.801
Failed to qualify
37	5	Tyler Hill	Hill Motorsports	Toyota	23.551	114.645
38	46	Brennan Poole (i)	G2G Racing	Toyota	23.702	113.914
39	90	Justin Carroll	TC Motorsports	Toyota	23.812	113.388
40	14	Trey Hutchens	Trey Hutchens Racing	Chevrolet	23.898	112.980
41	96	Mason Maggio	Peck Motorsports	Chevrolet	24.256	111.313
42	6	Norm Benning	Norm Benning Racing	Chevrolet	25.490	105.924
Official qualifying results
Official starting lineup

== Race results ==
Stage 1 Laps: 70

Pos.	#	Driver	Team	Make	Pts
1	66	Ty Majeski	ThorSport Racing	Toyota	10
2	4	John Hunter Nemechek	Kyle Busch Motorsports	Toyota	9
3	18	Chandler Smith	Kyle Busch Motorsports	Toyota	8
4	52	Stewart Friesen	Halmar Friesen Racing	Toyota	7
5	23	Grant Enfinger	GMS Racing	Chevrolet	6
6	16	Tyler Ankrum	Hattori Racing Enterprises	Toyota	5
7	88	Matt Crafton	ThorSport Racing	Toyota	4
8	62	Layne Riggs	Halmar Friesen Racing	Toyota	3
9	98	Christian Eckes	ThorSport Racing	Toyota	2
10	51	Corey Heim (R)	Kyle Busch Motorsports	Toyota	1

Stage 2 Laps: 70

Pos.	#	Driver	Team	Make	Pts
1	18	Chandler Smith	Kyle Busch Motorsports	Toyota	10
2	4	John Hunter Nemechek	Kyle Busch Motorsports	Toyota	9
3	23	Grant Enfinger	GMS Racing	Chevrolet	8
4	66	Ty Majeski	ThorSport Racing	Toyota	7
5	17	Taylor Gray	David Gilliland Racing	Ford	6
6	51	Corey Heim (R)	Kyle Busch Motorsports	Toyota	5
7	52	Stewart Friesen	Halmar Friesen Racing	Toyota	4
8	88	Matt Crafton	ThorSport Racing	Toyota	3
9	38	Zane Smith	Front Row Motorsports	Ford	2
10	16	Tyler Ankrum	Hattori Racing Enterprises	Toyota	1

Stage 3 Laps: 110

Fin.	St	#	Driver	Team	Make	Laps	Led	Status	Pts
1	2	18	Chandler Smith	Kyle Busch Motorsports	Toyota	250	176	Running	58
2	7	4	John Hunter Nemechek	Kyle Busch Motorsports	Toyota	250	1	Running	53
3	1	66	Ty Majeski	ThorSport Racing	Toyota	250	73	Running	51
4	5	23	Grant Enfinger	GMS Racing	Chevrolet	250	0	Running	47
5	16	51	Corey Heim (R)	Kyle Busch Motorsports	Toyota	250	0	Running	38
6	24	17	Taylor Gray	David Gilliland Racing	Ford	250	0	Running	37
7	15	88	Matt Crafton	ThorSport Racing	Toyota	250	0	Running	37
8	9	98	Christian Eckes	ThorSport Racing	Toyota	250	0	Running	31
9	6	38	Zane Smith	Front Row Motorsports	Ford	250	0	Running	30
10	12	42	Carson Hocevar	Niece Motorsports	Chevrolet	250	0	Running	27
11	3	52	Stewart Friesen	Halmar Friesen Racing	Toyota	250	0	Running	37
12	18	19	Derek Kraus	McAnally–Hilgemann Racing	Chevrolet	250	0	Running	25
13	11	16	Tyler Ankrum	Hattori Racing Enterprises	Toyota	250	0	Running	30
14	8	61	Chase Purdy	Hattori Racing Enterprises	Toyota	250	0	Running	23
15	31	32	Bret Holmes	Bret Holmes Racing	Chevrolet	249	0	Running	22
16	19	15	Tanner Gray	David Gilliland Racing	Ford	248	0	Running	21
17	10	25	Matt DiBenedetto	Rackey WAR	Chevrolet	248	0	Running	20
18	14	99	Ben Rhodes	ThorSport Racing	Toyota	248	0	Running	19
19	4	62	Layne Riggs	Halmar Friesen Racing	Toyota	248	0	Running	21
20	17	35	Jake Garcia	McAnally–Hilgemann Racing	Chevrolet	248	0	Running	17
21	21	30	Kaden Honeycutt	On Point Motorsports	Toyota	247	0	Running	16
22	26	02	Kaz Grala	Young's Motorsports	Chevrolet	247	0	Running	15
23	25	24	Jack Wood (R)	GMS Racing	Chevrolet	247	0	Running	14
24	27	45	Lawless Alan (R)	Niece Motorsports	Chevrolet	247	0	Running	13
25	28	7	Rajah Caruth	Spire Motorsports	Chevrolet	247	0	Running	12
26	20	1	Hailie Deegan	David Gilliland Racing	Ford	247	0	Running	11
27	13	22	Austin Wayne Self	AM Racing	Chevrolet	247	0	Running	10
28	22	91	Colby Howard	McAnally–Hilgemann Racing	Chevrolet	246	0	Running	9
29	30	20	Joey Gase (i)	Young's Motorsports	Chevrolet	246	0	Running	0
30	33	44	Chad Chastain	Niece Motorsports	Chevrolet	246	0	Running	7
31	36	56	Timmy Hill	Hill Motorsports	Toyota	245	0	Running	6
32	32	12	Spencer Boyd	Young's Motorsports	Chevrolet	244	0	Running	5
33	35	43	Mason Maggio	Reaume Brothers Racing	Toyota	242	0	Running	4
34	23	9	Blaine Perkins (R)	CR7 Motorsports	Chevrolet	224	0	Running	3
35	29	40	Dean Thompson (R)	Niece Motorsports	Chevrolet	223	0	Running	2
36	34	33	Nick Leitz	Reaume Brothers Racing	Chevrolet	209	0	Accident	1
Official race results

== Standings after the race ==
Drivers' Championship standings

	Pos	Driver	Points
5	1	Chandler Smith	2,111
1	2	Zane Smith	2,109 (-2)
2	3	John Hunter Nemechek	2,106 (-5)
1	4	Grant Enfinger	2,104 (-7)
2	5	Ty Majeski	2,099 (-12)
2	6	Stewart Friesen	2,094 (-17)
5	7	Ben Rhodes	2,084 (-27)
1	8	Matt Crafton	2,066 (-45)
1	9	Carson Hocevar	2,063 (-48)
	10	Christian Eckes	2,060 (-51)
Official driver's standings

- Note: Only the first 10 positions are included for the driver standings.

Previous race: 2022 TSport 200	NASCAR Camping World Truck Series; 2022 season	Next race: 2022 Kansas Lottery 200
