= 2021 United Rentals 176 at The Glen =

Race details
- Race 15 of 22 in the 2021 NASCAR Camping World Truck Series
- Date: August 7, 2021
- Location: Watkins Glen, New York, Watkins Glen International
- Course: Permanent racing facility
- Course length: 2.45 miles (3.943 km)
- Distance: 61 laps, 149.45 mi (240.516 km)
- Scheduled distance: 72 laps, 176.400 mi (283.888 km)
- Average speed: 87.298 miles per hour (140.493 km/h)

Pole position
Driver	Austin Hill	Hattori Racing Enterprises
- Grid positions set by competition-based formula

Most laps led
Driver	Austin Hill	Hattori Racing Enterprises
- Laps: 35

Winner
No. 16	Austin Hill	Hattori Racing Enterprises

Television in the United States
- Network: Fox Sports 1
- Announcers: Vince Welch, Michael Waltrip, Joey Logano

Radio in the United States
- Radio: Motor Racing Network

The 2021 United Rentals 176 at The Glen was the 15th stock car race of the 2021 NASCAR Camping World Truck Series season and the 6th iteration of the event, after a 20 year absence of Truck racing at Watkins Glen International. The race was held on Saturday, August 7, 2021 in Watkins Glen, New York at Watkins Glen International. The race was shortened to 61 laps from 72 laps due to lightning near the track during the race. Austin Hill of Hattori Racing Enterprises would win the lightning-shortened event, while John Hunter Nemechek of Kyle Busch Motorsports and Sheldon Creed of GMS Racing took second and third, respectively.

== Background ==
Watkins Glen International (nicknamed "The Glen") is an automobile race track located in Watkins Glen, New York at the southern tip of Seneca Lake. It was long known around the world as the home of the Formula One United States Grand Prix, which it hosted for twenty consecutive years (1961–1980), but the site has been home to road racing of nearly every class, including the World Sportscar Championship, Trans-Am, Can–Am, NASCAR Cup Series, the IMSA and the IndyCar Series.

Initially, public roads in the village were used for the race course. In 1956 a permanent circuit for the race was built. In 1968 the race was extended to six hours, becoming the 6 Hours of Watkins Glen. The circuit's current layout has more or less been the same since 1971, although a chicane was installed at the uphill Esses in 1975 to slow cars through these corners, where there was a fatality during practice at the 1973 United States Grand Prix. The chicane was removed in 1985, but another chicane called the "Inner Loop" was installed in 1992 after J. D. McDuffie's fatal accident during the previous year's NASCAR Winston Cup event.

The circuit is known as the Mecca of North American road racing and is a very popular venue among fans and drivers. The facility is currently owned by International Speedway Corporation.

=== Entry list ===
#	Driver	Team	Make
1	Hailie Deegan	David Gilliland Racing	Ford
2	Sheldon Creed	GMS Racing	Chevrolet
02	Kaz Grala	Young's Motorsports	Chevrolet
3	Bobby Reuse	Jordan Anderson Racing	Chevrolet
4	John Hunter Nemechek	Kyle Busch Motorsports	Toyota
6	Norm Benning	Norm Benning Racing	Chevrolet
9	Grant Enfinger	CR7 Motorsports	Chevrolet
10	Jennifer Jo Cobb	Jennifer Jo Cobb Racing	Ford
12	Tate Fogleman	Young's Motorsports	Chevrolet
13	Johnny Sauter	ThorSport Racing	Toyota
15	Tanner Gray	David Gilliland Racing	Ford
16	Austin Hill	Hattori Racing Enterprises	Toyota
17	Taylor Gray	David Gilliland Racing	Ford
18	Chandler Smith	Kyle Busch Motorsports	Toyota
19	Derek Kraus	McAnally–Hilgemann Racing	Toyota
20	Spencer Boyd	Young's Motorsports	Chevrolet
21	Zane Smith	GMS Racing	Chevrolet
22	Austin Wayne Self	AM Racing	Chevrolet
23	A. J. Allmendinger	GMS Racing	Chevrolet
24	Jack Wood	GMS Racing	Chevrolet
25	Josh Berry	Rackley W.A.R.	Chevrolet
26	Tyler Ankrum	GMS Racing	Chevrolet
30	Danny Bohn	On Point Motorsports	Toyota
32	Sam Mayer	Bret Holmes Racing	Chevrolet
33	Josh Reaume	Reaume Brothers Racing	Toyota
34	Lawless Alan	Reaume Brothers Racing	Toyota
38	Todd Gilliland	Front Row Motorsports	Ford
40	Ryan Truex	Niece Motorsports	Chevrolet
41	Will Rodgers	Cram Racing Enterprises	Chevrolet
42	Carson Hocevar	Niece Motorsports	Chevrolet
45	Chad Chastain	Niece Motorsports	Chevrolet
49	Roger Reuse	CMI Motorsports	Ford
51	Corey Heim	Kyle Busch Motorsports	Toyota
52	Stewart Friesen	Halmar Friesen Racing	Toyota
56	Timmy Hill	Hill Motorsports	Chevrolet
66	Paul Menard	ThorSport Racing	Toyota
72	Samuel Lecomte	CMI Motorsports	Ford
75	Parker Kligerman	Henderson Motorsports	Chevrolet
88	Matt Crafton	ThorSport Racing	Toyota
98	Christian Eckes	ThorSport Racing	Toyota
99	Ben Rhodes	ThorSport Racing	Toyota
Official entry list

== Starting lineup ==
The grid was set by a competition-based formula based on the previous race. As a result, Austin Hill of Hattori Racing Enterprises would win the pole.

Pos.	#	Driver	Team	Make
1	16	Austin Hill	Hattori Racing Enterprises	Toyota
2	38	Todd Gilliland	Front Row Motorsports	Ford
3	18	Chandler Smith	Kyle Busch Motorsports	Toyota
4	88	Matt Crafton	ThorSport Racing	Toyota
5	99	Ben Rhodes	ThorSport Racing	Toyota
6	4	John Hunter Nemechek	Kyle Busch Motorsports	Toyota
7	19	Derek Kraus	McAnally–Hilgemann Racing	Toyota
8	21	Zane Smith	GMS Racing	Chevrolet
9	42	Carson Hocevar	Niece Motorsports	Chevrolet
10	26	Tyler Ankrum	GMS Racing	Chevrolet
11	30	Danny Bohn	On Point Motorsports	Toyota
12	40	Ryan Truex	Niece Motorsports	Chevrolet
13	12	Tate Fogleman	Young's Motorsports	Chevrolet
14	13	Johnny Sauter	ThorSport Racing	Toyota
15	98	Christian Eckes	ThorSport Racing	Toyota
16	51	Corey Heim	Kyle Busch Motorsports	Toyota
17	52	Stewart Friesen	Halmar Friesen Racing	Toyota
18	1	Hailie Deegan	David Gilliland Racing	Ford
19	2	Sheldon Creed	GMS Racing	Chevrolet
20	22	Austin Wayne Self	AM Racing	Chevrolet
21	25	Josh Berry	Rackley W.A.R.	Chevrolet
22	15	Tanner Gray	David Gilliland Racing	Ford
23	02	Kaz Grala	Young's Motorsports	Chevrolet
24	34	Lawless Alan	Reaume Brothers Racing	Toyota
25	23	A. J. Allmendinger	GMS Racing	Chevrolet
26	6	Norm Benning	Norm Benning Racing	Chevrolet
27	24	Jack Wood	GMS Racing	Chevrolet
28	10	Jennifer Jo Cobb	Jennifer Jo Cobb Racing	Ford
29	41	Will Rodgers	Cram Racing Enterprises	Chevrolet
30	9	Grant Enfinger	CR7 Motorsports	Chevrolet
31	45	Chad Chastain	Niece Motorsports	Chevrolet
32	17	Taylor Gray	David Gilliland Racing	Ford
33	33	Josh Reaume	Reaume Brothers Racing	Toyota
34	20	Spencer Boyd	Young's Motorsports	Chevrolet
35	3	Bobby Reuse	Jordan Anderson Racing	Chevrolet
36	56	Timmy Hill	Hill Motorsports	Chevrolet
37	49	Roger Reuse	CMI Motorsports	Ford
38	75	Parker Kligerman	Henderson Motorsports	Chevrolet
39	66	Paul Menard	ThorSport Racing	Toyota
40	32	Sam Mayer	Bret Holmes Racing	Chevrolet
Failed to qualify
41	72	Samuel Lecomte	CMI Motorsports	Ford
Official starting lineup

== Race results ==
Stage 1 Laps:

Fin	#	Driver	Team	Make	Pts
1	38	Todd Gilliland	Front Row Motorsports	Ford	10
2	2	Sheldon Creed	GMS Racing	Chevrolet	9
3	19	Derek Kraus	McAnally–Hilgemann Racing	Toyota	8
4	25	Josh Berry	Rackley W.A.R.	Chevrolet	0
5	22	Austin Wayne Self	AM Racing	Chevrolet	6
6	23	A. J. Allmendinger	GMS Racing	Chevrolet	0
7	66	Paul Menard	ThorSport Racing	Toyota	4
8	52	Stewart Friesen	Halmar Friesen Racing	Toyota	3
9	99	Ben Rhodes	ThorSport Racing	Toyota	2
10	40	Ryan Truex	Niece Motorsports	Chevrolet	1

Stage 2 Laps:

Fin	#	Driver	Team	Make	Pts
1	16	Austin Hill	Hattori Racing Enterprises	Toyota	10
2	4	John Hunter Nemechek	Kyle Busch Motorsports	Toyota	9
3	23	A. J. Allmendinger	GMS Racing	Chevrolet	0
4	21	Zane Smith	GMS Racing	Chevrolet	7
5	2	Sheldon Creed	GMS Racing	Chevrolet	6
6	26	Tyler Ankrum	GMS Racing	Chevrolet	5
7	42	Carson Hocevar	Niece Motorsports	Chevrolet	4
8	38	Todd Gilliland	Front Row Motorsports	Ford	3
9	99	Ben Rhodes	ThorSport Racing	Toyota	2
10	32	Sam Mayer	Bret Holmes Racing	Chevrolet	0

Stage 3 Laps:

Fin	St	#	Driver	Team	Make	Laps	Led	Status	Pts
1	1	16	Austin Hill	Hattori Racing Enterprises	Toyota	61	35	running	50
2	6	4	John Hunter Nemechek	Kyle Busch Motorsports	Toyota	61	2	running	44
3	19	2	Sheldon Creed	GMS Racing	Chevrolet	61	0	running	49
4	2	38	Todd Gilliland	Front Row Motorsports	Ford	61	18	running	46
5	38	75	Parker Kligerman	Henderson Motorsports	Chevrolet	61	0	running	32
6	8	21	Zane Smith	GMS Racing	Chevrolet	61	4	running	38
7	10	26	Tyler Ankrum	GMS Racing	Chevrolet	61	0	running	35
8	39	66	Paul Menard	ThorSport Racing	Toyota	61	0	running	33
9	40	32	Sam Mayer	Bret Holmes Racing	Chevrolet	61	0	running	0
10	9	42	Carson Hocevar	Niece Motorsports	Chevrolet	61	1	running	31
11	21	25	Josh Berry	Rackley W.A.R.	Chevrolet	61	0	running	0
12	23	02	Kaz Grala	Young's Motorsports	Chevrolet	61	0	running	25
13	15	98	Christian Eckes	ThorSport Racing	Toyota	61	0	running	24
14	22	15	Tanner Gray	David Gilliland Racing	Ford	61	0	running	23
15	5	99	Ben Rhodes	ThorSport Racing	Toyota	61	0	running	26
16	20	22	Austin Wayne Self	AM Racing	Chevrolet	61	0	running	27
17	12	40	Ryan Truex	Niece Motorsports	Chevrolet	61	0	running	21
18	16	51	Corey Heim	Kyle Busch Motorsports	Toyota	61	0	running	19
19	18	1	Hailie Deegan	David Gilliland Racing	Ford	61	0	running	18
20	17	52	Stewart Friesen	Halmar Friesen Racing	Toyota	61	0	running	20
21	7	19	Derek Kraus	McAnally–Hilgemann Racing	Toyota	61	0	running	24
22	4	88	Matt Crafton	ThorSport Racing	Toyota	61	0	running	15
23	14	13	Johnny Sauter	ThorSport Racing	Toyota	61	0	running	14
24	36	56	Timmy Hill	Hill Motorsports	Chevrolet	61	0	running	13
25	27	24	Jack Wood	GMS Racing	Chevrolet	61	1	running	12
26	13	12	Tate Fogleman	Young's Motorsports	Chevrolet	61	0	running	11
27	25	23	A. J. Allmendinger	GMS Racing	Chevrolet	61	0	running	0
28	11	30	Danny Bohn	On Point Motorsports	Toyota	61	0	running	9
29	35	3	Bobby Reuse	Jordan Anderson Racing	Chevrolet	61	0	running	8
30	37	49	Roger Reuse	CMI Motorsports	Ford	60	0	running	7
31	33	33	Josh Reaume	Reaume Brothers Racing	Toyota	60	0	running	6
32	24	34	Lawless Alan	Reaume Brothers Racing	Toyota	60	0	running	5
33	34	20	Spencer Boyd	Young's Motorsports	Chevrolet	59	0	running	4
34	31	45	Chad Chastain	Niece Motorsports	Chevrolet	58	0	running	3
35	32	17	Taylor Gray	David Gilliland Racing	Ford	53	0	running	2
36	28	10	Jennifer Jo Cobb	Jennifer Jo Cobb Racing	Ford	45	0	running	1
37	26	6	Norm Benning	Norm Benning Racing	Chevrolet	40	0	too slow	1
38	30	9	Grant Enfinger	CR7 Motorsports	Chevrolet	8	0	transmission	1
39	29	41	Will Rodgers	Cram Racing Enterprises	Chevrolet	6	0	transmission	0
40	3	18	Chandler Smith	Kyle Busch Motorsports	Toyota	61	0	running/DQ	1
Official results

Previous race: 2021 Corn Belt 150	NASCAR Camping World Truck Series; 2021 season	Next race: 2021 Toyota 200
