= 2022 TSport 200 =

17th race of the 2022 NASCAR Camping World Truck Series

Race details
- Race 17 of 23 of the 2022 NASCAR Camping World Truck Series
- Date: July 29, 2022
- Official name: 18th Annual TSport 200
- Location: Lucas Oil Indianapolis Raceway Park, Brownsburg, Indiana
- Course: Permanent racing facility
- Course length: 0.686 miles (1.104 km)
- Distance: 207 laps, 142.002 mi (228.530 km)
- Scheduled distance: 200 laps, 137.2 mi (220.801 km)
- Average speed: 69.961 mph (112.591 km/h)

Pole position
| Driver | John Hunter Nemechek | Kyle Busch Motorsports |
- Time: 22.211

Most laps led
| Driver | John Hunter Nemechek | Kyle Busch Motorsports |
- Laps: 75

Winner
| No. 23 | Grant Enfinger | GMS Racing |

Television in the United States
- Network: Fox Sports 1
- Announcers: Vince Welch, Phil Parsons, Michael Waltrip

Radio in the United States
- Radio: Motor Racing Network

The 2022 TSport 200 was the 17th stock car race of the 2022 NASCAR Camping World Truck Series, the first race of the Round of 10, and the 18th iteration of the event. The race was held on Friday, July 29, 2022, in Brownsburg, Indiana at Lucas Oil Indianapolis Raceway Park, a 0.686 miles (1.104 km) permanent oval-shaped racetrack. The race was increased from 200 to 207 laps, due to a NASCAR overtime finish. In the final laps of the race, Grant Enfinger, driving for GMS Racing, took home the victory, after holding off the rest of the field with 2 laps to go. This was Enfinger's 7th career NASCAR Camping World Truck Series win, and his first win since 2020. He would also earn a spot in the next round of the playoffs. John Hunter Nemechek and Ty Majeski mainly dominated the race, leading 75 and 71 laps, respectively. To fill out the podium, Ben Rhodes, driving for ThorSport Racing, and Zane Smith, driving for Front Row Motorsports, would finish 2nd and 3rd, respectively.

This was the debut race for the NASCAR Advance Auto Parts Weekly Series driver, Layne Riggs. Riggs would go on to finish 7th in his first ever start.

== Background ==
Lucas Oil Indianapolis Raceway Park (formerly Indianapolis Raceway Park, O'Reilly Raceway Park at Indianapolis, and Lucas Oil Raceway) is an auto racing facility in Brownsburg, Indiana, United States, about 10 miles (16 km) west of Downtown Indianapolis. It includes a 0.686-mile (1.104 km) oval track, a 2.5-mile (4.0 km) road course (which has fallen into disrepair and is no longer used), and a 4,400-foot (1,300 m) drag strip which is among the premier drag racing venues in the world. The complex receives about 500,000 visitors annually.

=== Entry list ===
- (R) denotes rookie driver.

| # | Driver | Team | Make |
|---|---|---|---|
| 1 | Hailie Deegan | David Gilliland Racing | Ford |
| 02 | Kaz Grala | Young's Motorsports | Chevrolet |
| 4 | John Hunter Nemechek | Kyle Busch Motorsports | Toyota |
| 9 | Blaine Perkins (R) | CR7 Motorsports | Chevrolet |
| 12 | Spencer Boyd | Young's Motorsports | Chevrolet |
| 13 | Johnny Sauter | ThorSport Racing | Toyota |
| 15 | Tanner Gray | David Gilliland Racing | Ford |
| 16 | Tyler Ankrum | Hattori Racing Enterprises | Toyota |
| 17 | Taylor Gray | David Gilliland Racing | Ford |
| 18 | Chandler Smith | Kyle Busch Motorsports | Toyota |
| 19 | Derek Kraus | McAnally–Hilgemann Racing | Chevrolet |
| 20 | Jesse Little | Young's Motorsports | Chevrolet |
| 22 | Austin Wayne Self | AM Racing | Chevrolet |
| 23 | Grant Enfinger | GMS Racing | Chevrolet |
| 24 | Jack Wood (R) | GMS Racing | Chevrolet |
| 25 | Matt DiBenedetto | Rackley W.A.R. | Chevrolet |
| 30 | Chris Hacker | On Point Motorsports | Toyota |
| 33 | Josh Reaume | Reaume Brothers Racing | Toyota |
| 35 | Jake Garcia | McAnally–Hilgemann Racing | Chevrolet |
| 38 | Zane Smith | Front Row Motorsports | Ford |
| 40 | Dean Thompson (R) | Niece Motorsports | Chevrolet |
| 41 | Chad Chastain | Niece Motorsports | Chevrolet |
| 42 | Carson Hocevar | Niece Motorsports | Chevrolet |
| 43 | Blake Lothian | Reaume Brothers Racing | Chevrolet |
| 44 | Kris Wright | Niece Motorsports | Chevrolet |
| 45 | Lawless Alan (R) | Niece Motorsports | Chevrolet |
| 51 | Corey Heim (R) | Kyle Busch Motorsports | Toyota |
| 52 | Stewart Friesen | Halmar Friesen Racing | Toyota |
| 56 | Timmy Hill | Hill Motorsports | Toyota |
| 61 | Chase Purdy | Hattori Racing Enterprises | Toyota |
| 62 | Layne Riggs | Halmar Friesen Racing | Toyota |
| 66 | Ty Majeski | ThorSport Racing | Toyota |
| 88 | Matt Crafton | ThorSport Racing | Toyota |
| 91 | Colby Howard | McAnally–Hilgemann Racing | Chevrolet |
| 98 | Christian Eckes | ThorSport Racing | Toyota |
| 99 | Ben Rhodes | ThorSport Racing | Toyota |
Official entry list

== Practice ==
The only 50-minute practice session was held on Friday, July 29, at 11:05 AM EST. Grant Enfinger, driving for GMS Racing, was the fastest in the session, with a lap of 22.538, and an average speed of 109.575 mph (176.344 km/h).

| Pos. | # | Driver | Team | Make | Time | Speed |
|---|---|---|---|---|---|---|
| 1 | 23 | Grant Enfinger | GMS Racing | Chevrolet | 22.538 | 109.575 |
| 2 | 4 | John Hunter Nemechek | Kyle Busch Motorsports | Toyota | 22.615 | 109.202 |
| 3 | 18 | Chandler Smith | Kyle Busch Motorsports | Toyota | 22.659 | 108.990 |
Full practice results

== Qualifying ==
Qualifying was held on Friday, July 29, at 5:05 PM EST. Since Lucas Oil Indianapolis Raceway Park is an oval track, the qualifying system used is a single-car, two-lap system with only one round. Whoever sets the fastest time in the round wins the pole. John Hunter Nemechek, driving for Kyle Busch Motorsports, scored the pole for the race, with a lap of 22.211, and an average speed of 111.188 mph (178.940 km/h).

| Pos. | # | Driver | Team | Make | Time | Speed |
|---|---|---|---|---|---|---|
| 1 | 4 | John Hunter Nemechek | Kyle Busch Motorsports | Toyota | 22.211 | 111.188 |
| 2 | 18 | Chandler Smith | Kyle Busch Motorsports | Toyota | 22.249 | 110.998 |
| 3 | 98 | Christian Eckes | ThorSport Racing | Toyota | 22.347 | 110.511 |
| 4 | 51 | Corey Heim (R) | Kyle Busch Motorsports | Toyota | 22.378 | 110.358 |
| 5 | 23 | Grant Enfinger | GMS Racing | Chevrolet | 22.383 | 110.334 |
| 6 | 66 | Ty Majeski | ThorSport Racing | Toyota | 22.407 | 110.216 |
| 7 | 42 | Carson Hocevar | Niece Motorsports | Chevrolet | 22.420 | 110.152 |
| 8 | 52 | Stewart Friesen | Halmar Friesen Racing | Toyota | 22.431 | 110.098 |
| 9 | 99 | Ben Rhodes | ThorSport Racing | Toyota | 22.494 | 109.789 |
| 10 | 19 | Derek Kraus | McAnally–Hilgemann Racing | Chevrolet | 22.532 | 109.604 |
| 11 | 16 | Tyler Ankrum | Hattori Racing Enterprises | Toyota | 22.581 | 109.366 |
| 12 | 91 | Colby Howard | McAnally–Hilgemann Racing | Chevrolet | 22.596 | 109.294 |
| 13 | 17 | Taylor Gray | David Gilliland Racing | Ford | 22.598 | 109.284 |
| 14 | 15 | Tanner Gray | David Gilliland Racing | Ford | 22.621 | 109.173 |
| 15 | 13 | Johnny Sauter | ThorSport Racing | Toyota | 22.711 | 108.740 |
| 16 | 88 | Matt Crafton | ThorSport Racing | Toyota | 22.712 | 108.735 |
| 17 | 1 | Hailie Deegan | David Gilliland Racing | Ford | 22.760 | 108.506 |
| 18 | 25 | Matt DiBenedetto | Rackley W.A.R. | Chevrolet | 22.872 | 107.975 |
| 19 | 24 | Jack Wood (R) | GMS Racing | Chevrolet | 22.908 | 107.805 |
| 20 | 22 | Austin Wayne Self | AM Racing | Chevrolet | 22.961 | 107.556 |
| 21 | 38 | Zane Smith | Front Row Motorsports | Ford | 22.971 | 107.509 |
| 22 | 45 | Lawless Alan (R) | Niece Motorsports | Chevrolet | 23.047 | 107.155 |
| 23 | 62 | Layne Riggs | Halmar Friesen Racing | Toyota | 23.054 | 107.122 |
| 24 | 35 | Jake Garcia | McAnally–Hilgemann Racing | Chevrolet | 23.094 | 106.937 |
| 25 | 40 | Dean Thompson (R) | Niece Motorsports | Chevrolet | 23.122 | 106.807 |
| 26 | 9 | Blaine Perkins (R) | CR7 Motorsports | Chevrolet | 23.130 | 106.770 |
| 27 | 02 | Kaz Grala | Young's Motorsports | Chevrolet | 23.271 | 106.124 |
| 28 | 44 | Kris Wright | Niece Motorsports | Chevrolet | 23.289 | 106.041 |
| 29 | 12 | Spencer Boyd | Young's Motorsports | Chevrolet | 23.429 | 105.408 |
| 30 | 41 | Chad Chastain | Niece Motorsports | Chevrolet | 23.485 | 105.156 |
| 31 | 56 | Timmy Hill | Hill Motorsports | Toyota | 23.496 | 105.107 |
Qualified by owner's points
| 32 | 43 | Blake Lothian | Reaume Brothers Racing | Chevrolet | 24.191 | 102.088 |
| 33 | 61 | Chase Purdy | Hattori Racing Enterprises | Toyota | - | - |
| 34 | 30 | Chris Hacker | On Point Motorsports | Toyota | - | - |
| 35 | 33 | Josh Reaume | Reaume Brothers Racing | Toyota | - | - |
| 36 | 20 | Jesse Little | Young's Motorsports | Chevrolet | - | - |
Official qualifying results
Official starting lineup

== Race results ==
Stage 1 Laps: 60

| Pos. | # | Driver | Team | Make | Pts |
|---|---|---|---|---|---|
| 1 | 4 | John Hunter Nemechek | Kyle Busch Motorsports | Toyota | 10 |
| 2 | 18 | Chandler Smith | Kyle Busch Motorsports | Toyota | 9 |
| 3 | 42 | Carson Hocevar | Niece Motorsports | Chevrolet | 8 |
| 4 | 52 | Stewart Friesen | Halmar Friesen Racing | Toyota | 7 |
| 5 | 23 | Grant Enfinger | GMS Racing | Chevrolet | 6 |
| 6 | 99 | Ben Rhodes | ThorSport Racing | Toyota | 5 |
| 7 | 51 | Corey Heim (R) | Kyle Busch Motorsports | Toyota | 4 |
| 8 | 66 | Ty Majeski | ThorSport Racing | Toyota | 3 |
| 9 | 38 | Zane Smith | Front Row Motorsports | Ford | 2 |
| 10 | 98 | Christian Eckes | ThorSport Racing | Toyota | 1 |

Stage 2 Laps: 60

| Pos. | # | Driver | Team | Make | Pts |
|---|---|---|---|---|---|
| 1 | 66 | Ty Majeski | ThorSport Racing | Toyota | 10 |
| 2 | 23 | Grant Enfinger | GMS Racing | Chevrolet | 9 |
| 3 | 99 | Ben Rhodes | ThorSport Racing | Toyota | 8 |
| 4 | 42 | Carson Hocevar | Niece Motorsports | Chevrolet | 7 |
| 5 | 38 | Zane Smith | Front Row Motorsports | Ford | 6 |
| 6 | 51 | Corey Heim (R) | Kyle Busch Motorsports | Toyota | 5 |
| 7 | 52 | Stewart Friesen | Halmar Friesen Racing | Toyota | 4 |
| 8 | 18 | Chandler Smith | Kyle Busch Motorsports | Toyota | 3 |
| 9 | 16 | Tyler Ankrum | Hattori Racing Enterprises | Toyota | 2 |
| 10 | 91 | Colby Howard | McAnally–Hilgemann Racing | Chevrolet | 1 |

Stage 3 Laps: 87

| Fin. | St | # | Driver | Team | Make | Laps | Led | Status | Pts |
|---|---|---|---|---|---|---|---|---|---|
| 1 | 5 | 23 | Grant Enfinger | GMS Racing | Chevrolet | 207 | 13 | Running | 55 |
| 2 | 9 | 99 | Ben Rhodes | ThorSport Racing | Toyota | 207 | 0 | Running | 48 |
| 3 | 21 | 38 | Zane Smith | Front Row Motorsports | Ford | 207 | 0 | Running | 42 |
| 4 | 8 | 52 | Stewart Friesen | Halmar Friesen Racing | Toyota | 207 | 0 | Running | 44 |
| 5 | 4 | 51 | Corey Heim (R) | Kyle Busch Motorsports | Toyota | 207 | 0 | Running | 41 |
| 6 | 11 | 16 | Tyler Ankrum | Hattori Racing Enterprises | Toyota | 207 | 0 | Running | 33 |
| 7 | 23 | 62 | Layne Riggs | Halmar Friesen Racing | Toyota | 207 | 0 | Running | 30 |
| 8 | 6 | 66 | Ty Majeski | ThorSport Racing | Toyota | 207 | 71 | Running | 42 |
| 9 | 16 | 88 | Matt Crafton | ThorSport Racing | Toyota | 207 | 0 | Running | 28 |
| 10 | 1 | 4 | John Hunter Nemechek | Kyle Busch Motorsports | Toyota | 207 | 75 | Running | 37 |
| 11 | 18 | 25 | Matt DiBenedetto | Rackley W.A.R. | Chevrolet | 207 | 0 | Running | 26 |
| 12 | 15 | 13 | Johnny Sauter | ThorSport Racing | Toyota | 207 | 0 | Running | 25 |
| 13 | 17 | 1 | Hailie Deegan | David Gilliland Racing | Ford | 207 | 0 | Running | 24 |
| 14 | 10 | 19 | Derek Kraus | McAnally–Hilgemann Racing | Chevrolet | 207 | 0 | Running | 23 |
| 15 | 36 | 20 | Jesse Little | Young's Motorsports | Chevrolet | 207 | 0 | Running | 22 |
| 16 | 3 | 98 | Christian Eckes | ThorSport Racing | Toyota | 207 | 0 | Running | 22 |
| 17 | 31 | 56 | Timmy Hill | Hill Motorsports | Toyota | 207 | 0 | Running | 20 |
| 18 | 2 | 18 | Chandler Smith | Kyle Busch Motorsports | Toyota | 207 | 13 | Running | 31 |
| 19 | 20 | 22 | Austin Wayne Self | AM Racing | Chevrolet | 207 | 0 | Running | 18 |
| 20 | 27 | 02 | Kaz Grala | Young's Motorsports | Chevrolet | 207 | 0 | Running | 17 |
| 21 | 7 | 42 | Carson Hocevar | Niece Motorsports | Chevrolet | 207 | 34 | Running | 31 |
| 22 | 13 | 17 | Taylor Gray | David Gilliland Racing | Ford | 207 | 1 | Running | 15 |
| 23 | 14 | 15 | Tanner Gray | David Gilliland Racing | Ford | 207 | 0 | Running | 14 |
| 24 | 34 | 30 | Chris Hacker | On Point Motorsports | Toyota | 207 | 0 | Running | 13 |
| 25 | 19 | 24 | Jack Wood (R) | GMS Racing | Chevrolet | 207 | 0 | Running | 12 |
| 26 | 26 | 9 | Blaine Perkins (R) | CR7 Motorsports | Chevrolet | 207 | 0 | Running | 11 |
| 27 | 33 | 61 | Chase Purdy | Hattori Racing Enterprises | Toyota | 206 | 0 | Running | 10 |
| 28 | 24 | 35 | Jake Garcia | McAnally–Hilgemann Racing | Chevrolet | 206 | 0 | Running | 9 |
| 29 | 25 | 40 | Dean Thompson (R) | Niece Motorsports | Chevrolet | 204 | 0 | Running | 8 |
| 30 | 30 | 41 | Chad Chastain | Niece Motorsports | Chevrolet | 204 | 0 | Running | 7 |
| 31 | 28 | 44 | Kris Wright | Niece Motorsports | Chevrolet | 204 | 0 | Running | 6 |
| 32 | 12 | 91 | Colby Howard | McAnally–Hilgemann Racing | Chevrolet | 190 | 0 | Accident | 6 |
| 33 | 35 | 33 | Josh Reaume | Reaume Brothers Racing | Toyota | 153 | 0 | Too Slow | 4 |
| 34 | 22 | 45 | Lawless Alan (R) | Niece Motorsports | Chevrolet | 147 | 0 | Accident | 3 |
| 35 | 32 | 43 | Blake Lothian | Reaume Brothers Racing | Chevrolet | 72 | 0 | Driveshaft | 2 |
| 36 | 29 | 12 | Spencer Boyd | Young's Motorsports | Chevrolet | 9 | 0 | Accident | 1 |
Official race results

== Standings after the race ==
Drivers' Championship standings

| | Pos | Driver | Points |
|---|---|---|---|
| | 1 | Zane Smith | 2,079 |
| 1 | 2 | Ben Rhodes | 2,065 (-14) |
| 6 | 3 | Grant Enfinger | 2,057 (-22) |
| 1 | 4 | Stewart Friesen | 2,057 (-22) |
| 1 | 5 | John Hunter Nemechek | 2,053 (-26) |
| 4 | 6 | Chandler Smith | 2,053 (-26) |
| | 7 | Ty Majeski | 2,048 (-31) |
| | 8 | Carson Hocevar | 2,036 (-43) |
| 1 | 9 | Matt Crafton | 2,029 (-50) |
| 4 | 10 | Christian Eckes | 2,029 (-50) |
Official driver's standings

- Note: Only the first 10 positions are included for the driver standings.

| Previous race: 2022 CRC Brakleen 150 | NASCAR Camping World Truck Series; 2022 season | Next race: 2022 Worldwide Express 250 |
