= 2023 SpeedyCash.com 250 =

5th race of the 2023 NASCAR Craftsman Truck Series

Race details
- Race 5 of 23 of the 2023 NASCAR Craftsman Truck Series
- Date: April 1, 2023
- Official name: 25th Annual SpeedyCash.com 250
- Location: Texas Motor Speedway, Fort Worth, Texas
- Course: Permanent racing facility
- Course length: 1.5 miles (2.4 km)
- Distance: 172 laps, 258 mi (415 km)
- Scheduled distance: 167 laps, 250 mi (403 km)
- Average speed: 99.390 mph (159.953 km/h)

Pole position
Driver	Nick Sanchez	Rev Racing
- Time: 29.109

Most laps led
Driver	Nick Sanchez	Rev Racing
- Laps: 168

Winner
No. 42	Carson Hocevar	Niece Motorsports

Television in the United States
- Network: FS1
- Announcers: Jamie Little, Phil Parsons, and Michael Waltrip

Radio in the United States
- Radio: MRN

The 2023 SpeedyCash.com 250 was the 5th stock car race of the 2023 NASCAR Craftsman Truck Series, and the 25th iteration of the event. The race was held on Saturday, April 1, 2023, in Fort Worth, Texas at Texas Motor Speedway, a 1.5 miles (2.4 km) permanent tri-oval shaped racetrack. The race was increased from 167 to 172 laps, due to numerous NASCAR overtime attempts. In a wild finish, Carson Hocevar, driving for Niece Motorsports, would win the race after the leaders of Nick Sanchez and Zane Smith crashed on the final lap. This was Hocevar's first career NASCAR Craftsman Truck Series win. Sanchez would dominate the entire race, winning both stages and leading 168 of the 172 laps. To fill out the podium, Chase Purdy, driving for Kyle Busch Motorsports, and Stewart Friesen, driving for Halmar Friesen Racing, would finish 2nd and 3rd, respectively.

The race was marred by a wreck on lap 146. Dean Thompson would spin coming off of turn four, and after the caution came out, he would get t-boned by Matt Mills and Trey Hutchens at nearly full speed, causing significant damage to his truck. Thompson was able to climb out of the truck under his own power but required medical assistance shortly after. He was later taken to Baylor Scott & White Medical Center for further evaluation.

== Background ==
Texas Motor Speedway is a speedway located in the northernmost portion of the U.S. city of Fort Worth, Texas – the portion located in Denton County, Texas. The track measures 1.5 miles (2.4 km) around and is banked 24 degrees in the turns, and is of the oval design, where the front straightaway juts outward slightly. The track layout is similar to Atlanta Motor Speedway and Charlotte Motor Speedway (formerly Lowe's Motor Speedway). The track is owned by Speedway Motorsports, Inc., the same company that owns Atlanta and Charlotte Motor Speedway, as well as the short-track Bristol Motor Speedway.

Despite the Cup Series and Xfinity Series racing at Texas in September, the race was run as a support race for the PPG 375, an IndyCar Series race.

=== Entry list ===
- (R) denotes rookie driver.

#	Driver	Team	Make
02	Kris Wright	Young's Motorsports	Chevrolet
2	Nick Sanchez (R)	Rev Racing	Chevrolet
04	Kaden Honeycutt	Roper Racing	Ford
4	Chase Purdy	Kyle Busch Motorsports	Chevrolet
5	Dean Thompson	Tricon Garage	Toyota
9	Colby Howard	CR7 Motorsports	Chevrolet
11	Corey Heim	Tricon Garage	Toyota
12	Spencer Boyd	Young's Motorsports	Chevrolet
13	Hailie Deegan	ThorSport Racing	Ford
14	Trey Hutchens	Trey Hutchens Racing	Chevrolet
15	Tanner Gray	Tricon Garage	Toyota
16	Tyler Ankrum	Hattori Racing Enterprises	Toyota
17	Taylor Gray (R)	Tricon Garage	Toyota
19	Christian Eckes	McAnally–Hilgemann Racing	Chevrolet
20	Matt Mills	Young's Motorsports	Chevrolet
22	Josh Reaume	AM Racing	Ford
23	Grant Enfinger	GMS Racing	Chevrolet
24	Rajah Caruth (R)	GMS Racing	Chevrolet
25	Matt DiBenedetto	Rackley W.A.R.	Chevrolet
30	Ryan Vargas	On Point Motorsports	Toyota
32	Bret Holmes (R)	Bret Holmes Racing	Chevrolet
33	Mason Massey	Reaume Brothers Racing	Ford
34	Keith McGee	Reaume Brothers Racing	Ford
35	Jake Garcia (R)	McAnally–Hilgemann Racing	Chevrolet
38	Zane Smith	Front Row Motorsports	Ford
41	Chad Chastain	Niece Motorsports	Chevrolet
42	Carson Hocevar	Niece Motorsports	Chevrolet
43	Daniel Dye (R)	GMS Racing	Chevrolet
45	Lawless Alan	Niece Motorsports	Chevrolet
46	Armani Williams	G2G Racing	Toyota
51	Jack Wood	Kyle Busch Motorsports	Chevrolet
52	Stewart Friesen	Halmar Friesen Racing	Toyota
56	Tyler Hill	Hill Motorsports	Toyota
88	Matt Crafton	ThorSport Racing	Ford
98	Ty Majeski	ThorSport Racing	Ford
99	Ben Rhodes	ThorSport Racing	Ford
Official entry list

== Practice ==
The first and only practice session was held on Saturday, April 1, at 9:35 AM CST, and would last for 30 minutes. Christian Eckes, driving for McAnally–Hilgemann Racing, would set the fastest time in the session, with a lap of 29.259, and an average speed of 184.559 mph (297.019 km/h).

Pos.	#	Driver	Team	Make	Time	Speed
1	19	Christian Eckes	McAnally–Hilgemann Racing	Chevrolet	29.259	184.559
2	98	Ty Majeski	ThorSport Racing	Ford	29.301	184.294
3	4	Chase Purdy	Kyle Busch Motorsports	Chevrolet	29.318	184.187
Full practice results

== Qualifying ==
Qualifying was held on Saturday, April 1, at 10:05 AM CST. Since Texas Motor Speedway is an intermediate racetrack, the qualifying system used is a single-car, single-lap system with only one round. In that round, whoever sets the fastest time will win the pole. Nick Sanchez, driving for Rev Racing, would score the pole for the race, with a lap of 29.109, and an average speed of 185.510 mph (298.549 km/h).

Pos.	#	Driver	Team	Make	Time	Speed
1	2	Nick Sanchez (R)	Rev Racing	Chevrolet	29.109	185.510
2	51	Jack Wood	Kyle Busch Motorsports	Chevrolet	29.204	184.906
3	98	Ty Majeski	ThorSport Racing	Ford	29.216	184.830
4	11	Corey Heim	Tricon Garage	Toyota	29.221	184.799
5	42	Carson Hocevar	Niece Motorsports	Chevrolet	29.237	184.697
6	19	Christian Eckes	McAnally–Hilgemann Racing	Chevrolet	29.242	184.666
7	52	Stewart Friesen	Halmar Friesen Racing	Toyota	29.258	184.565
8	16	Tyler Ankrum	Hattori Racing Enterprises	Toyota	29.265	184.521
9	35	Jake Garcia (R)	McAnally–Hilgemann Racing	Chevrolet	29.271	184.483
10	99	Ben Rhodes	ThorSport Racing	Ford	29.322	184.162
11	15	Tanner Gray	Tricon Garage	Toyota	29.329	184.118
12	32	Bret Holmes (R)	Bret Holmes Racing	Chevrolet	29.365	183.892
13	23	Grant Enfinger	GMS Racing	Chevrolet	29.366	183.886
14	4	Chase Purdy	Kyle Busch Motorsports	Chevrolet	29.373	183.842
15	24	Rajah Caruth (R)	GMS Racing	Chevrolet	29.436	183.449
16	5	Dean Thompson	Tricon Garage	Toyota	29.449	183.368
17	17	Taylor Gray (R)	Tricon Garage	Toyota	29.519	182.933
18	38	Zane Smith	Front Row Motorsports	Ford	29.520	182.927
19	45	Lawless Alan	Niece Motorsports	Chevrolet	29.632	182.235
20	43	Daniel Dye (R)	GMS Racing	Chevrolet	29.679	181.947
21	88	Matt Crafton	ThorSport Racing	Ford	29.683	181.922
22	41	Chad Chastain	Niece Motorsports	Chevrolet	29.878	180.735
23	02	Kris Wright	Young's Motorsports	Chevrolet	29.975	180.150
24	9	Colby Howard	CR7 Motorsports	Chevrolet	29.980	180.120
25	13	Hailie Deegan	ThorSport Racing	Ford	30.038	179.772
26	30	Ryan Vargas	On Point Motorsports	Toyota	30.217	178.707
27	33	Mason Massey	Reaume Brothers Racing	Ford	30.287	178.294
28	20	Matt Mills	Young's Motorsports	Chevrolet	30.395	177.661
29	22	Josh Reaume	Reaume Brothers Racing	Ford	30.952	174.464
30	14	Trey Hutchens	Trey Hutchens Racing	Chevrolet	31.973	168.893
31	34	Keith McGee	Reaume Brothers Racing	Ford	32.111	168.167
Qualified by owner's points
32	46	Armani Williams	G2G Racing	Toyota	32.448	166.420
33	25	Matt DiBenedetto	Rackley W.A.R.	Chevrolet	–	–
34	12	Spencer Boyd	Young's Motorsports	Chevrolet	–	–
Withdrew
35	04	Kaden Honeycutt	Roper Racing	Ford	–	–
36	56	Tyler Hill	Hill Motorsports	Toyota	–	–
Official qualifying results
Official starting lineup

== Race results ==
Pole Sitter Nick Sanchez dominated the racing, sweeping Stages 1 and 2. However the race came to a halt on Lap 146 when Dean Thompson spun off of Turn 4 and hit the wall. Thompson's truck was then T-boned by Matt Mills and hit again by Trey Hutchens. Thompson was able to walk out of his truck under his own power but was ultimately taken to a local hospital for further medical evaluations. The race came under the Red flag as track personnel cleared the track of the wreckage and debris. The race resumed and the end came down to double-overtime. On the second overtime, Sanchez and Zane Smith were side-by-side battling for the lead with Christian Eckes and Carson Hocevar following behind. Just after the white flag waved, Sanchez and Smith made contact with one another which led to Hocevar unintentionally bumping Sanchez from behind. The resulting spin from the bump caused a wreck between Sanchez, Smith and Eckes, which allowed Hocevar to take the lead as the caution flag came out. As a result of the white flag waving before the caution, the race ended with Hocevar winning his first career Truck Series race.

Stage 1 Laps: 77

Pos.	#	Driver	Team	Make	Pts
1	2	Nick Sanchez (R)	Rev Racing	Chevrolet	10
2	99	Ben Rhodes	ThorSport Racing	Ford	9
3	19	Christian Eckes	McAnally–Hilgemann Racing	Chevrolet	8
4	98	Ty Majeski	ThorSport Racing	Ford	7
5	38	Zane Smith	Front Row Motorsports	Ford	6
6	5	Dean Thompson	Tricon Garage	Toyota	5
7	11	Corey Heim	Tricon Garage	Toyota	4
8	4	Chase Purdy	Kyle Busch Motorsports	Chevrolet	3
9	52	Stewart Friesen	Halmar Friesen Racing	Toyota	2
10	23	Grant Enfinger	GMS Racing	Chevrolet	1

Stage 2 Laps: 45

Pos.	#	Driver	Team	Make	Pts
1	2	Nick Sanchez (R)	Rev Racing	Chevrolet	10
2	19	Christian Eckes	McAnally–Hilgemann Racing	Chevrolet	9
3	99	Ben Rhodes	ThorSport Racing	Ford	8
4	5	Dean Thompson	Tricon Garage	Toyota	7
5	38	Zane Smith	Front Row Motorsports	Ford	6
6	15	Tanner Gray	Tricon Garage	Toyota	5
7	11	Corey Heim	Tricon Garage	Toyota	4
8	4	Chase Purdy	Kyle Busch Motorsports	Chevrolet	3
9	17	Taylor Gray (R)	Tricon Garage	Toyota	2
10	88	Matt Crafton	ThorSport Racing	Ford	1

Stage 3 Laps: 50

Fin	St	#	Driver	Team	Make	Laps	Led	Status	Pts
1	5	42	Carson Hocevar	Niece Motorsports	Chevrolet	172	1	Running	40
2	14	4	Chase Purdy	Kyle Busch Motorsports	Chevrolet	172	0	Running	41
3	7	52	Stewart Friesen	Halmar Friesen Racing	Toyota	172	0	Running	36
4	3	98	Ty Majeski	ThorSport Racing	Ford	172	0	Running	40
5	9	35	Jake Garcia (R)	McAnally–Hilgemann Racing	Chevrolet	172	0	Running	32
6	25	13	Hailie Deegan	ThorSport Racing	Ford	172	0	Running	31
7	4	11	Corey Heim	Tricon Garage	Toyota	172	0	Running	38
8	26	30	Ryan Vargas	On Point Motorsports	Toyota	172	0	Running	29
9	2	51	Jack Wood	Kyle Busch Motorsports	Chevrolet	172	0	Running	28
10	10	99	Ben Rhodes	ThorSport Racing	Ford	172	1	Running	44
11	27	33	Mason Massey	Reaume Brothers Racing	Ford	172	0	Running	26
12	23	02	Kris Wright	Young's Motorsports	Chevrolet	172	0	Running	25
13	21	88	Matt Crafton	ThorSport Racing	Ford	172	0	Running	25
14	18	38	Zane Smith	Front Row Motorsports	Ford	172	0	Running	35
15	6	19	Christian Eckes	McAnally–Hilgemann Racing	Chevrolet	172	2	Running	39
16	1	2	Nick Sanchez (R)	Rev Racing	Chevrolet	171	168	Accident	41
17	13	23	Grant Enfinger	GMS Racing	Chevrolet	171	0	Running	21
18	19	45	Lawless Alan	Niece Motorsports	Chevrolet	170	0	Running	19
19	15	24	Rajah Caruth (R)	GMS Racing	Chevrolet	169	0	Running	18
20	24	9	Colby Howard	CR7 Motorsports	Chevrolet	169	0	Running	17
21	29	22	Josh Reaume	AM Racing	Ford	168	0	Running	16
22	34	12	Spencer Boyd	Young's Motorsports	Chevrolet	168	0	Running	15
23	12	32	Bret Holmes (R)	Bret Holmes Racing	Chevrolet	167	0	Running	14
24	17	17	Taylor Gray (R)	Tricon Garage	Toyota	166	0	Running	15
25	20	43	Daniel Dye (R)	GMS Racing	Chevrolet	165	0	Running	12
26	8	16	Tyler Ankrum	Hattori Racing Enterprises	Toyota	164	0	Running	11
27	11	15	Tanner Gray	Tricon Garage	Toyota	161	0	Accident	15
28	16	5	Dean Thompson	Tricon Garage	Toyota	143	0	Accident	21
29	32	46	Armani Williams	G2G Racing	Toyota	140	0	Accident	8
30	30	14	Trey Hutchens	Trey Hutchens Racing	Chevrolet	137	0	Accident	7
31	28	20	Matt Mills	Young's Motorsports	Chevrolet	134	0	Accident	6
32	33	25	Matt DiBenedetto	Rackley W.A.R.	Chevrolet	122	0	Vibration	5
33	31	34	Keith McGee	Reaume Brothers Racing	Ford	39	0	Vibration	4
34	22	41	Chad Chastain	Niece Motorsports	Chevrolet	17	0	Accident	3
Official race results

== Standings after the race ==
Drivers' Championship standings

	Pos	Driver	Points
1	1	Ty Majeski	206
1	2	Zane Smith	203 (-3)
	3	Ben Rhodes	194 (-12)
	4	Christian Eckes	187 (-19)
1	5	Matt Crafton	155 (-51)
1	6	Grant Enfinger	152 (-54)
4	7	Chase Purdy	148 (-58)
1	8	Corey Heim	148 (-58)
3	9	Nick Sanchez	139 (-67)
3	10	Tyler Ankrum	125 (-81)
Official driver's standings

- Note: Only the first 10 positions are included for the driver standings.

Previous race: 2023 XPEL 225	NASCAR Craftsman Truck Series; 2023 season	Next race: 2023 Weather Guard Truck Race on Dirt
