= 2023 RAPTOR King of Tough 250 =

5th race of the 2023 NASCAR Xfinity Series

Race details
- Race 5 of 33 of the 2023 NASCAR Xfinity Series
- Date: March 18, 2023
- Official name: 32nd Annual RAPTOR King of Tough 250
- Location: Atlanta Motor Speedway, Hampton, Georgia
- Course: Permanent racing facility
- Course length: 1.54 miles (2.48 km)
- Distance: 163 laps, 251 mi (403 km)
- Scheduled distance: 163 laps, 251 mi (403 km)
- Average speed: 91.382 mph (147.065 km/h)

Pole position
Driver	Sammy Smith	Joe Gibbs Racing
- Grid positions set by competition-based formula

Most laps led
Driver	Austin Hill	Richard Childress Racing
- Laps: 103

Winner
No. 21	Austin Hill	Richard Childress Racing

Television in the United States
- Network: FS1
- Announcers: Adam Alexander, Daniel Suárez, and Joey Logano

Radio in the United States
- Radio: MRN

The 2023 RAPTOR King of Tough 250 was the 5th stock car race of the 2023 NASCAR Xfinity Series, and the 32nd iteration of the event. The race was held on Saturday, March 18, 2023, in Hampton, Georgia at Atlanta Motor Speedway, a 1.54 miles (2.48 km) permanent tri-oval shaped superspeedway. The race took the scheduled 163 laps to complete. In a chaotic finish, Austin Hill, driving for Richard Childress Racing, would hold off the field on the final restart, and earn his fifth career NASCAR Xfinity Series win, and his third of the season. Hill dominated the race as well, leading 103 laps. To fill out the podium, Daniel Hemric, driving for Kaulig Racing, and Ryan Truex, driving for Joe Gibbs Racing, would finish 2nd and 3rd, respectively.

== Background ==
Atlanta Motor Speedway is a 1.54-mile race track in Hampton, Georgia, United States, 20 miles (32 km) south of Atlanta. It has annually hosted NASCAR Cup Series stock car races since its inauguration in 1960.

The venue was bought by Speedway Motorsports in 1990. In 1994, 46 condominiums were built over the northeastern side of the track. In 1997, to standardize the track with Speedway Motorsports' other two intermediate ovals, the entire track was almost completely rebuilt. The frontstretch and backstretch were swapped, and the configuration of the track was changed from oval to quad-oval, with a new official length of 1.54-mile (2.48 km) where before it was 1.522-mile (2.449 km). The project made the track one of the fastest on the NASCAR circuit. In July 2021 NASCAR announced that the track would be reprofiled for the 2022 season to have 28 degrees of banking and would be narrowed from 55 to 40 feet which the track claims will turn racing at the track similar to restrictor plate superspeedways. Despite the reprofiling being criticized by drivers, construction began in August 2021 and wrapped up in December 2021. The track has seating capacity of 71,000 to 125,000 people depending on the tracks configuration.

=== Entry list ===
- (R) denotes rookie driver.
- (i) denotes driver who is ineligible for series driver points.

#	Driver	Team	Make
00	Cole Custer	Stewart-Haas Racing	Ford
1	Sam Mayer	JR Motorsports	Chevrolet
02	Kyle Weatherman	Our Motorsports	Chevrolet
2	Sheldon Creed	Richard Childress Racing	Chevrolet
4	Garrett Smithley	JD Motorsports	Chevrolet
6	Brennan Poole	JD Motorsports	Chevrolet
07	Blaine Perkins (R)	SS-Green Light Racing	Chevrolet
7	Justin Allgaier	JR Motorsports	Chevrolet
08	Gray Gaulding	SS-Green Light Racing	Chevrolet
8	Josh Berry	JR Motorsports	Chevrolet
9	Brandon Jones	JR Motorsports	Chevrolet
10	Justin Haley (i)	Kaulig Racing	Chevrolet
11	Daniel Hemric	Kaulig Racing	Chevrolet
16	Chandler Smith (R)	Kaulig Racing	Chevrolet
18	Sammy Smith (R)	Joe Gibbs Racing	Toyota
19	Ryan Truex	Joe Gibbs Racing	Toyota
20	John Hunter Nemechek	Joe Gibbs Racing	Toyota
21	Austin Hill	Richard Childress Racing	Chevrolet
24	Connor Mosack (R)	Sam Hunt Racing	Toyota
25	Brett Moffitt	AM Racing	Ford
26	Kaz Grala	Sam Hunt Racing	Toyota
27	Jeb Burton	Jordan Anderson Racing	Chevrolet
28	Kyle Sieg	RSS Racing	Ford
31	Parker Retzlaff (R)	Jordan Anderson Racing	Chevrolet
35	Patrick Emerling	Emerling-Gase Motorsports	Ford
38	Joe Graf Jr.	RSS Racing	Ford
39	Ryan Sieg	RSS Racing	Ford
43	Ryan Ellis	Alpha Prime Racing	Chevrolet
44	Jeffrey Earnhardt	Alpha Prime Racing	Chevrolet
45	Sage Karam	Alpha Prime Racing	Chevrolet
48	Parker Kligerman	Big Machine Racing	Chevrolet
51	Jeremy Clements	Jeremy Clements Racing	Chevrolet
53	Joey Gase	Emerling-Gase Motorsports	Chevrolet
66	Caesar Bacarella	Alpha Prime Racing	Chevrolet
74	Dawson Cram	CHK Racing	Chevrolet
78	Anthony Alfredo	B. J. McLeod Motorsports	Chevrolet
91	Chad Chastain	DGM Racing	Chevrolet
92	Josh Williams	DGM Racing	Chevrolet
98	Riley Herbst	Stewart-Haas Racing	Ford
Official entry list

== Starting lineup ==
Qualifying was scheduled to be held on Friday, March 17, at 4:30 PM EST, but was cancelled due to constant rain showers. The starting lineup would be determined by a performance-based metric system. As a result, Sammy Smith, driving for Joe Gibbs Racing, would earn the pole. Dawson Cram would fail to qualify.

Pos.	#	Driver	Team	Make
1	18	Sammy Smith (R)	Joe Gibbs Racing	Toyota
2	20	John Hunter Nemechek	Joe Gibbs Racing	Toyota
3	21	Austin Hill	Richard Childress Racing	Chevrolet
4	19	Ryan Truex	Joe Gibbs Racing	Toyota
5	98	Riley Herbst	Stewart-Haas Racing	Ford
6	16	Chandler Smith (R)	Kaulig Racing	Chevrolet
7	2	Sheldon Creed	Richard Childress Racing	Chevrolet
8	00	Cole Custer	Stewart-Haas Racing	Ford
9	8	Josh Berry	JR Motorsports	Chevrolet
10	1	Sam Mayer	JR Motorsports	Chevrolet
11	11	Daniel Hemric	Kaulig Racing	Chevrolet
12	25	Brett Moffitt	AM Racing	Ford
13	48	Parker Kligerman	Big Machine Racing	Chevrolet
14	39	Ryan Sieg	RSS Racing	Ford
15	78	Anthony Alfredo	B. J. McLeod Motorsports	Chevrolet
16	27	Jeb Burton	Jordan Anderson Racing	Chevrolet
17	31	Parker Retzlaff (R)	Jordan Anderson Racing	Chevrolet
18	10	Justin Haley (i)	Kaulig Racing	Chevrolet
19	7	Justin Allgaier	JR Motorsports	Chevrolet
20	02	Kyle Weatherman	Our Motorsports	Chevrolet
21	9	Brandon Jones	JR Motorsports	Chevrolet
22	92	Josh Williams	DGM Racing	Chevrolet
23	51	Jeremy Clements	Jeremy Clements Racing	Chevrolet
24	43	Ryan Ellis	Alpha Prime Racing	Chevrolet
25	24	Connor Mosack (R)	Sam Hunt Racing	Toyota
26	28	Kyle Sieg	RSS Racing	Ford
27	38	Joe Graf Jr.	RSS Racing	Ford
28	26	Kaz Grala	Sam Hunt Racing	Toyota
29	6	Brennan Poole	JD Motorsports	Chevrolet
30	45	Sage Karam	Alpha Prime Racing	Chevrolet
31	44	Jeffrey Earnhardt	Alpha Prime Racing	Chevrolet
32	35	Patrick Emerling	Emerling-Gase Motorsports	Ford
33	53	Joey Gase	Emerling-Gase Motorsports	Chevrolet
Qualified by owner's points
34	4	Garrett Smithley	JD Motorsports	Chevrolet
35	08	Gray Gaulding	SS-Green Light Racing	Chevrolet
36	07	Blaine Perkins (R)	SS-Green Light Racing	Chevrolet
37	91	Chad Chastain	DGM Racing	Chevrolet
38	66	Caesar Bacarella	Alpha Prime Racing	Chevrolet
Failed to qualify
39	74	Dawson Cram	CHK Racing	Chevrolet
Official starting lineup

== Race results ==
Stage 1 Laps: 40

Pos.	#	Driver	Team	Make	Pts
1	21	Austin Hill	Richard Childress Racing	Chevrolet	10
2	2	Sheldon Creed	Richard Childress Racing	Chevrolet	9
3	20	John Hunter Nemechek	Joe Gibbs Racing	Toyota	8
4	16	Chandler Smith (R)	Kaulig Racing	Chevrolet	7
5	98	Riley Herbst	Stewart-Haas Racing	Ford	6
6	25	Brett Moffitt	AM Racing	Ford	5
7	11	Daniel Hemric	Kaulig Racing	Chevrolet	4
8	39	Ryan Sieg	RSS Racing	Ford	3
9	00	Cole Custer	Stewart-Haas Racing	Ford	2
10	10	Justin Haley (i)	Kaulig Racing	Chevrolet	1

Stage 2 Laps: 40

Pos.	#	Driver	Team	Make	Pts
1	48	Parker Kligerman	Big Machine Racing	Chevrolet	10
2	98	Riley Herbst	Stewart-Haas Racing	Ford	9
3	9	Brandon Jones	JR Motorsports	Chevrolet	8
4	2	Sheldon Creed	Richard Childress Racing	Chevrolet	7
5	78	Anthony Alfredo	B. J. McLeod Motorsports	Chevrolet	6
6	39	Ryan Sieg	RSS Racing	Ford	5
7	8	Josh Berry	JR Motorsports	Chevrolet	4
8	21	Austin Hill	Richard Childress Racing	Chevrolet	3
9	00	Cole Custer	Stewart-Haas Racing	Ford	2
10	51	Jeremy Clements	Jeremy Clements Racing	Chevrolet	1

Stage 3 Laps: 83

Fin	St	#	Driver	Team	Make	Laps	Led	Status	Pts
1	3	21	Austin Hill	Richard Childress Racing	Chevrolet	163	103	Running	53
2	11	11	Daniel Hemric	Kaulig Racing	Chevrolet	163	0	Running	39
3	4	19	Ryan Truex	Joe Gibbs Racing	Toyota	163	0	Running	34
4	13	48	Parker Kligerman	Big Machine Racing	Chevrolet	163	5	Running	43
5	5	98	Riley Herbst	Stewart-Haas Racing	Ford	163	11	Running	47
6	12	25	Brett Moffitt	AM Racing	Ford	163	0	Running	36
7	9	8	Josh Berry	JR Motorsports	Chevrolet	163	0	Running	34
8	2	20	John Hunter Nemechek	Joe Gibbs Racing	Toyota	163	10	Running	37
9	10	1	Sam Mayer	JR Motorsports	Chevrolet	163	0	Running	28
10	18	10	Justin Haley (i)	Kaulig Racing	Chevrolet	163	5	Running	0
11	14	39	Ryan Sieg	RSS Racing	Ford	163	0	Running	34
12	8	00	Cole Custer	Stewart-Haas Racing	Ford	163	0	Running	29
13	29	6	Brennan Poole	JD Motorsports	Chevrolet	163	0	Running	24
14	15	78	Anthony Alfredo	B. J. McLeod Motorsports	Chevrolet	163	18	Running	29
15	23	51	Jeremy Clements	Jeremy Clements Racing	Chevrolet	163	0	Running	23
16	16	27	Jeb Burton	Jordan Anderson Racing	Chevrolet	163	0	Running	21
17	1	18	Sammy Smith (R)	Joe Gibbs Racing	Toyota	163	0	Running	20
18	32	35	Patrick Emerling	Emerling-Gase Motorsports	Ford	163	0	Running	19
19	21	9	Brandon Jones	JR Motorsports	Chevrolet	163	10	Running	26
20	35	08	Gray Gaulding	SS-Green Light Racing	Chevrolet	163	1	Running	17
21	7	2	Sheldon Creed	Richard Childress Racing	Chevrolet	163	0	Running	32
22	36	07	Blaine Perkins (R)	SS-Green Light Racing	Chevrolet	163	0	Running	15
23	24	43	Ryan Ellis	Alpha Prime Racing	Chevrolet	163	0	Running	14
24	37	91	Chad Chastain	DGM Racing	Chevrolet	163	0	Running	0
25	27	38	Joe Graf Jr.	RSS Racing	Ford	163	0	Running	12
26	26	28	Kyle Sieg	RSS Racing	Ford	161	0	Running	11
27	17	31	Parker Retzlaff (R)	Jordan Anderson Racing	Chevrolet	154	0	Accident	10
28	6	16	Chandler Smith (R)	Kaulig Racing	Chevrolet	127	0	Rear Gear	16
29	19	7	Justin Allgaier	JR Motorsports	Chevrolet	77	0	Accident	8
30	25	24	Connor Mosack (R)	Sam Hunt Racing	Toyota	69	0	Accident	7
31	30	45	Sage Karam	Alpha Prime Racing	Chevrolet	43	0	Radiator	6
32	22	92	Josh Williams	DGM Racing	Chevrolet	33	0	Accident	5
33	20	02	Kyle Weatherman	Our Motorsports	Chevrolet	26	0	Accident	4
34	31	44	Jeffrey Earnhardt	Alpha Prime Racing	Chevrolet	11	0	Accident	3
35	28	26	Kaz Grala	Sam Hunt Racing	Toyota	11	0	Accident	2
36	34	4	Garrett Smithley	JD Motorsports	Chevrolet	11	0	Accident	1
37	35	53	Joey Gase	Emerling-Gase Motorsports	Chevrolet	1	0	Accident	1
38	38	66	Caesar Bacarella	Alpha Prime Racing	Chevrolet	1	0	Accident	1
Official race results

=== Penalties ===
During the first stage, Josh Williams sustained heavy damage on lap 27. When debris from his repaired car caused another caution, NASCAR parked him under the Damaged Vehicle Policy. In response, Williams stopped his car on the start/finish line and walked back to pit road with the car behind. As a result, NASCAR handed Williams a one-race suspension for the next race.

== Standings after the race ==
Drivers' Championship standings

	Pos	Driver	Points
	1	Austin Hill	248
	2	John Hunter Nemechek	202 (-46)
2	3	Riley Herbst	202 (–46)
	4	Chandler Smith	171 (–77)
2	5	Justin Allgaier	164 (–84)
1	6	Sam Mayer	156 (–92)
1	7	Sammy Smith	148 (–100)
1	8	Josh Berry	148 (–100)
1	9	Cole Custer	147 (–101)
	10	Daniel Hemric	145 (–103)
1	11	Parker Kligerman	142 (–106)
1	12	Sheldon Creed	137 (–111)
Official driver's standings

- Note: Only the first 12 positions are included for the driver standings.

Previous race: 2023 United Rentals 200	NASCAR Xfinity Series; 2023 season	Next race: 2023 Pit Boss 250
