= 4-17 Southern Speedway =

Racetrack

Coordinates: 26°54′29″N 82°0′1″W

- Location: 8655 Piper Rd, Punta Gorda, FL
- Owner: MotoBros
- Opened: December 15, 1990
- Architect: LeRoy Davidson
- Former names: Charlotte County Speedway (1990–2007); Punta Gorda Speedway (2008–2010); Charlotte County Motorsports Park (2011–2013); Three Palms Speedway (2013-2016)
- Website: http://www.417southernspeedway.com/

Oval
- Surface: Asphalt
- Length: 3/8 mi (0.60 km)
- Turns: 4
- Banking: Flat

The 4-17 Southern Speedway is an asphalt, 3/8th mile racetrack located in Punta Gorda, Florida, United States. The track was built in 1990 by LeRoy Davidson who operated it until 1995. It started off its life playing host to Super Late Models, late models, sprint cars, sportsmen, open wheeled modified, FASTRUCK, FASTKIDS, and several other types of racing. It sported one of the largest fields of late models in the South. The track was featured several times on the cover of Circle Track Magazine as one of the top circle tracks in the South Eastern United States.

== History ==
Glen VanHorn took over the track in 1995 until LeRoy Davidson returned to operate the track in 2002. The wrath of Hurricane Charley in 2004 took its toll on the track, but was rebuilt and reopened in 2005. Bobby Diehl took over the track for the 2007 season. Some improvements were made and many more were planned but never came to light. In 2010 the track changed owners again when Mike Chase and Kevin Williams took over the lease.

In January 2013 the track fell into turmoil when its tenant at the time, Kevin Williams could not come to an agreement with the Punta Gorda Airport on a new lease. They wanted to rise the price of the lease because the airport receives grants from the FAA and in order to get them airport property must be leased at a fair market value. When Williams lease ended and moved out he removed the grandstands and other equipment that he said he brought in but in doing so did some damage to the track.

In June 2013 the airport agreed to a new lease with Jamie Haase, to take over the track. The track was renamed Three Palms Speedway, and was to reopen August 30, 2014. The track featured Young Guns 4's, Outlaw 4's, Bombers4. Street Stocks5, Thunder Trucks6, TQ Midgets, 3PS Sprint Cars and Dwarf Cars weekly. Florida United Promoters Series Super Late Models, Pro Trucks, Sportsman, Open Wheel Modifieds, Legends Cars and Tampa Bay Area Racing Association Winged Sprint Cars also visited the track.

== Current state ==
In September 2015 the Charlotte County Airport Authority evicted the Haase family as the track promoters, citing "empty promises" and considerable unpaid debt, leaving the track idle. On Thursday, August 18, 2016, new owners Joe and Janet Gentry took over the speedway and began cleaning up weeds around the track after weeks of negotiations with the Charlotte County Airport Authority. Major renovations took place after the Gentry's obtained their lease. The speedway has re-opened and held its first race since the reopening in January 2017. In 2022, Smuggler's Enterprises submitted a proposal to demolish the racetrack and build a new entertainment venue, but the company later rescinded the proposal, and the speedway's lease transferred to the next-in-line bidder MotoBros in 2023, which intends to continue operations.
