= Chad Chastain =

American racing driver

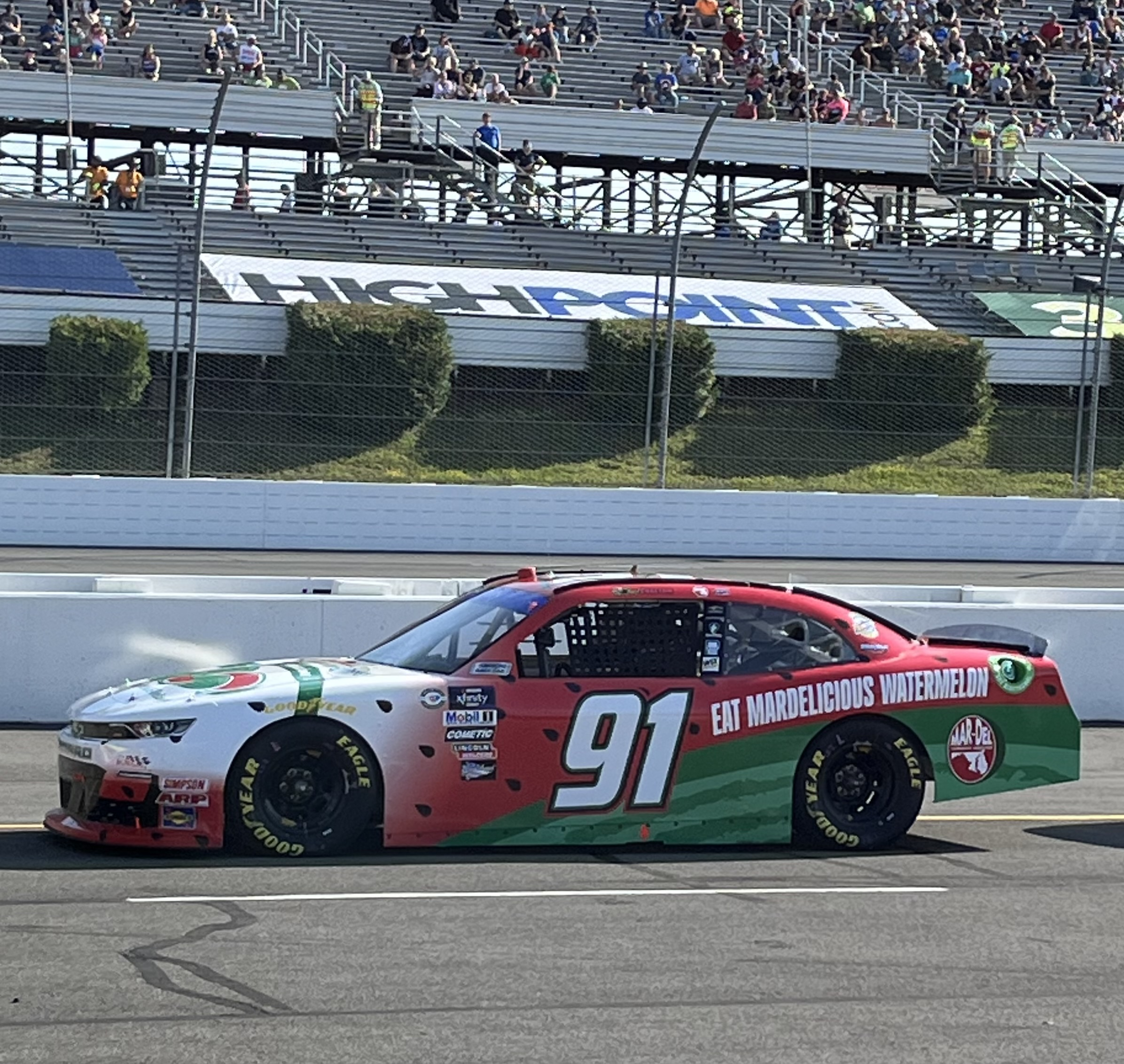
- Chastain’s Xfinity Series car in 2023 at Pocono Raceway
- Born: Chad James Chastain; October 31, 1998 (age 28); Alva, Florida, U.S.
- Achievements: 2016 4-17 Southern Speedway Pro Late Model Champion

NASCAR O'Reilly Auto Parts Series career
- 4 races run over 1 year
- 2023 position: 97th
- Best finish: 97th
- First race: 2023 RAPTOR King of Tough 250 (Atlanta)
- Last race: 2023 A-GAME 200 (Dover)
Wins	Top tens	Poles
0	0	0

NASCAR FedEx Freight Truck Series career
- 5 races run over 3 years
- 2023 position: 79th
- Best finish: 55th (2022)
- First race: 2021 United Rentals 176 at The Glen (Watkins Glen)
- Last race: 2023 SpeedyCash.com 250 (Texas)
Wins	Top tens	Poles
0	0	0
- Statistics up to date as of July 22, 2023.

Chad James Chastain (born October 31, 1998) is an American professional stock car racing driver. He last competed part-time in the NASCAR Craftsman Truck Series, driving the No. 41 Chevrolet Silverado for Niece Motorsports and part-time in the NASCAR Xfinity Series, driving the No. 91 Chevrolet Camaro for DGM Racing. He is the younger brother of NASCAR Cup Series driver Ross Chastain.

== Racing career ==
=== Early career ===
Chastain has competed in races across the southeastern United States, winning over 40 features ranging from late models to the Florida Association of Stock Car Automobile Racing (FASCAR) Pro Truck Series, and was also the 2016 Pro Late Model champion at 4-17 Southern Speedway.

=== Craftsman Truck Series ===
==== 2021 ====
Chastain was announced as driver of the No. 45 Chevrolet for Niece Motorsports for the NASCAR Camping World Truck Series race at Watkins Glen International in 2021, replacing his brother Ross, who was ruled ineligible to run the race.

==== 2022 ====
In 2022, Chastain raced in No. 41 for Niece Motorsports at Indianapolis Raceway Park. He would also race in the No. 44 at Richmond Raceway.

=== Xfinity Series ===
==== 2023 ====
On March 13, 2023, it was announced Chad would make his debut in the 2023 RAPTOR King of Tough 250 at Atlanta Motor Speedway in the No. 91 for DGM Racing, a ride his brother Ross also shares. He would finish 24th at Atlanta, 32nd at Dover, 29th at Nashville, and 30th at Pocono.

== Motorsports career results ==
=== NASCAR ===
(key) (Bold – Pole position awarded by qualifying time. Italics – Pole position earned by points standings or practice time. * – Most laps led.)

==== Xfinity Series ====
NASCAR Xfinity Series results
Year	Team	No.	Make	1	2	3	4	5	6	7	8	9	10	11	12	13	14	15	16	17	18	19	20	21	22	23	24	25	26	27	28	29	30	31	32	33	NXSC	Pts	Ref
2023	DGM Racing	91	Chevy	DAY	CAL	LVS	PHO	ATL; 24	COA	RCH	MAR	TAL	DOV; 32	DAR	CLT	PIR	SON	NSH; 29	CSC	ATL	NHA	POC; 30	ROA	MCH	IRC	GLN	DAY	DAR	KAN	BRI	TEX	ROV	LVS	HOM	MAR	PHO	97th	0^{1}	

==== Craftsman Truck Series ====
NASCAR Craftsman Truck Series results
Year	Team	No.	Make	1	2	3	4	5	6	7	8	9	10	11	12	13	14	15	16	17	18	19	20	21	22	23	NCTC	Pts	Ref
2021	Niece Motorsports	45	Chevy	DAY	DRC	LVS	ATL	BRD	RCH	KAN	DAR	COA	CLT	TEX	NSH	POC	KNX	GLN; 34	GTW	DAR	BRI	LVS	TAL	MAR	PHO		87th	3	
2022	Niece Motorsports	41	Chevy	DAY	LVS	ATL	COA	MAR	BRD	DAR	KAN	TEX	CLT	GTW	SON	KNX	NSH	MOH	POC	IRP; 30							55th	21	
2022	Niece Motorsports	44	Chevy																		RCH; 30	KAN	BRI	TAL	HOM; 30	PHO	55th	21	
2023	Niece Motorsports	41	Chevy	DAY	LVS	ATL	COA	TEX; 34	BRD	MAR	KAN	DAR	NWS	CLT	GTW	NSH	MOH										79th	3	
2023	Young's Motorsports	20	Chevy															POC; DNQ	RCH								79th	3	
2023	Niece Motorsports	44	Chevy																	IRP; DNQ	MLW	KAN	BRI	TAL	HOM	PHO	79th	3	

^{*} Season still in progress
^{1} Ineligible for series points
