= Lawless Alan =

American racing driver (born 2000)

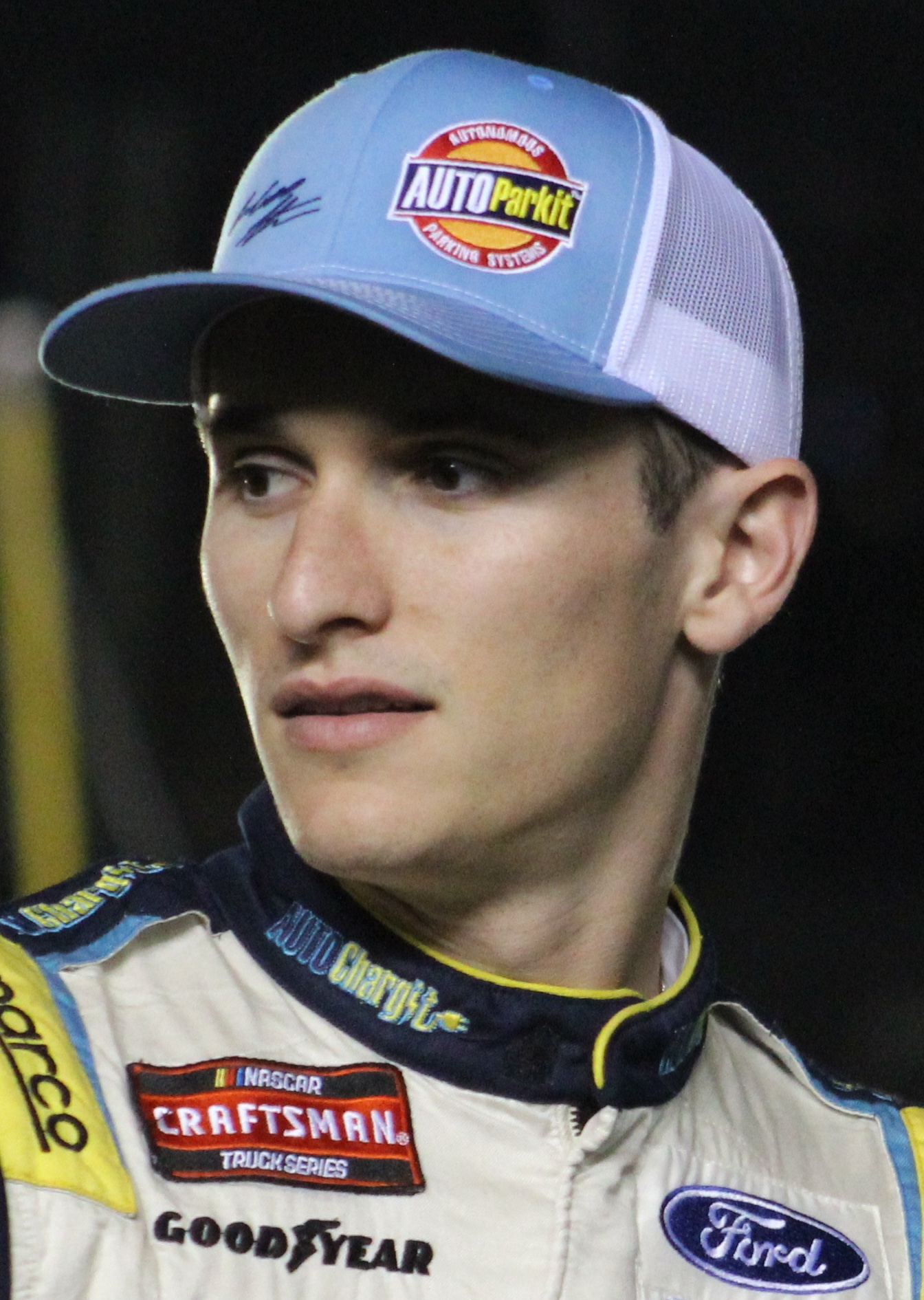
- Alan at Daytona International Speedway in 2024
- Born: February 2, 2000 (age 26); Van Nuys, California, U.S.

NASCAR O'Reilly Auto Parts Series career
- 2 races run over 1 year
- 2024 position: 95th
- Best finish: 95th (2024)
- First race: 2024 Cabo Wabo 250 (Michigan)
- Last race: 2024 Focused Health 250 (Atlanta)
Wins	Top tens	Poles
0	0	0

NASCAR FedEx Freight Truck Series career
- 78 races run over 5 years
- 2025 position: 41st
- Best finish: 22nd (2022, 2023)
- First race: 2021 BrakeBest Brake Pads 159 (Daytona RC)
- Last race: 2025 DQS Solutions & Staffing 250 (Michigan)
Wins	Top tens	Poles
0	3	0

ARCA Menards Series career
- 23 races run over 3 years
- Best finish: 5th (2025)
- First race: 2020 General Tire 150 (Phoenix)
- Last race: 2025 Southern Illinois 100 (DuQuoin)
- First win: 2025 General Tire 200 (Talladega)
Wins	Top tens	Poles
1	15	2

ARCA Menards Series East career
- 7 races run over 3 years
- Best finish: 20th (2025)
- First race: 2019 United Site Services 70 (New Hampshire)
- Last race: 2025 Atlas 150 (Iowa)
Wins	Top tens	Poles
0	5	0

ARCA Menards Series West career
- 6 races run over 3 years
- Best finish: 15th (2020)
- First race: 2019 Procore 200 (Sonoma)
- Last race: 2025 General Tire 150 (Phoenix)
Wins	Top tens	Poles
0	3	0
- Statistics up to date as of October 21, 2026.

Lawless Alan (born February 2, 2000) is an American professional stock car racing driver. He last competed part-time in the ARCA Menards Series, driving the No. 20 Toyota Camry for Venturini Motorsports and part-time in the NASCAR Craftsman Truck Series, driving the No. 1 Toyota Tundra TRD Pro for Tricon Garage. He previously competed in the NASCAR Xfinity Series.

== Racing career ==
=== Early career ===
Lawless Alan was born on February 2nd, 2000. He originally started racing legend cars at the age of 12 in Van Nuys, California.

In 2018, Alan competed in the NASCAR Whelen All-American Series for his family team, Dasher Lawless Racing.

=== ARCA ===
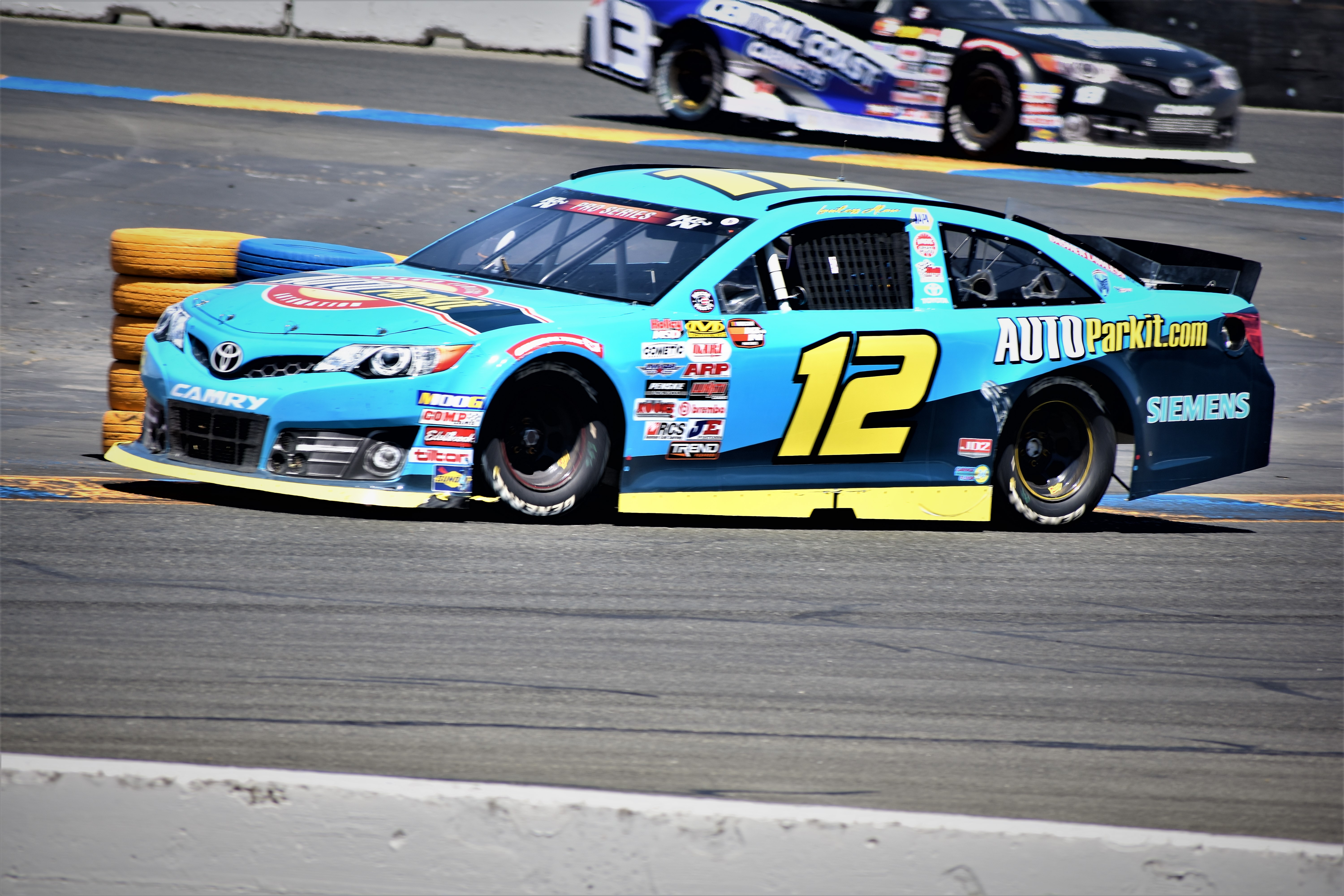
Alan at Sonoma Raceway in 2019.

After joining Bill McAnally Racing part-time in 2019, Alan returned to the team for what was to be a full season in the 2020 ARCA Menards Series West. After the first four races of the season, he and his No. 12 car stopped attempting races for unknown reasons. He did not run any more NASCAR or ARCA races for another team for the remainder of the season.

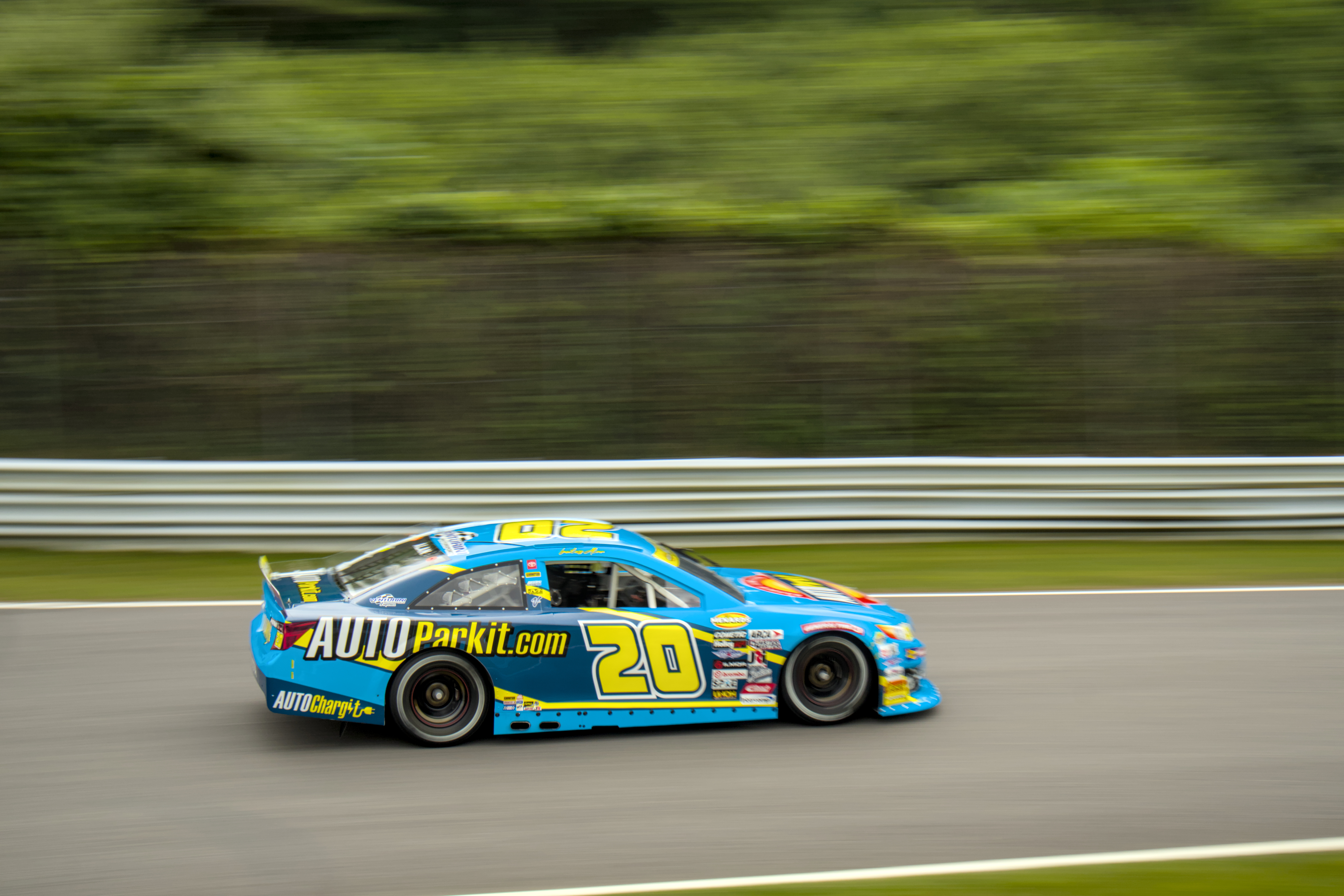
Alan's No. 20 ARCA car at the Lime Rock Park in 2025

On January 5, 2025, it was announced that Alan would drive the No. 20 Toyota full-time for Venturini Motorsports. On April 26, Alan would earn his first career ARCA victory, winning at Talladega. Alan competed in 16 races for Venturini before departing, finishing with one win, ten top-fives and ten top-tens. Despite missing the final four races, Alan finished fifth in the point standings.

=== NASCAR Craftsman Truck Series ===
Alan joined Reaume Brothers Racing to make his Truck Series debut in their No. 34 truck at the Daytona Road Course in 2021. Reaume Brothers Racing signed Alan for an additional three races during the 2021 Truck schedule. He also joined Niece Motorsports for four races.

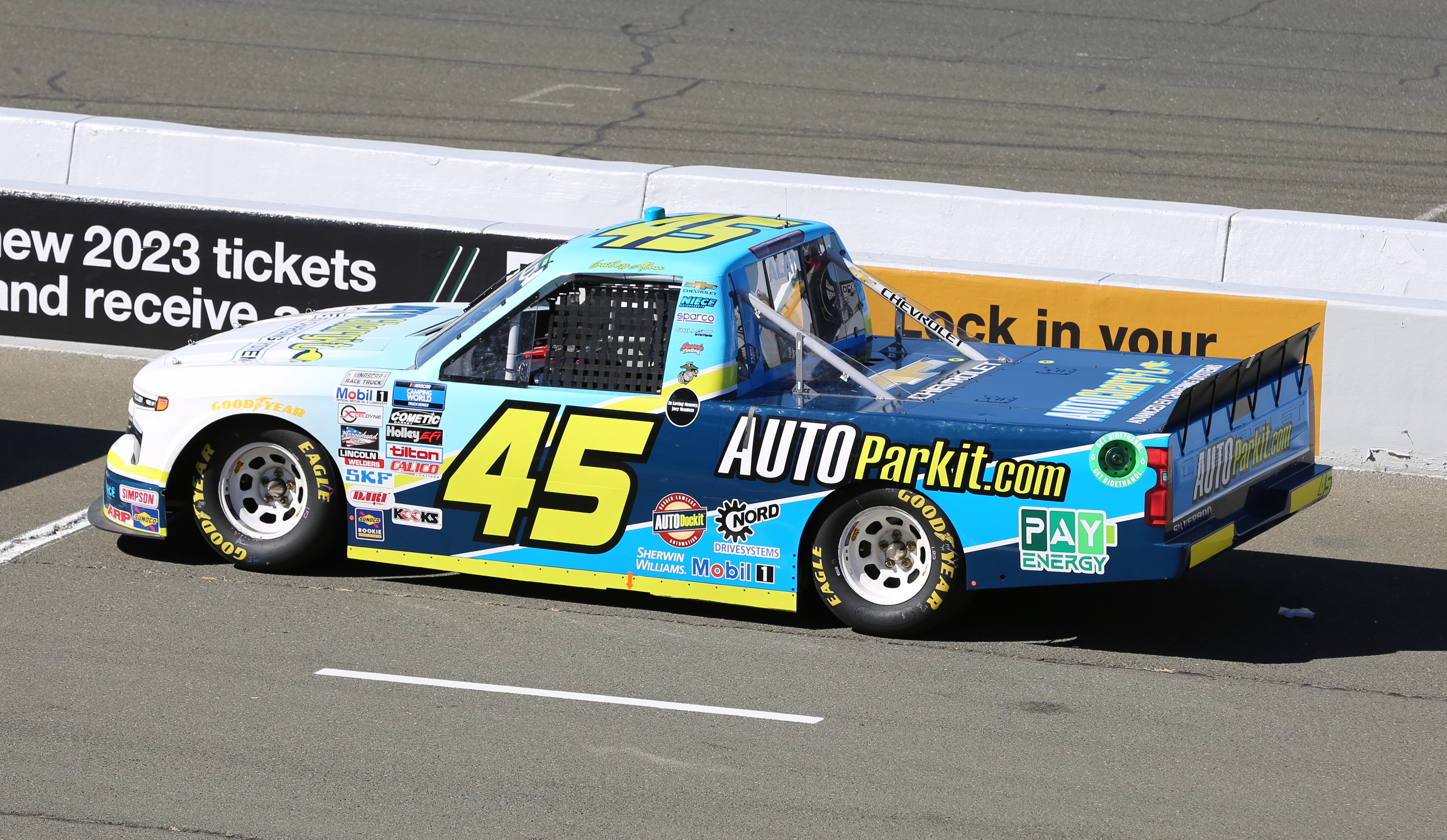
Alan's No. 45 truck at Sonoma Raceway in 2022

In 2022, Alan committed to the full Truck Series schedule in the No. 45 for Niece. He went on to finish 22nd in the final points standings after finishing in the top-twenty eight times.

Alan returned to Niece full-time in 2023 but failed to qualify for the season opener at Daytona and struggled to remain consistent. He scored a career-best tenth-place finish at Talladega, which was also his first top-ten finish in the series. He would once again finish 22nd in the point standings and would depart from the team at the conclusion of the season.

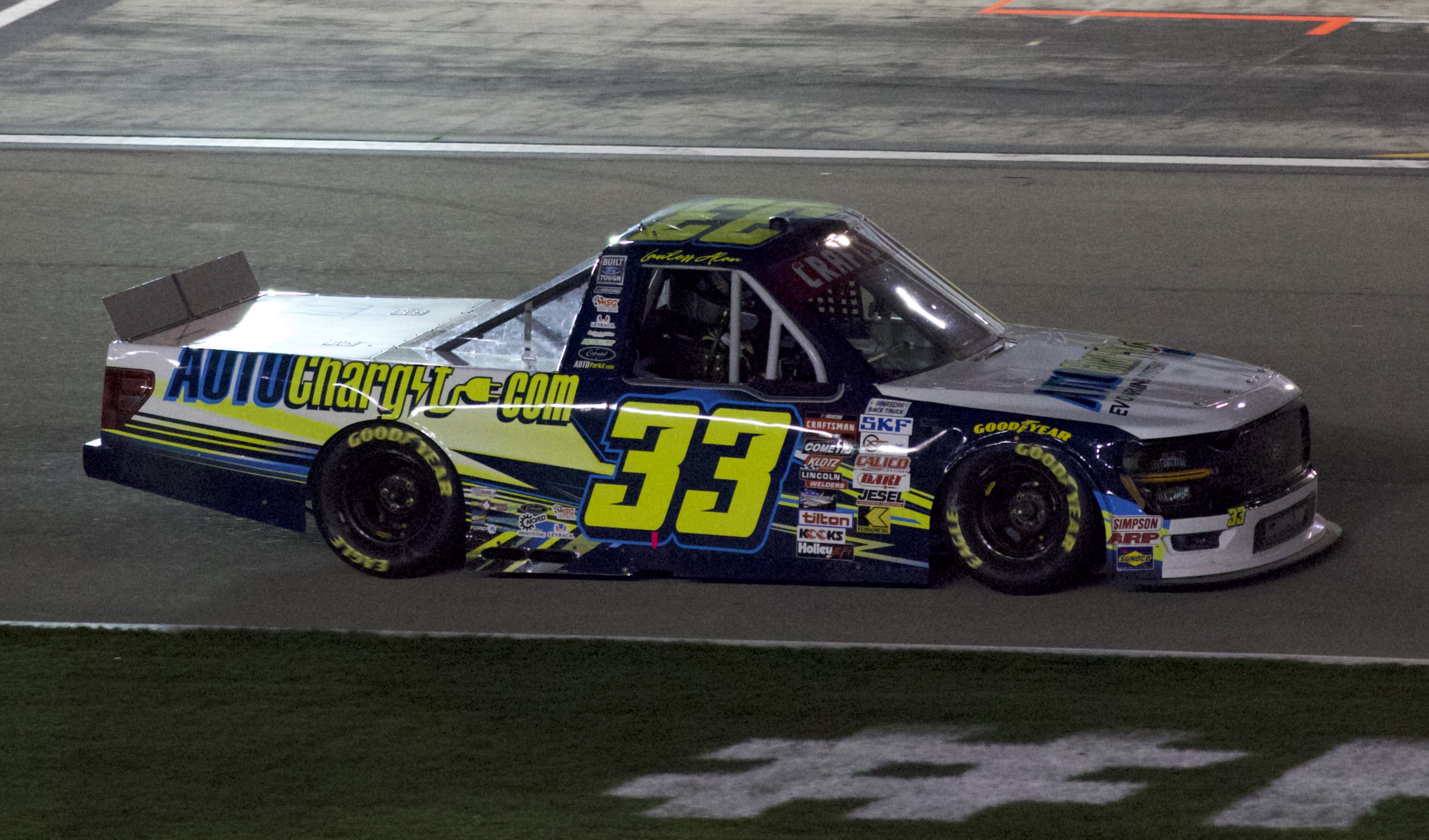
Alan's No. 33 truck at Las Vegas Motor Speedway in 2024.

In 2024, it was announced that Alan would switch to Reaume Brothers Racing in the No. 33 Ford. At Talladega, Alan would put up a strong race, running towards the front and even contending for the win. Alan would eclipse his best career finish with a fifth-place run. This would be Alan's first career top-five. On October 22, 2024, it was announced that Frankie Muniz would replace Alan in the No. 33 for the 2025 season. On January 6, 2025, it was announced that Alan would drive part-time for Tricon Garage.

=== NASCAR Xfinity Series ===
In 2024, Alan was announced to make his NASCAR Xfinity Series debut in the No. 15 AM Racing at Michigan. He finished 35th after a multi-car accident.

== Personal life ==
Alan now resides in North Carolina, where he lives with his wife, Alexandra, where he continues to pursue stock car racing.

== Motorsports career results ==
=== Stock car career summary ===
Season	Series	Team	Races	Wins	Top 5	Top 10	Points	Position
2019	NASCAR K&N Pro Series West	Bill McAnally Racing	1	0	0	0	29	63rd
2019	NASCAR K&N Pro Series East	Bill McAnally Racing	1	0	0	1	34	36th
2020	ARCA Menards Series West	Bill McAnally Racing	4	0	0	2	137	15th
2020	ARCA Menards Series	Bill McAnally Racing	1	0	0	1	35	58th
2021	NASCAR Camping World Truck Series	Reaume Brothers Racing	5	0	0	0	71	44th
2021	NASCAR Camping World Truck Series	Niece Motorsports	4	0	0	0	71	44th
2022	NASCAR Camping World Truck Series	Niece Motorsports	23	0	0	0	294	22nd
2023	NASCAR Craftsman Truck Series	Niece Motorsports	21	0	0	1	317	22nd
2024	ARCA Menards Series East	Reaume Brothers Racing	3	0	1	2	95	24th
2024	ARCA Menards Series	Reaume Brothers Racing	6	0	1	3	192	22nd
2024	NASCAR Craftsman Truck Series	Reaume Brothers Racing	23	0	1	1	306	24th
2024	NASCAR Xfinity Series	AM Racing	2	0	0	0	0	NC†
2025	ARCA Menards Series West	Venturini Motorsports	1	0	1	1	40	43rd
2025	ARCA Menards Series East	Venturini Motorsports	3	0	2	2	116	20th
2025	ARCA Menards Series	Venturini Motorsports	15	1	10	10	744	5th
2025	NASCAR Craftsman Truck Series	Tricon Garage	2	0	0	1	40	41st

^{†} As Alan was a guest driver, he was ineligible for championship points.

=== NASCAR ===
(key) (Bold – Pole position awarded by qualifying time. Italics – Pole position earned by points standings or practice time. * – Most laps led.)

==== Xfinity Series ====
NASCAR Xfinity Series results
Year	Team	No.	Make	1	2	3	4	5	6	7	8	9	10	11	12	13	14	15	16	17	18	19	20	21	22	23	24	25	26	27	28	29	30	31	32	33	NXSC	Pts	Ref
2024	AM Racing	15	Ford	DAY	ATL	LVS	PHO	COA	RCH	MAR	TEX	TAL	DOV	DAR	CLT	PIR	SON	IOW	NHA	NSH	CSC	POC	IND	MCH; 35	DAY	DAR	ATL; 13	GLN	BRI	KAN	TAL	ROV	LVS	HOM	MAR	PHO	95th	0^{1}	

==== Craftsman Truck Series ====
NASCAR Craftsman Truck Series results
Year	Team	No.	Make	1	2	3	4	5	6	7	8	9	10	11	12	13	14	15	16	17	18	19	20	21	22	23	24	25	NCTC	Pts	Ref
2021	Reaume Brothers Racing	34	Toyota	DAY	DRC; 36	LVS	ATL	BRD	RCH	KAN	DAR	COA; 23	CLT	TEX	NSH; 34	POC; 20	KNX	GLN; 32	GTW										44th	71	
2021	Niece Motorsports	45	Chevy																	DAR; 27	BRI; 18	LVS	TAL; 38	MAR	PHO; 36				44th	71	
2022	Niece Motorsports	45	Chevy	DAY; 25	LVS; 19	ATL; 33	COA; 11	MAR; 20	BRD; 30	DAR; 20	KAN; 19	TEX; 30	CLT; 22	GTW; 18	SON; 25	KNX; 18	NSH; 24	MOH; 24	POC; 22	IRP; 34	RCH; 24	KAN; 31	BRI; 23	TAL; 33	HOM; 34	PHO; 18			22nd	294	
2023	Niece Motorsports	45	Chevy	DAY; DNQ	LVS; 20	ATL; 32	COA; 17	TEX; 18	BRD; DNQ	MAR; 32	KAN; 17	DAR; 30	NWS; 19	CLT; 17	GTW; 22	NSH; 36	MOH; 17	POC; 27	RCH; 28	IRP; 24	MLW; 21	KAN; 22	BRI; 28	TAL; 10	HOM; 19	PHO; 13			22nd	317	
2024	Reaume Brothers Racing	33	Ford	DAY; 32	ATL; 12	LVS; 23	BRI; 27	COA; 33	MAR; 31	TEX; 11	KAN; 26	DAR; 12	NWS; 30	CLT; 30	GTW; 19	NSH; 24	POC; 32	IRP; 28	RCH; 18	MLW; 35	BRI; 24	KAN; 30	TAL; 5	HOM; 21	MAR; 23	PHO; 30			24th	306	
2025	Tricon Garage	1	Toyota	DAY	ATL	LVS	HOM	MAR; 10	BRI	CAR	TEX	KAN	NWS	CLT	NSH	MCH; 28	POC	LRP	IRP	GLN	RCH	DAR	BRI	NHA	ROV	TAL	MAR	PHO	41st	40	

^{*} Season in progress
^{1} Ineligible for series points

=== ARCA Menards Series ===
(key) (Bold – Pole position awarded by qualifying time. Italics – Pole position earned by points standings or practice time. * – Most laps led.)

ARCA Menards Series results
Year	Team	No.	Make	1	2	3	4	5	6	7	8	9	10	11	12	13	14	15	16	17	18	19	20	AMSC	Pts	Ref
2020	Bill McAnally Racing	12W	Toyota	DAY	PHO; 9	TAL	POC	IRP	KEN	IOW	KAN	TOL	TOL	MCH	DRC	GTW	L44	TOL	BRI	WIN	MEM	ISF	KAN	58th	35	
2024	Reaume Brothers Racing	33	Ford	DAY	PHO	TAL	DOV	KAN; 11	CLT; 8	IOW	MOH	BLN	IRP; 23	SLM	ELK	MCH	ISF	MLW; 5	DSF	GLN	BRI; 9	KAN; 8	TOL	22nd	192	
2025	Venturini Motorsports	20	Toyota	DAY; 18	PHO; 4	TAL; 1*	**KAN**; 4	CLT; 13	MCH; 3	BLN; 3	ELK; 3	LRP; 3	DOV; 12	IRP; 2	IOW; 3	GLN; 12	ISF; 20	MAD; 18	**DSF**; 2	BRI	SLM	KAN	TOL	5th	744	

==== ARCA Menards Series East ====
ARCA Menards Series East results
Year	Team	No.	Make	1	2	3	4	5	6	7	8	9	10	11	12	AMSEC	Pts	Ref
2019	Bill McAnally Racing	12	Toyota	NSM	BRI	SBO	SBO	MEM	NHA; 10	IOW	GLN	BRI	GTW	NHA	DOV	36th	34	
2024	Reaume Brothers Racing	33	Ford	FIF	DOV	NSV	FRS	IOW	IRP; 23	MLW; 5	BRI; 9					24th	95	
2025	Venturini Motorsports	20	Toyota	FIF	CAR	NSV	FRS	DOV; 12	IRP; 2	IOW; 3	BRI					20th	116	

==== ARCA Menards Series West ====
ARCA Menards Series West results
Year	Team	No.	Make	1	2	3	4	5	6	7	8	9	10	11	12	13	14	AMSWC	Pts	Ref
2019	Bill McAnally Racing	12	Toyota	LVS	IRW	TUS	TUS	CNS	SON; 24	DCS	IOW	EVG	GTW	MER	AAS	KCR	PHO	63rd	29	
2020	Bill McAnally Racing	12	Toyota	LVS; 6	MMP; 12	MMP; 12	IRW; 9	EVG	DCS	CNS	LVS	AAS	KCR	PHO				15th	137	
2025	Venturini Motorsports	20	Toyota	KER	PHO; 4	TUC	CNS	KER	SON	TRI	PIR	AAS	MAD	LVS	PHO			43rd	40	
