= 2024 CRC Brakleen 175 =

14th race of the 2024 NASCAR Craftsman Truck Series

Race details
- Race 14 of 23 of the 2024 NASCAR Craftsman Truck Series
- Date: July 12, 2024
- Official name: 15th Annual CRC Brakleen 175
- Location: Pocono Raceway in Long Pond, Pennsylvania
- Course: Permanent racing facility
- Course length: 2.5 miles (4.0 km)
- Distance: 70 laps, 175 mi (281 km)
- Scheduled distance: 70 laps, 175 mi (281 km)
- Average speed: 113.269 mph (182.289 km/h)

Pole position
Driver	Christian Eckes	McAnally-Hilgemann Racing
- Grid positions set by competition-based formula

Most laps led
Driver	Corey Heim	Tricon Garage
- Laps: 55

Winner
No. 11	Corey Heim	Tricon Garage

Television in the United States
- Network: FS1
- Announcers: Jamie Little, Phil Parsons, and Michael Waltrip

Radio in the United States
- Radio: MRN

The 2024 CRC Brakleen 175 was the 14th stock car race of the 2024 NASCAR Craftsman Truck Series, and the 15th iteration of the event. The race was held on Friday, July 12, 2024, at Pocono Raceway in Long Pond, Pennsylvania, a 2.5 miles (4.0 km) permanent triangular-shaped racetrack. The race took the scheduled 70 laps to complete. Corey Heim, driving for Tricon Garage, would put on another dominating performance in the Truck Series, winning both stages and leading a race-high 55 laps to earn his 10th career NASCAR Craftsman Truck Series win, and his fifth of the season. Christian Eckes started on the pole after qualifying was rained out, he finished 2nd in both stages and led 11 laps to finish 3rd. To fill out the podium, Grant Enfinger, driving for CR7 Motorsports, would finish in 2nd, respectively.

== Report ==
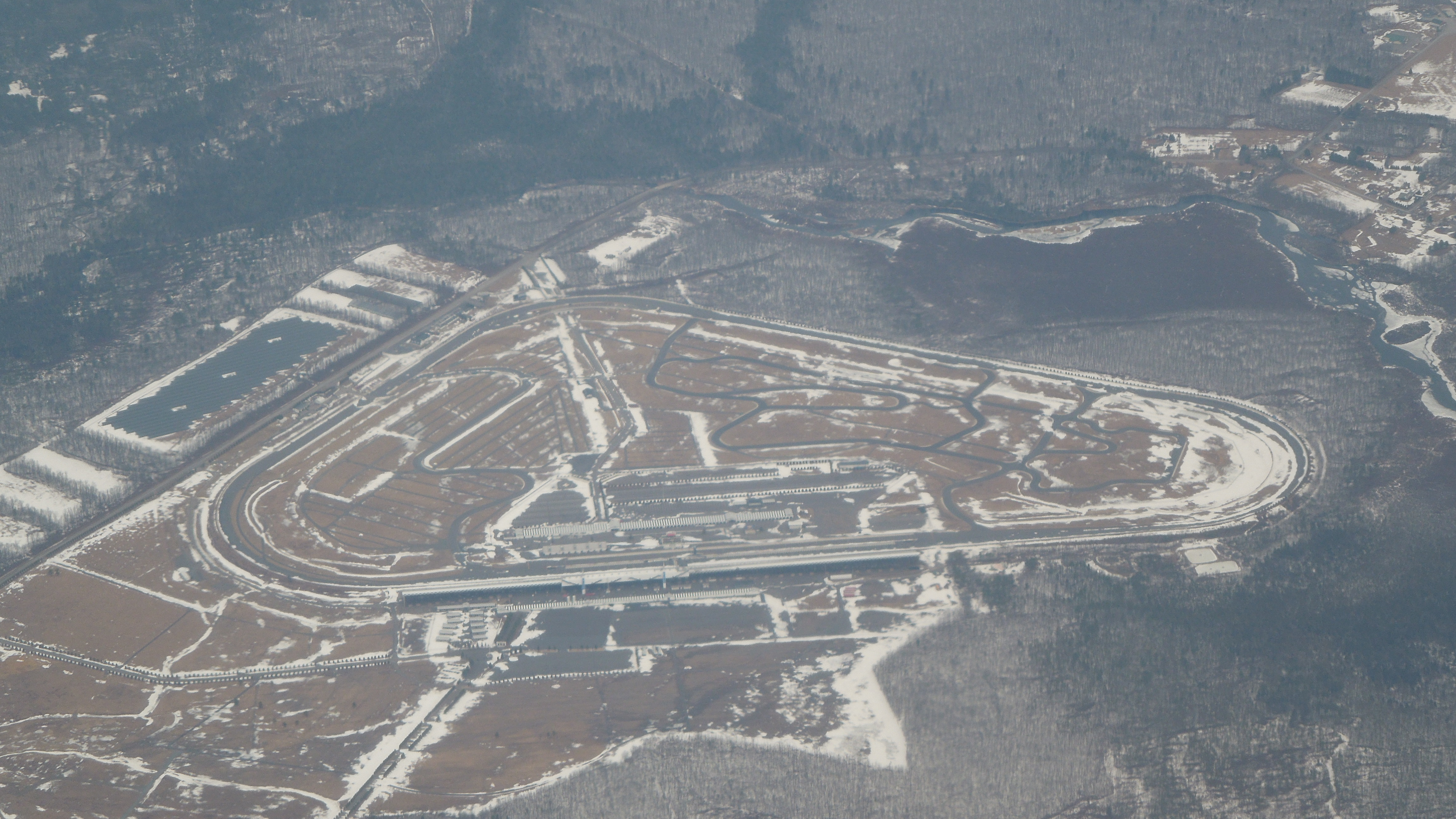
Pocono Raceway, the circuit where the race was held.

=== Background ===
Pocono Raceway is a 2.5-mile (4.0 km) oval speedway located in Long Pond, Pennsylvania, which has hosted NASCAR racing annually since the early 1970s. Nicknamed "The Tricky Triangle", the speedway has three distinct corners and is known for high speeds along its lengthy straightaways.

From 1982 to 2019, the circuit had two race weekends. In 2020, the circuit was reduced to one race meeting of two races. The first race was moved to World Wide Technology Raceway near St. Louis starting in 2022.

==== Entry list ====
- (R) denotes rookie driver.
- (i) denotes driver who is ineligible for series driver points.

#	Driver	Team	Make
1	Kris Wright	Tricon Garage	Toyota
02	Mason Massey	Young's Motorsports	Chevrolet
2	Nick Sanchez	Rev Racing	Chevrolet
5	Dean Thompson	Tricon Garage	Toyota
7	Connor Mosack	Spire Motorsports	Chevrolet
9	Grant Enfinger	CR7 Motorsports	Chevrolet
11	Corey Heim	Tricon Garage	Toyota
13	Jake Garcia	ThorSport Racing	Ford
15	Tanner Gray	Tricon Garage	Toyota
17	Taylor Gray	Tricon Garage	Toyota
18	Tyler Ankrum	McAnally-Hilgemann Racing	Chevrolet
19	Christian Eckes	McAnally-Hilgemann Racing	Chevrolet
21	Sage Karam (i)	Floridian Motorsports	Ford
22	Mason Maggio	Reaume Brothers Racing	Ford
25	Ty Dillon	Rackley WAR	Chevrolet
27	Stephen Mallozzi (i)	Reaume Brothers Racing	Ford
28	Bryan Dauzat	FDNY Racing	Chevrolet
32	Bret Holmes	Bret Holmes Racing	Chevrolet
33	Lawless Alan	Reaume Brothers Racing	Ford
38	Layne Riggs (R)	Front Row Motorsports	Ford
41	Bayley Currey	Niece Motorsports	Chevrolet
42	Matt Mills	Niece Motorsports	Chevrolet
43	Daniel Dye	McAnally-Hilgemann Racing	Chevrolet
45	Ross Chastain (i)	Niece Motorsports	Chevrolet
46	Thad Moffitt (R)	Young's Motorsports	Chevrolet
52	Stewart Friesen	Halmar Friesen Racing	Toyota
56	Timmy Hill	Hill Motorsports	Toyota
66	Luke Fenhaus	ThorSport Racing	Ford
71	Rajah Caruth	Spire Motorsports	Chevrolet
76	Spencer Boyd	Freedom Racing Enterprises	Chevrolet
77	Chase Purdy	Spire Motorsports	Chevrolet
88	Matt Crafton	ThorSport Racing	Ford
90	Justin Carroll	TC Motorsports	Toyota
91	Zane Smith (i)	McAnally-Hilgemann Racing	Chevrolet
98	Ty Majeski	ThorSport Racing	Ford
99	Ben Rhodes	ThorSport Racing	Ford
Official entry list

== Practice ==
The first and only practice session was held on Friday, July 12, at 2:25 PM EST, and would last for 20 minutes. Christian Eckes, driving for McAnally-Hilgemann Racing, would set the fastest time in the session, with a lap of 54.316, and a speed of 165.697 mph (266.663 km/h).

Pos.	#	Driver	Team	Make	Time	Speed
1	19	Christian Eckes	McAnally-Hilgemann Racing	Chevrolet	54.316	165.697
2	11	Corey Heim	Tricon Garage	Toyota	54.321	165.982
3	9	Grant Enfinger	CR7 Motorsports	Chevrolet	54.335	165.639
Full practice results

== Starting lineup ==
Qualifying was originally scheduled to be held on Friday, July 12, at 2:30 PM EST.

Pocono Raceway is the only oval in the Truck Series with a road course-style rule. While the system is a single-truck system with only one lap, drivers will exit pit lane and run down the Long Pond Straight into Turn 2 before starting their timed lap at the exit to post a qualifying time, and whoever sets the fastest time in that round will win the pole.

Qualifying was cancelled due to inclement weather, with the starting lineup based on the pandemic formula. As a result, Christian Eckes, driving for McAnally-Hilgemann Racing, would start on the pole.

No drivers would fail to qualify.

=== Starting lineup ===
Pos.	#	Driver	Team	Make
1	19	Christian Eckes	McAnally-Hilgemann Racing	Chevrolet
2	11	Corey Heim	Tricon Garage	Toyota
3	71	Rajah Caruth	Spire Motorsports	Chevrolet
4	18	Tyler Ankrum	McAnally-Hilgemann Racing	Chevrolet
5	43	Daniel Dye	McAnally-Hilgemann Racing	Chevrolet
6	98	Ty Majeski	ThorSport Racing	Ford
7	99	Ben Rhodes	ThorSport Racing	Ford
8	9	Grant Enfinger	CR7 Motorsports	Chevrolet
9	2	Nick Sanchez	Rev Racing	Chevrolet
10	52	Stewart Friesen	Halmar Friesen Racing	Toyota
11	15	Tanner Gray	Tricon Garage	Toyota
12	13	Jake Garcia	ThorSport Racing	Ford
13	42	Matt Mills	Niece Motorsports	Chevrolet
14	25	Ty Dillon	Rackley WAR	Chevrolet
15	88	Matt Crafton	ThorSport Racing	Ford
16	77	Chase Purdy	Spire Motorsports	Chevrolet
17	38	Layne Riggs (R)	Front Row Motorsports	Ford
18	7	Connor Mosack	Spire Motorsports	Chevrolet
19	17	Taylor Gray	Tricon Garage	Toyota
20	41	Bayley Currey	Niece Motorsports	Chevrolet
21	91	Zane Smith (i)	McAnally-Hilgemann Racing	Chevrolet
22	5	Dean Thompson	Tricon Garage	Toyota
23	76	Spencer Boyd	Freedom Racing Enterprises	Chevrolet
24	33	Lawless Alan	Reaume Brothers Racing	Ford
25	56	Timmy Hill	Hill Motorsports	Toyota
26	1	Kris Wright	Tricon Garage	Toyota
27	45	Ross Chastain (i)	Niece Motorsports	Chevrolet
28	66	Luke Fenhaus	ThorSport Racing	Ford
29	02	Mason Massey	Young's Motorsports	Chevrolet
30	32	Bret Holmes	Bret Holmes Racing	Chevrolet
31	46	Thad Moffitt (R)	Young's Motorsports	Chevrolet
32	22	Mason Maggio	Reaume Brothers Racing	Ford
33	21	Sage Karam (i)	Floridian Motorsports	Ford
34	28	Bryan Dauzat	FDNY Racing	Chevrolet
35	27	Stephen Mallozzi (i)	Reaume Brothers Racing	Ford
36	90	Justin Carroll	TC Motorsports	Toyota
Official starting lineup

== Race results ==
Stage 1 Laps: 15

Pos.	#	Driver	Team	Make	Pts
1	11	Corey Heim	Tricon Garage	Toyota	10
2	19	Christian Eckes	McAnally-Hilgemann Racing	Chevrolet	9
3	18	Tyler Ankrum	McAnally-Hilgemann Racing	Chevrolet	8
4	43	Daniel Dye	McAnally-Hilgemann Racing	Chevrolet	7
5	9	Grant Enfinger	CR7 Motorsports	Chevrolet	6
6	98	Ty Majeski	ThorSport Racing	Ford	5
7	2	Nick Sanchez	Rev Racing	Chevrolet	4
8	17	Taylor Gray	Tricon Garage	Toyota	3
9	52	Stewart Friesen	Halmar Friesen Racing	Toyota	2
10	15	Tanner Gray	Tricon Garage	Toyota	1

Stage 2 Laps: 15

Pos.	#	Driver	Team	Make	Pts
1	11	Corey Heim	Tricon Garage	Toyota	10
2	19	Christian Eckes	McAnally-Hilgemann Racing	Chevrolet	9
3	43	Daniel Dye	McAnally-Hilgemann Racing	Chevrolet	8
4	9	Grant Enfinger	CR7 Motorsports	Chevrolet	7
5	18	Tyler Ankrum	McAnally-Hilgemann Racing	Chevrolet	6
6	98	Ty Majeski	ThorSport Racing	Ford	5
7	45	Ross Chastain (i)	Niece Motorsports	Chevrolet	0
8	52	Stewart Friesen	Halmar Friesen Racing	Toyota	3
9	15	Tanner Gray	Tricon Garage	Toyota	2
10	42	Matt Mills	Niece Motorsports	Chevrolet	1

Stage 3 Laps: 30

Pos.	St.	#	Driver	Team	Make	Laps	Led	Status	Pts
1	2	11	Corey Heim	Tricon Garage	Toyota	70	55	Running	60
2	8	9	Grant Enfinger	CR7 Motorsports	Chevrolet	70	0	Running	48
3	1	19	Christian Eckes	McAnally-Hilgemann Racing	Chevrolet	70	11	Running	52
4	19	17	Taylor Gray	Tricon Garage	Toyota	70	0	Running	36
5	27	45	Ross Chastain (i)	Niece Motorsports	Chevrolet	70	0	Running	0
6	16	77	Chase Purdy	Spire Motorsports	Chevrolet	70	0	Running	31
7	10	52	Stewart Friesen	Halmar Friesen Racing	Toyota	70	0	Running	35
8	15	88	Matt Crafton	ThorSport Racing	Ford	70	0	Running	29
9	22	5	Dean Thompson	Tricon Garage	Toyota	70	0	Running	28
10	3	71	Rajah Caruth	Spire Motorsports	Chevrolet	70	0	Running	27
11	13	42	Matt Mills	Niece Motorsports	Chevrolet	70	0	Running	27
12	30	32	Bret Holmes	Bret Holmes Racing	Chevrolet	70	0	Running	25
13	9	2	Nick Sanchez	Rev Racing	Chevrolet	70	0	Running	28
14	4	18	Tyler Ankrum	McAnally-Hilgemann Racing	Chevrolet	70	0	Running	37
15	18	7	Connor Mosack	Spire Motorsports	Chevrolet	70	0	Running	22
16	5	43	Daniel Dye	McAnally-Hilgemann Racing	Chevrolet	70	0	Running	36
17	20	41	Bayley Currey	Niece Motorsports	Chevrolet	70	0	Running	20
18	7	99	Ben Rhodes	ThorSport Racing	Ford	70	0	Running	19
19	11	15	Tanner Gray	Tricon Garage	Toyota	70	0	Running	21
20	21	91	Zane Smith (i)	McAnally-Hilgemann Racing	Chevrolet	70	0	Running	0
21	12	13	Jake Garcia	ThorSport Racing	Ford	70	4	Running	16
22	28	66	Luke Fenhaus	ThorSport Racing	Ford	70	0	Running	15
23	25	56	Timmy Hill	Hill Motorsports	Toyota	70	0	Running	14
24	29	02	Mason Massey	Young's Motorsports	Chevrolet	70	0	Running	13
25	14	25	Ty Dillon	Rackley WAR	Chevrolet	70	0	Running	12
26	26	1	Kris Wright	Tricon Garage	Toyota	70	0	Running	11
27	32	22	Mason Maggio	Reaume Brothers Racing	Ford	70	0	Running	10
28	36	90	Justin Carroll	TC Motorsports	Toyota	70	0	Running	9
29	31	46	Thad Moffitt (R)	Young's Motorsports	Chevrolet	70	0	Running	8
30	17	38	Layne Riggs (R)	Front Row Motorsports	Ford	69	0	Running	7
31	6	98	Ty Majeski	ThorSport Racing	Ford	68	0	Running	16
32	24	33	Lawless Alan	Reaume Brothers Racing	Ford	68	0	Running	5
33	33	21	Sage Karam (i)	Floridian Motorsports	Ford	67	0	Running	0
34	34	28	Bryan Dauzat	FDNY Racing	Chevrolet	65	0	Running	3
35	35	27	Stephen Mallozzi (i)	Reaume Brothers Racing	Ford	22	0	Transmission	0
36	23	76	Spencer Boyd	Freedom Racing Enterprises	Chevrolet	5	0	Hub	1
Official race results

== Standings after the race ==
Drivers' Championship standings

	Pos	Driver	Points
	1	Christian Eckes	618
	2	Corey Heim	586 (-32)
	3	Nick Sanchez	505 (–113)
	4	Ty Majeski	490 (–128)
	5	Rajah Caruth	430 (–188)
	6	Tyler Ankrum	414 (–204)
2	7	Grant Enfinger	411 (–207)
1	8	Taylor Gray	404 (–214)
1	9	Ben Rhodes	383 (–235)
1	10	Daniel Dye	366 (–252)
Official driver's standings

Manufacturers' Championship standings

Pos	Manufacturer	Points
1	Chevrolet	533
2	Toyota	498 (-35)
3	Ford	442 (–91)

- Note: Only the first 10 positions are included for the driver standings.

Previous race: 2024 Rackley Roofing 200	NASCAR Craftsman Truck Series; 2024 season	Next race: 2024 TSport 200
