= Stephen Mallozzi =

American racing driver (born 2001)

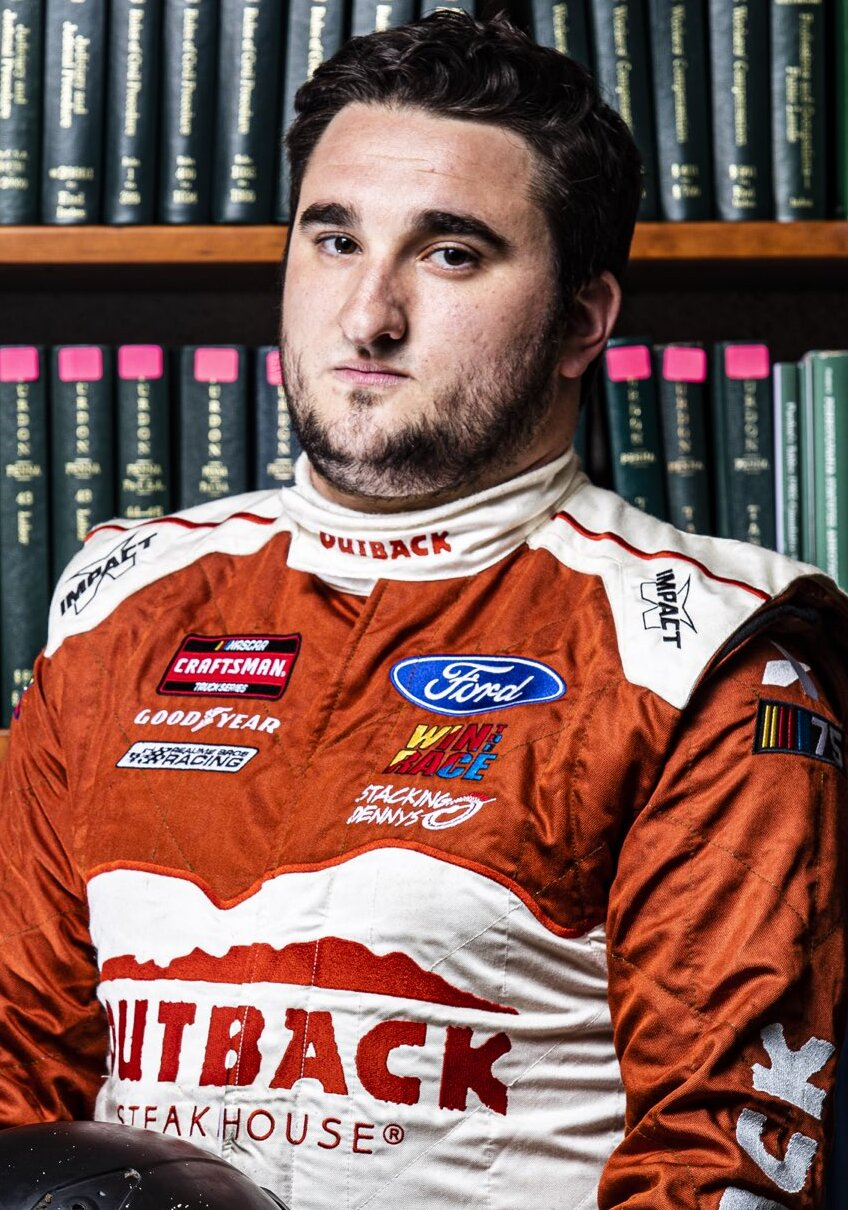
- Mallozzi in 2025
- Born: Stephen John Mallozzi; January 15, 2001 (age 25); Swedesboro, New Jersey, U.S.

NASCAR O'Reilly Auto Parts Series career
- 1 race run over 1 year
- 2024 position: 108th
- Best finish: 108th (2024)
- First race: 2024 Explore the Pocono Mountains 225 (Pocono)
Wins	Top tens	Poles
0	0	0

NASCAR FedEx Freight Truck Series career
- 16 races run over 5 years
- 2026 position: 63rd
- Best finish: 54th (2023, 2025)
- First race: 2022 O'Reilly Auto Parts 150 at Mid-Ohio (Mid-Ohio)
- Last race: 2026 RaceToStopSuicide.com 200 (Kansas)
Wins	Top tens	Poles
0	0	0
- Statistics up to date as of November 6, 2026.

Stephen John Mallozzi (born January 15, 2001) is an American professional stock car racing driver. He last competed part-time in the NASCAR Craftsman Truck Series, driving the No. 33 Ford F-150 for Team Reaume. He also competes in late model racing and has previously competed part-time in the NASCAR Xfinity Series.

Mallozzi started competing in childhood by racing go-karts at the age of nine. After winning various karting championships, he abruptly stopped racing when his father was diagnosed with terminal cancer. After spending most of his college years working in various journalism and law fields, he eventually returned to racing, citing motivation from his father. Initially joining RBR in 2021 as a development driver, he later made a one-off Truck Series start for the team the following year. He later raced in more Truck Series races in 2023 for both RBR and AM Racing.

== Early life ==
=== Early racing career ===
Mallozzi was born to Stephen Anthony Mallozzi (born 1971) and Melissa Marie Miller (born 1970). Mallozzi stated that he became a fan of auto racing when he was three years old, while watching auto racing on television. His interest in auto racing grew after playing NASCAR Thunder 2004, Mario Kart, and a "bunch of [other auto racing] games". Mallozzi, with assistance from his father, later went to a local go-kart track at the age of nine years old and raced his first event. By the age of eleven, he had started to race go-karts on a frequent scale.

During his karting career, Mallozzi won multiple Northeast Karting Challenge championships, which earned him a spot to race overseas in Portugal for the United States. His go-karting career lasted around five years; before a scheduled race in 2016, his father was diagnosed with terminal lung cancer, with his father only given six months to live. As a result of the diagnosis, Mallozzi decided to step away from auto racing.

=== Transition to journalism ===
After stepping away from auto racing, Mallozzi transitioned to a journalism and broadcasting career. After graduating from Salesianum High School in 2019, he originally intended to join Rutgers University due to transport conflicts with the University of Virginia (UVA). However, after talking to a dean at UVA, he was persuaded to commit to Virginia in the fall of 2019, majoring in economics. While at UVA, he worked as a sports commentator for various sports programs.

== Gradual return to racing ==
Early in 2021, Mallozzi talked to his father about frustrations that he had never raced in NASCAR. His father, who at this point had lived five years with cancer, stated, "If I treated my cancer the way you treated racing, I would have been dead five fucking years ago." Self-described as a "verbal smackdown" for Mallozzi, the quote motivated him to pursue a racing career again.

In July 2021, Mallozzi and Reaume Brothers Racing (RBR) crew member Jonathan Cuevas were announced to become the first members of a new driver development program for the team. During this time, he gained a close friendship with team owner Josh Reaume, gained an internship working for RBR, and started racing late models across the Carolinas.

=== 2022–2023 ===
By 2022, Reaume let Mallozzi drive an entry at the 2022 O'Reilly Auto Parts 150 at Mid-Ohio, with Mallozzi driving the team's No. 43 entry. According to Mallozzi, the effort made to get to the track itself was strenuous; he crowdfunded a Facebook group, asked former sponsors to sponsor him for the race, and asked numerous personal friends to be spotters for the race. During the race weekend itself, Mallozzi was involved in a practice accident with G2G Racing's Mason Filippi. While the damage wasn't extensive, Mallozzi expressed frustration at G2G Racing, stating, "[G2G Racing] is the biggest joke of a racing organization in NASCAR... I will stand by that statement publicly to anyone." Mallozzi's car was eventually repaired and allowed to qualify, with Mallozzi finishing in 22nd in the race itself.

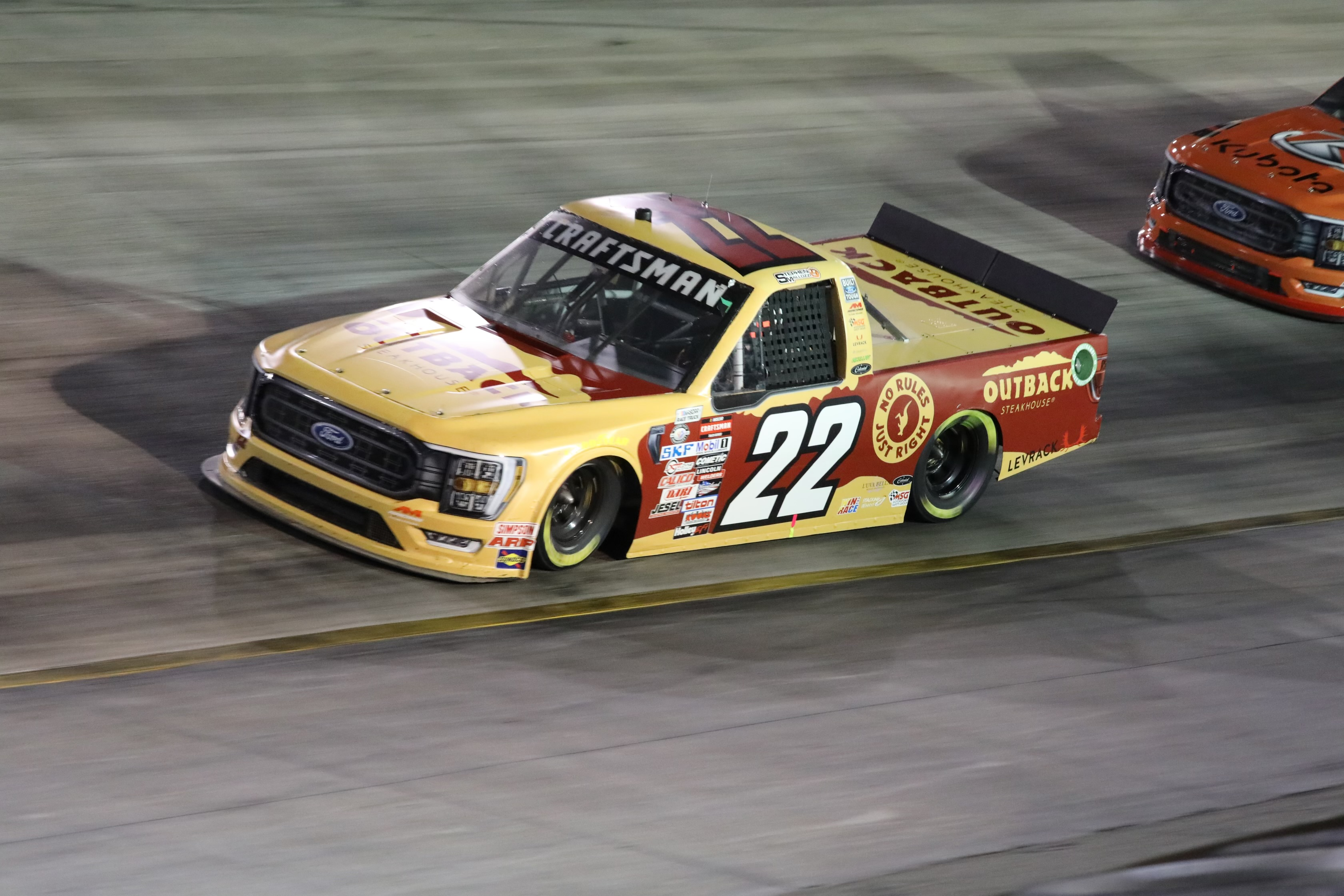
Mallozzi on track at Bristol in 2023

Mallozzi was able to compete in more races in the 2023 season. The season, according to Mallozzi, was precarious. His debut for the season came at Martinsville for AM Racing, in a deal where he was moved from an initial ride from RBR due to a lack of owner's points for RBR's entry. He finished last after the car's battery suffered issues. His next race came at Gateway for RBR; he described the race as "my version of hell", due to the circumstances of both heading into the race and the race itself. He sold his personal Dodge Charger that he had gotten from a sponsorship deal to get to the race itself and during the race, his battery failed, resulting in a poor finish. Around this same time, he was working as a part-time server at a Outback Steakhouse franchise; after the Martinsville race, he made calls on social media platforms for Outback Steakhouse to sponsor an entry for him. After racing one more event for AM Racing at Pocono, a one-race sponsorship deal was announced with Outback Steakhouse in September, with the sponsor to run at the 2023 UNOH 200.

=== 2024–2026 ===
Mallozzi continued making starts in the Truck Series in 2024, racing in Martinsville and Pocono. Mallozzi also made his first start in the NASCAR Xfinity Series within the year at Pocono, finishing in 35th in his debut. In the following season, he maintained a part-time role for Reaume, starting-and-parking in all of his entries for the team; he later stated in an interview for The Philadelphia Inquirer that the occurrence of start-and-parking that season was the "biggest challenge behind being competitive and trying to not sacrifice professionally". In 2026, with no racing plans announced, Mallozzi began pitching on social media to Ram Trucks' racing division, which had opened up a NASCAR Truck Series program that year, for a one-race deal in the team's "Free Agent Program". He later described the Free Agent Program as a "very slim opportunity", but it had provided a "1% sliver of hope to do what I’ve always thought I could do in a way that would be fit for Hollywood".

== Personal life ==
Mallozzi is the child of Stephen Anthony Mallozzi and Melissa Marie Miller. Mallozzi cites Stephen as the main motivator for both his initial start in racing and his return.

Mallozzi attended Salesianum High School, a Catholic private school based in Wilmington, Delaware. He later attended the University of Virginia, majoring in economics and graduating in 2022. He currently attends the Temple University Beasley School of Law, with Mallozzi scheduled to graduate in 2026. Mallozzi currently resides in Philadelphia after previously living in Mooresville, North Carolina to study at Temple. Before Mooresville, he had lived in his hometown of Swedesboro, New Jersey, moving from Swedesboro in 2021.

Mallozzi currently works part-time as a server at an Outback Steakhouse franchise. He previously had worked at a Domino's franchise as a delivery driver; he was fired for having too many speeding tickets off the job. He also is an occasional writer for NASCAR news site TobyChristie.com, serving as the site's eSports journalist. Mallozzi has also used his writing position at TobyChristie.com to detail his racing career; he has stated on occasions that he believes to be "one of the poorest drivers in the entire Truck Series", stating the amount he has sacrificed in order to pursue a racing career compared to well-funded drivers in the series.

== Motorsports career results ==
=== NASCAR ===
(key) (Bold – Pole position awarded by qualifying time. Italics – Pole position earned by points standings or practice time. * – Most laps led.)

==== Xfinity Series ====
NASCAR Xfinity Series results
Year	Team	No.	Make	1	2	3	4	5	6	7	8	9	10	11	12	13	14	15	16	17	18	19	20	21	22	23	24	25	26	27	28	29	30	31	32	33	NXSC	Pts	Ref
2024	Joey Gase Motorsports	35	Chevy	DAY	ATL	LVS	PHO	COA	RCH	MAR	TEX	TAL	DOV	DAR	CLT	PIR	SON	IOW	NHA	NSH	CSC	POC; 35	IND	MCH	DAY	DAR	ATL	GLN	BRI	KAN	TAL	ROV	LVS	HOM	MAR	PHO	108th	0^{1}	

==== Craftsman Truck Series ====
NASCAR Craftsman Truck Series results
Year	Team	No.	Make	1	2	3	4	5	6	7	8	9	10	11	12	13	14	15	16	17	18	19	20	21	22	23	24	25	NCTC	Pts	Ref
2022	Reaume Brothers Racing	43	Toyota	DAY	LVS	ATL	COA	MAR	BRD	DAR	KAN	TEX	CLT	GTW	SON	KNX	NSH	MOH; 22	POC	IRP	RCH	KAN	BRI	TAL	HOM	PHO			61st	15	
2023	AM Racing	22	Ford	DAY	LVS	ATL	COA	TEX	BRD	MAR; 36	KAN	DAR	NWS	CLT				POC; 24	RCH	IRP	MLW	KAN	BRI; 32	TAL	HOM	PHO			54th	25	
2023	Reaume Brothers Racing	34	Ford												GTW; 31	NSH	MOH												54th	25	
2024	Reaume Brothers Racing	22	Ford	DAY	ATL	LVS	BRI	COA	MAR; 28	TEX	KAN	DAR	NWS	CLT	GTW	NSH													67th	11	
2024	Reaume Brothers Racing	27	Ford														POC; 35	IRP	RCH	MLW	BRI	KAN	TAL	HOM	MAR	PHO			67th	11	
2025	Reaume Brothers Racing	2	Ford	DAY	ATL	LVS; 31	HOM; 34	MAR	BRI; 35	CAR; 33	TEX	KAN	NWS	CLT	NSH	MCH	POC	LRP	IRP	GLN		DAR; 31	BRI	NHA; 35	ROV	TAL	MAR	PHO	54th	26	
2025	Reaume Brothers Racing	22	Ford																		RCH; 34								54th	26	
2026	Team Reaume	33	Ford	DAY	ATL	STP	DAR	CAR	BRI	TEX	GLN; 22	DOV	CLT	NSH	MCH	COR	LRP	NWS	IRP	RCH	NHA	BRI							63rd	25	
2026	Team Reaume	2	Ford																				KAN; 27	CLT	PHO	TAL	MAR	HOM	63rd	25	

^{*} Season still in progress
^{1} Ineligible for series points
