= 2023 UNOH 200 =

20th race of the 2023 NASCAR Craftsman Truck Series

2023 UNOH 200 presented by Ohio Logistics
Race details
- Race 20 of 23 of the 2023 NASCAR Craftsman Truck Series
- Date: September 14, 2023
- Official name: 26th Annual UNOH 200 presented by Ohio Logistics
- Location: Bristol Motor Speedway, Bristol, Tennessee
- Course: Permanent racing facility
- Course length: 0.533 miles (0.858 km)
- Distance: 200 laps, 106 mi (171 km)
- Scheduled distance: 200 laps, 106 mi (171 km)
- Average speed: 84.047 mph (135.261 km/h)

Pole position
Driver	Christian Eckes	McAnally-Hilgemann Racing
- Time: 15.101

Most laps led
Driver	Christian Eckes	McAnally-Hilgemann Racing
- Laps: 150

Winner
No. 11	Corey Heim	Tricon Garage

Television in the United States
- Network: FS1
- Announcers: Adam Alexander, Phil Parsons, and Michael Waltrip

Radio in the United States
- Radio: MRN

The 2023 UNOH 200 presented by Ohio Logistics was the 20th stock car race of the 2023 NASCAR Craftsman Truck Series, the first race of the Round of 8, and the 26th iteration of the event. The race was held on Thursday, September 14, 2023, in Bristol, Tennessee at Bristol Motor Speedway, a 0.533 miles (0.858 km) permanent oval shaped racetrack. The race took the scheduled 200 laps to complete. Corey Heim, driving for Tricon Garage, would make a late-race pass on Christian Eckes for lead with five laps to go, and held him off to earn his fifth career NASCAR Craftsman Truck Series win, and his third of the season. He would also earn a spot in the Championship 4. Eckes had dominated the entire race, winning both stages and leading a race-high 150 laps. To fill out the podium, Eckes, driving for McAnally-Hilgemann Racing, and Grant Enfinger, driving for GMS Racing, would finish 2nd and 3rd, respectively.

== Background ==
The Bristol Motor Speedway, formerly known as Bristol International Raceway and Bristol Raceway, is a NASCAR short track venue located in Bristol, Tennessee. Constructed in 1960, it held its first NASCAR race on July 30, 1961. Despite its short length, Bristol is among the most popular tracks on the NASCAR schedule because of its distinct features, which include extraordinarily steep banking, an all concrete surface, two pit roads, and stadium-like seating. It has also been named one of the loudest NASCAR tracks.

=== Entry list ===
- (R) denotes rookie driver.
- (i) denotes driver who is ineligible for series driver points.
- (P) denotes playoff driver.

#	Driver	Team	Make
1	William Sawalich	Tricon Garage	Toyota
02	Kaden Honeycutt	Young's Motorsports	Chevrolet
2	Nick Sanchez (R) (P)	Rev Racing	Chevrolet
4	Chase Purdy	Kyle Busch Motorsports	Chevrolet
5	Dean Thompson	Tricon Garage	Toyota
7	Carson Kvapil (i)	Spire Motorsports	Chevrolet
9	Colby Howard	CR7 Motorsports	Chevrolet
11	Corey Heim (P)	Tricon Garage	Toyota
12	Spencer Boyd	Young's Motorsports	Chevrolet
13	Hailie Deegan	ThorSport Racing	Ford
15	Tanner Gray	Tricon Garage	Toyota
16	Tyler Ankrum	Hattori Racing Enterprises	Toyota
17	Taylor Gray (R)	Tricon Garage	Toyota
19	Christian Eckes (P)	McAnally-Hilgemann Racing	Chevrolet
20	Greg Van Alst	Young's Motorsports	Chevrolet
22	Stephen Mallozzi	AM Racing	Ford
23	Grant Enfinger (P)	GMS Racing	Chevrolet
24	Rajah Caruth (R)	GMS Racing	Chevrolet
25	Matt DiBenedetto	Rackley WAR	Chevrolet
32	Bret Holmes (R)	Bret Holmes Racing	Chevrolet
33	Memphis Villarreal	Reaume Brothers Racing	Ford
35	Jake Garcia (R)	McAnally-Hilgemann Racing	Chevrolet
38	Zane Smith (P)	Front Row Motorsports	Ford
41	Bayley Currey	Niece Motorsports	Chevrolet
42	Carson Hocevar (P)	Niece Motorsports	Chevrolet
43	Daniel Dye (R)	GMS Racing	Chevrolet
44	Danny Bohn	Niece Motorsports	Chevrolet
45	Lawless Alan	Niece Motorsports	Chevrolet
51	Jack Wood	Kyle Busch Motorsports	Chevrolet
52	Stewart Friesen	Halmar Friesen Racing	Toyota
56	Timmy Hill	Hill Motorsports	Toyota
61	Jake Drew	Hattori Racing Enterprises	Toyota
66	Conner Jones	ThorSport Racing	Ford
75	Parker Kligerman (i)	Henderson Motorsports	Chevrolet
88	Matt Crafton	ThorSport Racing	Ford
90	Justin Carroll	TC Motorsports	Toyota
98	Ty Majeski (P)	ThorSport Racing	Ford
99	Ben Rhodes (P)	ThorSport Racing	Ford
Official entry list

== Practice ==
For practice, drivers will be separated into two groups, Group A and B. Both sessions will be 15 minutes long, and was held on Thursday, September 14, at 4:00 PM EST. Christian Eckes, driving for McAnally-Hilgemann Racing, would set the fastest time between both sessions, with a lap of 15.424, and an average speed of 124.404 mph (200.209 km/h).

Pos.	#	Driver	Team	Make	Time	Speed
1	19	Christian Eckes (P)	McAnally-Hilgemann Racing	Chevrolet	15.424	124.404
2	35	Jake Garcia (R)	McAnally-Hilgemann Racing	Chevrolet	15.466	124.066
3	99	Ben Rhodes (P)	ThorSport Racing	Ford	15.487	123.897
Full practice results

== Qualifying ==
Qualifying was held on Thursday, September 14, at 4:35 PM EST. Since Bristol Motor Speedway is a short track, the qualifying system used is a single-car, two-lap system with only one round. In that round, whoever sets the fastest time will win the pole. Christian Eckes, driving for McAnally-Hilgemann Racing, would score the pole for the race, with a lap of 15.101, and an average speed of 127.064 mph (204.490 km/h).

Pos.	#	Driver	Team	Make	Time	Speed
1	19	Christian Eckes (P)	McAnally-Hilgemann Racing	Chevrolet	15.101	127.064
2	42	Carson Hocevar (P)	Niece Motorsports	Chevrolet	15.131	126.813
3	4	Chase Purdy	Kyle Busch Motorsports	Chevrolet	15.149	126.662
4	98	Ty Majeski (P)	ThorSport Racing	Ford	15.157	126.595
5	24	Rajah Caruth (R)	GMS Racing	Chevrolet	15.186	126.353
6	15	Tanner Gray	Tricon Garage	Toyota	15.207	126.179
7	51	Jack Wood	Kyle Busch Motorsports	Chevrolet	15.222	126.054
8	17	Taylor Gray (R)	Tricon Garage	Toyota	15.229	125.996
9	1	William Sawalich	Tricon Garage	Toyota	15.240	125.906
10	38	Zane Smith (P)	Front Row Motorsports	Ford	15.250	125.823
11	11	Corey Heim (P)	Tricon Garage	Toyota	15.256	125.773
12	25	Matt DiBenedetto	Rackley WAR	Chevrolet	15.259	125.749
13	23	Grant Enfinger (P)	GMS Racing	Chevrolet	15.288	125.510
14	5	Dean Thompson	Tricon Garage	Toyota	15.294	125.461
15	61	Jake Drew	Hattori Racing Enterprises	Toyota	15.327	125.191
16	43	Daniel Dye (R)	GMS Racing	Chevrolet	15.337	125.109
17	02	Kaden Honeycutt	Young's Motorsports	Chevrolet	15.337	125.109
18	99	Ben Rhodes (P)	ThorSport Racing	Ford	15.338	125.101
19	13	Hailie Deegan	ThorSport Racing	Ford	15.363	124.897
20	66	Conner Jones	ThorSport Racing	Ford	15.392	124.662
21	88	Matt Crafton	ThorSport Racing	Ford	15.401	124.589
22	45	Lawless Alan	Niece Motorsports	Chevrolet	15.419	124.444
23	9	Colby Howard	CR7 Motorsports	Chevrolet	15.442	124.259
24	52	Stewart Friesen	Halmar Friesen Racing	Toyota	15.464	124.082
25	16	Tyler Ankrum	Hattori Racing Enterprises	Toyota	15.467	124.058
26	56	Timmy Hill	Hill Motorsports	Toyota	15.510	123.714
27	7	Carson Kvapil (i)	Spire Motorsports	Chevrolet	15.525	123.594
28	75	Parker Kligerman (i)	Henderson Motorsports	Chevrolet	15.573	123.213
29	32	Bret Holmes (R)	Bret Holmes Racing	Chevrolet	15.660	122.529
30	35	Jake Garcia (R)	McAnally-Hilgemann Racing	Chevrolet	15.671	122.443
31	12	Spencer Boyd	Young's Motorsports	Chevrolet	15.706	122.170
Qualified by owner's points
32	20	Greg Van Alst	Young's Motorsports	Chevrolet	15.829	121.221
33	33	Memphis Villarreal	Reaume Brothers Racing	Ford	15.842	121.121
34	22	Stephen Mallozzi	AM Racing	Ford	16.328	117.516
35	2	Nick Sanchez (R) (P)	Rev Racing	Chevrolet	–	–
36	41	Bayley Currey	Niece Motorsports	Chevrolet	–	–
Failed to qualify
37	90	Justin Carroll	TC Motorsports	Toyota	15.935	120.414
38	44	Danny Bohn	Niece Motorsports	Chevrolet	16.031	119.693
Official qualifying results
Official starting lineup

== Race results ==
Stage 1 Laps: 55

Pos.	#	Driver	Team	Make	Pts
1	19	Christian Eckes (P)	McAnally-Hilgemann Racing	Chevrolet	10
2	42	Carson Hocevar (P)	Niece Motorsports	Chevrolet	9
3	98	Ty Majeski (P)	ThorSport Racing	Ford	8
4	4	Chase Purdy	Kyle Busch Motorsports	Chevrolet	7
5	38	Zane Smith (P)	Front Row Motorsports	Ford	6
6	24	Rajah Caruth (R)	GMS Racing	Chevrolet	5
7	17	Taylor Gray (R)	Tricon Garage	Toyota	4
8	11	Corey Heim (P)	Tricon Garage	Toyota	3
9	15	Tanner Gray	Tricon Garage	Toyota	2
10	99	Ben Rhodes (P)	ThorSport Racing	Ford	1

Stage 2 Laps: 55

Pos.	#	Driver	Team	Make	Pts
1	19	Christian Eckes (P)	McAnally-Hilgemann Racing	Chevrolet	10
2	38	Zane Smith (P)	Front Row Motorsports	Ford	9
3	2	Nick Sanchez (R) (P)	Rev Racing	Chevrolet	8
4	11	Corey Heim (P)	Tricon Garage	Toyota	7
5	23	Grant Enfinger (P)	GMS Racing	Chevrolet	6
6	17	Taylor Gray (R)	Tricon Garage	Toyota	5
7	42	Carson Hocevar (P)	Niece Motorsports	Chevrolet	4
8	7	Carson Kvapil (i)	Spire Motorsports	Chevrolet	0
9	24	Rajah Caruth (R)	GMS Racing	Chevrolet	2
10	99	Ben Rhodes (P)	ThorSport Racing	Ford	1

Stage 3 Laps: 90

Fin	St	#	Driver	Team	Make	Laps	Led	Status	Pts
1	11	11	Corey Heim (P)	Tricon Garage	Toyota	200	6	Running	50
2	1	19	Christian Eckes (P)	McAnally-Hilgemann Racing	Chevrolet	200	150	Running	55
3	13	23	Grant Enfinger (P)	GMS Racing	Chevrolet	200	0	Running	40
4	2	42	Carson Hocevar (P)	Niece Motorsports	Chevrolet	200	0	Running	46
5	8	17	Taylor Gray (R)	Tricon Garage	Toyota	200	0	Running	41
6	5	24	Rajah Caruth (R)	GMS Racing	Chevrolet	200	0	Running	38
7	18	99	Ben Rhodes (P)	ThorSport Racing	Ford	200	0	Running	32
8	3	4	Chase Purdy	Kyle Busch Motorsports	Chevrolet	200	1	Running	36
9	35	2	Nick Sanchez (R) (P)	Rev Racing	Chevrolet	200	0	Running	36
10	12	25	Matt DiBenedetto	Rackley WAR	Chevrolet	200	0	Running	27
11	30	35	Jake Garcia (R)	McAnally-Hilgemann Racing	Chevrolet	200	0	Running	26
12	27	7	Carson Kvapil (i)	Spire Motorsports	Chevrolet	200	0	Running	0
13	36	41	Bayley Currey	Niece Motorsports	Chevrolet	200	0	Running	24
14	24	52	Stewart Friesen	Halmar Friesen Racing	Toyota	200	0	Running	23
15	20	66	Conner Jones	ThorSport Racing	Ford	200	0	Running	22
16	21	88	Matt Crafton	ThorSport Racing	Ford	200	0	Running	21
17	19	13	Hailie Deegan	ThorSport Racing	Ford	200	0	Running	20
18	28	75	Parker Kligerman (i)	Henderson Motorsports	Chevrolet	200	0	Running	0
19	4	98	Ty Majeski (P)	ThorSport Racing	Ford	200	0	Running	26
20	15	61	Jake Drew	Hattori Racing Enterprises	Toyota	200	0	Running	17
21	16	43	Daniel Dye (R)	GMS Racing	Chevrolet	199	0	Running	16
22	23	9	Colby Howard	CR7 Motorsports	Chevrolet	199	0	Running	15
23	25	16	Tyler Ankrum	Hattori Racing Enterprises	Toyota	199	0	Running	14
24	10	38	Zane Smith (P)	Front Row Motorsports	Ford	199	43	Running	28
25	17	02	Kaden Honeycutt	Young's Motorsports	Chevrolet	199	0	Running	12
26	26	56	Timmy Hill	Hill Motorsports	Toyota	199	0	Running	11
27	29	32	Bret Holmes (R)	Bret Holmes Racing	Chevrolet	199	0	Running	10
28	22	45	Lawless Alan	Niece Motorsports	Chevrolet	199	0	Running	9
29	6	15	Tanner Gray	Tricon Garage	Toyota	198	0	Running	10
30	9	1	William Sawalich	Tricon Garage	Toyota	197	0	Running	7
31	31	12	Spencer Boyd	Young's Motorsports	Chevrolet	196	0	Running	6
32	34	22	Stephen Mallozzi	AM Racing	Ford	192	0	Running	5
33	33	33	Memphis Villarreal	Reaume Brothers Racing	Ford	191	0	Running	4
34	32	20	Greg Van Alst	Young's Motorsports	Chevrolet	140	0	Brakes	3
35	14	5	Dean Thompson	Tricon Garage	Toyota	14	0	Accident	2
36	7	51	Jack Wood	Kyle Busch Motorsports	Chevrolet	13	0	Accident	1
Official race results

== Standings after the race ==
Drivers' Championship standings

	Pos	Driver	Points
	1	Corey Heim	3,080
	2	Christian Eckes	3,079 (-1)
1	3	Carson Hocevar	3,068 (-12)
1	4	Grant Enfinger	3,064 (-16)
	5	Zane Smith	3,050 (-30)
1	6	Ben Rhodes	3,045 (-35)
1	7	Nick Sanchez	3,042 (-38)
2	8	Ty Majeski	3,042 (-38)
	9	Matt DiBenedetto	2,102 (-978)
	10	Matt Crafton	2,090 (-990)
Official driver's standings

- Note: Only the first 10 positions are included for the driver standings.

Previous race: 2023 Kansas Lottery 200	NASCAR Craftsman Truck Series; 2023 season	Next race: 2023 Love's RV Stop 250
