= 2023 CRC Brakleen 150 =

15th race of the 2023 NASCAR Craftsman Truck Series

Race details
- Race 15 of 23 of the 2023 NASCAR Craftsman Truck Series
- Date: July 22, 2023
- Official name: 14th Annual CRC Brakleen 150
- Location: Pocono Raceway, Long Pond, Pennsylvania
- Course: Permanent racing facility
- Course length: 2.5 miles (4.0 km)
- Distance: 60 laps, 150 mi (241 km)
- Scheduled distance: 60 laps, 150 mi (241 km)
- Average speed: 108.434 mph (174.508 km/h)

Pole position
| Driver | Nick Sanchez | Rev Racing |
- Time: 53.265

Most laps led
| Driver | Corey Heim | Tricon Garage |
- Laps: 27

Winner
| No. 51 | Kyle Busch | Kyle Busch Motorsports |

Television in the United States
- Network: FS1
- Announcers: Adam Alexander, Phil Parsons, and Michael Waltrip

Radio in the United States
- Radio: MRN

The 2023 CRC Brakleen 150 was the 15th stock car race of the 2023 NASCAR Craftsman Truck Series, and the 14th iteration of the event. The race was held on Saturday, July 22, 2023, in Long Pond, Pennsylvania at Pocono Raceway, a 2.5 miles (4.0 km) permanent triangular-shaped racetrack. The race took the scheduled 60 laps to complete. Kyle Busch, driving for his own team, Kyle Busch Motorsports, would steal the win after making a last-lap pass on Corey Heim for the lead. This was Busch's 64th career NASCAR Craftsman Truck Series win, his second of the season, and the 100th NASCAR win for Kyle Busch Motorsports. Heim dominated most of the race, leading a race-high 27 laps. To fill out the podium, Heim, driving for Tricon Garage, and Taylor Gray, also driving for Tricon Garage, would finish 2nd and 3rd, respectively.

== Background ==
Pocono Raceway is a 2.5-mile (4.0 km) oval speedway located in Long Pond, Pennsylvania, which has hosted NASCAR racing annually since the early 1970s. Nicknamed "The Tricky Triangle", the speedway has three distinct corners and is known for high speeds along its lengthy straightaways.

From 1982 to 2019, the circuit had two race weekends. In 2020, the circuit was reduced to one race meeting of two races. The first race was moved to World Wide Technology Raceway near St. Louis starting in 2022.

=== Entry list ===
- (R) denotes rookie driver.

| # | Driver | Team | Make |
|---|---|---|---|
| 1 | Kaz Grala (i) | Tricon Garage | Toyota |
| 02 | Stefan Parsons (i) | Young's Motorsports | Chevrolet |
| 2 | Nick Sanchez (R) | Rev Racing | Chevrolet |
| 04 | Cory Roper | Roper Racing | Ford |
| 4 | Chase Purdy | Kyle Busch Motorsports | Chevrolet |
| 5 | Dean Thompson | Tricon Garage | Toyota |
| 6 | Norm Benning | Norm Benning Racing | Chevrolet |
| 7 | Austin Hill (i) | Spire Motorsports | Chevrolet |
| 9 | Colby Howard | CR7 Motorsports | Chevrolet |
| 11 | Corey Heim | Tricon Garage | Toyota |
| 12 | Spencer Boyd | Young's Motorsports | Chevrolet |
| 13 | Hailie Deegan | ThorSport Racing | Ford |
| 15 | Tanner Gray | Tricon Garage | Toyota |
| 16 | Tyler Ankrum | Hattori Racing Enterprises | Toyota |
| 17 | Taylor Gray (R) | Tricon Garage | Toyota |
| 19 | Christian Eckes | McAnally-Hilgemann Racing | Chevrolet |
| 20 | Chad Chastain | Young's Motorsports | Chevrolet |
| 22 | Stephen Mallozzi | AM Racing | Ford |
| 23 | Grant Enfinger | GMS Racing | Chevrolet |
| 24 | Rajah Caruth (R) | GMS Racing | Chevrolet |
| 25 | Matt DiBenedetto | Rackley WAR | Chevrolet |
| 28 | Bryan Dauzat | FDNY Racing | Chevrolet |
| 32 | Bret Holmes (R) | Bret Holmes Racing | Chevrolet |
| 33 | Josh Reaume | Reaume Brothers Racing | Ford |
| 35 | Jake Garcia (R) | McAnally-Hilgemann Racing | Chevrolet |
| 38 | Zane Smith | Front Row Motorsports | Ford |
| 41 | Ross Chastain (i) | Niece Motorsports | Chevrolet |
| 42 | Carson Hocevar | Niece Motorsports | Chevrolet |
| 43 | Daniel Dye (R) | GMS Racing | Chevrolet |
| 44 | Kaden Honeycutt | Niece Motorsports | Chevrolet |
| 45 | Lawless Alan | Niece Motorsports | Chevrolet |
| 51 | Kyle Busch (i) | Kyle Busch Motorsports | Chevrolet |
| 52 | Stewart Friesen | Halmar Friesen Racing | Toyota |
| 56 | Tyler Hill | Hill Motorsports | Toyota |
| 61 | Christopher Bell (i) | Hattori Racing Enterprises | Toyota |
| 75 | Parker Kligerman (i) | Henderson Motorsports | Chevrolet |
| 88 | Matt Crafton | ThorSport Racing | Ford |
| 98 | Ty Majeski | ThorSport Racing | Ford |
| 99 | Ben Rhodes | ThorSport Racing | Ford |
Official entry list

== Practice ==
The first and only practice session was held on Friday, July 21, at 1:35 PM EST, and would last for 20 minutes. Kyle Busch, driving for his own team, Kyle Busch Motorsports, would set the fastest time in the session, with a lap of 54.225, and an average speed of 165.975 mph (267.111 km/h).

| Pos. | # | Driver | Team | Make | Time | Speed |
|---|---|---|---|---|---|---|
| 1 | 51 | Kyle Busch (i) | Kyle Busch Motorsports | Chevrolet | 54.225 | 165.975 |
| 2 | 15 | Tanner Gray | Tricon Garage | Toyota | 54.390 | 165.472 |
| 3 | 98 | Ty Majeski | ThorSport Racing | Ford | 54.652 | 164.678 |
Full practice results

== Qualifying ==
Qualifying was held on Friday, July 21, at 2:05 PM EST. Since Pocono Raceway is a superspeedway, the qualifying system used is a single-car, one-lap system with only one round. In that round, whoever sets the fastest time will win the pole. Nick Sanchez, driving for Rev Racing, would score the pole for the race, with a lap of 53.265, and an average speed of 168.966 mph (271.924 km/h).

| Pos. | # | Driver | Team | Make | Time | Speed |
|---|---|---|---|---|---|---|
| 1 | 2 | Nick Sanchez (R) | Rev Racing | Chevrolet | 53.265 | 168.966 |
| 2 | 35 | Jake Garcia (R) | McAnally-Hilgemann Racing | Chevrolet | 53.474 | 168.306 |
| 3 | 23 | Grant Enfinger | GMS Racing | Chevrolet | 53.507 | 168.202 |
| 4 | 42 | Carson Hocevar | Niece Motorsports | Chevrolet | 53.585 | 167.957 |
| 5 | 7 | Austin Hill (i) | Spire Motorsports | Chevrolet | 53.651 | 167.751 |
| 6 | 38 | Zane Smith | Front Row Motorsports | Ford | 53.719 | 167.538 |
| 7 | 24 | Rajah Caruth (R) | GMS Racing | Chevrolet | 53.753 | 167.433 |
| 8 | 25 | Matt DiBenedetto | Rackley WAR | Chevrolet | 53.758 | 167.417 |
| 9 | 11 | Corey Heim | Tricon Garage | Toyota | 53.783 | 167.339 |
| 10 | 4 | Chase Purdy | Kyle Busch Motorsports | Chevrolet | 53.887 | 167.016 |
| 11 | 17 | Taylor Gray (R) | Tricon Garage | Toyota | 53.935 | 166.868 |
| 12 | 51 | Kyle Busch (i) | Kyle Busch Motorsports | Chevrolet | 54.053 | 166.503 |
| 13 | 15 | Tanner Gray | Tricon Garage | Toyota | 54.060 | 166.482 |
| 14 | 61 | Christopher Bell (i) | Hattori Racing Enterprises | Toyota | 54.126 | 166.279 |
| 15 | 1 | Kaz Grala (i) | Tricon Garage | Toyota | 54.165 | 166.159 |
| 16 | 52 | Stewart Friesen | Halmar Friesen Racing | Toyota | 54.283 | 165.798 |
| 17 | 44 | Kaden Honeycutt | Niece Motorsports | Chevrolet | 54.286 | 165.789 |
| 18 | 16 | Tyler Ankrum | Hattori Racing Enterprises | Toyota | 54.463 | 165.250 |
| 19 | 02 | Stefan Parsons (i) | Young's Motorsports | Chevrolet | 54.468 | 165.235 |
| 20 | 43 | Daniel Dye (R) | GMS Racing | Chevrolet | 54.471 | 165.226 |
| 21 | 13 | Hailie Deegan | ThorSport Racing | Ford | 54.490 | 165.168 |
| 22 | 99 | Ben Rhodes | ThorSport Racing | Ford | 54.512 | 165.101 |
| 23 | 41 | Ross Chastain (i) | Niece Motorsports | Chevrolet | 54.597 | 164.844 |
| 24 | 75 | Parker Kligerman (i) | Henderson Motorsports | Chevrolet | 54.823 | 164.165 |
| 25 | 88 | Matt Crafton | ThorSport Racing | Ford | 54.876 | 164.006 |
| 26 | 9 | Colby Howard | CR7 Motorsports | Chevrolet | 54.956 | 163.767 |
| 27 | 45 | Lawless Alan | Niece Motorsports | Chevrolet | 55.567 | 161.967 |
| 28 | 32 | Bret Holmes (R) | Bret Holmes Racing | Chevrolet | 56.063 | 160.534 |
| 29 | 33 | Josh Reaume | Reaume Brothers Racing | Ford | 56.133 | 160.333 |
| 30 | 12 | Spencer Boyd | Young's Motorsports | Chevrolet | 56.246 | 160.011 |
| 31 | 04 | Cory Roper | Roper Racing | Ford | 56.260 | 159.972 |
Qualified by owner's points
| 32 | 22 | Stephen Mallozzi | AM Racing | Ford | 56.616 | 158.966 |
| 33 | 5 | Dean Thompson | Tricon Garage | Toyota | 1:03.299 | 142.182 |
| 34 | 98 | Ty Majeski | ThorSport Racing | Ford | – | – |
| 35 | 19 | Christian Eckes | McAnally-Hilgemann Racing | Chevrolet | – | – |
| 36 | 56 | Tyler Hill | Hill Motorsports | Toyota | – | – |
Failed to qualify
| 37 | 20 | Chad Chastain | Young's Motorsports | Chevrolet | 57.443 | 157.677 |
| 38 | 28 | Bryan Dauzat | FDNY Racing | Chevrolet | 59.585 | 151.045 |
| 39 | 6 | Norm Benning | Norm Benning Racing | Chevrolet | 1:00.555 | 148.625 |
Official qualifying results
Official starting lineup

== Race results ==
Stage 1 Laps: 15

| Pos. | # | Driver | Team | Make | Pts |
|---|---|---|---|---|---|
| 1 | 38 | Zane Smith | Front Row Motorsports | Ford | 10 |
| 2 | 2 | Nick Sanchez (R) | Rev Racing | Chevrolet | 9 |
| 3 | 25 | Matt DiBenedetto | Rackley WAR | Chevrolet | 8 |
| 4 | 51 | Kyle Busch (i) | Kyle Busch Motorsports | Chevrolet | 0 |
| 5 | 7 | Austin Hill (i) | Spire Motorsports | Chevrolet | 0 |
| 6 | 35 | Jake Garcia (R) | McAnally-Hilgemann Racing | Chevrolet | 5 |
| 7 | 11 | Corey Heim | Tricon Garage | Toyota | 4 |
| 8 | 23 | Grant Enfinger | GMS Racing | Chevrolet | 3 |
| 9 | 52 | Stewart Friesen | Halmar Friesen Racing | Toyota | 2 |
| 10 | 17 | Taylor Gray (R) | Tricon Garage | Toyota | 1 |

Stage 2 Laps: 15

| Pos. | # | Driver | Team | Make | Pts |
|---|---|---|---|---|---|
| 1 | 38 | Zane Smith | Front Row Motorsports | Ford | 10 |
| 2 | 52 | Stewart Friesen | Halmar Friesen Racing | Toyota | 9 |
| 3 | 2 | Nick Sanchez (R) | Rev Racing | Chevrolet | 8 |
| 4 | 25 | Matt DiBenedetto | Rackley WAR | Chevrolet | 7 |
| 5 | 23 | Grant Enfinger | GMS Racing | Chevrolet | 6 |
| 6 | 99 | Ben Rhodes | ThorSport Racing | Ford | 5 |
| 7 | 16 | Tyler Ankrum | Hattori Racing Enterprises | Toyota | 4 |
| 8 | 24 | Rajah Caruth (R) | GMS Racing | Chevrolet | 3 |
| 9 | 9 | Colby Howard | CR7 Motorsports | Chevrolet | 2 |
| 10 | 88 | Matt Crafton | ThorSport Racing | Ford | 1 |

Stage 3 Laps: 30

| Fin | St | # | Driver | Team | Make | Laps | Led | Status | Pts |
|---|---|---|---|---|---|---|---|---|---|
| 1 | 12 | 51 | Kyle Busch (i) | Kyle Busch Motorsports | Chevrolet | 60 | 7 | Running | 0 |
| 2 | 9 | 11 | Corey Heim | Tricon Garage | Toyota | 60 | 27 | Running | 39 |
| 3 | 11 | 17 | Taylor Gray (R) | Tricon Garage | Toyota | 60 | 0 | Running | 35 |
| 4 | 14 | 61 | Christopher Bell (i) | Hattori Racing Enterprises | Toyota | 60 | 0 | Running | 0 |
| 5 | 3 | 23 | Grant Enfinger | GMS Racing | Chevrolet | 60 | 0 | Running | 41 |
| 6 | 34 | 98 | Ty Majeski | ThorSport Racing | Ford | 60 | 0 | Running | 31 |
| 7 | 35 | 19 | Christian Eckes | McAnally-Hilgemann Racing | Chevrolet | 60 | 0 | Running | 30 |
| 8 | 33 | 5 | Dean Thompson | Tricon Garage | Toyota | 60 | 0 | Running | 29 |
| 9 | 22 | 99 | Ben Rhodes | ThorSport Racing | Ford | 60 | 0 | Running | 33 |
| 10 | 8 | 25 | Matt DiBenedetto | Rackley WAR | Chevrolet | 60 | 0 | Running | 42 |
| 11 | 4 | 42 | Carson Hocevar | Niece Motorsports | Chevrolet | 60 | 0 | Running | 26 |
| 12 | 18 | 16 | Tyler Ankrum | Hattori Racing Enterprises | Toyota | 60 | 0 | Running | 29 |
| 13 | 21 | 13 | Hailie Deegan | ThorSport Racing | Ford | 60 | 0 | Running | 24 |
| 14 | 25 | 88 | Matt Crafton | ThorSport Racing | Ford | 60 | 0 | Running | 24 |
| 15 | 26 | 9 | Colby Howard | CR7 Motorsports | Chevrolet | 60 | 0 | Running | 24 |
| 16 | 7 | 24 | Rajah Caruth (R) | GMS Racing | Chevrolet | 60 | 0 | Running | 24 |
| 17 | 20 | 43 | Daniel Dye (R) | GMS Racing | Chevrolet | 60 | 0 | Running | 20 |
| 18 | 10 | 4 | Chase Purdy | Kyle Busch Motorsports | Chevrolet | 60 | 0 | Running | 19 |
| 19 | 1 | 2 | Nick Sanchez (R) | Rev Racing | Chevrolet | 60 | 7 | Running | 35 |
| 20 | 17 | 44 | Kaden Honeycutt | Niece Motorsports | Chevrolet | 60 | 0 | Running | 17 |
| 21 | 36 | 56 | Tyler Hill | Hill Motorsports | Toyota | 60 | 0 | Running | 16 |
| 22 | 24 | 75 | Parker Kligerman (i) | Henderson Motorsports | Chevrolet | 60 | 0 | Running | 0 |
| 23 | 31 | 04 | Cory Roper | Roper Racing | Ford | 60 | 0 | Running | 14 |
| 24 | 32 | 22 | Stephen Mallozzi | AM Racing | Ford | 60 | 0 | Running | 13 |
| 25 | 30 | 12 | Spencer Boyd | Young's Motorsports | Chevrolet | 60 | 0 | Running | 12 |
| 26 | 29 | 33 | Josh Reaume | Reaume Brothers Racing | Ford | 60 | 0 | Running | 11 |
| 27 | 27 | 45 | Lawless Alan | Niece Motorsports | Chevrolet | 60 | 0 | Running | 10 |
| 28 | 19 | 02 | Stefan Parsons (i) | Young's Motorsports | Chevrolet | 60 | 0 | Running | 0 |
| 29 | 28 | 32 | Bret Holmes (R) | Bret Holmes Racing | Chevrolet | 60 | 0 | Running | 8 |
| 30 | 23 | 41 | Ross Chastain (i) | Niece Motorsports | Chevrolet | 52 | 0 | Accident | 0 |
| 31 | 15 | 1 | Kaz Grala (i) | Tricon Garage | Toyota | 51 | 0 | Accident | 0 |
| 32 | 16 | 52 | Stewart Friesen | Halmar Friesen Racing | Toyota | 51 | 0 | Accident | 16 |
| 33 | 5 | 7 | Austin Hill (i) | Spire Motorsports | Chevrolet | 51 | 0 | Accident | 0 |
| 34 | 6 | 38 | Zane Smith | Front Row Motorsports | Ford | 51 | 19 | Accident | 23 |
| 35 | 2 | 35 | Jake Garcia (R) | McAnally-Hilgemann Racing | Chevrolet | 45 | 0 | Accident | 7 |
| 36 | 13 | 15 | Tanner Gray | Tricon Garage | Toyota | 3 | 0 | Accident | 1 |
Official race results

== Standings after the race ==
Drivers' Championship standings

| | Pos | Driver | Points |
|---|---|---|---|
| | 1 | Corey Heim | 569 |
| | 2 | Zane Smith | 527 (-42) |
| 2 | 3 | Grant Enfinger | 510 (-59) |
| | 4 | Ben Rhodes | 510 (-59) |
| 2 | 5 | Ty Majeski | 510 (-59) |
| | 6 | Christian Eckes | 480 (-89) |
| | 7 | Carson Hocevar | 444 (-125) |
| | 8 | Matt DiBenedetto | 431 (-138) |
| | 9 | Nick Sanchez | 421 (-148) |
| | 10 | Matt Crafton | 409 (-160) |
Official driver's standings

- Note: Only the first 10 positions are included for the driver standings.

| Previous race: 2023 O'Reilly Auto Parts 150 at Mid-Ohio | NASCAR Craftsman Truck Series; 2023 season | Next race: 2023 Worldwide Express 250 |
