= 2023 Long John Silver's 200 =

7th race of the 2023 NASCAR Craftsman Truck Series

Race details
- Race 7 of 23 of the 2023 NASCAR Craftsman Truck Series
- Date: April 14, 2023
- Official name: 25th Annual Long John Silver's 200
- Location: Martinsville Speedway, Ridgeway, Virginia
- Course: Permanent racing facility
- Course length: 0.526 miles (0.847 km)
- Distance: 124 laps, 65 mi (104 km)
- Scheduled distance: 200 laps, 105 mi (169 km)
- Average speed: 46.849 mph (75.396 km/h)

Pole position
Driver	Zane Smith	Front Row Motorsports
- Time: 19.797

Most laps led
Driver	Corey Heim	Tricon Garage
- Laps: 82

Winner
No. 11	Corey Heim	Tricon Garage

Television in the United States
- Network: FS1
- Announcers: Jamie Little, Phil Parsons, and Michael Waltrip

Radio in the United States
- Radio: MRN

The 2023 Long John Silver's 200 was the 7th stock car race of the 2023 NASCAR Craftsman Truck Series, and the 25th iteration of the event. The race was held on Friday, April 14, 2023, in Ridgeway, Virginia at Martinsville Speedway, a 0.526 miles (0.847 km) permanent paper-clip shaped racetrack. The race was decreased from 200 laps to 124 laps, due to constant rain showers. In a race that sparked controversy, Corey Heim, driving for Tricon Garage, would win the race after putting on a dominating performance, winning both stages and leading 82 laps to earn his third career NASCAR Craftsman Truck Series win, along with his first of the season. To fill out the podium, Kyle Busch, driving for his own team, Kyle Busch Motorsports, and Zane Smith, driving for Front Row Motorsports, would finish 2nd and 3rd, respectively.

== Background ==
Martinsville Speedway is a NASCAR-owned stock car racing track located in Henry County, in Ridgeway, Virginia, just to the south of Martinsville. At 0.526 miles (0.847 km) in length, it is the shortest track in the NASCAR Cup Series. The track was also one of the first paved oval tracks in NASCAR, being built in 1947 by H. Clay Earles. It is also the only remaining race track on the NASCAR circuit since its beginning in 1948.

=== Entry list ===
- (R) denotes rookie driver.
- (i) denotes driver who is ineligible for series driver points.

#	Driver	Team	Make
1	William Sawalich	Tricon Garage	Toyota
02	Kris Wright	Young's Motorsports	Chevrolet
2	Nick Sanchez (R)	Rev Racing	Chevrolet
04	Kaden Honeycutt	Roper Racing	Ford
4	Chase Purdy	Kyle Busch Motorsports	Chevrolet
5	Dean Thompson	Tricon Garage	Toyota
9	Colby Howard	CR7 Motorsports	Chevrolet
11	Corey Heim	Tricon Garage	Toyota
12	Spencer Boyd	Young's Motorsports	Chevrolet
13	Hailie Deegan	ThorSport Racing	Ford
15	Tanner Gray	Tricon Garage	Toyota
16	Tyler Ankrum	Hattori Racing Enterprises	Toyota
17	Taylor Gray (R)	Tricon Garage	Toyota
19	Christian Eckes	McAnally-Hilgemann Racing	Chevrolet
20	Brad Perez (i)	Young's Motorsports	Chevrolet
22	Stephen Mallozzi	AM Racing	Ford
23	Grant Enfinger	GMS Racing	Chevrolet
24	Rajah Caruth (R)	GMS Racing	Chevrolet
25	Matt DiBenedetto	Rackley WAR	Chevrolet
30	Jonathan Shafer	On Point Motorsports	Toyota
32	Bret Holmes (R)	Bret Holmes Racing	Chevrolet
33	Mason Massey	Reaume Brothers Racing	Ford
35	Jake Garcia (R)	McAnally-Hilgemann Racing	Chevrolet
38	Zane Smith	Front Row Motorsports	Ford
41	Ross Chastain (i)	Niece Motorsports	Chevrolet
42	Carson Hocevar	Niece Motorsports	Chevrolet
43	Daniel Dye (R)	GMS Racing	Chevrolet
45	Lawless Alan	Niece Motorsports	Chevrolet
46	Memphis Villarreal	G2G Racing	Toyota
51	Kyle Busch (i)	Kyle Busch Motorsports	Chevrolet
52	Stewart Friesen	Halmar Friesen Racing	Toyota
56	Timmy Hill	Hill Motorsports	Toyota
66	Conner Jones	ThorSport Racing	Ford
88	Matt Crafton	ThorSport Racing	Ford
90	Justin Carroll	TC Motorsports	Toyota
98	Ty Majeski	ThorSport Racing	Ford
99	Ben Rhodes	ThorSport Racing	Ford
Official entry list

== Practice ==
For practice, drivers will be separated into two groups, Group A and B. Both sessions will be 15 minutes long, and will be held on Friday, April 14, at 3:00 PM EST. Ty Majeski, driving for ThorSport Racing, was the fastest driver in total, with a lap of 20.246, and an average speed of 93.530 mph (150.522 km/h).

Pos.	#	Driver	Team	Make	Time	Speed
1	98	Ty Majeski	ThorSport Racing	Ford	20.246	93.530
2	51	Kyle Busch (i)	Kyle Busch Motorsports	Chevrolet	20.336	93.116
3	38	Zane Smith	Front Row Motorsports	Ford	20.407	92.792
Full practice results

== Qualifying ==
Qualifying was held on Friday, April 14, at 3:35 PM EST. Since Martinsville Speedway is a short track, the qualifying system used is a single-car, two-lap system with only one round. In that round, whoever sets the fastest time will win the pole. Zane Smith, driving for Front Row Motorsports, would score the pole for the race, with a lap of 19.797, and an average speed of 95.651 mph (153.935 km/h).

Pos.	#	Driver	Team	Make	Time	Speed
1	38	Zane Smith	Front Row Motorsports	Ford	19.797	95.651
2	51	Kyle Busch (i)	Kyle Busch Motorsports	Chevrolet	19.828	95.501
3	99	Ben Rhodes	ThorSport Racing	Ford	19.835	95.468
4	11	Corey Heim	Tricon Garage	Toyota	19.843	95.429
5	25	Matt DiBenedetto	Rackley WAR	Chevrolet	19.866	95.319
6	19	Christian Eckes	McAnally-Hilgemann Racing	Chevrolet	19.904	95.137
7	42	Carson Hocevar	Niece Motorsports	Chevrolet	19.904	95.137
8	4	Chase Purdy	Kyle Busch Motorsports	Chevrolet	19.909	95.113
9	15	Tanner Gray	Tricon Garage	Toyota	19.925	95.036
10	23	Grant Enfinger	GMS Racing	Chevrolet	19.968	94.832
11	88	Matt Crafton	ThorSport Racing	Ford	19.997	94.694
12	98	Ty Majeski	ThorSport Racing	Ford	20.043	94.477
13	52	Stewart Friesen	Halmar Friesen Racing	Toyota	20.045	94.467
14	16	Tyler Ankrum	Hattori Racing Enterprises	Toyota	20.054	94.425
15	66	Conner Jones	ThorSport Racing	Ford	20.061	94.392
16	24	Rajah Caruth (R)	GMS Racing	Chevrolet	20.064	94.378
17	04	Kaden Honeycutt	Roper Racing	Ford	20.088	94.265
18	35	Jake Garcia (R)	McAnally-Hilgemann Racing	Chevrolet	20.096	94.228
19	2	Nick Sanchez (R)	Rev Racing	Chevrolet	20.099	94.214
20	45	Lawless Alan	Niece Motorsports	Chevrolet	20.109	94.167
21	43	Daniel Dye (R)	GMS Racing	Chevrolet	20.114	94.143
22	1	William Sawalich	Tricon Garage	Toyota	20.131	94.064
23	32	Bret Holmes (R)	Bret Holmes Racing	Chevrolet	20.167	93.896
24	17	Taylor Gray (R)	Tricon Garage	Toyota	20.170	93.882
25	41	Ross Chastain (i)	Niece Motorsports	Chevrolet	20.184	93.817
26	9	Colby Howard	CR7 Motorsports	Chevrolet	20.193	93.775
27	13	Hailie Deegan	ThorSport Racing	Ford	20.196	93.761
28	56	Timmy Hill	Hill Motorsports	Toyota	20.300	93.281
29	46	Memphis Villarreal	G2G Racing	Toyota	20.396	92.842
30	12	Spencer Boyd	Young's Motorsports	Chevrolet	20.459	92.556
31	02	Kris Wright	Young's Motorsports	Chevrolet	20.469	92.511
Qualified by owner's points
32	33	Mason Massey	Reaume Brothers Racing	Ford	20.493	92.402
33	30	Jonathan Shafer	On Point Motorsports	Toyota	20.569	92.061
34	20	Brad Perez (i)	Young's Motorsports	Chevrolet	20.591	91.963
35	22	Stephen Mallozzi	AM Racing	Ford	20.997	90.184
36	5	Dean Thompson	Tricon Garage	Toyota	–	–
Failed to qualify
37	90	Justin Carroll	TC Motorsports	Toyota	20.515	92.303
Official qualifying results
Official starting lineup

== Race results ==
Stage 1 Laps: 50

Pos.	#	Driver	Team	Make	Pts
1	11	Corey Heim	Tricon Garage	Toyota	10
2	51	Kyle Busch (i)	Kyle Busch Motorsports	Chevrolet	0
3	38	Zane Smith	Front Row Motorsports	Ford	8
4	15	Tanner Gray	Tricon Garage	Toyota	7
5	19	Christian Eckes	McAnally-Hilgemann Racing	Chevrolet	6
6	99	Ben Rhodes	ThorSport Racing	Ford	5
7	98	Ty Majeski	ThorSport Racing	Ford	4
8	25	Matt DiBenedetto	Rackley WAR	Chevrolet	3
9	42	Carson Hocevar	Niece Motorsports	Chevrolet	2
10	1	William Sawalich	Tricon Garage	Toyota	1

Stage 2 Laps: 50

Pos.	#	Driver	Team	Make	Pts
1	11	Corey Heim	Tricon Garage	Toyota	10
2	51	Kyle Busch (i)	Kyle Busch Motorsports	Chevrolet	0
3	38	Zane Smith	Front Row Motorsports	Ford	8
4	19	Christian Eckes	McAnally-Hilgemann Racing	Chevrolet	7
5	15	Tanner Gray	Tricon Garage	Toyota	6
6	98	Ty Majeski	ThorSport Racing	Ford	5
7	99	Ben Rhodes	ThorSport Racing	Ford	4
8	42	Carson Hocevar	Niece Motorsports	Chevrolet	3
9	25	Matt DiBenedetto	Rackley WAR	Chevrolet	2
10	9	Colby Howard	CR7 Motorsports	Chevrolet	1

Stage 3 Laps: 24

Fin	St	#	Driver	Team	Make	Laps	Led	Status	Pts
1	4	11	Corey Heim	Tricon Garage	Toyota	124	82	Running	60
2	2	51	Kyle Busch (i)	Kyle Busch Motorsports	Chevrolet	124	37	Running	0
3	1	38	Zane Smith	Front Row Motorsports	Ford	124	5	Running	50
4	12	98	Ty Majeski	ThorSport Racing	Ford	124	0	Running	42
5	9	15	Tanner Gray	Tricon Garage	Toyota	124	0	Running	45
6	3	99	Ben Rhodes	ThorSport Racing	Ford	124	0	Running	40
7	5	25	Matt DiBenedetto	Rackley WAR	Chevrolet	124	0	Running	35
8	24	17	Taylor Gray (R)	Tricon Garage	Toyota	124	0	Running	29
9	22	1	William Sawalich	Tricon Garage	Toyota	124	0	Running	29
10	8	4	Chase Purdy	Kyle Busch Motorsports	Chevrolet	124	0	Running	27
11	19	2	Nick Sanchez (R)	Rev Racing	Chevrolet	124	0	Running	26
12	25	41	Ross Chastain (i)	Niece Motorsports	Chevrolet	124	0	Running	0
13	18	35	Jake Garcia (R)	McAnally-Hilgemann Racing	Chevrolet	124	0	Running	24
14	10	23	Grant Enfinger	GMS Racing	Chevrolet	124	0	Running	23
15	6	19	Christian Eckes	McAnally-Hilgemann Racing	Chevrolet	124	0	Running	35
16	31	02	Kris Wright	Young's Motorsports	Chevrolet	124	0	Running	21
17	26	9	Colby Howard	CR7 Motorsports	Chevrolet	124	0	Running	21
18	15	66	Conner Jones	ThorSport Racing	Ford	124	0	Running	19
19	28	56	Timmy Hill	Hill Motorsports	Toyota	124	0	Running	18
20	27	13	Hailie Deegan	ThorSport Racing	Ford	124	0	Running	17
21	36	5	Dean Thompson	Tricon Garage	Toyota	124	0	Running	16
22	23	32	Bret Holmes (R)	Bret Holmes Racing	Chevrolet	124	0	Running	15
23	30	12	Spencer Boyd	Young's Motorsports	Chevrolet	124	0	Running	14
24	29	46	Memphis Villarreal	G2G Racing	Toyota	124	0	Running	13
25	16	24	Rajah Caruth (R)	GMS Racing	Chevrolet	124	0	Running	12
26	11	88	Matt Crafton	ThorSport Racing	Ford	124	0	Running	11
27	14	16	Tyler Ankrum	Hattori Racing Enterprises	Toyota	124	0	Running	10
28	17	04	Kaden Honeycutt	Roper Racing	Ford	123	0	Running	9
29	33	30	Jonathan Shafer	On Point Motorsports	Toyota	123	0	Running	8
30	13	52	Stewart Friesen	Halmar Friesen Racing	Toyota	123	0	Running	7
31	21	43	Daniel Dye (R)	GMS Racing	Chevrolet	123	0	Running	6
32	20	45	Lawless Alan	Niece Motorsports	Chevrolet	122	0	Running	5
33	32	33	Mason Massey	Reaume Brothers Racing	Ford	122	0	Running	4
34	7	42	Carson Hocevar	Niece Motorsports	Chevrolet	122	0	Running	8
35	34	20	Brad Perez (i)	Young's Motorsports	Chevrolet	118	0	Running	0
36	35	22	Stephen Mallozzi	AM Racing	Ford	116	0	Running	1
Official race results

== Standings after the race ==
Drivers' Championship standings

	Pos	Driver	Points
	1	Ty Majeski	301
	2	Zane Smith	275 (-26)
	3	Ben Rhodes	252 (-49)
3	4	Corey Heim	230 (-71)
	5	Christian Eckes	229 (-72)
	6	Grant Enfinger	211 (-90)
3	7	Matt Crafton	209 (-92)
	8	Tanner Gray	201 (-100)
	9	Matt DiBenedetto	185 (-116)
1	10	Chase Purdy	174 (-127)
Official driver's standings

- Note: Only the first 10 positions are included for the driver standings.

Previous race: 2023 Weather Guard Truck Race on Dirt	NASCAR Craftsman Truck Series; 2023 season	Next race: 2023 Heart of America 200
