= 2025 Sober or Slammer 200 =

19th race of the 2025 NASCAR Craftsman Truck Series

Race details
- Race 19 of 25 of the 2025 NASCAR Craftsman Truck Series
- Date: August 30, 2025
- Location: Darlington Raceway in Darlington, South Carolina
- Course: Permanent racing facility
- Course length: 1.366 miles (2.198 km)
- Distance: 147 laps, 200 mi (323 km)
- Scheduled distance: 147 laps, 200 mi (323 km)
- Average speed: 121.514 mph (195.558 km/h)

Pole position
Driver	Layne Riggs	Front Row Motorsports
- Time: 29.323

Most laps led
Driver	Layne Riggs	Front Row Motorsports
- Laps: 71

Winner
No. 11	Corey Heim	Tricon Garage

Television in the United States
- Network: FS1
- Announcers: Jamie Little, Kevin Harvick, and Todd Bodine

Radio in the United States
- Radio: MRN

The 2025 Sober or Slammer 200 was the 19th stock car race of the 2025 NASCAR Craftsman Truck Series, the first race of the Round of 10, and the 6th iteration of the event. The race was held on Saturday, August 30, 2025, at Darlington Raceway in Darlington, South Carolina, a 1.366 miles (2.198 km) permanent asphalt egg-shaped speedway. The race took the scheduled 147 laps to complete.

Corey Heim, driving for Tricon Garage, would take advantage of late-race troubles for Layne Riggs, and led the final 19 laps to earn his 19th career NASCAR Craftsman Truck Series win, and his eighth of the season. He would also advance into the next round of the playoffs. Riggs led a race-high 71 laps and won the second stage, until hitting the wall late in the event, falling back to finish 17th. To fill out the podium, Daniel Hemric, driving for McAnally-Hilgemann Racing, and Grant Enfinger, driving for CR7 Motorsports, would finish 2nd and 3rd, respectively.

== Report ==
=== Background ===
Darlington Raceway, the track where the race was held.

Darlington Raceway is a race track built for NASCAR racing located near Darlington, South Carolina. It is nicknamed "The Lady in Black" and "The Track Too Tough to Tame" by many NASCAR fans and drivers and advertised as "A NASCAR Tradition." It is of a unique, somewhat egg-shaped design, an oval with the ends of very different configurations, a condition which supposedly arose from the proximity of one end of the track to a minnow pond the owner refused to relocate. This situation makes it very challenging for the crews to set up their cars' handling in a way that is effective at both ends.

This was the first time since 2021 that Darlington had held a Truck Series race during the Southern 500 weekend, as the Xfinity Series raced at Portland. The race returned to the Goodyear 400 weekend in 2026 as a Friday night race.

=== Entry list ===
- (R) denotes rookie driver.
- (i) denotes driver who is ineligible for series driver points.
- (P) denotes playoff driver.
- (OP) denotes owner's playoff truck.

#	Driver	Team	Make
1	Trevor Bayne	Tricon Garage	Toyota
02	Nathan Byrd	Young's Motorsports	Chevrolet
2	Stephen Mallozzi	Reaume Brothers Racing	Ford
5	Toni Breidinger (R)	Tricon Garage	Toyota
7	Corey Day (i) (OP)	Spire Motorsports	Chevrolet
9	Grant Enfinger (P)	CR7 Motorsports	Chevrolet
11	Corey Heim (P)	Tricon Garage	Toyota
13	Jake Garcia (P)	ThorSport Racing	Ford
15	Tanner Gray	Tricon Garage	Toyota
17	Gio Ruggiero (R)	Tricon Garage	Toyota
18	Tyler Ankrum (P)	McAnally-Hilgemann Racing	Chevrolet
19	Daniel Hemric (P)	McAnally-Hilgemann Racing	Chevrolet
20	Stefan Parsons	Young's Motorsports	Chevrolet
22	Clayton Green	Reaume Brothers Racing	Ford
26	Dawson Sutton (R)	Rackley W.A.R.	Chevrolet
33	Mason Maggio (i)	Reaume Brothers Racing	Ford
34	Layne Riggs (P)	Front Row Motorsports	Ford
38	Chandler Smith (P)	Front Row Motorsports	Ford
42	Matt Mills	Niece Motorsports	Chevrolet
44	Andrés Pérez de Lara (R)	Niece Motorsports	Chevrolet
45	Bayley Currey	Niece Motorsports	Chevrolet
52	Kaden Honeycutt (P)	Halmar Friesen Racing	Toyota
56	Timmy Hill	Hill Motorsports	Toyota
71	Rajah Caruth (P)	Spire Motorsports	Chevrolet
74	Caleb Costner	Mike Harmon Racing	Toyota
76	Spencer Boyd	Freedom Racing Enterprises	Chevrolet
77	Corey LaJoie	Spire Motorsports	Chevrolet
81	Connor Mosack (R)	McAnally-Hilgemann Racing	Chevrolet
88	Matt Crafton	ThorSport Racing	Ford
91	Jack Wood	McAnally-Hilgemann Racing	Chevrolet
98	Ty Majeski (P)	ThorSport Racing	Ford
99	Ben Rhodes	ThorSport Racing	Ford
Official entry list

== Practice ==
For practice, drivers were separated into two groups, A and B. Both sessions were 25 minutes long, and was held on Friday, August 29, at 3:05 PM EST. Timmy Hill, driving for his own team, Hill Motorsports, would set the fastest time between both groups, with a lap of 30.186, and a speed of 162.910 mph (262.178 km/h).

Pos.	#	Driver	Team	Make	Time	Speed
1	56	Timmy Hill	Hill Motorsports	Toyota	30.186	162.910
2	20	Stefan Parsons	Young's Motorsports	Chevrolet	30.201	162.829
3	91	Jack Wood	McAnally-Hilgemann Racing	Chevrolet	30.291	162.345
Full practice results

== Qualifying ==
Qualifying was held on Friday, August 29, at 4:10 PM EST. Since Darlington Raceway is an intermediate speedway, the qualifying system used is a single-car, one-lap system with one round. Drivers will be on track by themselves and will have one lap to post a qualifying time, and whoever sets the fastest time will win the pole.

Layne Riggs, driving for Front Row Motorsports, would score the pole for the race, with a lap of 29.323, and a speed of 167.705 mph (269.895 km/h).

No drivers would fail to qualify.

=== Qualifying results ===
Pos.	#	Driver	Team	Make	Time	Speed
1	34	Layne Riggs (P)	Front Row Motorsports	Ford	29.323	167.705
2	38	Chandler Smith (P)	Front Row Motorsports	Ford	29.331	167.659
3	11	Corey Heim (P)	Tricon Garage	Toyota	29.345	167.579
4	9	Grant Enfinger (P)	CR7 Motorsports	Chevrolet	29.392	167.311
5	52	Kaden Honeycutt (P)	Halmar Friesen Racing	Toyota	29.520	166.585
6	17	Gio Ruggiero (R)	Tricon Garage	Toyota	29.665	165.771
7	19	Daniel Hemric (P)	McAnally-Hilgemann Racing	Chevrolet	29.670	165.743
8	98	Ty Majeski (P)	ThorSport Racing	Ford	29.725	165.437
9	77	Corey LaJoie	Spire Motorsports	Chevrolet	29.741	165.348
10	18	Tyler Ankrum (P)	McAnally-Hilgemann Racing	Chevrolet	29.830	164.854
11	71	Rajah Caruth (P)	Spire Motorsports	Chevrolet	29.844	164.777
12	15	Tanner Gray	Tricon Garage	Toyota	29.925	164.331
13	13	Jake Garcia (P)	ThorSport Racing	Ford	30.006	163.887
14	81	Connor Mosack (R)	McAnally-Hilgemann Racing	Chevrolet	30.084	163.462
15	7	Corey Day (i) (OP)	Spire Motorsports	Chevrolet	30.090	163.430
16	1	Trevor Bayne	Tricon Garage	Toyota	30.169	163.002
17	45	Bayley Currey	Niece Motorsports	Chevrolet	30.194	162.867
18	42	Matt Mills	Niece Motorsports	Chevrolet	30.201	162.829
19	26	Dawson Sutton (R)	Rackley W.A.R.	Chevrolet	30.214	162.759
20	44	Andrés Pérez de Lara (R)	Niece Motorsports	Chevrolet	30.243	162.603
21	99	Ben Rhodes	ThorSport Racing	Ford	30.318	162.201
22	88	Matt Crafton	ThorSport Racing	Ford	30.431	161.598
23	20	Stefan Parsons	Young's Motorsports	Chevrolet	30.632	160.538
24	56	Timmy Hill	Hill Motorsports	Toyota	30.632	160.538
25	91	Jack Wood	McAnally-Hilgemann Racing	Chevrolet	30.868	159.311
26	76	Spencer Boyd	Freedom Racing Enterprises	Chevrolet	31.140	157.919
27	33	Mason Maggio (i)	Reaume Brothers Racing	Ford	31.289	157.167
28	02	Nathan Byrd	Young's Motorsports	Chevrolet	31.558	155.827
29	5	Toni Breidinger (R)	Tricon Garage	Toyota	31.916	154.079
30	74	Caleb Costner	Mike Harmon Racing	Toyota	33.535	146.641
31	22	Clayton Green	Reaume Brothers Racing	Ford	34.150	144.000
Qualified by owner's points
32	2	Stephen Mallozzi	Reaume Brothers Racing	Ford	–	–
Official qualifying results
Official starting lineup

== Race results ==
Stage 1 Laps: 45

Pos.	#	Driver	Team	Make	Pts
1	11	Corey Heim (P)	Tricon Garage	Toyota	10
2	34	Layne Riggs (P)	Front Row Motorsports	Ford	9
3	9	Grant Enfinger (P)	CR7 Motorsports	Chevrolet	8
4	19	Daniel Hemric (P)	McAnally-Hilgemann Racing	Chevrolet	7
5	17	Gio Ruggiero (R)	Tricon Garage	Toyota	6
6	18	Tyler Ankrum (P)	McAnally-Hilgemann Racing	Chevrolet	5
7	15	Tanner Gray	Tricon Garage	Toyota	4
8	77	Corey LaJoie	Spire Motorsports	Chevrolet	3
9	7	Corey Day (i) (OP)	Spire Motorsports	Chevrolet	0
10	71	Rajah Caruth (P)	Spire Motorsports	Chevrolet	1

Stage 2 Laps: 45

Pos.	#	Driver	Team	Make	Pts
1	34	Layne Riggs (P)	Front Row Motorsports	Ford	10
2	11	Corey Heim (P)	Tricon Garage	Toyota	9
3	9	Grant Enfinger (P)	CR7 Motorsports	Chevrolet	8
4	19	Daniel Hemric (P)	McAnally-Hilgemann Racing	Chevrolet	7
5	17	Gio Ruggiero (R)	Tricon Garage	Toyota	6
6	77	Corey LaJoie	Spire Motorsports	Chevrolet	5
7	18	Tyler Ankrum (P)	McAnally-Hilgemann Racing	Chevrolet	4
8	15	Tanner Gray	Tricon Garage	Toyota	3
9	1	Trevor Bayne	Tricon Garage	Toyota	2
10	7	Corey Day (i) (OP)	Spire Motorsports	Chevrolet	0

Stage 3 Laps: 57

Fin	St	#	Driver	Team	Make	Laps	Led	Status	Pts
1	3	11	Corey Heim (P)	Tricon Garage	Toyota	147	65	Running	59
2	7	19	Daniel Hemric (P)	McAnally-Hilgemann Racing	Chevrolet	147	0	Running	49
3	4	9	Grant Enfinger (P)	CR7 Motorsports	Chevrolet	147	1	Running	50
4	8	98	Ty Majeski (P)	ThorSport Racing	Ford	147	0	Running	33
5	16	1	Trevor Bayne	Tricon Garage	Toyota	147	0	Running	34
6	12	15	Tanner Gray	Tricon Garage	Toyota	147	0	Running	38
7	10	18	Tyler Ankrum (P)	McAnally-Hilgemann Racing	Chevrolet	147	0	Running	39
8	23	56	Timmy Hill	Hill Motorsports	Toyota	147	0	Running	29
9	15	7	Corey Day (i) (OP)	Spire Motorsports	Chevrolet	147	0	Running	0
10	13	13	Jake Garcia (P)	ThorSport Racing	Ford	147	0	Running	27
11	21	99	Ben Rhodes	ThorSport Racing	Ford	147	0	Running	26
12	11	71	Rajah Caruth (P)	Spire Motorsports	Chevrolet	147	0	Running	26
13	14	81	Connor Mosack (R)	McAnally-Hilgemann Racing	Chevrolet	147	0	Running	24
14	25	91	Jack Wood	McAnally-Hilgemann Racing	Chevrolet	147	0	Running	23
15	24	20	Stefan Parsons	Young's Motorsports	Chevrolet	147	0	Running	22
16	20	44	Andrés Pérez de Lara (R)	Niece Motorsports	Chevrolet	147	0	Running	21
17	1	34	Layne Riggs (P)	Front Row Motorsports	Ford	147	71	Running	39
18	5	52	Kaden Honeycutt (P)	Halmar Friesen Racing	Toyota	147	0	Running	19
19	19	26	Dawson Sutton (R)	Rackley W.A.R.	Chevrolet	147	0	Running	18
20	9	77	Corey LaJoie	Spire Motorsports	Chevrolet	146	0	Running	25
21	22	88	Matt Crafton	ThorSport Racing	Ford	146	0	Running	16
22	6	17	Gio Ruggiero (R)	Tricon Garage	Toyota	146	0	Running	27
23	26	76	Spencer Boyd	Freedom Racing Enterprises	Chevrolet	145	0	Running	14
24	29	5	Toni Breidinger (R)	Tricon Garage	Toyota	143	0	Running	13
25	17	45	Bayley Currey	Niece Motorsports	Chevrolet	140	0	Running	12
26	27	33	Mason Maggio (i)	Reaume Brothers Racing	Ford	128	0	Handling	0
27	28	02	Nathan Byrd	Young's Motorsports	Chevrolet	113	0	Running	10
28	30	74	Caleb Costner	Mike Harmon Racing	Toyota	25	0	Handling	9
29	18	42	Matt Mills	Niece Motorsports	Chevrolet	21	0	Accident	8
30	2	38	Chandler Smith (P)	Front Row Motorsports	Ford	14	10	Accident	8
31	32	2	Stephen Mallozzi	Reaume Brothers Racing	Ford	4	0	Rear Gear	6
32	31	22	Clayton Green	Reaume Brothers Racing	Ford	3	0	Transmission	5
Official race results

== Standings after the race ==
Drivers' Championship standings

	Pos	Driver	Points
	1	Corey Heim	2,124
	2	Layne Riggs	2,065 (–59)
1	3	Daniel Hemric	2,060 (–64)
3	4	Grant Enfinger	2,057 (–67)
	5	Tyler Ankrum	2,049 (–75)
	6	Ty Majeski	2,043 (–81)
1	7	Rajah Caruth	2,031 (–93)
2	8	Jake Garcia	2,029 (–95)
6	9	Chandler Smith	2,027 (–97)
1	10	Kaden Honeycutt	2,022 (–102)
Official driver's standings

Manufacturers' Championship standings

	Pos	Manufacturer	Points
1	1	Toyota	691
1	2	Chevrolet	684 (–7)
	3	Ford	658 (–33)

- Note: Only the first 10 positions are included for the driver standings.

Previous race: 2025 eero 250	NASCAR Craftsman Truck Series; 2025 season	Next race: 2025 UNOH 250
