= 2024 Explore the Pocono Mountains 225 =

19th race of the 2024 NASCAR Xfinity Series

Race details
- Race 19 of 33 of the 2024 NASCAR Xfinity Series
- Date: July 13, 2024
- Location: Pocono Raceway, Long Pond, Pennsylvania
- Course: Permanent racing facility
- Course length: 2.5 miles (4.0 km)
- Distance: 90 laps, 225 mi (362 km)
- Scheduled distance: 90 laps, 225 mi (362 km)
- Average speed: 105.113 mph (169.163 km/h)

Pole position
Driver	Sheldon Creed	Joe Gibbs Racing
- Time: 53.810

Most laps led
Driver	Justin Allgaier	JR Motorsports
- Laps: 30

Winner
No. 00	Cole Custer	Stewart–Haas Racing

Television in the United States
- Network: USA
- Announcers: Rick Allen, Steve Letarte, and Jeff Burton

Radio in the United States
- Radio: MRN

The 2024 Explore the Pocono Mountains 225 was the 19th stock car race of the 2024 NASCAR Xfinity Series, and the 30th iteration of the event. The race was held on Saturday, July 13, 2024, in Long Pond, Pennsylvania at Pocono Raceway, a 2.0 miles (3.2 km) permanent triangular-shaped racetrack. The race took the scheduled 90 laps to complete. In an action packed race, Cole Custer driving for Stewart–Haas Racing, would come out on top, earning his 14th career NASCAR Xfinity Series victory and Fords first win of the season. To fill out the podium, Justin Allgaier, driving for JR Motorsports, and William Byron, driving for Hendrick Motorsports, would finish 2nd and 3rd, respectively.

== Report ==
Pocono Raceway is a 2.5-mile (4.0 km) oval speedway located in Long Pond, Pennsylvania, which has hosted NASCAR racing annually since the early 1970s. Nicknamed "The Tricky Triangle", the speedway has three distinct corners and is known for high speeds along its lengthy straightaways.

From 1982 to 2019, the circuit had two race weekends. In 2020, the circuit was reduced to one race meeting of two races. The first race was moved to World Wide Technology Raceway near St. Louis starting in 2022.

=== Entry list ===
- (R) denotes rookie driver.
- (i) denotes driver who is ineligible for series driver points.

#	Driver	Team	Make
00	Cole Custer	Stewart–Haas Racing	Ford
1	Sam Mayer	JR Motorsports	Chevrolet
2	Jesse Love (R)	Richard Childress Racing	Chevrolet
4	Thomas Annunziata	JD Motorsports	Chevrolet
5	Anthony Alfredo	Our Motorsports	Chevrolet
07	Patrick Emerling	SS-Green Light Racing	Chevrolet
7	Justin Allgaier	JR Motorsports	Chevrolet
8	Sammy Smith	JR Motorsports	Chevrolet
9	Brandon Jones	JR Motorsports	Chevrolet
10	Daniel Dye (i)	Kaulig Racing	Chevrolet
11	Josh Williams	Kaulig Racing	Chevrolet
14	Mason Massey (i)	SS-Green Light Racing	Chevrolet
15	Josh Berry (i)	AM Racing	Ford
16	A. J. Allmendinger	Kaulig Racing	Chevrolet
17	William Byron (i)	Hendrick Motorsports	Chevrolet
18	Sheldon Creed	Joe Gibbs Racing	Toyota
19	Taylor Gray (i)	Joe Gibbs Racing	Toyota
20	Ryan Truex	Joe Gibbs Racing	Toyota
21	Austin Hill	Richard Childress Racing	Chevrolet
26	Corey Heim (i)	Sam Hunt Racing	Toyota
27	Jeb Burton	Jordan Anderson Racing	Chevrolet
28	Kyle Sieg	RSS Racing	Ford
29	Blaine Perkins	RSS Racing	Ford
31	Parker Retzlaff	Jordan Anderson Racing	Chevrolet
35	Stephen Mallozzi (i)	Joey Gase Motorsports	Chevrolet
38	Matt DiBenedetto	RSS Racing	Ford
39	Ryan Sieg	RSS Racing	Ford
42	Leland Honeyman (R)	Young's Motorsports	Chevrolet
43	Ryan Ellis	Alpha Prime Racing	Chevrolet
44	Brennan Poole	Alpha Prime Racing	Chevrolet
48	Parker Kligerman	Big Machine Racing	Chevrolet
51	Jeremy Clements	Jeremy Clements Racing	Chevrolet
74	Dawson Cram (i)	Mike Harmon Racing	Chevrolet
81	Chandler Smith	Joe Gibbs Racing	Toyota
91	Kyle Weatherman	DGM Racing	Chevrolet
92	Josh Bilicki	DGM Racing	Chevrolet
97	Shane van Gisbergen (R)	Kaulig Racing	Chevrolet
98	Riley Herbst	Stewart–Haas Racing	Ford
Official entry list

== Practice ==
The first and only practice session was held on Saturday, July 13, at 10:00 AM ET, and would last for 20 minutes. Ryan Sieg, driving for RSS Racing, would set the fastest time in the session, with a lap of 54.752, and a speed of 164.408 mph (264.589 km/h).

Pos.	#	Driver	Team	Make	Time	Speed
1	39	Ryan Sieg	RSS Racing	Ford	54.752	164.408
2	17	William Byron (i)	Hendrick Motorsports	Chevrolet	54.964	163.744
3	7	Justin Allgaier	JR Motorsports	Chevrolet	54.973	163.717
Full practice results

== Qualifying ==
Qualifying was held on Saturday, July 13, at 10:30 AM ET. Standard intermediate track qualifying was in effect, although at Pocono and Indianapolis, a hybrid road course qualifying rule was used. The timing line was set in the North Straight, exiting Turn 2, where cars exited pit road, drove two-thirds of a lap, then took the green flag at the timing line exiting Turn 2, and completing their lap there the next time by. Teams then immediately pitted the car, meaning only two laps were run. In addition, up to three cars could be at the track at one time, separated by considerable intervals (about 20 seconds) to ensure drafting was prohibited.

Sheldon Creed, driving for Joe Gibbs Racing, would score the pole for the race, with a lap of 53.810, and a speed of 167.255 mph (269.171 km/h).

=== Qualifying results ===
Pos.	#	Driver	Team	Make	Time	Speed
1	18	Sheldon Creed	Joe Gibbs Racing	Toyota	53.810	167.255
2	9	Brandon Jones	JR Motorsports	Chevrolet	54.108	166.334
3	7	Justin Allgaier	JR Motorsports	Chevrolet	54.159	166.177
4	19	Taylor Gray (i)	Joe Gibbs Racing	Toyota	54.180	166.113
5	81	Chandler Smith	Joe Gibbs Racing	Toyota	54.305	165.731
6	17	William Byron (i)	Hendrick Motorsports	Chevrolet	54.331	165.651
7	39	Ryan Sieg	RSS Racing	Ford	54.362	165.557
8	00	Cole Custer	Stewart–Haas Racing	Ford	54.377	165.511
9	8	Sammy Smith	JR Motorsports	Chevrolet	54.380	165.502
10	16	A. J. Allmendinger	Kaulig Racing	Chevrolet	54.457	165.268
11	21	Austin Hill	Richard Childress Racing	Chevrolet	54.532	165.041
11	1	Sam Mayer	JR Motorsports	Chevrolet	54.556	164.968
12	31	Parker Retzlaff	Jordan Anderson Racing	Chevrolet	54.704	164.522
13	15	Josh Berry (i)	AM Racing	Ford	54.749	164.387
14	48	Parker Kligerman	Big Machine Racing	Chevrolet	54.838	164.120
15	5	Anthony Alfredo	Our Motorsports	Chevrolet	54.839	164.117
16	27	Jeb Burton	Jordan Anderson Racing	Chevrolet	54.856	164.066
17	98	Riley Herbst	Stewart–Haas Racing	Ford	54.881	163.991
19	2	Jesse Love (R)	Richard Childress Racing	Chevrolet	54.892	163.958
20	10	Daniel Dye (i)	Kaulig Racing	Chevrolet	54.908	163.911
21	91	Kyle Weatherman	DGM Racing	Chevrolet	55.007	163.616
22	11	Josh Williams	Kaulig Racing	Chevrolet	55.124	163.268
23	38	Matt DiBenedetto	RSS Racing	Ford	55.138	163.227
24	51	Jeremy Clements	Jeremy Clements Racing	Chevrolet	55.231	162.952
25	26	Corey Heim (i)	Sam Hunt Racing	Toyota	55.290	162.778
26	97	Shane van Gisbergen (R)	Kaulig Racing	Chevrolet	55.460	162.279
27	44	Brennan Poole	Alpha Prime Racing	Chevrolet	55.574	161.946
28	42	Leland Honeyman (R)	Young's Motorsports	Chevrolet	55.713	161.542
29	92	Josh Bilicki	DGM Racing	Chevrolet	55.793	161.311
30	43	Ryan Ellis	Alpha Prime Racing	Chevrolet	55.902	160.996
31	14	Mason Massey (i)	SS-Green Light Racing	Chevrolet	55.911	160.970
32	07	Patrick Emerling	SS-Green Light Racing	Chevrolet	55.944	160.875
33	28	Kyle Sieg	RSS Racing	Ford	55.954	160.846
Qualified by owner's points
34	20	Ryan Truex	Joe Gibbs Racing	Toyota	56.011	160.683
35	29	Blaine Perkins	RSS Racing	Ford	56.483	159.340
36	74	Dawson Cram (i)	Mike Harmon Racing	Chevrolet	56.569	159.098
36	4	Thomas Annunziata	JD Motorsports	Chevrolet	56.885	158.214
37	35	Stephen Mallozzi (i)	Joey Gase Motorsports	Chevrolet	58.550	153.715
Official qualifying results
Official starting lineup

== Race results ==
Stage 1 Laps: 20

Pos.	#	Driver	Team	Make	Pts
1	7	Justin Allgaier	JR Motorsports	Chevrolet	10
2	00	Cole Custer	Stewart-Haas Racing	Ford	9
3	81	Chandler Smith	Joe Gibbs Racing	Toyota	8
4	17	William Byron (i)	Hendrick Motorsports	Chevrolet	0
5	16	A. J. Allmendinger	Kaulig Racing	Chevrolet	6
6	21	Austin Hill	Richard Childress Racing	Chevrolet	5
7	98	Riley Herbst	Stewart-Haas Racing	Ford	4
8	39	Ryan Sieg	RSS Racing	Ford	3
9	8	Sammy Smith	JR Motorsports	Chevrolet	2
10	18	Sheldon Creed	Joe Gibbs Racing	Toyota	1

Stage 2 Laps: 20

Pos.	#	Driver	Team	Make	Pts
1	00	Cole Custer	Stewart-Haas Racing	Ford	10
2	81	Chandler Smith	Joe Gibbs Racing	Toyota	9
3	21	Austin Hill	Richard Childress Racing	Chevrolet	8
4	98	Riley Herbst	Stewart-Haas Racing	Ford	7
5	39	Ryan Sieg	RSS Racing	Ford	6
6	16	A. J. Allmendinger	Kaulig Racing	Chevrolet	5
7	18	Sheldon Creed	Joe Gibbs Racing	Toyota	4
8	8	Sammy Smith	JR Motorsports	Chevrolet	3
9	26	Corey Heim (i)	Sam Hunt Racing	Toyota	0
10	7	Justin Allgaier	JR Motorsports	Chevrolet	1

Stage 3 Laps: 52

Pos.	St.	#	Driver	Team	Make	Laps	Led	Status	Pts
1	8	00	Cole Custer	Stewart-Haas Racing	Ford	90	25	Running	59
2	3	7	Justin Allgaier	JR Motorsports	Chevrolet	90	30	Running	46
3	4	17	William Byron (i)	Hendrick Motorsports	Chevrolet	90	16	Running	0
4	1	18	Sheldon Creed	Joe Gibbs Racing	Toyota	90	7	Running	38
5	4	19	Taylor Gray (i)	Joe Gibbs Racing	Toyota	90	0	Running	0
6	10	16	A. J. Allmendinger	Kaulig Racing	Chevrolet	90	0	Running	42
7	11	21	Austin Hill	Richard Childress Racing	Chevrolet	90	1	Running	43
8	14	48	Parker Kilgerman	Big Machine Racing	Chevrolet	90	0	Running	29
9	9	8	Sammy Smith	JR Motorsports	Chevrolet	90	0	Running	33
10	11	1	Sam Mayer	JR Motorsports	Chevrolet	90	0	Running	27
11	17	98	Riley Herbst	Stewart–Haas Racing	Ford	90	0	Running	37
12	7	39	Ryan Seig	RSS Racing	Ford	90	4	Running	34
13	2	9	Brandon Jones	JR Motorsports	Chevrolet	90	0	Running	24
14	15	5	Anthony Alfredo	Our Motorsports	Chevrolet	90	0	Running	23
15	5	81	Chandler Smith	Joe Gibbs Racing	Toyota	90	0	Running	39
16	25	26	Corey Heim (i)	Sam Hunt Racing	Toyota	90	0	Running	0
17	20	10	Daniel Dye (i)	Kaulig Racing	Chevrolet	90	0	Running	0
18	22	11	Josh Williams	Kaulig Racing	Chevrolet	90	0	Running	19
19	34	20	Ryan Truex	Joe Gibbs Racing	Toyota	90	0	Running	18
20	33	28	Kyle Sieg	RSS Racing	Ford	90	0	Running	17
21	16	27	Jeb Burton	Jordan Anderson Racing	Chevrolet	90	0	Running	16
22	19	2	Jesse Love (R)	Richard Childress Racing	Chevrolet	90	7	Running	15
23	21	91	Kyle Weatherman	DGM Racing	Chevrolet	90	0	Running	14
24	23	38	Matt DiBenedetto	RSS Racing	Ford	90	0	Running	13
25	28	42	Leland Honeyman (R)	Young's Motorsports	Chevrolet	90	0	Running	12
26	27	44	Brennan Poole	Alpha Prime Racing	Chevrolet	90	0	Running	11
27	13	15	Josh Berry (i)	AM Racing	Ford	90	0	Running	0
28	36	4	Thomas Annunziata	JD Motorsports	Chevrolet	90	0	Running	9
29	31	14	Mason Massey (i)	SS-Green Light Racing	Chevrolet	90	0	Running	0
30	24	51	Jeremy Clements	Jeremy Clements Racing	Chevrolet	90	0	Running	7
31	26	97	Shane van Gisbergen (R)	Kaulig Racing	Chevrolet	90	0	Running	6
32	12	31	Parker Retzlaff	Jorden Anderson Racing	Chevrolet	89	0	Running	5
33	32	07	Patrick Emerling	SS-Green Light Racing	Chevrolet	89	0	Running	4
34	35	29	Blaine Perkins	RSS Racing	Ford	72	0	Suspension	3
35	37	35	Stephen Mallozzi (i)	Joey Gase Motorsports	Chevrolet	68	0	Engine	0
36	30	43	Ryan Ellis	Alpha Prime Racing	Chevrolet	47	0	Accident	1
37	29	92	Josh Bilicki	DGM Racing	Chevrolet	8	0	Electrical	1
38	34	74	Dawson Cram (i)	Mike Harmon Racing	Chevrolet	1	0	Accident	0

== Standings after the race ==
Drivers' Championship standings

	Pos	Driver	Points
	1	Cole Custer	716
	2	Justin Allgaier	665 (-51)
	3	Chandler Smith	657 (–59)
	4	Austin Hill	640 (–76)
2	5	A. J. Allmendinger	564 (–154)
1	6	Jesse Love	563 (–153)
2	7	Riley Herbst	560 (–156)
	8	Sheldon Creed	543 (–173)
	9	Parker Kligerman	524 (–192)
	10	Sam Mayer	501 (–215)
1	11	Sammy Smith	488 (–228)
1	12	Ryan Sieg	466 (–250)
Official driver's standings

Manufacturers' Championship standings

Pos	Manufacturer	Points
1	Chevrolet	597
2	Toyota	574 (-23)
3	Ford	504 (–93)

- Note: Only the first 12 positions are included for the driver standings.

Previous race: 2024 The Loop 110	NASCAR Xfinity Series; 2024 season	Next race: 2024 Pennzoil 250
