= Jake Garcia =

American racing driver (born 2005)

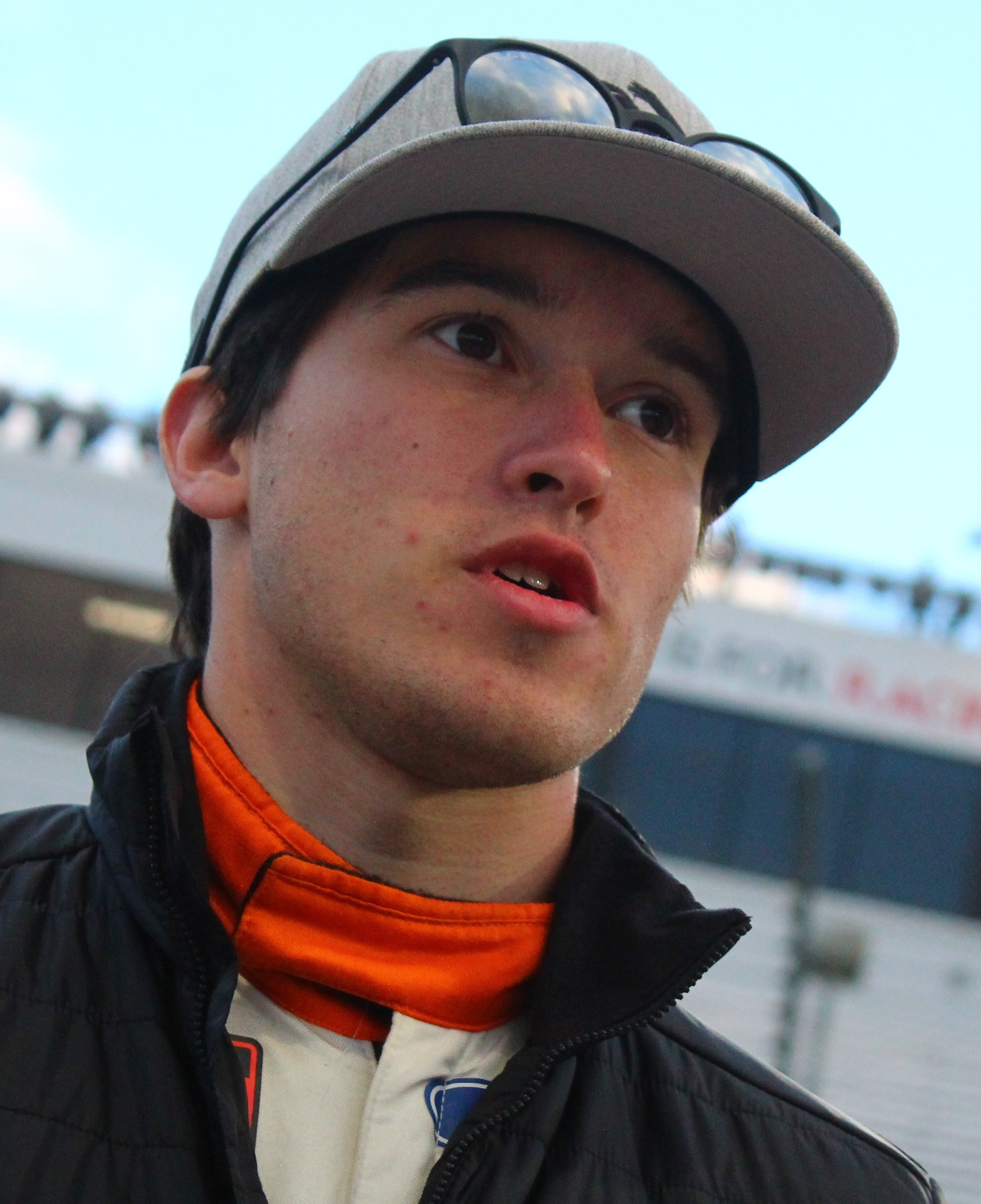
- Garcia at Martinsville Speedway in 2024
- Born: Jake Garcia; March 3, 2005 (age 21); Monroe, Georgia, U.S.
- Achievements: 2021 Southern Super Series Champion; 2024 All American 400 Winner; 2023 North-South Challenge Winner

NASCAR FedEx Freight Truck Series career
- 100 races run over 5 years
- Truck no., team: No. 38 (Front Row Motorsports)
- 2026 position: 11th
- Best finish: 10th (2025)
- First race: 2022 Toyota 200 (Gateway)
- Last race: 2026 Craftsman 200 (Homestead)
- First win: 2026 UNOH 250 (Bristol)
Wins	Top tens	Poles
1	30	5

ARCA Menards Series West career
- 1 race run over 1 year
- Best finish: 46th (2021)
- First race: 2021 Arizona Lottery 100 (Phoenix)
Wins	Top tens	Poles
0	1	0
- Statistics up to date as of November 6, 2026.

Jake Garcia (born March 3, 2005) is an American professional stock car racing driver. He competes full-time in the NASCAR Truck Series, driving the No. 38 Ford F-150 for Front Row Motorsports.

== Racing career ==
Garcia made his midget racing debut in 2016, driving in the USAC Eastern Midget Series. He raced in midget cars for three years, and made his first late model debut in 2018 for the Champion Racing Association. He would continue running late model races in 2019, where he won the track championship at Five Flags Speedway in pro late models. In 2020, he ran full time in the Southern Super Series, and won Rookie of the Year honors. He would win the championship a year later, making him the youngest champion in the series at sixteen years old. He would continue to have success in late model racing. He also competed in CARS Tour.

=== ARCA Menards Series West ===
On October 26, 2021, Garcia would sign with David Gilliland Racing and would drive in the final race of the 2021 ARCA Menards Series West at Phoenix Raceway. He started 4th and finished 6th.

=== NASCAR Craftsman Truck Series ===
==== 2022 ====
On March 16, 2022, McAnally–Hilgemann Racing announced that Garcia would drive five races for the team in the 2022 NASCAR Camping World Truck Series, starting at Martinsville Speedway on April 7. The number would be 35, which is his late model number. However, qualifying was rained out, and since the No. 35 team didn't have any points, Garcia failed to make the race. Garcia made his Truck debut at Gateway Motorsports Park on June 4, 2022. He ran around midpack until a collision with Tanner Gray put him multiple laps down. He finished 29th.

==== 2023 ====
On December 6, 2022, McAnally–Hilgemann Racing announced that Garcia would run full-time for the team in 2023, continuing to run the No. 35 truck. Because of age restrictions, Garcia missed the season-opener race at Daytona. NASCAR granted him a waiver that will still make him eligible for the playoffs. In his first race of the season at Las Vegas, he scored his first career top-ten. He scored seven top-tens throughout the regular season, but failed to make the playoffs. On October 16, it was announced that Garcia would not return to McAnally–Hilgemann Racing for the 2024 season and would be seeking new opportunities. Garcia finished his rookie year thirteenth in the final standings.

==== 2024 ====
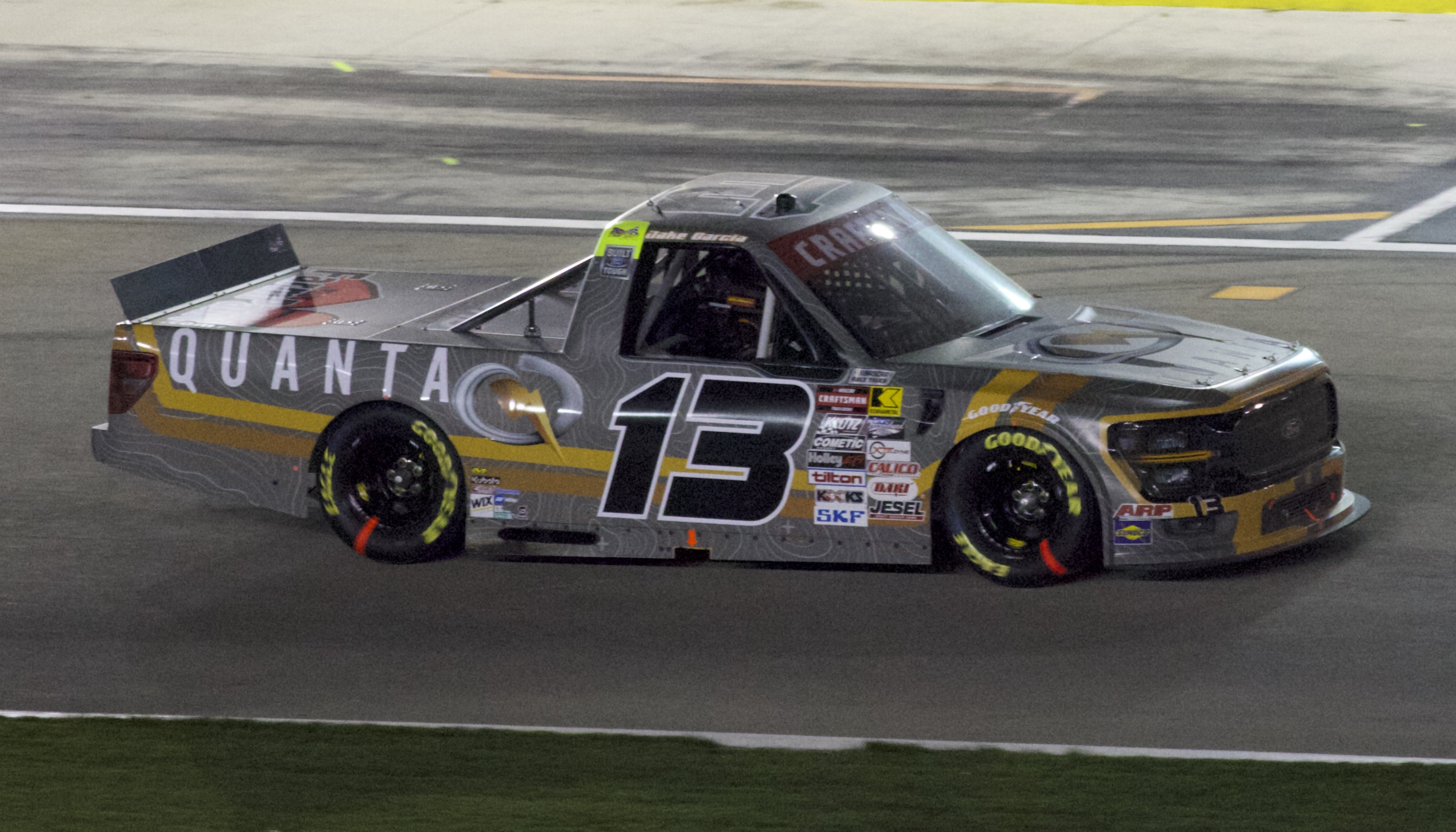
Garcia's No. 13 truck at Las Vegas Motor Speedway in 2024.

On November 15, 2023, it was announced that Garcia will move to ThorSport Racing for the 2024 season, driving the No. 13, replacing Hailie Deegan, who moved up to the Xfinity Series full-time. Garcia struggled throughout the season, only scoring two top-ten finishes, his best being a sixth place at Charlotte. Garcia finished the season seventeenth in the standings.

==== 2025 ====
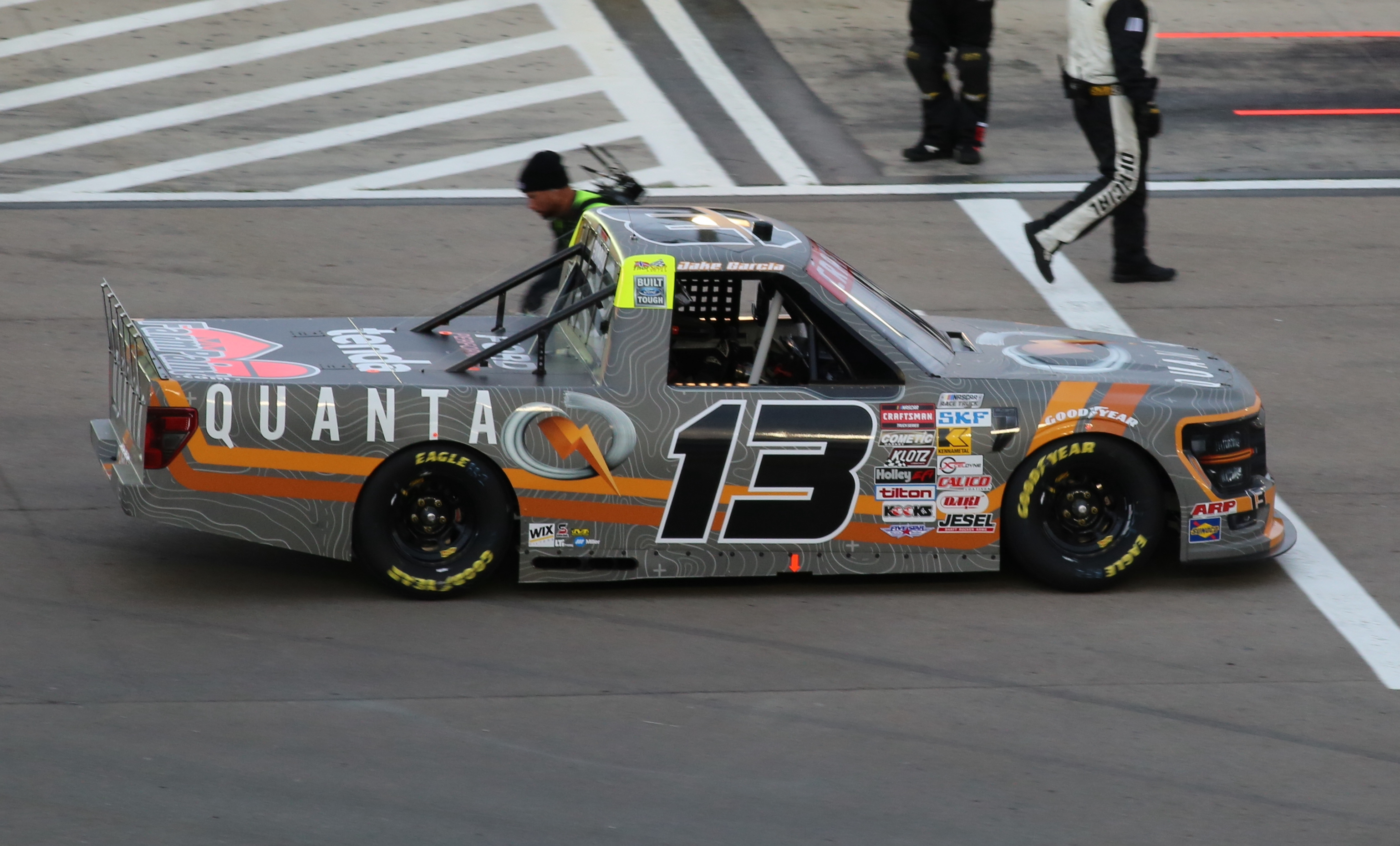
Garcia's No. 13 truck at Las Vegas Motor Speedway in 2025.

Garcia started the 2025 season with a twelfth-place finish at Daytona. At Rockingham, Garcia would earn his first career pole. Garcia was able to qualify for the Playoffs, his first career appearance, but would be eliminated in the first round.

==== 2026 ====
Garcia started the 2026 season with a 32nd-place finish at Daytona. After failing to make The Chase, Garcia got his first career win at Bristol.

==== 2027 ====
On September 29, 2026, it was announced that Garcia will join Front Row Motorsports to run their No. 38 truck in the 2027 season, replacing Chandler Smith as he moved up to the NASCAR O'Reilly Auto Parts Series.

=== NASCAR Xfinity Series ===
On April 20, 2025, it was revealed that Garcia would attempt to make his NASCAR Xfinity Series debut at Talladega Superspeedway, driving the No. 29 Ford for RSS Racing. Unfortunately, Garcia failed to qualify and he has not attempted since in that season.

== Personal life ==
Garcia attended Athens Academy and graduated in the class of 2023.

== Motorsports career results ==
=== Racing career summary ===
Season	Series	Team	Races	Wins	Top 5	Top 10	Points	Position
2020	CARS Super Late Model Tour	Jake Garcia	5	0	3	5	140	7th
2021	CARS Super Late Model Tour	Jake Garcia	4	0	3	3	60	12th
2021	ARCA Menards Series West	David Gilliland Racing	1	0	0	1	39	46th
2022	CARS Pro Late Model Tour	N/A	1	1	1	1	34	30th
2022	NASCAR Camping World Truck Series	McAnally-Hilgemann Racing	5	0	0	0	70	41st
2023	ASA STARS National Tour	Jake Racing	2	0	0	0	99	40th
2023	NASCAR Craftsman Truck Series	McAnally-Hilgemann Racing	22	0	3	9	534	13th
2024	ASA STARS National Tour	Marcus Barela	2	1	1	1	109	27th
2024	NASCAR Craftsman Truck Series	ThorSport Racing	23	0	0	2	459	17th
2025	ASA STARS National Tour	Marcus Barela	3	0	2	2	180	23rd
2025	NASCAR Craftsman Truck Series	ThorSport Racing	25	0	2	10	2148	10th
2026	ASA STARS National Tour	Marcus Barela	2	0	1	1	98*	31st*
2026	NASCAR Craftsman Truck Series	ThorSport Racing	25	1	2	10	614	11th

=== NASCAR ===
(key) (Bold – Pole position awarded by qualifying time. Italics – Pole position earned by points standings or practice time. * – Most laps led. ** – All laps led.)

==== Xfinity Series ====
NASCAR Xfinity Series results
Year	Team	No.	Make	1	2	3	4	5	6	7	8	9	10	11	12	13	14	15	16	17	18	19	20	21	22	23	24	25	26	27	28	29	30	31	32	33	NXSC	Pts	Ref
2025	RSS Racing	29	Ford	DAY	ATL	COA	PHO	LVS	HOM	MAR	DAR	BRI	CAR	TAL; DNQ	TEX	CLT	NSH	MXC	POC	ATL	CSC	SON	DOV	IND	IOW	GLN	DAY	PIR	GTW	BRI	KAN	ROV	LVS	TAL	MAR	PHO	103rd	0^{1}	

==== Truck Series ====
NASCAR Truck Series results
Year	Team	No.	Make	1	2	3	4	5	6	7	8	9	10	11	12	13	14	15	16	17	18	19	20	21	22	23	24	25	NTSC	Pts	Ref
2022	McAnally–Hilgemann Racing	35	Chevy	DAY	LVS	ATL	COA	MAR; DNQ	BRD	DAR	KAN	TEX	CLT	GTW; 29	SON	KNX	NSH	MOH	POC	IRP; 28	RCH; 20	KAN	BRI; 22	TAL	HOM	PHO; 16			41st	70	
2023	McAnally–Hilgemann Racing	35	Chevy	DAY	LVS; 10	ATL; 18	COA; 19	TEX; 5	BRD; 6	MAR; 13	KAN; 8	DAR; 26	NWS; 23	CLT; 15	GTW; 10	NSH; 10	MOH; 16	POC; 35	RCH; 4	IRP; 13	MLW; 9	KAN; 11	BRI; 11	TAL; 29	HOM; 15	PHO; 2			13th	534	
2024	ThorSport Racing	13	Ford	DAY; 34	ATL; 16	LVS; 11	BRI; 14	COA; 14	MAR; 21	TEX; 19	KAN; 17	DAR; 20	NWS; 21	CLT; 6	GTW; 24	NSH; 10	POC; 21	IRP; 30	RCH; 13	MLW; 21	BRI; 21	KAN; 21	TAL; 29	HOM; 24	MAR; 20	PHO; 14			17th	459	
2025	ThorSport Racing	13	Ford	DAY; 12	ATL; 9	LVS; 26	HOM; 7	MAR; 3	BRI; 7	**CAR**; 2	TEX; 21	**KAN**; 7	NWS; 12	CLT; 11	NSH; 12	MCH; 7	POC; 28	LRP; 24	IRP; 15	GLN; 15	RCH; 7	DAR; 10	**BRI**; 33	NHA; 16	ROV; 23	TAL; 29	MAR; 18	PHO; 6	10th	2148	
2026	ThorSport Racing	98	Ford	DAY; 32	**ATL**; 7	STP; 18	DAR; 23	**CAR**; 9	BRI; 6	TEX; 29	GLN; 11	DOV; 9	CLT; 13	NSH; 32	MCH; 9	COR; 32	LRP; 22	NWS; 13	IRP; 21	RCH; 6	NHA; 14	BRI; 1	KAN; 9	CLT; 29	PHO; 5	TAL; 26	MAR; 13	HOM; 8	11th	614	
2027	Front Row Motorsports	38	Ford	DAY	ATL	STP	DAR	BRI	TEX	KAN	NWS	CLT	NSS	POC	MCH	LRP	ATL	IRP	BRI	BGS	MSP	NHA	KAN	CLT	PHO	TAL	MAR	HOM			

^{*} Season still in progress
^{1} Ineligible for series points

==== ARCA Menards Series West ====
ARCA Menards Series West results
Year	Team	No.	Make	1	2	3	4	5	6	7	8	9	AMSWC	Pts	Ref
2021	David Gilliland Racing	45	Ford	PHO	SON	IRW	CNS	IRW	PIR	LVS	AAS	PHO; 6	46th	39	

=== CARS Super Late Model Tour ===
(key)

CARS Super Late Model Tour results
Year	Team	No.	Make	1	2	3	4	5	6	7	8	CSLMTC	Pts	Ref
2020	Jake Garcia	35	Ford	SNM	HCY; 9	JEN; 3	HCY					7th	140	
2020	Jake Garcia	35G	Ford					FCS; 4	BRI; 5*	FLC	NSH; 6	7th	140	
2021	Jake Garcia	35G	Ford	HCY	GPS; 15				MMS; 2	TCM; 4	SBO	12th	60	
2021	Jake Garcia	35	Ford			NSH; 4	JEN	HCY				12th	60	

=== CARS Pro Late Model Tour ===
(key)

CARS Pro Late Model Tour results
Year	Team	No.	Make	1	2	3	4	5	6	7	8	9	10	11	12	CPLMTC	Pts	Ref
2022	N/A	35G	Chevy	CRW	HCY	GPS	FCS	TCM	HCY	ACE	MMS	TCM; 1	ACE	SBO	CRW	30th	34	

=== ASA STARS National Tour ===
(key) (Bold – Pole position awarded by qualifying time. Italics – Pole position earned by points standings or practice time. * – Most laps led. ** – All laps led.)

ASA STARS National Tour results
Year	Team	No.	Make	1	2	3	4	5	6	7	8	9	10	11	12	ASNTC	Pts	Ref
2023	Jake Racing	35	Toyota	FIF	MAD	NWS	HCY	MLW	AND	WIR	TOL	WIN; 11				40th	99	
2023	Jake Racing	35	Chevy										NSV; 19			40th	99	
2024	Marcus Barela	35G	Ford	NSM	FIF	HCY	MAD	MLW	AND	OWO	TOL	WIN; 15	NSV; 1			27th	109	
2025	Marcus Barela	35	Ford	NSM	FIF; 2	DOM; 3	HCY	NPS	MAD	SLG	AND	OWO	TOL	WIN; 17	NSV; DNS	23rd	180	
2026	Marcus Barela	35	Ford	NSM	FIF; 4	HCY	SLG	MAD	NPS	OWO	TRI	WIN	NSV; 15	NSM		-*	-*	
