= 2025 Weather Guard Truck Race =

6th race of the 2025 NASCAR Craftsman Truck Series

Race details
- Race 6 of 25 of the 2025 NASCAR Craftsman Truck Series
- Date: April 11, 2025
- Official name: 5th Annual Weather Guard Truck Race
- Location: Bristol Motor Speedway in Bristol, Tennessee
- Course: Permanent racing facility
- Course length: 0.533 miles (0.858 km)
- Distance: 250 laps, 133 mi (214 km)
- Scheduled distance: 250 laps, 133 mi (214 km)
- Average speed: 72.320 mph (116.388 km/h)

Pole position
Driver	Daniel Hemric	McAnally-Hilgemann Racing
- Grid positions set by competition-based formula

Most laps led
Driver	Chandler Smith	Front Row Motorsports
- Laps: 127

Winner
No. 38	Chandler Smith	Front Row Motorsports

Television in the United States
- Network: FS1
- Announcers: Jamie Little, Joey Logano, and Michael Waltrip

Radio in the United States
- Radio: NRN

The 2025 Weather Guard Truck Race was the 6th stock car race of the 2025 NASCAR Craftsman Truck Series, and the 5th iteration of the event. The race was held on Friday, April 11, 2025, at Bristol Motor Speedway in Bristol, Tennessee, a 0.533 miles (0.858 km) permanent asphalt oval shaped short track. The race took the scheduled 250 laps to complete.

Chandler Smith, driving for Front Row Motorsports, held off a charging Kyle Larson in the final closing laps to earn his sixth career NASCAR Craftsman Truck Series win, and his first of the season. Smith was also the most dominant driver of the race, winning the first stage and leading a race-high 127 laps. To fill out the podium, Larson, driving for Spire Motorsports, and Corey Heim, driving for Tricon Garage, finished second and third, respectively.

This was also the second race of the Triple Truck Challenge. Smith won the race and was granted the $50,000 bonus cash.

== Report ==
=== Background ===
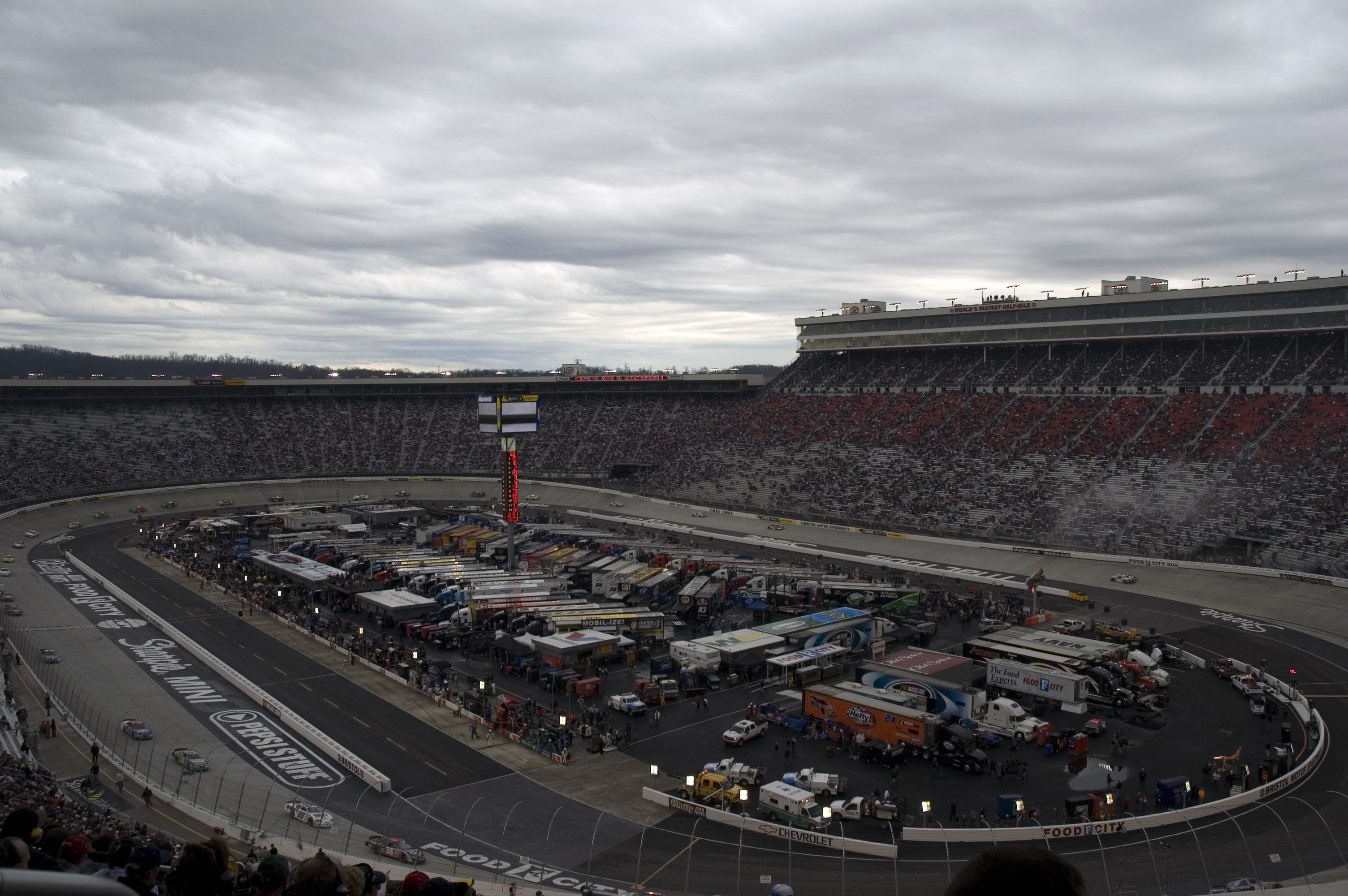
Bristol Motor Speedway, the track where the race was held.

Bristol Motor Speedway, formerly known as Bristol International Raceway and Bristol Raceway, is a NASCAR short track venue located in Bristol, Tennessee. Constructed in 1960, it held its first NASCAR race on July 30, 1961. Bristol is among the most popular tracks on the NASCAR schedule because of its distinct features, which include extraordinarily steep banking combined with short length, an all concrete surface, two pit roads, and stadium-like seating.

In 2021, the race shifted to a dirt surface version of the track and was renamed the Food City Dirt Race. After the 2023 event, the race would return to being run on concrete to replace the dirt surface.

==== Entry list ====
- (R) denotes rookie driver.
- (i) denotes driver who is ineligible for series driver points.

#	Driver	Team	Make
1	Brandon Jones (i)	Tricon Garage	Toyota
02	Nathan Byrd	Young's Motorsports	Chevrolet
2	Stephen Mallozzi	Reaume Brothers Racing	Ford
5	Toni Breidinger (R)	Tricon Garage	Toyota
6	Norm Benning	Norm Benning Racing	Chevrolet
07	Kyle Larson (i)	Spire Motorsports	Chevrolet
7	Corey Day (i)	Spire Motorsports	Chevrolet
9	Grant Enfinger	CR7 Motorsports	Chevrolet
11	Corey Heim	Tricon Garage	Toyota
13	Jake Garcia	ThorSport Racing	Ford
15	Tanner Gray	Tricon Garage	Toyota
17	Gio Ruggiero (R)	Tricon Garage	Toyota
18	Tyler Ankrum	McAnally-Hilgemann Racing	Chevrolet
19	Daniel Hemric	McAnally-Hilgemann Racing	Chevrolet
22	Tyler Tomassi (i)	Reaume Brothers Racing	Ford
26	Dawson Sutton (R)	Rackley W.A.R.	Chevrolet
33	Frankie Muniz (R)	Reaume Brothers Racing	Ford
34	Layne Riggs	Front Row Motorsports	Ford
38	Chandler Smith	Front Row Motorsports	Ford
42	Matt Mills	Niece Motorsports	Chevrolet
44	Bayley Currey	Niece Motorsports	Chevrolet
45	Kaden Honeycutt	Niece Motorsports	Chevrolet
52	Stewart Friesen	Halmar Friesen Racing	Toyota
66	Luke Fenhaus	ThorSport Racing	Ford
71	Rajah Caruth	Spire Motorsports	Chevrolet
75	Parker Kligerman	Henderson Motorsports	Chevrolet
76	Spencer Boyd	Freedom Racing Enterprises	Chevrolet
77	Andrés Pérez de Lara (R)	Spire Motorsports	Chevrolet
81	Connor Mosack (R)	McAnally-Hilgemann Racing	Chevrolet
84	Patrick Staropoli (i)	Cook Racing Technologies	Toyota
88	Matt Crafton	ThorSport Racing	Ford
90	Justin Carroll	TC Motorsports	Toyota
91	Jack Wood	McAnally-Hilgemann Racing	Chevrolet
98	Ty Majeski	ThorSport Racing	Ford
99	Ben Rhodes	ThorSport Racing	Ford
Official entry list

== Starting lineup ==
Practice and qualifying were originally scheduled to be held on Friday, April 11, at 3:35 PM and 4:40 PM EST, but were both cancelled due to constant rain showers. The starting lineup would be determined per the NASCAR rulebook. As a result, Daniel Hemric, driving for McAnally-Hilgemann Racing, will start on the pole.

No drivers would fail to qualify.

=== Starting lineup ===
Pos.	#	Driver	Team	Make
1	19	Daniel Hemric	McAnally-Hilgemann Racing	Chevrolet
2	18	Tyler Ankrum	McAnally-Hilgemann Racing	Chevrolet
3	38	Chandler Smith	Front Row Motorsports	Ford
4	11	Corey Heim	Tricon Garage	Toyota
5	13	Jake Garcia	ThorSport Racing	Ford
6	99	Ben Rhodes	ThorSport Racing	Ford
7	52	Stewart Friesen	Halmar Friesen Racing	Toyota
8	98	Ty Majeski	ThorSport Racing	Ford
9	34	Layne Riggs	Front Row Motorsports	Ford
10	77	Andrés Pérez de Lara (R)	Spire Motorsports	Chevrolet
11	07	Kyle Larson (i)	Spire Motorsports	Chevrolet
12	71	Rajah Caruth	Spire Motorsports	Chevrolet
13	1	Brandon Jones (i)	Tricon Garage	Toyota
14	17	Gio Ruggiero (R)	Tricon Garage	Toyota
15	42	Matt Mills	Niece Motorsports	Chevrolet
16	26	Dawson Sutton (R)	Rackley W.A.R.	Chevrolet
17	15	Tanner Gray	Tricon Garage	Toyota
18	76	Spencer Boyd	Freedom Racing Enterprises	Chevrolet
19	91	Jack Wood	McAnally-Hilgemann Racing	Chevrolet
20	44	Bayley Currey	Niece Motorsports	Chevrolet
21	66	Luke Fenhaus	ThorSport Racing	Ford
22	45	Kaden Honeycutt	Niece Motorsports	Chevrolet
23	90	Justin Carroll	TC Motorsports	Toyota
24	9	Grant Enfinger	CR7 Motorsports	Chevrolet
25	81	Connor Mosack (R)	McAnally-Hilgemann Racing	Chevrolet
26	84	Patrick Staropoli (i)	Cook Racing Technologies	Toyota
27	88	Matt Crafton	ThorSport Racing	Ford
28	5	Toni Breidinger (R)	Tricon Garage	Toyota
29	7	Corey Day (i)	Spire Motorsports	Chevrolet
30	02	Nathan Byrd	Young's Motorsports	Chevrolet
31	22	Tyler Tomassi (i)	Reaume Brothers Racing	Ford
Qualified by owner's points
32	2	Stephen Mallozzi	Reaume Brothers Racing	Ford
33	33	Frankie Muniz (R)	Reaume Brothers Racing	Ford
34	6	Norm Benning	Norm Benning Racing	Chevrolet
35	75	Parker Kligerman	Henderson Motorsports	Chevrolet
Official starting lineup

== Race results ==
Stage 1 Laps: 65

Pos.	#	Driver	Team	Make	Pts
1	38	Chandler Smith	Front Row Motorsports	Ford	10
2	99	Ben Rhodes	ThorSport Racing	Ford	9
3	18	Tyler Ankrum	McAnally-Hilgemann Racing	Chevrolet	8
4	34	Layne Riggs	Front Row Motorsports	Ford	7
5	19	Daniel Hemric	McAnally-Hilgemann Racing	Chevrolet	6
6	07	Kyle Larson (i)	Spire Motorsports	Chevrolet	0
7	88	Matt Crafton	ThorSport Racing	Ford	4
8	7	Corey Day (i)	Spire Motorsports	Chevrolet	0
9	13	Jake Garcia	ThorSport Racing	Ford	2
10	71	Rajah Caruth	Spire Motorsports	Chevrolet	1

Stage 2 Laps: 65

Pos.	#	Driver	Team	Make	Pts
1	44	Bayley Currey	Niece Motorsports	Chevrolet	10
2	38	Chandler Smith	Front Row Motorsports	Ford	9
3	45	Kaden Honeycutt	Niece Motorsports	Chevrolet	8
4	11	Corey Heim	Tricon Garage	Toyota	7
5	15	Tanner Gray	Tricon Garage	Toyota	6
6	18	Tyler Ankrum	McAnally-Hilgemann Racing	Chevrolet	5
7	88	Matt Crafton	ThorSport Racing	Ford	4
8	13	Jake Garcia	ThorSport Racing	Ford	3
9	99	Ben Rhodes	ThorSport Racing	Ford	2
10	7	Corey Day (i)	Spire Motorsports	Chevrolet	0

Stage 3 Laps: 120

Fin	St	#	Driver	Team	Make	Laps	Led	Status	Pts
1	3	38	Chandler Smith	Front Row Motorsports	Ford	250	127	Running	59
2	11	07	Kyle Larson (i)	Spire Motorsports	Chevrolet	250	0	Running	0
3	4	11	Corey Heim	Tricon Garage	Toyota	250	16	Running	41
4	2	18	Tyler Ankrum	McAnally-Hilgemann Racing	Chevrolet	250	0	Running	46
5	6	99	Ben Rhodes	ThorSport Racing	Ford	250	0	Running	43
6	9	34	Layne Riggs	Front Row Motorsports	Ford	250	0	Running	38
7	5	13	Jake Garcia	ThorSport Racing	Ford	250	0	Running	35
8	22	45	Kaden Honeycutt	Niece Motorsports	Chevrolet	250	0	Running	37
9	12	71	Rajah Caruth	Spire Motorsports	Chevrolet	250	85	Running	29
10	14	17	Gio Ruggiero (R)	Tricon Garage	Toyota	250	0	Running	27
11	19	91	Jack Wood	McAnally-Hilgemann Racing	Chevrolet	250	0	Running	26
12	24	9	Grant Enfinger	CR7 Motorsports	Chevrolet	250	0	Running	25
13	1	19	Daniel Hemric	McAnally-Hilgemann Racing	Chevrolet	250	8	Running	30
14	35	75	Parker Kligerman	Henderson Motorsports	Chevrolet	250	0	Running	23
15	29	7	Corey Day (i)	Spire Motorsports	Chevrolet	250	0	Running	0
16	27	88	Matt Crafton	ThorSport Racing	Ford	250	0	Running	29
17	16	26	Dawson Sutton (R)	Rackley W.A.R.	Chevrolet	250	0	Running	20
18	17	15	Tanner Gray	Tricon Garage	Toyota	250	0	Running	25
19	10	77	Andrés Pérez de Lara (R)	Spire Motorsports	Chevrolet	250	0	Running	18
20	15	42	Matt Mills	Niece Motorsports	Chevrolet	249	0	Running	17
21	31	22	Tyler Tomassi (i)	Reaume Brothers Racing	Ford	246	0	Running	0
22	21	66	Luke Fenhaus	ThorSport Racing	Ford	243	0	Running	15
23	20	44	Bayley Currey	Niece Motorsports	Chevrolet	237	14	Suspension	24
24	25	81	Connor Mosack (R)	McAnally-Hilgemann Racing	Chevrolet	234	0	Running	13
25	28	5	Toni Breidinger (R)	Tricon Garage	Toyota	227	0	Running	12
26	23	90	Justin Carroll	TC Motorsports	Toyota	222	0	Running	11
27	7	52	Stewart Friesen	Halmar Friesen Racing	Toyota	201	0	Suspension	10
28	30	02	Nathan Byrd	Young's Motorsports	Chevrolet	155	0	Brakes	9
29	26	84	Patrick Staropoli (i)	Cook Racing Technologies	Toyota	107	0	Transmission	0
30	18	76	Spencer Boyd	Freedom Racing Enterprises	Chevrolet	77	0	Handling	7
31	33	33	Frankie Muniz (R)	Reaume Brothers Racing	Ford	76	0	DVP	6
32	13	1	Brandon Jones (i)	Tricon Garage	Toyota	53	0	Accident	0
33	8	98	Ty Majeski	ThorSport Racing	Ford	52	0	Accident	4
34	34	6	Norm Benning	Norm Benning Racing	Chevrolet	35	0	Handling	3
35	32	2	Stephen Mallozzi	Reaume Brothers Racing	Ford	4	0	Electrical	2
Official race results

== Standings after the race ==
Drivers' Championship standings

	Pos	Driver	Points
	1	Corey Heim	270
1	2	Chandler Smith	252 (-18)
1	3	Ty Majeski	213 (–57)
2	4	Tyler Ankrum	210 (–60)
1	5	Daniel Hemric	205 (–65)
2	6	Layne Riggs	186 (–84)
	7	Grant Enfinger	182 (–88)
3	8	Stewart Friesen	177 (–93)
1	9	Ben Rhodes	174 (–96)
1	10	Jake Garcia	172 (–98)
Official driver's standings

Manufacturers' Championship standings

Pos	Manufacturer	Points
1	Chevrolet	223
2	Toyota	214 (-9)
3	Ford	208 (–15)

- Note: Only the first 10 positions are included for the driver standings.

Previous race: 2025 Boys & Girls Club of the Blue Ridge 200	NASCAR Craftsman Truck Series; 2025 season	Next race: 2025 Black's Tire 200
