= 2024 Heart of America 200 =

8th race of the 2024 NASCAR Craftsman Truck Series

Race details
- Race 8 of 23 of the 2024 NASCAR Craftsman Truck Series
- Date: May 4, 2024
- Official name: 24th Annual Heart of America 200
- Location: Kansas Speedway in Kansas City, Kansas
- Course: Permanent racing facility
- Course length: 1.5 miles (2.4 km)
- Distance: 134 laps, 201 mi (323 km)
- Scheduled distance: 134 laps, 201 mi (323 km)
- Average speed: 132.722 mph (213.595 km/h)

Pole position
Driver	Chase Purdy	Spire Motorsports
- Time: 30.728

Most laps led
Driver	Corey Heim	Tricon Garage
- Laps: 79

Winner
No. 11	Corey Heim	Tricon Garage

Television in the United States
- Network: FS1
- Announcers: Adam Alexander, Phil Parsons, Michael Waltrip, and Carson Hocevar

Radio in the United States
- Radio: MRN

The 2024 Heart of America 200 was the 8th stock car race of the 2024 NASCAR Craftsman Truck Series, and the 24th iteration of the event. The race was held on Saturday, May 4, 2024, at Kansas Speedway in Kansas City, Kansas, a 1.5 miles (2.4 km) permanent asphalt quad-oval shaped intermediate speedway. The race took the scheduled 134 laps to complete. Corey Heim, driving for Tricon Garage, would cruise to a dominating victory, winning the first stage and leading a race-high 79 laps, eventually holding off a charging Zane Smith in the final few laps to earn his seventh career NASCAR Craftsman Truck Series win, and his second of the season. To fill out the podium, Christian Eckes, driving for McAnally-Hilgemann Racing, would finish 3rd, respectively.

== Report ==
=== Background ===
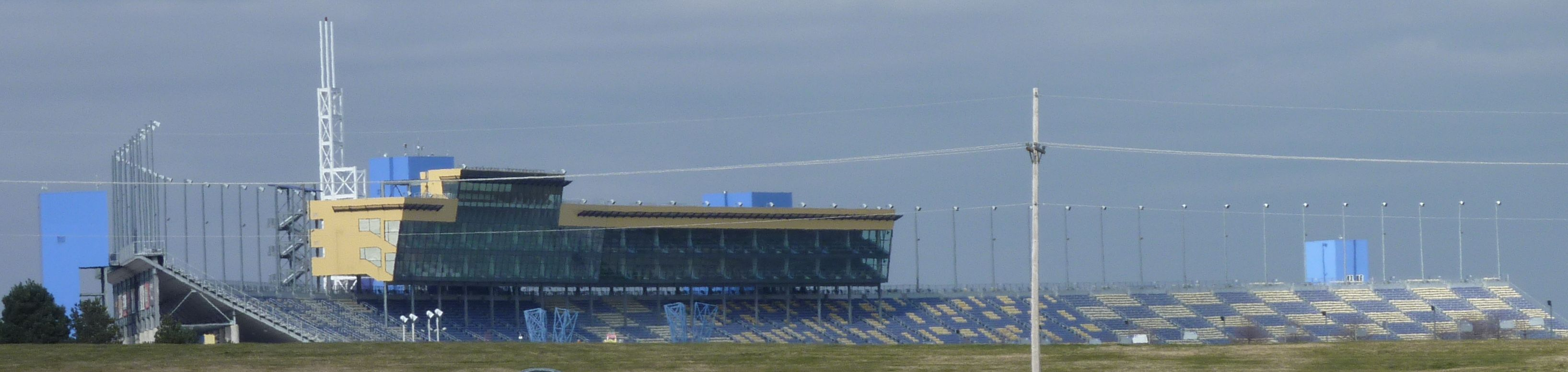
The layout of Kansas Speedway, the circuit where the race will be held.

Kansas Speedway is a 1.5-mile (2.4 km) tri-oval race track in Kansas City, Kansas. It was built in 2001 and hosts two annual NASCAR race weekends. The NTT IndyCar Series also raced there until 2011. The speedway is owned and operated by the International Speedway Corporation.

==== Entry list ====
- (R) denotes rookie driver.
- (i) denotes driver who is ineligible for series driver points.

#	Driver	Team	Make
1	Brett Moffitt	Tricon Garage	Toyota
02	Mason Massey	Young's Motorsports	Chevrolet
2	Nick Sanchez	Rev Racing	Chevrolet
5	Dean Thompson	Tricon Garage	Toyota
7	Connor Mosack	Spire Motorsports	Chevrolet
9	Grant Enfinger	CR7 Motorsports	Chevrolet
10	Jennifer Jo Cobb	Jennifer Jo Cobb Racing	Chevrolet
11	Corey Heim	Tricon Garage	Toyota
13	Jake Garcia	ThorSport Racing	Ford
15	Tanner Gray	Tricon Garage	Toyota
17	Taylor Gray	Tricon Garage	Toyota
18	Tyler Ankrum	McAnally-Hilgemann Racing	Chevrolet
19	Christian Eckes	McAnally-Hilgemann Racing	Chevrolet
22	Mason Maggio	Reaume Brothers Racing	Ford
25	Ty Dillon	Rackley W.A.R.	Chevrolet
32	Bret Holmes	Bret Holmes Racing	Chevrolet
33	Lawless Alan	Reaume Brothers Racing	Ford
38	Layne Riggs (R)	Front Row Motorsports	Ford
41	Bayley Currey	Niece Motorsports	Chevrolet
42	Matt Mills	Niece Motorsports	Chevrolet
43	Daniel Dye	McAnally-Hilgemann Racing	Chevrolet
45	Kaden Honeycutt	Niece Motorsports	Chevrolet
46	Thad Moffitt (R)	Faction46	Chevrolet
52	Stewart Friesen	Halmar Friesen Racing	Toyota
56	Timmy Hill	Hill Motorsports	Toyota
66	Cam Waters	ThorSport Racing	Ford
71	Rajah Caruth	Spire Motorsports	Chevrolet
76	Spencer Boyd	Freedom Racing Enterprises	Chevrolet
77	Chase Purdy	Spire Motorsports	Chevrolet
88	Matt Crafton	ThorSport Racing	Ford
91	Zane Smith (i)	McAnally-Hilgemann Racing	Chevrolet
98	Ty Majeski	ThorSport Racing	Ford
99	Ben Rhodes	ThorSport Racing	Ford
Official entry list

== Practice ==
The first and only practice was held on Saturday, May 4, at 11:05 AM CST, and would last for 20 minutes. Ty Majeski, driving for ThorSport Racing, would set the fastest time in the session, with a lap of 30.895, and a speed of 174.786 mph (281.291 km/h).

Pos.	#	Driver	Team	Make	Time	Speed
1	98	Ty Majeski	ThorSport Racing	Ford	30.895	174.786
2	99	Ben Rhodes	ThorSport Racing	Ford	30.900	174.757
3	15	Tanner Gray	Tricon Garage	Toyota	30.903	174.740
Full practice results

== Qualifying ==
Qualifying was held on Saturday, May 4, at 11:35 AM CST. Since Kansas Speedway is an intermediate speedway, the qualifying system used is a single-car, one-lap system with only one round. Drivers will be on track by themselves and will have one lap to post a qualifying time. Whoever sets the fastest time in that round will win the pole.

Chase Purdy, driving for Spire Motorsports, would score the pole for the race, with a lap of 30.728, and a speed of 175.735 mph (282.818 km/h).

No drivers would fail to qualify.

=== Qualifying results ===
Pos.	#	Driver	Team	Make	Time	Speed
1	77	Chase Purdy	Spire Motorsports	Chevrolet	30.728	175.735
2	98	Ty Majeski	ThorSport Racing	Ford	30.732	175.713
3	25	Ty Dillon	Rackley W.A.R.	Chevrolet	30.830	175.154
4	71	Rajah Caruth	Spire Motorsports	Chevrolet	30.843	175.080
5	7	Connor Mosack	Spire Motorsports	Chevrolet	30.859	174.989
6	43	Daniel Dye	McAnally-Hilgemann Racing	Chevrolet	30.882	174.859
7	13	Jake Garcia	ThorSport Racing	Ford	30.885	174.842
8	52	Stewart Friesen	Halmar Friesen Racing	Toyota	30.890	174.814
9	91	Zane Smith (i)	McAnally-Hilgemann Racing	Chevrolet	30.912	174.689
10	19	Christian Eckes	McAnally-Hilgemann Racing	Chevrolet	30.952	174.464
11	99	Ben Rhodes	ThorSport Racing	Ford	30.954	174.452
12	18	Tyler Ankrum	McAnally-Hilgemann Racing	Chevrolet	30.969	174.368
13	11	Corey Heim	Tricon Garage	Toyota	30.975	174.334
14	88	Matt Crafton	ThorSport Racing	Ford	30.979	174.312
15	42	Matt Mills	Niece Motorsports	Chevrolet	31.044	173.947
16	9	Grant Enfinger	CR7 Motorsports	Chevrolet	31.045	173.941
17	17	Taylor Gray	Tricon Garage	Toyota	31.094	173.667
18	15	Tanner Gray	Tricon Garage	Toyota	31.112	173.566
19	1	Brett Moffitt	Tricon Garage	Toyota	31.139	173.416
20	66	Cam Waters	ThorSport Racing	Ford	31.146	173.377
21	41	Bayley Currey	Niece Motorsports	Chevrolet	31.170	173.244
22	5	Dean Thompson	Tricon Garage	Toyota	31.171	173.238
23	45	Kaden Honeycutt	Niece Motorsports	Chevrolet	31.174	173.221
24	32	Bret Holmes	Bret Holmes Racing	Chevrolet	31.337	172.320
25	38	Layne Riggs (R)	Front Row Motorsports	Ford	31.357	172.210
26	46	Thad Moffitt (R)	Faction46	Chevrolet	31.575	171.021
27	76	Spencer Boyd	Freedom Racing Enterprises	Chevrolet	31.592	170.929
28	33	Lawless Alan	Reaume Brothers Racing	Ford	31.594	170.919
29	22	Mason Maggio	Reaume Brothers Racing	Ford	32.194	167.733
30	10	Jennifer Jo Cobb	Jennifer Jo Cobb Racing	Chevrolet	32.522	166.041
31	2	Nick Sanchez	Rev Racing	Chevrolet	–	–
Qualified by owner's points
32	56	Timmy Hill	Hill Motorsports	Toyota	–	–
33	02	Mason Massey	Young's Motorsports	Chevrolet	–	–
Official qualifying results
Official starting lineup

== Race results ==
Stage 1 Laps: 30

Pos.	#	Driver	Team	Make	Pts
1	11	Corey Heim	Tricon Garage	Toyota	10
2	91	Zane Smith (i)	McAnally-Hilgemann Racing	Chevrolet	0
3	19	Christian Eckes	McAnally-Hilgemann Racing	Chevrolet	8
4	77	Chase Purdy	Spire Motorsports	Chevrolet	7
5	45	Kaden Honeycutt	Niece Motorsports	Chevrolet	6
6	99	Ben Rhodes	ThorSport Racing	Ford	5
7	7	Connor Mosack	Spire Motorsports	Chevrolet	4
8	18	Tyler Ankrum	McAnally-Hilgemann Racing	Chevrolet	3
9	25	Ty Dillon	Rackley W.A.R.	Chevrolet	2
10	43	Daniel Dye	McAnally-Hilgemann Racing	Chevrolet	1

Stage 2 Laps: 30

Pos.	#	Driver	Team	Make	Pts
1	91	Zane Smith (i)	McAnally-Hilgemann Racing	Chevrolet	0
2	11	Corey Heim	Tricon Garage	Toyota	9
3	19	Christian Eckes	McAnally-Hilgemann Racing	Chevrolet	8
4	45	Kaden Honeycutt	Niece Motorsports	Chevrolet	7
5	77	Chase Purdy	Spire Motorsports	Chevrolet	6
6	1	Brett Moffitt	Tricon Garage	Toyota	5
7	2	Nick Sanchez	Rev Racing	Chevrolet	4
8	71	Rajah Caruth	Spire Motorsports	Chevrolet	3
9	7	Connor Mosack	Spire Motorsports	Chevrolet	2
10	99	Ben Rhodes	ThorSport Racing	Ford	1

Stage 3 Laps: 74

Fin	St	#	Driver	Team	Make	Laps	Led	Status	Pts
1	13	11	Corey Heim	Tricon Garage	Toyota	134	79	Running	59
2	9	91	Zane Smith (i)	McAnally-Hilgemann Racing	Chevrolet	134	29	Running	0
3	10	19	Christian Eckes	McAnally-Hilgemann Racing	Chevrolet	134	11	Running	50
4	23	45	Kaden Honeycutt	Niece Motorsports	Chevrolet	134	1	Running	46
5	19	1	Brett Moffitt	Tricon Garage	Toyota	134	0	Running	37
6	31	2	Nick Sanchez	Rev Racing	Chevrolet	134	1	Running	35
7	18	15	Tanner Gray	Tricon Garage	Toyota	134	0	Running	30
8	22	5	Dean Thompson	Tricon Garage	Toyota	134	0	Running	29
9	6	43	Daniel Dye	McAnally-Hilgemann Racing	Chevrolet	134	4	Running	29
10	14	88	Matt Crafton	ThorSport Racing	Ford	134	0	Running	27
11	21	41	Bayley Currey	Niece Motorsports	Chevrolet	134	0	Running	26
12	16	9	Grant Enfinger	CR7 Motorsports	Chevrolet	134	0	Running	25
13	4	71	Rajah Caruth	Spire Motorsports	Chevrolet	134	0	Running	27
14	24	32	Bret Holmes	Bret Holmes Racing	Chevrolet	134	0	Running	23
15	3	25	Ty Dillon	Rackley W.A.R.	Chevrolet	133	0	Running	24
16	11	99	Ben Rhodes	ThorSport Racing	Ford	133	0	Running	27
17	7	13	Jake Garcia	ThorSport Racing	Ford	133	0	Running	20
18	25	38	Layne Riggs (R)	Front Row Motorsports	Ford	133	0	Running	19
19	20	66	Cam Waters	ThorSport Racing	Ford	133	0	Running	18
20	12	18	Tyler Ankrum	McAnally-Hilgemann Racing	Chevrolet	133	0	Running	20
21	33	02	Mason Massey	Young's Motorsports	Chevrolet	133	2	Running	16
22	32	56	Timmy Hill	Hill Motorsports	Toyota	132	0	Running	15
23	15	42	Matt Mills	Niece Motorsports	Chevrolet	132	0	Running	14
24	26	46	Thad Moffitt (R)	Faction46	Chevrolet	132	0	Running	13
25	8	52	Stewart Friesen	Halmar Friesen Racing	Toyota	132	0	Running	12
26	28	33	Lawless Alan	Reaume Brothers Racing	Ford	132	0	Running	11
27	17	17	Taylor Gray	Tricon Garage	Toyota	131	0	Running	10
28	1	77	Chase Purdy	Spire Motorsports	Chevrolet	131	7	Running	22
29	29	22	Mason Maggio	Reaume Brothers Racing	Ford	131	0	Running	8
30	5	7	Connor Mosack	Spire Motorsports	Chevrolet	131	0	Running	13
31	27	76	Spencer Boyd	Freedom Racing Enterprises	Chevrolet	129	0	Running	6
32	30	10	Jennifer Jo Cobb	Jennifer Jo Cobb Racing	Chevrolet	128	0	Running	5
33	2	98	Ty Majeski	ThorSport Racing	Ford	10	0	DVP	4
Official race results

== Standings after the race ==
Drivers' Championship standings

	Pos	Driver	Points
1	1	Corey Heim	344
1	2	Christian Eckes	337 (-7)
1	3	Nick Sanchez	295 (–49)
1	4	Ty Majeski	279 (–65)
1	5	Tyler Ankrum	264 (–80)
1	6	Rajah Caruth	260 (–84)
2	7	Taylor Gray	259 (–85)
	8	Matt Crafton	222 (–122)
	9	Tanner Gray	201 (–143)
	10	Grant Enfinger	192 (–152)
Official driver's standings

Manufacturers' Championship standings

Pos	Manufacturer	Points
1	Chevrolet	308
2	Toyota	279 (–29)
3	Ford	250 (–58)

- Note: Only the first 10 positions are included for the driver standings.

Previous race: 2024 SpeedyCash.com 250	NASCAR Craftsman Truck Series; 2024 season	Next race: 2024 Buckle Up South Carolina 200
