= Johnny Gray (drag racing) =

American drag racing driver (born 1953)

- Born: 1953 (age 72–73) Artesia, New Mexico, U.S.
- Retired: 2013
- Relatives: Shane Gray (son); Tanner Gray (grandson); Taylor Gray (grandson)

Funny Car
- Wins: 7

Previous series
- Competition Eliminator, Pro Stock

Johnny Gray (born 1953) is an American retired NHRA drag racer and oil company executive. Since 2021, he has been a partner in Tricon Garage, an American professional stock car racing team that competes in the NASCAR Craftsman Truck Series, for which his grandson Tanner competes and fellow grandson Taylor formerly competed for.

== Racing career ==
=== Drag racing ===
The elder Gray has been racing in various forms of motorsports for nearly half a century; he began drag racing in the early 1990s, climbing the ladder from the National Hot Rod Association's Competition Eliminator division to Pro Stock and later, the Funny Car category with Don Schumacher Racing. Gray retired in 2013 to support the Pro Stock efforts of his son, Shane, and grandson, Tanner. Tanner went on to win the NHRA Pro Stock title in 2018 before moving on to stock car racing.

=== NASCAR ===
In January 2021, Gray partnered with David Gilliland Racing (DGR) to compete in the NASCAR Camping World Truck Series, ARCA Menards Series and the CARS Late Model Stock Tour with factory support from Ford Performance.

== Personal life ==
Johnny Gray was the son of John R. and Bobby Dawn (née Till) Gray. His father was a self-made oil industry titan in New Mexico and north Texas regions.

Johnny Gray was president of Marbob Energy, the New Mexico oil producer co-founded by his father. Gray and his sister sold the company in 2010 for $1.7 billion in proceeds.
