= 2023 Fr8 208 =

3rd race of the 2023 NASCAR Craftsman Truck Series

Race details
- Race 3 of 23 of the 2023 NASCAR Craftsman Truck Series
- Date: March 18, 2023
- Official name: 15th Annual Fr8 208
- Location: Atlanta Motor Speedway, Hampton, Georgia
- Course: Permanent racing facility
- Course length: 1.54 miles (2.48 km)
- Distance: 137 laps, 210 mi (337 km)
- Scheduled distance: 135 laps, 207 mi (334 km)
- Average speed: 92.344 mph (148.613 km/h)

Pole position
Driver	Zane Smith	Front Row Motorsports
- Grid positions set by competition-based formula

Most laps led
Driver	John Hunter Nemechek	Tricon Garage
- Laps: 53

Winner
No. 19	Christian Eckes	McAnally–Hilgemann Racing

Television in the United States
- Network: FS1
- Announcers: Jamie Little, Phil Parsons, and Michael Waltrip

Radio in the United States
- Radio: MRN

The 2023 Fr8 208 was the 3rd stock car race of the 2023 NASCAR Craftsman Truck Series, and the 15th iteration of the event. The race was held on Saturday, March 18, 2023, in Hampton, Georgia, at Atlanta Motor Speedway, a 1.54 miles (2.48 km) permanent tri-oval shaped superspeedway. The race was increased from 135 laps to 137 laps, due to a NASCAR overtime finish. Christian Eckes, driving for McAnally–Hilgemann Racing, would take the win after making a pass on Nick Sanchez for the lead on the final lap. This was Eckes' second career NASCAR Craftsman Truck Series win, and his first of the season. This was also the first win for McAnally–Hilgemann Racing in the truck series. To fill out the podium, Sanchez, driving for Rev Racing, and John Hunter Nemechek, driving for Tricon Garage, would finish 2nd and 3rd, respectively.

== Background ==
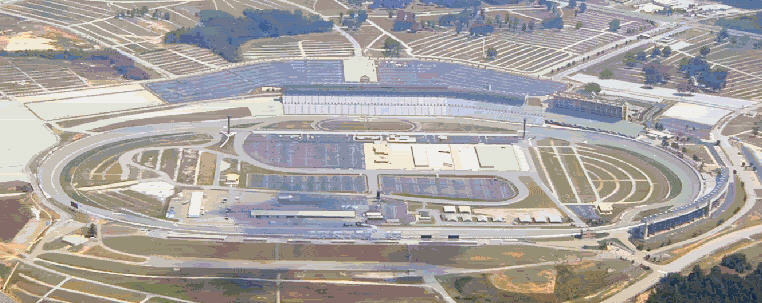
Atlanta Motor Speedway, the circuit where the race will be held.

Atlanta Motor Speedway is a 1.54-mile race track in Hampton, Georgia, United States, 20 miles (32 km) south of Atlanta. It has annually hosted NASCAR Truck Series races since 2004.

The venue was bought by Speedway Motorsports in 1990. In 1994, 46 condominiums were built over the northeastern side of the track. In 1997, to standardize the track with Speedway Motorsports' other two intermediate ovals, the entire track was almost completely rebuilt. The frontstretch and backstretch were swapped, and the configuration of the track was changed from oval to quad-oval, with a new official length of 1.54-mile (2.48 km) where before it was 1.522-mile (2.449 km). The project made the track one of the fastest on the NASCAR circuit. In July 2021 NASCAR announced that the track would be reprofiled for the 2022 season to have 28 degrees of banking and would be narrowed from 55 to 40 feet which the track claims will turn racing at the track similar to restrictor plate superspeedways. Despite the reprofiling being criticized by drivers, construction began in August 2021 and wrapped up in December 2021. The track has seating capacity of 71,000 to 125,000 people depending on the tracks configuration.

=== Entry list ===
- (R) denotes rookie driver.
- (i) denotes driver who is ineligible for series driver points.

#	Driver	Team	Make
1	Layne Riggs	Tricon Garage	Toyota
02	Kris Wright	Young's Motorsports	Chevrolet
2	Nick Sanchez (R)	Rev Racing	Chevrolet
04	Kaden Honeycutt	Roper Racing	Ford
4	Chase Purdy	Kyle Busch Motorsports	Chevrolet
5	Dean Thompson	Tricon Garage	Toyota
9	Colby Howard	CR7 Motorsports	Chevrolet
11	Corey Heim	Tricon Garage	Toyota
12	Spencer Boyd	Young's Motorsports	Chevrolet
13	Hailie Deegan	ThorSport Racing	Ford
15	Tanner Gray	Tricon Garage	Toyota
16	Tyler Ankrum	Hattori Racing Enterprises	Toyota
17	John Hunter Nemechek (i)	Tricon Garage	Toyota
19	Christian Eckes	McAnally–Hilgemann Racing	Chevrolet
20	Mason Maggio	Young's Motorsports	Chevrolet
22	Josh Reaume	AM Racing	Ford
23	Grant Enfinger	GMS Racing	Chevrolet
24	Rajah Caruth (R)	GMS Racing	Chevrolet
25	Matt DiBenedetto	Rackley W.A.R.	Chevrolet
30	Ryan Vargas	On Point Motorsports	Toyota
32	Bret Holmes (R)	Bret Holmes Racing	Chevrolet
33	Mason Massey	Reaume Brothers Racing	Ford
34	Keith McGee (i)	Reaume Brothers Racing	Ford
35	Jake Garcia (R)	McAnally–Hilgemann Racing	Chevrolet
38	Zane Smith	Front Row Motorsports	Ford
41	Bayley Currey (i)	Niece Motorsports	Chevrolet
42	Carson Hocevar	Niece Motorsports	Chevrolet
43	Daniel Dye (R)	GMS Racing	Chevrolet
45	Lawless Alan	Niece Motorsports	Chevrolet
46	Akinori Ogata	G2G Racing	Toyota
51	Jack Wood	Kyle Busch Motorsports	Chevrolet
52	Stewart Friesen	Halmar Friesen Racing	Toyota
56	Timmy Hill	Hill Motorsports	Toyota
88	Matt Crafton	ThorSport Racing	Ford
98	Ty Majeski	ThorSport Racing	Ford
99	Ben Rhodes	ThorSport Racing	Ford
Official entry list

== Starting lineup ==
Qualifying was scheduled to be held on Friday, March 17, at 3:00 PM EST, but was cancelled due to constant rain showers. The starting lineup was determined by a performance-based metric system. As a result, Zane Smith, driving for Front Row Motorsports, earned the pole.

Pos.	#	Driver	Team	Make
1	38	Zane Smith	Front Row Motorsports	Ford
2	98	Ty Majeski	ThorSport Racing	Ford
3	99	Ben Rhodes	ThorSport Racing	Ford
4	19	Christian Eckes	McAnally–Hilgemann Racing	Chevrolet
5	42	Carson Hocevar	Niece Motorsports	Chevrolet
6	11	Corey Heim	Tricon Garage	Toyota
7	23	Grant Enfinger	GMS Racing	Chevrolet
8	88	Matt Crafton	ThorSport Racing	Ford
9	4	Chase Purdy	Kyle Busch Motorsports	Chevrolet
10	25	Matt DiBenedetto	Rackley W.A.R.	Chevrolet
11	15	Tanner Gray	Tricon Garage	Toyota
12	35	Jake Garcia (R)	McAnally–Hilgemann Racing	Chevrolet
13	16	Tyler Ankrum	Hattori Racing Enterprises	Toyota
14	52	Stewart Friesen	Halmar Friesen Racing	Toyota
15	9	Colby Howard	CR7 Motorsports	Chevrolet
16	5	Dean Thompson	Tricon Garage	Toyota
17	51	Jack Wood	Kyle Busch Motorsports	Chevrolet
18	56	Timmy Hill	Hill Motorsports	Toyota
19	43	Daniel Dye (R)	GMS Racing	Chevrolet
20	2	Nick Sanchez (R)	Rev Racing	Chevrolet
21	45	Lawless Alan	Niece Motorsports	Chevrolet
22	24	Rajah Caruth (R)	GMS Racing	Chevrolet
23	1	Layne Riggs	Tricon Garage	Toyota
24	17	John Hunter Nemechek (i)	Tricon Garage	Toyota
25	02	Kris Wright	Young's Motorsports	Chevrolet
26	33	Mason Massey	Reaume Brothers Racing	Ford
27	12	Spencer Boyd	Young's Motorsports	Chevrolet
28	22	Josh Reaume	AM Racing	Ford
29	04	Kaden Honeycutt	Roper Racing	Ford
30	41	Bayley Currey (i)	Niece Motorsports	Chevrolet
31	20	Mason Maggio	Young's Motorsports	Chevrolet
Qualified by owner's points
32	13	Hailie Deegan	ThorSport Racing	Ford
33	32	Bret Holmes (R)	Bret Holmes Racing	Chevrolet
34	46	Akinori Ogata	G2G Racing	Toyota
35	30	Ryan Vargas	On Point Motorsports	Toyota
36	34	Keith McGee (i)	Reaume Brothers Racing	Ford
Official starting lineup

== Race results ==
Stage 1 Laps: 45

Pos.	#	Driver	Team	Make	Pts
1	19	Christian Eckes	McAnally–Hilgemann Racing	Chevrolet	10
2	38	Zane Smith	Front Row Motorsports	Ford	9
3	23	Grant Enfinger	GMS Racing	Chevrolet	8
4	88	Matt Crafton	ThorSport Racing	Ford	7
5	25	Matt DiBenedetto	Rackley W.A.R.	Chevrolet	6
6	98	Ty Majeski	ThorSport Racing	Ford	5
7	52	Stewart Friesen	Halmar Friesen Racing	Toyota	4
8	99	Ben Rhodes	ThorSport Racing	Ford	3
9	4	Chase Purdy	Kyle Busch Motorsports	Chevrolet	2
10	35	Jake Garcia (R)	McAnally–Hilgemann Racing	Chevrolet	1

Stage 2 Laps: 45

Pos.	#	Driver	Team	Make	Pts
1	88	Matt Crafton	ThorSport Racing	Ford	10
2	98	Ty Majeski	ThorSport Racing	Ford	9
3	17	John Hunter Nemechek (i)	Tricon Garage	Toyota	0
4	99	Ben Rhodes	ThorSport Racing	Ford	7
5	11	Corey Heim	Tricon Garage	Toyota	6
6	38	Zane Smith	Front Row Motorsports	Ford	5
7	16	Tyler Ankrum	Hattori Racing Enterprises	Toyota	4
8	23	Grant Enfinger	GMS Racing	Chevrolet	3
9	52	Stewart Friesen	Halmar Friesen Racing	Toyota	2
10	2	Nick Sanchez (R)	Rev Racing	Chevrolet	1

Stage 3 Laps: 47

Fin	St	#	Driver	Team	Make	Laps	Led	Status	Pts
1	4	19	Christian Eckes	McAnally–Hilgemann Racing	Chevrolet	137	35	Running	50
2	20	2	Nick Sanchez (R)	Rev Racing	Chevrolet	137	11	Running	36
3	24	17	John Hunter Nemechek (i)	Tricon Garage	Toyota	137	53	Running	0
4	30	41	Bayley Currey (i)	Niece Motorsports	Chevrolet	137	0	Running	0
5	3	99	Ben Rhodes	ThorSport Racing	Ford	137	3	Running	42
6	10	25	Matt DiBenedetto	Rackley W.A.R.	Chevrolet	137	0	Running	37
7	9	4	Chase Purdy	Kyle Busch Motorsports	Chevrolet	137	0	Running	32
8	18	56	Timmy Hill	Hill Motorsports	Toyota	137	2	Running	29
9	8	88	Matt Crafton	ThorSport Racing	Ford	137	29	Running	45
10	17	51	Jack Wood	Kyle Busch Motorsports	Chevrolet	137	2	Running	27
11	2	98	Ty Majeski	ThorSport Racing	Ford	137	0	Running	40
12	32	13	Hailie Deegan	ThorSport Racing	Ford	137	0	Running	25
13	33	32	Bret Holmes (R)	Bret Holmes Racing	Chevrolet	137	0	Running	24
14	35	30	Ryan Vargas	On Point Motorsports	Toyota	137	0	Running	23
15	25	02	Kris Wright	Young's Motorsports	Chevrolet	137	1	Running	22
16	19	43	Daniel Dye (R)	GMS Racing	Chevrolet	137	0	Running	21
17	34	46	Akinori Ogata	G2G Racing	Toyota	137	0	Running	20
18	12	35	Jake Garcia (R)	McAnally–Hilgemann Racing	Chevrolet	137	0	Running	20
19	7	23	Grant Enfinger	GMS Racing	Chevrolet	137	0	Running	29
20	1	38	Zane Smith	Front Row Motorsports	Ford	137	0	Running	31
21	27	12	Spencer Boyd	Young's Motorsports	Chevrolet	137	0	Running	16
22	14	52	Stewart Friesen	Halmar Friesen Racing	Toyota	137	0	Running	21
23	28	22	Josh Reaume	AM Racing	Ford	137	0	Running	14
24	11	15	Tanner Gray	Tricon Garage	Toyota	137	0	Running	13
25	22	24	Rajah Caruth (R)	GMS Racing	Chevrolet	137	0	Running	12
26	13	16	Tyler Ankrum	Hattori Racing Enterprises	Toyota	136	0	Running	15
27	15	9	Colby Howard	CR7 Motorsports	Chevrolet	134	0	Track Bar	10
28	23	1	Layne Riggs	Tricon Garage	Toyota	134	0	Running	9
29	26	33	Mason Massey	Reaume Brothers Racing	Ford	134	0	Running	8
30	16	5	Dean Thompson	Tricon Garage	Toyota	131	0	Running	7
31	5	42	Carson Hocevar	Niece Motorsports	Chevrolet	127	0	Accident	6
32	21	45	Lawless Alan	Niece Motorsports	Chevrolet	126	0	Accident	5
33	29	04	Kaden Honeycutt	Roper Racing	Ford	123	1	Running	4
34	6	11	Corey Heim	Tricon Garage	Toyota	83	0	Accident	9
35	31	20	Mason Maggio	Young's Motorsports	Chevrolet	52	0	Accident	2
36	36	34	Keith McGee (i)	Reaume Brothers Racing	Ford	7	0	Transmission	0
Official race results

== Standings after the race ==
Drivers' Championship standings

	Pos	Driver	Points
2	1	Christian Eckes	131
2	2	Matt Crafton	126 (-5)
1	3	Ty Majeski	123 (-8)
1	4	Ben Rhodes	119 (-12)
4	5	Zane Smith	116 (-15)
	6	Grant Enfinger	106 (-25)
1	7	Matt DiBenedetto	103 (-28)
2	8	Chase Purdy	97 (-34)
2	9	Carson Hocevar	79 (-52)
1	10	Tanner Gray	78 (-53)
Official driver's standings

- Note: Only the first 10 positions are included for the driver standings.

Previous race: 2023 Victoria's Voice Foundation 200	NASCAR Craftsman Truck Series; 2023 season	Next race: 2023 XPEL 225
