= 2023 Victoria's Voice Foundation 200 =

2nd race of the 2023 NASCAR Craftsman Truck Series

Race details
- Race 2 of 23 of the 2023 NASCAR Craftsman Truck Series
- Date: March 3, 2023
- Official name: 6th Annual Victoria's Voice Foundation 200
- Location: Las Vegas Motor Speedway, North Las Vegas, Nevada
- Course: Permanent racing facility
- Course length: 1.5 miles (2.4 km)
- Distance: 134 laps, 201 mi (323 km)
- Average speed: 118.293 mph (190.374 km/h)

Pole position
| Driver | Kyle Busch | Kyle Busch Motorsports |
- Time: 30.222

Most laps led
| Driver | Kyle Busch | Kyle Busch Motorsports |
- Laps: 84

Winner
| No. 51 | Kyle Busch | Kyle Busch Motorsports |

Television in the United States
- Network: FS1
- Announcers: Jamie Little, Phil Parsons, and Michael Waltrip

Radio in the United States
- Radio: MRN

The 2023 Victoria's Voice Foundation 200 was the 2nd stock car race of the 2023 NASCAR Craftsman Truck Series, and the 6th iteration of the event. The race was held on Friday, March 3, 2023, in North Las Vegas, Nevada at Las Vegas Motor Speedway, a 1.5-mile (2.4 km) permanent tri-oval shaped racetrack. The race was contested over 134 laps. Kyle Busch, driving for his own team, Kyle Busch Motorsports, would put on a dominating performance, leading 84 laps for his 63rd NASCAR Craftsman Truck Series win, and his first of the season. To fill out the podium, Zane Smith, driving for Front Row Motorsports, and Ben Rhodes, driving for ThorSport Racing, would finish 2nd and 3rd, respectively.

== Background ==
Las Vegas Motor Speedway, located in Clark County, Nevada outside the Las Vegas city limits and about 15 miles northeast of the Las Vegas Strip, is a 1,200-acre (490 ha) complex of multiple tracks for motorsports racing. The complex is owned by Speedway Motorsports, Inc., which is headquartered in Charlotte, North Carolina.

=== Entry list ===
- (R) denotes rookie driver.
- (i) denotes driver who is ineligible for series driver points.

| # | Driver | Team | Make |
|---|---|---|---|
| 1 | Kaz Grala (i) | Tricon Garage | Toyota |
| 02 | Kris Wright | Young's Motorsports | Chevrolet |
| 2 | Nick Sanchez (R) | Rev Racing | Chevrolet |
| 04 | Kaden Honeycutt | Roper Racing | Ford |
| 4 | Chase Purdy | Kyle Busch Motorsports | Chevrolet |
| 5 | Dean Thompson | Tricon Garage | Toyota |
| 9 | Colby Howard | CR7 Motorsports | Chevrolet |
| 11 | Corey Heim | Tricon Garage | Toyota |
| 12 | Spencer Boyd | Young's Motorsports | Chevrolet |
| 13 | Hailie Deegan | ThorSport Racing | Ford |
| 15 | Tanner Gray | Tricon Garage | Toyota |
| 16 | Tyler Ankrum | Hattori Racing Enterprises | Toyota |
| 17 | John Hunter Nemechek (i) | Tricon Garage | Toyota |
| 19 | Christian Eckes | McAnally–Hilgemann Racing | Chevrolet |
| 20 | Matt Mills (i) | Young's Motorsports | Chevrolet |
| 22 | Max Gutiérrez | AM Racing | Ford |
| 23 | Grant Enfinger | GMS Racing | Chevrolet |
| 24 | Rajah Caruth (R) | GMS Racing | Chevrolet |
| 25 | Matt DiBenedetto | Rackley W.A.R. | Chevrolet |
| 32 | Bret Holmes (R) | Bret Holmes Racing | Chevrolet |
| 33 | Mason Massey | Reaume Brothers Racing | Ford |
| 34 | Josh Reaume | Reaume Brothers Racing | Ford |
| 35 | Jake Garcia (R) | McAnally–Hilgemann Racing | Chevrolet |
| 38 | Zane Smith | Front Row Motorsports | Ford |
| 41 | Ross Chastain (i) | Niece Motorsports | Chevrolet |
| 42 | Carson Hocevar | Niece Motorsports | Chevrolet |
| 43 | Daniel Dye (R) | GMS Racing | Chevrolet |
| 45 | Lawless Alan | Niece Motorsports | Chevrolet |
| 46 | Brennan Poole (i) | G2G Racing | Toyota |
| 51 | Kyle Busch (i) | Kyle Busch Motorsports | Chevrolet |
| 52 | Stewart Friesen | Halmar Friesen Racing | Toyota |
| 56 | Timmy Hill | Hill Motorsports | Toyota |
| 88 | Matt Crafton | ThorSport Racing | Ford |
| 98 | Ty Majeski | ThorSport Racing | Ford |
| 99 | Ben Rhodes | ThorSport Racing | Ford |
Official entry list

== Practice ==
The first and only practice session was held on Friday, March 3, at 1:30 PM PST, and last for 20 minutes. Ty Majeski, driving for ThorSport Racing, would set the fastest time in the session, with a lap of 30.149, and an average speed of 179.110 mph (288.250 km/h).

| Pos. | # | Driver | Team | Make | Time | Speed |
|---|---|---|---|---|---|---|
| 1 | 98 | Ty Majeski | ThorSport Racing | Ford | 30.149 | 179.110 |
| 2 | 88 | Matt Crafton | ThorSport Racing | Ford | 30.311 | 178.153 |
| 3 | 24 | Rajah Caruth (R) | GMS Racing | Chevrolet | 30.315 | 178.130 |
Full practice results

== Qualifying ==
Qualifying was held on Friday, March 3, at 2:00 PM PST. Since Las Vegas Motor Speedway is an intermediate racetrack, the qualifying system used is a single-car, single-lap system with only one round. In that round, whoever sets the fastest time will win the pole. Kyle Busch, driving for his team, Kyle Busch Motorsports, would score the pole for the race, with a lap of 30.222, and an average speed of 178.678 mph (287.554 km/h).

| Pos. | # | Driver | Team | Make | Time | Speed |
|---|---|---|---|---|---|---|
| 1 | 51 | Kyle Busch (i) | Kyle Busch Motorsports | Toyota | 30.222 | 178.678 |
| 2 | 2 | Nick Sanchez (R) | Rev Racing | Chevrolet | 30.404 | 177.608 |
| 3 | 4 | Chase Purdy | Kyle Busch Motorsports | Chevrolet | 30.404 | 177.608 |
| 4 | 98 | Ty Majeski | ThorSport Racing | Ford | 30.524 | 176.910 |
| 5 | 13 | Hailie Deegan | ThorSport Racing | Ford | 30.567 | 176.661 |
| 6 | 32 | Bret Holmes (R) | Bret Holmes Racing | Chevrolet | 30.648 | 176.194 |
| 7 | 38 | Zane Smith | Front Row Motorsports | Ford | 30.709 | 175.844 |
| 8 | 42 | Carson Hocevar | Niece Motorsports | Chevrolet | 30.710 | 175.838 |
| 9 | 99 | Ben Rhodes | ThorSport Racing | Ford | 30.743 | 175.650 |
| 10 | 1 | Kaz Grala (i) | Tricon Garage | Toyota | 30.785 | 175.410 |
| 11 | 88 | Matt Crafton | ThorSport Racing | Ford | 30.814 | 175.245 |
| 12 | 19 | Christian Eckes | McAnally–Hilgemann Racing | Chevrolet | 30.829 | 175.160 |
| 13 | 17 | John Hunter Nemechek (i) | Tricon Garage | Toyota | 30.856 | 175.006 |
| 14 | 35 | Jake Garcia (R) | McAnally–Hilgemann Racing | Chevrolet | 30.869 | 174.933 |
| 15 | 11 | Corey Heim | Tricon Garage | Toyota | 30.875 | 174.899 |
| 16 | 15 | Tanner Gray | Tricon Garage | Toyota | 30.879 | 174.876 |
| 17 | 23 | Grant Enfinger | GMS Racing | Chevrolet | 30.893 | 174.797 |
| 18 | 16 | Tyler Ankrum | Hattori Racing Enterprises | Toyota | 30.912 | 174.689 |
| 19 | 25 | Matt DiBenedetto | Rackley W.A.R. | Chevrolet | 30.937 | 174.548 |
| 20 | 43 | Daniel Dye (R) | GMS Racing | Chevrolet | 30.953 | 174.458 |
| 21 | 45 | Lawless Alan | Niece Motorsports | Chevrolet | 30.964 | 174.396 |
| 22 | 52 | Stewart Friesen | Halmar Friesen Racing | Toyota | 30.972 | 174.351 |
| 23 | 41 | Ross Chastain (i) | Niece Motorsports | Chevrolet | 30.983 | 174.289 |
| 24 | 24 | Rajah Caruth (R) | GMS Racing | Chevrolet | 30.984 | 174.284 |
| 25 | 5 | Dean Thompson | Tricon Garage | Toyota | 31.008 | 174.149 |
| 26 | 56 | Timmy Hill | Hill Motorsports | Toyota | 31.055 | 173.885 |
| 27 | 9 | Colby Howard | CR7 Motorsports | Chevrolet | 31.108 | 173.589 |
| 28 | 02 | Kris Wright | Young's Motorsports | Chevrolet | 31.110 | 173.578 |
| 29 | 04 | Kaden Honeycutt | Roper Racing | Ford | 31.331 | 172.353 |
| 30 | 22 | Max Gutiérrez | AM Racing | Ford | 31.447 | 171.717 |
| 31 | 12 | Spencer Boyd | Young's Motorsports | Chevrolet | 31.614 | 170.810 |
Qualified by owner's points
| 32 | 33 | Mason Massey | Reaume Brothers Racing | Ford | 31.700 | 170.347 |
| 33 | 34 | Josh Reaume | Reaume Brothers Racing | Ford | 32.227 | 167.561 |
| 34 | 46 | Brennan Poole (i) | G2G Racing | Toyota | – | – |
| 35 | 20 | Matt Mills | Young's Motorsports | Chevrolet | – | – |
Official qualifying results
Official starting lineup

== Race results ==
Stage 1 Laps: 30

| Pos. | # | Driver | Team | Make | Pts |
|---|---|---|---|---|---|
| 1 | 38 | Zane Smith | Front Row Motorsports | Ford | 10 |
| 2 | 98 | Ty Majeski | ThorSport Racing | Ford | 9 |
| 3 | 25 | Matt DiBenedetto | Rackley W.A.R. | Chevrolet | 8 |
| 4 | 23 | Grant Enfinger | GMS Racing | Chevrolet | 7 |
| 5 | 24 | Rajah Caruth (R) | GMS Racing | Chevrolet | 6 |
| 6 | 88 | Matt Crafton | ThorSport Racing | Ford | 5 |
| 7 | 99 | Ben Rhodes | ThorSport Racing | Ford | 4 |
| 8 | 42 | Carson Hocevar | Niece Motorsports | Chevrolet | 3 |
| 9 | 41 | Ross Chastain (i) | Niece Motorsports | Chevrolet | 0 |
| 10 | 15 | Tanner Gray | Tricon Garage | Toyota | 1 |

Stage 2 Laps: 30

| Pos. | # | Driver | Team | Make | Pts |
|---|---|---|---|---|---|
| 1 | 42 | Carson Hocevar | Niece Motorsports | Chevrolet | 10 |
| 2 | 99 | Ben Rhodes | ThorSport Racing | Ford | 9 |
| 3 | 25 | Matt DiBenedetto | Rackley W.A.R. | Chevrolet | 8 |
| 4 | 4 | Chase Purdy | Kyle Busch Motorsports | Chevrolet | 7 |
| 5 | 23 | Grant Enfinger | GMS Racing | Chevrolet | 6 |
| 6 | 88 | Matt Crafton | ThorSport Racing | Ford | 5 |
| 7 | 24 | Rajah Caruth (R) | GMS Racing | Chevrolet | 4 |
| 8 | 1 | Kaz Grala (i) | Tricon Garage | Toyota | 0 |
| 9 | 15 | Tanner Gray | Tricon Garage | Toyota | 2 |
| 10 | 98 | Ty Majeski | ThorSport Racing | Ford | 1 |

Stage 3 Laps: 74

| Fin | St | # | Driver | Team | Make | Laps | Led | Status | Pts |
|---|---|---|---|---|---|---|---|---|---|
| 1 | 1 | 51 | Kyle Busch (i) | Kyle Busch Motorsports | Chevrolet | 134 | 84 | Running | 0 |
| 2 | 7 | 38 | Zane Smith | Front Row Motorsports | Ford | 134 | 8 | Running | 45 |
| 3 | 9 | 99 | Ben Rhodes | ThorSport Racing | Ford | 134 | 2 | Running | 47 |
| 4 | 15 | 11 | Corey Heim | Tricon Garage | Toyota | 134 | 0 | Running | 33 |
| 5 | 4 | 98 | Ty Majeski | ThorSport Racing | Ford | 134 | 0 | Running | 42 |
| 6 | 12 | 19 | Christian Eckes | McAnally–Hilgemann Racing | Chevrolet | 134 | 0 | Running | 31 |
| 7 | 8 | 42 | Carson Hocevar | Niece Motorsports | Chevrolet | 134 | 19 | Running | 43 |
| 8 | 3 | 4 | Chase Purdy | Kyle Busch Motorsports | Chevrolet | 134 | 0 | Running | 36 |
| 9 | 17 | 23 | Grant Enfinger | GMS Racing | Chevrolet | 134 | 3 | Running | 41 |
| 10 | 14 | 35 | Jake Garcia (R) | McAnally–Hilgemann Racing | Chevrolet | 134 | 0 | Running | 27 |
| 11 | 11 | 88 | Matt Crafton | ThorSport Racing | Ford | 134 | 0 | Running | 36 |
| 12 | 19 | 25 | Matt DiBenedetto | Rackley W.A.R. | Chevrolet | 133 | 0 | Running | 41 |
| 13 | 16 | 15 | Tanner Gray | Tricon Garage | Toyota | 133 | 0 | Running | 27 |
| 14 | 22 | 52 | Stewart Friesen | Halmar Friesen Racing | Toyota | 133 | 0 | Running | 23 |
| 15 | 18 | 16 | Tyler Ankrum | Hattori Racing Enterprises | Toyota | 133 | 0 | Running | 22 |
| 16 | 25 | 5 | Dean Thompson | Tricon Garage | Toyota | 133 | 0 | Running | 21 |
| 17 | 10 | 1 | Kaz Grala (i) | Tricon Garage | Toyota | 133 | 5 | Running | 0 |
| 18 | 27 | 9 | Colby Howard | CR7 Motorsports | Chevrolet | 133 | 0 | Running | 19 |
| 19 | 20 | 43 | Daniel Dye (R) | GMS Racing | Chevrolet | 132 | 5 | Running | 18 |
| 20 | 21 | 45 | Lawless Alan | Niece Motorsports | Chevrolet | 132 | 0 | Running | 17 |
| 21 | 30 | 22 | Max Gutiérrez | AM Racing | Ford | 131 | 0 | Running | 16 |
| 22 | 26 | 56 | Timmy Hill | Hill Motorsports | Toyota | 131 | 0 | Running | 15 |
| 23 | 31 | 12 | Spencer Boyd | Young's Motorsports | Chevrolet | 130 | 0 | Running | 14 |
| 24 | 23 | 41 | Ross Chastain (i) | Niece Motorsports | Chevrolet | 130 | 0 | Running | 0 |
| 25 | 29 | 04 | Kaden Honeycutt | Roper Racing | Ford | 130 | 0 | Running | 12 |
| 26 | 35 | 20 | Matt Mills | Young's Motorsports | Chevrolet | 129 | 0 | Running | 11 |
| 27 | 32 | 33 | Mason Massey | Reaume Brothers Racing | Ford | 129 | 0 | Running | 10 |
| 28 | 28 | 02 | Kris Wright | Young's Motorsports | Chevrolet | 126 | 0 | Running | 9 |
| 29 | 24 | 24 | Rajah Caruth (R) | GMS Racing | Chevrolet | 122 | 0 | Running | 18 |
| 30 | 2 | 2 | Nick Sanchez (R) | Rev Racing | Chevrolet | 103 | 8 | Accident | 7 |
| 31 | 13 | 17 | John Hunter Nemechek (i) | Tricon Garage | Toyota | 98 | 0 | Vibration | 0 |
| 32 | 5 | 13 | Hailie Deegan | ThorSport Racing | Ford | 59 | 0 | Accident | 5 |
| 33 | 34 | 46 | Brennan Poole (i) | G2G Racing | Toyota | 20 | 0 | Rear Gear | 0 |
| 34 | 6 | 32 | Bret Holmes (R) | Bret Holmes Racing | Chevrolet | 16 | 0 | Accident | 3 |
| 35 | 33 | 34 | Josh Reaume | Reaume Brothers Racing | Ford | 4 | 0 | Transmission | 2 |
Official race results

== Standings after the race ==
Drivers' Championship standings

| | Pos | Driver | Points |
|---|---|---|---|
| 3 | 1 | Zane Smith | 85 |
| 1 | 2 | Ty Majeski | 83 (-2) |
| 3 | 3 | Christian Eckes | 81 (-4) |
| 2 | 4 | Matt Crafton | 81 (-4) |
| 4 | 5 | Ben Rhodes | 77 (-8) |
| 1 | 6 | Grant Enfinger | 77 (-8) |
| 3 | 7 | Carson Hocevar | 73 (-12) |
| 5 | 8 | Matt DiBenedetto | 66 (-19) |
| 3 | 9 | Tanner Gray | 65 (-20) |
| 2 | 10 | Chase Purdy | 65 (-20) |
Official driver's standings

- Note: Only the first 10 positions are included for the driver standings.

| Previous race: 2023 NextEra Energy 250 | NASCAR Craftsman Truck Series; 2023 season | Next race: 2023 Fr8 208 |
