= 2025 Black's Tire 200 =

7th race of the 2025 NASCAR Craftsman Truck Series

Race details
- Race 7 of 25 of the 2025 NASCAR Craftsman Truck Series
- Date: April 18, 2025
- Location: Rockingham Speedway in Rockingham, North Carolina
- Course: Permanent racing facility
- Course length: 0.94 miles (1.51 km)
- Distance: 200 laps, 188 mi (302 km)
- Scheduled distance: 200 laps, 188 mi (302 km)
- Average speed: 102.904 mph (165.608 km/h)

Pole position
Driver	Jake Garcia	ThorSport Racing
- Time: 22.050

Most laps led
Driver	Corey Heim	Tricon Garage
- Laps: 52

Winner
No. 18	Tyler Ankrum	McAnally-Hilgemann Racing

Television in the United States
- Network: FS1
- Announcers: Jamie Little, Carson Hocevar, and Michael Waltrip

Radio in the United States
- Radio: NRN

The 2025 Black's Tire 200 was the 7th stock car race of the 2025 NASCAR Craftsman Truck Series, and the third iteration of the event. The race was held on Friday, April 18, 2025, at Rockingham Speedway in Rockingham, North Carolina, a 0.94 miles (1.51 km) permanent asphalt oval shaped short track. The race took the scheduled 200 laps to complete.

Tyler Ankrum, driving for McAnally-Hilgemann Racing, would execute a successful pit road strategy, leading the final 29 laps to earn his second career NASCAR Craftsman Truck Series win, and his first of the season, snapping a winless drought dating back to the 2019 Buckle Up in Your Truck 225. Corey Heim led a race-high 52 laps, finishing 8th, while Layne Riggs won both stages and finished 11th, due to running low on fuel in the final few laps. To fill out the podium, Jake Garcia, driving for ThorSport Racing, and Daniel Hemric, driving for McAnally-Hilgemann Racing, would finish 2nd and 3rd, respectively.

This was also the first Truck Series race to be held at Rockingham since 2013, and the third and final race of the Triple Truck Challenge. Ankrum won the race and was granted the $50K bonus cash.

== Report ==
=== Entry list ===
- (R) denotes rookie driver.
- (i) denotes driver who is ineligible for series driver points.

#	Driver	Team	Make
1	Brandon Jones (i)	Tricon Garage	Toyota
02	Nathan Byrd	Young's Motorsports	Chevrolet
2	Stephen Mallozzi	Reaume Brothers Racing	Ford
5	Toni Breidinger (R)	Tricon Garage	Toyota
6	Norm Benning	Norm Benning Racing	Chevrolet
07	Sammy Smith (i)	Spire Motorsports	Chevrolet
7	Corey Day (i)	Spire Motorsports	Chevrolet
9	Grant Enfinger	CR7 Motorsports	Chevrolet
11	Corey Heim	Tricon Garage	Toyota
13	Jake Garcia	ThorSport Racing	Ford
15	Tanner Gray	Tricon Garage	Toyota
17	Gio Ruggiero (R)	Tricon Garage	Toyota
18	Tyler Ankrum	McAnally-Hilgemann Racing	Chevrolet
19	Daniel Hemric	McAnally-Hilgemann Racing	Chevrolet
22	Cody Dennison	Reaume Brothers Racing	Ford
26	Dawson Sutton (R)	Rackley W.A.R.	Chevrolet
33	Frankie Muniz (R)	Reaume Brothers Racing	Ford
34	Layne Riggs	Front Row Motorsports	Ford
38	Chandler Smith	Front Row Motorsports	Ford
42	Matt Mills	Niece Motorsports	Chevrolet
44	Bayley Currey	Niece Motorsports	Chevrolet
45	Kaden Honeycutt	Niece Motorsports	Chevrolet
52	Stewart Friesen	Halmar Friesen Racing	Toyota
56	Timmy Hill	Hill Motorsports	Toyota
66	Luke Fenhaus (R)	ThorSport Racing	Ford
71	Rajah Caruth	Spire Motorsports	Chevrolet
75	Parker Kligerman	Henderson Motorsports	Chevrolet
76	Spencer Boyd	Freedom Racing Enterprises	Chevrolet
77	Andrés Pérez de Lara (R)	Spire Motorsports	Chevrolet
81	Connor Mosack (R)	McAnally-Hilgemann Racing	Chevrolet
88	Matt Crafton	ThorSport Racing	Ford
90	Justin Carroll	TC Motorsports	Toyota
91	Jack Wood	McAnally-Hilgemann Racing	Chevrolet
98	Ty Majeski	ThorSport Racing	Ford
99	Ben Rhodes	ThorSport Racing	Ford
Official entry list

== Practice ==
The first and only practice session was held on Friday, April 18, at 12:30 PM EST, and would last for 50 minutes. Ty Majeski, driving for ThorSport Racing, would set the fastest time in the session, with a lap of 22.763, and a speed of 148.662 mph (239.248 km/h).

Pos.	#	Driver	Team	Make	Time	Speed
1	98	Ty Majeski	ThorSport Racing	Ford	22.763	148.662
2	34	Layne Riggs	Front Row Motorsports	Ford	22.853	148.077
3	13	Jake Garcia	ThorSport Racing	Ford	22.866	147.993
Full practice results

== Qualifying ==
Qualifying was held on Friday, April 18, at 1:30 PM EST. Since Rockingham Speedway is an oval track, the qualifying system used is a single-car, one-lap system with one round. Drivers will be on track by themselves and will have one lap to post a qualifying time, and whoever sets the fastest time in that round will win the pole.

Jake Garcia, driving for ThorSport Racing, would score the pole for the race, with a lap of 22.050, and a speed of 153.469 mph (246.984 km/h).

No drivers would fail to qualify.

=== Qualifying results ===
Pos.	#	Driver	Team	Make	Time	Speed
1	13	Jake Garcia	ThorSport Racing	Ford	22.050	153.469
2	38	Chandler Smith	Front Row Motorsports	Ford	22.155	152.742
3	99	Ben Rhodes	ThorSport Racing	Ford	22.161	152.701
4	81	Connor Mosack (R)	McAnally-Hilgemann Racing	Chevrolet	22.194	152.474
5	34	Layne Riggs	Front Row Motorsports	Ford	22.196	152.460
6	44	Bayley Currey	Niece Motorsports	Chevrolet	22.208	152.378
7	45	Kaden Honeycutt	Niece Motorsports	Chevrolet	22.211	152.357
8	17	Gio Ruggiero (R)	Tricon Garage	Toyota	22.212	152.350
9	98	Ty Majeski	ThorSport Racing	Ford	22.242	152.145
10	15	Tanner Gray	Tricon Garage	Toyota	22.246	152.117
11	07	Sammy Smith (i)	Spire Motorsports	Chevrolet	22.357	151.362
12	66	Luke Fenhaus (R)	ThorSport Racing	Ford	22.370	151.274
13	42	Matt Mills	Niece Motorsports	Chevrolet	22.376	151.233
14	77	Andrés Pérez de Lara (R)	Spire Motorsports	Chevrolet	22.388	151.152
15	11	Corey Heim	Tricon Garage	Toyota	22.438	150.816
16	18	Tyler Ankrum	McAnally-Hilgemann Racing	Chevrolet	22.495	150.433
17	19	Daniel Hemric	McAnally-Hilgemann Racing	Chevrolet	22.499	150.407
18	7	Corey Day (i)	Spire Motorsports	Chevrolet	22.500	150.400
19	9	Grant Enfinger	CR7 Motorsports	Chevrolet	22.581	149.861
20	52	Stewart Friesen	Halmar Friesen Racing	Toyota	22.620	149.602
21	71	Rajah Caruth	Spire Motorsports	Chevrolet	22.676	149.233
22	75	Parker Kligerman	Henderson Motorsports	Chevrolet	22.735	148.845
23	88	Matt Crafton	ThorSport Racing	Ford	22.737	148.832
24	91	Jack Wood	McAnally-Hilgemann Racing	Chevrolet	22.767	148.636
25	26	Dawson Sutton (R)	Rackley W.A.R.	Chevrolet	22.936	147.541
26	56	Timmy Hill	Hill Motorsports	Toyota	22.992	147.182
27	5	Toni Breidinger (R)	Tricon Garage	Toyota	23.001	147.124
28	02	Nathan Byrd	Young's Motorsports	Chevrolet	23.101	146.487
29	1	Brandon Jones (i)	Tricon Garage	Toyota	23.233	145.655
30	33	Frankie Muniz (R)	Reaume Brothers Racing	Ford	23.317	145.130
31	76	Spencer Boyd	Freedom Racing Enterprises	Chevrolet	23.333	145.031
Qualified by owner's points
32	90	Justin Carroll	TC Motorsports	Toyota	23.909	141.537
33	2	Stephen Mallozzi	Reaume Brothers Racing	Ford	25.310	133.702
34	6	Norm Benning	Norm Benning Racing	Chevrolet	25.487	132.774
35	22	Cody Dennison	Reaume Brothers Racing	Ford	–	–
Official qualifying results
Official starting lineup

== Race results ==
Stage 1 Laps: 45

Pos.	#	Driver	Team	Make	Pts
1	34	Layne Riggs	Front Row Motorsports	Ford	10
2	13	Jake Garcia	ThorSport Racing	Ford	9
3	45	Kaden Honeycutt	Niece Motorsports	Chevrolet	8
4	38	Chandler Smith	Front Row Motorsports	Ford	7
5	11	Corey Heim	Tricon Garage	Toyota	6
6	17	Gio Ruggiero (R)	Tricon Garage	Toyota	5
7	98	Ty Majeski	ThorSport Racing	Ford	4
8	15	Tanner Gray	Tricon Garage	Toyota	3
9	07	Sammy Smith (i)	Spire Motorsports	Chevrolet	0
10	66	Luke Fenhaus (R)	ThorSport Racing	Ford	1

Stage 2 Laps: 45

Pos.	#	Driver	Team	Make	Pts
1	34	Layne Riggs	Front Row Motorsports	Ford	10
2	45	Kaden Honeycutt	Niece Motorsports	Chevrolet	9
3	13	Jake Garcia	ThorSport Racing	Ford	8
4	38	Chandler Smith	Front Row Motorsports	Ford	7
5	11	Corey Heim	Tricon Garage	Toyota	6
6	98	Ty Majeski	ThorSport Racing	Ford	5
7	9	Grant Enfinger	CR7 Motorsports	Chevrolet	4
8	17	Gio Ruggiero (R)	Tricon Garage	Toyota	3
9	75	Parker Kligerman	Henderson Motorsports	Chevrolet	2
10	15	Tanner Gray	Tricon Garage	Toyota	1

Stage 3 Laps: 110

Fin	St	#	Driver	Team	Make	Laps	Led	Status	Pts
1	16	18	Tyler Ankrum	McAnally-Hilgemann Racing	Chevrolet	200	29	Running	40
2	1	13	Jake Garcia	ThorSport Racing	Ford	200	43	Running	52
3	17	19	Daniel Hemric	McAnally-Hilgemann Racing	Chevrolet	200	1	Running	34
4	21	71	Rajah Caruth	Spire Motorsports	Chevrolet	200	0	Running	33
5	19	9	Grant Enfinger	CR7 Motorsports	Chevrolet	200	15	Running	36
6	7	45	Kaden Honeycutt	Niece Motorsports	Chevrolet	200	12	Running	48
7	24	91	Jack Wood	McAnally-Hilgemann Racing	Chevrolet	200	0	Running	30
8	15	11	Corey Heim	Tricon Garage	Toyota	199	52	Running	42
9	4	81	Connor Mosack (R)	McAnally-Hilgemann Racing	Chevrolet	199	0	Running	28
10	8	17	Gio Ruggiero (R)	Tricon Garage	Toyota	199	1	Running	35
11	5	34	Layne Riggs	Front Row Motorsports	Ford	199	24	Running	46
12	14	77	Andrés Pérez de Lara (R)	Spire Motorsports	Chevrolet	199	0	Running	25
13	2	38	Chandler Smith	Front Row Motorsports	Ford	199	23	Running	38
14	28	02	Nathan Byrd	Young's Motorsports	Chevrolet	198	0	Running	23
15	31	76	Spencer Boyd	Freedom Racing Enterprises	Chevrolet	198	0	Running	22
16	11	07	Sammy Smith (i)	Spire Motorsports	Chevrolet	197	0	Running	0
17	29	1	Brandon Jones (i)	Tricon Garage	Toyota	196	0	Running	0
18	27	5	Toni Breidinger (R)	Tricon Garage	Toyota	196	0	Running	19
19	25	26	Dawson Sutton (R)	Rackley W.A.R.	Chevrolet	196	0	Running	18
20	6	44	Bayley Currey	Niece Motorsports	Chevrolet	195	0	Running	17
21	26	56	Timmy Hill	Hill Motorsports	Toyota	195	0	Running	16
22	18	7	Corey Day (i)	Spire Motorsports	Chevrolet	194	0	Running	0
23	30	33	Frankie Muniz (R)	Reaume Brothers Racing	Ford	176	0	Running	14
24	23	88	Matt Crafton	ThorSport Racing	Ford	156	0	Running	13
25	22	75	Parker Kligerman	Henderson Motorsports	Chevrolet	147	0	Suspension	14
26	12	66	Luke Fenhaus (R)	ThorSport Racing	Ford	136	0	Engine	12
27	35	22	Cody Dennison	Reaume Brothers Racing	Ford	131	0	Running	10
28	10	15	Tanner Gray	Tricon Garage	Toyota	117	0	Accident	13
29	20	52	Stewart Friesen	Halmar Friesen Racing	Toyota	117	0	Accident	8
30	13	42	Matt Mills	Niece Motorsports	Chevrolet	117	0	Accident	7
31	9	98	Ty Majeski	ThorSport Racing	Ford	109	0	Accident	15
32	3	99	Ben Rhodes	ThorSport Racing	Ford	71	0	Steering	5
33	33	2	Stephen Mallozzi	Reaume Brothers Racing	Ford	41	0	Suspension	4
34	32	90	Justin Carroll	TC Motorsports	Toyota	34	0	Too Slow	3
35	34	6	Norm Benning	Norm Benning Racing	Chevrolet	17	0	Too Slow	2
Official race results

== Standings after the race ==
Drivers' Championship standings

	Pos	Driver	Points
	1	Corey Heim	312
	2	Chandler Smith	290 (-22)
1	3	Tyler Ankrum	250 (–62)
1	4	Daniel Hemric	239 (–73)
1	5	Layne Riggs	232 (–80)
3	6	Ty Majeski	228 (–84)
3	7	Jake Garcia	224 (–88)
1	8	Grant Enfinger	218 (–94)
2	9	Kaden Honeycutt	215 (–97)
2	10	Stewart Friesen	185 (–127)
Official driver's standings

Manufacturers' Championship standings

Pos	Manufacturer	Points
1	Chevrolet	263
2	Toyota	243 (-20)
3	Ford	243 (–20)

- Note: Only the first 10 positions are included for the driver standings.

Previous race: 2025 Weather Guard Truck Race	NASCAR Craftsman Truck Series; 2025 season	Next race: 2025 SpeedyCash.com 250
