= Tanner Gray =

American racing driver (born 1999)

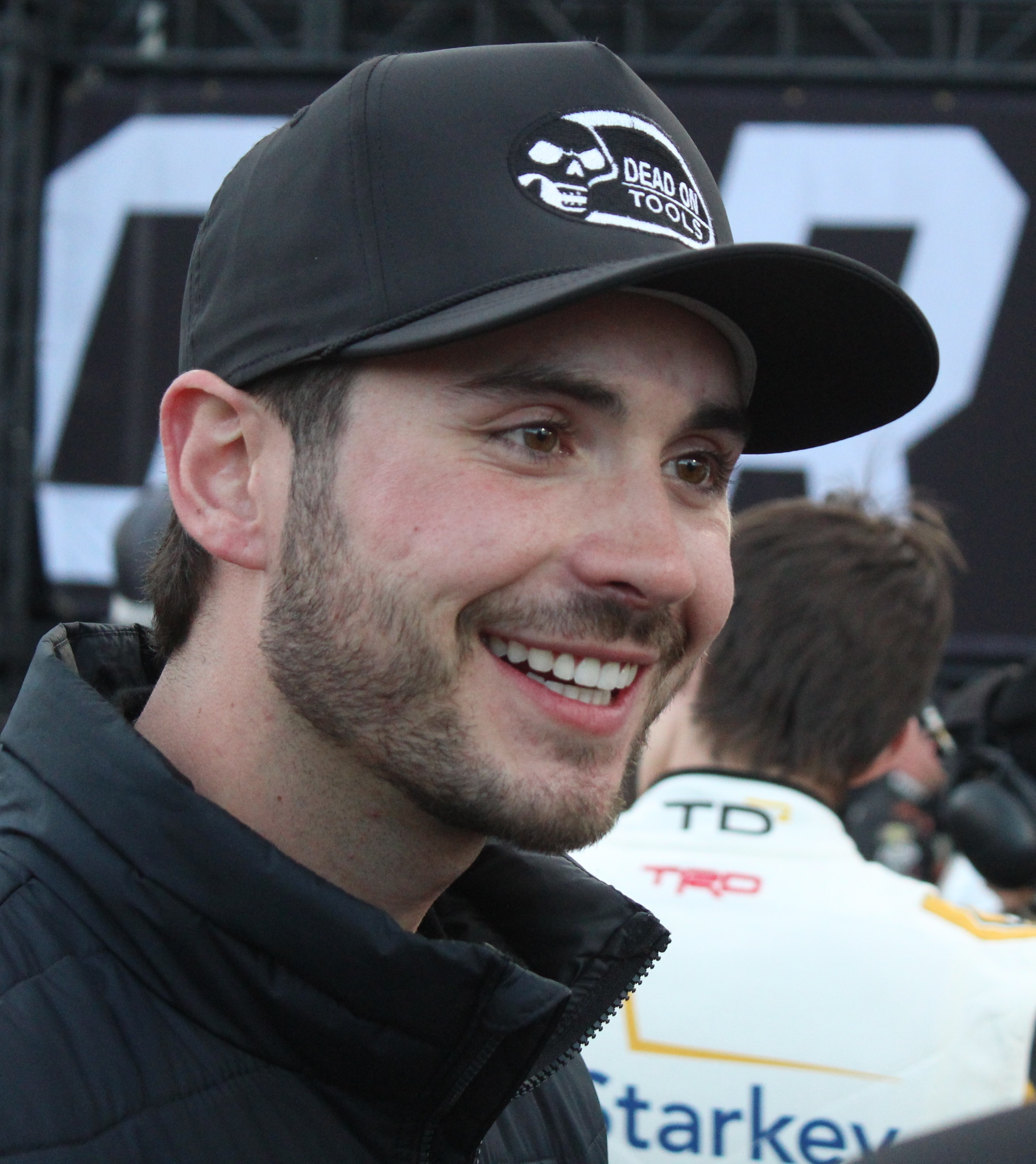
- Gray at Martinsville Speedway in 2024
- Born: Tanner Sean Gray; April 15, 1999 (age 27); Artesia, New Mexico, U.S.
- Achievements: 2018 NHRA Pro Stock champion
- Awards: 2017 NHRA Mello Yello Drag Racing Series Rookie of the Year

NASCAR FedEx Freight Truck Series career
- 167 races run over 8 years
- 2026 position: 14th
- Best finish: 13th (2024, 2025)
- First race: 2019 NASCAR Hall of Fame 200 (Martinsville)
- Last race: 2026 Craftsman 200 (Homestead)
Wins	Top tens	Poles
0	36	2

ARCA Menards Series career
- 21 races run over 4 years
- Best finish: 19th (2019, 2020)
- First race: 2019 Pensacola 200 (Pensacola)
- Last race: 2024 Reese's 150 (Kansas)
- First win: 2024 General Tire 150 (Charlotte)
- Last win: 2024 Reese's 150 (Kansas)
Wins	Top tens	Poles
2	14	2

ARCA Menards Series East career
- 13 races run over 2 years
- Best finish: 3rd (2019)
- First race: 2019 New Smyrna 175 (New Smyrna)
- Last race: 2020 Skip's Western Outfitters 175 (New Smyrna)
- First win: 2019 Who's Your Driver Twin 100s (South Boston)
Wins	Top tens	Poles
1	9	1

ARCA Menards Series West career
- 5 races run over 1 year
- Best finish: 13th (2019)
- First race: 2019 ENEOS NAPA Auto 150 (Irwindale)
- Last race: 2019 Monaco Cocktails Gateway Classic 125 (Gateway)
Wins	Top tens	Poles
0	4	1
- Statistics up to date as of November 6, 2026.

Tanner Sean Gray (born April 15, 1999) is an American professional stock car racing driver. He last competed full-time in the NASCAR Craftsman Truck Series, driving the No. 15 Toyota Tundra TRD Pro for Tricon Garage. Gray is the youngest professional driver to win a national event in NHRA history, and the youngest driver to win a solo NHRA season championship.

== Racing career ==
=== Drag racing ===
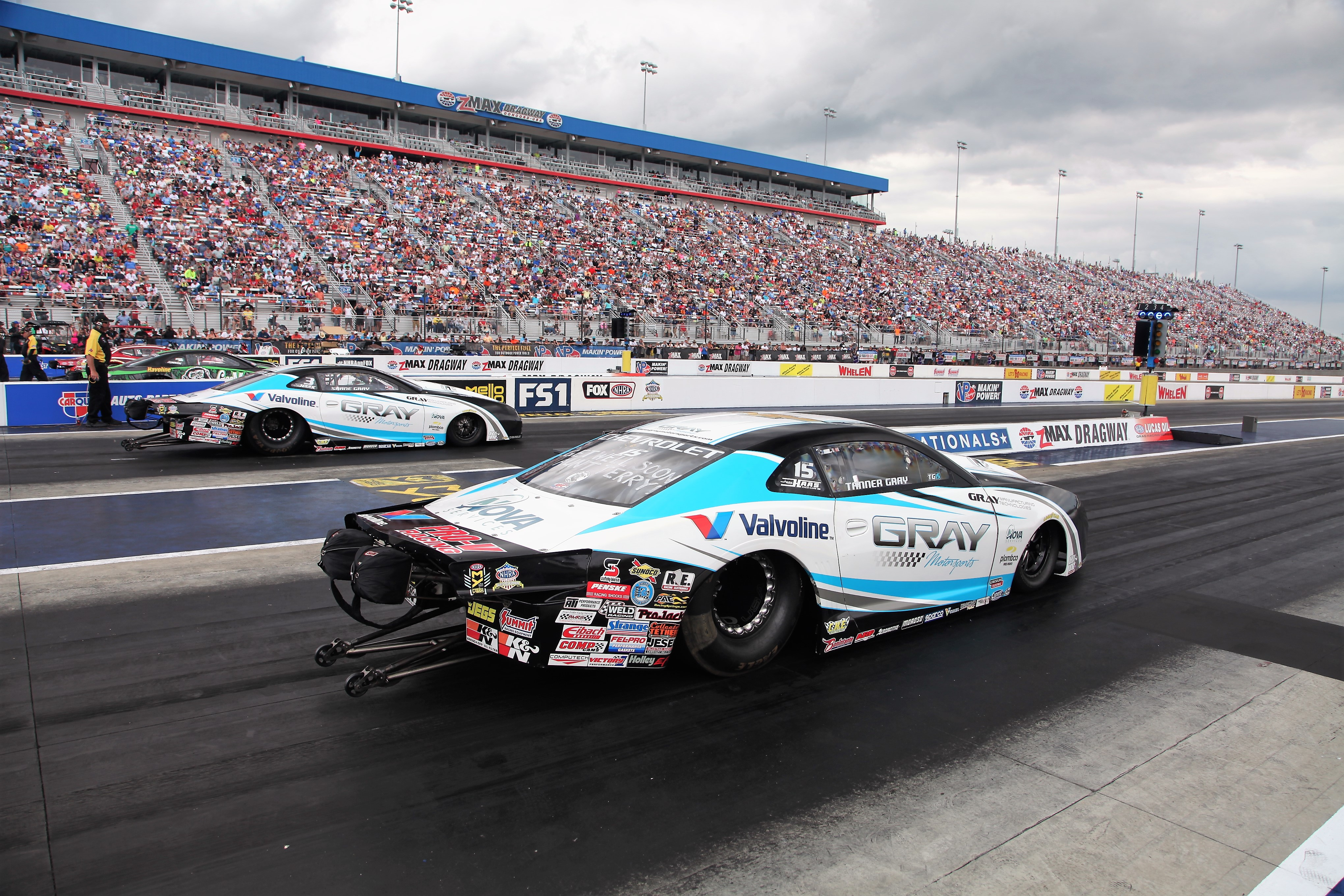
Gray racing against his father Shane in the 2017 NHRA Four-Wide Nationals

2017 marked the first year for Gray racing in the Pro Stock class within the NHRA Mello Yello Drag Racing Series alongside his father, Shane Gray.

Gray made NHRA history thirteen days before his eighteenth birthday at the 18th Annual Denso Spark Plug Nationals at The Strip at Las Vegas Motor Speedway on April 2, 2017, by winning the final round against Bo Butner. He was 17 years, 11 months, and 18 days, which was younger than the 40-year record holder Jeb Allen, who was 18 years, 1 month, and 8 days.

Gray won the 2017 Auto Club Road to the Future Award. The award is given to the top rookie from all of the sport's pro categories, including Pro Stock Motorcycle, Top Fuel and Funny Car.

In 2018, Gray won eight times en route to the Pro Stock title, becoming the youngest ever NHRA season champion.

=== ARCA Series ===
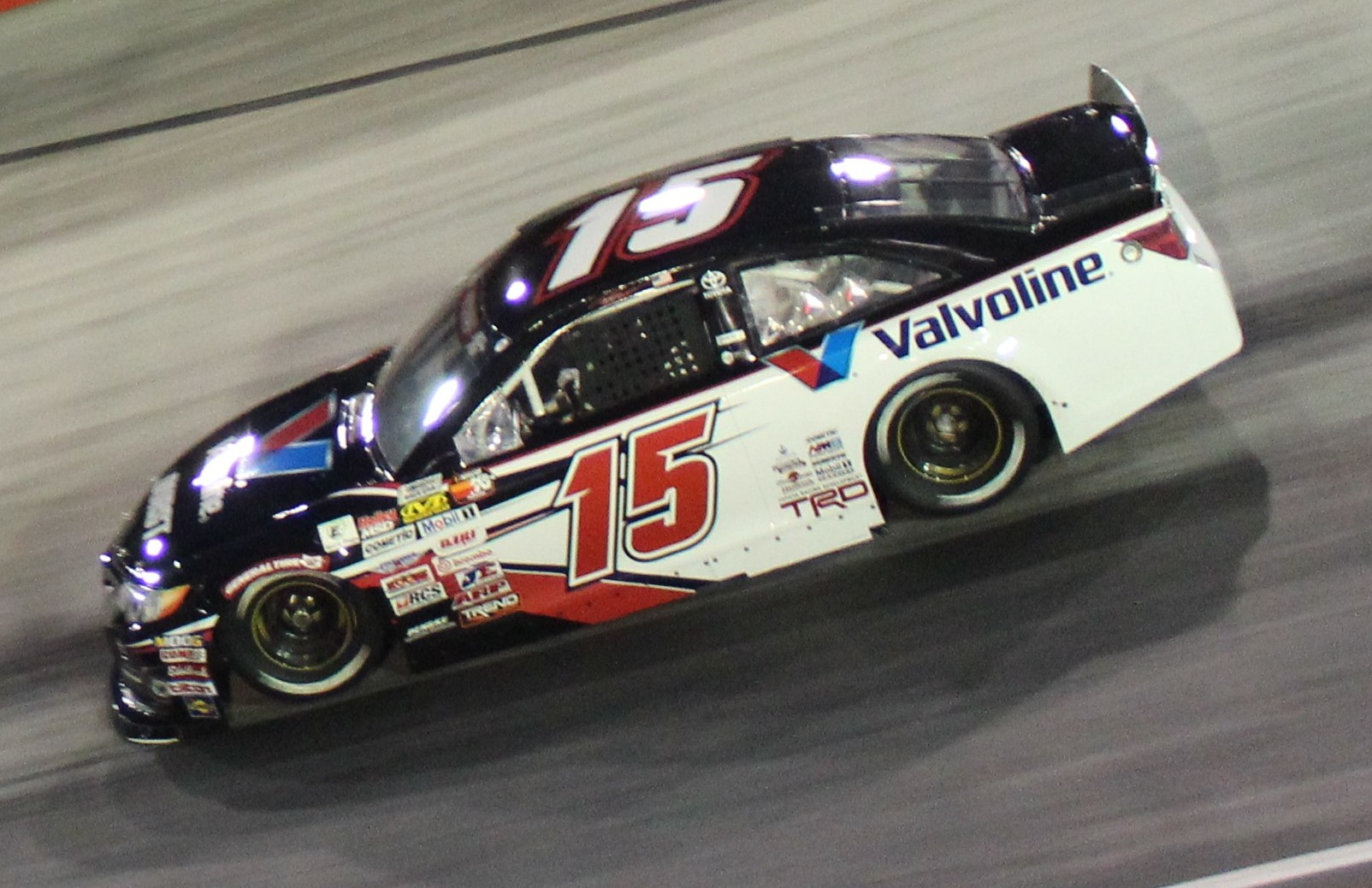
Gray running the 2019 K&N Pro Series East race at Bristol Motor Speedway

==== 2019–2020: DGR-Crosley ====
On September 25, 2018, Gray announced he would race in the NASCAR K&N Pro Series East for DGR-Crosley in 2019. The move came after Gray had met team owner David Gilliland in summer 2018. He picked up his first win at South Boston Speedway in early May.

In December 2019, the team announced that Gray would continue to drive in the East Series, now the ARCA Menards Series East, part-time in 2020, as well as part-time in the big 20-race ARCA Menards Series, where he would share the full-time No. 17 car with his younger brother Taylor (who ran the Sioux Chief Showdown races) and Anthony Alfredo.

==== 2021: David Gilliland Racing ====
Gray returned to the ARCA Menards Series in 2021, running the season-opener at Daytona, finishing 7th.

==== 2024: Joe Gibbs Racing ====
On December 13, 2023, it was announced that Gray would return to the ARCA Menards Series and run six races in 2024, driving the No. 18 car for Joe Gibbs Racing. He will run at the tracks 1.5 miles and longer, since the original driver of the car, William Sawalich, is ineligible to race at those tracks due to his age.

=== NASCAR Craftsman Truck Series ===
==== 2019–2026: Tricon Garage ====
In October 2019, Gray made his NASCAR Gander Outdoors Truck Series debut with DGR-Crosley at Martinsville Speedway in the No. 15 Toyota Tundra; running a three-race schedule, he also competed in the ISM Raceway and Homestead–Miami Speedway events in the No. 7.

On December 16, 2019, DGR-Crosley announced Gray would run full-time and for rookie of the year in the Truck Series in 2020, driving the team's No. 15 truck, now a Ford F-150 after the team switched from Toyota to Ford in the offseason. Gray had a decent rookie season, earning eight top tens and four top fives, finishing fourteenth in the point standings and fifth in Rookie of the Year standings.

Gray returned to the team for 2021, under the new name David Gilliland Racing. He would have an abysmal season, only earning two top tens and finishing 18th in points.

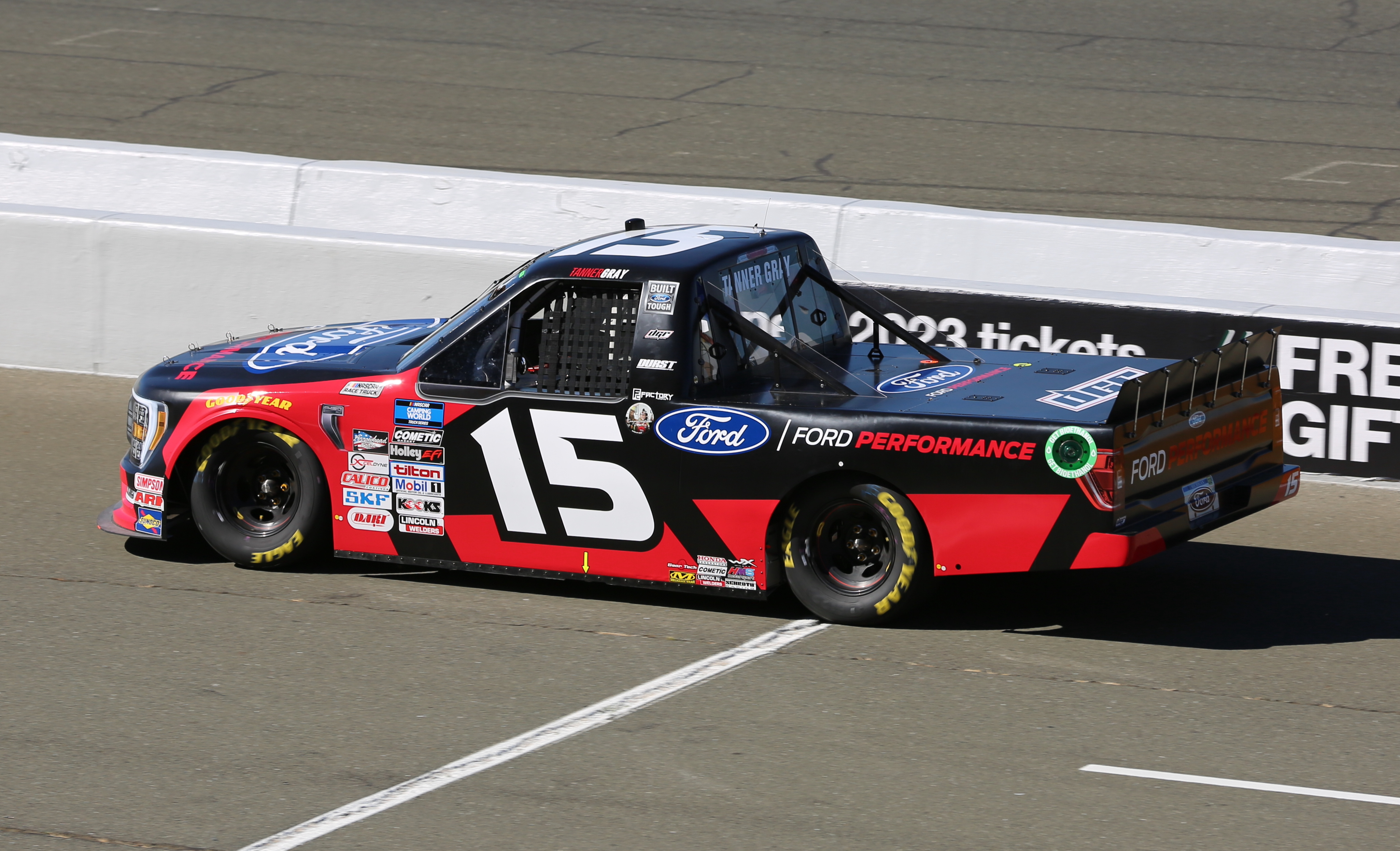
Gray's No. 15 truck at Sonoma in 2022

He improved significantly in 2022, which included three consecutive top-ten finishes in the first three races of the season. He earned six top tens and two top fives throughout the season, improving to a 15th-place points finish.

October 27, 2022, David Gilliland Racing announced that they would be moving to Toyota Racing Development in 2023, and renaming to Tricon Garage (with Tricon styled in all-capital letters). Gray would remain as one of the drivers for the team. He started the 2023 season with a career-best 2nd-place finish at Daytona, only behind race winner Zane Smith. He would also score his first career pole at Charlotte Motor Speedway in May, with a lap of 29.936, and a speed of 180.385 mph (290.302 km/h). He finished the season 14th in points.

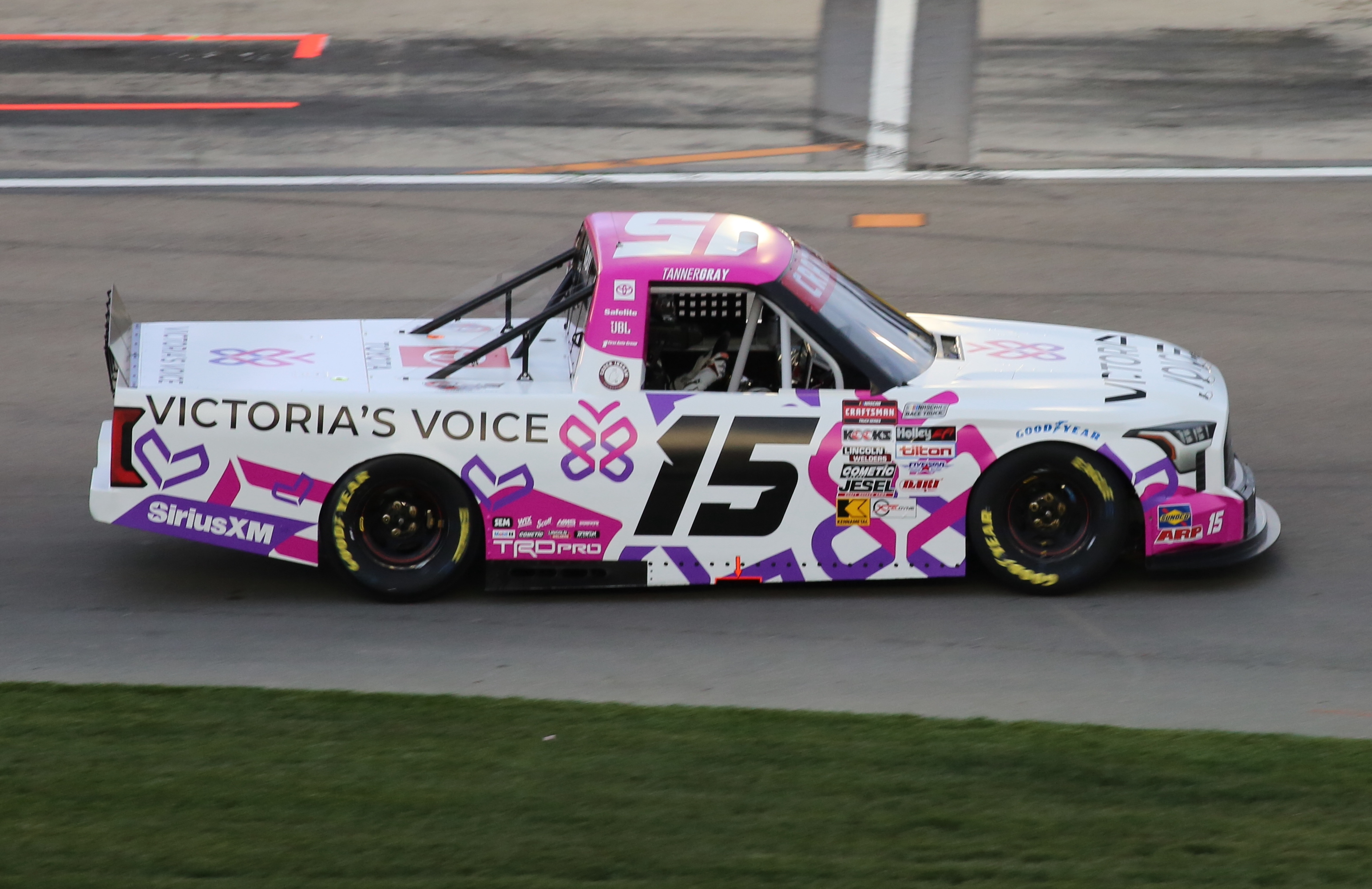
Gray's No. 15 truck at Las Vegas Motor Speedway in 2025

On November 18, 2024, Tricon Garage announced it had renewed Gray's contract for the 2025 season. Gray would struggle across 2025, failing to make the playoffs, finishing 13th in points. Even when the format was switched to the Chase in 2026, Gray only got 3 top 10s and failed to make it in, finishing 14th in points. After seven full seasons, Gray would be released from Tricon after 2026.

=== Other racing ===
Gray has raced in different types of cars, including Late models, modifieds, Midget cars, and stock cars. He has raced on oval dirt tracks in the area of Mooresville, including racing in the Mini Outlaw Karts category alongside Kyle Larson and Rico Abreu on Wednesday nights at Millbridge Speedway in Salisbury.

== Personal life ==
Gray was born on April 15, 1999, to professional drag racer and national event champion Shane Gray and his wife Amber of Artesia, New Mexico. He is the grandson of funny car and pro stock champion Johnny Gray, making Tanner a third-generation Gray to race in the NHRA. In addition to racing, Johnny Gray was the president of Marbob Energy, the New Mexico oil producer co-founded by his father. Johnny and his sister sold the company in 2010 for $1.7 billion in proceeds. Since 2021, Johnny Gray has co-owned Tricon Garage.

The Gray family moved from New Mexico to Mooresville, North Carolina in 2010 so that Shane Gray could pursue a career as a professional drag racer in the NHRA. Tanner's younger brother, Taylor Gray, is also a NASCAR driver for Joe Gibbs Racing and currently competes full-time for them in the NASCAR O'Reilly Auto Parts Series in the No. 54 car.

== Motorsports career results ==
=== Stock car career summary ===
Season	Series	Team	Races	Wins	Top 5	Top 10	Points	Position
2016	CARS Super Late Model Tour	LFR Development Group	1	0	0	0	20	52nd
2019	CARS Late Model Stock Car Tour	DGR-Crosley	1	0	0	0	20	50th
2019	NASCAR K&N Pro Series West	DGR-Crosley	5	0	3	4	195	13th
2019	NASCAR K&N Pro Series East	DGR-Crosley	12	1	6	9	458	**3rd**
2019	ARCA Menards Series	DGR-Crosley	8	0	1	5	1440	19th
2019	NASCAR Gander Outdoors Truck Series	DGR-Crosley	3	0	0	0	59	46th
2020	ARCA Menards Series East	DGR-Crosley	1	0	0	0	26	48th
2020	ARCA Menards Series	DGR-Crosley	6	0	2	3	203	19th
2020	NASCAR Gander Outdoors Truck Series	DGR-Crosley	23	0	4	8	511	14th
2021	ARCA Menards Series	David Gilliland Racing	1	0	0	1	38	76th
2021	NASCAR Camping World Truck Series	David Gilliland Racing	22	0	1	2	323	18th
2022	NASCAR Camping World Truck Series	David Gilliland Racing	23	0	2	6	487	15th
2023	NASCAR Craftsman Truck Series	Tricon Garage	23	0	3	6	533	14th
2024	ARCA Menards Series	Joe Gibbs Racing	6	2	5	5	245	20th
2024	NASCAR Craftsman Truck Series	Tricon Garage	23	0	0	5	550	13th
2025	NASCAR Craftsman Truck Series	Tricon Garage	25	0	3	6	599	13th
2026	NASCAR Craftsman Truck Series	Tricon Garage	25	0	0	3	510	14th

=== NASCAR ===
(key) (Bold – Pole position awarded by qualifying time. Italics – Pole position earned by points standings or practice time. * – Most laps led.)

==== Craftsman Truck Series ====
NASCAR Craftsman Truck Series results
Year	Team	No.	Make	1	2	3	4	5	6	7	8	9	10	11	12	13	14	15	16	17	18	19	20	21	22	23	24	25	NCTC	Pts	Ref
2019	DGR-Crosley	15	Toyota	DAY	ATL	LVS	MAR	TEX	DOV	KAN	CLT	TEX	IOW	GTW	CHI	KEN	POC	ELD	MCH	BRI	MSP	LVS	TAL	MAR; 20					46th	59	
2019	DGR-Crosley	7	Toyota																						PHO; 17	HOM; 16			46th	59	
2020	DGR-Crosley	15	Ford	DAY; 23	LVS; 8	CLT; 20	ATL; 11	HOM; 12	POC; 12	KEN; 9	TEX; 36	KAN; 18	KAN; 4	MCH; 3	DRC; 15	DOV; 17	GTW; 10	DAR; 29	RCH; 16	BRI; 3	LVS; 3	TAL; 29	KAN; 36	TEX; 10	MAR; 31	PHO; 15			14th	511	
2021	David Gilliland Racing	15	Ford	DAY; 35	DRC; 20	LVS; 12	ATL; 19	BRD; 13	RCH; 24	KAN; 18	DAR; 33	COA; 31	CLT; 22	TEX; 9	NSH; 18	POC; 16	KNX; 31	GLN; 14	GTW; 19	DAR; 24	BRI; 38	LVS; 23	TAL; 34	MAR; 3	PHO; 35				18th	323	
2022	David Gilliland Racing	15	Ford	DAY; 4	LVS; 5	ATL; 8	COA; 17	MAR; 21	BRD; 15	DAR; 34	KAN; 18	TEX; 24	CLT; 6	GTW; 30	SON; 13	KNX; 22	NSH; 30	MOH; 20	POC; 10	IRP; 23	RCH; 16	KAN; 16	BRI; 17	TAL; 31	HOM; 25	PHO; 8			15th	487	
2023	Tricon Garage	15	Toyota	DAY; 2	LVS; 13	ATL; 24	COA; 8	TEX; 27	BRD; 8	MAR; 5	KAN; 18	DAR; 3	NWS; 18	**CLT**; 27	GTW; 21	NSH; 11	MOH; 20	POC; 36	RCH; 16	IRP; 15	MLW; 11	KAN; 26	BRI; 29	TAL; 25	HOM; 11	PHO; 9			14th	533	
2024	Tricon Garage	15	Toyota	DAY; 16	ATL; 19	LVS; 20	BRI; 15	COA; 10	MAR; 16	TEX; 8	KAN; 7	DAR; 10	NWS; 16	**CLT**; 17	GTW; 11	NSH; 14	POC; 19	IRP; 20	RCH; 12	MLW; 11	BRI; 23	KAN; 6	TAL; 30	HOM; 20	MAR; 29	PHO; 11			13th	550	
2025	Tricon Garage	15	Toyota	DAY; 22	ATL; 15	LVS; 3	HOM; 17	MAR; 21	BRI; 18	CAR; 28	TEX; 5	KAN; 27	NWS; 11	CLT; 26	NSH; 16	MCH; 17	POC; 2	LRP; 14	IRP; 13	GLN; 28	RCH; 14	DAR; 6	BRI; 6	NHA; 29	ROV; 31	TAL; 12	MAR; 8	PHO; 21	13th	599	
2026	Tricon Garage	15	Toyota	DAY; 23	ATL; 30	STP; 20	DAR; 13	CAR; 16	BRI; 20	TEX; 28	GLN; 30	DOV; 16	CLT; 8	NSH; 33	MCH; 18	COR; 12	LRP; 8	NWS; 18	IRP; 22	RCH; 13	NHA; 21	BRI; 16	KAN; 8	CLT; 19	PHO; 28	TAL; 11	MAR; 18	HOM; 27	14th	510	

^{*} Season still in progress
^{1} Ineligible for series points

=== ARCA Menards Series ===
(key) (Bold – Pole position awarded by qualifying time. Italics – Pole position earned by points standings or practice time. * – Most laps led.)

ARCA Menards Series results
Year	Team	No.	Make	1	2	3	4	5	6	7	8	9	10	11	12	13	14	15	16	17	18	19	20	AMSC	Pts	Ref
2019	DGR-Crosley	54	Toyota	DAY	FIF; 12	SLM; 7	TAL	NSH	TOL; 8	CLT; 6	POC	MCH; 5	MAD	GTW; 17	CHI; 15	ELK	IOW	POC	ISF	DSF	SLM	IRP	**KAN**; 6	19th	1440	
2020	DGR-Crosley	17	Ford	DAY; 16	PHO; 4	TAL; 13	POC; 15	IRP	KEN; 9	IOW	KAN; 5	TOL	TOL	MCH	DRC	GTW	I44	TOL	BRI	WIN	MEM	ISF	KAN	19th	203	
2021	David Gilliland Racing	17	Ford	DAY; 7	PHO	TAL	KAN	TOL	CLT	MOH	POC	ELK	BLN	IOW	WIN	GLN	MCH	ISF	MLW	DSF	BRI	SLM	KAN	76th	38	
2024	Joe Gibbs Racing	18	Toyota	DAY; 24	PHO	TAL; 3	DOV	**KAN**; 2*	CLT; 1	IOW	MOH	BLN	IRP	SLM	ELK	MCH; 3*	ISF	MLW	DSF	GLN	BRI	KAN; 1*	TOL	20th	245	

==== ARCA Menards Series East ====
ARCA Menards Series East results
Year	Team	No.	Make	1	2	3	4	5	6	7	8	9	10	11	12	AMSEC	Pts	Ref
2019	DGR-Crosley	15	Toyota	NSM; 12	BRI; 10	**SBO**; 1*	SBO; 4	MEM; 3	NHA; 5	IOW; 6	GLN; 11	BRI; 6	GTW; 15	NHA; 2	DOV; 2	3rd	458	
2020	DGR-Crosley	17	Ford	NSM; 18	TOL	DOV	TOL	BRI	FIF							48th	26	

==== K&N Pro Series West ====
NASCAR K&N Pro Series West results
Year	Team	No.	Make	1	2	3	4	5	6	7	8	9	10	11	12	13	14	NKNPSWC	Pts	Ref
2019	DGR-Crosley	15	Toyota	LVS	IRW; 2	**TUS**; 2	TUS; 2	CNS	SON	DCS	IOW; 6	EVG	GTW; 15	MER	AAS	KCR	PHO	13th	195	

=== CARS Late Model Stock Car Tour ===
(key) (Bold – Pole position awarded by qualifying time. Italics – Pole position earned by points standings or practice time. * – Most laps led. ** – All laps led.)

CARS Late Model Stock Car Tour results
Year	Team	No.	Make	1	2	3	4	5	6	7	8	9	10	11	CLMSCTC	Pts	Ref
2019	DGR-Crosley	54	Toyota	SNM	HCY; 13	ROU	ACE	MMS	LGY	DOM	CCS	HCY	ROU	SBO	50th	20	

=== CARS Super Late Model Tour ===
(key)

CARS Super Late Model Tour results
Year	Team	No.	Make	1	2	3	4	5	6	7	8	9	10	CSLMTC	Pts	Ref
2016	LFR Development Group	40	Chevy	SNM	ROU; 13	HCY	TCM	GRE	ROU	CON	MYB	HCY	SNM	52nd	20	
