= Mike Christopher =

Mike Christopher may refer to:

- Mike Christopher (baseball) (born 1963), American Major League Baseball pitcher
- Mike Christopher (racing driver) (born 1958), American stock car racing driver
- Mike Christopher Jr. (born 1999), his son, American stock car racing driver
- Mic Christopher (1969–2001), Irish singer-songwriter
