= 2026 TSport 200 =

NASCAR Craftsman Truck Series race at Lucas Oil Indianapolis Raceway Park

2026 TSport 200 presented by Warn Industries
Race details
- Race 16 of 25 in the 2026 NASCAR Craftsman Truck Series
- Date: July 24, 2026
- Location: Lucas Oil Indianapolis Raceway Park in Brownsburg, Indiana
- Course: Permanent racing facility
- Course length: 0.686 miles (1.104 km)
- Distance: 200 laps, 137.2 mi (220.801 km)
- Average speed: 80.601 miles per hour (129.715 km/h)

Pole position
Driver	Layne Riggs	Front Row Motorsports
- Time: 22.805

Most laps led
Driver	Layne Riggs	Front Row Motorsports
- Laps: 198

Fastest lap
Driver	Layne Riggs	Front Row Motorsports
- Time: 23.316

Winner
No. 34	Layne Riggs	Front Row Motorsports

Television in the United States
- Network: FS1
- Announcers: Jamie Little, Michael Waltrip, and Regan Smith

Radio in the United States
- Radio: NRN
- Booth announcers: Kurt Becker and Kyle Rickey
- Turn announcers: Tim Catalfamo (Turns 2−4)

The 2026 TSport 200 presented by Warn Industries was a NASCAR Craftsman Truck Series race held on July 24, 2026, at Lucas Oil Indianapolis Raceway Park in Brownsburg, Indiana. Contested over 200 laps on the 0.686-mile (1.104 km) asphalt oval, it was the 16th race of the 2026 NASCAR Craftsman Truck Series season, and the fifth running of the event.

Layne Riggs, driving for Front Row Motorsports, pulled off a blistering performance, sweeping the stages and leading all but two laps in the event from the pole position to earn his tenth career NASCAR Craftsman Truck Series win, his fifth of the season, and his second consecutive win at the track. Connor Mosack finished second, and Ty Majeski finished third. Chandler Smith and Nick Sanchez rounded out the top five, while Stewart Friesen, Kaden Honeycutt, Gavan Boschele, Tyler Ankrum, and Mike Christopher Jr. rounded out the top ten.

Following the race, Christian Eckes and Gio Ruggiero clinched a spot in The Chase.

== Report ==
=== Background ===
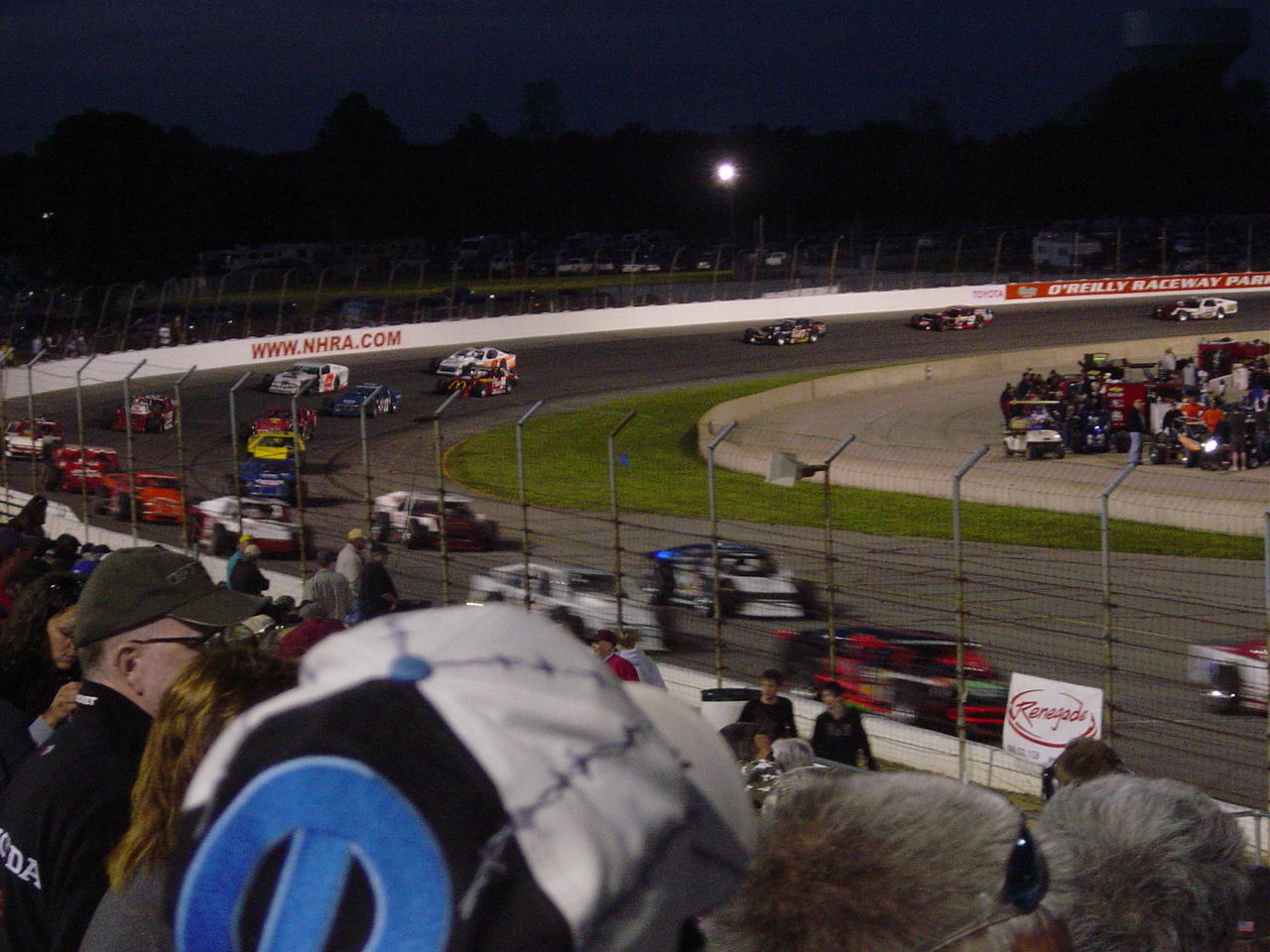
Lucas Oil Indianapolis Raceway Park, the track where the race was held.

Lucas Oil Indianapolis Raceway Park (formerly Indianapolis Raceway Park, O'Reilly Raceway Park at Indianapolis, and Lucas Oil Raceway) is an auto racing facility in Brownsburg, Indiana, about 10 miles (16 km) northwest of downtown Indianapolis. It includes a 0.686-mile (1.104 km) oval track, a 2.5-mile (4.0 km) road course (which has fallen into disrepair and is no longer used), and a 4,400-foot (1,300 m) drag strip which is among the premier drag racing venues in the world. The complex receives about 500,000 visitors annually.

==== Entry list ====
- (R) denotes rookie driver.
- (i) denotes driver who is ineligible for series driver points.

#	Driver	Team	Make
1	Gavan Boschele	Tricon Garage	Toyota
2	Jackson Macenko	Team Reaume	Ford
5	Harrison Burton (i)	Tricon Garage	Toyota
7	Connor Mosack	Spire Motorsports	Chevrolet
9	Grant Enfinger	CR7 Motorsports	Chevrolet
10	Corey LaJoie	Kaulig Racing	Ram
11	Kaden Honeycutt	Tricon Garage	Toyota
12	Brenden Queen (R)	Kaulig Racing	Ram
13	Cole Butcher (R)	ThorSport Racing	Ford
14	Mini Tyrrell (R)	Kaulig Racing	Ram
15	Tanner Gray	Tricon Garage	Toyota
16	Justin Haley	Kaulig Racing	Ram
17	Gio Ruggiero	Tricon Garage	Toyota
18	Tyler Ankrum	McAnally–Hilgemann Racing	Chevrolet
19	Daniel Hemric	McAnally–Hilgemann Racing	Chevrolet
22	Monty Tipton	Team Reaume	Ford
25	Conor Daly	Kaulig Racing	Ram
26	Dawson Sutton	Rackley W.A.R.	Chevrolet
27	Toni Breidinger	Rackley W.A.R.	Chevrolet
33	Frankie Muniz	Team Reaume	Ford
34	Layne Riggs	Front Row Motorsports	Ford
38	Chandler Smith	Front Row Motorsports	Ford
42	Parker Eatmon	Niece Motorsports	Chevrolet
44	Andrés Pérez de Lara	Niece Motorsports	Chevrolet
45	Landen Lewis	Niece Motorsports	Chevrolet
52	Stewart Friesen	Halmar Friesen Racing	Toyota
56	Timmy Hill	Hill Motorsports	Toyota
62	Mike Christopher Jr.	Halmar Friesen Racing	Toyota
69	Jonathan Shafer	MBM Motorsports	Ram
76	Spencer Boyd	Freedom Racing Enterprises	Chevrolet
77	Nick Sanchez (i)	Spire Motorsports	Chevrolet
81	Kris Wright	McAnally–Hilgemann Racing	Chevrolet
88	Ty Majeski	ThorSport Racing	Ford
90	Justin Carroll	TC Motorsports	Toyota
91	Christian Eckes	McAnally–Hilgemann Racing	Chevrolet
93	Cassten Everidge	Costner Motorsports	Chevrolet
98	Jake Garcia	ThorSport Racing	Ford
99	Ben Rhodes	ThorSport Racing	Ford
Official entry list

== Practice ==
The first and only practice session was held on Friday, July 24, at 3:00 PM EST, and lasted for 50 minutes.

Connor Mosack, driving for Spire Motorsports, set the fastest time in the session, with a lap of 23.184 seconds, and a speed of 106.522 miles per hour (171.431 km/h).

Pos.	#	Driver	Team	Make	Time	Speed
1	7	Connor Mosack	Spire Motorsports	Chevrolet	23.184	106.522
2	34	Layne Riggs	Front Row Motorsports	Ford	23.260	106.174
3	77	Nick Sanchez (i)	Spire Motorsports	Chevrolet	23.272	106.119
Full practice results

== Qualifying ==
Qualifying was held on Friday, July 24, at 4:05 PM EST. Since Lucas Oil Indianapolis Raceway Park is a short track, the qualifying procedure used was a single-car, two-lap system with one round. Drivers were on track by themselves and had two laps to post a qualifying time, and whoever set the fastest time won the pole.

Layne Riggs, driving for Front Row Motorsports, qualified on pole position with a lap of 22.805 seconds, and a speed of 108.292 miles per hour (174.279 km/h).

Two drivers failed to qualify: Justin Carroll and Jonathan Shafer.

=== Qualifying results ===
Pos.	#	Driver	Team	Make	Time	Speed
1	34	Layne Riggs	Front Row Motorsports	Ford	22.805	108.292
2	38	Chandler Smith	Front Row Motorsports	Ford	22.855	108.055
3	77	Nick Sanchez (i)	Spire Motorsports	Chevrolet	22.855	108.055
4	91	Christian Eckes	McAnally–Hilgemann Racing	Chevrolet	22.891	107.885
5	52	Stewart Friesen	Halmar Friesen Racing	Toyota	22.969	107.519
6	11	Kaden Honeycutt	Tricon Garage	Toyota	23.000	107.374
7	7	Connor Mosack	Spire Motorsports	Chevrolet	23.003	107.360
8	9	Grant Enfinger	CR7 Motorsports	Chevrolet	23.027	107.248
9	88	Ty Majeski	ThorSport Racing	Ford	23.054	107.122
10	44	Andrés Pérez de Lara	Niece Motorsports	Chevrolet	23.063	107.081
11	62	Mike Christopher Jr.	Halmar Friesen Racing	Toyota	23.067	107.062
12	12	Brenden Queen (R)	Kaulig Racing	Ram	23.099	106.914
13	18	Tyler Ankrum	McAnally–Hilgemann Racing	Chevrolet	23.100	106.909
14	42	Parker Eatmon	Niece Motorsports	Chevrolet	23.111	106.858
15	98	Jake Garcia	ThorSport Racing	Ford	23.146	106.697
16	17	Gio Ruggiero	Tricon Garage	Toyota	23.183	106.526
17	15	Tanner Gray	Tricon Garage	Toyota	23.191	106.490
18	19	Daniel Hemric	McAnally–Hilgemann Racing	Chevrolet	23.211	106.398
19	1	Gavan Boschele	Tricon Garage	Toyota	23.223	106.343
20	45	Landen Lewis	Niece Motorsports	Chevrolet	23.223	106.343
21	26	Dawson Sutton	Rackley W.A.R.	Chevrolet	23.235	106.288
22	99	Ben Rhodes	ThorSport Racing	Ford	23.245	106.242
23	5	Harrison Burton (i)	Tricon Garage	Toyota	23.262	106.165
24	16	Justin Haley	Kaulig Racing	Ram	23.306	105.964
25	13	Cole Butcher (R)	ThorSport Racing	Ford	23.316	105.919
26	56	Timmy Hill	Hill Motorsports	Toyota	23.337	105.823
27	81	Kris Wright	McAnally–Hilgemann Racing	Chevrolet	23.345	105.787
28	14	Mini Tyrrell (R)	Kaulig Racing	Ram	23.399	105.543
29	25	Conor Daly	Kaulig Racing	Ram	23.564	104.804
30	10	Corey LaJoie	Kaulig Racing	Ram	23.615	104.578
31	2	Jackson Macenko	Team Reaume	Ford	23.657	104.392
Qualified by owner's points
32	27	Toni Breidinger	Rackley W.A.R.	Chevrolet	23.714	104.141
33	93	Cassten Everidge	Costner Motorsports	Chevrolet	23.782	103.843
34	22	Monty Tipton	Team Reaume	Ford	23.945	103.136
35	33	Frankie Muniz	Team Reaume	Ford	23.965	103.050
36	76	Spencer Boyd	Freedom Racing Enterprises	Chevrolet	24.000	102.900
Failed to qualify
37	90	Justin Carroll	TC Motorsports	Toyota	23.888	103.382
38	69	Jonathan Shafer	MBM Motorsports	Ram	24.043	102.716
Official qualifying results
Official starting lineup

== Race ==
=== Race results ===
==== Stage Results ====
Stage One Laps: 60

Pos.	#	Driver	Team	Make	Pts
1	34	Layne Riggs	Front Row Motorsports	Ford	10
2	91	Christian Eckes	McAnally–Hilgemann Racing	Chevrolet	9
3	38	Chandler Smith	Front Row Motorsports	Ford	8
4	7	Connor Mosack	Spire Motorsports	Chevrolet	7
5	88	Ty Majeski	ThorSport Racing	Ford	6
6	9	Grant Enfinger	CR7 Motorsports	Chevrolet	5
7	77	Nick Sanchez (i)	Spire Motorsports	Chevrolet	0
8	11	Kaden Honeycutt	Tricon Garage	Toyota	3
9	52	Stewart Friesen	Halmar Friesen Racing	Toyota	2
10	42	Parker Eatmon	Niece Motorsports	Chevrolet	1

Stage Two Laps: 60

Pos.	#	Driver	Team	Make	Pts
1	34	Layne Riggs	Front Row Motorsports	Ford	10
2	7	Connor Mosack	Spire Motorsports	Chevrolet	9
3	38	Chandler Smith	Front Row Motorsports	Ford	8
4	9	Grant Enfinger	CR7 Motorsports	Chevrolet	7
5	88	Ty Majeski	ThorSport Racing	Ford	6
6	77	Nick Sanchez (i)	Spire Motorsports	Chevrolet	0
7	52	Stewart Friesen	Halmar Friesen Racing	Toyota	4
8	62	Mike Christopher Jr.	Halmar Friesen Racing	Toyota	3
9	11	Kaden Honeycutt	Tricon Garage	Toyota	2
10	18	Tyler Ankrum	McAnally–Hilgemann Racing	Chevrolet	1

=== Final Stage Results ===
Stage Three Laps: 80

Fin	St	#	Driver	Team	Make	Laps	Led	Status	Pts
1	1	34	Layne Riggs	Front Row Motorsports	Ford	200	198	Running	76
2	7	7	Connor Mosack	Spire Motorsports	Chevrolet	200	0	Running	51
3	9	88	Ty Majeski	ThorSport Racing	Ford	200	0	Running	46
4	2	38	Chandler Smith	Front Row Motorsports	Ford	200	2	Running	49
5	3	77	Nick Sanchez (i)	Spire Motorsports	Chevrolet	200	0	Running	0
6	5	52	Stewart Friesen	Halmar Friesen Racing	Toyota	200	0	Running	37
7	6	11	Kaden Honeycutt	Tricon Garage	Toyota	200	0	Running	35
8	19	1	Gavan Boschele	Tricon Garage	Toyota	200	0	Running	29
9	13	18	Tyler Ankrum	McAnally–Hilgemann Racing	Chevrolet	200	0	Running	29
10	11	62	Mike Christopher Jr.	Halmar Friesen Racing	Toyota	200	0	Running	30
11	10	44	Andrés Pérez de Lara	Niece Motorsports	Chevrolet	200	0	Running	26
12	14	42	Parker Eatmon	Niece Motorsports	Chevrolet	200	0	Running	26
13	16	17	Gio Ruggiero	Tricon Garage	Toyota	200	0	Running	24
14	8	9	Grant Enfinger	CR7 Motorsports	Chevrolet	199	0	Running	35
15	22	99	Ben Rhodes	ThorSport Racing	Ford	199	0	Running	22
16	23	5	Harrison Burton (i)	Tricon Garage	Toyota	199	0	Running	0
17	21	26	Dawson Sutton	Rackley W.A.R.	Chevrolet	198	0	Running	20
18	24	16	Justin Haley	Kaulig Racing	Ram	197	0	Running	19
19	26	56	Timmy Hill	Hill Motorsports	Toyota	197	0	Running	18
20	12	12	Brenden Queen (R)	Kaulig Racing	Ram	197	0	Running	17
21	15	98	Jake Garcia	ThorSport Racing	Ford	197	0	Running	16
22	17	15	Tanner Gray	Tricon Garage	Toyota	197	0	Running	15
23	25	13	Cole Butcher (R)	ThorSport Racing	Ford	197	0	Running	14
24	30	10	Corey LaJoie	Kaulig Racing	Ram	197	0	Running	13
25	32	27	Toni Breidinger	Rackley W.A.R.	Chevrolet	197	0	Running	12
26	29	25	Conor Daly	Kaulig Racing	Ram	197	0	Running	11
27	28	14	Mini Tyrrell (R)	Kaulig Racing	Ram	197	0	Running	10
28	36	76	Spencer Boyd	Freedom Racing Enterprises	Chevrolet	197	0	Running	9
29	35	33	Frankie Muniz	Team Reaume	Ford	196	0	Running	8
30	34	22	Monty Tipton	Team Reaume	Ford	196	0	Running	7
31	27	81	Kris Wright	McAnally–Hilgemann Racing	Chevrolet	196	0	Running	6
32	33	93	Cassten Everidge	Costner Motorsports	Chevrolet	193	0	Running	5
33	4	91	Christian Eckes	McAnally–Hilgemann Racing	Chevrolet	164	0	Running	13
34	18	19	Daniel Hemric	McAnally–Hilgemann Racing	Chevrolet	135	0	Accident	3
35	20	45	Landen Lewis	Niece Motorsports	Chevrolet	135	0	Accident	2
36	31	2	Jackson Macenko	Team Reaume	Ford	74	0	Rear Gear	1
Official race results

=== Race statistics ===
- Lead changes: 2 among 2 different drivers
- Cautions/Laps: 3 for 25 laps
- Red flags: 0
- Time of race: 1 hour, 42 minutes and 8 seconds
- Average speed: 80.601 miles per hour (129.715 km/h)

== Standings after the race ==
Drivers' Championship standings

	Pos	Driver	Points
	1	Layne Riggs	716
	2	Kaden Honeycutt	616 (–100)
	3	Chandler Smith	563 (–153)
	4	Christian Eckes	496 (–220)
	5	Gio Ruggiero	491 (–225)
	6	Ty Majeski	446 (–270)
	7	Ben Rhodes	408 (–308)
1	8	Grant Enfinger	391 (–325)
1	9	Daniel Hemric	379 (–337)
	10	Stewart Friesen	373 (–343)
Official driver's standings

Manufacturers' Championship standings

Pos	Manufacturer	Points
1	Ford	670
2	Toyota	639 (–31)
3	Chevrolet	627 (–43)
4	Ram	413 (–257)

- Note: Only the first 10 positions are included for the driver standings.

Previous race: 2026 FaithFest 250	NASCAR Craftsman Truck Series; 2026 season	Next race: 2026 Black's Tire 250
