= ThorSport Racing =

American racing team

- Owner(s): Duke Thorson; Rhonda Thorson; Mike Curb
- Base: Sandusky, Ohio
- Series: NASCAR Craftsman Truck Series
- Race drivers: 13. TBA; 88. Ty Majeski; 98. TBA; 99. Ben Rhodes
- Manufacturer: Ford
- Opened: 1996

Career
- Debut: Nationwide Series: 2008 Kroger 200 (IRP); Truck Series: 1996 Sears Auto Center 200 (Milwaukee); ARCA Racing Series: 2012 Lucas Oil Slick Mist 200 (Daytona)
- Latest race: Nationwide Series: 2008 Food City 250 (Bristol); Truck Series: 2026 Craftsman 200 (Homestead); ARCA Racing Series: 2014 Lucas Oil 200 (Daytona)
- Races competed: Total: 754; Nationwide Series: 2 Truck Series: 710; ARCA Racing Series: 42
- Drivers' Championships: Total: 7 Nationwide Series: 0 Truck Series: 6; 2013, 2014, 2019, 2021, 2023, 2024; ARCA Racing Series: 1; 2013
- Race victories: Total: 55; Nationwide Series: 0 Truck Series: 49; ARCA Racing Series: 6
- Pole positions: Total: 54; Nationwide Series: 0 Truck Series: 53; ARCA Racing Series: 1

ThorSport Racing is an American professional stock car racing team competing in the NASCAR Craftsman Truck Series. Founded in 1996 as SealMaster Racing and based in Sandusky, Ohio, the team is owned by Duke Thorson and his wife, Rhonda. Currently, it fields four teams: the No. 13 for TBA, the No. 88 for Ty Majeski, the No. 98 for TBA, and the No. 99 for Ben Rhodes. ThorSport has claimed six Truck Series championships: three with Crafton (2013, 2014, 2019), two with Rhodes (2021, 2023), and one with Majeski in 2024. Notably, it is the longest-running team in the Truck Series, with at least one truck in every season since 1996.

== Nationwide Series ==
=== Car No. 13 history ===
In 2008, ThorSport Racing made its Nationwide Series debut with Shelby Howard driving the No. 13 Chevrolet Monte Carlo in two races, starting at Lucas Oil Indianapolis Raceway Park and Bristol. Howard finished twentieth and 23rd in those events.

==== Car No. 13 results ====
Year	Driver	No.	Make	1	2	3	4	5	6	7	8	9	10	11	12	13	14	15	16	17	18	19	20	21	22	23	24	25	26	27	28	29	30	31	32	33	34	35	NNC	Pts
2008	Shelby Howard	13	Chevy	DAY	CAL	LVS	ATL	BRI	NSH	TEX	PHO	MXC	TAL	RCH	DAR	CLT	DOV	NSH	KEN	MLW	NHA	DAY	CHI	GTY	IRP; 20	CGV	GLN	MCH	BRI; 23	CAL	RCH	DOV	KAN	CLT	MEM	TEX	PHO	HOM	94th	197

== Craftsman Truck Series ==
=== Truck No. 8 history ===
In 1998, ThorSport Racing—then known as SealMaster Racing—fielded the No. 8 truck at Mesa Marin for Jerry Cook. Cook started 34th but retired early, finishing 32nd.

In 1999, the team again fielded the No. 8 truck, this time at Phoenix for Joe Ruttman.

==== Truck No. 8 results ====
Year	Driver	No.	Make	1	2	3	4	5	6	7	8	9	10	11	12	13	14	15	16	17	18	19	20	21	22	23	24	25	26	27	NCWTC	Pts
1998	Jerry Cook	8	Chevy	WDW	HOM	PHO	POR	EVG	I70	GLN	TEX	BRI	MLW	NZH	CAL	PPR	IRP	NHA	FLM	NSV	HPT	LVL	RCH	MEM	GTY	MAR	SON	MMR; 32	PHO	LVS	107th	67
1999	Joe Ruttman	8	Chevy	HOM	PHO; 34	EVG	MMR	MAR	MEM	PPR	I70	BRI	TEX	PIR	GLN	MLW	NSV	NZH	MCH	NHA	IRP	GTY	HPT	RCH	LVS	LVL	TEX	CAL				

=== Truck No. 13 history ===
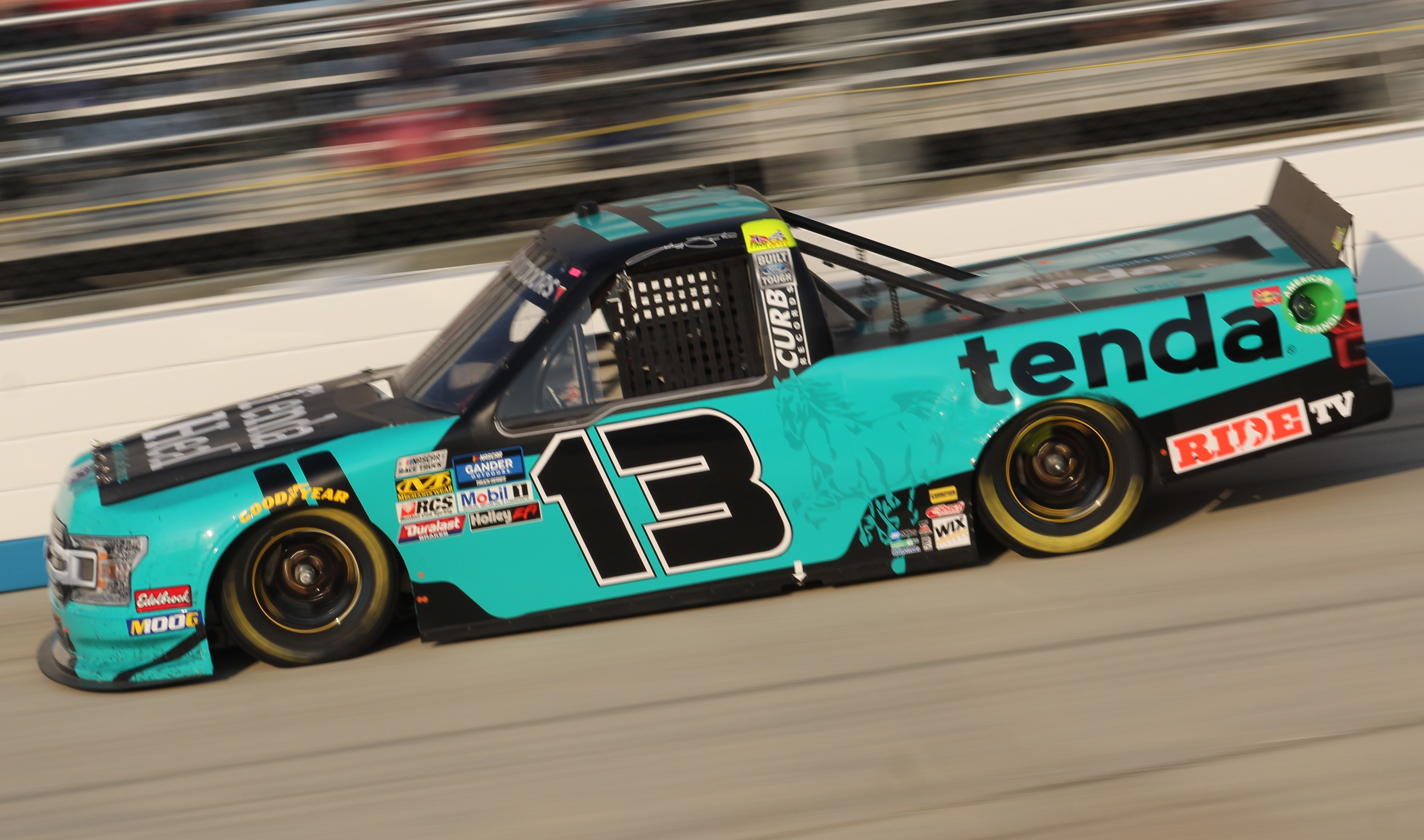
Johnny Sauter in the No. 13 at Dover International Speedway in 2019

==== Multiple drivers (2004–2008) ====
In 2004, the No. 13 truck debuted with Tina Gordon as the driver, backed by sponsorships from Vassarette and Microtel. Gordon left the team after five races due to injuries sustained at Atlanta, and the truck was then driven by Lance Hooper and Paul White for several races. After a string of disappointing finishes, Jimmy Spencer took the wheel at Loudon, achieving an 18th-place finish. Jason Small and Andy Houston closed out the season.

In 2005, Tracy Hines drove the truck, securing a fifth-place finish at Richmond with sponsorship from David Zoriki Motorsports. Hines was released with two races remaining, and Chad Chaffin and Johnny Sauter completed the season in his place.

In 2006, Kerry Earnhardt drove the No. 13 truck, achieving his best finish of 11th place twice—once at Nashville and again at Las Vegas.

In 2007, Earnhardt was not retained for another season, and rookie Willie Allen was signed as his replacement. Allen achieved two top-ten finishes and won Rookie of the Year, but he was replaced at the end of the season by USAR Hooters Pro Cup driver Shelby Howard.

In 2008, Howard achieved two top-ten finishes driving the BobCat Company/FarmPaint.com Chevy but ended the season ranked seventeenth in points and was subsequently released.

==== Johnny Sauter (2009–2012) ====
In 2009, Johnny Sauter returned to ThorSport Racing as a full-time driver with sponsorship from Fun Sand. The team entered a partnership with Mike Curb, and Sauter secured the team's third win at Las Vegas, also achieving ThorSport's first-ever 1-2 finish, with teammate Matt Crafton finishing second. Sauter ended the season 6th in points. In 2010, Sauter earned his second win at Kansas after a late-race incident with Ron Hornaday and finished 3rd in points, behind Todd Bodine.

For 2011, the team gained sponsorship from Safe Auto Insurance. Sauter claimed victories at Martinsville and Homestead, finishing 2nd in points to Austin Dillon. Safe Auto left at the end of the season, and The Peanut Roaster took over as the primary sponsor in 2012. Although Sauter's season was marred by bad luck, he improved late in the year, sweeping both races at Texas and finishing 9th in points.

==== Part Time (2013) ====
In 2013, Todd Bodine became the driver for the season, securing an 11th-place finish at Daytona. Mattei Air Compressors was introduced as the truck's primary sponsor. However, the team struggled to secure additional sponsorship and had to part ways with Bodine after the seventh race. Brett Moffitt, Frank Kimmel, and Tracy Hines each drove a race for the team before it ultimately shut down. Kimmel returned to the No. 13 truck for the season-ending race at Homestead-Miami.

==== Jeb Burton (2014) ====
In 2014, Jeb Burton was hired to drive the No. 13 truck on a race-by-race basis, contingent on sponsorship. His ride was upgraded to a full-season deal when Estes Express Lines signed on as a sponsor. However, the sponsorship was not renewed for 2015, leading the team to release Burton. He later joined BK Racing in the Sprint Cup Series.

==== Multiple drivers (2015–2018) ====
In 2015, Cameron Hayley took over the No. 13 ride, with Cabinets by Hayley signing on as the sponsor. Hayley returned in 2016 but had a challenging season, failing to make it to the Chase and finishing lower in the points standings than the previous year.

In 2017, Hayley did not return and was replaced by Cody Coughlin. Coughlin finished fourteenth in points, leading to his release after the season.

In 2018, Coughlin was released and replaced by Myatt Snider. Snider went on to achieve three top-five finishes and eight top-tens, earning a ninth place finish in the points standings as a rookie.

==== Johnny Sauter (2019–2022) ====
Just days before the Truck Series season opener at Daytona, it was announced that Johnny Sauter would return to the team for the 2019 season. However, Sauter's season was marked by controversy and setbacks. At Iowa, NASCAR parked him for intentionally wrecking Austin Hill under caution, resulting in a one-race suspension.Myatt Snider was named as Sauter's replacement for the race at Gateway. Later in the season, Sauter's playoff hopes were dashed at Las Vegas, where he finished 29th due to an engine failure. The issue, which also affected three other trucks, was traced to severe detonation in Ilmor's NT1 engines, caused by a combination of high engine loads and extreme weather conditions. Although Ilmor took responsibility for the failures, NASCAR rejected ThorSport's request to reinstate Sauter and Grant Enfinger into the playoffs.

On February 21, 2020, the No. 13 team was penalized 10 points for an illegal engine oil reservoir tank discovered during pre-race inspection, ahead of the Las Vegas race. Despite the penalty, Sauter finished second, behind Kyle Busch, marking his best finish of the season. However, he missed the Playoffs for the first time in his career, finishing thirteenth in the final standings. In 2021, Sauter achieved his first top-five finish in 20 races at the Fr8Auctions 200.

In 2022, Sauter's schedule would be reduced from thirteen to just four races, as ThorSport added a new fourth team. Despite the limited number of races, Sauter impressed, coming close to winning at Martinsville Speedway and securing another top-five finish at Gateway.

==== Hailie Deegan (2023) ====
On December 15, 2022, Thorsport announced that Hailie Deegan would drive the No. 13 truck full-time in 2023. The No. 98 team would be renumbered to No. 13, with the No. 98 team transitioning to the new number.

==== Jake Garcia (2024–2025) ====
On November 15, 2023, it was announced that Jake Garcia would move to the No. 13 truck for the 2024 season, replacing Deegan, who is transitioning to a full-time role in the Xfinity Series. Garcia struggled throughout the season, only scoring two top-ten finishes, his best being a sixth place at Charlotte.

Garcia started the 2025 season with a twelfth-place finish at Daytona. At Rockingham, Garcia would earn his first career pole. Garcia was able to qualify for the Playoffs, his first career appearance, but would be eliminated in the first round.

==== Cole Butcher (2026–present) ====
On January 15, 2026, it was announced that Cole Butcher will run full-time in the Truck Series for the 2026 season, driving the No. 13 Ford.

==== Truck No. 13 results ====
Year	Driver	No.	Make	1	2	3	4	5	6	7	8	9	10	11	12	13	14	15	16	17	18	19	20	21	22	23	24	25	Owners	Pts
2004	Tina Gordon	13	Chevy	DAY; 24	ATL; 35	MAR; 30	MFD; 34	CLT; 25																					29th	2110
2004	Lance Hooper	13	Chevy						DOV; 33	TEX; 19	MEM; 25		KAN; 22			MCH; 20				RCH; DNQ									29th	2110
2004	Paul White	13	Chevy									MLW; 30		KEN; 28	GTW; 14		IRP; 30	NSH; 30	BRI; 22										29th	2110
2004	Jimmy Spencer	13	Chevy																		NHA; 18								29th	2110
2004	Rick Bogart	13	Chevy																			LVS; 30							29th	2110
2004	Jason Small	13	Chevy																				CAL; 22	TEX; 33			DAR; 21	HOM; 31	29th	2110
2004	Andy Houston	13	Chevy																						MAR; 25	PHO; 16			29th	2110
2005	Tracy Hines	13	Chevy	DAY; 22	CAL; 33	ATL; 16	MAR; 13	GTY; 25	MFD; 27	CLT; 18	DOV; 25	TEX; 26	MCH; 36	MLW; 32	KAN; 19	KEN; 20	MEM; 16	IRP; 32	NSH; 29	BRI; 24	RCH; 5	NHA; 19	LVS; 36	MAR; 17	ATL; 26	TEX; 35			26th	2269
2005	Chad Chaffin	13	Chevy																								PHO; 35		26th	2269
2005	Johnny Sauter	13	Chevy																									HOM; 20	26th	2269
2006	Kerry Earnhardt	13	Chevy	DAY; 18	CAL; 29	ATL; 34	MAR; 20	GTY; 27	CLT; 20	MFD; 27	DOV; 29	TEX; 34	MCH; 29	MLW; 35	KAN; 25	KEN; 23	MEM; 28	IRP; 23	NSH; 11	BRI; 20	NHA; 19	LVS; 11	TAL; 36	MAR; 33	ATL; 21	TEX; 29	PHO; 27	HOM; 19	28th	2199
2007	Willie Allen	13	Chevy	DAY; 29	CAL; 22	ATL; 13	MAR; 22	KAN; 18	CLT; 21	MFD; 28	DOV; 14	TEX; 28	MCH; 22	MLW; 31	MEM; 23	KEN; 15	IRP; 29	NSH; 29	BRI; 19	GTW; 12	NHA; 28	LVS; 23	TAL; 6	MAR; 14	ATL; 20	TEX; 11	PHO; 17	HOM; 28	21st	2524
2008	Shelby Howard	13	Chevy	DAY; 15	CAL; 25	ATL; 26	MAR; 34	KAN; 16	CLT; 20	MFD; 6	DOV; 19	TEX; 20	MCH; 19	MLW; 14	MEM; 16	KEN; 36	IRP; 5	NSH; 22	BRI; 26	GTW; 23	NHA; 14	LVS; 18	TAL; 17	MAR; 13	ATL; 22	TEX; 17	PHO; 19	HOM; 25	23rd	2636
2009	Johnny Sauter	13	Chevy	DAY; 27	CAL; 17	ATL; 18	MAR; 27	KAN; 9	CLT; 13	DOV; 5	TEX; 6	MCH; 16	MLW; 14	MEM; 8	KEN; 22	IRP; 14	NSH; 6	BRI; 18	CHI; 5	IOW; 5	GTW; 2	NHA; 5	LVS; 1*	MAR; 16	TAL; 14	TEX; 6	PHO; 5	HOM; 9	8th	3331
2010	Johnny Sauter	13	Chevy	DAY; 35	ATL; 8	MAR; 15	NSH; 11	KAN; 1*	DOV; 15	CLT; 12	TEX; 2	MCH; 14	IOW; 2	GTY; 3	IRP; 4	POC; 14	NSH; 5	DAR; 4	BRI; 11	CHI; 4	KEN; 2	NHA; 7	LVS; 2	MAR; 21	TAL; 3	TEX; 2	PHO; 3	HOM; 3	4th	3676
2011	Johnny Sauter	13	Chevy	DAY; 17	PHO; 4	DAR; 9	MAR; 1	NSH; 7	DOV; 11	CLT; 6	KAN; 2	TEX; 22	KEN; 24	IOW; 4	NSH; 2	IRP; 23	POC; 4	MCH; 13	BRI; 2	ATL; 29	CHI; 6	NHA; 5	KEN; 14	LVS; 4	TAL; 15	MAR; 4	TEX; 7	HOM; 1	4th	882
2012	Johnny Sauter	13	Toyota	DAY; 24	MAR; 29	CAR; 4	KAN; 24	CLT; 25	DOV; 24	TEX; 1	KEN; 6	IOW; 4	CHI; 22	POC; 27	MCH; 11	BRI; 11	ATL; 12	IOW; 4	KEN; 6	LVS; 21	TAL; 2	MAR; 14	TEX; 1	PHO; 25	HOM; 6				10th	678
2013	Todd Bodine	13	Toyota	DAY; 11	MAR; 11	CAR; 32	KAN; 21	CLT; 17	DOV; 19	TEX; 18																			29th	285
2013	Brett Moffitt	13	Toyota								KEN; 14																		29th	285
2013	Frank Kimmel	13	Toyota									IOW; 21													HOM; 24				29th	285
2013	Tracy Hines	13	Toyota										ELD; 13	POC	MCH	BRI	MSP	IOW	CHI	LVS	TAL	MAR	TEX	PHO					29th	285
2014	Jeb Burton	13	Toyota	DAY; 7	MAR; 21	KAN; 6	CLT; 15	DOV; 18	TEX; 12	GTW; 18	KEN; 27	IOW; 14	ELD; 7	POC; 16	MCH; 8	BRI; 11	MSP; 17	CHI; 5	NHA; 12	LVS; 8	TAL; 16	MAR; 12	TEX; 2	PHO; 25	HOM; 13				12th	679
2015	Cameron Hayley	13	Toyota	DAY; 23	ATL; 14	MAR; 11	KAN; 5	CLT; 14	DOV; 21	TEX; 7	GTW; 5	IOW; 19	KEN; 9	ELD; 8	POC; 4	MCH; 10	BRI; 18	MSP; 7	CHI; 16	NHA; 12	LVS; 10	TAL; 6	MAR; 3	TEX; 10	PHO; 11	HOM; 9			8th	766
2016	Cameron Hayley	13	Toyota	DAY; 25	ATL; 2	MAR; 9	KAN; 19	DOV; 19	CLT; 15	TEX; 18	IOW; 3	GTW; 24	KEN; 6	ELD; 7	POC; 2	BRI; 24	MCH; 5	MSP; 9	CHI; 3	NHA; 19	LVS; 18	TAL; 19	MAR; 11	TEX; 10	PHO; 4	HOM; 16			12th	476
2017	Cody Coughlin	13	Toyota	DAY; 11	ATL; 16	MAR; 19	KAN; 26	CLT; 16	DOV; 16	TEX; 18	GTW; 12	IOW; 12	KEN; 15	ELD; 11	POC; 8	MCH; 21	BRI; 17	MSP; 21	CHI; 11	NHA; 17	LVS; 6	TAL; 25	MAR; 20	TEX; 16	PHO; 3	HOM; 14			14th	511
2018	Myatt Snider	13	Ford	DAY; 24	ATL; 7	LVS; 15	MAR; 6	DOV; 11	KAN; 15	CLT; 15	TEX; 23	IOW; 10	GTW; 4	CHI; 10	KEN; 26	ELD; 20	POC; 12	MCH; 18	BRI; 29	MSP; 19	LVS; 6	TAL; 2	MAR; 3	TEX; 13	PHO; 22	HOM; 14			12th	611
2019	Johnny Sauter	13	Ford	DAY; 23	ATL; 2	LVS; 8	MAR; 9	TEX; 3	DOV; 1	KAN; 22	CLT; 17	TEX; 13	IOW; 27		CHI; 18	KEN; 10	POC; 8	ELD; 21	MCH; 12	BRI; 11	MSP; 6	LVS; 29	TAL; 14*	MAR; 3	PHO; 8	HOM; 6			6th	2237
2019	Myatt Snider	13	Ford											GTW; 10															6th	2237
2020	Johnny Sauter	13	Ford	DAY; 7	LVS; 2	CLT; 7	ATL; 40	HOM; 5	POC; 13	KEN; 4	TEX; 33	KAN; 9	KAN; 33	MCH; 16	DAY; 21	DOV; 6	GTW; 33	DAR; 31	RCH; 27	BRI; 9	LVS; 11	TAL; 11	KAN; 18	TEX; 23	MAR; 23	PHO; 11			15th	523
2021	Johnny Sauter	13	Toyota	DAY; 27	DAY; 18	LVS; 15	ATL; 4	BRI; 32	RCH; 5	KAN; 9	DAR; 6	COA; 22	CLT; 31	TEX; 12	NSH; 12	POC; 35	KNX; 20	GLN; 23	GTW; 5	DAR; 8	BRI; 5	LVS; 4	TAL; 30	MAR; 31	PHO; 11				13th	505
2022	Johnny Sauter	13	Toyota	DAY	LVS	ATL	COA	MAR; 2	BRI	DAR	KAN	TEX	CLT	GTW; 5	SON	KNO	NSH	MOH	POC	IRP; 12	RCH	KAN	BRI	TAL; 25	HOM	PHO			38th	104
2023	Hailie Deegan	13	Ford	DAY; 35	LVS; 32	ATL; 12	COA; 16	TEX; 6	BRD; 13	MAR; 20	KAN; 12	DAR; 20	NWS; 20	CLT; 33	GTW; 32	NSH; 28	MOH; 26	POC; 13	RCH; 15	IRP; 31	MLW; 22	KAN; 30	BRI; 17	TAL; 8	HOM; 28	PHO; 15			22nd	385
2024	Jake Garcia	13	Ford	DAY; 34	ATL; 16	LVS; 11	BRI; 14	COA; 14	MAR; 21	TEX; 19	KAN; 17	DAR; 20	NWS; 21	CLT; 6	GTW; 24	NSH; 10	POC; 21	IRP; 30	RCH; 13	MLW; 21	BRI; 21	KAN; 21	TAL; 29	HOM; 24	MAR; 20	PHO; 14			21st	459
2025	Jake Garcia	13	Ford	DAY; 12	ATL; 9	LVS; 26	HOM; 7	MAR; 3	BRI; 7	CAR; 2	TEX; 21	KAN; 7	NWS; 12	CLT; 11	NSH; 12	MCH; 7	POC; 28	LRP; 24	IRP; 15	GLN; 15	RCH; 7	DAR; 10	BRI; 33	NHA; 16	ROV; 23	TAL; 29	MAR; 18	PHO; 6	14th	656
2026	Cole Butcher	13	Ford	DAY; 14	ATL; 31	STP; 14	DAR; 28	CAR; 10	BRI; 28	TEX; 35	GLN; 35	DOV; 33	CLT; 27	NSH; 16	MCH; 33	COR; 15	LRP; 11	NWS; 22	IRP; 23	RCH; 22	NHA; 17	BRI; 28	KAN; 12	CLT; 18	PHO; 18	TAL; 29	MAR; 22	HOM; 22	26th	378

=== Truck No. 22 history ===
Part Time (2001)

In 2001, Lance Hooper drove the No. 22 truck for ThorSport Racing at Milwaukee.

==== Truck No. 22 results ====
Year	Driver	No.	Make	1	2	3	4	5	6	7	8	9	10	11	12	13	14	15	16	17	18	19	20	21	22	23	24	NCWTC	Pts
2001	Lance Hooper	22	Chevy	DAY	HOM	MMR	MAR	GTY	DAR	PPR	DOV	TEX	MEM	MLW; 35	KAN	KEN	NHA	IRP	NSH	CIC	NZH	RCH	SBO	TEX	LVS	PHO	CAL		

=== Truck No. 27 history ===
==== Ben Rhodes (2017) ====
In 2017, Ben Rhodes moved from the No. 41 truck to the No. 27, where he ran full-time with Safelite AutoGlass as his season sponsor. He secured his first victory at Las Vegas, holding off Truck Series champion Christopher Bell, and finished fifth in the point standings.

==== Part-time (2018–2019) ====
On July 16, 2018, Chase Briscoe joined ThorSport Racing and won the Eldora Dirt Derby, marking his first NASCAR Truck Series victory since 2017.

For the 2019 NextEra Energy 250, Myatt Snider drove the No. 27 Ford F-150 at Daytona and Martinsville. Briscoe took over the No. 27 for the Eldora Dirt Derby. After leading the majority of the race and winning the first two stages, a late crash resulted in a seventh place finish.

==== Truck No. 27 results ====
Year	Driver	No.	Make	1	2	3	4	5	6	7	8	9	10	11	12	13	14	15	16	17	18	19	20	21	22	23	Owners	Pts
2017	Ben Rhodes	27	Toyota	DAY; 12	ATL; 4	MAR; 20	KAN; 23	CLT; 8	DOV; 4*	TEX; 5	GTW; 8	IOW; 14	KEN; 27	ELD; 30	POC; 2	MCH; 11	BRI; 5	MSP; 10	CHI; 6	NHA; 7	LVS; 1	TAL; 23	MAR; 9	TEX; 18	PHO; 20	HOM; 19	10th	794
2018	Chase Briscoe	27	Ford	DAY	ATL	LVS	MAR	DOV	KAN	CLT	TEX	IOW	GTW	CHI	KEN	ELD; 1*	POC	MCH	BRI	MSP	LVS	TAL	MAR	TEX	PHO	HOM	43rd	58
2019	Myatt Snider	27	Ford	DAY; 21	ATL	LVS	MAR; 6	TEX	DOV	KAN	CLT	TEX	IOW	GTW	CHI	KEN	POC										36th	106
2019	Chase Briscoe	27	Ford															ELD; 7*	MCH	BRI	MSP	LVS	TAL	MAR	PHO	HOM	36th	106

=== Truck No. 41 history ===
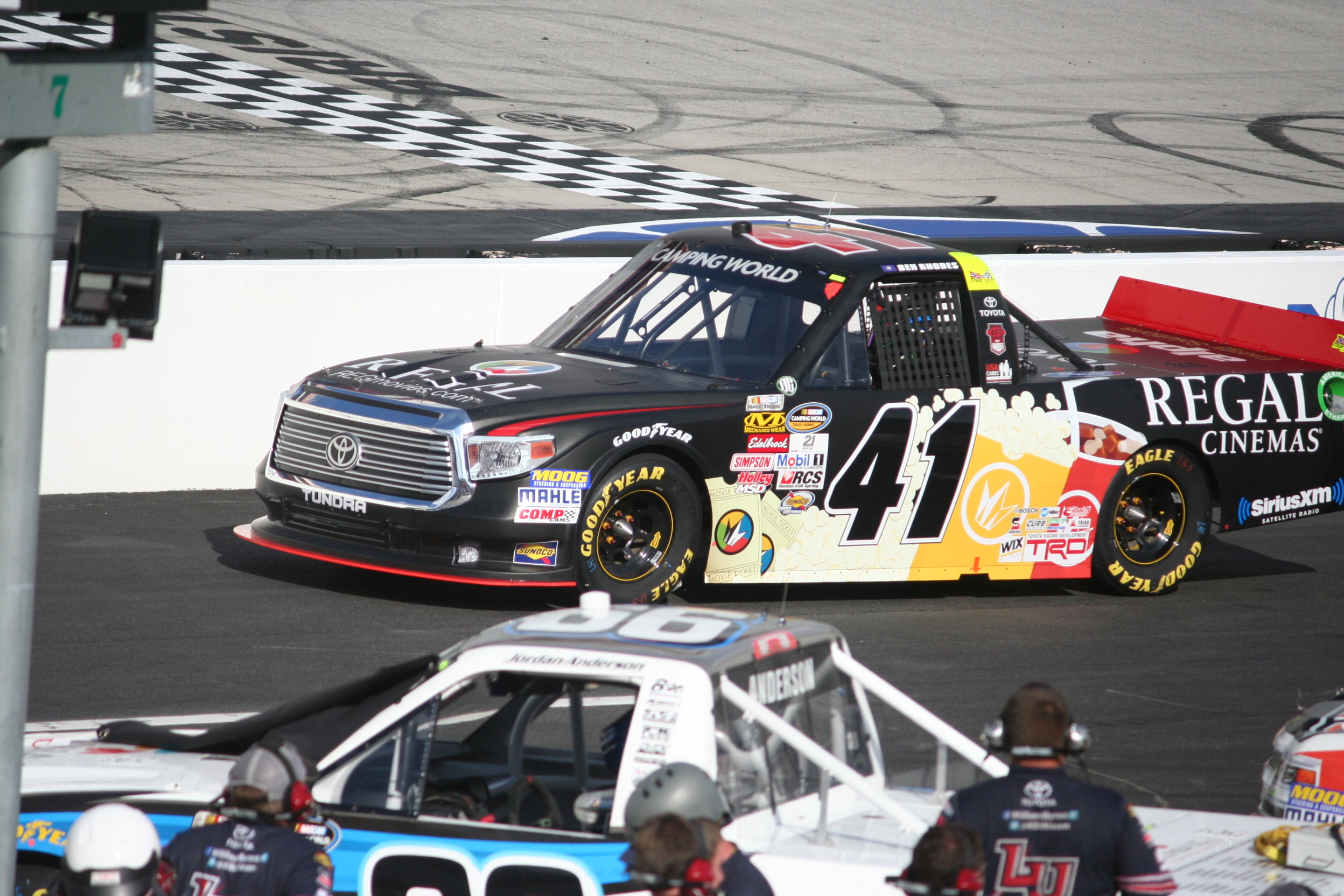
Ben Rhodes in the No. 41 at Bristol Motor Speedway in 2016

==== Ben Rhodes (2016, 2018) ====
On December 15, 2015, Ben Rhodes joined the team for 2016, driving a new fourth truck, numbered 41, with sponsorship from Alpha Energy Solutions. He recorded two top-five finishes and five top-ten finishes that season. Rhodes had a chance to win at Kansas Speedway but was involved in a last-lap incident with Johnny Sauter, which allowed William Byron to take the victory. In 2018, the No. 41 truck returned with Rhodes behind the wheel, and he secured a win at Kentucky Speedway during the summer.

==== Truck No. 41 results ====
Year	Driver	No.	Make	1	2	3	4	5	6	7	8	9	10	11	12	13	14	15	16	17	18	19	20	21	22	23	Owners	Pts	Ref
2016	Ben Rhodes	41	Toyota	DAY; 7	ATL; 6	MAR; 16	KAN; 18	DOV; 28	CLT; 17	TEX; 11	IOW; 4	GTW; 2	KEN; 13	ELD; 23	POC; 11	BRI; 30	MCH; 6	MSP; 30	CHI; 25	NHA; 15	LVS; 12	TAL; 24	MAR; 19	TEX; 15	PHO; 14	HOM; 20	17th	387	
2018	Ben Rhodes	41	Ford	DAY; 4	ATL; 4	LVS; 7	MAR; 12*	DOV; 8	KAN; 18	CLT; 5	TEX; 16	IOW; 17	GTW; 19	CHI; 2	KEN; 1	ELD; 29	POC; 11	MCH; 6	BRI; 7	MSP; 14	LVS; 4	TAL; 16	MAR; 4	TEX; 2	PHO; 12	HOM; 10	6th	2249	

=== Truck No. 66 history ===
==== Part-time (2021) ====
In 2021, Ty Majeski was scheduled to drive the No. 66 truck at Charlotte Motor Speedway and Nashville Superspeedway. Later, retired driver Paul Menard made a return to the series, driving at Circuit of the Americas. Majeski also participated in an additional race at Pocono Raceway, while Menard returned again to compete at Watkins Glen.

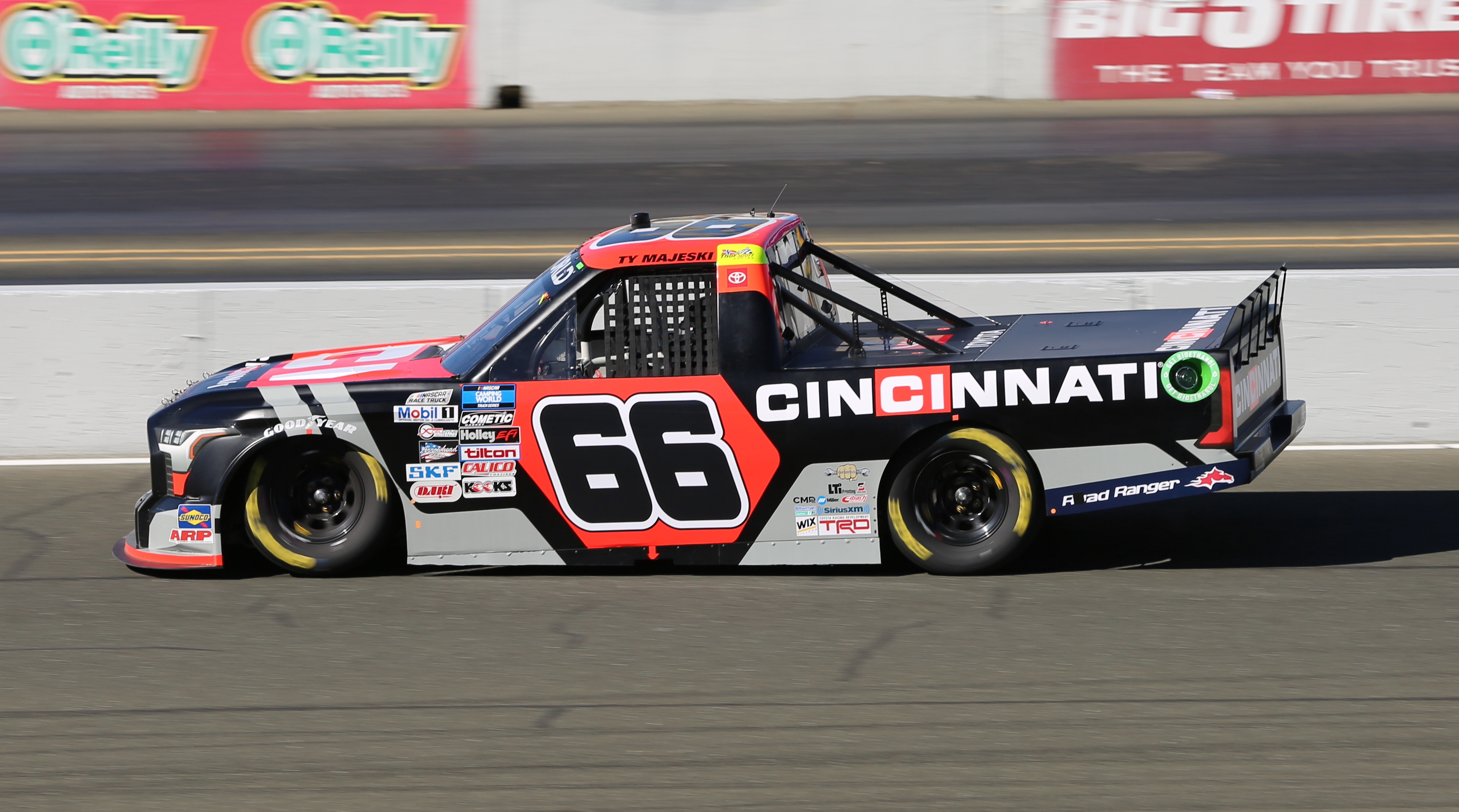
Ty Majeski in the No. 66 at Sonoma Raceway in 2022

==== Ty Majeski (2022) ====
In 2022, it was announced that Ty Majeski would drive the No. 66 car full-time. He made the playoffs by staying consistent with seven top-five and ten top-ten finishes. During the playoffs, Majeski secured wins at Bristol and Homestead, which helped him lock in a spot in the Championship 4. However, he finished 20th at Phoenix after a late spin, resulting in a fourth-place finish in the standings.

==== Part-time (2023–2026) ====
In 2023, Majeski moved to the No. 98 entry, leaving the No. 66 to become a part-time entry with Conner Jones driving for nine races. Joey Logano dominated the Bristol dirt race, leading 138 of 150 laps before claiming the victory. During the 2024 Baptist Health 200, Jones intentionally sent Matt Mills into the Turn 3 wall, resulting in Mills being transported to the hospital. As a consequence, Jones was parked for two laps. On October 30, NASCAR suspended Jones for the Martinsville race, and Johnny Sauter was named as his replacement driver.

==== Truck No. 66 results ====
Year	Driver	No.	Make	1	2	3	4	5	6	7	8	9	10	11	12	13	14	15	16	17	18	19	20	21	22	23	24	25	Owners	Pts
2021	Paul Menard	66	Toyota	DAY	DAY	LVS	ATL	BRI	RCH	KAN	DAR	COA; 11						GLN; 8											39th	168
2021	Ty Majeski	66	Toyota										CLT; 7	TEX	NSH; 8	POC; 14	KNX		GTW; 33	DAR	BRI	LVS	TAL	MAR	PHO				39th	168
2022	Ty Majeski	66	Toyota	DAY; 7	LVS; 10	ATL; 3	COA; 30	MAR; 11	BRI; 21	DAR; 4	KAN; 2	TEX; 5	CLT; 13	GTW; 32	SON; 3	KNX; 4	NSH; 4	MOH; 12	POC; 7	IRP; 8	RCH; 3	KAN; 8	BRI; 1	TAL; 23	HOM; 1	PHO; 20			4th	4017
2023	Joey Logano	66	Ford	DAY	LVS	ATL	COA	TEX	BRD; 1*																				33rd	198
2023	Conner Jones	66	Ford							MAR; 18	KAN	DAR	NWS; 29	CLT	GTW; 33		MOH; 28	POC	RCH; 20	IRP; 27	MLW; 18	KAN	BRI; 15	TAL	HOM	PHO; 34			33rd	198
2023	Jake Drew	66	Ford													NSH; 12													33rd	198
2024	Conner Jones	66	Ford	DAY	ATL; 29	LVS; 14	BRI; 19	COA		TEX; 18		DAR; 24	NWS; 35	CLT; 11		NSH; 12			RCH; 31	MLW; 22	BRI; 36	KAN	TAL	HOM; 25		PHO; 19			28th	297
2024	Cam Waters	66	Ford						MAR; 30		KAN; 19																		28th	297
2024	Luke Fenhaus	66	Ford												GTW; 10		POC; 22	IRP; 7											28th	297
2024	Johnny Sauter	66	Ford																						MAR; 28				28th	297
2025	Johnny Sauter	66	Ford	DAY; 17																									25th	399
2025	Luke Fenhaus	66	Ford		ATL; 14	LVS; 23	HOM; 20		BRI; 22	CAR; 26	TEX; 27			CLT; 18	NSH; 18	MCH; 3			IRP; 12		RCH; 22	DAR	BRI	NHA	ROV	TAL; 29	MAR		25th	399
2025	Luke Baldwin	66	Ford					MAR; 22				KAN; 30	NWS; 13				POC; 12											PHO; 16	25th	399
2025	Cam Waters	66	Ford															LRP; 5											25th	399
2025	Chris Buescher	66	Ford																	GLN; 22									25th	399
2026	Matt Crafton	66	Ford	DAY	ATL	STP	DAR	CAR	BRI	TEX	GLN	DOV	CLT	NSH	MCH	COR	LRP	NWS	IRP	RCH	NHA	BRI	KAN	CLT	PHO	TAL	MAR	HOM; 25	44th	12

=== Truck No. 87 history ===
Part-time (2006)

In 2006, ThorSport Racing fielded the No. 87 truck for driver Willie Allen.

==== Truck No. 87 results ====
Year	Driver	No.	Make	1	2	3	4	5	6	7	8	9	10	11	12	13	14	15	16	17	18	19	20	21	22	23	24	25	Owners	pts
2006	Willie Allen	87	Chevy	DAY	CAL	ATL	MAR	GTY	CLT	MFD	DOV	TEX	MCH	MLW	KAN	KEN	MEM	IRP	NSH	BRI	NHA	LVS	TAL	MAR	ATL	TEX	PHO	HOM; 25	55th	0

=== Truck No. 88 history ===
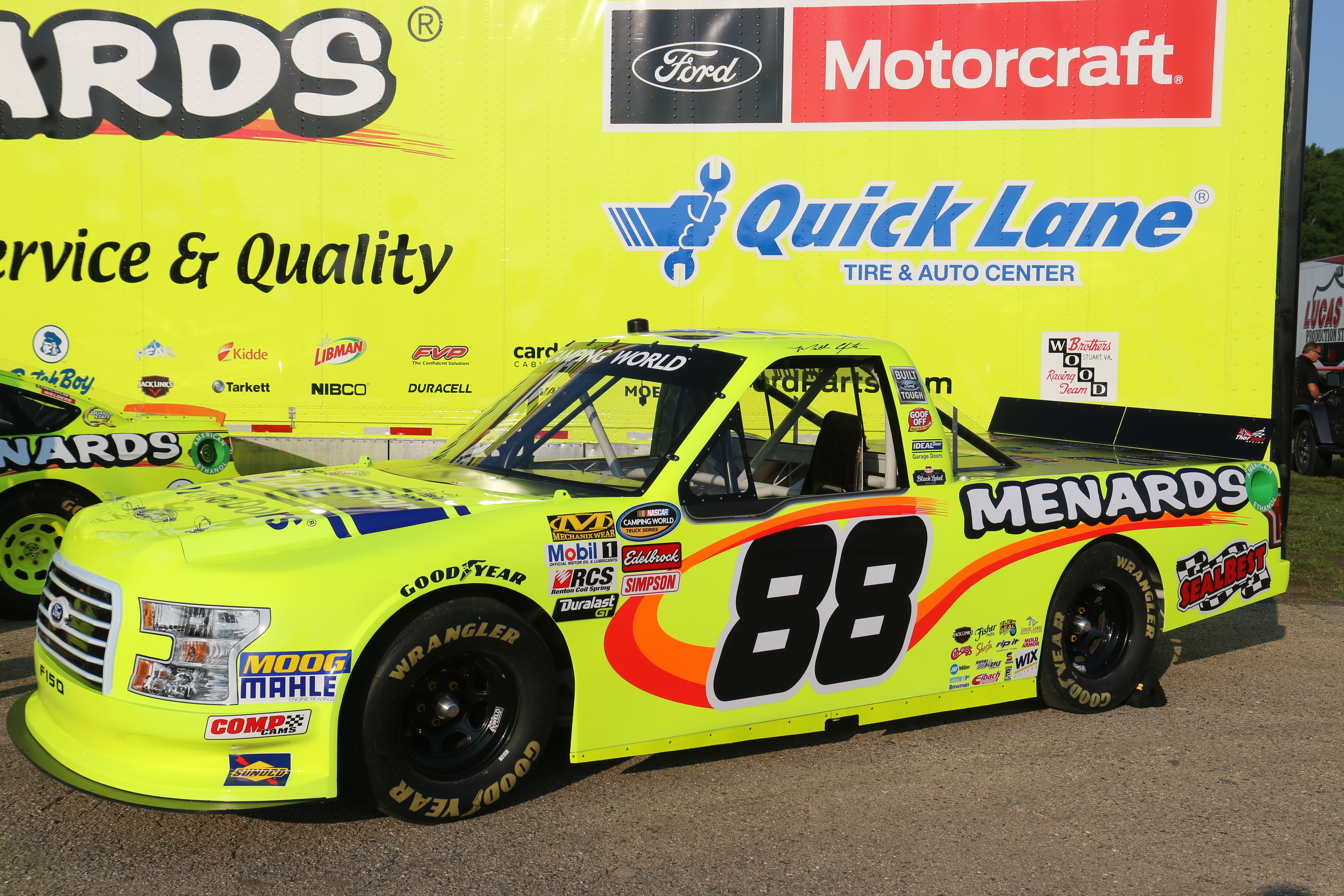
The No. 88 truck in 2018

==== Terry Cook (1996–2000) ====
The No. 88 truck made its debut in the 1996 season at the Milwaukee Mile, driven by Terry Cook for what was then Sealmaster Racing. Cook finished 12th in that race and competed in two more races that season, but his best finish was 21st. In 1997, Cook drove a limited schedule for the team in the PBA Tour Chevy. Although he didn't secure any top-ten finishes, he earned his first career pole at Flemington Speedway and ended the season ranked 24th in the standings.

The team secured sufficient funding to compete full-time in 1998, with Cook achieving his first career victory at Flemington. Despite this milestone, he finished the season in twentieth place in the standings. Entering 1999, ThorSport initially lacked a primary sponsor, but Big Daddy's BBQ Sauce came on board late in the season, helping Cook improve to fifteenth in points. In 2000, PickupTruck.com became the team's primary sponsor. Cook delivered eight top-ten finishes that year but was replaced by Matt Crafton for the season's final race, where Crafton secured a ninth-place finish.

==== Matt Crafton (2001–2003) ====
Fast Master Driveway Sealer and XE Sighting System shared sponsorship responsibilities for Crafton during his rookie season in 2002, when he drove full-time for the team. That year, Crafton earned eleven top-ten finishes and ended the season twelfth in the standings. Although Menards became the team's full-time sponsor in 2002, Crafton managed only six top-ten finishes and dropped to fifteenth in the standings. However, he rebounded in 2003, improving to eleventh overall. For the 2003 season finale at Homestead–Miami Speedway, Buddy Rice drove the No. 88 truck, finishing twentieth, while Crafton moved to the No. 98.

==== Tracy Hines (2004) ====
In 2004, rookie Tracy Hines joined the team as the new driver, securing three top-ten finishes and finishing eighteenth in the points standings.

==== Matt Crafton (2005–2025) ====
In 2005, Crafton returned to the No. 88 truck, winning his first career pole at New Hampshire Motor Speedway and finishing ninth in points, a team-best. In 2006, he slipped to fourteenth in points despite earning ten top-ten finishes. He repeated that top-ten total in 2007, moving up to eighth in points. The team's best year to that point came in 2008, when Crafton scored his first win at Charlotte and finished fifth in points. Although he didn't win in 2009, the No. 88 team finished runner-up in points to Ron Hornaday Jr.

In 2010, Crafton had another strong season, earning one pole at Texas Motor Speedway, 10 top-five finishes, and twenty top-ten finishes, which resulted in a season-ending ranking of fourth. In 2011, Crafton secured the second win of his career at Iowa Speedway, along with poles at Michigan International Speedway and Martinsville Speedway, where he set a new track qualifying record. However, four DNFs (Did Not Finish) due to engine failures, mechanical issues, and accidents caused by other competitors limited him to just five top-five finishes and thirteen top-tens, leaving him in eighth place in the final standings. In 2012, Crafton had a solid season, finishing sixth in points.

In 2013, Crafton had the best season of his career. He won his third career race at Kansas in April, and after that victory, he took the points lead, holding onto it for the rest of the season. Crafton finished in the top-ten in the first sixteen races and in the top-nineteen overall, with his worst finish being 21st in the season finale at Homestead. He clinched his first Truck Series championship by starting that race, and despite sustaining late crash damage, he managed to stay on the lead lap, becoming the first driver in Truck Series history to complete every lap of the season.

In 2014, Crafton secured his fourth career Truck Series win at Martinsville. On June 6, he won at Texas Motor Speedway, utilizing a fuel strategy to claim two victories in a season for the first time in his career. It was also the first time he led more than 100 laps in a race. Despite crashing out at Dover and Gateway—his first DNFs in over two years—and dropping to 17 top-ten finishes, Crafton went on to become the first driver to win back-to-back championships in the Truck Series.

In 2015, Crafton secured his sixth career victory on February 28 in the revived Hyundai Construction Equipment 200 at Atlanta. In May, he used a smart fuel strategy to win at Kansas, marking his first career repeat victory at a single track and the first repeat win by any driver at Kansas in the Truck Series. In June, Crafton defended his previous season's victory at Texas, another career milestone. He added a fourth win of the season in July at Kentucky, after the race was shortened by Ben Kennedy's crash into the catch fence. Crafton went on to win at Martinsville and the season finale at Homestead, finishing third in the points despite several crashes.

Crafton finished as the runner-up in 2016 and fourth in 2017 under the new "Playoffs" system. In 2018, he placed 6th in the standings, marking his first winless season since 2012. Despite also going winless in 2019, Crafton made his third Championship 4 appearance and secured his third career Truck Series Championship, finishing ahead of Ross Chastain by two spots.

In 2020, the No. 88 team was penalized ten owner and driver points before the Las Vegas race due to the discovery of an illegal engine oil reservoir tank during pre-race inspection. That season, Crafton ended his winless streak by securing a victory at Kansas, along with runner-up finishes at Dover and Richmond, which placed him fifth in the final point standings. In 2021, Crafton did not win any races but still made the Championship 4. He finished 12th at Phoenix and placed fourth in the final standings.

In 2022, Crafton barely made the playoffs, narrowly holding off Derek Kraus for the final spot. He was eliminated at Kansas and finished ninth in the final standings.

In 2023, Crafton made the playoffs again without winning a race, but was eliminated at Kansas. After the Talladega fall race, Crafton confronted Nick Sanchez in the garage area following an on-track incident in which their trucks made contact, triggering a multi-truck pileup. As a result, NASCAR fined Crafton $25,000 for the altercation.

==== Ty Majeski (2026) ====
On August 18, 2025, Thorsport announced Crafton's retirement from full-time racing after the 2025 season. In that same announcement, Ty Majeski was announced to be replacing Crafton in the No. 88 truck.

==== Truck No. 88 results ====
Year	Driver	No.	Make	1	2	3	4	5	6	7	8	9	10	11	12	13	14	15	16	17	18	19	20	21	22	23	24	25	26	27	NCTC	Pts	Ref
1996	Terry Cook	88	Chevy	HOM	PHO	POR	EVG	TUS	CNS	HPT	BRI	NZH	MLW; 12	LVL	I70	IRP; DNQ	FLM	GLN	NSV; 25	RCH	NHA	MAR	NWS	SON	MMR	PHO; 21	LVS; DNQ				51st	371	
1997	Terry Cook	88	Chevy	WDW; DNQ	TUS; DNQ	HOM; DNQ	PHO; 19	POR	EVG	I70; 23	NHA; 25	TEX; 33	BRI; 27	NZH; 15	MLW; 27	LVL; 15	CNS; 19	HPT; 24	IRP; 24	FLM; 18	NSV; 33	GLN; DNQ	RCH; DNQ	MAR; DNQ	SON	MMR	CAL; 23	PHO; 28	LVS; DNQ		24th	1651	
1998	Terry Cook	88	Chevy	WDW; 21	HOM; 38	PHO; 16	POR; 31	EVG; 29	I70; 20	GLN; 24	TEX; 10	BRI; 14	MLW; 32	NZH; 34	CAL; 19	PPR; 23	IRP; 20	NHA; 12	FLM; 1	NSV; 25	HPT; 2	LVL; 5	RCH; 9	MEM; 8	GTY; 22	MAR; 22	SON; 30	MMR; 11	PHO; 22	LVS; 34	20th	2845	
1999	Terry Cook	88	Chevy	HOM; 19	PHO; 19	EVG; 26	MMR; 15	MAR; 25	MEM; 13	PPR; 17	I70; 12	BRI; 15	TEX; 22	PIR; 4	GLN; 12	MLW; 16	NSV; 20	NZH; 14	MCH; 13	NHA; 12	IRP; 17	GTY; 15	HPT; 19	RCH; 24	LVS; 10	LVL; 23	TEX; 6	CAL; 31			15th	2838	
2000	Terry Cook	88	Chevy	DAY; 4	HOM; 8	PHO; 14	MMR; 7	MAR; 30	PIR; 22	GTY; 9	MEM; 31	PPR; 17	EVG; 13	TEX; 19	KEN; 35	GLN; 11	MLW; 21	NHA; 17	NZH; 6	MCH; 9	IRP; 28	NSV; 11	CIC; 8	RCH; 30	DOV; 14	TEX; 17					–	2943	
2000	Matt Crafton	88	Chevy																								CAL; 9				–	2943	
2001	Matt Crafton	88	Chevy	DAY; 27	HOM; 26	MMR; 30	MAR; 6	GTY; 7	DAR; 8	PPR; 6	DOV; 9	TEX; 16	MEM; 10	MLW; 9	KAN; 22	KEN; 21	NHA; 10	IRP; 7	NSH; 25	CIC; 26	NZH; 22	RCH; 32	SBO; 10	TEX; 12	LVS; 28	PHO; 15	CAL; 9				12th	2778	
2002	Matt Crafton	88	Chevy	DAY; 23	DAR; 14	MAR; 20	GTY; 10	PPR; 29	DOV; 27	TEX; 7	MEM; 21	MLW; 29	KAN; 10	KEN; 17	NHA; 13	MCH; 16	IRP; 10	NSH; 18	RCH; 32	TEX; 23	SBO; 12	LVS; 25	CAL; 17	PHO; 9	HOM; 9						15th	2424	
2003	Matt Crafton	88	Chevy	DAY; 12	DAR; 11	MMR; 29	MAR; 13	CLT; 9	DOV; 22	TEX; 10	MEM; 10	MLW; 9	KAN; 19	KEN; 7	GTW; 10	MCH; 25	IRP; 10	NSH; 10	BRI; 6	RCH; 14	NHA; 10	CAL; 14	LVS; 9	SBO; 16	TEX; 12	MAR; 28	PHO; 14				–	3177	
2003	Buddy Rice	88	Chevy																									HOM; 20			–	3177	
2004	Tracy Hines	88	Chevy	DAY; 20	ATL; 16	MAR; 29	MFD; 5	CLT; 34	DOV; 21	TEX; 16	MEM; 14	MLW; 14	KAN; 14	KEN; 17	GTW; 15	MCH; 16	IRP; 9	NSH; 22	BRI; 21	RCH; 19	NHA; 30	LVS; 18	CAL; 31	TEX; 19	MAR; 35	PHO; 34	DAR; 13	HOM; 13			18th	2604	
2005	Matt Crafton	88	Chevy	DAY; 11	CAL; 6	ATL; 14	MAR; 15	GTY; 17	MFD; 19	CLT; 9	DOV; 9	TEX; 5	MCH; 22	MLW; 18	KAN; 27	KEN; 7	MEM; 7	IRP; 4	NSH; 13	BRI; 12	RCH; 7	NHA; 35	LVS; 11	MAR; 12	ATL; 22	TEX; 17	PHO; 8	HOM; 10			9th	3095	
2006	Matt Crafton	88	Chevy	DAY; 26	CAL; 20	ATL; 9	MAR; 3	GTY; 12	CLT; 8	MFD; 6	DOV; 15	TEX; 12	MCH; 5	MLW; 34	KAN; 20	KEN; 7	MEM; 3	IRP; 20	NSH; 9	BRI; 12	NHA; 8	LVS; 21	TAL; 18	MAR; 34	ATL; 12	TEX; 15	PHO; 5	HOM; 12			14th	3102	
2007	Matt Crafton	88	Chevy	DAY; 8	CAL; 11	ATL; 3	MAR; 17	KAN; 10	CLT; 7	MFD; 35	DOV; 26	TEX; 7	MCH; 34	MLW; 9	MEM; 10	KEN; 16	IRP; 14	NSH; 11	BRI; 12	GTW; 9	NHA; 11	LVS; 26	TAL; 18	MAR; 18	ATL; 7	TEX; 7	PHO; 14	HOM; 12			8th	3060	
2008	Matt Crafton	88	Chevy	DAY; 24	CAL; 15	ATL; 4	MAR; 2	KAN; 21	CLT; 1	MFD; 12	DOV; 5	TEX; 7	MCH; 15	MLW; 2	MEM; 3	KEN; 3	IRP; 4	NSH; 11	BRI; 21	GTW; 12	NHA; 12	LVS; 3	TAL; 16	MAR; 8	ATL; 29	TEX; 19	PHO; 8	HOM; 17			5th	3392	
2009	Matt Crafton	88	Chevy	DAY; 8	CAL; 7	ATL; 11	MAR; 9	KAN; 7	CLT; 3	DOV; 6	TEX; 2	MCH; 4	MLW; 16	MEM; 5	KEN; 3	IRP; 16	NSH; 5	BRI; 2	CHI; 14	IOW; 6	GTW; 6	NHA; 4	LVS; 2	MAR; 9	TAL; 10	TEX; 2	PHO; 8	HOM; 2			2nd	3772	
2010	Matt Crafton	88	Chevy	DAY; 5	ATL; 27	MAR; 7	NSH; 6	KAN; 25	DOV; 7	CLT; 11	TEX; 18	MCH; 27	IOW; 3	GTY; 5	IRP; 3	POC; 3	NSH; 7	DAR; 6	BRI; 31	CHI; 7	KEN; 10	NHA; 4	LVS; 5	MAR; 10	TAL; 4	TEX; 3	PHO; 4	HOM; 10			4th	3547	
2011	Matt Crafton	88	Chevy	DAY; 10	PHO; 7	DAR; 4	MAR; 11	NSH; 6	DOV; 3	CLT; 26	KAN; 18	TEX; 29	KEN; 32	IOW; 1	NSH; 11	IRP; 6	POC; 8	MCH; 21	BRI; 21	ATL; 7	CHI; 7	NHA; 6	KEN; 23	LVS; 2	TAL; 31	MAR; 12	TEX; 5	HOM; 19			8th	785	
2012	Matt Crafton	88	Toyota	DAY; 23	MAR; 24	CAR; 3	KAN; 12	CLT; 15	DOV; 8	TEX; 2	KEN; 4	IOW; 3	CHI; 4	POC; 4	MCH; 16	BRI; 9	ATL; 9	IOW; 9	KEN; 9	LVS; 2	TAL; 18	MAR; 4	TEX; 6	PHO; 20	HOM; 12						6th	759	
2013	Matt Crafton	88	Toyota	DAY; 9	MAR; 2	CAR; 6	KAN; 1	CLT; 4	DOV; 2	TEX; 4	KEN; 10	IOW; 6	ELD; 8	POC; 8	MCH; 9	BRI; 10	MSP; 10	IOW; 7	CHI; 4	LVS; 11	TAL; 9	MAR; 17	TEX; 10	PHO; 5	HOM; 21						1st	804	
2014	Matt Crafton	88	Toyota	DAY; 13	MAR; 1	KAN; 2	CLT; 2	DOV; 23	TEX; 1*	GTW; 26	KEN; 6	IOW; 3	ELD; 9	POC; 14	MCH; 2	BRI; 4	MSP; 6	CHI; 2	NHA; 3	LVS; 3	TAL; 14	MAR; 3	TEX; 5	PHO; 2	HOM; 9						1st	833	
2015	Matt Crafton	88	Toyota	DAY; 8	ATL; 1*	MAR; 2	KAN; 1	CLT; 3	DOV; 5	TEX; 1*	GTW; 21	IOW; 4	KEN; 1	ELD; 9	POC; 28	MCH; 6	BRI; 7	MSP; 2	CHI; 14	NHA; 2	LVS; 8*	TAL; 24*	MAR; 1	TEX; 4	PHO; 23	HOM; 1*					3rd	877	
2016	Matt Crafton	88	Toyota	DAY; 10	ATL; 30*	MAR; 7	KAN; 2*	DOV; 1	CLT; 1*	TEX; 2*	IOW; 8	GTW; 27	KEN; 8	ELD; 10	POC; 12	BRI; 32	MCH; 7	MSP; 4	CHI; 27	NHA; 3	LVS; 8	TAL; 22	MAR; 17	TEX; 2	PHO; 3	HOM; 7					2nd	4026	
2017	Matt Crafton	88	Toyota	DAY; 14	ATL; 2	MAR; 9	KAN; 16	CLT; 6	DOV; 11	TEX; 9	GTW; 4	IOW; 19	KEN; 8	ELD; 1	POC; 6	MCH; 6	BRI; 2	MSP; 25	CHI; 16	NHA; 6	LVS; 7	TAL; 9	MAR; 2*	TEX; 9	PHO; 21	HOM; 6					4th	4031	
2018	Matt Crafton	88	Ford	DAY; 19	ATL; 5	LVS; 29	MAR; 15	DOV; 2	KAN; 6	CLT; 11	TEX; 5	IOW; 26	GTW; 20	CHI; 11	KEN; 3	ELD; 4	POC; 9	MCH; 10*	BRI; 8	MSP; 5	LVS; 5	TAL; 26	MAR; 13	TEX; 9	PHO; 11	HOM; 6					6th	2280	
2019	Matt Crafton	88	Ford	DAY; 5	ATL; 14	LVS; 3	MAR; 8	TEX; 5	DOV; 5	KAN; 6	CLT; 5	TEX; 2	IOW; 7	GTW; 9	CHI; 8	KEN; 13	POC; 6	ELD; 10	MCH; 10	BRI; 7	MSP; 11	LVS; 30	TAL; 8	MAR; 23	PHO; 6	HOM; 2					1st	4035	
2020	Matt Crafton	88	Ford	DAY; 15	LVS; 4	CLT; 35	ATL; 12	HOM; 9	POC; 40	KEN; 3	TEX; 3	KAN; 4	KAN; 1	MCH; 23	DAY; 4	DOV; 2	GTW; 14	DAR; 14	RCH; 2	BRI; 10	LVS; 9	TAL; 8	KAN; 8	TEX; 6	MAR; 5	PHO; 14					5th	2274	
2021	Matt Crafton	88	Toyota	DAY; 15	DAY; 6	LVS; 5	ATL; 8	BRI; 14	RCH; 18	KAN; 24	DAR; 4	COA; 15	CLT; 30	TEX; 20	NSH; 6	POC; 6	KNX; 6	GLN; 22	GTW; 2	DAR; 10	BRI; 7	LVS; 3	TAL; 14	MAR; 5	PHO; 12						4th	4025	
2022	Matt Crafton	88	Toyota	DAY; 27	LVS; 7	ATL; 25	COA; 13	MAR; 7	BRI; 9	DAR; 5	KAN; 9	TEX; 9	CLT; 18	GTW; 13	SON; 34	KNX; 7	NSH; 10	MOH; 18	POC; 15	IRP; 9	RCH; 7	KAN; 15	BRI; 5	TAL; 22	HOM; 8	PHO; 12					9th	2208	
2023	Matt Crafton	88	Ford	DAY; 9	LVS; 11	ATL; 9	COA; 33	TEX; 13	BRD; 4	MAR; 26	KAN; 11	DAR; 12	NWS; 7	CLT; 12	GTW; 25	NSH; 15	MOH; 6	POC; 14	RCH; 7	IRP; 9	MLW; 5	KAN; 33	BRI; 16	TAL; 24	HOM; 7	PHO; 11					11th	614	
2024	Matt Crafton	88	Ford	DAY; 7	ATL; 13	LVS; 7	BRI; 4	COA; 23	MAR; 12	TEX; 15	KAN; 10	DAR; 31	NWS; 20	CLT; 31	GTW; 20	NSH; 23	POC; 8	IRP; 24	RCH; 15	MLW; 10	BRI; 6	KAN; 25	TAL; 23	HOM; 11	MAR; 13	PHO; 19					14th	506	
2025	Matt Crafton	88	Ford	DAY; 27	ATL; 22	LVS; 9	HOM; 13	MAR; 28	BRI; 16	CAR; 24	TEX; 7	KAN; 13	NWS; 18	CLT; 20	NSH; 25	MCH; 6	POC; 27	LRP; 19	IRP; 18	GLN; 13	RCH; 26	DAR; 21	BRI; 10	NHA; 26	ROV; 24	TAL; 7	MAR; 29	PHO; 13			20th	494	
2026	Ty Majeski	88	Ford	DAY; 4	ATL; 28	STP; 2	DAR; 31	ROC; 8	BRI; 23	TEX; 9	GLN; 24	DOV; 2	CLT; 33	NSH; 12	MCH; 35	COR; 5	LRP; 32	NWS; 10	IRP; 3	RCH; 19	NHA; 11	BRI; 9	KAN; 29	CLT; 11	PHO; 4	TAL; 4	MAR; 4	HOM; 4			4th	2299	

^{*} Season still in progress
^{1} Ineligible for series points

=== Truck No. 89 history ===
Part-time (2017)

In 2017, this truck competed in the Eldora Dirt Derby, driven by Rico Abreu.

==== Truck No. 89 results ====
Year	Driver	No.	Make	1	2	3	4	5	6	7	8	9	10	11	12	13	14	15	16	17	18	19	20	21	22	23	NCWTC	Pts
2017	Rico Abreu	89	Toyota	DAY	ATL	MAR	KAN	CLT	DOV	TEX	GTW	IOW	KEN	ELD; 26	POC	MCH	BRI	MSP	CHI	NHA	LVS	TAL	MAR	TEX	PHO	HOM		

=== Truck No. 98 history ===
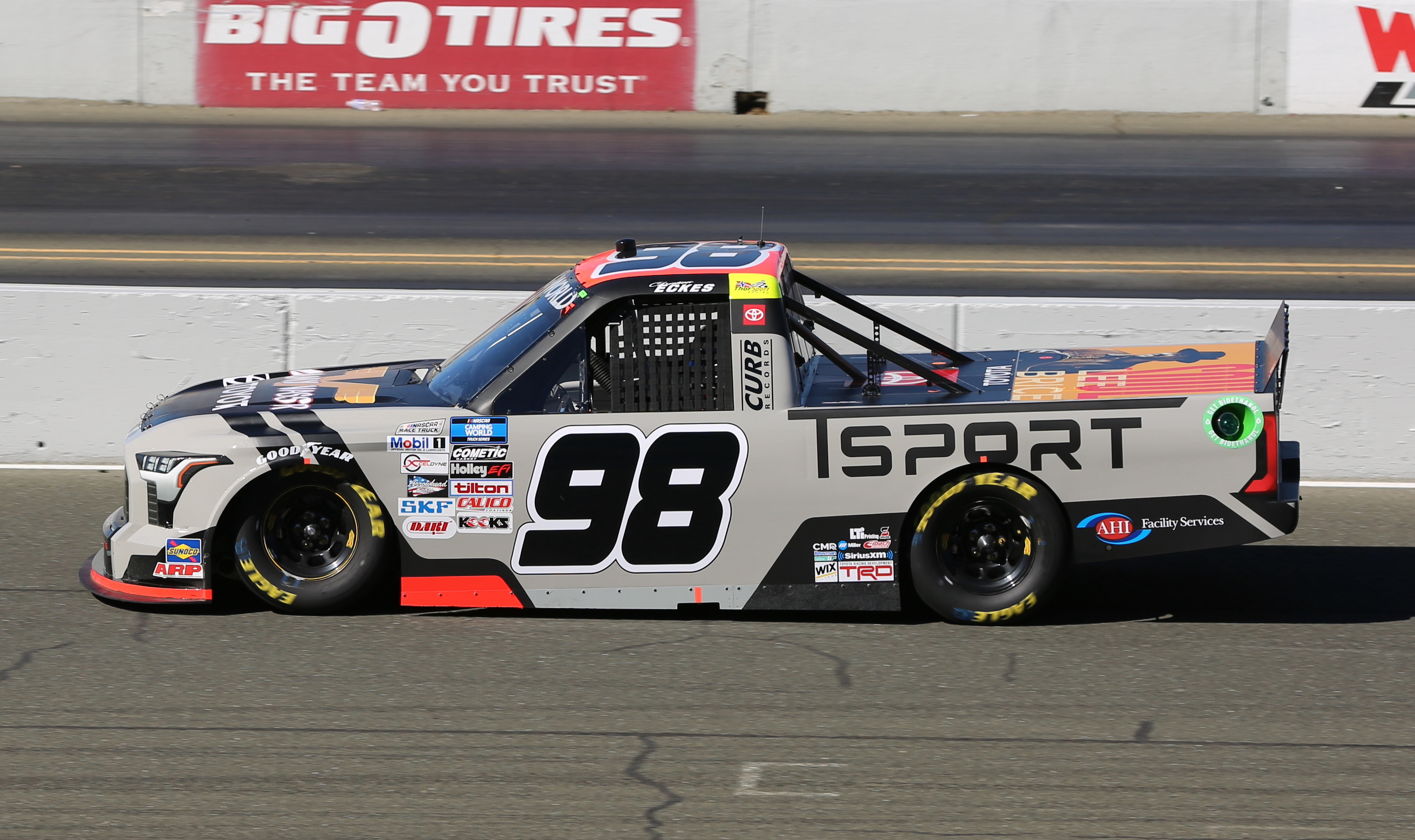
Christian Eckes in the No. 98 at Sonoma Raceway in 2022

==== Part-time (2002–2003, 2009–2012) ====
ThorSport Racing first fielded the No. 98 truck at the 2002 Chevy Silverado 150 with Cory Kruseman driving and Agromin as the sponsor. Kruseman finished 31st due to engine failure. The truck returned a year later at the season-ending Ford 200, driven by Matt Crafton and sponsored by Enzyme Magic. It served as a sister truck to Crafton's usual No. 88 and finished fifteenth.

The No. 98 truck remained dormant for six years before reappearing at the 2009 Heluva Good! 200 at New Hampshire, with Michael McDowell behind the wheel, finishing fourteenth with sponsorship from Perkins Police. Later that season, the truck raced at Texas Motor Speedway with David Gilliland driving but finished 35th after rear-end problems early in the race.

In 2010, the No. 98 truck competed at Daytona with Landon Cassill and EasytoInstall.com as the sponsor but was involved in an early crash. The team returned in 2011 with Penske development driver Dakoda Armstrong, supported by sponsorship from Ferrellgas and Argisure for seven races. Armstrong moved to ThorSport Racing in 2012 to contend for Rookie of the Year. However, the team's sponsorship from EverFi only lasted for the first fourteen races, leading to Armstrong's release before the Iowa fall race and the subsequent closure of the team.

==== Johnny Sauter (2013–2015) ====
The No. 98 team returned in 2013 with Johnny Sauter swapping to the number. The season started strong, with back-to-back wins at Daytona and Martinsville. However, the team faced a setback when crew chief Joe Shear Jr. was suspended by NASCAR due to a fuel cell violation. Although Shear returned for the race at Iowa, he resigned from ThorSport after the Eldora event, citing disagreements about the team's Ohio-based operation instead of North Carolina.

Despite these challenges, Sauter secured his third win of the season at Talladega, completing a sweep of the restrictor plate events in the Truck Series. He finished fourth in the final points standings.

Sauter remained with the No. 98 team in 2014, achieving one victory at Michigan. He was a championship contender for much of the season but ultimately finished fourth in points, matching his 2013 result. Sauter continued with the team in 2015 but announced late in the season that he would leave for GMS Racing in 2016.

Rico Abreu (2016)

In 2016, Rico Abreu replaced Sauter. During the season, Abreu recorded two top-five finishes, five top-ten finishes, and ended the year thirteenth in the standings.

==== Grant Enfinger (2017–2020) ====
After the 2016 season, Abreu lost his ride due to a lack of sponsorship and was replaced by Grant Enfinger for 2017. Enfinger struggled in his first season, missing the playoffs and finishing eleventh in points. However, 2018 marked a turnaround for Enfinger, as he had a strong regular season, qualified for the playoffs, and won the Las Vegas fall race to advance to the Round of 6. Although he missed the Championship 4, he finished the season 5th in points.

In 2020, the No. 98 team was penalized ten owner and driver points on February 21 after an illegal engine oil reservoir tank was discovered during the pre-race inspection for the Las Vegas race. Later that year, on September 10, Enfinger won at Richmond Raceway, with teammates Ben Rhodes and Matt Crafton finishing second and third. This marked the first 1-2-3 finish in NASCAR Truck Series history.

==== Grant Enfinger and Christian Eckes (2021) ====
In 2021, it was announced that Enfinger and Christian Eckes would share driving duties for the No. 98 truck. Enfinger competed in the races not scheduled with CR7 Motorsports, while Eckes drove the remaining events. Eckes notably secured a victory at the Las Vegas night race.

==== Christian Eckes (2022) ====
In 2022, Eckes drove the truck full-time, consistently running at the front in numerous races and making the playoffs despite not securing a win. However, he narrowly missed advancing to the Championship 4, falling seven points short of teammate Ben Rhodes at the Round of 8 cutoff in Homestead–Miami. Following the 2022 season, Eckes left the team to join McAnally–Hilgemann Racing. The No. 98 team was subsequently renumbered to No. 13 for the 2023 season.

==== Ty Majeski (2023–2025) ====
During the 2023 off-season, ThorSport Racing quietly changed the number of Ty Majeski's team from No. 66 to No. 98 to align with the team's numbering pattern (13, 88, 98, 99). Majeski began the season with a solid sixth-place finish at Daytona and maintained consistency throughout the year, earning seven top-five and eleven top-ten finishes, which secured his spot in the playoffs. Majeski opened the playoffs with a victory in the first round at Indianapolis. However, on August 29, NASCAR suspended his crew chief, Joe Shear Jr., for four races and fined him $25,000 after an illegal right rear wheel and tire were found during pre-race inspection at Milwaukee. The No. 98 team was also penalized 75 owner and driver points, along with five playoff points. Despite these setbacks, Majeski advanced to the Round of 8 before being eliminated at Homestead.

In 2024, Majeski began the season with a fifteenth place finish at Daytona. During the regular season, he secured victories at Indianapolis and Richmond. Although he didn't win any playoff races, his consistency earned him a spot in the Championship 4. Majeski clinched his first Truck Series championship by winning at Phoenix, finishing as the highest-placed Championship 4 driver. He will be moving to the No. 88 following the 2025 season.

==== Jake Garcia (2026) ====
On January 14, 2026, the announced that Jake Garcia would move over to the No. 98. After failing to make the chase, Garcia got his first career win at Bristol night race.

==== Truck No. 98 results ====
Year	Driver	No.	Make	1	2	3	4	5	6	7	8	9	10	11	12	13	14	15	16	17	18	19	20	21	22	23	24	25	Owners	Pts
2002	Cory Kruseman	98	Chevy	DAY	DAR	MAR	GTY	PPR	DOV	TEX	MEM	MLW	KAN	KEN	NHA	MCH	IRP	NSH	RCH	TEX	SBO	LVS	CAL	PHO; 31	HOM; DNQ				96th	70
2003	Cory Kruseman	98	Chevy	DAY	DAR	MMR	MAR	CLT	DOV	TEX	MEM	MLW	KAN	KEN	GTW	MCH	IRP	NSH	BRI	RCH	NHA	CAL	LVS	SBO	TEX	MAR	PHO	HOM; DNQ	n/a	0
2009	Michael McDowell	98	Chevy	DAY	CAL	ATL	MAR	KAN	CLT	DOV	TEX	MCH	MLW	MEM	KEN	IRP	NSH	BRI	CHI	IOW	GTW	NHA; 14	LVS	MAR	TAL	TEX	PHO		75th	58
2009	David Gilliland	98	Chevy																									HOM; 35	75th	58
2010	Landon Cassill	98	Chevy	DAY; 36	ATL	MAR	NSH	KAN	DOV	CLT	TEX	MCH	IOW	GTY	IRP	POC	NSH	DAR	BRI	CHI	KEN	NHA	LVS	MAR	TAL	TEX	PHO	HOM	69th	55
2011	Dakoda Armstrong	98	Chevy	DAY	PHO	DAR	MAR	NSH	DOV	CLT	KAN	TEX	KEN	IOW; 21	NSH	IRP; 21	POC	MCH; 24	BRI	ATL	CHI; 20	NHA	KEN; 9	LVS	TAL; 17	MAR	TEX	HOM; 25	33rd	188
2012	Dakoda Armstrong	98	Toyota	DAY; 35	MAR; 21	CAR; 14	KAN; 15	CLT; 13	DOV; 20	TEX; 18	KEN; 13	IOW; 27	CHI; 16	POC; 12	MCH; 3	BRI; 30	ATL; 23	IOW	KEN										25th	386
2012	Travis Pastrana	98	Toyota																	LVS; 15	TAL	MAR	TEX	PHO	HOM				25th	386
2013	Johnny Sauter	98	Toyota	DAY; 1	MAR; 1	CAR; 4	KAN; 5	CLT; 28	DOV; 7	TEX; 7	KEN; 12	IOW; 11	ELD; 29	POC; 19	MCH; 20	BRI; 4	MSP; 28	IOW; 4	CHI; 10	LVS; 2	TAL; 1	MAR; 8	TEX; 2	PHO; 8	HOM; 16				6th	732
2014	Johnny Sauter	98	Toyota	DAY; 3	MAR; 4	KAN; 21	CLT; 6	DOV; 3	TEX; 7	GTW; 4	KEN; 9	IOW; 18	ELD; 8	POC; 2	MCH; 1	BRI; 5	MSP; 8	CHI; 14	NHA; 4	LVS; 14	TAL; 31	MAR; 7	TEX; 16	PHO; 9	HOM; 10				5th	773
2015	Johnny Sauter	98	Toyota	DAY; 10	ATL; 6	MAR; 4	KAN; 3	CLT; 15	DOV; 9	TEX; 4	GTW; 3	IOW; 17	KEN; 12	ELD; 22	POC; 6	MCH; 4	BRI; 9	MSP; 6	CHI; 5*	NHA; 3	LVS; 12	TAL; 7	MAR; 9	TEX; 13	PHO; 25	HOM; 7			4th	809
2016	Rico Abreu	98	Toyota	DAY; 29	ATL; 11	MAR; 10	KAN; 22	DOV; 22	CLT; 20	TEX; 9	IOW; 18	GTW; 14	KEN; 15	ELD; 3	POC; 6	BRI; 26	MCH; 13	MSP; 27	CHI; 19	NHA; 17	LVS; 20	TAL; 4	MAR; 24	TEX; 12	PHO; 11	HOM; 13			16th	395
2017	Grant Enfinger	98	Toyota	DAY; 16	ATL; 8	MAR; 16	KAN; 11	CLT; 7	DOV; 3	TEX; 3	GTW; 5	IOW; 4	KEN; 28	ELD; 4	POC; 13	MCH; 8	BRI; 4	MSP; 13	CHI; 5	NHA; 4	LVS; 9	TAL; 4	MAR; 12	TEX; 7	PHO; 24	HOM; 8			13th	718
2018	Grant Enfinger	98	Ford	DAY; 6	ATL; 9	LVS; 4	MAR; 4	DOV; 14	KAN; 8	CLT; 12	TEX; 4	IOW; 11	GTW; 21	CHI; 8	KEN; 6	ELD; 2	POC; 6	MCH; 7	BRI; 10	MSP; 17	LVS; 1*	TAL; 19*	MAR; 14	TEX; 12	PHO; 4	HOM; 2			5th	2266
2019	Grant Enfinger	98	Ford	DAY; 2	ATL; 3	LVS; 11	MAR; 7	TEX; 4	DOV; 4	KAN; 7	CLT; 9	TEX; 4*	IOW; 4	GTW; 6	CHI; 16	KEN; 24	POC; 10	ELD; 3	MCH; 7	BRI; 5	MSP; 13	LVS; 31	TAL; 10	MAR; 4	PHO; 5	HOM; 7			7th	2236
2020	Grant Enfinger	98	Ford	DAY; 1*	LVS; 31	CLT; 12	ATL; 1	HOM; 17	POC; 11	KEN; 12	TEX; 8	KAN; 3	KAN; 3	MCH; 33*	DRC; 7	DOV; 13	GTW; 8	DAR; 4	RCH; 1	BRI; 6	LVS; 6	TAL; 13	KAN; 4	TEX; 32	MAR; 1	PHO; 13			4th	4024
2021	Grant Enfinger	98	Toyota	DAY; 11			ATL; 11	BRD; 6	RCH; 8		DAR; 5			TEX; 3	NSH; 3		KNX; 3			DAR; 6	BRI; 2		TAL; 21	MAR; 21					9th	2201
2021	Christian Eckes	98	Toyota		DRC; 10	LVS; 9				KAN; 4		COA; 35	CLT; 11			POC; 12		GLN; 13	GTW; 31			LVS; 1			PHO; 6				9th	2201
2022	Christian Eckes	98	Toyota	DAY; 3	LVS; 28	ATL; 16	COA; 6	MAR; 12	BRD; 5	DAR; 17	KAN; 5	TEX; 2	CLT; 4	GTW; 2	SON; 35	KNX; 12	NSH; 6	MOH; 5	POC; 8	IRP; 16	RCH; 8	KAN; 10	BRI; 8	TAL; 5*	HOM; 7	PHO; 30			9th	2230
2023	Ty Majeski	98	Ford	DAY; 6	LVS; 5	ATL; 11	COA; 3	TEX; 4	BRD; 2	MAR; 4	KAN; 25	DAR; 31	NWS; 2	CLT; 7	GTW; 30	NSH; 31	MOH; 7	POC; 6	RCH; 2*	IRP; 1*	MLW; 7	KAN; 18	BRI; 19	TAL; 21	HOM; 9	PHO; 14*			8th	2185
2024	Ty Majeski	98	Ford	DAY; 15	ATL; 2	LVS; 10*	BRI; 34	COA; 3	MAR; 2	TEX; 10	KAN; 33	DAR; 5	NWS; 11	CLT; 23	GTW; 4	NSH; 9	POC; 31	IRP; 1	RCH; 1	MLW; 2	BRI; 8	KAN; 15	TAL; 12	HOM; 2	MAR; 11	PHO; 1*			1st	4040
2025	Ty Majeski	98	Ford	DAY; 3	ATL; 8	LVS; 4	HOM; 11	MAR; 13	BRI; 33	CAR; 31	TEX; 10	KAN; 14	NWS; 6	CLT; 32	NSH; 8	MCH; 15	POC; 9	LRP; 2	IRP; 5	GLN; 7	RCH; 2	DAR; 4	BRI; 4	NHA; 5	ROV; 8	TAL; 3	MAR; 7	PHO; 2	2nd	4035
2026	Jake Garcia	98	Ford	DAY; 32	ATL; 7	STP; 18	DAR; 23	ROC; 9	BRI; 6	TEX; 29	GLN; 11	DOV; 9	CLT; 13	NSH; 32	MCH; 9	COR; 32	LRP; 22	NWS; 13	IRP; 21	RCH; 6	NHA; 14	BRI; 1	KAN; 9	CLT; 29	PHO; 5	TAL; 26	MAR; 13	HOM; 8	15th	614

=== Truck No. 99 history ===
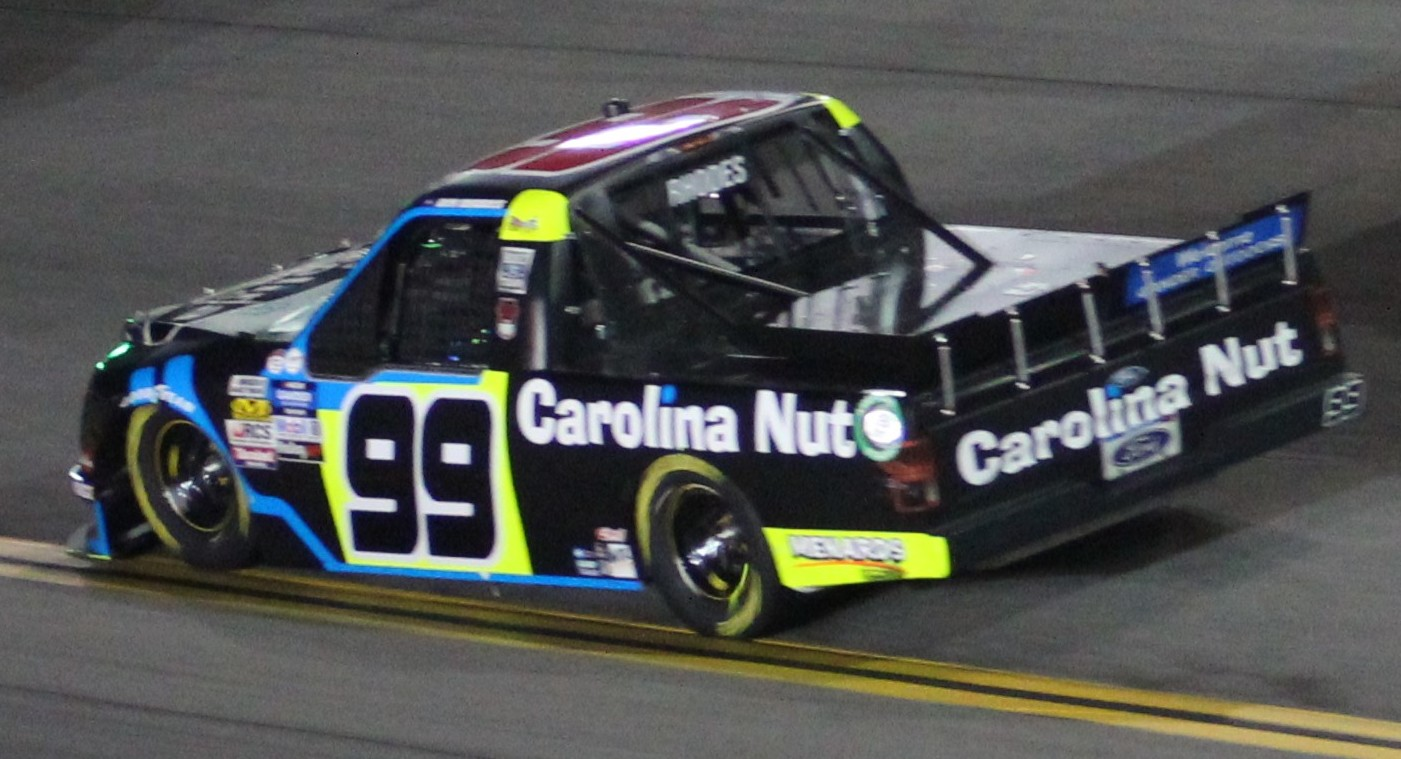
Ben Rhodes in the No. 99 at Daytona International Speedway in 2019

In 2019, the team fielded the No. 99 truck for Ben Rhodes, who went on to win the Truck Series' return to Darlington in 2020.

In 2021, Rhodes won the first two races of the season at Daytona and the Daytona Road Course, ultimately securing the Truck Series championship.

In 2022, Rhodes finished second at Daytona and then encountered a DNF, placing 31st at Las Vegas. He rebounded with three consecutive top-five finishes before securing a win at the Bristol dirt race. Rhodes also finished second at Phoenix and ended the season in second place in the standings.

In 2023, Rhodes began the season with an eleventh place finish at Daytona. He earned his first win of the season at Charlotte and finished second at Homestead, securing a spot in the Championship 4. At Phoenix, Rhodes finished fifth, but as the highest-finishing driver among the Championship 4, he clinched his second Truck Series championship.

In 2024, Rhodes was winless but managed to earn enough points to qualify for the playoffs. However, he was eliminated in the Round of 10 at Kansas.

==== Truck No. 99 results ====
Year	Driver	No.	Make	1	2	3	4	5	6	7	8	9	10	11	12	13	14	15	16	17	18	19	20	21	22	23	24	25	NCTC	Pts	Ref
2019	Ben Rhodes	99	Ford	DAY; 14	ATL; 5	LVS; 25	MAR; 2	TEX; 10	DOV; 6	KAN; 2	CLT; 4	TEX; 21	IOW; 2	GTW; 8	CHI; 32	KEN; 19	POC; 9	ELD; 14	MCH; 23	BRI; 8	MSP; 3	LVS; 8	TAL; 12	MAR; 16	PHO; 4*	HOM; 12			9th	773	
2020	Ben Rhodes	99	Ford	DAY; 25	LVS; 5	CLT; 10	ATL; 9	HOM; 18	POC; 5	KEN; 2	TEX; 9	KAN; 7	KAN; 5	MCH; 11	DAY; 14	DOV; 5	GTW; 11	DAR; 1	RCH; 3*	BRI; 13	LVS; 23	TAL; 4	KAN; 20	TEX; 20	MAR; 2	PHO; 7			7th	2240	
2021	Ben Rhodes	99	Toyota	DAY; 1	DAY; 1	LVS; 10	ATL; 16	BRI; 2	RCH; 7	KAN; 10	DAR; 2	COA; 10	CLT; 3	TEX; 26	NSH; 7	POC; 17	KNX; 7	GLN; 15	GTW; 3	DAR; 34	BRI; 9	LVS; 2	TAL; 13	MAR; 7	PHO; 3				1st	4034	
2022	Ben Rhodes	99	Toyota	DAY; 2	LVS; 31	ATL; 2	COA; 4	MAR; 5	BRI; 1	DAR; 25	KAN; 10	TEX; 27	CLT; 10	GTW; 8	SON; 18	KNX; 10	NSH; 12	MOH; 23	POC; 19	IRP; 2	RCH; 18	KAN; 13	BRI; 18	TAL; 2	HOM; 6	PHO; 2			2nd	4035	
2023	Ben Rhodes	99	Ford	DAY; 11	LVS; 3	ATL; 5	COA; 10	TEX; 10	BRD; 19	MAR; 6	KAN; 16	DAR; 18	NWS; 33	CLT; 1	GTW; 7	NSH; 9	MOH; 5	POC; 9	RCH; 12	IRP; 16	MLW; 16	KAN; 25	BRI; 7	TAL; 2	HOM; 2	PHO; 5			1st	4032	
2024	Ben Rhodes	99	Ford	DAY; 30	ATL; 28	LVS; 13	BRI; 16	COA; 7	MAR; 14	TEX; 24	KAN; 16	DAR; 3	NWS; 22	CLT; 5	GTW; 7	NSH; 7	POC; 18	IRP; 21	RCH; 7	MLW; 9	BRI; 27	KAN; 22	TAL; 35	HOM; 12	MAR; 2	PHO; 9			10th	2121	
2025	Ben Rhodes	99	Ford	DAY; 20	ATL; 7	LVS; 14	HOM; 33	MAR; 5	BRI; 5	CAR; 32	TEX; 6	KAN; 11	NWS; 23	CLT; 17	NSH; 14	MCH; 4	POC; 18	LRP; 4	IRP; 11	GLN; 26	RCH; 8	DAR; 11	BRI; 2	NHA; 24	ROV; 36	TAL; 16	MAR; 14	PHO; 29	15th	632	
2026	Ben Rhodes	99	Ford	DAY; 12	ATL; 4*	STP; 3	DAR; 36	ROC; 18	BRI; 11	TEX; 5	GLN; 32	DOV; 19	CLT; 4	NSH; 28	MCH; 21	COR; 8	LRP; 31	NWS; 14	IRP; 15	RCH; 18	NHA; 18	BRI; 11	KAN; 5	CLT; 21	PHO; 21	TAL; 17	MAR; 2	HOM; 13	12th	652	

^{*} Season still in progress

== ARCA Racing Series ==
=== Car No. 13 history ===
In 2014, Jeb Burton made his debut with ThorSport Racing after being released from Turner Scott Motorsports due to sponsorship issues. He drove the No. 13 Toyota Camry in the ARCA Racing Series season opener at Daytona, starting 21st and finishing 29th after being involved in an early crash.

==== Car No. 13 results ====
Year	Driver	No.	Make	1	2	3	4	5	6	7	8	9	10	11	12	13	14	15	16	17	18	19	20	ARSC	Pts
2014	Jeb Burton	13	Toyota	DAY; 29	MOB	SLM	TAL	TOL	NJE	POC	MCH	ELK	WIN	CHI	IRP	POC	BLN	ISF	MAD	DSF	SLM	KEN	KAN		

=== Car No. 44 history ===
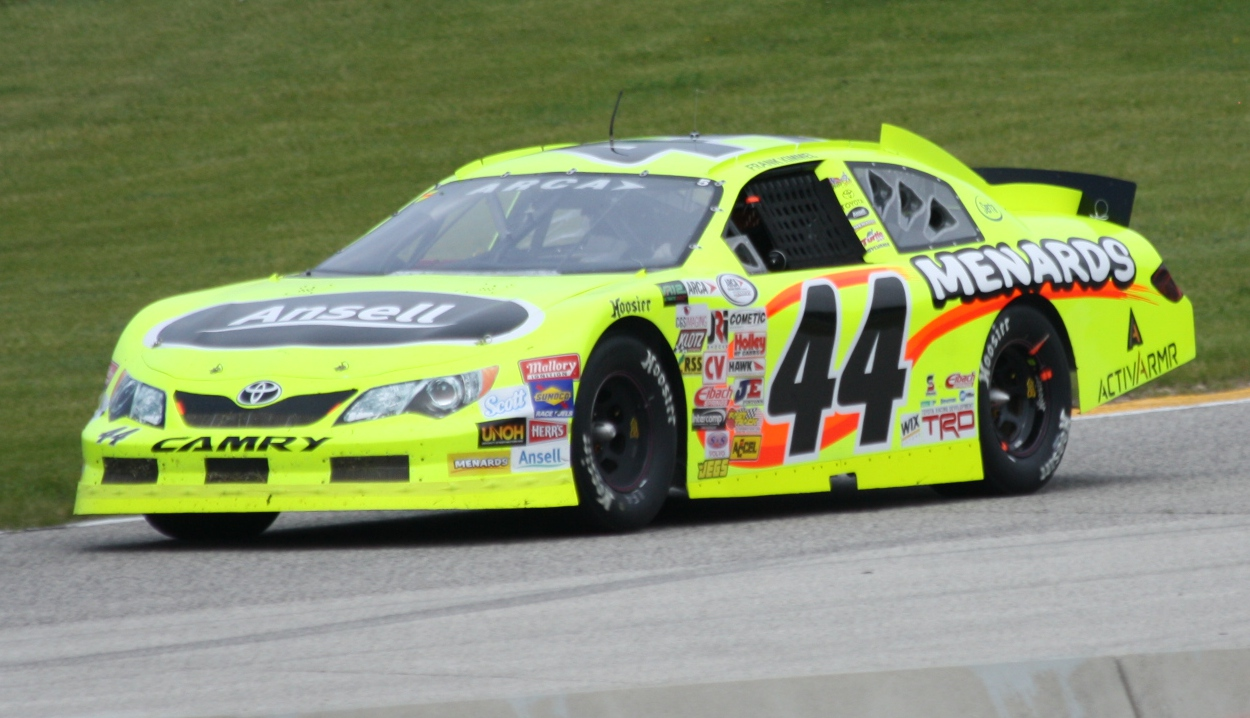
Kimmel's 2013 No. 44 ARCA championship car at Road America

In 2012, nine-time ARCA Racing Series champion Frank Kimmel joined the team, driving the No. 44 Toyota Camry. In 2013, Kimmel became the all-time wins leader in ARCA history with 80 victories, culminating in his tenth championship. However, the team shut down after Kimmel departed for Win-Tron Racing following his championship-winning season.

==== Car No. 44 results ====
Year	Driver	No.	Make	1	2	3	4	5	6	7	8	9	10	11	12	13	14	15	16	17	18	19	20	21	ARSC	Pts
2012	Frank Kimmel	44	Toyota	DAY; 23	MOB; 17	SLM; 2	TAL; 7	TOL; 2	ELK; 4	POC; 6	MCH; 7	WIN; 11	NJE; 7	IOW; 5	CHI; 3	IRP; 1	POC; 4	BLN; 2	ISF; 1	MAD; 9	SLM; 4	DSF; C	KAN; 6		2nd	4810
2013	Frank Kimmel	44	Toyota	DAY; 4	MOB; 5	SLM; 6	TAL; 1	TOL; 3	ELK; 1	POC; 3	MCH; 3	ROA; 7	WIN; 1	CHI; 9	NJE; 5	POC; 2	BLN; 3	ISF; 4	MAD; 3	DSF; 7	IOW; 10	SLM; 3	KEN; 9	KAN; 1	1st	5735

=== Car No. 88 history ===
ThorSport fielded the No. 88 Toyota Camry for Matt Crafton in 2012 at Lucas Oil Raceway, where he started on the pole but finished 31st after being involved in a crash. Prior to this, Crafton had competed in several races for Kimmel Racing in the No. 88 car.

==== Car No. 88 results ====
Year	Driver	No.	Make	1	2	3	4	5	6	7	8	9	10	11	12	13	14	15	16	17	18	19	20	ARSC	Pts
2012	Matt Crafton	88	Toyota	DAY	MOB	SLM	TAL	TOL	ELK	POC	MCH	WIN	NJE	IOW	CHI	IRP; 31	POC	BLN	ISF	MAD	SLM	DSF	KAN		

== See also ==
- Baker Curb Racing
- Curb Agajanian Performance Group
