= 2025 Team EJP 175 =

21st race of the 2025 NASCAR Craftsman Truck Series

Race details
- Race 21 of 25 of the 2025 NASCAR Craftsman Truck Series
- Date: September 20, 2025
- Location: New Hampshire Motor Speedway in Loudon, New Hampshire
- Course: Permanent racing facility
- Course length: 1.058 miles (2.426 km)
- Distance: 175 laps, 175 mi (185 km)
- Scheduled distance: 175 laps, 175 mi (185 km)
- Average speed: 88.027 mph (141.666 km/h)

Pole position
Driver	Corey Heim	Tricon Garage
- Time: 28.946

Most laps led
Driver	Corey Heim	Tricon Garage
- Laps: 124

Winner
No. 11	Corey Heim	Tricon Garage

Television in the United States
- Network: FS1
- Announcers: Jamie Little, Regan Smith, and Michael Waltrip

Radio in the United States
- Radio: NRN

The 2025 Team EJP 175 was the 21st stock car race of the 2025 NASCAR Craftsman Truck Series, the third and final race of the Round of 10, and the 1st iteration of the event. The race was held on Saturday, September 20, 2025, at New Hampshire Motor Speedway in Loudon, New Hampshire, a 1.058 miles (1.703 km) permanent oval-shaped speedway. The race took the scheduled 175 laps to complete.

In a wreck-filled race, Corey Heim, driving for Tricon Garage, would continue one of the dominating seasons in series history, winning both stages and led a race-high 124 laps from the pole position to earn his 20th career NASCAR Craftsman Truck Series win, and his record-tying ninth of the season, matching with Greg Biffle in the 1999 season. To fill out the podium, Chandler Smith and Layne Riggs, both driving for Front Row Motorsports, would finish 2nd and 3rd, respectively.

Following the race, Smith and Jake Garcia were eliminated from playoff contention. Heim, Riggs, Daniel Hemric, Ty Majeski, Tyler Ankrum, Grant Enfinger, Rajah Caruth, and Kaden Honeycutt would advance into the Round of 8.

== Report ==
=== Background ===
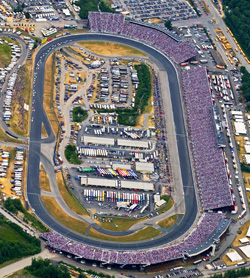
New Hampshire Motor Speedway, the track where the race was held.

New Hampshire Motor Speedway is a 1.058-mile (1.703 km) oval speedway located in Loudon, New Hampshire, which has hosted NASCAR racing annually since the early 1990s, as well as the longest-running motorcycle race in North America, the Loudon Classic. Nicknamed "The Magic Mile", the speedway is often converted into a 1.6-mile (2.6 km) road course, which includes much of the oval.

The track was originally the site of Bryar Motorsports Park before being purchased and redeveloped by Bob Bahre. The track is currently one of eight major NASCAR tracks owned and operated by Speedway Motorsports.

=== Entry list ===
- (R) denotes rookie driver.
- (i) denotes driver who is ineligible for series driver points.
- (P) denotes playoff driver.
- (OP) denotes owner's playoff truck.

#	Driver	Team	Make
1	Brent Crews	Tricon Garage	Toyota
02	Jayson Alexander	Young's Motorsports	Chevrolet
2	Stephen Mallozzi	Reaume Brothers Racing	Ford
5	Toni Breidinger (R)	Tricon Garage	Toyota
6	Norm Benning	Norm Benning Racing	Chevrolet
7	Patrick Emerling (OP)	Spire Motorsports	Chevrolet
9	Grant Enfinger (P)	CR7 Motorsports	Chevrolet
11	Corey Heim (P)	Tricon Garage	Toyota
13	Jake Garcia (P)	ThorSport Racing	Ford
15	Tanner Gray	Tricon Garage	Toyota
16	Christian Eckes (i)	McAnally-Hilgemann Racing	Chevrolet
17	Gio Ruggiero (R)	Tricon Garage	Toyota
18	Tyler Ankrum (P)	McAnally-Hilgemann Racing	Chevrolet
19	Daniel Hemric (P)	McAnally-Hilgemann Racing	Chevrolet
20	Mason Massey (i)	Young's Motorsports	Chevrolet
22	Blake Lothian	Reaume Brothers Racing	Ford
26	Dawson Sutton (R)	Rackley W.A.R.	Chevrolet
33	Tyler Tomassi (i)	Reaume Brothers Racing	Ford
34	Layne Riggs (P)	Front Row Motorsports	Ford
38	Chandler Smith (P)	Front Row Motorsports	Ford
41	Conner Jones	Niece Motorsports	Chevrolet
42	Matt Mills	Niece Motorsports	Chevrolet
44	Andrés Pérez de Lara (R)	Niece Motorsports	Chevrolet
45	Bayley Currey	Niece Motorsports	Chevrolet
52	Kaden Honeycutt (P)	Halmar Friesen Racing	Toyota
62	Mike Christopher Jr.	Halmar Friesen Racing	Toyota
69	Derek White	MBM Motorsports	Ford
71	Rajah Caruth (P)	Spire Motorsports	Chevrolet
74	Caleb Costner	Mike Harmon Racing	Toyota
76	Spencer Boyd	Freedom Racing Enterprises	Chevrolet
77	Corey LaJoie	Spire Motorsports	Chevrolet
81	Connor Mosack (R)	McAnally-Hilgemann Racing	Chevrolet
88	Matt Crafton	ThorSport Racing	Ford
91	Jack Wood	McAnally-Hilgemann Racing	Chevrolet
98	Ty Majeski (P)	ThorSport Racing	Ford
99	Ben Rhodes	ThorSport Racing	Ford
Official entry list

== Practice ==
The first and only practice session was held on Friday, September 19, at 4:05 PM EST, and would last for 50 minutes. Corey Heim, driving for Tricon Garage, would set the fastest time in the session, with a lap of 29.799, and a speed of 127.816 mph (205.700 km/h).

Pos.	#	Driver	Team	Make	Time	Speed
1	11	Corey Heim (P)	Tricon Garage	Toyota	29.799	127.816
2	52	Kaden Honeycutt (P)	Halmar Friesen Racing	Toyota	29.885	127.449
3	38	Chandler Smith (P)	Front Row Motorsports	Ford	29.886	127.444
Full practice results

== Qualifying ==
Qualifying was held on Friday, September 19, at 5:10 PM EST. Since New Hampshire Motor Speedway is a mile oval, the qualifying procedure used is a single-car, one-lap system with one round. Drivers will be on track by themselves and will have one lap to post a qualifying time, and whoever sets the fastest time will win the pole.

Corey Heim, driving for Tricon Garage, would score the pole for the race, with a lap of 28.946, and a speed of 131.583 mph (211.762 km/h).

No drivers would fail to qualify.

=== Qualifying results ===
Pos.	#	Driver	Team	Make	Time	Speed
1	11	Corey Heim (P)	Tricon Garage	Toyota	28.946	131.583
2	38	Chandler Smith (P)	Front Row Motorsports	Ford	29.003	131.324
3	98	Ty Majeski (P)	ThorSport Racing	Ford	29.031	131.198
4	34	Layne Riggs (P)	Front Row Motorsports	Ford	29.062	131.058
5	15	Tanner Gray	Tricon Garage	Toyota	29.257	130.184
6	88	Matt Crafton	ThorSport Racing	Ford	29.260	130.171
7	1	Brent Crews	Tricon Garage	Toyota	29.279	130.086
8	77	Corey LaJoie	Spire Motorsports	Chevrolet	29.334	129.843
9	13	Jake Garcia (P)	ThorSport Racing	Ford	29.354	129.754
10	18	Tyler Ankrum (P)	McAnally-Hilgemann Racing	Chevrolet	29.376	129.657
11	81	Connor Mosack (R)	McAnally-Hilgemann Racing	Chevrolet	29.381	129.635
12	71	Rajah Caruth (P)	Spire Motorsports	Chevrolet	29.395	129.573
13	19	Daniel Hemric (P)	McAnally-Hilgemann Racing	Chevrolet	29.429	129.423
14	17	Gio Ruggiero (R)	Tricon Garage	Toyota	29.464	129.270
15	52	Kaden Honeycutt (P)	Halmar Friesen Racing	Toyota	29.505	129.090
16	9	Grant Enfinger (P)	CR7 Motorsports	Chevrolet	29.520	129.024
17	99	Ben Rhodes	ThorSport Racing	Ford	29.584	128.745
18	41	Conner Jones	Niece Motorsports	Chevrolet	29.647	128.472
19	91	Jack Wood	McAnally-Hilgemann Racing	Chevrolet	29.706	128.217
20	44	Andrés Pérez de Lara (R)	Niece Motorsports	Chevrolet	29.707	128.212
21	26	Dawson Sutton (R)	Rackley W.A.R.	Chevrolet	29.723	128.143
22	7	Patrick Emerling (OP)	Spire Motorsports	Chevrolet	29.724	128.139
23	45	Bayley Currey	Niece Motorsports	Chevrolet	29.766	127.958
24	42	Matt Mills	Niece Motorsports	Chevrolet	29.886	127.444
25	5	Toni Breidinger (R)	Tricon Garage	Toyota	30.346	125.512
26	20	Mason Massey (i)	Young's Motorsports	Chevrolet	30.748	123.958
27	76	Spencer Boyd	Freedom Racing Enterprises	Chevrolet	30.800	123.662
28	16	Christian Eckes (i)	McAnally-Hilgemann Racing	Chevrolet	30.858	123.430
29	62	Mike Christopher Jr.	Halmar Friesen Racing	Toyota	30.863	123.410
30	22	Blake Lothian	Reaume Brothers Racing	Ford	30.959	123.027
31	02	Jayson Alexander	Young's Motorsports	Chevrolet	31.225	121.979
Qualified by owner's points
32	6	Norm Benning	Norm Benning Racing	Chevrolet	33.443	113.889
33	2	Stephen Mallozzi	Reaume Brothers Racing	Ford	34.200	111.368
34	69	Derek White	MBM Motorsports	Ford	–	–
35	74	Caleb Costner	Mike Harmon Racing	Toyota	–	–
36	33	Tyler Tomassi (i)	Reaume Brothers Racing	Ford	–	–
Official qualifying results
Official starting lineup

== Race results ==
Stage 1 Laps: 55

Pos.	#	Driver	Team	Make	Pts
1	11	Corey Heim (P)	Tricon Garage	Toyota	10
2	38	Chandler Smith (P)	Front Row Motorsports	Ford	9
3	98	Ty Majeski (P)	ThorSport Racing	Ford	8
4	71	Rajah Caruth (P)	Spire Motorsports	Chevrolet	7
5	13	Jake Garcia (P)	ThorSport Racing	Ford	6
6	52	Kaden Honeycutt (P)	Halmar Friesen Racing	Toyota	5
7	44	Andrés Pérez de Lara (R)	Niece Motorsports	Chevrolet	4
8	1	Brent Crews	Tricon Garage	Toyota	3
9	26	Dawson Sutton (R)	Rackley W.A.R.	Chevrolet	2
10	18	Tyler Ankrum (P)	McAnally-Hilgemann Racing	Chevrolet	1

Stage 2 Laps: 55

Pos.	#	Driver	Team	Make	Pts
1	11	Corey Heim (P)	Tricon Garage	Toyota	10
2	44	Andrés Pérez de Lara (R)	Niece Motorsports	Chevrolet	9
3	38	Chandler Smith (P)	Front Row Motorsports	Ford	8
4	34	Layne Riggs (P)	Front Row Motorsports	Ford	7
5	17	Gio Ruggiero (R)	Tricon Garage	Toyota	6
6	77	Corey LaJoie	Spire Motorsports	Chevrolet	5
7	71	Rajah Caruth (P)	Spire Motorsports	Chevrolet	4
8	19	Daniel Hemric (P)	McAnally-Hilgemann Racing	Chevrolet	3
9	52	Kaden Honeycutt (P)	Halmar Friesen Racing	Toyota	2
10	9	Grant Enfinger (P)	CR7 Motorsports	Chevrolet	1

Stage 3 Laps: 65

Fin	St	#	Driver	Team	Make	Laps	Led	Status	Pts
1	1	11	Corey Heim (P)	Tricon Garage	Toyota	175	124	Running	61
2	2	38	Chandler Smith (P)	Front Row Motorsports	Ford	175	0	Running	52
3	4	34	Layne Riggs (P)	Front Row Motorsports	Ford	175	0	Running	41
4	14	17	Gio Ruggiero (R)	Tricon Garage	Toyota	175	0	Running	39
5	3	98	Ty Majeski (P)	ThorSport Racing	Ford	175	0	Running	40
6	16	9	Grant Enfinger (P)	CR7 Motorsports	Chevrolet	175	0	Running	32
7	15	52	Kaden Honeycutt (P)	Halmar Friesen Racing	Toyota	175	0	Running	37
8	8	77	Corey LaJoie	Spire Motorsports	Chevrolet	175	0	Running	34
9	28	16	Christian Eckes (i)	McAnally-Hilgemann Racing	Chevrolet	175	0	Running	0
10	12	71	Rajah Caruth (P)	Spire Motorsports	Chevrolet	175	4	Running	38
11	10	18	Tyler Ankrum (P)	McAnally-Hilgemann Racing	Chevrolet	175	0	Running	27
12	13	19	Daniel Hemric (P)	McAnally-Hilgemann Racing	Chevrolet	175	0	Running	28
13	29	62	Mike Christopher Jr.	Halmar Friesen Racing	Toyota	175	0	Running	24
14	21	26	Dawson Sutton (R)	Rackley W.A.R.	Chevrolet	175	0	Running	25
15	20	44	Andrés Pérez de Lara (R)	Niece Motorsports	Chevrolet	175	47	Running	35
16	9	13	Jake Garcia (P)	ThorSport Racing	Ford	175	0	Running	27
17	7	1	Brent Crews	Tricon Garage	Toyota	175	0	Running	23
18	23	45	Bayley Currey	Niece Motorsports	Chevrolet	174	0	Running	19
19	26	20	Mason Massey (i)	Young's Motorsports	Chevrolet	174	0	Running	0
20	30	22	Blake Lothian	Reaume Brothers Racing	Ford	174	0	Running	17
21	27	76	Spencer Boyd	Freedom Racing Enterprises	Chevrolet	174	0	Running	16
22	19	91	Jack Wood	McAnally-Hilgemann Racing	Chevrolet	173	0	Running	15
23	24	42	Matt Mills	Niece Motorsports	Chevrolet	170	0	Running	14
24	17	99	Ben Rhodes	ThorSport Racing	Ford	133	0	Accident	13
25	25	5	Toni Breidinger (R)	Tricon Garage	Toyota	132	0	Accident	12
26	6	88	Matt Crafton	ThorSport Racing	Ford	132	0	Accident	11
27	34	33	Tyler Tomassi (i)	Reaume Brothers Racing	Ford	126	0	Accident	0
28	22	7	Patrick Emerling (OP)	Spire Motorsports	Chevrolet	100	0	Accident	9
29	5	15	Tanner Gray	Tricon Garage	Toyota	61	0	Accident	8
30	35	69	Derek White	MBM Motorsports	Ford	45	0	Accident	7
31	18	41	Conner Jones	Niece Motorsports	Chevrolet	41	0	Accident	6
32	31	02	Jayson Alexander	Young's Motorsports	Chevrolet	31	0	Accident	5
33	36	74	Caleb Costner	Mike Harmon Racing	Toyota	30	0	Accident	4
34	32	6	Norm Benning	Norm Benning Racing	Chevrolet	29	0	Too Slow	3
35	33	2	Stephen Mallozzi	Reaume Brothers Racing	Ford	7	0	Suspension	2
36	11	81	Connor Mosack (R)	McAnally-Hilgemann Racing	Chevrolet	1	0	Accident	1
Official race results

== Standings after the race ==
Drivers' Championship standings

	Pos	Driver	Points
	1	Corey Heim	3,079
	2	Layne Riggs	3,032 (–47)
	3	Daniel Hemric	3,011 (–68)
	4	Ty Majeski	3,010 (–69)
1	5	Tyler Ankrum	3,010 (–69)
1	6	Grant Enfinger	3,007 (–72)
1	7	Rajah Caruth	3,005 (–74)
1	8	Kaden Honeycutt	3,003 (–76)
1	9	Chandler Smith	2,086 (–993)
1	10	Jake Garcia	2,071 (–1,008)
Official driver's standings

Manufacturers' Championship standings

Pos	Manufacturer	Points
1	Toyota	765
2	Chevrolet	747 (–18)
3	Ford	733 (–32)

- Note: Only the first 10 positions are included for the driver standings.

Previous race: 2025 UNOH 250	NASCAR Craftsman Truck Series; 2025 season	Next race: 2025 Ecosave 250
