= Mike Christopher (racing driver) =

American racing driver

- Nationality: American
- Born: June 5, 1958 (age 68) Plainville, Connecticut, U.S.

NASCAR Whelen Modified Tour career
- Debut season: 1994
- Years active: 1994–2002, 2004–2007, 2009–2010, 2012
- Championships: 6
- Poles: 0
- Best finish: 9th in 2005
- Statistics up to date as of October 3, 2024.

Michael Christopher (born June 5, 1958) is an American former professional stock car racing driver who competed in the NASCAR Whelen Modified Tour from 1994 to 2012. He is the twin brother of the late Ted Christopher, who was a former champion of the series, and the father of Mike Christopher Jr., who has also competed in the series.

While Christopher never won a Modified Tour race, he came close on several occasions. In 2000, he crossed the line first in a race at the Waterford Speedbowl driving for Bear Motorsports, but was disqualified in post race technical inspection for an illegal carburator. In 2004, he finished a close second to his brother at New Hampshire Motor Speedway, narrowly missing out on the victory.

Christopher has also previously competed in series such as the now ARCA Menards Series East, the World of Outlaws Late Model Series, and the World Series of Asphalt Stock Car Racing. He is a 3 time track champion in the SK Modified division at Stafford Motor Speedway.

== Motorsports results ==
=== NASCAR ===
(key) (Bold – Pole position awarded by qualifying time. Italics – Pole position earned by points standings or practice time. * – Most laps led.)

==== Whelen Modified Tour ====
NASCAR Whelen Modified Tour results
Year	Team	No.	Make	1	2	3	4	5	6	7	8	9	10	11	12	13	14	15	16	17	18	19	20	21	22	23	NWMTC	Pts	Ref
1994	Mystic Motorsports	82	Chevy	NHA	STA; 28	TMP	NZH	STA; 19	LEE	TMP; 19	RIV	TIO	NHA	RPS	HOL	TMP	RIV	NHA; 26	STA; 26	SPE	TMP; 30	NHA; 39	STA; 19	TMP; 18			33rd	847	
1995	Mystic Motorsports	82	Chevy	TMP	NHA; 7	STA; 18	NZH	STA	LEE	TMP	RIV	BEE	NHA	JEN	RPS	HOL	RIV										36th	559	
1995	N/A	30	Chevy															NHA; 13	STA; 30	TMP	NHA	STA	TMP				36th	559	
1995	Mario Fiore	44	Pontiac																					TMP; 32			36th	559	
1996	N/A	88	Chevy	TMP	STA	NZH	STA	NHA	JEN	RIV	LEE	RPS	HOL	TMP	RIV	NHA	GLN	STA	NHA	NHA	STA; 32	FLE	TMP; 31				N/A	0	
1997	Bear Motorsports	14	Chevy	TMP	MAR	STA	NZH	STA	NHA	FLE	JEN	RIV	GLN	NHA; 31	RPS	HOL	TMP	RIV	NHA	GLN	STA						N/A	0	
1997	Curt Chase	77	Chevy																			NHA; 37	STA	FLE	TMP	RCH	N/A	0	
1998	N/A	1	Chevy	RPS	TMP	MAR	STA	NZH	STA	GLN	JEN	RIV	NHA	NHA	LEE	HOL	TMP	NHA	RIV	STA	NHA	TMP	STA; 7	TMP	FLE		N/A	0	
1999	Bear Motorsports	14	Chevy	TMP	RPS	STA	RCH	STA; 31	RIV	JEN	NHA; 33	NZH	HOL	TMP	NHA	RIV											N/A	0	
1999	Joe Brady	00	Chevy														GLN; 6	STA	RPS	TMP	NHA; 15	STA	MAR	TMP			N/A	0	
2000	Bear Motorsports	11	Chevy	STA; 30	RCH; 3	STA; 16	RIV; 13	SEE; 29	NHA; 2	NZH; 19	TMP; 30	RIV; 28	GLN; 28	TMP; DNQ	STA; DNQ	WFD; 30	NHA; 31										19th	1525	
2000	Bear Motorsports	00	Chevy															STA; 34	MAR; 8	TMP; 35							19th	1525	
2001	Bear Motorsports	50	Chevy	SBO	TMP	STA	WFD	NZH	STA	RIV	SEE	RCH; 25	NHA; 36	HOL	RIV	CHE	TMP	STA	WFD	TMP	STA; DNQ	MAR	TMP; 7				49th	350	
2002	N/A	48	Chevy	TMP	STA	WFD	NZH	RIV	SEE	RCH	STA	BEE	NHA; 14	RIV; DNQ	TMP; 28	STA; 29	WFD										53rd	380	
2002	N/A	18	Chevy															TMP; DNQ	NHA	STA	MAR	TMP					53rd	380	
2004	N/A	82	Chevy	TMP; 37	STA; DNQ	WFD; 29	NZH	STA; DNQ	RIV	LER	WAL	BEE	NHA; 2	SEE	RIV	STA; DNQ	TMP	WFD	TMP	NHA; 29	STA; DNQ	TMP; 11					42nd	685	
2005	Hill Enterprises	79	Pontiac	TMP; 24	STA; 11	RIV; 13	WFD; 11	STA; 17	JEN; 15	NHA; 9	BEE; 8	SEE; 15	RIV; 7	STA; 16	TMP; 4	WFD; 16	MAR; 8	TMP; 31	NHA; 27	STA; 18	TMP; 4						9th	2202	
2006	William Calicchio	14	Chevy	TMP; 14	STA; 25	JEN	TMP	STA	NHA	HOL	RIV	STA	TMP	MAR	TMP	NHA	WFD	TMP	STA								49th	209	
2007	N/A	82	Dodge	TMP	STA	WTO	STA	TMP	NHA; 34	TSA	RIV	STA	TMP	MAN	MAR	NHA; 23	TMP	STA; DNQ	TMP; DNQ								46th	262	
2009	James Ksepka	82	Dodge	TMP	STA	STA	NHA	SPE	RIV	STA	BRI	TMP	NHA; 28	MAR	STA	TMP											59th	79	
2010	James Ksepka	82	Dodge	TMP	STA	STA	MAR	NHA; DNQ	LIM	MND	RIV	STA	TMP	BRI	NHA; 31	STA	TMP										48th	122	
2012	James Ksepka	82	Dodge	TMP	STA	MND	STA	WFD	NHA; 32	STA	TMP	BRI	TMP	RIV	NHA; 20	STA	TMP										39th	36	
