= Mike Christopher Jr. =

American racing driver (born 1999)

- Born: Michael Christopher Jr. April 6, 1999 (age 27); Wolcott, Connecticut, U.S.

NASCAR FedEx Freight Truck Series career
- 4 races run over 2 years
- 2026 position: 40th
- Best finish: 40th (2026)
- First race: 2025 Team EJP 175 (New Hampshire)
- Last race: 2026 Team EJP 175 (New Hampshire)
Wins	Top tens	Poles
0	1	0

ARCA Menards Series career
- 1 race run over 1 year
- Best finish: 91st (2026)
- First race: 2026 Menards 150 (Kansas)
Wins	Top tens	Poles
0	1	0

NASCAR Whelen Modified Tour career
- Debut season: 2021
- Current team: Elite Racing
- Years active: 2021–2022, 2025–present
- Car number: 31
- Crew chief: Eugene Orlando
- Starts: 25
- Championships: 0
- Wins: 1
- Poles: 0
- Best finish: 9th in 2026
- Finished last season: 9th (2026)
- Statistics up to date as of November 6, 2026.

Michael Christopher Jr. (born April 6, 1999) is an American professional stock car racing driver. He last competed full-time in the NASCAR Whelen Modified Tour, driving the No. 31 for Elite Racing, part-time in the NASCAR Craftsman Truck Series, driving the No. 62/72 Toyota Tundra TRD Pro for Halmar Friesen Racing and part-time in the ARCA Menards Series, driving the No. 42 Toyota Camry for Cook Racing Technologies.

== Career ==
=== Early career ===
Christopher started his career in Legends car racing at the Waterford Speedbowl and the Stafford Motor Speedway mini mile, claiming 27 wins in 2014 alone on the way to finishing third in the national Legends car points. In late 2014, Christopher made his debut in a full-size race car, running five races in the SK Lite division at Stafford. For 2015, Christopher moved up to the track's premier SK Modified division, where he has run weekly since, claiming double-digit victories. In addition to running at Stafford, Christopher has also raced in the SK Modified division at Thompson Speedway Motorsports Park and the Waterford Speedbowl. Christopher has previously competed in series such as the Modified Racing Series, the Tri-Track Open Modified Series, the Race of Champions Asphalt Modified Tour, the Indoor Auto Racing Championship, and the World Series of Asphalt Stock Car Racing.

=== ARCA Menards Series ===
On September 16, 2026, it was announced that Christopher will make his ARCA Menards Series, driving the No. 42 for Cook Racing Technologies.

=== NASCAR Craftsman Truck Series ===
On August 29, 2025, it was revealed that Christopher would make his NASCAR Craftsman Truck Series debut at New Hampshire Motor Speedway, driving for Halmar Friesen Racing. Christopher overcame a mid-race restart violation to finish thirteenth place.

Before the 2026 season, Christopher competed in Kaulig Racing's "Race For the Seat", competing against 14 other drivers to try to win a full-season ride in the team's No. 14 truck. He remained with HFR and drove the No. 62 at Rockingham and IRP. It was announced on August 15, that he would run at New Hampshire in a third truck for HFR, the No. 72.

== Personal life ==
Christopher is the son of Mike Christopher, who competed in the series from 1994 to 2012, and the nephew of the late Ted Christopher, who was a former champion of the series.

== Motorsports career results ==
=== Stock car career summary ===
Season	Series	Team	Races	Wins	Top 5	Top 10	Points	Position
2021	NASCAR Whelen Modified Tour	Tommy Baldwin Racing	1	0	0	0	30	54th
2022	NASCAR Whelen Modified Tour	Tommy Baldwin Racing	3	1	3	3	162	28th
2022	NASCAR Whelen Modified Tour	Beth Baldwin	1	0	0	0	162	28th
2025	SMART Modified Tour	Curb Racing	1	0	1	1	39	39th
2025	NASCAR Whelen Modified Tour	Curb Racing	3	0	0	1	124	28th
2025	NASCAR Whelen Modified Tour	Mike Christopher	1	0	0	0	124	28th
2025	NASCAR Craftsman Truck Series	Halmar Friesen Racing	1	0	0	0	24	55th
2026	NASCAR Whelen Modified Tour	Elite Racing	15	0	3	7	525	9th
2026	NASCAR Whelen Modified Tour	Mike Christopher	1	0	0	1	525	9th
2026	NASCAR Craftsman Truck Series	Halmar Friesen Racing	3	0	0	1	69	40th

=== NASCAR ===
(key) (Bold – Pole position awarded by qualifying time. Italics – Pole position earned by points standings or practice time. * – Most laps led.)

==== Craftsman Truck Series ====
NASCAR Craftsman Truck Series results
Year	Team	No.	Make	1	2	3	4	5	6	7	8	9	10	11	12	13	14	15	16	17	18	19	20	21	22	23	24	25	NCTC	Pts	Ref
2025	Halmar Friesen Racing	62	Toyota	DAY	ATL	LVS	HOM	MAR	BRI	CAR	TEX	KAN	NWS	CLT	NSH	MCH	POC	LRP	IRP	GLN	RCH	DAR	BRI	NHA; 13	ROV	TAL	MAR	PHO	55th	24	
2026	Halmar Friesen Racing	62	Toyota	DAY	ATL	STP	DAR	CAR; 23	BRI	TEX	GLN	DOV	CLT	NSH	MCH	COR	LRP	NWS	IRP; 10	RCH									40th	69	
2026	Halmar Friesen Racing	72	Toyota																		NHA; 12	BRI	KAN	CLT	PHO	TAL	MAR	HOM	40th	69	

^{*} Season still in progress
^{1} Ineligible for series points

==== Whelen Modified Tour ====
NASCAR Whelen Modified Tour results
Year	Team	No.	Make	1	2	3	4	5	6	7	8	9	10	11	12	13	14	15	16	NWMTC	Pts	Ref
2021	Tommy Baldwin Racing	7	Chevy	MAR	STA	RIV	JEN	OSW	RIV	NHA	NRP	STA	BEE	OSW	RCH	RIV; 14	STA			54th	30	
2022	Tommy Baldwin Racing	7	Chevy	NSM; 3	RCH	RIV	LEE	JEN; 1										TMP; 2	MAR	28th	162	
2022	Beth Baldwin	1	Chevy						MND; 13	RIV	WAL	NHA	CLM	TMP	LGY	OSW	RIV			28th	162	
2025	Mike Curb	77	Chevy	NSM	THO	NWS	SEE	RIV	WMM	LMP; 14	MON	MON	THO	RCH	OSW; 12				MAR; 10	28th	124	
2025	Mike Christopher	13	N/A													NHA; 16	RIV	THO		28th	124	
2026	Elite Racing	31	N/A	NSM; 19	MAR; 15	THO; 3	SEE; 16	RIV; 19	OXF; 12	SEE; 11	CLM; 8	WMM; 6	MON; 21	THO; 12		STA; 8	OSW; 5	RIV; 15	THO; 4	9th	525	
2026	Mike Christopher	13	N/A												NHA; 6					9th	525	

=== ARCA Menards Series ===
(key) (Bold – Pole position awarded by qualifying time. Italics – Pole position earned by points standings or practice time. * – Most laps led.)

ARCA Menards Series results
Year	Team	No.	Make	1	2	3	4	5	6	7	8	9	10	11	12	13	14	15	16	17	18	19	20	AMSC	Pts	Ref
2026	Cook Racing Technologies	42	Toyota	DAY	PHO	KAN	TAL	GLN	TOL	MCH	POC	BER	ELK	CHI	LRP	IRP	IOW	ISF	MAD	DSF	SLM	BRI	KAN; 9	91st	35	

=== SMART Modified Tour ===
SMART Modified Tour results
Year	Car owner	No.	Make	1	2	3	4	5	6	7	8	9	10	11	12	13	14	SMTC	Pts	Ref
2025	Curb Racing	77	N/A	FLO	AND	SBO	ROU; 3	HCY	FCS	CRW	CPS	CAR	CRW	DOM	FCS	TRI	NWS	39th	39	
