= Jason White (Canadian racing driver) =

Canadian racing driver (born 1973)

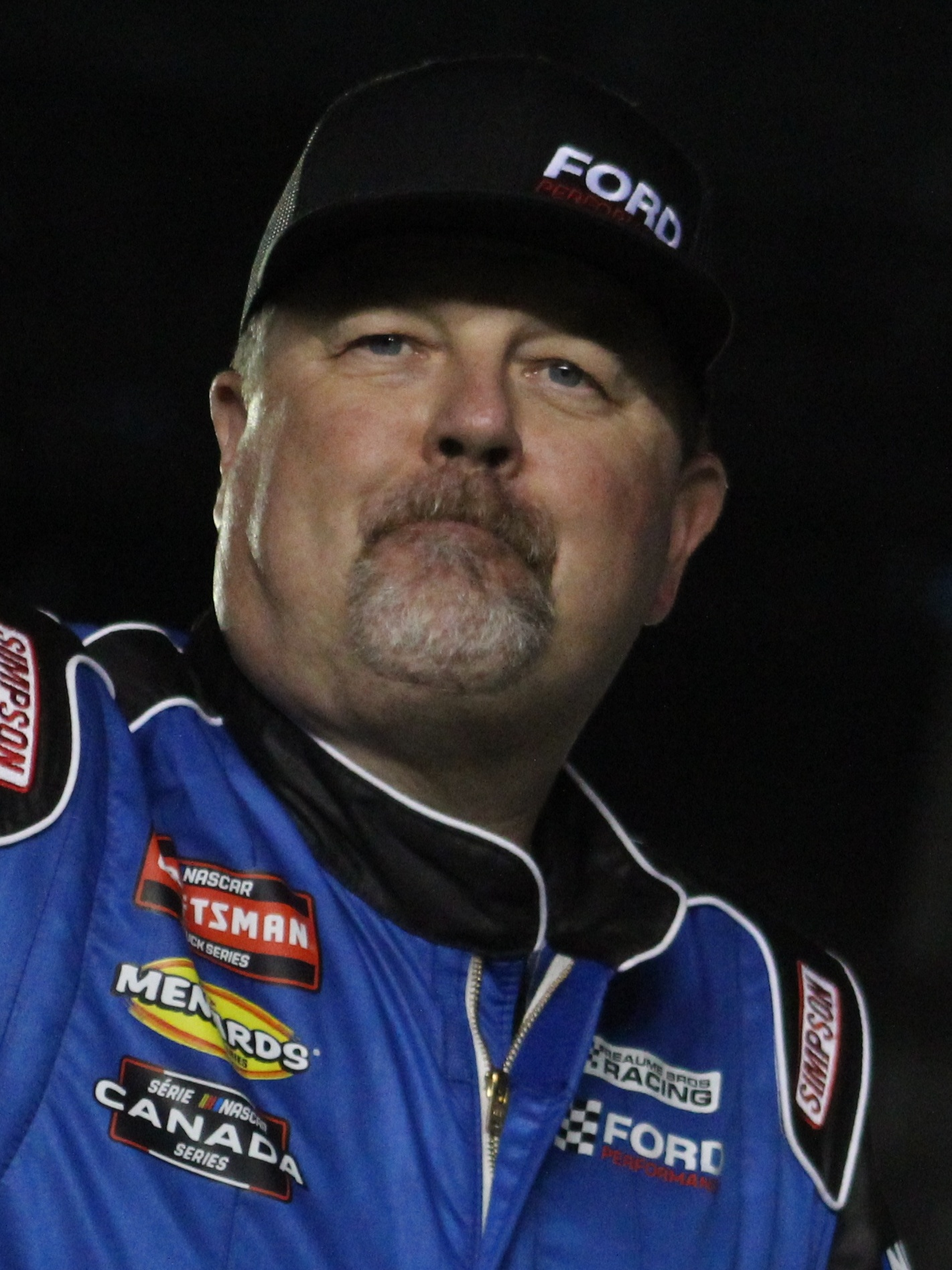
- White at Daytona International Speedway in 2024
- Born: Jason M. White; May 3, 1973 (age 53); Abbotsford, British Columbia, Canada

NASCAR FedEx Freight Truck Series career
- 17 races run over 9 years
- 2026 position: 58th
- Best finish: 42nd (2024)
- First race: 2018 Chevrolet Silverado 250 (Mosport)
- Last race: 2026 Love's RV Stop 225 (Talladega)
Wins	Top tens	Poles
0	2	0

NASCAR Canada Series career
- 105 races run over 14 years
- 2020 position: 13th
- Best finish: 8th (2011, 2013)
- First race: 2007 B.C. Dodge Dealers Dodge Avenger 300 (Vernon)
- Last race: 2020 Pinty's 125 (Jukasa)
Wins	Top tens	Poles
0	22	0

ARCA Menards Series career
- 7 races run over 6 years
- Best finish: 55th (2020)
- First race: 2019 Lucas Oil 200 (Daytona)
- Last race: 2025 Ride the 'Dente 200 (Daytona)
Wins	Top tens	Poles
0	3	0

Mayor of Sun Peaks
- Incumbent
- Assumed office November 3, 2026
- Preceded by: Rob O'Toole
- Statistics up to date as of November 6, 2026.

Jason M. White (born May 3, 1973) is a Canadian professional stock car racing driver and politician. He last competed part-time in the NASCAR Craftsman Truck Series, driving the No. 2 Ford F-150 for Team Reaume.

He has served as the mayor of Sun Peaks, British Columbia, since 2026.

== Racing career ==
=== Early career ===
In the early portions of White's career, he raced super modified, mini-sprint, and street stock cars on the United States and Canadian West Coasts.

=== CASCAR West Series ===
White raced for three years in the series from 2004 to 2006, with a career-best finish of sixth in 2005.

=== Pinty's Series ===
Since 2005, White has been racing in the Pinty's Series every year, driving the No. 21 Powder Ventures Excavating Dodge owned by his wife, Melissa McKenzie. In the 2019 season, he became the first driver from western Canada to reach 100 starts in the series.

=== Craftsman Truck Series ===
White made his Truck Series debut in 2018, driving the No. 33 Chevrolet Silverado for Reaume Brothers Racing. He started 27th and finished 23rd, two laps down. In 2019, White returned to RBR in an attempt to make the Daytona race, but failed to qualify. He made a second attempt at Daytona with RBR in 2020 and collected his first top-ten finish. White would return to RBR for the season-opener at Daytona again in 2021, as well as the following week's race at the Daytona Road Course. In both races, he drove the No. 33 truck. White would race the season-opener at Daytona again in 2022 for RBR with a twentieth place finish. White would fail to qualify at Talladega later that season. White would again return to RBR to drive the No. 34 truck at Daytona in 2023, resulting in a 21st-place finish.

=== ARCA Menards Series ===
In 2019, White made his ARCA debut driving the No. 11 Chevrolet for Fast Track Racing at Daytona, where he finished sixteenth. He improved to a sixth-place showing at Daytona in 2020, also with FTR. He would drive the No. 44 Chevy in 2022 and 2023. He would finish ninth in 2023 after getting passed on the final lap from the lead.

== Political career ==
White's family has operated construction businesses in Sun Peaks, British Columbia, for over 30 years. In 2026, citing concerns with the municipality's infrastructure, he ran for mayor. As the only candidate, he was acclaimed prior to the October 17 election and sworn in on November 3. White was the third mayor in Sun Peaks history after Al Raine and Rob O'Toole.

== Personal life ==
White has three children.

== Motorsports career results ==
=== NASCAR ===
(key) (Bold – Pole position awarded by qualifying time. Italics – Pole position earned by points standings or practice time. * – Most laps led.)

==== Craftsman Truck Series ====
NASCAR Craftsman Truck Series results
Year	Team	No.	Make	1	2	3	4	5	6	7	8	9	10	11	12	13	14	15	16	17	18	19	20	21	22	23	24	25	NCTC	Pts	Ref
2018	Reaume Brothers Racing	33	Chevy	DAY	ATL	LVS	MAR	DOV	KAN	CLT	TEX	IOW	GTW	CHI	KEN	ELD	POC	MCH	BRI	MSP; 23	LVS	TAL	MAR	TEX	PHO; 26	HOM			67th	25	
2019	Reaume Brothers Racing	34	Chevy	DAY; DNQ	ATL	LVS	MAR	TEX	DOV	KAN	CLT	TEX	IOW	GTW	CHI	KEN	POC	ELD	MCH	BRI	MSP; 20	LVS	TAL	MAR	PHO	HOM			77th	17	
2020	Reaume Brothers Racing	33	Chevy	DAY; 10	LVS	CLT	ATL	HOM	POC	KEN	TEX	KAN	KAN	MCH	DRC	DOV	GTW	DAR	RCH	BRI	LVS								47th	39	
2020	Reaume Brothers Racing	00	Chevy																			TAL; 25	KAN	TEX	MAR	PHO			47th	39	
2021	Reaume Brothers Racing	33	Chevy	DAY; 20	DRC; 38	LVS	ATL	BRD	RCH	KAN	DAR	COA	CLT	TEX	NSH	POC	KNX	GLN	GTW	DAR	BRI	LVS	TAL; 27	MAR	PHO				60th	28	
2022	Reaume Brothers Racing	33	Toyota	DAY; 20	LVS	ATL	COA	MAR	BRD	DAR	KAN	TEX	CLT	GTW	SON	KNX	NSH	MOH	POC	IRP	RCH	KAN	BRI	TAL; DNQ	HOM	PHO			58th	17	
2023	Reaume Brothers Racing	34	Toyota	DAY; 21	LVS	ATL	COA	TEX	BRD	MAR	KAN	DAR	NWS	CLT	GTW	NSH	MOH	POC	RCH	IRP	MLW	KAN	BRI						52nd	26	
2023	AM Racing	22	Ford																					TAL; 27	HOM	PHO			52nd	26	
2024	Reaume Brothers Racing	22	Ford	DAY; 12	ATL	LVS	BRI	COA	MAR	TEX	KAN	DAR	NWS	CLT	GTW	NSH	POC	IRP	RCH	MLW	BRI	KAN	TAL; 20	HOM	MAR	PHO			42nd	42	
2025	Reaume Brothers Racing	22	Ford	DAY; 8	ATL	LVS	HOM	MAR	BRI	CAR	TEX	KAN	NWS	CLT	NSH	MCH	POC	LRP	IRP	GLN	RCH	DAR	BRI	NHA	ROV	TAL; 30	MAR	PHO	44th	36	
2026	Team Reaume	2	Ford	DAY; 33	ATL	STP	DAR	CAR	BRI	TEX	GLN	DOV	CLT	NSH	MCH	COR	LRP	NWS	IRP	RCH	NHA	BRI	KAN	CLT	PHO	TAL; 13	MAR	HOM	58th	28	

^{*} Season still in progress
^{1} Ineligible for series points

=== ARCA Menards Series ===
(key) (Bold – Pole position awarded by qualifying time. Italics – Pole position earned by points standings or practice time. * – Most laps led.)

ARCA Menards Series results
Year	Team	No.	Make	1	2	3	4	5	6	7	8	9	10	11	12	13	14	15	16	17	18	19	20	AMSC	Pts	Ref
2019	Fast Track Racing	11	Chevy	DAY; 16	FIF	SLM	TAL	NSH	TOL	CLT	POC	MCH	MAD	GTW	CHI	ELK	IOW	POC	ISF	DSF	SLM	IRP	KAN	69th	150	
2020	Fast Track Racing	12	Chevy	DAY; 6	PHO	TAL	POC	IRP	KEN	IOW	KAN	TOL	TOL	MCH	DRC	GTW	I44	TOL	BRI	WIN	MEM	ISF	KAN	55th	38	
2021	Fast Track Racing	10	Ford	DAY; 14	PHO	TAL	KAN	TOL	CLT	MOH	POC	ELK	BLN	IOW	WIN	GLN	MCH	ISF	MLW	DSF	BRI	SLM	KAN	95th	30	
2022	Fast Track Racing	10	Chevy	DAY; 17	PHO	TAL	KAN	CLT	IOW	BLN	ELK	MOH	POC	IRP	MCH	GLN	ISF	MLW	DSF	KAN	BRI	SLM	TOL	97th	27	
2023	Jeff McClure Racing	44	Chevy	DAY; 9	PHO	TAL; 10	KAN	CLT	BLN	ELK	MOH	IOW	POC	MCH	IRP	GLN	ISF	MLW	DSF	KAN	BRI	SLM	TOL	58th	70	
2025	Fast Track Racing	9	Ford	DAY; 12	PHO	TAL	KAN	CLT	MCH	BLN	ELK	LRP	DOV	IRP	IOW	GLN	ISF	MAD	DSF	BRI	SLM	KAN	TOL	103rd	32	
