= 2023 Love's RV Stop 250 =

21st race of the 2023 NASCAR Craftsman Truck Series

Race details
- Race 21 of 23 of the 2023 NASCAR Craftsman Truck Series
- Date: September 30, 2023
- Official name: 18th Annual Love's RV Stop 250
- Location: Talladega Superspeedway, Lincoln, Alabama
- Course: Permanent racing facility
- Course length: 2.66 miles (4.28 km)
- Distance: 99 laps, 263 mi (423 km)
- Scheduled distance: 94 laps, 250 mi (402 km)

Pole position
Driver	Chase Purdy	Kyle Busch Motorsports
- Time: 53.368

Most laps led
Driver	Nick Sanchez	Rev Racing
- Laps: 25

Winner
No. 34	Brett Moffitt	Front Row Motorsports

Television in the United States
- Network: FS1
- Announcers: Jamie Little, Phil Parsons, and Michael Waltrip

Radio in the United States
- Radio: MRN

The 2023 Love's RV Stop 250 was the 21st stock car race of the 2023 NASCAR Craftsman Truck Series, the second race of the Round of 8, and the 18th iteration of the event. The race was held on Saturday, September 30, 2023, in Lincoln, Alabama at Talladega Superspeedway, a 2.66 miles (4.28 km) permanent tri-oval shaped superspeedway. The race was originally scheduled to be contested over 94 laps, but was extended to 99 laps due to a NASCAR overtime finish. In a wreck-filled race with numerous cautions, Brett Moffitt, driving in a one-off race for Front Row Motorsports, would steal the win after making an aggressive move on Christian Eckes for the lead on the final lap. This was Moffitt's 13th career NASCAR Craftsman Truck Series win, and his first of the season. Moffitt and Nick Sanchez would dominate the majority of the race, leading 22 and 25 laps, respectively. To fill out the podium, Ben Rhodes, driving for ThorSport Racing, and Dean Thompson, driving for Tricon Garage, would finish 2nd and 3rd, respectively.

== Background ==
Talladega Superspeedway, originally known as Alabama International Motor Superspeedway (AIMS), is a motorsports complex located north of Talladega, Alabama. It is located on the former Anniston Air Force Base in the small city of Lincoln. The track is a tri-oval and was constructed in the 1960s by the International Speedway Corporation, a business controlled by the France family. Talladega is most known for its steep banking and the unique location of the start/finish line that's located just past the exit to pit road. The track currently hosts the NASCAR series such as the NASCAR Cup Series, Xfinity Series and the Craftsman Truck Series. Talladega is the longest NASCAR oval with a length of 2.66-mile-long (4.28 km) tri-oval like the Daytona International Speedway, which also is a 2.5-mile-long (4 km) tri-oval.

=== Entry list ===
- (R) denotes rookie driver.
- (i) denotes driver who is ineligible for series driver points.
- (P) denotes playoff driver.

#	Driver	Team	Make
1	David Gilliland	Tricon Garage	Toyota
02	Garrett Smithley (i)	Young's Motorsports	Chevrolet
2	Nick Sanchez (R) (P)	Rev Racing	Chevrolet
04	Cory Roper	Roper Racing	Ford
4	Chase Purdy	Kyle Busch Motorsports	Chevrolet
5	Dean Thompson	Tricon Garage	Toyota
9	Colby Howard	CR7 Motorsports	Chevrolet
10	Jennifer Jo Cobb	Jennifer Jo Cobb Racing	Chevrolet
11	Corey Heim (P)	Tricon Garage	Toyota
12	Spencer Boyd	Young's Motorsports	Chevrolet
13	Hailie Deegan	ThorSport Racing	Ford
15	Tanner Gray	Tricon Garage	Toyota
16	Tyler Ankrum	Hattori Racing Enterprises	Toyota
17	Taylor Gray (R)	Tricon Garage	Toyota
19	Christian Eckes (P)	McAnally-Hilgemann Racing	Chevrolet
20	Greg Van Alst	Young's Motorsports	Chevrolet
22	Jason M. White	AM Racing	Ford
23	Grant Enfinger (P)	GMS Racing	Chevrolet
24	Rajah Caruth (R)	GMS Racing	Chevrolet
25	Chandler Smith (i)	Rackley WAR	Chevrolet
28	Bryan Dauzat	FDNY Racing	Chevrolet
30	Ryan Vargas	On Point Motorsports	Toyota
32	Bret Holmes (R)	Bret Holmes Racing	Chevrolet
33	Keith McGee	Reaume Brothers Racing	Ford
34	Brett Moffitt (i)	Front Row Motorsports	Ford
35	Jake Garcia (R)	McAnally-Hilgemann Racing	Chevrolet
38	Zane Smith (P)	Front Row Motorsports	Ford
41	Bayley Currey	Niece Motorsports	Chevrolet
42	Carson Hocevar (P)	Niece Motorsports	Chevrolet
43	Daniel Dye (R)	GMS Racing	Chevrolet
45	Lawless Alan	Niece Motorsports	Chevrolet
51	Jack Wood	Kyle Busch Motorsports	Chevrolet
52	Stewart Friesen	Halmar Friesen Racing	Toyota
56	Tyler Hill	Hill Motorsports	Toyota
61	Jake Drew	Hattori Racing Enterprises	Toyota
75	Parker Kligerman (i)	Henderson Motorsports	Chevrolet
88	Matt Crafton	ThorSport Racing	Ford
95	Clay Greenfield	GK Racing	Chevrolet
98	Ty Majeski (P)	ThorSport Racing	Ford
99	Ben Rhodes (P)	ThorSport Racing	Ford
Official entry list

== Qualifying ==
Qualifying was held on Saturday, September 30, at 8:30 AM CST. Since Talladega Superspeedway is a superspeedway, the qualifying system used is a single-car, single-lap system with two rounds. In the first round, drivers have one lap to set a time. The fastest ten drivers from the first round move on to the second round. Whoever sets the fastest time in Round 2 wins the pole.

Chase Purdy, driving for Kyle Busch Motorsports, would win the pole after advancing from the preliminary round and setting the fastest time in Round 2, with a lap of 53.368, and an average speed of 179.433 mph (288.769 km/h).

Spencer Boyd, Jennifer Jo Cobb, Keith McGee, and Clay Greenfield failed to qualify.

Pos.	#	Driver	Team	Make	Time (R1)	Speed (R1)	Time (R2)	Speed (R2)
1	4	Chase Purdy	Kyle Busch Motorsports	Chevrolet	53.584	178.710	53.368	179.433
2	2	Nick Sanchez (R) (P)	Rev Racing	Chevrolet	53.740	178.191	53.653	178.480
3	35	Jake Garcia (R)	McAnally-Hilgemann Racing	Chevrolet	54.031	177.232	54.010	177.300
4	5	Dean Thompson	Tricon Garage	Toyota	54.143	176.865	54.049	177.173
5	98	Ty Majeski (P)	ThorSport Racing	Ford	54.098	177.012	54.061	177.133
6	51	Jack Wood	Kyle Busch Motorsports	Chevrolet	53.993	177.356	54.087	177.048
7	42	Carson Hocevar (P)	Niece Motorsports	Chevrolet	53.992	177.360	54.123	176.930
8	99	Ben Rhodes (P)	ThorSport Racing	Ford	54.160	176.809	54.136	176.888
9	11	Corey Heim (P)	Tricon Garage	Toyota	54.139	176.878	54.144	176.862
10	61	Jake Drew	Hattori Racing Enterprises	Toyota	54.174	176.764	54.467	175.813
Eliminated in Round 1
11	1	David Gilliland	Tricon Garage	Toyota	54.217	176.624	—	—
12	88	Matt Crafton	ThorSport Racing	Ford	54.262	176.477	—	—
13	75	Parker Kligerman (i)	Henderson Motorsports	Chevrolet	54.267	176.461	—	—
14	24	Rajah Caruth (R)	GMS Racing	Chevrolet	54.290	176.386	—	—
15	32	Bret Holmes (R)	Bret Holmes Racing	Chevrolet	54.337	176.234	—	—
16	19	Christian Eckes (P)	McAnally-Hilgemann Racing	Chevrolet	54.355	176.175	—	—
17	9	Colby Howard	CR7 Motorsports	Chevrolet	54.368	176.133	—	—
18	38	Zane Smith (P)	Front Row Motorsports	Ford	54.379	176.097	—	—
19	15	Tanner Gray	Tricon Garage	Toyota	54.418	175.971	—	—
20	52	Stewart Friesen	Halmar Friesen Racing	Toyota	54.447	175.877	—	—
21	45	Lawless Alan	Niece Motorsports	Chevrolet	54.449	175.871	—	—
22	16	Tyler Ankrum	Hattori Racing Enterprises	Toyota	54.461	175.832	—	—
23	13	Hailie Deegan	ThorSport Racing	Ford	54.490	175.739	—	—
24	17	Taylor Gray (R)	Tricon Garage	Toyota	54.554	175.532	—	—
25	23	Grant Enfinger (P)	GMS Racing	Chevrolet	54.634	175.275	—	—
26	20	Greg Van Alst	Young's Motorsports	Chevrolet	54.635	175.272	—	—
27	41	Bayley Currey	Niece Motorsports	Chevrolet	54.654	175.211	—	—
28	25	Chandler Smith (i)	Rackley WAR	Chevrolet	54.732	174.962	—	—
29	43	Daniel Dye (R)	GMS Racing	Chevrolet	54.740	174.936	—	—
30	28	Bryan Dauzat	FDNY Racing	Chevrolet	54.803	174.735	—	—
31	34	Brett Moffitt (i)	Front Row Motorsports	Ford	54.863	174.633	—	—
Qualified by owner's points
32	02	Garrett Smithley (i)	Young's Motorsports	Chevrolet	54.863	174.544	—	—
33	30	Ryan Vargas	On Point Motorsports	Toyota	54.877	174.499	—	—
34	56	Tyler Hill	Hill Motorsports	Toyota	54.953	174.258	—	—
35	04	Cory Roper	Roper Racing	Ford	55.575	172.308	—	—
36	22	Jason M. White	AM Racing	Ford	55.743	171.788	—	—
Failed to qualify
37	12	Spencer Boyd	Young's Motorsports	Chevrolet	55.230	173.384	—	—
38	10	Jennifer Jo Cobb	Jennifer Jo Cobb Racing	Chevrolet	55.554	172.373	—	—
39	33	Keith McGee	Reaume Brothers Racing	Ford	55.828	171.527	—	—
40	95	Clay Greenfield	GK Racing	Chevrolet	—	—	—	—
Official qualifying results
Official starting lineup

== Race results ==
Stage 1 Laps: 20

Pos.	#	Driver	Team	Make	Pts
1	2	Nick Sanchez (R) (P)	Rev Racing	Chevrolet	10
2	42	Carson Hocevar (P)	Niece Motorsports	Chevrolet	9
3	11	Corey Heim (P)	Tricon Garage	Toyota	8
4	98	Ty Majeski (P)	ThorSport Racing	Ford	7
5	32	Bret Holmes (R)	Bret Holmes Racing	Chevrolet	6
6	9	Colby Howard	CR7 Motorsports	Chevrolet	5
7	75	Parker Kligerman (i)	Henderson Motorsports	Chevrolet	0
8	15	Tanner Gray	Tricon Garage	Toyota	3
9	1	David Gilliland	Tricon Garage	Toyota	2
10	5	Dean Thompson	Tricon Garage	Toyota	1

Stage 2 Laps: 20

Pos.	#	Driver	Team	Make	Pts
1	75	Parker Kligerman (i)	Henderson Motorsports	Chevrolet	0
2	2	Nick Sanchez (R) (P)	Rev Racing	Chevrolet	9
3	42	Carson Hocevar (P)	Niece Motorsports	Chevrolet	8
4	98	Ty Majeski (P)	ThorSport Racing	Ford	7
5	99	Ben Rhodes (P)	ThorSport Racing	Ford	6
6	15	Tanner Gray	Tricon Garage	Toyota	5
7	17	Taylor Gray (R)	Tricon Garage	Toyota	4
8	32	Bret Holmes (R)	Bret Holmes Racing	Chevrolet	3
9	5	Dean Thompson	Tricon Garage	Toyota	2
10	11	Corey Heim (P)	Tricon Garage	Toyota	1

Stage 3 Laps: 59

Fin	St	#	Driver	Team	Make	Laps	Led	Status	Pts
1	31	34	Brett Moffitt (i)	Front Row Motorsports	Ford	99	22	Running	0
2	8	99	Ben Rhodes (P)	ThorSport Racing	Ford	99	0	Running	41
3	4	5	Dean Thompson	Tricon Garage	Toyota	99	0	Running	37
4	28	25	Chandler Smith (i)	Rackley WAR	Chevrolet	99	0	Running	0
5	9	11	Corey Heim (P)	Tricon Garage	Toyota	99	0	Running	41
6	29	43	Daniel Dye (R)	GMS Racing	Chevrolet	99	0	Running	31
7	2	2	Nick Sanchez (R) (P)	Rev Racing	Chevrolet	99	25	Running	49
8	23	13	Hailie Deegan	ThorSport Racing	Ford	99	0	Running	29
9	13	75	Parker Kligerman (i)	Henderson Motorsports	Chevrolet	99	10	Running	0
10	21	45	Lawless Alan	Niece Motorsports	Chevrolet	99	0	Running	27
11	7	42	Carson Hocevar (P)	Niece Motorsports	Chevrolet	99	5	Running	43
12	14	24	Rajah Caruth (R)	GMS Racing	Chevrolet	99	0	Running	25
13	25	23	Grant Enfinger (P)	GMS Racing	Chevrolet	99	0	Running	24
14	6	51	Jack Wood	Kyle Busch Motorsports	Chevrolet	99	0	Running	23
15	32	02	Garrett Smithley (i)	Young's Motorsports	Chevrolet	99	0	Running	0
16	15	32	Bret Holmes (R)	Bret Holmes Racing	Chevrolet	99	3	Running	30
17	33	30	Ryan Vargas	On Point Motorsports	Toyota	99	0	Running	20
18	24	17	Taylor Gray (R)	Tricon Garage	Toyota	99	1	Running	23
19	16	19	Christian Eckes (P)	McAnally-Hilgemann Racing	Chevrolet	99	8	Running	18
20	10	61	Jake Drew	Hattori Racing Enterprises	Toyota	98	0	Running	17
21	5	98	Ty Majeski (P)	ThorSport Racing	Ford	93	0	Accident	30
22	35	04	Cory Roper	Roper Racing	Ford	93	0	DVP	15
23	17	9	Colby Howard	CR7 Motorsports	Chevrolet	92	0	Accident	19
24	12	88	Matt Crafton	ThorSport Racing	Ford	91	1	Accident	13
25	19	15	Tanner Gray	Tricon Garage	Toyota	91	12	Accident	20
26	26	20	Greg Van Alst	Young's Motorsports	Chevrolet	91	0	Accident	11
27	36	22	Jason M. White	AM Racing	Ford	88	0	Running	10
28	1	4	Chase Purdy	Kyle Busch Motorsports	Chevrolet	84	11	Accident	9
29	3	35	Jake Garcia (R)	McAnally-Hilgemann Racing	Chevrolet	79	0	Running	8
30	34	56	Tyler Hill	Hill Motorsports	Toyota	59	0	Accident	7
31	27	41	Bayley Currey	Niece Motorsports	Chevrolet	58	1	Accident	6
32	18	38	Zane Smith (P)	Front Row Motorsports	Ford	55	0	Running	5
33	22	16	Tyler Ankrum	Hattori Racing Enterprises	Toyota	50	0	Accident	4
34	20	52	Stewart Friesen	Halmar Friesen Racing	Toyota	38	0	Accident	3
35	11	1	David Gilliland	Tricon Garage	Toyota	38	0	Accident	4
36	30	28	Bryan Dauzat	FDNY Racing	Chevrolet	5	0	Handling	1
Official race results

== Post-race conflict ==
After the conclusion of the race, a post-race fight broke out near the garage area, between Rev Racing driver Nick Sanchez and ThorSport Racing driver Matt Crafton. During the late stages of the race, Sanchez would make an aggressive move on Crafton, which would ultimately trigger a 15 truck pileup on the frontstretch. While walking back to his hauler, Sanchez would be tapped on the back by Crafton, for which he would give Sanchez a sucker punch to the face when he turned around. Multiple crew members from McAnally-Hilgemann Racing and GMS Racing would jump in to break up the altercation. While Sanchez was being restrained by fellow driver Cory Roper, blood covering most of his face, he would ultimately yell "I'm going to fucking kill you at Homestead. You fucked with the wrong guy motherfucker. It's on now." On October 3, Crafton was fined $25,000 and Sanchez was fined $5,000 for their involvement in the fight. In addition, Sanchez's father, Rene, was suspended for the remainder of the season for his involvement in the altercation.

== Standings after the race ==
Drivers' Championship standings

	Pos	Driver	Points
	1	Corey Heim	3,121
1	2	Carson Hocevar	3,111 (-10)
1	3	Christian Eckes	3,097 (-24)
3	4	Nick Sanchez	3,091 (-30)
1	5	Grant Enfinger	3,088 (-33)
	6	Ben Rhodes	3,086 (-35)
1	7	Ty Majeski	3,072 (-49)
3	8	Zane Smith	3,055 (-66)
1	9	Matt Crafton	2,103 (-1,018)
1	10	Matt DiBenedetto	2,102 (-1,019)
Official driver's standings

- Note: Only the first 10 positions are included for the driver standings.

Previous race: 2023 UNOH 200	NASCAR Craftsman Truck Series; 2023 season	Next race: 2023 Baptist Health Cancer Care 200
