= Rackley W.A.R. =

American stock car racing team

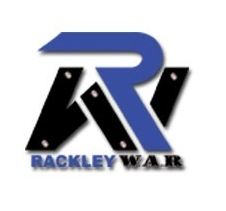
- Owner(s): Curtis Sutton; Willie Allen
- Base: Statesville, North Carolina
- Series: Super Late Models; Pro Late Models
- Race drivers: CARS Tour: 10. Graham Doyle; 25. Rodney Dowless Jr.; 27. Vito Cancilla; 62. Keelan Harvick, Dawson Sutton; CARS Tour West: 25. William Sawalich; 27. Vito Cancilla; 29. Kevin Harvick; 62. Keelan Harvick; ASA Stars Late Model Series: 25. William Sawalich, Kevin Harvick; 26. Dawson Sutton; 27. Vito Cancilla; 62. Keelan Harvick; CRA Pro Series: 29. Kevin Harvick; 62. Keelan Harvick
- Manufacturer: Chevrolet
- Opened: 2008

Career
- Debut: 2021 NextEra Energy 250 (Daytona)
- Latest race: 2026 Love's RV Stop 225 (Talladega)
- Races competed: 138
- Drivers' Championships: 0
- Race victories: 1
- Pole positions: 0

Rackley-Willie Allen Racing (shortened to Rackley W.A.R.) is an American stock car racing team that competes in the CARS Tour, CARS Tour West, and ASA Late Model Series. The team previously competed in the NASCAR Craftsman Truck Series.

== History ==
The team was founded in 2008 by NASCAR Craftsman Truck Series driver Willie Allen as a Late Model team under the name Willie Allen Racing which was shortened to W.A.R. and as a shock builder under W.A.R. Shocks. They fielded Super Late Model's and Pro Late Model's in different series's. In 2020, Rackley Roofing CEO Curtis Sutton bought out half ownership of the team to form the team into a NASCAR Craftsman Truck Series team at the start of 2021. In October 2024, Rackley W.A.R. announced a partnership with Kevin Harvick Incorporated. A month later, the team moved its headquarters from Centerville, Tennessee to the former GMS Racing fabrication building in Statesville, North Carolina. On October 23, 2026, the team announced that they would shut down their Truck Series program at the conclusion of the Love's RV Stop 225 at Talladega Superspeedway, focusing more on their late model efforts.

== Craftsman Truck Series ==
=== Truck No. 25 history ===
==== Multiple drivers (2021) ====
On December 18, 2020, it was announced that former truck series driver, Willie Allen, and Rackley Roofing CEO, Curtis Sutton, would be forming their team, Rackley W.A.R., that would debut in the 2021 NASCAR Camping World Truck Series season, with Timothy Peters set as the full-time driver. The team made their first truck start at the 2021 NextEra Energy 250, finishing 26th, after suffering a mechanical issue. Peters' best finish for the team was 16th, at Las Vegas Motor Speedway.

On June 1, 2021, it was announced that Rackley W.A.R. and Timothy Peters would part ways after the the race at Charlotte. Josh Berry was announced as the new driver of the No. 25, scheduled to drive three races for the team, Texas, Nashville, and Pocono. Berry would give the team their best career finish, getting tenth at Texas. Berry would later go on to drive six more races for Rackley, starting at Knoxville.

Brett Moffitt would return to the truck series to drive the No. 25 at the Las Vegas. Moffitt would start 22nd and finish 25th.

After an eight-year hiatus, Willie Allen, co-founder of the team, made his Truck Series return at Talladega. Allen started 30th and finished eighteenth.

==== Matt DiBenedetto (2022–2023) ====
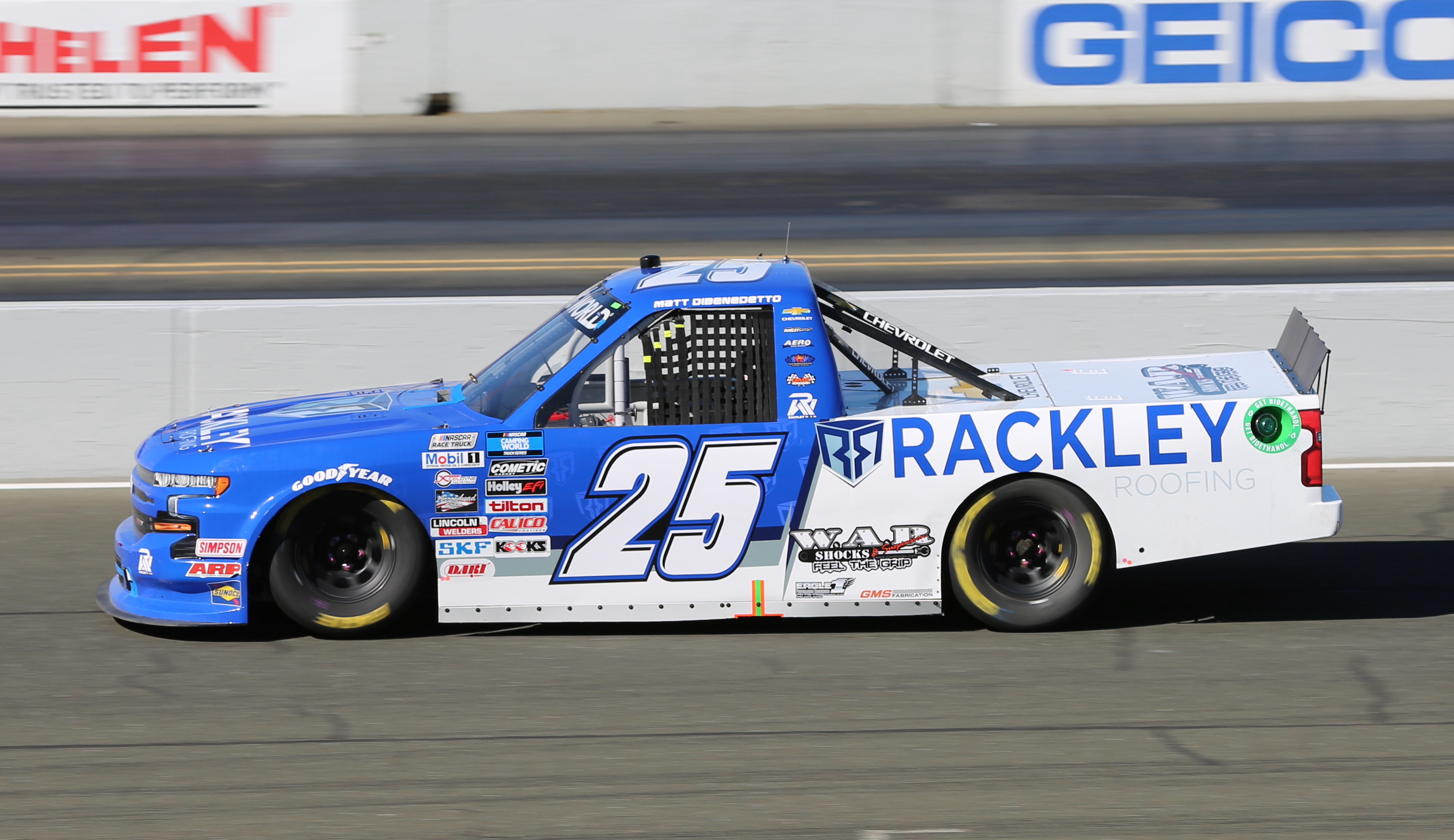
Matt DiBenedetto in the No. 25 at Sonoma Raceway in 2022

On January 6, 2022, it was announced that Matt DiBenedetto would drive the No. 25 truck full-time for the 2022 season. He started the season with a tenth-place finish at Daytona. DiBenedetto scored six top-10 finishes during the regular season, but was unable to make the playoffs. After a six race streak of finishing outside the top ten, DiBenedetto would give the team their first win in the Truck Series, after taking the checkered flag at the Talladega fall race.

On July 23, 2022, Rackley W.A.R. announced that DiBenedetto would return to the No. 25 for the 2023 season. DiBenedetto would start the 2023 season with a 20th-place finish at Daytona. Throughout the regular season, he earned nine top tens, six consecutive, with a best finish of third at North Wilkesboro. He was able to make the playoffs, the first for him and the organization in the Truck Series. On August 30, it was announced that DiBenedetto would be leaving Rackley W.A.R. after the 2023 season. DiBenedetto was eliminated from the playoffs at Kansas. On September 19, Rackley W.A.R. announced that DiBenedetto was let go from the team three races early, and that they were searching for a new driver(s) to finish the season. Chandler Smith drove the No. 25 truck at Talladega to a fourth-place finish. Trevor Bayne finished fourteenth at Homestead. For the final race of the season at Phoenix, Stefan Parsons drove the No. 25 to a 30th place DNF. The No. 25 finished ninth in the points standings.

==== Ty Dillon (2024) ====
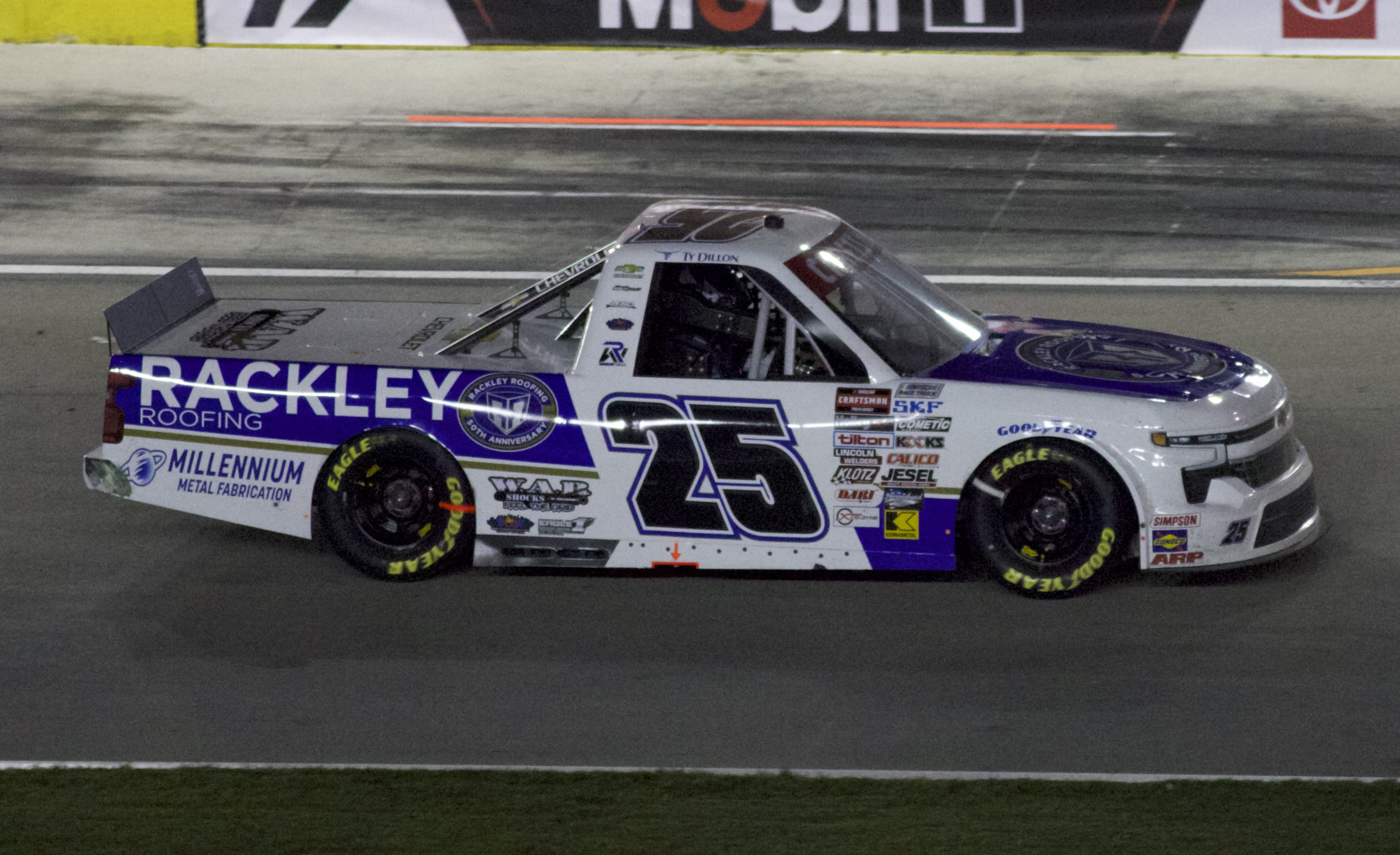
Ty Dillon in the No. 25 at Las Vegas Motor Speedway in 2024.

Ty Dillon was announced on December 29, 2023, as full-time driver of the No. 25 for the 2024 season. Rackley Roofing would return as primary sponsor for sixteen events, with yet to be announced sponsors for the remaining events. On September 23, Dawson Sutton took over as driver of the No. 25 for the remaining five races of the season, starting with the Kansas fall race.

==== Truck No. 25 results ====
Year	Driver	No.	Make	1	2	3	4	5	6	7	8	9	10	11	12	13	14	15	16	17	18	19	20	21	22	23	Owners	Pts
2021	Timothy Peters	25	Chevy	DAY; 26	DAY; 24	LVS; 16	ATL; 30	BRI; 30	RCH; 22	KAN; 21	DAR; 19	COA; 32	CLT; 38														19th	376
2021	Josh Berry	25	Chevy											TEX; 10	NSH; 19	POC; 11	KNX; 28	GLN; 11	GTW; 15	DAR; 17	BRI; 11			MAR; 28			19th	376
2021	Brett Moffitt	25	Chevy																			LVS; 25					19th	376
2021	Willie Allen	25	Chevy																				TAL; 18		PHO; 24		19th	376
2022	Matt DiBenedetto	25	Chevy	DAY; 10	LVS; 6	ATL; 30	COA; 31	MAR; 15	BRI; 35	DAR; 11	KAN; 7	TEX; 10	CLT; 17	GTW; 6	SON; 10	KNX; 14	NSH; 31	MOH; 19	POC; 12	IRP; 11	RCH; 17	KAN; 12	BRI; 27	TAL; 1	HOM; 19	PHO; 22	15th	521
2023	Matt DiBenedetto	25	Chevy	DAY; 20	LVS; 12	ATL; 6	COA; 29	TEX; 32	BRI; 10	MAR; 7	KAN; 29	DAR; 25	NWS; 3	CLT; 8	GTW; 6	NSH; 7	MOH; 8	POC; 10	RCH; 17	IRP; 10	MLW; 27	KAN; 3	BRI; 10				9th	2164
2023	Chandler Smith	25	Chevy																					TAL; 4			9th	2164
2023	Trevor Bayne	25	Chevy																						HOM; 14		9th	2164
2023	Stefan Parsons	25	Chevy																							PHO; 30	9th	2164
2024	Ty Dillon	25	Chevy	DAY; 35	ATL; 14	LVS; 26	BRI; 20	COA; 11	MAR; 23	TEX; 23	KAN; 15	DAR; 9	NWS; 25	CLT; 24	GTW; 13	NSH; 15	POC; 25	IRP; 18	RCH; 9	MLW; 16	BRI; 30						22nd	436
2024	Dawson Sutton	25	Chevy																			KAN; 5	TAL; 24	HOM; 19	MAR; 15	PHO; 20	22nd	436

=== Truck No. 26 history ===
==== Tate Fogleman (2022) ====
On June 20, 2022, Rackley W.A.R. announced that they will be fielding a second truck at Nashville, the No. 26, which was driven by Tate Fogleman. In three attempts, Fogleman qualified for one race, finishing twentieth at Pocono.

==== Dawson Sutton (2024–2026) ====
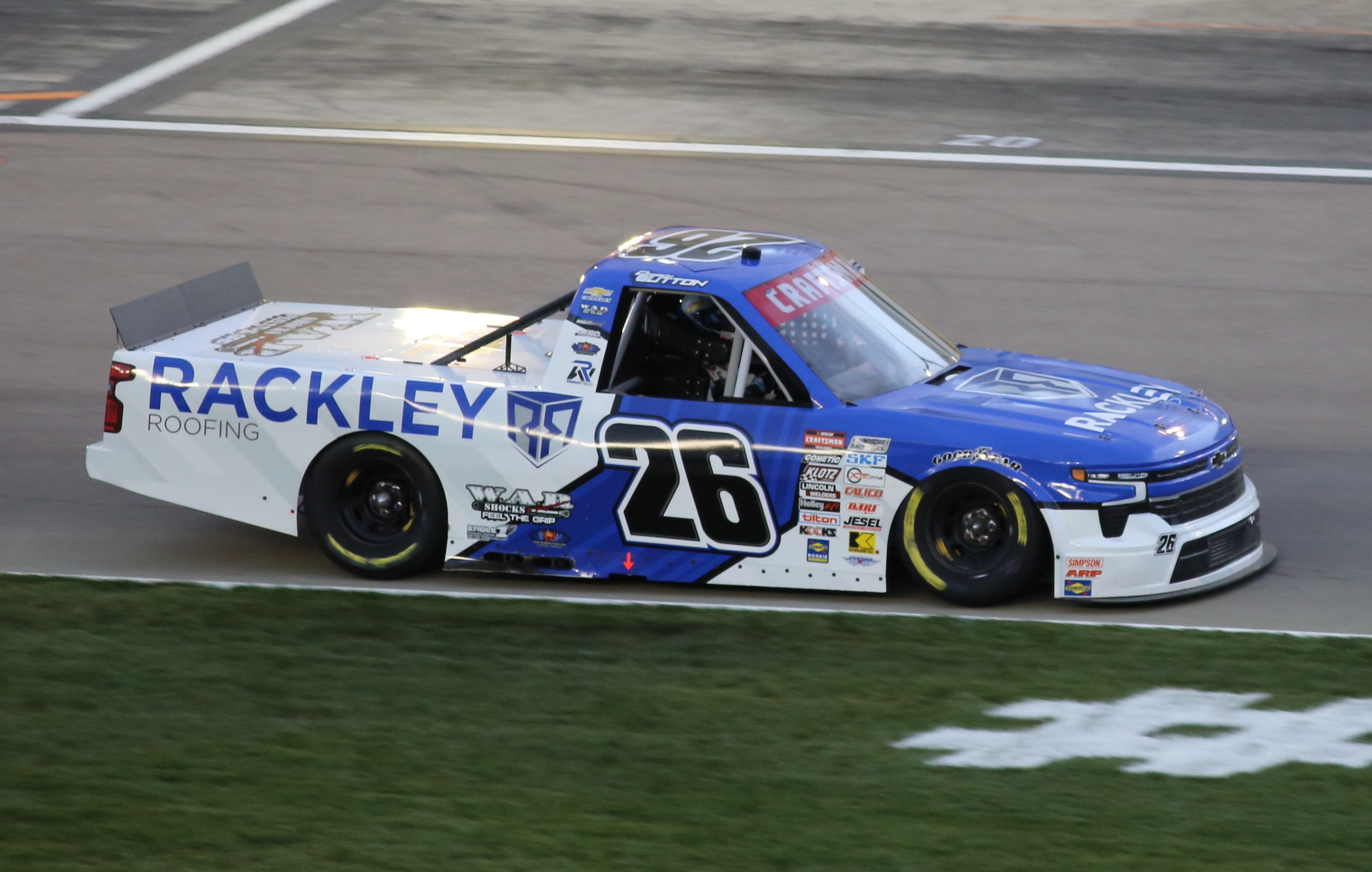
Dawson Sutton in the No. 26 truck at Las Vegas Motor Speedway in 2025.

On May 7, 2024, it was announced that Dawson Sutton, Rackley W.A.R.'s driver in Super Late Models and Pro Late Models, and the son of co-owner Curtis Sutton, would make his Truck Series debut at North Wilkesboro. On October 17, 2024 Sutton was announced as the full-time driver for the No. 26 truck. Sutton would start the 2025 season with a 25th-place finish at Daytona. He had two top-ten finishes with a best result of fourth at Talladega Superspeedway.

In October 2025, it was revealed that Sutton would remain full-time in the Truck Series with Rackley W.A.R. for the 2026 season. He would start the 2026 season with a 27th-place finish at Daytona. At regular season finale at New Hampshire, Toni Breidinger would drive the No. 26 truck while Sutton moved to the No. 27 truck. However after failing to qualify in the No. 27, Sutton moved back to the No. 26 for the race. Sutton would miss the race at Kansas due to scheduling conflict. As the result, Breidinger would take over the driving duties. On October 23, it was announced that the team would shut down following Talladega.

==== Truck No. 26 results ====
Year	Driver	No.	Make	1	2	3	4	5	6	7	8	9	10	11	12	13	14	15	16	17	18	19	20	21	22	23	24	25	Owners	Pts
2022	Tate Fogleman	26	Chevy	DAY	LVS	ATL	COA	MAR	BRD	DAR	KAN	TEX	CLT	GTW	SON	KNX	NSH; DNQ	MOH	POC; 20	IRP	RCH	KAN; DNQ	BRI	TAL	HOM	PHO			47th	17
2024	Dawson Sutton	26	Chevy	DAY	ATL	LVS	BRI	COA	MAR	TEX	KAN	DAR	NWS; 28	CLT	GTW	NSH; 18	POC	IRP	RCH	MLW	BRI	KAN	TAL	HOM	MAR	PHO			40th	28
2025	Dawson Sutton	26	Chevy	DAY; 25	ATL; 17	LVS; 19	HOM; 23	MAR; 16	BRI; 17	CAR; 19	TEX; 9	KAN; 15	NWS; 26	CLT; 31	NSH; 11	MCH; 13	POC; 29	LRP; 30	IRP; 19	GLN; 14	RCH; 31	DAR; 19	BRI; 17	NHA; 14	ROV; 13	TAL; 4	MAR; 19	PHO; 34	22nd	447
2026	Dawson Sutton	26	Chevy	DAY; 27	ATL; 32	STP; 33	DAR; 19	ROC; 15	BRI; 7	TEX; 16	GLN; 19	DOV; 23	CLT; 21	NSH; 17	MCH; 36	COR; 26	LRP; 15	NWS; 16	IRP; 17	RCH; 26	NHA; 25	BRI; 15		CLT; 14	PHO; 22	TAL; 18	MAR	HOM	27th	377
2026	Toni Breidinger	26	Chevy																		NHA; QL		KAN; 26						27th	377

=== Truck No. 27 history ===
==== William Byron (2021) ====
On June 3, 2021, Rackley W.A.R. announced that Cup Series driver, William Byron, will make his truck series return at Nashville Superspeedway for the Rackley Roofing 200, under a second entry for the team. It was his first truck series start since 2016, where he finished fifth in the championship. Byron finished 36th due to an engine failure.

==== Part-time with multiple drivers (2026) ====
On January 21, 2026, Rackley W.A.R. announced that Toni Breidinger will drive part-time in the No. 27 for eight races. On May 18, 2026, it was announced that Kasey Kleyn will attempt to make his debut in the NASCAR Craftsman Truck Series at North Wilkesboro Speedway, driving the No. 27 truck. He would also drive the No. 27 at Richmond. However, he failed to qualify for the race. At regular season finale at New Hampshire, Dawson Sutton would attempt to qualify in the No. 27 truck. However, he failed to qualify for the race and returned to drive his No. 26 truck.

==== Truck No. 27 results ====
Year	Driver	No.	Make	1	2	3	4	5	6	7	8	9	10	11	12	13	14	15	16	17	18	19	20	21	22	23	24	25	Owners	Pts
2021	William Byron	27	Chevy	DAY	DAY	LVS	ATL	BRI	RCH	KAN	DAR	COA	CLT	TEX	NSH; 36	POC	KNX	GLN	GTW	DAR	BRI	LVS	TAL	MAR	PHO				49th	3
2026	Toni Breidinger	27	Chevy	DAY; DNQ	ATL	STP	DAR	CAR	BRI	TEX; 18	GLN	DOV; 23	CLT	NSH; DNQ	MCH	COR	LRP		IRP; 25										40th	44
2026	Kasey Kleyn	27	Chevy															NWS; 35		RCH; DNQ									40th	44
2026	Dawson Sutton	27	Chevy																		NHA; DNQ	BRI	KAN	CLT	PHO	TAL	MAR	HOM	40th	44
