= Keith McGee =

American racing driver

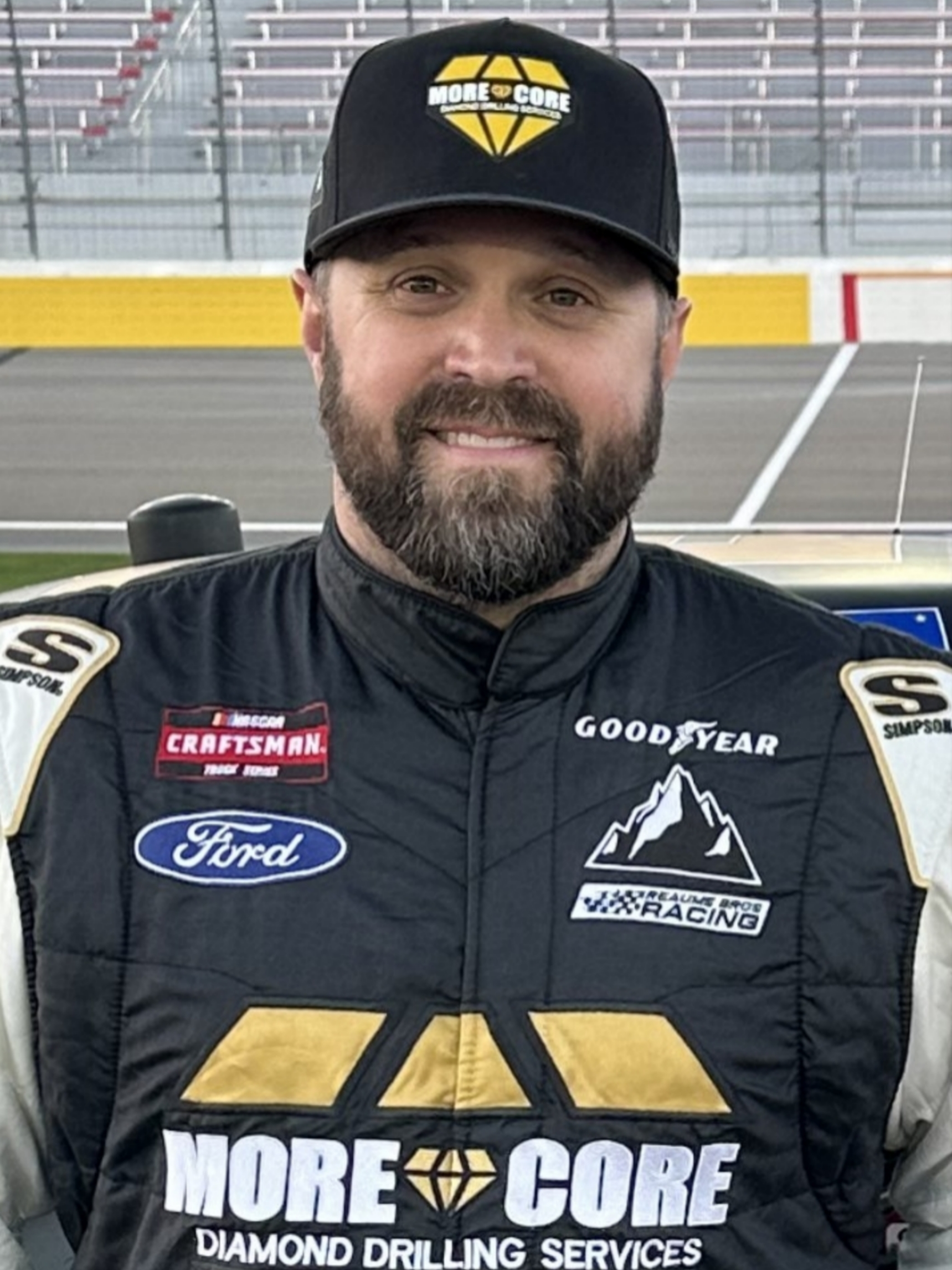
- McGee at Las Vegas Motor Speedway in 2024
- Born: Keith Edward McGee; May 7, 1981 (age 45); Truckee, California, U.S.
- Achievements: 2023 Danger Ranger 9000 Winner 2024 2.4 Hours of LeMullets Winner

NASCAR FedEx Freight Truck Series career
- 24 races run over 5 years
- 2025 position: 65th
- Best finish: 36th (2024)
- First race: 2021 ToyotaCare 250 (Richmond)
- Last race: 2025 Baptist Health 200 (Homestead)
Wins	Top tens	Poles
0	1	0

ARCA Menards Series West career
- 5 races run over 2 years
- Best finish: 19th (2019)
- First race: 2018 NAPA Auto Parts 175 (Bakersfield)
- Last race: 2019 Arizona Lottery 100 (Phoenix)
Wins	Top tens	Poles
0	2	0
- Statistics up to date as of November 1, 2025.

Keith Edward McGee (born May 7, 1981) is an American professional stock car racing driver. He last competed part-time in the NASCAR Craftsman Truck Series, driving the Nos. 2/22 Ford F-150 for Reaume Brothers Racing. He has also previously competed in what is now the ARCA Menards Series West.

McGee previously served in the United States Air Force for eight years. McGee is notable for being the first Alaskan and the first disabled veteran to compete in a NASCAR national series race.

== Racing career ==
=== Early career ===
McGee was interested in racing as a child, but he either could become a professional snowboarder or go to the military, and he chose the latter. After moving from California to Alaska and serving for eight years in the United States Air Force beginning in 2001, he started racing when a go-kart facility opened near his town of Eagle River, Alaska. At the time, he was age 35.

He competed in 115 local go-karting events in 2017, racking up 78 wins. He competed in the Extreme Racing League, a go-kart series in its first year, where he won every race on the way to the championship. In 2018, McGee competed in the NASCAR Whelen All-American Series, finishing second in points and driving at his home track, Alaska Raceway Park. He also won the championship in the Pro Grand National Series.

=== NASCAR and ARCA ===
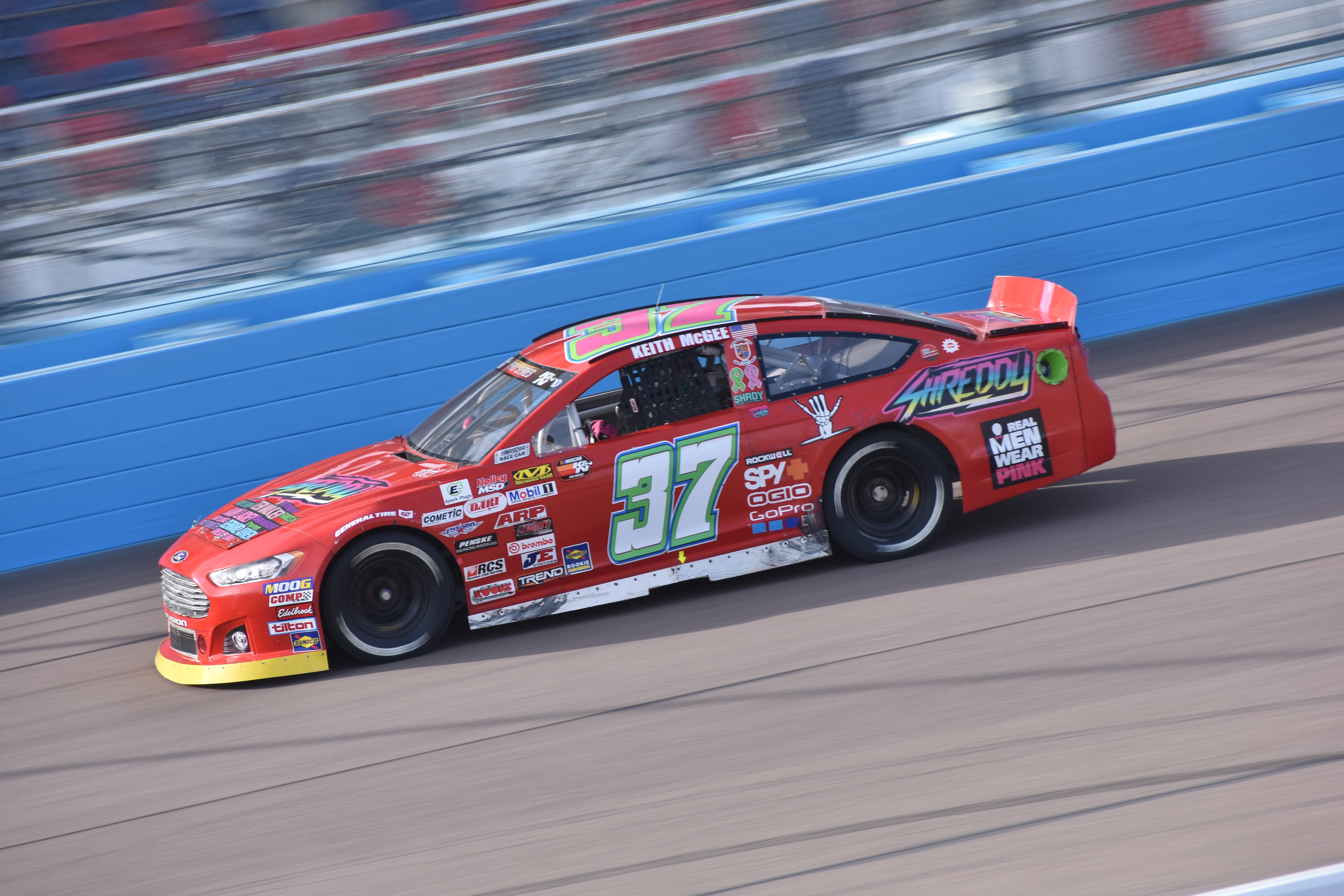
McGee during practice for the West Series race at Phoenix in 2019

McGee made his debut in the NASCAR K&N Pro Series West at the 2018 season-finale at Kern County Raceway Park in the No. 39 for Patriot Motorsports Group, but finished last, not finishing the race due to clutch issues.

For 2019, McGee had been announced to run at the Tucson doubleheader race in one of the Jefferson Pitts Racing cars, but this did not end up happening. His first start of the year came at Douglas County Speedway in Oregon in June of that year. He drove the No. 37 and finished eleventh. He later got his first top-ten in his next race at Meridian Speedway in Idaho. It was just his third start in the West Series.

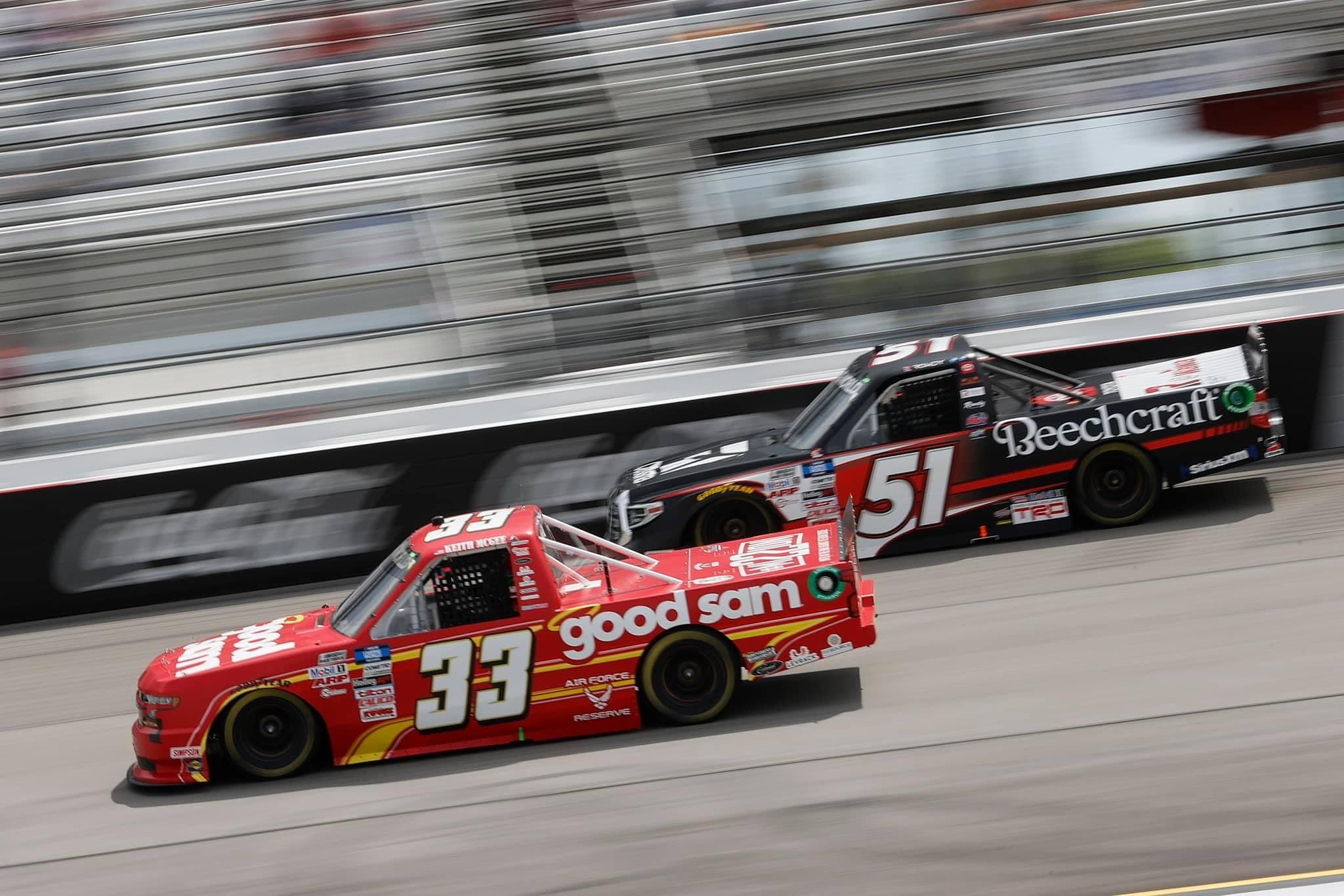
McGee (No. 33) racing Kyle Busch (No. 51) in his Truck Series debut at Richmond in 2021

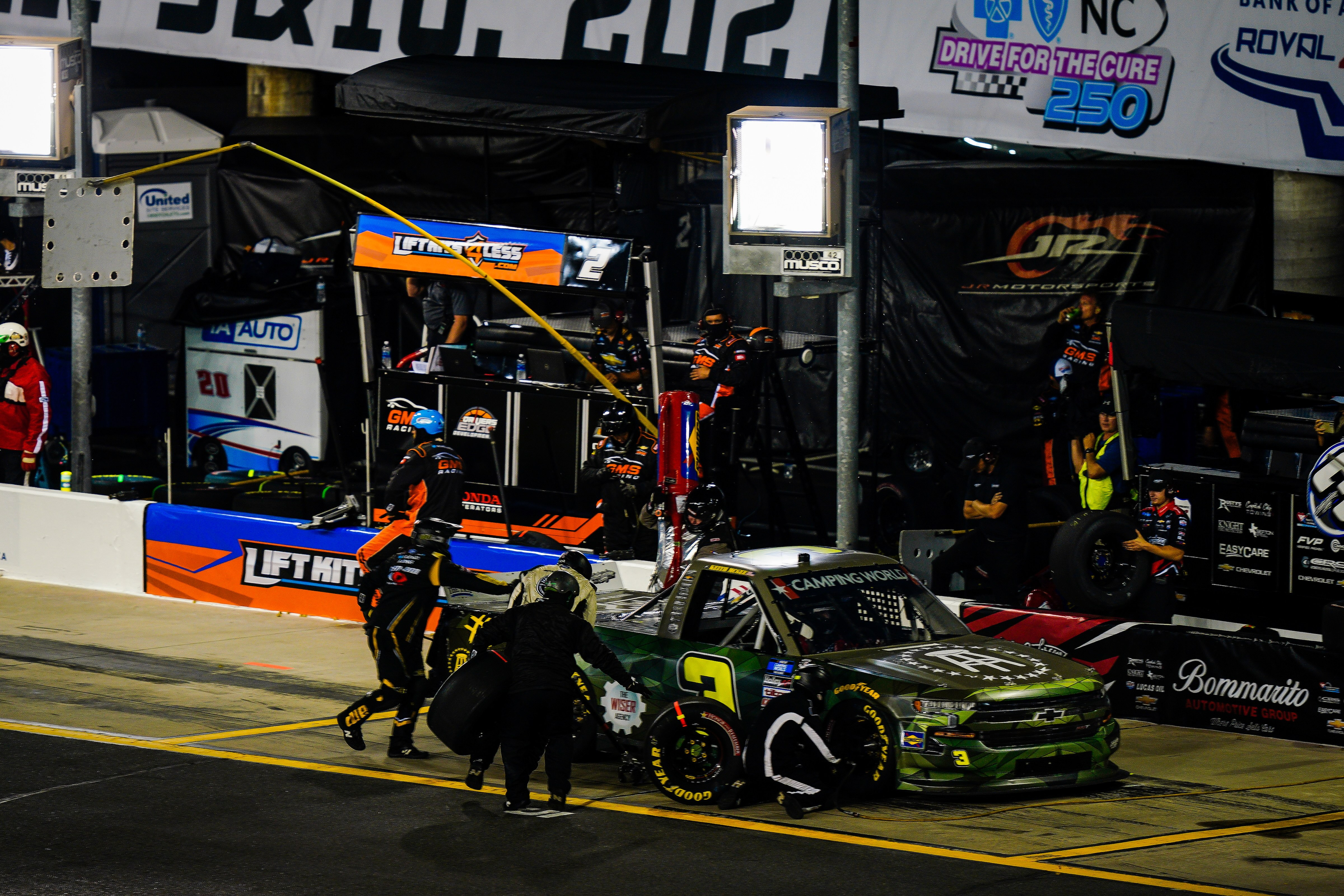
McGee making a pit stop in the Truck Series race at Charlotte in 2021

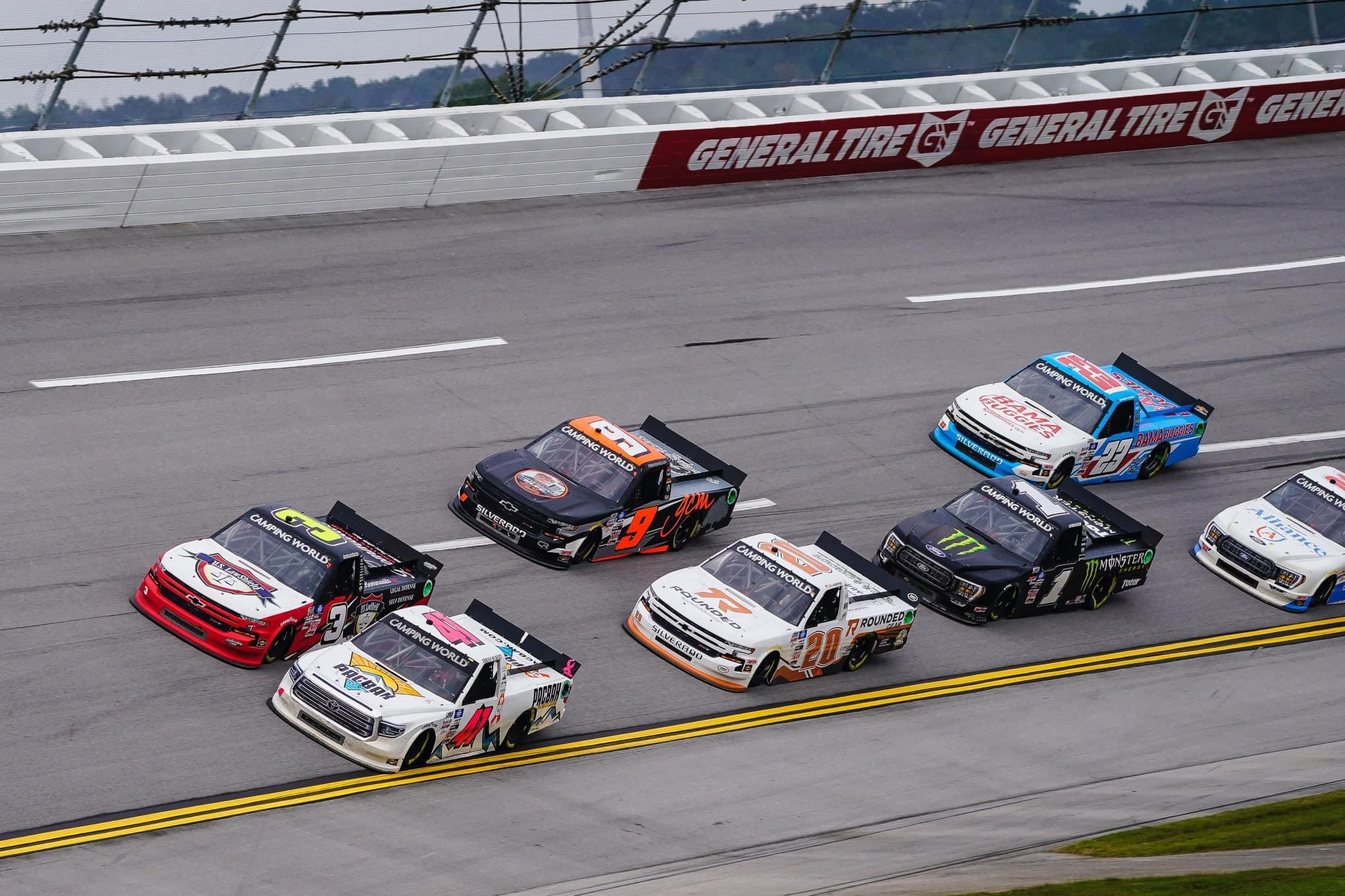
McGee (No. 41) leading a pack in the Truck Series race at Talladega in 2021. He would finish 10th in this race.

McGee stated in an interview for the Racing-Reference website that he was hoping to run full-time in the ARCA Series and also make his Truck Series debut in 2020. He did drive an ARCA Menards Series car for the first time at the series' Daytona testing in January 2020, driving for Our Motorsports in the No. 02 car (along with Andy Seuss, Sebastian Arias, and Ronnie Osmer). McGee ended up not running the race there in February (Seuss and Benny Chastain filled the seats of team's two cars in that race), nor any others for the team and in the series in 2020. On the Truck side, McGee did try to attempt to make his Truck debut at Talladega, driving the No. 33 for Reaume Brothers Racing, but those plans were called off and postponed once he was not approved to race there. With his first start in the series coming at a restrictor plate track during the COVID-19 pandemic, where NASCAR canceled all practice and qualifying for the race, McGee would have gotten behind the wheel of a truck for the first time in the race, which NASCAR was against (the same thing happened in June to James Davison in the Cup Series, also at Talladega). As a result, RBR stated that he would make his Truck debut for them sometime in 2021. On January 18, 2021, Reaume announced that McGee's first race would be at Richmond and that he would be in the No. 33, which would be a Chevy in that race. In addition, the team stated that he could run more races in 2021 if sponsorship could be found. On May 25, 2021, McGee announced that he would be competing in the race at Charlotte in the No. 3 for Jordan Anderson Racing. After previously sponsoring Matt DiBenedetto in 2019 and Clint Bowyer in 2020, both in the NASCAR Cup Series, Barstool Sports returned to NASCAR as McGee's sponsor in this race. McGee later drove the No. 49 CMI Motorsports Ford at the Victoria's Voice Foundation 200. In his last appearance of the year at Talladega Superspeedway, he was one of only five trucks that finished clean, leading a lap and running in the top-fifteen for the final twenty laps; avoiding a last lap crash, he slipped to tenth for his best finish of the season.

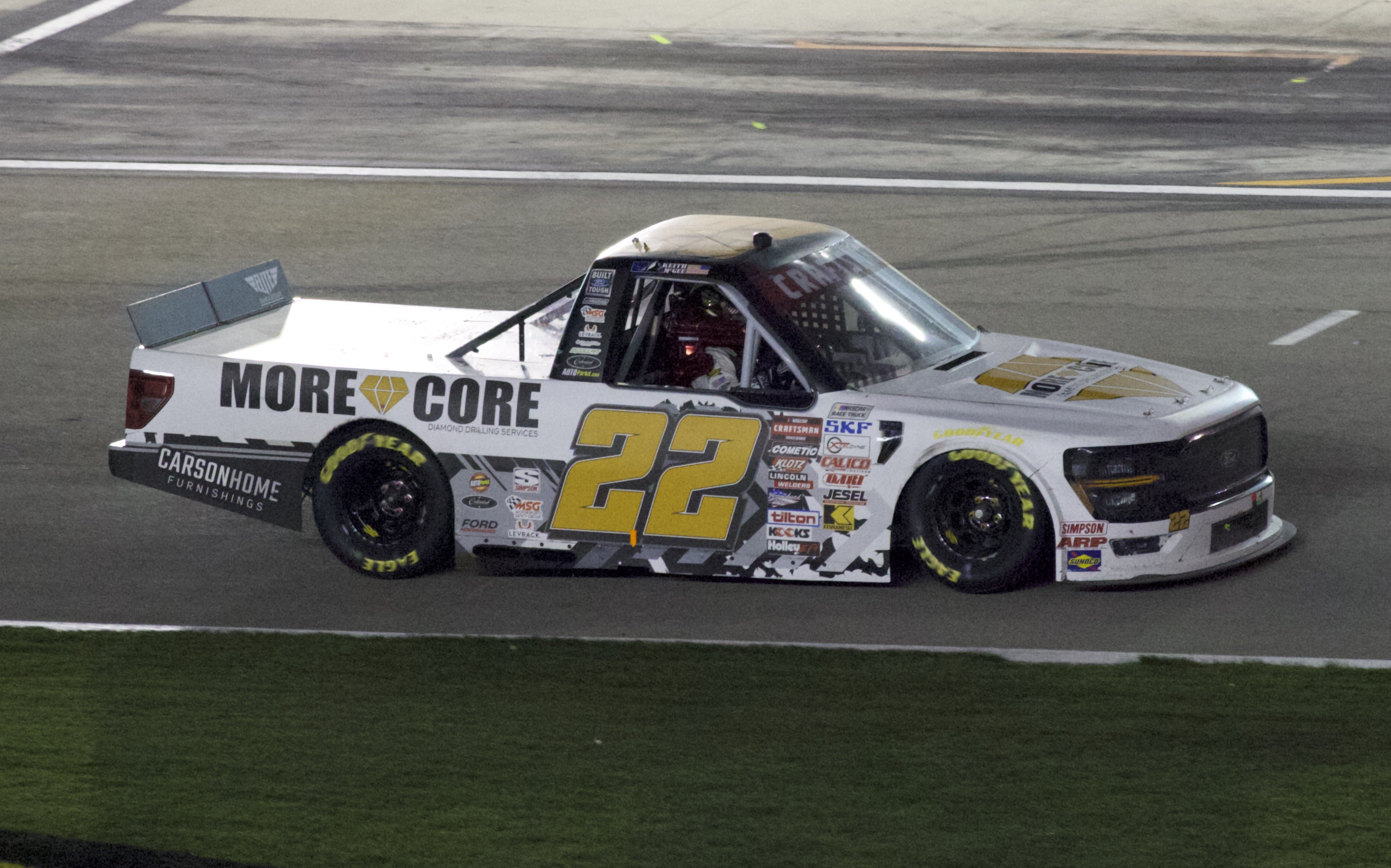
McGee's No. 22 truck at Las Vegas Motor Speedway in 2024.

On November 11, 2023, RBR announced that McGee would return to drive for the team in one of their trucks, the No. 27, in 2024 in six races: Daytona, Las Vegas, Texas, Charlotte, Richmond and Phoenix. On October 4, 2024, McGee ran the No. 02 for Young's Motorsports, but instead of their usual Chevrolet, it was a technical partnership with RBR, so it was a Ford instead. He failed to qualify for the race but ended up replacing Bryan Dauzat in the No. 28 FDNY Racing Chevrolet.

== Personal life ==
McGee grew up in Nevada County, California, and is the youngest of seven children in his family. He moved from California to Alaska in 2005 when he was serving in the military. However, after his service ended, he did not move back to California and remained in Alaska living there permanently. He got a job as a RADAR specialist for the U.S. Department of Defense.

His grandfather worked on and built racecars for drivers on the west coast of the U.S. McGee and his father, also involved in racing as a driver for Factory Polaris, would also watch NASCAR races on TV and attend local Sprint car races in person. McGee's mother competed in the 1988 Winter Olympics in Calgary and won a gold medal after being diagnosed with multiple sclerosis earlier in her life and being told she would not be able to walk again. His mother is also a cancer survivor, which is why McGee often runs with Breast Cancer Awareness ribbons on his West Series cars and has run some races with his car number being the color pink.

== Motorsports career results ==
=== NASCAR ===
(key) (Bold – Pole position awarded by qualifying time. Italics – Pole position earned by points standings or practice time. * – Most laps led.)

==== Craftsman Truck Series ====
NASCAR Craftsman Truck Series results
Year	Team	No.	Make	1	2	3	4	5	6	7	8	9	10	11	12	13	14	15	16	17	18	19	20	21	22	23	24	25	NCTC	Pts	Ref
2021	Reaume Brothers Racing	33	Chevy	DAY	DRC	LVS	ATL	BRD	RCH; 30	KAN	DAR	COA		TEX; 29															46th	55	
2021	Jordan Anderson Racing	3	Chevy										CLT; 29		NSH; DNQ	POC	KNX	GLN	GTW	DAR	BRI								46th	55	
2021	CMI Motorsports	49	Toyota																			LVS; 32							46th	55	
2021	Cram Racing Enterprises	41	Toyota																				TAL; 10	MAR	PHO				46th	55	
2022	Reaume Brothers Racing	43	Chevy	DAY	LVS	ATL	COA	MAR	BRD; 34	DAR	KAN	TEX																	66th	10	
2022	Reaume Brothers Racing	43	Toyota										CLT; 33	GTW	SON	KNX	NSH	MOH	POC	IRP	RCH	KAN	BRI	TAL	HOM				66th	10	
2022	Reaume Brothers Racing	33	Chevy																							PHO; 34			66th	10	
2023	Reaume Brothers Racing	34	Ford	DAY	LVS	ATL; 36	COA	TEX; 33	BRD	MAR	KAN	DAR	NWS	CLT; 36	GTW	NSH	MOH	POC	RCH	IRP	MLW	KAN	BRI						76th	6	
2023	Reaume Brothers Racing	33	Ford																					TAL; DNQ	HOM	PHO; DNQ			76th	6	
2024	Reaume Brothers Racing	27	Ford	DAY; 31												NSH; DNQ	POC	IRP											36th	85	
2024	Reaume Brothers Racing	22	Ford		ATL; 21	LVS; 27	BRI; 32	COA	MAR	TEX; 28	KAN	DAR	NWS	CLT; 34	GTW; 27				RCH; 34	MLW	BRI; 33	KAN				PHO; 29			36th	85	
2024	Reaume Brothers Racing	02	Ford																				TAL; DNQ						36th	85	
2024	FDNY Racing	28	Chevy																				TAL; 26	HOM	MAR				36th	85	
2025	Reaume Brothers Racing	2	Ford	DAY	ATL; 32	LVS																							65th	12	
2025	Reaume Brothers Racing	22	Ford				HOM; 30	MAR	BRI	CAR	TEX	KAN	NWS	CLT	NSH	MCH	POC	LRP	IRP	GLN	RCH	DAR	BRI	NHA	ROV	TAL	MAR	PHO	65th	12	

^{*} Season still in progress
^{1} Ineligible for series points

==== K&N Pro Series West ====
NASCAR K&N Pro Series West results
Year	Team	No.	Make	1	2	3	4	5	6	7	8	9	10	11	12	13	14	NKNPSWC	Pts	Ref
2018	Patriot Motorsports Group	39	Ford	KCR	TUS	TUS	OSS	CNS	SON	DCS	IOW	EVG	GTW	LVS	MER	AAS	KCR; 18	55th	26	
2019	Kart Idaho Racing	37	Chevy	LVS	IRW	TUS	TUS	CNS	SON	DCS; 11	IOW	EVG	GTW					19th	121	
2019	Kart Idaho Racing	37	Ford											MER; 10	AAS; 10	KCR	PHO; 24	19th	121	

Achievements
Preceded by Joseph Joiner and Jonathan Joiner	2.4 Hours of LeMullets Winner; 2024	Succeeded by Carson Hocevar and Cleetus McFarland
