= 2024 Love's RV Stop 225 =

20th race of the 2024 NASCAR Craftsman Truck Series

Race details
- Race 20 of 23 of the 2024 NASCAR Craftsman Truck Series
- Date: October 4, 2024
- Official name: 19th Annual Love's RV Stop 225
- Location: Talladega Superspeedway in Lincoln, Alabama
- Course: Permanent racing facility
- Course length: 2.66 miles (4.28 km)
- Distance: 85 laps, 225 mi (363 km)
- Scheduled distance: 85 laps, 225 mi (363 km)
- Average speed: 125.148 mph (201.406 km/h)

Pole position
Driver	William Sawalich	Tricon Garage
- Time: 54.482

Most laps led
Driver	Grant Enfinger	CR7 Motorsports
- Laps: 34

Winner
No. 9	Grant Enfinger	CR7 Motorsports

Television in the United States
- Network: FS1
- Announcers: Adam Alexander, Phil Parsons, and Michael Waltrip

Radio in the United States
- Radio: MRN

The 2024 Love's RV Stop 225 was the 20th stock car race of the 2024 NASCAR Craftsman Truck Series, the first race of the Round of 8, and the 19th iteration of the event. The race was held on Friday, October 4, 2024, at Talladega Superspeedway in Lincoln, Alabama, a 2.66 miles (4.28 km) permanent tri-oval shaped superspeedway. The race took the scheduled 85 laps to complete. In a wild finish, Grant Enfinger, driving for CR7 Motorsports, would hold off a hard-charging field in the final nine laps, and eventually won the race after the caution came out on the frontstretch with one lap to go. This was Enfinger's 11th career NASCAR Craftsman Truck Series win, his first of the season, and the first win for CR7 Motorsports as an organization. Enfinger also dominated the majority of the race, leading a race-high 34 laps. Along with the win, he would claim a spot in the Championship 4. To fill out the podium, Taylor Gray, driving for Tricon Garage, and Daniel Dye, driving for McAnally-Hilgemann Racing, would finish 2nd and 3rd, respectively.

== Report ==
=== Background ===
Talladega Superspeedway, the circuit where the race was held.

Talladega Superspeedway, originally known as Alabama International Motor Superspeedway (AIMS), is a motorsports complex located north of Talladega, Alabama. It is located on the former Anniston Air Force Base in the small city of Lincoln. The track is a tri-oval and was constructed in the 1960s by the International Speedway Corporation, a business controlled by the France family. Talladega is most known for its steep banking and the unique location of the start/finish line that's located just past the exit to pit road. The track currently hosts the NASCAR series such as the NASCAR Cup Series, Xfinity Series and the Craftsman Truck Series. Talladega is the longest NASCAR oval with a length of 2.66-mile-long (4.28 km) tri-oval like the Daytona International Speedway, which also is a 2.5-mile-long (4 km) tri-oval.

==== Entry list ====
- (R) denotes rookie driver.
- (i) denotes driver who is ineligible for series driver points.
- (P) denotes playoff driver.

#	Driver	Team	Make
1	William Sawalich	Tricon Garage	Toyota
02	Keith McGee	Young's Motorsports	Ford
2	Nick Sanchez (P)	Rev Racing	Chevrolet
04	Cory Roper	Roper Racing	Chevrolet
5	Dean Thompson	Tricon Garage	Toyota
6	Norm Benning	Norm Benning Racing	Chevrolet
7	Connor Zilisch (i)	Spire Motorsports	Chevrolet
9	Grant Enfinger (P)	CR7 Motorsports	Chevrolet (Note: Due to a glitch in NASCAR's system, Enfinger's manufacturer was initially listed as Oldsmobile.)
11	Corey Heim (P)	Tricon Garage	Toyota
13	Jake Garcia	ThorSport Racing	Ford
15	Tanner Gray	Tricon Garage	Toyota
16	Johnny Sauter	Hattori Racing Enterprises	Toyota
17	Taylor Gray (P)	Tricon Garage	Toyota
18	Tyler Ankrum (P)	McAnally-Hilgemann Racing	Chevrolet
19	Christian Eckes (P)	McAnally-Hilgemann Racing	Chevrolet
21	Mason Maggio	Floridian Motorsports	Toyota
22	Jason White	Reaume Brothers Racing	Ford
25	Dawson Sutton	Rackley WAR	Chevrolet
28	Bryan Dauzat (Note: After Keith McGee failed to qualify in his No. 02 truck, Dauzat would give up his ride and allow McGee to pilot the No. 28 truck during the race.)	FDNY Racing	Chevrolet
32	Bret Holmes	Bret Holmes Racing	Chevrolet
33	Lawless Alan	Reaume Brothers Racing	Ford
38	Layne Riggs (R)	Front Row Motorsports	Ford
41	Bayley Currey	Niece Motorsports	Chevrolet
42	Matt Mills	Niece Motorsports	Chevrolet
43	Daniel Dye	McAnally-Hilgemann Racing	Chevrolet
44	Danny Bohn	Niece Motorsports	Chevrolet
45	Kaden Honeycutt	Niece Motorsports	Chevrolet
52	Stewart Friesen	Halmar Friesen Racing	Toyota
56	Timmy Hill	Hill Motorsports	Toyota
71	Rajah Caruth (P)	Spire Motorsports	Chevrolet
75	Stefan Parsons	Henderson Motorsports	Chevrolet
76	Spencer Boyd	Freedom Racing Enterprises	Chevrolet
77	Chase Purdy	Spire Motorsports	Chevrolet
88	Matt Crafton	ThorSport Racing	Ford
91	Ryan Reed	McAnally-Hilgemann Racing	Chevrolet
95	Clay Greenfield	GK Racing	Chevrolet
98	Ty Majeski (P)	ThorSport Racing	Ford
99	Ben Rhodes	ThorSport Racing	Ford
Official entry list

== Qualifying ==
Qualifying was held on Friday, October 4, at 12:30 PM CST. Since Talladega Superspeedway is a superspeedway, the qualifying system used is a single-car, single-lap system with two rounds. In the first round, drivers will be on track by themselves and will have one lap to set a time to determine positions 11–36. The fastest ten drivers from the first round move on to the second round to determine positions 1–10. Whoever sets the fastest time in Round 2 will win the pole.

William Sawalich, driving for Tricon Garage, would win the pole after advancing from the preliminary round and setting the fastest time in Round 2, with a lap of 54.482, and a speed of 175.764 mph (282.865 km/h).

The #46 truck team for Young's Motorsports was planning to make an attempt to race, but the entry list showed that they withdrew from the race. Timmy Hill was the only driver who failed to qualify. Keith McGee had originally failed to qualify in his No. 02 truck, but after Bryan Dauzat gave up his No. 28 FDNY Racing ride, he allowed McGee to take over the truck during the race.

=== Qualifying results ===
Pos.	#	Driver	Team	Make	Time (R1)	Speed (R1)	Time (R2)	Speed (R2)
1	1	William Sawalich	Tricon Garage	Toyota	54.728	174.974	54.482	175.764
2	99	Ben Rhodes	ThorSport Racing	Ford	54.554	175.532	54.518	175.648
3	98	Ty Majeski (P)	ThorSport Racing	Ford	54.588	175.423	54.539	175.581
4	9	Grant Enfinger (P)	CR7 Motorsports	Chevrolet	54.752	174.898	54.579	175.452
5	17	Taylor Gray (P)	Tricon Garage	Toyota	54.703	175.054	54.581	175.446
6	77	Chase Purdy	Spire Motorsports	Chevrolet	54.679	175.131	54.656	175.205
7	18	Tyler Ankrum (P)	McAnally-Hilgemann Racing	Chevrolet	54.833	174.639	54.680	175.128
8	42	Matt Mills	Niece Motorsports	Chevrolet	54.707	175.042	54.708	175.038
9	11	Corey Heim (P)	Tricon Garage	Toyota	54.707	175.042	54.770	174.840
10	13	Jake Garcia	ThorSport Racing	Ford	54.740	174.936	54.843	174.608
Eliminated in Round 1
11	2	Nick Sanchez (P)	Rev Racing	Chevrolet	54.855	174.569	—	—
12	7	Connor Zilisch (i)	Spire Motorsports	Chevrolet	54.856	174.566	—	—
13	71	Rajah Caruth (P)	Spire Motorsports	Chevrolet	54.862	174.547	—	—
14	5	Dean Thompson	Tricon Garage	Toyota	54.874	174.509	—	—
15	19	Christian Eckes (P)	McAnally-Hilgemann Racing	Chevrolet	54.880	174.490	—	—
16	33	Lawless Alan	Reaume Brothers Racing	Ford	54.883	174.480	—	—
17	88	Matt Crafton	ThorSport Racing	Ford	54.886	174.471	—	—
18	45	Kaden Honeycutt	Niece Motorsports	Chevrolet	54.907	174.404	—	—
19	32	Bret Holmes	Bret Holmes Racing	Chevrolet	54.910	174.394	—	—
20	76	Spencer Boyd	Freedom Racing Enterprises	Chevrolet	54.916	174.375	—	—
21	95	Clay Greenfield	GK Racing	Chevrolet	54.937	174.309	—	—
22	91	Ryan Reed	McAnally-Hilgemann Racing	Chevrolet	54.992	174.134	—	—
23	75	Stefan Parsons	Henderson Motorsports	Chevrolet	55.023	174.036	—	—
24	28	Bryan Dauzat	FDNY Racing	Chevrolet	55.032	174.008	—	—
25	04	Cory Roper	Roper Racing	Chevrolet	55.059	173.923	—	—
26	52	Stewart Friesen	Halmar Friesen Racing	Toyota	55.063	173.910	—	—
27	22	Jason White	Reaume Brothers Racing	Ford	55.113	173.752	—	—
28	44	Danny Bohn	Niece Motorsports	Chevrolet	55.215	173.431	—	—
29	21	Mason Maggio	Floridian Motorsports	Toyota	55.314	173.121	—	—
30	25	Dawson Sutton	Rackley WAR	Chevrolet	55.329	173.074	—	—
31	6	Norm Benning	Norm Benning Racing	Chevrolet	55.418	172.796	—	—
Qualified by owner's points
32	41	Bayley Currey	Niece Motorsports	Chevrolet	55.556	172.367	—	—
33	38	Layne Riggs (R)	Front Row Motorsports	Ford	—	—	—	—
34	15	Tanner Gray	Tricon Garage	Toyota	—	—	—	—
35	43	Daniel Dye	McAnally-Hilgemann Racing	Chevrolet	—	—	—	—
Past champion provisional
36	16	Johnny Sauter	Hattori Racing Enterprises	Toyota	55.719	171.862	—	—
Failed to qualify
37	56	Timmy Hill	Hill Motorsports	Toyota	55.701	171.918	—	—
38	02	Keith McGee	Young's Motorsports	Ford	56.148	170.549	—	—
Official qualifying results
Official starting lineup

== Race results ==
Stage 1 Laps: 20

Pos.	#	Driver	Team	Make	Pts
1	42	Matt Mills	Niece Motorsports	Chevrolet	10
2	9	Grant Enfinger (P)	CR7 Motorsports	Chevrolet	9
3	13	Jake Garcia	ThorSport Racing	Ford	8
5	7	Connor Zilisch (i)	Spire Motorsports	Chevrolet	0
5	1	William Sawalich	Tricon Garage	Toyota	6
6	5	Dean Thompson	Tricon Garage	Toyota	5
7	99	Ty Majeski (P)	ThorSport	Ford	4
8	33	Lawless Alan	Reaume Brothers Racing	Chevrolet	3
9	17	Taylor Gray (P)	Tricon Garage	Toyota	2
10	15	Tanner Gray	Tricon Garage	Toyota	1

Stage 2 Laps: 20

Pos.	#	Driver	Team	Make	Pts
1	9	Grant Enfinger (P)	CR7 Motorsports	Chevrolet	10
2	13	Jake Garcia	ThorSport Racing	Ford	9
3	33	Lawless Alan	Reaume Brothers Racing	Chevrolet	8
4	19	Christian Eckes (P)	McAnally-Hilgemann Racing	Chevrolet	7
5	5	Dean Thompson	Tricon Garage	Toyota	6
6	71	Rajah Caruth (P)	Spire Motorsports	Chevrolet	5
7	11	Corey Heim (P)	Tricon Garage	Toyota	4
8	15	Tanner Gray	Tricon Garage	Toyota	3
9	18	Tyler Ankrum (P)	McAnally-Hilgemann Racing	Chevrolet	2
10	75	Stefan Parsons	Henderson Motorsports	Chevrolet	1

Stage 3 Laps: 59

Fin	St	#	Driver	Team	Make	Laps	Led	Status	Pts
1	4	9	Grant Enfinger (P)	CR7 Motorsports	Chevrolet	85	34	Running	59
2	5	17	Taylor Gray (P)	Tricon Garage	Toyota	85	0	Running	37
3	35	43	Daniel Dye	McAnally-Hilgemann Racing	Chevrolet	85	3	Running	34
4	13	71	Rajah Caruth (P)	Spire Motorsports	Chevrolet	85	2	Running	38
5	16	33	Lawless Alan	Reaume Brothers Racing	Ford	85	0	Running	43
6	15	19	Christian Eckes (P)	McAnally-Hilgemann Racing	Chevrolet	85	8	Running	38
7	22	91	Ryan Reed	McAnally-Hilgemann Racing	Chevrolet	85	0	Running	30
8	23	75	Stefan Parsons	Henderson Motorsports	Chevrolet	85	0	Running	29
9	19	32	Bret Holmes	Bret Holmes Racing	Chevrolet	85	0	Running	30
10	20	76	Spencer Boyd	Freedom Racing Enterprises	Chevrolet	85	0	Running	27
11	9	11	Corey Heim (P)	Tricon Garage	Toyota	85	0	Running	30
12	3	98	Ty Majeski (P)	ThorSport Racing	Ford	85	0	Running	29
13	26	52	Stewart Friesen	Halmar Friesen Racing	Toyota	85	1	Running	24
14	7	18	Tyler Ankrum (P)	McAnally-Hilgemann Racing	Chevrolet	85	0	Running	23
15	21	95	Clay Greenfield	GK Racing	Chevrolet	85	0	Running	22
16	25	04	Cory Roper	Roper Racing	Chevrolet	85	0	Running	21
17	28	44	Danny Bohn	Niece Motorsports	Chevrolet	85	0	Running	20
18	29	21	Mason Maggio	Floridian Motorsports	Toyota	85	0	Running	19
19	18	45	Kaden Honeycutt	Niece Motorsports	Chevrolet	85	3	Running	18
20	27	22	Jason White	Reaume Brothers Racing	Ford	85	7	Running	17
21	31	6	Norm Benning	Norm Benning Racing	Chevrolet	85	0	Running	16
22	11	2	Nick Sanchez (P)	Rev Racing	Chevrolet	85	10	Running	15
23	17	88	Matt Crafton	ThorSport Racing	Ford	85	1	Running	14
24	30	25	Dawson Sutton	Rackley WAR	Chevrolet	81	1	Running	13
25	6	77	Chase Purdy	Spire Motorsports	Chevrolet	71	1	Running	12
26	24	28	Keith McGee	FDNY Racing	Chevrolet	70	0	Accident	11
27	1	1	William Sawalich	Tricon Garage	Toyota	64	0	Running	16
28	33	38	Layne Riggs (R)	Front Row Motorsports	Ford	61	0	Accident	10
29	10	13	Jake Garcia	ThorSport Racing	Ford	61	0	Accident	25
30	34	15	Tanner Gray	Tricon Garage	Toyota	61	0	Accident	11
31	8	42	Matt Mills	Niece Motorsports	Chevrolet	61	14	Accident	16
32	14	5	Dean Thompson	Tricon Garage	Toyota	61	0	Accident	16
33	12	7	Connor Zilisch (i)	Spire Motorsports	Chevrolet	61	0	Accident	0
34	36	16	Johnny Sauter	Hattori Racing Enterprises	Toyota	42	0	DVP	3
35	2	99	Ben Rhodes	ThorSport Racing	Ford	38	0	Accident	2
36	32	41	Bayley Currey	Niece Motorsports	Chevrolet	17	0	Rear Gear	1
Official race results

== Standings after the race ==
Drivers' Championship standings

	Pos	Driver	Points
	1	Corey Heim	3,078
	2	Christian Eckes	3,077 (-1)
4	3	Grant Enfinger	3,066 (–12)
1	4	Ty Majeski	3,053 (–25)
	5	Rajah Caruth	3,048 (–30)
2	6	Taylor Gray	3,040 (–38)
3	7	Nick Sanchez	3,033 (–45)
2	8	Tyler Ankrum	3,030 (–48)
	9	Daniel Dye	2,089 (–989)
	10	Ben Rhodes	2,057 (–1,021)
Official driver's standings

Manufacturers' Championship standings

Pos	Manufacturer	Points
1	Chevrolet	745
2	Toyota	703 (-42)
3	Ford	670 (–75)

- Note: Only the first 10 positions are included for the driver standings.

Previous race: 2024 Kubota Tractor 200	NASCAR Craftsman Truck Series; 2024 season	Next race: 2024 Baptist Health 200
