= 2024 Fr8 208 =

2nd race of the 2024 NASCAR Craftsman Truck Series

Race details
- Race 2 of 23 of the 2024 NASCAR Craftsman Truck Series
- Date: February 24, 2024
- Official name: 16th Annual Fr8 208
- Location: Atlanta Motor Speedway in Hampton, Georgia
- Course: Permanent racing facility
- Course length: 1.54 miles (2.48 km)
- Distance: 135 laps, 208 mi (334 km)
- Scheduled distance: 135 laps, 208 mi (334 km)
- Average speed: 111.425 mph (179.321 km/h)

Pole position
Driver	Daniel Dye	McAnally-Hilgemann Racing
- Time: 31.817

Most laps led
Driver	Tyler Ankrum	McAnally-Hilgemann Racing
- Laps: 46

Winner
No. 7	Kyle Busch	Spire Motorsports

Television in the United States
- Network: FS1
- Announcers: Jamie Little, Phil Parsons, and Michael Waltrip

Radio in the United States
- Radio: MRN

The 2024 Fr8 208 was the 2nd stock car race of the 2024 NASCAR Craftsman Truck Series, and the 16th iteration of the event. The race was held on Saturday, February 24, 2024, at Atlanta Motor Speedway in Hampton, Georgia, a 1.54 miles (2.48 km) permanent asphalt quad-oval shaped intermediate speedway (with superspeedway rules). The race took the scheduled 135 laps to complete. Kyle Busch, driving for Spire Motorsports, would make a late race pass for lead on Grant Enfinger with eight laps to go, and held off a charge from Ty Majeski to earn his 65th career NASCAR Craftsman Truck Series win, and his first of the season. It was Busch's 21st consecutive season with a NASCAR national series (Cup, Xfinity, or Truck) Series win. Busch stayed consistent, running in the top ten throughout the entire race and winning the second stage. Tyler Ankrum started second and led a race-high 46 laps. To fill out the podium, Majeski, driving for ThorSport Racing, and Corey Heim, driving for Tricon Garage, would finish 2nd and 3rd, respectively.

== Report ==
=== Background ===
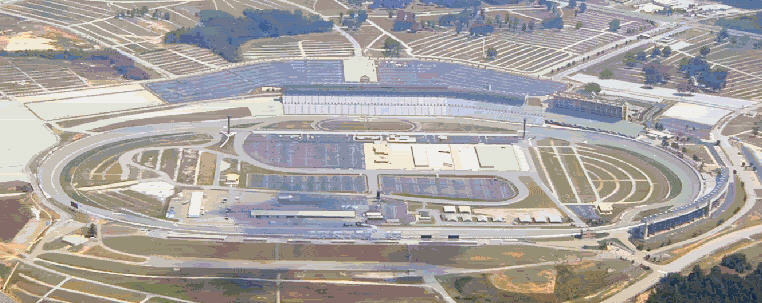
Atlanta Motor Speedway, the circuit where the race was held.

Atlanta Motor Speedway is a 1.54-mile race track in Hampton, Georgia, United States, 20 miles (32 km) south of Atlanta. It has annually hosted NASCAR Craftsman Truck Series stock car races since 2004.

The venue was bought by Speedway Motorsports in 1990. In 1994, 46 condominiums were built over the northeastern side of the track. In 1997, to standardize the track with Speedway Motorsports' other two intermediate ovals, the entire track was almost completely rebuilt. The frontstretch and backstretch were swapped, and the configuration of the track was changed from oval to quad-oval, with a new official length of 1.54-mile (2.48 km) where before it was 1.522-mile (2.449 km). The project made the track one of the fastest on the NASCAR circuit. In July 2021 NASCAR announced that the track would be reprofiled for the 2022 season to have 28 degrees of banking and would be narrowed from 55 to 40 feet which the track claims will turn racing at the track similar to restrictor plate superspeedways. Despite the reprofiling being criticized by drivers, construction began in August 2021 and wrapped up in December 2021. The track has seating capacity of 71,000 to 125,000 people depending on the tracks configuration.

==== Entry list ====
- (R) denotes rookie driver.
- (i) denotes driver who is ineligible for series driver points.

#	Driver	Team	Make
1	Colby Howard	Tricon Garage	Toyota
02	Mason Massey	Young's Motorsports	Chevrolet
2	Nick Sanchez	Rev Racing	Chevrolet
5	Dean Thompson	Tricon Garage	Toyota
7	Kyle Busch (i)	Spire Motorsports	Chevrolet
9	Grant Enfinger	CR7 Motorsports	Chevrolet
11	Corey Heim	Tricon Garage	Toyota
13	Jake Garcia	ThorSport Racing	Ford
15	Tanner Gray	Tricon Garage	Toyota
17	Taylor Gray	Tricon Garage	Toyota
18	Tyler Ankrum	McAnally-Hilgemann Racing	Chevrolet
19	Christian Eckes	McAnally-Hilgemann Racing	Chevrolet
21	Mason Maggio	Floridian Motorsports	Ford
22	Keith McGee	Reaume Brothers Racing	Ford
25	Ty Dillon	Rackley WAR	Chevrolet
32	Bret Holmes	Bret Holmes Racing	Chevrolet
33	Lawless Alan	Reaume Brothers Racing	Ford
38	Layne Riggs (R)	Front Row Motorsports	Ford
41	Bayley Currey	Niece Motorsports	Chevrolet
42	Matt Mills	Niece Motorsports	Chevrolet
43	Daniel Dye	McAnally-Hilgemann Racing	Chevrolet
45	Kaden Honeycutt	Niece Motorsports	Chevrolet
46	Thad Moffitt (R)	Faction46	Chevrolet
52	Stewart Friesen	Halmar Friesen Racing	Toyota
56	Timmy Hill	Hill Motorsports	Toyota
66	Conner Jones (R)	ThorSport Racing	Ford
71	Rajah Caruth	Spire Motorsports	Chevrolet
76	Spencer Boyd	Freedom Racing Enterprises	Chevrolet
77	Chase Purdy	Spire Motorsports	Chevrolet
88	Matt Crafton	ThorSport Racing	Ford
91	Jack Wood	McAnally-Hilgemann Racing	Chevrolet
98	Ty Majeski	ThorSport Racing	Ford
99	Ben Rhodes	ThorSport Racing	Ford
Official entry list

== Qualifying ==
Qualifying was held on Friday, February 23, at 3:05 PM EST.

No free practice session is used in Atlanta because of superspeedway rules. The rules for such circuits involve single-truck qualifying. Each driver has one warmup lap, then participates in one timed lap, and takes the chequered flag. The fastest ten drivers from the first round move on to the second round. Whoever sets the fastest time in Round 2 will win the pole.

Daniel Dye, driving for McAnally-Hilgemann Racing, would advance from the preliminary round and set the fastest time in Round 2, with a lap of 31.817, and a speed of 174.246 mph (280.422 km/h).

No drivers would fail to qualify.

=== Qualifying results ===
Pos.	#	Driver	Team	Make	Time (R1)	Speed (R2)	Time (R2)	Speed (R2)
1	43	Daniel Dye	McAnally-Hilgemann Racing	Chevrolet	32.136	172.517	31.817	174.246
2	18	Tyler Ankrum	McAnally-Hilgemann Racing	Chevrolet	32.115	172.630	31.960	173.467
3	98	Ty Majeski	ThorSport Racing	Ford	32.289	171.699	31.992	173.293
4	91	Jack Wood	McAnally-Hilgemann Racing	Chevrolet	32.318	171.545	32.006	173.218
5	19	Christian Eckes	McAnally-Hilgemann Racing	Chevrolet	32.106	172.678	32.066	172.893
6	9	Grant Enfinger	CR7 Motorsports	Chevrolet	32.201	172.169	32.076	172.840
7	7	Kyle Busch (i)	Spire Motorsports	Chevrolet	32.215	172.094	32.123	172.587
8	88	Matt Crafton	ThorSport Racing	Ford	32.209	172.126	32.134	172.528
9	77	Chase Purdy	Spire Motorsports	Chevrolet	32.371	171.264	32.219	172.072
10	66	Conner Jones (R)	ThorSport Racing	Ford	32.367	171.286	32.314	171.567
Eliminated in Round 1
11	13	Jake Garcia	ThorSport Racing	Ford	32.372	171.259	—	—
12	71	Rajah Caruth	Spire Motorsports	Chevrolet	32.379	171.222	—	—
13	38	Layne Riggs (R)	Front Row Motorsports	Ford	32.400	171.111	—	—
14	99	Ben Rhodes	ThorSport Racing	Ford	32.420	171.006	—	—
15	1	Colby Howard	Tricon Garage	Toyota	32.494	170.616	—	—
16	52	Stewart Friesen	Halmar Friesen Racing	Toyota	32.495	170.611	—	—
17	25	Ty Dillon	Rackley WAR	Chevrolet	32.503	170.569	—	—
18	2	Nick Sanchez	Rev Racing	Chevrolet	32.519	170.485	—	—
19	11	Corey Heim	Tricon Garage	Toyota	32.531	170.422	—	—
20	41	Bayley Currey	Niece Motorsports	Chevrolet	32.582	170.155	—	—
21	42	Matt Mills	Niece Motorsports	Chevrolet	32.628	169.915	—	—
22	15	Tanner Gray	Tricon Garage	Toyota	32.640	169.853	—	—
23	5	Dean Thompson	Tricon Garage	Toyota	32.648	169.811	—	—
24	32	Bret Holmes	Bret Holmes Racing	Chevrolet	32.661	169.744	—	—
25	45	Kaden Honeycutt	Niece Motorsports	Chevrolet	32.721	169.432	—	—
26	21	Mason Maggio	Floridian Motorsports	Ford	32.745	169.308	—	—
27	56	Timmy Hill	Hill Motorsports	Toyota	32.750	169.282	—	—
28	46	Thad Moffitt (R)	Faction46	Chevrolet	32.804	169.004	—	—
29	33	Lawless Alan	Reaume Brothers Racing	Ford	32.824	168.901	—	—
30	02	Mason Massey	Young's Motorsports	Chevrolet	32.849	168.772	—	—
31	17	Taylor Gray	Tricon Garage	Toyota	32.884	168.593	—	—
Qualified by owner's points
32	22	Keith McGee	Reaume Brothers Racing	Ford	32.910	168.459	—	—
33	76	Spencer Boyd	Freedom Racing Enterprises	Chevrolet	32.953	168.240	—	—
Official qualifying results
Official starting lineup

== Race results ==
Stage 1 Laps: 30

Pos.	#	Driver	Team	Make	Pts
1	19	Christian Eckes	McAnally-Hilgemann Racing	Chevrolet	10
2	18	Tyler Ankrum	McAnally-Hilgemann Racing	Chevrolet	9
3	38	Layne Riggs (R)	Front Row Motorsports	Ford	8
4	9	Grant Enfinger	CR7 Motorsports	Chevrolet	7
5	98	Ty Majeski	ThorSport Racing	Ford	6
6	99	Ben Rhodes	ThorSport Racing	Ford	5
7	13	Jake Garcia	ThorSport Racing	Ford	4
8	7	Kyle Busch (i)	Spire Motorsports	Chevrolet	0
9	91	Jack Wood	McAnally-Hilgemann Racing	Chevrolet	2
10	43	Daniel Dye	McAnally-Hilgemann Racing	Chevrolet	1

Stage 2 Laps: 30

Pos.	#	Driver	Team	Make	Pts
1	7	Kyle Busch (i)	Spire Motorsports	Chevrolet	0
2	18	Tyler Ankrum	McAnally-Hilgemann Racing	Chevrolet	9
3	9	Grant Enfinger	CR7 Motorsports	Chevrolet	8
4	15	Tanner Gray	Tricon Garage	Toyota	7
5	11	Corey Heim	Tricon Garage	Toyota	6
6	2	Nick Sanchez	Rev Racing	Chevrolet	5
7	98	Ty Majeski	ThorSport Racing	Ford	4
8	71	Rajah Caruth	Spire Motorsports	Chevrolet	3
9	17	Taylor Gray	Tricon Garage	Toyota	2
10	41	Bayley Currey	Niece Motorsports	Chevrolet	1

Stage 3 Laps: 75

Fin	St	#	Driver	Team	Make	Laps	Led	Status	Pts
1	7	7	Kyle Busch (i)	Spire Motorsports	Chevrolet	135	33	Running	0
2	3	98	Ty Majeski	ThorSport Racing	Ford	135	3	Running	45
3	19	11	Corey Heim	Tricon Garage	Toyota	135	0	Running	40
4	31	17	Taylor Gray	Tricon Garage	Toyota	135	0	Running	35
5	18	2	Nick Sanchez	Rev Racing	Chevrolet	135	0	Running	37
6	25	45	Kaden Honeycutt	Niece Motorsports	Chevrolet	135	0	Running	31
7	2	18	Tyler Ankrum	McAnally-Hilgemann Racing	Chevrolet	135	46	Running	48
8	12	71	Rajah Caruth	Spire Motorsports	Chevrolet	135	0	Running	32
9	1	43	Daniel Dye	McAnally-Hilgemann Racing	Chevrolet	135	0	Running	29
10	23	5	Dean Thompson	Tricon Garage	Toyota	135	4	Running	27
11	24	32	Bret Holmes	Bret Holmes Racing	Chevrolet	135	0	Running	26
12	29	33	Lawless Alan	Reaume Brothers Racing	Ford	135	0	Running	25
13	8	88	Matt Crafton	ThorSport Racing	Ford	135	0	Running	24
14	17	25	Ty Dillon	Rackley WAR	Chevrolet	135	0	Running	23
15	9	77	Chase Purdy	Spire Motorsports	Chevrolet	135	0	Running	22
16	11	13	Jake Garcia	ThorSport Racing	Ford	135	0	Running	21
17	15	1	Colby Howard	Tricon Garage	Toyota	135	0	Running	20
18	27	56	Timmy Hill	Hill Motorsports	Toyota	135	0	Running	19
19	22	15	Tanner Gray	Tricon Garage	Toyota	135	0	Running	25
20	30	02	Mason Massey	Young's Motorsports	Chevrolet	135	0	Running	17
21	32	22	Keith McGee	Reaume Brothers Racing	Ford	134	0	Running	16
22	33	76	Spencer Boyd	Freedom Racing Enterprises	Chevrolet	134	0	Running	15
23	16	52	Stewart Friesen	Halmar Friesen Racing	Toyota	133	0	Running	14
24	26	21	Mason Maggio	Floridian Motorsports	Ford	133	0	Running	12
25	6	9	Grant Enfinger	CR7 Motorsports	Chevrolet	133	23	Running	26
26	28	46	Thad Moffitt (R)	Faction46	Chevrolet	132	0	Running	10
27	21	42	Matt Mills	Niece Motorsports	Chevrolet	132	6	Running	9
28	14	99	Ben Rhodes	ThorSport Racing	Ford	130	0	Running	13
29	10	66	Conner Jones (R)	ThorSport Racing	Ford	129	0	Running	7
30	20	41	Bayley Currey	Niece Motorsports	Chevrolet	96	0	Damage	7
31	4	91	Jack Wood	McAnally-Hilgemann Racing	Chevrolet	57	0	Accident	7
32	5	19	Christian Eckes	McAnally-Hilgemann Racing	Chevrolet	50	20	Brakes	14
33	13	38	Layne Riggs (R)	Front Row Motorsports	Ford	133	0	Running	4
Official race results

== Standings after the race ==
Drivers' Championship standings

	Pos	Driver	Points
	1	Tyler Ankrum	91
5	2	Ty Majeski	81 (-10)
1	3	Nick Sanchez	79 (–12)
2	4	Corey Heim	77 (–14)
3	5	Rajah Caruth	66 (–25)
2	6	Bret Holmes	64 (–27)
2	7	Matt Crafton	62 (–29)
7	8	Taylor Gray	59 (–32)
6	9	Christian Eckes	54 (–37)
9	10	Daniel Dye	53 (–38)
Official driver's standings

Manufacturers' Championship standings

Pos	Manufacturer	Points
1	Chevrolet	80
2	Toyota	68 (–12)
3	Ford	64 (–16)

- Note: Only the first 10 positions are included for the driver standings.

Previous race: 2024 Fresh From Florida 250	NASCAR Craftsman Truck Series; 2024 season	Next race: 2024 Victoria's Voice Foundation 200
