= 2021 ToyotaCare 250 =

Race details
- Race 6 of 22 of the 2021 NASCAR Camping World Truck Series
- Date: April 17, 2021
- Official name: ToyotaCare 250
- Location: Richmond, Virginia, Richmond Raceway
- Course: Permanent racing facility
- Course length: 0.75 miles (1.207 km)
- Distance: 250 laps, 187.5 mi (301.752 km)
- Average speed: 77.072 miles per hour (124.035 km/h)

Pole position
Driver	Ben Rhodes	ThorSport Racing
- Grid positions set by competition-based formula

Most laps led
Driver	John Hunter Nemechek	Kyle Busch Motorsports
- Laps: 114

Winner
No. 4	John Hunter Nemechek	Kyle Busch Motorsports

Television in the United States
- Network: Fox Sports 1
- Announcers: Vince Welch and Michael Waltrip

Radio in the United States
- Radio: Motor Racing Network

The 2021 ToyotaCare 250 was the 6th stock car race of the 2021 NASCAR Camping World Truck Series, and the 13th iteration of the event. The race was held on Saturday, April 17, 2021 in Richmond, Virginia at Richmond Raceway, a 0.75 miles (1.21 km) permanent D-shaped oval. The race took 250 laps to complete. John Hunter Nemechek of Kyle Busch Motorsports would win the race, his 8th overall career win and his 2nd of the season. Kyle Busch of Kyle Busch Motorsports and Tyler Ankrum of GMS Racing would score the rest of the podium positions, finishing 2nd and 3rd, respectively.

Two drivers would debut in the Truck Series for this race: Howie DiSavino III and Keith McGee. After two years from being absent from NASCAR, Ryan Reed would return to NASCAR after he was signed to drive the #49 CMI Motorsports truck, to help lock the team in races based on owner's points.

== Background ==
#	Driver	Team	Make
1	Hailie Deegan	David Gilliland Racing	Ford
2	Sheldon Creed	GMS Racing	Chevrolet
02	Kris Wright	Young's Motorsports	Chevrolet
3	Howie DiSavino III	Jordan Anderson Racing	Chevrolet
4	John Hunter Nemechek	Kyle Busch Motorsports	Toyota
04	Cory Roper	Roper Racing	Ford
6	Norm Benning	Norm Benning Racing	Chevrolet
9	Codie Rohrbaugh	CR7 Motorsports	Chevrolet
10	Jennifer Jo Cobb	Jennifer Jo Cobb Racing	Chevrolet
11	Spencer Davis	Spencer Davis Motorsports	Toyota
12	Tate Fogleman	Young's Motorsports	Chevrolet
13	Johnny Sauter	ThorSport Racing	Toyota
14	Trey Hutchens	Trey Hutchens Racing	Chevrolet
15	Tanner Gray	David Gilliland Racing	Ford
16	Austin Hill	Hattori Racing Enterprises	Toyota
18	Chandler Smith	Kyle Busch Motorsports	Toyota
19	Derek Kraus	McAnally–Hilgemann Racing	Toyota
20	Spencer Boyd	Young's Motorsports	Chevrolet
21	Zane Smith	GMS Racing	Chevrolet
22	Austin Wayne Self	AM Racing	Chevrolet
23	Chase Purdy	GMS Racing	Chevrolet
24	Raphaël Lessard	GMS Racing	Chevrolet
25	Timothy Peters	Rackley W.A.R.	Chevrolet
26	Tyler Ankrum	GMS Racing	Chevrolet
30	Danny Bohn	On Point Motorsports	Toyota
32	Sam Mayer	Bret Holmes Racing	Chevrolet
33	Keith McGee	Reaume Brothers Racing	Chevrolet
34	Josh Reaume	Reaume Brothers Racing	Toyota
38	Todd Gilliland	Front Row Motorsports	Ford
40	Ryan Truex	Niece Motorsports	Chevrolet
41	Dawson Cram	Cram Racing Enterprises	Chevrolet
42	Carson Hocevar	Niece Motorsports	Chevrolet
44	Jett Noland	Niece Motorsports	Chevrolet
45	Brett Moffitt	Niece Motorsports	Chevrolet
49	Ray Ciccarelli*	CMI Motorsports	Chevrolet
51	Kyle Busch	Kyle Busch Motorsports	Toyota
52	Stewart Friesen	Halmar Friesen Racing	Toyota
56	Timmy Hill	Hill Motorsports	Chevrolet
88	Matt Crafton	ThorSport Racing	Toyota
98	Grant Enfinger	ThorSport Racing	Toyota
99	Ben Rhodes	ThorSport Racing	Toyota
Official entry list

== Starting lineup ==
Qualifying was determined by a formula based on the previous race, the 2021 Pinty's Truck Race on Dirt. As a result, Ben Rhodes of ThorSport Racing would win the pole.

Trey Hutchens would be the only driver not to qualify.

Pos.	#	Driver	Team	Make
1	99	Ben Rhodes	ThorSport Racing	Toyota
2	16	Austin Hill	Hattori Racing Enterprises	Toyota
3	98	Grant Enfinger	ThorSport Racing	Toyota
4	52	Stewart Friesen	Halmar Friesen Racing	Toyota
5	24	Raphaël Lessard	GMS Racing	Chevrolet
6	21	Zane Smith	GMS Racing	Chevrolet
7	88	Matt Crafton	ThorSport Racing	Toyota
8	38	Todd Gilliland	Front Row Motorsports	Ford
9	2	Sheldon Creed	GMS Racing	Chevrolet
10	22	Austin Wayne Self	AM Racing	Chevrolet
11	15	Tanner Gray	David Gilliland Racing	Ford
12	51	Kyle Busch	Kyle Busch Motorsports	Toyota
13	42	Carson Hocevar	Niece Motorsports	Chevrolet
14	1	Hailie Deegan	David Gilliland Racing	Ford
15	23	Chase Purdy	GMS Racing	Chevrolet
16	40	Ryan Truex	Niece Motorsports	Chevrolet
17	45	Brett Moffitt	Niece Motorsports	Chevrolet
18	4	John Hunter Nemechek	Kyle Busch Motorsports	Toyota
19	13	Johnny Sauter	ThorSport Racing	Toyota
20	9	Codie Rohrbaugh	CR7 Motorsports	Chevrolet
21	04	Cory Roper	Roper Racing	Ford
22	02	Kris Wright	Young's Motorsports	Chevrolet
23	18	Chandler Smith	Kyle Busch Motorsports	Toyota
24	12	Tate Fogleman	Young's Motorsports	Chevrolet
25	11	Spencer Davis	Spencer Davis Motorsports	Toyota
26	20	Spencer Boyd	Young's Motorsports	Chevrolet
27	25	Timothy Peters	Rackley W.A.R.	Chevrolet
28	30	Danny Bohn	On Point Motorsports	Toyota
29	19	Derek Kraus	McAnally–Hilgemann Racing	Toyota
30	26	Tyler Ankrum	GMS Racing	Chevrolet
31	41	Dawson Cram	Cram Racing Enterprises	Chevrolet
32	33	Keith McGee	Reaume Brothers Racing	Chevrolet
33	10	Jennifer Jo Cobb	Jennifer Jo Cobb Racing	Chevrolet
34	56	Timmy Hill	Hill Motorsports	Chevrolet
35	3	Howie DiSavino III	Jordan Anderson Racing	Chevrolet
36	44	Jett Noland	Niece Motorsports	Chevrolet
37	34	Josh Reaume	Reaume Brothers Racing	Toyota
38	6	Norm Benning	Norm Benning Racing	Chevrolet
39	49	Ryan Reed	CMI Motorsports	Chevrolet
40	32	Sam Mayer	Bret Holmes Racing	Chevrolet
Failed to qualify
41	14	Trey Hutchens	Trey Hutchens Racing	Chevrolet
Official starting lineup

== Race results ==
Stage 1 Laps: 70

Fin	#	Driver	Team	Make	Pts
1	98	Grant Enfinger	ThorSport Racing	Toyota	10
2	4	John Hunter Nemechek	Kyle Busch Motorsports	Toyota	9
3	51	Kyle Busch	Kyle Busch Motorsports	Toyota	0
4	99	Ben Rhodes	ThorSport Racing	Toyota	7
5	16	Austin Hill	Hattori Racing Enterprises	Toyota	6
6	42	Carson Hocevar	Niece Motorsports	Chevrolet	5
7	24	Raphaël Lessard	GMS Racing	Chevrolet	4
8	38	Todd Gilliland	Front Row Motorsports	Ford	3
9	19	Derek Kraus	McAnally–Hilgemann Racing	Toyota	2
10	52	Stewart Friesen	Halmar Friesen Racing	Toyota	1

Stage 2 Laps: 70

Fin	#	Driver	Team	Make	Pts
1	4	John Hunter Nemechek	Kyle Busch Motorsports	Toyota	10
2	98	Grant Enfinger	ThorSport Racing	Toyota	9
3	99	Ben Rhodes	ThorSport Racing	Toyota	8
4	16	Austin Hill	Hattori Racing Enterprises	Toyota	7
5	51	Kyle Busch	Kyle Busch Motorsports	Toyota	0
6	21	Zane Smith	GMS Racing	Chevrolet	5
7	24	Raphaël Lessard	GMS Racing	Chevrolet	4
8	38	Todd Gilliland	Front Row Motorsports	Ford	3
9	19	Derek Kraus	McAnally–Hilgemann Racing	Toyota	2
10	18	Chandler Smith	Kyle Busch Motorsports	Toyota	1

Stage 3 Laps: 110

Fin	St	#	Driver	Team	Make	Laps	Led	Status	Pts
1	18	4	John Hunter Nemechek	Kyle Busch Motorsports	Toyota	250	114	running	59
2	12	51	Kyle Busch	Kyle Busch Motorsports	Toyota	250	26	running	0
3	30	26	Tyler Ankrum	GMS Racing	Chevrolet	250	0	running	34
4	23	18	Chandler Smith	Kyle Busch Motorsports	Toyota	250	24	running	34
5	19	13	Johnny Sauter	ThorSport Racing	Toyota	250	0	running	32
6	8	38	Todd Gilliland	Front Row Motorsports	Ford	250	0	running	37
7	1	99	Ben Rhodes	ThorSport Racing	Toyota	250	4	running	45
8	3	98	Grant Enfinger	ThorSport Racing	Toyota	250	71	running	48
9	40	32	Sam Mayer	Bret Holmes Racing	Chevrolet	250	0	running	0
10	2	16	Austin Hill	Hattori Racing Enterprises	Toyota	250	0	running	40
11	9	2	Sheldon Creed	GMS Racing	Chevrolet	250	0	running	26
12	13	42	Carson Hocevar	Niece Motorsports	Chevrolet	250	0	running	30
13	4	52	Stewart Friesen	Halmar Friesen Racing	Toyota	250	0	running	25
14	6	21	Zane Smith	GMS Racing	Chevrolet	250	0	running	28
15	29	19	Derek Kraus	McAnally–Hilgemann Racing	Toyota	250	0	running	26
16	25	11	Spencer Davis	Spencer Davis Motorsports	Toyota	250	0	running	21
17	14	1	Hailie Deegan	David Gilliland Racing	Ford	250	0	running	20
18	7	88	Matt Crafton	ThorSport Racing	Toyota	250	11	running	19
19	10	22	Austin Wayne Self	AM Racing	Chevrolet	250	0	running	18
20	28	30	Danny Bohn	On Point Motorsports	Toyota	250	0	running	17
21	34	56	Timmy Hill	Hill Motorsports	Chevrolet	250	0	running	0
22	27	25	Timothy Peters	Rackley W.A.R.	Chevrolet	250	0	running	15
23	5	24	Raphaël Lessard	GMS Racing	Chevrolet	249	0	running	22
24	11	15	Tanner Gray	David Gilliland Racing	Ford	249	0	running	13
25	31	41	Dawson Cram	Cram Racing Enterprises	Chevrolet	248	0	running	12
26	36	44	Jett Noland	Niece Motorsports	Chevrolet	247	0	running	11
27	26	20	Spencer Boyd	Young's Motorsports	Chevrolet	247	0	running	10
28	15	23	Chase Purdy	GMS Racing	Chevrolet	245	0	running	9
29	39	49	Ryan Reed	CMI Motorsports	Chevrolet	245	0	running	8
30	32	33	Keith McGee	Reaume Brothers Racing	Chevrolet	244	0	running	7
31	21	04	Cory Roper	Roper Racing	Ford	243	0	running	6
32	38	6	Norm Benning	Norm Benning Racing	Chevrolet	240	0	running	5
33	37	34	Josh Reaume	Reaume Brothers Racing	Toyota	240	0	running	4
34	35	3	Howie DiSavino III	Jordan Anderson Racing	Chevrolet	221	0	running	3
35	22	02	Kris Wright	Young's Motorsports	Chevrolet	212	0	accident	2
36	20	9	Codie Rohrbaugh	CR7 Motorsports	Chevrolet	195	0	accident	1
37	17	45	Brett Moffitt	Niece Motorsports	Chevrolet	186	0	handling	1
38	33	10	Jennifer Jo Cobb	Jennifer Jo Cobb Racing	Chevrolet	168	0	dvp	1
39	24	12	Tate Fogleman	Young's Motorsports	Chevrolet	82	0	accident	1
40	16	40	Ryan Truex	Niece Motorsports	Chevrolet	44	0	rear gear	1
Official race results

Previous race: 2021 Pinty's Truck Race on Dirt	NASCAR Camping World Truck Series; 2021 season	Next race: 2021 WISE Power 200
