= 2021 North Carolina Education Lottery 200 =

Race details
- Race 10 of 22 of the 2021 NASCAR Camping World Truck Series
- Date: May 28, 2021
- Official name: North Carolina Education Lottery 200
- Location: Concord, North Carolina, Charlotte Motor Speedway
- Course: Permanent racing facility
- Course length: 1.5 miles (2.414 km)
- Distance: 134 laps, 201 mi (323.478 km)
- Average speed: 114.331 miles per hour (183.998 km/h)

Pole position
Driver	Todd Gilliland	Front Row Motorsports
- Time: N/A

Most laps led
Driver	John Hunter Nemechek	Kyle Busch Motorsports
- Laps: 71

Winner
No. 4	John Hunter Nemechek	Kyle Busch Motorsports

Television in the United States
- Network: Fox Sports 1
- Announcers: Vince Welch, Michael Waltrip

Radio in the United States
- Radio: Motor Racing Network

The 2021 North Carolina Education Lottery 200 was the 10th stock car race of the 2021 NASCAR Camping World Truck Series and the 19th iteration of the event. The race was held on Friday, May 28, 2021 in Concord, North Carolina at Charlotte Motor Speedway, a 1.5 miles (2.4 km) permanent quad-oval. John Hunter Nemechek of Kyle Busch Motorsports would win his third race of the year and his 9th of his career. Carson Hocevar of Niece Motorsports and Ben Rhodes of ThorSport Racing would finish in the rest of the podium positions, taking 2nd and 3rd, respectfully.

The race was marred by a late race crash including Trey Hutchens, Johnny Sauter, and Drew Dollar. Coming into Turn 3, Hutchens would blow a tire and was slow on the track- crucially, he could not get to pit road, and was stuck on the frontstretch, meaning he could not get to pit road for an extremely long time, or until the caution came out. Sauter and Dollar were in a battle for position coming off Turn 4 when Sauter, who could not see Hutchens, slammed the back side of Hutchens car with the right side of his, causing both cars to be destroyed in the incident. Dollar would also be involved, but was able to continue. The crash would lead to major controversy, with critics saying that NASCAR should have noticed Hutchens' car on track being slow, and that the caution should have been put out.

== Background ==
The layout of Charlotte Motor Speedway, the venue where the race was held.

The race was held at Charlotte Motor Speedway, located in Concord, North Carolina. The speedway complex includes a 1.5-mile (2.4 km) quad-oval track that was utilized for the race, as well as a dragstrip and a dirt track. The speedway was built in 1959 by Bruton Smith and is considered the home track for NASCAR with many race teams based in the Charlotte metropolitan area. The track is owned and operated by Speedway Motorsports Inc. (SMI) with Marcus Smith serving as track president.

=== Entry list ===
#	Driver	Team	Make
1	Hailie Deegan	David Gilliland Racing	Ford
2	Sheldon Creed	GMS Racing	Chevrolet
02	Kris Wright	Young's Motorsports	Chevrolet
3	Keith McGee	Jordan Anderson Racing	Chevrolet
4	John Hunter Nemechek	Kyle Busch Motorsports	Toyota
04	Cory Roper	Roper Racing	Ford
9	Grant Enfinger	CR7 Motorsports	Chevrolet
10	Jennifer Jo Cobb	Jennifer Jo Cobb Racing	Ford
12	Tate Fogleman	Young's Motorsports	Chevrolet
13	Johnny Sauter	ThorSport Racing	Toyota
14	Trey Hutchens	Trey Hutchens Racing	Chevrolet
15	Tanner Gray	David Gilliland Racing	Ford
16	Austin Hill	Hattori Racing Enterprises	Toyota
18	Chandler Smith	Kyle Busch Motorsports	Toyota
19	Derek Kraus	McAnally–Hilgemann Racing	Toyota
20	Spencer Boyd	Young's Motorsports	Chevrolet
21	Zane Smith	GMS Racing	Chevrolet
22	Austin Wayne Self	AM Racing	Chevrolet
23	Chase Purdy	GMS Racing	Chevrolet
24	Jack Wood	GMS Racing	Chevrolet
25	Timothy Peters	Rackley W.A.R.	Chevrolet
26	Tyler Ankrum	GMS Racing	Chevrolet
30	Danny Bohn	On Point Motorsports	Toyota
32	Bret Holmes	Bret Holmes Racing	Chevrolet
33	Akinori Ogata	Reaume Brothers Racing	Chevrolet
34	C. J. McLaughlin	Reaume Brothers Racing	Toyota
38	Todd Gilliland	Front Row Motorsports	Ford
40	Ryan Truex	Niece Motorsports	Chevrolet
41	Dawson Cram	Cram Racing Enterprises	Chevrolet
42	Carson Hocevar	Niece Motorsports	Chevrolet
45	Bayley Currey	Niece Motorsports	Chevrolet
51	Drew Dollar	Kyle Busch Motorsports	Toyota
52	Stewart Friesen	Halmar Friesen Racing	Toyota
56	Timmy Hill	Hill Motorsports	Chevrolet
66	Ty Majeski	ThorSport Racing	Toyota
88	Matt Crafton	ThorSport Racing	Toyota
98	Christian Eckes	ThorSport Racing	Toyota
99	Ben Rhodes	ThorSport Racing	Toyota
Official entry list

== Practice ==
The first and final practice would take place on May 28, 2021 at 12:34 PM EST. Austin Hill of Hattori Racing Enterprises would set the fastest time, with a 30.391 and an average speed of 177.684 miles per hour (285.955 km/h).

The practice had numerous incidents occur, including incidents with Drew Dollar, Danny Bohn, Timothy Peters, C. J. McLaughlin, and Akinori Ogata.

Pos.	#	Driver	Team	Make	Time	Speed
1	16	Austin Hill	Hattori Racing Enterprises	Toyota	30.391	177.684
2	4	John Hunter Nemechek	Kyle Busch Motorsports	Toyota	30.408	177.585
3	42	Carson Hocevar	Niece Motorsports	Chevrolet	30.409	177.579
Full practice results

== Starting lineup ==
Qualifying was to be originally held on Friday, May 28 after practice- however, rain would fall on the track, and qualifying was canceled. Therefore, NASCAR reverted to the metric system they had been using- a formula based on the previous race, this being the 2021 Toyota Tundra 225. As a result, Todd Gilliland of Front Row Motorsports would win the pole.

Pos.	#	Driver	Team	Make
1	38	Todd Gilliland	Front Row Motorsports	Ford
2	2	Sheldon Creed	GMS Racing	Chevrolet
3	16	Austin Hill	Hattori Racing Enterprises	Toyota
4	4	John Hunter Nemechek	Kyle Busch Motorsports	Toyota
5	99	Ben Rhodes	ThorSport Racing	Toyota
6	21	Zane Smith	GMS Racing	Chevrolet
7	26	Tyler Ankrum	GMS Racing	Chevrolet
8	9	Grant Enfinger	CR7 Motorsports	Chevrolet
9	42	Carson Hocevar	Niece Motorsports	Chevrolet
10	88	Matt Crafton	ThorSport Racing	Toyota
11	52	Stewart Friesen	Halmar Friesen Racing	Toyota
12	1	Hailie Deegan	David Gilliland Racing	Ford
13	22	Austin Wayne Self	AM Racing	Chevrolet
14	13	Johnny Sauter	ThorSport Racing	Toyota
15	19	Derek Kraus	McAnally–Hilgemann Racing	Toyota
16	40	Ryan Truex	Niece Motorsports	Chevrolet
17	51	Drew Dollar	Kyle Busch Motorsports	Toyota
18	56	Timmy Hill	Hill Motorsports	Chevrolet
19	45	Bayley Currey	Niece Motorsports	Chevrolet
20	24	Jack Wood	GMS Racing	Chevrolet
21	02	Kris Wright	Young's Motorsports	Chevrolet
22	98	Christian Eckes	ThorSport Racing	Toyota
23	18	Chandler Smith	Kyle Busch Motorsports	Toyota
24	12	Tate Fogleman	Young's Motorsports	Chevrolet
25	15	Tanner Gray	David Gilliland Racing	Ford
26	23	Chase Purdy	GMS Racing	Chevrolet
27	04	Cory Roper	Roper Racing	Ford
28	32	Bret Holmes	Bret Holmes Racing	Chevrolet
29	25	Timothy Peters	Rackley W.A.R.	Chevrolet
30	34	C. J. McLaughlin	Reaume Brothers Racing	Toyota
31	66	Ty Majeski	ThorSport Racing	Toyota
32	30	Danny Bohn	On Point Motorsports	Toyota
33	3	Keith McGee	Jordan Anderson Racing	Chevrolet
34	33	Akinori Ogata	Reaume Brothers Racing	Chevrolet
35	20	Spencer Boyd	Young's Motorsports	Chevrolet
36	41	Dawson Cram	Cram Racing Enterprises	Chevrolet
37	10	Jennifer Jo Cobb	Jennifer Jo Cobb Racing	Ford
38	14	Trey Hutchens	Trey Hutchens Racing	Chevrolet
Withdrew
WD	11	Spencer Davis	Spencer Davis Motorsports	Toyota
WD	49	Ray Ciccarelli	CMI Motorsports	Ford
Official starting lineup

== Race ==
=== Post-race driver comments ===
Following the lap 116 wreck, Hutchens spoke to the media, looking visibly shakened. He would report that "I cut a tire getting into (Turn) 3 and tried to slow down to get to pit road and the hole closed up, so I ended up slow down the frontstretch and (Sauter) just ran into the back of us. ... They were coming pretty hard. They probably needed to throw the yellow a little sooner.”

== Race results ==
Stage 1 Laps: 30

Fin	#	Driver	Team	Make	Pts
1	2	Sheldon Creed	GMS Racing	Chevrolet	10
2	38	Todd Gilliland	Front Row Motorsports	Ford	9
3	4	John Hunter Nemechek	Kyle Busch Motorsports	Toyota	8
4	16	Austin Hill	Hattori Racing Enterprises	Toyota	7
5	21	Zane Smith	GMS Racing	Chevrolet	6
6	26	Tyler Ankrum	GMS Racing	Chevrolet	5
7	19	Derek Kraus	McAnally–Hilgemann Racing	Toyota	4
8	88	Matt Crafton	ThorSport Racing	Toyota	3
9	99	Ben Rhodes	ThorSport Racing	Toyota	2
10	1	Hailie Deegan	David Gilliland Racing	Ford	1

Stage 2 Laps: 30

Fin	#	Driver	Team	Make	Pts
1	21	Zane Smith	GMS Racing	Chevrolet	10
2	16	Austin Hill	Hattori Racing Enterprises	Toyota	9
3	66	Ty Majeski	ThorSport Racing	Toyota	8
4	19	Derek Kraus	McAnally–Hilgemann Racing	Toyota	7
5	40	Ryan Truex	Niece Motorsports	Chevrolet	6
6	88	Matt Crafton	ThorSport Racing	Toyota	5
7	42	Carson Hocevar	Niece Motorsports	Chevrolet	4
8	52	Stewart Friesen	Halmar Friesen Racing	Toyota	3
9	9	Grant Enfinger	CR7 Motorsports	Chevrolet	2
10	4	John Hunter Nemechek	Kyle Busch Motorsports	Toyota	1

Stage 3 Laps: 74

Fin	St	#	Driver	Team	Make	Laps	Led	Status	Pts
1	4	4	John Hunter Nemechek	Kyle Busch Motorsports	Toyota	134	71	running	49
2	9	42	Carson Hocevar	Niece Motorsports	Chevrolet	134	5	running	39
3	5	99	Ben Rhodes	ThorSport Racing	Toyota	134	0	running	36
4	11	52	Stewart Friesen	Halmar Friesen Racing	Toyota	134	1	running	36
5	1	38	Todd Gilliland	Front Row Motorsports	Ford	134	5	running	41
6	23	18	Chandler Smith	Kyle Busch Motorsports	Toyota	134	0	running	31
7	31	66	Ty Majeski	ThorSport Racing	Toyota	134	0	running	38
8	15	19	Derek Kraus	McAnally–Hilgemann Racing	Toyota	134	0	running	40
9	3	16	Austin Hill	Hattori Racing Enterprises	Toyota	134	0	running	44
10	6	21	Zane Smith	GMS Racing	Chevrolet	134	13	running	43
11	22	98	Christian Eckes	ThorSport Racing	Toyota	134	3	running	26
12	16	40	Ryan Truex	Niece Motorsports	Chevrolet	134	1	running	31
13	12	1	Hailie Deegan	David Gilliland Racing	Ford	133	0	running	25
14	8	9	Grant Enfinger	CR7 Motorsports	Chevrolet	133	0	running	25
15	20	24	Jack Wood	GMS Racing	Chevrolet	133	0	running	22
16	7	26	Tyler Ankrum	GMS Racing	Chevrolet	133	2	running	26
17	13	22	Austin Wayne Self	AM Racing	Chevrolet	133	0	running	20
18	18	56	Timmy Hill	Hill Motorsports	Chevrolet	133	0	running	19
19	19	45	Bayley Currey	Niece Motorsports	Chevrolet	133	0	running	18
20	17	51	Drew Dollar	Kyle Busch Motorsports	Toyota	133	0	running	17
21	36	41	Dawson Cram	Cram Racing Enterprises	Chevrolet	133	0	running	16
22	25	15	Tanner Gray	David Gilliland Racing	Ford	133	0	running	15
23	21	02	Kris Wright	Young's Motorsports	Chevrolet	132	0	running	14
24	32	30	Danny Bohn	On Point Motorsports	Toyota	131	0	running	13
25	27	04	Cory Roper	Roper Racing	Ford	129	0	running	12
26	35	20	Spencer Boyd	Young's Motorsports	Chevrolet	128	0	running	11
27	30	34	C. J. McLaughlin	Reaume Brothers Racing	Toyota	127	0	running	10
28	34	33	Akinori Ogata	Reaume Brothers Racing	Chevrolet	125	0	running	9
29	33	3	Keith McGee	Jordan Anderson Racing	Chevrolet	123	0	running	8
30	10	88	Matt Crafton	ThorSport Racing	Toyota	114	0	engine	15
31	14	13	Johnny Sauter	ThorSport Racing	Toyota	111	0	crash	6
32	38	14	Trey Hutchens	Trey Hutchens Racing	Chevrolet	108	0	crash	5
33	37	10	Jennifer Jo Cobb	Jennifer Jo Cobb Racing	Ford	71	0	suspension	4
34	26	23	Chase Purdy	GMS Racing	Chevrolet	59	0	dvp	3
35	2	2	Sheldon Creed	GMS Racing	Chevrolet	55	33	crash	12
36	28	32	Bret Holmes	Bret Holmes Racing	Chevrolet	49	0	crash	1
37	24	12	Tate Fogleman	Young's Motorsports	Chevrolet	38	0	rear gear	1
38	29	25	Timothy Peters	Rackley W.A.R.	Chevrolet	13	0	steering	1
Official race results

Previous race: 2021 Toyota Tundra 225	NASCAR Camping World Truck Series; 2021 season	Next race: 2021 SpeedyCash.com 220
