= Cory Roper =

American racing driver (born 1977)

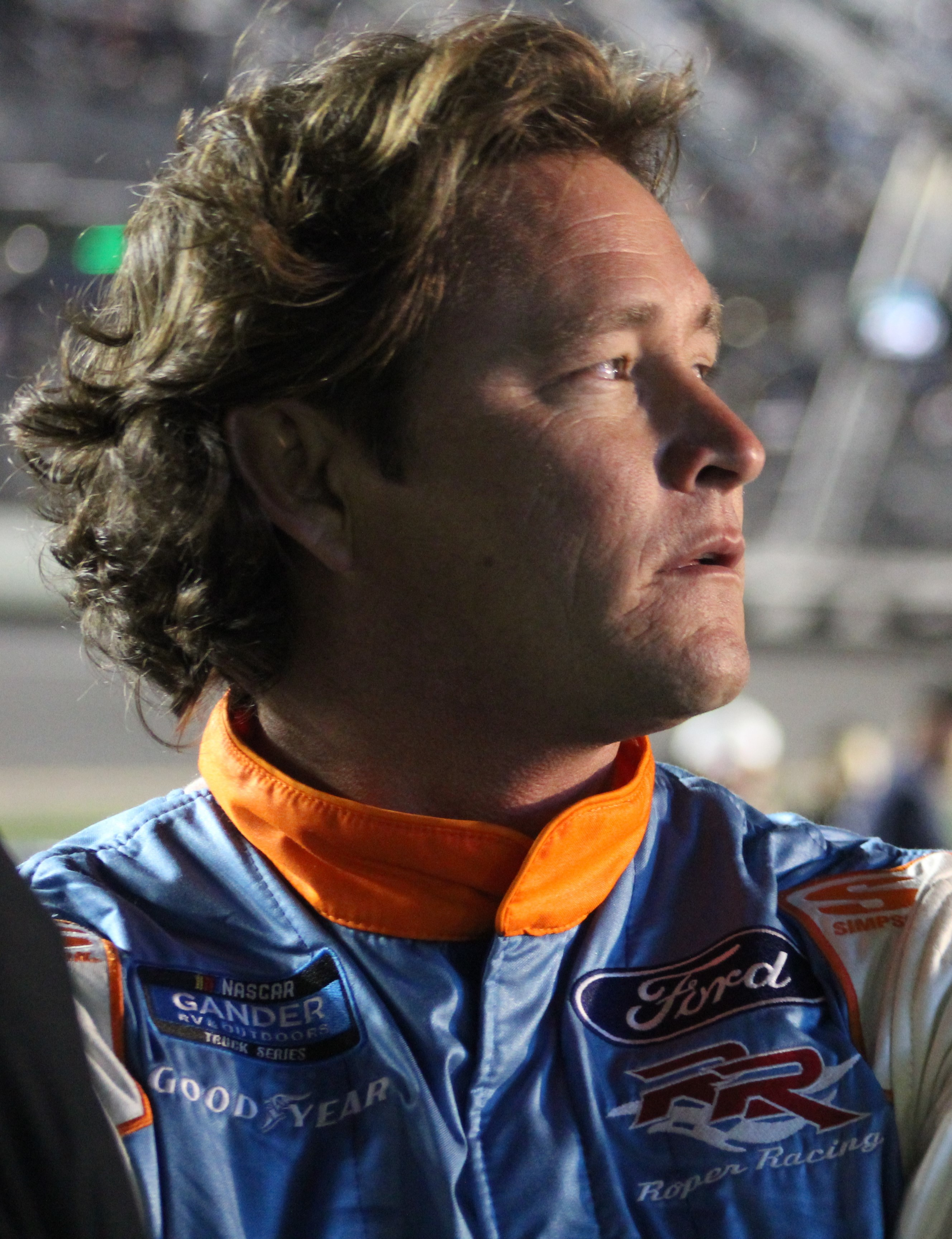
- Roper at Daytona International Speedway in 2020
- Born: Micah Cory Roper; July 31, 1977 (age 49); Vernon, Texas, U.S.

NASCAR FedEx Freight Truck Series career
- 50 races run over 7 years
- 2026 position: 66th
- Best finish: 25th (2021)
- First race: 2018 Alpha Energy Solutions 250 (Martinsville)
- Last race: 2026 Love's RV Stop 225 (Talladega)
Wins	Top tens	Poles
0	3	0

ARCA Menards Series East career
- 1 race run over 1 year
- Best finish: 50th (2026)
- First race: 2026 Rockingham ARCA Menards Series East 125 (Rockingham)
Wins	Top tens	Poles
0	1	0
- Statistics up to date as of November 6, 2026.

Micah Cory Roper (born July 31, 1977) is an American professional stock car racing driver and team owner. He last competed part-time in the NASCAR Craftsman Truck Series, driving the No. 62 Toyota Tundra TRD for Halmar Friesen Racing and part-time in the ARCA Menards Series East, driving the No. 17 Chevrolet for Cook Racing Technologies.

== Racing career ==
=== ASA National Tour ===
In 2002, Roper attempted to run the race in Illiana Motor Speedway in the No. 87 Pontiac but failed to qualify.

=== Craftsman Truck Series ===
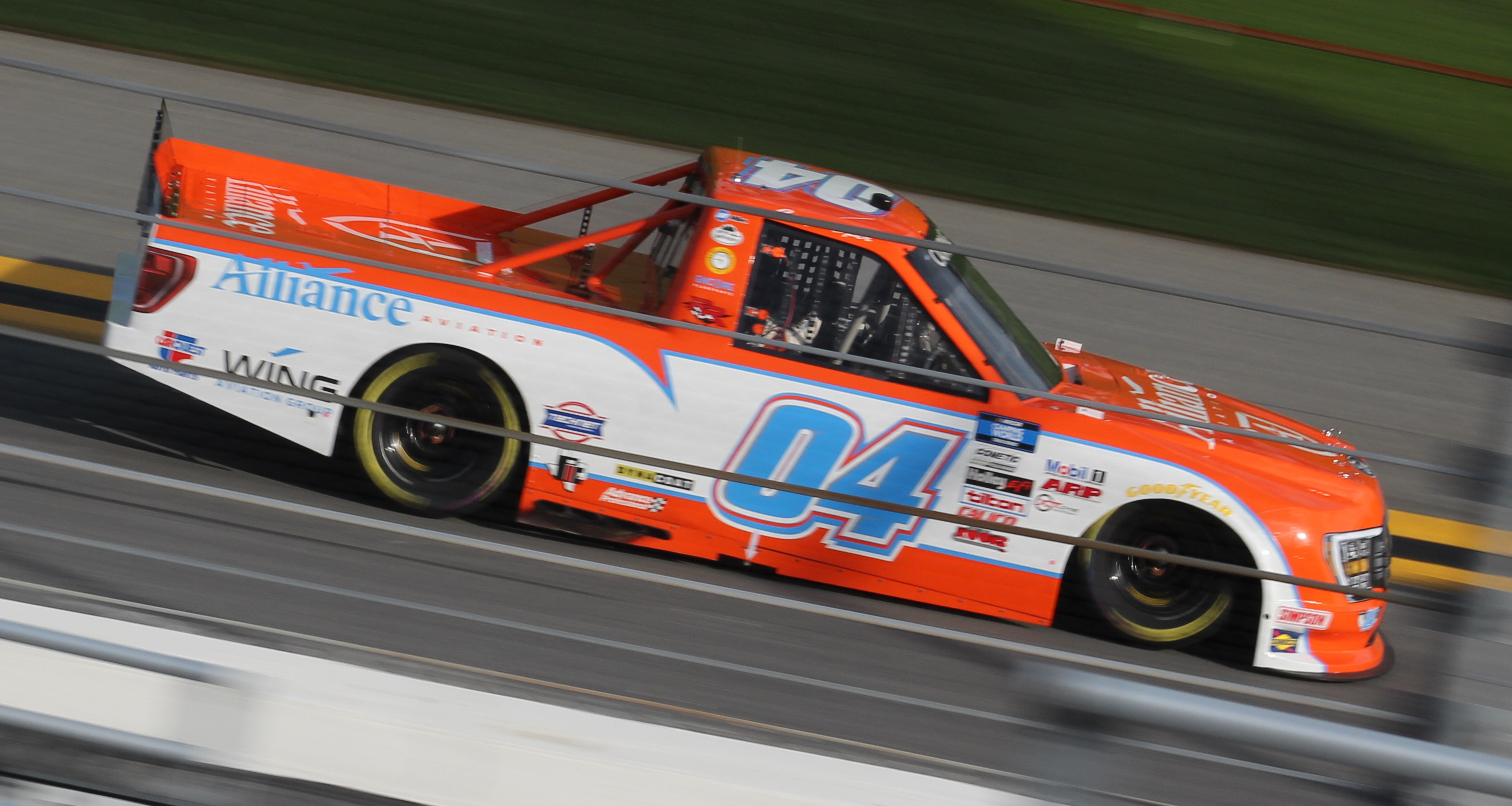
Roper at Daytona International Speedway in 2021

Roper made his NASCAR debut in 2018 at Martinsville in the Truck Series. He drove the No. 04 car for his own team, Roper Racing. He finished thirteenth in his first race after starting 17th. Roper ran his second race at Iowa, starting 26th and finishing 18th.

In Roper's maiden voyage of 2019, he made an impressive run to second position from his 25th starting position at Daytona International Speedway before being eliminated by a wreck. Roper said that his team would like to run the full 2019 schedule but would need more funding to do so. At Atlanta Roper qualified 28th while finishing 16th. At Las Vegas, he would have a strong showing qualifying fifth but ending early as he would tangle with Matt Crafton early in the race. Roper had planned a full schedule in 2020. Following the Daytona Road Course event, Roper and his team did not show up for another event.

Roper announced plans to attempt the full schedule again in 2021. In the opener at Daytona, Roper took the lead on the final lap but suffered damage from a push by Sheldon Creed and was unable to block Ben Rhodes, who—along with Jordan Anderson—passed him coming to the finish as he finished third.

On February 22, 2023, Roper was indefinitely suspended by NASCAR for violating NASCAR's substance abuse policy. He would not be eligible to return to the sport until he completed NASCAR's road to recovery program. He was reinstated on March 21.

Rpoer returned in 2024 and competed at Daytona and Talladega. After skipping 2025, he competed in the ARCA Menards Series East at Rockingham. He also returned to the Truck Series, this time with Halmar Friesen Racing at Texas.

== Personal life ==
He is not related to Tony Roper or his father Dean Roper.

== Motorsports career results ==
=== NASCAR ===
(key) (Bold – Pole position awarded by qualifying time. Italics – Pole position earned by points standings or practice time. * – Most laps led.)

==== Craftsman Truck Series ====
NASCAR Craftsman Truck Series results
Year	Team	No.	Make	1	2	3	4	5	6	7	8	9	10	11	12	13	14	15	16	17	18	19	20	21	22	23	24	25	NCTC	Pts	Ref
2018	Roper Racing	04	Ford	DAY	ATL	LVS	MAR; 13	DOV	KAN	CLT	TEX	IOW; 18	GTW	CHI	KEN	ELD	POC	MCH	BRI; 25	MSP	LVS; 25	TAL	MAR	TEX; 28	PHO	HOM; 17			37th	96	
2019	Roper Racing	04	Ford	DAY; 20	ATL; 16	LVS; 24	MAR; 31	TEX; 12	DOV	KAN	CLT; 20	TEX; 9	IOW	GTW	CHI	KEN	POC	ELD	MCH; 28	BRI; DNQ	MSP	LVS; DNQ	TAL	MAR	PHO	HOM; 27			27th	146	
2020	Roper Racing	04	Ford	DAY; 14	LVS; 26	CLT; 32	ATL; 23	HOM; 21	POC; 25	KEN; 23	TEX; 17	KAN; 20	KAN; 36	MCH; 24	DRC; 26	DOV	GTW	DAR	RCH	BRI	LVS	TAL	KAN	TEX	MAR	PHO			29th	161	
2021	Roper Racing	04	Ford	DAY; 3	DRC; 34	LVS; 36	ATL; 27	BRD	RCH; 31	KAN	DAR; 40	COA; 30	CLT; 25	TEX; 18	NSH; 31	POC	KNX	GLN	GTW; 17	DAR	BRI; 20	LVS; 28	TAL; 6	MAR; 37	PHO; 30				25th	184	
2022	Roper Racing	04	Ford	DAY	LVS	ATL	COA	MAR	BRD	DAR	KAN	TEX	CLT	GTW	SON	KNO	NSH	MOH	POC	IRP	RCH	KAN	BRI	TAL; Wth	HOM	PHO			-	-	
2023	Roper Racing	04	Ford	DAY	LVS	ATL	COA	TEX	BRD	MAR	KAN	DAR	NWS	CLT	GTW	NSH; 21	MOH	POC; 23	RCH	IRP	MLW	KAN	BRI	TAL; 22	HOM	PHO			40th	45	
2024	Roper Racing	04	Chevy	DAY; 22	ATL	LVS	BRI	COA	MAR	TEX	KAN	DAR	NWS	CLT	GTW	NSH	POC	IRP	RCH	MLW	BRI	KAN	TAL; 16	HOM	MAR	PHO			44th	36	
2026	Halmar Friesen Racing	62	Toyota	DAY	ATL	STP	DAR	CAR	BRI	TEX; 34	GLN	DOV	CLT	NSH	MCH	COR	LRP	NWS	IRP	RCH	NHA	BRI	KAN	CLT	PHO	TAL; 18	MAR	HOM	66th	22	

=== ARCA Menards Series East ===
(key) (Bold – Pole position awarded by qualifying time. Italics – Pole position earned by points standings or practice time. * – Most laps led.)

ARCA Menards Series East results
Year	Team	No.	Make	1	2	3	4	5	6	7	8	AMSEC	Pts	Ref
2026	Cook Racing Technologies	17	Chevy	HCY	CAR; 7	NSV	TOL	IRP	FRS	IOW	BRI	50th	37	

^{*} Season still in progress
^{1} Ineligible for series points
