= 2018 Alpha Energy Solutions 250 =

Race details
- Race 4 of 23 of the 2018 NASCAR Camping World Truck Series
- Date: March 24–26 2018
- Official name: Alpha Energy Solutions 250
- Location: Martinsville, Virginia, Martinsville Speedway
- Course: Permanent racing facility
- Course length: 0.526 miles (0.847 km)
- Distance: 250 laps, 131.5 mi (211.628 km)
- Scheduled distance: 250 laps, 131.5 mi (211.628 km)
- Average speed: 64.628 miles per hour (104.009 km/h)

Pole position
Driver	Ben Rhodes	ThorSport Racing
- Time: 19.737

Most laps led
Driver	Ben Rhodes	ThorSport Racing
- Laps: 134

Winner
No. 8	John Hunter Nemechek	NEMCO Motorsports

Television in the United States
- Network: Fox Sports 1
- Announcers: Vince Welch, Phil Parsons, Michael Waltrip

Radio in the United States
- Radio: Motor Racing Network

The 2018 Alpha Energy Solutions 250 was the fourth stock car race of the 2018 NASCAR Camping World Truck Series, and the 24th iteration of the event. The race was originally held on Saturday, March 24, 2018 but after 24 laps, rain and snow postponed the race until Monday, March 26, 2018. The race was held in Martinsville, Virginia at Martinsville Speedway. The race took the scheduled 250 laps to complete. John Hunter Nemechek, driving a part-time schedule for NEMCO Motorsports would win the race after holding off Kyle Benjamin on a late-race restart, garnering the 6th win of his career and the first of the season.

The race was the NASCAR Camping World Truck Series debut for Tyler Matthews, Cory Roper, and Reid Wilson.

== Background ==
The layout of Martinsville Speedway, the venue where the race was held.

Martinsville Speedway is a NASCAR-owned stock car racing track located in Henry County, in Ridgeway, Virginia, just to the south of Martinsville. At 0.526 miles (0.847 km) in length, it is the shortest track in the NASCAR Cup Series. The track was also one of the first paved oval tracks in NASCAR, being built in 1947 by H. Clay Earles. It is also the only remaining race track that has been on the NASCAR circuit from its beginning in 1948.

=== Entry list ===
#	Driver	Team	Make	Sponsor
1	Mike Senica	TJL Motorsports	Chevrolet	Pennsylvania Power Products, Inc.
2	Cody Coughlin	GMS Racing	Chevrolet	Jegs
02	Austin Hill	Young's Motorsports	Chevrolet	United Rentals
3	Jordan Anderson	Jordan Anderson Racing	Chevrolet	Bommarito Automotive Group, Lucas Oil
4	Todd Gilliland	Kyle Busch Motorsports	Toyota	Mobil 1
04	Cory Roper	Roper Racing	Ford	Preferred Industrial Contractors, Inc.
6	Norm Benning	Norm Benning Racing	Chevrolet	Zomongo
8	John Hunter Nemechek	NEMCO Motorsports	Chevrolet	Fleetwing, D. A. B. Constructors, Inc.
10	Jennifer Jo Cobb	Jennifer Jo Cobb Racing	Chevrolet	Driven2Honor.org
13	Myatt Snider	ThorSport Racing	Ford	Liberty Tax "You Do Life, We Do Taxes"
15	Robby Lyons	Premium Motorsports	Chevrolet	Bubba Bear Sauce Ain't Giving It Up Sauce
16	Brett Moffitt	Hattori Racing Enterprises	Toyota	Aisin
18	Noah Gragson	Kyle Busch Motorsports	Toyota	Safelite Auto Glass
20	Reid Wilson	Young's Motorsports	Chevrolet	OEM2 powered by TruNorth
21	Johnny Sauter	GMS Racing	Chevrolet	Allegiant Air
22	Austin Wayne Self	Niece Motorsports	Chevrolet	Kreuz Market "Shipping Real TX BBQ"
24	Justin Haley	GMS Racing	Chevrolet	Fraternal Order of Eagles
25	Dalton Sargeant	GMS Racing	Chevrolet	Performance Plus Motor Oil
33	Josh Reaume	Reaume Brothers Racing	Chevrolet	Green Heart Partners, R-Coin
35	Travis Kvapil*	NextGen Motorsports	Chevrolet	
41	Ben Rhodes	ThorSport Racing	Ford	Alpha Energy Solutions
45	Justin Fontaine	Niece Motorsports	Chevrolet	ProMatic Automation
49	Wendell Chavous	Premium Motorsports	Chevrolet	SobrietyNation.org
50	Dawson Cram	Beaver Motorsports	Chevrolet	Fluidyne, Bojangles
51	Harrison Burton	Kyle Busch Motorsports	Toyota	DEX Imaging
52	Stewart Friesen	Halmar Friesen Racing	Chevrolet	Halmar "We Build America"
54	Kyle Benjamin	DGR-Crosley	Toyota	Crosley Brands
57	Jeff Zillweger*	Norm Benning Racing	Chevrolet	
63	Kevin Donahue	Copp Motorsports	Chevrolet	First Responder Racing
74	Mike Harmon	Mike Harmon Racing	Chevrolet	Horizon Transport
83	Kyle Donahue	Copp Motorsports	Chevrolet	First Responder Racing
87	Joe Nemechek*	NEMCO Motorsports	Chevrolet	
88	Matt Crafton	ThorSport Racing	Ford	Menards, Ideal Door Garage Doors
92	Timothy Peters	RBR Enterprises	Ford	BTS Tire & Wheel Distributors
98	Grant Enfinger	ThorSport Racing	Ford	Champion Power Equipment "Powering Your Life."
99	Tyler Matthews	MDM Motorsports	Chevrolet	Scott & Stringfellow, BB&T, Popeyes
Official entry list

*Withdrew.

== Practice ==
=== First practice ===
First practice was held on Friday, March 23, at 11:05 AM EST. Justin Haley of GMS Racing would set the fastest time with a 20.118 and an average speed of 94.125 miles per hour (151.480 km/h).

Pos.	#	Driver	Team	Make	Time	Speed
1	24	Justin Haley	GMS Racing	Chevrolet	20.118	94.125
2	18	Noah Gragson	Kyle Busch Motorsports	Toyota	20.168	93.891
3	88	Matt Crafton	ThorSport Racing	Ford	20.201	93.738
Full first practice results

=== Second practice ===
Second practice was held on Friday, March 23, at 1:05 PM EST. Matt Crafton of ThorSport Racing would set the fastest time with a 20.023 and an average speed of 94.571 miles per hour (152.197 km/h).

Pos.	#	Driver	Team	Make	Time	Speed
1	88	Matt Crafton	ThorSport Racing	Ford	20.023	94.571
2	16	Brett Moffitt	Hattori Racing Enterprises	Toyota	20.026	94.557
3	2	Cody Coughlin	GMS Racing	Chevrolet	20.032	94.529
Full second practice results

=== Third and final practice ===
Third and final practice was held on Friday, March 23, at 3:05 PM EST. Grant Enfinger of ThorSport Racing would set the fastest time with a 19.921 and an average speed of 95.056 miles per hour (152.978 km/h).

Pos.	#	Driver	Team	Make	Time	Speed
1	98	Grant Enfinger	ThorSport Racing	Ford	19.921	95.056
2	88	Matt Crafton	ThorSport Racing	Ford	19.924	95.041
3	54	Kyle Benjamin	DGR-Crosley	Toyota	19.959	94.874
Full final practice results

== Qualifying ==
Qualifying was held on Saturday, March 24, at 11:05 AM EST. Since Martinsville Speedway is a short track, the qualifying system was a multi-car system that included three rounds. The first round was 15 minutes, where every driver would be able to set a lap within the 15 minutes. Then, the second round would consist of the fastest 24 cars in Round 1, and drivers would have 10 minutes to set a lap. Round 3 consisted of the fastest 12 drivers from Round 2, and the drivers would have 5 minutes to set a time. Whoever was fastest in Round 3 would win the pole.

Ben Rhodes of ThorSport Racing would set the fastest time in Round 3, with a 19.737 and an average speed of 95.942 miles per hour (154.404 km/h), thus winning the pole.

While Mike Harmon would not set the slowest time (Mike Senica would set the slowest, being a over a second slower than Harmon), Harmon would not have enough owner points to qualify, making Harmon the only driver to fail to qualify for the race.

Pos.	#	Driver	Team	Make	Time (R1)	Speed (R1)	Time (R2)	Speed (R2)	Time (R3)	Speed (R3)
1	41	Ben Rhodes	ThorSport Racing	Ford					19.737	95.942
2	88	Matt Crafton	ThorSport Racing	Ford					19.786	95.704
3	98	Grant Enfinger	ThorSport Racing	Ford					19.810	95.588
4	54	Kyle Benjamin	DGR-Crosley	Toyota					19.830	95.492
5	52	Stewart Friesen	Halmar Friesen Racing	Chevrolet					19.831	95.487
6	21	Johnny Sauter	GMS Racing	Chevrolet					19.832	95.482
7	16	Brett Moffitt	Hattori Racing Enterprises	Toyota					19.850	95.395
8	8	John Hunter Nemechek	NEMCO Motorsports	Chevrolet					19.851	95.391
9	13	Myatt Snider	ThorSport Racing	Ford					19.889	95.208
10	2	Cody Coughlin	GMS Racing	Chevrolet					19.902	95.146
11	18	Noah Gragson	Kyle Busch Motorsports	Toyota					19.965	94.846
12	24	Justin Haley	GMS Racing	Chevrolet					20.050	94.444
Eliminated in Round 2
13	51	Harrison Burton	Kyle Busch Motorsports	Toyota			19.981	94.770	—	—
14	99	Tyler Matthews	MDM Motorsports	Chevrolet			20.011	94.628	—	—
15	02	Austin Hill	Young's Motorsports	Chevrolet			20.047	94.458	—	—
16	92	Timothy Peters	RBR Enterprises	Ford			20.097	94.223	—	—
17	04	Cory Roper	Roper Racing	Ford			20.133	94.055	—	—
18	25	Dalton Sargeant	GMS Racing	Chevrolet			20.176	93.854	—	—
19	45	Justin Fontaine	Niece Motorsports	Chevrolet			20.227	93.617	—	—
20	20	Reid Wilson	Young's Motorsports	Chevrolet			20.248	93.520	—	—
21	22	Austin Wayne Self	Niece Motorsports	Chevrolet			20.262	93.456	—	—
22	83	Kyle Donahue	Copp Motorsports	Chevrolet			20.406	92.796	—	—
23	4	Todd Gilliland	Kyle Busch Motorsports	Toyota	19.888	95.213	—	—	—	—
24	15	Robby Lyons	Premium Motorsports	Chevrolet	20.248	93.520	—	—	—	—
Eliminated in Round 1
25	3	Jordan Anderson	Jordan Anderson Racing	Chevrolet	20.414	92.760	—	—	—	—
26	33	Josh Reaume	Reaume Brothers Racing	Chevrolet	20.458	92.560	—	—	—	—
27	63	Kevin Donahue	Copp Motorsports	Chevrolet	20.474	92.488	—	—	—	—
Qualified by owner's points
28	50	Dawson Cram	Beaver Motorsports	Chevrolet	20.532	92.227	—	—	—	—
29	49	Wendell Chavous	Premium Motorsports	Chevrolet	20.783	91.113	—	—	—	—
30	6	Norm Benning	Norm Benning Racing	Chevrolet	20.998	90.180	—	—	—	—
31	10	Jennifer Jo Cobb	Jennifer Jo Cobb Racing	Chevrolet	21.669	87.388	—	—	—	—
32	1	Mike Senica	TJL Motorsports	Chevrolet	23.001	82.327	—	—	—	—
Failed to qualify or withdrew
33	74	Mike Harmon	Mike Harmon Racing	Chevrolet	21.621	87.582	—	—	—	—
WD	35	Travis Kvapil	NextGen Motorsports	Chevrolet	—	—	—	—	—	—
WD	57	Jeff Zillweger	Norm Benning Racing	Chevrolet	—	—	—	—	—	—
WD	87	Joe Nemechek	NEMCO Motorsports	Chevrolet	—	—	—	—	—	—
Official starting lineup

== Race results ==
Stage 1 Laps: 70

Fin	#	Driver	Team	Make	Pts
1	41	Ben Rhodes	ThorSport Racing	Ford	10
2	88	Matt Crafton	ThorSport Racing	Ford	9
3	98	Grant Enfinger	ThorSport Racing	Ford	8
4	21	Johnny Sauter	GMS Racing	Chevrolet	7
5	54	Kyle Benjamin	DGR-Crosley	Toyota	0
6	8	John Hunter Nemechek	NEMCO Motorsports	Chevrolet	0
7	52	Stewart Friesen	Halmar Friesen Racing	Chevrolet	4
8	18	Noah Gragson	Kyle Busch Motorsports	Toyota	3
9	16	Brett Moffitt	Hattori Racing Enterprises	Toyota	2
10	13	Myatt Snider	ThorSport Racing	Ford	1

Stage 2 Laps: 70

Fin	#	Driver	Team	Make	Pts
1	41	Ben Rhodes	ThorSport Racing	Ford	10
2	4	Todd Gilliland	Kyle Busch Motorsports	Toyota	9
3	21	Johnny Sauter	GMS Racing	Chevrolet	8
4	88	Matt Crafton	ThorSport Racing	Ford	7
5	8	John Hunter Nemechek	NEMCO Motorsports	Chevrolet	0
6	18	Noah Gragson	Kyle Busch Motorsports	Toyota	5
7	16	Brett Moffitt	Hattori Racing Enterprises	Toyota	4
8	98	Grant Enfinger	ThorSport Racing	Ford	3
9	13	Myatt Snider	ThorSport Racing	Ford	2
10	51	Harrison Burton	Kyle Busch Motorsports	Toyota	1

Stage 3 Laps: 110

Fin	St	#	Driver	Team	Make	Laps	Led	Status	Pts
1	8	8	John Hunter Nemechek	NEMCO Motorsports	Chevrolet	250	31	running	0
2	4	54	Kyle Benjamin	DGR-Crosley	Toyota	250	74	running	0
3	7	16	Brett Moffitt	Hattori Racing Enterprises	Toyota	250	0	running	41
4	3	98	Grant Enfinger	ThorSport Racing	Ford	250	0	running	44
5	11	18	Noah Gragson	Kyle Busch Motorsports	Toyota	250	0	running	39
6	9	13	Myatt Snider	ThorSport Racing	Ford	250	0	running	34
7	16	92	Timothy Peters	RBR Enterprises	Ford	250	0	running	30
8	13	51	Harrison Burton	Kyle Busch Motorsports	Toyota	250	0	running	30
9	15	02	Austin Hill	Young's Motorsports	Chevrolet	250	0	running	28
10	12	24	Justin Haley	GMS Racing	Chevrolet	250	0	running	27
11	18	25	Dalton Sargeant	GMS Racing	Chevrolet	250	0	running	26
12	1	41	Ben Rhodes	ThorSport Racing	Ford	250	134	running	45
13	17	04	Cory Roper	Roper Racing	Ford	250	0	running	24
14	23	4	Todd Gilliland	Kyle Busch Motorsports	Toyota	250	1	running	32
15	2	88	Matt Crafton	ThorSport Racing	Ford	250	4	running	38
16	20	20	Reid Wilson	Young's Motorsports	Chevrolet	250	0	running	21
17	28	50	Dawson Cram	Beaver Motorsports	Chevrolet	250	0	running	20
18	29	49	Wendell Chavous	Premium Motorsports	Chevrolet	250	0	running	19
19	6	21	Johnny Sauter	GMS Racing	Chevrolet	249	0	running	33
20	5	52	Stewart Friesen	Halmar Friesen Racing	Chevrolet	248	6	running	21
21	14	99	Tyler Matthews	MDM Motorsports	Chevrolet	248	0	running	16
22	25	3	Jordan Anderson	Jordan Anderson Racing	Chevrolet	248	0	running	15
23	22	83	Kyle Donahue	Copp Motorsports	Chevrolet	234	0	electrical	14
24	24	15	Robby Lyons	Premium Motorsports	Chevrolet	227	0	engine	13
25	26	33	Josh Reaume	Reaume Brothers Racing	Chevrolet	227	0	running	12
26	10	2	Cody Coughlin	GMS Racing	Chevrolet	225	0	running	11
27	21	22	Austin Wayne Self	Niece Motorsports	Chevrolet	164	0	electrical	10
28	19	45	Justin Fontaine	Niece Motorsports	Chevrolet	158	0	crash	9
29	31	10	Jennifer Jo Cobb	Jennifer Jo Cobb Racing	Chevrolet	55	0	electrical	8
30	27	63	Kevin Donahue	Copp Motorsports	Chevrolet	49	0	brakes	7
31	30	6	Norm Benning	Norm Benning Racing	Chevrolet	35	0	too slow	6
32	32	1	Mike Senica	TJL Motorsports	Chevrolet	8	0	parked	5
Failed to qualify or withdrew
33		74	Mike Harmon	Mike Harmon Racing	Chevrolet				
WD		35	Travis Kvapil	NextGen Motorsports	Chevrolet				
WD		57	Jeff Zillweger	Norm Benning Racing	Chevrolet				
WD		87	Joe Nemechek	NEMCO Motorsports	Chevrolet				

Previous race: 2018 Stratosphere 200	NASCAR Camping World Truck Series; 2018 season	Next race: 2018 JEGS 200
