= Ben Rhodes (racing driver) =

American racing driver (born 1997)

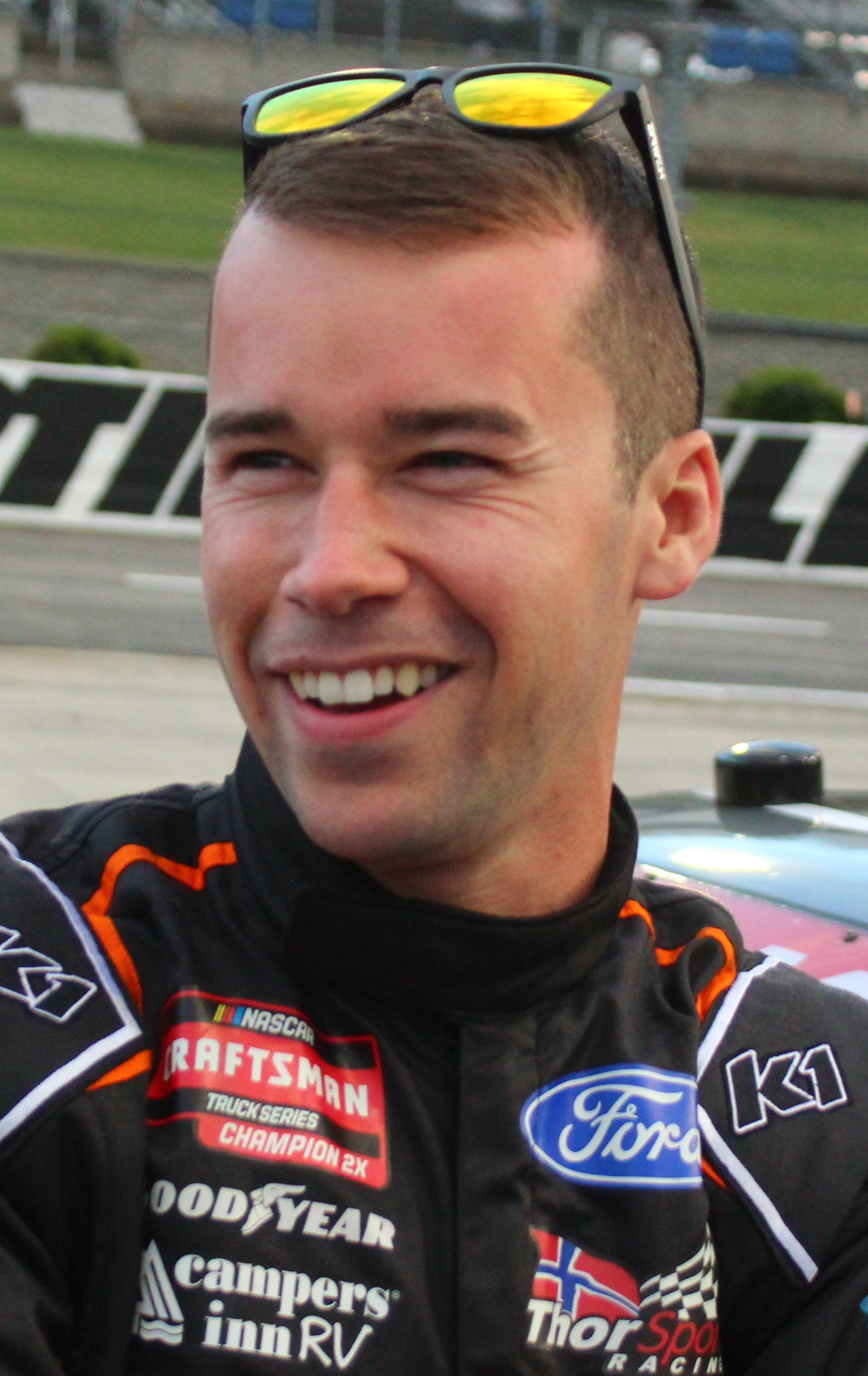
- Rhodes at Martinsville Speedway in 2024
- Born: Benjamin Jon Rhodes; February 21, 1997 (age 29); Louisville, Kentucky, U.S.
- Achievements: 2021, 2023 NASCAR Craftsman Truck Series Champion; 2014 NASCAR K&N Pro Series East Champion

NASCAR Cup Series career
- 1 race run over 1 year
- 2021 position: 63rd
- Best finish: 63rd (2021)
- First race: 2021 Toyota/Save Mart 350 (Sonoma)
Wins	Top tens	Poles
0	0	0

NASCAR O'Reilly Auto Parts Series career
- 10 races run over 1 year
- 2015 position: 28th
- Best finish: 28th (2015)
- First race: 2015 3M 250 (Iowa)
- Last race: 2015 Ford EcoBoost 300 (Homestead)
Wins	Top tens	Poles
0	2	0

NASCAR FedEx Freight Truck Series career
- 260 races run over 12 years
- Truck no., team: No. 99 (ThorSport Racing)
- 2026 position: 8th
- Best finish: 1st (2021, 2023)
- First race: 2014 Kroger 250 (Martinsville)
- Last race: 2026 Craftsman 200 (Homestead)
- First win: 2017 Las Vegas 350 (Las Vegas)
- Last win: 2023 North Carolina Education Lottery 200 (Charlotte)
Wins	Top tens	Poles
7	127	7

ARCA Menards Series career
- 2 races run over 1 year
- Best finish: 61st (2014)
- First race: 2014 Herr's Live Life With Flavor 200 (Madison)
- Last race: 2014 ZLOOP 150 (Kentucky)
Wins	Top tens	Poles
0	0	0

ARCA Menards Series East career
- 23 races run over 2 years
- Best finish: 1st (2014)
- First race: 2013 DRIVE4COPD 125 (Bristol)
- Last race: 2014 Drive Sober 150 (Dover)
- First win: 2014 Kevin Whitaker Chevrolet 150 (Greenville-Pickens)
- Last win: 2014 Visit Hampton VA 175 (Langley)
Wins	Top tens	Poles
5	18	6
- Statistics up to date as of November 6, 2026.

Benjamin Jon Rhodes (born February 21, 1997) is an American professional stock car racing driver. He competes full-time in the NASCAR Craftsman Truck Series, driving the No. 99 Ford F-150 for ThorSport Racing. He is the 2021 and 2023 Truck Series champion. Before moving up to the Truck Series, Rhodes competed full-time in what is now the ARCA Menards Series East, where he drove for Turner Scott Motorsports and won the 2014 series championship. He also has previously competed part-time in the NASCAR Cup Series, the NASCAR Xfinity Series, and what is now the ARCA Menards Series.

== Racing career ==
=== Early years ===
Rhodes began his career in 2004 when he was seven years old, starting in kart racing, winning several champion titles before moving to Bandoleros in 2008, and Legends cars in 2010, then moving up to late model stock cars beginning in 2011.

After earning several wins, in 2012 he signed with then-Sprint Cup Series driver Marcos Ambrose to begin racing Late Model cars in the UARA-STARS Series under the Marcos Ambrose Motorsports banner. After the 2012 season, Rhodes signed a deal with Turner Scott Motorsports to begin racing part-time in the NASCAR K&N Pro Series East in 2013. Rhodes scored five top five finishes in seven starts. In June of that year, Rhodes was named to the NASCAR Next roster, composed of up-and-coming drivers expected to become the next group of stars in NASCAR competition.

=== K&N Pro Series East ===
Rhodes would move full-time in the K&N East Series for 2014, with former driver Mark McFarland as his crew chief. In mid-March 2014, it was announced Rhodes would make his Camping World Truck Series debut at Martinsville in the Kroger 250 for TSM, and drive in three additional Truck series races that season. He earned three top tens, including an eighth-place finish in his debut, in four Truck Series races. Rhodes would also make his ARCA Racing Series debut at his home track Kentucky Speedway, starting fifth but finishing 27th after a crash. Rhodes would claim TSM's second consecutive K&N Pro Series East Championship through five wins, eleven top-five finishes, and six poles. Rhodes would also tie a series record set by Ricky Craven in 1991 by winning four consecutive races (Iowa, Bowman Gray, Five Flags, Langley Speedway) between May and June.

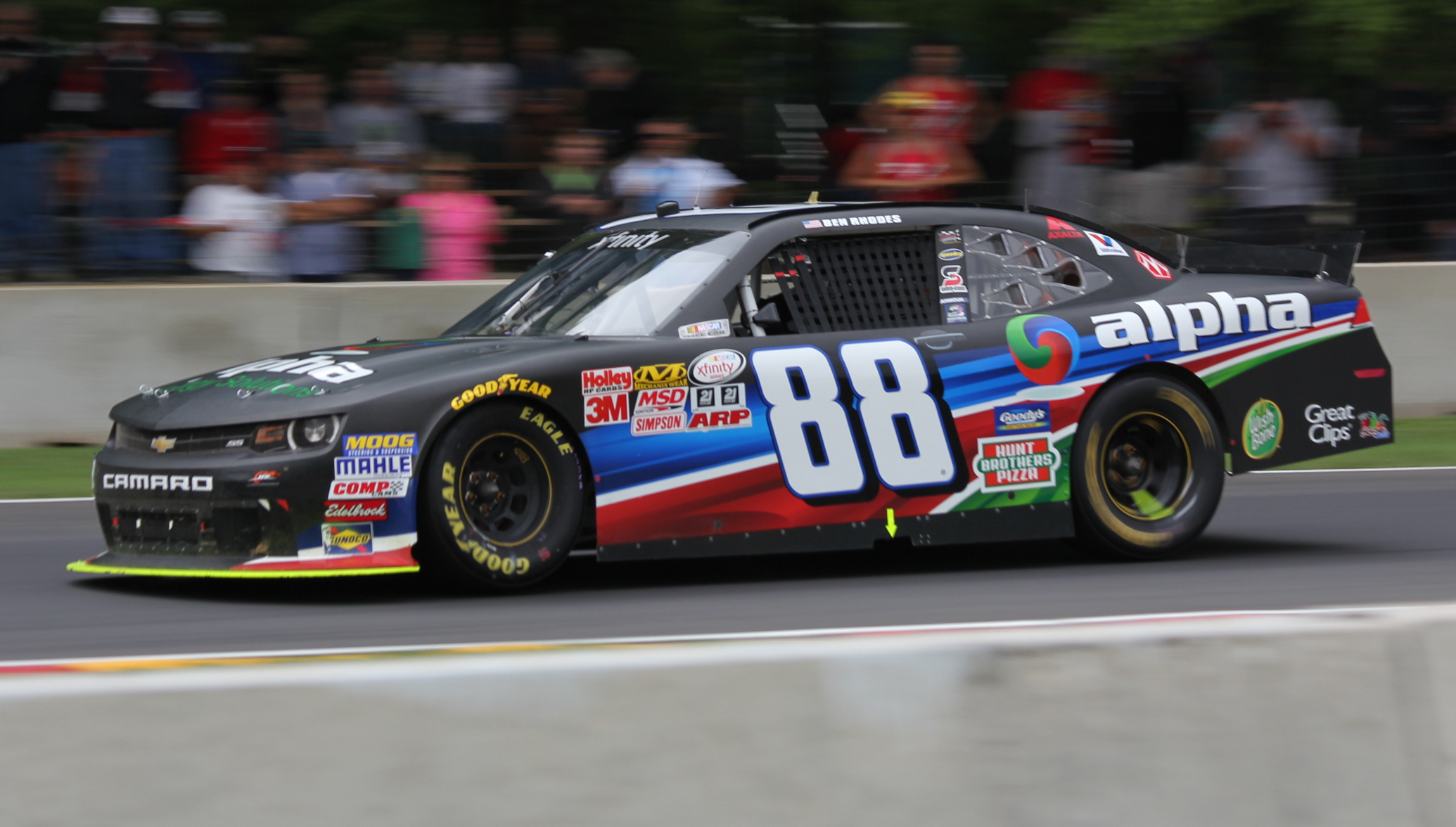
Rhodes turning left in turn six after winning his first pole position at Road America in 2015

=== Xfinity Series ===
In December 2014, it was announced that Rhodes would move up to the Xfinity Series (formerly the Nationwide Series) with JR Motorsports for 10 races in the 2015 season, sharing the No. 88 Chevrolet Camaro with Sprint Cup Series drivers Dale Earnhardt Jr., Kevin Harvick, and Kasey Kahne. Rhodes made his debut with the team at Iowa Speedway on May 16, finishing seventh. Rhodes had the fastest time in the first practice at Road America in August 2015 and he was awarded the pole position after qualifying rained out. On October 20, Rhodes announced that he had left JRM, intending to run a full-time Xfinity schedule in 2016.

=== Craftsman Truck Series ===
On December 15, 2015, Rhodes joined ThorSport Racing to run full-time in the Truck Series in 2016, driving the No. 41 Toyota Tundra. Rhodes started the season with a seventh-place finish at Daytona. Rhodes and Johnny Sauter were in contention for the win at Kansas but both crashed on the final lap, allowing William Byron to secure the first win of his career. Rhodes missed the inaugural Truck Series Chase and finished 14th in series points.

Rhodes returned to ThorSport for the 2017 season with new crew chief Eddie Troconis and renumbered No. 27 Tundra. Rhodes came close to victory at Kansas when, after passing Kyle Busch late in the race, his engine expired with ten laps to go. On September 15, Rhodes secured a spot in the 2017 Truck Series playoffs. On September 30, Rhodes held off eventual champion Christopher Bell to win his first Truck race at the Las Vegas 350.

For 2018, Rhodes returned to the No. 41 truck, now a Ford F-Series, with Troconis returning as crew chief. After being plagued by engine troubles throughout the year, he won his second career race at Kentucky Speedway after dominating the race and holding off a hard-charging Stewart Friesen. He finished the season eighth in points.

A repeat win in 2019 with ThorSport was not to be, however, as the lapped truck of Brennan Poole made contact with Rhodes in the late stages of the race, causing tire problems and relegating Rhodes to a nineteenth-place finish. Rhodes, irate with Poole after the race, twice tried to physically confront Poole before being pulled away. Rhodes later said he was mad at Poole because he believed the lapped truck cost him a shot at a win and a berth in the NASCAR playoffs. Later in the regular season at Eldora Speedway, Tyler Dippel forced Rhodes into the wall in the late stages of the race, again knocking Rhodes from a top-ten finish, and then rammed his truck into Rhodes on the cooldown lap. On pit road after the race, Rhodes tried to drag Dippel from his truck before calling him a dirty driver. Dippel, in return, directed an expletive-laced tirade at Rhodes and called it "cool" that Rhodes would miss the playoffs, which Rhodes indeed did.

Rhodes returned to ThorSport in 2020. He had a tumultuous race at the SpeedyCash.com 400 in October, when contact from Rhodes caused Todd Gilliland, Christian Eckes, and Josh Bilicki to retire from the race in three separate incidents. Rhodes blamed Eckes for driving him into the wall in retaliation against him, and blamed Chandler Smith for the wreck with Bilicki; Rhodes later exchanged words and had a shoving match with Eckes after the race.

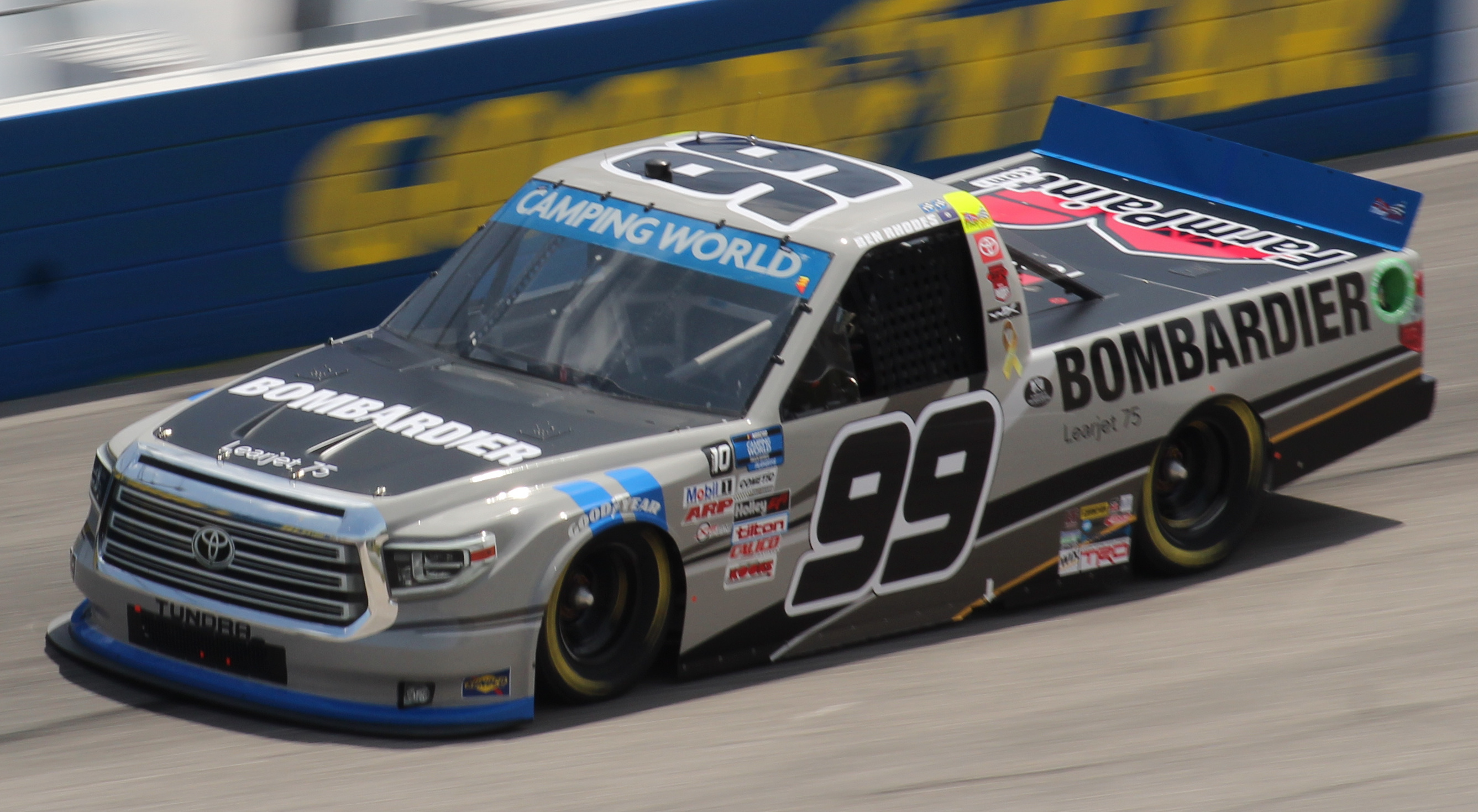
Rhodes racing at Darlington Raceway in 2021

The 2021 season began with Rhodes winning the first race at Daytona International Speedway after passing leader Cory Roper as they approached the finish. Rhodes followed his Daytona oval win with a victory at the Daytona Road Course the next week in the BrakeBest Brake Pads 159, scoring back to back victories for the first time in his career. Rhodes won his first Truck Series championship on November 5 by finishing third in the race. Overall, Rhodes had two wins, eight top-five finishes, sixteen top ten finishes, nnieteen lead lap finishes, an average finish of 9.3, and no DNFs.

In 2022, Rhodes finished second at Daytona. He DNF'd at 31st place at Las Vegas but made up for the loss with three consecutive top-five finishes before winning at the Bristol dirt race. Rhodes finished second at Phoenix and second in the standings.

Rhodes started the 2023 season with an eleventh-place finish at Daytona. He scored his only win of the season with Jeriod Prince as his crew chief at Charlotte. a change in crew chief was made to Rich Lushes and Rhodes finished second at Homestead to make the Championship 4. He finished fifth at Phoenix; as the highest-finishing Championship 4 driver in the race, he clinched his second Truck Series championship.

Rhodes' 2024 season saw a significant decline in performance compared to last season. Rhodes only had six Top 10s during the regular season, but he was still able to qualify for the Playoffs. However, he would be eliminated after the first round, ultimately finishing ninth in the standings. It marked his first winless season since 2019.

Rhodes' decline continued in the 2025 season, ultimately missing the Playoffs for the first time since 2019.

=== Cup Series ===
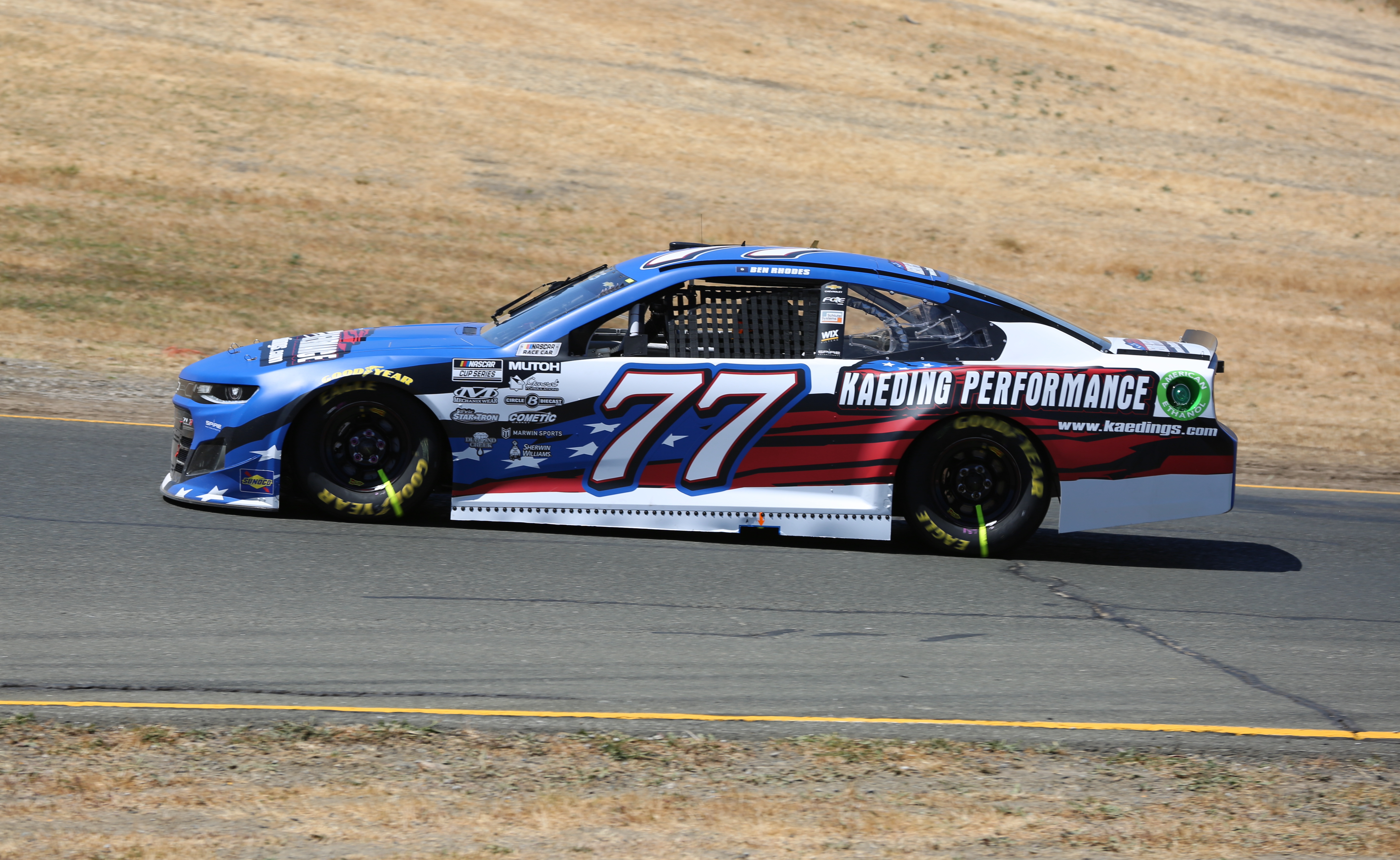
Rhodes' No. 77 car at Sonoma Raceway in 2021

On May 31, 2021, it was revealed through the release of the entry list for the Cup Series race at Sonoma that Rhodes would make his debut in the series in the No. 77 for Spire Motorsports. The usual driver of that car, Justin Haley, a full-time Xfinity Series driver, was at Mid-Ohio Sports Car Course for the race in that series that weekend. Rhodes was available due to the Truck Series having an off weekend that weekend. Rhodes started 31st and finished 30th.

=== Other racing ===
In March 2019, Rhodes participated in the Michelin Pilot Challenge sports car race at Sebring International Raceway, driving a Ford for Multimatic Motorsports alongside ThorSport Racing teammates Matt Crafton, Grant Enfinger, and Myatt Snider.

== Personal life ==
Rhodes is the son of Lori and Joe Rhodes. His father is the president of a Kentucky-based mechanical service contractor, Alpha Energy Solutions, which has sponsored Ben's racing efforts.

Rhodes graduated from Holy Cross High School in Louisville, Kentucky in 2015, finishing with a 3.98 GPA despite missing classes due to his racing career. He missed the school's graduation ceremony on May 15 because he was in Iowa to prepare for his Xfinity Series debut the next day; the school's president traveled to the race to present Rhodes with his diploma during driver introductions.

== Motorsports career results ==
=== Racing career summary ===
Season	Series	Team	Races	Wins	Top 5	Top 10	Points	Position
2013	NASCAR K&N Pro Series East	Turner Scott Motorsports	7	0	2	5	217	19th
2014	NASCAR K&N Pro Series East	Turner Scott Motorsports	16	5	11	13	640	**1st**
2014	NASCAR Camping World Truck Series	Turner Scott Motorsports	4	0	1	3	132	35th
2014	ARCA Racing Series	Turner Scott Motorsports	1	0	0	0	275	61st
2014	ARCA Racing Series	Venturini Motorsports	1	0	0	0	275	61st
2015	NASCAR Xfinity Series	JR Motorsports	10	0	0	2	230	28th
2016	NASCAR Camping World Truck Series	ThorSport Racing	23	0	2	6	387	14th
2017	NASCAR Camping World Truck Series	ThorSport Racing	23	1	6	12	2263	5th
2018	NASCAR Camping World Truck Series	ThorSport Racing	23	1	8	13	2254	8th
2019	NASCAR Gander Outdoors Truck Series	ThorSport Racing	23	0	7	13	773	9th
2020	NASCAR Gander Outdoors Truck Series	ThorSport Racing	23	1	9	14	2240	7th
2021	NASCAR Camping World Truck Series	ThorSport Racing	22	2	8	16	4034	**1st**
2021	NASCAR Cup Series	Spire Motorsports	1	0	0	0	0	NC†
2022	NASCAR Camping World Truck Series	ThorSport Racing	23	1	8	13	4035	**2nd**
2023	NASCAR Craftsman Truck Series	ThorSport Racing	23	1	7	14	4032	**1st**
2024	NASCAR Craftsman Truck Series	ThorSport Racing	23	0	3	9	2150	9th
2025	NASCAR Craftsman Truck Series	ThorSport Racing	25	0	5	8	632	12th
2026	NASCAR Craftsman Truck Series	ThorSport Racing	25	0	6	7	2241	8th

^{†} As Rhodes was a guest driver, he was ineligible for championship points.

=== NASCAR ===
(key) (Bold – Pole position awarded by qualifying time. Italics – Pole position earned by points standings or practice time. * – Most laps led.)

==== Cup Series ====
NASCAR Cup Series results
Year	Team	No.	Make	1	2	3	4	5	6	7	8	9	10	11	12	13	14	15	16	17	18	19	20	21	22	23	24	25	26	27	28	29	30	31	32	33	34	35	36	NCSC	Pts	Ref
2021	Spire Motorsports	77	Chevy	DAY	DRC	HOM	LVS	PHO	ATL	BRD	MAR	RCH	TAL	KAN	DAR	DOV	COA	CLT	SON; 30	NSH	POC	POC	ROA	ATL	NHA	GLN	IRC	MCH	DAY	DAR	RCH	BRI	LVS	TAL	ROV	TEX	KAN	MAR	PHO	63rd	0^{1}	
2022	Kaulig Racing	16	Chevy	DAY	CAL	LVS	PHO	ATL	COA	RCH	MAR	BRD	TAL	DOV	DAR	KAN	CLT	GTW; QL^{†}	SON	NSH	ROA	ATL	NHA	POC	IRC	MCH	RCH	GLN	DAY	DAR	KAN	BRI	TEX	TAL	ROV	LVS	HOM	MAR	PHO	N/A	—	
^{†} – Qualified for A. J. Allmendinger

==== Xfinity Series ====
NASCAR Xfinity Series results
Year	Team	No.	Make	1	2	3	4	5	6	7	8	9	10	11	12	13	14	15	16	17	18	19	20	21	22	23	24	25	26	27	28	29	30	31	32	33	NXSC	Pts	Ref
2015	JR Motorsports	88	Chevy	DAY	ATL	LVS	PHO	CAL	TEX	BRI	RCH	TAL	IOW; 7	CLT	DOV	MCH	CHI; 21	DAY	KEN	NHA; 12	IND	IOW; 30	GLN; 35	MOH; 10	BRI	ROA; 32	DAR	RCH	CHI	KEN; 30	DOV; 13	CLT	KAN	TEX	PHO	HOM; 20	28th	230	

==== Craftsman Truck Series ====
NASCAR Craftsman Truck Series results
Year	Team	No.	Make	1	2	3	4	5	6	7	8	9	10	11	12	13	14	15	16	17	18	19	20	21	22	23	24	25	NCTC	Pts	Ref
2014	Turner Scott Motorsports	32	Chevy	DAY	MAR; 7	KAN	CLT	DOV; 22	TEX	GTW	KEN	IOW	ELD	POC	MCH	BRI; 9	MSP	CHI	NHA	LVS	TAL	MAR	TEX	PHO; 5	HOM				35th	132	
2016	ThorSport Racing	41	Toyota	DAY; 7	ATL; 6	**MAR**; 16	KAN; 18	DOV; 28	CLT; 17	TEX; 11	IOW; 4	GTW; 2	KEN; 13	ELD; 23	POC; 11	BRI; 30	MCH; 6	MSP; 30	CHI; 25	NHA; 15	LVS; 12	TAL; 24	MAR; 19	TEX; 15	PHO; 14	HOM; 20			14th	387	
2017	ThorSport Racing	27	Toyota	DAY; 12	ATL; 4	MAR; 20	KAN; 23	CLT; 8	DOV; 4*	TEX; 5	GTW; 8	IOW; 14	KEN; 27	ELD; 30	**POC**; 2	MCH; 11	BRI; 5	MSP; 10	CHI; 6	NHA; 7	LVS; 1	TAL; 23	MAR; 9	TEX; 18	PHO; 20	HOM; 19			5th	2263	
2018	ThorSport Racing	41	Ford	DAY; 4	ATL; 4	LVS; 7	**MAR**; 12*	DOV; 8	KAN; 18	CLT; 5	TEX; 16	IOW; 17	GTW; 19	CHI; 2	KEN; 1	**ELD**; 29	POC; 11	MCH; 6	BRI; 7	**MSP**; 14	LVS; 4	TAL; 16	MAR; 4	TEX; 2	PHO; 12	HOM; 10			8th	2254	
2019	ThorSport Racing	99	Ford	DAY; 14	ATL; 5	LVS; 25	MAR; 2	TEX; 10	DOV; 6	KAN; 2	CLT; 4	TEX; 21	IOW; 2	GTW; 8	CHI; 32	KEN; 19	POC; 9	ELD; 14	MCH; 23	BRI; 8	MSP; 3	LVS; 8	TAL; 12	MAR; 16	PHO; 4*	HOM; 12			9th	773	
2020	ThorSport Racing	99	Ford	DAY; 25	LVS; 5	CLT; 10	ATL; 9	HOM; 18	POC; 5	KEN; 2	TEX; 9	KAN; 7	KAN; 5	MCH; 11	DRC; 14	DOV; 5	GTW; 11	DAR; 1	RCH; 3*	BRI; 13	LVS; 23	TAL; 4	KAN; 20	TEX; 20	MAR; 2	PHO; 7			7th	2240	
2021	ThorSport Racing	99	Toyota	DAY; 1	DRC; 1	LVS; 10	ATL; 16	BRD; 2	RCH; 7	KAN; 10	DAR; 2	COA; 10	CLT; 3	TEX; 26	NSH; 7	POC; 17	KNX; 7	GLN; 15	GTW; 3	DAR; 34	BRI; 9	LVS; 2	TAL; 13	MAR; 7	PHO; 3				1st	4034	
2022	ThorSport Racing	99	Toyota	DAY; 2	LVS; 31	ATL; 2	COA; 4	MAR; 5	BRD; 1*	DAR; 25	KAN; 10	TEX; 27	CLT; 10	GTW; 8*	SON; 18	KNX; 10	NSH; 12	MOH; 23	POC; 19	IRP; 2	RCH; 18	KAN; 13	BRI; 18	TAL; 2	HOM; 6	PHO; 2			2nd	4035	
2023	ThorSport Racing	99	Ford	DAY; 11	LVS; 3	ATL; 5	COA; 10	TEX; 10	BRD; 19	MAR; 6	KAN; 16	DAR; 18	NWS; 33	CLT; 1	GTW; 7	NSH; 9	MOH; 5	POC; 9	RCH; 12	IRP; 16	MLW; 16	KAN; 25	BRI; 7	TAL; 2	HOM; 2	PHO; 5			1st	4032	
2024	ThorSport Racing	99	Ford	DAY; 30	ATL; 28	LVS; 13	BRI; 16	COA; 7	MAR; 14	TEX; 24	KAN; 16	DAR; 3	NWS; 22	CLT; 5	GTW; 7	NSH; 7	POC; 18	IRP; 21	RCH; 7	MLW; 9	BRI; 27	KAN; 22	TAL; 35	HOM; 12	MAR; 2	PHO; 9			9th	2150	
2025	ThorSport Racing	99	Ford	**DAY**; 20	ATL; 7	LVS; 14	HOM; 33	MAR; 5	BRI; 5	CAR; 32	TEX; 6	KAN; 11	NWS; 23	CLT; 17	NSH; 14	MCH; 4	POC; 18	LRP; 4	IRP; 11	GLN; 26	RCH; 8	DAR; 11	BRI; 2	NHA; 24	ROV; 36	TAL; 16	MAR; 14	PHO; 29	12th	632	
2026	ThorSport Racing	99	Ford	DAY; 12	ATL; 4*	STP; 3	DAR; 36	CAR; 18	BRI; 11	**TEX**; 5	GLN; 32	DOV; 19	CLT; 4	NSH; 28	MCH; 21	COR; 8	LRP; 31	NWS; 14	IRP; 15	RCH; 18	NHA; 18	BRI; 11	KAN; 5	CLT; 21	PHO; 21	TAL; 17	MAR; 2	HOM; 13	8th	2241	

^{*} Season still in progress
^{1} Ineligible for series points

=== ARCA Racing Series ===
(key) (Bold – Pole position awarded by qualifying time. Italics – Pole position earned by points standings or practice time. * – Most laps led.)

ARCA Racing Series results
Year	Team	No.	Make	1	2	3	4	5	6	7	8	9	10	11	12	13	14	15	16	17	18	19	20	ARSC	Pts	Ref
2014	Venturini Motorsports	55	Toyota	DAY	MOB	SLM	TAL	TOL	NJE	POC	MCH	ELK	WIN	CHI	IRP	POC	BLN	ISF	MAD; 11	DSF	SLM			61st	275	
2014	Turner Scott Motorsports	41	Chevy																			KEN; 27	KAN	61st	275	

==== K&N Pro Series East ====
NASCAR K&N Pro Series East results
Year	Team	No.	Make	1	2	3	4	5	6	7	8	9	10	11	12	13	14	15	16	NKNPSEC	Pts	Ref
2013	Turner Scott Motorsports	41	Chevy	BRI; 9	GRE	FIF	RCH; 35	BGS	IOW; 3	LGY	COL	IOW; 8	VIR	GRE; 6	NHA; 4	DOV; 26	RAL			19th	217	
2014	Turner Scott Motorsports	41	Chevy	NSM; 4	**DAY**; 15	**BRI**; 3*	**GRE**; 1*	RCH; 2	IOW; 1*	**BGS**; 1*	FIF; 1	LGY; 1*	**NHA**; 22	COL; 3	IOW; 7	GLN; 3	VIR; 10	**GRE**; 4	DOV; 15	1st	640	

Sporting positions
Preceded by Dylan Kwasniewski	NASCAR K&N Pro Series East Champion; 2014	Succeeded by William Byron
