= 2021 Chevrolet Silverado 250 =

Race details
- Race 20 of 22 in the 2021 NASCAR Camping World Truck Series season
- Talladega Superspeedway
- Location: Talladega Superspeedway in Lincoln, Alabama
- Course: Permanent racing facility
- Course length: 2.66 miles (4.80 km)
- Distance: 94 laps, 250.50 mi (402.40 km)
- Average speed: 125.119 mph

Pole position
Driver	Ben Rhodes	ThorSport Racing
- Grid positions set by competition-based formula

Most laps led
Driver	Todd Gilliland	Front Row Motorsports
- Laps: 39

Winner
No. 12	Tate Fogleman	Young's Motorsports

Television in the United States
- Network: FS1
- Announcers: Vince Welch, Michael Waltrip, and Kurt Busch

The 2021 Chevrolet Silverado 250 was a NASCAR Camping World Truck Series race that was held on October 2, 2021, at Talladega Superspeedway in Lincoln, Alabama. Contested over 99 laps—extended from 94 laps due to an overtime finish—on the 2.66 mi (4.28 km) asphalt superspeedway, it was the 20th race of the 2021 NASCAR Camping World Truck Series season, the fifth race of the Playoffs, and the second race of the Round of 8. In a wild finish that saw numerous lead changes, Tate Fogleman and John Hunter Nemechek would collide, with Nemechek spinning. Fogleman would then hold off the charging Tyler Hill on the final lap to collect his first career Truck series victory.

== Report ==
=== Background ===
Talladega Superspeedway, originally known as Alabama International Motor Superspeedway (AIMS), is a motorsports complex located north of Talladega, Alabama. It is located on the former Anniston Air Force Base in the small city of Lincoln. The track is a tri-oval and was constructed in the 1960s by NASCAR. Talladega is most known for its steep banking and the unique location of the start/finish line that's located just past the exit to pit road. The track currently hosts the top 3 NASCAR series. Talladega is the longest NASCAR oval with a length of 2.66-mile-long (4.28 km) tri-oval like the Daytona International Speedway, which also is a 2.5-mile-long (4 km) tri-oval.

=== Entry list ===
- (R) denotes rookie driver.
- (i) denotes driver who is ineligible for series driver points.

No.	Driver	Team	Manufacturer
1	Hailie Deegan (R)	David Gilliland Racing	Chevrolet
2	Sheldon Creed	GMS Racing	Chevrolet
02	Kris Wright (R)	Young's Motorsports	Chevrolet
3	Jordan Anderson (i)	Jordan Anderson Racing	Chevrolet
4	John Hunter Nemechek	Kyle Busch Motorsports	Toyota
04	Cory Roper	Roper Racing	Ford
6	Norm Benning	Norm Benning Racing	Chevrolet
9	Codie Rohrbaugh	CR7 Motorsports	Chevrolet
10	Jennifer Jo Cobb	Jennifer Jo Cobb Racing	Ford
11	Clay Greenfield	Spencer Davis Motorsports	Toyota
12	Tate Fogleman	Young's Motorsports	Chevrolet
13	Johnny Sauter	ThorSport Racing	Toyota
15	Tanner Gray	David Gilliland Racing	Ford
16	Austin Hill	Hattori Racing Enterprises	Toyota
18	Chandler Smith (R)	Kyle Busch Motorsports	Toyota
19	Derek Kraus	McAnally–Hilgemann Racing	Toyota
20	Spencer Boyd	Young's Motorsports	Chevrolet
21	Zane Smith	GMS Racing	Chevrolet
22	Austin Wayne Self	AM Racing	Chevrolet
23	Chase Purdy (R)	GMS Racing	Toyota
24	Jack Wood	GMS Racing	Chevrolet
25	Willie Allen	Rackley W.A.R.	Chevrolet
26	Tyler Ankrum	GMS Racing	Chevrolet
28	Bryan Dauzat	FDNY Racing	Chevrolet
30	Danny Bohn	On Point Motorsports	Chevrolet
32	Bret Holmes	Bret Holmes Racing	Chevrolet
33	Jason M. White	Reaume Brothers Racing	Chevrolet
34	Dylan Lupton	Reaume Brothers Racing	Toyota
38	Todd Gilliland	Front Row Motorsports	Ford
40	Ryan Truex	Niece Motorsports	Chevrolet
41	Keith McGee	Cram Racing Enterprises	Toyota
42	Carson Hocevar (R)	Niece Motorsports	Chevrolet
45	Lawless Alan	Niece Motorsports	Chevrolet
51	Drew Dollar	Kyle Busch Motorsports	Toyota
52	Stewart Friesen	Halmar Friesen Racing	Toyota
56	Tyler Hill	Hill Motorsports	Toyota
75	Parker Kligerman	Henderson Motorsports	Chevrolet
88	Matt Crafton	ThorSport Racing	Toyota
98	Grant Enfinger	ThorSport Racing	Toyota
99	Ben Rhodes	ThorSport Racing	Toyota
Official entry list

== Qualifying ==
Ben Rhodes was awarded the pole for the race as determined by competition-based formula.

=== Starting Lineup ===
Pos	No	Driver	Team	Manufacturer
1	99	Ben Rhodes	Thorsport Racing	Toyota
2	38	Todd Gilliland	Front Row Motorsports	Ford
3	88	Matt Crafton	ThorSport Racing	Toyota
4	52	Stewart Friesen	Halmar Friesen Racing	Toyota
5	16	Austin Hill	Hattori Racing Enterprises	Toyota
6	42	Carson Hocevar (R)	Niece Motorsports	Chevrolet
7	4	John Hunter Nemechek	Kyle Busch Motorsports	Toyota
8	21	Zane Smith	GMS Racing	Chevrolet
9	2	Sheldon Creed	GMS Racing	Chevrolet
10	18	Chandler Smith (R)	Kyle Busch Motorsports	Toyota
11	13	Johnny Sauter	ThorSport Racing	Toyota
12	22	Austin Wayne Self	AM Racing	Chevrolet
13	19	Derek Kraus	McAnally–Hilgemann Racing	Toyota
14	40	Ryan Truex	Niece Motorsports	Chevrolet
15	23	Chase Purdy (R)	GMS Racing	Chevrolet
16	02	Kris Wright	Young's Motorsports	Chevrolet
17	98	Grant Enfinger	ThorSport Racing	Toyota
18	51	Drew Dollar	Kyle Busch Motorsports	Toyota
19	32	Bret Holmes	Bret Holmes Racing	Chevrolet
20	12	Tate Fogleman	Young's Motorsports	Chevrolet
21	56	Tyler Hill	Hill Motorsports	Toyota
22	15	Tanner Gray	David Gilliland Racing	Ford
23	30	Danny Bohn	On Point Motorsports	Toyota
24	24	Jack Wood	GMS Racing	Chevrolet
25	34	Dylan Lupton	Reaume Brothers Racing	Toyota
26	1	Hailie Deegan (R)	David Gilliland Racing	Ford
27	26	Tyler Ankrum	GMS Racing	Chevrolet
28	20	Spencer Boyd	Young's Motorsports	Chevrolet
29	9	Codie Rohrbaugh	CR7 Motorsports	Chevrolet
30	25	Willie Allen	Rackley W.A.R.	Chevrolet
31	04	Cory Roper	Roper Racing	Ford
32	11	Clay Greenfield	Spencer Davis Motorsports	Toyota
33	10	Jennifer Jo Cobb	Jennifer Jo Cobb Racing	Ford
34	3	Jordan Anderson	Jordan Anderson Racing	Chevrolet
35	33	Jason M. White	Reaume Brothers Racing	Chevrolet
36	45	Lawless Alan	Niece Motorsports	Chevrolet
37	75	Parker Kligerman	Henderson Motorsports	Chevrolet
38	41	Keith McGee	Cram Racing Enterprises	Toyota
39	6	Norm Benning	Norm Benning Racing	Chevrolet
40	28	Bryan Dauzat	FDNY Racing	Chevrolet
Official qualifying results

== Race ==
=== Race results ===
==== Stage Results ====
Stage One Laps: 20

Pos	No	Driver	Team	Manufacturer	Points
1	99	Ben Rhodes	ThorSport Racing	Toyota	10
2	16	Austin Hill	Hattori Racing Enterprises	Toyota	9
3	88	Matt Crafton	ThorSport Racing	Toyota	8
4	52	Stewart Friesen	Halmar Friesen Racing	Chevrolet	7
5	13	Johnny Sauter	ThorSport Racing	Toyota	6
6	4	John Hunter Nemechek	Kyle Busch Motorsports	Toyota	5
7	51	Drew Dollar	Kyle Busch Motorsports	Toyota	4
8	2	Sheldon Creed	GMS Racing	Chevrolet	3
9	38	Todd Gilliland	Front Row Motorsports	Ford	2
10	22	Austin Wayne Self	AM Racing	Chevrolet	1

Stage Two Laps: 20

Pos	No	Driver	Team	Manufacturer	Points
1	2	Sheldon Creed	GMS Racing	Chevrolet	10
2	13	Johnny Sauter	ThorSport Racing	Toyota	9
3	21	Zane Smith	GMS Racing	Chevrolet	8
4	88	Matt Crafton	ThorSport Racing	Toyota	7
5	16	Austin Hill	Hattori Racing Enterprises	Toyota	6
6	18	Chandler Smith	Kyle Busch Motorsports	Toyota	5
7	15	Tanner Gray	David Gilliland Racing	Ford	4
8	4	John Hunter Nemechek	Kyle Busch Motorsports	Toyota	3
9	52	Stewart Friesen	Halmar Friesen Racing	Toyota	2
10	32	Bret Holmes	Bret Holmes Racing	Chevrolet	1

=== Final Stage Results ===
Laps: 54

Pos	Grid	No	Driver	Team	Manufacturer	Laps	Points	Status
1	20	12	Tate Fogleman	Young's Motorsports	Chevrolet	99	40	Running
2	21	56	Tyler Hill	Hill Motorsports	Chevrolet	99	35	Running
3	2	38	Todd Gilliland	Front Row Motorsports	Ford	99	36	Running
4	7	4	John Hunter Nemechek	Kyle Busch Motorsports	Toyota	99	41	Running
5	14	40	Ryan Truex	Niece Motorsports	Chevrolet	99	32	Running
6	31	04	Cory Roper	Roper Racing	Ford	99	31	Running
7	28	20	Spencer Boyd	Young's Motorsports	Chevrolet	99	30	Running
8	23	30	Danny Bohn	On Point Motorsports	Toyota	99	29	Running
9	15	23	Chase Purdy	GMS Racing	Chevrolet	99	28	Running
10	38	41	Keith McGee	Cram Racing Enterprises	Toyota	99	27	Running
11	34	3	Jordan Anderson	Jordan Anderson Racing	Chevrolet	99	26	Running
12	9	2	Sheldon Creed	GMS Racing	Chevrolet	99	38	Running
13	1	99	Ben Rhodes	ThorSport Racing	Toyota	99	34	Running
14	3	88	Matt Crafton	ThorSport Racing	Toyota	99	38	Running
15	19	32	Bret Holmes	Bret Holmes Racing	Chevrolet	99	23	Running
16	29	9	Codie Rohrbaugh	CR7 Motorsports	Chevrolet	98	21	Accident
17	39	6	Norm Benning	Norm Benning Racing	Chevrolet	98	20	Running
18	30	25	Willie Allen	Rackley W.A.R.	Chevrolet	94	19	Running
19	10	18	Chandler Smith	Kyle Busch Motorsports	Toyota	92	23	Running
20	13	19	Derek Kraus	McAnally–Hilgemann Racing	Toyota	90	17	Running
21	17	98	Grant Enfinger	ThorSport Racing	Toyota	78	16	Accident
22	4	52	Stewart Friesen	Halmar Friesen Racing	Toyota	76	24	DVP
23	32	11	Clay Greenfield	Spencer Davis Motorsports	Toyota	75	14	Accident
24	26	1	Hailie Deegan	David Gilliland Racing	Ford	75	13	Accident
25	6	42	Carson Hocevar	Niece Motorsports	Chevrolet	75	12	Accident
26	25	34	Dylan Lupton	Reaume Brothers Racing	Toyota	71	11	Accident
27	35	33	Jason M. White	Reaume Brothers Racing	Chevrolet	66	10	DVP
28	27	26	Tyler Ankrum	GMS Racing	Chevrolet	65	9	DVP
29	12	22	Austin Wayne Self	AM Racing	Chevrolet	63	9	Electrical
30	11	13	Johnny Sauter	ThorSport Racing	Toyota	61	22	Accident
31	33	10	Jennifer Jo Cobb	Jennifer Jo Cobb Racing	Ford	58	6	Accident
32	5	16	Austin Hill	Hattori Racing Enterprises	Toyota	57	20	Accident
33	8	21	Zane Smith	GMS Racing	Chevrolet	57	12	Accident
34	22	15	Tanner Gray	David Gilliland Racing	Ford	57	7	Accident
35	18	51	Drew Dollar	Kyle Busch Motorsports	Toyota	57	6	Accident
36	16	02	Kris Wright	Young's Motorsports	Chevrolet	57	1	Accident
37	37	75	Parker Kligerman	Henderson Motorsports	Chevrolet	57	1	Accident
38	36	45	Lawless Alan	Niece Motorsports	Chevrolet	57	1	Accident
39	40	28	Bryan Dauzat	FDNY Racing	Chevrolet	27	1	Accident
40	24	24	Jack Wood	GMS Racing	Chevrolet	23	1	Engine
Official race results

=== Race statistics ===
- Lead changes: 23 among 12 different drivers
- Cautions/Laps: 6 for 29
- Time of race: 2 hours, 6 minutes, and 17 seconds
- Average speed: 125.119 mph (201.360 km/h)

Previous race: 2021 Victoria's Voice Foundation 200	NASCAR Camping World Truck Series; 2021 season	Next race: 2021 United Rentals 200
