= 2026 Love's RV Stop 225 =

NASCAR Craftsman Truck Series race at Talladega Superspeedway

Race details
- Race 23 of 25 of the 2026 NASCAR Craftsman Truck Series
- Date: October 23, 2026
- Location: Talladega Superspeedway in Lincoln, Alabama
- Course: Permanent racing facility
- Course length: 2.66 miles (4.28 km)
- Distance: 86 laps, 228.76 mi (368.153 km)
- Scheduled distance: 85 laps, 226.1 mi (363.9 km)
- Average speed: 120.224 miles per hour (193.482 km/h)

Pole position
Driver	Ty Majeski	ThorSport Racing
- Time: 53.983

Most laps led
Driver	Sammy Smith	Spire Motorsports
- Laps: 21

Fastest lap
Driver	Dawson Sutton	Rackley W.A.R.
- Time: 49.448

Winner
No. 7	Sammy Smith	Spire Motorsports

Television in the United States
- Network: FS1
- Announcers: Brent Stover, Michael Waltrip, and Brad Keselowski

Radio in the United States
- Radio: NRN
- Booth announcers: Alex Hayden, Mike Bagley and Todd Gordon
- Turn announcers: Dave Moody (1 & 2), Tim Catalfamo (Backstretch), and Dan Hubbard (3 & 4)

The 2026 Love's RV Stop 225 was a NASCAR Craftsman Truck Series race held on Friday, October 23, 2026, at Talladega Superspeedway in Lincoln, Alabama. Contested over 85 laps on the 2.66 mile (4.28 km) superspeedway, it was the 23rd race of the 2026 NASCAR Craftsman Truck Series season, the fifth race in the NASCAR Chase, and the 21st running of the event.

In a wild and wreck-filled race, Sammy Smith, driving for Spire Motorsports, survived last lap chaos and held off the field in a four-wide photo finish for second, earning his first career NASCAR Craftsman Truck Series win. Smith also led the race-high 21 laps after starting in second. Gio Ruggiero won the first stage, while Tanner Gray won the second stage. At race's end, Tyler Ankrum finished second, and Austin Green finished third. Pole-sitter Ty Majeski and Kaden Honeycutt rounded out the top five, while Landen Lewis, Brenden Queen, Layne Riggs, Spencer Boyd, and Corey Heim rounded out the top ten.

Following the race, Ruggiero, Daniel Hemric, Ben Rhodes, Tyler Ankrum, and Grant Enfinger were mathimatically eliminated from championship contention.

This was the final Truck Series race for Rackley W.A.R., as they would shut down their program following the conclusion of this race, focusing more on their late model efforts.

== Report ==
=== Background ===
Talladega Superspeedway, the track where the race was held.

Talladega Superspeedway, formerly known as Alabama International Motor Speedway, is a motorsports complex located north of Talladega, Alabama. It is located on the former Anniston Air Force Base in the small city of Lincoln. A tri-oval, the track was constructed in 1969 by the International Speedway Corporation, a business controlled by the France family. Talladega is most known for its steep banking. The track currently hosts NASCAR's Cup Series, O'Reilly Auto Parts Series, and Craftsman Truck Series. Talladega is the longest NASCAR oval with a length of 2.66-mile-long (4.28 km) tri-oval like the Daytona International Speedway, which is 2.5-mile-long (4.0 km).

==== Entry list ====
- (R) denotes rookie driver.
- (i) denotes driver who is ineligible for series driver points.
- (CC) denotes chase contender.
- (OC) denotes owners' chase contender truck.

#	Driver	Team	Make
1	Corey Heim (OC)	Tricon Garage	Toyota
2	Jason White	Team Reaume	Ford
4	Garrett Mitchell (i)	Niece Motorsports	Chevrolet
5	Thomas Annunziata	Tricon Garage	Toyota
6	Norm Benning	Norm Benning Racing	Chevrolet
7	Sammy Smith (OC)	Spire Motorsports	Chevrolet
9	Grant Enfinger (CC)	CR7 Motorsports	Chevrolet
10	Corey LaJoie	Kaulig Racing	Ram
11	Kaden Honeycutt (CC)	Tricon Garage	Toyota
12	Brenden Queen (R)	Kaulig Racing	Ram
13	Cole Butcher (R)	ThorSport Racing	Ford
14	Mini Tyrrell (R)	Kaulig Racing	Ram
15	Tanner Gray	Tricon Garage	Toyota
16	Justin Haley	Kaulig Racing	Ram
17	Gio Ruggiero (CC)	Tricon Garage	Toyota
18	Tyler Ankrum (CC)	McAnally–Hilgemann Racing	Chevrolet
19	Daniel Hemric (CC)	McAnally–Hilgemann Racing	Chevrolet
22	Josh Reaume	Team Reaume	Ford
25	Tony Stewart	Kaulig Racing	Ram
26	Dawson Sutton	Rackley W.A.R.	Chevrolet
28	Bryan Dauzat	FDNY Racing	Chevrolet
33	Frankie Muniz	Team Reaume	Ford
34	Layne Riggs (CC)	Front Row Motorsports	Ford
38	Chandler Smith (CC)	Front Row Motorsports	Ford
42	Conner Jones	Niece Motorsports	Chevrolet
44	Andrés Pérez de Lara	Niece Motorsports	Chevrolet
45	Landen Lewis (OC)	Niece Motorsports	Chevrolet
52	Stewart Friesen	Halmar Friesen Racing	Toyota
56	Timmy Hill	Hill Motorsports	Toyota
62	Cory Roper	Halmar Friesen Racing	Toyota
76	Spencer Boyd	Freedom Racing Enterprises	Chevrolet
77	Austin Green (OC) (i)	Spire Motorsports	Chevrolet
81	Kris Wright	McAnally–Hilgemann Racing	Chevrolet
88	Ty Majeski (CC)	ThorSport Racing	Ford
91	Christian Eckes (CC)	McAnally–Hilgemann Racing	Chevrolet
95	Clay Greenfield	GK Racing	Chevrolet
98	Jake Garcia	ThorSport Racing	Ford
99	Ben Rhodes (CC)	ThorSport Racing	Ford
Official entry list

== Qualifying ==
Qualifying was held on Friday, October 23, at 11:30 AM CST. Since Talladega Superspeedway is a superspeedway, the qualifying procedure used was a single-car, single-lap system with two rounds. In the first round, drivers had one lap to set a time and determined positions 11-38. The fastest ten drivers from the first round advanced to the second round, and whoever set the fastest time in Round 2 won the pole and determined the rest of the starting lineup.

Ty Majeski, driving for ThorSport Racing, qualified on pole position, having advanced from the preliminary round and set the fastest time in Round 2, with a lap of 53.983 seconds, and a speed of 177.389 miles per hour (285.480 km/h).

Two drivers failed to qualify: Norm Benning and Bryan Dauzat.

=== Qualifying results ===
Pos.	#	Driver	Team	Make	Time (R1)	Speed (R1)	Time (R2)	Speed (R2)
1	88	Ty Majeski (CC)	ThorSport Racing	Ford	54.014	177.287	53.983	177.389
2	7	Sammy Smith (OC) (i)	Spire Motorsports	Chevrolet	54.346	176.204	54.049	177.173
3	11	Kaden Honeycutt (CC)	Tricon Garage	Toyota	54.354	176.178	54.201	176.676
4	17	Gio Ruggiero (CC)	Tricon Garage	Toyota	54.211	176.643	54.204	176.666
5	13	Cole Butcher (R)	ThorSport Racing	Ford	54.378	176.101	54.235	176.565
6	77	Austin Green (OC) (i)	Spire Motorsports	Chevrolet	54.204	176.666	54.309	176.324
7	18	Tyler Ankrum (CC)	McAnally–Hilgemann Racing	Chevrolet	54.337	176.234	54.372	176.120
8	1	Corey Heim (OC)	Tricon Garage	Toyota	54.439	175.903	54.456	175.848
9	34	Layne Riggs (CC)	Front Row Motorsports	Ford	54.507	175.684	54.592	175.410
10	99	Ben Rhodes (CC)	ThorSport Racing	Ford	54.483	175.761	54.729	174.971
Eliminated in Round 1
11	98	Jake Garcia	ThorSport Racing	Ford	54.548	175.552	—	—
12	81	Kris Wright	McAnally–Hilgemann Racing	Chevrolet	54.556	175.526	—	—
13	15	Tanner Gray	Tricon Garage	Toyota	54.603	175.375	—	—
14	38	Chandler Smith (CC)	Front Row Motorsports	Ford	54.652	175.218	—	—
15	52	Stewart Friesen	Halmar Friesen Racing	Toyota	54.654	175.211	—	—
16	62	Cory Roper	Halmar Friesen Racing	Toyota	54.690	175.096	—	—
17	16	Justin Haley	Kaulig Racing	Ram	54.705	175.048	—	—
18	9	Grant Enfinger (CC)	CR7 Motorsports	Chevrolet	54.739	174.939	—	—
19	5	Thomas Annunziata	Tricon Garage	Toyota	54.763	174.863	—	—
20	91	Christian Eckes (CC)	McAnally–Hilgemann Racing	Chevrolet	54.775	174.824	—	—
21	95	Clay Greenfield	GK Racing	Chevrolet	54.790	174.776	—	—
22	10	Corey LaJoie	Kaulig Racing	Ram	54.833	174.639	—	—
23	14	Mini Tyrrell (R)	Kaulig Racing	Ram	54.838	174.623	—	—
24	4	Cleetus McFarland (i)	Niece Motorsports	Chevrolet	54.889	174.461	—	—
25	44	Andrés Pérez de Lara	Niece Motorsports	Chevrolet	54.898	174.433	—	—
26	26	Dawson Sutton	Rackley W.A.R.	Chevrolet	54.901	174.423	—	—
27	19	Daniel Hemric (CC)	McAnally–Hilgemann Racing	Chevrolet	54.918	174.369	—	—
28	42	Conner Jones	Niece Motorsports	Chevrolet	54.941	174.296	—	—
29	25	Tony Stewart	Kaulig Racing	Ram	55.023	174.036	—	—
30	45	Landen Lewis (OC)	Niece Motorsports	Chevrolet	55.042	173.976	—	—
31	33	Frankie Muniz	Team Reaume	Ford	55.101	173.790	—	—
Qualified by owner's points
32	76	Spencer Boyd	Freedom Racing Enterprises	Chevrolet	55.152	173.629	—	—
33	22	Josh Reaume	Team Reaume	Ford	55.155	173.620	—	—
34	2	Jason White	Team Reaume	Ford	55.181	173.538	—	—
35	56	Timmy Hill	Hill Motorsports	Toyota	55.253	173.312	—	—
36	12	Brenden Queen (R)	Kaulig Racing	Ram	—	—	—	—
Failed to qualify
37	6	Norm Benning	Norm Benning Racing	Chevrolet	55.468	172.640	—	—
38	28	Bryan Dauzat	FDNY Racing	Chevrolet	56.343	169.959	—	—
Official qualifying results
Official starting lineup

== Race ==
=== Race results ===
==== Stage Results ====
Stage One Laps: 20

Pos.	#	Driver	Team	Make	Pts
1	17	Gio Ruggiero (CC)	Tricon Garage	Toyota	10
2	11	Kaden Honeycutt (CC)	Tricon Garage	Toyota	9
3	77	Austin Green (OC) (i)	Spire Motorsports	Chevrolet	0
4	1	Corey Heim (OC)	Tricon Garage	Toyota	7
5	34	Layne Riggs (CC)	Front Row Motorsports	Ford	6
6	99	Ben Rhodes (CC)	ThorSport Racing	Ford	5
7	15	Tanner Gray	Tricon Garage	Toyota	4
8	88	Ty Majeski (CC)	ThorSport Racing	Ford	3
9	7	Sammy Smith (OC) (i)	Spire Motorsports	Chevrolet	0
10	14	Mini Tyrrell (R)	Kaulig Racing	Ram	1

Stage Two Laps: 20

Pos.	#	Driver	Team	Make	Pts
1	15	Tanner Gray	Tricon Garage	Toyota	10
2	34	Layne Riggs (CC)	Front Row Motorsports	Ford	9
3	99	Ben Rhodes (CC)	ThorSport Racing	Ford	8
4	11	Kaden Honeycutt (CC)	Tricon Garage	Toyota	7
5	88	Ty Majeski (CC)	ThorSport Racing	Ford	6
6	45	Landen Lewis (OC)	Niece Motorsports	Chevrolet	5
7	26	Dawson Sutton	Rackley W.A.R.	Chevrolet	4
8	77	Austin Green (OC) (i)	Spire Motorsports	Chevrolet	0
9	16	Justin Haley	Kaulig Racing	Ram	2
10	12	Brenden Queen (R)	Kaulig Racing	Ram	1

=== Final Stage Results ===
Stage Three Laps: 46

Fin	St	#	Driver	Team	Make	Laps	Led	Status	Pts
1	2	7	Sammy Smith (OC) (i)	Spire Motorsports	Chevrolet	86	21	Running	0
2	7	18	Tyler Ankrum (CC)	McAnally–Hilgemann Racing	Chevrolet	86	0	Running	35
3	6	77	Austin Green (OC) (i)	Spire Motorsports	Chevrolet	86	14	Running	0
4	1	88	Ty Majeski (CC)	ThorSport Racing	Ford	86	7	Running	42
5	3	11	Kaden Honeycutt (CC)	Tricon Garage	Toyota	86	8	Running	48
6	30	45	Landen Lewis (OC)	Niece Motorsports	Chevrolet	86	0	Running	36
7	36	12	Brenden Queen (R)	Kaulig Racing	Ram	86	0	Running	31
8	9	34	Layne Riggs (CC)	Front Row Motorsports	Ford	86	6	Running	44
9	32	76	Spencer Boyd	Freedom Racing Enterprises	Chevrolet	86	0	Running	28
10	8	1	Corey Heim (OC)	Tricon Garage	Toyota	86	0	Running	34
11	13	15	Tanner Gray	Tricon Garage	Toyota	86	9	Running	40
12	31	33	Frankie Muniz	Team Reaume	Ford	86	0	Running	25
13	34	2	Jason White	Team Reaume	Ford	86	0	Running	24
14	14	38	Chandler Smith (CC)	Front Row Motorsports	Ford	86	0	Running	23
15	21	95	Clay Greenfield	GK Racing	Chevrolet	86	0	Running	22
16	35	56	Timmy Hill	Hill Motorsports	Toyota	86	1	Running	21
17	10	99	Ben Rhodes (CC)	ThorSport Racing	Ford	86	3	Running	33
18	16	62	Cory Roper	Halmar Friesen Racing	Toyota	85	0	Accident	19
19	26	26	Dawson Sutton	Rackley W.A.R.	Chevrolet	85	1	Running	23
20	17	16	Justin Haley	Kaulig Racing	Ram	84	2	Running	19
21	20	91	Christian Eckes (CC)	McAnally–Hilgemann Racing	Chevrolet	83	0	Running	16
22	33	22	Josh Reaume	Team Reaume	Ford	82	1	Running	15
23	19	5	Thomas Annunziata	Tricon Garage	Toyota	78	1	Accident	14
24	18	9	Grant Enfinger (CC)	CR7 Motorsports	Chevrolet	78	4	Accident	13
25	4	17	Gio Ruggiero (CC)	Tricon Garage	Toyota	57	5	Running	22
26	11	98	Jake Garcia	ThorSport Racing	Ford	56	3	Accident	11
27	28	42	Conner Jones	Niece Motorsports	Chevrolet	56	0	Accident	10
28	23	14	Mini Tyrrell (R)	Kaulig Racing	Ram	48	0	Radiator	10
29	5	13	Cole Butcher (R)	ThorSport Racing	Ford	43	0	Accident	8
30	15	52	Stewart Friesen	Halmar Friesen Racing	Toyota	16	0	Accident	7
31	25	44	Andrés Pérez de Lara	Niece Motorsports	Chevrolet	16	0	Accident	6
32	12	81	Kris Wright	McAnally–Hilgemann Racing	Chevrolet	16	0	Accident	5
33	22	10	Corey LaJoie	Kaulig Racing	Ram	16	0	Accident	4
34	29	25	Tony Stewart	Kaulig Racing	Ram	16	0	Accident	3
35	27	19	Daniel Hemric (CC)	McAnally–Hilgemann Racing	Chevrolet	16	0	Accident	2
36	24	4	Cleetus McFarland (i)	Niece Motorsports	Chevrolet	16	0	Accident	0
Official race results

=== Race statistics ===
- Lead changes: 32 among 15 different drivers
- Cautions/Laps: 5 for 26 laps
- Red flags: 1
- Time of race: 1 hour, 54 minutes and 10 seconds
- Average speed: 120.224 miles per hour (193.482 km/h)

== Standings after the race ==
Drivers' Championship standings

	Pos	Driver	Points
	1	Kaden Honeycutt	2,371
	2	Layne Riggs	2,328 (–43)
2	3	Ty Majeski	2,230 (–141)
	4	Chandler Smith	2,229 (–142)
2	5	Christian Eckes	2,227 (–144)
1	6	Gio Ruggiero	2,194 (–177)
1	7	Daniel Hemric	2,177 (–194)
1	8	Ben Rhodes	2,168 (–203)
1	9	Tyler Ankrum	2,157 (–214)
2	10	Grant Enfinger	2,152 (–219)
Official driver's standings

Manufacturers' Championship standings

Pos	Manufacturer	Points
1	Ford	965
2	Toyota	939 (–26)
3	Chevrolet	885 (–80)
4	Ram	595 (–370)

- Note: Only the first 10 positions are included for the driver standings.

Previous race: 2026 Zero Carbon Bioethanol 150	NASCAR Craftsman Truck Series; 2026 season	Next race: 2026 Black's Tire 200 (Martinsville)
