= 2021 United Rentals 200 =

Race details
- Race 21 of 22 in the 2021 NASCAR Camping World Truck Series season
- Martinsville Speedway
- Date: October 30, 2021
- Location: Martinsville Speedway in Martinsville, Virginia
- Course: Permanent racing facility
- Course length: 0.526 miles (0.85 km)
- Distance: 200 laps, 105.2 mi (169.302 km)
- Average speed: 56.402 mph

Pole position
Driver	John Hunter Nemechek	Kyle Busch Motorsports
- Grid positions set by competition-based formula

Most laps led
Driver	Todd Gilliland	Front Row Motorsports
- Laps: 133

Winner
No. 21	Zane Smith	GMS Racing

Television in the United States
- Network: FS1
- Announcers: Vince Welch, Michael Waltrip, and Kurt Busch

The 2021 United Rentals 200 was a NASCAR Camping World Truck Series race that was held on October 30, 2021, at Martinsville Speedway in Martinsville, Virginia. Contested over 200 laps on the 0.526 mi (0.847 km) paper-clipped shaped oval, it was the 21st race of the 2021 NASCAR Camping World Truck Series season, the sixth race of the Playoffs, and the final race of the Round of 8. GMS Racing driver Zane Smith collected his first win of the season, advancing him to the championship race. Along with Smith, John Hunter Nemechek, Ben Rhodes, and Matt Crafton advanced as well.

== Report ==
=== Background ===
Martinsville Speedway is a NASCAR-owned stock car racing track located in Henry County, in Ridgeway, Virginia, just to the south of Martinsville. At 0.526 miles (0.847 km) in length. The track was also one of the first paved oval tracks in NASCAR, being built in 1947 by H. Clay Earles. It is also the only remaining race track that has been on the NASCAR circuit from its beginning in 1948.

=== Entry list ===
- (R) denotes rookie driver.
- (i) denotes driver who is ineligible for series driver points.

No.	Driver	Team	Manufacturer
1	Hailie Deegan (R)	David Gilliland Racing	Chevrolet
2	Sheldon Creed	GMS Racing	Chevrolet
02	Kris Wright (R)	Young's Motorsports	Chevrolet
3	Sage Karam (i)	Jordan Anderson Racing	Chevrolet
4	John Hunter Nemechek	Kyle Busch Motorsports	Toyota
04	Cory Roper	Roper Racing	Ford
6	Norm Benning	Norm Benning Racing	Chevrolet
9	Colby Howard (i)	CR7 Motorsports	Chevrolet
10	Jennifer Jo Cobb	Jennifer Jo Cobb Racing	Ford
11	Spencer Davis	Spencer Davis Motorsports	Toyota
12	Tate Fogleman	Young's Motorsports	Chevrolet
13	Johnny Sauter	ThorSport Racing	Toyota
15	Tanner Gray	David Gilliland Racing	Ford
16	Austin Hill	Hattori Racing Enterprises	Toyota
17	Taylor Gray	David Gilliland Racing	Ford
18	Chandler Smith (R)	Kyle Busch Motorsports	Toyota
19	Derek Kraus	McAnally–Hilgemann Racing	Toyota
20	Spencer Boyd	Young's Motorsports	Chevrolet
21	Zane Smith	GMS Racing	Chevrolet
22	Austin Wayne Self	AM Racing	Chevrolet
23	Chase Purdy (R)	GMS Racing	Toyota
24	Jack Wood	GMS Racing	Chevrolet
25	Josh Berry (i)	Rackley W.A.R.	Chevrolet
26	Tyler Ankrum	GMS Racing	Chevrolet
30	Danny Bohn	On Point Motorsports	Chevrolet
32	Bret Holmes	Bret Holmes Racing	Chevrolet
33	Jesse Iwuji	Reaume Brothers Racing	Chevrolet
34	Josh Reaume	Reaume Brothers Racing	Toyota
38	Todd Gilliland	Front Row Motorsports	Ford
40	Ryan Truex	Niece Motorsports	Chevrolet
41	Dawson Cram	Cram Racing Enterprises	Toyota
42	Carson Hocevar (R)	Niece Motorsports	Chevrolet
45	Chris Hacker	Niece Motorsports	Chevrolet
49	Roger Reuse	CMI Motorsports	Ford
51	Corey Heim	Kyle Busch Motorsports	Toyota
52	Stewart Friesen	Halmar Friesen Racing	Toyota
56	Timmy Hill	Hill Motorsports	Toyota
75	Parker Kligerman	Henderson Motorsports	Chevrolet
88	Matt Crafton	ThorSport Racing	Toyota
98	Grant Enfinger	ThorSport Racing	Toyota
99	Ben Rhodes	ThorSport Racing	Toyota
Official entry list

== Qualifying ==
John Hunter Nemechek was awarded the pole for the race as determined by competition-based formula. Norm Benning did not have enough points to qualify.

=== Starting Lineups ===
Pos	No	Driver	Team	Manufacturer
1	4	John Hunter Nemechek	Kyle Busch Motorsports	Toyota
2	38	Todd Gilliland	Front Row Motorsports	Ford
3	99	Ben Rhodes	ThorSport Racing	Toyota
4	2	Sheldon Creed	GMS Racing	Chevrolet
5	88	Matt Crafton	ThorSport Racing	Toyota
6	18	Chandler Smith (R)	Kyle Busch Motorsports	Toyota
7	52	Stewart Friesen	Halmar Friesen Racing	Toyota
8	42	Carson Hocevar (R)	Niece Motorsports	Chevrolet
9	21	Zane Smith	GMS Racing	Chevrolet
10	16	Austin Hill	Hattori Racing Enterprises	Toyota
11	40	Ryan Truex	Niece Motorsports	Chevrolet
12	12	Tate Fogleman	Young's Motorsports	Chevrolet
13	23	Chase Purdy	GMS Racing	Chevrolet
14	30	Danny Bohn	On Point Motorsports	Toyota
15	98	Grant Enfinger	ThorSport Racing	Toyota
16	04	Cory Roper	Roper Racing	Ford
17	19	Derek Kraus	McAnally–Hilgemann Racing	Toyota
18	20	Spencer Boyd	Young's Motorsports	Chevrolet
19	26	Tyler Ankrum	GMS Racing	Chevrolet
20	32	Bret Holmes	Bret Holmes Racing	Chevrolet
21	22	Austin Wayne Self	AM Racing	Chevrolet
22	13	Johnny Sauter	ThorSport Racing	Toyota
23	1	Hailie Deegan (R)	David Gilliland Racing	Ford
24	56	Tyler Hill	Hill Motorsports	Toyota
25	25	Josh Berry (R)	Rackley W.A.R.	Chevrolet
26	02	Kris Wright	Young's Motorsports	Chevrolet
27	15	Tanner Gray	David Gilliland Racing	Ford
28	51	Corey Heim	Kyle Busch Motorsports	Toyota
29	9	Colby Howard (i)	CR7 Motorsports	Chevrolet
30	75	Parker Kligerman	Henderson Motorsports	Toyota
31	3	Sage Karam (i)	Jordan Anderson Racing	Chevrolet
32	10	Jennifer Jo Cobb	Jennifer Jo Cobb Racing	Ford
33	41	Dawson Cram	Cram Racing Enterprises	Toyota
34	24	Jack Wood	GMS Racing	Chevrolet
35	34	Josh Reaume	Reaume Brothers Racing	Toyota
36	11	Spencer Davis	Spencer Davis Motorsports	Toyota
37	45	Chris Hacker	Niece Motorsports	Chevrolet
38	33	Jesse Iwuji	Reaume Brothers Racing	Chevrolet
39	17	Taylor Gray	David Gilliland Racing	Ford
40	49	Roger Reuse	CMI Motorsports	Ford
Official qualifying results

== Race ==
=== Race results ===
==== Stage Results ====
Stage One Laps: 50

Pos	No	Driver	Team	Manufacturer	Points
1	38	Todd Gilliland	Front Row Motorsports	Ford	10
2	2	Sheldon Creed	GMS Racing	Chevrolet	9
3	4	John Hunter Nemechek	Kyle Busch Motorsports	Toyota	8
4	99	Ben Rhodes	ThorSport Racing	Toyota	7
5	88	Matt Crafton	ThorSport Racing	Toyota	6
6	21	Zane Smith	GMS Racing	Chevrolet	5
7	52	Stewart Friesen	Halmar Friesen Racing	Toyota	4
8	13	Johnny Sauter	ThorSport Racing	Toyota	3
9	42	Carson Hocevar (R)	Niece Motorsports	Chevrolet	2
10	16	Austin Hill	Hattori Racing Enterprises	Toyota	1

Stage Two Laps: 50

Pos	No	Driver	Team	Manufacturer	Points
1	38	Todd Gilliland	Front Row Motorsports	Ford	10
2	4	John Hunter Nemechek	Kyle Busch Motorsports	Toyota	9
3	2	Sheldon Creed	GMS Racing	Chevrolet	8
4	13	Johnny Sauter	ThorSport Racing	Toyota	7
5	88	Matt Crafton	ThorSport Racing	Toyota	6
6	99	Ben Rhodes	ThorSport Racing	Toyota	5
7	17	Taylor Gray	David Gilliland Racing	Ford	4
8	21	Zane Smith	GMS Racing	Chevrolet	3
9	42	Carson Hocevar (R)	Niece Motorsports	Chevrolet	2
10	52	Stewart Friesen	Halmar Friesen Racing	Toyota	1

=== Final Stage Results ===
Laps:

Pos	Grid	No	Driver	Team	Manufacturer	Laps	Points	Status
1	9	21	Zane Smith	GMS Racing	Chevrolet	204	48	Running
2	10	16	Austin Hill	Hattori Racing Enterprises	Toyota	204	36	Running
3	27	15	Tanner Gray	David Gilliland Racing	Ford	204	34	Running
4	6	18	Chandler Smith	Kyle Busch Motorsports	Toyota	204	33	Running
5	5	88	Matt Crafton	ThorSport Racing	Toyota	204	44	Running
6	30	75	Parker Kligerman	Henderson Motorsports	Toyota	204	31	Running
7	3	99	Ben Rhodes	ThorSport Racing	Toyota	204	42	Running
8	39	17	Taylor Gray	David Gilliland Racing	Ford	204	33	Running
9	4	2	Sheldon Creed	GMS Racing	Chevrolet	204	45	Running
10	24	56	Timmy Hill	Hill Motorsports	Chevrolet	204	27	Running
11	28	51	Corey Heim	Kyle Busch Motorsports	Toyota	204	26	Running
12	8	42	Carson Hocevar (R)	Niece Motorsports	Chevrolet	206	29	Running
13	26	02	Kris Wright	Young's Motorsports	Chevrolet	204	24	Running
14	14	30	Danny Bohn	On Point Motorsports	Toyota	204	23	Running
15	18	20	Spencer Boyd	Young's Motorsports	Chevrolet	204	22	Running
16	37	45	Chris Hacker	Niece Motorsports	Chevrolet	204	21	Running
17	7	52	Stewart Friesen	Halmar Friesen Racing	Toyota	204	25	Running
18	12	12	Tate Fogleman	Young's Motorsports	Chevrolet	204	19	Running
19	23	1	Hailie Deegan (R)	David Gilliland Racing	Ford	204	18	Running
20	21	22	Austin Wayne Self	AM Racing	Chevrolet	204	17	Running
21	15	98	Grant Enfinger	ThorSport Racing	Toyota	204	16	Running
22	20	32	Bret Holmes	Bret Holmes Racing	Chevrolet	204	15	Running
23	33	41	Dawson Cram	Cram Racing Enterprises	Chevrolet	204	14	Running
24	17	19	Derek Kraus	McAnally–Hilgemann Racing	Toyota	204	13	Running
25	2	38	Todd Gilliland	Front Row Motorsports	Ford	203	32	Running
26	19	26	Tyler Ankrum	GMS Racing	Chevrolet	203	11	Running
27	34	24	Jack Wood	GMS Racing	Chevrolet	203	10	Running
28	25	25	Josh Berry (i)	Rackley W.A.R.	Chevrolet	203	0	Running
29	36	11	Spencer Davis	Spencer Davis Motorsports	Toyota	202	8	Running
30	38	33	Jesse Iwuji	Reaume Brothers Racing	Toyota	202	7	Running
31	22	13	Johnny Sauter	ThorSport Racing	Toyota	201	16	Running
32	31	3	Sage Karam (i)	Jordan Anderson Racing	Chevrolet	200	0	Running
33	11	40	Ryan Truex	Niece Motorsports	Chevrolet	198	4	
34	35	34	Josh Reaume	Reaume Brothers Racing	Toyota	198	3	Running
35	40	49	Roger Reuse	CMI Motorsports	Ford	193	2	Running
36	32	10	Jennifer Jo Cobb	Jennifer Jo Cobb Racing	Ford	190	1	Running
37	16	04	Cory Roper	Roper Racing	Ford	188	1	Running
38	29	9	Colby Howard (i)	CR7 Motorsports	Chevrolet	174	0	Running
39	1	4	John Hunter Nemechek	Kyle Busch Motorsports	Toyota	129	18	Accident
40	13	23	Chase Purdy	GMS Racing	Chevrolet	33	1	Rear gear
Official race results

=== Race statistics ===
- Lead changes: 10 among 4 different drivers
- Cautions/Laps: 14 for 89
- Time of race: 1 hours, 54 minutes, and 9 seconds
- Average speed: 56.402 mph (90.770 km/h)

Previous race: 2021 Chevrolet Silverado 250	NASCAR Camping World Truck Series; 2021 season	Next race: 2021 Lucas Oil 150
