= 2023 Craftsman 150 =

23rd race of the 2023 NASCAR Craftsman Truck Series

Race details
- Race 23 of 23 of the 2023 NASCAR Craftsman Truck Series
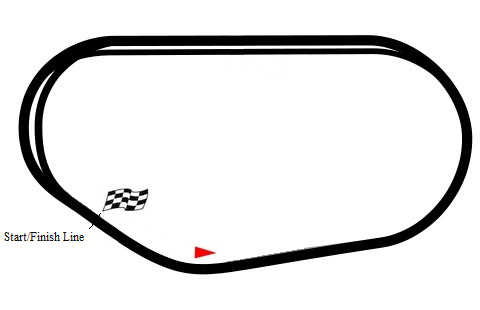
- Date: November 3, 2023
- Location: Phoenix Raceway, Avondale, Arizona
- Course: Permanent racing facility
- Course length: 1 miles (1.6 km)
- Distance: 179 laps, 179 mi (288 km)
- Scheduled distance: 150 laps, 150 mi (241 km)
- Average speed: 72.797 mph (117.155 km/h)

Pole position
Driver	Corey Heim	Tricon Garage
- Time: 26.344

Most laps led
Driver	Ty Majeski	ThorSport Racing
- Laps: 48

Winner
No. 19	Christian Eckes	McAnally-Hilgemann Racing

Television in the United States
- Network: FS1
- Announcers: Jamie Little, Phil Parsons, and Michael Waltrip

Radio in the United States
- Radio: MRN

The 2023 Craftsman 150 was the 23rd and final stock car race of the 2023 NASCAR Craftsman Truck Series, the Championship 4 race, and the 29th iteration of the event. The first stages of the race were held on Friday, November 3, 2023, and the final stages were held on Saturday, November 4. The race was held in Avondale, Arizona at Phoenix Raceway, a 1 mile (1.6 km) permanent tri-oval shaped racetrack. The race was originally scheduled to be contested over 150 laps, but was extended to 179 laps, due to numerous NASCAR overtime restarts.

In one of the wildest and wreck-filled Truck Series races in history, Christian Eckes, driving for McAnally-Hilgemann Racing, would survive four overtime restart attempts, and held off the field to earn his fifth career NASCAR Craftsman Truck Series win, and his fourth of the season. Championship contender Corey Heim would dominate the early stages of the race, leading 47 laps until getting spun by Carson Hocevar with 30 laps to go. To fill out the podium, Jake Garcia, driving for McAnally-Hilgemann Racing, and Chase Purdy, driving for Kyle Busch Motorsports, would finish 2nd and 3rd, respectively.

Meanwhile, ThorSport Racing driver Ben Rhodes, who finished in fifth, would claim the 2023 NASCAR Craftsman Truck Series championship, finishing in just one position ahead of Grant Enfinger. He would become the fifth driver to win repeat championships in the Truck Series, also winning in 2021.

The race would be heavily criticized by the fans and drivers, specifically the final 50 laps. Fans had noted that drivers had no respect on the track, which contributed to the amount of wrecks and overtime restarts in the final laps. They would also criticize the way NASCAR had handled the event, as the race would end up finishing around 1 AM EST, one of the latest that a NASCAR race has finished. With a race time of 2 hours, 27 minutes, and 32 seconds, it is also one of the longest Truck Series races in history. Corey Heim would be deducted 25 points (drivers only) and fined $12,500 for the title deciding collision against Carson Hocevar during the race.

== Background ==
Phoenix Raceway is a one-mile, low-banked tri-oval race track located in Avondale, Arizona. It is named after the nearby metropolitan area of Phoenix. The motorsport track opened in 1964 and currently hosts two NASCAR race weekends annually. PIR has also hosted the IndyCar Series, CART, USAC and the Rolex Sports Car Series. The raceway is currently owned and operated by International Speedway Corporation.

The raceway was originally constructed with a 2.5 mi (4.0 km) road course that ran both inside and outside of the main tri-oval. In 1991 the track was reconfigured with the current 1.51 mi (2.43 km) interior layout. PIR has an estimated grandstand seating capacity of around 67,000. Lights were installed around the track in 2004 following the addition of a second annual NASCAR race weekend.

Phoenix Raceway is home to two annual NASCAR race weekends, one of 13 facilities on the NASCAR schedule to host more than one race weekend a year. The track is both the first and last stop in the western United States, as well as the fourth and the last track on the schedule.

=== Championship drivers ===
- Corey Heim advanced after winning at Bristol.
- Carson Hocevar advanced after winning at Homestead–Miami.
- Grant Enfinger advanced by virtue of points.
- Ben Rhodes advanced by virtue of points.

=== Entry list ===
- (R) denotes rookie driver.
- (CC) denotes championship contender.

#	Driver	Team	Make
1	Jesse Love	Tricon Garage	Toyota
02	Kaden Honeycutt	Young's Motorsports	Chevrolet
2	Nick Sanchez (R)	Rev Racing	Chevrolet
04	Spencer Davis	Roper Racing	Chevrolet
4	Chase Purdy	Kyle Busch Motorsports	Chevrolet
5	Dean Thompson	Tricon Garage	Toyota
7	Marco Andretti	Spire Motorsports	Chevrolet
9	Colby Howard	CR7 Motorsports	Chevrolet
11	Corey Heim (CC)	Tricon Garage	Toyota
12	Spencer Boyd	Young's Motorsports	Chevrolet
13	Hailie Deegan	ThorSport Racing	Ford
15	Tanner Gray	Tricon Garage	Toyota
16	Tyler Ankrum	Hattori Racing Enterprises	Toyota
17	Taylor Gray (R)	Tricon Garage	Toyota
19	Christian Eckes	McAnally-Hilgemann Racing	Chevrolet
20	Nick Leitz	Young's Motorsports	Chevrolet
22	Christian Rose	AM Racing	Ford
23	Grant Enfinger (CC)	GMS Racing	Chevrolet
24	Rajah Caruth (R)	GMS Racing	Chevrolet
25	Stefan Parsons	Rackley WAR	Chevrolet
30	Chris Hacker	On Point Motorsports	Toyota
33	Keith McGee	Reaume Brothers Racing	Ford
35	Jake Garcia (R)	McAnally-Hilgemann Racing	Chevrolet
38	Zane Smith	Front Row Motorsports	Ford
41	Bayley Currey	Niece Motorsports	Chevrolet
42	Carson Hocevar (CC)	Niece Motorsports	Chevrolet
43	Daniel Dye (R)	GMS Racing	Chevrolet
45	Lawless Alan	Niece Motorsports	Chevrolet
51	Jack Wood	Kyle Busch Motorsports	Chevrolet
52	Stewart Friesen	Halmar Friesen Racing	Toyota
56	Tyler Hill	Hill Motorsports	Toyota
61	Jake Drew	Hattori Racing Enterprises	Toyota
66	Conner Jones	ThorSport Racing	Ford
75	Sean Hingorani	Henderson Motorsports	Chevrolet
77	Derek Kraus	Spire Motorsports	Chevrolet
88	Matt Crafton	ThorSport Racing	Ford
98	Ty Majeski	ThorSport Racing	Ford
99	Ben Rhodes (CC)	ThorSport Racing	Ford
Official entry list

== Practice ==
The first and only practice session was held on Thursday, November 2, at 5:00 PM MST, and would last for 50 minutes. Nick Sanchez, driving for Rev Racing, would set the fastest time in the session, with a lap of 26.678, and an average speed of 134.943 mph (217.170 km/h).

Pos.	#	Driver	Team	Make	Time	Speed
1	2	Nick Sanchez (R)	Rev Racing	Chevrolet	26.678	134.943
2	11	Corey Heim (CC)	Tricon Garage	Toyota	26.757	134.544
3	98	Ty Majeski	ThorSport Racing	Ford	26.803	134.313
Full practice results

== Qualifying ==
Qualifying was held on Friday, November 3, at 3:05 PM MST. Since Phoenix Raceway is a mile oval, the qualifying system used is a single-car, one-lap system with only one round. In that round, whoever sets the fastest time will win the pole. Corey Heim, driving for Tricon Garage, would score the pole for the race, with a lap of 26.344, and an average speed of 136.654 mph (219.923 km/h).

Pos.	#	Driver	Team	Make	Time	Speed
1	11	Corey Heim (CC)	Tricon Garage	Toyota	26.344	136.654
2	98	Ty Majeski	ThorSport Racing	Ford	26.360	136.571
3	2	Nick Sanchez (R)	Rev Racing	Chevrolet	26.390	136.415
4	38	Zane Smith	Front Row Motorsports	Ford	26.432	136.199
5	4	Chase Purdy	Kyle Busch Motorsports	Chevrolet	26.484	135.931
6	99	Ben Rhodes (CC)	ThorSport Racing	Ford	26.505	135.823
7	51	Jack Wood	Kyle Busch Motorsports	Chevrolet	26.542	135.634
8	19	Christian Eckes	McAnally-Hilgemann Racing	Chevrolet	26.548	135.603
9	24	Rajah Caruth (R)	GMS Racing	Chevrolet	26.550	135.593
10	1	Jesse Love	Tricon Garage	Toyota	26.558	135.552
11	41	Bayley Currey	Niece Motorsports	Chevrolet	26.605	135.313
12	17	Taylor Gray (R)	Tricon Garage	Toyota	26.607	135.303
13	42	Carson Hocevar (CC)	Niece Motorsports	Chevrolet	26.631	135.181
14	35	Jake Garcia (R)	McAnally-Hilgemann Racing	Chevrolet	26.650	135.084
15	5	Dean Thompson	Tricon Garage	Toyota	26.728	134.690
16	77	Derek Kraus	Spire Motorsports	Chevrolet	26.762	134.519
17	23	Grant Enfinger (CC)	GMS Racing	Chevrolet	26.764	134.509
18	61	Jake Drew	Hattori Racing Enterprises	Toyota	26.787	134.394
19	16	Tyler Ankrum	Hattori Racing Enterprises	Toyota	26.790	134.378
20	52	Stewart Friesen	Halmar Friesen Racing	Toyota	26.802	134.318
21	75	Sean Hingorani	Henderson Motorsports	Chevrolet	26.807	134.293
22	43	Daniel Dye (R)	GMS Racing	Chevrolet	26.813	134.263
23	13	Hailie Deegan	ThorSport Racing	Ford	26.869	133.983
24	25	Stefan Parsons	Rackley WAR	Chevrolet	26.871	133.973
25	15	Tanner Gray	Tricon Garage	Toyota	26.897	133.844
26	9	Colby Howard	CR7 Motorsports	Chevrolet	26.900	133.829
27	02	Kaden Honeycutt	Young's Motorsports	Chevrolet	26.934	133.660
28	88	Matt Crafton	ThorSport Racing	Ford	26.938	133.640
29	66	Conner Jones	ThorSport Racing	Ford	27.057	133.052
30	30	Chris Hacker	On Point Motorsports	Toyota	27.158	132.558
31	45	Lawless Alan	Niece Motorsports	Chevrolet	27.178	132.460
Qualified by owner's points
32	22	Christian Rose	AM Racing	Ford	27.231	132.202
33	7	Marco Andretti	Spire Motorsports	Chevrolet	27.323	131.757
34	04	Spencer Davis	Roper Racing	Chevrolet	27.474	131.033
35	20	Nick Leitz	Young's Motorsports	Chevrolet	27.627	130.307
36	56	Tyler Hill	Hill Motorsports	Toyota	27.707	129.931
Failed to qualify
37	12	Spencer Boyd	Young's Motorsports	Chevrolet	27.735	129.800
38	33	Keith McGee	Reaume Brothers Racing	Ford	27.947	128.815
Official qualifying results
Official starting lineup

== Race results ==
Stage 1 Laps: 45

Pos.	#	Driver	Team	Make	Pts
1	98	Ty Majeski	ThorSport Racing	Ford	10
2	11	Corey Heim (CC)	Tricon Garage	Toyota	9
3	38	Zane Smith	Front Row Motorsports	Ford	8
4	99	Ben Rhodes (CC)	ThorSport Racing	Ford	7
5	2	Nick Sanchez (R)	Rev Racing	Chevrolet	6
6	4	Chase Purdy	Kyle Busch Motorsports	Chevrolet	5
7	19	Christian Eckes	McAnally-Hilgemann Racing	Chevrolet	4
8	42	Carson Hocevar (CC)	Niece Motorsports	Chevrolet	3
9	23	Grant Enfinger (CC)	GMS Racing	Chevrolet	2
10	17	Taylor Gray (R)	Tricon Garage	Toyota	1

Stage 2 Laps: 45

Pos.	#	Driver	Team	Make	Pts
1	11	Corey Heim (CC)	Tricon Garage	Toyota	10
2	38	Zane Smith	Front Row Motorsports	Ford	9
3	98	Ty Majeski	ThorSport Racing	Ford	8
4	19	Christian Eckes	McAnally-Hilgemann Racing	Chevrolet	7
5	17	Taylor Gray (R)	Tricon Garage	Toyota	6
6	99	Ben Rhodes (CC)	ThorSport Racing	Ford	5
7	4	Chase Purdy	Kyle Busch Motorsports	Chevrolet	4
8	23	Grant Enfinger (CC)	GMS Racing	Chevrolet	3
9	35	Jake Garcia (R)	McAnally-Hilgemann Racing	Chevrolet	2
10	42	Carson Hocevar (CC)	Niece Motorsports	Chevrolet	1

Stage 3 Laps: 89

Fin	St	#	Driver	Team	Make	Laps	Led	Status	Pts
1	8	19	Christian Eckes	McAnally-Hilgemann Racing	Chevrolet	179	36	Running	51
2	14	35	Jake Garcia (R)	McAnally-Hilgemann Racing	Chevrolet	179	0	Running	37
3	5	4	Chase Purdy	Kyle Busch Motorsports	Chevrolet	179	8	Running	43
4	10	1	Jesse Love	Tricon Garage	Toyota	179	0	Running	33
5	6	99	Ben Rhodes (CC)	ThorSport Racing	Ford	179	0	Running	32
6	17	23	Grant Enfinger (CC)	GMS Racing	Chevrolet	179	0	Running	31
7	15	5	Dean Thompson	Tricon Garage	Toyota	179	0	Running	30
8	27	02	Kaden Honeycutt	Young's Motorsports	Chevrolet	179	0	Running	29
9	25	15	Tanner Gray	Tricon Garage	Toyota	179	0	Running	28
10	3	2	Nick Sanchez (R)	Rev Racing	Chevrolet	179	5	Running	33
11	28	88	Matt Crafton	ThorSport Racing	Ford	179	0	Running	26
12	9	24	Rajah Caruth (R)	GMS Racing	Chevrolet	179	0	Running	25
13	31	45	Lawless Alan	Niece Motorsports	Chevrolet	179	0	Running	24
14	2	98	Ty Majeski	ThorSport Racing	Ford	179	48	Running	41
15	23	13	Hailie Deegan	ThorSport Racing	Ford	179	0	Running	22
16	32	22	Christian Rose	AM Racing	Ford	179	0	Running	21
17	34	04	Spencer Davis	Roper Racing	Chevrolet	179	0	Running	20
18	1	11	Corey Heim (CC)	Tricon Garage	Toyota	179	47	Running	19
19	35	20	Nick Leitz	Young's Motorsports	Chevrolet	179	0	Running	18
20	36	56	Tyler Hill	Hill Motorsports	Toyota	179	0	Running	17
21	26	9	Colby Howard	CR7 Motorsports	Chevrolet	179	0	Running	16
22	19	16	Tyler Ankrum	Hattori Racing Enterprises	Toyota	178	0	Running	15
23	12	17	Taylor Gray (R)	Tricon Garage	Toyota	177	0	Running	21
24	20	52	Stewart Friesen	Halmar Friesen Racing	Toyota	175	0	Running	13
25	4	38	Zane Smith	Front Row Motorsports	Ford	172	35	Accident	29
26	21	75	Sean Hingorani	Henderson Motorsports	Chevrolet	167	0	Accident	11
27	7	51	Jack Wood	Kyle Busch Motorsports	Chevrolet	162	0	Accident	10
28	16	77	Derek Kraus	Spire Motorsports	Chevrolet	156	0	Accident	9
29	13	42	Carson Hocevar (CC)	Niece Motorsports	Chevrolet	146	0	Accident	8
30	24	25	Stefan Parsons	Rackley WAR	Chevrolet	128	0	Accident	7
31	11	41	Bayley Currey	Niece Motorsports	Chevrolet	128	0	Accident	6
32	22	43	Daniel Dye (R)	GMS Racing	Chevrolet	128	0	Accident	5
33	18	61	Jake Drew	Hattori Racing Enterprises	Toyota	100	0	Accident	4
34	29	66	Conner Jones	ThorSport Racing	Ford	100	0	Accident	3
35	33	7	Marco Andretti	Spire Motorsports	Chevrolet	54	0	Accident	2
36	30	30	Chris Hacker	On Point Motorsports	Toyota	53	0	Accident	1
Official race results

== Standings after the race ==
Drivers' Championship standings

	Pos	Driver	Points
2	1	Ben Rhodes	4,032
2	2	Grant Enfinger	4,031 (-1)
1	3	Carson Hocevar	4,008 (-24)
3	4	Corey Heim	3,994 (-38)
	5	Christian Eckes	2,319 (-1,713)
	6	Nick Sanchez	2,258 (-1,774)
	7	Zane Smith	2,194 (-1,838)
	8	Ty Majeski	2,185 (-1,847)
	9	Matt Crafton	2,167 (-1,865)
	10	Matt DiBenedetto	2,102 (-1,930)
Official driver's standings

- Note: Only the first 10 positions are included for the driver standings.

Previous race: 2023 Baptist Health Cancer Care 200	NASCAR Craftsman Truck Series; 2023 season	Next race: 2024 Fresh From Florida 250
