= 2023 Baptist Health Cancer Care 200 =

22nd race of the 2023 NASCAR Craftsman Truck Series

Race details
- Race 22 of 23 of the 2023 NASCAR Craftsman Truck Series
- Date: October 21, 2023
- Official name: 27th Annual Baptist Health Cancer Care 200
- Location: Homestead–Miami Speedway, Homestead, Florida
- Course: Permanent racing facility
- Course length: 1.5 miles (2.4 km)
- Distance: 134 laps, 201 mi (323 km)
- Scheduled distance: 134 laps, 201 mi (323 km)
- Average speed: 110.965 mph (178.581 km/h)

Pole position
Driver	Nick Sanchez	Rev Racing
- Time: 32.319

Most laps led
Driver	Corey Heim	Tricon Garage
- Laps: 57

Winner
No. 42	Carson Hocevar	Niece Motorsports

Television in the United States
- Network: FS1
- Announcers: Jamie Little, Phil Parsons, and Michael Waltrip

Radio in the United States
- Radio: MRN

The 2023 Baptist Health Cancer Care 200 was the 22nd stock car race of the 2023 NASCAR Craftsman Truck Series, the final race of the Round of 8, and the 27th iteration of the event. The race was held on Saturday, October 21, 2023, in Homestead, Florida at Homestead–Miami Speedway, a 1.5 miles (2.4 km) permanent oval shaped racetrack. The race took the scheduled 134 laps to complete. Carson Hocevar, driving for Niece Motorsports, would make a successful late-race pass for the lead on Ben Rhodes, and led the final remaining laps to earn his fourth career NASCAR Craftsman Truck Series win, and his fourth of the season. He would earn a spot in the Championship 4. To fill out the podium, Rhodes, driving for ThorSport Racing, and Corey Heim, driving for Tricon Garage, would finish 2nd and 3rd, respectively. Zane Smith, who originally finished in the second position, was disqualified following post-race inspection due to a windshield violation.

The four drivers that would advance into the Championship 4 are Corey Heim, Carson Hocevar, Grant Enfinger, and Ben Rhodes. Nick Sanchez, Christian Eckes, Ty Majeski, and Zane Smith would be eliminated from championship contention.

== Background ==
Homestead–Miami Speedway is a motor racing track located in Homestead, Florida. The track, which has several configurations, has promoted several series of racing, including NASCAR, the NTT IndyCar Series and the Grand-Am Rolex Sports Car Series.

From 2002 to 2019, Homestead-Miami Speedway has hosted the final race of the season in all three of NASCAR's series: the NASCAR Cup Series, Xfinity Series and Craftsman Truck Series. The track has since held races on different dates in 2020 (June) and 2021 (February), which were both effected by the COVID-19 pandemic, before being moved back into the Playoffs as the final race of the Round of 8 in 2022, with the date being kept for 2023.

=== Entry list ===
- (R) denotes rookie driver.
- (i) denotes driver who is ineligible for series driver points.
- (P) denotes playoff driver.

#	Driver	Team	Make
02	Brad Perez (i)	Young's Motorsports	Chevrolet
2	Nick Sanchez (R) (P)	Rev Racing	Chevrolet
04	Spencer Davis	Roper Racing	Ford
4	Chase Purdy	Kyle Busch Motorsports	Chevrolet
5	Dean Thompson	Tricon Garage	Toyota
7	Marco Andretti	Spire Motorsports	Chevrolet
9	Colby Howard	CR7 Motorsports	Chevrolet
11	Corey Heim (P)	Tricon Garage	Toyota
12	Spencer Boyd	Young's Motorsports	Chevrolet
13	Hailie Deegan	ThorSport Racing	Ford
15	Tanner Gray	Tricon Garage	Toyota
16	Tyler Ankrum	Hattori Racing Enterprises	Toyota
17	Taylor Gray (R)	Tricon Garage	Toyota
19	Christian Eckes (P)	McAnally-Hilgemann Racing	Chevrolet
20	Nick Leitz	Young's Motorsports	Chevrolet
22	Mason Maggio	AM Racing	Ford
23	Grant Enfinger (P)	GMS Racing	Chevrolet
24	Rajah Caruth (R)	GMS Racing	Chevrolet
25	Trevor Bayne (i)	Rackley WAR	Chevrolet
30	Jonathan Shafer	On Point Motorsports	Toyota
33	Memphis Villarreal	Reaume Brothers Racing	Ford
35	Jake Garcia (R)	McAnally-Hilgemann Racing	Chevrolet
38	Zane Smith (P)	Front Row Motorsports	Ford
41	Bayley Currey	Niece Motorsports	Chevrolet
42	Carson Hocevar (P)	Niece Motorsports	Chevrolet
43	Daniel Dye (R)	GMS Racing	Chevrolet
45	Lawless Alan	Niece Motorsports	Chevrolet
46	Armani Williams	G2G Racing	Toyota
51	Jack Wood	Kyle Busch Motorsports	Chevrolet
52	Stewart Friesen	Halmar Friesen Racing	Toyota
56	Tyler Hill	Hill Motorsports	Toyota
88	Matt Crafton	ThorSport Racing	Ford
98	Ty Majeski (P)	ThorSport Racing	Ford
99	Ben Rhodes (P)	ThorSport Racing	Ford
Official entry list

== Practice ==
The first and only practice session was held on Friday, October 20, at 4:05 PM EST, and would last for 20 minutes. Zane Smith, driving for Front Row Motorsports, would set the fastest time in the session, with a lap of 32.263, and an average speed of 167.374 mph (269.362 km/h).

Pos.	#	Driver	Team	Make	Time	Speed
1	38	Zane Smith (P)	Front Row Motorsports	Ford	32.263	167.374
2	5	Dean Thompson	Tricon Garage	Toyota	32.368	166.831
3	98	Ty Majeski (P)	ThorSport Racing	Ford	32.408	166.626
Full practice results

== Qualifying ==
Qualifying was held on Friday, October 20, at 4:35 PM CST. Since Homestead–Miami Speedway is an intermediate racetrack, the qualifying system used is a single-car, one-lap system with only one round. In that round, whoever sets the fastest time will win the pole. Nick Sanchez, driving for Rev Racing, would score the pole for the race, with a lap of 32.319, and an average speed of 167.084 mph (268.896 km/h).

Pos.	#	Driver	Team	Make	Time	Speed
1	2	Nick Sanchez (R) (P)	Rev Racing	Chevrolet	32.319	167.084
2	42	Carson Hocevar (P)	Niece Motorsports	Chevrolet	32.558	165.858
3	23	Grant Enfinger (P)	GMS Racing	Chevrolet	32.651	165.385
4	98	Ty Majeski (P)	ThorSport Racing	Ford	32.671	165.284
5	5	Dean Thompson	Tricon Garage	Toyota	32.696	165.158
6	15	Tanner Gray	Tricon Garage	Toyota	32.704	165.117
7	38	Zane Smith (P)	Front Row Motorsports	Ford	32.724	165.017
8	11	Corey Heim (P)	Tricon Garage	Toyota	32.749	164.891
9	52	Stewart Friesen	Halmar Friesen Racing	Toyota	32.806	164.604
10	19	Christian Eckes (P)	McAnally-Hilgemann Racing	Chevrolet	32.890	164.184
11	51	Jack Wood	Kyle Busch Motorsports	Chevrolet	32.897	164.149
12	17	Taylor Gray (R)	Tricon Garage	Toyota	32.968	163.795
13	24	Rajah Caruth (R)	GMS Racing	Chevrolet	32.981	163.731
14	4	Chase Purdy	Kyle Busch Motorsports	Chevrolet	32.991	163.681
15	35	Jake Garcia (R)	McAnally-Hilgemann Racing	Chevrolet	33.029	163.493
16	16	Tyler Ankrum	Hattori Racing Enterprises	Toyota	33.055	163.364
17	41	Bayley Currey	Niece Motorsports	Chevrolet	33.320	162.065
18	02	Brad Perez (i)	Young's Motorsports	Chevrolet	33.326	162.036
19	43	Daniel Dye (R)	GMS Racing	Chevrolet	33.375	161.798
20	13	Hailie Deegan	ThorSport Racing	Ford	33.470	161.339
21	99	Ben Rhodes (P)	ThorSport Racing	Ford	33.482	161.281
22	88	Matt Crafton	ThorSport Racing	Ford	33.555	160.930
23	45	Lawless Alan	Niece Motorsports	Chevrolet	33.712	160.180
24	9	Colby Howard	CR7 Motorsports	Chevrolet	33.888	159.348
25	20	Nick Leitz	Young's Motorsports	Chevrolet	34.188	157.950
26	56	Tyler Hill	Hill Motorsports	Toyota	34.455	156.726
27	7	Marco Andretti	Spire Motorsports	Chevrolet	34.623	155.966
28	04	Spencer Davis	Roper Racing	Ford	34.694	155.647
29	22	Mason Maggio	AM Racing	Ford	34.959	154.467
30	12	Spencer Boyd	Young's Motorsports	Chevrolet	35.088	153.899
31	33	Memphis Villarreal	Reaume Brothers Racing	Ford	35.312	152.923
Qualified by owner's points
32	25	Trevor Bayne (i)	Rackley WAR	Chevrolet	–	–
33	30	Jonathan Shafer	On Point Motorsports	Toyota	–	–
34	46	Armani Williams	G2G Racing	Toyota	–	–
Official qualifying results
Official starting lineup

== Race results ==
Stage 1 Laps: 30

Pos.	#	Driver	Team	Make	Pts
1	11	Corey Heim (P)	Tricon Garage	Toyota	10
2	98	Ty Majeski (P)	ThorSport Racing	Ford	9
3	42	Carson Hocevar (P)	Niece Motorsports	Chevrolet	8
4	38	Zane Smith (P)	Front Row Motorsports	Ford	0
5	23	Grant Enfinger (P)	GMS Racing	Chevrolet	6
6	52	Stewart Friesen	Halmar Friesen Racing	Toyota	5
7	19	Christian Eckes (P)	McAnally-Hilgemann Racing	Chevrolet	4
8	2	Nick Sanchez (R) (P)	Rev Racing	Chevrolet	3
9	88	Matt Crafton	ThorSport Racing	Ford	2
10	4	Chase Purdy	Kyle Busch Motorsports	Chevrolet	1

Stage 2 Laps: 30

Pos.	#	Driver	Team	Make	Pts
1	11	Corey Heim (P)	Tricon Garage	Toyota	10
2	38	Zane Smith (P)	Front Row Motorsports	Ford	0
3	41	Bayley Currey	Niece Motorsports	Chevrolet	8
4	2	Nick Sanchez (R) (P)	Rev Racing	Chevrolet	7
5	52	Stewart Friesen	Halmar Friesen Racing	Toyota	6
6	98	Ty Majeski (P)	ThorSport Racing	Ford	5
7	88	Matt Crafton	ThorSport Racing	Ford	4
8	4	Chase Purdy	Kyle Busch Motorsports	Chevrolet	3
9	42	Carson Hocevar (P)	Niece Motorsports	Chevrolet	2
10	99	Ben Rhodes (P)	ThorSport Racing	Ford	1

Stage 3 Laps: 84

Fin	St	#	Driver	Team	Make	Laps	Led	Status	Pts
1	2	42	Carson Hocevar (P)	Niece Motorsports	Chevrolet	134	11	Running	51
2	21	99	Ben Rhodes (P)	ThorSport Racing	Ford	134	22	Running	37
3	8	11	Corey Heim (P)	Tricon Garage	Toyota	134	57	Running	54
4	3	23	Grant Enfinger (P)	GMS Racing	Chevrolet	134	0	Running	40
5	17	41	Bayley Currey	Niece Motorsports	Chevrolet	134	0	Running	41
6	9	52	Stewart Friesen	Halmar Friesen Racing	Toyota	134	0	Running	44
7	22	88	Matt Crafton	ThorSport Racing	Ford	134	0	Running	38
8	13	24	Rajah Caruth (R)	GMS Racing	Chevrolet	134	0	Running	30
9	4	98	Ty Majeski (P)	ThorSport Racing	Ford	134	1	Running	43
10	14	4	Chase Purdy	Kyle Busch Motorsports	Chevrolet	134	0	Running	33
11	6	15	Tanner Gray	Tricon Garage	Toyota	134	4	Running	26
12	11	51	Jack Wood	Kyle Busch Motorsports	Chevrolet	134	0	Running	25
13	12	17	Taylor Gray (R)	Tricon Garage	Toyota	134	0	Running	24
14	32	25	Trevor Bayne (i)	Rackley WAR	Chevrolet	134	0	Running	0
15	15	35	Jake Garcia (R)	McAnally-Hilgemann Racing	Chevrolet	133	0	Running	22
16	5	5	Dean Thompson	Tricon Garage	Toyota	133	0	Running	21
17	1	2	Nick Sanchez (R) (P)	Rev Racing	Chevrolet	133	5	Running	32
18	27	7	Marco Andretti	Spire Motorsports	Chevrolet	133	0	Running	19
19	23	45	Lawless Alan	Niece Motorsports	Chevrolet	133	0	Running	18
20	10	19	Christian Eckes (P)	McAnally-Hilgemann Racing	Chevrolet	133	0	Running	22
21	19	43	Daniel Dye (R)	GMS Racing	Chevrolet	133	0	Running	16
22	26	56	Tyler Hill	Hill Motorsports	Chevrolet	133	0	Running	15
23	25	20	Nick Leitz	Young's Motorsports	Chevrolet	133	0	Running	14
24	18	02	Brad Perez (i)	Young's Motorsports	Chevrolet	133	0	Running	0
25	16	16	Tyler Ankrum	Hattori Racing Enterprises	Toyota	133	0	Running	13
26	33	30	Jonathan Shafer	On Point Motorsports	Toyota	132	0	Running	11
27	29	22	Mason Maggio	AM Racing	Ford	131	0	Running	10
28	20	13	Hailie Deegan	ThorSport Racing	Ford	131	0	Running	9
29	31	33	Memphis Villarreal	Reaume Brothers Racing	Ford	131	0	Running	8
30	24	9	Colby Howard	CR7 Motorsports	Chevrolet	129	0	Running	7
31	34	46	Armani Williams	G2G Racing	Toyota	121	0	Running	6
32	28	04	Spencer Davis	Roper Racing	Ford	65	0	Electrical	5
33	30	12	Spencer Boyd	Young's Motorsports	Chevrolet	50	0	Electrical	4
DSQ	7	38	Zane Smith (P) (Note: Smith originally finished second, but was later disqualified as the windshield support of his truck was found to have violated required specifications in post-race inspection.)	Front Row Motorsports	Ford	134	34	Disqualified	3
Official race results

== Standings after the race ==
Drivers' Championship standings

	Pos	Driver	Points
	1	Corey Heim	4,000
	2	Carson Hocevar	4,000 (-0)
3	3	Ben Rhodes	4,000 (-0)
1	4	Grant Enfinger	4,000 (-0)
2	5	Christian Eckes	2,268 (-1,732)
2	6	Nick Sanchez	2,225 (-1,775)
1	7	Zane Smith	2,165 (-1,835)
1	8	Ty Majeski	2,154 (-1,846)
	9	Matt Crafton	2,141 (-1,859)
	10	Matt DiBenedetto	2,102 (-1,898)
Official driver's standings

- Note: Only the first 10 positions are included for the driver standings.

Previous race: 2023 Love's RV Stop 250	NASCAR Craftsman Truck Series; 2023 season	Next race: 2023 Craftsman 150
