= CR7 Motorsports =

NASCAR team

- Owner(s): Codie Rohrbaugh; Thomas Rohrbaugh; Larry Berg
- Series: NASCAR Craftsman Truck Series; ARCA Menards Series; ARCA Menards Series East; ARCA Menards Series West
- Race drivers: Truck Series: 9. Grant Enfinger; ARCA Menards Series: 97. Jason Kitzmiller; ARCA Menards Series East: 9. Landon S. Huffman (part-time); 97. Jason Kitzmiller (part-time); ARCA Menards Series West: 97. Jason Kitzmiller (part-time)
- Manufacturer: Chevrolet
- Opened: 2014 (East Series); 2016 (ARCA); 2018 (Truck)

Career
- Debut: Truck Series: 2018 UNOH 200 (Bristol); ARCA Menards Series: 2016 Crosley 150 (Kentucky); ARCA Menards Series East: 2014 Pensacola 150 (Five Flags); ARCA Menards Series West: 2023 Desert Diamond Casino West Valley 100 (Phoenix)
- Races competed: Total: 283; Craftsman Truck Series: 165; ARCA Menards Series: 90; ARCA Menards Series East: 25; ARCA Menards Series West: 3
- Drivers' Championships: Total: 0 Craftsman Truck Series: 0 ARCA Menards Series: 0 ARCA Menards Series East: 0 ARCA Menards Series West: 0
- Race victories: Total: 3 Craftsman Truck Series: 3 ARCA Menards Series: 0 ARCA Menards Series East: 0 ARCA Menards Series West: 0
- Pole positions: Total: 0 Craftsman Truck Series: 0 ARCA Menards Series: 0 ARCA Menards Series East: 0 ARCA Menards Series West: 0

CR7 Motorsports (also sometimes known as Grant County Mulch Racing) is an American professional stock car racing team that currently competes in the NASCAR Craftsman Truck Series, fielding the No. 9 Chevrolet Silverado full-time for Grant Enfinger. CR7 also operates in the ARCA Menards Series with the No. 97 Chevrolet SS full-time for Jason Kitzmiller.

== History ==
The team has a technical alliance with McAnally–Hilgemann Racing.

The team has no relation to the soccer player Cristiano Ronaldo who's also known as CR7.

== NASCAR Craftsman Truck Series ==
=== Truck No. 9 history ===
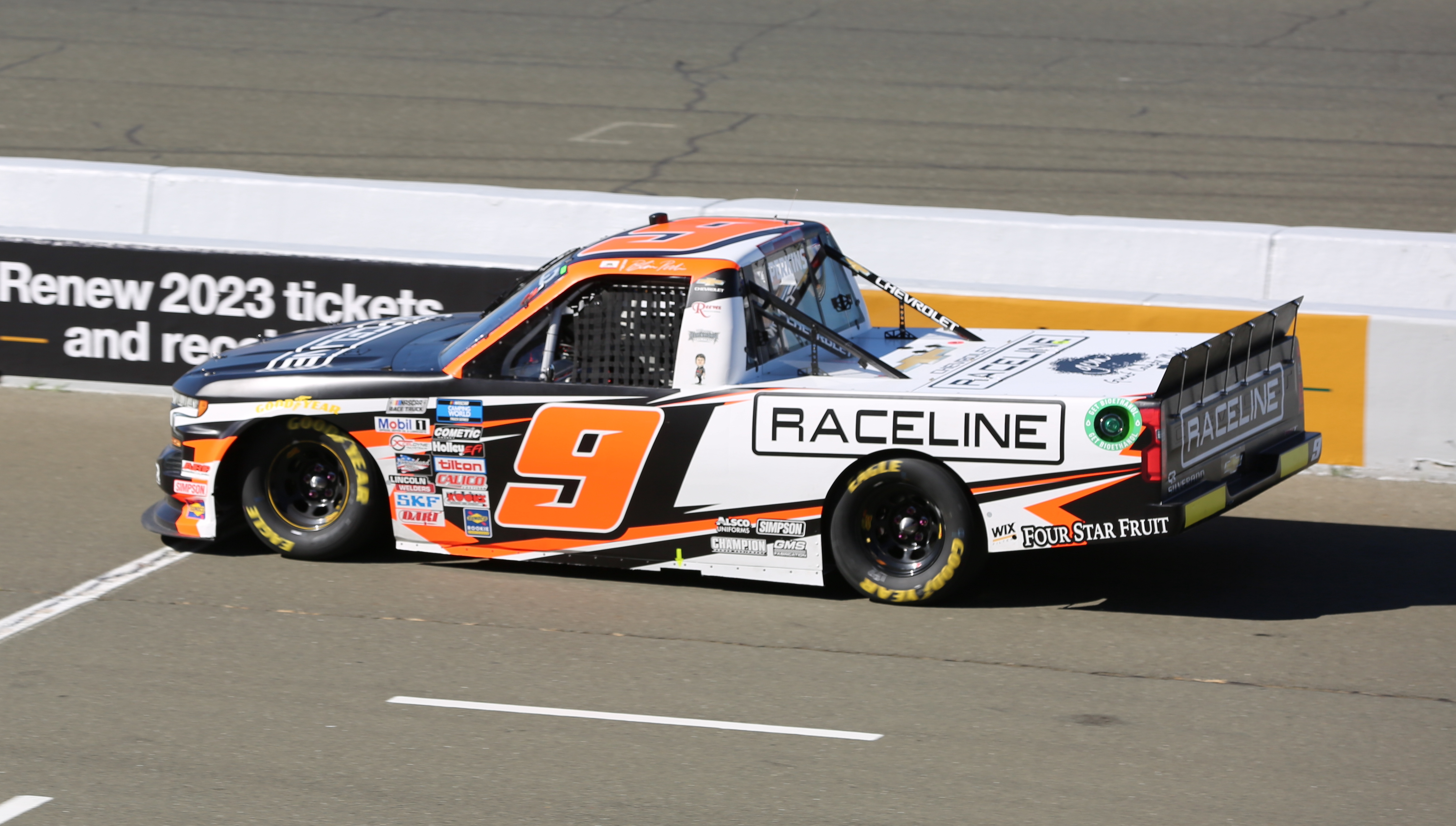
Blaine Perkins in the No. 9 at Sonoma Raceway in 2022

Rohrbaugh did qualify for the race in his and the team's first Truck Series attempt, at Bristol in 2018. As Korbin Forrister's team was already using the No. 7, they picked the No. 9 to use for their Truck Series team. They finished with a top-twenty in their first race (sixteenth) in No. 9 Chevrolet Silverado. Returning for the race at Texas in November, now driving a Ford truck, Rohrbaugh was able to make the race again, and he impressively picked up another top-twenty, finishing seventeenth. The team did announce they would be attempting Homestead, but they changed their mind to focus on preparing for the ARCA season-opener at Daytona in 2019.

Returning in 2019, CR7 attempted twelve races, about half of the season, and all with Rohrbaugh as the driver. The team used Silverados in all races they attempted. Rohrbaugh qualified for nine of twelve races. His DNQs came at Daytona, Martinsville in March, and Bristol. He crashed in each of the first three races he did qualify for, which were at both Texas races (in March and June) and Charlotte. His other DNF that year came when he was involved in the big one at Talladega. Despite not qualifying for some of his races and not finishing in others, he scored a top-ten finish in the second Martinsville race in October. Also in 2019, the team worked with three different crew chiefs. They started the year with Michael Shelton before he left to crew chief the No. 46 Kyle Busch Motorsports team. Their general manager and ARCA team crew chief Mark Huff worked with the truck team for the first Martinsville race. They then picked up Doug George, who came over after starting the season with the Niece Motorsports No. 44 team. Rohrbaugh returned and ran seventeen races in 2020. The season started with him finishing third in the NextEra Energy 250. Other than that, Rohrbaugh posted five top-twenty finishes, including a fifth place finish at Talladega Superspeedway and a sixth place finish at Richmond Raceway.

In 2021, Rohrbaugh got another top-ten in the season opener NextEra Energy 250, finishing eighth. Grant Enfinger drove the No. 9 at Las Vegas Motor Speedway, finishing seventh. At the end of the year, Colby Howard would make three starts for the team.

In 2022, Blaine Perkins would drive the No. 9 truck full-time. Perkins scored only one top-twenty finish that season, an eighteenth place finish at Nashville. Perkins ended the season 32nd in the standings and left the team at the conclusion of the season.

In 2023, Colby Howard would drive the entry full-time. He finished 24th in the final standings.

In 2024, Grant Enfinger would return to drive the No. 9 full-time in a multi-year deal. Enfinger started the 2024 season with a seventeenth place finish at Daytona. Despite not scoring a win during the regular season, he stayed consistent with five top-fives and eight top-ten finishes to make the playoffs. Enfinger gave CR7 its first win at Talladega and made the Championship 4. He followed it up with another win at Homestead.

In 2025, Enfinger started the season with a 4th place finish at Daytona. Despite not scoring any win, he ended the season with seven top-fives and fourteen top-ten finishes.

In 2026 Enfinger started season with a 29th place finish at Daytona. At Lime Rock, he won his first win of the season, snapping a 40 race winless streak.

==== Truck No. 9 results ====
Year	Driver	No.	Make	1	2	3	4	5	6	7	8	9	10	11	12	13	14	15	16	17	18	19	20	21	22	23	24	25	Owners	Pts
2018	Codie Rohrbaugh	9	Chevy	DAY	ATL	LVS	MAR	DOV	KAN	CLT	TEX	IOW	GTW	CHI	KEN	ELD	POC	MCH	BRI; 16	MSP	LVS	TAL	MAR						47th	41
2018	Codie Rohrbaugh	9	Ford																					TEX; 17	PHO	HOM			47th	41
2019	Codie Rohrbaugh	9	Chevy	DAY; DNQ	ATL	LVS	MAR; DNQ	TEX; 23	DOV	KAN	CLT; 29	TEX; 30	IOW	GTW	CHI	KEN; 14	POC	ELD	MCH; 17	BRI; DNQ	MSP	LVS; 16	TAL; 24	MAR; 10	PHO	HOM; 26			32nd	144
2020	Codie Rohrbaugh	9	Chevy	DAY; 3	LVS; 18	CLT; 18	ATL; 33	HOM; 28	POC; 39	KEN; 39	TEX; 22	KAN; 24	KAN; 29	MCH; 18	DAY; 29	DOV	GTW	DAR; 25	RCH; 6	BRI; 31	LVS	TAL; 5	KAN	TEX	MAR; 34	PHO			31st	225
2021	Codie Rohrbaugh	9	Chevy	DAY; 8	DAY; 16		ATL; 29	BRI; 27	RCH; 36		DAR; 38			TEX	NSH		KNX; 34						TAL; 16						24th	326
2021	Grant Enfinger	9	Chevy			LVS; 7				KAN; 17		COA; 4	CLT; 14			POC; 36		GLN; 38	GTW; 25			LVS; 7			PHO; 13				24th	326
2021	Colby Howard	9	Chevy																	DAR; 13	BRI; 15			MAR; 38					24th	326
2022	Blaine Perkins	9	Chevy	DAY; 31	LVS; 35	ATL; 29	COA; 35	MAR; DNQ	BRI; 25	DAR; 31	KAN; 32	TEX; 26	CLT; 30	GTW; 22	SON; 21	KNX; 25	NSH; 18	MOH; 30	POC; 29	IRP; 26	RCH; 34	KAN; 30	BRI; 28	TAL; 27	HOM; 22	PHO; 25			32nd	203
2023	Colby Howard	9	Chevy	DAY; 4	LVS; 18	ATL; 27	COA; 24	TEX; 20	BRD; 27	MAR; 17	KAN; 35	DAR; 17	NWS; 24	CLT; 20	GTW; 12	NSH; 29	MOH; 36	POC; 15	RCH; 24	IRP; 35	MLW; 17	KAN; 19	BRI; 22	TAL; 23	HOM; 30	PHO; 21			24th	340
2024	Grant Enfinger	9	Chevy	DAY; 17	ATL; 25	LVS; 9	BRI; 9	COA; 12	MAR; 22	TEX; 29	KAN; 12	DAR; 16	NWS; 2	CLT; 3	GTW; 17	NSH; 6	POC; 2	IRP; 3	RCH; 4*	MLW; 13	BRI; 17	KAN; 9	TAL; 1*	HOM; 1	MAR; 9	PHO; 5			4th	4032
2025	Grant Enfinger	9	Chevy	DAY; 4	ATL; 10	LVS; 2	HOM; 9	MAR; 27	BRI; 12	ROC; 5	TEX; 23	KAN; 9	NWS; 5	CLT; 6	NSH; 10	MCH; 2	POC; 17	LRP; 11	IRP; 4	GLN; 24	RCH; 13	DAR; 3	BRI; 21	NHA; 6	ROV; 7	TAL; 36	MAR; 12	PHO; 24	8th	2197
2026	Grant Enfinger	9	Chevy	DAY; 29	ATL; 22	STP; 22	DAR; 7	ROC; 5	BRI; 27	TEX; 32	GLN; 33	DOV; 15	CLT; 16	NSH; 7	MCH; 11	COR; 29	LRP; 1	NWS; 25	IRP; 14	RCH; 5	NHA; 13	BRI; 10	KAN; 31	CLT; 12	PHO; 9	TAL; 24	MAR; 11	HOM; 9	13th	631

=== Truck No. 97 history ===
In 2022, the team announced that Jason Kitzmiller would make his truck series start in the 2022 NextEra Energy 250, driving the No. 97, which is his main ARCA number, for a second entry. However, he withdrew from the event after crashing his primary truck in practice and not having a backup truck.

In 2023, Codie Rohrbaugh drove the No. 97 truck at Daytona. He finished 33rd.

Rohrbaugh would race in the next year's Daytona race, this time finishing 23rd.

In 2025, Carson Kvapil would drive the No. 97 at Richmond.

In 2026, Kitzmiller drove the No. 97 truck at Daytona. He finished 30th.

==== Truck No. 97 results ====
Year	Driver	No.	Make	1	2	3	4	5	6	7	8	9	10	11	12	13	14	15	16	17	18	19	20	21	22	23	24	25	Owners	Pts
2022	Jason Kitzmiller	97	Chevy	DAY; Wth	LVS	ATL	COA	MAR	BRD	DAR	KAN	TEX	CLT	GTW	SON	KNO	NSH	MOH	POC	IRP	RCH	KAN	BRI	TAL	HOM	PHO			57th	0
2023	Codie Rohrbaugh	97	Chevy	DAY; 33	LVS	ATL	COA	TEX	BRD	MAR	KAN	DAR	NWS	CLT	GTW	NSH	MOH	POC	RCH	IRP	MLW	KAN	BRI	TAL	HOM	PHO			47th	4
2024	Codie Rohrbaugh	97	Chevy	DAY; 23	ATL	LVS	BRI	COA	MAR	TEX	KAN	DAR	NWS	CLT	GTW	NSH	POC	IRP	RCH	MLW	BRI	KAN	TAL	HOM	MAR	PHO			45th	14
2025	Carson Kvapil	97	Chevy	DAY	ATL	LVS	HOM	MAR	BRI	ROC	TEX	KAN	NWS	CLT	NSH	MCH	POC	LRP	IRP	GLN	RCH; 15	DAR	BRI	NHA; Wth	ROV	TAL	MAR	PHO	44th	22
2026	Jason Kitzmiller	97	Chevy	DAY; 30	ATL	STP	DAR	ROC	BRI	TEX	GLN	DOV	CLT	NSH	MCH	COR	LRP	NWS	IRP	RCH	NHA	BRI	KAN	CLT	PHO	TAL	MAR	HOM	45th	7

== ARCA Menards Series ==
=== Car No. 7 history ===
In addition to their K&N East races in 2016, Rohrbaugh's team made their ARCA debut that year, running the last two races of the year at Kentucky and Kansas. The same as how he did in his first East Series start, Rohrbaugh finished thirteenth in his ARCA Series debut. However, Rohrbaugh did not finish the race at Kansas due to electrical issues and ended up 32nd.

For 2017, Rohrbaugh and his No. 7 team attempted an expanded schedule of eight races in ARCA after dropping their K&N program. The team ran Chevrolets in all races, except for Daytona and Talladega that they ran Dodges. Rohrbaugh finished every race no worse than 16th except for when he crashed out at Chicago, finishing 29th. His best finishes were a pair of eighth-place runs at Michigan and Kansas.

The team started out the 2018 season now driving a Chevrolet SS but crashed at Daytona and rebuilt the same car in time to attempt Talladega.

At the ARCA Daytona test in January 2019, Rohrbaugh announced he would compete in all the speedway races that year. However, Rohrbaugh eventually decided to focus on the Truck Series team, and they cut back their ARCA schedule for the rest of the 2019 season. Eric Caudell bought the team's owner points and switched his team's car number from the No. 2 to the No. 7, which Rohrbaugh's team had been running.

==== Car No. 7 results ====
Year	Driver	No.	Make	1	2	3	4	5	6	7	8	9	10	11	12	13	14	15	16	17	18	19	20	Owners	Pts
2016	Codie Rohrbaugh	7	Chevy	DAY	NSH	SLM	TAL	TOL	NJE	POC	MCH	MAD	WIN	IOW	IRP	POC	BLN	ISF	DSF	SLM	CHI	KEN; 13	KAN; 32		
2017	Codie Rohrbaugh	7	Dodge	DAY; 14	NSH	SLM	TAL; 14	TOL	ELK																
2017	Codie Rohrbaugh	7	Chevy							POC; 12	MCH; 8	MAD	IOW	IRP	POC; 11	WIN	ISF	ROA	DSF	SLM	CHI; 29	KEN; 16	KAN; 8		
2018	Codie Rohrbaugh	7	Chevy	DAY; 38	NSH	SLM	TAL; 24	TOL	CLT; 9	POC; 17	MCH; 10	MAD	GTW	CHI; 8	IOW	ELK	POC; 7	ISF	BLN	DSF	SLM	IRP	KAN; 12		
2019	Codie Rohrbaugh	7	Chevy	DAY; 7	FIF	SLM	TAL	NSH	TOL	CLT; 16	POC	MCH	MAD	GTW	CHI	ELK	IOW	POC	ISF	DSF	SLM	IRP	KAN		

=== Car No. 9 history ===
In 2026, Landon S. Huffman would drive the No. 9 at Chicagoland and Kansas.

==== Car No. 9 results ====
Year	Driver	No.	Make	1	2	3	4	5	6	7	8	9	10	11	12	13	14	15	16	17	18	19	20	Owners	Pts
2026	Landon S. Huffman	9	Chevy	DAY	PHO	KAN	TAL	GLN	TOL	MCH	POC	BER	ELK	CHI; 3	LRP	IRP	IOW	ISF	MAD	DSF	SLM	BRI	KAN; 20	19th	490

=== Car No. 97 history ===
For 2020, the team returned to ARCA, entering a car in the series' testing at Daytona in January with newcomer Jason Kitzmiller driving the No. 97 (since Caudell was continuing to use the No. 7). The team then filed an entry for the race there in February. The team would attempt six more races throughout the year after Daytona.

From 2021 until 2024, Kitzmiller would drive the No. 97 car part-time.

On January 27, 2025, it was announced that Kitzmiller would run full-time in the No. 97 car. He started the season with a 3rd-place finish at Daytona. At Charlotte, Kitzmiller would move to the No. 79 while Grant Enfinger would drive the No. 97 to a 2nd-place finish. Kitzmiller ended the season with 14 top tens and 2 top fives.

Kitzmiller started his 2026 season with a 7th-place finish at Daytona. At Salem, Landon S. Huffman would drive the No. 97 car.

==== Car No. 97 results ====
Year	Driver	No.	Make	1	2	3	4	5	6	7	8	9	10	11	12	13	14	15	16	17	18	19	20	Owners	Pts
2020	Jason Kitzmiller	97	Chevy	DAY; 32	PHO	TAL; 8	POC; 14	IRP	KEN; 10	IOW	KAN; 11	TOL	TOL	MCH; 8	DAY	GTW	L44	TOL	BRI; 13	WIN	MEM	ISF	KAN	18th	212
2021	Jason Kitzmiller	97	Chevy	DAY; 11	PHO	TAL; 15	KAN	TOL	CLT; 11	MOH	POC; 17	ELK	BLN	IOW	WIN	GLN	MCH; 12	ISF	MLW	DSF	BRI; 22	SLM	KAN	24th	177
2022	Jason Kitzmiller	97	Chevy	DAY; 34	PHO	TAL; 14	KAN	CLT	IOW	BLN	ELK	MOH	POC; 9	IRP	MCH; 12	GLN	ISF	MLW	DSF	KAN	BRI	SLM	TOL	28th	107
2023	Jason Kitzmiller	97	Chevy	DAY; 19	PHO	TAL; 26	KAN; 23						POC; 11	MCH; 13	IRP	GLN	ISF							22nd	233
2023	Grant Enfinger	97	Chevy					CLT; 4	BLN	ELK	MOH	IOW						MLW; 5	DSF	KAN				22nd	233
2023	Landen Lewis	97	Chevy																		BRI; 20	SLM	TOL	22nd	233
2024	Jason Kitzmiller	97	Chevy	DAY; 6	PHO	TAL; 33	DOV	KAN	CLT; 9	IOW	MOH	BLN	IRP	SLM	ELK	MCH; 7	ISF	MLW	DSF	GLN		KAN; 10	TOL	24th	198
2024	Landen Lewis	97	Chevy																		BRI; 2			24th	198
2025	Jason Kitzmiller	97	Chevy	DAY; 3	PHO; 27	TAL; 5	KAN; 7		MCH; 8	BER; 8	ELK; 6	LRP; 19	DOV; 8	IRP; 8	IOW; 10	GLN; 17	ISF; 10	MAD; 7	DSF; 14	BRI; 9	SLM; 11	KAN; 9	TOL; 9	7th	885
2025	Grant Enfinger	97	Chevy					CLT; 2																7th	885
2026	Jason Kitzmiller	97	Chevy	DAY; 7	PHO; 16	KAN; 6	TAL; 33	GLN; 23	TOL; 7	MCH; 23	POC; 9	BER; 10	ELK; 5	CHI; 9	LRP; 17	IRP; 16	IOW; 25	ISF; 10	MAD; 9	DSF; 7		BRI; 11	KAN; 7	7th	826
2026	Landon S. Huffman	97	Chevy																		SLM; 4			7th	826

== ARCA Menards Series East ==
=== Car No. 05 history ===
Rohrbaugh's family team made their first NASCAR starts in 2014 in what was then the K&N Pro Series East while also competing full-time in the X-1R Pro Cup Series that year. With his grandfather Larry Berg as the listed owner, the team fielded the No. 05 Toyota in three races: Five Flags, New Hampshire, and Dover. Their best finish was in their debut at Five Flags, where Rohrbaugh finished thirteenth.

==== Car No. 05 results ====
Year	Driver	No.	Make	1	2	3	4	5	6	7	8	9	10	11	12	13	14	15	16	Owners	Pts
2014	Codie Rohrbaugh	05	Toyota	NSM	DAY	BRI	GRE	RCH	IOW	BGS	FIF; 13	LGY	NHA; 23	COL	IOW	GLN	VIR	GRE	DOV; 29		

=== Car No. 7 history ===
They returned for another part-time schedule in 2015, switching numbers from the No. 05 to the No. 7 and manufacturers from Toyota to Chevrolet. The team ran New Hampshire and Dover again, and also for the first time attempted New Smyrna, Bristol, and Richmond. The other race they entered that year was the East Series’ first and to-date only race at Motordrome Speedway, where Rohrbaugh and his team earned their first top-ten with a ninth place finish.

The team attempted five East Series races the following year. They attempted mostly the same schedule, but with Motordrome and Richmond off the schedule for 2016, they attempted the new race at Mobile instead. Rohrbaugh crashed out in two of his five starts and finished in the top-twenty (two nineteenths and a thirteenth) in his remaining races.

==== Car No. 7 results ====
Year	Driver	No.	Make	1	2	3	4	5	6	7	8	9	10	11	12	13	14	Owners	Pts
2015	Codie Rohrbaugh	7	Chevy	NSM; 13	GRE	BRI; 22	IOW	BGS	LGY	COL	NHA; 19	IOW	GLN	MOT; 9	VIR	RCH; 13	DOV; 17		
2016	Codie Rohrbaugh	7	Chevy	NSM; 19	MOB; 19	GRE	BRI; 26	VIR	DOM	STA	COL	NHA; 13	IOW	GLN	GRE	NJM	DOV; 22		

=== Car No. 9 history ===
In 2026, Landon S. Huffman would drive the No. 9 at Hickory and Nashville Fairgrounds.

==== Car No. 9 results ====
Year	Driver	No.	Make	1	2	3	4	5	6	7	8	Owners	Pts
2026	Landon S. Huffman	9	Chevy	HCY; 6	CAR	NSV; 2	TOL	IRP	FRS	IOW	BRI	32nd	81

=== Car No. 97 history ===
The team returned to the East Series in 2020. They fielded the No. 97 car in a combination event with the ARCA Menards Series at the Bush's beans 200 with Jason Kitzmiller as the driver. He finished thirteenth.

Kitzmiller would race in the next year's Bristol race, this time finishing 22nd.

In 2023, Grant Enfinger drove the No. 97 at Milwaukee Mile to a 5th place finish. Landen Lewis drove the No. 97 at Bristol.

In 2024, Lewis drove the No. 97 at Bristol to a runner-up finish.

In 2025, Kitzmiller would drive the No. 97 at four combined ARCA Menards Series events.

In 2026, Kitzmiller would return to drive the No. 97 at four combined ARCA Menards Series events.

==== Car No. 97 results ====
Year	Driver	No.	Make	1	2	3	4	5	6	7	8	Owners	Pts
2020	Jason Kitzmiller	97	Chevy	NSM	TOL	DOV; DNS	TOL	BRI; 13	FIF				
2021	Jason Kitzmiller	97	Chevy	NSM	FIF	NSV	DOV	SNM	IOW	MLW	BRI; 22		
2023	Grant Enfinger	97	Chevy	FIF	DOV	NSV	FRS	IOW	IRP	MLW; 5			
2023	Landen Lewis	97	Chevy								BRI; 20		
2024	Landen Lewis	97	Chevy	FIF	DOV	NSV	FRS	IOW	IRP	MLW	BRI; 2		
2025	Jason Kitzmiller	97	Chevy	FIF	CAR	NSH	FRS	DOV; 8	IRP; 8	IOW; 10	BRI; 9	19th	191
2026	Jason Kitzmiller	97	Chevy	HCY	CAR	NSV	TOL; 7	IRP; 16	FRS	IOW; 25	BRI; 11	24th	117

== ARCA Menards Series West ==
=== Car No. 97 history ===
The team made their ARCA West debut in 2023, fielding the No. 97 car for Landen Lewis at Phoenix. He finished sixth.

In 2025, Jason Kitzmiller drove the No. 97 at ARCA Menards Series West combined event at Phoenix. He finished 27th.

Kitzmiller would race in the next year's Phoenix race, this time finishing 16th.

==== Car No. 97 results ====
Year	Driver	No.	Make	1	2	3	4	5	6	7	8	9	10	11	12	13	Owners	Pts
2023	Landen Lewis	97	Chevy	PHO	IRW	KCR	PIR	SON	IRW	SHA	EVG	AAS	LVS	MAD	PHO; 6		40th	38
2025	Jason Kitzmiller	97	Chevy	KER	PHO; 27	TUC	CNS	KER	SON	TRI	PIR	AAS	MAD	LVS	PHO		45th	17
2026	Jason Kitzmiller	97	Chevy	KER	PHO; 16	TUC	SHA	CNS	TRI	SON	PIR	AAS	MAD	LVS	PHO	KER	-*	-*

== ACR Motorsports ==
ACR Motorsports
- Owner: Jason Kitzmiller
- Series: ARCA Menards Series; ARCA Menards Series East; ARCA Menards Series West
- Race drivers: ARCA Menards Series: 79. Isaac Kitzmiller, TBA
- Manufacturer: Chevrolet
- Opened: 2025

Career
- Debut: ARCA Menards Series: 2025 General Tire 150 (Charlotte); ARCA Menards Series East: 2025 Pensacola 150 (Pensacola); ARCA Menards Series West: 2026 General Tire 150 (Phoenix)
- Latest race: ARCA Menards Series: 2026 Bush's Best 200 (Bristol); ARCA Menards Series East: 2026 Bush's Best 200 (Bristol); ARCA Menards Series West: 2026 General Tire 150 (Phoenix)
- Races competed: Total: 34; ARCA Menards Series: 17; ARCA Menards Series East: 16; ARCA Menards Series West: 1
- Drivers' Championships: Total: 1 ARCA Menards Series: 0 ARCA Menards Series East: 1 ARCA Menards Series West: 0
- Race victories: Total: 0 ARCA Menards Series: 0 ARCA Menards Series East: 0 ARCA Menards Series West: 0
- Pole positions: Total: 0 ARCA Menards Series: 0 ARCA Menards Series East: 0 ARCA Menards Series West: 0

ACR Motorsports (short for A.L.L. Construction Racing Motorsports) is an American stock car racing team that competes in the ARCA Menards Series and the ARCA Menards Series East. The team was founded in 2025 and currently fields the No. 79 Chevrolet SS full-time in the ARCA Menards Series for Isaac Kitzmiller.

=== Car No. 79 history ===
In 2025, Jason Kitzmiller would drive the No. 79 car at Charlotte while Grant Enfinger drove the No. 97 car. Isaac Kitzmiller would drive the No. 79 car at combined ARCA East race at Dover, IRP, Iowa, and Bristol.

In 2026, Isaac Kitzmiller would return to drive the No. 79 car for multiple races starting at the West Series race combined events at Phoenix. At Salem, Matt Kemp would drive the No. 79 car.

==== Car No. 79 results ====
Year	Driver	No.	Make	1	2	3	4	5	6	7	8	9	10	11	12	13	14	15	16	17	18	19	20	Owners	Pts
2025	Jason Kitzmiller	79	Chevy	DAY	PHO	TAL	KAN	CLT; 32	MCH	BER	ELK	LRP												27th	163
2025	Isaac Kitzmiller	79	Chevy										DOV; 4	IRP; 7	IOW; 6	GLN	ISF	MAD	DSF	BRI; 8	SLM	KAN	TOL	27th	163
2026	Isaac Kitzmiller	79	Chevy	DAY	PHO; 7	KAN	TAL	GLN; 30	TOL; 13	MCH	POC; 11	BLN	ELK	CHI	LRP; 8	IRP; 5	IOW; 5	ISF; 2	MAD; 6	DSF; 8		BRI; 5	KAN	55th	41
2026	Matt Kemp	79	Chevy																		SLM; 23			55th	41

=== Car No. 79 history ===
On March 6, 2025, it was announced that Isaac Kitzmiller would drive the No. 79 for the race at Pensacola. Several days after that, it was announced that Kitzmiller will run the full East Series schedule with the team in the No. 79. He would go on to win the championship over Tyler Reif, scoring top-tens in all eight races in the East Series schedule.

In 2026, Kitzmiller returned to drive the No. 79 car full-time. He ended the season with seven top-fives and 3rd in the standings.

==== Car No. 79 results ====
Year	Driver	No.	Make	1	2	3	4	5	6	7	8	Owners	Pts
2025	Isaac Kitzmiller	79	Chevy	FIF; 5	CAR; 6	NSH; 4	FRS; 7	DOV; 4	IRP; 7	IOW; 6	BRI; 8	2nd	355
2026	Isaac Kitzmiller	79	Chevy	HCY; 3	ROC; 3	NSV; 5	TOL; 13	IRP; 5	FRS; 3	IOW; 5	BRI; 5	4th	411

=== Car No. 79 history ===
In 2026, Isaac Kitzmiller would drive the No. 79 car at Phoenix.

==== Car No. 79 results ====
Year	Driver	No.	Make	1	2	3	4	5	6	7	8	9	10	11	12	13	Owners	Pts
2026	Isaac Kitzmiller	79	Chevy	KER	PHO; 7	TUC	SHA	CNS	TRI	SON	PIR	AAS	MAD	LVS	PHO	KER	-*	-*
