= 2024 Bush's Beans 200 =

18th race of the 2024 ARCA Menards Series

Race details
- Race 18 of 20 of the 2024 ARCA Menards Series; Race 8 of 8 of the 2024 ARCA Menards Series East
- Date: September 19, 2024
- Official name: 5th Annual Bush's Beans 200
- Location: Bristol Motor Speedway in Bristol, Tennessee
- Course: Permanent racing facility
- Course length: 0.553 miles (0.858 km)
- Distance: 205 laps, 108 mi (173 km)
- Scheduled distance: 200 laps, 106 mi (171 km)

Pole position
Driver	Connor Zilisch	Pinnacle Racing Group
- Time: 15.503

Most laps led
Driver	William Sawalich	Joe Gibbs Racing
- Laps: 102

Winner
No. 18	William Sawalich	Joe Gibbs Racing

Television in the United States
- Network: FS1
- Announcers: Jamie Little, Phil Parsons, and Trevor Bayne

Radio in the United States
- Radio: MRN

The 2024 Bush's Beans 200 was the 18th stock car race of the 2024 ARCA Menards Series season, the 8th and final race of the 2024 ARCA Menards Series East season, and the 5th iteration of the event. The race was held on Thursday, September 19, 2024, at Bristol Motor Speedway in Bristol, Tennessee, a 0.553 mile (0.858 km) permanent oval shaped racetrack. The race took the scheduled 200 laps to complete. In a caution-filled race, William Sawalich, driving for Joe Gibbs Racing, would hold off a hard charging battle between Landen Lewis throughout the entire race, and took over the lead on the final restart with two to go, earning his 12th career ARCA Menards Series win, his 7th career ARCA Menards Series East win, and his 9th win of the season. To fill out the podium, Lewis, driving for CR7 Motorsports, and Lavar Scott, driving for Rev Racing, would finish 2nd and 3rd, respectively.

In addition to winning, Sawalich would claim the 2024 ARCA Menards Series East championship, 12 points ahead of Connor Zilisch, who was involved in an early race incident, ending his contention of winning. This was Sawalich's second championship after winning it the year before, and the fourth consecutive championship for the 18 car.

== Report ==
=== Background ===
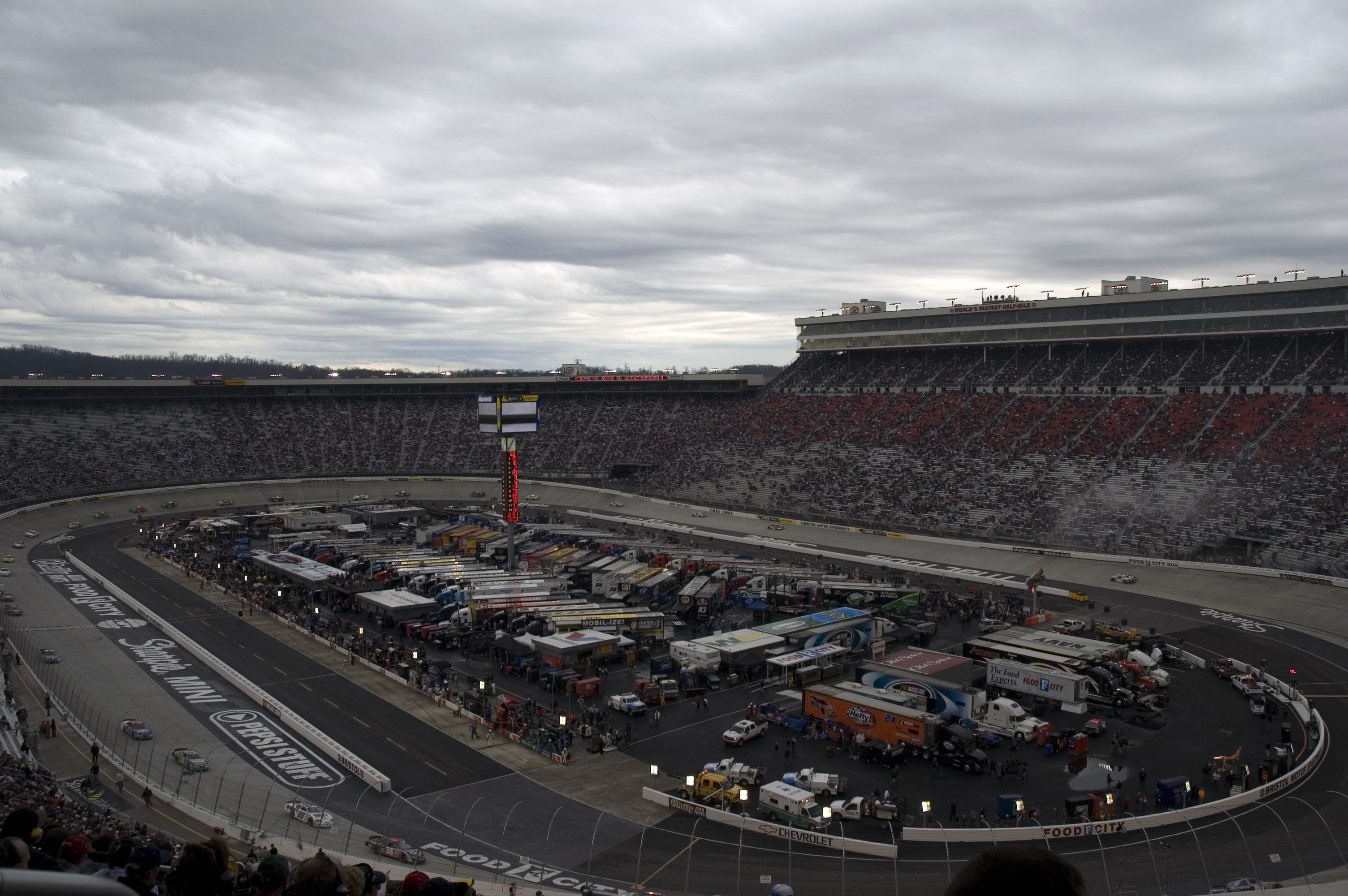
Bristol Motor Speedway, the circuit where the race was held.

The Bristol Motor Speedway, formerly known as Bristol International Raceway and Bristol Raceway, is a NASCAR short track venue located in Bristol, Tennessee. Constructed in 1960, it held its first NASCAR race on July 30, 1961. Despite its short length, Bristol is among the most popular tracks on the NASCAR schedule because of its distinct features, which include extraordinarily steep banking, an all concrete surface, two pit roads, and stadium-like seating. It has also been named one of the loudest NASCAR tracks.

==== Entry list ====
- (R) denotes rookie driver.

#	Driver	Team	Make	Sponsor
0	Nate Moeller	Wayne Peterson Racing	Ford	Ocean Pipe Works
1	Jake Finch	Phoenix Racing	Toyota	Phoenix Construction
2	Andrés Pérez de Lara	Rev Racing	Chevrolet	Max Siegel Inc.
03	Alex Clubb	Clubb Racing Inc.	Ford	Race Parts Liquidators / Misfit Productions
06	Mitch Gibson	Wayne Peterson Racing	Toyota	Ocean Pipe Works
6	Lavar Scott (R)	Rev Racing	Chevrolet	Max Siegel Inc.
9	Logan Misuraca	Rev Racing	Chevrolet	Clean Harbors
10	Cody Dennison (R)	Fast Track Racing	Toyota	Timcast
11	Zachary Tinkle	Fast Track Racing	Toyota	Racing for Rescues
12	Eric Caudell	Fast Track Racing	Ford	CCM Racing
15	Kris Wright	Venturini Motorsports	Toyota	FNB Corporation
17	Marco Andretti	Cook Racing Technologies	Chevrolet	Group 1001
18	William Sawalich	Joe Gibbs Racing	Toyota	Starkey / SoundGear
20	Gio Ruggiero (R)	Venturini Motorsports	Toyota	JBL
22	Amber Balcaen	Venturini Motorsports	Toyota	ICON Direct
23	Tyler Reif	Sigma Performance Services	Chevrolet	SPS / GMS Fabrication
25	Toni Breidinger	Venturini Motorsports	Toyota	Sunoco
27	Tim Richmond	Richmond Motorsports	Toyota	Immigration Law Center
28	Connor Zilisch (R)	Pinnacle Racing Group	Chevrolet	Chevrolet / Silver Hare Development
31	Tim Goulet	Rise Motorsports	Chevrolet	Max Buchanan Foundation
32	Christian Rose	AM Racing	Ford	West Virginia Department of Tourism
33	Lawless Alan	Reaume Brothers Racing	Ford	AutoParkIt.com
35	Greg Van Alst	Greg Van Alst Motorsports	Ford	Phil's Heating & Air
39	D. L. Wilson	CW Motorsports	Toyota	Heart O' Texas Speedway / ETR
48	Brad Smith	Brad Smith Motorsports	Ford	Ski's Graphics
55	Dean Thompson	Venturini Motorsports	Toyota	Thompson Pipe Group
71	Dawson Sutton	Hettinger Racing	Chevrolet	Rackley Roofing
73	Andy Jankowiak	KLAS Motorsports	Toyota	Acacia Energy
82	Corey Day	Pinnacle Racing Group	Chevrolet	HendrickCars.com
93	Brian Clubb	CW Motorsports	Ford	Race Parts Liquidators / Misfit Productions
95	Andrew Patterson	MAN Motorsports	Toyota	Winsupply / SCS Gearbox
97	Landen Lewis	CR7 Motorsports	Chevrolet	Grant County Mulch
98	Dale Shearer	Shearer Speed Racing	Toyota	Shearer Speed Racing
99	Michael Maples (R)	Fast Track Racing	Chevrolet	Don Ray Petroleum LLC
Official entry list

== Practice ==
The first and only practice session was held on Thursday, September 19, at 1:00 PM EST, and would last for 45 minutes. William Sawalich, driving for Joe Gibbs Racing, would set the fastest time in the session, with a lap of 15.384, and a speed of 124.727 mph (200.729 km/h).

Pos.	#	Driver	Team	Make	Time	Speed
1	18	William Sawalich	Joe Gibbs Racing	Toyota	15.384	124.727
2	28	Connor Zilisch (R)	Pinnacle Racing Group	Chevrolet	15.392	124.662
3	2	Andrés Pérez de Lara	Rev Racing	Chevrolet	15.550	123.395
Full practice results

== Qualifying ==
Qualifying was held on Thursday, September 19, at 2:00 PM EST. The qualifying system used is a multi-car, multi-lap based system. All drivers will be on track for a 20-minute timed session, and whoever sets the fastest time in that session will win the pole.

Connor Zilisch, driving for Pinnacle Racing Group, would score the pole for the race, with a lap of 15.503, and a speed of 123.770 mph (199.189 km/h).

=== Qualifying results ===
Pos.	#	Driver	Team	Make	Time	Speed
1	28	Connor Zilisch (R)	Pinnacle Racing Group	Chevrolet	15.503	123.770
2	18	William Sawalich	Joe Gibbs Racing	Toyota	15.546	123.427
3	2	Andrés Pérez de Lara	Rev Racing	Chevrolet	15.560	123.316
4	97	Landen Lewis	CR7 Motorsports	Chevrolet	15.653	122.584
5	23	Tyler Reif	Sigma Performance Services	Chevrolet	15.671	122.443
6	20	Gio Ruggiero (R)	Venturini Motorsports	Toyota	15.709	122.147
7	71	Dawson Sutton	Hettinger Racing	Chevrolet	15.729	121.991
8	82	Corey Day	Pinnacle Racing Group	Chevrolet	15.754	121.798
9	1	Jake Finch	Phoenix Racing	Toyota	15.777	121.620
10	55	Dean Thompson	Venturini Motorsports	Toyota	15.779	121.605
11	33	Lawless Alan	Reaume Brothers Racing	Ford	15.866	120.938
12	32	Christian Rose	AM Racing	Ford	15.881	120.824
13	9	Logan Misuraca	Rev Racing	Chevrolet	15.911	120.596
14	15	Kris Wright	Venturini Motorsports	Toyota	15.956	120.256
15	95	Andrew Patterson	MAN Motorsports	Toyota	15.961	120.218
16	73	Andy Jankowiak	KLAS Motorsports	Toyota	15.992	119.985
17	17	Marco Andretti	Cook Racing Technologies	Chevrolet	16.041	119.618
18	35	Greg Van Alst	Greg Van Alst Motorsports	Ford	16.146	118.841
19	22	Amber Balcaen	Venturini Motorsports	Toyota	16.164	118.708
20	11	Zachary Tinkle	Fast Track Racing	Toyota	16.269	117.942
21	25	Toni Breidinger	Venturini Motorsports	Toyota	16.301	117.711
22	27	Tim Richmond	Richmond Motorsports	Toyota	16.443	116.694
23	39	D. L. Wilson	CW Motorsports	Toyota	16.806	114.174
24	06	Mitch Gibson	Wayne Peterson Racing	Toyota	16.960	113.137
25	12	Eric Caudell	Fast Track Racing	Ford	17.037	112.625
26	6	Lavar Scott (R)	Rev Racing	Chevrolet	17.097	112.230
27	99	Michael Maples (R)	Fast Track Racing	Chevrolet	17.133	111.994
28	03	Alex Clubb	Clubb Racing Inc.	Ford	17.278	111.055
29	98	Dale Shearer	Shearer Speed Racing	Toyota	17.456	109.922
30	31	Tim Goulet	Rise Motorsports	Chevrolet	17.752	108.089
31	0	Nate Moeller	Wayne Peterson Racing	Ford	21.399	89.668
32	93	Brian Clubb	CW Motorsports	Ford	21.711	88.379
33	10	Cody Dennison (R)	Fast Track Racing	Toyota	–	–
34	48	Brad Smith	Brad Smith Motorsports	Ford	–	–
Official qualifying results

== Race results ==
Fin	St	#	Driver	Team	Make	Laps	Led	Status	Pts
1	2	18	William Sawalich	Joe Gibbs Racing	Toyota	205	102	Running	48
2	4	97	Landen Lewis	CR7 Motorsports	Chevrolet	205	80	Running	43
3	26	6	Lavar Scott	Rev Racing	Chevrolet	205	0	Running	41
4	3	2	Andrés Pérez de Lara	Rev Racing	Chevrolet	205	0	Running	40
5	10	55	Dean Thompson	Venturini Motorsports	Toyota	205	0	Running	39
6	5	23	Tyler Reif	Sigma Performance Services	Chevrolet	205	0	Running	38
7	8	82	Corey Day	Pinnacle Racing Group	Chevrolet	205	0	Running	37
8	9	1	Jake Finch	Phoenix Racing	Toyota	205	0	Running	36
9	11	33	Lawless Alan	Reaume Brothers Racing	Ford	205	0	Running	35
10	16	73	Andy Jankowiak	KLAS Motorspots	Toyota	205	0	Running	34
11	20	11	Zachary Tinkle	Fast Track Racing	Toyota	204	0	Running	33
12	21	25	Toni Breidinger	Venturini Motorsports	Toyota	204	0	Running	32
13	14	15	Kris Wright	Venturini Motorsports	Toyota	201	0	Running	31
14	25	12	Eric Caudell	Fast Track Racing	Ford	201	0	Running	30
15	6	20	Gio Ruggiero	Venturini Motorsports	Toyota	199	0	Running	29
16	22	27	Tim Richmond	Richmond Motorsports	Toyota	198	0	Running	28
17	29	10	Cody Dennison	Fast Track Racing	Toyota	198	0	Running	27
18	15	95	Andrew Patterson	MAN Motorsports	Toyota	194	0	Accident	26
19	28	03	Alex Clubb	Clubb Racing Inc.	Ford	192	0	Running	25
20	12	32	Christian Rose	AM Racing	Ford	190	0	Mechanical	24
21	18	35	Greg Van Alst	Greg Van Alst Motorsports	Ford	139	0	Accident	23
22	17	17	Marco Andretti	Cook Racing Technologies	Chevrolet	139	0	Accident	22
23	23	39	D.L. Wilson	CW Motorsports	Toyota	108	0	Mechanical	21
24	27	99	Michael Maples	Fast Track Racing	Chevrolet	89	0	Accident	20
25	19	22	Amber Balcaen	Venturini Motorsports	Toyota	76	0	Accident	19
26	1	28	Connor Zilisch	Pinnacle Racing Group	Chevrolet	64	23	Accident	18
27	13	9	Logan Misuraca	Rev Racing	Chevrolet	61	0	Accident	17
28	31	31	Tim Goulet	Rise Motorsports	Chevrolet	45	0	Too Slow	16
29	33	98	Dale Shearer	Shearer Speed Racing	Toyota	29	0	Brakes	15
30	24	06	Nate Moeller	Wayne Peterson Racing	Ford	17	0	Mechanical	14
31	30	93	Brian Clubb	CW Motorsports	Ford	13	0	Mechanical	13
32	32	48	Brad Smith	Brad Smith Motorsports	Ford	12	0	Mechanical	12
33	7	71	Dawson Sutton	Hettinger Racing	Chevrolet	4	0	Accident	11
34	34	0	Mitch Gibson	Wayne Peterson Racing	Toyota	0	0	Did Not Start	10

== Standings after the race ==
Drivers' Championship standings (ARCA Main)

	Pos	Driver	Points
	1	Andrés Pérez de Lara	844
	2	Lavar Scott	792 (-52)
	3	Kris Wright	760 (–84)
	4	Toni Breidinger	718 (–126)
1	5	Christian Rose	716 (–128)
	6	Amber Balcaen	666 (–178)
1	7	Cody Dennison	632 (–212)
1	8	Michael Maples	626 (–218)
	9	Alex Clubb	610 (–234)
	10	William Sawalich	592 (–252)

Drivers' Championship standings (ARCA East)

	Pos	Driver	Points
	1	William Sawalich	402
	2	Connor Zilisch	390 (-12)
	3	Gio Ruggiero	352 (–50)
	4	Zachary Tinkle	321 (–81)
	5	D. L. Wilson	298 (–103)
	6	Cody Dennison	297 (–104)
	7	Michael Maples	282 (–120)
	8	Rita Goulet	231 (–171)
2	9	Lavar Scott	198 (–204)
	10	Andrés Pérez de Lara	197 (–205)

- Note: Only the first 10 positions are included for the driver standings.

Previous race: 2024 General Tire 100 at The Glen	ARCA Menards Series; 2024 season	Next race: 2024 Reese's 150

Previous race: 2024 Sprecher 150	ARCA Menards Series East; 2024 season	Next race: 2025 Pensacola 150
