= 2026 LiUNA! 150 =

NASCAR Craftsman Truck Series race at Lime Rock Park

Race details
- Race 14 of 25 in the 2026 NASCAR Craftsman Truck Series
- Date: July 11, 2026
- Location: Lime Rock Park in Lakeville, Connecticut
- Course: Permanent racing facility
- Course length: 1.530 miles (2.462 km)
- Distance: 100 laps, 150 mi (241.402 km)
- Average speed: 57.929 miles per hour (93.228 km/h)

Pole position
Driver	Layne Riggs	Front Row Motorsports
- Time: 53.683

Most laps led
Driver	Layne Riggs	Front Row Motorsports
- Laps: 48

Fastest lap
Driver	Kaden Honeycutt	Tricon Garage
- Time: 55.350

Winner
No. 9	Grant Enfinger	CR7 Motorsports

Television in the United States
- Network: FS1
- Announcers: Eric Brennan, Michael Waltrip, and Todd Bodine

Radio in the United States
- Radio: NRN
- Booth announcers: Kurt Becker and Kyle Rickey
- Turn announcers: Dan Hubbard (Turns 1–4), Tim Catalfamo (Turn 5), and Nathan Prouty (Turns 6–7)

The 2026 LiUNA! 150 was a NASCAR Craftsman Truck Series race held on Saturday, July 11, 2026, at Lime Rock Park in Lakeville, Connecticut. Contested over 100 laps on the 1.530-mile (2.462 km) asphalt road course, it was the 14th race of the 2026 NASCAR Craftsman Truck Series season, and the second running of the event.

In a caution-filled final stage, Grant Enfinger, driving for CR7 Motorsports, took advantage of late troubles with Layne Riggs and Kaden Honeycutt, and survived numerous late restarts to earn his 13th career NASCAR Craftsman Truck Series win, and his first of the season, snapping a winless drought dating back to the 2024 Baptist Health 200. Pole-sitter Riggs won the first stage, leading a race-high 48 laps, while Honeycutt won the second stage and led 14 laps. Landen Lewis finished second, and Honeycutt finished third. Parker Kligerman and Christian Eckes rounded out the top five, while Daniel Hemric, Andrés Pérez de Lara, Tanner Gray, Stewart Friesen, and Colin Braun rounded out the top ten.

== Report ==
=== Background ===
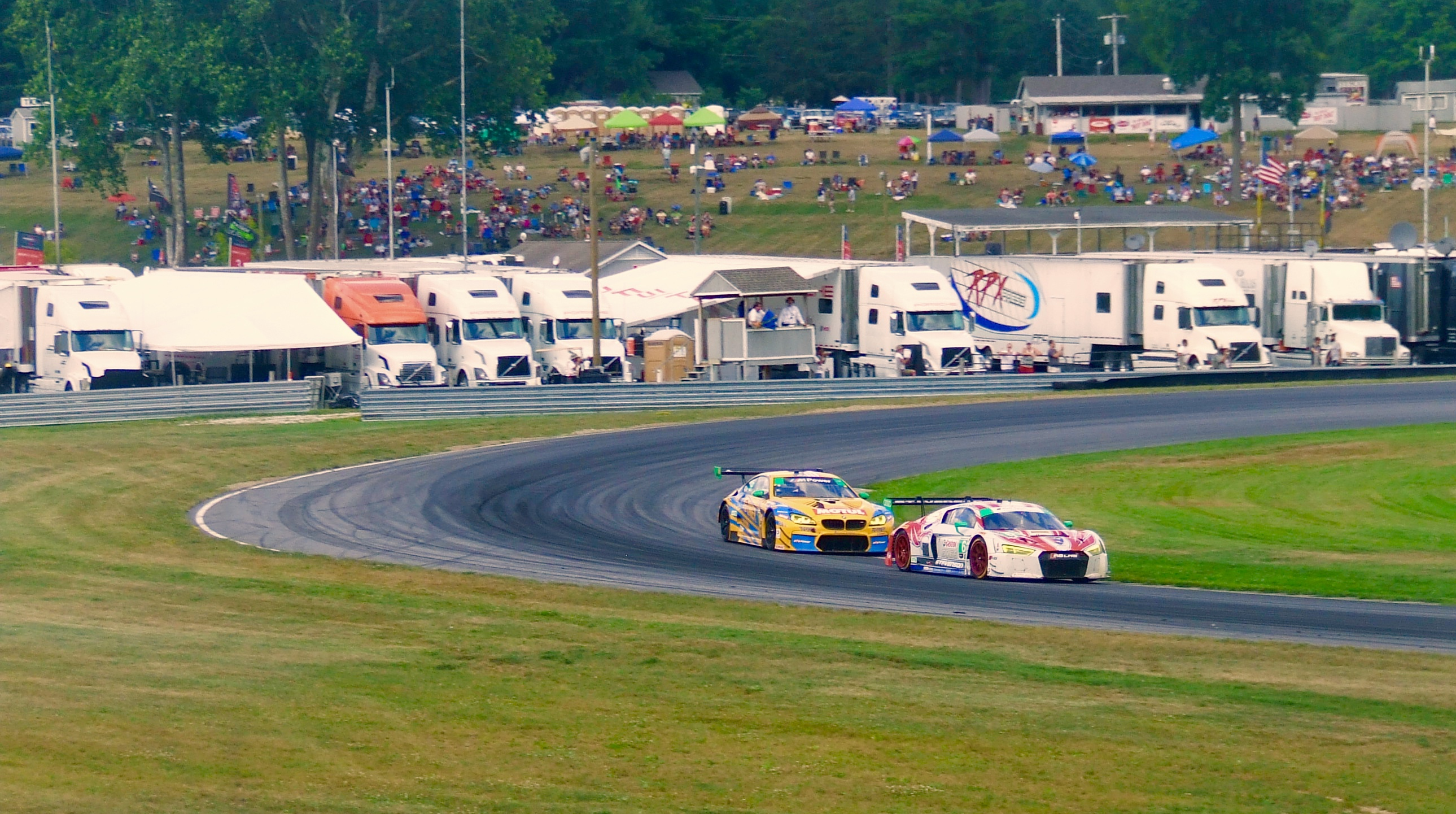
Lime Rock Park, the track where the race was held.

Lime Rock Park is a natural-terrain motorsport road racing venue located in Lakeville, Connecticut, United States, a hamlet in the town of Salisbury, in the state's northwest corner. Built in 1956, it is the nation's third oldest continuously operating road racing venue, behind Road America (1955) and Willow Springs International Motorsports Park (1953). The track was owned by Skip Barber from 1984 to April 2021, a former race car driver who started the Skip Barber Racing School in 1975. Now, it is owned by Lime Rock Group, LLC. It was listed on the National Register of Historic Places in 2009.

The Laborers' International Union of North America (LiUNA) was announced as the title sponsor for the race as they did for the previous year.

=== Entry list ===
- (R) denotes rookie driver.

#	Driver	Team	Make
1	Thomas Annunziata	Tricon Garage	Toyota
2	Jackson Lee	Team Reaume	Ford
5	Graham Doyle	Tricon Garage	Toyota
7	Connor Mosack	Spire Motorsports	Chevrolet
9	Grant Enfinger	CR7 Motorsports	Chevrolet
10	Corey LaJoie	Kaulig Racing	Ram
11	Kaden Honeycutt	Tricon Garage	Toyota
12	Brenden Queen (R)	Kaulig Racing	Ram
13	Cole Butcher (R)	ThorSport Racing	Ford
14	Mini Tyrrell (R)	Kaulig Racing	Ram
15	Tanner Gray	Tricon Garage	Toyota
16	Justin Haley	Kaulig Racing	Ram
17	Gio Ruggiero	Tricon Garage	Toyota
18	Tyler Ankrum	McAnally–Hilgemann Racing	Chevrolet
19	Daniel Hemric	McAnally–Hilgemann Racing	Chevrolet
22	Josh Reaume	Team Reaume	Ford
25	Colin Braun	Kaulig Racing	Ram
26	Dawson Sutton	Rackley W.A.R.	Chevrolet
33	Frankie Muniz	Team Reaume	Ford
34	Layne Riggs	Front Row Motorsports	Ford
38	Chandler Smith	Front Row Motorsports	Ford
42	Ben Maier	Niece Motorsports	Chevrolet
44	Andrés Pérez de Lara	Niece Motorsports	Chevrolet
45	Landen Lewis	Niece Motorsports	Chevrolet
52	Stewart Friesen	Halmar Friesen Racing	Toyota
62	Wesley Slimp	Halmar Friesen Racing	Toyota
76	Louis Foster	Freedom Racing Enterprises	Chevrolet
77	Parker Kligerman	Spire Motorsports	Chevrolet
81	Kris Wright	McAnally–Hilgemann Racing	Chevrolet
88	Ty Majeski	ThorSport Racing	Ford
91	Christian Eckes	McAnally–Hilgemann Racing	Chevrolet
98	Jake Garcia	ThorSport Racing	Ford
99	Ben Rhodes	ThorSport Racing	Ford
Official entry list

== Practice ==
The first and only practice session was held on Saturday, July 11, at 9:00 AM ET, and lasted for 50 minutes.

Chandler Smith, driving for Front Row Motorsports, set the fastest time in the session, with a lap of 54.312 seconds, and a speed of 97.967 miles per hour (157.663 km/h).

Pos.	#	Driver	Team	Make	Time	Speed
1	38	Chandler Smith	Front Row Motorsports	Ford	54.312	97.967
2	7	Connor Mosack	Spire Motorsports	Chevrolet	54.366	97.870
3	99	Ben Rhodes	ThorSport Racing	Ford	54.520	97.594
Full practice results

== Qualifying ==
Qualifying was held on Saturday, July 11, at 10:05 AM ET. Since Lime Rock Park is a road course, the qualifying procedure used was a two-group system with one round. Drivers were separated into two groups, A and B. Each driver had multiple laps to set a time. Whoever set the fastest time between both groups won the pole.

Under a 2021 rule change, the timing line in road course qualifying is "not" the start-finish line. Instead, the timing line for qualifying was set at the exit of the West Bend in Turn 6. Layne Riggs, driving for Front Row Motorsports, qualified on pole position with a lap of 53.683 seconds, and a speed of 99.115 miles per hour (159.510 km/h).

No drivers failed to qualify.

=== Qualifying results ===
Pos.	#	Driver	Team	Make	Time	Speed
1	34	Layne Riggs	Front Row Motorsports	Ford	53.683	99.115
2	7	Connor Mosack	Spire Motorsports	Chevrolet	53.738	99.014
3	11	Kaden Honeycutt	Tricon Garage	Toyota	53.773	98.949
4	1	Thomas Annunziata	Tricon Garage	Toyota	53.823	98.857
5	88	Ty Majeski	ThorSport Racing	Ford	53.833	98.839
6	45	Landen Lewis	Niece Motorsports	Chevrolet	53.959	98.608
7	17	Gio Ruggiero	Tricon Garage	Toyota	54.157	98.248
8	19	Daniel Hemric	McAnally–Hilgemann Racing	Chevrolet	54.200	98.170
9	38	Chandler Smith	Front Row Motorsports	Ford	54.203	98.164
10	98	Jake Garcia	ThorSport Racing	Ford	54.219	98.135
11	18	Tyler Ankrum	McAnally–Hilgemann Racing	Chevrolet	54.310	97.971
12	9	Grant Enfinger	CR7 Motorsports	Chevrolet	54.372	97.859
13	91	Christian Eckes	McAnally–Hilgemann Racing	Chevrolet	54.383	97.839
14	44	Andrés Pérez de Lara	Niece Motorsports	Chevrolet	54.411	97.789
15	42	Ben Maier	Niece Motorsports	Chevrolet	54.462	97.697
16	77	Parker Kligerman	Spire Motorsports	Chevrolet	54.562	97.518
17	99	Ben Rhodes	ThorSport Racing	Ford	54.579	97.488
18	52	Stewart Friesen	Halmar Friesen Racing	Toyota	54.628	97.401
19	81	Kris Wright	McAnally–Hilgemann Racing	Chevrolet	54.660	97.344
20	15	Tanner Gray	Tricon Garage	Toyota	54.716	97.244
21	26	Dawson Sutton	Rackley W.A.R.	Chevrolet	54.806	97.084
22	13	Cole Butcher (R)	ThorSport Racing	Ford	55.206	96.381
23	16	Justin Haley	Kaulig Racing	Ram	55.449	95.958
24	62	Wesley Slimp	Halmar Friesen Racing	Toyota	55.465	95.931
25	10	Corey LaJoie	Kaulig Racing	Ram	55.561	95.765
26	76	Louis Foster	Freedom Racing Enterprises	Chevrolet	55.620	95.663
27	5	Graham Doyle	Tricon Garage	Toyota	55.807	95.343
28	14	Mini Tyrrell (R)	Kaulig Racing	Ram	55.944	95.109
29	12	Brenden Queen (R)	Kaulig Racing	Ram	56.108	94.831
30	2	Jackson Lee	Team Reaume	Ford	56.196	94.683
31	33	Frankie Muniz	Team Reaume	Ford	57.441	92.631
Qualified by owner's points
32	22	Josh Reaume	Team Reaume	Ford	57.926	91.855
33	25	Colin Braun	Kaulig Racing	Ram	—	—
Official qualifying results
Official starting lineup

== Race results ==
=== Stage Results ===
Stage One Laps: 30

Pos.	#	Driver	Team	Make	Pts
1	34	Layne Riggs	Front Row Motorsports	Ford	10
2	11	Kaden Honeycutt	Tricon Garage	Toyota	9
3	45	Landen Lewis	Niece Motorsports	Chevrolet	8
4	7	Connor Mosack	Spire Motorsports	Chevrolet	7
5	1	Thomas Annunziata	Tricon Garage	Toyota	6
6	88	Ty Majeski	ThorSport Racing	Ford	5
7	17	Gio Ruggiero	Tricon Garage	Toyota	4
8	19	Daniel Hemric	McAnally–Hilgemann Racing	Chevrolet	3
9	9	Grant Enfinger	CR7 Motorsports	Chevrolet	2
10	44	Andrés Pérez de Lara	Niece Motorsports	Chevrolet	1

Stage Two Laps: 30

Pos.	#	Driver	Team	Make	Pts
1	11	Kaden Honeycutt	Tricon Garage	Toyota	10
2	34	Layne Riggs	Front Row Motorsports	Ford	9
3	9	Grant Enfinger	CR7 Motorsports	Chevrolet	8
4	19	Daniel Hemric	McAnally–Hilgemann Racing	Chevrolet	7
5	44	Andrés Pérez de Lara	Niece Motorsports	Chevrolet	6
6	18	Tyler Ankrum	McAnally–Hilgemann Racing	Chevrolet	5
7	77	Parker Kligerman	Spire Motorsports	Chevrolet	4
8	98	Jake Garcia	ThorSport Racing	Ford	3
9	15	Tanner Gray	Tricon Garage	Toyota	2
10	13	Cole Butcher (R)	ThorSport Racing	Ford	1

=== Final Stage Results ===
Stage Three Laps: 40

Fin	St	#	Driver	Team	Make	Laps	Led	Status	Pts
1	12	9	Grant Enfinger	CR7 Motorsports	Chevrolet	100	5	Running	65
2	6	45	Landen Lewis	Niece Motorsports	Chevrolet	100	0	Running	43
3	3	11	Kaden Honeycutt	Tricon Garage	Toyota	100	14	Running	54
4	16	77	Parker Kligerman	Spire Motorsports	Chevrolet	100	0	Running	37
5	13	91	Christian Eckes	McAnally–Hilgemann Racing	Chevrolet	100	0	Running	32
6	8	19	Daniel Hemric	McAnally–Hilgemann Racing	Chevrolet	100	0	Running	41
7	14	44	Andrés Pérez de Lara	Niece Motorsports	Chevrolet	100	0	Running	37
8	20	15	Tanner Gray	Tricon Garage	Toyota	100	0	Running	31
9	18	52	Stewart Friesen	Halmar Friesen Racing	Toyota	100	1	Running	28
10	33	25	Colin Braun	Kaulig Racing	Ram	100	0	Running	27
11	22	13	Cole Butcher (R)	ThorSport Racing	Ford	100	11	Running	27
12	29	12	Brenden Queen (R)	Kaulig Racing	Ram	100	0	Running	25
13	30	2	Jackson Lee	Team Reaume	Ford	100	0	Running	24
14	23	16	Justin Haley	Kaulig Racing	Ram	100	0	Running	23
15	21	26	Dawson Sutton	Rackley W.A.R.	Chevrolet	100	0	Running	22
16	24	62	Wesley Slimp	Halmar Friesen Racing	Toyota	100	0	Running	21
17	19	81	Kris Wright	McAnally–Hilgemann Racing	Chevrolet	100	0	Running	20
18	2	7	Connor Mosack	Spire Motorsports	Chevrolet	100	0	Running	26
19	27	5	Graham Doyle	Tricon Garage	Toyota	100	0	Running	18
20	7	17	Gio Ruggiero	Tricon Garage	Toyota	100	21	Running	21
21	26	76	Louis Foster	Freedom Racing Enterprises	Chevrolet	100	0	Running	16
22	10	98	Jake Garcia	ThorSport Racing	Ford	100	0	Running	18
23	1	34	Layne Riggs	Front Row Motorsports	Ford	99	48	Running	33
24	28	14	Mini Tyrrell (R)	Kaulig Racing	Ram	99	0	Running	13
25	11	18	Tyler Ankrum	McAnally–Hilgemann Racing	Chevrolet	98	0	Running	17
26	31	33	Frankie Muniz	Team Reaume	Ford	98	0	Running	11
27	32	22	Josh Reaume	Team Reaume	Ford	98	0	Running	10
28	25	10	Corey LaJoie	Kaulig Racing	Ram	90	0	Engine	9
29	4	1	Thomas Annunziata	Tricon Garage	Toyota	79	0	Engine	14
30	9	38	Chandler Smith	Front Row Motorsports	Ford	56	0	Driveshaft	7
31	17	99	Ben Rhodes	ThorSport Racing	Ford	50	0	Accident	6
32	5	88	Ty Majeski	ThorSport Racing	Ford	44	0	Accident	10
33	15	42	Ben Maier	Niece Motorsports	Chevrolet	33	0	Electrical	4
Official race results

=== Race statistics ===
- Lead changes: 9 among 6 different drivers
- Cautions/Laps: 7 for 39 laps
- Red flags: 1
- Time of race: 2 hours, 33 minutes and 5 seconds
- Average speed: 57.929 miles per hour (93.228 km/h)

== Standings after the race ==
Drivers' Championship standings

	Pos	Driver	Points
	1	Layne Riggs	595
	2	Kaden Honeycutt	551 (–44)
	3	Chandler Smith	441 (–154)
1	4	Christian Eckes	440 (–155)
1	5	Gio Ruggiero	431 (–164)
	6	Ty Majeski	363 (–232)
	7	Ben Rhodes	355 (–240)
	8	Daniel Hemric	354 (–241)
2	9	Grant Enfinger	343 (–252)
1	10	Tyler Ankrum	318 (–277)
Official driver's standings

Manufacturers' Championship standings

Pos	Manufacturer	Points
1	Toyota	577
2	Ford	560 (–17)
3	Chevrolet	558 (–19)
4	Ram	378 (–199)

- Note: Only the first 10 positions are included for the driver standings.

Previous race: 2026 Navy 250	NASCAR Craftsman Truck Series; 2026 season	Next race: 2026 FaithFest 250
