= 2023 O'Reilly Auto Parts 150 at Mid-Ohio =

14th race of the 2023 NASCAR Craftsman Truck Series

Race details
- Race 14 of 23 of the 2023 NASCAR Craftsman Truck Series
- Date: July 8, 2023
- Official name: 2nd Annual O'Reilly Auto Parts 150 at Mid-Ohio
- Location: Mid-Ohio Sports Car Course, Lexington, Ohio
- Course: Permanent racing facility
- Course length: 2.400 miles (3.862 km)
- Distance: 67 laps, 151 mi (243 km)
- Scheduled distance: 67 laps, 151 mi (243 km)
- Average speed: 54.441 mph (87.614 km/h)

Pole position
Driver	Corey Heim	Tricon Garage
- Time: 1:26.137

Most laps led
Driver	Corey Heim	Tricon Garage
- Laps: 30

Winner
No. 11	Corey Heim	Tricon Garage

Television in the United States
- Network: FS1
- Announcers: Jamie Little, Phil Parsons, and Michael Waltrip

Radio in the United States
- Radio: MRN

The 2023 O'Reilly Auto Parts 150 at Mid-Ohio was the 14th stock car race of the 2023 NASCAR Craftsman Truck Series, and the final iteration of the event. The race was held on Saturday, July 8, 2023, in Lexington, Ohio at Mid-Ohio Sports Car Course, a 2.400 miles (3.862 km) permanent road course. The race took the scheduled 67 laps to complete. Corey Heim, driving for Tricon Garage, would start on the pole and dominate the majority of the race, leading a race-high 30 laps, and earning his fourth career NASCAR Craftsman Truck Series win, and his second of the season. To fill out the podium, Zane Smith, driving for Front Row Motorsports, and Christian Eckes, driving for McAnally-Hilgemann Racing, would finish 2nd and 3rd, respectively.

== Background ==
Mid-Ohio Sports Car Course is a road course auto racing facility located in Troy Township, Morrow County, Ohio, United States, just outside the village of Lexington. Mid-Ohio has also colloquially become a term for the entire north-central region of the state, from south of Sandusky to the north of Columbus. It hosts a number of racing series such as IndyCar, IMSA WeatherTech Sportscar Championship, and the NASCAR Craftsman Truck Series, along with other club events such has SCCA and National Auto Sport Association.

=== Entry list ===
- (R) denotes rookie driver.

#	Driver	Team	Make
1	William Sawalich	Tricon Garage	Toyota
02	Will Rodgers	Young's Motorsports	Chevrolet
2	Nick Sanchez (R)	Rev Racing	Chevrolet
04	Landen Lewis	Roper Racing	Chevrolet
4	Chase Purdy	Kyle Busch Motorsports	Chevrolet
5	Dean Thompson	Tricon Garage	Toyota
7	Marco Andretti	Spire Motorsports	Chevrolet
9	Colby Howard	CR7 Motorsports	Chevrolet
11	Corey Heim	Tricon Garage	Toyota
12	Spencer Boyd	Young's Motorsports	Chevrolet
13	Hailie Deegan	ThorSport Racing	Ford
15	Tanner Gray	Tricon Garage	Toyota
16	Tyler Ankrum	Hattori Racing Enterprises	Toyota
17	Taylor Gray (R)	Tricon Garage	Toyota
19	Christian Eckes	McAnally-Hilgemann Racing	Chevrolet
20	Matt Mills	Young's Motorsports	Chevrolet
22	Austin Wayne Self	AM Racing	Ford
23	Grant Enfinger	GMS Racing	Chevrolet
24	Rajah Caruth (R)	GMS Racing	Chevrolet
25	Matt DiBenedetto	Rackley WAR	Chevrolet
30	Ryan Vargas	On Point Motorsports	Toyota
32	Bret Holmes (R)	Bret Holmes Racing	Chevrolet
33	Josh Reaume	Reaume Brothers Racing	Ford
34	Caleb Costner	Reaume Brothers Racing	Ford
35	Jake Garcia (R)	McAnally-Hilgemann Racing	Chevrolet
38	Zane Smith	Front Row Motorsports	Ford
41	Conor Daly	Niece Motorsports	Chevrolet
42	Carson Hocevar	Niece Motorsports	Chevrolet
43	Daniel Dye (R)	GMS Racing	Chevrolet
45	Lawless Alan	Niece Motorsports	Chevrolet
46	Dale Quarterley	G2G Racing	Toyota
51	Jack Wood	Kyle Busch Motorsports	Chevrolet
52	Stewart Friesen	Halmar Friesen Racing	Toyota
56	Timmy Hill	Hill Motorsports	Toyota
66	Conner Jones	ThorSport Racing	Ford
88	Matt Crafton	ThorSport Racing	Ford
98	Ty Majeski	ThorSport Racing	Ford
99	Ben Rhodes	ThorSport Racing	Ford
Official entry list

== Practice ==
The first and only practice session was held on Friday, July 7, at 4:00 pm EST, and would last for 20 minutes. Ben Rhodes, driving for ThorSport Racing, would set the fastest time in the session, with a lap of 1:27.767, and an average speed of 92.618 mph (149.054 km/h).

Pos.	#	Driver	Team	Make	Time	Speed
1	99	Ben Rhodes	ThorSport Racing	Ford	1:27.767	92.618
2	42	Carson Hocevar	Niece Motorsports	Chevrolet	1:27.830	92.552
3	2	Nick Sanchez (R)	Rev Racing	Chevrolet	1:27.835	92.546
Full practice results

== Qualifying ==
Qualifying was held on Friday, July 7, at 4:30 pm EST. Since Mid-Ohio Sports Car Course is a road course, the qualifying system is a two group system, with two rounds. Drivers will be separated into two groups, Group A and Group B. Each driver will have multiple laps to set a time. The fastest 5 drivers from each group will advance to the final round. The fastest driver to set a time in that round will win the pole. Corey Heim, driving for Tricon Garage, would score the pole for the race, with a lap of 1:26.137, and an average speed of 94.371 mph (151.875 km/h).

Pos.	#	Driver	Team	Make	Time (R1)	Speed (R1)	Time (R2)	Speed (R2)
1	11	Corey Heim	Tricon Garage	Toyota	1:25.764	94.781	1:26.137	94.371
2	98	Ty Majeski	ThorSport Racing	Ford	1:26.524	93.948	1:26.428	94.053
3	2	Nick Sanchez (R)	Rev Racing	Chevrolet	1:26.692	93.766	1:26.559	93.911
4	19	Christian Eckes	McAnally-Hilgemann Racing	Chevrolet	1:26.801	93.649	1:26.766	93.686
5	23	Grant Enfinger	GMS Racing	Chevrolet	1:26.673	93.787	1:26.775	93.677
6	15	Tanner Gray	Tricon Garage	Toyota	1:26.764	93.689	1:26.909	93.532
7	7	Marco Andretti	Spire Motorsports	Chevrolet	1:26.972	93.465	1:27.279	93.136
8	1	William Sawalich	Tricon Garage	Toyota	1:27.156	93.267	1:27.797	92.586
9	51	Jack Wood	Kyle Busch Motorsports	Chevrolet	1:26.799	93.651	1:28.085	92.284
10	38	Zane Smith	Front Row Motorsports	Ford	1:26.901	93.541	—	—
Eliminated from Round 1
11	42	Carson Hocevar	Niece Motorsports	Chevrolet	1:26.935	93.504	—	—
12	99	Ben Rhodes	ThorSport Racing	Ford	1:27.054	93.377	—	—
13	16	Tyler Ankrum	Hattori Racing Enterprises	Toyota	1:27.194	93.227	—	—
14	25	Matt DiBenedetto	Rackley WAR	Chevrolet	1:27.205	93.215	—	—
15	17	Taylor Gray (R)	Tricon Garage	Toyota	1:27.281	93.134	—	—
16	02	Will Rodgers	Young's Motorsports	Chevrolet	1:27.333	93.078	—	—
17	43	Daniel Dye (R)	GMS Racing	Chevrolet	1:27.336	93.075	—	—
18	41	Conor Daly	Niece Motorsports	Chevrolet	1:27.576	92.820	—	—
19	24	Rajah Caruth (R)	GMS Racing	Chevrolet	1:27.754	92.632	—	—
20	5	Dean Thompson	Tricon Garage	Toyota	1:27.774	92.611	—	—
21	45	Lawless Alan	Niece Motorsports	Chevrolet	1:27.837	92.544	—	—
22	04	Landen Lewis	Roper Racing	Chevrolet	1:28.385	91.970	—	—
23	35	Jake Garcia (R)	McAnally-Hilgemann Racing	Chevrolet	1:28.428	91.926	—	—
24	4	Chase Purdy	Kyle Busch Motorsports	Chevrolet	1:28.612	91.735	—	—
25	88	Matt Crafton	ThorSport Racing	Ford	1:28.806	91.534	—	—
26	13	Hailie Deegan	ThorSport Racing	Ford	1:28.861	91.478	—	—
27	22	Austin Wayne Self	AM Racing	Ford	1:29.234	91.095	—	—
28	46	Dale Quarterley	G2G Racing	Toyota	1:29.326	91.002	—	—
29	30	Ryan Vargas	On Point Motorsports	Toyota	1:29.432	90.894	—	—
30	20	Matt Mills	Young's Motorsports	Chevrolet	1:29.480	90.845	—	—
31	66	Conner Jones	ThorSport Racing	Ford	1:29.620	90.703	—	—
Qualified by owner's points
32	32	Bret Holmes (R)	Bret Holmes Racing	Chevrolet	1:29.890	90.431	—	—
33	56	Timmy Hill	Hill Motorsports	Toyota	1:30.048	90.272	—	—
34	12	Spencer Boyd	Young's Motorsports	Chevrolet	1:30.637	89.685	—	—
35	52	Stewart Friesen	Halmar Friesen Racing	Toyota	—	—	—	—
36	9	Colby Howard	CR7 Motorsports	Chevrolet	—	—	—	—
Failed to qualify
37	33	Josh Reaume	Reaume Brothers Racing	Ford	1:30.021	90.299	—	—
38	34	Caleb Costner	Reaume Brothers Racing	Ford	1:32.720	87.670	—	—
Official qualifying results
Official starting lineup

== Race results ==
Stage 1 Laps: 15

Pos.	#	Driver	Team	Make	Pts
1	99	Ben Rhodes	ThorSport Racing	Ford	10
2	98	Ty Majeski	ThorSport Racing	Ford	9
3	2	Nick Sanchez (R)	Rev Racing	Chevrolet	8
4	11	Corey Heim	Tricon Garage	Toyota	7
5	19	Christian Eckes	McAnally-Hilgemann Racing	Chevrolet	6
6	02	Will Rodgers	Young's Motorsports	Chevrolet	5
7	38	Zane Smith	Front Row Motorsports	Ford	4
8	22	Austin Wayne Self	AM Racing	Ford	3
9	52	Stewart Friesen	Halmar Friesen Racing	Toyota	2
10	45	Lawless Alan	Niece Motorsports	Chevrolet	1

Stage 2 Laps: 20

Pos.	#	Driver	Team	Make	Pts
1	98	Ty Majeski	ThorSport Racing	Ford	10
2	11	Corey Heim	Tricon Garage	Toyota	9
3	99	Ben Rhodes	ThorSport Racing	Ford	8
4	38	Zane Smith	Front Row Motorsports	Ford	7
5	19	Christian Eckes	McAnally-Hilgemann Racing	Chevrolet	6
6	52	Stewart Friesen	Halmar Friesen Racing	Toyota	5
7	16	Tyler Ankrum	Hattori Racing Enterprises	Toyota	4
8	24	Rajah Caruth (R)	GMS Racing	Chevrolet	3
9	25	Matt DiBenedetto	Rackley WAR	Chevrolet	2
10	4	Chase Purdy	Kyle Busch Motorsports	Chevrolet	1

Stage 3 Laps: 32

Fin	St	#	Driver	Team	Make	Laps	Led	Status	Pts
1	1	11	Corey Heim	Tricon Garage	Toyota	67	30	Running	56
2	10	38	Zane Smith	Front Row Motorsports	Ford	67	0	Running	46
3	4	19	Christian Eckes	McAnally-Hilgemann Racing	Chevrolet	67	0	Running	46
4	35	52	Stewart Friesen	Halmar Friesen Racing	Toyota	67	0	Running	40
5	12	99	Ben Rhodes	ThorSport Racing	Ford	67	19	Running	50
6	25	88	Matt Crafton	ThorSport Racing	Ford	67	1	Running	31
7	2	98	Ty Majeksi	ThorSport Racing	Ford	67	17	Running	49
8	14	25	Matt DiBenedetto	Rackley WAR	Chevrolet	67	0	Running	31
9	3	2	Nick Sanchez (R)	Rev Racing	Chevrolet	67	0	Running	36
10	13	16	Tyler Ankrum	Hattori Racing Enterprises	Toyota	67	0	Running	31
11	5	23	Grant Enfinger	GMS Racing	Chevrolet	67	0	Running	26
12	11	42	Carson Hocevar	Niece Motorsports	Chevrolet	67	0	Running	25
13	24	4	Chase Purdy	Kyle Busch Motorsports	Chevrolet	67	0	Running	25
14	17	43	Daniel Dye (R)	GMS Racing	Chevrolet	67	0	Running	23
15	15	17	Taylor Gray (R)	Tricon Garage	Toyota	67	0	Running	22
16	23	35	Jake Garcia (R)	McAnally-Hilgemann Racing	Chevrolet	67	0	Running	21
17	21	45	Lawless Alan	Niece Motorsports	Chevrolet	67	0	Running	21
18	18	41	Conor Daly	Niece Motorsports	Chevrolet	67	0	Running	19
19	7	7	Marco Andretti	Spire Motorsports	Chevrolet	67	0	Running	18
20	6	15	Tanner Gray	Tricon Garage	Toyota	67	0	Running	17
21	33	56	Timmy Hill	Hill Motorsports	Toyota	67	0	Running	16
22	30	20	Matt Mills	Young's Motorsports	Chevrolet	67	0	Running	15
23	29	30	Ryan Vargas	On Point Motorsports	Toyota	67	0	Running	14
24	22	04	Landen Lewis	Roper Racing	Chevrolet	67	0	Running	13
25	34	12	Spencer Boyd	Young's Motorsports	Chevrolet	67	0	Running	12
26	26	13	Hailie Deegan	ThorSport Racing	Ford	67	0	Running	11
27	8	1	William Sawalich	Tricon Garage	Toyota	67	0	Running	10
28	31	66	Conner Jones	ThorSport Racing	Ford	66	0	Brakes	9
29	19	24	Rajah Caruth (R)	GMS Racing	Chevrolet	66	0	Running	11
30	27	22	Austin Wayne Self	AM Racing	Ford	66	0	Running	10
31	9	51	Jack Wood	Kyle Busch Motorsports	Chevrolet	65	0	Running	6
32	32	32	Bret Holmes (R)	Bret Holmes Racing	Chevrolet	65	0	Running	5
33	20	5	Dean Thompson	Tricon Garage	Toyota	59	0	Accident	4
34	16	02	Will Rodgers	Young's Motorsports	Chevrolet	54	0	Accident	8
35	28	46	Dale Quarterley	G2G Racing	Toyota	35	0	Overheating	2
36	36	9	Colby Howard	CR7 Motorsports	Chevrolet	21	0	Transmission	1
Official race results

== Standings after the race ==
Drivers' Championship standings

	Pos	Driver	Points
	1	Corey Heim	530
	2	Zane Smith	504 (-26)
1	3	Ty Majeski	479 (-51)
1	4	Ben Rhodes	477 (-53)
2	5	Grant Enfinger	469 (-61)
	6	Christian Eckes	450 (-80)
	7	Carson Hocevar	418 (-112)
	8	Matt DiBenedetto	389 (-141)
1	9	Nick Sanchez	386 (-144)
1	10	Matt Crafton	385 (-145)
Official driver's standings

- Note: Only the first 10 positions are included for the driver standings.

Previous race: 2023 Rackley Roofing 200	NASCAR Craftsman Truck Series; 2023 season	Next race: 2023 CRC Brakleen 150
