= 2023 General Tire 125 =

2nd race of the 2023 ARCA Menards Series East

Race details
- Race 2 of 8 of the 2023 ARCA Menards Series East
- Date: April 29, 2023
- Official name: 9th Annual General Tire 125
- Location: Dover Motor Speedway in Dover, Delaware
- Course: Permanent racing facility
- Course length: 1 miles (1.6 km)
- Distance: 127 laps, 127 mi (204 km)
- Scheduled distance: 125 laps, 125 mi (201 km)
- Average speed: 114.781 mph (184.722 km/h)

Pole position
Driver	William Sawalich	Joe Gibbs Racing
- Grid positions set by competition-based formula

Most laps led
Driver	Jake Finch	Venturini Motorsports
- Laps: 89

Winner
No. 20	Jake Finch	Venturini Motorsports

Television in the United States
- Network: FloRacing; CNBC (Tape Delayed)
- Announcers: Charles Krall

Radio in the United States
- Radio: ARCA Racing Network

The 2023 General Tire 125 was the second stock car race of the 2023 ARCA Menards Series East season, and the 9th running of the event. The race was originally scheduled to be held on Friday, April 28, 2023, but was postponed until Saturday, April 29, due to constant rain showers. The race was held at Dover Motor Speedway in Dover, Delaware, a 1-mile (1.6 km) permanent asphalt oval shaped speedway. It was originally scheduled to be contested over 125 laps, but was increased to 127 laps, due to a NASCAR overtime finish. In a wild finish, Jake Finch, driving for Venturini Motorsports, would hold off Landen Lewis in a side-by-side battle on the final restart to earn his first career ARCA Menards Series East win. Finch would also dominate the race, leading a race-high 89 laps. To fill out the podium, Luke Fenhaus, driving for Pinnacle Racing Group, would finish in 3rd, respectively.

== Report ==
=== Background ===
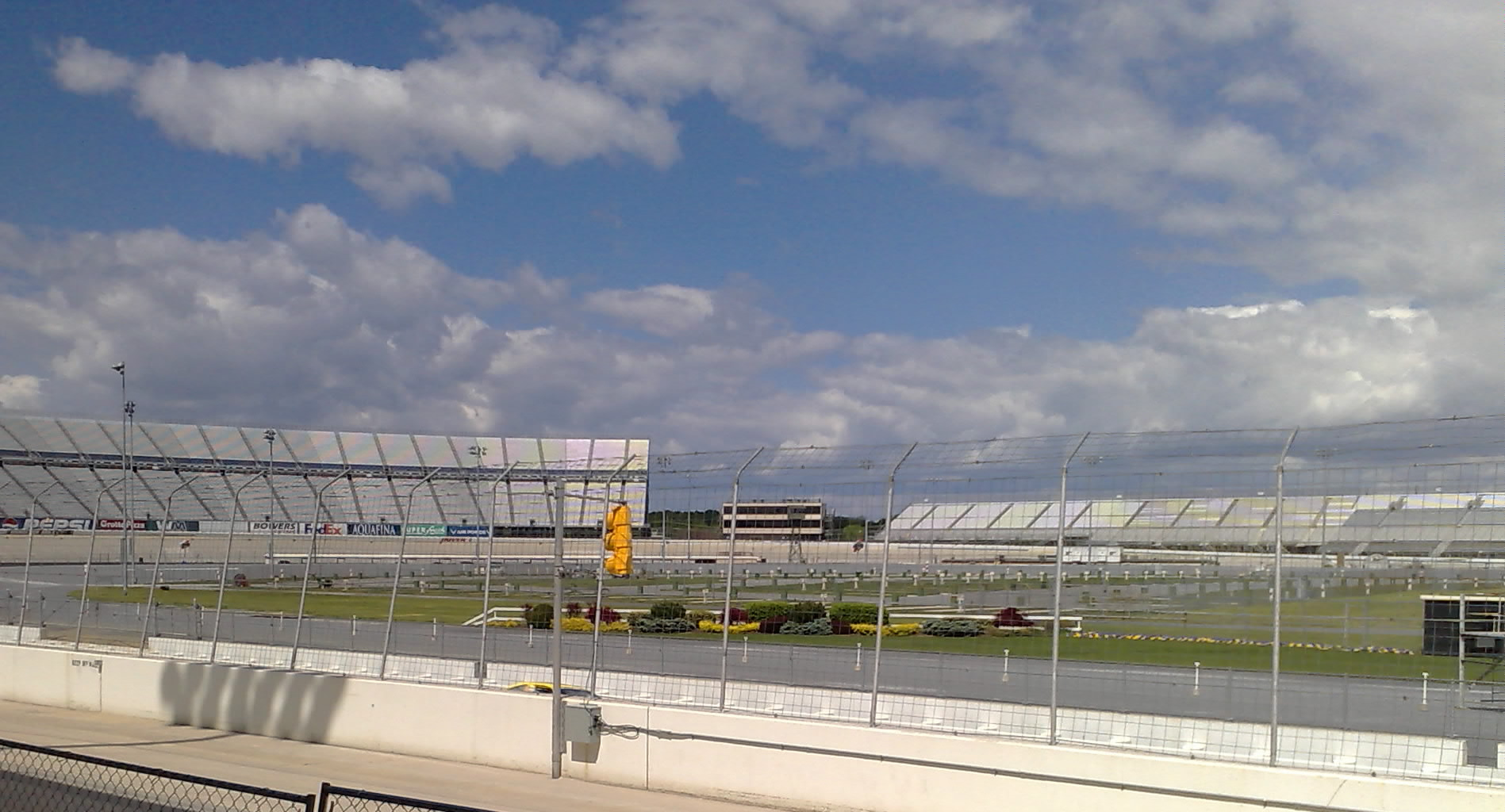
Dover Motor Speedway, the circuit where the race will be held.

Dover Motor Speedway is an oval race track in Dover, Delaware, United States that has held at least two NASCAR races since it opened in 1969. In addition to NASCAR, the track also hosted USAC and the NTT IndyCar Series. The track features one layout, a 1 mile (1.6 km) concrete oval, with 24° banking in the turns and 9° banking on the straights. The speedway is owned and operated by Speedway Motorsports.

The track, nicknamed "The Monster Mile", was built in 1969 by Melvin Joseph of Melvin L. Joseph Construction Company, Inc., with an asphalt surface, but was replaced with concrete in 1995. Six years later in 2001, the track's capacity moved to 135,000 seats, making the track have the largest capacity of sports venue in the mid-Atlantic. In 2002, the name changed to Dover International Speedway from Dover Downs International Speedway after Dover Downs Gaming and Entertainment split, making Dover Motorsports. From 2007 to 2009, the speedway worked on an improvement project called "The Monster Makeover", which expanded facilities at the track and beautified the track. After the 2014 season, the track's capacity was reduced to 95,500 seats.

==== Entry list ====
- (R) denotes rookie driver.

#	Driver	Team	Make	Sponsor
01	Tim Monroe	Fast Track Racing	Ford	Fast Track Racing
6	Lavar Scott (R)	Rev Racing	Chevrolet	Max Siegel Inc.
10	Ed Pompa	Fast Track Racing	Ford	HYTORC of New York / Double "H" Ranch
11	Zachary Tinkle	Fast Track Racing	Toyota	Racing for Rescues
12	C. J. McLaughlin	Fast Track Racing	Toyota	Sci Aps
15	Sean Hingorani (R)	Venturini Motorsports	Toyota	GearWrench
17	Landen Lewis	McGowan Motorsports	Toyota	American Resurfacing Inc.
18	William Sawalich (R)	Joe Gibbs Racing	Toyota	Starkey / SoundGear
20	Jake Finch	Venturini Motorsports	Toyota	Phoenix Construction
25	Conner Jones	Venturini Motorsports	Toyota	Jones Utilities
28	Luke Fenhaus (R)	Pinnacle Racing Group	Chevrolet	Chevrolet Performance
31	Rita Goulet (R)	Rise Motorsports	Chevrolet	Inspire Real Change
48	Brad Smith	Brad Smith Motorsports	Ford	Ski's Graphics
55	Toni Breidinger	Venturini Motorsports	Toyota	FP Movement
98	Dale Shearer	Shearer Speed Racing	Toyota	Shearer Speed Racing
Official entry list

== Starting lineup ==
Practice and qualifying were both scheduled to be held on Friday, April 26, but were both cancelled due to constant rain showers. The starting lineup would be determined by the ARCA rulebook. As a result, William Sawalich, driving for Joe Gibbs Racing, would start on the pole.

=== Starting lineup ===
Pos.	#	Driver	Team	Make
1	18	William Sawalich (R)	Joe Gibbs Racing	Toyota
2	11	Zachary Tinkle	Fast Track Racing	Toyota
3	01	Tim Monroe	Fast Track Racing	Ford
4	12	C. J. McLaughlin	Fast Track Racing	Toyota
5	48	Brad Smith	Brad Smith Motorsports	Ford
6	10	Ed Pompa	Fast Track Racing	Ford
7	15	Sean Hingorani (R)	Venturini Motorsports	Toyota
8	6	Lavar Scott (R)	Rev Racing	Chevrolet
9	20	Jake Finch	Venturini Motorsports	Toyota
10	25	Conner Jones	Venturini Motorsports	Toyota
11	55	Toni Breidinger	Venturini Motorsports	Toyota
12	17	Landen Lewis	McGowan Motorsports	Toyota
13	31	Rita Goulet (R)	Rise Motorsports	Chevrolet
14	28	Luke Fenhaus (R)	Pinnacle Racing Group	Chevrolet
15	98	Dale Shearer	Shearer Speed Racing	Toyota
Official starting lineup

== Race results ==
Fin	St	#	Driver	Team	Make	Laps	Led	Status	Pts
1	9	20	Jake Finch	Venturini Motorsports	Toyota	127	89	Running	48
2	12	17	Landen Lewis	McGowan Motorsports	Toyota	127	2	Running	43
3	14	28	Luke Fenhaus (R)	Pinnacle Racing Group	Chevrolet	127	0	Running	41
4	1	18	William Sawalich (R)	Joe Gibbs Racing	Toyota	127	2	Running	41
5	8	6	Lavar Scott (R)	Rev Racing	Chevrolet	127	4	Running	40
6	2	11	Zachary Tinkle	Fast Track Racing	Toyota	127	0	Running	38
7	11	55	Toni Breidinger	Venturini Motorsports	Toyota	125	0	Running	37
8	6	10	Ed Pompa	Fast Track Racing	Ford	119	0	Running	36
9	10	25	Conner Jones	Venturini Motorsports	Toyota	113	30	Accident	36
10	7	15	Sean Hingorani (R)	Venturini Motorsports	Toyota	85	0	Running	34
11	5	48	Brad Smith	Brad Smith Motorsports	Ford	70	0	Clutch	33
12	13	31	Rita Goulet (R)	Rise Motorsports	Chevrolet	29	0	Parked	32
13	4	12	C. J. McLaughlin	Fast Track Racing	Toyota	5	0	Mechanical	31
14	15	98	Dale Shearer	Shearer Speed Racing	Toyota	4	0	Mechanical	30
15	3	01	Tim Monroe	Fast Track Racing	Ford	2	0	Mechanical	29
Official race results

== Standings after the race ==
Drivers' Championship standings

	Pos	Driver	Points
	1	William Sawalich	90
1	2	Jake Finch	89 (-1)
1	3	Luke Fenhaus	83 (–7)
1	4	Lavar Scott	78 (–12)
2	5	Zachary Tinkle	75 (–15)
2	6	Sean Hingorani	74 (–16)
3	7	Ed Pompa	70 (–20)
3	8	Tim Monroe	62 (–28)
6	9	Rita Goulet	61 (–29)
4	10	Dale Shearer	60 (–30)

- Note: Only the first 10 positions are included for the driver standings.

Previous race: 2023 Pensacola 200	ARCA Menards Series East; 2023 season	Next race: 2023 Music City 200
