= Mitch Gibson =

American racing driver (born 1988)

- Born: April 7, 1988 (age 38); Coeburn, Virginia, U.S.

ARCA Menards Series career
- 1 race run over 1 year
- Best finish: 87th (2024)
- First race: 2024 General Tire 150 (Charlotte)
Wins	Top tens	Poles
0	0	0
- Statistics up to date as of March 21, 2024.

Mitch Gibson (born April 7, 1988) is an American professional stock car racing driver who last competed part-time in the ARCA Menards Series, driving the No. 31 Chevrolet for Rise Motorsports.

== Racing career ==
Gibson began his racing career in 2003, running at various stock car and dirt kart races at local race tracks. It was during this time that Gibson worked for Danny O'Quinn Jr.'s USAR Hooters Pro Cup Series team; Gibson went to the same high school with O'Quinn Jr. After O'Quinn Jr. went on to drive for Roush Racing in the NASCAR Busch Series, Gibson went on to work for Henderson Motorsports. Afterwards, he went on to work for Morgan–McClure Motorsports as a front tire changer for the No. 4 Chevrolet driven by Ward Burton before he was laid off along with twenty other crew members the following year. He has also worked as a tire specialist for ThorSport Racing. It was also during this time where he continued to race sporadically, winning the limited late model championship at Lonesome Pine Speedway in 2022.

In 2024, Gibson participated in pre-season testing for the ARCA Menards Series at Daytona International Speedway driving for Rise Motorsports in the No. 31 Chevrolet, and placed 64th in the overall results between the two testing days. It was also announced that Gibson would attempt to make his debut in the season opening race at Daytona with Rise. After placing 35th in the sole practice session, he ultimately failed to qualify for the race after setting the 47th quickest time in qualifying. Afterwards, it was announced that Gibson would run the No. 31 for Rise at Charlotte Motor Speedway. After placing 26th in the lone practice session, he started in 29th after not setting a time in qualifying and finished in 24th due to a crash late in the race. In September of that year, it was revealed that he would drive for Wayne Peterson Racing in the No. 06 Toyota at Bristol Motor Speedway, but was replaced by Nate Moeller after suffering a crash in qualifying.

== Personal life ==
Gibson currently resides in Weyers Cave, Virginia, and has three children. Outside of racing, he also works as an EHS manager for the Kerry Group.

== Motorsports career results ==
=== ARCA Menards Series ===
(key) (Bold – Pole position awarded by qualifying time. Italics – Pole position earned by points standings or practice time. * – Most laps led. ** – All laps led.)

ARCA Menards Series results
Year	Team	No.	Make	1	2	3	4	5	6	7	8	9	10	11	12	13	14	15	16	17	18	19	20	AMSC	Pts	Ref
2024	Rise Motorsports	31	Chevy	DAY; DNQ	PHO	TAL	DOV	KAN	CLT; 24	IOW	MOH	BLN	IRP	SLM	ELK	MCH	ISF	MLW	DSF	GLN				87th	33	
2024	Wayne Peterson Racing	0	Toyota																		BRI; 34	KAN	TOL	87th	33	
^{†} – Qualified but replaced by Nate Moeller.

==== ARCA Menards Series East ====
ARCA Menards Series East results
Year	Team	No.	Make	1	2	3	4	5	6	7	8	AMSEC	Pts	Ref
2024	Wayne Peterson Racing	0	Toyota	FIF	DOV	NSV	FRS	IOW	IRP	MLW	BRI; 34	62nd	10	
