= 2021 Southern Illinois 100 =

2021 Southern Illinois 100 presented by Lucas Oil
Race details
- Race 17 of 20 of the 2021 ARCA Menards Series
- Date: September 5, 2021
- Official name: 35th Annual Southern Illinois 100
- Location: Du Quoin, Illinois, DuQuoin State Fairgrounds Racetrack
- Course: Permanent racing facility
- Course length: 1.6 km (1 miles)
- Distance: 104 laps, 100 mi (160 km)
- Scheduled distance: 100 laps, 100 mi (160 km)
- Average speed: 24.527 miles per hour (39.472 km/h)

Pole position
Driver	Landen Lewis	Rette Jones Racing with Austin Theriault
- Time: 34.236

Most laps led
Driver	Landen Lewis	Rette Jones Racing with Austin Theriault
- Laps: 104

Winner
No. 2	Landen Lewis	Rette Jones Racing with Austin Theriault

Television in the United States
- Network: MAVTV
- Announcers: Bob Dillner, Jim Trebow

Radio in the United States
- Radio: ARCA Racing Network

The 2021 Southern Illinois 100 presented by Lucas Oil was the 17th stock car race of the 2021 ARCA Menards Series season, and the 35th iteration of the event. The race was held on Sunday, September 5, in Du Quoin, Illinois at the DuQuoin State Fairgrounds Racetrack, a 1 mile (1.6 km) permanent clay oval-shaped track at the DuQuoin State Fair. The race took 104 laps to complete due to an overtime finish. At race's end, Landen Lewis of Rette Jones Racing would dominate the race, leading every lap en route to his first career ARCA Menards Series win. To fill out the podium, Ty Gibbs of Joe Gibbs Racing and Ken Schrader of Fast Track Racing would finish second and third respectively.

== Background ==
The DuQuoin State Fair was founded in 1923 by local businessman William R. "W.R." Hayes, who owned the fair and ran it. (It did not become run by the state of Illinois as a true "state fair" until the 1980s; it is now officially called the Illinois State Fair in DuQuoin, as opposed to the longtime one at state capital Springfield.) At the start Hayes had a half-mile harness-racing track on his 30-acre site, with wooden grandstands that seated 3000. In 1939 Hayes started buying adjoining stripmined land to develop its potential as parkland, replanting it and turning the strip pits into family-friendly ponds and lakes. He eventually expanded his little fairgrounds into 1200 acres.

The DuQuoin "Magic Mile" racetrack was constructed on reclaimed stripmine land in 1946 by W.R. Hayes. The track's first national championship race was held in September 1948. In the second race on October 10, popular AAA National driving champion Ted Horn was killed in the fourth turn when a spindle on his championship car broke. The national championship race for the USAC Silver Crown dirt cars is held in his honor.

=== Entry list ===
#	Driver	Team	Make	Sponsor
01	Tim Monroe	Fast Track Racing	Chevrolet	Carolina Sim Works
2	Landen Lewis	Rette Jones Racing with Austin Theriault	Toyota	19th Green
06	Wayne Peterson	Wayne Peterson Racing	Chevrolet	Great Railing
10	Ken Schrader	Fast Track Racing	Toyota	Kuttawa Fire Department
11	Owen Smith	Fast Track Racing	Ford	Pedalin Pup
12	D. L. Wilson	Fast Track Racing	Toyota	Fast Track Racing
15	Jesse Love	Venturini Motorsports	Toyota	Mobil 1
16	Kelly Kovski	Roy Kovski Racing	Chevrolet	Schluckebeier Farms, Schnapp Sewer Service
18	Ty Gibbs	Joe Gibbs Racing	Toyota	Joe Gibbs Racing
20	Corey Heim	Venturini Motorsports	Toyota	Craftsman
24	Ryan Unzicker	Hendren Motorsports	Chevrolet	Hummingbird Winery, RJR Transportation
25	Toni Breidinger	Venturini Motorsports	Toyota	Venturini Motorsports
27	Zachary Tinkle	Richmond Clubb Motorsports	Toyota	Latino Immigration & Legal Center
46	Taylor Gray	David Gilliland Racing	Ford	David Gilliland Racing
48	Brad Smith	Brad Smith Motorsports	Chevrolet	Henshaw Custom Automation
69	Will Kimmel	Kimmel Racing	Ford	Clarksville Schwinn
Official entry list

== Practice ==
The only 45-minute practice session was held on Sunday, September 5, at 4:15 PM CST. Jesse Love of Venturini Motorsports would set the fastest lap in the session, with a lap of 36.037 and an average speed of 99.897 miles per hour (160.769 km/h).

Pos.	#	Driver	Team	Make	Time	Speed
1	15	Jesse Love	Venturini Motorsports	Toyota	36.037	99.897
2	16	Kelly Kovski	Roy Kovski Racing	Chevrolet	36.281	99.225
3	24	Ryan Unzicker	Hendren Motorsports	Chevrolet	36.545	98.509
Full practice results

== Qualifying ==
Qualifying would take place on Sunday, September 5, at 6:00 PM CST. Each driver would have one lap to set a time. Landen Lewis of Rette Jones Racing would win the pole for the race, setting a lap of 34.236 and an average speed of 105.152 miles per hour (169.226 km/h).

No drivers would fail to qualify. Jesse Love and Kelly Kovski did not make a qualifying lap, and had to start the race from the rear.

Pos.	#	Driver	Team	Make	Time	Speed
1	2	Landen Lewis	Rette Jones Racing with Austin Theriault	Toyota	34.236	105.152
2	24	Ryan Unzicker	Hendren Motorsports	Chevrolet	34.349	104.807
3	20	Corey Heim	Venturini Motorsports	Toyota	35.596	101.135
4	18	Ty Gibbs	Joe Gibbs Racing	Toyota	35.634	101.027
5	10	Ken Schrader	Fast Track Racing	Toyota	35.940	100.167
6	69	Will Kimmel	Kimmel Racing	Ford	36.033	99.908
7	46	Taylor Gray	David Gilliland Racing	Ford	36.189	99.478
8	25	Toni Breidinger	Venturini Motorsports	Toyota	38.214	94.206
9	12	D. L. Wilson	Fast Track Racing	Toyota	38.827	92.719
10	27	Zachary Tinkle	Richmond Clubb Motorsports	Toyota	39.638	90.822
11	01	Tim Monroe	Fast Track Racing	Chevrolet	39.685	90.714
12	11	Owen Smith	Fast Track Racing	Ford	41.269	87.233
13	48	Brad Smith	Brad Smith Motorsports	Chevrolet	44.157	81.527
14	06	Wayne Peterson	Wayne Peterson Racing	Chevrolet	58.780	61.245
15	15	Jesse Love	Venturini Motorsports	Toyota	-	-
16	16	Kelly Kovski	Roy Kovski Racing	Chevrolet	-	-
Official qualifying results

== Race results ==
Fin	St	#	Driver	Team	Make	Laps	Led	Status	Pts
1	1	2	Landen Lewis	Rette Jones Racing with Austin Theriault	Toyota	104	104	running	49
2	4	18	Ty Gibbs	Joe Gibbs Racing	Toyota	104	0	running	42
3	5	10	Ken Schrader	Fast Track Racing	Toyota	104	0	running	41
4	2	24	Ryan Unzicker	Hendren Motorsports	Chevrolet	104	0	running	40
5	7	46	Taylor Gray	David Gilliland Racing	Ford	103	0	running	39
6	11	01	Tim Monroe	Fast Track Racing	Chevrolet	102	0	running	38
7	3	20	Corey Heim	Venturini Motorsports	Toyota	95	0	overheating	37
8	10	27	Zachary Tinkle	Richmond Clubb Motorsports	Toyota	76	0	overheating	36
9	6	69	Will Kimmel	Kimmel Racing	Ford	57	0	overheating	35
10	15	15	Jesse Love	Venturini Motorsports	Toyota	54	0	overheating	34
11	9	12	D. L. Wilson	Fast Track Racing	Toyota	38	0	suspension	33
12	8	25	Toni Breidinger	Venturini Motorsports	Toyota	35	0	oil leak	32
13	12	11	Owen Smith	Fast Track Racing	Ford	9	0	overheating	31
14	13	48	Brad Smith	Brad Smith Motorsports	Chevrolet	7	0	brakes	30
15	14	06	Wayne Peterson	Wayne Peterson Racing	Chevrolet	0	0	transmission	29
16	16	16	Kelly Kovski	Roy Kovski Racing	Chevrolet	0	0	did not start	0

Previous race: 2021 Sprecher 150	ARCA Menards Series; 2021 season	Next race: 2021 Bush's Beans 200
