= Landen Lewis =

American racing driver (born 2006)

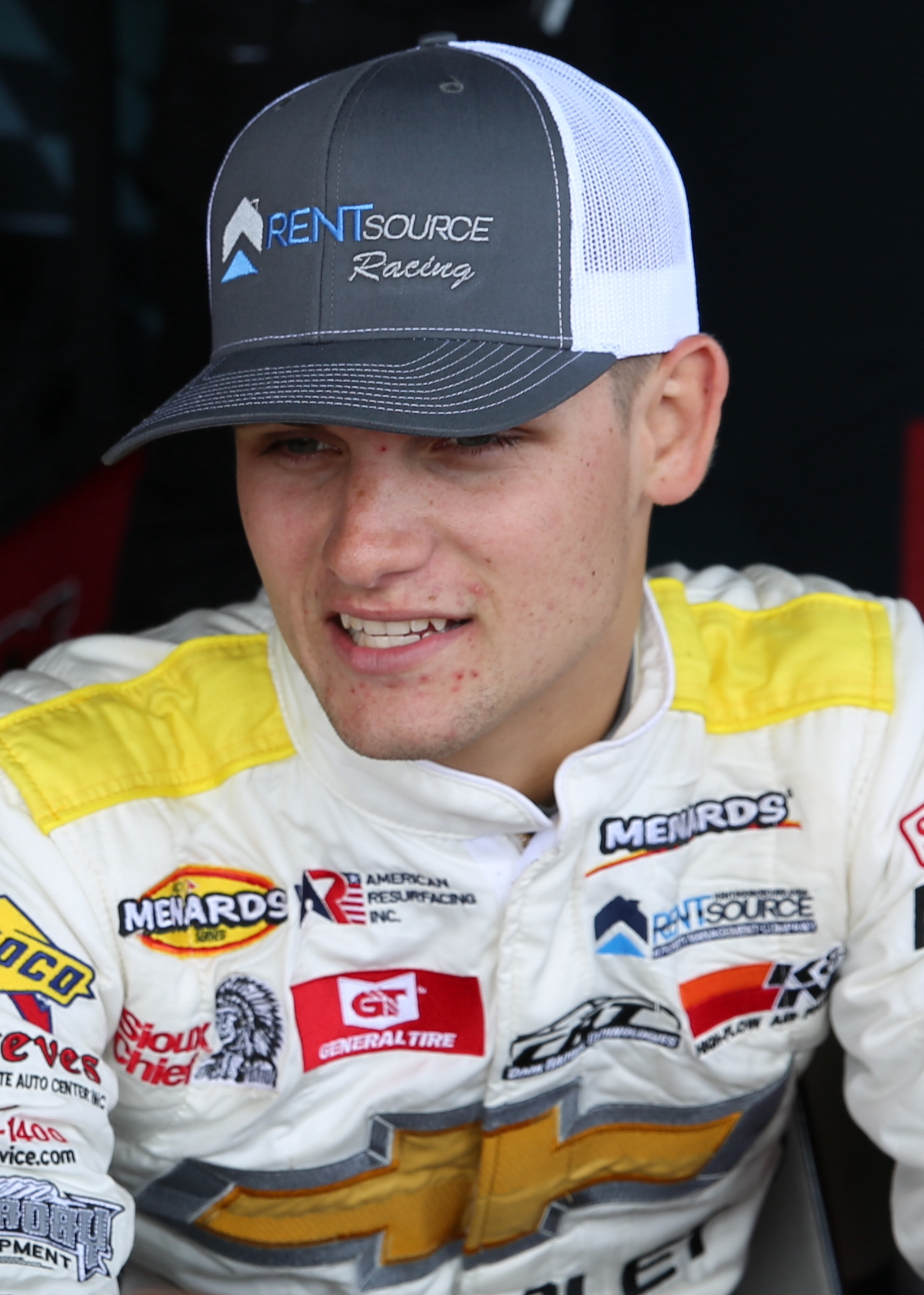
- Lewis at Sonoma Raceway in 2023
- Born: Landen River Lewis; February 26, 2006 (age 20); Ocean Isle Beach, North Carolina, U.S.
- Achievements: 2025 CARS Late Model Stock Tour Champion

NASCAR FedEx Freight Truck Series career
- 18 races run over 3 years
- 2026 position: 19th
- Best finish: 19th (2026)
- First race: 2023 O'Reilly Auto Parts 150 at Mid-Ohio (Mid-Ohio)
- Last race: 2026 Craftsman 200 (Homestead)
Wins	Top tens	Poles
0	6	0

ARCA Menards Series career
- 6 races run over 3 years
- Best finish: 32nd (2021)
- First race: 2021 Allen Crowe 100 (Springfield)
- Last race: 2024 Bush's Beans 200 (Bristol)
- First win: 2021 Southern Illinois 100 (DuQuoin)
Wins	Top tens	Poles
1	4	1

ARCA Menards Series East career
- 3 races run over 2 years
- Best finish: 26th (2023)
- First race: 2023 General Tire 125 (Dover)
- Last race: 2024 Bush's Beans 200 (Bristol)
Wins	Top tens	Poles
0	2	0

ARCA Menards Series West career
- 17 races run over 2 years
- Best finish: 8th (2022)
- First race: 2022 Salute to the Oil Industry NAPA Auto Parts 150 (Kern County)
- Last race: 2023 Desert Diamond Casino West Valley 100 (Phoenix)
- First win: 2022 Salute to the Oil Industry NAPA Auto Parts 150 (Kern County)
- Last win: 2023 Portland 112 (Portland)
Wins	Top tens	Poles
2	14	2
- Statistics up to date as of November 6, 2026.

Landen River Lewis (born February 26, 2006) is an American professional stock car racing driver. He last competed part-time in the NASCAR Craftsman Truck Series, driving the No. 45 Chevrolet Silverado RST for Niece Motorsports. He has previously competed in the ARCA Menards Series.

Lewis is the 2025 CARS Late Model Stock Car Tour champion.

== Racing career ==
=== Early career ===
==== Go-karts ====
Lewis started his career in go-karts at the age of four, and from 2010 to 2018, he picked up 150 wins, a Maxx Nationals win, four Maxx Jr Daddy championships, as well as four Maxx Daddy championships.

==== Dirt Modifieds ====
In 2018, Lewis started racing Dirt Modifieds, picking up six wins, eight poles, fifteen top-fives, and 26 top-tens, and the Most Popular Driver Award for the Mid-East Dirt Modified Series.

==== Legend cars ====
In 2019, Lewis joined Joe Ryan Cars in Legend Cars and won the Winter Nationals in only his second ever start. He would remain with the team to present day, picking up fifteen wins in 2020 along with a Dirt Nationals championship, picking up the Dirt Nationals, Asphalt Nationals, Winter Nationals, Road Course World Finals championships as well as the North Carolina State Championship in 2021, and in 2022 picking up the Road Course National Championship and the Summer Shootout, Road Course World Finals, and Winter Nationals titles for the Pro Division.

=== ARCA Menards Series ===
==== 2021 ====
Lewis made his ARCA Menards Series debut in 2021, running three races. He debuted in the Allen Crowe 100 at the Illinois State Fairgrounds Racetrack driving for Rette Jones Racing in collaboration with Rev Racing and Austin Theriault, finishing seventh. In his second career start, in the Southern Illinois 100 at the DuQuoin State Fairgrounds Racetrack, Lewis won the pole. He dominated the race, leading all 104 laps en route to his first career victory. He ran one more race, the Sioux Chief PowerPEX 200 at Salem Speedway, finishing thirteenth.

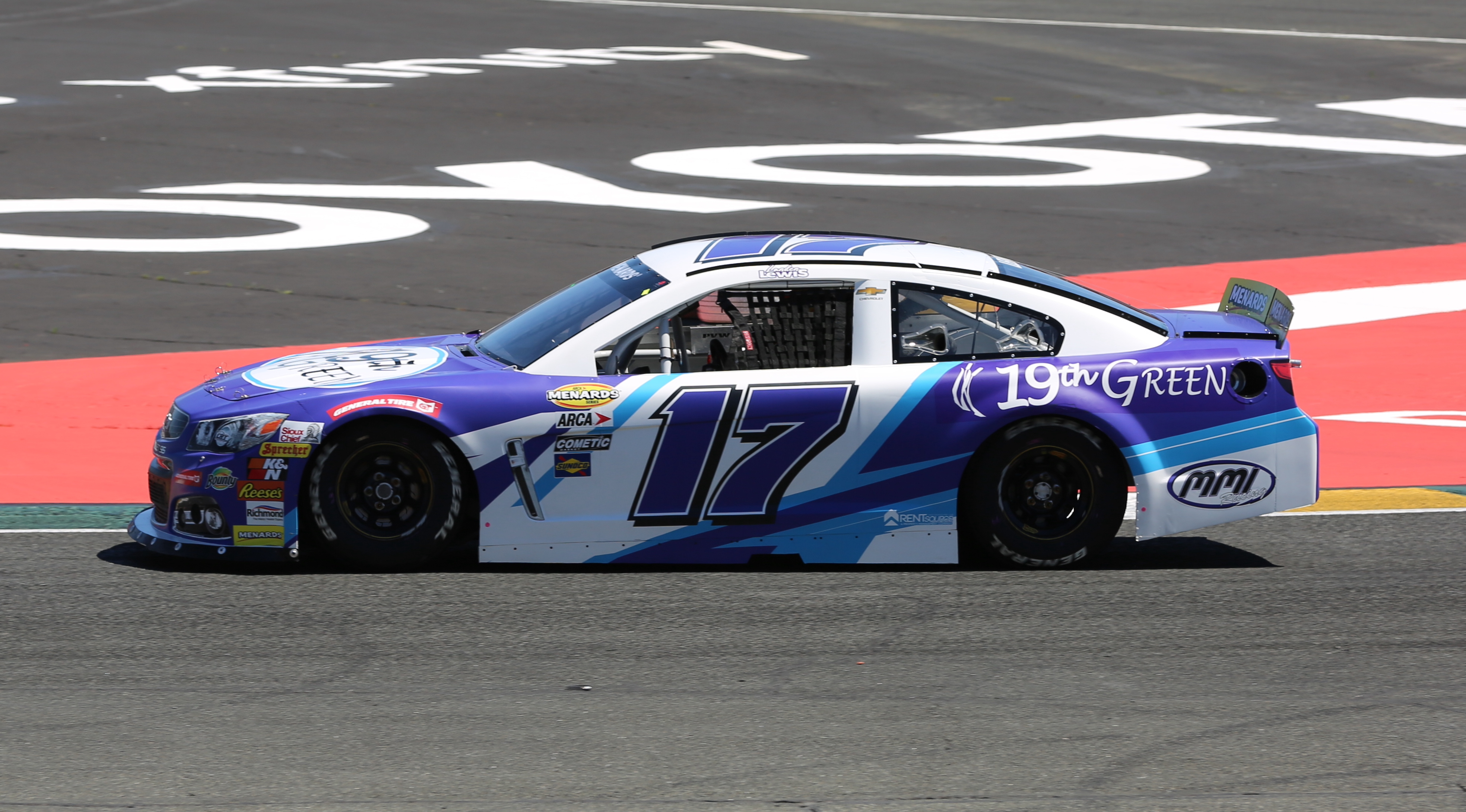
Lewis in the ARCA Menards Series West race at Sonoma in 2022.

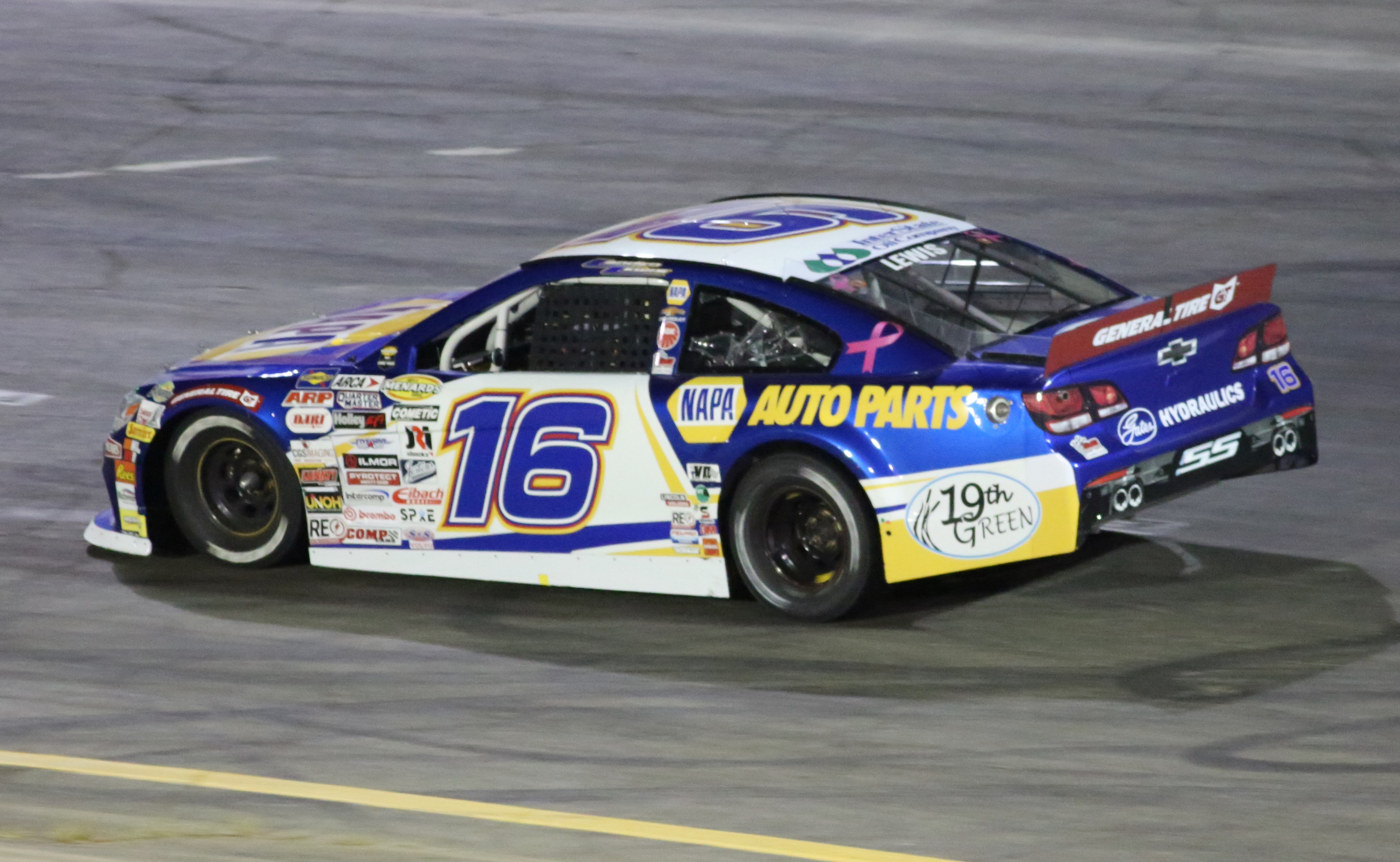
Lewis in the ARCA Menards Series West race at All American Speedway in 2022.

==== 2022 ====
Lewis would make eight starts in the ARCA Menards Series West in 2022 across the No. 42 car for Cook Racing Technologies, No. 17 car for McGowan Motorsports, and the No. 16 car for McAnally–Hilgemann Racing. He would pick up one win of the year in his first start of the season at Kern County.

==== 2023 ====
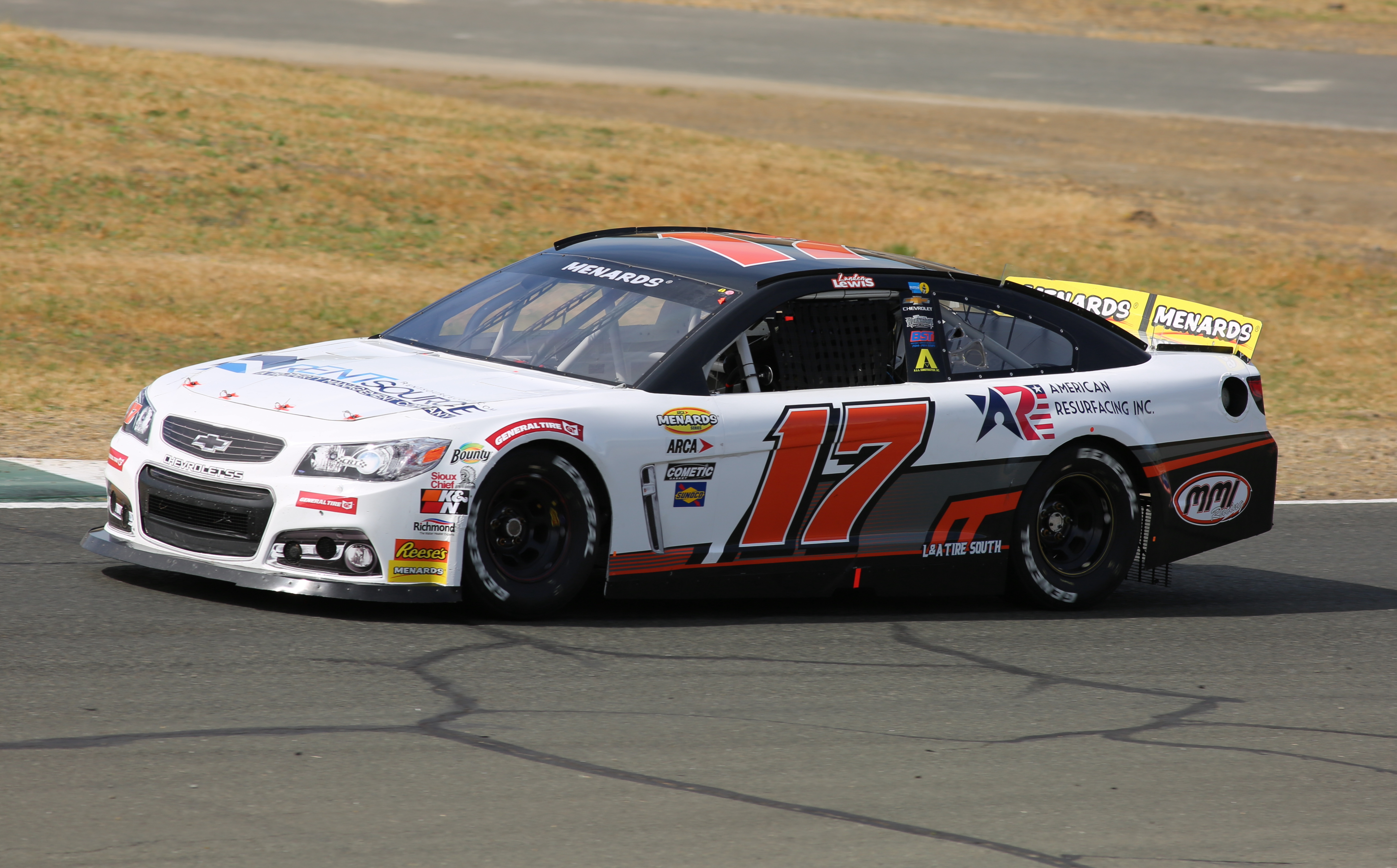
Lewis in the ARCA Menards Series West race at Sonoma in 2023.

In 2023, Lewis would make a full-time run at the ARCA Menards Series West championship in the No. 17 for McGowan Motorsports. He would start his season by finishing second in the first three races and then winning the next race at Portland fending off NASCAR Xfinity Series regular Cole Custer.

=== ARCA Menards Series West ===
Lewis made his ARCA Menards Series West debut in 2022 in the Salute to the Oil Industry NAPA Auto Parts 150 at Kern County Raceway Park driving the No. 42 Chevrolet for Cook Racing Technologies. Lewis took the lead late in the race and collected his first career ARCA Menards Series West victory in his first ever start. He would run the race at Sonoma Raceway for McGowan Motorsports before replacing Austin Herzog in the No. 16 for Bill McAnally Racing for the final six races of the year.

=== ARCA Menards Series East ===
Lewis made his ARCA Menards Series East debut in 2023 in the General Tire 125 at Dover Motor Speedway driving the No. 17 Toyota for McGowan Motorsports. He would go on to finish second behind race winner Jake Finch.

Lewis returned to CR7 Motorsports in 2024 to run the combination race for the main ARCA Series and the East Series at Bristol. He would finish second in the race. It would be his only ARCA start that year.

=== NASCAR Craftsman Truck Series ===
On June 24, 2023, Lewis posted on social media a picture of the No. 04 Roper Racing truck with his name above the window net, indicating that he would make his debut in the series for the team at some point during the season. He ran races for the team at Mid-Ohio and IRP.

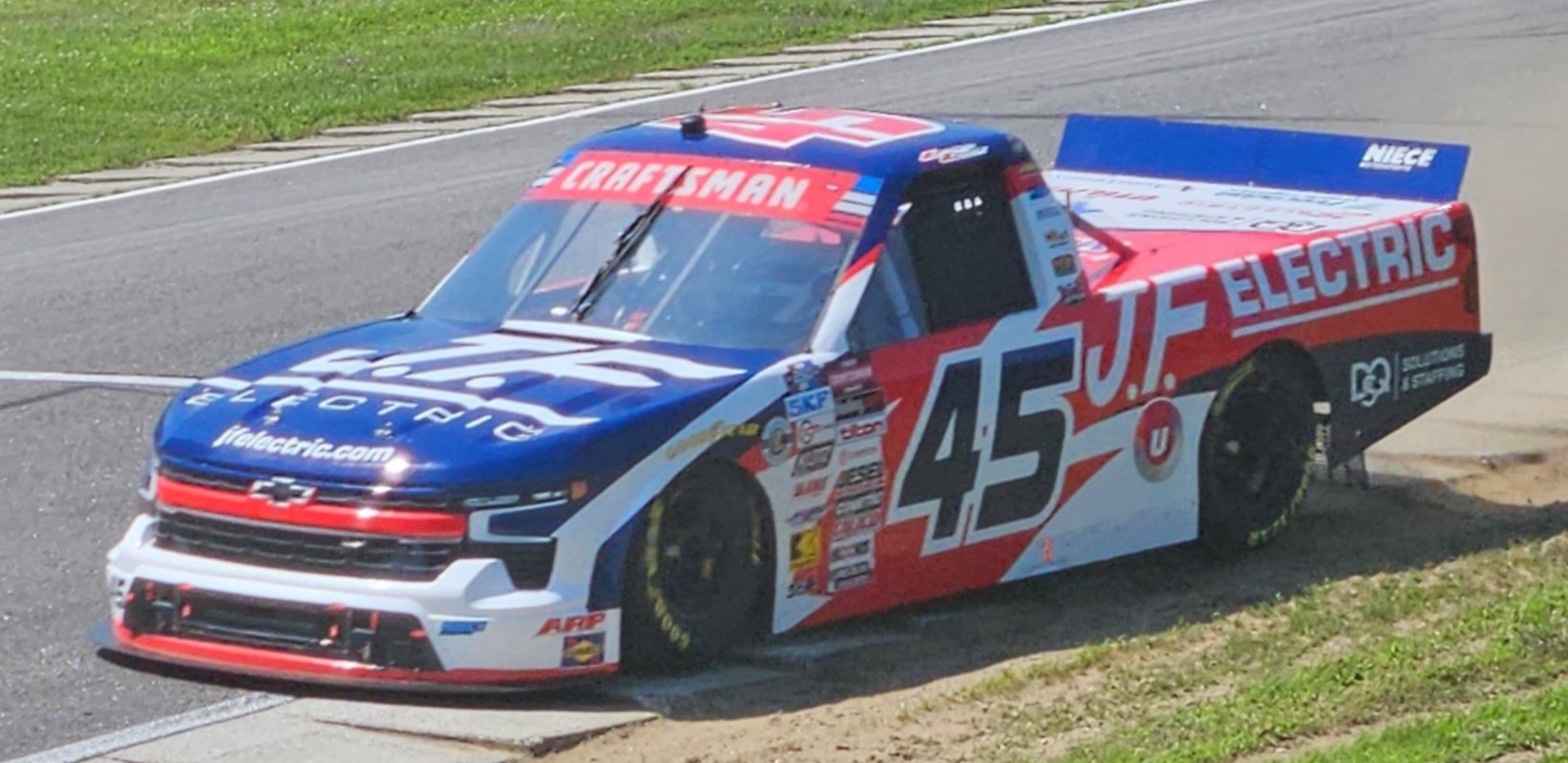
Lewis' No. 45 truck at Lime Rock Park in 2026.

On October 31, 2024, Hattori Racing Enterprises announced that Lewis would drive their No. 16 truck in the fall race at Martinsville as a last-minute replacement for Johnny Sauter, who moved to the ThorSport Racing No. 66 truck to replace Conner Jones who was suspended for the race after intentionally wrecking Matt Mills' truck in the previous race at Homestead-Miami Speedway.

On October 23, 2025, it was announced that Lewis will drive for Niece Motorsports part-time in the 2026 season.

== Motorsports career results ==
=== Racing career summary ===
Season	Series	Team	Races	Wins	Top 5	Top 10	Points	Position
2021	ARCA Menards Series	Rette Jones Racing	3	1	1	1	117	32nd
2022	ARCA Menards Series West	Cook Racing Technologies	1	1	1	1	398	8th
2022	ARCA Menards Series West	McGowan Motorsports	1	0	0	0	398	8th
2022	ARCA Menards Series West	Bill McAnally Racing	6	0	2	5	398	8th
2023	ARCA Menards Series West	McGowan Motorsports	8	1	6	7	409	11th
2023	ARCA Menards Series West	CR7 Motorsports	1	0	0	1	409	11th
2023	ARCA Menards Series East	McGowan Motorsports	1	0	1	1	68	25th
2023	ARCA Menards Series East	CR7 Motorsports	1	0	0	0	68	25th
2023	ARCA Menards Series	McGowan Motorsports	1	0	1	1	68	59th
2023	ARCA Menards Series	CR7 Motorsports	1	0	0	0	68	59th
2023	NASCAR Craftsman Truck Series	Roper Racing	2	0	0	0	22	58th
2024	CARS Late Model Stock Car Tour	Kevin Harvick Incorporated	10	1	1	3	196	17th
2024	ARCA Menards Series East	CR7 Motorsports	1	0	1	1	43	36th
2024	ARCA Menards Series	CR7 Motorsports	1	0	1	1	43	74th
2024	NASCAR Craftsman Truck Series	Hattori Racing Enterprises	1	0	0	0	2	76th
2025	CARS Late Model Stock Car Tour	Kevin Harvick Incorporated	15	4	7	11	546	**1st**
2026	CARS Late Model Stock Car Tour	Kevin Harvick Incorporated	8	1	6	6	271	14th
2026	NASCAR Craftsman Truck Series	Niece Motorsports	15	0	3	5	375	19th

=== NASCAR ===
(key) (Bold – Pole position awarded by qualifying time. Italics – Pole position earned by points standings or practice time. * – Most laps led.)

==== Craftsman Truck Series ====
NASCAR Craftsman Truck Series results
Year	Team	No.	Make	1	2	3	4	5	6	7	8	9	10	11	12	13	14	15	16	17	18	19	20	21	22	23	24	25	NCTC	Pts	Ref
2023	Roper Racing	04	Chevy	DAY	LVS	ATL	COA	TEX	BRD	MAR	KAN	DAR	NWS	CLT	GTW	NSH	MOH; 24	POC	RCH	IRP; 28	MLW	KAN	BRI	TAL	HOM	PHO			58th	22	
2024	Hattori Racing Enterprises	16	Toyota	DAY	ATL	LVS	BRI	COA	MAR	TEX	KAN	DAR	NWS	CLT	GTW	NSH	POC	IRP	RCH	MLW	BRI	KAN	TAL	HOM	MAR; 35	PHO			76th	2	
2026	Niece Motorsports	45	Chevy	DAY	ATL	STP; 6	DAR	CAR; 14	BRI	TEX	GLN	DOV	CLT	NSH	MCH	COR; 4	LRP; 2	NWS; 5	IRP; 35	RCH; 14	NHA; 32	BRI; 14	KAN; 34	CLT; 7	PHO; 16	TAL; 6	MAR; 19	HOM; 14	19th	375	

^{*} Season still in progress
^{1} Ineligible for series points

=== ARCA Menards Series ===
(key) (Bold – Pole position awarded by qualifying time. Italics – Pole position earned by points standings or practice time. * – Most laps led. ** – All laps led.)

ARCA Menards Series results
Year	Team	No.	Make	1	2	3	4	5	6	7	8	9	10	11	12	13	14	15	16	17	18	19	20	AMSC	Pts	Ref
2021	Rette Jones Racing with Austin Theriault	2	Toyota	DAY	PHO	TAL	KAN	TOL	CLT	MOH	POC	ELK	BLN	IOW	WIN	GLN	MCH	ISF; 7	MLW	**DSF**; 1**	BRI			32nd	117	
2021	Rette Jones Racing	30	Ford																			SLM; 13	KAN	32nd	117	
2023	McGowan Motorsports	17	Toyota	DAY	PHO; 2	TAL	KAN	CLT	BLN	ELK	MOH	IOW	POC	MCH	IRP	GLN	ISF	MLW	DSF	KAN				59th	68	
2023	CR7 Motorsports	97	Chevy																		BRI; 20	SLM	TOL	59th	68	
2024	CR7 Motorsports	97	Chevy	DAY	PHO	TAL	DOV	KAN	CLT	IOW	MOH	BLN	IRP	SLM	ELK	MCH	ISF	MLW	DSF	GLN	BRI; 2	KAN	TOL	74th	43	

==== ARCA Menards Series East ====
ARCA Menards Series East results
Year	Team	No.	Make	1	2	3	4	5	6	7	8	AMSEC	Pts	Ref
2023	McGowan Motorsports	17	Toyota	FIF	DOV; 2	NSV	FRS	IOW	IRP	MLW		26th	68	
2023	CR7 Motorsports	97	Chevy								BRI; 20	26th	68	
2024	CR7 Motorsports	97	Chevy	FIF	DOV	NSV	FRS	IOW	IRP	MLW	BRI; 2	36th	43	

==== ARCA Menards Series West ====
ARCA Menards Series West results
Year	Team	No.	Make	1	2	3	4	5	6	7	8	9	10	11	12	AMSWC	Pts	Ref
2022	Cook Racing Technologies	42	Toyota	PHO	IRW	KCR; 1	PIR									8th	398	
2022	McGowan Motorsports	17	Chevy					SON; 14								8th	398	
2022	Bill McAnally Racing	16	Chevy						IRW; 5	EVG; 6	PIR; 9	AAS; 17	LVS; 3	PHO; 6		8th	398	
2023	McGowan Motorsports	17	Toyota	PHO; 2	IRW; 2											11th	409	
2023	McGowan Motorsports	17	Chevy			**KCR**; 2*	**PIR**; 1	SON; 19	IRW; 9	SHA; 4	EVG; 4	AAS	LVS	MAD		11th	409	
2023	CR7 Motorsports	97	Chevy												PHO; 6	11th	409	

=== CARS Late Model Stock Car Tour ===
(key) (Bold – Pole position awarded by qualifying time. Italics – Pole position earned by points standings or practice time. * – Most laps led. ** – All laps led.)

CARS Late Model Stock Car Tour results
Year	Team	No.	Make	1	2	3	4	5	6	7	8	9	10	11	12	13	14	15	16	17	CLMSCTC	Pts	Ref
2024	Kevin Harvick Incorporated	62	Toyota	SNM	HCY; 13	AAS; 8	OCS	ACE; 18	TCM; 29	LGY; 22	DOM; 8	CRW	HCY	NWS	ACE; 11	WCS; 1					17th	196	
2024	Kevin Harvick Incorporated	62L	Toyota														FLC; 14	SBO; 16	TCM	NWS	17th	196	
2025	Kevin Harvick Incorporated	29	Chevy	AAS; 11	WCS; 5	CDL; 4	OCS; 9	ACE; 1*	**NWS**; 1**	LGY; 19*	DOM; 10	CRW; 13		AND; 1	FLC; 1*	SBO; 4*	TCM; 9	NWS; 7			1st	546	
2025	Kevin Harvick Incorporated	97	Chevy										HCY; 20								1st	546	
2026	Kevin Harvick Incorporated	29	Chevy	SNM	WCS; 4	NSV; 5	**CRW**; 1	ACE; 4	LGY; 2	DOM; 22	NWS; 31	HCY; 3	AND	FLC	TCM	NPS	SBO				14th	271	
