= Tyler Carpenter =

American racing driver (born 1991)

- Born: Tyler Eugene Carpenter; January 3, 1991 (age 35); Parkersburg, West Virginia, U.S.
- Achievements: 2019, 2021 Gateway Dirt Nationals Winner

NASCAR FedEx Freight Truck Series career
- 2 races run over 2 years
- 2023 position: 73rd
- Best finish: 73rd (2023)
- First race: 2022 Clean Harbors 150 (Knoxville)
- Last race: 2023 Weather Guard Truck Race on Dirt (Bristol Dirt)
Wins	Top tens	Poles
0	0	0
- Statistics up to date as of April 3, 2026.

Tyler Eugene Carpenter (born January 3, 1991) is an American professional stock car racing and dirt track racing driver. He last competed part-time in the NASCAR Craftsman Truck Series, driving the No. 41 Chevrolet Silverado for Niece Motorsports. He currently competes full-time in Dirt Super Late Model’s driving the No. 28 Kryptonite Racecars Chassis for Kryptonite Racecars.

== Racing career ==
=== Dirt late models ===
In 2019, Carpenter would win the 2019 Gateway Dirt Nationals.

In 2021, Carpenter would race in the 2021 Gateway Dirt Nationals. After moving through the preliminary heats, Carpenter would complete a flag-to-flag performance to win the event. However, some drivers, most notably fellow drivers Ricky Thornton Jr. and Brandon Sheppard would criticize Carpenter for his driving style, saying that Carpenter had little respect for others on track. In response, Carpenter said "It’s either make the move or be moved. I don’t want to crash them guys. Hell, I like ‘em all. We’re here to race… they’ve had their opportunity to win big races. This is the only shot I got as of right now. I ain’t got the backing they got."

=== NASCAR Craftsman Truck Series ===
As a result of winning the 2021 Gateway Dirt Nationals, Carpenter got an opportunity to participate in a one-off race for Niece Motorsports at Knoxville Raceway as part of the team's "Win and You're In" program. Carpenter would go on to finish 36th after a driveshaft issue. He would later participate in the 2023 Bristol Motor Speedway Weather Guard Truck Race for Niece as well, finishing 29th after an accident.

== Personal life ==
Carpenter is a Parkersburg, West Virginia native. According to Carpenter, his father, "Fast" Freddie, is reported to have sparked his interest in racing, saying "Growing up as a kid, I watched him and one thing [eventually] led to another. He got his boys involved which [included] me and my brother."

== Motorsports career results ==
=== NASCAR ===
(key) (Bold – Pole position awarded by qualifying time. Italics – Pole position earned by points standings or practice time. * – Most laps led.)

==== Craftsman Truck Series ====
NASCAR Craftsman Truck Series results
Year	Team	No.	Make	1	2	3	4	5	6	7	8	9	10	11	12	13	14	15	16	17	18	19	20	21	22	23	NCTC	Pts	Ref
2022	Niece Motorsports	41	Chevy	DAY	LVS	ATL	COA	MAR	BRD	DAR	KAN	TEX	CLT	GTW	SON	KNX; 36	NSH	MOH	POC	IRP	RCH	KAN	BRI	TAL	HOM	PHO	84th	1	
2023	Niece Motorsports	41	Chevy	DAY	LVS	ATL	COA	TEX	BRD; 29	MAR	KAN	DAR	NWS	CLT	GTW	NSH	MOH	POC	RCH	IRP	MLW	KAN	BRI	TAL	HOM	PHO	73rd	8	

^{*} Season in progress
^{1} Ineligible for series points
