= Chase Janes =

American racing driver

- Born: March 2, 2001 (age 25); Fort Wayne, Indiana, U.S.

NASCAR FedEx Freight Truck Series career
- 4 races run over 2 years
- 2023 position: 60th
- Best finish: 60th (2023)
- First race: 2022 Blue-Emu Maximum Pain Relief 200 (Martinsville)
- Last race: 2023 Kansas Lottery 200 (Kansas)
Wins	Top tens	Poles
0	0	0
- Statistics up to date as of November 5, 2023.

Chase M. Janes (born March 2, 2001) is an American professional racing driver. He last competed part-time in the NASCAR Craftsman Truck Series driving the No. 33 Ford F-150 for Reaume Brothers Racing.

== Racing career ==
=== Camping World Truck Series ===
Janes made his NASCAR Camping World Truck Series debut in 2022 at the Martinsville Speedway running the No. 33 Toyota Tundra for Reaume Brothers Racing. On June 15, 2022, G2G Racing owner Tim Viens revealed that Janes would drive for his team in the race at Nashville in the No. 46 truck.

== Motorsports career results ==
=== NASCAR ===
(key) (Bold – Pole position awarded by qualifying time. Italics – Pole position earned by points standings or practice time. * – Most laps led.)

==== Craftsman Truck Series ====
NASCAR Craftsman Truck Series results
Year	Team	No.	Make	1	2	3	4	5	6	7	8	9	10	11	12	13	14	15	16	17	18	19	20	21	22	23	NCTS	Pts	Ref
2022	Reaume Brothers Racing	33	Chevy	DAY	LVS	ATL	COA	MAR; 25	BRI	DAR	KAN	TEX	CLT	GTW	SON	KNX											62nd	13	
2022	G2G Racing	46	Toyota														NSH; 36	MOH	POC	IRP	RCH	KAN	BRI	TAL	HOM	PHO	62nd	13	
2023	Reaume Brothers Racing	33	Ford	DAY	LVS	ATL	COA	TEX	BRI	MAR	KAN	DAR	NWS	CLT	GTW	NSH; 26	MOH	POC	RCH	IRP	MLW	KAN; 28	BRI	TAL	HOM	PHO	60th	20	

=== CARS Late Model Stock Car Tour ===
(key) (Bold – Pole position awarded by qualifying time. Italics – Pole position earned by points standings or practice time. * – Most laps led. ** – All laps led.)

CARS Late Model Stock Car Tour results
Year	Team	No.	Make	1	2	3	4	5	6	7	8	9	10	11	12	13	14	15	CLMSCTC	Pts	Ref
2025	Hettinger Racing	5J	Chevy	AAS	WCS	CDL	OCS	ACE	NWS	LGY	DOM	CRW	HCY; DNQ	AND	FLC	SBO	TCM	NWS	106th	5	

^{*} Season still in progress
