= Andrew Gordon (racing driver) =

American racing driver (born 1990)

- Born: Andrew J. Gordon; April 18, 1990 (age 36); DuBois, Pennsylvania, U.S.

NASCAR FedEx Freight Truck Series career
- 3 races run over 2 years
- 2022 position: 75th
- Best finish: 70th (2021)
- First race: 2021 Pinty's Truck Race on Dirt (Bristol Dirt)
- Last race: 2022 Pinty's Truck Race on Dirt (Bristol Dirt)
Wins	Top tens	Poles
0	0	0
- Statistics up to date as of November 5, 2022.

Andrew J. Gordon (born April 18, 1990) is an American professional stock car racing driver. He last competed part-time in the NASCAR Craftsman Truck Series, driving the No. 47 Ford F-150 for G2G Racing.

== Personal life ==
Andrew is the nephew of former NASCAR driver Benny Gordon.

== Motorsports career results ==
=== NASCAR ===
==== Craftsman Truck Series ====
NASCAR Craftsman Truck Series results
Year	Team	No.	Make	1	2	3	4	5	6	7	8	9	10	11	12	13	14	15	16	17	18	19	20	21	22	23	NCTC	Pts	Ref
2021	CMI Motorsports	49	Chevy	DAY	DAY	LVS	ATL	BRI; 31	RCH	KAN	DAR	COA	CLT	TEX	NSH	POC											70th	19	
2021	CMI Motorsports	49	Ford														KNX; 24	GLN	GTW	DAR	BRI	LVS	TAL	MAR	PHO		70th	19	
2022	CMI Motorsports	49	Ford	DAY	LVS	ATL	COA	MAR	BRD; 32	DAR	KAN	TEX	CLT	GTW	SON	KNX	NSH	MOH	POC	IRP	RCH	KAN	BRI	TAL	HOM	PHO	75th	5	
2023	G2G Racing	47	Ford	DAY	LVS	ATL	COA	TEX	BRD; DNQ	MAR	KAN	DAR	NWS	CLT	GTW	NSH	MOH	POC	RCH	IRP	MLW	KAN	BRI	TAL	HOM	PHO	N/A	0^{1}	

^{*} Season still in progress
^{1} Ineligible for series points
