= G2G Racing =

American stock car racing team

- Owners: Tim Viens; Bill Shea
- Principal: Tim Silva (General Manager)
- Base: Mooresville, North Carolina
- Series: NASCAR Craftsman Truck Series
- Manufacturer: Toyota; Ford
- Opened: 2021
- Closed: 2023

Career
- Debut: NASCAR Craftsman Truck Series: 2022 NextEra Energy 250 (Daytona)
- Latest race: NASCAR Craftsman Truck Series: 2023 Baptist Health Cancer Care 200 (Homestead)
- Races competed: 27
- Drivers' Championships: 0
- Race victories: 0
- Pole positions: 0

G2G Racing, also known as Glory 2 God Racing, was an American stock car racing team that competed in the NASCAR Craftsman Truck Series, fielding the No. 47 Toyota Tundra part-time for multiple drivers.

== History ==
The team was first announced in an Instagram post by Viens in May 2021, stating that he had bought trucks from Kyle Busch Motorsports and would be starting his own team in the Truck Series.

The team also acquired all former CMI Motorsports assets from Ray Ciccarelli as well as GMS Racing and ThorSport Racing trucks.

=== NASCAR Craftsman Truck Series ===
==== Truck No. 46 history ====
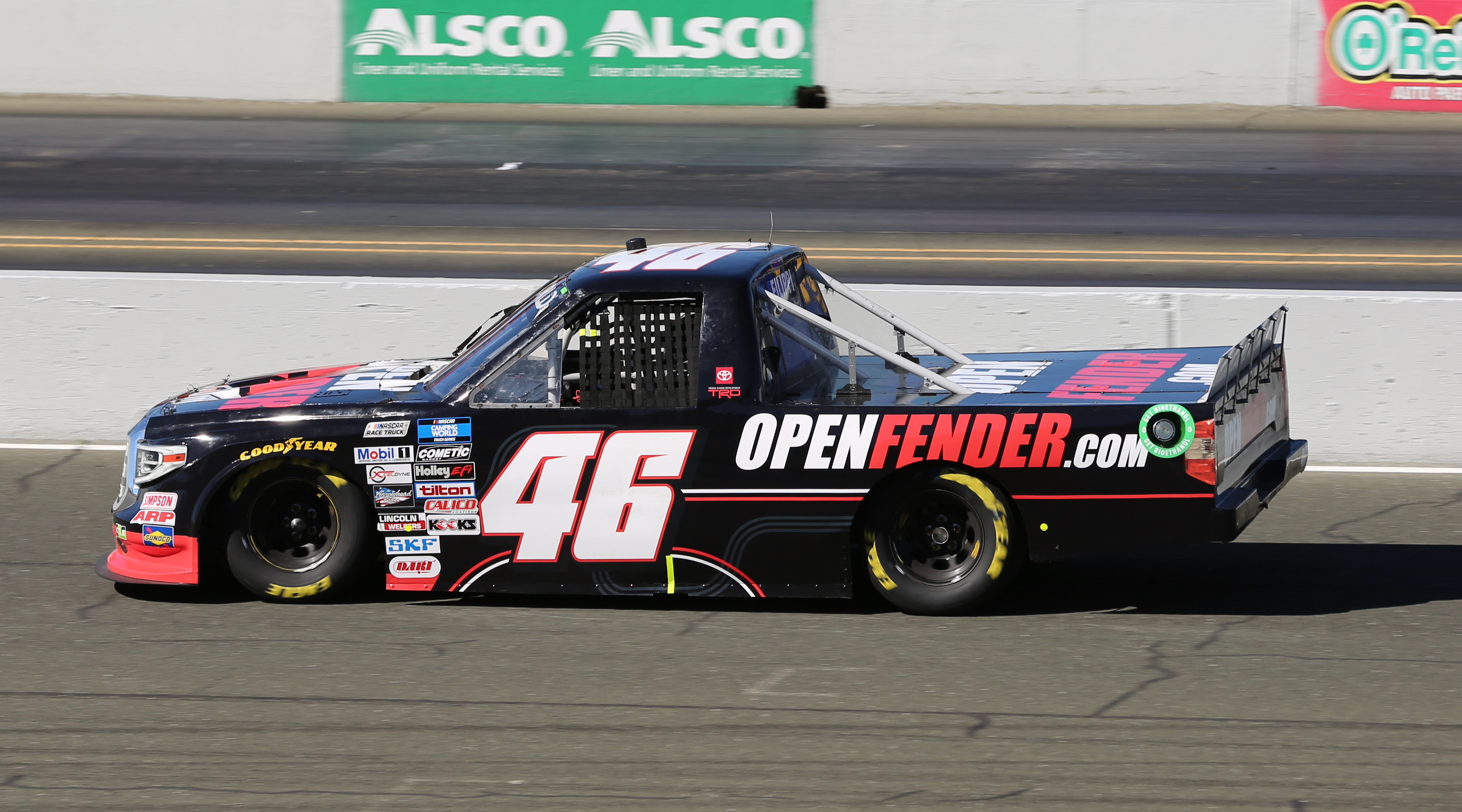
Stefan Parsons' No. 46 truck at Sonoma Raceway in 2022

On February 10, 2022, it was announced that Matt Jaskol would run full-time in the 2022 NASCAR Camping World Truck Series season driving the No. 46 Toyota Tundra. Jaskol would fail to qualify for the season-opener at Daytona. Brennan Poole would drive the No. 46 truck at Las Vegas with Jaskol instead driving G2G's No. 47 truck, but after Poole made the race and Jaskol did not, G2G decided to have Jaskol drive the No. 46 instead of Poole in that race. Jaskol would finish 22nd at Las Vegas, 19th at Atlanta, and 33rd at COTA in the No. 46 truck. Although Jaskol was originally on the entry list in the No. 46 for the race at Martinsville, it was announced on April 6 (the day before the race) that Kaden Honeycutt would replace Jaskol in the No. 46 and attempt to make his Truck Series debut. On April 7 (the day of the race), Jaskol revealed that he was released from G2G after the team wanted to amend Jaskol and his sponsor AutoParts4Less.com's full season contract and AutoParts4Less.com was "unable to accommodate their request".

In the Bristol Dirt Race, Andrew Gordon would make his return. The truck was a Ford instead of its usual Toyota. Later, NASCAR notified the team that the chassis for their No. 46 truck for the Bristol dirt race was registered to CMI Motorsports (who G2G had purchased the truck from). As a result, Viens had to withdraw the No. 46 truck from the race. Viens then phone called CMI owner Ray Ciccarelli who agreed to file a late entry and field the No. 49 truck for Gordon for the race. In Kansas, Ryan Huff would drive the No. 46 Truck. In Sonoma, Mason Filippi would attempt to make his Truck Series debuts at Sonoma in the No. 46 truck. Later, Stefan Parsons moved from the No. 47 to replace Filippi in the No. 46 truck in qualifying due to Filippi not adjusting to the truck well enough in practice. Bryson Mitchell drove the No. 46 truck at Knoxville. Chase Janes drove the No. 46 truck at Nashville. Owner Tim Viens drove the No. 46 truck at Talladega. He failed to qualify for the race.

In 2023, Norm Benning would attempt to qualify for the race at Daytona driving the No. 46 truck, replacing Johnny Sauter, who was originally on the entry list for the event.

Poole would return to the No. 46 making his season debut at Las Vegas finishing 33rd after suffering issues with the gearing. He would return later in the season at Kansas to pick up a very solid 20th place finish. He would return the next week at Darlington where he finished 36th.

==== Truck No. 46 results ====
Year	Driver	No.	Make	1	2	3	4	5	6	7	8	9	10	11	12	13	14	15	16	17	18	19	20	21	22	23	Owners	Pts
2022	Matt Jaskol	46	Toyota	DAY; DNQ	LVS; 22	ATL; 19	COA; 33																				39th	98
2022	Brennan Poole	46	Toyota		LVS; QL^{†}					DAR; 30		TEX; 23	CLT; 35	GTW; 34							RCH; DNQ	KAN; 34	BRI		HOM; 24	PHO	39th	98
2022	Kaden Honeycutt	46	Toyota					MAR; 34	BRD																		39th	98
2022	Ryan Huff	46	Toyota								KAN; 28																39th	98
2022	Stefan Parsons	46	Toyota												SON; 36												39th	98
2022	Bryson Mitchell	46	Toyota													KNX; 33											39th	98
2022	Chase Janes	46	Toyota														NSH; 36										39th	98
2022	Mason Filippi	46	Toyota															MOH; 36	POC	IRP							39th	98
2022	Tim Viens	46	Toyota																					TAL; DNQ			39th	98
2023	Norm Benning	46	Toyota	DAY; DNQ																							39th	75
2023	Brennan Poole	46	Toyota		LVS; 33						KAN; 20	DAR; 36															39th	75
2023	Akinori Ogata	46	Toyota			ATL; 17							NWS; Wth														39th	75
2023	Dale Quarterley	46	Toyota				COA; 28										MOH; 35	POC									39th	75
2023	Armani Williams	46	Toyota					TEX; 29						CLT; 35						IRP; DNQ	MLW	KAN	BRI	TAL	HOM; 31	PHO	39th	75
2023	Jerry Bohlman	46	Toyota						BRD; DNQ										RCH; DNQ								39th	75
2023	Memphis Villarreal	46	Toyota							MAR; 24					GTW; Wth	NSH; 35											39th	75
^{†} – Brennan Poole qualified the truck but was replaced by Matt Jaskol.

==== Truck No. 47 history ====
On February 3, 2022, it was announced that the No. 47 would be fielded full-time in 2022 and driven by Johnny Sauter, Tim Viens, and Roger Reuse.

Brennan Poole would drive the truck at Atlanta, setting a good pace with a 9th in the lone practice session but ultimately finishing 28th after having fuel pickup issues and losing all power on the backstretch while running 17th. Samuel LeComte would drive the truck at COTA but would ultimately fail to qualify. Viens was scheduled to make his first start of the season in the No. 47 at Martinsville, but the truck was withdrawn before the race. In Sonoma, Travis McCullough would both attempt to make his Truck Series debuts in the No. 47 truck. However, McCullough had to be replaced due to his drug test results not being returned in time for practice. (As it was his first start of the season, he had to take a drug test beforehand.) Stefan Parsons was going to replace him in the No. 47 truck for qualifying. However, Parsons moved from the No. 47 to replace Filippi in the No. 46 truck in qualifying due to Filippi not adjusting to the truck well enough in practice. The No. 47 truck was withdrawn. Kaden Honeycutt would drive the No. 47 truck at Nashville.

In 2023, Andrew Gordon would drive the No. 47 truck at Bristol Dirt. The truck was a Ford instead of its usual Toyota. He failed to qualify. Owner Viens drove the No. 47 truck at Kansas. He finished 36th. Dawson Cram would drive the truck at Darlington where he finished 35th.

==== Truck No. 47 results ====
NASCAR Craftsman Truck Series results
Year	Driver	No.	Make	1	2	3	4	5	6	7	8	9	10	11	12	13	14	15	16	17	18	19	20	21	22	23	Owners	Pts
2022	Johnny Sauter	47	Toyota	DAY; 34																							44th	28
2022	Matt Jaskol	47	Toyota		LVS; DNQ																						44th	28
2022	Brennan Poole	47	Toyota			ATL; 28								GTW; Wth													44th	28
2022	Samuel LeComte	47	Toyota				COA; DNQ																				44th	28
2022	Tim Viens	47	Toyota					MAR; Wth	BRI	DAR	KAN	TEX	CLT; Wth														44th	28
2022	Travis McCullough	47	Toyota												SON; Wth	KNX											44th	28
2022	Kaden Honeycutt	47	Toyota														NSH; 21	MOH	POC	IRP	RCH	KAN	BRI	TAL	HOM	PHO	44th	28
2023	Andrew Gordon	47	Ford	DAY	LVS	ATL	COA	TEX	BRD; DNQ	MAR																	57th	-22
2023	Tim Viens	47	Toyota								KAN; 36																57th	-22
2023	Dawson Cram	47	Toyota									DAR; 35	NWS	CHA	GTW	NSH	MOH	POC	RCH	IRP	MLW	KAN	BRI	TAL	HOM	PHO	57th	-22

=== ARCA Menards Series ===
On December 25, 2021, Tim Viens announced that he had bought an ARCA car from the closed Chad Bryant Racing team, hinting that G2G could field an ARCA Menards Series team in 2022 as well. However, the team has yet to announce any ARCA plans.

As of June 10, 2022, The car has been listed for sale by Viens.
