= Tanner Carrick =

American racing driver

- Born: January 17, 2002 (age 24); Lincoln, California, U.S.

NASCAR FedEx Freight Truck Series career
- 1 race run over 1 year
- 2023 position: 68th
- Best finish: 68th (2023)
- First race: 2023 Weather Guard Truck Race on Dirt (Bristol Dirt)
Wins	Top tens	Poles
0	0	0
- Statistics up to date as of July 28, 2023.

Tanner Carrick (born January 17, 2002) is an American racing driver who last competed part-time in the NASCAR Craftsman Truck Series driving the No. 30 Toyota Tundra for On Point Motorsports. Carrick competes mostly in dirt track racing, being a 17-time USAC midget winner and being the 2017 USAC National Series Rookie of the Year. He began racing at six years old in karts. Carrick made his NASCAR Craftsman Truck Series debut with On Point Motorsports at the 2023 Weather Guard Truck Race on Dirt at Bristol Motor Speedway. Carrick later revealed he received the offer to race at Bristol dirt from a direct message he received on Instagram.

== Motorsports career results ==
=== NASCAR ===
(key) (Bold – Pole position awarded by qualifying time. Italics – Pole position earned by points standings or practice time. * – Most laps led.)

==== Craftsman Truck Series ====
NASCAR Craftsman Truck Series results
Year	Team	No.	Make	1	2	3	4	5	6	7	8	9	10	11	12	13	14	15	16	17	18	19	20	21	22	23	NCTC	Pts	Ref
2023	On Point Motorsports	30	Toyota	DAY	LVS	ATL	COA	TEX	BRD; 26	MAR	KAN	DAR	NWS	CLT	GTW	NSH	MOH	POC	RCH	IRP	MLW	KAN	BRI	TAL	HOM	PHO	68th	11	
