= Bryson Mitchell =

American racing driver

- Born: April 3, 2003 (age 23); Russellville, Alabama, U.S.

NASCAR FedEx Freight Truck Series career
- 1 race run over 1 year
- 2022 position: 78th
- Best finish: 78th (2022)
- First race: 2022 Clean Harbors 150 (Knoxville)
Wins	Top tens	Poles
0	0	0
- Statistics up to date as of November 5, 2022.

Bryson Mitchell (born April 3, 2003) is an American professional dirt track racing driver who competes full-time in the Durrence Layne 602 Late Model Sportsman Series and previously part-time in the NASCAR Camping World Truck Series, driving the No. 46 Toyota Tundra for G2G Racing. His older brother Braden Mitchell also races.

== Motorsports career results ==
=== NASCAR ===
(key) (Bold – Pole position awarded by qualifying time. Italics – Pole position earned by points standings or practice time. * – Most laps led.)

==== Camping World Truck Series ====
NASCAR Camping World Truck Series results
Year	Team	No.	Make	1	2	3	4	5	6	7	8	9	10	11	12	13	14	15	16	17	18	19	20	21	22	23	NCWTS	Pts	Ref
2022	G2G Racing	46	Toyota	DAY	LVS	ATL	COA	MAR	BRI	DAR	KAN	TEX	CLT	GTW	SON	KNX; 33	NSH	MOH	POC	IRP	RCH	KAN	BRI	TAL	HOM	PHO	78th	4	

^{*} Season still in progress
