= Matt Jaskol =

American racing driver

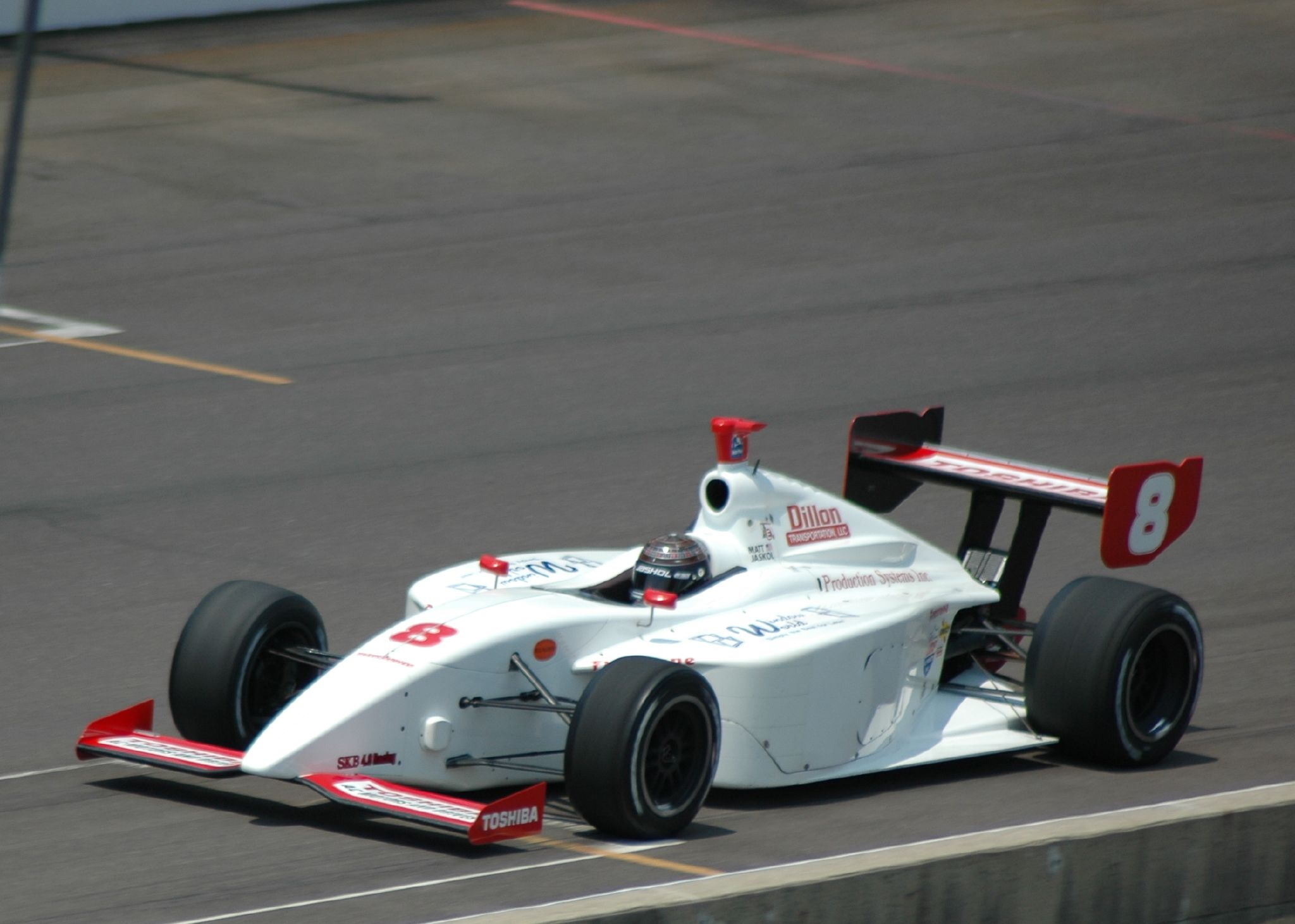
- Jaskol driving in the 2007 Freedom 100
- Born: Matthew Allen Jaskol; October 15, 1984 (age 42); Thousand Oaks, California, U.S.

NASCAR O'Reilly Auto Parts Series career
- 8 races run over 2 years
- 2022 position: 97th
- Best finish: 50th (2021)
- First race: 2021 Cook Out 250 (Martinsville)
- Last race: 2022 Alsco Uniforms 302 (Las Vegas)
Wins	Top tens	Poles
0	0	0

NASCAR FedEx Freight Truck Series career
- 3 races run over 1 year
- 2022 position: 47th
- Best finish: 47th (2022)
- First race: 2022 Victoria's Voice Foundation 200 (Las Vegas)
- Last race: 2022 XPEL 225 (Austin)
Wins	Top tens	Poles
0	0	0

Previous series
- 2007 2005, 2008 2005 2004 2004: Indy Pro Series; ASA Speed Truck Challenge; Star Mazda Championship; North American Formula Renault 2000; Formula BMW USA

Championship titles
- 2005 1998 1998: ASA Speed Truck Challenge; SKUSA SuperNationals; WKA Constructors
- Statistics up to date as of March 13, 2024.

Matthew Allen Jaskol (born October 15, 1984) is an American professional auto racing driver and spotter. He has competed in a variety of different racing disciplines including kart, open-wheel, and stock car racing (including the NASCAR Xfinity and Truck Series). As a spotter, Jaskol won the 2016 Indianapolis 500 as the spotter for Alexander Rossi.

After spending much of his early career in karting, Jaskol became a member of the Red Bull Driver Search and competed in Formula BMW USA, where he won Red Bull's first race in North America in 2004. The following year, he won the American Speed Association Speed Truck Challenge championship. He would later race in the Indy Pro Series and the NASCAR Whelen All-American Series.

Jaskol also works as a skydiver, driving instructor, and stunt driver.

== Racing career ==
Jaskol began his career in motorcycle racing, driving in the World Mini Motorcycle series at Las Vegas Motor Speedway in 1994. After moving into karts, he won the Superkarts! USA (SKUSA) SuperNationals 80cc Shifter Class and a World Karting Association championship in 1998. In 2000, he was recruited by CART driver Paul Tracy to drive for his factory karting team. Two years later, Jaskol won a racing scholarship at the Skip Barber Scholarship Runoffs, which was followed by finishing third in the 2003 Skip Barber National Championship.

In 2003, Jaskol was one of four drivers selected for the Red Bull Driver Search, which provided him with Red Bull sponsorship for the 2004 racing season. That year, he entered the newly created Formula BMW USA series. Jaskol won three races at Circuit Gilles Villeneuve, Indianapolis Motor Speedway, and Mazda Raceway Laguna Seca as he finished fourth in points; the Circuit Gilles Villeneuve victory marked the first motorsports win for the Red Bull brand in North America. Jaskol also won in his lone North American Formula Renault 2000 start at Molson Indy Toronto.

For 2005, Jaskol raced in the Star Mazda Championship and the American Speed Association's Speed Truck Challenge. In the former, he scored podium finishes in the first two races for Hearn Motorsports before departing the team to focus on the Speed Truck Challenge as he was leading the points in that series at the time. The move was also spurred by a lack of financial support in open-wheel racing and the desire to race in NASCAR. Driving for United Nissan Auto Team, Jaskol would become the first rookie to win the championship in Speed Truck Challenge history. In July, he tested a NASCAR Truck for Roush Racing at Martinsville Speedway as part of the team's "Gong Show". He and his Red Bull peers were also test drivers for A1 Grand Prix team A1 Team USA.

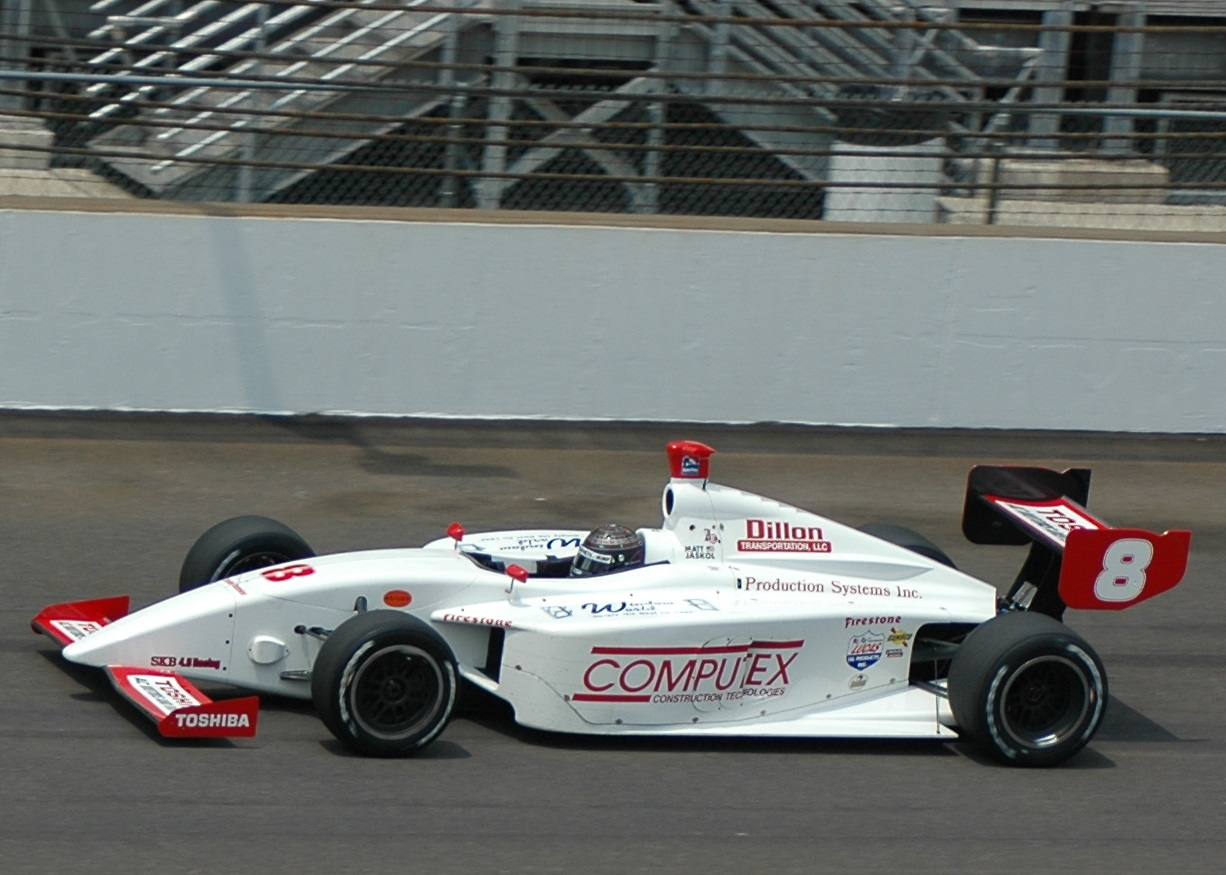
Jaskol competing in the 2007 Freedom 100

Besides continuing to race stock cars such as late models at Las Vegas Motor Speedway's Bullring, Jaskol signed with Michael Crawford Motorsports to compete in the Indy Pro Series in 2007. He ran five Indy Pro races with a best finish of seventh in the Freedom 100 at Indianapolis and his final start at Infineon Raceway.

Jaskol focused on the NASCAR Whelen All-American Series in 2008, primarily competing at the LVMS Bullring and winning three times. He also returned to the Speed Truck Challenge and won on Phoenix International Raceway's road course; another victory in the series came at Firebird Raceway in 2010.

In May 2015, Jaskol competed in the Best in the Desert's Silver State 300, finishing third in the UTV Pro 1900 alongside Scott Yancey, Derryke Rich, and Robert Casey Wiesel. His driving career would be halted that year as he concentrated on his family business. In 2016, he was the spotter for Alexander Rossi in practice for the Indianapolis 500, a race that Rossi went on to win; Jaskol previously tutored Rossi in karting. The two also entered the SKUSA SuperNationals later in the year. For the 2019 Indianapolis 500, Jaskol served as the spotter for Rossi's Andretti Autosport teammate Marco Andretti.

In 2021, Jaskol joined MBM Motorsports on a four-race schedule in NASCAR Xfinity Series beginning at Martinsville in April. The opportunity arose when Jaskol was introduced to team owner Carl Long by driver Stan Mullis.

On February 10, 2022, it was announced that Jaskol would run full-time for the NASCAR Camping World Truck Series in 2022 for the new G2G Racing team owned by Tim Viens, driving his No. 46 Toyota Tundra. Jaskol would fail to qualify for the season-opener at Daytona. Jaskol would fail to qualify again at Las Vegas, this time in Las Vegas and with the No. 47, but Brennan Poole gave him his No. 46. On April 7, Jaskol revealed in a tweet that he had parted ways with G2G Racing. Prior to the Martinsville race, G2G suspended Jaskol's contract due to a disagreement between the team and Jaskol's sponsor AutoParts4Less.com.

Jaskol did not make any NASCAR starts in 2023. On March 11, 2024, Jaskol tweeted that he would be making his NASCAR Cup Series debut in the race at Circuit of the Americas in the No. 66 car for MBM Motorsports, who he previously drove part-time for in the Xfinity Series in 2021 and 2022. Two days later, Jaskol posted that he had failed to secure sponsorship in time for the race (the No. 66 would be driven by Timmy Hill), but that he still planned on making a start with MBM later this season, although that never came to fruition.

== In media ==
Jaskol has worked as a stunt driver for productions like the movie Smiley Face Killers.

In 2018, Jaskol participated in the ABC reality television series Castaways. He was one of five contestants who survived all 41 days.

== Personal life ==
Born in Thousand Oaks, California, Jaskol lives in Las Vegas, where he works as a driving instructor and skydiver. He was the head presenter for Bridgestone's Teens Drive Smart program from 2011 to 2015. From 2011 to 2016, he was the track manager and lead teacher at Dream Racing in Las Vegas. Jaskol also provides drifting and driving demonstrations at SEMA and meetings for car manufacturers like Kia, Mercedes-Benz, and Toyota.

Jaskol's family operates Mountain West Floors, a woodworking business in Las Vegas. In 2015, he took over the company, which was facing bankruptcy, after his father suffered a heart attack.

== Motorsports career results ==
=== American open–wheel racing results ===
(key) (Races in bold indicate pole position)

==== Indy Pro Series ====
Year	Team	1	2	3	4	5	6	7	8	9	10	11	12	13	14	15	16	Rank	Points	Ref
2007	Michael Crawford Motorsports	HMS	STP1; 18	STP2; 13	INDY; 7	MIL	IMS1	IMS2	IOW	WGL1	WGL2	NSH	MOH	KTY	SNM1; 11	SNM2; 7	CHI	**24th**	**100**	

=== NASCAR ===
(key) (Bold – Pole position awarded by qualifying time. Italics – Pole position earned by points standings or practice time. * – Most laps led.)

==== Xfinity Series ====
NASCAR Xfinity Series results
Year	Team	No.	Make	1	2	3	4	5	6	7	8	9	10	11	12	13	14	15	16	17	18	19	20	21	22	23	24	25	26	27	28	29	30	31	32	33	NXSC	Pts	Ref
2021	MBM Motorsports	13	Toyota	DAY	DAY	HOM	LVS	PHO	ATL	MAR; 28	TAL	DAR; 34	DOV; 39	COA	CLT																						50th	51	
2021	MBM Motorsports	66	Toyota													MOH; 19				ROA; DNQ	ATL	NHA	GLN	IND; DNQ	MCH	DAY	DAR	RCH	BRI	LVS; 27	TAL	CLT	TEX	KAN	MAR	PHO	50th	51	
2021	MBM Motorsports	61	Toyota														TEX; 27	NSH	POC																		50th	51	
2022	MBM Motorsports	13	Toyota	DAY	CAL	LVS	PHO	ATL	COA	RCH	MAR	TAL	DOV	DAR	TEX	CLT	PIR; 18	NSH	ROA	ATL	NHA	POC	IND	MCH	GLN	DAY	DAR	KAN	BRI	TEX	TAL	CLT	LVS; 32	HOM	MAR	PHO	97th	0^{1}	

==== Camping World Truck Series ====
NASCAR Camping World Truck Series results
Year	Team	No.	Make	1	2	3	4	5	6	7	8	9	10	11	12	13	14	15	16	17	18	19	20	21	22	23	NCWTC	Pts	Ref
2022	G2G Racing	46	Toyota	DAY; DNQ	LVS; 22	ATL; 19	COA; 33	MAR	BRI	DAR	KAN	TEX	CLT	GTW	SON	KNO	NSH	MOH	POC	IRP	RCH	KAN	BRI	TAL	HOM	PHO	47th	37	
2022	G2G Racing	47	Toyota		LVS; DNQ																						47th	37	

^{*} Season still in progress
