= 2023 NASCAR Craftsman Truck Series =

American motorsport season

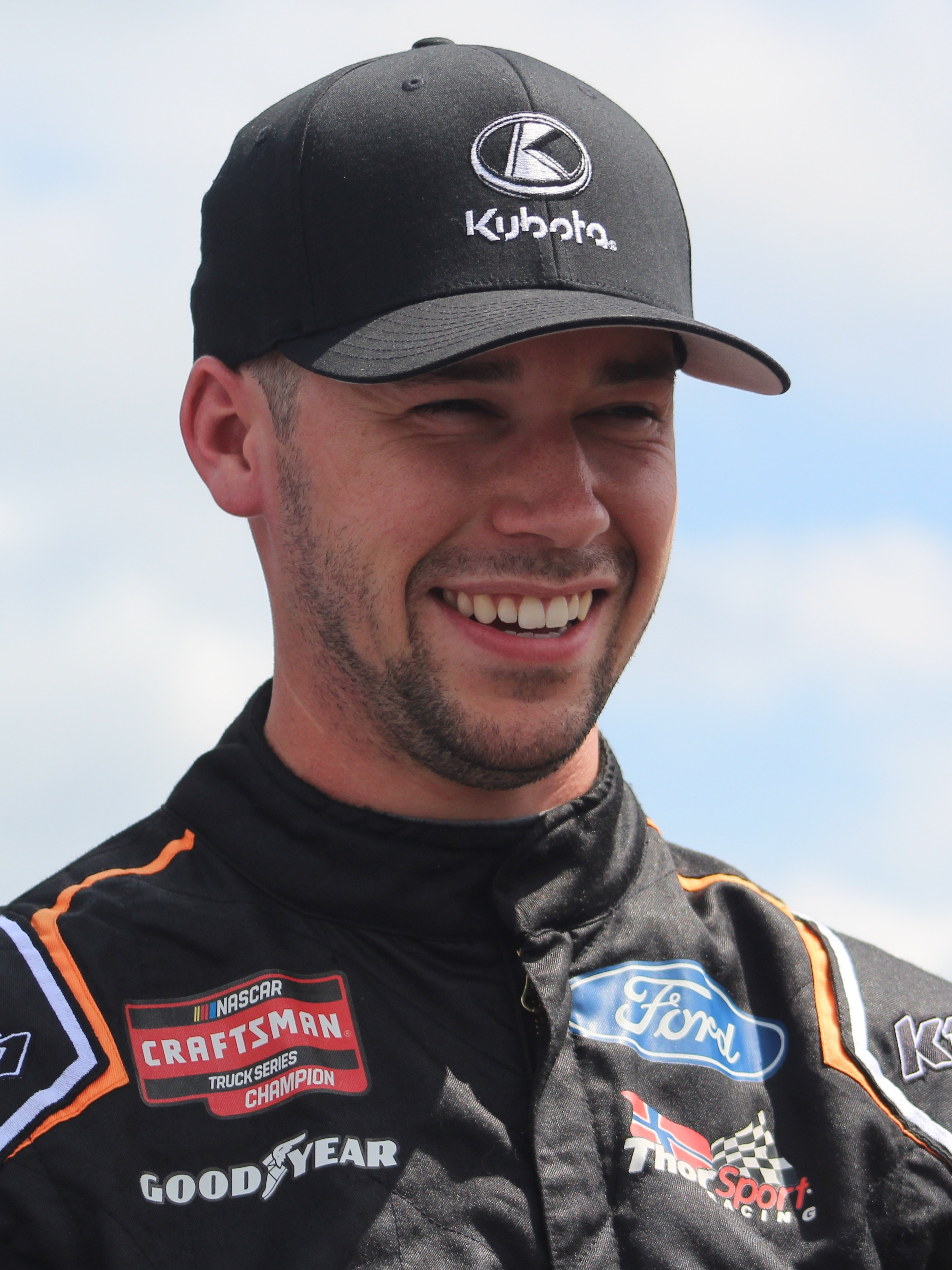
Ben Rhodes, the 2023 Craftsman Truck Series champion.

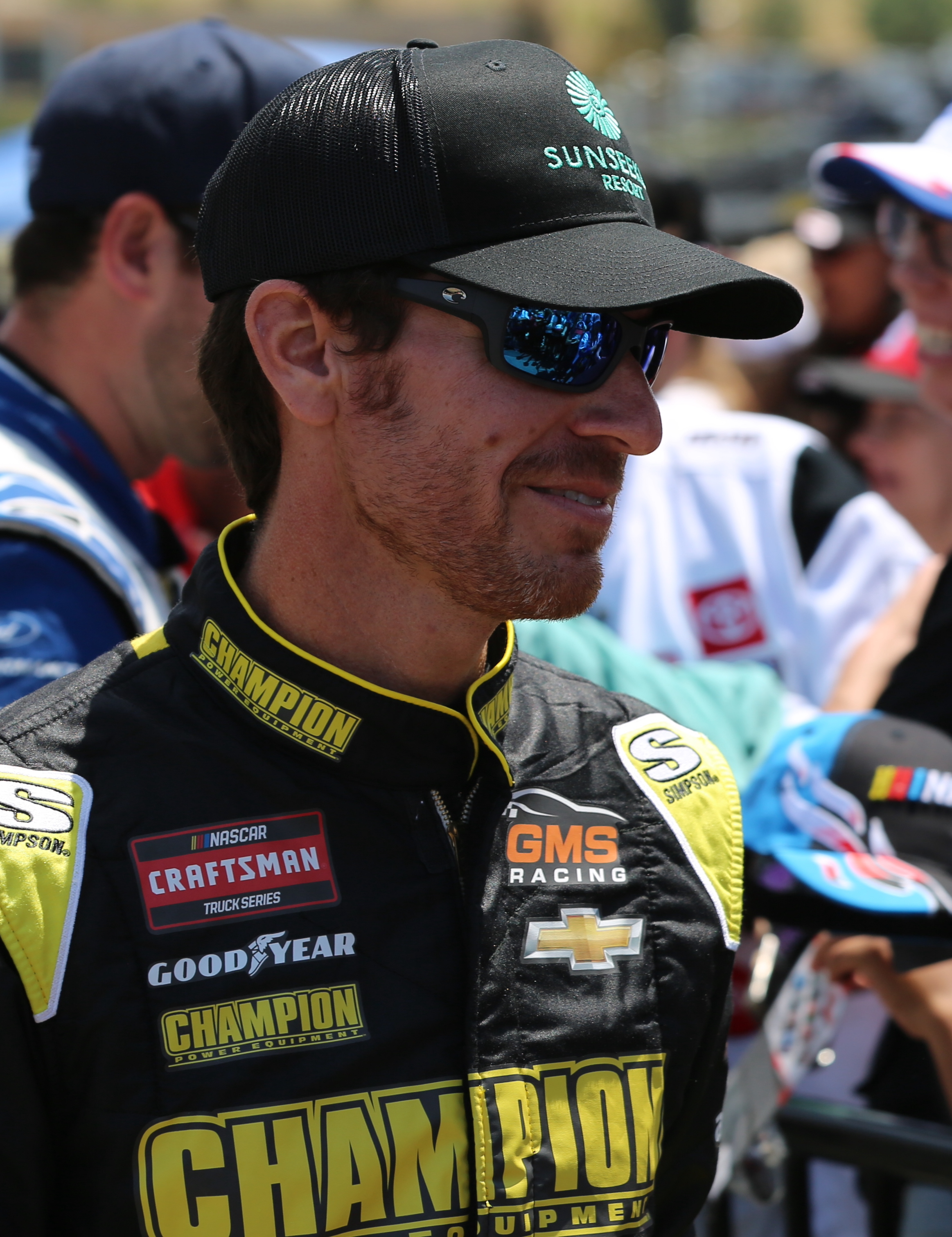
Grant Enfinger finished second behind Rhodes in the championship.

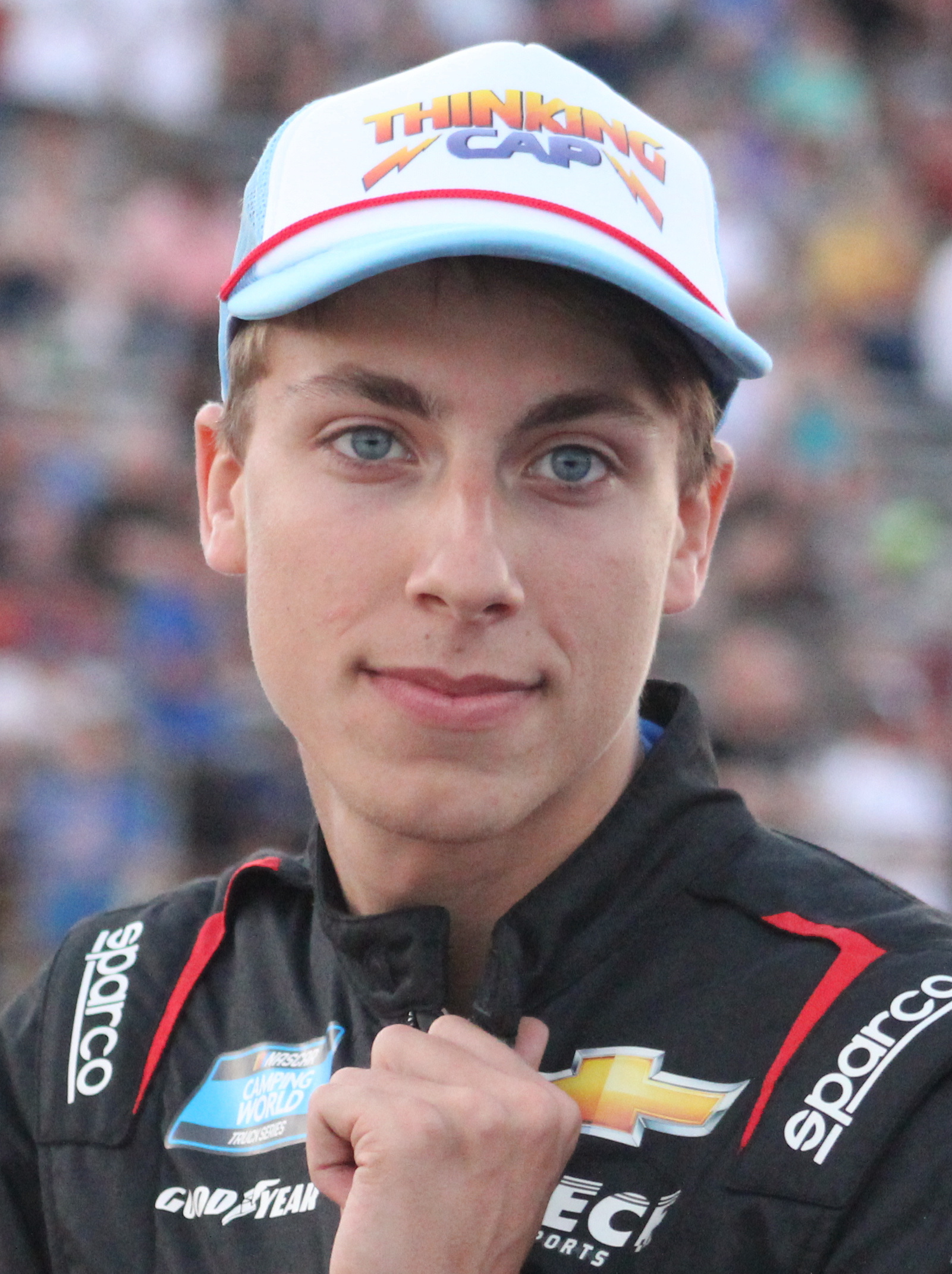
Carson Hocevar finished third in the championship.

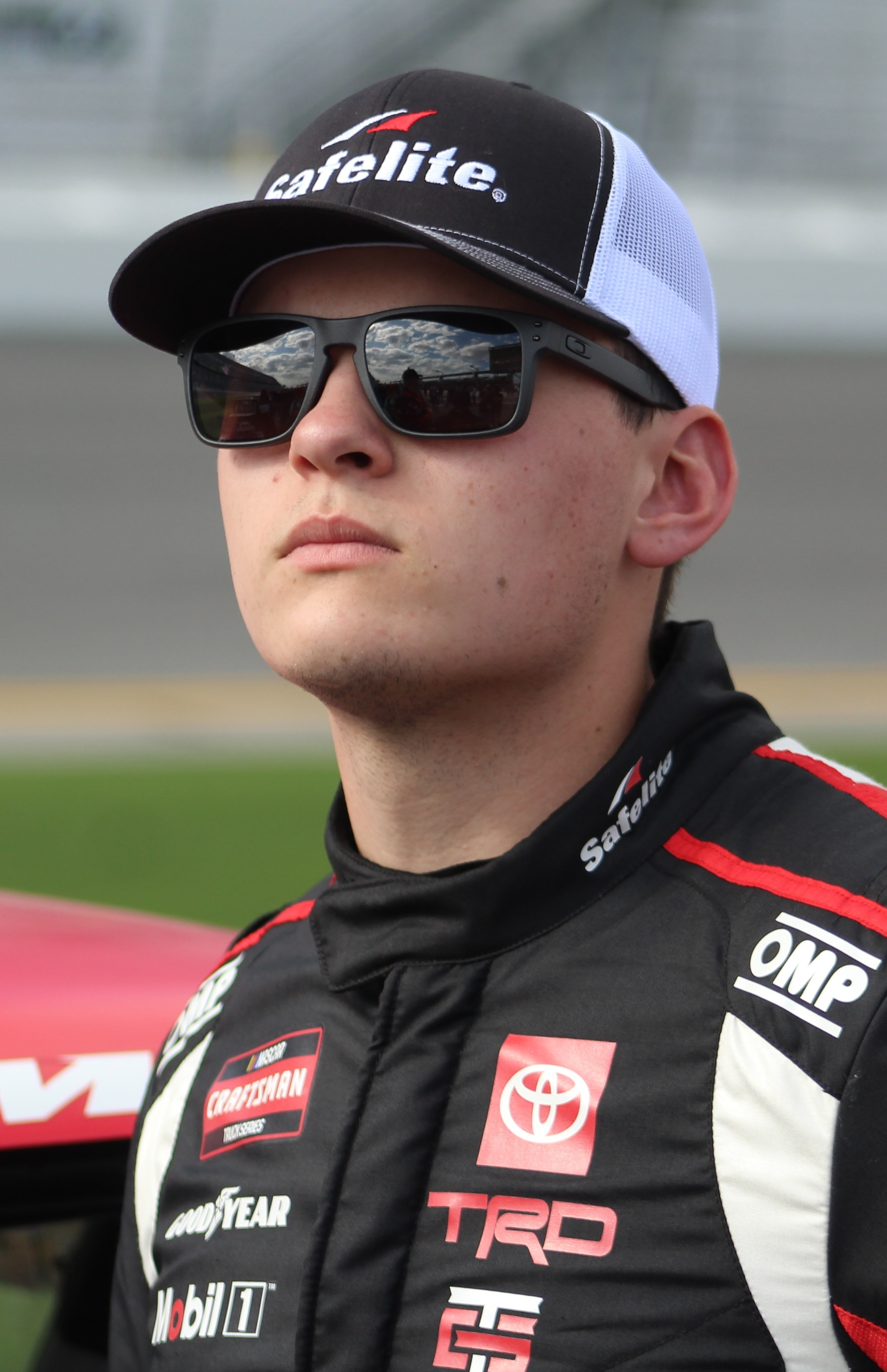
Corey Heim won the regular season championship, but finished fourth in the championship.

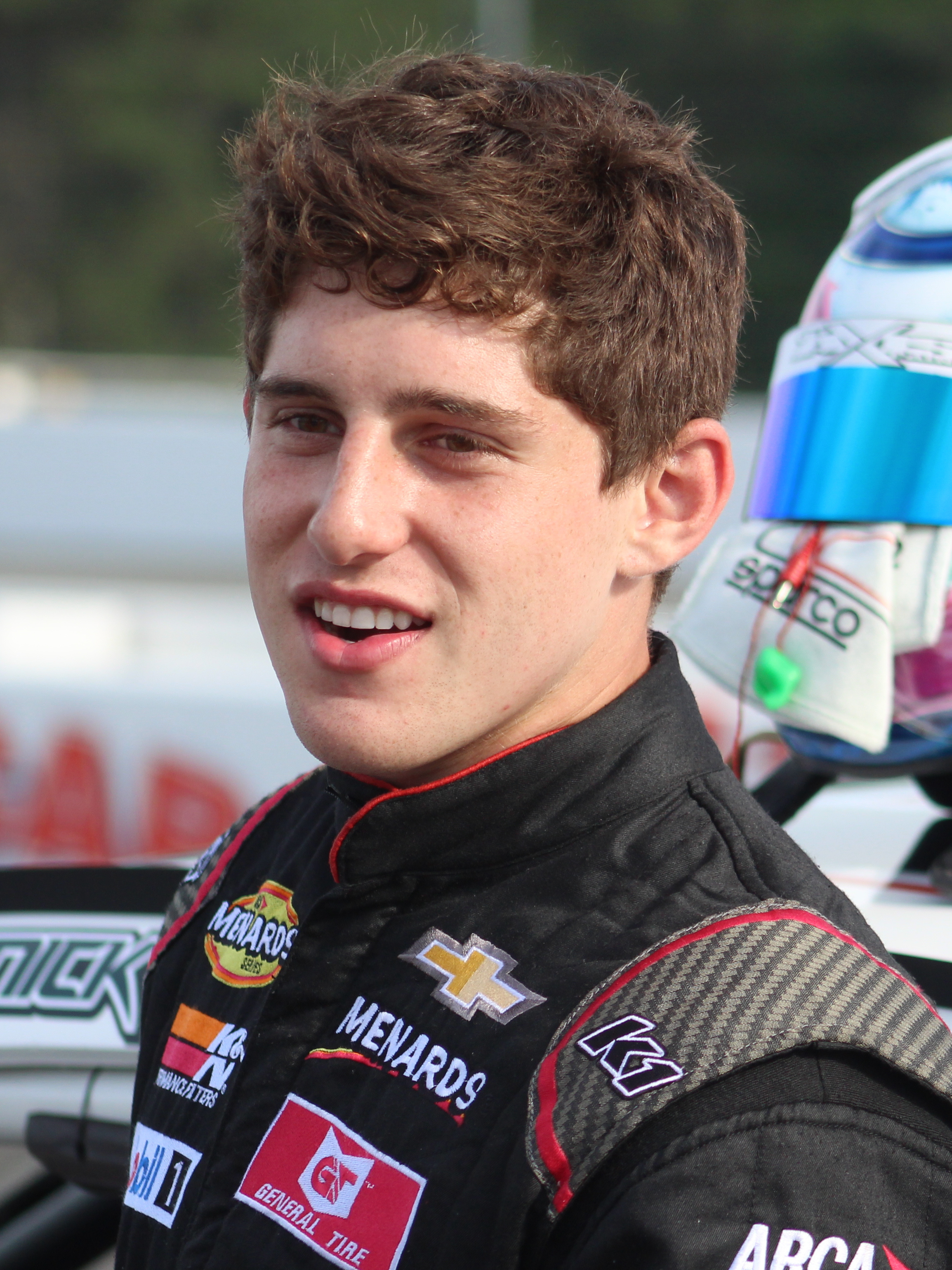
Nick Sanchez, the Craftsman Truck Series Rookie of the Year.

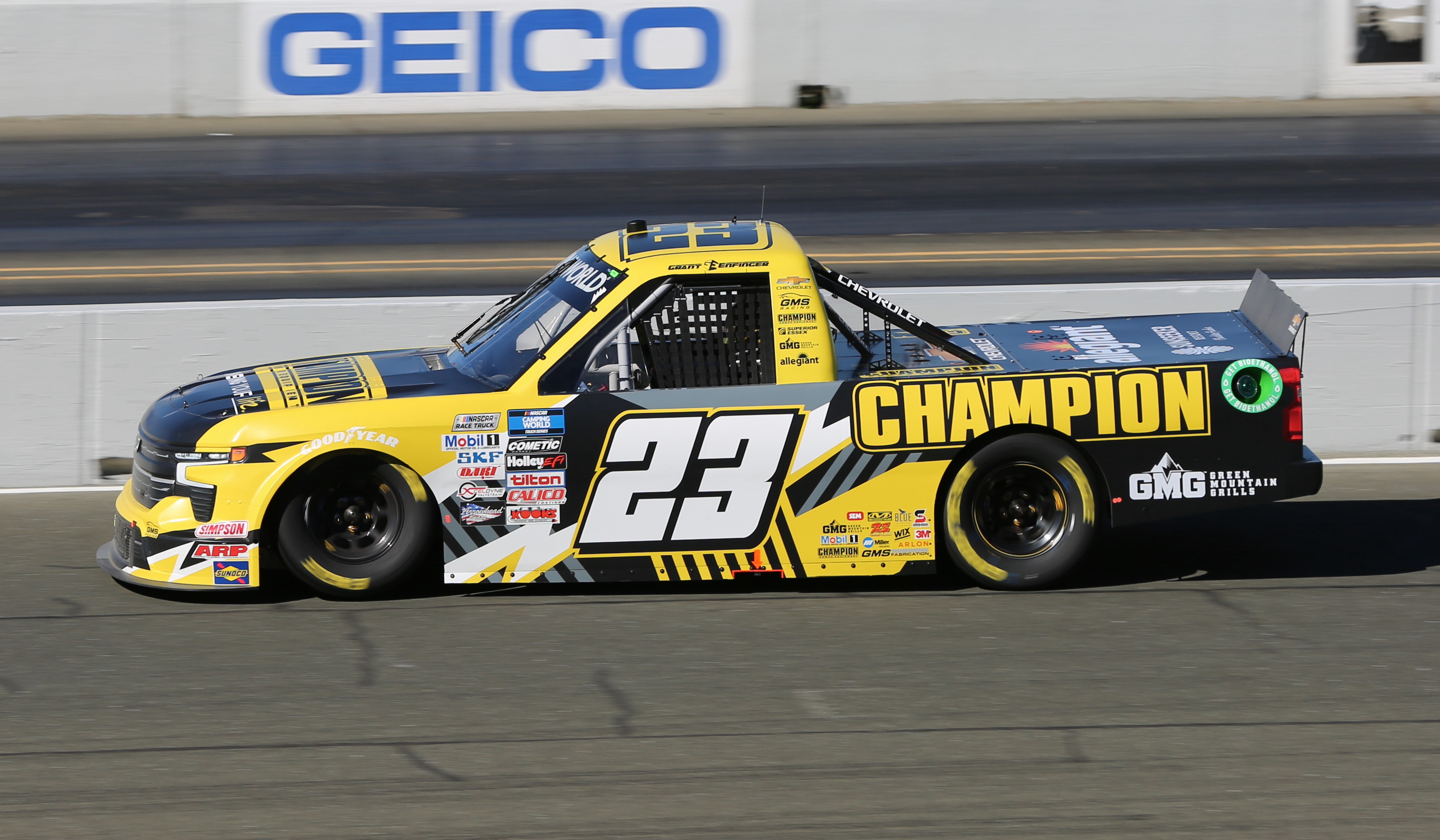
Chevrolet won the manufacturers' championship with 868 points and 14 wins.

The 2023 NASCAR Craftsman Truck Series was the 29th season of the NASCAR Craftsman Truck Series, a Pickup truck racing series sanctioned by NASCAR in the United States. The season started with the NextEra Energy 250 on February 17 at Daytona International Speedway, and ended with the Craftsman 150 on November 3 at Phoenix Raceway.

This was the first season of the Truck Series with Stanley Black & Decker as the series sponsor. Camping World, the title sponsor of the series from 2009 to 2022, did not renew their title sponsorship of the series. Although the Craftsman brand had sponsored the series from 1995 to 2008, it was under a different company ownership (Sears).

Zane Smith entered the season as the defending champion, returning to the Front Row Motorsports No. 38 truck full-time in 2023 seeking to win a second consecutive championship.

Corey Heim of Tricon Garage accomplished a rare feat in NASCAR during the season. He was the points leader heading into the 2023 Toyota 200 at Gateway, which he had to miss due to being sick, and after that race, (although only by 1 point) he was still the points leader. At the conclusion of the 2023 Worldwide Express 250 at Richmond, Heim claimed the regular season championship. In addition, Nick Sanchez of Rev Racing won NASCAR Rookie of the Year honors. Ben Rhodes of ThorSport Racing won his second Truck Series championship at season's end.

== Teams and drivers ==
=== Complete schedule ===
| Manufacturer | Team | No. | Driver | Crew chief |
|---|---|---|---|---|
| Chevrolet | CR7 Motorsports | 9 | Colby Howard | Doug George 17; Michael Shelton 6 |
| Chevrolet | GMS Racing | 23 | Grant Enfinger | Jeff Hensley |
| Chevrolet | GMS Racing | 24 | Rajah Caruth (R) | Chad Walter |
| Chevrolet | GMS Racing | 43 | Daniel Dye (R) | Travis Sharpe 7 Blake Bainbridge 16 |
| Chevrolet | McAnally–Hilgemann Racing | 19 | Christian Eckes | Charles Denike |
| Chevrolet | McAnally–Hilgemann Racing | 35 | Chase Elliott 1 | Mark Hillman |
| Chevrolet | McAnally–Hilgemann Racing | 35 | Jake Garcia (R) 22 | Mark Hillman |
| Chevrolet | Kyle Busch Motorsports | 4 | Chase Purdy | Jimmy Villeneuve |
| Chevrolet | Kyle Busch Motorsports | 51 | Jack Wood 13 | Brian Pattie |
| Chevrolet | Kyle Busch Motorsports | 51 | Kyle Busch 5 | Brian Pattie |
| Chevrolet | Kyle Busch Motorsports | 51 | William Byron 3 | Brian Pattie |
| Chevrolet | Kyle Busch Motorsports | 51 | Matt Mills 2 | Brian Pattie |
| Chevrolet | Niece Motorsports | 41 | Travis Pastrana 1 | Mike Hillman Jr. |
| Chevrolet | Niece Motorsports | 41 | Ross Chastain 7 | Mike Hillman Jr. |
| Chevrolet | Niece Motorsports | 41 | Bayley Currey 11 | Mike Hillman Jr. |
| Chevrolet | Niece Motorsports | 41 | Chad Chastain 1 | Mike Hillman Jr. |
| Chevrolet | Niece Motorsports | 41 | Tyler Carpenter 1 | Mike Hillman Jr. |
| Chevrolet | Niece Motorsports | 41 | Conor Daly 1 | Mike Hillman Jr. |
| Chevrolet | Niece Motorsports | 41 | Shane van Gisbergen 1 | Mike Hillman Jr. |
| Chevrolet | Niece Motorsports | 42 | Carson Hocevar | Phil Gould |
| Chevrolet | Niece Motorsports | 45 | Lawless Alan | Wally Rogers |
| Chevrolet | Rackley W.A.R. | 25 | Matt DiBenedetto 20 | Chad Kendrick |
| Chevrolet | Rackley W.A.R. | 25 | Chandler Smith 1 | Chad Kendrick |
| Chevrolet | Rackley W.A.R. | 25 | Trevor Bayne 1 | Chad Kendrick |
| Chevrolet | Rackley W.A.R. | 25 | Stefan Parsons 1 | Chad Kendrick |
| Chevrolet | Rev Racing | 2 | Nick Sanchez (R) | Danny Stockman Jr. |
| Chevrolet | Young's Motorsports | 02 | Kris Wright 11 | Andrew Abbott |
| Chevrolet | Young's Motorsports | 02 | Chris Hacker 1 | Andrew Abbott |
| Chevrolet | Young's Motorsports | 02 | Layne Riggs 1 | Andrew Abbott |
| Chevrolet | Young's Motorsports | 02 | Will Rodgers 2 | Andrew Abbott |
| Chevrolet | Young's Motorsports | 02 | Stefan Parsons 1 | Andrew Abbott |
| Chevrolet | Young's Motorsports | 02 | Matt Mills 1 | Andrew Abbott |
| Chevrolet | Young's Motorsports | 02 | Josh Bilicki 1 | Andrew Abbott |
| Chevrolet | Young's Motorsports | 02 | Kaden Honeycutt 3 | Andrew Abbott |
| Chevrolet | Young's Motorsports | 02 | Garrett Smithley 1 | Andrew Abbott |
| Chevrolet | Young's Motorsports | 02 | Brad Perez 1 | Andrew Abbott |
| Chevrolet | Young's Motorsports | 12 | Spencer Boyd (Note: Stefan Parsons practiced and qualified the No. 12 truck for Spencer Boyd at COTA due to Boyd's flight to the track being delayed.) | Brad Means 8 Tyler Young 15 |
| Chevrolet | Young's Motorsports | 20 | Derek Kraus 1 | Joe Lax |
| Chevrolet | Young's Motorsports | 20 | Matt Mills 5 | Joe Lax |
| Chevrolet | Young's Motorsports | 20 | Mason Maggio 1 | Joe Lax |
| Chevrolet | Young's Motorsports | 20 | Ed Jones 1 | Joe Lax |
| Chevrolet | Young's Motorsports | 20 | Stefan Parsons 1 | Joe Lax |
| Chevrolet | Young's Motorsports | 20 | Brad Perez 1 | Joe Lax |
| Chevrolet | Young's Motorsports | 20 | Nick Leitz 4 | Joe Lax |
| Chevrolet | Young's Motorsports | 20 | Kaden Honeycutt 2 | Joe Lax |
| Chevrolet | Young's Motorsports | 20 | Chad Chastain 1 | Joe Lax |
| Chevrolet | Young's Motorsports | 20 | Mason Massey 1 | Joe Lax |
| Chevrolet | Young's Motorsports | 20 | Greg Van Alst 5 | Joe Lax |
| Ford | Front Row Motorsports | 38 | Zane Smith | Chris Lawson |
| Ford | Reaume Brothers Racing | 33 | Mason Massey 7 | Gregory Rayl 12; Pedro Lopez 3 John Reaume 3 Todd Parrott 5 |
| Ford | Reaume Brothers Racing | 33 | Mason Maggio 1 | Gregory Rayl 12; Pedro Lopez 3 John Reaume 3 Todd Parrott 5 |
| Ford | Reaume Brothers Racing | 33 | Josh Reaume 7 | Gregory Rayl 12; Pedro Lopez 3 John Reaume 3 Todd Parrott 5 |
| Ford | Reaume Brothers Racing | 33 | Chase Janes 2 | Gregory Rayl 12; Pedro Lopez 3 John Reaume 3 Todd Parrott 5 |
| Ford | Reaume Brothers Racing | 33 | Derek Lemke 2 | Gregory Rayl 12; Pedro Lopez 3 John Reaume 3 Todd Parrott 5 |
| Ford | Reaume Brothers Racing | 33 | Memphis Villarreal 2 | Gregory Rayl 12; Pedro Lopez 3 John Reaume 3 Todd Parrott 5 |
| Ford | Reaume Brothers Racing | 33 | Keith McGee 2 | Gregory Rayl 12; Pedro Lopez 3 John Reaume 3 Todd Parrott 5 |
| Ford | ThorSport Racing | 13 | Hailie Deegan | Rich Lushes 19; Brian Ross 4 |
| Ford | ThorSport Racing | 88 | Matt Crafton | Shane Wilson 11; Jeriod Prince 12 |
| Ford | ThorSport Racing | 98 | Ty Majeski | Joe Shear Jr. 18; Ron Calhoun 5 |
| Ford | ThorSport Racing | 99 | Ben Rhodes | Jeriod Prince 11; Brian Ross 8 Rich Lushes 4 |
| Toyota | Halmar Friesen Racing | 52 | Stewart Friesen | Jon Leonard 2 Blake Bainbridge 5 Bob Heilbrun 16 |
| Toyota | Hattori Racing Enterprises | 16 | Tyler Ankrum | Doug Randolph |
| Toyota | Hill Motorsports | 56 | Timmy Hill 14 | Terry Elmore |
| Toyota | Hill Motorsports | 56 | Tyler Hill 9 | Terry Elmore |
| Toyota | Tricon Garage | 5 | Dean Thompson | Derek Smith |
| Toyota | Tricon Garage | 11 | Corey Heim 22 | Scott Zipadelli |
| Toyota | Tricon Garage | 11 | Jesse Love 1 | Scott Zipadelli |
| Toyota | Tricon Garage | 15 | Tanner Gray | Jerame Donley |
| Toyota | Tricon Garage | 17 | Sammy Smith 1 | Billy Wilburn 13; Jacob Hampton 10 |
| Toyota | Tricon Garage | 17 | John Hunter Nemechek 2 | Billy Wilburn 13; Jacob Hampton 10 |
| Toyota | Tricon Garage | 17 | Taylor Gray 20 | Billy Wilburn 13; Jacob Hampton 10 |

=== Limited schedule ===
| Manufacturer | Team | No. | Driver | Crew chief | Rounds |
|---|---|---|---|---|---|
| Chevrolet | BlackJack Racing | 21 | Dexter Bean | Mario Gosselin | 1 |
| Chevrolet | Bret Holmes Racing | 32 | Bret Holmes (R) | Jerry Baxter 16; Jeff Stankiewicz 2 R. J. Otto 3 | 21 |
| Chevrolet | CR7 Motorsports | 97 | Codie Rohrbaugh | Michael Shelton | 1 |
| Chevrolet | FDNY Racing | 28 | Bryan Dauzat | Jim Rosenblum | 3 |
| Chevrolet | Henderson Motorsports | 75 | Parker Kligerman | Chris Carrier | 8 |
| Chevrolet | Henderson Motorsports | 75 | Sean Hingorani | Chris Carrier | 1 |
| Chevrolet | Jennifer Jo Cobb Racing | 10 | Jennifer Jo Cobb | Steve Kuykendall | 2 |
| Chevrolet | NEMCO Motorsports | 8 | Samuel LeComte | Joe Nemechek | 1 |
| Chevrolet | Niece Motorsports | 44 | Kaden Honeycutt | Cody Efaw 2 Tim Mooney 1 | 1 |
| Chevrolet | Niece Motorsports | 44 | Chad Chastain | Cody Efaw 2 Tim Mooney 1 | 1 |
| Chevrolet | Niece Motorsports | 44 | Danny Bohn | Cody Efaw 2 Tim Mooney 1 | 1 |
| Chevrolet | Norm Benning Racing | 6 | Norm Benning | Dan Killius | 4 |
| Chevrolet | Spire Motorsports | 7 | Corey LaJoie | Kevin Manion | 2 |
| Chevrolet | Spire Motorsports | 7 | Alex Bowman | Kevin Manion | 1 |
| Chevrolet | Spire Motorsports | 7 | Jonathan Davenport | Kevin Manion | 1 |
| Chevrolet | Spire Motorsports | 7 | Kyle Larson | Kevin Manion | 1 |
| Chevrolet | Spire Motorsports | 7 | Marco Andretti | Kevin Manion | 3 |
| Chevrolet | Spire Motorsports | 7 | Austin Hill | Kevin Manion | 1 |
| Chevrolet | Spire Motorsports | 7 | Layne Riggs | Kevin Manion | 1 |
| Chevrolet | Spire Motorsports | 7 | Derek Kraus | Kevin Manion | 1 |
| Chevrolet | Spire Motorsports | 7 | Carson Kvapil | Kevin Manion | 1 |
| Chevrolet | Spire Motorsports | 77 | Derek Kraus | Andrew Overstreet | 1 |
| Chevrolet | Trey Hutchens Racing | 14 | Trey Hutchens | Bobby Hutchens | 3 |
| Ford | AM Racing | 22 | Josh Reaume | Ryan London | 5 (Note: Entries were fielded in a collaboration with Reaume Brothers Racing.) |
| Ford | AM Racing | 22 | Max Gutiérrez | Ryan London | 1 |
| Ford | AM Racing | 22 | Logan Bearden | Ryan London | 2 |
| Ford | AM Racing | 22 | Chase Briscoe | Ryan London | 1 |
| Ford | AM Racing | 22 | Stephen Mallozzi | Ryan London | 3 |
| Ford | AM Racing | 22 | Josh Williams | Ryan London | 1 |
| Ford | AM Racing | 22 | Mason Maggio | Ryan London | 3 |
| Ford | AM Racing | 22 | Austin Wayne Self | Ryan London | 1 |
| Ford | AM Racing | 22 | Christian Rose | Ryan London | 2 |
| Ford | AM Racing | 22 | Jason M. White | Ryan London | 1 |
| Ford | Front Row Motorsports | 34 | Brett Moffitt | Seth Barbour | 1 |
| Ford | ThorSport Racing | 66 | Joey Logano | Bud Haefele | 1 |
| Ford | ThorSport Racing | 66 | Conner Jones | Bud Haefele | 9 |
| Ford | ThorSport Racing | 66 | Jake Drew | Bud Haefele | 1 |
| Toyota | Cook Racing Technologies | 84 | Clay Greenfield | Tucker Wingo | 1 |
| Toyota | G2G Racing | 46 | Norm Benning | Tim Silva | 1 |
| Toyota | G2G Racing | 46 | Brennan Poole | Tim Silva | 3 |
| Toyota | G2G Racing | 46 | Akinori Ogata | Tim Silva | 2 |
| Toyota | G2G Racing | 46 | Dale Quarterley | Tim Silva | 2 |
| Toyota | G2G Racing | 46 | Armani Williams | Tim Silva | 4 |
| Toyota | G2G Racing | 46 | Jerry Bohlman | Tim Silva | 2 (Note: At Richmond in July (race 16), Jerry Bohlman drove the No. 46 in practice but he was replaced by Memphis Villarreal for qualifying.) |
| Toyota | G2G Racing | 46 | Memphis Villarreal | Tim Silva | 3 |
| Toyota | Halmar Friesen Racing | 62 | Jessica Friesen | Tripp Bruce | 1 |
| Toyota | Hattori Racing Enterprises | 61 | Christopher Bell | Jon Leonard | 2 |
| Toyota | Hattori Racing Enterprises | 61 | Jake Drew | Jon Leonard | 5 |
| Toyota | Hattori Racing Enterprises | 61 | Sean Hingorani | Jon Leonard | 1 |
| Toyota | On Point Motorsports | 30 | Chris Hacker | Carol Hines | 4 |
| Toyota | On Point Motorsports | 30 | Ryan Vargas | Carol Hines | 7 |
| Toyota | On Point Motorsports | 30 | Colin Garrett | Carol Hines | 1 |
| Toyota | On Point Motorsports | 30 | Tanner Carrick | Carol Hines | 1 |
| Toyota | On Point Motorsports | 30 | Jonathan Shafer | Carol Hines | 3 |
| Toyota | On Point Motorsports | 30 | Brad Perez | Carol Hines | 1 |
| Toyota | Peck Motorsports | 96 | Todd Peck | Frank Fuhrman | 1 |
| Toyota | TC Motorsports | 90 | Justin Carroll | Terry Carroll | 6 |
| Toyota | Tricon Garage | 1 | Jason A. White | Seth Smith | 1 |
| Toyota | Tricon Garage | 1 | Kaz Grala | Seth Smith | 3 |
| Toyota | Tricon Garage | 1 | Layne Riggs | Seth Smith | 1 |
| Toyota | Tricon Garage | 1 | William Sawalich | Seth Smith | 6 |
| Toyota | Tricon Garage | 1 | Toni Breidinger | Seth Smith | 3 |
| Toyota | Tricon Garage | 1 | Bubba Wallace | Seth Smith | 2 |
| Toyota | Tricon Garage | 1 | David Gilliland | Seth Smith | 2 |
| Toyota | Tricon Garage | 1 | Jesse Love | Seth Smith | 2 |
| Ford | G2G Racing | 47 | Andrew Gordon | Tim Viens | 1 |
| Toyota | G2G Racing | 47 | Tim Viens | Memphis Villarreal | 1 |
| Toyota | G2G Racing | 47 | Dawson Cram | Dan Killius | 1 |
| Toyota 1 Chevrolet 1 | GK Racing | 95 | Clay Greenfield | Tucker Wingo | 2 |
| Toyota | Reaume Brothers Racing | 34 | Jason M. White | Dan Stillman 1 Pedro Lopez 3 Josh Reaume 1 John Reaume 4 Gregory Rayl 2 | 1 |
| Ford | Reaume Brothers Racing | 34 | Josh Reaume | Dan Stillman 1 Pedro Lopez 3 Josh Reaume 1 John Reaume 4 Gregory Rayl 2 | 3 |
| Ford | Reaume Brothers Racing | 34 | Keith McGee | Dan Stillman 1 Pedro Lopez 3 Josh Reaume 1 John Reaume 4 Gregory Rayl 2 | 3 |
| Ford | Reaume Brothers Racing | 34 | Mason Filippi | Dan Stillman 1 Pedro Lopez 3 Josh Reaume 1 John Reaume 4 Gregory Rayl 2 | 1 |
| Ford | Reaume Brothers Racing | 34 | Stephen Mallozzi | Dan Stillman 1 Pedro Lopez 3 Josh Reaume 1 John Reaume 4 Gregory Rayl 2 | 1 |
| Ford | Reaume Brothers Racing | 34 | Mason Maggio | Dan Stillman 1 Pedro Lopez 3 Josh Reaume 1 John Reaume 4 Gregory Rayl 2 | 1 |
| Ford | Reaume Brothers Racing | 34 | Caleb Costner | Dan Stillman 1 Pedro Lopez 3 Josh Reaume 1 John Reaume 4 Gregory Rayl 2 | 1 |
| Ford 15 Chevrolet 3 | Roper Racing | 04 | Kaden Honeycutt | Craig Roper 5 Bruce Cook 13 | 7 |
| Ford 15 Chevrolet 3 | Roper Racing | 04 | Johnny Sauter | Craig Roper 5 Bruce Cook 13 | 3 |
| Ford 15 Chevrolet 3 | Roper Racing | 04 | Cory Roper | Craig Roper 5 Bruce Cook 13 | 3 |
| Ford 15 Chevrolet 3 | Roper Racing | 04 | Landen Lewis | Craig Roper 5 Bruce Cook 13 | 2 |
| Ford 15 Chevrolet 3 | Roper Racing | 04 | Spencer Davis | Craig Roper 5 Bruce Cook 13 | 3 |

=== Changes ===
==== Teams ====
- On October 1, 2022, Bret Holmes stated in his post-race interview after the 2022 Chevrolet Silverado 250 that he and his team would like to run full-time in the Truck Series in 2023. On February 3, 2023, Holmes officially announced that he and his team would run full-time in 2023.
- On October 5, 2022, Kelly Crandall from RACER Magazine reported that David Gilliland Racing would field four full-time trucks in 2023 after a manufacturer switch from Ford to Toyota. DGR fielded three full-time trucks in 2022. The fourth truck would be for a rotation of Toyota development drivers. Toyota's development drivers have driven part-time in the Kyle Busch Motorsports No. 51 truck for several years, but KBM will switch from Toyota to Chevrolet in 2023 as a result of Kyle Busch's move from Joe Gibbs Racing to Richard Childress Racing in the Cup Series. On October 27, DGR officially announced their 2023 plans which included everything Crandall reported except for that the fourth truck for the development drivers (the No. 1) would be fielded part-time instead of full-time and that the team would also change its name to Tricon Garage. On December 5, Tricon announced that they would be adding a fourth full-time truck, the No. 5, making the part-time No. 1 truck a fifth truck for the team. Hill Motorsports, which used the No. 5 in 2022 for a second part-time truck for the team driven by Tyler Hill, will be giving up the number to Tricon. On January 17, 2023, Hill Motorsports announced that they would not field a part-time second truck in 2023 with a different number.
- On October 25, 2022, GMS Racing announced that they would be fielding a third full-time truck, the No. 43, driven by Daniel Dye. Team President Mike Beam stated that the team would be expanding their Truck Series program although the number of trucks the team will field in 2023 was not specified. Reaume Brothers Racing, which used the No. 43 in 2022, will be giving up the number to GMS. The team revealed on January 24, 2023 that they would renumber their No. 43 truck to the No. 34 (the number of that truck in 2021).
- On November 4, 2022, Kyle Busch Motorsports announced it would downsize from three truck teams to two in 2023: the No. 4 and the No. 51.
- On November 4, 2022, ARCA Menards Series team Rev Racing announced that they would expand into the Truck Series, fielding one full-time truck, the No. 2 driven by 2022 main ARCA Series champion Nick Sanchez, in an alliance with Kyle Busch Motorsports.
- On January 16, 2023, it was revealed that Hattori Racing Enterprises would only field one full-time truck in 2023, the No. 16 driven by Tyler Ankrum. The No. 61 truck, previously driven by Chase Purdy (who left to drive the KBM No. 4 truck), will only be fielded part-time in 2023. The driver lineup and which races it will be entered in have yet to be determined. On March 17, 2023, Hattori announced that Christopher Bell would drive the No. 61 truck in the race at North Wilkesboro, making his first Truck Series start since 2018.
- On March 27, 2023, a new team based in Pittsburgh, TriPoint Racing, announced that they plan to make their Truck Series debut in the race at Mid-Ohio, fielding the No. 37 truck. The team did not announce their driver, sponsor, crew chief and manufacturer at the time. The team ended up not entering the race at Mid-Ohio.
- On August 17, 2023, it was revealed that Dexter Bean would re-start his own team, BlackJack Racing, which he and his family fielded in the Cup Series in 2009, and would enter a truck in the race at Milwaukee in his home state of Wisconsin. Bean also ran the last Truck Series race there in 2009. That was also the last year he raced in the Truck Series.
- On October 26, 2023, Spire Motorsports announced that they would field a second truck, the No. 77, for the first time in the season-finale at Phoenix with Derek Kraus as the driver.

==== Drivers ====
- On October 5, 2022, it was announced that Chandler Smith, who drove the Kyle Busch Motorsports No. 18 truck full-time in 2021 and 2022, would leave to move up to the Xfinity Series full-time in 2023 to drive the Kaulig Racing No. 16 car (replacing A. J. Allmendinger, who would return to the Cup Series full-time in 2023 driving Kaulig's No. 16 Cup car).
- On October 5, 2022, Kelly Crandall from RACER Magazine reported that Corey Heim would move from Kyle Busch Motorsports, where he drove their No. 51 truck part-time in 2022, to David Gilliland Racing to run full-time in one of their trucks in 2023. DGR would also switch from Ford to Toyota and Heim would remain in Toyota's driver development system after KBM's switch from Toyota to Chevrolet. On October 27, 2022, DGR, which also announced its name change to Tricon Garage for 2023, officially announced that Heim would drive for the team full-time in their new No. 11 truck.
- On October 10, 2022, Chris Knight from Catchfence reported that 2022 ARCA Menards Series champion Nick Sanchez would likely drive for a Chevrolet team in the Truck Series in 2023. It would be Sanchez's debut in the Truck Series. On November 4, it was announced that Sanchez would drive full-time for Rev Racing (his ARCA team) which would expand into the Truck Series in 2023.
- On October 10, 2022, NASCAR Whelen Euro Series driver Thomas Krasonis announced that he would make his Truck Series debut in 2023. The team he will drive for has yet to be announced. He would be the first driver from Greece to compete in the series.
- On October 18, 2022, it was announced that Chase Purdy would not return to the Hattori Racing Enterprises No. 61 truck in 2023. On November 4, it was announced that Purdy would drive the No. 4 truck for Kyle Busch Motorsports in 2023, replacing John Hunter Nemechek.
- On October 25, 2022, GMS Racing announced that Daniel Dye, who drove for the team full-time in the main ARCA Series in 2022, would move up to the Truck Series full-time in 2023 for the team. He will drive a new third GMS truck, the No. 43, the same number he used for them in ARCA as well as Ben Kennedy Racing and in late model racing. The season-opener at Daytona was Dye's Truck Series debut.
- On October 27, 2022, David Gilliland Racing, which announced it would rename to Tricon Garage, announced that Taylor Gray would drive their No. 17 truck full-time in 2023 except for the first three races due to his 18th birthday not being until March 25. The first three races are at tracks where 17-year-old drivers cannot compete at as per NASCAR's age restriction policy. Gray drove the No. 17 truck part-time in 2021 and 2022.
- On October 27, 2022, it was announced that the David Gilliland Racing (Tricon Garage starting in 2023) No. 1 truck, which was driven full-time by Hailie Deegan in 2022, would become a part-time truck for the team in 2023 and would be driven by Toyota Racing Development drivers as part of the team's switch from Ford to Toyota. Deegan will not return to the rebranded team in 2023 as she has a contract with Ford as one of their development drivers. On January 19, 2023, Tricon announced that William Sawalich, the new driver of Joe Gibbs Racing's No. 18 ARCA car, would drive the No. 1 truck part-time in 2023.
- On November 4, 2022, Kyle Busch Motorsports announced that Jack Wood, who drove the No. 24 truck for GMS Racing full-time in 2022, would drive part-time in the team's No. 51 truck in 2023, sharing it with team owner Kyle Busch as well as other drivers to be named at a later time. On March 9, 2023, KBM announced that Hendrick Motorsports Cup Series driver William Byron would drive their No. 51 truck in three races. Byron drove full-time for the team in 2016 and is able to return to the team now that they switched to Chevrolet, which is Hendrick's manufacturer.
- On November 30, 2022, Colby Howard revealed to Joseph Srigley from TobyChristie.com that he would not return to the No. 91 truck for McAnally–Hilgemann Racing in 2023. He did get another full-time ride in the Truck Series with another team but did not announce which team it is. On February 7, 2023, it was announced that Howard would return to CR7 Motorsports to drive their No. 9 truck full-time in 2023, replacing Blaine Perkins, who moved up to the Xfinity Series full-time in 2023 driving the No. 07 car for SS-Green Light Racing. Howard drove the same truck part-time in 2021.
- On December 1, 2022, TobyChristie.com reported that Rajah Caruth would drive the No. 24 truck for GMS Racing in 2023, replacing Jack Wood, who left to drive the Kyle Busch Motorsports No. 51 truck part-time. It will be his first full-time season in the Truck Series. In 2022, Caruth drove part-time in the Truck Series in the No. 7 for Spire Motorsports, part-time in the Xfinity Series for Alpha Prime Racing and full-time in the ARCA Menards Series for Rev Racing.
- On December 5, 2022, Tricon Garage announced that Dean Thompson would drive for the team in 2023 in their new No. 5 truck. Thompson drove the No. 40 truck full-time for Niece Motorsports in 2022. Thompson was not replaced as Niece would cut back to three full-time trucks in 2023, with the No. 40 truck not being one of them.
- On December 6, 2022, McAnally–Hilgemann Racing announced that Christian Eckes, who previously drove the No. 98 truck for ThorSport Racing, would drive their No. 19 truck full-time in 2023, replacing Derek Kraus, and Jake Garcia, who drove part-time for the team in 2022, would drive their No. 35 truck in every race except the season-opener at Daytona due to his 18th birthday not coming until after that race.
- On December 6, 2022, Bob Pockrass from Fox reported that Hailie Deegan may replace Christian Eckes in ThorSport Racing's No. 98 truck in 2023. Eckes left the team to drive the No. 19 truck for McAnally–Hilgemann Racing. If this happens, ThorSport would also switch from Toyota back to Ford, their manufacturer from 2018 to 2020, as Deegan has a contract as a Ford development driver. Deegan lost her ride with David Gilliland Racing when that team (which renamed to Tricon Garage) switched from Ford to Toyota for 2023. On December 15, 2022, ThorSport Racing officially announced that Deegan would drive for them in 2023, replacing Eckes as a full-time driver on the team, but she would drive their No. 13 truck (which ran part-time in 2022 with Johnny Sauter) instead of the No. 98.
- On January 10, 2023, AM Racing announced that Christian Rose would drive full-time for the team in the main ARCA Series in 2023 in their No. 32 car as well as run part-time in the Truck Series for the team. It will be Rose's debut in the Truck Series. On June 8, the team announced that Rose's first Truck Series start would be at Richmond in their No. 22 truck.
- On January 17, 2023, it was announced that Ryan Vargas would drive the No. 30 truck for On Point Motorsports part-time in 2023 starting at Atlanta. Despite having competed in the Xfinity Series since 2019, it will be Vargas' Truck Series debut.
- On January 24, 2023, Reaume Brothers Racing announced that Mason Massey would drive full-time for them in 2023 in their No. 33 truck. In 2022, Massey drove all but six races in the DGM Racing No. 91 car in the Xfinity Series. He also drove part-time for RBR in the Truck Series in 2019. It is the first time RBR has ever had one driver run the full season in one of their trucks.
- On January 31, 2023, Roper Racing announced that Kaden Honeycutt would drive the No. 04 truck in the first six races of the season. Honeycutt ran part-time in the Truck Series for G2G Racing and On Point Motorsports in 2022. On April 19, Roper Racing announced that Johnny Sauter would replace Honeycutt.
- On February 1, 2023, it was announced that Derek Kraus, who lost his full-time ride in the McAnally-Hilgemann No. 19 truck to Christian Eckes for 2023, would drive the Young's Motorsports No. 20 truck in the season-opener at Daytona. He could run more races for the team if sponsorship is found. On March 11, it was announced that IndyCar driver Ed Jones would drive the No. 20 truck at COTA. It would be his debut in NASCAR and the Truck Series.
- On January 28, 2023, Dale Quarterley announced that he would attempt to qualify for the race at COTA after buying an old Toyota from Kyle Busch Motorsports, which switched to Chevrolet for 2023. He stated in an interview with Frontstretch that the plan is to drive for his own team, 1/4 Ley Racing, which he has fielded in ARCA although it is possible that he could partner with another team with owner points to have a better chance of qualifying for the race. It would be his and his team's debut in the Truck Series. On February 2, Tim Viens, the owner of G2G Racing, announced in an interview with TobyChristie.com that Quarterley would drive for his team in that race. He drove their No. 46 truck in that race as well as in the race at Mid-Ohio.
- On February 2, 2023, Tim Viens, the owner of G2G Racing, announced in an interview with TobyChristie.com that Memphis Villarreal would run seven races (the only one that has been announced so far is COTA) for his team in 2023, making his debut in NASCAR and Truck Series. Additionally, Viens announced that B. J. McLeod and Brennan Poole would drive for G2G at Las Vegas and Atlanta with one driver in the No. 46 truck and the other in the No. 47. Although Poole would drive the No. 46 at Las Vegas, the No. 47 truck was not entered into either race with McLeod and Poole was replaced by Akinori Ogata in the No. 46 for Atlanta.
- On February 8, 2023, Young's Motorsports announced that Kris Wright would return to the team in 2023, driving their No. 02 truck full-time. It is the same truck he drove for the majority of the 2021 season before he left to drive the No. 44 truck for Niece Motorsports in 2022. On May 30, the team announced that they had parted ways with Wright. Chris Hacker would drive the No. 02 truck at Gateway, moving over from the On Point Motorsports No. 30 truck which was withdrawn from the race after he got the ride in the No. 02. Layne Riggs drove the No. 02 truck at Nashville. On July 3, it was announced that Will Rodgers would drive the No. 02 truck at Mid-Ohio.
- On February 13, 2023, it was announced that Conner Jones would drive part-time for ThorSport Racing in 2023 in their No. 66 truck with Ty Majeski now driving the No. 98 truck full-time. Jones competed part-time in ARCA for Venturini Motorsports in 2022 and is doing so again in 2023 despite Venturini being a Toyota team and ThorSport now being a Ford team.
- On February 14, 2023, Johnny Sauter was replaced by Norm Benning in the No. 46 G2G Racing truck on the entry list for the season-opener at Daytona. The reason for the driver change is unknown.
- On May 8, 2023, Spire Motorsports revealed that Alex Bowman would not drive their No. 7 truck in the race at North Wilkesboro due to Bowman's injury in a sprint car race on April 25 that had been sidelining him from racing in the Cup Series at the time. On May 11, it was announced that Kyle Larson would fill in for Bowman, his Hendrick Motorsports Cup Series teammate, in the truck in that race.
- On July 3, 2023, Reaume Brothers Racing announced that Caleb Costner would attempt to make his Truck Series debut in the race at Mid-Ohio in their No. 34 truck. Costner has competed part-time in all three ARCA series since 2021.
- On August 2, 2023, Niece Motorsports announced that Shane van Gisbergen would be attempting to make his Truck Series debut, as well as his oval debut in NASCAR, in the race at Lucas Oil Indianapolis Raceway Park.
- On August 9, 2023, Young's Motorsports announced that Greg Van Alst would drive the No. 20 truck for the rest of the season, starting with his Truck Series debut in the race at Lucas Oil Indianapolis Raceway Park. On September 30, Van Alst was injured in a crash in the race at Talladega and had to be sent to the hospital. He would not recover in time for the races at Homestead-Miami and Phoenix and Nick Leitz would drive the No. 20 truck instead. (Leitz had been announced on May 1 to drive the No. 20 truck at Homestead-Miami and would likely have been moved to the team's No. 02 truck and driven it instead of Brad Perez if Van Alst was still able to race.)
- On August 17, 2023, NASCAR suspended Chris Hacker and Jason White indefinitely for violating Section 4.4. D. of the NASCAR Rule Book, stating actions detrimental to stock car racing - particularly on being charged with or convicted of significant criminal violations. Hacker was arrested on August 15 while White was arrested on August 3; both were charged with DWI.
- On September 19, 2023, after he was eliminated from the playoffs, Rackley W.A.R. removed Matt DiBenedetto from their No. 25 truck after the Bristol night race. DiBenedetto had already announced he would not be returning to the team in 2024. On September 26, Chandler Smith was announced as the driver of the No. 25 at Talladega. On October 17, the team announced that Trevor Bayne would drive the No. 25 truck at Homestead-Miami. On October 19, it was announced that Stefan Parsons would drive the No. 25 truck in the season-finale at Phoenix.
- On October 27, 2023, Henderson Motorsports announced that Sean Hingorani would drive their No. 75 truck in the season-finale at Phoenix. Hingorani will be driving a Chevrolet in this race despite being a Toyota development driver for Venturini Motorsports in the ARCA Series.

==== Crew chiefs ====
- On November 9, 2022, Kyle Busch Motorsports announced that Brian Pattie would be the new crew chief of the No. 51 truck in 2023. Pattie previously worked for JTG Daugherty Racing as the crew chief of Ricky Stenhouse Jr.'s No. 47 car in the Cup Series. He replaces Mardy Lindley, who was announced on November 17 to be moving to JR Motorsports to crew chief Sam Mayer's No. 1 car in the Xfinity Series in 2023.
- On November 14, 2022, Scott Zipadelli announced his departure as crew chief of the Hattori Racing Enterprises No. 16. He served as the truck's crew chief for six seasons and won one championship with Brett Moffitt in 2018. On January 13, 2023, Hattori announced that Doug Randolph would replace Zipadelli as crew chief of Ankrum's No. 16 truck. He previously was the crew chief of the No. 68 Brandonbilt Motorsports car in the Xfinity Series and prior to that was a crew chief in the Truck Series for Brad Keselowski Racing and GMS Racing.
- On December 6, 2022, it was announced that Chad Walter, who was the crew chief of the No. 27 Our Motorsports car driven by Jeb Burton in 2022, would be leaving for GMS Racing to crew chief the team's No. 24 truck driven by Rajah Caruth in the Truck Series in 2023. Walter is returning to GMS after having crew chiefed for the team in 2020 and 2021. He replaces Tom Ackerman, whose 2023 plans have yet to be announced.
- On December 6, 2022, GMS Racing announced that Travis Sharpe would be the crew chief for their new No. 43 truck driven by Daniel Dye in 2023. Sharpe previously worked for Bill McAnally Racing (whose Truck Series affiliate, McAnally–Hilgemann Racing, has had an alliance with GMS since 2022) and won the 2021 ARCA Menards Series West championship with Jesse Love. He has also crew chiefed Dye in late model racing.
- On December 7, 2022, Kyle Busch Motorsports announced that Jimmy Villeneuve would be the crew chief of their No. 4 truck driven by Chase Purdy in 2023, replacing Eric Phillips. He had been a truck chief for the team since 2017 and prior to that was a crew chief in the Truck Series for John Wes Townley's Athenian Motorsports No. 05 truck in 2016. On January 17, 2023, it was announced that Phillips would join Cup Series team 23XI Racing as the crew chief for their new part-time No. 67 car driven by Travis Pastrana in the 2023 Daytona 500.
- On December 7, 2022, it was announced that Danny Stockman Jr, who was the crew chief of the No. 18 truck for Kyle Busch Motorsports (which closed down in 2023) driven by Chandler Smith in 2022, would move to Rev Racing to crew chief their new Truck Series team which has an alliance with KBM. He will crew chief the No. 2 truck driven by Nick Sanchez.
- On December 15, 2022, ThorSport Racing revealed that Rich Lushes, who was the crew chief for their No. 99 truck driven by Ben Rhodes in 2021 (where they won the championship) and 2022, would be the crew chief for their No. 13 truck driven by Hailie Deegan in 2023. When it was announced that Deegan's number would be the No. 13, it was replacing the No. 98 truck in ThorSport's lineup of full-time trucks. Jeriod Prince, who was the crew chief of the No. 98 in 2022 (when it was driven by Christian Eckes), will move to the No. 99 to crew chief Rhodes in 2023. On February 13, 2023, it was announced that driver Ty Majeski and crew chief Joe Shear Jr's No. 66 truck would be renumbered to the No. 98 with the No. 66 becoming a part-time fifth ThorSport truck driven by Conner Jones in 2023.
- On February 3, 2023, it was announced that Jerry Baxter would be the crew chief for the No. 32 Bret Holmes Racing truck in 2023, replacing Shane Huffman. He previously crew chiefed for David Gilliland Racing (now Tricon Garage) on Tanner Gray's No. 15 truck and then Hailie Deegan's No. 1 truck in 2022. On March 3, it was announced that Huffman would be the crew chief and team manager for a new ARCA team, Pinnacle Racing Group, in 2023.
- On February 7, 2023, Niece Motorsports announced that Mike Hillman Jr. would be the crew chief of their No. 41 truck in 2023. He previously crew chiefed for David Gilliland Racing (now Tricon Garage) on Hailie Deegan's No. 1 truck and then Tanner Gray's No. 15 truck in 2022.
- On February 8, 2023, Tricon Garage (previously David Gilliland Racing) announced their 2023 crew chief lineup:
  - Scott Zipadelli, previously the crew chief of the No. 16 Hattori truck, will crew chief the team's new No. 11 truck driven by Corey Heim.
  - Jerame Donley, who crew chiefed the No. 42 Petty GMS Motorsports (now Legacy Motor Club) car in the Cup Series driven by Ty Dillon in 2022, will crew chief the No. 15 truck driven by Tanner Gray, replacing Mike Hillman Jr, who left to crew chief the Niece Motorsports No. 41 truck.
  - Billy Wilburn, who crew chiefed for Penske, Yates Racing and Petty Enterprises in the Cup Series in the 2000s, will crew chief the No. 17 truck, replacing Chad Johnston, who left to crew chief the Stewart-Haas Racing No. 41 car in the Cup Series.
  - Brothers Derek and Seth Smith return to the team with Derek crew chiefing the team's new No. 5 truck driven by Dean Thompson and Seth crew chiefing the team's No. 1 truck, replacing Jerry Baxter, who left to crew chief the Bret Holmes Racing No. 32 truck.
- On March 13, 2023, when the entry list for the race at Atlanta was released, Blake Bainbridge was listed as the crew chief of Stewart Friesen's No. 52 truck instead of Jon Leonard. During the race on March 18, color commentators Phil Parsons and Michael Waltrip confirmed that Bainbridge had replaced Leonard as the permanent crew chief of the No. 52 truck, stating that Halmar Friesen Racing wanted "something different- a fresh change".
- On October 26, 2023, Spire Motorsports announced that Andrew Overstreet would be the crew chief of their new No. 77 truck driven by Derek Kraus in the season-finale at Phoenix. He is the engineer for JR Motorsports' No. 1 car in the Xfinity Series driven by Sam Mayer. Overstreet also served as the interim crew chief for Mayer in 4 races in 2022 and 1 race in 2023.

==== Interim crew chiefs ====
- On March 21, 2023, NASCAR suspended Reaume Brothers Racing No. 33 truck crew chief Gregory Rayl for three races after the truck, driven by Mason Massey, lost its ballast during the race at Atlanta. Pedro Lopez was the interim crew chief for the No. 33 truck for the races at COTA, Texas and the Bristol dirt race.
- On August 29, 2023, NASCAR suspended ThorSport Racing No. 98 crew chief Joe Shear Jr. for four races and fined him US$25,000 after the truck, driven by Ty Majeski, was discovered to have an illegal right rear wheel and tire during the inspection prior to the 2023 Clean Harbors 175 at Milwaukee. In addition, the No. 98 team was docked 75 owner and driver points and 5 playoff points.

==== Manufacturers ====
- On September 14, 2022, it was announced that Kyle Busch Motorsports will switch from Toyota to Chevrolet due to team owner Kyle Busch leaving Joe Gibbs Racing (a Toyota team) to drive for Richard Childress Racing, a Chevrolet team, in the Cup Series. The drivers, sponsors and crew chiefs for KBM as well as how many trucks the team will field in 2023 have all yet to be determined.
- On October 5, 2022, Kelly Crandall from RACER Magazine reported that David Gilliland Racing would switch from Ford to Toyota in 2023. The team switched to Ford in 2020 after having previously been a Toyota team in 2018 and 2019. On October 27, DGR officially announced this manufacturer change as well as the team's rebranding to Tricon Garage in 2023.
- On December 15, 2022, ThorSport Racing announced that they would switch from Toyota back to Ford, their manufacturer from 2018 to 2020, in order for Ford development driver Hailie Deegan to drive their No. 13 truck in 2023. (She would replace Christian Eckes, who left the team to drive the No. 19 truck for McAnally–Hilgemann Racing.)
- On January 24, 2023, Reaume Brothers Racing announced that they would switch to Ford in 2023. It is the first time RBR has ever had one manufacturer for each race of the season. The team previously ran a mixture of Chevrolets and Toyotas in the Truck Series since their first season in 2018.

== Rule changes ==
- In Austin, there were no caution flags at the end of each stage. NASCAR added this rule to all road course races in the top three series for 2023 that are paired with Cup Series races.
- The Texas race, moved back to INDYCAR weekend for the first time since 2019, will join Mid-Ohio as races governed by standalone races. At Texas, the first stage of 77 laps is split with a controlled competition caution around Lap 35 with the same rules as pit stops at the end of the stage. The other two stages are 45 laps each.

== Schedule ==
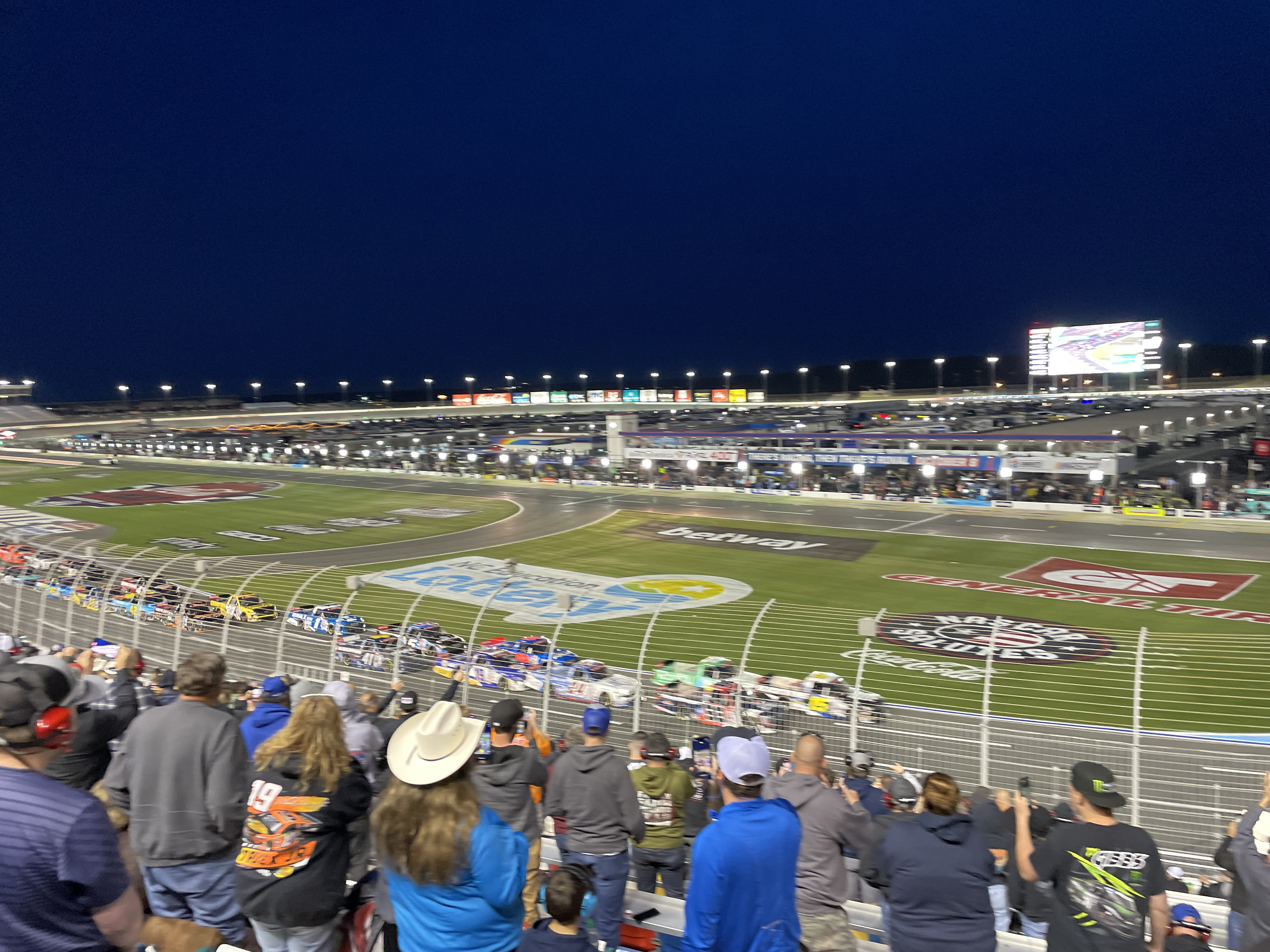
The North Carolina Education Lottery 200 at Charlotte Motor Speedway in May.

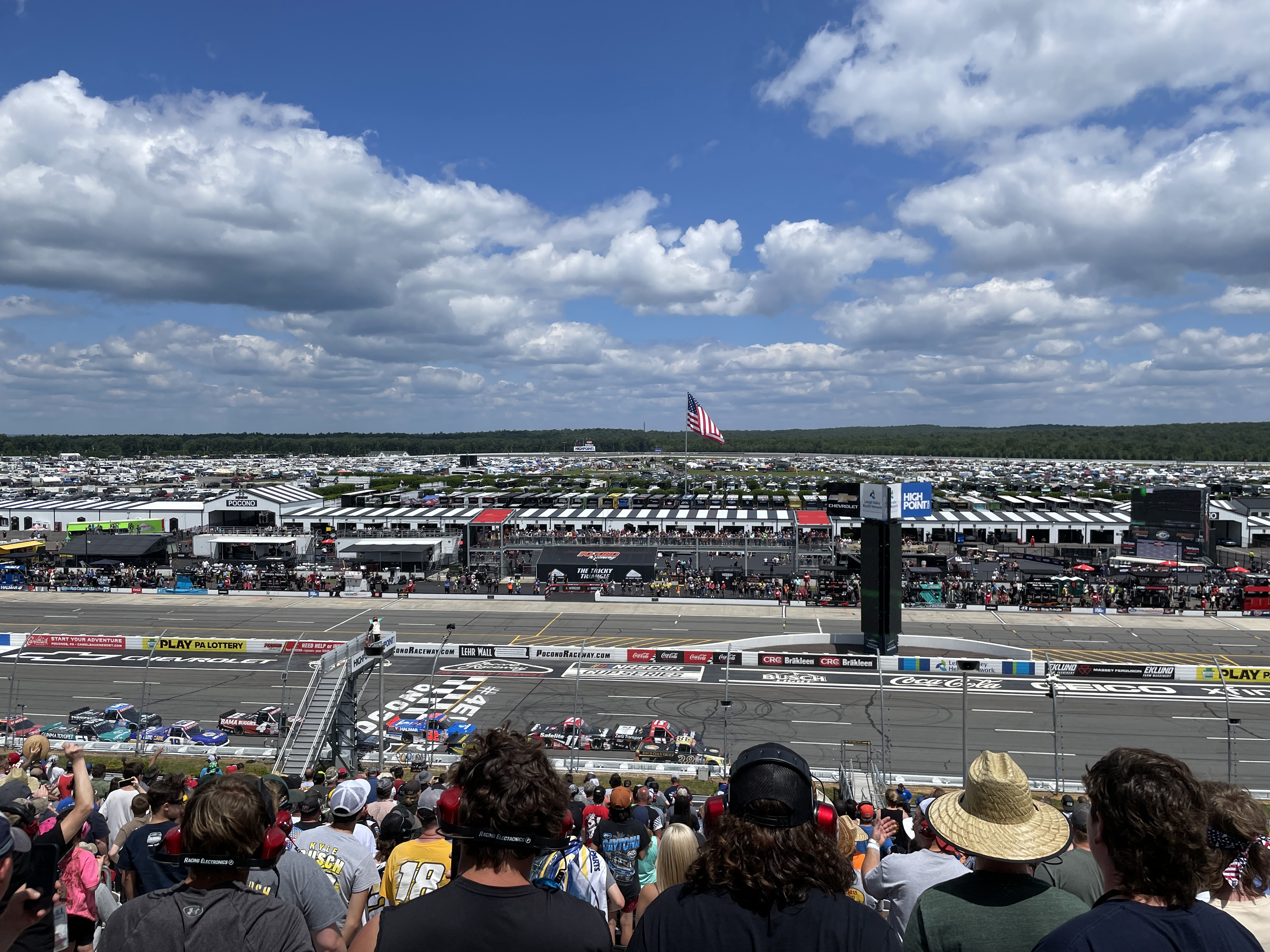
The CRC Brakleen 150 at Pocono Raceway in July.

The entire schedule was released on September 14, 2022.

- The Triple Truck Challenge races (Charlotte, World Wide Technology Raceway and Nashville) are listed in **bold**.

| No | Race title | Track | Location | Date |
|---|---|---|---|---|
| 1 | NextEra Energy 250 | Daytona International Speedway | Daytona Beach, Florida | February 17 |
| 2 | Victoria's Voice Foundation 200 | Las Vegas Motor Speedway | Las Vegas, Nevada | March 3 |
| 3 | Fr8 208 | Atlanta Motor Speedway | Hampton, Georgia | March 18 |
| 4 | XPEL 225 | Circuit of the Americas | Austin, Texas | March 25 |
| 5 | SpeedyCash.com 250 | Texas Motor Speedway | Fort Worth, Texas | April 1 |
| 6 | Weather Guard Truck Race on Dirt | Bristol Motor Speedway (Dirt) | Bristol, Tennessee | April 8 |
| 7 | Long John Silver's 200 | Martinsville Speedway | Ridgeway, Virginia | April 14 |
| 8 | Heart of America 200 | Kansas Speedway | Kansas City, Kansas | May 6 |
| 9 | Buckle Up South Carolina 200 | Darlington Raceway | Darlington, South Carolina | May 12 |
| 10 | Tyson 250 | North Wilkesboro Speedway | North Wilkesboro, North Carolina | May 20 |
| 11 | **North Carolina Education Lottery 200** | Charlotte Motor Speedway | Concord, North Carolina | May 26 |
| 12 | **Toyota 200 presented by CK Power** | World Wide Technology Raceway | Madison, Illinois | June 3 |
| 13 | **Rackley Roofing 200** | Nashville Superspeedway | Lebanon, Tennessee | June 23 |
| 14 | O'Reilly Auto Parts 150 at Mid-Ohio | Mid-Ohio Sports Car Course | Lexington, Ohio | July 8 |
| 15 | CRC Brakleen 150 | Pocono Raceway | Long Pond, Pennsylvania | July 22 |
| 16 | Worldwide Express 250 for Carrier Appreciation | Richmond Raceway | Richmond, Virginia | July 29 |
NASCAR Craftsman Truck Series Playoffs
Round of 10
| 17 | TSport 200 | Lucas Oil Indianapolis Raceway Park | Brownsburg, Indiana | August 11 |
| 18 | Clean Harbors 175 | Milwaukee Mile | West Allis, Wisconsin | August 27 |
| 19 | Kansas Lottery 200 | Kansas Speedway | Kansas City, Kansas | September 8 |
Round of 8
| 20 | UNOH 200 presented by Ohio Logistics | Bristol Motor Speedway | Bristol, Tennessee | September 14 |
| 21 | Love's RV Stop 250 | Talladega Superspeedway | Lincoln, Alabama | September 30 |
| 22 | Baptist Health Cancer Care 200 | Homestead-Miami Speedway | Homestead, Florida | October 21 |
Championship 4
| 23 | Craftsman 150 | Phoenix Raceway | Avondale, Arizona | November 3 |

=== Broadcasting ===
Fox would air the entirety of the schedule on television in 2023. It would be the second-to-last year of their contract to broadcast the Truck Series on television, which would go through 2024.

Vince Welch, who had been the play-by-play announcer for the Truck Series since 2016, tweeted on December 31, 2022 that he would not be back with Fox in 2023. Fox would rotate between Xfinity Series lead Adam Alexander and ARCA lead Jamie Little.

== Results and standings ==
=== Race results ===
| No. | Race | Pole position | Most laps led | Winning driver | Manufacturer | No. | Winning team | Report |
|---|---|---|---|---|---|---|---|---|
| 1 | NextEra Energy 250 | Nick Sanchez | Christian Eckes; Corey LaJoie (Note: Eckes and LaJoie both led 19 laps.) | Zane Smith | Ford | 38 | Front Row Motorsports | Report |
| 2 | Victoria's Voice Foundation 200 | Kyle Busch | Kyle Busch | Kyle Busch | Chevrolet | 51 | Kyle Busch Motorsports | Report |
| 3 | Fr8 208 | Zane Smith | John Hunter Nemechek | Christian Eckes | Chevrolet | 19 | McAnally–Hilgemann Racing | Report |
| 4 | XPEL 225 | Ross Chastain | Zane Smith | Zane Smith | Ford | 38 | Front Row Motorsports | Report |
| 5 | SpeedyCash.com 250 | Nick Sanchez | Nick Sanchez | Carson Hocevar | Chevrolet | 42 | Niece Motorsports | Report |
| 6 | Weather Guard Truck Race on Dirt | Zane Smith | Joey Logano | Joey Logano | Ford | 66 | ThorSport Racing | Report |
| 7 | Long John Silver's 200 | Zane Smith | Corey Heim | Corey Heim | Toyota | 11 | Tricon Garage | Report |
| 8 | Heart of America 200 | Christian Eckes | Grant Enfinger | Grant Enfinger | Chevrolet | 23 | GMS Racing | Report |
| 9 | Buckle Up South Carolina 200 | Corey Heim | Christian Eckes | Christian Eckes | Chevrolet | 19 | McAnally–Hilgemann Racing | Report |
| 10 | Tyson 250 | Corey Heim | Kyle Larson | Kyle Larson | Chevrolet | 7 | Spire Motorsports | Report |
| 11 | North Carolina Education Lottery 200 | Tanner Gray | Corey Heim | Ben Rhodes | Ford | 99 | ThorSport Racing | Report |
| 12 | Toyota 200 presented by CK Power | Ty Majeski | Grant Enfinger | Grant Enfinger | Chevrolet | 23 | GMS Racing | Report |
| 13 | Rackley Roofing 200 | Nick Sanchez | Corey Heim | Carson Hocevar | Chevrolet | 42 | Niece Motorsports | Report |
| 14 | O'Reilly Auto Parts 150 at Mid-Ohio | Corey Heim | Corey Heim | Corey Heim | Toyota | 11 | Tricon Garage | Report |
| 15 | CRC Brakleen 150 | Nick Sanchez | Corey Heim | Kyle Busch | Chevrolet | 51 | Kyle Busch Motorsports | Report |
| 16 | Worldwide Express 250 | Ty Majeski | Ty Majeski | Carson Hocevar | Chevrolet | 42 | Niece Motorsports | Report |
NASCAR Craftsman Truck Series Playoffs
Round of 10
| 17 | TSport 200 | Christian Eckes | Ty Majeski | Ty Majeski | Ford | 98 | ThorSport Racing | Report |
| 18 | Clean Harbors 175 | Grant Enfinger | Grant Enfinger | Grant Enfinger | Chevrolet | 23 | GMS Racing | Report |
| 19 | Kansas Lottery 200 | Chase Purdy | Nick Sanchez | Christian Eckes | Chevrolet | 19 | McAnally–Hilgemann Racing | Report |
Round of 8
| 20 | UNOH 200 | Christian Eckes | Christian Eckes | Corey Heim | Toyota | 11 | Tricon Garage | Report |
| 21 | Love's RV Stop 250 | Chase Purdy | Nick Sanchez | Brett Moffitt | Ford | 34 | Front Row Motorsports | Report |
| 22 | Baptist Health Cancer Care 200 | Nick Sanchez | Corey Heim | Carson Hocevar | Chevrolet | 42 | Niece Motorsports | Report |
Championship 4
| 23 | Craftsman 150 | Corey Heim | Ty Majeski | Christian Eckes | Chevrolet | 19 | McAnally–Hilgemann Racing | Report |

=== Drivers' championship ===
(key) Bold – Pole position awarded by time. Italics – Pole position set by competition-based formula. * – Most laps led. ^{1} – Stage 1 winner. ^{2} – Stage 2 winner. ^{1-10} – Regular season top 10 finishers.
. – Eliminated after Round of 10 . – Eliminated after Round of 8

| Pos. | Driver | DAY | LVS | ATL | COA | TEX | BRD | MAR | KAN | DAR | NWS | CLT | GTW | NSH | MOH | POC | RCH | IRP | MLW | KAN | BRI | TAL | HOM | PHO | Pts. | Stage | Bonus |
|---|---|---|---|---|---|---|---|---|---|---|---|---|---|---|---|---|---|---|---|---|---|---|---|---|---|---|---|
| 1 | Ben Rhodes | 11 | 3 | 5 | 10 | 10 | 19 | 6 | 16 | 18 | 33 | 1 | 7 | 9 | 5^{1} | 9 | 12 | 16 | 16 | 25 | 7 | 2 | 2 | 5 | 4032 | – | 13^{4} |
| 2 | Grant Enfinger | 5 | 9 | 19 | 12 | 17 | 5 | 14 | 1* | 14 | 10 | 5 | 1*^{1} | 13 | 11 | 5 | 9 | 12 | **1***^{12} | 17 | 3 | 13 | 4 | 6 | 4031 | – | 24^{5} |
| 3 | Carson Hocevar | 12 | 7^{2} | 31 | 34 | 1 | 17 | 34 | 31 | 5 | 4 | 4^{2} | 4 | 1 | 12 | 11 | 1 | 4 | 2 | 6^{2} | 4 | 11 | 1 | 29 | 4008 | – | 22^{7} |
| 4 | Corey Heim | 8 | 4 | 34 | 6 | 7 | 15 | 1*^{12} | 2 | **8** | **6**^{1} | 2*^{1} | | 4*^{2} | **1*** | 2* | 6 | 8 | 4 | 4 | 1 | 5 | 3*^{12} | **18***^{2} | 3994 | – | 30^{1} |
NASCAR Craftsman Truck Series Playoffs cut-off
| Pos. | Driver | DAY | LVS | ATL | COA | TEX | BRD | MAR | KAN | DAR | NWS | CLT | GTW | NSH | MOH | POC | RCH | IRP | MLW | KAN | BRI | TAL | HOM | PHO | Pts. | Stage | Bonus |
| 5 | Christian Eckes | 3*^{1} | 6 | 1^{1} | 30^{1} | 15 | 30 | 15 | **30** | 1*^{1} | 25 | 6 | 2 | 23 | 3 | 7 | 11 | **2** | 3 | 1 | **2***^{12} | 19 | 20 | 1 | 2319 | 36 | 26^{6} |
| 6 | Nick Sanchez **(R)** | **26** | 30 | 2 | 7 | **16***^{12} | 18 | 11 | 6 | 11 | 30 | 9 | 8 | **3** | 9 | **19** | 8 | 11 | 24 | 8*^{1} | 9 | 7*^{1} | **17** | 10 | 2258 | 45 | 7^{8} |
| 7 | Zane Smith | 1 | 2^{1} | 20 | 1* | 14 | **21** | **3** | 3 | 22 | 32 | 23 | 20 | 2^{1} | 2 | 34^{12} | 3 | 5 | 12 | 5 | 24 | 32 | 34 | 25 | 2194 | 32 | 22^{3} |
| 8 | Ty Majeski | 6 | 5 | 11 | 3 | 4 | 2 | 4 | 25^{2} | 31 | 2 | 7 | **30** | 31 | 7^{2} | 6 | **2***^{12} | 1*^{12} | 7 | 18 | 19 | 21 | 9 | 14*^{1} | 2185 | 55 | 16^{2} |
| 9 | Matt Crafton | 9 | 11 | 9^{2} | 33 | 13 | 4 | 26 | 11 | 12 | 7 | 12 | 25 | 15 | 6 | 14 | 7 | 9 | 5 | 33 | 16 | 24 | 7 | 11 | 2167 | 11 | 2^{10} |
| 10 | Matt DiBenedetto | 20 | 12 | 6 | 29 | 32 | 10 | 7 | 29 | 25 | 3 | 8 | 6 | 7 | 8 | 10 | 17 | 10 | 27 | 3 | 10 | | | | 2102 | 2 | 2^{9} |
| 11 | Chase Purdy | 17 | 8 | 7 | 27 | 2 | 28 | 10 | 33 | 32 | 8 | 16 | 5 | 6 | 13 | 18 | 22 | 14 | 6 | **14** | 8 | **28** | 10 | 3 | 582 | 76 | – |
| 12 | Stewart Friesen | 28 | 14 | 22 | 14 | 3 | 23 | 31 | 4 | 2 | 13 | 22 | 3^{2} | 18 | 4 | 32 | 27 | 30 | 30 | 7 | 14 | 34 | 6 | 24 | 537 | 86 | 1 |
| 13 | Jake Garcia **(R)** | | 10 | 18 | 19 | 5 | 6 | 13 | 8 | 26 | 23 | 15 | 10 | 10 | 16 | 35 | 4 | 13 | 9 | 11 | 11 | 29 | 15 | 2 | 534 | 28 | – |
| 14 | Tanner Gray | 2 | 13 | 24 | 8 | 27 | 8 | 5 | 18 | 3 | 18 | **27** | 21 | 11 | 20 | 36 | 16 | 15 | 11 | 26 | 29 | 25 | 11 | 9 | 533 | 65 | – |
| 15 | Taylor Gray **(R)** | | | | 11 | 24 | 34 | 8 | 9 | 21 | 21 | 10 | 13 | 14 | 15 | 3 | 14 | 20 | 13 | 2 | 5 | 18 | 13 | 23 | 490 | 41 | – |
| 16 | Rajah Caruth **(R)** | 29 | 29 | 25 | 13 | 19 | 11 | 25 | 34 | 6 | 34 | 11 | 15 | 32 | 29 | 16 | 19 | 7 | 14 | 12 | 6 | 12 | 8 | 12 | 482 | 49 | – |
| 17 | Tyler Ankrum | 7^{2} | 15 | 26 | 4 | 26 | 33 | 27 | 10 | 15 | 26 | 28 | 16 | 8 | 10 | 12 | 13 | 34 | 20 | 9 | 23 | 33 | 25 | 22 | 456 | 47 | 1 |
| 18 | Daniel Dye **(R)** | 30 | 19 | 16 | 18 | 25 | 22 | 30 | 13 | 19 | 14 | 19 | 11 | 22 | 14 | 17 | 21 | 22 | 28 | 23 | 21 | 6 | 21 | 32 | 389 | 2 | – |
| 19 | Hailie Deegan | 35 | 32 | 12 | 16 | 6 | 13 | 20 | 12 | 20 | 20 | 33 | 32 | 28 | 26 | 13 | 15 | 31 | 22 | 30 | 17 | 8 | 28 | 15 | 385 | 18 | – |
| 20 | Dean Thompson | 36 | 16 | 30 | 35 | 28 | 12 | 21 | 32 | 9 | 35 | 3 | 34 | 33 | 33 | 8 | 25 | 32 | 15 | 15 | 35 | 3 | 16 | 7 | 370 | 32 | – |
| 21 | Colby Howard | 4 | 18 | 27 | 24 | 20 | 27 | 17 | 35 | 17 | 24 | 20 | 12 | 29 | 36 | 15 | 24 | 35 | 17 | 19 | 22 | 23 | 30 | 21 | 340 | 15 | – |
| 22 | Lawless Alan | DNQ | 20 | 32 | 17 | 18 | DNQ | 32 | 17 | 30 | 19 | 17 | 22 | 36 | 17 | 27 | 28 | 24 | 21 | 22 | 28 | 10 | 19 | 13 | 317 | 9 | – |
| 23 | Bret Holmes **(R)** | 31 | 34 | 13 | 23 | 23 | 20 | 22 | 14 | 23 | 15 | 21 | 14 | 34 | 32 | 29 | 29 | 25 | 19 | 20 | 27 | 16 | | | 303 | 10 | – |
| 24 | Bayley Currey | | | 4 | | | | | | | | 13 | 17 | 5 | | | 18 | | 10 | 21 | 13 | 31 | 5 | 31 | 260 | 21 | – |
| 25 | Timmy Hill | 16 | 22 | 8 | 25 | | 25 | 19 | | 24 | 31 | | 18 | 16 | 21 | | 23 | | | 24 | 26 | | | | 222 | 2 | – |
| 26 | Jack Wood | 27 | | 10 | | 9 | | | | | | 18 | 29 | 30 | 31 | | | 18 | | 16 | 36 | 14 | 12 | 27 | 198 | 4 | – |
| 27 | Kaden Honeycutt | DNQ | 25 | 33 | 15 | Wth | 9 | 28 | | 10 | 17 | | | | | 20 | | | | 27 | 25 | | | 8 | 190 | 10 | – |
| 28 | Spencer Boyd | DNQ | 23 | 21 | 32 | 22 | 16 | 23 | 26 | 33 | 27 | 31 | 26 | 25 | 25 | 25 | 35 | 33 | 32 | 31 | 31 | DNQ | 33 | DNQ | 165 | – | – |
| 29 | Kris Wright | 22 | 28 | 15 | 21 | 12 | 32 | 16 | 28 | 29 | 22 | 32 | | | | | | | | | | | | | 150 | – | – |
| 30 | William Sawalich | | | | | | | 9 | | | | | | | 27 | | 10 | 6 | 26 | | 30 | | | | 138 | 24 | – |
| 31 | Jake Drew | | | | | | | | | | | | | 12 | | | | 17 | | 10 | 20 | 20 | | 33 | 116 | 6 | – |
| 32 | Ryan Vargas | | | 14 | | 8 | | | | 27 | | 26 | | | 23 | | 30 | | | | | 17 | | | 114 | – | – |
| 33 | Conner Jones | | | | | | | 18 | | | 29 | | 33 | | 28 | | 20 | 27 | 18 | | 15 | | | 34 | 111 | – | – |
| 34 | Matt Mills | | 26 | | | 31 | | | | | | 30 | 19 | | 22 | | 5 | 23 | 25 | | | | | | 108 | 3 | – |
| 35 | Tyler Hill | | | | | Wth | | | 22 | | | 24 | | | | 21 | | 26 | 29 | | | 30 | 22 | 20 | 102 | – | – |
| 36 | Josh Reaume | 19 | 35 | 23 | | 21 | DNQ | Wth | 24 | DNQ | DNQ | 29 | 23 | | DNQ | 26 | 36 | DNQ | 33 | | | | | | 101 | – | – |
| 37 | Jesse Love | | | | | | | | | | | | 9 | | | | | | | 13 | | | | 4 | 85 | – | – |
| 38 | Toni Breidinger | | | | | | | | 15 | | | | 24 | 17 | | | | | | | | | | | 55 | – | – |
| 39 | Mason Maggio | | | 35 | | | | | 27 | | | 25 | | 20 | | | | | | 35 | | | 27 | | 53 | – | – |
| 40 | Cory Roper | | | | | | | | | | | | | 21 | | 23 | | | | | | 22 | | | 45 | – | – |
| 41 | Nick Leitz | | | | | | | | 21 | | | | | 19 | | | | | | | | | 23 | 19 | 41 | – | – |
| 42 | Marco Andretti | | | | | | | | | | | | | | 19 | | | | | | | | 18 | 35 | 39 | – | – |
| 43 | David Gilliland | | | | | | | | | | | 14 | | | | | | | | | | 35 | | | 32 | 7 | – |
| 44 | Jonathan Shafer | | | | | | | 29 | | | | | | 24 | | | | | | | | | 26 | | 32 | – | – |
| 45 | Chris Hacker | 25 | | | | | | | | | 12 | | 27 | | | | | 29 | | | | | | 36 | 31 | – | – |
| 46 | Logan Bearden | | | | 22 | | | | | | | | | | | | | 21 | | | | | | | 31 | – | – |
| 47 | Justin Carroll | | | | | | | DNQ | 23 | | | 34 | | | | | 31 | | | 29 | DNQ | | | | 31 | – | – |
| 48 | Johnny Sauter | | | | | | | | 19 | 28 | 36 | | | | | | | | | | | | | | 28 | – | – |
| 49 | Memphis Villarreal | | | | | | | 24 | | | | | | 35 | | | QL | | | | 33 | | 29 | | 27 | – | – |
| 50 | Christian Rose | | | | | | | | | | | | | | | | 32 | | | | | | | 16 | 26 | – | – |
| 51 | Spencer Davis | | | | | | | | | | | | | | | | | | | 36 | | | 32 | 17 | 26 | – | – |
| 52 | Jason M. White | 21 | | | | | | | | | | | | | | | | | | | | 27 | | | 26 | – | – |
| 53 | Sean Hingorani | | | | | | | | | | | | | | | | | | 23 | | | | | 26 | 25 | – | – |
| 54 | Stephen Mallozzi | | | | | | | 36 | | | | | 31 | | | 24 | | | | | 32 | | | | 25 | – | – |
| 55 | Greg Van Alst | | | | | | | | | | | | | | | | | 36 | 34 | 32 | 34 | 26 | | | 23 | – | – |
| 56 | Jason A. White | 15 | | | | | | | | | | | | | | | | | | | | | | | 22 | – | – |
| 57 | Norm Benning | DNQ | | | | | 24 | | | | DNQ | | 28 | | | DNQ | | | | | | | | | 22 | – | – |
| 58 | Landen Lewis | | | | | | | | | | | | | | 24 | | | 28 | | | | | | | 22 | – | – |
| 59 | Akinori Ogata | | | 17 | | | | | | | Wth | | | | | | | | | | | | | | 20 | – | – |
| 60 | Chase Janes | | | | | | | | | | | | | 26 | | | | | | 28 | | | | | 20 | – | – |
| 61 | Conor Daly | | | | | | | | | | | | | | 18 | | | | | | | | | | 19 | – | – |
| 62 | Will Rodgers | | | | | | | | | | | | | | 34 | | 26 | | | | | | | | 19 | 5 | – |
| 63 | Shane van Gisbergen | | | | | | | | | | | | | | | | | 19 | | | | | | | 18 | – | – |
| 64 | Colin Garrett | | | | 20 | | | | | | | | | | | | | | | | | | | | 17 | – | – |
| 65 | Max Gutiérrez | | 21 | | | | | | | | | | | | | | | | | | | | | | 16 | – | – |
| 66 | Armani Williams | | | | | 29 | | | | | | 35 | | | | | | DNQ | | | | | 31 | | 16 | – | – |
| 67 | Mason Filippi | | | | 26 | | | | | | | | | | | | | | | | | | | | 11 | – | – |
| 68 | Tanner Carrick | | | | | | 26 | | | | | | | | | | | | | | | | | | 11 | – | – |
| 69 | Dale Quarterley | | | | 28 | | | | | | | | | | 35 | | | | | | | | | | 11 | – | – |
| 70 | Austin Wayne Self | | | | | | | | | | | | | | 30 | | | | | | | | | | 10 | 3 | – |
| 71 | Derek Lemke | | | | | | | | | | | | | | | | 33 | | 31 | | | | | | 10 | – | – |
| 72 | Derek Kraus | 18^{‡} | | | | | | | | | | | | | | | | | 8^{‡} | | | | | 28 | 9 | – | – |
| 73 | Tyler Carpenter | | | | | | 29 | | | | | | | | | | | | | | | | | | 8 | – | – |
| 74 | Stefan Parsons | | | | QL^{†} | | 36^{±} | | | | | | | | | 28^{±} | | | | | | | | 30 | 7 | – | – |
| 75 | Trey Hutchens | | | | | 30 | | | | | | | | DNQ | | | DNQ | | | | | | | | 7 | – | – |
| 76 | Keith McGee | | | 36 | | 33 | | | | | | 36 | | | | | | | | | | DNQ | | DNQ | 6 | – | – |
| 77 | Clay Greenfield | 34 | | | | | | | | | | | 35 | | | | | | | | | DNQ | | | 5 | – | – |
| 78 | Codie Rohrbaugh | 33 | | | | | | | | | | | | | | | | | | | | | | | 4 | – | – |
| 79 | Chad Chastain | | | | | 34 | | | | | | | | | | DNQ | | DNQ | | | | | | | 3 | – | – |
| 80 | Jennifer Jo Cobb | | | | | | | | | | | | | | | | | | | 34 | | DNQ | | | 3 | – | – |
| 81 | Ed Jones | | | | 36 | | | | | | | | | | | | | | | | | | | | 1 | – | – |
| 82 | Tim Viens | | | | | | | | 36 | | | | | | | | | | | | | | | | 1 | – | – |
| 83 | Bryan Dauzat | DNQ | | | | | | | | | | | | | | DNQ | | | | | | 36 | | | 1 | – | – |
| | Todd Peck | DNQ | | | | | | | | | | | | | | | | | | | | | | | 0 | – | – |
| | Samuel LeComte | | | | DNQ | | | | | | | | | | | | | | | | | | | | 0 | – | – |
| | Jerry Bohlman | | | | | | DNQ | | | | | | | | | | DNQ | | | | | | | | 0 | – | – |
| | Jessica Friesen | | | | | | DNQ | | | | | | | | | | | | | | | | | | 0 | – | – |
| | Caleb Costner | | | | | | | | | | | | | | DNQ | | | | | | | | | | 0 | – | – |
| | Danny Bohn | | | | | | | | | | | | | | | | | | | | DNQ | | | | 0 | – | – |
Ineligible for Craftsman Truck championship points
| Pos. | Driver | DAY | LVS | ATL | COA | TEX | BRD | MAR | KAN | DAR | NWS | CLT | GTW | NSH | MOH | POC | RCH | IRP | MLW | KAN | BRI | TAL | HOM | PHO | Pts. | Stage | Bonus |
| | Kyle Busch | | **1*** | | 2^{2} | | | 2 | 7^{1} | | | | | | | 1 | | | | | | | | | | | |
| | Joey Logano | | | | | | 1*^{12} | | | | | | | | | | | | | | | | | | | | |
| | Kyle Larson | | | | | | | | | | 1*^{2} | | | | | | | | | | | | | | | | |
| | Brett Moffitt | | | | | | | | | | | | | | | | | | | | | 1 | | | | | |
| | William Byron | | | | | | 3 | | | 4^{2} | 11 | | | | | | | | | | | | | | | | |
| | John Hunter Nemechek | | 31 | 3* | | | | | | | | | | | | | | | | | | | | | | | |
| | Layne Riggs | | | 28 | | | | | | | | | | 27 | | | | 3 | | | | | | | | | |
| | Christopher Bell | | | | | | | | | | 16 | | | | | 4 | | | | | | | | | | | |
| | Chandler Smith | | | | | | | | | | | | | | | | | | | | | 4 | | | | | |
| | Ross Chastain | | 24 | | **5** | | | 12 | 5 | 13 | 9 | | | | | 30 | | | | | | | | | | | |
| | Bubba Wallace | | | | | | | | | 7 | 5 | | | | | | | | | | | | | | | | |
| | Chase Briscoe | | | | | | 7 | | | | | | | | | | | | | | | | | | | | |
| | Kaz Grala | | 17 | | 9 | | | | | | | | | | | 31 | | | | | | | | | | | |
| | Parker Kligerman | 32 | | | 31 | | 31 | | | 34 | DNQ | | | | | 22 | | | | | 18 | 9^{2} | | | | | |
| | Chase Elliott | 10 | | | | | | | | | | | | | | | | | | | | | | | | | |
| | Mason Massey | 24 | 27 | 29 | DNQ | 11 | 35 | 33 | | | | | | | | | 34 | | | | | | | | | | |
| | Carson Kvapil | | | | | | | | | | | | | | | | | | | | 12 | | | | | | |
| | Travis Pastrana | 13 | | | | | | | | | | | | | | | | | | | | | | | | | |
| | Sammy Smith | 14 | | | | | | | | | | | | | | | | | | | | | | | | | |
| | Jonathan Davenport | | | | | | 14 | | | | | | | | | | | | | | | | | | | | |
| | Trevor Bayne | | | | | | | | | | | | | | | | | | | | | | 14 | | | | |
| | Garrett Smithley | | | | | | | | | | | | | | | | | | | | | 15 | | | | | |
| | Corey LaJoie | 23* | | | | | | | | 16 | | | | | | | | | | | | | | | | | |
| | Brennan Poole | | 33 | | | | | | 20 | 36 | | | | | | | | | | | | | | | | | |
| | Brad Perez | | | | | | | 35 | | | | | | | | | | | 35 | | | | 24 | | | | |
| | Josh Williams | | | | | | | | | | 28 | | | | | | | | | | | | | | | | |
| | Austin Hill | | | | | | | | | | | | | | | 33 | | | | | | | | | | | |
| | Dawson Cram | | | | | | | | | 35 | | | | | | | | | | | | | | | | | |
| | Josh Bilicki | | | | | | | | | | | | | | | | | | 36 | | | | | | | | |
| | Alex Bowman | | | | DNQ | | | | | | | | | | | | | | | | | | | | | | |
| | Andrew Gordon | | | | | | DNQ | | | | | | | | | | | | | | | | | | | | |
| | Dexter Bean | | | | | | | | | | | | | | | | | | DNQ | | | | | | | | |
| Pos. | Driver | DAY | LVS | ATL | COA | TEX | BRD | MAR | KAN | DAR | NWS | CLT | GTW | NSH | MOH | POC | RCH | IRP | MLW | KAN | BRI | TAL | HOM | PHO | Pts. | Stage | Bonus |
^{†} – Stefan Parsons practiced and qualified for Spencer Boyd at COTA due to Boyd's plane flight to the track being delayed.^{‡} – Derek Kraus started to receive points at Phoenix.^{±} Stefan Parsons started to receive points at Phoenix.

=== Owners' championship (Top 15) ===
(key) Bold – Pole position awarded by time. Italics – Pole position set by competition-based formula. * – Most laps led. ^{1} – Stage 1 winner. ^{2} – Stage 2 winner. ^{1-10} – Regular season top 10 finishers.
. – Eliminated after Round of 10 . – Eliminated after Round of 8

| Pos. | No. | Truck Owner | DAY | LVS | ATL | COA | TEX | BRD | MAR | KAN | DAR | NWS | CLT | GTW | NSH | MOH | POC | RCH | IRP | MLW | KAN | BRI | TAL | HOM | PHO | Points | Bonus |
|---|---|---|---|---|---|---|---|---|---|---|---|---|---|---|---|---|---|---|---|---|---|---|---|---|---|---|---|
| 1 | 99 | Duke Thorson | 11 | 3 | 5 | 10 | 10 | 19 | 6 | 16 | 17 | 33 | 1 | 7 | 9 | 5^{1} | 9 | 12 | 16 | 16 | 25 | 7 | 2 | 2 | 6 | 4032 | 13^{4} |
| 2 | 23 | Maurice J. Gallagher Jr. | 5 | 9 | 19 | 12 | 17 | 5 | 14 | 1* | 14 | 10 | 5 | 1*^{1} | 13 | 11 | 5 | 9 | 12 | **1***^{12} | 17 | 3 | 13 | 4 | 7 | 4031 | 24^{5} |
| 3 | 11 | David Gilliland | 8 | 4 | 34 | 6 | 7 | 15 | 1*^{12} | 2 | **8** | **6**^{1} | 2^{1} | 9 | 4*^{2} | **1*** | 2* | 6 | 8 | 4 | 4 | 1 | 5 | 3*^{12} | **18***^{2} | 4019 | 30^{1} |
| 4 | 42 | Al Niece | 12 | 7^{2} | 31 | 34 | 1 | 17 | 34 | 31 | 5 | 4 | 4^{2} | 4 | 1 | 12 | 11 | 1 | 4 | 2 | 6^{2} | 4 | 11 | 1 | 29 | 4008 | 21^{8} |
NASCAR Craftsman Truck Series Playoffs cut-off
| 5 | 19 | Bill McAnally | 3*^{1} | 6 | 1^{1} | 30^{1} | 15 | 30 | 15 | **30** | 1*^{1} | 25 | 6 | 2 | 23 | 3 | 7 | 11 | **2** | 3 | 1 | **2***^{12} | 19 | 20 | 1 | 2319 | 26^{6} |
| 6 | 2 | Max Siegel | **26** | 30 | 2 | 7 | **16***^{12} | 18 | 11 | 6 | 11 | 30 | 9 | 8 | **3** | 9 | **19** | 8 | 11 | 24 | 8*^{1} | 9 | 7*^{1} | **17** | 10 | 2257 | 5^{9} |
| 7 | 38 | Bob Jenkins | 1 | 2^{1} | 20 | 1* | 14 | **21** | **3** | 3 | 20 | 32 | 23 | 20 | 2^{1} | 2 | 34^{12} | 3 | 5 | 12 | 5 | 24 | 32 | 34 | 25 | 2194 | 22^{3} |
| 8 | 98 | Mike Curb | 6 | 5 | 11 | 3 | 4 | 2 | 4 | 25^{2} | 31 | 2 | 7 | **30** | 31 | 7^{2} | 6 | **2***^{12} | 1*^{12} | 7 | 18 | 19 | 21 | 9 | 14*^{1} | 2185 | 16^{2} |
| 9 | 25 | Curtis Sutton | 20 | 12 | 6 | 29 | 32 | 10 | 7 | 29 | 25 | 3 | 8 | 6 | 7 | 8 | 10 | 17 | 10 | 27 | 3 | 10 | 4 | 14 | 30 | 2164 | 1^{10} |
| 10 | 51 | Kyle Busch | 27 | **1*** | 10 | 2^{2} | 9 | 3 | 2 | 7^{1} | 4^{2} | 11 | 18 | 29 | 30 | 31 | 1 | 5 | 18 | 25 | 16 | 36 | 14 | 12 | 27 | 2105 | 4^{7} |
| 11 | 88 | Rhonda Thorson | 9 | 11 | 9^{2} | 33 | 13 | 4 | 26 | 11 | 12 | 7 | 12 | 25 | 15 | 6 | 14 | 7 | 9 | 5 | 33 | 16 | 24 | 7 | 11 | 614 | 1 |
| 12 | 4 | Kyle Busch | 17 | 8 | 7 | 27 | 2 | 28 | 10 | 33 | 32 | 8 | 16 | 5 | 6 | 13 | 18 | 22 | 14 | 6 | **14** | 8 | **28** | 10 | 3 | 582 | – |
| 13 | 17 | David Gilliland | 14 | 31 | 3* | 11 | 24 | 34 | 8 | 9 | 21 | 21 | 10 | 13 | 14 | 15 | 3 | 14 | 20 | 13 | 2 | 5 | 18 | 13 | 23 | 561 | – |
| 14 | 35 | William Hilgemann | 10 | 10 | 18 | 19 | 5 | 6 | 13 | 8 | 26 | 23 | 15 | 10 | 10 | 16 | 35 | 4 | 13 | 9 | 12 | 11 | 29 | 15 | 2 | 561 | – |
| 15 | 52 | Chris Larsen | 28 | 14 | 22 | 14 | 3 | 23 | 30 | 4 | 2 | 13 | 22 | 3^{2} | 18 | 4 | 32 | 27 | 30 | 30 | 7 | 14 | 34 | 6 | 24 | 537 | 1 |
| Pos. | No. | Truck Owner | DAY | LVS | ATL | COA | TEX | BRD | MAR | KAN | DAR | NWS | CLT | GTW | NSH | MOH | POC | RCH | IRP | MLW | KAN | BRI | TAL | HOM | PHO | Points | Bonus |

=== Manufacturers' championship ===
| Pos | Manufacturer | Wins | Points |
|---|---|---|---|
| 1 | Chevrolet | 14 | 868 |
| 2 | Ford | 6 | 795 |
| 3 | Toyota | 3 | 788 |

== See also ==
- 2023 NASCAR Cup Series
- 2023 NASCAR Xfinity Series
- 2023 ARCA Menards Series
- 2023 ARCA Menards Series East
- 2023 ARCA Menards Series West
- 2023 NASCAR Whelen Modified Tour
- 2023 NASCAR Pinty's Series
- 2023 NASCAR Mexico Series
- 2023 NASCAR Whelen Euro Series
- 2023 NASCAR Brasil Sprint Race
- 2023 SRX Series
- 2023 CARS Tour
- 2023 SMART Modified Tour
