= NASCAR Craftsman Truck Series at Circuit of the Americas =

NASCAR Craftsman Truck Series race held at COTA

XPEL 225

NASCAR Craftsman Truck Series
- Venue: Circuit of the Americas
- Location: Austin, Texas
- Corporate sponsor: XPEL
- First race: 2021
- Last race: 2024
- Distance: 140.466 mi (226.058 km)
- Laps: 42; Stage 1: 12; Stage 2: 14; Final stage: 16
- Previous names: Toyota Tundra 225 (2021)
- Most wins (driver): Zane Smith (2)
- Most wins (team): Front Row Motorsports (3)
- Most wins (manufacturer): Ford (3)

Circuit information
- Surface: Asphalt
- Length: 3.426 mi (5.514 km)
- Turns: 20

The XPEL 225 was a NASCAR Craftsman Truck Series race at Circuit of the Americas in Austin, Texas. The race was introduced in 2021 as one of four road course races on the Truck Series schedule.

XPEL held the naming rights to the race. The inaugural event in 2021 was sponsored by Toyota and called the Toyota Tundra 225. The race, along with the NASCAR Xfinity Series' Focused Health 250, was a support event to the NASCAR Cup Series' EchoPark Automotive Grand Prix.

The No. 38 Front Row Motorsports truck went undefeated in the first three Truck Series races at COTA with Todd Gilliland driving it in 2021 and Zane Smith driving it in 2022 and 2023. Corey Heim broke that streak in 2024 when he won the race driving the No. 11 Tricon Garage truck.

The race was removed from the schedule in 2025.

== Past winners ==
Year	Date	No.	Driver	Team	Manufacturer	Race distance		Race time	Average speed (mph)	Report	Ref
Year	Date	No.	Driver	Team	Manufacturer	Laps	Miles (km)	Race time	Average speed (mph)	Report	Ref
2021	May 22	38	Todd Gilliland	Front Row Motorsports	Ford	41	140.46 (226.04)	1:58:30	70.79	Report	
2022	March 26	38	Zane Smith	Front Row Motorsports	Ford	46*	156.86 (252.432)	2:25:00	64.908	Report	
2023	March 25	38	Zane Smith	Front Row Motorsports	Ford	42	140.46 (226.04)	1:51:36	77	Report	
2024	March 23	11	Corey Heim	Tricon Garage	Toyota	46*	156.86 (252.432)	2:15:26	69.492	Report	

- 2022 and 2024: Race extended due to NASCAR overtime.

=== Multiple winners (teams) ===
# Wins	Team	Years won
3	Front Row Motorsports	2021–2023
1	Tricon Garage	2024

=== Manufacturer wins ===
# Wins	Make	Years won
3	(United States) Ford	2021–2023
1	(Japan) Toyota	2024
