= O'Reilly Auto Parts 150 at Mid-Ohio =

NASCAR Truck Series race at Mid-Ohio Sports Car Course

- Mid-Ohio Sports Car Course Layout

NASCAR Craftsman Truck Series
- Venue: Mid-Ohio Sports Car Course
- Location: Lexington, Ohio
- Corporate sponsor: O'Reilly Auto Parts
- First race: 2022
- Last race: 2023
- Distance: 151 miles (243 km)
- Laps: 67; Stage 1: 15; Stage 2: 20; Stage 3: 32

Circuit information
- Surface: Asphalt
- Length: 2.400 mi (3.862 km)
- Turns: 15

The O'Reilly Auto Parts 150 at Mid-Ohio was a NASCAR Craftsman Truck Series race that is held at the Mid-Ohio Sports Car Course road course in Lexington, Ohio.

== History ==
The 2022 Truck Series schedule was released on September 29 with Mid-Ohio on Saturday, July 9. The track was given the race as a result of losing their Xfinity Series race to Portland International Raceway. Both the Mid-Ohio and Portland road courses are owned and operated by Green Savoree Racing Promotions. It was the first time that Green Savoree had a total of two NASCAR national series races in any series.

This race became an additional 23rd race on the Truck Series schedule. The series had 23 races in 2020 but only 22 races in 2021 as a result of the race at Iowa Speedway not being replaced with another race.

The race will be 151 miles and 67 laps long according to NASCAR.com.

On May 5, 2022, O'Reilly Auto Parts was announced as the title sponsor of the race.

On October 4, 2023, Mid-Ohio was removed from the schedule.

== Past winners ==
Year	Date	No.	Driver	Team	Manufacturer	Race distance		Race time	Average speed (mph)	Report	Ref
Year	Date	No.	Driver	Team	Manufacturer	Laps	Miles (km)	Race time	Average speed (mph)	Report	Ref
2022	July 9	75	Parker Kligerman	Henderson Motorsports	Chevrolet	67	151 (243)	2:19:24	65.116	Report	
2023	July 8	11	Corey Heim	Tricon Garage	Toyota	67	151 (243)	2:46:44	54.441	Report	

=== Manufacturer wins ===
# Wins	Make	Years won
1	(United States) Chevrolet	2022
1	(Japan) Toyota	2023
