= Roger Reuse =

American racing driver (born 1966)

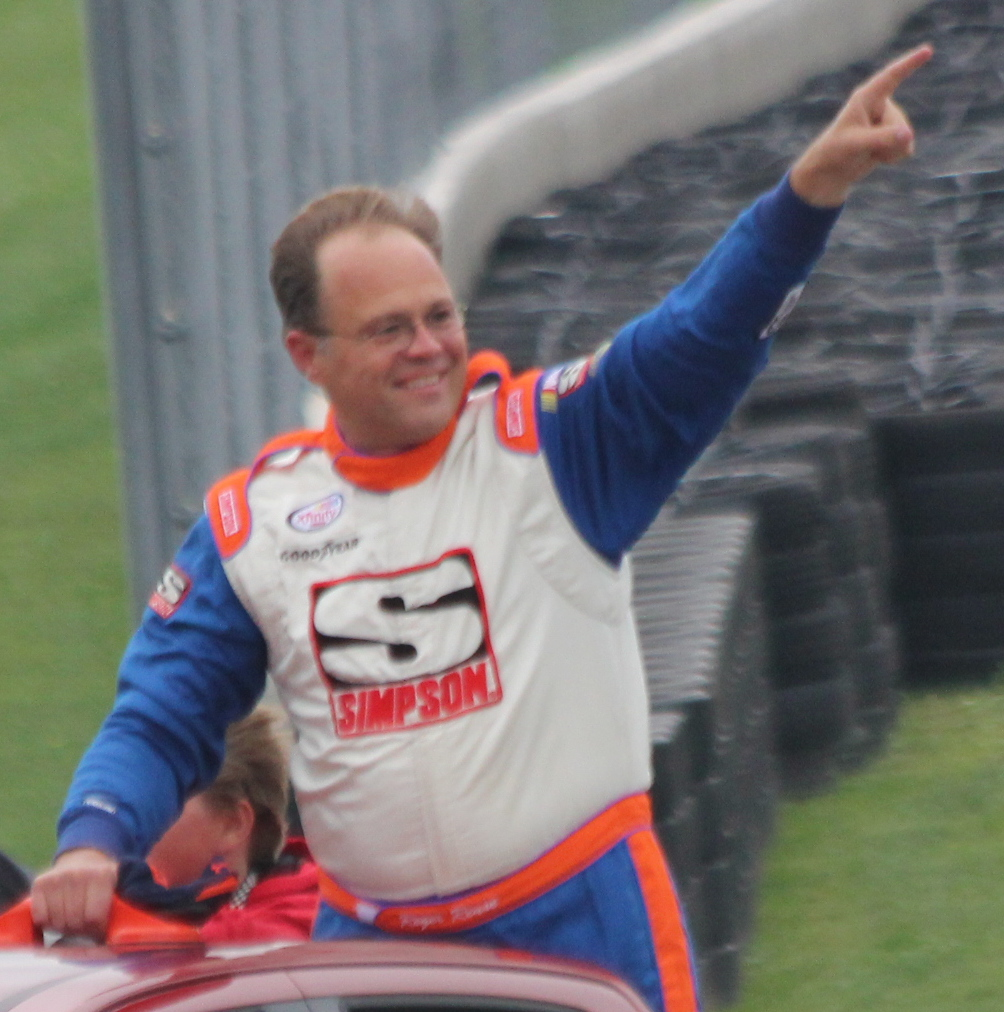
- Reuse at Road America in 2015
- Born: Roger E. Reuse; August 9, 1966 (age 60); Birmingham, Alabama, U.S.

NASCAR O'Reilly Auto Parts Series career
- 4 races run over 3 years
- 2016 position: 75th
- Best finish: 72nd (2014)
- First race: 2014 Zippo 200 at The Glen (Watkins Glen)
- Last race: 2016 Mid-Ohio Challenge (Mid-Ohio)
Wins	Top tens	Poles
0	0	0

NASCAR FedEx Freight Truck Series career
- 8 races run over 4 years
- 2021 position: 63rd
- Best finish: 63rd (2021)
- First race: 2018 Chevrolet Silverado 250 (Mosport)
- Last race: 2021 United Rentals 200 (Martinsville)
Wins	Top tens	Poles
0	0	0
- Statistics up to date as of December 30, 2021.

Roger E. Reuse (born August 9, 1966) is an American professional sports car racing and stock car racing driver. He has raced in the Trans-Am Series, NASCAR Xfinity Series and NASCAR Camping World Truck Series.

In Trans-Am, he and his brother Bobby Reuse operate the GT2 team Reuse Brothers Racing.

== Racing career ==
=== Xfinity Series ===
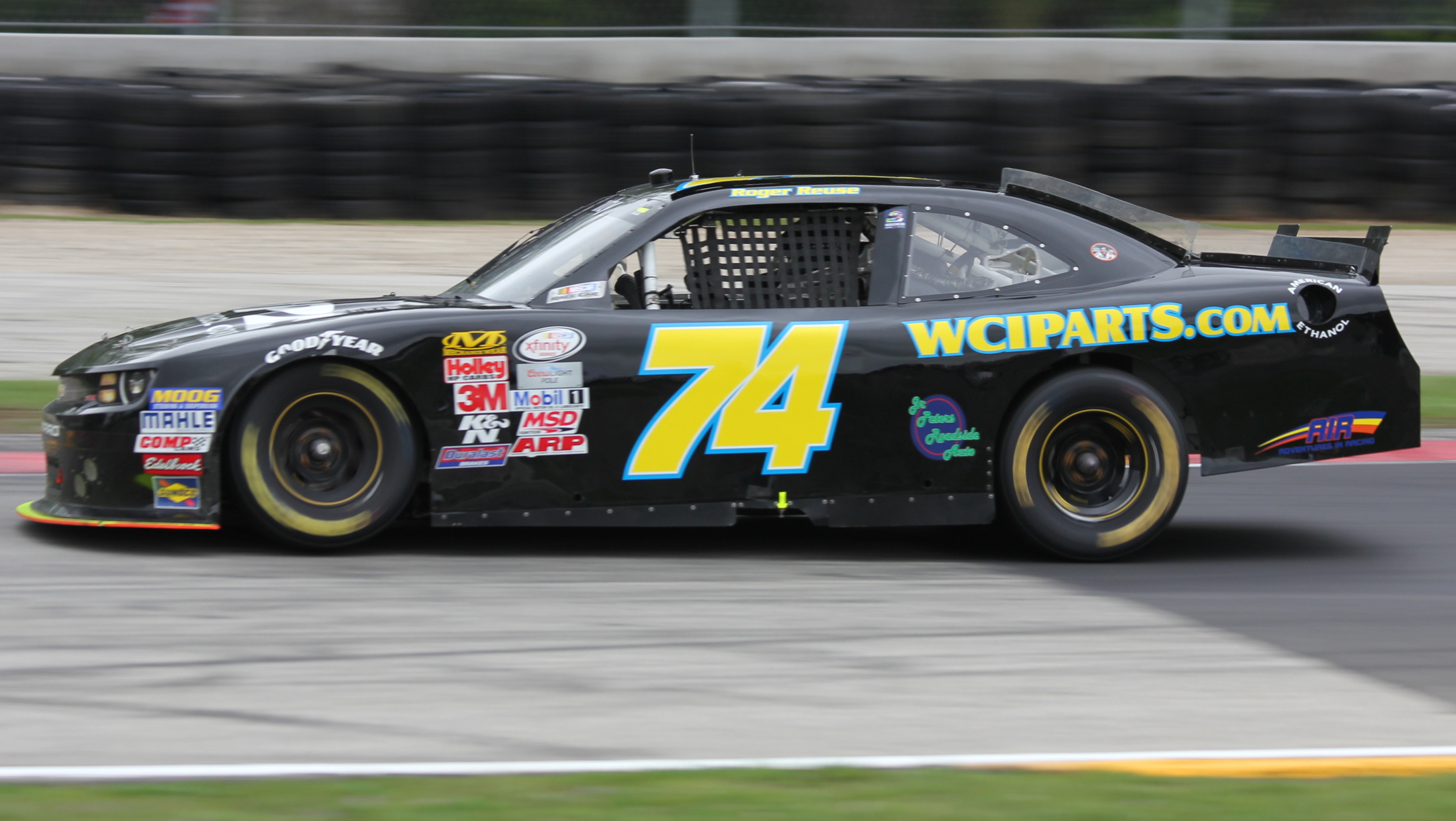
Reuse racing at Road America in 2015

In 2014, Reuse and his brother Bobby made their NASCAR debut. Reuse drove the No. 74 Chevrolet for Mike Harmon Racing at Watkins Glen. He started 38th and finished 30th. In his next and final race of the season at Mid-Ohio, Reuse started and finished 39th in the No. 77 Dodge due to transmission issues.

In 2015, Reuse returned to Mike Harmon Racing in the Xfinity Series for the Road America race. He started 37th and finished 31st.

Reuse returned to the team for the 2016 season. He drove the No. 74 Dodge in the Mid-Ohio race, starting 39th and finishing 33rd.

=== Truck Series ===
In 2018, Reuse drove No. 97 Chevrolet Silverado for Jordan Anderson Racing using JJL Motorsports' owners points at Canada in his Truck Series debut. He started 24th and finished 27th due to a vibration.

In 2019, Reuse returned once again to Jordan Anderson Racing at Canada's race but now driving the No. 04 Chevrolet Silverado using Roper Racing's owners points. He started 26th and finished 25th. Bobby drove the No. 56 Chevrolet Silverado for the same team in the same race.

Reuse made his Truck return in August 2020 for the Sunoco 159 at the Daytona International Speedway road course, driving the No. 49 CMI Motorsports truck. After the No. 49 was withdrawn from the 2021 race, Reuse and his brother rejoined Jordan Anderson Racing for a part-time schedule in the No. 3.

== Personal life ==
The Reuses own Alabama Controls, Inc., an energy and security company founded by their father in 1975.

== Motorsports career results ==
=== NASCAR ===
(key) (Bold – Pole position awarded by qualifying time. Italics – Pole position earned by points standings or practice time. * – Most laps led.)

==== Xfinity Series ====
NASCAR Xfinity Series results
Year	Team	No.	Make	1	2	3	4	5	6	7	8	9	10	11	12	13	14	15	16	17	18	19	20	21	22	23	24	25	26	27	28	29	30	31	32	33	NXSC	Pts	Ref
2014	Mike Harmon Racing	74	Chevy	DAY	PHO	LVS	BRI	CAL	TEX	DAR	RCH	TAL	IOW	CLT	DOV	MCH	ROA	KEN	DAY	NHA	CHI	IND	IOW	GLN; 30													72nd	14	
2014	Mike Harmon Racing	77	Dodge																						MOH; 39	BRI	ATL	RCH	CHI	KEN	DOV	KAN	CLT	TEX	PHO	HOM	72nd	14	
2015	Mike Harmon Racing	74	Chevy	DAY	ATL	LVS	PHO	CAL	TEX	BRI	RCH	TAL	IOW	CLT	DOV	MCH	CHI	DAY	KEN	NHA	IND	IOW	GLN	MOH	BRI	ROA; 31	DAR	RCH	CHI	KEN	DOV	CLT	KAN	TEX	PHO	HOM	76th	13	
2016	Mike Harmon Racing	74	Dodge	DAY	ATL	LVS	PHO	CAL	TEX	BRI	RCH	TAL	DOV	CLT	POC	MCH	IOW	DAY	KEN	NHA	IND	IOW	GLN	MOH; 33	BRI	ROA	DAR	RCH	CHI	KEN	DOV	CLT	KAN	TEX	PHO	HOM	75th	8	

==== Camping World Truck Series ====
NASCAR Camping World Truck Series results
Year	Team	No.	Make	1	2	3	4	5	6	7	8	9	10	11	12	13	14	15	16	17	18	19	20	21	22	23	NCWTC	Pts	Ref
2018	Jordan Anderson Racing	97	Chevy	DAY	ATL	LVS	MAR	DOV	KAN	CLT	TEX	IOW	GTW	CHI	KEN	ELD	POC	MCH	BRI	MSP; 27	LVS	TAL	MAR	TEX	PHO	HOM	83rd	10	
2019	Jordan Anderson Racing	04	Chevy	DAY	ATL	LVS	MAR	TEX	DOV	KAN	CLT	TEX	IOW	GTW	CHI	KEN	POC	ELD	MCH	BRI	MSP; 26	LVS	TAL	MAR	PHO	HOM	83rd	12	
2020	CMI Motorsports	49	Chevy	DAY	LVS	CLT	ATL	HOM	POC	KEN	TEX	KAN	KAN	MCH	DAY; 38	DOV	GTW; 27	DAR	RCH	BRI	LVS	TAL	KAN	TEX	MAR	PHO	70th	15	
2021	CMI Motorsports	49	Chevy	DAY	DAY; DNQ	LVS	ATL	BRI	RCH	KAN	DAR																63rd	25	
2021	Jordan Anderson Racing	3	Chevy									COA; 34	CLT	TEX	NSH	POC	KNX										63rd	25	
2021	CMI Motorsports	49	Ford															GLN; 30	GTW; 24	DAR	BRI	LVS	TAL	MAR; 35	PHO		63rd	25	

^{*} Season still in progress
^{1} Ineligible for series points
