= John Atwell =

John Atwell may refer to:

- John Atwell (engineer) (1911–1999), Scottish engineer
- John Atwell (racing driver) (born 1973), American racing driver
