= Samuel LeComte =

American racing driver (born 1960)

- Born: Samuel Mark LeComte; October 15, 1960 (age 66); Flower Mound, Texas, U.S.

NASCAR FedEx Freight Truck Series career
- 2022 position: 89th
- Best finish: 89th (2022)
- Statistics up to date as of March 24, 2023.

Samuel Mark LeComte (born October 15, 1960) is an American professional stock car racing driver. He last competed part-time in the NASCAR Craftsman Truck Series, driving the No. 8 Chevrolet Silverado for NEMCO Motorsports.

== Racing career ==
LeComte mainly races in the Trans-Am Series TA2 class. Due to having experience at the Circuit of the Americas, when NASCAR made its debut there, CMI Motorsports brought in LeComte to make his NASCAR Camping World Truck Series debut in the No. 72 truck. However, he posted the 40th fastest time in qualifying, which was not enough to make the race.

== Motorsports career results ==
=== NASCAR ===
(key) (Bold – Pole position awarded by qualifying time. Italics – Pole position earned by points standings or practice time. * – Most laps led.)

==== Craftsman Truck Series ====
NASCAR Craftsman Truck Series results
| Year | Team | No. | Make | 1 | 2 | 3 | 4 | 5 | 6 | 7 | 8 | 9 | 10 | 11 | 12 | 13 | 14 | 15 | 16 | 17 | 18 | 19 | 20 | 21 | 22 | 23 | NCTC | Pts | Ref |
|---|---|---|---|---|---|---|---|---|---|---|---|---|---|---|---|---|---|---|---|---|---|---|---|---|---|---|---|---|---|
| 2021 | CMI Motorsports | 72 | Chevy | DAY | DRC | LVS | ATL | BRD | RCH | KAN | DAR | COA; DNQ | CLT | TEX | NSH | POC | KNX | GLN; DNQ | GTW | DAR | BRI | LVS | TAL | MAR | PHO | | 118th | 0 | |
| 2022 | G2G Racing | 47 | Toyota | DAY | LVS | ATL | COA; DNQ | MAR | BRD | DAR | KAN | TEX | CLT | GTW | SON | KNX | NSH | MOH | POC | IRP | RCH | KAN | BRI | TAL | HOM | PHO | 89th | 0 | |
| 2023 | NEMCO Motorsports | 8 | Chevy | DAY | LVS | ATL | COA; DNQ | TEX | BRD | MAR | KAN | DAR | NWS | CLT | GTW | NSH | MOH | POC | RCH | IRP | MLW | KAN | BRI | TAL | HOM | PHO | N/A | 0 | |

^{*} Season still in progress
^{1} Ineligible for series points
