= 2023 XPEL 225 =

4th race of the 2023 NASCAR Craftsman Truck Series

Race details
- Race 4 of 23 of the 2023 NASCAR Craftsman Truck Series
- Date: March 25, 2023
- Location: Circuit of the Americas, Austin, Texas
- Course: Permanent racing facility
- Course length: 3.426 miles (5.514 km)
- Distance: 42 laps, 140 mi (226 km)
- Average speed: 77.000 mph (123.919 km/h)

Pole position
Driver	Ross Chastain	Niece Motorsports
- Time: 2:13.613

Most laps led
Driver	Zane Smith	Front Row Motorsports
- Laps: 16

Winner
No. 38	Zane Smith	Front Row Motorsports

Television in the United States
- Network: FS1
- Announcers: Jamie Little, Kevin Harvick, and Michael Waltrip

Radio in the United States
- Radio: MRN

The 2023 XPEL 225 was the 4th stock car race of the 2023 NASCAR Craftsman Truck Series, and the 3rd iteration of the event. The race was held on Saturday, March 25, 2023, in Austin, Texas, at Circuit of the Americas, a 3.426 miles (5.514 km) permanent asphalt road course. The race took the scheduled 42 laps to complete. Zane Smith, driving for Front Row Motorsports, would hold off the field in the final 10 laps, and earned his 9th career NASCAR Craftsman Truck Series win, along with his second of the season. Smith would also dominate a portion of the race, leading 16 laps. To fill out the podium, Kyle Busch, driving for his own team, Kyle Busch Motorsports, and Ty Majeski, driving for ThorSport Racing, would finish 2nd and 3rd, respectively.

== Background ==
Circuit of the Americas (COTA) is a grade 1 FIA-specification motorsports facility located within the extraterritorial jurisdiction of Austin, Texas. It features a 3.426-mile (5.514 km) road racing circuit. The facility is home to the Formula One United States Grand Prix, and the Motorcycle Grand Prix of the Americas, a round of the FIM Road Racing World Championship. It previously hosted the Supercars Championship, the FIA World Endurance Championship, the IMSA SportsCar Championship, and IndyCar Series.

=== Entry list ===
- (R) denotes rookie driver.
- (i) denotes driver who is ineligible for series driver points.

#	Driver	Team	Make
1	Kaz Grala (i)	Tricon Garage	Toyota
02	Kris Wright	Young's Motorsports	Chevrolet
2	Nick Sanchez (R)	Rev Racing	Chevrolet
04	Kaden Honeycutt	Roper Racing	Ford
4	Chase Purdy	Kyle Busch Motorsports	Chevrolet
5	Dean Thompson	Tricon Garage	Toyota
7	Alex Bowman (i)	Spire Motorsports	Chevrolet
8	Samuel LeComte	NEMCO Motorsports	Chevrolet
9	Colby Howard	CR7 Motorsports	Chevrolet
11	Corey Heim	Tricon Garage	Toyota
12	Spencer Boyd (Note: Due to travel issues, Stefan Parsons practiced and qualified Boyd's No. 12 truck, Boyd made the race.)	Young's Motorsports	Chevrolet
13	Hailie Deegan	ThorSport Racing	Ford
15	Tanner Gray	Tricon Garage	Toyota
16	Tyler Ankrum	Hattori Racing Enterprises	Toyota
17	Taylor Gray (R)	Tricon Garage	Toyota
19	Christian Eckes	McAnally–Hilgemann Racing	Chevrolet
20	Ed Jones	Young's Motorsports	Chevrolet
22	Logan Bearden	AM Racing	Ford
23	Grant Enfinger	GMS Racing	Chevrolet
24	Rajah Caruth (R)	GMS Racing	Chevrolet
25	Matt DiBenedetto	Rackley W.A.R.	Chevrolet
30	Colin Garrett	On Point Motorsports	Toyota
32	Bret Holmes (R)	Bret Holmes Racing	Chevrolet
33	Mason Massey	Reaume Brothers Racing	Ford
34	Mason Filippi	Reaume Brothers Racing	Ford
35	Jake Garcia (R)	McAnally–Hilgemann Racing	Chevrolet
38	Zane Smith	Front Row Motorsports	Ford
41	Ross Chastain (i)	Niece Motorsports	Chevrolet
42	Carson Hocevar	Niece Motorsports	Chevrolet
43	Daniel Dye (R)	GMS Racing	Chevrolet
45	Lawless Alan	Niece Motorsports	Chevrolet
46	Dale Quarterley	G2G Racing	Toyota
51	Kyle Busch (i)	Kyle Busch Motorsports	Chevrolet
52	Stewart Friesen	Halmar Friesen Racing	Toyota
56	Timmy Hill	Hill Motorsports	Toyota
75	Parker Kligerman (i)	Henderson Motorsports	Chevrolet
88	Matt Crafton	ThorSport Racing	Ford
98	Ty Majeski	ThorSport Racing	Ford
99	Ben Rhodes	ThorSport Racing	Ford
Official entry list

== Practice ==
The first and only practice session was held on Friday, March 24, at 3:30 PM CST, and last for 20 minutes. Kyle Busch, driving for his own team, Kyle Busch Motorsports, would set the fastest time in the session, with a lap of 2:15.582, and an average speed of 90.543 mph (145.715 km/h).

Pos.	#	Driver	Team	Make	Time	Speed
1	51	Kyle Busch (i)	Kyle Busch Motorsports	Chevrolet	2:15.582	90.543
2	41	Ross Chastain (i)	Niece Motorsports	Chevrolet	2:16.009	90.259
3	99	Ben Rhodes	ThorSport Racing	Ford	2:16.458	89.962
Full practice results

== Qualifying ==
Qualifying was held on Friday, March 24, at 4:00 PM CST. Since Circuit of the Americas is a road course, the qualifying system is a two group system, with two rounds. Drivers will be separated into two groups, Group A and Group B. Each driver will have multiple laps to set a time. The fastest 5 drivers from each group will advance to the final round. The fastest driver to set a time in that round will win the pole.

Under a 2021 rule change, the timing line in road course qualifying is ''not'' the start-finish line. Instead, the timing line for qualifying will be set at the exit of Istanbul 8. Ross Chastain, driving for Niece Motorsports, would win the pole after advancing from the preliminary round and setting the fastest lap in Round 2, with a lap of 2:13.613, and an average speed of 91.877 mph (147.862 km/h).

Three drivers would fail to qualify: Samuel LeComte, Alex Bowman, and Mason Massey.

=== Full qualifying results ===
Pos.	#	Driver	Team	Make	Time (R1)	Speed (R1)	Time (R2)	Speed (R2)
1	41	Ross Chastain (i)	Niece Motorsports	Chevrolet	2:13.976	91.628	2:13.613	91.877
2	51	Kyle Busch (i)	Kyle Busch Motorsports	Chevrolet	2:14.520	91.258	2:14.178	91.490
3	98	Ty Majeski	ThorSport Racing	Ford	2:14.739	91.109	2:14.568	91.225
4	2	Nick Sanchez (R)	Rev Racing	Chevrolet	2:15.204	90.796	2:14.912	90.993
5	19	Christian Eckes	McAnally–Hilgemann Racing	Chevrolet	2:14.416	91.328	2:14.995	90.937
6	42	Carson Hocevar	Niece Motorsports	Chevrolet	2:15.284	90.742	2:15.150	90.832
7	38	Zane Smith	Front Row Motorsports	Ford	2:15.434	90.642	2:15.706	90.460
8	23	Grant Enfinger	GMS Racing	Chevrolet	2:15.242	90.771	2:15.852	90.363
9	15	Tanner Gray	Tricon Garage	Toyota	2:16.325	90.050	2:16.423	89.985
10	1	Kaz Grala (i)	Tricon Garage	Toyota	2:15.487	90.606	2:16.515	89.924
Eliminated from Round 1
11	11	Corey Heim	Tricon Garage	Toyota	2:15.998	90.266	—	—
12	16	Tyler Ankrum	Hattori Racing Enterprises	Toyota	2:16.210	90.126	—	—
13	99	Ben Rhodes	ThorSport Racing	Ford	2:16.285	90.076	—	—
14	22	Logan Bearden	AM Racing	Ford	2:16.411	89.993	—	—
15	52	Stewart Friesen	Halmar Friesen Racing	Toyota	2:16.471	89.953	—	—
16	13	Hailie Deegan	ThorSport Racing	Ford	2:16.516	89.924	—	—
17	75	Parker Kligerman (i)	Henderson Motorsports	Chevrolet	2:16.537	89.910	—	—
18	45	Lawless Alan	Niece Motorsports	Chevrolet	2:16.559	89.895	—	—
19	17	Taylor Gray (R)	Tricon Garage	Toyota	2:16.755	89.766	—	—
20	24	Rajah Caruth (R)	GMS Racing	Chevrolet	2:16.826	89.720	—	—
21	4	Chase Purdy	Kyle Busch Motorsports	Chevrolet	2:17.392	89.350	—	—
22	5	Dean Thompson	Tricon Garage	Toyota	2:17.529	89.261	—	—
23	20	Ed Jones	Young's Motorsports	Chevrolet	2:17.844	89.057	—	—
24	04	Kaden Honeycutt	Roper Racing	Ford	2:18.157	88.855	—	—
25	30	Colin Garrett	On Point Motorsports	Toyota	2:18.925	88.364	—	—
26	12	Stefan Parsons (i)	Young's Motorsports	Chevrolet	2:18.946	88.351	—	—
27	9	Colby Howard	CR7 Motorsports	Chevrolet	2:19.097	88.255	—	—
28	25	Matt DiBenedetto	Rackley W.A.R.	Chevrolet	2:19.261	88.151	—	—
29	56	Timmy Hill	Hill Motorsports	Toyota	2:19.551	87.968	—	—
30	34	Mason Filippi	Reaume Brothers Racing	Ford	2:19.956	87.713	—	—
31	32	Bret Holmes (R)	Bret Holmes Racing	Chevrolet	2:20.147	87.594	—	—
Qualified by owner's points
32	35	Jake Garcia (R)	McAnally–Hilgemann Racing	Chevrolet	2:20.227	87.544	—	—
33	46	Dale Quarterley	G2G Racing	Toyota	2:20.630	87.293	—	—
34	88	Matt Crafton	ThorSport Racing	Ford	—	—	—	—
35	02	Kris Wright	Young's Motorsports	Chevrolet	—	—	—	—
36	43	Daniel Dye (R)	GMS Racing	Chevrolet	—	—	—	—
Failed to qualify
37	8	Samuel LeComte	NEMCO Motorsports	Chevrolet	2:22.843	85.941	—	—
38	7	Alex Bowman (i)	Spire Motorsports	Chevrolet	2:54.534	70.336	—	—
39	33	Mason Massey	Reaume Brothers Racing	Ford	—	—	—	—
Official qualifying results
Official starting lineup

== Race results ==
Stage 1 Laps: 12

Pos.	#	Driver	Team	Make	Pts
1	19	Christian Eckes	McAnally–Hilgemann Racing	Chevrolet	10
2	98	Ty Majeski	ThorSport Racing	Ford	9
3	11	Corey Heim	Tricon Garage	Toyota	8
4	1	Kaz Grala (i)	Tricon Garage	Toyota	0
5	51	Kyle Busch (i)	Kyle Busch Motorsports	Chevrolet	0
6	41	Ross Chastain (i)	Niece Motorsports	Chevrolet	0
7	16	Tyler Ankrum	Hattori Racing Enterprises	Toyota	4
8	38	Zane Smith	Front Row Motorsports	Ford	3
9	99	Ben Rhodes	ThorSport Racing	Ford	2
10	25	Matt DiBenedetto	Rackley W.A.R.	Chevrolet	1

Stage 2 Laps: 14

Pos.	#	Driver	Team	Make	Pts
1	51	Kyle Busch (i)	Kyle Busch Motorsports	Chevrolet	0
2	38	Zane Smith	Front Row Motorsports	Ford	9
3	45	Lawless Alan	Niece Motorsports	Chevrolet	8
4	52	Stewart Friesen	Halmar Friesen Racing	Toyota	7
5	75	Parker Kligerman (i)	Henderson Motorsports	Chevrolet	0
6	13	Hailie Deegan	ThorSport Racing	Ford	5
7	41	Ross Chastain (i)	Niece Motorsports	Chevrolet	0
8	04	Kaden Honeycutt	Roper Racing	Ford	4
9	99	Ben Rhodes	ThorSport Racing	Ford	2
10	2	Nick Sanchez (R)	Rev Racing	Chevrolet	1

Stage 3 Laps: 16

Fin	St	#	Driver	Team	Make	Laps	Led	Status	Pts
1	7	38	Zane Smith	Front Row Motorsports	Ford	42	16	Running	52
2	2	51	Kyle Busch (i)	Kyle Busch Motorsports	Chevrolet	42	12	Running	0
3	3	98	Ty Majeski	ThorSport Racing	Ford	42	1	Running	43
4	12	16	Tyler Ankrum	Hattori Racing Enterprises	Toyota	42	0	Running	37
5	1	41	Ross Chastain (i)	Niece Motorsports	Chevrolet	42	10	Running	0
6	11	11	Corey Heim	Tricon Garage	Toyota	42	0	Running	39
7	4	2	Nick Sanchez (R)	Rev Racing	Chevrolet	42	0	Running	31
8	9	15	Tanner Gray	Tricon Garage	Toyota	42	0	Running	29
9	10	1	Kaz Grala (i)	Tricon Garage	Toyota	42	0	Running	0
10	13	99	Ben Rhodes	ThorSport Racing	Ford	42	0	Running	31
11	19	17	Taylor Gray (R)	Tricon Garage	Toyota	42	0	Running	26
12	8	23	Grant Enfinger	GMS Racing	Chevrolet	42	0	Running	25
13	20	24	Rajah Caruth (R)	GMS Racing	Chevrolet	42	0	Running	24
14	15	52	Stewart Friesen	Halmar Friesen Racing	Toyota	42	0	Running	30
15	24	04	Kaden Honeycutt	Roper Racing	Ford	42	0	Running	25
16	16	13	Hailie Deegan	ThorSport Racing	Ford	42	0	Running	26
17	18	45	Lawless Alan	Niece Motorsports	Chevrolet	42	0	Running	28
18	36	43	Daniel Dye (R)	GMS Racing	Chevrolet	42	0	Running	19
19	32	35	Jake Garcia (R)	McAnally–Hilgemann Racing	Chevrolet	42	0	Running	18
20	25	30	Colin Garrett	On Point Motorsports	Toyota	42	0	Running	17
21	35	02	Kris Wright	Young's Motorsports	Chevrolet	42	0	Running	16
22	14	22	Logan Bearden	AM Racing	Ford	42	0	Running	15
23	31	32	Bret Holmes (R)	Bret Holmes Racing	Chevrolet	42	0	Running	14
24	27	9	Colby Howard	CR7 Motorsports	Chevrolet	42	0	Running	13
25	29	56	Timmy Hill	Hill Motorsports	Toyota	42	0	Running	12
26	30	34	Mason Filippi	Reaume Brothers Racing	Ford	42	0	Running	11
27	21	4	Chase Purdy	Kyle Busch Motorsports	Chevrolet	42	0	Running	10
28	33	46	Dale Quarterley	G2G Racing	Toyota	42	0	Running	9
29	28	25	Matt DiBenedetto	Rackley W.A.R.	Chevrolet	41	0	Running	9
30	5	19	Christian Eckes	McAnally–Hilgemann Racing	Chevrolet	31	3	Suspension	17
31	17	75	Parker Kligerman (i)	Henderson Motorsports	Chevrolet	26	0	Electrical	12
32	26	12	Spencer Boyd	Young's Motorsports	Chevrolet	12	0	Electrical	5
33	34	88	Matt Crafton	ThorSport Racing	Ford	11	0	Accident	4
34	6	42	Carson Hocevar	Niece Motorsports	Chevrolet	8	0	Axle	3
35	22	5	Dean Thompson	Tricon Garage	Toyota	4	0	Accident	2
36	23	20	Ed Jones	Young's Motorsports	Chevrolet	0	0	Suspension	1
Official race results

== Standings after the race ==
Drivers' Championship standings

	Pos	Driver	Points
4	1	Zane Smith	168
1	2	Ty Majeski	166 (-2)
1	3	Ben Rhodes	150 (-18)
4	4	Christian Eckes	148 (-20)
1	5	Grant Enfinger	131 (-37)
4	6	Matt Crafton	130 (-38)
4	7	Tyler Ankrum	114 (-54)
1	8	Matt DiBenedetto	112 (-56)
3	9	Corey Heim	110 (-58)
	10	Tanner Gray	107 (-61)
Official driver's standings

- Note: Only the first 10 positions are included for the driver standings.

Previous race: 2023 Fr8 208	NASCAR Craftsman Truck Series; 2023 season	Next race: 2023 SpeedyCash.com 250
