= 2020 Chevrolet Silverado 250 =

Race details
- Race 19 of 23 of the 2020 NASCAR Gander RV & Outdoors Truck Series
- Date: October 3, 2020
- Official name: Chevrolet Silverado 250
- Location: Lincoln, Alabama, Talladega Superspeedway
- Course: Permanent racing facility
- Course length: 2.660 miles (4.28 km)
- Distance: 94 laps, 250.04 mi (402.4 km)
- Average speed: 129.424 miles per hour (208.288 km/h)

Pole position
Driver	Sheldon Creed	GMS Racing
- Grid positions set by competition-based formula

Most laps led
Driver	Derek Kraus	McAnally–Hilgemann Racing
- Laps: 19

Winner
No. 4	Raphaël Lessard	Kyle Busch Motorsports

Television in the United States
- Network: Fox Sports 1
- Announcers: Vince Welch, Michael Waltrip, and Kurt Busch

Radio in the United States
- Radio: Motor Racing Network

The 2020 Chevrolet Silverado 250 was the 19th stock car race of the 2020 NASCAR Gander RV & Outdoors Truck Series season, the 15th iteration of the event, and the 3rd and final race of the Round of 10, making it the cutoff race for the first round. The race was held on Saturday, October 3, 2020, in Lincoln, Alabama at Talladega Superspeedway, a 2.660 miles (4.281 km) permanent triangle-shaped superspeedway. The race took the scheduled 94 laps to complete. At race's end, Raphaël Lessard of Kyle Busch Motorsports would be declared the winner after a last lap wreck occurred coming into Turn 3. Trevor Bayne and Raphaël Lessard were side by side at the time of caution- at the last scoring loop, Lessard was declared the leader, and since the caution freezes the field at the moment of caution, Lessard would win his first ever NASCAR Gander RV & Outdoors Truck Series race, and as of now, his only win in the series. To fill out the podium, Trevor Bayne of Niece Motorsports and Chandler Smith of Kyle Busch Motorsports would finish 2nd and 3rd, respectively.

Christian Eckes and Todd Gilliland were both eliminated from the Playoffs after the race, not advancing to the Round of 8.

== Background ==
Talladega Superspeedway, originally known as Alabama International Motor Superspeedway (AIMS), is a motorsports complex located north of Talladega, Alabama. It is located on the former Anniston Air Force Base in the small city of Lincoln. The track is a tri-oval and was constructed in the 1960s by NASCAR. Talladega is most known for its steep banking and the unique location of the start/finish line that's located just past the exit to pit road. The track currently hosts the top 3 NASCAR series. Talladega is the longest NASCAR oval with a length of 2.66-mile-long (4.28 km) tri-oval like the Daytona International Speedway, which also is a 2.5-mile-long (4 km) tri-oval.

=== Entry list ===
#	Driver	Team	Make
00	Jason White	Reaume Brothers Racing	Chevrolet
2	Sheldon Creed	GMS Racing	Chevrolet
02	Tate Fogleman	Young's Motorsports	Chevrolet
3	Jordan Anderson	Jordan Anderson Racing	Chevrolet
4	Raphaël Lessard	Kyle Busch Motorsports	Toyota
6	Norm Benning	Norm Benning Racing	Chevrolet
8	Joe Nemechek	NEMCO Motorsports	Ford
9	Codie Rohrbaugh	CR7 Motorsports	Chevrolet
10	Jennifer Jo Cobb	Jennifer Jo Cobb Racing	Chevrolet
13	Johnny Sauter	ThorSport Racing	Ford
15	Tanner Gray	DGR-Crosley	Ford
16	Austin Hill	Hattori Racing Enterprises	Toyota
17	Korbin Forrister	DGR-Crosley	Toyota
18	Christian Eckes	Kyle Busch Motorsports	Toyota
19	Derek Kraus	McAnally–Hilgemann Racing	Toyota
20	Spencer Boyd	Young's Motorsports	Chevrolet
21	Zane Smith	GMS Racing	Chevrolet
22	Austin Wayne Self	AM Racing	Chevrolet
23	Brett Moffitt	GMS Racing	Chevrolet
24	Chase Purdy	GMS Racing	Chevrolet
26	Tyler Ankrum	GMS Racing	Chevrolet
28	Bryan Dauzat	FDNY Racing	Chevrolet
30	Danny Bohn	On Point Motorsports	Toyota
33	Josh Reaume	Reaume Brothers Racing	Toyota
38	Todd Gilliland	Front Row Motorsports	Ford
40	Bayley Currey	Niece Motorsports	Chevrolet
41	Dawson Cram	Cram Racing Enterprises	Chevrolet
44	Natalie Decker*	Niece Motorsports	Chevrolet
45	Trevor Bayne	Niece Motorsports	Chevrolet
49	Ray Ciccarelli	CMI Motorsports	Chevrolet
51	Chandler Smith	Kyle Busch Motorsports	Toyota
52	Stewart Friesen	Halmar Friesen Racing	Toyota
56	Gus Dean	Hill Motorsports	Chevrolet
68	Clay Greenfield	Clay Greenfield Motorsports	Toyota
83	Tim Viens**	CMI Motorsports	Chevrolet
88	Matt Crafton	ThorSport Racing	Ford
97	Robby Lyons	Diversified Motorsports Enterprises	Chevrolet
98	Grant Enfinger	ThorSport Racing	Ford
99	Ben Rhodes	ThorSport Racing	Ford
Official entry list

*Driver changed to Kaz Grala for the race due to Decker not being medically cleared to race.

**Withdrew.

== Starting lineup ==
The starting lineup was selected based on the results and fastest lap of the last race, the 2020 World of Westgate 200 and owner's points. As a result, Sheldon Creed of GMS Racing won the pole.

Pos.	#	Driver	Team	Make
1	2	Sheldon Creed	GMS Racing	Chevrolet
2	16	Austin Hill	Hattori Racing Enterprises	Toyota
3	21	Zane Smith	GMS Racing	Chevrolet
4	98	Grant Enfinger	ThorSport Racing	Ford
5	51	Chandler Smith	Kyle Busch Motorsports	Toyota
6	18	Christian Eckes	Kyle Busch Motorsports	Toyota
7	88	Matt Crafton	ThorSport Racing	Ford
8	23	Brett Moffitt	GMS Racing	Chevrolet
9	26	Tyler Ankrum	GMS Racing	Chevrolet
10	38	Todd Gilliland	Front Row Motorsports	Ford
11	99	Ben Rhodes	ThorSport Racing	Ford
12	15	Tanner Gray	DGR-Crosley	Ford
13	52	Stewart Friesen	Halmar Friesen Racing	Toyota
14	13	Johnny Sauter	ThorSport Racing	Ford
15	4	Raphaël Lessard	Kyle Busch Motorsports	Toyota
16	02	Tate Fogleman	Young's Motorsports	Chevrolet
17	19	Derek Kraus	McAnally–Hilgemann Racing	Toyota
18	24	Chase Purdy	GMS Racing	Chevrolet
19	22	Austin Wayne Self	AM Racing	Chevrolet
20	30	Danny Bohn	On Point Motorsports	Toyota
21	40	Bayley Currey	Niece Motorsports	Chevrolet
22	68	Clay Greenfield	Clay Greenfield Motorsports	Toyota
23	56	Gus Dean	Hill Motorsports	Chevrolet
24	20	Spencer Boyd	Young's Motorsports	Chevrolet
25	45	Trevor Bayne	Niece Motorsports	Chevrolet
26	3	Jordan Anderson	Jordan Anderson Racing	Chevrolet
27	49	Ray Ciccarelli	CMI Motorsports	Chevrolet
28	44	Kaz Grala	Niece Motorsports	Chevrolet
29	17	Korbin Forrister	DGR-Crosley	Toyota
30	00	Jason White	Reaume Brothers Racing	Chevrolet
31	10	Jennifer Jo Cobb	Jennifer Jo Cobb Racing	Chevrolet
32	33	Josh Reaume	Reaume Brothers Racing	Toyota
33	41	Dawson Cram	Cram Racing Enterprises	Chevrolet
34	9	Codie Rohrbaugh	CR7 Motorsports	Chevrolet
35	8	Joe Nemechek	NEMCO Motorsports	Ford
36	6	Norm Benning	Norm Benning Racing	Chevrolet
37	97	Robby Lyons	Diversified Motorsports Enterprises	Chevrolet
38	28	Bryan Dauzat	FDNY Racing	Chevrolet
Withdrew
WD	83	Tim Viens	CMI Motorsports	Chevrolet
Official starting lineup

== Race results ==
Stage 1 Laps: 20

Fin	#	Driver	Team	Make	Pts
1	16	Austin Hill	Hattori Racing Enterprises	Toyota	10
2	38	Todd Gilliland	Front Row Motorsports	Ford	9
3	18	Christian Eckes	Kyle Busch Motorsports	Toyota	8
4	2	Sheldon Creed	GMS Racing	Chevrolet	7
5	99	Ben Rhodes	ThorSport Racing	Ford	6
6	51	Chandler Smith	Kyle Busch Motorsports	Toyota	5
7	56	Gus Dean	Hill Motorsports	Chevrolet	4
8	26	Tyler Ankrum	GMS Racing	Chevrolet	3
9	23	Brett Moffitt	GMS Racing	Chevrolet	2
10	19	Derek Kraus	McAnally–Hilgemann Racing	Toyota	1

Stage 2 Laps: 20

Fin	#	Driver	Team	Make	Pts
1	19	Derek Kraus	McAnally–Hilgemann Racing	Toyota	10
2	13	Johnny Sauter	ThorSport Racing	Ford	9
3	51	Chandler Smith	Kyle Busch Motorsports	Toyota	8
4	16	Austin Hill	Hattori Racing Enterprises	Toyota	7
5	23	Brett Moffitt	GMS Racing	Chevrolet	6
6	99	Ben Rhodes	ThorSport Racing	Ford	5
7	38	Todd Gilliland	Front Row Motorsports	Ford	4
8	2	Sheldon Creed	GMS Racing	Chevrolet	3
9	26	Tyler Ankrum	GMS Racing	Chevrolet	2
10	88	Matt Crafton	ThorSport Racing	Ford	1

Stage 3 Laps: 54

Fin	St	#	Driver	Team	Make	Laps	Led	Status	Pts
1	15	4	Raphaël Lessard	Kyle Busch Motorsports	Toyota	94	1	running	40
2	25	45	Trevor Bayne	Niece Motorsports	Chevrolet	94	0	running	35
3	5	51	Chandler Smith	Kyle Busch Motorsports	Toyota	94	1	running	47
4	11	99	Ben Rhodes	ThorSport Racing	Ford	94	0	running	44
5	34	9	Codie Rohrbaugh	CR7 Motorsports	Chevrolet	94	0	running	12
6	26	3	Jordan Anderson	Jordan Anderson Racing	Chevrolet	94	0	running	31
7	8	23	Brett Moffitt	GMS Racing	Chevrolet	94	13	running	38
8	7	88	Matt Crafton	ThorSport Racing	Ford	94	0	running	30
9	28	44	Kaz Grala	Niece Motorsports	Chevrolet	94	0	running	0
10	17	19	Derek Kraus	McAnally–Hilgemann Racing	Toyota	94	19	running	38
11	14	13	Johnny Sauter	ThorSport Racing	Ford	94	11	running	35
12	1	2	Sheldon Creed	GMS Racing	Chevrolet	94	10	running	35
13	4	98	Grant Enfinger	ThorSport Racing	Ford	94	0	running	24
14	22	68	Clay Greenfield	Clay Greenfield Motorsports	Toyota	94	0	running	23
15	21	40	Bayley Currey	Niece Motorsports	Chevrolet	94	0	running	22
16	9	26	Tyler Ankrum	GMS Racing	Chevrolet	94	0	running	26
17	13	52	Stewart Friesen	Halmar Friesen Racing	Toyota	94	6	running	0
18	6	18	Christian Eckes	Kyle Busch Motorsports	Toyota	93	6	crash	27
19	2	16	Austin Hill	Hattori Racing Enterprises	Toyota	93	11	crash	35
20	19	22	Austin Wayne Self	AM Racing	Chevrolet	93	0	running	17
21	38	28	Bryan Dauzat	FDNY Racing	Chevrolet	93	0	running	16
22	36	6	Norm Benning	Norm Benning Racing	Chevrolet	93	0	running	15
23	32	33	Josh Reaume	Reaume Brothers Racing	Toyota	93	0	running	14
24	31	10	Jennifer Jo Cobb	Jennifer Jo Cobb Racing	Chevrolet	92	16	running	13
25	30	00	Jason White	Reaume Brothers Racing	Chevrolet	92	0	running	12
26	37	97	Robby Lyons	Diversified Motorsports Enterprises	Chevrolet	92	0	running	0
27	27	49	Ray Ciccarelli	CMI Motorsports	Chevrolet	88	0	running	10
28	10	38	Todd Gilliland	Front Row Motorsports	Ford	47	0	engine	22
29	12	15	Tanner Gray	DGR-Crosley	Ford	47	0	crash	8
30	23	56	Gus Dean	Hill Motorsports	Chevrolet	36	0	crash	11
31	16	02	Tate Fogleman	Young's Motorsports	Chevrolet	19	0	crash	6
32	18	24	Chase Purdy	GMS Racing	Chevrolet	12	0	crash	5
33	3	21	Zane Smith	GMS Racing	Chevrolet	12	0	crash	5
34	20	30	Danny Bohn	On Point Motorsports	Toyota	12	0	crash	5
35	33	41	Dawson Cram	Cram Racing Enterprises	Chevrolet	12	0	crash	5
36	29	17	Korbin Forrister	DGR-Crosley	Toyota	12	0	crash	5
37	35	8	Joe Nemechek	NEMCO Motorsports	Ford	12	0	crash	5
38	24	20	Spencer Boyd	Young's Motorsports	Chevrolet	12	0	crash	5
Official race results

Previous race: 2020 World of Westgate 200	NASCAR Gander RV & Outdoors Truck Series; 2020 season	Next race: 2020 Clean Harbors 200
