= 2020 Pocono Organics 150 =

2020 Pocono Organics 150 to Benefit Farm Aid
Race details
- Race 6 of 23 of the 2020 NASCAR Gander RV & Outdoors Truck Series
- Date: June 28, 2020
- Official name: Pocono Organics 150 to Benefit Farm Aid
- Location: Blakeslee, Pennsylvania, Pocono Raceway
- Course: Permanent racing facility
- Course length: 2.5 miles (4.0 km)
- Distance: 60 laps, 150 mi (241.402 km)
- Scheduled distance: 60 laps, 150 mi (241.402 km)
- Average speed: 94.077 miles per hour (151.402 km/h)

Pole position
Driver	Johnny Sauter	ThorSport Racing
- Grid positions set by ballot

Most laps led
Driver	Sheldon Creed	GMS Racing
- Laps: 31

Winner
No. 51	Brandon Jones	Kyle Busch Motorsports

Television in the United States
- Network: Fox Sports 1
- Announcers: Vince Welch, Michael Waltrip, Todd Bodine

Radio in the United States
- Radio: Motor Racing Network

The 2020 Pocono Organics 150 to Benefit Farm Aid was the 6th stock car race of the 2020 NASCAR Gander RV & Outdoors Truck Series season, and the 11th iteration of the event. The race was postponed from Saturday, June 27, 2020 to the next day, Sunday, June 28, due to rain. The race was held in Blakeslee, Pennsylvania at Pocono Raceway, a 2.5 miles (4.0 km) triangular-shaped permanent racetrack. The race took 60 laps to complete. After a late race caution, Brandon Jones of Kyle Busch Motorsports would compete with Sheldon Creed for the win, eventually besting him to win the race, his first ever NASCAR Gander RV & Outdoors Truck Series. To fill the podium, Austin Hill of Hattori Racing Enterprises and Sheldon Creed of GMS Racing would finish 2nd and 3rd, respectively.

== Background ==
The layout of Pocono Raceway, the venue where the race was held.

=== Entry list ===
#	Driver	Team	Make
00	Josh Reaume	Reaume Brothers Racing	Toyota
2	Sheldon Creed	GMS Racing	Chevrolet
02	Tate Fogleman	Young's Motorsports	Chevrolet
3	Jordan Anderson	Jordan Anderson Racing	Chevrolet
4	Raphaël Lessard	Kyle Busch Motorsports	Toyota
04	Cory Roper	Roper Racing	Ford
6	Norm Benning	Norm Benning Racing	Chevrolet
7	Korbin Forrister	All Out Motorsports	Toyota
9	Codie Rohrbaugh	CR7 Motorsports	Chevrolet
10	Jennifer Jo Cobb	Jennifer Jo Cobb Racing	Chevrolet
11	Spencer Davis	Spencer Davis Motorsports	Toyota
13	Johnny Sauter	ThorSport Racing	Ford
15	Tanner Gray	DGR-Crosley	Ford
16	Austin Hill	Hattori Racing Enterprises	Toyota
18	Christian Eckes	Kyle Busch Motorsports	Toyota
19	Derek Kraus	McAnally–Hilgemann Racing	Toyota
20	Spencer Boyd	Young's Motorsports	Chevrolet
21	Zane Smith	GMS Racing	Chevrolet
22	Austin Wayne Self	AM Racing	Chevrolet
23	Brett Moffitt	GMS Racing	Chevrolet
24	Chase Purdy	GMS Racing	Chevrolet
26	Tyler Ankrum	GMS Racing	Chevrolet
28	Bryan Dauzat	FDNY Racing	Chevrolet
30	Brennan Poole	On Point Motorsports	Toyota
33	Jesse Iwuji	Reaume Brothers Racing	Toyota
38	Todd Gilliland	Front Row Motorsports	Ford
40	Ross Chastain	Niece Motorsports	Chevrolet
44	Natalie Decker*	Niece Motorsports	Chevrolet
45	Ty Majeski	Niece Motorsports	Chevrolet
49	Ray Ciccarelli	CMI Motorsports	Chevrolet
51	Brandon Jones	Kyle Busch Motorsports	Toyota
52	Stewart Friesen	Halmar Friesen Racing	Toyota
56	Tyler Hill	Hill Motorsports	Chevrolet
68	Clay Greenfield	Clay Greenfield Motorsports	Toyota
75	Parker Kligerman	Henderson Motorsports	Chevrolet
83	Tim Viens	CMI Motorsports	Chevrolet
88	Matt Crafton	ThorSport Racing	Ford
97	Robby Lyons	Diversified Motorsports Enterprises	Chevrolet
98	Grant Enfinger	ThorSport Racing	Ford
99	Ben Rhodes	ThorSport Racing	Ford
Official entry list

*Driver changed to Bayley Currey due to Natalie Decker being hospitalized for having gall bladder complications from surgery.

== Starting lineup ==
The starting lineup was based on a random draw. As a result, Johnny Sauter of ThorSport Racing won the pole.

Pos.	#	Driver	Team	Make
1	13	Johnny Sauter	ThorSport Racing	Ford
2	2	Sheldon Creed	GMS Racing	Chevrolet
3	16	Austin Hill	Hattori Racing Enterprises	Toyota
4	18	Christian Eckes	Kyle Busch Motorsports	Toyota
5	98	Grant Enfinger	ThorSport Racing	Ford
6	99	Ben Rhodes	ThorSport Racing	Ford
7	21	Zane Smith	GMS Racing	Chevrolet
8	38	Todd Gilliland	Front Row Motorsports	Ford
9	23	Brett Moffitt	GMS Racing	Chevrolet
10	51	Brandon Jones	Kyle Busch Motorsports	Toyota
11	26	Tyler Ankrum	GMS Racing	Chevrolet
12	24	Chase Purdy	GMS Racing	Chevrolet
13	19	Derek Kraus	McAnally–Hilgemann Racing	Toyota
14	4	Raphaël Lessard	Kyle Busch Motorsports	Toyota
15	15	Tanner Gray	DGR-Crosley	Ford
16	40	Ross Chastain	Niece Motorsports	Chevrolet
17	9	Codie Rohrbaugh	CR7 Motorsports	Chevrolet
18	88	Matt Crafton	ThorSport Racing	Ford
19	45	Ty Majeski	Niece Motorsports	Chevrolet
20	52	Stewart Friesen	Halmar Friesen Racing	Toyota
21	44	Bayley Currey	Niece Motorsports	Chevrolet
22	02	Tate Fogleman	Young's Motorsports	Chevrolet
23	22	Austin Wayne Self	AM Racing	Chevrolet
24	04	Cory Roper	Roper Racing	Ford
25	33	Jesse Iwuji	Reaume Brothers Racing	Toyota
26	7	Korbin Forrister	All Out Motorsports	Toyota
27	11	Spencer Davis	Spencer Davis Motorsports	Toyota
28	00	Josh Reaume	Reaume Brothers Racing	Toyota
29	30	Brennan Poole	On Point Motorsports	Toyota
30	56	Tyler Hill	Hill Motorsports	Chevrolet
31	20	Spencer Boyd	Young's Motorsports	Chevrolet
32	3	Jordan Anderson	Jordan Anderson Racing	Chevrolet
33	97	Robby Lyons	Diversified Motorsports Enterprises	Chevrolet
34	10	Jennifer Jo Cobb	Jennifer Jo Cobb Racing	Chevrolet
35	68	Clay Greenfield	Clay Greenfield Motorsports	Toyota
36	49	Ray Ciccarelli	CMI Motorsports	Chevrolet
37	83	Tim Viens	CMI Motorsports	Chevrolet
38	28	Bryan Dauzat	FDNY Racing	Chevrolet
39	6	Norm Benning	Norm Benning Racing	Chevrolet
40	75	Parker Kligerman	Henderson Motorsports	Chevrolet
Official starting lineup

== Race results ==
Stage 1 Laps: 15

Fin	#	Driver	Team	Make	Pts
1	2	Sheldon Creed	GMS Racing	Chevrolet	10
2	16	Austin Hill	Hattori Racing Enterprises	Toyota	9
3	26	Tyler Ankrum	GMS Racing	Chevrolet	8
4	51	Brandon Jones	Kyle Busch Motorsports	Toyota	0
5	38	Todd Gilliland	Front Row Motorsports	Ford	6
6	98	Grant Enfinger	ThorSport Racing	Ford	5
7	13	Johnny Sauter	ThorSport Racing	Ford	4
8	21	Zane Smith	GMS Racing	Chevrolet	3
9	40	Ross Chastain	Niece Motorsports	Chevrolet	0
10	99	Ben Rhodes	ThorSport Racing	Ford	1

Stage 2 Laps: 15

Fin	#	Driver	Team	Make	Pts
1	2	Sheldon Creed	GMS Racing	Chevrolet	10
2	18	Christian Eckes	Kyle Busch Motorsports	Toyota	9
3	99	Ben Rhodes	ThorSport Racing	Ford	8
4	52	Stewart Friesen	Halmar Friesen Racing	Toyota	7
5	15	Tanner Gray	DGR-Crosley	Ford	6
6	26	Tyler Ankrum	GMS Racing	Chevrolet	5
7	21	Zane Smith	GMS Racing	Chevrolet	4
8	23	Brett Moffitt	GMS Racing	Chevrolet	3
9	44	Bayley Currey	Niece Motorsports	Chevrolet	2
10	11	Spencer Davis	Spencer Davis Motorsports	Toyota	1

Stage 3 Laps: 30

Fin	St	#	Driver	Team	Make	Laps	Led	Status	Pts
1	10	51	Brandon Jones	Kyle Busch Motorsports	Toyota	60	11	running	0
2	3	16	Austin Hill	Hattori Racing Enterprises	Toyota	60	0	running	44
3	2	2	Sheldon Creed	GMS Racing	Chevrolet	60	31	running	54
4	8	38	Todd Gilliland	Front Row Motorsports	Ford	60	0	running	39
5	6	99	Ben Rhodes	ThorSport Racing	Ford	60	0	running	41
6	16	40	Ross Chastain	Niece Motorsports	Chevrolet	60	1	running	0
7	9	23	Brett Moffitt	GMS Racing	Chevrolet	60	0	running	33
8	20	52	Stewart Friesen	Halmar Friesen Racing	Toyota	60	0	running	36
9	11	26	Tyler Ankrum	GMS Racing	Chevrolet	60	0	running	41
10	13	19	Derek Kraus	McAnally–Hilgemann Racing	Toyota	60	0	running	27
11	5	98	Grant Enfinger	ThorSport Racing	Ford	60	0	running	31
12	15	15	Tanner Gray	DGR-Crosley	Ford	60	0	running	31
13	1	13	Johnny Sauter	ThorSport Racing	Ford	60	0	running	28
14	7	21	Zane Smith	GMS Racing	Chevrolet	60	7	running	30
15	40	75	Parker Kligerman	Henderson Motorsports	Chevrolet	60	0	running	22
16	21	44	Bayley Currey	Niece Motorsports	Chevrolet	60	0	running	23
17	32	3	Jordan Anderson	Jordan Anderson Racing	Chevrolet	60	0	running	20
18	27	11	Spencer Davis	Spencer Davis Motorsports	Toyota	60	0	running	20
19	30	56	Tyler Hill	Hill Motorsports	Chevrolet	60	0	running	18
20	33	97	Robby Lyons	Diversified Motorsports Enterprises	Chevrolet	60	0	running	0
21	12	24	Chase Purdy	GMS Racing	Chevrolet	60	0	running	0
22	31	20	Spencer Boyd	Young's Motorsports	Chevrolet	60	0	running	15
23	28	00	Josh Reaume	Reaume Brothers Racing	Toyota	60	0	running	14
24	26	7	Korbin Forrister	All Out Motorsports	Toyota	60	0	running	13
25	24	04	Cory Roper	Roper Racing	Ford	60	0	running	12
26	38	28	Bryan Dauzat	FDNY Racing	Chevrolet	60	0	running	11
27	36	49	Ray Ciccarelli	CMI Motorsports	Chevrolet	60	0	running	10
28	25	33	Jesse Iwuji	Reaume Brothers Racing	Toyota	60	0	running	9
29	37	83	Tim Viens	CMI Motorsports	Chevrolet	59	0	running	8
30	39	6	Norm Benning	Norm Benning Racing	Chevrolet	59	0	running	7
31	35	68	Clay Greenfield	Clay Greenfield Motorsports	Toyota	58	0	running	6
32	34	10	Jennifer Jo Cobb	Jennifer Jo Cobb Racing	Chevrolet	54	0	running	5
33	4	18	Christian Eckes	Kyle Busch Motorsports	Toyota	48	10	crash	14
34	22	02	Tate Fogleman	Young's Motorsports	Chevrolet	34	0	crash	5
35	29	30	Brennan Poole	On Point Motorsports	Toyota	23	0	dvp	0
36	19	45	Ty Majeski	Niece Motorsports	Chevrolet	11	0	crash	5
37	14	4	Raphaël Lessard	Kyle Busch Motorsports	Toyota	5	0	crash	5
38	23	22	Austin Wayne Self	AM Racing	Chevrolet	5	0	crash	5
39	17	9	Codie Rohrbaugh	CR7 Motorsports	Chevrolet	0	0	crash	5
40	18	88	Matt Crafton	ThorSport Racing	Ford	0	0	crash	5
Official race results

Previous race: 2020 Baptist Health 200	NASCAR Gander RV & Outdoors Truck Series; 2020 season	Next race: 2020 Buckle Up In Your Truck 225
