= John Atwell (racing driver) =

American racing driver

- Born: John D. Atwell; May 7, 1973 (age 53); Azle, Texas, U.S.

NASCAR FedEx Freight Truck Series career
- 2021 position: 122nd
- Best finish: 122nd (2021)
Wins	Top tens	Poles
0	0	0
- Statistics up to date as of June 8, 2022.

John D. Atwell (born May 7, 1973) is an American professional racing driver. He last competed full-time in the Trans-Am Series, driving the No. 02 Chevrolet Camaro, as well as part-time in the NASCAR Camping World Truck Series, driving the No. 79 Chevrolet Silverado, both for his own team, Atwell Racing.

== Racing career ==
Atwell races full-time in the Trans-Am Series. Due to having experience at the Circuit of the Americas, when NASCAR made its debut there, CMI Motorsports brought in Atwell to make his NASCAR Camping World Truck Series debut in the No. 49 truck. However, he posted the 41st fastest time in qualifying, which was not enough to make the race.

Atwell returned to attempt the Truck Series race at COTA in 2022, this time with his own team, which fielded the No. 79 truck, and again failed to qualify.

== Motorsports career results ==
=== NASCAR ===
(key) (Bold – Pole position awarded by qualifying time. Italics – Pole position earned by points standings or practice time. * – Most laps led.)

==== Camping World Truck Series ====
NASCAR Camping World Truck Series results
Year	Team	No.	Make	1	2	3	4	5	6	7	8	9	10	11	12	13	14	15	16	17	18	19	20	21	22	23	NCWTS	Pts	Ref
2021	CMI Motorsports	49	Ford	DAY	DAY	LVS	ATL	BRD	RCH	KAN	DAR	COA; DNQ	CLT	TEX	NSH	POC	KNX	GLN	GTW	DAR	BRI	LVS	TAL	MAR	PHO		122nd	0	
2022	Atwell Racing	79	Chevy	DAY	LVS	ATL	COA; DNQ	MAR	BRD	DAR	KAN	TEX	CLT	GTW	SON	KNO	NSH	MOH	POC	IRP	RCH	KAN	BRI	TAL	HOM	PHO	108th	0	

^{*} Season still in progress
