= 2020 Blue-Emu Maximum Pain Relief 200 =

Race details
- Race 9 of 23 of the 2020 NASCAR Gander RV & Outdoors Truck Series
- Date: July 24, 2020
- Official name: Blue-Emu Maximum Pain Relief 200
- Location: Kansas City, Kansas, Kansas Speedway
- Course: Permanent racing facility
- Course length: 1.5 miles (2.41 km)
- Distance: 134 laps, 201 mi (323.477 km)
- Average speed: 126.349 miles per hour (203.339 km/h)

Pole position
Driver	Christian Eckes	Kyle Busch Motorsports
- Grid positions set by car number

Most laps led
Driver	Austin Hill	Hattori Racing Enterprises
- Laps: 65

Winner
No. 16	Austin Hill	Hattori Racing Enterprises

Television in the United States
- Network: Fox Sports 1
- Announcers: Vince Welch, Michael Waltrip, and Jamie McMurray

Radio in the United States
- Radio: Motor Racing Network

The 2020 Blue-Emu Maximum Pain Relief 200 was the 9th stock car race of the 2020 NASCAR Gander RV & Outdoors Truck Series season, and the 20th iteration of the event. The race was originally supposed to be held on May 30, 2020, but was postponed to July 24, 2020, due to the COVID-19 pandemic. The race was held in Kansas City, Kansas at Kansas Speedway, a 1.5 miles (2.4 km) permanent D-shaped oval racetrack. The race took the scheduled 134 laps to complete. At race's end, Austin Hill of Hattori Racing Enterprises would dominate the race and win, the 5th win of his career in the NASCAR Gander RV & Outdoors Truck Series, and the first of the season. To fill the podium, Brett Moffitt of GMS Racing and Grant Enfinger of ThorSport Racing would finish 2nd and 3rd, respectively.

== Background ==
The layout of Kansas Speedway, the venue where the race was held.

Kansas Speedway is a 1.5-mile (2.4 km) tri-oval race track in Kansas City, Kansas. It was built in 2001 and hosts two annual NASCAR race weekends. The NTT IndyCar Series also raced there until 2011. The speedway is owned and operated by the International Speedway Corporation.

=== Entry list ===
#	Driver	Team	Make
00	Dawson Cram	Reaume Brothers Racing	Toyota
2	Sheldon Creed	GMS Racing	Chevrolet
02	Tate Fogleman	Young's Motorsports	Chevrolet
3	Jordan Anderson	Jordan Anderson Racing	Chevrolet
4	Raphaël Lessard	Kyle Busch Motorsports	Toyota
04	Cory Roper	Roper Racing	Ford
6	Norm Benning	Norm Benning Racing	Chevrolet
7	Korbin Forrister	All Out Motorsports	Toyota
9	Codie Rohrbaugh	CR7 Motorsports	Chevrolet
10	Jennifer Jo Cobb	Jennifer Jo Cobb Racing	Chevrolet
11	Spencer Davis	Spencer Davis Motorsports	Toyota
13	Johnny Sauter	ThorSport Racing	Ford
15	Tanner Gray	DGR-Crosley	Ford
16	Austin Hill	Hattori Racing Enterprises	Toyota
18	Christian Eckes	Kyle Busch Motorsports	Toyota
19	Derek Kraus	McAnally–Hilgemann Racing	Toyota
20	Spencer Boyd	Young's Motorsports	Chevrolet
21	Zane Smith	GMS Racing	Chevrolet
22	Austin Wayne Self	AM Racing	Chevrolet
23	Brett Moffitt	GMS Racing	Chevrolet
24	Chase Purdy	GMS Racing	Chevrolet
26	Tyler Ankrum	GMS Racing	Chevrolet
28	Bryan Dauzat	FDNY Racing	Chevrolet
30	Brennan Poole	On Point Motorsports	Toyota
33	Kevin Donahue	Reaume Brothers Racing	Toyota
38	Todd Gilliland	Front Row Motorsports	Ford
40	Ross Chastain	Niece Motorsports	Chevrolet
44	Natalie Decker	Niece Motorsports	Chevrolet
45	Ty Majeski	Niece Motorsports	Chevrolet
49	Tim Viens*	CMI Motorsports	Chevrolet
51	Brandon Jones	Kyle Busch Motorsports	Toyota
52	Stewart Friesen	Halmar Friesen Racing	Toyota
56	Timmy Hill	Hill Motorsports	Chevrolet
68	Clay Greenfield	Clay Greenfield Motorsports	Toyota
83	Ray Ciccarelli*	CMI Motorsports	Chevrolet
88	Matt Crafton	ThorSport Racing	Ford
97	Robby Lyons	Diversified Motorsports Enterprises	Chevrolet
98	Grant Enfinger	ThorSport Racing	Ford
99	Ben Rhodes	ThorSport Racing	Ford
Official entry list

*Originally, Viens was slated to drive the #49, but the driver would change to Ray Ciccarelli for unknown reasons. As a result, the #83 would withdraw.

== Starting lineup ==
The starting lineup was determined by a random draw. Christian Eckes of Kyle Busch Motorsports would draw for the pole.

Pos.	#	Driver	Team	Make
1	18	Christian Eckes	Kyle Busch Motorsports	Toyota
2	23	Brett Moffitt	GMS Racing	Chevrolet
3	38	Todd Gilliland	Front Row Motorsports	Ford
4	51	Brandon Jones	Kyle Busch Motorsports	Toyota
5	99	Ben Rhodes	ThorSport Racing	Ford
6	16	Austin Hill	Hattori Racing Enterprises	Toyota
7	21	Zane Smith	GMS Racing	Chevrolet
8	98	Grant Enfinger	ThorSport Racing	Ford
9	26	Tyler Ankrum	GMS Racing	Chevrolet
10	2	Sheldon Creed	GMS Racing	Chevrolet
11	40	Ross Chastain	Niece Motorsports	Chevrolet
12	4	Raphaël Lessard	Kyle Busch Motorsports	Toyota
13	15	Tanner Gray	DGR-Crosley	Ford
14	52	Stewart Friesen	Halmar Friesen Racing	Toyota
15	19	Derek Kraus	McAnally–Hilgemann Racing	Toyota
16	24	Chase Purdy	GMS Racing	Chevrolet
17	88	Matt Crafton	ThorSport Racing	Ford
18	13	Johnny Sauter	ThorSport Racing	Ford
19	45	Ty Majeski	Niece Motorsports	Chevrolet
20	11	Spencer Davis	Spencer Davis Motorsports	Toyota
21	44	Natalie Decker	Niece Motorsports	Chevrolet
22	33	Kevin Donahue	Reaume Brothers Racing	Toyota
23	22	Austin Wayne Self	AM Racing	Chevrolet
24	56	Timmy Hill	Hill Motorsports	Chevrolet
25	30	Brennan Poole	On Point Motorsports	Toyota
26	00	Dawson Cram	Reaume Brothers Racing	Toyota
27	04	Cory Roper	Roper Racing	Ford
28	02	Tate Fogleman	Young's Motorsports	Chevrolet
29	9	Codie Rohrbaugh	CR7 Motorsports	Chevrolet
30	20	Spencer Boyd	Young's Motorsports	Chevrolet
31	7	Korbin Forrister	All Out Motorsports	Toyota
32	3	Jordan Anderson	Jordan Anderson Racing	Chevrolet
33	68	Clay Greenfield	Clay Greenfield Motorsports	Toyota
34	97	Robby Lyons	Diversified Motorsports Enterprises	Chevrolet
35	49	Ray Ciccarelli	CMI Motorsports	Chevrolet
36	10	Jennifer Jo Cobb	Jennifer Jo Cobb Racing	Chevrolet
37	28	Bryan Dauzat	FDNY Racing	Chevrolet
38	6	Norm Benning	Norm Benning Racing	Chevrolet
Official starting lineup

== Race results ==
Stage 1 Laps: 30

Fin	#	Driver	Team	Make	Pts
1	23	Brett Moffitt	GMS Racing	Chevrolet	10
2	16	Austin Hill	Hattori Racing Enterprises	Toyota	9
3	40	Ross Chastain	Niece Motorsports	Chevrolet	0
4	38	Todd Gilliland	Front Row Motorsports	Ford	7
5	88	Matt Crafton	ThorSport Racing	Ford	6
6	19	Derek Kraus	McAnally–Hilgemann Racing	Toyota	5
7	18	Christian Eckes	Kyle Busch Motorsports	Toyota	4
8	21	Zane Smith	GMS Racing	Chevrolet	3
9	99	Ben Rhodes	ThorSport Racing	Ford	2
10	2	Sheldon Creed	GMS Racing	Chevrolet	1

Stage 2 Laps: 30

Fin	#	Driver	Team	Make	Pts
1	16	Austin Hill	Hattori Racing Enterprises	Toyota	10
2	99	Ben Rhodes	ThorSport Racing	Ford	9
3	21	Zane Smith	GMS Racing	Chevrolet	8
4	45	Ty Majeski	Niece Motorsports	Chevrolet	7
5	19	Derek Kraus	McAnally–Hilgemann Racing	Toyota	6
6	18	Christian Eckes	Kyle Busch Motorsports	Toyota	5
7	40	Ross Chastain	Niece Motorsports	Chevrolet	0
8	2	Sheldon Creed	GMS Racing	Chevrolet	3
9	51	Brandon Jones	Kyle Busch Motorsports	Toyota	0
10	15	Tanner Gray	DGR-Crosley	Ford	1

Stage 3 Laps: 74

Fin	St	#	Driver	Team	Make	Laps	Led	Status	Pts
1	6	16	Austin Hill	Hattori Racing Enterprises	Toyota	134	65	running	59
2	2	23	Brett Moffitt	GMS Racing	Chevrolet	134	21	running	45
3	8	98	Grant Enfinger	ThorSport Racing	Ford	134	0	running	34
4	17	88	Matt Crafton	ThorSport Racing	Ford	134	2	running	39
5	15	19	Derek Kraus	McAnally–Hilgemann Racing	Toyota	134	0	running	43
6	7	21	Zane Smith	GMS Racing	Chevrolet	134	17	running	42
7	5	99	Ben Rhodes	ThorSport Racing	Ford	134	3	running	41
8	10	2	Sheldon Creed	GMS Racing	Chevrolet	134	0	running	33
9	18	13	Johnny Sauter	ThorSport Racing	Ford	134	0	running	28
10	3	38	Todd Gilliland	Front Row Motorsports	Ford	134	15	running	34
11	19	45	Ty Majeski	Niece Motorsports	Chevrolet	134	0	running	33
12	25	30	Brennan Poole	On Point Motorsports	Toyota	134	0	running	0
13	1	18	Christian Eckes	Kyle Busch Motorsports	Toyota	134	10	running	33
14	4	51	Brandon Jones	Kyle Busch Motorsports	Toyota	134	0	running	0
15	16	24	Chase Purdy	GMS Racing	Chevrolet	134	0	running	22
16	12	4	Raphaël Lessard	Kyle Busch Motorsports	Toyota	134	0	running	21
17	23	22	Austin Wayne Self	AM Racing	Chevrolet	134	0	running	20
18	13	15	Tanner Gray	DGR-Crosley	Ford	134	0	running	20
19	24	56	Timmy Hill	Hill Motorsports	Chevrolet	133	0	running	18
20	27	04	Cory Roper	Roper Racing	Ford	133	0	running	17
21	21	44	Natalie Decker	Niece Motorsports	Chevrolet	133	0	running	16
22	28	02	Tate Fogleman	Young's Motorsports	Chevrolet	133	0	running	15
23	30	20	Spencer Boyd	Young's Motorsports	Chevrolet	133	0	running	14
24	29	9	Codie Rohrbaugh	CR7 Motorsports	Chevrolet	133	0	running	13
25	26	00	Dawson Cram	Reaume Brothers Racing	Toyota	133	0	running	12
26	34	97	Robby Lyons	Diversified Motorsports Enterprises	Chevrolet	132	0	running	0
27	14	52	Stewart Friesen	Halmar Friesen Racing	Toyota	132	0	running	10
28	33	68	Clay Greenfield	Clay Greenfield Motorsports	Toyota	132	0	running	9
29	20	11	Spencer Davis	Spencer Davis Motorsports	Toyota	131	0	dvp	8
30	32	3	Jordan Anderson	Jordan Anderson Racing	Chevrolet	129	0	running	7
31	36	10	Jennifer Jo Cobb	Jennifer Jo Cobb Racing	Chevrolet	128	0	running	6
32	35	49	Ray Ciccarelli	CMI Motorsports	Chevrolet	121	0	running	5
33	9	26	Tyler Ankrum	GMS Racing	Chevrolet	112	0	running	5
34	11	40	Ross Chastain	Niece Motorsports	Chevrolet	102	1	brakes	0
35	31	7	Korbin Forrister	All Out Motorsports	Toyota	80	0	crash	5
36	38	6	Norm Benning	Norm Benning Racing	Chevrolet	50	0	handling	5
37	37	28	Bryan Dauzat	FDNY Racing	Chevrolet	26	0	dvp	5
38	22	33	Kevin Donahue	Reaume Brothers Racing	Toyota	17	0	power steering	5
Official race results

Previous race: 2020 Vankor 350	NASCAR Gander RV & Outdoors Truck Series; 2020 season	Next race: 2020 E.P.T. 200
