= 2022 Pinty's Truck Race on Dirt =

Sixth race of the 2022 NASCAR Camping World Truck Series

Race details
- Race 6 of 23 of the 2022 NASCAR Camping World Truck Series
- Date: April 16, 2022
- Official name: Second Annual Pinty's Truck Race on Dirt
- Location: Bristol Motor Speedway Dirt Oval, Bristol, Tennessee
- Course: Permanent racing facility
- Course length: 0.533 miles (0.858 km)
- Distance: 150 laps, 79.95 mi (169.302 km)
- Scheduled distance: 150 laps, 79.95 mi (169.302 km)
- Average speed: 45.957 mph (73.961 km/h)

Pole position
Driver	Joey Logano	David Gilliland Racing
- Grid positions set by heat results

Most laps led
Driver	Ben Rhodes	ThorSport Racing
- Laps: 95

Winner
No. 99	Ben Rhodes	ThorSport Racing

Television in the United States
- Network: Fox Sports 1
- Announcers: Vince Welch, Kurt Busch, Michael Waltrip

Radio in the United States
- Radio: Motor Racing Network

The 2022 Pinty's Truck Race on Dirt was the sixth stock car race of the 2022 NASCAR Camping World Truck Series and the second iteration of the event. The race was held on Saturday, April 16, 2022, at a dirt version of Bristol Motor Speedway in Bristol, Tennessee, a 0.553 miles (0.890 km) permanent oval-shaped short track. The race was contested over 150 laps. Ben Rhodes of ThorSport Racing would win the race, after passing Carson Hocevar for the lead with 4 laps to go. He would also win both stages, and lead 95 laps. This was Rhodes' sixth career truck series win, and his first of the season. To fill out the podium, Carson Hocevar of Niece Motorsports and John Hunter Nemechek of Kyle Busch Motorsports would finish 2nd and 3rd, respectively.

This was the debut race for 2021 USAC National Midget Series champion, Buddy Kofoid.

== Background ==
Bristol Motor Speedway, formerly known as Bristol International Raceway and Bristol Raceway, is a NASCAR short track venue located in Bristol, Tennessee. Constructed in 1960, it held its first NASCAR race on July 30, 1961. Despite its short length, Bristol is among the most popular tracks on the NASCAR schedule because of its distinct features, which include extraordinarily steep banking, an all concrete surface, two pit roads, and stadium-like seating.

In 2021, the race shifted to a dirt surface version of the track and was renamed the Pinty's Truck Race on Dirt. On January 25, 2021, NASCAR announced the stage lengths of all events in all three series. According to the stage lengths, it states the race will consist of 150 laps.

=== Entry list ===
- (R) denotes rookie driver.
- (i) denotes driver who is ineligible for series driver points.

#	Driver	Team	Make
1	Hailie Deegan	David Gilliland Racing	Ford
02	Kaz Grala	Young's Motorsports	Chevrolet
4	John Hunter Nemechek	Kyle Busch Motorsports	Toyota
6	Norm Benning	Norm Benning Racing	Chevrolet
7	Chase Elliott (i)	Spire Motorsports	Chevrolet
9	Blaine Perkins (R)	CR7 Motorsports	Chevrolet
12	Spencer Boyd	Young's Motorsports	Chevrolet
15	Tanner Gray	David Gilliland Racing	Ford
16	Tyler Ankrum	Hattori Racing Enterprises	Toyota
17	Harrison Burton (i)	David Gilliland Racing	Ford
18	Chandler Smith	Kyle Busch Motorsports	Toyota
19	Derek Kraus	McAnally–Hilgemann Racing	Chevrolet
20	Austin Dillon (i)	Young's Motorsports	Chevrolet
22	Austin Wayne Self	AM Racing	Chevrolet
23	Grant Enfinger	GMS Racing	Chevrolet
24	Jack Wood (R)	GMS Racing	Chevrolet
25	Matt DiBenedetto	Rackley W.A.R.	Chevrolet
30	Tate Fogleman	On Point Motorsports	Toyota
33	Mike Marlar	Reaume Brothers Racing	Toyota
38	Zane Smith	Front Row Motorsports	Ford
40	Dean Thompson (R)	Niece Motorsports	Chevrolet
42	Carson Hocevar	Niece Motorsports	Chevrolet
43	Keith McGee	Reaume Brothers Racing	Chevrolet
44	Kris Wright	Niece Motorsports	Chevrolet
45	Lawless Alan (R)	Niece Motorsports	Chevrolet
49	Andrew Gordon	CMI Motorsports*	Ford
51	Buddy Kofoid	Kyle Busch Motorsports	Toyota
52	Stewart Friesen	Halmar Friesen Racing	Toyota
54	Joey Logano (i)	David Gilliland Racing	Ford
56	Timmy Hill	Hill Motorsports	Toyota
61	Chase Purdy	Hattori Racing Enterprises	Toyota
62	Jessica Friesen	Halmar Friesen Racing	Toyota
66	Ty Majeski	ThorSport Racing	Toyota
75	Parker Kligerman	Henderson Motorsports	Chevrolet
88	Matt Crafton	ThorSport Racing	Toyota
91	Colby Howard	McAnally–Hilgemann Racing	Chevrolet
98	Christian Eckes	ThorSport Racing	Toyota
99	Ben Rhodes	ThorSport Racing	Toyota
Official entry list

*Originally, Gordon was slated to run the #46 car under the G2G Racing name. However, the team had bought a chassis from CMI Motorsports, which was not then not transferred to be registered for the G2G Racing team. Facing withdrawal, G2G Racing owner Tim Viens begged CMI Motorsports owner, Ray Ciccarelli, to be able to use the CMI Motorsports name, as the team had withdrawn from all NASCAR racing and had only been scheduled to do local dirt track racing.

== Practice ==
=== First practice ===
The first 50-minute practice session was held on Friday, April 15, at 3:05 PM EST. Stewart Friesen of Halmar Friesen Racing would set the fastest time in the session, with a time of 19.369 seconds and a speed of 92.932 mph (149.560 km/h).

Pos.	#	Driver	Team	Make	Time	Speed
1	52	Stewart Friesen	Halmar Friesen Racing	Toyota	19.369	92.932
2	99	Ben Rhodes	ThorSport Racing	Toyota	19.394	92.812
3	19	Derek Kraus	McAnally–Hilgemann Racing	Chevrolet	19.436	92.612
Full first practice results

=== Final practice ===
The final 50-minute practice session was held on Friday, April 15, at 5:35 PM EST. Joey Logano of David Gilliland Racing would set the fastest time in the session, with a time of 19.779 seconds and a speed of 91.006 mph (146.460 km/h).

Pos.	#	Driver	Team	Make	Time	Speed
1	54	Joey Logano (i)	David Gilliland Racing	Ford	19.779	91.006
2	99	Ben Rhodes	ThorSport Racing	Toyota	19.837	90.740
3	88	Matt Crafton	ThorSport Racing	Toyota	19.861	90.630
Full final practice results

== Qualifying ==
Qualifying was held on Saturday, April 16, at 4:30 PM EST. For qualifying, drivers will be split into four different 15 lap heat races, and their finishing position will determine the starting lineup. Austin Dillon, Ty Majeski, Joey Logano, and Chandler Smith would win the four races.

=== Race 1 ===
Fin.	St	#	Driver	Team	Make	Laps	Led	Status
1	1	20	Austin Dillon (i)	Young's Motorsports	Chevrolet	15	15	Running
2	5	75	Parker Kligerman	Henderson Motorsports	Chevrolet	15	0	Running
3	4	91	Colby Howard	McAnally–Hilgemann Racing	Chevrolet	15	0	Running
4	3	49	Andrew Gordon	CMI Motorsports	Ford	15	0	Running
5	8	22	Austin Wayne Self	AM Racing	Chevrolet	15	0	Running
6	10	24	Jack Wood (R)	GMS Racing	Chevrolet	15	0	Running
7	6	9	Blaine Perkins (R)	CR7 Motorsports	Chevrolet	15	0	Running
8	7	56	Timmy Hill	Hill Motorsports	Toyota	15	0	Running
9	9	51	Buddy Kofoid	Kyle Busch Motorsports	Toyota	11	0	Running
10	2	15	Tanner Gray	David Gilliland Racing	Ford	10	0	Running
Official Race 1 results

=== Race 2 ===
Fin.	St	#	Driver	Team	Make	Laps	Led	Status
1	1	66	Ty Majeski	ThorSport Racing	Toyota	15	15	Running
2	4	42	Carson Hocevar	Niece Motorsports	Chevrolet	15	0	Running
3	3	88	Matt Crafton	ThorSport Racing	Toyota	15	0	Running
4	2	16	Tyler Ankrum	Hattori Racing Enterprises	Toyota	15	0	Running
5	5	30	Tate Fogleman	On Point Motorsports	Toyota	15	0	Running
6	8	38	Zane Smith	Front Row Motorsports	Ford	15	0	Running
7	10	33	Mike Marlar	Reaume Brothers Racing	Toyota	15	0	Running
8	6	45	Lawless Alan (R)	Niece Motorsports	Chevrolet	15	0	Running
9	9	61	Chase Purdy	Hattori Racing Enterprises	Toyota	15	0	Running
10	7	43	Keith McGee	Reaume Brothers Racing	Chevrolet	15	0	Running
Official Race 2 results

=== Race 3 ===
Fin.	St	#	Driver	Team	Make	Laps	Led	Status
1	6	54	Joey Logano (i)	David Gilliland Racing	Ford	15	8	Running
2	7	99	Ben Rhodes	ThorSport Racing	Toyota	15	0	Running
3	2	23	Grant Enfinger	GMS Racing	Chevrolet	15	7	Running
4	3	98	Christian Eckes	ThorSport Racing	Toyota	15	0	Running
5	9	25	Matt DiBenedetto	Rackley W.A.R.	Chevrolet	15	0	Running
6	1	02	Kaz Grala	Young's Motorsports	Chevrolet	15	0	Running
7	4	1	Hailie Deegan	David Gilliland Racing	Ford	15	0	Running
8	5	44	Kris Wright	Niece Motorsports	Chevrolet	15	0	Running
9	8	6	Norm Benning	Norm Benning Racing	Chevrolet	15	0	Running
Official Race 3 results

=== Race 4 ===
Fin.	St	#	Driver	Team	Make	Laps	Led	Status
1	2	18	Chandler Smith	Kyle Busch Motorsports	Toyota	15	15	Running
2	4	7	Chase Elliott (i)	Spire Motorsports	Chevrolet	15	0	Running
3	3	19	Derek Kraus	McAnally–Hilgemann Racing	Chevrolet	15	0	Running
4	9	52	Stewart Friesen	Halmar Friesen Racing	Toyota	15	0	Running
5	6	4	John Hunter Nemechek	Kyle Busch Motorsports	Toyota	15	0	Running
6	7	17	Harrison Burton (i)	David Gilliland Racing	Ford	15	0	Running
7	1	40	Dean Thompson (R)	Niece Motorsports	Chevrolet	15	0	Running
8	8	62	Jessica Friesen	Halmar Friesen Racing	Toyota	15	0	Running
9	5	12	Spencer Boyd	Young's Motorsports	Chevrolet	15	0	Running
Official Race 4 results

=== Starting lineup ===
Pos.	#	Driver	Team	Make
1	54	Joey Logano (i)	David Gilliland Racing	Ford
2	99	Ben Rhodes	ThorSport Racing	Toyota
3	52	Stewart Friesen	Halmar Friesen Racing	Toyota
4	75	Parker Kligerman	Henderson Motorsports	Chevrolet
5	18	Chandler Smith	Kyle Busch Motorsports	Toyota
6	42	Carson Hocevar	Niece Motorsports	Chevrolet
7	7	Chase Elliott (i)	Spire Motorsports	Chevrolet
8	66	Ty Majeski	ThorSport Racing	Toyota
9	25	Matt DiBenedetto	Rackley W.A.R.	Chevrolet
10	20	Austin Dillon (i)	Young's Motorsports	Chevrolet
11	22	Austin Wayne Self	AM Racing	Chevrolet
12	91	Colby Howard	McAnally–Hilgemann Racing	Chevrolet
13	24	Jack Wood (R)	GMS Racing	Chevrolet
14	88	Matt Crafton	ThorSport Racing	Toyota
15	19	Derek Kraus	McAnally–Hilgemann Racing	Chevrolet
16	23	Grant Enfinger	GMS Racing	Chevrolet
17	38	Zane Smith	Front Row Motorsports	Ford
18	4	John Hunter Nemechek	Kyle Busch Motorsports	Toyota
19	98	Christian Eckes	ThorSport Racing	Toyota
20	16	Tyler Ankrum	Hattori Racing Enterprises	Toyota
21	33	Mike Marlar	Reaume Brothers Racing	Toyota
22	49	Andrew Gordon	CMI Motorsports	Ford
23	17	Harrison Burton (i)	David Gilliland Racing	Ford
24	30	Tate Fogleman	On Point Motorsports	Chevrolet
25	02	Kaz Grala	Young's Motorsports	Chevrolet
26	1	Hailie Deegan	David Gilliland Racing	Ford
27	40	Dean Thompson (R)	Niece Motorsports	Chevrolet
28	9	Blaine Perkins (R)	CR7 Motorsports	Chevrolet
29	56	Timmy Hill	Hill Motorsports	Toyota
30	44	Kris Wright	Niece Motorsports	Chevrolet
31	45	Lawless Alan (R)	Niece Motorsports	Chevrolet
Qualified by owner's points
32	51	Buddy Kofoid	Kyle Busch Motorsports	Toyota
33	61	Chase Purdy	Hattori Racing Enterprises	Toyota
34	12	Spencer Boyd	Young's Motorsports	Chevrolet
35	15	Tanner Gray	David Gilliland Racing	Ford
36	43	Keith McGee	Reaume Brothers Racing	Chevrolet
Failed to qualify
37	62	Jessica Friesen	Halmar Friesen Racing	Toyota
38	6	Norm Benning	Norm Benning Racing	Chevrolet
Official starting lineup

== Race results ==
Stage 1 Laps: 40

Pos.	#	Driver	Team	Make	Pts
1	99	Ben Rhodes	ThorSport Racing	Toyota	10
2	66	Ty Majeski	ThorSport Racing	Toyota	9
3	52	Stewart Friesen	Halmar Friesen Racing	Toyota	8
4	54	Joey Logano (i)	David Gilliland Racing	Ford	0
5	18	Chandler Smith	Kyle Busch Motorsports	Toyota	6
6	75	Parker Kligerman	Henderson Motorsports	Chevrolet	5
7	7	Chase Elliott (i)	Spire Motorsports	Chevrolet	0
8	88	Matt Crafton	ThorSport Racing	Toyota	3
9	42	Carson Hocevar	Niece Motorsports	Chevrolet	2
10	25	Matt DiBenedetto	Rackley W.A.R.	Chevrolet	1

Stage 2 Laps: 50

Pos.	#	Driver	Team	Make	Pts
1	99	Ben Rhodes	ThorSport Racing	Toyota	10
2	66	Ty Majeski	ThorSport Racing	Toyota	9
3	4	John Hunter Nemechek	Kyle Busch Motorsports	Toyota	8
4	75	Parker Kligerman	Henderson Motorsports	Chevrolet	7
5	54	Joey Logano (i)	David Gilliland Racing	Ford	0
6	7	Chase Elliott (i)	Spire Motorsports	Chevrolet	0
7	51	Buddy Kofoid	Kyle Busch Motorsports	Toyota	4
8	42	Carson Hocevar	Niece Motorsports	Chevrolet	3
9	18	Chandler Smith	Kyle Busch Motorsports	Toyota	2
10	19	Derek Kraus	McAnally–Hilgemann Racing	Chevrolet	1

Stage 3 Laps: 60

Fin.	St	#	Driver	Team	Make	Laps	Led	Status	Points
1	2	99	Ben Rhodes	ThorSport Racing	Toyota	150	95	Running	60
2	6	42	Carson Hocevar	Niece Motorsports	Chevrolet	150	55	Running	40
3	18	4	John Hunter Nemechek	Kyle Busch Motorsports	Toyota	150	0	Running	42
4	4	75	Parker Kligerman	Henderson Motorsports	Chevrolet	150	0	Running	45
5	19	98	Christian Eckes	ThorSport Racing	Toyota	150	0	Running	32
6	1	54	Joey Logano (i)	David Gilliland Racing	Ford	150	0	Running	0
7	7	7	Chase Elliott (i)	Spire Motorsports	Chevrolet	150	0	Running	0
8	16	23	Grant Enfinger	GMS Racing	Chevrolet	150	0	Running	29
9	14	88	Matt Crafton	ThorSport Racing	Toyota	150	0	Running	31
10	17	38	Zane Smith	Front Row Motorsports	Ford	150	0	Running	27
11	3	52	Stewart Friesen	Halmar Friesen Racing	Toyota	150	0	Running	34
12	12	91	Colby Howard	McAnally–Hilgemann Racing	Chevrolet	150	0	Running	25
13	33	61	Chase Purdy	Hattori Racing Enterprises	Toyota	150	0	Running	24
14	10	20	Austin Dillon (i)	Young's Motorsports	Chevrolet	150	0	Running	0
15	35	15	Tanner Gray	David Gilliland Racing	Ford	150	0	Running	22
16	27	40	Dean Thompson (R)	Niece Motorsports	Chevrolet	150	0	Running	21
17	21	33	Mike Marlar	Reaume Brothers Racing	Toyota	150	0	Running	20
18	26	1	Hailie Deegan	David Gilliland Racing	Ford	150	0	Running	19
19	5	18	Chandler Smith	Kyle Busch Motorsports	Toyota	150	0	Running	26
20	23	17	Harrison Burton (i)	David Gilliland Racing	Ford	150	0	Running	0
21	8	66	Ty Majeski	ThorSport Racing	Toyota	150	0	Running	34
22	13	24	Jack Wood (R)	GMS Racing	Chevrolet	150	0	Running	15
23	29	56	Timmy Hill	Hill Motorsports	Toyota	150	0	Running	14
24	34	12	Spencer Boyd	Young's Motorsports	Chevrolet	150	0	Running	13
25	28	9	Blaine Perkins (R)	CR7 Motorsports	Chevrolet	150	0	Running	12
26	25	02	Kaz Grala	Young's Motorsports	Chevrolet	150	0	Running	11
27	32	51	Buddy Kofoid	Kyle Busch Motorsports	Toyota	150	0	Running	14
28	24	30	Tate Fogleman	On Point Motorsports	Toyota	149	0	Running	9
29	15	19	Derek Kraus	McAnally–Hilgemann Racing	Chevrolet	149	0	Running	9
30	31	45	Lawless Alan (R)	Niece Motorsports	Chevrolet	149	0	Running	7
31	20	16	Tyler Ankrum	Hattori Racing Enterprises	Toyota	147	0	Running	6
32	22	49	Andrew Gordon	CMI Motorsports	Ford	146	0	Running	5
33	30	44	Kris Wright	Niece Motorsports	Chevrolet	146	0	Running	4
34	36	43	Keith McGee	Reaume Brothers Racing	Chevrolet	146	0	Running	3
35	9	25	Matt DiBenedetto	Rackley W.A.R.	Chevrolet	145	0	Running	3
36	11	22	Austin Wayne Self	AM Racing	Chevrolet	143	0	Running	1
Official race results

== Standings after the race ==
Drivers' Championship standings

Pos	Driver	Points
1	Ben Rhodes	265
2	Chandler Smith	227 (–38)
3	Stewart Friesen	214 (–51)
4	Zane Smith	211 (–54)
5	John Hunter Nemechek	203 (–62)
6	Christian Eckes	193 (–72)
7	Ty Majeski	187 (–78)
8	Tanner Gray	180 (–85)
9	Carson Hocevar	170 (–95)
10	Matt Crafton	163 (–102)
Official driver's standings

- Note: Only the first 10 positions are included for the driver standings.

Previous race: 2022 Blue-Emu Maximum Pain Relief 200	NASCAR Camping World Truck Series; 2022 season	Next race: 2022 Dead On Tools 200
