= 2020 E.P.T. 200 =

2020 E. P. T. 200
Race details
- Race 10 of 23 of the 2020 NASCAR Gander RV & Outdoors Truck Series
- Date: July 25, 2020
- Official name: E. P. T. 200
- Location: Kansas City, Kansas, Kansas Speedway
- Course: Permanent racing facility
- Course length: 1.5 miles (2.41 km)
- Distance: 134 laps, 201 mi (323.477 km)
- Scheduled distance: 134 laps, 201 mi (323.477 km)
- Average speed: 102.016 miles per hour (164.179 km/h)

Pole position
Driver	Chase Purdy	GMS Racing
- Grid positions set by partial inversion of previous race's finishing order

Most laps led
Driver	Zane Smith	GMS Racing
- Laps: 50

Winner
No. 88	Matt Crafton	ThorSport Racing

Television in the United States
- Network: Fox Sports 1
- Announcers: Vince Welch, Michael Waltrip, and Regan Smith

Radio in the United States
- Radio: Motor Racing Network

The 2020 E. P. T. 200 was the 10th stock car race of the 2020 NASCAR Gander RV & Outdoors Truck Series season. The race was meant to be a temporary replacement for the formerly scheduled Camping World 225 that was scheduled to take place at Chicagoland Speedway due to the COVID-19 pandemic. The race was held on Saturday, July 25, 2020, in Kansas City, Kansas at Kansas Speedway, a 1.5 miles (2.4 km) permanent D-shaped oval racetrack. The race took the scheduled 134 laps to complete. At race's end, Matt Crafton would win the race after taking the lead on the final restart to win the 15th and final NASCAR Gander RV & Outdoors Truck Series win of his career.

== Background ==
The layout of Kansas Speedway, the venue where the race was held.

Kansas Speedway is a 1.5-mile (2.4 km) tri-oval race track in Kansas City, Kansas. It was built in 2001 and hosts two annual NASCAR race weekends. The IndyCar Series also raced there until 2011. The speedway is owned and operated by NASCAR.

=== Entry list ===
#	Driver	Team	Make
00	Ryan Huff	Reaume Brothers Racing	Toyota
2	Sheldon Creed	GMS Racing	Chevrolet
02	Tate Fogleman	Young's Motorsports	Chevrolet
3	Jordan Anderson	Jordan Anderson Racing	Chevrolet
4	Raphaël Lessard	Kyle Busch Motorsports	Toyota
04	Cory Roper	Roper Racing	Ford
6	Norm Benning	Norm Benning Racing	Chevrolet
7	Korbin Forrister*	All Out Motorsports	Toyota
9	Codie Rohrbaugh	CR7 Motorsports	Chevrolet
10	Jennifer Jo Cobb	Jennifer Jo Cobb Racing	Chevrolet
11	Spencer Davis	Spencer Davis Motorsports	Toyota
13	Johnny Sauter	ThorSport Racing	Ford
15	Tanner Gray	DGR-Crosley	Ford
16	Austin Hill	Hattori Racing Enterprises	Toyota
18	Christian Eckes	Kyle Busch Motorsports	Toyota
19	Derek Kraus	McAnally–Hilgemann Racing	Toyota
20	Spencer Boyd	Young's Motorsports	Chevrolet
21	Zane Smith	GMS Racing	Chevrolet
22	Austin Wayne Self	AM Racing	Chevrolet
23	Brett Moffitt	GMS Racing	Chevrolet
24	Chase Purdy	GMS Racing	Chevrolet
26	Tyler Ankrum	GMS Racing	Chevrolet
28	Bryan Dauzat	FDNY Racing	Chevrolet
30	Brennan Poole	On Point Motorsports	Toyota
33	Kevin Donahue	Reaume Brothers Racing	Toyota
38	Todd Gilliland	Front Row Motorsports	Ford
40	Travis Pastrana	Niece Motorsports	Chevrolet
44	Natalie Decker	Niece Motorsports	Chevrolet
45	Ty Majeski	Niece Motorsports	Chevrolet
49	Tim Viens**	CMI Motorsports	Chevrolet
51	Brandon Jones	Kyle Busch Motorsports	Toyota
52	Stewart Friesen	Halmar Friesen Racing	Toyota
56	Tyler Hill	Hill Motorsports	Chevrolet
68	Clay Greenfield	Clay Greenfield Motorsports	Toyota
83	Ray Ciccarelli**	CMI Motorsports	Chevrolet
88	Matt Crafton	ThorSport Racing	Ford
97	Robby Lyons	Diversified Motorsports Enterprises	Chevrolet
98	Grant Enfinger	ThorSport Racing	Ford
99	Ben Rhodes	ThorSport Racing	Ford
Official entry list

*Withdrew.

**Originally, Viens was slated to drive the #49, but the driver would change to Ray Ciccarelli for unknown reasons. As a result, the #83 would withdraw.

== Starting lineup ==
The starting lineup was set by partial inversion of the previous race, the 2020 Blue-Emu Maximum Pain Relief 200. Only the top 15 was inverted. As a result, Chase Purdy of GMS Racing won the pole.

Pos.	#	Driver	Team	Make
1	24	Chase Purdy	GMS Racing	Chevrolet
2	51	Brandon Jones	Kyle Busch Motorsports	Toyota
3	18	Christian Eckes	Kyle Busch Motorsports	Toyota
4	30	Brennan Poole	On Point Motorsports	Toyota
5	45	Ty Majeski	Niece Motorsports	Chevrolet
6	38	Todd Gilliland	Front Row Motorsports	Ford
7	13	Johnny Sauter	ThorSport Racing	Ford
8	2	Sheldon Creed	GMS Racing	Chevrolet
9	99	Ben Rhodes	ThorSport Racing	Ford
10	21	Zane Smith	GMS Racing	Chevrolet
11	19	Derek Kraus	McAnally–Hilgemann Racing	Toyota
12	88	Matt Crafton	ThorSport Racing	Ford
13	98	Grant Enfinger	ThorSport Racing	Ford
14	23	Brett Moffitt	GMS Racing	Chevrolet
15	16	Austin Hill	Hattori Racing Enterprises	Toyota
16	4	Raphaël Lessard	Kyle Busch Motorsports	Toyota
17	22	Austin Wayne Self	AM Racing	Chevrolet
18	15	Tanner Gray	DGR-Crosley	Ford
19	56	Tyler Hill	Hill Motorsports	Chevrolet
20	04	Cory Roper	Roper Racing	Ford
21	44	Natalie Decker	Niece Motorsports	Chevrolet
22	02	Tate Fogleman	Young's Motorsports	Chevrolet
23	20	Spencer Boyd	Young's Motorsports	Chevrolet
24	9	Codie Rohrbaugh	CR7 Motorsports	Chevrolet
25	00	Ryan Huff	Reaume Brothers Racing	Toyota
26	97	Robby Lyons	Diversified Motorsports Enterprises	Chevrolet
27	52	Stewart Friesen	Halmar Friesen Racing	Toyota
28	68	Clay Greenfield	Clay Greenfield Motorsports	Toyota
29	11	Spencer Davis	Spencer Davis Motorsports	Toyota
30	3	Jordan Anderson	Jordan Anderson Racing	Chevrolet
31	10	Jennifer Jo Cobb	Jennifer Jo Cobb Racing	Chevrolet
32	49	Ray Ciccarelli	CMI Motorsports	Chevrolet
33	26	Tyler Ankrum	GMS Racing	Chevrolet
34	40	Travis Pastrana	Niece Motorsports	Chevrolet
35	6	Norm Benning	Norm Benning Racing	Chevrolet
36	28	Bryan Dauzat	FDNY Racing	Chevrolet
37	33	Kevin Donahue	Reaume Brothers Racing	Toyota
Withdrew
WD	7	Korbin Forrister	All Out Motorsports	Toyota
WD	83	Ray Ciccarelli	CMI Motorsports	Chevrolet
Official starting lineup

== Race results ==
Stage 1 Laps: 30

Fin	#	Driver	Team	Make	Pts
1	21	Zane Smith	GMS Racing	Chevrolet	10
2	23	Brett Moffitt	GMS Racing	Chevrolet	9
3	88	Matt Crafton	ThorSport Racing	Ford	8
4	18	Christian Eckes	Kyle Busch Motorsports	Toyota	7
5	51	Brandon Jones	Kyle Busch Motorsports	Toyota	0
6	30	Brennan Poole	On Point Motorsports	Toyota	0
7	24	Chase Purdy	GMS Racing	Chevrolet	4
8	38	Todd Gilliland	Front Row Motorsports	Ford	3
9	4	Raphaël Lessard	Kyle Busch Motorsports	Toyota	2
10	19	Derek Kraus	McAnally–Hilgemann Racing	Toyota	1

Stage 2 Laps: 30

Fin	#	Driver	Team	Make	Pts
1	21	Zane Smith	GMS Racing	Chevrolet	10
2	88	Matt Crafton	ThorSport Racing	Ford	9
3	23	Brett Moffitt	GMS Racing	Chevrolet	8
4	2	Sheldon Creed	GMS Racing	Chevrolet	7
5	19	Derek Kraus	McAnally–Hilgemann Racing	Toyota	6
6	26	Tyler Ankrum	GMS Racing	Chevrolet	5
7	16	Austin Hill	Hattori Racing Enterprises	Toyota	4
8	24	Chase Purdy	GMS Racing	Chevrolet	3
9	18	Christian Eckes	Kyle Busch Motorsports	Toyota	2
10	38	Todd Gilliland	Front Row Motorsports	Ford	1

Stage 3 Laps: 74

Fin	St	#	Driver	Team	Make	Laps	Led	Status	Pts
1	12	88	Matt Crafton	ThorSport Racing	Ford	134	23	running	57
2	3	18	Christian Eckes	Kyle Busch Motorsports	Toyota	134	6	running	44
3	13	98	Grant Enfinger	ThorSport Racing	Ford	134	0	running	34
4	18	15	Tanner Gray	DGR-Crosley	Ford	134	3	running	33
5	9	99	Ben Rhodes	ThorSport Racing	Ford	134	1	running	32
6	15	16	Austin Hill	Hattori Racing Enterprises	Toyota	134	19	running	35
7	11	19	Derek Kraus	McAnally–Hilgemann Racing	Toyota	134	0	running	37
8	2	51	Brandon Jones	Kyle Busch Motorsports	Toyota	134	0	running	0
9	10	21	Zane Smith	GMS Racing	Chevrolet	134	50	running	48
10	1	24	Chase Purdy	GMS Racing	Chevrolet	134	0	running	34
11	16	4	Raphaël Lessard	Kyle Busch Motorsports	Toyota	134	0	running	28
12	4	30	Brennan Poole	On Point Motorsports	Toyota	134	0	running	0
13	17	22	Austin Wayne Self	AM Racing	Chevrolet	134	0	running	24
14	29	11	Spencer Davis	Spencer Davis Motorsports	Toyota	134	0	running	23
15	30	3	Jordan Anderson	Jordan Anderson Racing	Chevrolet	134	0	running	22
16	19	56	Tyler Hill	Hill Motorsports	Chevrolet	134	0	running	21
17	22	02	Tate Fogleman	Young's Motorsports	Chevrolet	134	0	running	20
18	23	20	Spencer Boyd	Young's Motorsports	Chevrolet	134	0	running	19
19	25	00	Ryan Huff	Reaume Brothers Racing	Toyota	133	0	running	0
20	6	38	Todd Gilliland	Front Row Motorsports	Ford	133	0	running	21
21	26	97	Robby Lyons	Diversified Motorsports Enterprises	Chevrolet	133	0	running	0
22	34	40	Travis Pastrana	Niece Motorsports	Chevrolet	132	0	running	0
23	37	33	Kevin Donahue	Reaume Brothers Racing	Toyota	130	0	running	14
24	32	49	Ray Ciccarelli	CMI Motorsports	Chevrolet	130	0	running	13
25	35	6	Norm Benning	Norm Benning Racing	Chevrolet	129	0	running	12
26	8	2	Sheldon Creed	GMS Racing	Chevrolet	118	18	dvp	18
27	14	23	Brett Moffitt	GMS Racing	Chevrolet	94	11	crash	27
28	33	26	Tyler Ankrum	GMS Racing	Chevrolet	92	0	crash	14
29	24	9	Codie Rohrbaugh	CR7 Motorsports	Chevrolet	91	0	dvp	8
30	5	45	Ty Majeski	Niece Motorsports	Chevrolet	90	0	dvp	7
31	28	68	Clay Greenfield	Clay Greenfield Motorsports	Toyota	90	0	dvp	6
32	31	10	Jennifer Jo Cobb	Jennifer Jo Cobb Racing	Chevrolet	87	0	dvp	5
33	7	13	Johnny Sauter	ThorSport Racing	Ford	83	0	crash	5
34	27	52	Stewart Friesen	Halmar Friesen Racing	Toyota	82	3	crash	5
35	21	44	Natalie Decker	Niece Motorsports	Chevrolet	82	0	crash	5
36	20	04	Cory Roper	Roper Racing	Ford	77	0	crash	5
37	36	28	Bryan Dauzat	FDNY Racing	Chevrolet	61	0	electrical	5
Official race results

Previous race: 2020 Blue-Emu Maximum Pain Relief 200	NASCAR Gander RV & Outdoors Truck Series; 2020 season	Next race: 2020 Henry Ford Health System 200
