= Ray Ciccarelli =

American racing driver (born 1970)

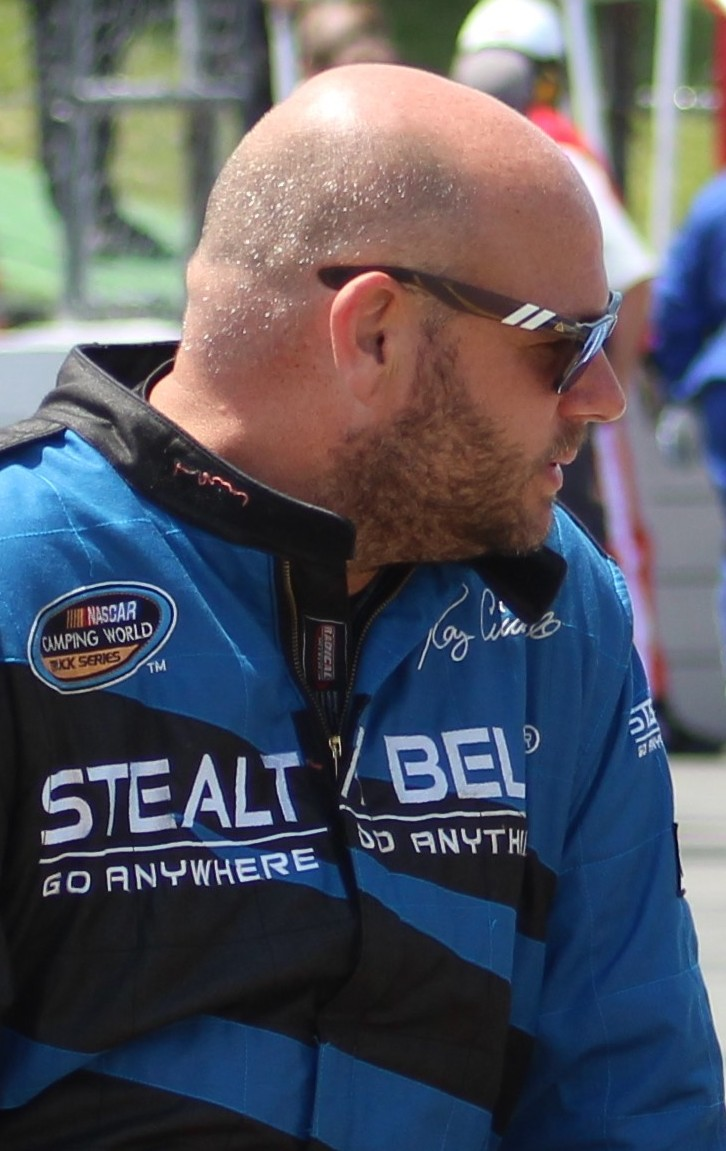
- Ciccarelli at Pocono Raceway in 2018
- Born: Raymond J. Ciccarelli; January 20, 1970 (age 56); Ellicott City, Maryland, U.S.

NASCAR FedEx Freight Truck Series career
- 33 races run over 5 years
- 2021 position: 67th
- Best finish: 33rd (2019)
- First race: 2017 Eldora Dirt Derby (Eldora)
- Last race: 2021 UNOH 200 (Bristol)
Wins	Top tens	Poles
0	1	0
- Statistics up to date as of December 30, 2021.

Raymond J. Ciccarelli (born January 20, 1970) is an American professional stock car racing driver. He last competed part-time in the NASCAR Camping World Truck Series, driving the No. 49 Chevrolet Silverado for his own team, CMI Motorsports. He has also competed in what are now the ARCA Menards Series and ARCA Menards Series East in the past.

== Racing career ==
=== ARCA Racing Series ===
Ciccarelli drove part-time in the series in 2014, 2015, and 2016 for teams Carter 2 Motorsports, Kimmel Racing, Hamilton-Hughes Racing, and Hixson Motorsports. He started his own team, Ciccarelli Racing, for 2017. The team's first race came in the season-opener at Daytona where Ciccarelli finished 21st in his No. 38 Ford after a solid seventh-place qualifying run. The team returned at Talladega, although they used owner points from the full-time Hixson Motorsports No. 3 car to have a better shot of qualifying for the race (which they successfully did). Using that number instead of the No. 38 (which had only run Daytona), they picked up a thirteenth-place finish in the race. Ciccarelli had driven for the Hixson team in a few races in 2016.

=== Truck Series ===
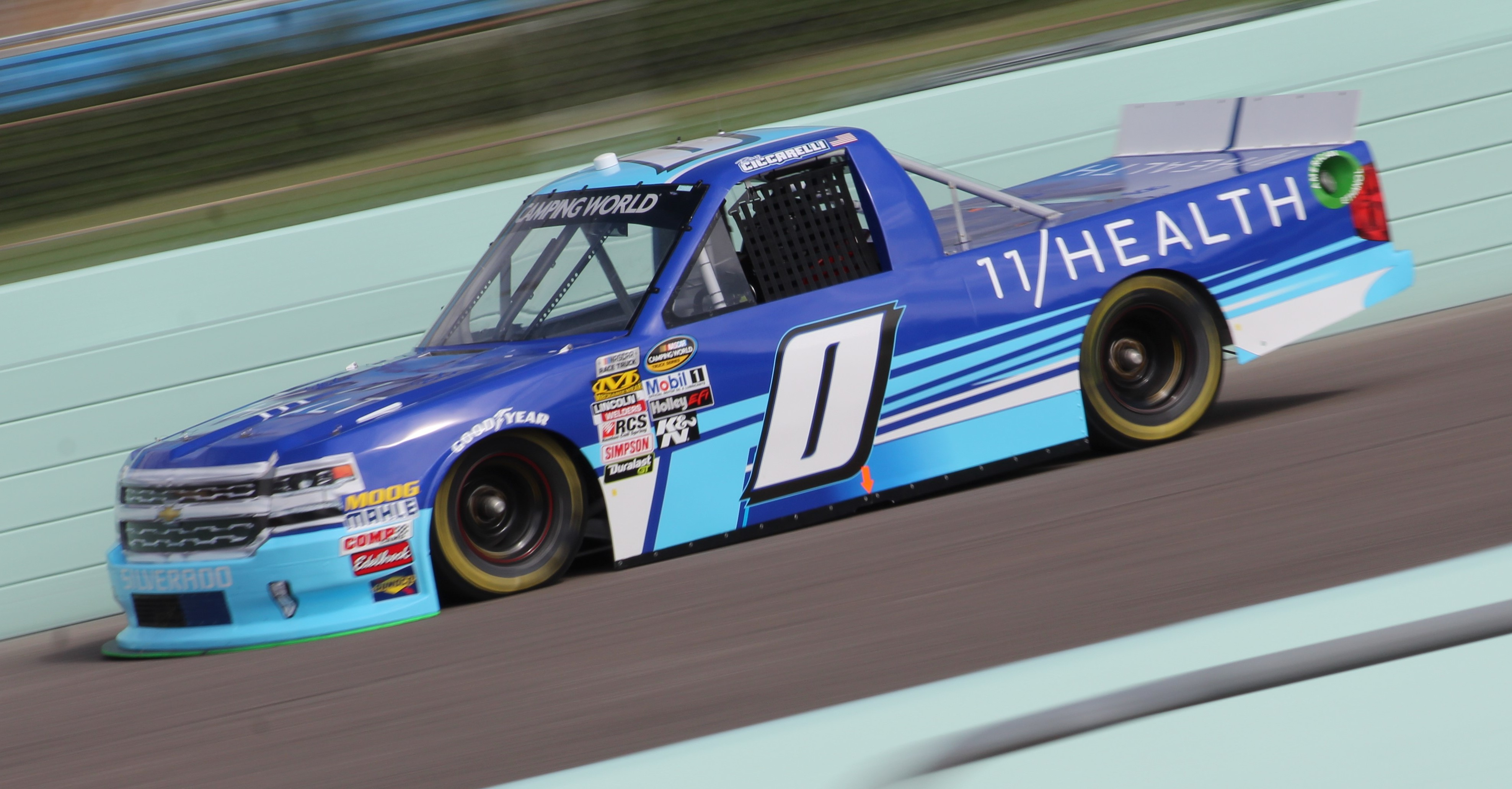
Ciccarelli in the No. 0 for Jennifer Jo Cobb at Homestead in 2018.

In 2017, Ciccarelli made his Truck Series debut in the Eldora Dirt Derby, driving the No. 10 truck for Jennifer Jo Cobb Racing. He started 32nd and finished 22nd. After that, he start-and-parked the No. 0 truck for the same team in 4 races at Michigan, New Hampshire, Texas, and Phoenix. He finished 26th, 29th, 28th, and 26th respectively. He returned to the No. 10 truck at Homestead. He qualified 31st, but an engine malfunction before the green flag waved gave him a 32nd-place finish.

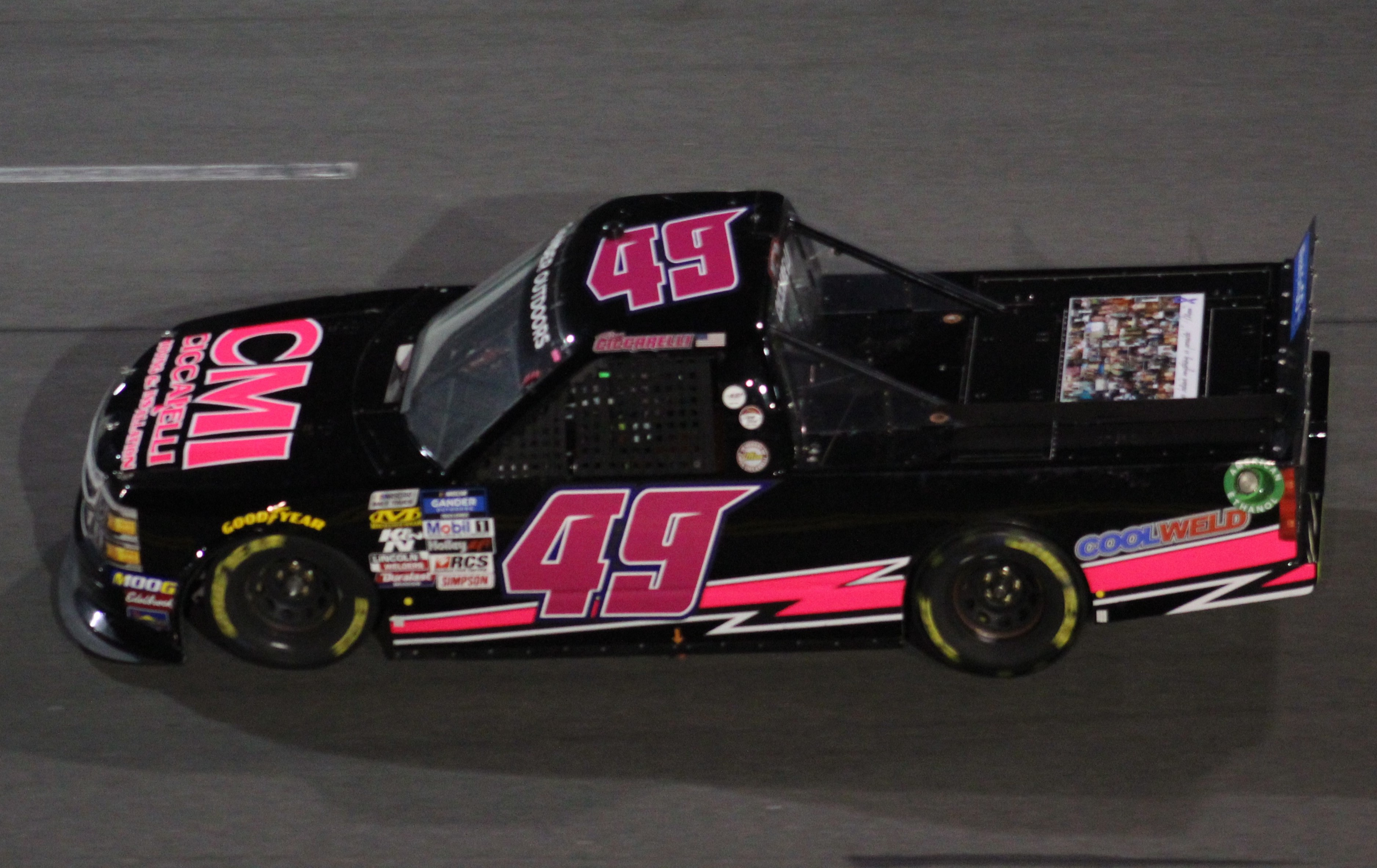
Ciccarelli's No. 49 for his own team at Daytona in 2019.

In 2019, Ciccarelli acquired trucks, equipment, and owner points from the closed Premium Motorsports No. 49 truck and restarted his own team, now under the name CMI Motorsports, which stood for "Ciccarelli Moving & Installation", a company owned by Ciccarelli and which is one of the team's sponsors. After running the first two races of the season, Ciccarelli and the CMI Motorsports team skipped the third round at Las Vegas with a planned comeback for the fourth round at Martinsville. Later in the year, he would score a career-best 9th-place finish at Michigan.

=== Planned departure from NASCAR announcement ===
Ciccarelli announced in June 2020 his retirement from NASCAR as a driver and a team owner at the end of the 2020 season. His announcement, which came in the form of a post on his Facebook page on June 10, was made on the same day as NASCAR's decision to ban the display of the Confederate battle flag from their events, a decision they made in the midst of the George Floyd protests due to the flag's longtime association with white supremacist groups. While many NASCAR drivers praised the ban, Ciccarelli decried it, as he believed that it and other recent decisions by the sanctioning body ventured into the realm of politics.

However, Ciccarelli's team, CMI Motorsports, posted on their Twitter account on October 30 that "We're not done yet. See you all in 2021", signaling he would not close down his team after the 2020 season as planned. On November 19, when it was revealed on TobyChristie.com that Tim Viens was to continue as a driver for CMI, Ciccarelli told the website that he planned on driving in three to four races in 2021.

== Motorsports career results ==
=== NASCAR ===
(key) (Bold – Pole position awarded by qualifying time. Italics – Pole position earned by points standings or practice time. * – Most laps led.)

==== Camping World Truck Series ====
NASCAR Camping World Truck Series results
Year	Team	No.	Make	1	2	3	4	5	6	7	8	9	10	11	12	13	14	15	16	17	18	19	20	21	22	23	NCWTC	Pts	Ref
2017	Jennifer Jo Cobb Racing	10	Chevy	DAY	ATL	MAR	KAN	CLT	DOV	TEX	GTW	IOW	KEN	ELD; 22	POC											HOM; 32	38th	59	
2017	Jennifer Jo Cobb Racing	0	Chevy													MCH; 26	BRI	MSP	CHI	NHA; 29	LVS	TAL	MAR	TEX; 28	PHO; 26		38th	59	
2018	TJL Motorsports	1	Chevy	DAY	ATL	LVS	MAR	DOV; Wth	KAN	CLT	TEX	IOW	GTW	CHI	KEN												61st	31	
2018	Jennifer Jo Cobb Racing	0	Chevy													ELD; DNQ						TAL; DNQ	MAR; DNQ	TEX	PHO	HOM; 25	61st	31	
2018	Beaver Motorsports	50	Chevy														POC; 27	MCH	BRI	MSP; 28	LVS						61st	31	
2019	CMI Motorsports	49	Chevy	DAY; 28	ATL; 26	LVS	MAR; DNQ	TEX; 16	DOV; 24	KAN	CLT	TEX	IOW	GTW	CHI	KEN; DNQ	POC; 19	ELD	MCH; 9	BRI				MAR; 21	PHO	HOM; 31	33rd	130	
2019	Jennifer Jo Cobb Racing	0	Chevy																		MSP; 29	LVS	TAL				33rd	130	
2020	CMI Motorsports	49	Chevy	DAY; DNQ	LVS	CLT	ATL	HOM; 29	POC; 27			KAN; 32	KAN; 24						RCH; 31	BRI	LVS; 26	TAL; 27					40th	111	
2020	CMI Motorsports	83	Chevy							KEN; 32	TEX			MCH; 34	DAY	DOV	GTW	DAR					KAN; 26	TEX; 22	MAR; 25	PHO	40th	111	
2021	CMI Motorsports	49	Chevy	DAY; DNQ	DAY	LVS	ATL; DNQ	BRI	RCH	KAN	DAR; DNQ	COA	CLT														67th	20	
2021	CMI Motorsports	49	Toyota											TEX; 32	NSH	POC; 23	KNX	GLN	GTW	DAR							67th	20	
2021	CMI Motorsports	49	Ford																		BRI; 39	LVS	TAL	MAR	PHO		67th	20	

==== Busch East Series ====
NASCAR Busch East Series results
Year	Team	No.	Make	1	2	3	4	5	6	7	8	9	10	11	NBESC	Pts	Ref
2006	Glidden Motorsports	83	Ford	GRE	STA	HOL	TMP	ERI	NHA	ADI; 16	WFD; 15	NHA; 31	DOV; DNQ	LRP	35th	331	

=== ARCA Racing Series ===
ARCA Racing Series results
Year	Team	No.	Make	1	2	3	4	5	6	7	8	9	10	11	12	13	14	15	16	17	18	19	20	ARSC	Pts	Ref
2014	Carter 2 Motorsports	97	Dodge	DAY	MOB	SLM	TAL	TOL	NJE	POC	MCH	ELK	WIN	CHI	IRP; 19	POC								44th	390	
2014	Carter 2 Motorsports	40	Dodge														BLN; 19	ISF; 22	MAD	DSF	SLM	KEN	KAN	44th	390	
2015	Kimmel Racing	68	Ford	DAY	MOB	NSH	SLM	TAL	TOL	NJE	POC; 32	MCH	CHI	WIN	IOW	IRP								90th	200	
2015	Carter 2 Motorsports	97	Dodge														POC; 20	BLN	ISF	DSF	SLM	KEN	KAN	90th	200	
2016	Hamilton-Hughes Racing	63	Dodge	DAY; DNQ	NSH; 33	SLM	TAL	TOL	NJE															74th	300	
2016	Hixson Motorsports	2	Chevy							POC; 26	MCH	MAD	WIN	IOW	IRP; 24	POC	BLN	ISF	DSF	SLM	CHI	KEN	KAN	74th	300	
2017	Ciccarelli Racing	38	Ford	DAY; 21	NSH	SLM																		66th	290	
2017	Ciccarelli Racing	3	Ford				TAL; 13	TOL	ELK	POC	MCH	MAD	IOW	IRP	POC	WIN	ISF	ROA	DSF	SLM	CHI	KEN	KAN	66th	290	
