= 2020 Clean Harbors 200 =

Race details
- Race 20 of 23 of the 2020 NASCAR Gander RV & Outdoors Truck Series
- Date: October 17, 2020
- Official name: Clean Harbors 200
- Location: Kansas City, Kansas, Kansas Speedway
- Course: Permanent racing facility
- Course length: 1.5 miles (2.41 km)
- Distance: 139 laps, 208.5 mi (335.547 km)
- Scheduled distance: 134 laps, 201 mi (323.477 km)
- Average speed: 119.942 miles per hour (193.028 km/h)

Pole position
Driver	Chandler Smith	Kyle Busch Motorsports
- Grid positions set by competition-based formula

Most laps led
Driver	Sheldon Creed	GMS Racing
- Laps: 61

Winner
No. 23	Brett Moffitt	GMS Racing

Television in the United States
- Network: FOX
- Announcers: Vince Welch, Michael Waltrip, Kurt Busch

Radio in the United States
- Radio: Motor Racing Network

The 2020 Clean Harbors 200 was the 20th stock car race of the 2020 NASCAR Gander RV & Outdoors Truck Series season and the first race of the Round of 8. The race was originally going to be held at Eldora Speedway for the Eldora Dirt Derby, but due to the COVID-19 pandemic, NASCAR was forced to move the race to Kansas City, Kansas and give Kansas Speedway, a 1.5 miles (2.4 km) permanent D-shaped oval racetrack, a temporary third date. The race was held on Saturday, October 17, 2020. The race was extended from the scheduled 134 laps to 139 laps due to a NASCAR overtime finish. After a final restart that was caused by Zane Smith wrecked while trying to pass the leader Brett Moffitt, Brett Moffitt with 2 to go would pull away from the field and win his 12th career NASCAR Gander RV & Outdoors Truck Series win, and the first and only win of the season. To fill out the podium, Sheldon Creed of GMS Racing and Austin Hill of Hattori Racing Enterprises finished second and third, respectively.

The race was the NASCAR Gander RV & Outdoors Truck Series debut for ARCA Menards Series driver Hailie Deegan. She would finish 16th, the best result for a debut by a woman.

== Background ==
The layout of Kansas Speedway, the venue where the race was held.

Kansas Speedway is a 1.5-mile (2.4 km) tri-oval race track in Kansas City, Kansas. It was built in 2001 and hosts two annual NASCAR race weekends. The speedway is owned and operated by NASCAR.

=== Entry list ===
#	Driver	Team	Make
00	Josh Reaume	Reaume Brothers Racing	Toyota
2	Sheldon Creed	GMS Racing	Chevrolet
02	Tate Fogleman	Young's Motorsports	Chevrolet
3	Jordan Anderson	Jordan Anderson Racing	Chevrolet
4	Raphaël Lessard	Kyle Busch Motorsports	Toyota
6	Norm Benning	Norm Benning Racing	Chevrolet
10	Jennifer Jo Cobb	Jennifer Jo Cobb Racing	Chevrolet
13	Johnny Sauter	ThorSport Racing	Ford
15	Tanner Gray	DGR-Crosley	Ford
16	Austin Hill	Hattori Racing Enterprises	Toyota
17	Hailie Deegan	DGR-Crosley	Ford
18	Christian Eckes	Kyle Busch Motorsports	Toyota
19	Derek Kraus	McAnally–Hilgemann Racing	Toyota
20	Spencer Boyd	Young's Motorsports	Chevrolet
21	Zane Smith	GMS Racing	Chevrolet
22	Austin Wayne Self	AM Racing	Chevrolet
23	Brett Moffitt	GMS Racing	Chevrolet
24	David Gravel	GMS Racing	Chevrolet
26	Tyler Ankrum	GMS Racing	Chevrolet
30	Danny Bohn	On Point Motorsports	Toyota
33	Josh Bilicki	Reaume Brothers Racing	Toyota
38	Todd Gilliland	Front Row Motorsports	Ford
40	Ryan Truex	Niece Motorsports	Chevrolet
41	Dawson Cram	Cram Racing Enterprises	Chevrolet
44	Colin Garrett	Niece Motorsports	Chevrolet
45	Trevor Bayne	Niece Motorsports	Chevrolet
49	Tim Viens	CMI Motorsports	Chevrolet
51	Chandler Smith	Kyle Busch Motorsports	Toyota
52	Timothy Peters	Halmar Friesen Racing	Toyota
56	Tyler Hill	Hill Motorsports	Chevrolet
68	Clay Greenfield	Clay Greenfield Motorsports	Toyota
75	Parker Kligerman	Henderson Motorsports	Chevrolet
83	Ray Ciccarelli	CMI Motorsports	Chevrolet
88	Matt Crafton	ThorSport Racing	Ford
98	Grant Enfinger	ThorSport Racing	Ford
99	Ben Rhodes	ThorSport Racing	Ford
Official entry list

== Starting lineup ==
The starting lineup was determined by a metric qualifying system based on the results and fastest lap of the last race, the 2020 Chevrolet Silverado 250 and owner's points. As a result, Chandler Smith of Kyle Busch Motorsports won the pole.

Pos.	#	Driver	Team	Make
1	51	Chandler Smith	Kyle Busch Motorsports	Toyota
2	99	Ben Rhodes	ThorSport Racing	Ford
3	23	Brett Moffitt	GMS Racing	Chevrolet
4	2	Sheldon Creed	GMS Racing	Chevrolet
5	88	Matt Crafton	ThorSport Racing	Ford
6	98	Grant Enfinger	ThorSport Racing	Ford
7	26	Tyler Ankrum	GMS Racing	Chevrolet
8	16	Austin Hill	Hattori Racing Enterprises	Toyota
9	21	Zane Smith	GMS Racing	Chevrolet
10	4	Raphaël Lessard	Kyle Busch Motorsports	Toyota
11	45	Trevor Bayne	Niece Motorsports	Chevrolet
12	19	Derek Kraus	McAnally–Hilgemann Racing	Toyota
13	13	Johnny Sauter	ThorSport Racing	Ford
14	18	Christian Eckes	Kyle Busch Motorsports	Toyota
15	3	Jordan Anderson	Jordan Anderson Racing	Chevrolet
16	68	Clay Greenfield	Clay Greenfield Motorsports	Toyota
17	38	Todd Gilliland	Front Row Motorsports	Ford
18	22	Austin Wayne Self	AM Racing	Chevrolet
19	15	Tanner Gray	DGR-Crosley	Ford
20	44	Colin Garrett	Niece Motorsports	Chevrolet
21	40	Ryan Truex	Niece Motorsports	Chevrolet
22	56	Tyler Hill	Hill Motorsports	Chevrolet
23	02	Tate Fogleman	Young's Motorsports	Chevrolet
24	30	Danny Bohn	On Point Motorsports	Toyota
25	24	David Gravel	GMS Racing	Chevrolet
26	6	Norm Benning	Norm Benning Racing	Chevrolet
27	10	Jennifer Jo Cobb	Jennifer Jo Cobb Racing	Chevrolet
28	52	Timothy Peters	Halmar Friesen Racing	Toyota
29	00	Josh Reaume	Reaume Brothers Racing	Toyota
30	33	Josh Bilicki	Reaume Brothers Racing	Toyota
31	20	Spencer Boyd	Young's Motorsports	Chevrolet
32	49	Tim Viens	CMI Motorsports	Chevrolet
33	41	Dawson Cram	Cram Racing Enterprises	Chevrolet
34	17	Hailie Deegan	DGR-Crosley	Ford
35	75	Parker Kligerman	Henderson Motorsports	Chevrolet
36	83	Ray Ciccarelli	CMI Motorsports	Chevrolet
Official starting lineup

== Race results ==
Stage 1 Laps: 30

Fin	#	Driver	Team	Make	Pts
1	2	Sheldon Creed	GMS Racing	Chevrolet	10
2	51	Chandler Smith	Kyle Busch Motorsports	Toyota	9
3	16	Austin Hill	Hattori Racing Enterprises	Toyota	8
4	21	Zane Smith	GMS Racing	Chevrolet	7
5	88	Matt Crafton	ThorSport Racing	Ford	6
6	18	Christian Eckes	Kyle Busch Motorsports	Toyota	5
7	98	Grant Enfinger	ThorSport Racing	Ford	4
8	13	Johnny Sauter	ThorSport Racing	Ford	3
9	23	Brett Moffitt	GMS Racing	Chevrolet	2
10	38	Todd Gilliland	Front Row Motorsports	Ford	1

Stage 2 Laps: 30

Fin	#	Driver	Team	Make	Pts
1	2	Sheldon Creed	GMS Racing	Chevrolet	10
2	21	Zane Smith	GMS Racing	Chevrolet	9
3	51	Chandler Smith	Kyle Busch Motorsports	Toyota	8
4	18	Christian Eckes	Kyle Busch Motorsports	Toyota	7
5	16	Austin Hill	Hattori Racing Enterprises	Toyota	6
6	88	Matt Crafton	ThorSport Racing	Ford	5
7	38	Todd Gilliland	Front Row Motorsports	Ford	4
8	13	Johnny Sauter	ThorSport Racing	Ford	3
9	23	Brett Moffitt	GMS Racing	Chevrolet	2
10	98	Grant Enfinger	ThorSport Racing	Ford	1

Stage 3 Laps: 79

Fin	St	#	Driver	Team	Make	Laps	Led	Status	Pts
1	3	23	Brett Moffitt	GMS Racing	Chevrolet	139	15	running	44
2	4	2	Sheldon Creed	GMS Racing	Chevrolet	139	61	running	55
3	8	16	Austin Hill	Hattori Racing Enterprises	Toyota	139	13	running	48
4	6	98	Grant Enfinger	ThorSport Racing	Ford	139	1	running	38
5	1	51	Chandler Smith	Kyle Busch Motorsports	Toyota	139	1	running	49
6	14	18	Christian Eckes	Kyle Busch Motorsports	Toyota	139	7	running	43
7	28	52	Timothy Peters	Halmar Friesen Racing	Toyota	139	0	running	30
8	5	88	Matt Crafton	ThorSport Racing	Ford	139	0	running	40
9	12	19	Derek Kraus	McAnally–Hilgemann Racing	Toyota	139	0	running	28
10	11	45	Trevor Bayne	Niece Motorsports	Chevrolet	139	0	running	27
11	9	21	Zane Smith	GMS Racing	Chevrolet	139	37	running	42
12	21	40	Ryan Truex	Niece Motorsports	Chevrolet	138	0	running	25
13	17	38	Todd Gilliland	Front Row Motorsports	Ford	138	3	running	29
14	22	56	Tyler Hill	Hill Motorsports	Chevrolet	138	0	running	23
15	35	75	Parker Kligerman	Henderson Motorsports	Chevrolet	138	0	running	22
16	34	17	Hailie Deegan	DGR-Crosley	Ford	138	0	running	0
17	23	02	Tate Fogleman	Young's Motorsports	Chevrolet	138	0	running	20
18	13	13	Johnny Sauter	ThorSport Racing	Ford	138	1	running	25
19	18	22	Austin Wayne Self	AM Racing	Chevrolet	137	0	running	18
20	2	99	Ben Rhodes	ThorSport Racing	Ford	136	0	running	17
21	24	30	Danny Bohn	On Point Motorsports	Toyota	136	0	running	16
22	31	20	Spencer Boyd	Young's Motorsports	Chevrolet	135	0	running	15
23	33	41	Dawson Cram	Cram Racing Enterprises	Chevrolet	135	0	running	14
24	20	44	Colin Garrett	Niece Motorsports	Chevrolet	135	0	running	0
25	16	68	Clay Greenfield	Clay Greenfield Motorsports	Toyota	134	0	running	12
26	36	83	Ray Ciccarelli	CMI Motorsports	Chevrolet	133	0	running	11
27	29	00	Josh Reaume	Reaume Brothers Racing	Toyota	133	0	running	10
28	30	33	Josh Bilicki	Reaume Brothers Racing	Toyota	132	0	running	0
29	27	10	Jennifer Jo Cobb	Jennifer Jo Cobb Racing	Chevrolet	130	0	running	8
30	15	3	Jordan Anderson	Jordan Anderson Racing	Chevrolet	127	0	running	7
31	26	6	Norm Benning	Norm Benning Racing	Chevrolet	108	0	vibration	6
32	32	49	Tim Viens	CMI Motorsports	Chevrolet	91	0	fuel pump	5
33	10	4	Raphaël Lessard	Kyle Busch Motorsports	Toyota	39	0	crash	5
34	7	26	Tyler Ankrum	GMS Racing	Chevrolet	38	0	crash	5
35	25	24	David Gravel	GMS Racing	Chevrolet	37	0	crash	5
36	19	15	Tanner Gray	DGR-Crosley	Ford	37	0	crash	5
Official race results

Previous race: 2020 Chevrolet Silverado 250	NASCAR Gander RV & Outdoors Truck Series; 2020 season	Next race: 2020 SpeedyCash.com 400
