= CMI Motorsports =

NASCAR team

- Owner: Ray Ciccarelli
- Series: NASCAR Camping World Truck Series
- Race drivers: 49. Andrew Gordon (part-time)
- Manufacturer: Ford
- Opened: 2017 (ARCA); 2019 (Trucks)
- Closed: 2017 (ARCA); 2022 (Trucks)

Career
- Debut: 2019 NextEra Energy 250 (Daytona)
- Latest race: 2022 Pinty's Truck Race on Dirt (Bristol)
- Races competed: 41
- Drivers' Championships: 0
- Race victories: 0
- Pole positions: 0

CMI Motorsports (formerly Ciccarelli Racing) is an American professional dirt track racing team that competes in the World of Outlaws Late Model Series, fielding the No. 49 Rocket XR1 part-time for Ray Ciccarelli. The team also previously fielded teams in the NASCAR Craftsman Truck Series and ARCA Menards Series.

Although Ciccarelli announced on June 10, 2020, that he would be closing down the team and selling off all its equipment after the conclusion of the 2020 Truck Series season. His decision to shut down his race team came in response to NASCAR's announcement on the same day that they would be banning the display of the Confederate flag from all tracks. Ciccarelli believed that the sport was getting too political and unnecessarily taking sides in those matters. In a Twitter post, in October 2020 they said that they would return in 2021 in some capacity, and three weeks later CMI Motorsports would announce that Tim Viens would run the No. 83 truck full time. However, after 2022 the team shut down and sold their assets to G2G Racing on the NASCAR side however continued on as a Super Late Model team.

== History ==
=== ARCA Racing Series ===
==== Car No. 38 history ====
Ciccarelli ran the season-opener at Daytona in 2017 with his own team, the No. 38 Ford, under the name Ciccarelli Racing. It was not his first race in the series, as he previously drove part-time in the series in 2014, 2015, and 2016 for teams Carter 2 Motorsports, Kimmel Racing, Hamilton-Hughes Racing, and Hixson Motorsports. Ciccarelli returned with his team to Talladega, although he drove the No. 3 instead of the No. 38, using owner points from Hixson (a team he drove for in a few races the prior year) to have a better shot of qualifying for the race, which he successfully did. The No. 3 was running the full season while the No. 38 had only attempted Daytona. He started his team after buying a superspeedway Ford car from Lira Motorsports, an ARCA team which fielded multiple cars in 2016 but had downsized to one car due to financial problems for the 2017 season and therefore was selling off equipment.

=== NASCAR Camping World Truck Series ===
==== Truck No. 49 history ====
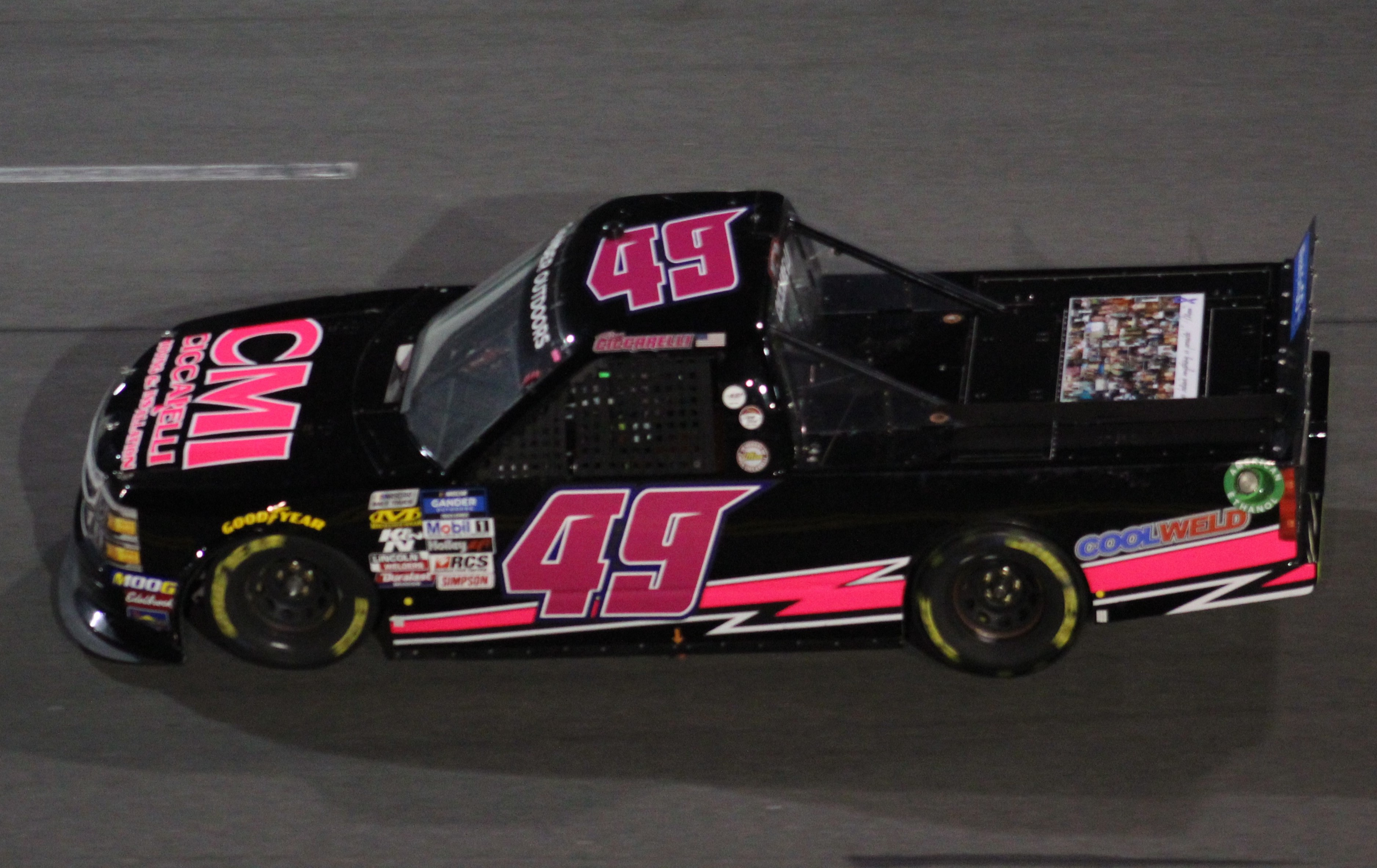
Ciccarelli's No. 49 for his own team at Daytona in 2019.

The team was restarted in 2019 when Ciccarelli, who previously drove in the Truck Series part-time for Jennifer Jo Cobb Racing, bought trucks and equipment from Premium Motorsports, which closed down their Truck Series team after the 2018 season. He kept the same number that Premium ran with, the No. 49, and the owner points that their No. 49 (driven mostly by Wendell Chavous) accumulated the prior year. The name of the team was CMI Motorsports, which stands for "Ciccarelli Moving & Installation", a company owned by Ciccarelli and which is one of the team's sponsors. The team made its debut at the season-opening 2019 NextEra Energy 250 at Daytona, where Ciccarelli successfully qualified for the race. However, he finished 28th after a crash ended his hopes of a good run. Ciccarelli attempted a part-time schedule for the rest of that season, totaling about half of the races. This included an upset ninth-place finish at Michigan. The team had two other surprisingly strong runs that year at Texas in March and Pocono, both top-20 finishes.

For 2020, the No. 49 started the year with Ciccarelli himself behind the wheel of truck, failing to qualify for the season-opener at Daytona with Ciccarelli, unlike the previous year. The team signed Bayley Currey on January 30, 2020, to drive for them at the following race at Las Vegas. In that announcement, CMI indicated that the No. 49 would be attempting the first five races to start the year. Currey ended up driving the next two races at Charlotte and Atlanta. He was supposed to have competed at Homestead but left the team in what was considered by many to be a one-screen departure after Ciccarelli made his remarks about the Confederate flag. Tim Viens later drove this truck at Kentucky, Texas, and Michigan. Roger Reuse made his Truck return in August 2020 for the Sunoco 159 at the Daytona International Speedway road course, driving this truck.

Despite announcing that they were going to shut down at the end of the season, CMI Motorsports and their flagship No. 49 truck returned for 2021 with owner Ray Ciccarelli driving at Daytona, failing to qualify. The No. 49 was entered again at the Daytona road course with Roger Reuse, but again failed to qualify due to the lack of qualifying being held. The team returned at Atlanta Motor Speedway with Ciccarelli again behind the wheel, but since the team hadn't qualified in the last two races, due to no qualifying being held, Ciccarelli automatically DNQ’d. Andrew Gordon would make his Truck Series debut at the Bristol Dirt race, finishing 31st. Ryan Reed would make his Truck Series return at Richmond, finishing 29th. John Atwell and J. J. Yeley would DNQ at COTA and Nashville respectively. Keith McGee would appear at Las Vegas.

In 2022, Gordon would make his return for G2G Racing's No. 46 truck (owned by Viens). Later, NASCAR notified G2G that the chassis for their No. 46 truck for the Bristol dirt race was registered to CMI (who G2G had purchased the truck from). As a result, Viens had to withdraw the No. 46 truck from the race. Viens then phone called Ciccarelli who agreed to file a late entry and field the No. 49 truck for Gordon for the race.

==== Truck No. 49 results ====
Year	Driver	No.	Make	1	2	3	4	5	6	7	8	9	10	11	12	13	14	15	16	17	18	19	20	21	22	23	NGTC	Pts	Ref
2019	Ray Ciccarelli	49	Chevy	DAY; 28	ATL; 26	LVS	MAR; DNQ	TEX; 16	DOV; 24	KAN		TEX	IOW	GTW	CHI	KEN; DNQ	POC; 19	ELD	MCH; 9	BRI	MSP	LVS	TAL	MAR; 21	PHO	HOM; 31	33rd	135	
2019	Stefan Parsons	49	Chevy								CLT; 24																33rd	135	
2020	Ray Ciccarelli	49	Chevy	DAY; DNQ				HOM; 29	POC; 27			KAN; 32	KAN; 24					DAR	RCH; 31	BRI	LVS; 26	TAL; 27			MAR	PHO	38th	136	
2020	Bayley Currey	49	Chevy		LVS; DNQ	CLT; 28	ATL; 32																				38th	136	
2020	Tim Viens	49	Chevy							KEN; 35	TEX; 26			MCH; 26									KAN; 32	TEX; 37			38th	136	
2020	Roger Reuse	49	Chevy												DRC; 38		GTW; 27										38th	136	
2020	Tyler Hill	49	Chevy													DOV; 30											38th	136	
2021	Ray Ciccarelli	49	Chevy	DAY; DNQ			ATL; DNQ				DAR; DNQ																41st	75	
2021	Ray Ciccarelli	49	Toyota											TEX; 32		POC; 23											41st	75	
2021	Ray Ciccarelli	49	Ford																		BRI; 39						41st	75	
2021	Roger Reuse	49	Chevy		DRC; DNQ	LVS																					41st	75	
2021	Roger Reuse	49	Ford															GLN; 30	GTW; 24	DAR				MAR; 35	PHO		41st	75	
2021	Andrew Gordon	49	Chevy					BRD; 31																			41st	75	
2021	Andrew Gordon	49	Ford														KNX; 24										41st	75	
2021	Ryan Reed	49	Chevy						RCH; 29																		41st	75	
2021	Ryan Reed	49	Toyota							KAN; 40																	41st	75	
2021	John Atwell	49	Ford									COA; DNQ	CLT														41st	75	
2021	J. J. Yeley	49	Toyota												NSH; DNQ												41st	75	
2021	Keith McGee	49	Toyota																			LVS; 32	TAL				41st	75	
2022	Andrew Gordon	49	Ford	DAY	LVS	ATL	COA	MAR	BRD; 32	DAR	KAN	TEX	CLT	GTW	SON	KNO	NSH	MOH	POC	IRP	RCH	KAN	BRI	TAL	HOM	PHO	-*	-*	

==== Truck No. 72 history ====
In 2021, CMI Motorsports debuted the No. 72 at Circuit of The Americas. Texas-native and Trans am TA 2 Series driver Samuel LeComte would drive this truck.

==== Truck No. 72 results ====
Year	Driver	No.	Make	1	2	3	4	5	6	7	8	9	10	11	12	13	14	15	16	17	18	19	20	21	22	NGTC	Pts	Ref
2021	Samuel LeComte	72	Chevy	DAY	DRC	LVS	ATL	BRD	RCH	KAN	DAR	COA; DNQ	CLT	TEX	NSH	POC	KNX	GLN; DNQ	GTW	DAR	BRI	LVS	TAL	MAR	PHO	NA	0^{1}	

==== Truck No. 83 history ====
CMI Motorsports debuted a second truck, the No. 83, at the second race of the 2020 season at Las Vegas with Stefan Parsons driving it. It was also entered in the next two races at Charlotte and Atlanta with T. J. Bell driving it. Tim Viens later drove this truck for a part-time Truck schedule beginning at Pocono. Owner Ray Ciccarelli drove the No. 83 part time as well, in Kentucky, Michigan, Kansas, Texas, and Martinsville.

The No. 83 returned in 2021 as a full-time team, with Tim Viens being tabbed to run the full schedule. Viens had a rough start to his first full-time season, failing to qualify for both Daytona races and skipping Las Vegas and Atlanta to focus on the upcoming Bristol Dirt Race, where Trevor Collins would drive but fail to qualify. Brad Gross, a Texan driver, was tabbed to run the Toyota Tundra 225, but he failed to qualify along with John Atwell and Samuel LeComte.

==== Truck No. 83 results ====
Year	Driver	No.	Make	1	2	3	4	5	6	7	8	9	10	11	12	13	14	15	16	17	18	19	20	21	22	23	NGTC	Pts	Ref
2020	Stefan Parsons	83	Chevy	DAY	LVS; 29																						41st	103	
2020	T. J. Bell	83	Chevy			CLT; 33	ATL; 38	HOM																			41st	103	
2020	Tim Viens	83	Chevy						POC; 29						DRC; 24	DOV; 31	GTW	DAR	RCH; 35	BRI	LVS; 33	TAL				PHO	41st	103	
2020	Ray Ciccarelli	83	Chevy							KEN; 32	TEX	KAN	KAN	MCH; 34									KAN; 26	TEX; 22	MAR; 25		41st	103	
2021	Tim Viens	83	Chevy	DAY; DNQ	DRC; DNQ	LVS	ATL																				NA	0^{1}	
2021	Trevor Collins	83	Chevy					BRD; DNQ	RCH	KAN	DAR																NA	0^{1}	
2021	Brad Gross	83	Chevy									COA; DNQ	CLT	TEX	NSH	POC	KNX	GLN	GTW	DAR	BRI	LVS	TAL	MAR	PHO		NA	0^{1}	
