= Jessica Friesen =

American racing driver (born 1986)

- Nationality: (United States) American
- Born: Jessica L. Zemken; June 5, 1986 (age 40) Gloversville, New York, U.S.
- Relatives: Stewart Friesen (husband)

World of Outlaws career
- Debut season: 2006
- Current team: Halmar Friesen Racing
- Former teams: Tony Stewart Racing
- Best finish: 26th in 2011

NASCAR FedEx Freight Truck Series career
- 2 races run over 2 years
- 2022 position: 80th
- Best finish: 78th (2021)
- First race: 2021 Corn Belt 150 (Knoxville)
- Last race: 2022 Clean Harbors 150 (Knoxville)
Wins	Top tens	Poles
0	0	0

All Star Circuit of Champions
- Years active: 2006, 2010–2013
- Teams: Tony Stewart Racing
- Starts: 41
- Best finish: 8th in 2011

Championship titles
- 2004: Utica-Rome Speedway DIRT Sportsman

Awards
- 2009: Outstanding Woman in Racing
- Statistics up to date as of November 5, 2022.

Jessica L. "Jess" Friesen (née Zemken, born May 6, 1986) is an American professional dirt track racing driver. She primarily competes in sprint car racing, and has raced in series like the All Star Circuit of Champions and World of Outlaws. She has also competed part-time in the NASCAR Craftsman Truck Series, driving the No. 62 for her family team, Halmar Friesen Racing. She is married to fellow dirt racer and NASCAR driver Stewart Friesen.

== Racing career ==
Zemken attended her first dirt race when she was two weeks old, and grew up supporting her father's dirt career. She started in kart racing after her father repaired karts and constructed a backyard track, which was followed by racing competitively. Zemken competed in karts for six years and won two local track championships before moving open-wheel cars. By the age of 14, she had won five track championships and over 100 feature races.

Zemken began competing full-time in the Sportsman class at Afton Speedway in 2001. She also competed in the DIRT Sportsman division at Utica-Rome Speedway, winning the track championship in 2004.

In 2009, Zemken was honored as an Outstanding Woman in Racing by the Northeast Dirt Modified Hall of Fame.

In 2010, Zemken joined Tony Stewart Racing to compete in a "true outlaw" sprint car schedule that included starts in the World of Outlaws and All Star Circuit of Champions.

In March 2021, Halmar Friesen Racing announced Friesen would make her NASCAR Camping World Truck Series debut in the Pinty's Dirt Truck Race at Bristol Motor Speedway. However, she did not make the event after the qualifying heat races were canceled due to rain. Serving as a teammate to her husband, the Friesens would have been the first spouses to compete in the same NASCAR race since Elton Sawyer and Patty Moise in the 1990s. After failing to qualify at Bristol, Friesen would enter Truck Series' other dirt race, the Corn Belt Weekend at Knoxville Raceway, in July, which she did qualify for. She ran the same two races in 2022. Her husband Stewart stated on SiriusXM NASCAR Radio on December that she would return to drive for HFR in the Bristol dirt race in 2023 and that Layne Riggs, who also drove the No. 62 truck part-time in 2022, would drive that truck at least part-time in 2023 with the possibility of a full season if additional sponsorship is found. If Riggs had been able to run full-time, Jessica would likely have driven a part-time third truck for HFR in the Bristol dirt race. It would have been the team's first time fielding a third truck.

== Personal life ==
Her father Ray Zemken competed in DIRT Modifieds, while her mother Shauna worked as an optometrist.

Zemken formerly dated team owner and NASCAR Cup Series champion Tony Stewart. In September 2014, she married fellow driver Stewart Friesen. Shortly after their marriage, the two raced together at Utica-Rome and finished first and second. The two have a son Parker and operate an apparel company One Zee Tee's.

== Motorsports career results ==
=== NASCAR ===
(key) (Bold – Pole position awarded by qualifying time. Italics – Pole position earned by points standings or practice time. * – Most laps led.)

==== Craftsman Truck Series ====
NASCAR Craftsman Truck Series results
Year	Team	No.	Make	1	2	3	4	5	6	7	8	9	10	11	12	13	14	15	16	17	18	19	20	21	22	23	NCTC	Pts	Ref
2021	Halmar Friesen Racing	62	Toyota	DAY	DAY	LVS	ATL	BRD; DNQ	RCH	KAN	DAR	COA	CLT	TEX	NSH	POC	KNX; 26	GLN	GTW	DAR	BRI	LVS	TAL	MAR	PHO		78th	11	
2022	Halmar Friesen Racing	62	Toyota	DAY	LVS	ATL	COA	MAR	BRD; DNQ	DAR	KAN	TEX	CLT	GTW	SON	KNX; 34	NSH	MOH	POC	IRP	RCH	KAN	BRI	TAL	HOM	PHO	80th	3	
2023	Halmar Friesen Racing	62	Toyota	DAY	LVS	ATL	COA	TEX	BRD; DNQ	MAR	KAN	DAR	NWS	CLT	GTW	NSH	MOH	POC	RCH	IRP	MLW	KAN	BRI	TAL	HOM	PHO	N/A	0	

^{*} Season still in progress
