= 2023 Weather Guard Truck Race on Dirt =

6th race of the 2023 NASCAR Craftsman Truck Series

Race details
- Race 6 of 23 of the 2023 NASCAR Craftsman Truck Series
- Date: April 8, 2023
- Location: Bristol Motor Speedway, Bristol, Tennessee
- Course: Permanent racing facility
- Course length: 0.533 miles (0.858 km)
- Distance: 150 laps, 79 mi (128 km)
- Scheduled distance: 150 laps, 79 mi (128 km)
- Average speed: 39.301 mph (63.249 km/h)

Pole position
Driver	Zane Smith	Front Row Motorsports
- Grid positions set by heat results

Most laps led
Driver	Joey Logano	ThorSport Racing
- Laps: 138

Winner
No. 66	Joey Logano	ThorSport Racing

Television in the United States
- Network: FS1
- Announcers: Adam Alexander, Phil Parsons, and Michael Waltrip

Radio in the United States
- Radio: MRN

The 2023 Weather Guard Truck Race on Dirt was the 6th stock car race of the 2023 NASCAR Craftsman Truck Series, and the 3rd iteration of the event. The race was held on Saturday, April 8, 2023, at a dirt version of Bristol Motor Speedway in Bristol, Tennessee, a 0.553 miles (0.890 km) permanent oval-shaped short track. The race took the scheduled 150 laps to complete. In a wreck-filled race that brought numerous cautions, Joey Logano, driving for ThorSport Racing, would put on a dominating performance, winning both stages, leading 138 of the 150 laps, and earning his second career NASCAR Craftsman Truck Series win, along with his first of the season. To fill out the podium, Ty Majeski, driving for ThorSport Racing, and William Byron, driving for Kyle Busch Motorsports, would finish 2nd and 3rd, respectively.

== Background ==
Bristol Motor Speedway, formerly known as Bristol International Raceway and Bristol Raceway, is a NASCAR short track venue located in Bristol, Tennessee. Constructed in 1960, it held its first NASCAR race on July 30, 1961. Despite its short length, Bristol is among the most popular tracks on the NASCAR schedule because of its distinct features, which include extraordinarily steep banking, an all concrete surface, two pit roads, and stadium-like seating.

In 2021, the race shifted to a dirt surface version of the track and was renamed the Pinty's Truck Race on Dirt. On January 25, 2021, NASCAR announced the stage lengths of all events in all three series. According to the stage lengths, it states the race will consist of 150 laps.

=== Entry list ===
- (R) denotes rookie driver.
- (i) denotes driver who is ineligible for series driver points.

#	Driver	Team	Make
02	Kris Wright	Young's Motorsports	Chevrolet
2	Nick Sanchez (R)	Rev Racing	Chevrolet
04	Kaden Honeycutt	Roper Racing	Ford
4	Chase Purdy	Kyle Busch Motorsports	Chevrolet
5	Dean Thompson	Tricon Garage	Toyota
6	Norm Benning	Norm Benning Racing	Chevrolet
7	Jonathan Davenport (i)	Spire Motorsports	Chevrolet
9	Colby Howard	CR7 Motorsports	Chevrolet
11	Corey Heim	Tricon Garage	Toyota
12	Spencer Boyd	Young's Motorsports	Chevrolet
13	Hailie Deegan	ThorSport Racing	Ford
15	Tanner Gray	Tricon Garage	Toyota
16	Tyler Ankrum	Hattori Racing Enterprises	Toyota
17	Taylor Gray (R)	Tricon Garage	Toyota
19	Christian Eckes	McAnally-Hilgemann Racing	Chevrolet
20	Stefan Parsons (i)	Young's Motorsports	Chevrolet
22	Chase Briscoe (i)	AM Racing	Ford
23	Grant Enfinger	GMS Racing	Chevrolet
24	Rajah Caruth (R)	GMS Racing	Chevrolet
25	Matt DiBenedetto	Rackley WAR	Chevrolet
30	Tanner Carrick	On Point Motorsports	Toyota
32	Bret Holmes (R)	Bret Holmes Racing	Chevrolet
33	Mason Massey	Reaume Brothers Racing	Ford
34	Josh Reaume	Reaume Brothers Racing	Ford
35	Jake Garcia (R)	McAnally-Hilgemann Racing	Chevrolet
38	Zane Smith	Front Row Motorsports	Ford
41	Tyler Carpenter	Niece Motorsports	Chevrolet
42	Carson Hocevar	Niece Motorsports	Chevrolet
43	Daniel Dye (R)	GMS Racing	Chevrolet
45	Lawless Alan	Niece Motorsports	Chevrolet
46	Jerry Bohlman	G2G Racing	Toyota
47	Andrew Gordon (i)	G2G Racing	Ford
51	William Byron (i)	Kyle Busch Motorsports	Chevrolet
52	Stewart Friesen	Halmar Friesen Racing	Toyota
56	Timmy Hill	Hill Motorsports	Toyota
62	Jessica Friesen	Halmar Friesen Racing	Toyota
66	Joey Logano (i)	ThorSport Racing	Ford
75	Parker Kligerman (i)	Henderson Motorsports	Chevrolet
88	Matt Crafton	ThorSport Racing	Ford
98	Ty Majeski	ThorSport Racing	Ford
99	Ben Rhodes	ThorSport Racing	Ford
Official entry list

== Heat qualifying ==
Practice was originally scheduled to be held on Friday, April 7, at 5:35 PM EST, and 8:02 PM EST, but was cancelled due to rain showers. Qualifying was held on Saturday, April 8, at 4:30 PM EST. For qualifying, drivers will be split into four different 15 lap heat races, and their finishing position will determine the starting lineup. Ben Rhodes, Stewart Friesen, Joey Logano, and Matt Crafton would win the four heat races, and Zane Smith would earn the pole.

=== Race 1 ===
Fin	St	#	Driver	Team	Make	Laps	Led	Status
1	3	99	Ben Rhodes	ThorSport Racing	Ford	15	14	Running
2	6	13	Hailie Deegan	ThorSport Racing	Ford	15	0	Running
3	2	4	Chase Purdy	Kyle Busch Motorsports	Chevrolet	15	1	Running
4	1	20	Stefan Parsons (i)	Young's Motorsports	Chevrolet	15	0	Running
5	11	17	Taylor Gray (R)	Tricon Garage	Toyota	15	0	Running
6	9	33	Mason Massey	Reaume Brothers Racing	Ford	15	0	Running
7	8	7	Jonathan Davenport (i)	Spire Motorsports	Chevrolet	15	0	Running
8	5	34	Josh Reaume	Reaume Brothers Racing	Chevrolet	15	0	Running
9	10	45	Lawless Alan	Niece Motorsports	Chevrolet	13	0	Running
10	7	02	Kris Wright	Young's Motorsports	Chevrolet	11	0	Accident
11	4	15	Tanner Gray	Tricon Garage	Toyota	11	0	Running
Official Race 1 results

=== Race 2 ===
Fin	St	#	Driver	Team	Make	Laps	Led	Status
1	4	52	Stewart Friesen	Halmar Friesen Racing	Toyota	15	15	Running
2	10	38	Zane Smith	Front Row Motorsports	Ford	15	0	Running
3	6	22	Chase Briscoe (i)	AM Racing	Ford	15	0	Running
4	3	75	Parker Kligerman (i)	Henderson Motorsports	Chevrolet	15	0	Running
5	8	19	Christian Eckes	McAnally-Hilgemann Racing	Chevrolet	15	0	Running
6	2	16	Tyler Ankrum	Hattori Racing Enterprises	Toyota	15	0	Running
7	7	35	Jake Garcia (R)	McAnally-Hilgemann Racing	Chevrolet	15	0	Running
8	9	56	Timmy Hill	Hill Motorsports	Toyota	15	0	Running
9	5	62	Jessica Friesen	Halmar Friesen Racing	Toyota	15	0	Running
10	1	9	Colby Howard	CR7 Motorsports	Chevrolet	0	0	Accident
Official Race 2 results

=== Race 3 ===
Fin	St	#	Driver	Team	Make	Laps	Led	Status
1	5	66	Joey Logano (i)	ThorSport Racing	Ford	15	8	Running
2	9	98	Ty Majeski	ThorSport Racing	Ford	15	0	Running
3	2	2	Nick Sanchez (R)	Rev Racing	Chevrolet	15	7	Running
4	7	11	Corey Heim	Tricon Garage	Toyota	15	0	Running
5	8	51	William Byron (i)	Kyle Busch Motorsports	Chevrolet	15	0	Running
6	1	25	Matt DiBenedetto	Rackley WAR	Chevrolet	15	0	Running
7	3	5	Dean Thompson	Tricon Garage	Toyota	15	0	Running
8	4	43	Daniel Dye (R)	GMS Racing	Chevrolet	15	0	Running
9	10	30	Tanner Carrick	On Point Motorsports	Toyota	3	0	Accident
10	6	46	Jerry Bohlman	G2G Racing	Toyota	0	0	Accident
Official Race 3 results

=== Race 4 ===
Fin	St	#	Driver	Team	Make	Laps	Led	Status
1	3	88	Matt Crafton	ThorSport Racing	Ford	15	9	Running
2	2	24	Rajah Caruth (R)	GMS Racing	Chevrolet	15	6	Running
3	10	04	Kaden Honeycutt	Roper Racing	Ford	15	0	Running
4	7	23	Grant Enfinger	GMS Racing	Chevrolet	15	0	Running
5	5	12	Spencer Boyd	Young's Motorsports	Chevrolet	15	1	Running
6	8	32	Bret Holmes (R)	Bret Holmes Racing	Chevrolet	15	0	Running
7	6	42	Carson Hocevar	Niece Motorsports	Chevrolet	15	0	Running
8	9	6	Norm Benning	Norm Benning Racing	Chevrolet	15	0	Running
9	4	41	Tyler Carpenter	Niece Motorsports	Chevrolet	15	0	Running
10	1	47	Andrew Gordon (i)	G2G Racing	Ford	14	0	Running
Official Race 4 results

=== Starting lineup ===
Pos.	#	Driver	Team	Make
1	38	Zane Smith	Front Row Motorsports	Ford
2	98	Ty Majeski	ThorSport Racing	Ford
3	04	Kaden Honeycutt	Roper Racing	Ford
4	66	Joey Logano (i)	ThorSport Racing	Ford
5	52	Stewart Friesen	Halmar Friesen Racing	Toyota
6	13	Hailie Deegan	ThorSport Racing	Ford
7	99	Ben Rhodes	ThorSport Racing	Ford
8	88	Matt Crafton	ThorSport Racing	Ford
9	17	Taylor Gray (R)	Tricon Garage	Toyota
10	22	Chase Briscoe (i)	AM Racing	Ford
11	23	Grant Enfinger	GMS Racing	Chevrolet
12	11	Corey Heim	Tricon Garage	Toyota
13	19	Christian Eckes	McAnally-Hilgemann Racing	Chevrolet
14	51	William Byron (i)	Kyle Busch Motorsports	Chevrolet
15	24	Rajah Caruth (R)	GMS Racing	Chevrolet
16	4	Chase Purdy	Kyle Busch Motorsports	Chevrolet
17	2	Nick Sanchez (R)	Rev Racing	Chevrolet
18	33	Mason Massey	Reaume Brothers Racing	Ford
19	32	Bret Holmes (R)	Bret Holmes Racing	Chevrolet
20	20	Stefan Parsons (i)	Young's Motorsports	Chevrolet
21	75	Parker Kligerman (i)	Henderson Motorsports	Chevrolet
22	12	Spencer Boyd	Young's Motorsports	Chevrolet
23	16	Tyler Ankrum	Hattori Racing Enterprises	Toyota
24	25	Matt DiBenedetto	Rackley WAR	Chevrolet
25	7	Jonathan Davenport (i)	Spire Motorsports	Chevrolet
26	35	Jake Garcia (R)	McAnally-Hilgemann Racing	Chevrolet
27	42	Carson Hocevar	Niece Motorsports	Chevrolet
28	56	Timmy Hill	Hill Motorsports	Ford
29	5	Dean Thompson	Tricon Garage	Toyota
30	6	Norm Benning	Norm Benning Racing	Chevrolet
31	30	Tanner Carrick	On Point Motorsports	Toyota
Qualified by owner's points
32	43	Daniel Dye (R)	GMS Racing	Chevrolet
33	41	Tyler Carpenter	Niece Motorsports	Chevrolet
34	15	Tanner Gray	Tricon Garage	Toyota
35	9	Colby Howard	CR7 Motorsports	Chevrolet
36	02	Kris Wright	Young's Motorsports	Chevrolet
Failed to qualify
37	45	Lawless Alan	Niece Motorsports	Chevrolet
38	34	Josh Reaume	Reaume Brothers Racing	Ford
39	62	Jessica Friesen	Halmar Friesen Racing	Toyota
40	46	Jerry Bohlman	G2G Racing	Toyota
41	47	Andrew Gordon (i)	G2G Racing	Ford
Official starting lineup

== Race results ==
Stage 1 Laps: 40

Pos.	#	Driver	Team	Make	Pts
1	66	Joey Logano (i)	ThorSport Racing	Ford	0
2	98	Ty Majeski	ThorSport Racing	Ford	9
3	51	William Byron (i)	Kyle Busch Motorsports	Chevrolet	0
4	04	Kaden Honeycutt	Roper Racing	Ford	7
5	88	Matt Crafton	ThorSport Racing	Ford	6
6	13	Hailie Deegan	ThorSport Racing	Ford	5
7	23	Grant Enfinger	GMS Racing	Chevrolet	4
8	38	Zane Smith	Front Row Motorsports	Ford	3
9	52	Stewart Friesen	Halmar Friesen Racing	Toyota	2
10	75	Parker Kligerman (i)	Henderson Motorsports	Chevrolet	0

Stage 2 Laps: 50

Pos.	#	Driver	Team	Make	Pts
1	66	Joey Logano (i)	ThorSport Racing	Ford	0
2	98	Ty Majeski	ThorSport Racing	Ford	9
3	51	William Byron (i)	Kyle Busch Motorsports	Chevrolet	0
4	52	Stewart Friesen	Halmar Friesen Racing	Toyota	7
5	25	Matt DiBenedetto	Rackley WAR	Chevrolet	6
6	15	Tanner Gray	Tricon Garage	Toyota	5
7	88	Matt Crafton	ThorSport Racing	Ford	4
8	38	Zane Smith	Front Row Motorsports	Ford	3
9	22	Chase Briscoe (i)	AM Racing	Ford	0
10	32	Bret Holmes (R)	Bret Holmes Racing	Chevrolet	1

Stage 3 Laps: 60

Fin	St	#	Driver	Team	Make	Laps	Led	Status	Pts
1	4	66	Joey Logano (i)	ThorSport Racing	Ford	150	138	Running	0
2	2	98	Ty Majeski	ThorSport Racing	Ford	150	1	Running	53
3	14	51	William Byron (i)	Kyle Busch Motorsports	Chevrolet	150	0	Running	0
4	8	88	Matt Crafton	ThorSport Racing	Ford	150	0	Running	43
5	11	23	Grant Enfinger	GMS Racing	Chevrolet	150	0	Running	36
6	26	35	Jake Garcia (R)	McAnally-Hilgemann Racing	Chevrolet	150	0	Running	31
7	10	22	Chase Briscoe (i)	AM Racing	Ford	150	0	Running	0
8	34	15	Tanner Gray	Tricon Garage	Toyota	150	0	Running	34
9	3	04	Kaden Honeycutt	Roper Racing	Ford	150	0	Running	35
10	24	25	Matt DiBenedetto	Rackley WAR	Chevrolet	150	11	Running	33
11	15	24	Rajah Caruth (R)	GMS Racing	Chevrolet	150	0	Running	26
12	29	5	Dean Thompson	Tricon Garage	Toyota	150	0	Running	25
13	6	13	Hailie Deegan	ThorSport Racing	Ford	150	0	Running	29
14	25	7	Jonathan Davenport (i)	Spire Motorsports	Chevrolet	150	0	Running	0
15	12	11	Corey Heim	Tricon Garage	Toyota	150	0	Running	22
16	22	12	Spencer Boyd	Young's Motorsports	Chevrolet	150	0	Running	21
17	27	42	Carson Hocevar	Niece Motorsports	Chevrolet	150	0	Running	20
18	17	2	Nick Sanchez (R)	Rev Racing	Chevrolet	150	0	Running	19
19	7	99	Ben Rhodes	ThorSport Racing	Ford	150	0	Running	18
20	19	32	Bret Holmes (R)	Bret Holmes Racing	Chevrolet	150	0	Running	18
21	1	38	Zane Smith	Front Row Motorsports	Ford	150	0	Running	22
22	32	43	Daniel Dye (R)	GMS Racing	Chevrolet	150	0	Running	15
23	5	52	Stewart Friesen	Halmar Friesen Racing	Toyota	150	0	Running	23
24	30	6	Norm Benning	Norm Benning Racing	Chevrolet	150	0	Running	13
25	28	56	Timmy Hill	Hill Motorsports	Toyota	148	0	Running	12
26	31	30	Tanner Carrick	On Point Motorsports	Toyota	147	0	Running	11
27	35	9	Colby Howard	CR7 Motorsports	Chevrolet	147	0	Running	10
28	16	4	Chase Purdy	Kyle Busch Motorsports	Chevrolet	147	0	Running	9
29	33	41	Tyler Carpenter	Niece Motorsports	Chevrolet	117	0	Accident	8
30	13	19	Christian Eckes	McAnally-Hilgemann Racing	Chevrolet	96	0	Accident	7
31	21	75	Parker Kligerman (i)	Henderson Motorsports	Chevrolet	85	0	Accident	0
32	36	02	Kris Wright	Young's Motorsports	Chevrolet	75	0	Accident	5
33	23	16	Tyler Ankrum	Hattori Racing Enterprises	Toyota	25	0	Accident	4
34	9	17	Taylor Gray (R)	Tricon Garage	Toyota	8	0	Accident	3
35	18	33	Mason Massey	Reaume Brothers Racing	Ford	7	0	Accident	2
36	20	20	Stefan Parsons (i)	Young's Motorsports	Chevrolet	7	0	Accident	0
Official race results

== Standings after the race ==
Drivers' Championship standings

	Pos	Driver	Points
	1	Ty Majeski	259
	2	Zane Smith	225 (-34)
	3	Ben Rhodes	212 (-47)
1	4	Matt Crafton	198 (-61)
1	5	Christian Eckes	194 (-65)
	6	Grant Enfinger	188 (-71)
	7	Corey Heim	170 (-89)
4	8	Tanner Gray	156 (-103)
5	9	Matt DiBenedetto	150 (-109)
1	10	Nick Sanchez	148 (-111)
Official driver's standings

- Note: Only the first 10 positions are included for the driver standings.

Previous race: 2023 SpeedyCash.com 250	NASCAR Craftsman Truck Series; 2023 season	Next race: 2023 Long John Silver's 200
