= Halmar Friesen Racing =

NASCAR and dirt racing team

- Owner(s): Chris Larsen; Stewart Friesen
- Base: Statesville, North Carolina
- Series: NASCAR Craftsman Truck Series
- Race drivers: 52. Stewart Friesen; 62. TBA
- Manufacturer: Toyota
- Opened: 2016

Career
- Debut: 2016 Aspen Dental Eldora Dirt Derby (Eldora)
- Latest race: 2026 Craftsman 200 (Homestead)
- Races competed: 238
- Drivers' Championships: 0
- Race victories: 5
- Pole positions: 3

Halmar Friesen Racing, also known as Halmar Racing Team, is an American professional stock car racing and dirt track racing team that currently competes in the NASCAR Craftsman Truck Series, fielding the No. 52 Toyota Tundra for Stewart Friesen full-time and the No. 62 Toyota full-time for multiple drivers.

The team also fields modified racing cars for several drivers around the Northeastern United States, including for Stewart and his wife Jessica.

== Craftsman Truck Series ==
=== Truck No. 16 history ===
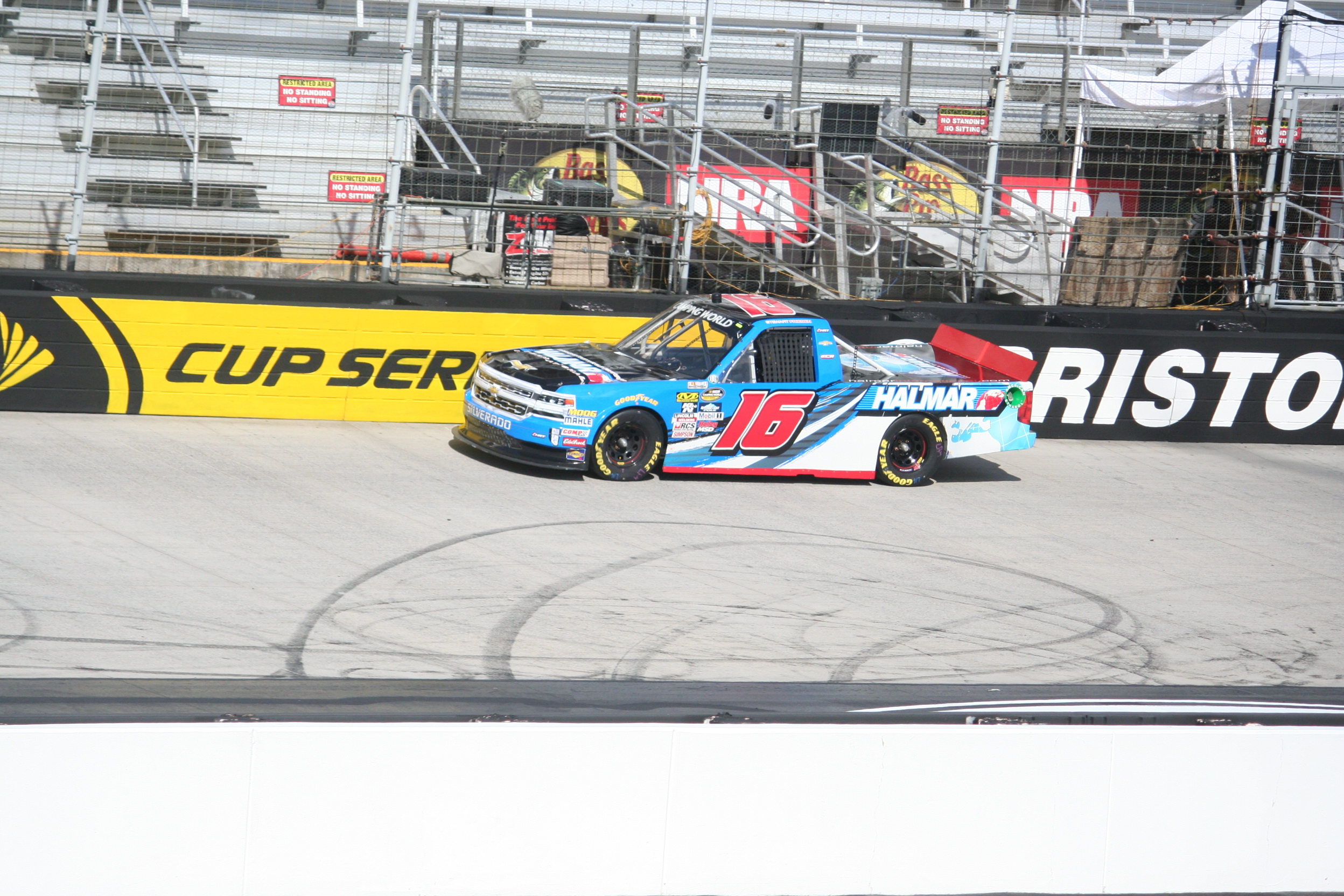
Stewart Friesen driving the No. 16 at Bristol in 2016

The team ran part-time in 2016, using the No. 16 and entering the short track races with Friesen as driver. For the team's debut race at Eldora, the truck had a body from Kyle Busch Motorsports and an engine from Richard Childress Racing.

==== Truck No. 16 results ====
Year	Driver	No.	Make	1	2	3	4	5	6	7	8	9	10	11	12	13	14	15	16	17	18	19	20	21	22	23	NCTC	Pts
2016	Stewart Friesen	16	Chevy	DAY	ATL	MAR	KAN	DOV	CLT	TEX	IOW	GTW	KEN	ELD; 28	POC	BRI; 22	MCH	MSP	CHI	NHA; 13	LVS; 19	TAL	MAR	TEX	PHO; 18	HOM; 29	33rd	69

=== Truck No. 52 history ===
Stewart Friesen (2017–present)

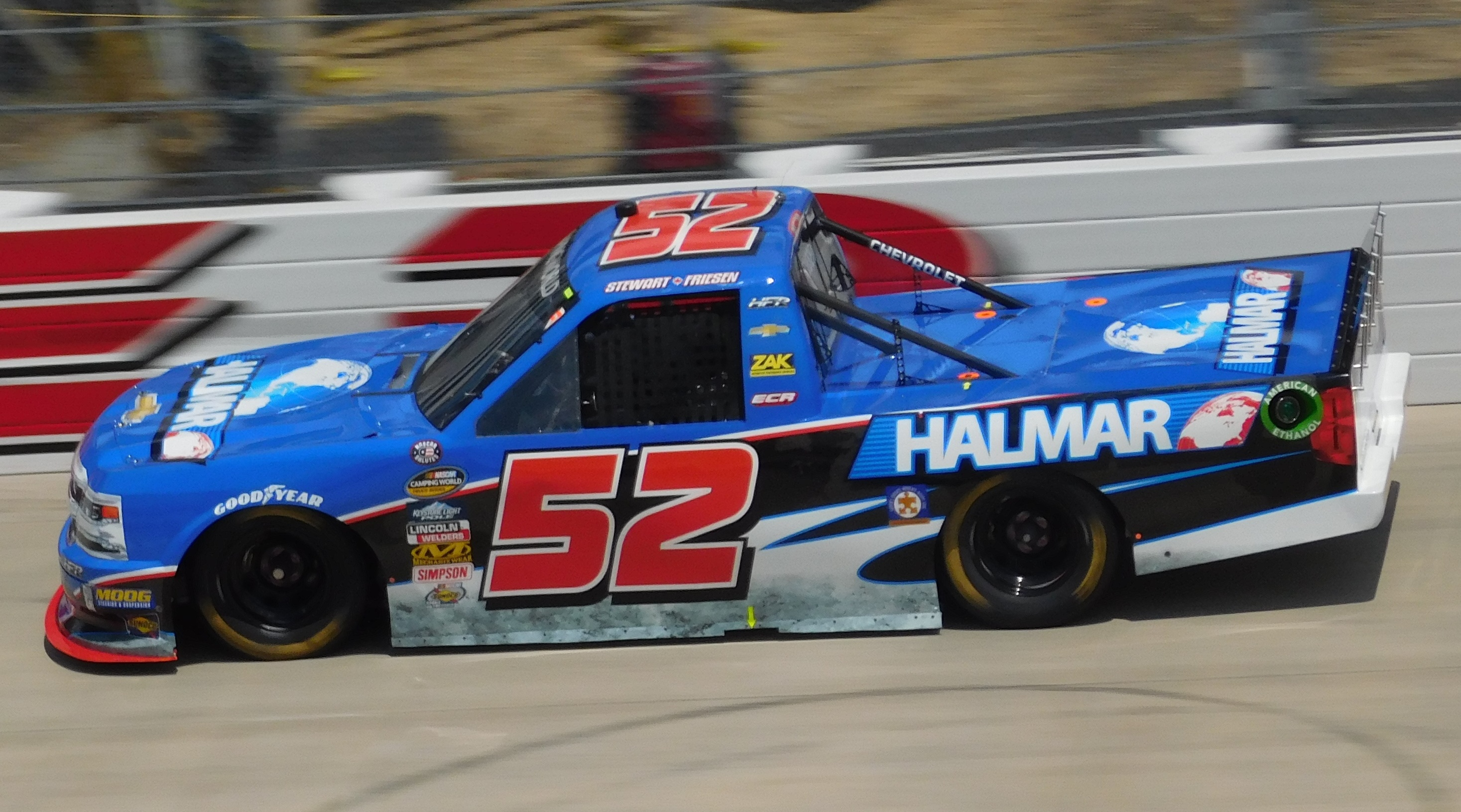
Stewart Friesen driving the No. 52 at Dover in 2017

In 2017, the team announced plans to run the full Truck Series schedule as Halmar Friesen Racing with Friesen driving the No. 52 truck. HFR hired Cup Series team owner Tommy Baldwin Jr. of Tommy Baldwin Racing (which reduced from a full-time to a part-time Cup Series schedule in 2017) to serve as team manager. After the June Texas race, the team announced a two-race hiatus and that they would return in Kentucky in July. Friesen captured the pole for the 2017 Eldora Dirt Derby and finished second to Matt Crafton in the race after leading over half of the laps. On August 23, HFR announced the end of its partnership with Baldwin and the start of a new technical alliance with GMS Racing. The same day the team announce that Tommy Baldwin's brother in law, longtime NASCAR crew chief, Trip Bruce would take over running the team and has remained a staple at HFR from 2018 to 2021 as Stewart's Crew Chief and in 2022 moved into the role of Director of Competition.

For 2018, HFR continued the alliance with GMS, so much so that GMS driver Johnny Sauter referenced Friesen as a teammate. After advancing to the playoffs and a best finish of second on three occasions throughout the year, he finished seventh in the final points standings after being eliminated in the Round of 8.

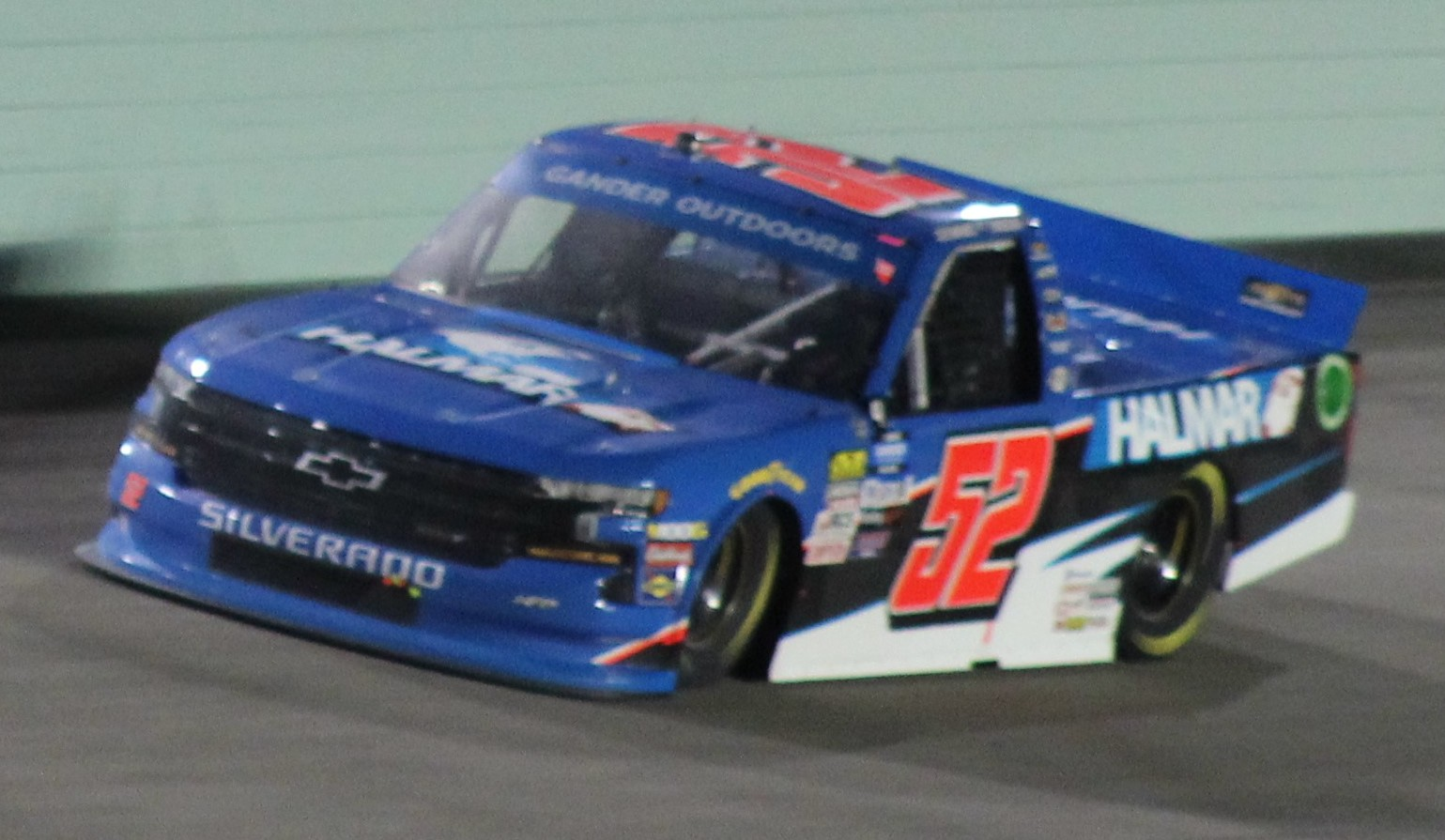
Friesen's 2019 truck at Homestead–Miami Speedway

On July 11, 2019, NASCAR confiscated the No. 52 truck before the Kentucky race after discovering an issue with the firewall during pre-race inspection. The team was able to use their backup truck, which finished second in the race. On August 1, 2019, Friesen finally broke through to win his first career NASCAR Gander Outdoors Truck Series race at Eldora. Friesen would also go onto win at Phoenix Raceway later that year.

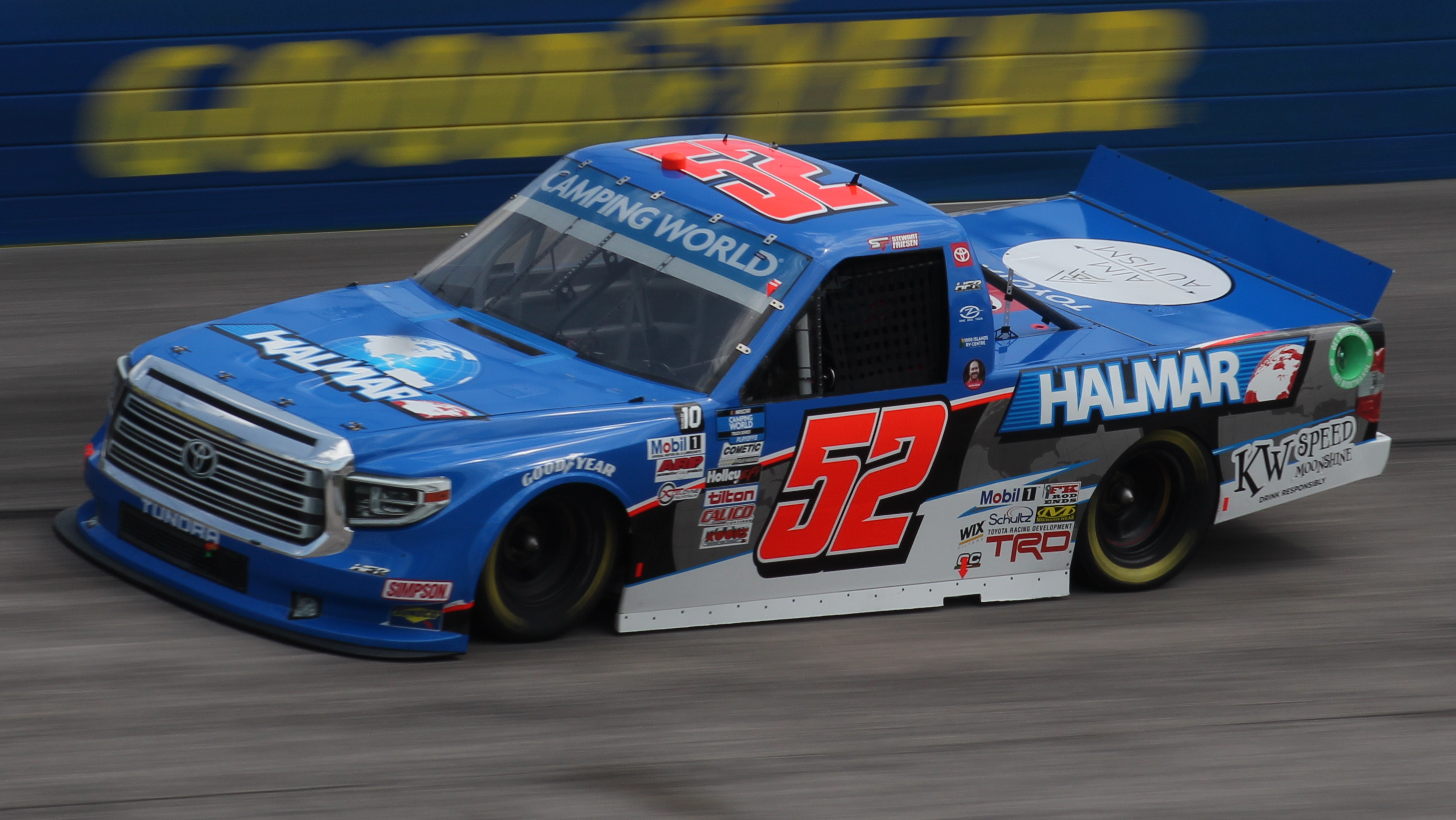
Stewart Friesen driving the No. 52 at Darlington in September 2021

On December 3, 2019, it was announced that the team would switch from Chevrolet to Toyota in an alliance with Kyle Busch Motorsports starting in 2020, thus ending their previous alliance with GMS Racing. In 2020, after Friesen missed the playoffs, he decided to skip the race at Kansas Speedway in October in order to compete in a dirt race on the same day. Timothy Peters would fill in for Friesen in the No. 52 in the Truck Series race. Friesen would run his fourth full season in the Truck Series in 2021 and would make the playoffs again despite not winning any races that year.

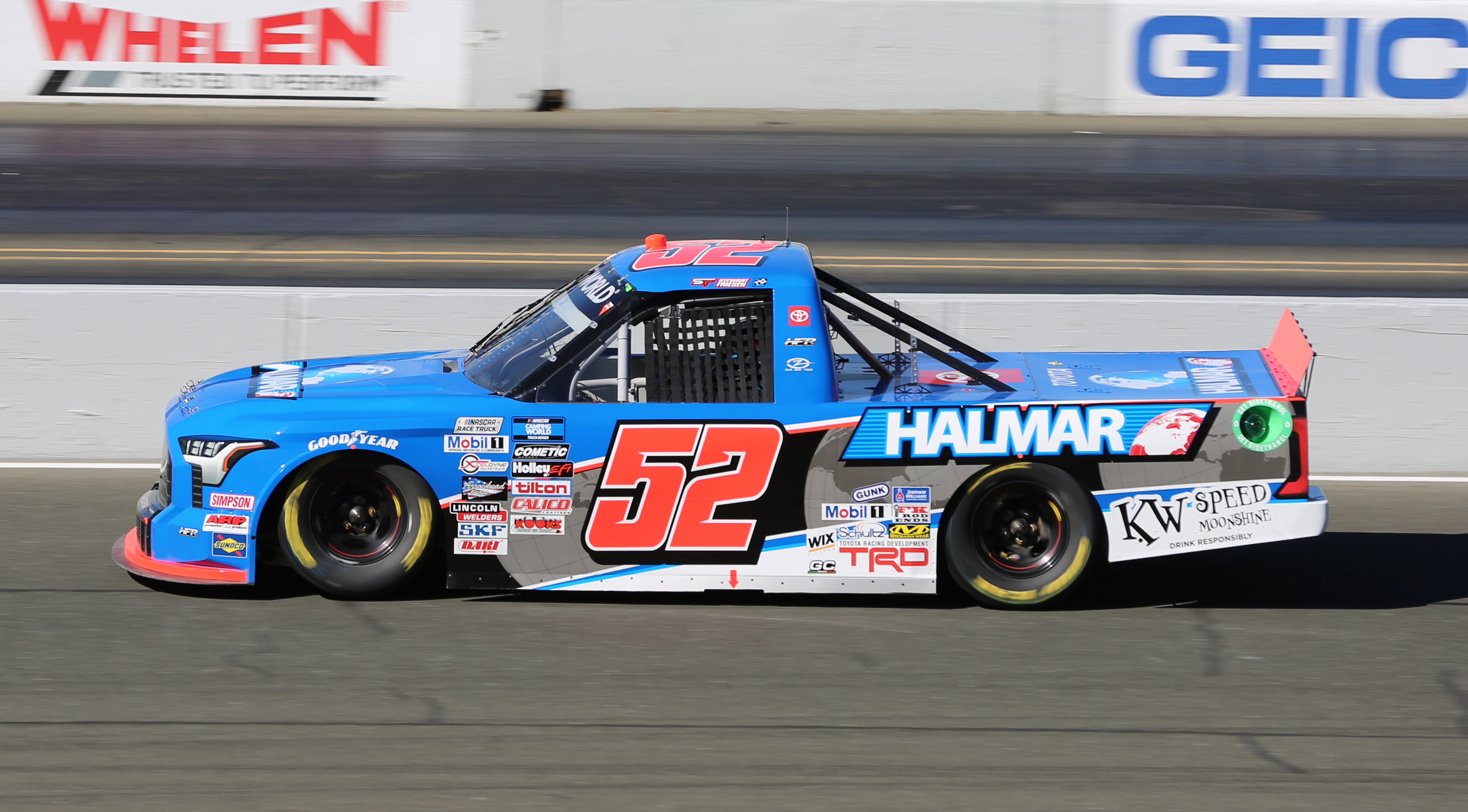
Friesen's No. 52 truck at Sonoma Raceway in 2022

On May 20, 2022, Friesen broke a 54-race winless streak in the Truck Series by scoring his third career victory at Texas Motor Speedway after passing Christian Eckes for the lead in overtime. Friesen returned to the Truck Series in 2023. He scored five top-fives and seven top-tens, but went winless and missed the playoffs. He finished twelfth in the final standings. The 2024 season would follow a similar trend, with Friesen scoring seven top-ten finishes and one top-five, as well as a pole at Nashville. He would again finish twelfth in the standings.

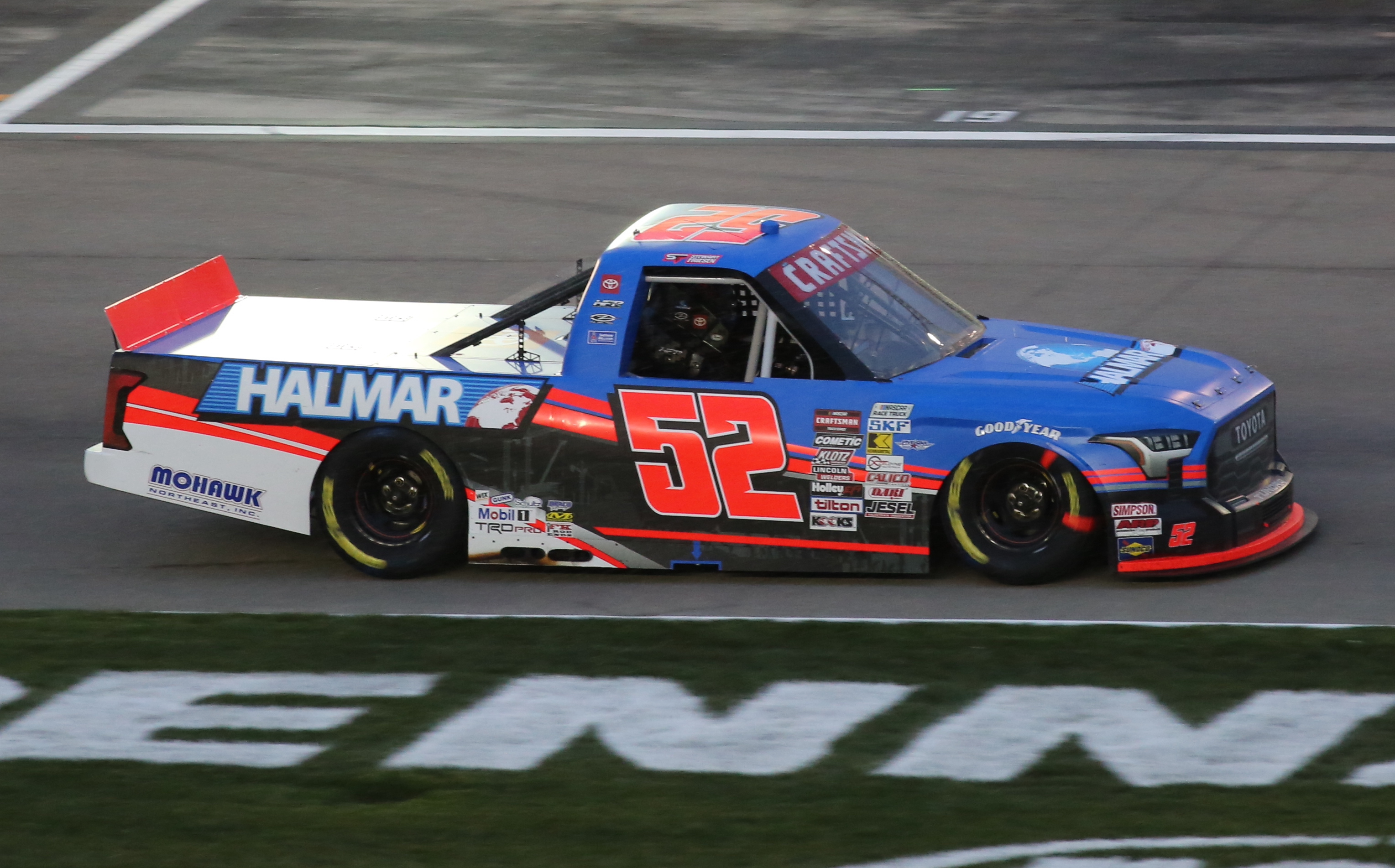
Friesen's No. 52 truck at Las Vegas Motor Speedway in 2025

Friesen started the 2025 season with a 23rd-place finish at Daytona. Friesen broke a 72-race drought with a win at Michigan in triple-overtime. In late July, Friesen was involved in a high-speed accident while competing in a Super DIRTcar Series event at Autodrome Drummond. Friesen sustained fractures to his pelvis and right leg. Christopher Bell substituted for Friesen at Watkins Glen, while Kaden Honeycutt substituted for Friesen for the final eight races, starting at Richmond.

==== Truck No. 52 results ====
Year	Driver	No.	Make	1	2	3	4	5	6	7	8	9	10	11	12	13	14	15	16	17	18	19	20	21	22	23	24	25	NCTC	Pts
2017	Stewart Friesen	52	Chevy	DAY; 31	ATL; 19	MAR; 25	KAN; 32	CLT; 23	DOV; 28	TEX; 22	GTW	IOW	KEN; 12	ELD; 2*	POC; 12	MCH; 13	BRI; 29	MSP	CHI	NHA; 5	LVS; 23	TAL; 17	MAR; 6	TEX; 14	PHO; 6	HOM; 7			14th	422
2018	Stewart Friesen	52	Chevy	DAY; 27	ATL; 6	LVS; 5	MAR; 20	DOV; 23	KAN; 3	CLT; 6	TEX; 2	IOW; 9	GTW; 13	CHI; 19	KEN; 2	ELD; 3	POC; 4	MCH; 8	BRI; 2	MSP; 7	LVS; 17	TAL; 6	MAR; 11	TEX; 8	PHO; 5	HOM; 4			7th	2265
2019	Stewart Friesen	52	Chevy	DAY; 10	ATL; 18	LVS; 4	MAR; 5	TEX; 2	DOV; 12	KAN; 15*	CLT; 3	TEX; 20	IOW; 5	GTW; 3	CHI; 3	KEN; 2	POC; 32	ELD; 1	MCH; 8	BRI; 4	MSP; 7	LVS; 19	TAL; 5	MAR; 6	PHO; 1	HOM; 11			4th	4026
2020	Stewart Friesen	52	Toyota	DAY; 21	LVS; 9	CLT; 30	ATL; 10	HOM; 14	POC; 8	KEN; 15	TEX; 4	KAN; 27	KAN; 34	MCH; 39	DRC; 10	DOV; 9	GTW; 5	DAR; 8	RCH; 10	BRI; 32	LVS; 4	TAL; 17		TEX; 28	MAR; 6	PHO; 6			15th	504
2020	Timothy Peters	52	Toyota																				KAN; 7						15th	504
2021	Stewart Friesen	52	Toyota	DAY; 32	DRC; 11	LVS; 4	ATL; 10	BRD; 12	RCH; 13	KAN; 14	DAR; 25	COA; 17	CLT; 4	TEX; 34	NSH; 5	POC; 33	KNX; 27	GLN; 20	GTW; 4	DAR; 3	BRI; 4	LVS; 6	TAL; 22	MAR; 17	PHO; 2				6th	2275
2022	Stewart Friesen	52	Toyota	DAY; 16	LVS; 3	ATL; 6*	COA; 9	MAR; 13	BRD; 11	DAR; 12	KAN; 14	TEX; 1*	CLT; 9	GTW; 4	SON; 31	KNX; 5	NSH; 5	MOH; 4	POC; 14	IRP; 4	RCH; 11	KAN; 20	BRI; 7	TAL; 20	HOM; 3	PHO; 5			6th	2276
2023	Stewart Friesen	52	Toyota	DAY; 28	LVS; 14	ATL; 22	COA; 14	TEX; 3	BRD; 23	MAR; 31	KAN; 4	DAR; 2	NWS; 13	CLT; 22	GTW; 3	NSH; 18	MOH; 4	POC; 32	RCH; 27	IRP; 30	MLW; 30	KAN; 7	BRI; 14	TAL; 34	HOM; 6	PHO; 24			12th	537
2024	Stewart Friesen	52	Toyota	DAY; 14	ATL; 23	LVS; 18	BRI; 22	COA; 20	MAR; 19	TEX; 13	KAN; 25	DAR; 14	NWS; 10	CLT; 2	GTW; 8	NSH; 11	POC; 7	IRP; 33	RCH; 25	MLW; 20	BRI; 9	KAN; 24	TAL; 13	HOM; 6	MAR; 10	PHO; 18			12th	557
2025	Stewart Friesen	52	Toyota	DAY; 23	ATL; 2	LVS; 6	HOM; 16	MAR; 9	BRI; 27	CAR; 29	TEX; 24	KAN; 5	NWS; 14	CLT; 13	NSH; 21	MCH; 1	POC; 8	LRP; 23	IRP; 35										3rd	4034
2025	Christopher Bell	52	Toyota																	GLN; 4									3rd	4034
2025	Kaden Honeycutt	52	Toyota																		RCH; 10	DAR; 18	BRI; 12	NHA; 7	ROV; 14	TAL; 10	MAR; 2	PHO; 3	3rd	4034
2026	Stewart Friesen	52	Toyota	DAY; 10	ATL; 20	STP; 26	DAR; 25	ROC; 4	BRI; 16	TEX; 19	GLN; 18	DOV; 11	CLT; 26	NSH; 6	MCH; 22	COR; 33	LRP; 9	NWS; 8	IRP; 6	RCH; 36	NHA; 4	BRI; 3	KAN; 21	CLT; 35	PHO; 19	TAL; 30	MAR; 30	HOM; 5	18th	536

=== Truck No. 62 history ===
Jessica Friesen (2021)

On March 11, 2021, Jessica Friesen announced that she would make her Truck Series debut in the Bristol dirt race, driving the No. 62 and competing alongside her husband. However, she failed to qualify after rain washed out the heat races. Instead, she would make her debut in the other dirt race for the Truck Series at Knoxville Raceway, the Corn Belt 150. Jessica finished 26th, one position better than Stewart.

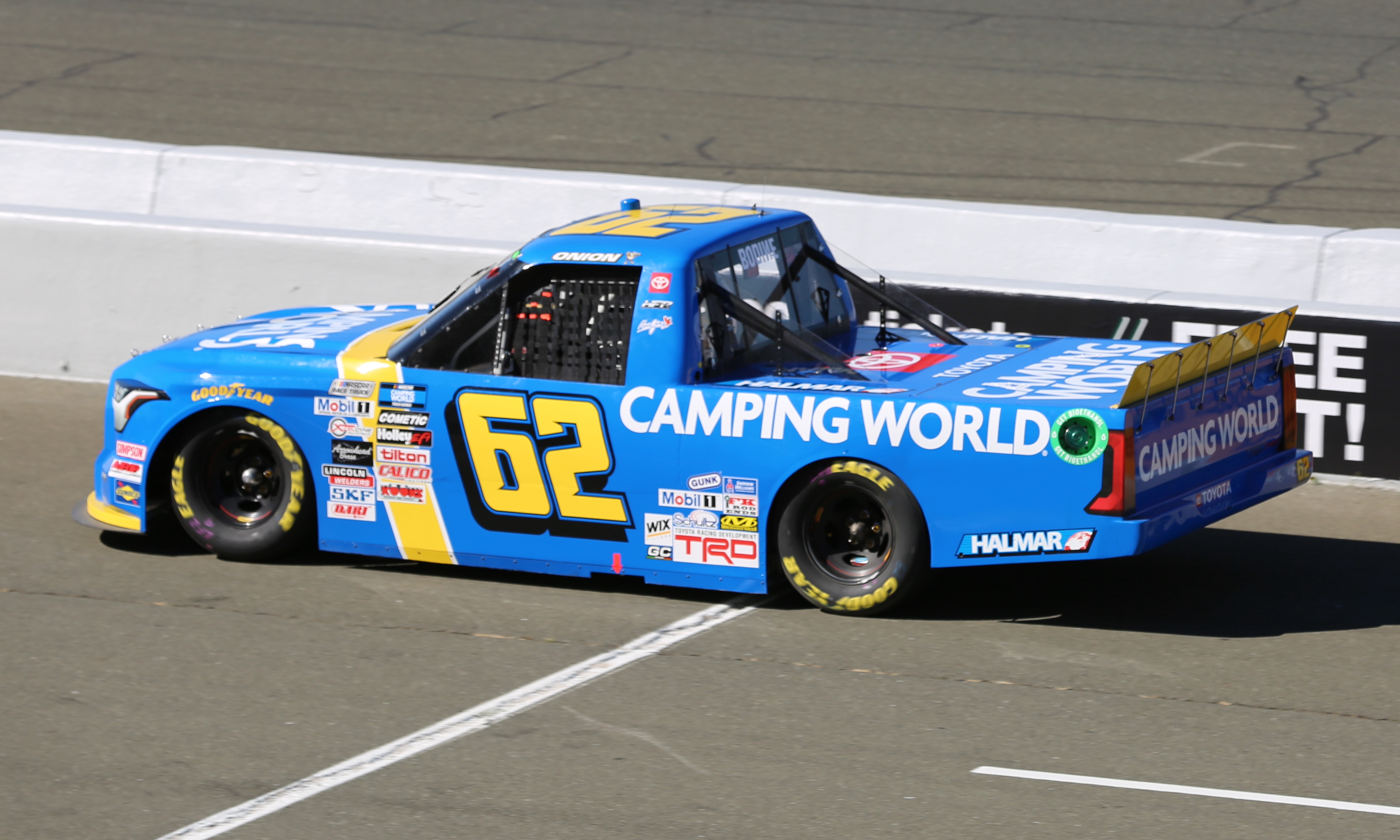
Todd Bodine in the No. 62 at Sonoma Raceway in 2022

Multiple drivers (2022)

After having not driven in NASCAR for five years, Todd Bodine returned to the Truck Series to drive for Halmar Friesen Racing in the No. 62 at Las Vegas. The CEO of series title sponsor Camping World, Marcus Lemonis, stated that Camping World would sponsor Bodine for six races to get him to 800 overall starts in NASCAR. Bodine would compete in the 6 races during which he would finish five races, lead three laps, and score a top-ten finish at Darlington. In his 800th and final overall NASCAR race at Pocono, Bodine would finish 36th after he crashed twelve laps into the race.

On March 28, 2022, the team announced that Jessica Friesen would return to drive the No. 62 in the two dirt races again. She would fail to qualify at Bristol for the second consecutive year. She would go onto to race at Knoxville where she had a rollover crash on lap 58 after hitting the tracks berm. The accident was not shown in the Fox Sports broadcast of the race. Jessica would remain in the race after the accident, finishing 34th.

In July 2022, it was announced that NASCAR Advance Auto Parts Weekly Series driver Layne Riggs would make his Truck Series debut, driving the No. 62 truck at IRP, and would finish seventh. The next race at Richmond, Riggs would qualify 4th, but would finish the race two laps down in nineteenth place. Riggs would make his final start of the year at the season finale at Phoenix where he would qualify second and lead five laps early in the race, but he would later drop back and finish thirteenth.

Jessica Friesen (2023)

In 2023, Jessica would return to the series but would fail to qualify for the Bristol dirt race.

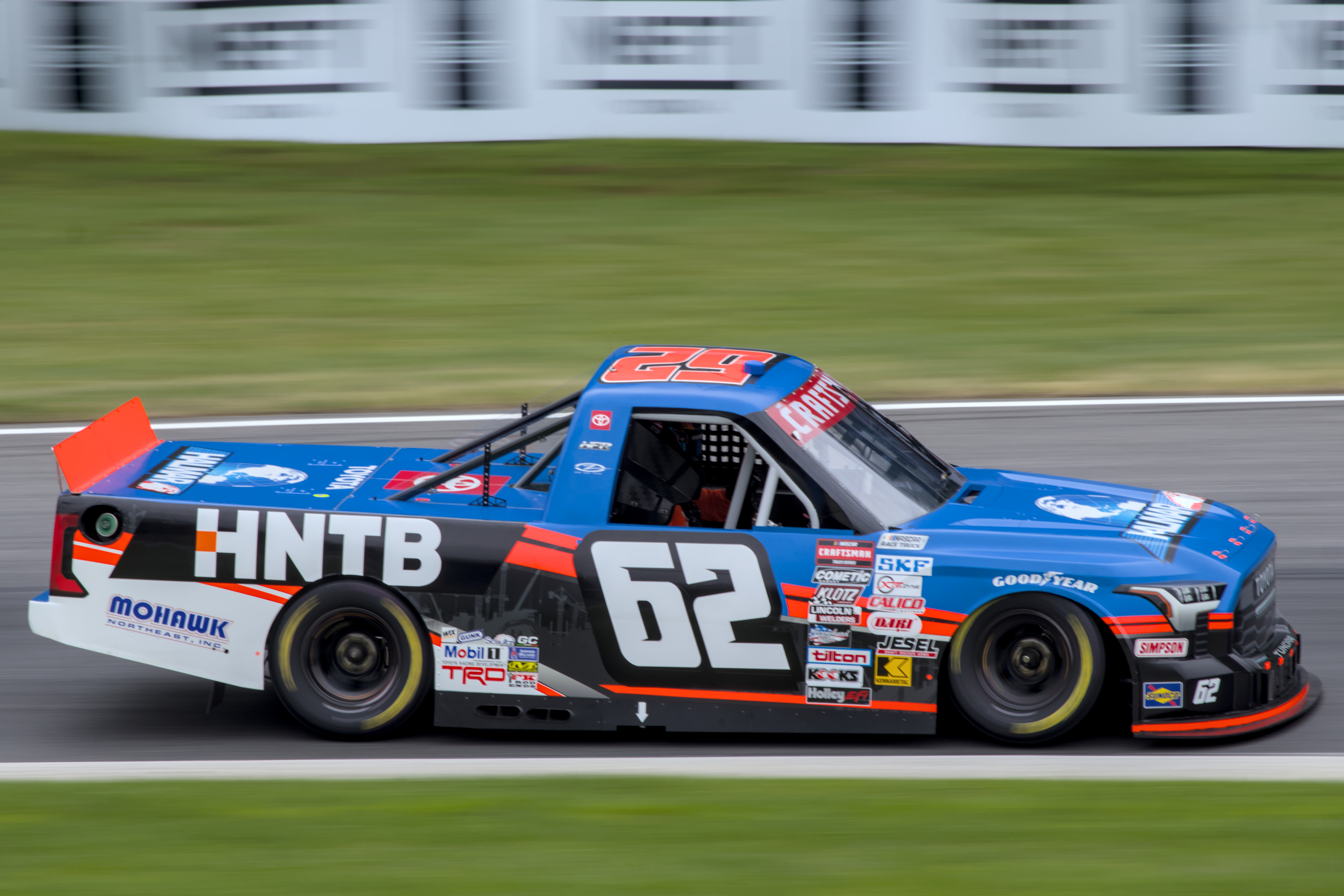
Wesley Slimp in the No. 62 at Lime Rock Park in 2025

Multiple drivers (2025)

On June 23, 2025, it was announced that Wesley Slimp would make his Truck Series debut at Lime Rock Park, with Slimp competing at all three road course races as part of the deal. On August 10, it was announced that Super Late Model standout Cole Butcher would make his Truck Series debut at Bristol. On August 29, it was announced that Mike Christopher Jr. (nephew of the late Ted Christopher) will make his NASCAR Craftsman Truck Series debut at New Hampshire.

Full-time entry (2026-)

Beginning in 2026, the No. 62 became the team’s second full-time entry. John Hunter Nemechek was announced as the first driver.

==== Truck No. 62 results ====
Year	Driver	No.	Make	1	2	3	4	5	6	7	8	9	10	11	12	13	14	15	16	17	18	19	20	21	22	23	24	25	NCTC	Pts
2021	Jessica Friesen	62	Toyota	DAY	DRC	LVS	ATL	BRD; DNQ	RCH	KAN	DAR	COA	CLT	TEX	NSH	POC	KNX; 26	GLN	GTW	DAR	BRI	LVS	TAL	MAR	PHO				78th	11
2022	Todd Bodine	62	Toyota	DAY	LVS; 21	ATL	COA	MAR		DAR; 10	KAN	TEX; 13	CLT	GTW	SON; 20		NSH; 27	MOH	POC; 36										34th	177
2022	Jessica Friesen	62	Toyota						BRD; DNQ							KNX; 34													34th	177
2022	Layne Riggs	62	Toyota																	IRP; 7	RCH; 19	KAN	BRI	TAL	HOM	PHO; 13			34th	177
2023	Jessica Friesen	62	Toyota	DAY	LVS	ATL	COA	TEX	BRD; DNQ	MAR	KAN	DAR	NWS	CLT	GTW	NSH	MOH	POC	RCH	IRP	MLW	KAN	BRI	TAL	HOM	PHO			56th	0
2025	Wesley Slimp	62	Toyota	DAY	ATL	LVS	HOM	MAR	BRI	CAR	TEX	KAN	NWS	CLT	NSH	MCH	POC	LRP; 33	IRP	GLN; 12	RCH	DAR			ROV; 27	TAL	MAR		36th	91
2025	Cole Butcher	62	Toyota																				BRI; 23					PHO; 23	36th	91
2025	Mike Christopher Jr.	62	Toyota																					NHA; 13					36th	91
2026	John Hunter Nemechek	62	Toyota	DAY; 5	ATL; 8																								16th	588
2026	Wesley Slimp	62	Toyota			STP; 36					GLN; 34						LRP; 16												16th	588
2026	Christopher Bell	62	Toyota				DAR; 6		BRI; 1			DOV; 5			MCH; 6			NWS; 15			NHA; 7								16th	588
2026	Mike Christopher Jr.	62	Toyota					ROC; 23											IRP; 10										16th	588
2026	Cory Roper	62	Toyota							TEX; 34																TAL; 18			16th	588
2026	Leland Honeyman	62	Toyota										CLT; 23							RCH; 17			KAN; 30	CLT; 30	PHO; 34			HOM; 29	16th	588
2026	Parker Retzlaff	62	Toyota											NSH; 11															16th	588
2026	Kaz Grala	62	Toyota													COR; 3													16th	588
2026	William Sawalich	62	Toyota																			BRI; 7							16th	588
2026	Kasey Kleyn	62	Toyota																								MAR; 16		16th	588

The team is also known as Halmar Racing Team

=== Truck No. 72 history ===
Mike Christopher Jr. (2026)

On August 15, 2026, it was announced that Mike Christopher Jr. would compete in the Truck Series race at New Hampshire in a third entry for HFR.

==== Truck No. 72 results ====
Year	Driver	No.	Make	1	2	3	4	5	6	7	8	9	10	11	12	13	14	15	16	17	18	19	20	21	22	23	24	25	NCTC	Pts
2026	Mike Christopher Jr.	72	Toyota	DAY	ATL	STP	DAR	CAR	BRI	TEX	GLN	DOV	CLT	NSH	MCH	COR	LRP	NWS	IRP	RCH	NHA; 12	BRI	KAN	CLT	PHO	TAL	MAR	HOM	42nd	25
