= 2022 Toyota 200 =

2022 Toyota 200 presented by CK Power
Race details
- Race 11 of 23 of the 2022 NASCAR Camping World Truck Series
- Date: June 4, 2022
- Official name: 22nd Annual Toyota 200 presented by CK Power
- Location: Madison, Illinois, Gateway Motorsports Park
- Course: Permanent racing facility
- Course length: 1.25 miles (2.01 km)
- Distance: 165 laps, 206.25 mi (330.72 km)
- Scheduled distance: 160 laps, 200 mi (321.869 km)
- Average speed: 86.397 mph (139.042 km/h)

Pole position
Driver	Corey Heim	Kyle Busch Motorsports
- Time: 32.554

Most laps led
Driver	Ben Rhodes	ThorSport Racing
- Laps: 43

Winner
No. 51	Corey Heim	Kyle Busch Motorsports

Television in the United States
- Network: Fox Sports 1
- Announcers: Vince Welch, Kurt Busch, and Michael Waltrip

Radio in the United States
- Radio: Motor Racing Network

The 2022 Toyota 200 presented by CK Power was the eleventh stock car race of the 2022 NASCAR Camping World Truck Series and the 22nd iteration of the event. The race was held on Saturday, June 4, 2022, in Madison, Illinois at Gateway Motorsports Park, a 1.25 miles (2.01 km) permanent quad-oval racetrack. The race was increased from 160 laps to 165 laps, due to an overtime finish. Corey Heim, driving for Kyle Busch Motorsports, would take advantage of the lead on the final restart, and win the race after the caution came out on the last lap. This was Heim's second career NASCAR Camping World Truck Series win, and his second of the season. To fill out the podium, Christian Eckes of ThorSport Racing and Chandler Smith of Kyle Busch Motorsports would finish 2nd and 3rd, respectively.

Three drivers made their debut in this race: Rajah Caruth, Mason Maggio, and Jake Garcia. Justin Carroll was scheduled to make his debut as well, but would fail to qualify.

== Background ==
Gateway Motorsports Park is a motorsport racing facility in Madison, Illinois. It features a 1.25 mi (2.01 km) oval that hosts the NASCAR and the IndyCar Series, a 1.6-mile (2.6 km) infield road course used by the SCCA, Porsche Club of America, and various car clubs, and a quarter-mile drag strip that hosts the annual NHRA Midwest Nationals event.

=== Entry list ===
- (R) denotes rookie driver.
- (i) denotes driver who are ineligible for series driver points.

#	Driver	Team	Make
1	Hailie Deegan	David Gilliland Racing	Ford
02	Jesse Little	Young's Motorsports	Chevrolet
3	Jordan Anderson	Jordan Anderson Racing	Chevrolet
4	John Hunter Nemechek	Kyle Busch Motorsports	Toyota
5	Tyler Hill	Hill Motorsports	Toyota
7	Rajah Caruth	Spire Motorsports	Chevrolet
9	Blaine Perkins (R)	CR7 Motorsports	Chevrolet
12	Spencer Boyd	Young's Motorsports	Chevrolet
13	Johnny Sauter	ThorSport Racing	Toyota
15	Tanner Gray	David Gilliland Racing	Ford
16	Tyler Ankrum	Hattori Racing Enterprises	Toyota
17	Taylor Gray	David Gilliland Racing	Ford
18	Chandler Smith	Kyle Busch Motorsports	Toyota
19	Derek Kraus	McAnally–Hilgemann Racing	Chevrolet
20	Matt Mills (i)	Young's Motorsports	Chevrolet
22	Austin Wayne Self	AM Racing	Chevrolet
23	Grant Enfinger	GMS Racing	Chevrolet
24	Jack Wood (R)	GMS Racing	Chevrolet
25	Matt DiBenedetto	Rackley W.A.R.	Chevrolet
30	Tate Fogleman	On Point Motorsports	Toyota
33	Mason Maggio	Reaume Brothers Racing	Chevrolet
35	Jake Garcia	McAnally–Hilgemann Racing	Chevrolet
38	Zane Smith	Front Row Motorsports	Ford
40	Dean Thompson (R)	Niece Motorsports	Chevrolet
42	Carson Hocevar	Niece Motorsports	Chevrolet
43	Blake Lothian	Reaume Brothers Racing	Toyota
44	Kris Wright	Niece Motorsports	Chevrolet
45	Lawless Alan (R)	Niece Motorsports	Chevrolet
46	Brennan Poole	G2G Racing	Toyota
51	Corey Heim	Kyle Busch Motorsports	Toyota
52	Stewart Friesen	Halmar Friesen Racing	Toyota
56	Timmy Hill	Hill Motorsports	Toyota
61	Chase Purdy	Hattori Racing Enterprises	Toyota
66	Ty Majeski	ThorSport Racing	Toyota
88	Matt Crafton	ThorSport Racing	Toyota
90	Justin Carroll	TC Motorsports	Toyota
91	Colby Howard	McAnally–Hilgemann Racing	Chevrolet
98	Christian Eckes	ThorSport Racing	Toyota
99	Ben Rhodes	ThorSport Racing	Toyota
Official entry list

== Practice ==
The only 30-minute practice session was held on Friday, June 3, at 5:00 PM CST. Ty Majeski of ThorSport Racing was the fastest in the session, with a time of 33.312 seconds, and a speed of 135.086 mph (217.400 km/h).

Pos.	#	Driver	Team	Make	Time	Speed
1	66	Ty Majeski	ThorSport Racing	Toyota	33.312	135.086
2	98	Christian Eckes	ThorSport Racing	Toyota	33.325	135.034
3	23	Grant Enfinger	GMS Racing	Chevrolet	33.342	134.965
Full practice results

== Qualifying ==
Qualifying was held on Friday, June 3, at 5:30 PM CST. Since World Wide Technology Raceway is an oval track, the qualifying system used is a single-car, one-lap system with only one round. Whoever sets the fastest time in the round wins the pole.

Corey Heim of Kyle Busch Motorsports scored the pole for the race, with a time of 32.554 seconds, and a speed of 138.232 mph (222.463 km/h).

Pos.	#	Driver	Team	Make	Time	Speed
1	51	Corey Heim (R)	Kyle Busch Motorsports	Toyota	32.554	138.232
2	38	Zane Smith	Front Row Motorsports	Ford	32.614	137.978
3	52	Stewart Friesen	Halmar Friesen Racing	Toyota	32.641	137.863
4	18	Chandler Smith	Kyle Busch Motorsports	Toyota	32.663	137.771
5	98	Christian Eckes	ThorSport Racing	Toyota	32.664	137.766
6	4	John Hunter Nemechek	Kyle Busch Motorsports	Toyota	32.674	137.724
7	91	Colby Howard	McAnally–Hilgemann Racing	Chevrolet	32.690	137.657
8	66	Ty Majeski	ThorSport Racing	Toyota	32.707	137.585
9	17	Taylor Gray	David Gilliland Racing	Ford	32.719	137.535
10	23	Grant Enfinger	GMS Racing	Chevrolet	32.756	137.379
11	88	Matt Crafton	ThorSport Racing	Toyota	32.775	137.300
12	42	Carson Hocevar	Niece Motorsports	Chevrolet	32.931	136.649
13	61	Chase Purdy	Hattori Racing Enterprises	Toyota	33.057	136.129
14	15	Tanner Gray	David Gilliland Racing	Ford	33.065	136.096
15	99	Ben Rhodes	ThorSport Racing	Toyota	33.094	135.976
16	25	Matt DiBenedetto	Rackley W.A.R.	Chevrolet	33.094	135.976
17	44	Kris Wright	Niece Motorsports	Chevrolet	33.206	135.518
18	13	Johnny Sauter	ThorSport Racing	Toyota	33.281	135.212
19	7	Rajah Caruth	Spire Motorsports	Chevrolet	33.284	135.200
20	16	Tyler Ankrum	Hattori Racing Enterprises	Toyota	33.440	134.569
21	35	Jake Garcia	McAnally–Hilgemann Racing	Chevrolet	33.446	134.545
22	02	Jesse Little	Young's Motorsports	Chevrolet	33.473	134.437
23	9	Blaine Perkins (R)	CR7 Motorsports	Chevrolet	33.532	134.200
24	45	Lawless Alan (R)	Niece Motorsports	Chevrolet	33.539	134.172
25	40	Dean Thompson (R)	Niece Motorsports	Chevrolet	33.556	134.104
26	1	Hailie Deegan	David Gilliland Racing	Ford	33.574	134.032
27	5	Tyler Hill	Hill Motorsports	Toyota	33.634	133.793
28	22	Austin Wayne Self	AM Racing	Chevrolet	33.640	133.769
29	56	Timmy Hill	Hill Motorsports	Toyota	33.704	133.515
30	3	Jordan Anderson	Jordan Anderson Racing	Chevrolet	33.738	133.381
31	46	Brennan Poole	G2G Racing	Toyota	33.979	132.435
Qualified by owner's points
32	24	Jack Wood (R)	GMS Racing	Chevrolet	34.127	131.860
33	33	Mason Maggio	Reaume Brothers Racing	Chevrolet	34.163	131.721
34	12	Spencer Boyd	Young's Motorsports	Chevrolet	34.346	131.020
35	30	Tate Fogleman	On Point Motorsports	Toyota	34.633	129.934
36	19	Derek Kraus	McAnally–Hilgemann Racing	Chevrolet	-	-
Failed to qualify
37	20	Matt Mills (i)	Young's Motorsports	Chevrolet	34.477	130.522
38	90	Justin Carroll	TC Motorsports	Toyota	34.683	129.747
39	43	Blake Lothian	Reaume Brothers Racing	Toyota	34.757	129.470
Official qualifying results
Official starting lineup

== Race results ==
Stage 1 Laps: 55

Pos.	#	Driver	Team	Make	Pts
1	18	Chandler Smith	Kyle Busch Motorsports	Toyota	10
2	51	Corey Heim (R)	Kyle Busch Motorsports	Toyota	9
3	4	John Hunter Nemechek	Kyle Busch Motorsports	Toyota	8
4	38	Zane Smith	Front Row Motorsports	Ford	7
5	52	Stewart Friesen	Halmar Friesen Racing	Toyota	6
6	66	Ty Majeski	ThorSport Racing	Toyota	5
7	23	Grant Enfinger	GMS Racing	Chevrolet	4
8	98	Christian Eckes	ThorSport Racing	Toyota	3
9	88	Matt Crafton	ThorSport Racing	Toyota	2
10	91	Colby Howard	McAnally–Hilgemann Racing	Chevrolet	1

Stage 2 Laps: 55

Pos.	#	Driver	Team	Make	Pts
1	99	Ben Rhodes	ThorSport Racing	Toyota	10
2	88	Matt Crafton	ThorSport Racing	Toyota	9
3	19	Derek Kraus	McAnally–Hilgemann Racing	Chevrolet	8
4	61	Chase Purdy	Hattori Racing Enterprises	Toyota	7
5	22	Austin Wayne Self	AM Racing	Chevrolet	6
6	42	Carson Hocevar	Niece Motorsports	Chevrolet	5
7	1	Hailie Deegan	David Gilliland Racing	Ford	4
8	51	Corey Heim (R)	Kyle Busch Motorsports	Toyota	3
9	52	Stewart Friesen	Halmar Friesen Racing	Toyota	2
10	38	Zane Smith	Front Row Motorsports	Ford	1

Stage 3 Laps: 55

Fin.	St	#	Driver	Team	Make	Laps	Led	Status	Points
1	1	51	Corey Heim (R)	Kyle Busch Motorsports	Toyota	165	20	Running	52
2	5	98	Christian Eckes	ThorSport Racing	Toyota	165	9	Running	38
3	4	18	Chandler Smith	Kyle Busch Motorsports	Toyota	165	40	Running	44
4	3	52	Stewart Friesen	Halmar Friesen Racing	Toyota	165	13	Running	41
5	18	13	Johnny Sauter	ThorSport Racing	Toyota	165	0	Running	32
6	16	25	Matt DiBenedetto	Rackley W.A.R.	Chevrolet	165	0	Running	31
7	36	19	Derek Kraus	McAnally–Hilgemann Racing	Chevrolet	165	12	Running	38
8	15	99	Ben Rhodes	ThorSport Racing	Toyota	165	43	Running	39
9	2	38	Zane Smith	Front Row Motorsports	Ford	165	16	Running	36
10	13	61	Chase Purdy	Hattori Racing Enterprises	Toyota	165	0	Running	34
11	19	7	Rajah Caruth	Spire Motorsports	Chevrolet	165	0	Running	26
12	11	88	Matt Crafton	ThorSport Racing	Toyota	165	0	Running	36
13	20	16	Tyler Ankrum	Hattori Racing Enterprises	Toyota	165	0	Running	24
14	25	40	Dean Thompson (R)	Niece Motorsports	Chevrolet	165	0	Running	23
15	26	1	Hailie Deegan	David Gilliland Racing	Ford	165	0	Running	26
16	30	3	Jordan Anderson	Jordan Anderson Racing	Chevrolet	165	0	Running	21
17	29	56	Timmy Hill	Hill Motorsports	Toyota	165	0	Running	20
18	24	45	Lawless Alan (R)	Niece Motorsports	Chevrolet	165	0	Running	19
19	32	24	Jack Wood (R)	GMS Racing	Chevrolet	165	0	Running	18
20	22	02	Jesse Little	Young's Motorsports	Chevrolet	165	0	Running	17
21	35	30	Tate Fogleman	On Point Motorsports	Toyota	165	0	Running	16
22	23	9	Blaine Perkins (R)	CR7 Motorsports	Chevrolet	165	0	Running	15
23	7	91	Colby Howard	McAnally–Hilgemann Racing	Chevrolet	165	0	Running	15
24	12	42	Carson Hocevar	Niece Motorsports	Chevrolet	164	8	Accident	18
25	27	5	Tyler Hill	Hill Motorsports	Toyota	164	0	Accident	12
26	28	22	Austin Wayne Self	AM Racing	Chevrolet	164	0	Accident	17
27	33	33	Mason Maggio	Reaume Brothers Racing	Chevrolet	164	0	Running	10
28	10	23	Grant Enfinger	GMS Racing	Chevrolet	163	4	Running	13
29	21	35	Jake Garcia	McAnally–Hilgemann Racing	Chevrolet	161	0	Running	8
30	14	15	Tanner Gray	David Gilliland Racing	Ford	156	0	Accident	7
31	34	12	Spencer Boyd	Young's Motorsports	Chevrolet	151	0	Electrical	6
32	8	66	Ty Majeski	ThorSport Racing	Toyota	136	0	Running	10
33	17	44	Kris Wright	Niece Motorsports	Chevrolet	93	0	Accident	4
34	31	46	Brennan Poole	G2G Racing	Toyota	77	0	Rear Gear	3
35	6	4	John Hunter Nemechek	Kyle Busch Motorsports	Toyota	57	0	DVP	10
36	9	17	Taylor Gray	David Gilliland Racing	Ford	45	0	Accident	1
Official race results

== Standings after the race ==
Drivers' Championship standings

Pos	Driver	Points
1	Ben Rhodes	415
2	Chandler Smith	398 (-17)
3	Zane Smith	394 (-21)
4	John Hunter Nemechek	393 (-22)
5	Stewart Friesen	311 (-32)
6	Christian Eckes	381 (-34)
7	Ty Majeski	355 (-60)
8	Carson Hocevar	337 (-78)
9	Matt Crafton	317 (-98)
10	Grant Enfinger	311 (-104)
Official driver's standings

- Note: Only the first 10 positions are included for the driver standings.

Previous race: 2022 North Carolina Education Lottery 200	NASCAR Camping World Truck Series; 2022 season	Next race: 2022 DoorDash 250
