= 2022 Fr8 208 =

Third race of the 2022 NASCAR Camping World Truck Series

Race details
- Race 3 of 23 of the 2022 NASCAR Camping World Truck Series
- Date: March 19, 2022
- Official name: 17th Annual Fr8 208
- Location: Hampton, Georgia, Atlanta Motor Speedway
- Course: Permanent racing facility
- Course length: 1.54 miles (2.48 km)
- Distance: 135 laps, 207.9 mi (334.6 km)
- Scheduled distance: 135 laps, 207.9 mi (334.6 km)
- Average speed: 109.182 mph (175.711 km/h)

Pole position
Driver	Chandler Smith	Kyle Busch Motorsports
- Time: Set by NASCAR rulebook

Most laps led
Driver	Stewart Friesen	Halmar Friesen Racing
- Laps: 49

Winner
No. 51	Corey Heim	Kyle Busch Motorsports

Television in the United States
- Network: Fox Sports 1
- Announcers: Vince Welch, Phil Parsons, Michael Waltrip

Radio in the United States
- Radio: Motor Racing Network

The 2022 Fr8 208 was the third stock car race of the 2022 NASCAR Camping World Truck Series and the 17th iteration of the event. The race was held on Saturday, March 19, 2022, in Hampton, Georgia at Atlanta Motor Speedway, a 1.54 miles (2.48 km) permanent quad-oval racetrack. The race was run over 135 laps. Corey Heim of Kyle Busch Motorsports would win the race after getting a push to the lead by teammate John Hunter Nemechek on the last lap. This was Heim's first career win in the truck series. To fill out the podium, Ben Rhodes and Ty Majeski of ThorSport Racing would finish 2nd and 3rd, respectively.

== Background ==
Atlanta Motor Speedway (formerly Atlanta International Raceway) is a 1.54-mile race track in Hampton, Georgia, United States, 20 miles (32 km) south of Atlanta. It has annually hosted NASCAR Cup Series stock car races since its inauguration in 1960.

The venue was bought by Speedway Motorsports in 1990. In 1994, 46 condominiums were built over the northeastern side of the track. In 1997, to standardize the track with Speedway Motorsports' other two intermediate ovals, the entire track was almost completely rebuilt. The frontstretch and backstretch were swapped, and the configuration of the track was changed from oval to quad-oval, with a new official length of 1.54-mile (2.48 km) where before it was 1.522-mile (2.449 km). The project made the track one of the fastest on the NASCAR circuit. In July 2021 NASCAR announced that the track would be reprofiled for the 2022 season to have 28 degrees of banking and would be narrowed from 55 to 40 feet which the track claims will turn racing at the track similar to restrictor plate superspeedways. Despite the reprofiling being criticized by drivers, construction began in August 2021 and wrapped up in December 2021. The track has seating capacity of 71,000 to 125,000 people depending on the tracks configuration.

=== Entry list ===
#	Driver	Team	Make
1	Hailie Deegan	David Gilliland Racing	Ford
02	Jesse Little	Young's Motorsports	Chevrolet
3	Jordan Anderson	Jordan Anderson Racing	Chevrolet
4	John Hunter Nemechek	Kyle Busch Motorsports	Toyota
9	Blaine Perkins (R)	CR7 Motorsports	Chevrolet
12	Spencer Boyd	Young's Motorsports	Chevrolet
15	Tanner Gray	David Gilliland Racing	Ford
16	Tyler Ankrum	Hattori Racing Enterprises	Toyota
17	Ryan Preece	David Gilliland Racing	Ford
18	Chandler Smith	Kyle Busch Motorsports	Toyota
19	Derek Kraus	McAnally-Hilgemann Racing	Chevrolet
20	Matt Mills (i)	Young's Motorsports	Chevrolet
22	Austin Wayne Self	AM Racing	Chevrolet
23	Grant Enfinger	GMS Racing	Chevrolet
24	Jack Wood (R)	GMS Racing	Chevrolet
25	Matt DiBenedetto	Rackley WAR	Chevrolet
30	Tate Fogleman	On Point Motorsports	Toyota
33	Chris Hacker	Reaume Brothers Racing	Toyota
38	Zane Smith	Front Row Motorsports	Ford
40	Dean Thompson (R)	Niece Motorsports	Chevrolet
41	Ross Chastain (i)	Niece Motorsports	Chevrolet
42	Carson Hocevar	Niece Motorsports	Chevrolet
43	Thad Moffitt	Reaume Brothers Racing	Chevrolet
44	Kris Wright	Niece Motorsports	Chevrolet
45	Lawless Alan (R)	Niece Motorsports	Chevrolet
46	Matt Jaskol	G2G Racing	Toyota
47	Brennan Poole (i)	G2G Racing	Toyota
51	Corey Heim (R)	Kyle Busch Motorsports	Toyota
52	Stewart Friesen	Halmar Friesen Racing	Toyota
56	Timmy Hill	Hill Motorsports	Toyota
61	Chase Purdy	Hattori Racing Enterprises	Toyota
66	Ty Majeski	ThorSport Racing	Toyota
88	Matt Crafton	ThorSport Racing	Toyota
91	Colby Howard	McAnally-Hilgemann Racing	Chevrolet
98	Christian Eckes	ThorSport Racing	Toyota
99	Ben Rhodes	ThorSport Racing	Toyota
Official entry list

== Practice ==
Friday's 50-minute practice session was cancelled due to inclement weather. Practice will replace qualifying on Saturday. Tyler Ankrum of Hattori Racing Enterprises would set the fastest time in the session, with a time of 30.527 seconds and a speed of 181.610 mph (292.273 km/h).

Pos.	#	Driver	Team	Make	Time	Speed
1	16	Tyler Ankrum	Hattori Racing Enterprises	Toyota	30.537	181.610
2	25	Matt DiBenedetto	Rackley WAR	Chevrolet	30.581	181.289
3	19	Derek Kraus	McAnally-Hilgemann Racing	Chevrolet	30.599	181.182
Full practice results

== Qualifying ==
Qualifying will be cancelled because of a need to add additional practice to the reconfigured circuit. Starting lineup will be based on the rulebook. No one would fail to qualify for the race. Chandler Smith would get the pole for the race.

Pos.	#	Driver	Team	Make	Time	Speed
1	18	Chandler Smith	Kyle Busch Motorsports	Toyota	—	—
2	52	Stewart Friesen	Halmar Friesen Racing	Toyota	—	—
3	88	Matt Crafton	ThorSport Racing	Toyota	—	—
4	66	Ty Majeski	ThorSport Racing	Toyota	—	—
5	42	Carson Hocevar	Niece Motorsports	Chevrolet	—	—
6	25	Matt DiBenedetto	Rackley WAR	Chevrolet	—	—
7	22	Austin Wayne Self	AM Racing	Chevrolet	—	—
8	23	Grant Enfinger	GMS Racing	Chevrolet	—	—
9	15	Tanner Gray	David Gilliland Racing	Ford	—	—
10	16	Tyler Ankrum	Hattori Racing Enterprises	Toyota	—	—
11	17	Ryan Preece	David Gilliland Racing	Ford	—	—
12	4	John Hunter Nemechek	Kyle Busch Motorsports	Toyota	—	—
13	40	Dean Thompson (R)	Niece Motorsports	Chevrolet	—	—
14	20	Matt Mills (i)	Young's Motorsports	Chevrolet	—	—
15	99	Ben Rhodes	ThorSport Racing	Toyota	—	—
16	98	Christian Eckes	ThorSport Racing	Toyota	—	—
17	30	Tate Fogleman	On Point Motorsports	Toyota	—	—
18	19	Derek Kraus	McAnally-Hilgemann Racing	Chevrolet	—	—
19	51	Corey Heim (R)	Kyle Busch Motorsports	Toyota	—	—
20	61	Chase Purdy	Hattori Racing Enterprises	Toyota	—	—
21	44	Kris Wright	Niece Motorsports	Chevrolet	—	—
22	24	Jack Wood (R)	GMS Racing	Chevrolet	—	—
23	56	Timmy Hill	Hill Motorsports	Toyota	—	—
24	45	Lawless Alan (R)	Niece Motorsports	Chevrolet	—	—
25	38	Zane Smith	Front Row Motorsports	Ford	—	—
26	91	Colby Howard	McAnally-Hilgemann Racing	Chevrolet	—	—
27	1	Hailie Deegan	David Gilliland Racing	Ford	—	—
28	43	Thad Moffitt	Reaume Brothers Racing	Chevrolet	—	—
29	33	Chris Hacker	Reaume Brothers Racing	Toyota	—	—
30	12	Spencer Boyd	Young's Motorsports	Chevrolet	—	—
31	46	Matt Jaskol	G2G Racing	Toyota	—	—
32	9	Blaine Perkins (R)	CR7 Motorsports	Chevrolet	—	—
33	3	Jordan Anderson	Jordan Anderson Racing	Chevrolet	—	—
34	02	Jesse Little	Young's Motorsports	Chevrolet	—	—
35	47	Brennan Poole (i)	G2G Racing	Toyota	—	—
36	41	Ross Chastain (i)	Niece Motorsports	Chevrolet	—	—
Official starting lineup

== Race results ==
Stage 1 Laps: 30

Pos.	#	Driver	Team	Make	Pts
1	52	Stewart Friesen	Halmar Friesen Racing	Toyota	10
2	23	Grant Enfinger	GMS Racing	Chevrolet	9
3	19	Derek Kraus	McAnally–Hilgemann Racing	Chevrolet	8
4	98	Christian Eckes	ThorSport Racing	Toyota	7
5	88	Matt Crafton	ThorSport Racing	Toyota	6
6	15	Tanner Gray	David Gilliland Racing	Ford	5
7	18	Chandler Smith	Kyle Busch Motorsports	Toyota	4
8	41	Ross Chastain (i)	Niece Motorsports	Chevrolet	0
9	4	John Hunter Nemechek	Kyle Busch Motorsports	Toyota	2
10	16	Tyler Ankrum	Hattori Racing Enterprises	Toyota	1

Stage 2 Laps: 30

Pos.	#	Driver	Team	Make	Pts
1	4	John Hunter Nemechek	Kyle Busch Motorsports	Toyota	10
2	66	Ty Majeski	ThorSport Racing	Toyota	9
3	18	Chandler Smith	Kyle Busch Motorsports	Toyota	8
4	98	Christian Eckes	ThorSport Racing	Toyota	7
5	16	Tyler Ankrum	Hattori Racing Enterprises	Toyota	6
6	88	Matt Crafton	ThorSport Racing	Toyota	5
7	40	Dean Thompson (R)	Niece Motorsports	Chevrolet	4
8	15	Tanner Gray	David Gilliland Racing	Ford	3
9	42	Carson Hocevar	Niece Motorsports	Chevrolet	2
10	17	Ryan Preece	David Gilliland Racing	Ford	1

Stage 3 Laps: 75

Fin.	St	#	Driver	Team	Make	Laps	Led	Status	Points
1	19	51	Corey Heim (R)	Kyle Busch Motorsports	Toyota	135	22	Running	40
2	15	99	Ben Rhodes	ThorSport Racing	Toyota	135	9	Running	35
3	4	66	Ty Majeski	ThorSport Racing	Toyota	135	1	Running	43
4	1	18	Chandler Smith	Kyle Busch Motorsports	Toyota	135	21	Running	45
5	25	38	Zane Smith	Front Row Motorsports	Ford	135	0	Running	32
6	2	52	Stewart Friesen	Halmar Friesen Racing	Toyota	135	49	Running	41
7	11	17	Ryan Preece	David Gilliland Racing	Ford	135	4	Running	31
8	9	15	Tanner Gray	David Gilliland Racing	Ford	135	0	Running	37
9	18	19	Derek Kraus	McAnally-Hilgemann Racing	Chevrolet	135	0	Running	36
10	7	22	Austin Wayne Self	AM Racing	Chevrolet	135	0	Running	27
11	10	16	Tyler Ankrum	Hattori Racing Enterprises	Toyota	135	0	Running	33
12	8	23	Grant Enfinger	GMS Racing	Chevrolet	135	14	Running	34
13	22	24	Jack Wood (R)	GMS Racing	Chevrolet	135	0	Running	24
14	20	61	Chase Purdy	Hattori Racing Enterprises	Toyota	135	0	Running	23
15	34	02	Jesse Little	Young's Motorsports	Chevrolet	135	0	Running	22
16	16	98	Christian Eckes	ThorSport Racing	Toyota	135	3	Running	35
17	29	33	Chris Hacker	Reaume Brothers Racing	Toyota	135	0	Running	20
18	33	3	Jordan Anderson	Jordan Anderson Racing	Chevrolet	135	0	Running	19
19	31	46	Matt Jaskol	G2G Racing	Toyota	135	0	Running	18
20	30	12	Spencer Boyd	Young's Motorsports	Chevrolet	134	0	Running	17
21	21	44	Kris Wright	Niece Motorsports	Chevrolet	134	0	Running	16
22	23	56	Timmy Hill	Hill Motorsports	Toyota	134	0	Running	15
23	36	41	Ross Chastain (i)	Niece Motorsports	Chevrolet	133	0	Tire	0
24	12	4	John Hunter Nemechek	Kyle Busch Motorsports	Toyota	133	11	Running	25
25	3	88	Matt Crafton	ThorSport Racing	Toyota	133	1	Running	23
26	26	91	Colby Howard	McAnally-Hilgemann Racing	Chevrolet	133	0	Running	11
27	5	42	Carson Hocevar	Niece Motorsports	Chevrolet	132	0	Running	12
28	35	47	Brennan Poole (i)	G2G Racing	Toyota	130	0	Running	0
29	32	9	Blaine Perkins (R)	CR7 Motorsports	Chevrolet	126	0	Running	8
30	6	25	Matt DiBenedetto	Rackley WAR	Chevrolet	123	0	Running	7
31	17	30	Tate Fogleman	On Point Motorsports	Toyota	91	0	Accident	6
32	28	43	Thad Moffitt	Reaume Brothers Racing	Chevrolet	79	0	Engine	5
33	24	45	Lawless Alan (R)	Niece Motorsports	Chevrolet	75	0	Accident	4
34	13	40	Dean Thompson (R)	Niece Motorsports	Chevrolet	68	0	Accident	7
35	14	20	Matt Mills (i)	Young's Motorsports	Chevrolet	52	0	Suspension	0
36	27	1	Hailie Deegan	David Gilliland Racing	Ford	24	0	Tire	1
Official race results

== Standings after the race ==
Drivers' Championship standings

Pos	Driver	Points
1	Chandler Smith	132
2	Tanner Gray	119 (-13)
3	Ty Majeski	115 (-17)
4	Stewart Friesen	106 (-26)
5	Ben Rhodes	105 (-27)
6	Christian Eckes	88 (-44)
7	Austin Wayne Self	84 (-48)
8	John Hunter Nemechek	80 (-52)
9	Zane Smith	79 (-53)
10	Matt Crafton	78 (-54)
Official driver's standings

- Note: Only the first 10 positions are included for the driver standings.

Previous race: 2022 Victoria's Voice Foundation 200	NASCAR Camping World Truck Series; 2022 season	Next race: 2022 XPEL 225
