= 2022 SpeedyCash.com 220 =

Ninth race of the 2022 NASCAR Camping World Truck Series

Race details
- Race 9 of 23 of the 2022 NASCAR Camping World Truck Series
- Date: May 20, 2022
- Official name: 26th Annual SpeedyCash.com 220
- Location: Fort Worth, Texas, Texas Motor Speedway
- Course: Permanent racing facility
- Course length: 1.5 miles (2.4 km)
- Distance: 149 laps, 223.5 mi (359.6 km)
- Scheduled distance: 147 laps, 220.5 mi (354.9 km)
- Average speed: 116.775 mph (187.931 km/h)

Pole position
Driver	John Hunter Nemechek	Kyle Busch Motorsports
- Time: 29.612

Most laps led
Driver	Stewart Friesen	Halmar Friesen Racing
- Laps: 60

Winner
No. 52	Stewart Friesen	Halmar Friesen Racing

Television in the United States
- Network: Fox Sports 1
- Announcers: Vince Welch, Phil Parsons, Michael Waltrip

Radio in the United States
- Radio: Motor Racing Network

The 2022 SpeedyCash.com 220 was the ninth stock car race of the 2022 NASCAR Camping World Truck Series and the 26th iteration of the event. The race was held on Friday, May 20, 2022, in Fort Worth, Texas at Texas Motor Speedway, a 1.5 miles (2.4 km) permanent quad-oval racetrack. The race was extended from 147 laps to 149 laps, due to an overtime finish. In an exciting final restart, Stewart Friesen, driving for his team, Halmar Friesen Racing, took advantage of the lead over Christian Eckes on the final lap, and earned his third career NASCAR Camping World Truck Series win. It was his first win of the season, and his first win since the 2019 Lucas Oil 150. To fill out the podium, Ryan Preece of David Gilliland Racing would finish third, respectively.

== Background ==
Texas Motor Speedway is a speedway located in the northernmost portion of the U.S. city of Fort Worth, Texas – the portion located in Denton County, Texas. The reconfigured track measures 1.44 miles (2.32 km) with banked 20° in turns 1 and 2 and banked 24° in turns 3 and 4. Texas Motor Speedway is a quad-oval design, where the front straightaway juts outward slightly. The track layout is similar to Atlanta Motor Speedway and Charlotte Motor Speedway. The track is owned by Speedway Motorsports, Inc.

=== Entry list ===
- (R) denotes rookie driver.
- (i) denotes driver who are ineligible for series driver points.

#	Driver	Team	Make
1	Hailie Deegan	David Gilliland Racing	Ford
02	Jesse Little	Young's Motorsports	Chevrolet
3	Jordan Anderson	Jordan Anderson Racing	Chevrolet
4	John Hunter Nemechek	Kyle Busch Motorsports	Toyota
5	Tyler Hill	Hill Motorsports	Toyota
9	Blaine Perkins (R)	CR7 Motorsports	Chevrolet
12	Spencer Boyd	Young's Motorsports	Chevrolet
15	Tanner Gray	David Gilliland Racing	Ford
16	Tyler Ankrum	Hattori Racing Enterprises	Toyota
17	Ryan Preece	David Gilliland Racing	Ford
18	Chandler Smith	Kyle Busch Motorsports	Toyota
19	Derek Kraus	McAnally–Hilgemann Racing	Chevrolet
20	Garrett Smithley (i)	Young's Motorsports	Chevrolet
22	Austin Wayne Self	AM Racing	Chevrolet
23	Grant Enfinger	GMS Racing	Chevrolet
24	Jack Wood (R)	GMS Racing	Chevrolet
25	Matt DiBenedetto	Rackley W.A.R.	Chevrolet
30	Tate Fogleman	On Point Motorsports	Toyota
32	Bret Holmes	Bret Holmes Racing	Chevrolet
33	Chris Hacker	Reaume Brothers Racing	Chevrolet
38	Zane Smith	Front Row Motorsports	Ford
40	Dean Thompson (R)	Niece Motorsports	Chevrolet
41	Ross Chastain (i)	Niece Motorsports	Chevrolet
42	Carson Hocevar	Niece Motorsports	Chevrolet
43	Armani Williams	Reaume Brothers Racing	Toyota
44	Kris Wright	Niece Motorsports	Chevrolet
45	Lawless Alan (R)	Niece Motorsports	Chevrolet
46	Brennan Poole (i)	G2G Racing	Toyota
51	Corey Heim (R)	Kyle Busch Motorsports	Toyota
52	Stewart Friesen	Halmar Friesen Racing	Toyota
56	Timmy Hill	Hill Motorsports	Toyota
61	Chase Purdy	Hattori Racing Enterprises	Toyota
62	Todd Bodine	Halmar Friesen Racing	Toyota
66	Ty Majeski	ThorSport Racing	Toyota
88	Matt Crafton	ThorSport Racing	Toyota
91	Colby Howard	McAnally–Hilgemann Racing	Chevrolet
98	Christian Eckes	ThorSport Racing	Toyota
99	Ben Rhodes	ThorSport Racing	Toyota
Official entry list

== Practice ==
The only 30-minute practice session was held on Friday, May 20, at 3:00 PM CST. Ty Majeski of ThorSport Racing was the fastest in the session, with a time of 30.269 seconds and a speed of 178.400 mph (287.107 km/h).

Pos.	#	Driver	Team	Make	Time	Speed
1	66	Ty Majeski	ThorSport Racing	Toyota	30.269	178.400
2	38	Zane Smith	Front Row Motorsports	Ford	30.293	178.259
3	52	Stewart Friesen	Halmar Friesen Racing	Toyota	30.384	177.725
Full practice results

== Qualifying ==
Qualifying was held on Friday, May 20, at 3:30 PM CST. Since Texas Motor Speedway is an oval track, the qualifying system used is a single-car, one-lap system with only one round. Whoever sets the fastest time in the round wins the pole.

John Hunter Nemechek of Kyle Busch Motorsports scored the pole for the race, with a time of 29.612 seconds, and a speed of 182.359 mph (293.478 km/h).

Pos.	#	Driver	Team	Make	Time	Speed
1	4	John Hunter Nemechek	Kyle Busch Motorsports	Toyota	29.612	182.359
2	51	Corey Heim (R)	Kyle Busch Motorsports	Toyota	29.639	182.192
3	52	Stewart Friesen	Halmar Friesen Racing	Toyota	29.825	181.056
4	98	Christian Eckes	ThorSport Racing	Toyota	29.899	180.608
5	17	Ryan Preece	David Gilliland Racing	Ford	29.902	180.590
6	1	Hailie Deegan	David Gilliland Racing	Ford	29.923	180.463
7	18	Chandler Smith	Kyle Busch Motorsports	Toyota	29.980	180.120
8	99	Ben Rhodes	ThorSport Racing	Toyota	30.000	180.000
9	19	Derek Kraus	McAnally–Hilgemann Racing	Chevrolet	30.024	179.856
10	66	Ty Majeski	ThorSport Racing	Toyota	30.053	179.683
11	23	Grant Enfinger	GMS Racing	Chevrolet	30.100	179.402
12	15	Tanner Gray	David Gilliland Racing	Ford	30.138	179.176
13	40	Dean Thompson (R)	Niece Motorsports	Chevrolet	30.161	179.039
14	41	Ross Chastain (i)	Niece Motorsports	Chevrolet	30.163	179.027
15	38	Zane Smith	Front Row Motorsports	Ford	30.236	178.595
16	44	Kris Wright	Niece Motorsports	Chevrolet	30.270	178.394
17	24	Jack Wood (R)	GMS Racing	Chevrolet	30.270	178.394
18	16	Tyler Ankrum	Hattori Racing Enterprises	Toyota	30.292	178.265
19	61	Chase Purdy	Hattori Racing Enterprises	Toyota	30.305	178.188
20	42	Carson Hocevar	Niece Motorsports	Chevrolet	30.308	178.171
21	88	Matt Crafton	ThorSport Racing	Toyota	30.339	177.989
22	02	Jesse Little	Young's Motorsports	Chevrolet	30.410	177.573
23	22	Austin Wayne Self	AM Racing	Chevrolet	30.548	176.771
24	62	Todd Bodine	Halmar Friesen Racing	Toyota	30.610	176.413
25	9	Blaine Perkins (R)	CR7 Motorsports	Chevrolet	30.654	176.160
26	46	Brennan Poole (i)	G2G Racing	Toyota	30.662	176.114
27	3	Jordan Anderson	Jordan Anderson Racing	Chevrolet	30.669	176.074
28	12	Spencer Boyd	Young's Motorsports	Chevrolet	30.745	175.638
29	30	Tate Fogleman	On Point Motorsports	Toyota	30.748	175.621
30	5	Tyler Hill	Hill Motorsports	Toyota	30.812	175.256
31	32	Bret Holmes	Bret Holmes Racing	Chevrolet	30.832	175.143
Qualified by owner's points
32	56	Timmy Hill	Hill Motorsports	Toyota	31.277	172.651
33	91	Colby Howard	McAnally–Hilgemann Racing	Chevrolet	-	-
34	25	Matt DiBenedetto	Rackley W.A.R.	Chevrolet	-	-
35	45	Lawless Alan (R)	Niece Motorsports	Chevrolet	-	-
36	33	Chris Hacker	Reaume Brothers Racing	Chevrolet	-	-
Failed to qualify
37	20	Garrett Smithley (i)	Young's Motorsports	Chevrolet	30.926	174.554
38	43	Armani Williams	Reaume Brothers Racing	Toyota	-	-
Official qualifying results
Official starting lineup

== Race results ==
Stage 1 Laps: 35

Pos.	#	Driver	Team	Make	Pts
1	17	Ryan Preece	David Gilliland Racing	Ford	10
2	52	Stewart Friesen	Halmar Friesen Racing	Toyota	9
3	38	Zane Smith	Front Row Motorsports	Ford	8
4	98	Christian Eckes	ThorSport Racing	Toyota	7
5	18	Chandler Smith	Kyle Busch Motorsports	Toyota	6
6	4	John Hunter Nemechek	Kyle Busch Motorsports	Toyota	5
7	66	Ty Majeski	ThorSport Racing	Toyota	4
8	99	Ben Rhodes	ThorSport Racing	Toyota	3
9	19	Derek Kraus	McAnally–Hilgemann Racing	Chevrolet	2
10	51	Corey Heim (R)	Kyle Busch Motorsports	Toyota	1

Stage 2 Laps: 35

Pos.	#	Driver	Team	Make	Pts
1	17	Ryan Preece	David Gilliland Racing	Ford	10
2	52	Stewart Friesen	Halmar Friesen Racing	Toyota	9
3	4	John Hunter Nemechek	Kyle Busch Motorsports	Toyota	8
4	99	Ben Rhodes	ThorSport Racing	Toyota	7
5	98	Christian Eckes	ThorSport Racing	Toyota	6
6	19	Derek Kraus	McAnally–Hilgemann Racing	Chevrolet	5
7	51	Corey Heim (R)	Kyle Busch Motorsports	Toyota	4
8	66	Ty Majeski	ThorSport Racing	Toyota	3
9	41	Ross Chastain (i)	Niece Motorsports	Chevrolet	0
10	16	Tyler Ankrum	Hattori Racing Enterprises	Toyota	1

Stage 3 Laps: 79

Fin.	St	#	Driver	Team	Make	Laps	Led	Status	Points
1	3	52	Stewart Friesen	Halmar Friesen Racing	Toyota	149	60	Running	58
2	4	98	Christian Eckes	ThorSport Racing	Toyota	149	40	Running	48
3	5	17	Ryan Preece	David Gilliland Racing	Ford	149	27	Running	54
4	20	42	Carson Hocevar	Niece Motorsports	Chevrolet	149	4	Running	33
5	10	66	Ty Majeski	ThorSport Racing	Toyota	149	0	Running	39
6	1	4	John Hunter Nemechek	Kyle Busch Motorsports	Toyota	149	14	Running	44
7	2	51	Corey Heim (R)	Kyle Busch Motorsports	Toyota	149	1	Running	35
8	7	18	Chandler Smith	Kyle Busch Motorsports	Toyota	149	0	Running	35
9	21	88	Matt Crafton	ThorSport Racing	Toyota	149	0	Running	28
10	34	25	Matt DiBenedetto	Rackley W.A.R.	Chevrolet	149	0	Running	27
11	11	23	Grant Enfinger	GMS Racing	Chevrolet	149	0	Running	26
12	14	41	Ben Rhodes	ThorSport Racing	Toyota	149	0	Running	0
13	24	62	Todd Bodine	Halmar Friesen Racing	Toyota	149	0	Running	24
14	27	3	Jordan Anderson	Jordan Anderson Racing	Ford	149	0	Running	23
15	31	32	Bret Holmes	Bret Holmes Racing	Chevrolet	149	0	Running	22
16	17	24	Jack Wood (R)	GMS Racing	Chevrolet	149	0	Running	21
17	6	1	Hailie Deegan	David Gilliland Racing	Ford	149	0	Running	20
18	23	22	Austin Wayne Self	AM Racing	Chevrolet	149	0	Running	19
19	22	02	Jesse Little	Young's Motorsports	Chevrolet	149	0	Running	18
20	32	56	Timmy Hill	Hill Motorsports	Toyota	149	0	Running	17
21	19	61	Chase Purdy	Hattori Racing Enterprises	Toyota	149	3	Running	16
22	29	30	Tate Fogleman	On Point Motorsports	Toyota	149	0	Running	15
23	26	46	Brennan Poole (i)	G2G Racing	Toyota	149	0	Running	0
24	12	15	Tanner Gray	David Gilliland Racing	Ford	149	0	Running	13
25	30	5	Tyler Hill	Hill Motorsports	Toyota	149	0	Running	12
26	25	9	Blaine Perkins (R)	CR7 Motorsports	Chevrolet	149	0	Running	11
27	8	99	Ben Rhodes	ThorSport Racing	Toyota	148	0	Running	20
28	28	12	Spencer Boyd	Young's Motorsports	Chevrolet	147	0	Running	9
29	13	40	Dean Thompson (R)	Niece Motorsports	Chevrolet	146	0	Running	8
30	35	45	Lawless Alan (R)	Niece Motorsports	Chevrolet	145	0	Running	7
31	36	33	Chris Hacker	Reaume Brothers Racing	Chevrolet	143	0	Running	6
32	15	38	Zane Smith	Front Row Motorsports	Ford	143	0	Running	13
33	18	16	Tyler Ankrum	Hattori Racing Enterprises	Toyota	139	0	Overheating	5
34	33	91	Colby Howard	McAnally–Hilgemann Racing	Chevrolet	139	0	Running	3
35	16	44	Kris Wright	Niece Motorsports	Chevrolet	106	0	Accident	2
36	9	19	Derek Kraus	McAnally–Hilgemann Racing	Chevrolet	88	0	Accident	8
Official race results

== Standings after the race ==
Drivers' Championship standings

Pos	Driver	Points
1	John Hunter Nemechek	343
2	Ben Rhodes	339 (-4)
3	Chandler Smith	325 (-18)
4	Stewart Friesen	322 (-21)
5	Zane Smith	311 (-32)
6	Ty Majeski	310 (-33)
7	Christian Eckes	298 (-45)
8	Carson Hocevar	284 (-59)
9	Grant Enfinger	262 (-81)
10	Matt Crafton	260 (-83)
Official driver's standings

- Note: Only the first 10 positions are included for the driver standings.

Previous race: 2022 Heart of America 200	NASCAR Camping World Truck Series; 2022 season	Next race: 2022 North Carolina Education Lottery 200
