= 2022 North Carolina Education Lottery 200 =

Race details
- Race 10 of 23 of the 2022 NASCAR Camping World Truck Series
- Date: May 27, 2022
- Official name: 20th Annual North Carolina Education Lottery 200
- Location: Concord, North Carolina, Charlotte Motor Speedway
- Course: Permanent racing facility
- Course length: 1.5 miles (2.4 km)
- Distance: 143 laps, 214.4 mi (345.204 km)
- Scheduled distance: 134 laps, 201 mi (323.478 km)
- Average speed: 125.827 mph (202.499 km/h)

Pole position
Driver	Ty Majeski	ThorSport Racing
- Time: 30.284

Most laps led
Driver	Carson Hocevar	Niece Motorsports
- Laps: 57

Winner
No. 41	Ross Chastain	Niece Motorsports

Television in the United States
- Network: Fox Sports 1
- Announcers: Vince Welch, Kurt Busch, and Michael Waltrip

Radio in the United States
- Radio: Motor Racing Network

The 2022 North Carolina Education Lottery 200 was the tenth stock car race of the 2022 NASCAR Camping World Truck Series and the 20th iteration of the event. The race was held on Friday, May 27, 2022, in Concord, North Carolina at Charlotte Motor Speedway, a 1.5 miles (2.4 km) permanent quad-oval racetrack. The race was increased from 134 laps to 143 laps, due to several overtime finishes, Ross Chastain, driving for Niece Motorsports, would take the win, after taking advantage of the lead on the final restart. It was his 4th career NASCAR Camping World Truck Series win, and his first of the season. To fill out the podium, Grant Enfinger of GMS Racing and John Hunter Nemechek of Kyle Busch Motorsports would finish second and third, respectively.

== Background ==
Charlotte Motor Speedway is a motorsport complex located in Concord, North Carolina, 13 mi (21 km) outside Charlotte. The complex features a 1.5 mi (2.4 km) quad oval track that hosts NASCAR racing including the prestigious Coca-Cola 600 on Memorial Day weekend, and the Bank of America Roval 400. The speedway was built in 1959 by Bruton Smith and is considered the home track for NASCAR with many race teams located in the Charlotte area. The track is owned and operated by Speedway Motorsports with Greg Walter as track president.

The 2,000 acres (810 ha) complex also features a state-of-the-art 0.25 mi (0.40 km) drag racing strip, ZMAX Dragway. It is the only all-concrete, four-lane drag strip in the United States and hosts NHRA events. Alongside the drag strip is a state-of-the-art clay oval that hosts dirt racing including the World of Outlaws finals among other popular racing events.

=== Entry list ===
- (R) denotes rookie driver.
- (i) denotes driver who are ineligible for series driver points.

#	Driver	Team	Make
1	Hailie Deegan	David Gilliland Racing	Ford
02	Jesse Little	Young's Motorsports	Chevrolet
4	John Hunter Nemechek	Kyle Busch Motorsports	Toyota
9	Blaine Perkins (R)	CR7 Motorsports	Chevrolet
12	Spencer Boyd	Young's Motorsports	Chevrolet
15	Tanner Gray	David Gilliland Racing	Ford
16	Tyler Ankrum	Hattori Racing Enterprises	Toyota
17	Ryan Preece	David Gilliland Racing	Ford
18	Chandler Smith	Kyle Busch Motorsports	Toyota
19	Derek Kraus	McAnally–Hilgemann Racing	Chevrolet
20	Matt Mills (i)	Young's Motorsports	Chevrolet
22	Austin Wayne Self	AM Racing	Chevrolet
23	Grant Enfinger	GMS Racing	Chevrolet
24	Jack Wood (R)	GMS Racing	Chevrolet
25	Matt DiBenedetto	Rackley W.A.R.	Chevrolet
30	Tate Fogleman	On Point Motorsports	Toyota
33	Josh Reaume	Reaume Brothers Racing	Toyota
37	Max Gutiérrez	AM Racing	Chevrolet
38	Zane Smith	Front Row Motorsports	Ford
40	Dean Thompson (R)	Niece Motorsports	Chevrolet
41	Ross Chastain (i)	Niece Motorsports	Chevrolet
42	Carson Hocevar	Niece Motorsports	Chevrolet
43	Keith McGee	Reaume Brothers Racing	Toyota
44	Kris Wright	Niece Motorsports	Chevrolet
45	Lawless Alan (R)	Niece Motorsports	Chevrolet
46	Brennan Poole (i)	G2G Racing	Toyota
51	Kyle Busch (i)	Kyle Busch Motorsports	Toyota
52	Stewart Friesen	Halmar Friesen Racing	Toyota
56	Timmy Hill	Hill Motorsports	Toyota
61	Chase Purdy	Hattori Racing Enterprises	Toyota
66	Ty Majeski	ThorSport Racing	Toyota
88	Matt Crafton	ThorSport Racing	Toyota
91	Colby Howard	McAnally–Hilgemann Racing	Chevrolet
98	Christian Eckes	ThorSport Racing	Toyota
99	Ben Rhodes	ThorSport Racing	Toyota
Official entry list

== Practice ==
The only 30-minute was held on Friday, May 27, at 1:30 PM EST. Zane Smith of Front Row Motorsports was the fastest in the session, with a time of 30.519 seconds and a speed of 176.939 mph (284.756 km/h).

Pos.	#	Driver	Team	Make	Time	Speed
1	38	Zane Smith	Front Row Motorsports	Ford	30.519	176.939
2	25	Matt DiBenedetto	Rackley W.A.R.	Chevrolet	30.600	176.471
3	42	Carson Hocevar	Niece Motorsports	Chevrolet	30.761	175.547
Full practice results

== Qualifying ==
Qualifying was held on Friday, May 27, at 2:00 PM EST. Since Charlotte Motor Speedway is an oval track, the qualifying system used is a single-car, one-lap system with only one round. Whoever sets the fastest time in the round wins the pole.

Ty Majeski of ThorSport Racing scored the pole for the race, with a time of 30.284 and a speed of 178.312 mph (286.965 km/h).

Pos.	#	Driver	Team	Make	Time	Speed
1	66	Ty Majeski	ThorSport Racing	Toyota	30.284	178.312
2	38	Zane Smith	Front Row Motorsports	Ford	30.290	178.277
3	51	Kyle Busch (i)	Joe Gibbs Racing	Toyota	30.364	177.842
4	42	Carson Hocevar	Niece Motorsports	Chevrolet	30.405	177.602
5	41	Ross Chastain (i)	Niece Motorsports	Chevrolet	30.405	177.602
6	15	Tanner Gray	David Gilliland Racing	Ford	30.483	177.148
7	18	Chandler Smith	Kyle Busch Motorsports	Toyota	30.500	177.049
8	17	Ryan Preece	David Gilliland Racing	Ford	30.516	176.956
9	98	Christian Eckes	ThorSport Racing	Toyota	30.586	176.551
10	25	Matt DiBenedetto	Rackley W.A.R.	Chevrolet	30.643	176.223
11	23	Grant Enfinger	GMS Racing	Chevrolet	30.654	176.160
12	99	Ben Rhodes	ThorSport Racing	Toyota	30.743	175.650
13	52	Stewart Friesen	Halmar Friesen Racing	Toyota	30.846	175.063
14	02	Jesse Little	Young's Motorsports	Chevrolet	30.925	174.616
15	4	John Hunter Nemechek	Kyle Busch Motorsports	Toyota	30.995	174.222
16	19	Derek Kraus	McAnally–Hilgemann Racing	Chevrolet	31.052	173.902
17	61	Chase Purdy	Hattori Racing Enterprises	Toyota	31.074	173.779
18	88	Matt Crafton	ThorSport Racing	Toyota	31.115	173.550
19	24	Jack Wood (R)	GMS Racing	Chevrolet	31.140	173.410
20	91	Colby Howard	McAnally–Hilgemann Racing	Chevrolet	31.174	173.221
21	30	Tate Fogleman	On Point Motorsports	Toyota	31.263	172.728
22	44	Kris Wright	Niece Motorsports	Chevrolet	31.389	172.035
23	20	Matt Mills (i)	Young's Motorsports	Chevrolet	31.523	171.303
24	40	Dean Thompson (R)	Niece Motorsports	Chevrolet	31.535	171.238
25	16	Tyler Ankrum	Hattori Racing Enterprises	Toyota	31.600	170.886
26	22	Austin Wayne Self	AM Racing	Chevrolet	31.625	170.751
27	12	Spencer Boyd	Young's Motorsports	Chevrolet	31.652	170.605
28	46	Brennan Poole (i)	G2G Racing	Toyota	31.661	170.557
29	9	Blaine Perkins (R)	CR7 Motorsports	Chevrolet	31.670	170.508
30	56	Timmy Hill	Hill Motorsports	Toyota	31.850	169.545
31	37	Max Gutiérrez	AM Racing	Chevrolet	31.980	168.856
Qualified by owner's points
32	33	Josh Reaume	Reaume Brothers Racing	Toyota	32.006	168.718
33	45	Lawless Alan (R)	Niece Motorsports	Chevrolet	32.036	168.560
34	43	Keith McGee	Reaume Brothers Racing	Toyota	33.192	162.690
35	1	Hailie Deegan	David Gilliland Racing	Ford	-	-
Official qualifying results
Official starting lineup

== Race results ==
Stage 1 Laps: 30

Pos.	#	Driver	Team	Make	Pts
1	38	Zane Smith	Front Row Motorsports	Ford	10
2	66	Ty Majeski	ThorSport Racing	Toyota	9
3	17	Ryan Preece	David Gilliland Racing	Ford	8
4	42	Carson Hocevar	Niece Motorsports	Chevrolet	7
5	41	Ross Chastain (i)	Niece Motorsports	Chevrolet	0
6	51	Kyle Busch (i)	Kyle Busch Motorsports	Toyota	0
7	25	Matt DiBenedetto	Rackley W.A.R.	Chevrolet	4
8	98	Christian Eckes	ThorSport Racing	Toyota	3
9	88	Matt Crafton	ThorSport Racing	Toyota	2
10	23	Grant Enfinger	GMS Racing	Chevrolet	1

Stage 2 Laps: 30

Pos.	#	Driver	Team	Make	Pts
1	99	Ben Rhodes	ThorSport Racing	Toyota	10
2	98	Christian Eckes	ThorSport Racing	Toyota	9
3	17	Ryan Preece	David Gilliland Racing	Ford	8
4	42	Carson Hocevar	Niece Motorsports	Chevrolet	7
5	4	John Hunter Nemechek	Kyle Busch Motorsports	Toyota	6
6	38	Zane Smith	Front Row Motorsports	Ford	5
7	25	Matt DiBenedetto	Rackley W.A.R.	Chevrolet	4
8	41	Ross Chastain (i)	Niece Motorsports	Chevrolet	0
9	66	Ty Majeski	ThorSport Racing	Toyota	2
10	19	Derek Kraus	McAnally–Hilgemann Racing	Chevrolet	1

Stage 3 Laps: 83

Fin.	St	#	Driver	Team	Make	Laps	Led	Status	Pts
1	5	41	Ross Chastain (i)	Niece Motorsports	Chevrolet	143	4	Running	0
2	11	23	Grant Enfinger	GMS Racing	Chevrolet	143	0	Running	36
3	15	4	John Hunter Nemechek	Kyle Busch Motorsports	Toyota	143	0	Running	40
4	9	98	Christian Eckes	ThorSport Racing	Toyota	143	5	Running	45
5	2	38	Zane Smith	Front Row Motorsports	Ford	143	52	Running	47
6	6	15	Tanner Gray	David Gilliland Racing	Ford	143	0	Running	31
7	3	51	Kyle Busch (i)	Kyle Busch Motorsports	Toyota	143	0	Running	0
8	7	18	Chandler Smith	Kyle Busch Motorsports	Toyota	143	0	Running	29
9	13	52	Stewart Friesen	Halmar Friesen Racing	Toyota	143	0	Running	28
10	12	99	Ben Rhodes	ThorSport Racing	Toyota	143	5	Running	37
11	8	17	Ryan Preece	David Gilliland Racing	Ford	143	9	Running	42
12	16	19	Derek Kraus	McAnally–Hilgemann Racing	Chevrolet	143	2	Running	26
13	1	66	Ty Majeski	ThorSport Racing	Toyota	143	4	Running	35
14	20	91	Colby Howard	McAnally–Hilgemann Racing	Chevrolet	143	0	Running	23
15	17	61	Chase Purdy	Hattori Racing Enterprises	Toyota	143	0	Running	22
16	4	42	Carson Hocevar	Niece Motorsports	Chevrolet	143	57	Running	35
17	10	25	Matt DiBenedetto	Rackley W.A.R.	Chevrolet	142	0	Running	28
18	18	88	Matt Crafton	ThorSport Racing	Toyota	142	5	Running	21
19	22	44	Kris Wright	Niece Motorsports	Chevrolet	142	0	Running	18
20	25	16	Tyler Ankrum	Hattori Racing Enterprises	Toyota	142	0	Running	17
21	30	56	Timmy Hill	Hill Motorsports	Toyota	141	0	Running	16
22	33	45	Lawless Alan (R)	Niece Motorsports	Chevrolet	141	0	Running	15
23	19	24	Jack Wood (R)	GMS Racing	Chevrolet	141	0	Running	14
24	27	12	Spencer Boyd	Young's Motorsports	Chevrolet	141	0	Running	13
25	26	22	Austin Wayne Self	AM Racing	Chevrolet	141	0	Running	12
26	31	37	Max Gutiérrez	AM Racing	Chevrolet	140	0	Running	11
27	35	1	Hailie Deegan	David Gilliland Racing	Ford	140	0	Running	10
28	24	40	Dean Thompson (R)	Niece Motorsports	Chevrolet	139	0	Running	9
29	21	30	Tate Fogleman	On Point Motorsports	Toyota	139	0	Running	8
30	29	9	Blaine Perkins (R)	CR7 Motorsports	Chevrolet	139	0	Running	7
31	32	33	Josh Reaume	Reaume Brothers Racing	Toyota	138	0	Running	6
32	14	02	Jesse Little	Young's Motorsports	Chevrolet	128	0	Accident	5
33	34	43	Keith McGee	Reaume Brothers Racing	Toyota	67	0	Suspension	4
34	23	20	Matt Mills (i)	Young's Motorsports	Chevrolet	57	0	Accident	0
35	28	46	Brennan Poole	G2G Racing	Toyota	38	0	Driveshaft	2
Official race results

== Standings after the race ==
Drivers' Championship standings

Pos	Driver	Points
1	John Hunter Nemechek	383
2	Ben Rhodes	376 (-7)
3	Zane Smith	358 (-25)
4	Chandler Smith	354 (-29)
5	Stewart Friesen	350 (-33)
6	Ty Majeski	345 (-38)
7	Christian Eckes	343 (-40)
8	Carson Hocevar	319 (-64)
9	Grant Enfinger	298 (-85)
10	Matt Crafton	281 (-102)
Official driver's standings

- Note: Only the first 10 positions are included for the driver standings.

Previous race: 2022 SpeedyCash.com 220	NASCAR Camping World Truck Series; 2022 season	Next race: 2022 Toyota 200
