= 2022 Victoria's Voice Foundation 200 =

Second race of the 2022 NASCAR Camping World Truck Series

Race details
- Race 2 of 23 of the 2022 NASCAR Camping World Truck Series
- Date: March 4, 2022
- Official name: 26th Annual Victoria's Voice Foundation 200
- Location: North Las Vegas, Nevada, Las Vegas Motor Speedway
- Course: Permanent racing facility
- Course length: 1.5 miles (2.41 km)
- Distance: 134 laps, 201 mi (323.478 km)
- Scheduled distance: 134 laps, 201 mi (323.478 km)
- Average speed: 93.223 mph (150.028 km/h)

Pole position
Driver	John Hunter Nemechek	Kyle Busch Motorsports
- Time: 30.238

Most laps led
Driver	Chandler Smith	Kyle Busch Motorsports
- Laps: 32

Winner
No. 18	Chandler Smith	Kyle Busch Motorsports

Television in the United States
- Network: Fox Sports 1
- Announcers: Vince Welch, Michael Waltrip, Kurt Busch

Radio in the United States
- Radio: Motor Racing Network

The 2022 Victoria's Voice Foundation 200 was the second stock car race of the 2022 NASCAR Camping World Truck Series and the 26th iteration of the event. The race was held on Friday, March 4, 2022, in North Las Vegas, Nevada at Las Vegas Motor Speedway, a 1.5 miles (2.4 km) permanent D-shaped oval racetrack. The race was run over 134 laps. Chandler Smith of Kyle Busch Motorsports would win the race after making a last lap pass on Zane Smith. This was Smith's third career win, and the first of the season. To fill out the podium, Kyle Busch of Kyle Busch Motorsports and Stewart Friesen of Halmar Friesen Racing would finish second and third, respectively. Zane Smith was going to be awarded with second place, but was disqualified after post-race inspection, due to the team having lug nuts that didn't meet the NASCAR specifications.

== Background ==
Las Vegas Motor Speedway, located in Clark County, Nevada outside the Las Vegas city limits and about 15 miles northeast of the Las Vegas Strip, is a 1,200-acre (490 ha) complex of multiple tracks for motorsports racing. The complex is owned by Speedway Motorsports, Inc., which is headquartered in Charlotte, North Carolina.

=== Entry list ===
- (R) denotes rookie driver.
- (i) denotes driver who is ineligible for series driver points.

#	Driver	Team	Make
1	Hailie Deegan	David Gilliland Racing	Ford
02	Kaz Grala	Young's Motorsports	Chevrolet
3	Jordan Anderson	Jordan Anderson Racing	Chevrolet
4	John Hunter Nemechek	Kyle Busch Motorsports	Toyota
9	Blaine Perkins (R)	CR7 Motorsports	Chevrolet
12	Spencer Boyd	Young's Motorsports	Chevrolet
15	Tanner Gray	David Gilliland Racing	Ford
16	Tyler Ankrum	Hattori Racing Enterprises	Toyota
17	Ryan Preece (i)	David Gilliland Racing	Ford
18	Chandler Smith	Kyle Busch Motorsports	Toyota
19	Derek Kraus	McAnally-Hilgemann Racing	Chevrolet
20	Matt Mills (i)	Young's Motorsports	Chevrolet
22	Austin Wayne Self	AM Racing	Chevrolet
23	Grant Enfinger	GMS Racing	Chevrolet
24	Jack Wood (R)	GMS Racing	Chevrolet
25	Matt DiBenedetto	Rackley WAR	Chevrolet
30	Tate Fogleman	On Point Motorsports	Toyota
32	Bret Holmes	Bret Holmes Racing	Chevrolet
33	Loris Hezemans	Reaume Brothers Racing	Toyota
38	Zane Smith	Front Row Motorsports	Ford
40	Dean Thompson (R)	Niece Motorsports	Chevrolet
42	Carson Hocevar	Niece Motorsports	Chevrolet
43	Thad Moffitt	Reaume Brothers Racing	Chevrolet
44	Kris Wright	Niece Motorsports	Chevrolet
45	Lawless Alan (R)	Niece Motorsports	Chevrolet
46	Brennan Poole* (i)	G2G Racing	Toyota
47	Matt Jaskol	G2G Racing	Toyota
51	Kyle Busch (i)	Kyle Busch Motorsports	Toyota
52	Stewart Friesen	Halmar Friesen Racing	Toyota
56	Timmy Hill	Hill Motorsports	Toyota
61	Chase Purdy	Hattori Racing Enterprises	Toyota
62	Todd Bodine	Halmar Friesen Racing	Toyota
66	Ty Majeski	ThorSport Racing	Toyota
88	Matt Crafton	ThorSport Racing	Toyota
91	Colby Howard	McAnally-Hilgemann Racing	Chevrolet
98	Christian Eckes	ThorSport Racing	Toyota
99	Ben Rhodes	ThorSport Racing	Toyota
Official entry list

*Driver changed to Matt Jaskol for the race after Jaskol failed to qualify.[3]

== Practice ==
The only 30-minute practice session was held on Friday, March 4, at 1:30 PM PST. Ty Majeski of ThorSport Racing would set the fastest time in the session, with a time of 30.431 seconds, and a speed of 177.451 mph (285.580 km/h).

Pos.	#	Driver	Team	Make	Time	Speed
1	66	Ty Majeski	ThorSport Racing	Toyota	30.431	177.451
2	18	Chandler Smith	Kyle Busch Motorsports	Toyota	30.448	177.352
3	4	John Hunter Nemechek	Kyle Busch Motorsports	Toyota	30.530	176.852
Full practice results

== Qualifying ==
Qualifying was held on Friday, March 4, at 2:00 PM PST. Since Las Vegas Motor Speedway is an oval track, the qualifying system used is a single-car, single-lap system with only one round. Whoever sets the fastest time in the round wins the pole.

John Hunter Nemechek scored the pole for the race with a time of 30.238 seconds and a speed of 178.583 mph (287.401 km/h).

Pos.	#	Driver	Team	Make	Time	Speed
1	4	John Hunter Nemechek	Kyle Busch Motorsports	Toyota	30.238	178.583
2	51	Kyle Busch (i)	Kyle Busch Motorsports	Toyota	30.337	178.000
3	18	Chandler Smith	Kyle Busch Motorsports	Toyota	30.371	177.801
4	99	Ben Rhodes	ThorSport Racing	Toyota	30.396	177.655
5	17	Ryan Preece (i)	David Gilliland Racing	Ford	30.446	177.363
6	38	Zane Smith	Front Row Motorsports	Ford	30.511	176.985
7	88	Matt Crafton	ThorSport Racing	Toyota	30.573	176.626
8	15	Tanner Gray	David Gilliland Racing	Ford	30.602	176.459
9	98	Christian Eckes	ThorSport Racing	Toyota	30.608	176.424
10	66	Ty Majeski	ThorSport Racing	Toyota	30.618	176.367
11	23	Grant Enfinger	GMS Racing	Chevrolet	30.643	176.223
12	42	Carson Hocevar	Niece Motorsports	Chevrolet	30.657	176.142
13	19	Derek Kraus	McAnally-Hilgemann Racing	Chevrolet	30.683	175.993
14	16	Tyler Ankrum	Hattori Racing Enterprises	Toyota	30.693	175.936
15	25	Matt DiBenedetto	Rackley WAR	Chevrolet	30.707	175.856
16	44	Kris Wright	Niece Motorsports	Chevrolet	30.723	175.764
17	52	Stewart Friesen	Halmar Friesen Racing	Toyota	30.724	175.758
18	22	Austin Wayne Self	AM Racing	Chevrolet	30.744	175.644
19	61	Chase Purdy	Hattori Racing Enterprises	Toyota	30.753	175.593
20	1	Hailie Deegan	David Gilliland Racing	Ford	30.776	175.461
21	30	Tate Fogleman	On Point Motorsports	Toyota	30.843	175.080
22	91	Colby Howard	McAnally-Hilgemann Racing	Chevrolet	30.863	174.967
23	62	Todd Bodine	Halmar Friesen Racing	Toyota	30.884	174.848
24	24	Jack Wood (R)	GMS Racing	Chevrolet	30.902	174.746
25	02	Kaz Grala	Young's Motorsports	Chevrolet	30.911	174.695
26	45	Lawless Alan (R)	Niece Motorsports	Chevrolet	30.993	174.233
27	20	Matt Mills (i)	Young's Motorsports	Chevrolet	31.027	174.042
28	56	Timmy Hill	Hill Motorsports	Toyota	31.134	173.444
29	40	Dean Thompson (R)	Niece Motorsports	Chevrolet	31.152	173.344
30	9	Blaine Perkins (R)	CR7 Motorsports	Chevrolet	31.172	173.232
31	43	Thad Moffitt	Reaume Brothers Racing	Chevrolet	31.541	171.206
Qualified by owner's points
32	32	Bret Holmes	Bret Holmes Racing	Chevrolet	31.644	170.648
33	46	Brennan Poole (i)	G2G Racing	Toyota	31.767	169.988
34	3	Jordan Anderson	Jordan Anderson Racing	Chevrolet	32.011	168.692
35	12	Spencer Boyd	Young's Motorsports	Chevrolet	32.096	168.245
36	33	Loris Hezemans	Reaume Brothers Racing	Toyota	32.439	166.466
Failed to qualify
37	47	Matt Jaskol	G2G Racing	Toyota	32.100	168.224
Official qualifying results
Official starting lineup

== Race results ==
Stage 1 Laps: 30

Pos.	#	Driver	Team	Make	Pts
1	99	Ben Rhodes	ThorSport Racing	Toyota	10
2	18	Chandler Smith	Kyle Busch Motorsports	Toyota	9
3	15	Tanner Gray	David Gilliland Racing	Ford	8
4	24	Jack Wood (R)	GMS Racing	Chevrolet	7
5	42	Carson Hocevar	Niece Motorsports	Chevrolet	6
6	88	Matt Crafton	ThorSport Racing	Toyota	5
7	51	Kyle Busch (i)	Kyle Busch Motorsports	Toyota	0
8	4	John Hunter Nemechek	Kyle Busch Motorsports	Toyota	3
9	66	Ty Majeski	ThorSport Racing	Toyota	2
10	17	Ryan Preece (i)	David Gilliland Racing	Ford	0

Stage 2 Laps: 30

Pos.	#	Driver	Team	Make	Pts
1	99	Ben Rhodes	ThorSport Racing	Toyota	10
2	51	Kyle Busch (i)	Kyle Busch Motorsports	Toyota	0
3	66	Ty Majeski	ThorSport Racing	Toyota	8
4	4	John Hunter Nemechek	Kyle Busch Motorsports	Toyota	7
5	15	Tanner Gray	David Gilliland Racing	Ford	6
6	18	Chandler Smith	Kyle Busch Motorsports	Toyota	5
7	88	Matt Crafton	ThorSport Racing	Toyota	4
8	98	Christian Eckes	ThorSport Racing	Toyota	3
9	52	Stewart Friesen	Halmar Friesen Racing	Toyota	2
10	19	Derek Kraus	McAnally-Hilgemann Racing	Chevrolet	1

Stage 3 Laps: 74

Fin.	St	#	Driver	Team	Make	Laps	Led	Status	Points
1	3	18	Chandler Smith	Kyle Busch Motorsports	Toyota	134	32	Running	54
2	2	51	Kyle Busch (i)	Kyle Busch Motorsports	Toyota	134	31	Running	0
3	17	52	Stewart Friesen	Halmar Friesen Racing	Toyota	134	0	Running	36
4	5	17	Ryan Preece (i)	David Gilliland Racing	Ford	134	3	Running	0
5	8	15	Tanner Gray	David Gilliland Racing	Ford	134	7	Running	46
6	15	25	Matt DiBenedetto	Rackley WAR	Chevrolet	134	0	Running	31
7	7	88	Matt Crafton	ThorSport Racing	Toyota	134	0	Running	39
8	32	32	Bret Holmes	Bret Holmes Racing	Chevrolet	134	0	Running	29
9	18	22	Austin Wayne Self	AM Racing	Chevrolet	134	0	Running	28
10	10	66	Ty Majeski	ThorSport Racing	Toyota	134	0	Running	37
11	29	40	Dean Thompson (R)	Niece Motorsports	Chevrolet	134	0	Running	26
12	21	30	Tate Fogleman	On Point Motorsports	Toyota	134	0	Running	25
13	12	42	Carson Hocevar	Niece Motorsports	Chevrolet	134	9	Running	30
14	19	61	Chase Purdy	Hattori Racing Enterprises	Toyota	134	0	Running	23
15	27	20	Matt Mills (i)	Young's Motorsports	Chevrolet	134	0	Running	0
16	14	16	Tyler Ankrum	Hattori Racing Enterprises	Toyota	134	0	Running	21
17	16	44	Kris Wright	Niece Motorsports	Chevrolet	134	0	Running	20
18	28	56	Timmy Hill	Hill Motorsports	Toyota	134	1	Running	19
19	26	45	Lawless Alan (R)	Niece Motorsports	Chevrolet	134	0	Running	18
20	36	33	Loris Hezemans	Reaume Brothers Racing	Toyota	134	0	Running	17
21	23	62	Todd Bodine	Halmar Friesen Racing	Toyota	134	0	Running	16
22	33	46	Matt Jaskol	G2G Racing	Toyota	134	0	Running	15
23	11	23	Grant Enfinger	GMS Racing	Chevrolet	134	0	Running	14
24	13	19	Derek Kraus	McAnally-Hilgemann Racing	Chevrolet	134	0	Running	14
25	1	4	John Hunter Nemechek	Kyle Busch Motorsports	Toyota	134	23	Running	22
26	34	3	Jordan Anderson	Jordan Anderson Racing	Chevrolet	133	0	Accident	11
27	35	12	Spencer Boyd	Young's Motorsports	Chevrolet	132	0	Accident	10
28	9	98	Christian Eckes	ThorSport Racing	Toyota	126	4	Accident	12
29	31	43	Thad Moffitt	Reaume Brothers Racing	Chevrolet	114	0	Running	8
30	25	02	Kaz Grala	Young's Motorsports	Chevrolet	113	0	Engine	7
31	4	99	Ben Rhodes	ThorSport Racing	Toyota	103	9	Accident	26
32	24	24	Jack Wood (R)	GMS Racing	Chevrolet	71	0	Accident	12
33	20	1	Hailie Deegan	David Gilliland Racing	Ford	44	0	Accident	4
34	22	91	Colby Howard	McAnally-Hilgemann Racing	Chevrolet	28	0	Accident	3
35	30	9	Blaine Perkins (R)	CR7 Motorsports	Chevrolet	21	0	DVP	2
36	6	38	Zane Smith (Note: Smith originally finished second, but was later disqualified.)	Front Row Motorsports	Ford	134	15	Disqualified	1
Official race results

== Standings after the race ==
Drivers' Championship standings

Pos	Driver	Points
1	Chandler Smith	87
2	Tanner Gray	82 (-5)
3	Ty Majeski	72 (-15)
4	Ben Rhodes	70 (-17)
5	Stewart Friesen	65 (-22)
6	Matt DiBenedetto	58 (-29)
7	Carson Hocevar	58 (-29)
8	Austin Wayne Self	57 (-30)
9	Matt Crafton	55 (-32)
10	John Hunter Nemechek	55 (-32)
Official driver's standings

- Note: Only the first 10 positions are included for the driver standings.

Previous race: 2022 NextEra Energy 250	NASCAR Camping World Truck Series; 2022 season	Next race: 2022 Fr8 208
