= Dillon Steuer =

American racing driver (born 2002)

- Born: April 5, 2002 (age 24); Bohemia, New York, U.S.

NASCAR FedEx Freight Truck Series career
- 1 race run over 1 year
- 2022 position: 74th
- Best finish: 74th (2022)
- First race: 2022 Blue-Emu Maximum Pain Relief 200 (Martinsville)
Wins	Top tens	Poles
0	0	0
- Statistics up to date as of November 5, 2022.

Dillon Steuer (born April 5, 2002) is an American professional racing driver. He last competed part-time in the NASCAR Camping World Truck Series driving the No. 20 Chevrolet Silverado for Young's Motorsports.

== Racing career ==
=== Early career ===
Steuer, who comes from a racing family, started racing at the age of ten after watching his father race at Riverhead Raceway in Long Island, New York. In 2016, Steuer's father retired in order to support his son's career.

In 2017, Steuer won the inaugural Islip 300 at Riverhead Raceway at just 15 years old.

=== Whelen Modified Tour ===
Steuer made his NASCAR Whelen Modified Tour debut in 2017 at the Riverhead Raceway, finishing ninth. He also ran at Thompson Speedway, finishing 22nd, and again at Riverhead, finishing seventh.

=== Camping World Truck Series ===
Steuer was announced to make his debut in the NASCAR Camping World Truck Series, running the No. 20 Chevrolet Silverado for Young's Motorsports in the 2022 Blue-Emu Maximum Pain Relief 200 at Martinsville Speedway. Steuer failed to finish the race, coming home in 32nd due to an accident.

== Motorsports career results ==
=== NASCAR ===
(key) (Bold – Pole position awarded by qualifying time. Italics – Pole position earned by points standings or practice time. * – Most laps led.)

==== Camping World Truck Series ====
NASCAR Camping World Truck Series results
Year	Team	No.	Make	1	2	3	4	5	6	7	8	9	10	11	12	13	14	15	16	17	18	19	20	21	22	23	NCWTS	Pts	Ref
2022	Young's Motorsports	20	Chevy	DAY	LVS	ATL	COA	MAR; 32	BRI	DAR	KAN	TEX	CLT	GTW	SON	KNO	NSH	MOH	POC	IRP	RCH	KAN	BRI	TAL	HOM	PHO	74th	5	

==== Whelen Modified Tour ====
NASCAR Whelen Modified Tour results
Year	Car owner	No.	Make	1	2	3	4	5	6	7	8	9	10	11	12	13	14	15	16	NWMTC	Pts	Ref
2017	Chuck Steuer	45	Chevy	MYR	TMP	STA	LGY	TMP	RIV; 9	NHA	STA	TMP; 22	BRI	SEE	OSW	RIV; 7	NHA	STA	TMP	40th	94	

^{*} Season still in progress
^{1} Ineligible for series points
