= Young's Motorsports =

American auto race team

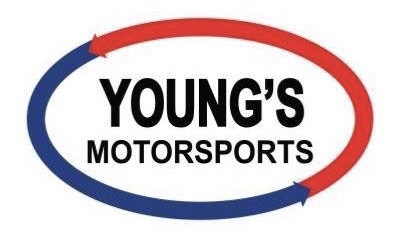
- Owner(s): Randy Young; Tyler Young
- Base: Mooresville, North Carolina
- Series: NASCAR O'Reilly Auto Parts Series
- Race drivers: 02. Patrick Staropoli; 42. Leland Honeyman
- Manufacturer: Chevrolet
- Opened: 2012

Career
- Debut: O'Reilly Auto Parts Series: 2024 United Rentals 300 (Daytona); Truck Series: 2012 North Carolina Education Lottery 200 (Rockingham); ARCA Menards Series: 2021 Lucas Oil 200 (Daytona); ARCA Menards Series East: 2021 General Tire 125 (Dover International Speedway); ARCA Menards Series West: 2021 General Tire 150 (Phoenix)
- Latest race: O'Reilly Auto Parts Series: 2026 O'Reilly Auto Parts 300 (Homestead); Truck Series: 2025 NASCAR Craftsman Truck Series Championship Race (Phoenix); ARCA Menards Series: 2025 Ride the 'Dente 200 (Daytona); ARCA Menards Series East: 2022 Bush's Beans 200 (Bristol); ARCA Menards Series West: 2023 Desert Diamond Casino West Valley 100 (Phoenix)
- Races competed: Total: 419; O'Reilly Auto Parts Series: 99; Truck Series: 285; ARCA Menards Series: 19; ARCA Menards Series East: 9 ARCA Menards Series West: 7
- Drivers' Championships: Total: 0 O'Reilly Auto Parts Series: 0 Truck Series: 0 ARCA Menards Series: 0 ARCA Menards Series East: 0 ARCA Menards Series West: 0
- Race victories: Total: 2 O'Reilly Auto Parts Series: 0 Truck Series: 2 ARCA Menards Series: 0 ARCA Menards Series East: 0 ARCA Menards Series West: 0
- Pole positions: Total: 2 O'Reilly Auto Parts Series: 0 Truck Series: 1 ARCA Menards Series: 0 ARCA Menards Series East: 1 ARCA Menards Series West: 0

Young's Motorsports is an American professional stock car racing team that competes in the NASCAR O'Reilly Auto Parts Series. They field the No. 02 Chevrolet Camaro SS full-time for Patrick Staropoli and the No. 42 for Leland Honeyman. They previously competed in the NASCAR Craftsman Truck Series and ARCA Menards Series.

== O'Reilly Auto Parts Series ==
=== Car No. 02 history ===
Ryan Ellis in the No. 02 at Sonoma Raceway in 2026

On November 10, 2025, the team announced they would be fielding a second entry in the NASCAR O'Reilly Auto Parts Series. During that same announcement, they announced that Ryan Ellis would drive the No. 02 car.

==== Car No. 02 results ====
Year	Driver	No.	Make	1	2	3	4	5	6	7	8	9	10	11	12	13	14	15	16	17	18	19	20	21	22	23	24	25	26	27	28	29	30	31	32	33	Owners	Pts
2026	Ryan Ellis	02	Chevy	DAY; 6	ATL; 22	COA; 34	PHO; 38	LVS; 30	DAR; 32	MAR; 36	ROC; 22	BRI; 30	KAN; 22	TAL; 36	TEX; 24	GLN; 34	DOV; 25	CLT; 21	NSH; 29	POC; 24	COR; 30	SON; 23	CHI; 22	ATL; 23	IND; 32	IOW; 23	DAY; 17	DAR; 37	GTW; 24	BRI; 27	LVS; 29	CLT; 34	PHO; 18	TAL; 30	MAR; 38	HOM; 29	34th	325

=== Car No. 42 history ===
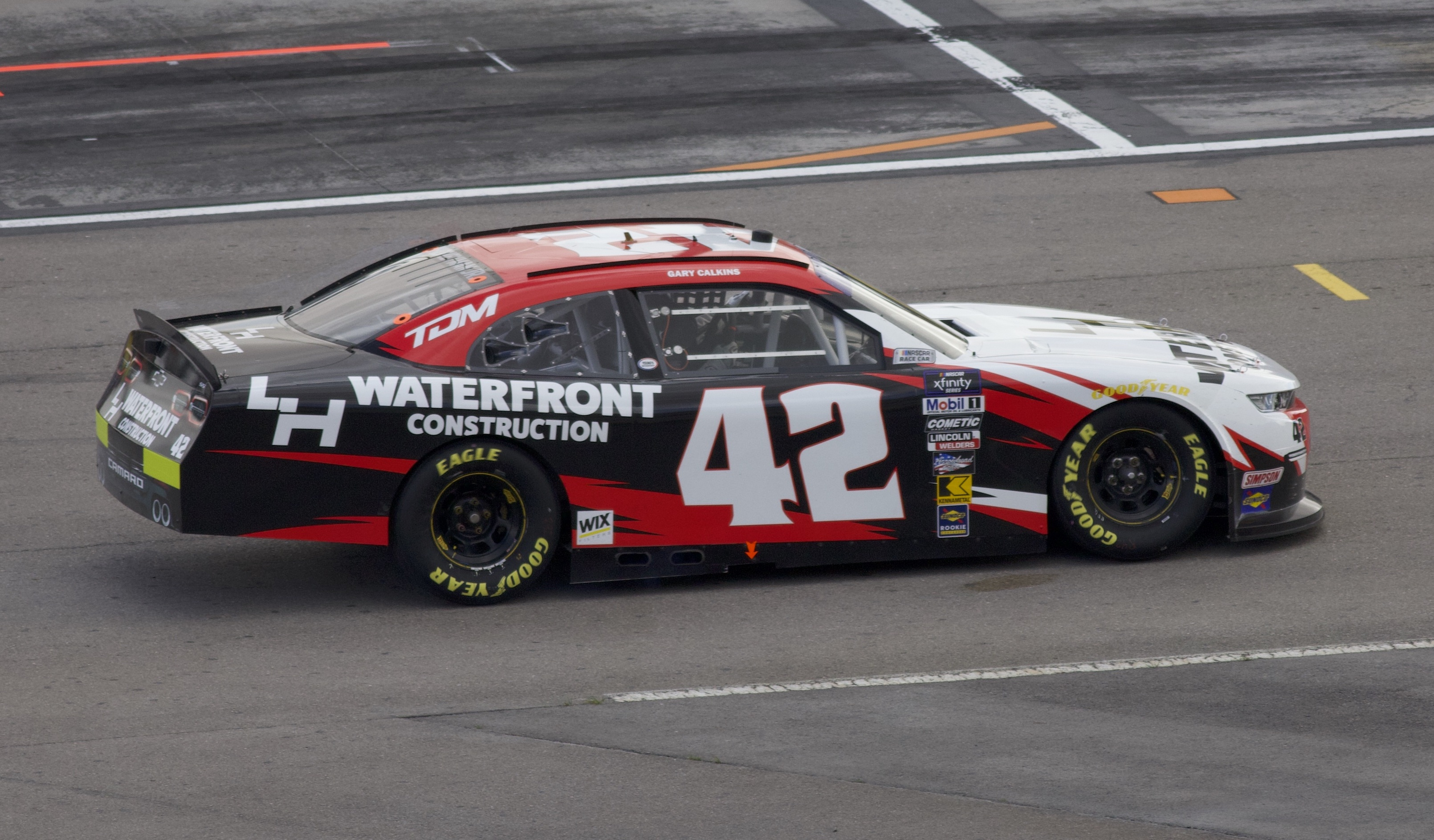
Leland Honeyman at Las Vegas in 2024.

On January 3, 2024, it was announced that the team would field an entry in the NASCAR Xfinity Series in 2024. That same day, Leland Honeyman was announced as the full-time driver of the No. 42 car.

On January 14, 2025, it was announced that Anthony Alfredo would drive the No. 42 car full time.

On February 12, 2026, the team announces that Carson Hocevar will pilot the No. 42 Chevrolet in the 2026 NASCAR O'Reilly Auto Parts Series season opener, the United Rentals 300 at Daytona. Nick Leitz would drive the No. 42 at both Atlanta races. He would also drive the No. 42 at fall Talladega race. J. J. Yeley would drive the No. 42 at Circuit of the Americas. Nathan Byrd would drive the No. 42 for multiple races starting at Phoenix. Brad Perez would drive the No. 42 at Martinsville, Texas, Gateway, fall Phoenix race, and Homestead. Logan Bearden would drive the No. 42 for three races. David Starr would drive the No. 42 at Talldega. Will Rodgers would drive the No. 42 at Watkins Glen with sponsorship from Drydene. He would return to drive the No. 42 at Sonoma. C. J. McLaughlin would drive the No. 42 at Dover. Baltazar Leguizamón would drive the No. 42 at San Diego and fall Martinsville race. Garrett Smithley would drive the No. 42 at Chicagoland. Natalie Decker would drive the No. 42 at summer Daytona race. On September 2, it was announced that Matt DiBenedetto would drive the No. 42 at fall Las Vegas race. He would also drive the No. 42 at fall Charlotte race.

==== Car No. 42 results ====
Year	Driver	No.	Make	1	2	3	4	5	6	7	8	9	10	11	12	13	14	15	16	17	18	19	20	21	22	23	24	25	26	27	28	29	30	31	32	33	Owners	Pts
2024	Leland Honeyman	42	Chevy	DAY; 30	ATL; 21	LVS; 18	PHO; 11	COA; 20	RCH; 20	MAR; 31	TEX; 31	TAL; 4	DOV; 21	DAR; 30	CLT; 23	PIR; 26	SON; 29	IOW; 13	NHA; 37	NSH; 25	CSC; 31	POC; 25	IND; 20	MCH; 12	DAY; 9	DAR; 23	ATL; 17	GLN; 16	BRI; 31	KAN; 25	TAL; 14	ROV; 28	ROV; 37	HOM; 30	MAR; 35	PHO; 31	27th	457
2025	Anthony Alfredo	42	Chevy	DAY; 22	ATL; 37	COA; 21	PHO; 32	LVS; 18	HOM; 18	MAR; 38	DAR; 31	BRI; 15	CAR; 15	TAL; 6	TEX; 12	CLT; 25	NSH; 29	MXC; 21	POC; 13	ATL; 29	CSC; 36	SON; 23	DOV; 23	IND; 23	IOW; 26	GLN; 32	DAY; 37	PIR; 33	GTW; 13	BRI; 22	KAN; 25	ROV; 23	LVS; 24	TAL; 33	MAR; 16	PHO; 23	26th	471
2026	Carson Hocevar	42	Chevy	DAY; 20																																	32nd	365
2026	Nick Leitz	42	Chevy		ATL; 18																			ATL; 29										TAL; 15			32nd	365
2026	J. J. Yeley	42	Chevy			COA; 28																															32nd	365
2026	Nathan Byrd	42	Chevy				PHO; 31	LVS; 32	DAR; 34		ROC; 16		KAN; 24					CLT; 26		POC; 35					IND; 31	IOW; 25											32nd	365
2026	Brad Perez	42	Chevy							MAR; 21					TEX; 36														GTW; 28				PHO; 27			HOM; 32	32nd	365
2026	Logan Bearden	42	Chevy									BRI; 33							NSH; 26									DAR; 28		BRI; 18							32nd	365
2026	David Starr	42	Chevy											TAL; 38																							32nd	365
2026	Will Rodgers	42	Chevy													GLN; 20						SON; 17															32nd	365
2026	C. J. McLaughlin	42	Chevy														DOV; 30																				32nd	365
2026	Baltazar Leguizamón	42	Chevy																		COR; 33														MAR; 27		32nd	365
2026	Garrett Smithley	42	Chevy																				CHI; 18														32nd	365
2026	Natalie Decker	42	Chevy																								DAY; 22										32nd	365
2026	Matt DiBenedetto	42	Chevy																												LVS; 23	CLT; 21					32nd	365

== Craftsman Truck Series ==
=== Truck No. 02 history ===
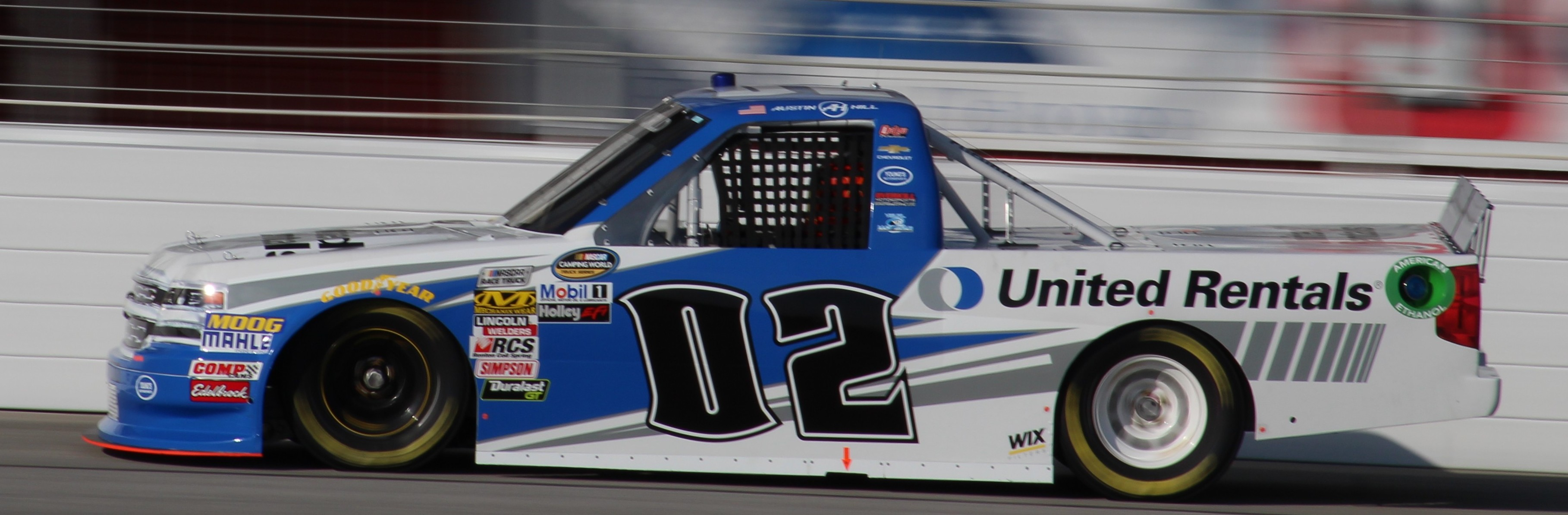
Austin Hill in the No. 02 at Atlanta Motor Speedway in 2018

The team debuted in the 2012 NASCAR Camping World Truck Series season with Tyler Young in a part-time schedule. In 2013, Young returned for a part-time schedule. In 2014 the team ran its first full-time season, again with Young. In 2016, the team returned to a part-time schedule, sharing the No. 02 with Austin Hill Racing and Rette Jones Racing. Dylan Lupton, Austin Theriault, Derek Scott Jr. and Scott Lagasse Jr. also drove the 02 in 2016. In 2017, the team announced that the truck would be split by Austin Hill and Tyler Young. Australian sprint car racing driver Max Johnston drove the truck at Eldora Speedway.

In 2018, Austin Hill drove the 02 full-time. Despite scoring a top-five at Texas, six top-tens and an eleventh-place finish in points, Hill said that rules changes and simple mistakes by the team held them back from greater success.

In 2019, Tyler Dippel joined Young's Motorsports to drive the No. 02 full-time. On August 23, NASCAR announced that Dippel had been suspended indefinitely for violation of the sport's Code of Conduct. D. J. Kennington served as his substitute replacement for the race at Canada. Dippel was reinstated the following week on August 28, 2019.

In 2020, the team announced that Tate Fogleman would compete for Rookie of The Year honors driving the 02 truck. He ended the season with a seventeenth-place points finish with a best finish of thirteenth at Michigan.

In 2021, the team announced that they would be adding Rookie of The Year honor contestant Kris Wright to their No. 02 truck, and they would be moving Fogleman to their No. 12 truck. Wright started the season with a twelfth-place finish at Daytona. At the Daytona Road Course, the team unexpectedly announced that Kaz Grala would replace Wright while he made his Xfinity Series debut, Grala would come in eighth. After Wright had a positive test for COVID-19 just before the race at Atlanta, Josh Berry replaced him, finishing 22nd. Daniel Suárez also replaced Wright at Bristol, finishing seventeenth. At Darlington, Wright ran a throwback scheme to Dale Earnhardt, however, instead of his longtime sponsor Goodwrench, the sponsor was wrightcars.com, with larger letters on the side saying Goodwright. Grala returned at Circuit of the Americas, being in the top-three most of the day and finishing second to Todd Gilliland, whom he battled with for the stage 1 win, which Gilliland won. Michael Annett wanted to make his debut at Knoxville Raceway, but a leg injury caused him to be replaced by Chris Windom. On October 6, NASCAR indefinitely suspended crew chief Eddie Troconis for violation of Sections 12.8.1.c Behavioral.

On December 22, 2021, it was announced that Jesse Little would drive the No. 02 truck in 2022, splitting the ride with Kaz Grala.

On February 8, 2023, it was announced that Wright would return to the No. 02 truck he drove in 2021, and run full-time in the Truck Series in 2023. After earning only three top twenty finishes in the first eleven races, Wright and the team would agree to part ways effective immediately before the race at Gateway. Multiple drivers such as Chris Hacker, Layne Riggs, Will Rodgers, Stefan Parsons, Matt Mills, Josh Bilicki, Kaden Honeycutt, Garrett Smithley, and Brad Perez filled up the rest of the season.

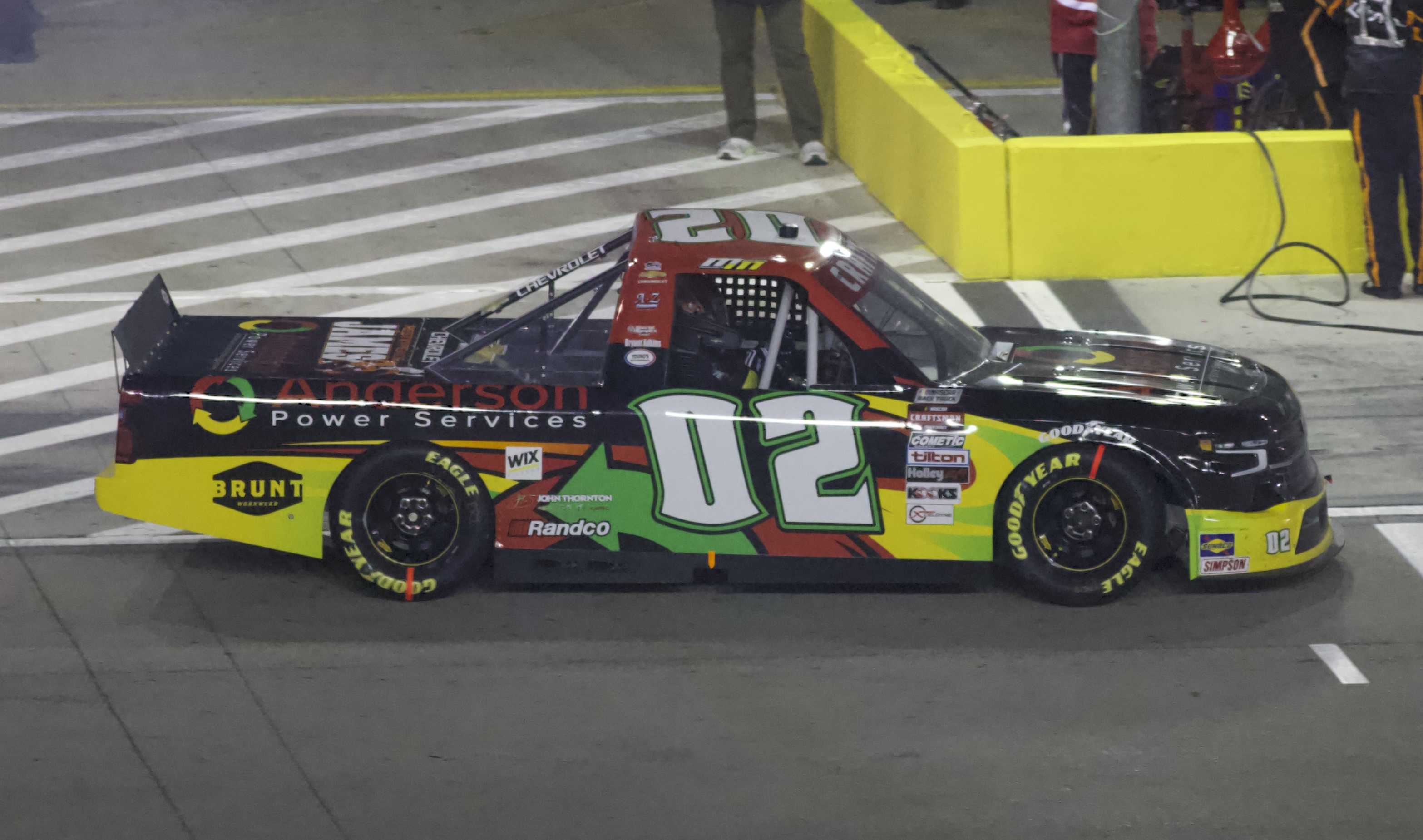
Mason Massey in the No. 02 truck at Las Vegas in 2024.

On February 12, 2024, it was announced that Mason Massey would run full-time in the No. 02 truck Series in 2024. However, he parted ways with the team after the race at Richmond. Multiple drivers such as Dexter Bean, Justin Mondeik, Nathan Byrd, Keith McGee, and Dylan Lupton filled up the rest of the season.

On January 27, 2025, the team announced that Nathan Byrd would drive the No. 02 for the majority of the 2025 Truck season, competing in fifteen of 25 races for the team.

==== Truck No. 02 results ====
Year	Driver	No.	Make	1	2	3	4	5	6	7	8	9	10	11	12	13	14	15	16	17	18	19	20	21	22	23	24	25	Owner	Pts
2012	Tyler Young	02	Chevy	DAY	MAR	CAR; 28	KAN	CLT	DOV	TEX	KEN; 23	IOW	CHI	POC	MCH	BRI; 20	ATL	IOW	KEN	LVS	TAL	MAR; 30	TEX	PHO	HOM				46th	75
2013	Tyler Young	02	Chevy	DAY	MAR	CAR	KAN	CLT; 29	DOV	TEX; 19	KEN	IOW; 27	ELD	POC	MCH	BRI; 24	MSP	IOW	CHI; 22	LVS	TAL	MAR	TEX; 24	PHO	HOM				38th	119
2014	Tyler Young	02	Chevy	DAY; 34	MAR; 31	KAN; 23	CLT; 28	DOV; 17	TEX; 15	GTW; 17	KEN; 20	IOW; 17	ELD; 15	POC; 26	MCH; 14	BRI; 18	MSP; 18	CHI; 11	NHA; 24	LVS; 19	TAL; 17	MAR; 19	TEX; 14	PHO; 18	HOM; 24				19th	529
2015	Tyler Young	02	Chevy	DAY; 13	ATL; 22	MAR; 20	KAN; 23	CLT; 18	DOV; 10	TEX; 14	GTW; 15	IOW; 20	KEN; 26	ELD; 13	POC; 15	MCH; 15	BRI; 17	MSP; 17	CHI; 15	NHA; 16	LVS; 17	TAL; 10	MAR; 13	TEX; 23	PHO; 13	HOM; 19			17th	629
2016	Tyler Young	02	Chevy	DAY; 6	ATL; 13	MAR; 13	KAN; 11	DOV; 21	CLT; 19	TEX; 21		GTW; 13		ELD; 20			MCH; 10	MSP; 28	CHI; 16		LVS; 23			TEX; 26					19th	311
2016	Derek Scott Jr.	02	Chevy								IOW; 25																		19th	311
2016	Austin Hill	02	Ford										KEN; 18		POC; 31	BRI; 19				NHA; 30									19th	311
2016	Dylan Lupton	02	Chevy																			TAL; 12							19th	311
2016	Austin Theriault	02	Chevy																				MAR; 20						19th	311
2016	Dominique Van Wieringen	02	Ford																						PHO; 31				19th	311
2016	Scott Lagasse Jr.	02	Chevy																							HOM; 22			19th	311
2017	Tyler Young	02	Chevy	DAY; 23			KAN; 14			TEX; 23						MCH; 14			CHI; 13			TAL; 10							15th	459
2017	Austin Hill	02	Ford		ATL; 18	MAR; 14		CLT; 25	DOV; 27		GTW; 14		KEN; 10		POC; 11		BRI; 22			NHA; 22			MAR; 16	TEX; 11	PHO; 23				15th	459
2017	Scott Lagasse Jr.	02	Chevy									IOW; 13																	15th	459
2017	Max Johnston	02	Chevy											ELD; 29															15th	459
2017	Alex Tagliani	02	Chevy															MSP; 19											15th	459
2017	Timothy Peters	02	Chevy																		LVS; 11					HOM; 10			15th	459
2018	Austin Hill	02	Chevy	DAY; 11	ATL; 18	LVS; 10	MAR; 9	DOV; 31	KAN; 12	CLT; 18	TEX; 13	IOW; 14	GTW; 11	CHI; 9	KEN; 16	ELD; 21	POC; 13	MCH; 19	BRI; 21	MSP; 8	LVS; 23	TAL; 10	MAR; 20	TEX; 5	PHO; 30	HOM; 21			15th	520
2019	Tyler Dippel	02	Chevy	DAY; 29	ATL; 11	LVS; 17	MAR; 23	TEX; 8	DOV; 18	KAN; 12	CLT; 13	TEX; 25	IOW; 19	GTW; 15	CHI; 12	KEN; 12	POC; 11	ELD; 8	MCH; 3	BRI; 24		LVS; 26	TAL; 31	MAR; 30	PHO; 15	HOM; 18			15th	477
2019	D. J. Kennington	02	Chevy																		MSP; 15								15th	477
2020	Tate Fogleman	02	Chevy	DAY; 30	LVS; 19	CLT; 17	ATL; 31	HOM; 23	POC; 34	KEN; 21	TEX; 32	KAN; 22	KAN; 17	MCH; 13	DAY; 19	DOV; 27	GTW; 18	DAR; 15	RCH; 15	BRI; 21	LVS; 16	TAL; 31	KAN; 17	TEX; 33	MAR; 36	PHO; 19			24th	334
2021	Kris Wright	02	Chevy	DAY; 12		LVS; 25			RCH; 35	KAN; 33	DAR; 39		CLT; 23	TEX; 22	NSH; 32	POC; 30			GTW; 18	DAR; 28	BRI; 36	LVS; 16	TAL; 36	MAR; 13	PHO; 32				21st	335
2021	Kaz Grala	02	Chevy		DRC; 8							COA; 2						GLN; 12											21st	335
2021	Josh Berry	02	Chevy				ATL; 22																						21st	335
2021	Daniel Suárez	02	Chevy					BRI; 17																					21st	335
2021	Chris Windom	02	Chevy														KNX; 15												21st	335
2022	Jesse Little	02	Chevy	DAY; 6		ATL; 15		MAR; 27		DAR; 14	KAN; 24	TEX; 19	CLT; 32	GTW; 20			NSH; 19						BRI; 25						20th	399
2022	Kaz Grala	02	Chevy		LVS; 30		COA; 14		BRD; 26						SON; 14	KNX; 26		MOH; 7	POC; 23	IRP; 20	RCH; 22	KAN; 18		TAL; 18	HOM; 18				20th	399
2022	Johnny Sauter	02	Chevy																							PHO; 28			20th	399
2023	Kris Wright	02	Chevy	DAY; 22	LVS; 28	ATL; 15	COA; 21	TEX; 12	BRD; 32	MAR; 16	KAN; 28	DAR; 29	NWS; 22	CLT; 32															28th	264
2023	Chris Hacker	02	Chevy												GTW; 27														28th	264
2023	Layne Riggs	02	Chevy													NSH; 27													28th	264
2023	Will Rodgers	02	Chevy														MOH; 34		RCH; 26										28th	264
2023	Stefan Parsons	02	Chevy															POC; 28											28th	264
2023	Matt Mills	02	Chevy																	IRP; 23									28th	264
2023	Josh Bilicki	02	Chevy																		MLW; 36								28th	264
2023	Kaden Honeycutt	02	Chevy																			KAN; 27	BRI; 25			PHO; 8			28th	264
2023	Garrett Smithley	02	Chevy																					TAL; 15					28th	264
2023	Brad Perez	02	Chevy																						HOM; 24				28th	264
2024	Mason Massey	02	Chevy	DAY; 25	ATL; 20	LVS; 21	BRI; 28	COA; 35	MAR; 11	TEX; 20	KAN; 21	DAR; 15	NWS; 23	CLT; 18	GTW; 31	NSH; 32	POC; 24	IRP; 35	RCH; 26										30th	263
2024	Dexter Bean	02	Chevy																	MLW; 30									30th	263
2024	Justin Mondeik	02	Chevy																		BRI; 28								30th	263
2024	Nathan Byrd	02	Chevy																			KAN; 19		HOM; 29		PHO; 26			30th	263
2024	Keith McGee	02	Ford																				TAL; DNQ						30th	263
2024	Dylan Lupton	02	Chevy																						MAR; 34				30th	263
2025	Nathan Byrd	02	Chevy	DAY; 31	ATL; 31	LVS; 29	HOM; 27	MAR; 29	BRI; 28	CAR; 14	TEX; 14	KAN; 29			NSH; 28	MCH; 30	POC; 21					DAR; 27				TAL; 18		PHO; 15	29th	280
2025	Jayson Alexander	02	Chevy										NWS; 30						IRP; 30					NHA; 32					29th	280
2025	Stefan Parsons	02	Chevy											CLT; 22															29th	280
2025	Ben Maier	02	Chevy															LRP; 18							ROV; 25				29th	280
2025	Kaden Honeycutt	02	Chevy																	GLN; 34									29th	280
2025	Nick Leitz	02	Chevy																		RCH; 27								29th	280
2025	Treyten Lapcevich	02	Chevy																				BRI; 32						29th	280
2025	Logan Bearden	02	Chevy																								MAR; 25		29th	280

=== Truck No. 12 history ===
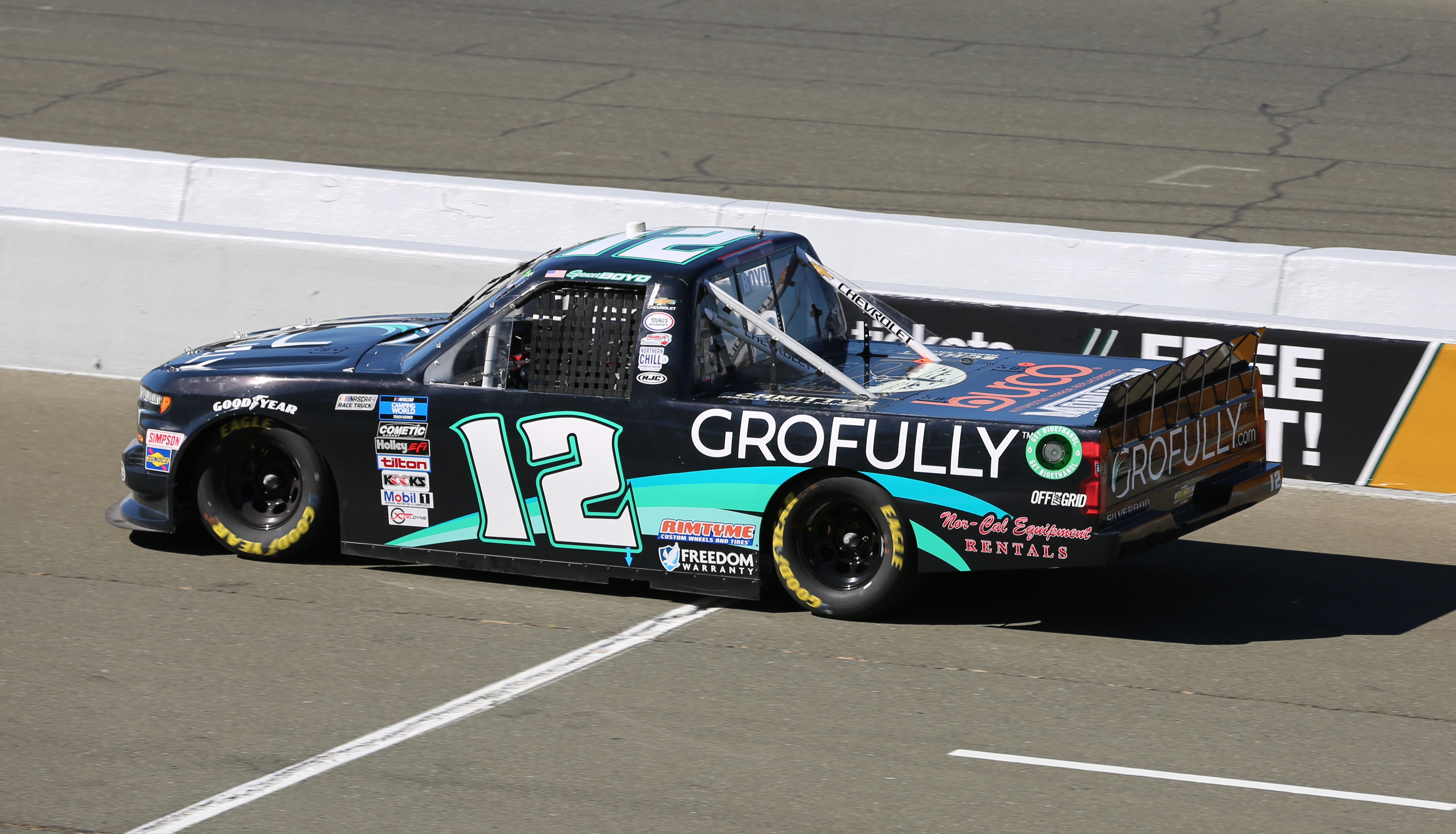
Spencer Boyd in the No. 12 at Sonoma Raceway in 2022

In 2018, the team debuted at Iowa Speedway with Reid Wilson behind the wheel. Ty Dillon drove at Eldora Speedway. Alex Tagliani was announced to drive at Mosport.

In 2019, Gus Dean joined Young's Motorsports to drive the No. 12 full-time. During the February Daytona race, he spun on the last laps hitting Ben Rhodes' No. 99 and then started the Big One, finishing fifteenth. His best finish was thirteenth at Michigan and his worst was thirty-second at Martinsville and Texas. He ended up finishing fifteenth in the points at the end of the 2019 season.

In 2020, T. J. Bell was to drive the Young's Motorsports No. 12 at the spring Atlanta race, but the truck was not entered when the race was postponed from March to June due to the COVID-19 pandemic. Bell would instead drive the No. 83 CMI Motorsports truck in the rescheduled race.

For 2021, Tate Fogleman would move over from the 02 to the 12 truck for his sophomore season to make room for rookie Kris Wright. He would start the season with a crash-ending 30th-place finish at Daytona. On October 2, Fogleman scored his first career win and Young's Motorsports' second win at Talladega by sending John Hunter Nemechek sideways and beating Tyler Hill by 0.052 seconds before both trucks crashed into the inner wall.

On January 7, 2022 it was announced that Spencer Boyd would drive the No. 12 full-time in 2022; he had driven the team's No. 20 truck since 2019. At Las Vegas, he suffered a dislocated shoulder in a last lap crash.

Boyd returned to drive the No. 12 truck full-time. He failed to qualify for the season opener at Daytona and struggled throughout the season, only scoring one top 20 finish. He also failed to qualify for the races at Talladega and Phoenix. Boyd parted ways with the team at season's end.

In 2024, Dale Quarterley would drive the No. 12 truck at Circuit of the Americas. He finished 26th.

==== Truck No. 12 results ====
Year	Driver	No.	Make	1	2	3	4	5	6	7	8	9	10	11	12	13	14	15	16	17	18	19	20	21	22	23	Owner	Pts
2018	Reid Wilson	12	Chevy	DAY	ATL	LVS	MAR; 16	DOV	KAN	CLT	TEX	IOW; 28	GTW	CHI	KEN												38th	78
2018	Ty Dillon	12	Chevy													ELD; 11	POC	MCH	BRI								38th	78
2018	Alex Tagliani	12	Chevy																	MSP; 10							38th	78
2018	Tate Fogleman	12	Chevy																		LVS; DNQ						38th	78
2018	Tanner Thorson	12	Chevy																			TAL; 31	MAR				38th	78
2018	Tyler Young	12	Chevy																					TEX; 27	PHO	HOM	38th	78
2019	Gus Dean	12	Chevy	DAY; 15	ATL; 15	LVS; 22	MAR; 32	TEX; 29	DOV; 14	KAN; 14	CLT; 26	TEX; 32	IOW; 20	GTW; 19	CHI; 15	KEN; 25	POC; 14	ELD; 28	MCH; 13	BRI; 18	MSP; 17	LVS; 15	TAL; 20	MAR; 14	PHO; 20	HOM; 15	17th	413
2021	Tate Fogleman	12	Chevy	DAY; 30	DAY; 19	LVS; 20	ATL; 26	BRI; 23	RCH; 39	KAN; 36	DAR; 30	COA; 25	CLT; 37	TEX; 25	NSH; 20	POC; 21	KNX; 9	GLN; 26	GTW; 14	DAR; 38	BRI; 37	LVS; 14	TAL; 1	MAR; 18	PHO; 34		20th	283
2022	Spencer Boyd	12	Chevy	DAY; 11	LVS; 27	ATL; 20	COA; 23	MAR; 33	BRI; 24	DAR; 24	KAN; 31	TEX; 28	CLT; 24	GTW; 31	SON; 23	KNX; 29	NSH; 25	MOH; 16	POC; 32	IRP; 36	RCH; 32	KAN; 33	BRI; 36	TAL; DNQ	HOM; 36	PHO; 33	28th	207
2023	Spencer Boyd	12	Chevy	DAY; DNQ	LVS; 23	ATL; 21	COA; 32	TEX; 22	BRD; 16	MAR; 23	KAN; 26	DAR; 33	NWS; 27	CLT; 31	GTW; 26	NSH; 25	MOH; 25	POC; 25	RCH; 35	IRP; 33	MLW; 32	KAN; 31	BRI; 31	TAL; DNQ	HOM; 33	PHO; DNQ	36th	165
2024	Dale Quarterley	12	Toyota	DAY	ATL	LVS	BRI	COA; 26	MAR	TEX	KAN	DAR	NWS	CLT	GTW	NSH	POC	IRP	RCH	MLW	BRI	KAN	TAL	HOM	MAR	PHO	46th	11

=== Truck No. 20 history ===
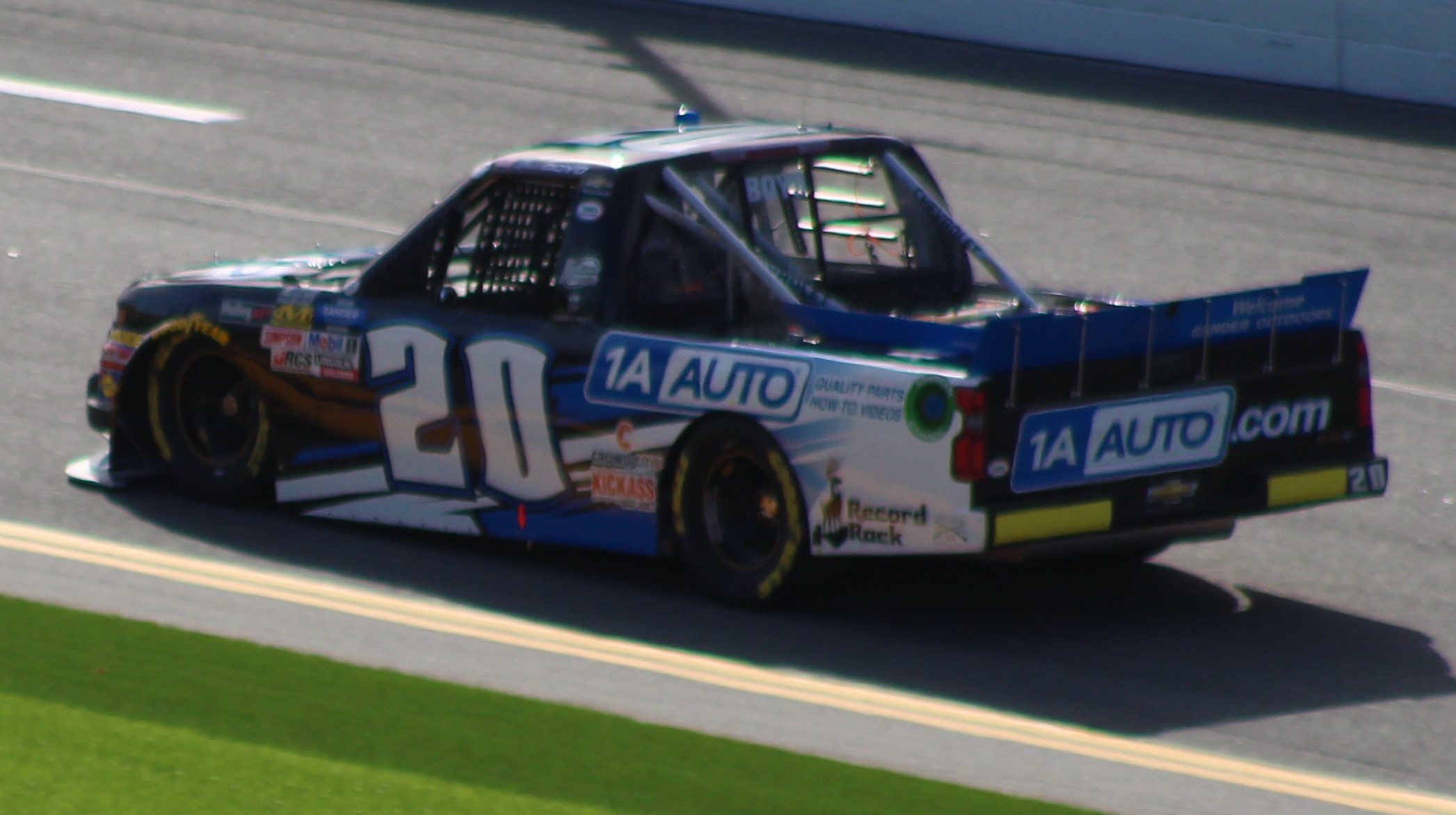
Spencer Boyd in the No. 20 at Daytona International Speedway in 2019

The No. 20 was Austin Hill Racing's former number. In 2017, with Hill now on No. 02 truck, the second truck became the No. 20. The team debuted at Iowa Speedway. Stadium Super Trucks champion Sheldon Creed drove the No. 20 at Eldora Speedway.

The team planned to run full-time with the No. 20 team in 2018. Scott Lagasse Jr. drove the No. 20 Chevrolet in the season opener at Daytona with a fifth place finish. Austin and Ty Dillon soon after announced through Team Dillon that Richard Childress Racing affiliated drivers, including both Austin and Ty Dillon, Daniel Hemric and Tanner Thorson would pilot the 20 for the vast majority of the remaining schedule, with Thorson taking most of the races. Michel Disdier, Reid Wilson, Tate Fogleman, Bubba Wallace and Max Tullman also drove the 20 truck in 2018.

For the 2019 season, Spencer Boyd was announced to pilot the No. 20 full-time. He started off the season with a career-best fourth-place result at Daytona. Boyd raced the team to an unofficial second-place finish at Talladega, however the unofficial winner, Johnny Sauter, would be penalized for forcing the No. 51 KBM truck of Riley Herbst below the double yellow line in an attempt to block, giving the win to Boyd and Young's Motorsports. Boyd would return to the No. 20 truck in 2020 and would take it to a best finish of fourteenth at Texas and a twentieth place points finish. He would return to the No. 20 truck for a third season in 2021 and would take the truck to a 13th-place finish behind teammate Kris Wright at Daytona. In the Corn Belt 150, Kyle Strickler replaced Boyd.

In 2022, Boyd moved to the No. 12 truck. As the results, multiple drivers such as Danny Bohn, Matt Mills, Sheldon Creed, Dillon Steuer, Austin Dillon, Garrett Smithley, Thad Moffitt, Stefan Parsons, Trey Burke, Jesse Little, Joey Gase, Leland Honeyman, Parker Retzlaff, and Armani Williams took over the driving duties of the No. 20 truck. Creed made his pole position at Circuit of the Americas. He then start and parked after 1 lap due to his transmission issues after replacing the fuel pump during the pace laps.

In 2023, the No. 20 truck returned with multiple drivers such as Derek Kraus, Matt Mills, Mason Maggio, Ed Jones, Stefan Parsons, Brad Perez, Nick Leitz, Kaden Honeycutt, Chad Chastain, Mason Massey, and Greg Van Alst. Van Alst suffered a fractured vertebrae from a multi-truck accident at Talladega.

In 2024, the No. 20 truck was reduced to part-time basis with multiple drivers such as Vicente Salas, Blake Lothian, Brad Perez, Memphis Villarreal, Akinori Ogata, and Jerry Bohlman.

In 2025, the No. 20 truck returned in part-time basis with Stefan Parsons, Jordan Anderson, Mason Massey, and Will Rodgers as the drivers.

==== Truck No. 20 results ====
Year	Driver	No.	Make	1	2	3	4	5	6	7	8	9	10	11	12	13	14	15	16	17	18	19	20	21	22	23	24	25	Owner	Pts
2017	Tyler Young	20	Chevy	DAY	ATL	MAR	KAN	CLT	DOV	TEX	GTW	IOW; 30	KEN											TEX; 17	PHO	HOM			41st	48
2017	Sheldon Creed	20	Chevy											ELD; 27	POC	MCH	BRI	MSP	CHI	NHA	LVS	TAL							41st	48
2017	Jeb Burton	20	Chevy																				MAR; 26						41st	48
2018	Scott Lagasse Jr.	20	Chevy	DAY; 5																									18th	428
2018	Austin Dillon	20	Chevy		ATL; 10																								18th	428
2018	Michel Disdier	20	Chevy			LVS; 19																							18th	428
2018	Reid Wilson	20	Chevy				MAR; 16																						18th	428
2018	Tanner Thorson	20	Chevy					DOV; 16				IOW; 13				ELD; 19	POC; 15		BRI; 14		LVS; 32		MAR; 31	TEX; 21	PHO; 18	HOM; 29			18th	428
2018	Bubba Wallace	20	Chevy						KAN; 14																				18th	428
2018	Daniel Hemric	20	Chevy							CLT; 21																			18th	428
2018	Tyler Young	20	Chevy								TEX; 7																		18th	428
2018	Tate Fogleman	20	Chevy										GTW; 27		KEN; 28			MCH; 15											18th	428
2018	Max Tullman	20	Chevy											CHI; 23						MSP; 30		TAL; 9							18th	428
2019	Spencer Boyd	20	Chevy	DAY; 4	ATL; 25	LVS; 29	MAR; 27	TEX; 11	DOV; 22	KAN; 17	CLT; 22	TEX; 23	IOW; 16	GTW; 20	CHI; 17	KEN; 29	POC; 18		MCH; 22			LVS; 20	TAL; 1	MAR; 15					16th	419
2019	Landon Huffman	20	Chevy															ELD; 24		BRI; 16									16th	419
2019	Dylan Lupton	20	Chevy																		MSP; 19								16th	419
2019	Colby Howard	20	Chevy																						PHO; 21	HOM; 24			16th	419
2020	Spencer Boyd	20	Chevy	DAY; 19	LVS; 25	CLT; 25	ATL; 27	HOM; 22	POC; 22	KEN; 38	TEX; 24	KAN; 23	KAN; 18	MCH; 27	DRC; 17	DOV; 28	GTW; 25	DAR; 26	RCH; 20	BRI; 27	LVS; 28	TAL; 38	KAN; 22	TEX; 14	MAR; 15	PHO; 27			26th	306
2021	Spencer Boyd	20	Chevy	DAY; 13	DRC; 39	LVS; 22	ATL; 33	BRD; 25	RCH; 27	KAN; 35	DAR; 22	COA; DNQ	CLT; 26	TEX; 27	NSH; DNQ	POC; 27		GLN; 33	GTW; 16	DAR; 21	BRI; 31	LVS; 19	TAL; 7	MAR; 15	PHO; 31				32nd	251
2021	Kyle Strickler	20	Chevy														KNX; 23												32nd	251
2022	Danny Bohn	20	Chevy	DAY; 8						DAR; 22																			29th	247
2022	Matt Mills	20	Chevy		LVS; 15	ATL; 35					KAN; 34		CLT; 34	GTW; DNQ															29th	247
2022	Sheldon Creed	20	Chevy				COA; 36																						29th	247
2022	Dillon Steuer	20	Chevy					MAR; 32																					29th	247
2022	Austin Dillon	20	Chevy						BRD; 14						SON; 17														29th	247
2022	Garrett Smithley	20	Chevy									TEX; DNQ																	29th	247
2022	Thad Moffitt	20	Chevy													KNX; 31													29th	247
2022	Stefan Parsons	20	Chevy														NSH; 22								HOM; 26				29th	247
2022	Trey Burke	20	Chevy															MOH; 35											29th	247
2022	Jesse Little	20	Chevy																POC; 26	IRP; 15		KAN; 28							29th	247
2022	Joey Gase	20	Chevy																		RCH; 29								29th	247
2022	Leland Honeyman	20	Chevy																				BRI; 29						29th	247
2022	Parker Retzlaff	20	Chevy																					TAL; 16					29th	247
2022	Armani Williams	20	Chevy																							PHO; 35			29th	247
2023	Derek Kraus	20	Chevy	DAY; 18																									34th	196
2023	Matt Mills	20	Chevy		LVS; 26			TEX; 31						CLT; 30	GTW; 19		MOH; 22												34th	196
2023	Mason Maggio	20	Chevy			ATL; 35																							34th	196
2023	Ed Jones	20	Chevy				COA; 36																						34th	196
2023	Stefan Parsons	20	Chevy						BRI; 36																				34th	196
2023	Brad Perez	20	Chevy							MAR; 35																			34th	196
2023	Nick Leitz	20	Chevy								KAN; 21					NSH; 19									HOM; 23	PHO; 19			34th	196
2023	Kaden Honeycutt	20	Chevy									DAR; 10	NWS; 17																34th	196
2023	Chad Chastain	20	Chevy															POC; DNQ											34th	196
2023	Mason Massey	20	Chevy																RCH; 34										34th	196
2023	Greg Van Alst	20	Chevy																	IRP; 36	MLW; 34	KAN; 32	BRI; 34	TAL; 26					34th	196
2024	Vicente Salas	20	Chevy	DAY	ATL	LVS	BRI	COA; 34																					41st	26
2024	Blake Lothian	20	Chevy						MAR; 34																				41st	26
2024	Memphis Villarreal	20	Chevy							TEX; 33	KAN	DAR	NWS	CLT; 29	GTW														41st	26
2024	Akinori Ogata	20	Chevy													NSH; 30	POC	IRP											41st	26
2024	Jerry Bohlman	20	Chevy																RCH; 36	MLW	BRI	KAN	TAL	HOM	MAR	PHO			41st	26
2025	Stefan Parsons	20	Chevy	DAY	ATL	LVS	HOM; 18	MAR	BRI	CAR	TEX; 12	KAN	NWS	CLT	NSH	MCH	POC	LRP				DAR; 15	BRI; 25						33rd	126
2025	Jordan Anderson	20	Chevy																IRP; 29	GLN	RCH								33rd	126
2025	Mason Massey	20	Chevy																					NHA; 19					33rd	126
2025	Will Rodgers	20	Chevy																						ROV; 15	TAL	MAR	PHO	33rd	126

=== Truck No. 42 history ===
In 2014, the team attempted to field a second truck (No. 60) for Charles Lewandoski at Daytona, but it was withdrawn prior to the race. The second truck returned at Kansas as a start and park team to help fund the team's No. 02 truck, now with a new number (No. 42). After making six starts, the No. 42 team shut down.

==== Truck No. 42 results ====
Year	Driver	No.	Make	1	2	3	4	5	6	7	8	9	10	11	12	13	14	15	16	17	18	19	20	21	22	Owner	Pts
2014	Charles Lewandoski	60	Chevy	DAY; Wth	MAR																					41st	64
2014	Charles Lewandoski	42	Chevy			KAN; 29	CLT; 33	DOV; 32	TEX	GTW; 30	KEN; 31	IOW; 34	ELD	POC	MCH	BRI	MSP	CHI	NHA	LVS	TAL	MAR	TEX	PHO	HOM	41st	64

=== Truck No. 46 history ===
On July 10, 2024, it was announced that Thad Moffitt would race the No. 46 truck for Young's Motorsports for the rest of the season starting at Pocono after YMS acquired the number and team from Faction46.

==== Truck No. 46 results ====
Year	Driver	No.	Make	1	2	3	4	5	6	7	8	9	10	11	12	13	14	15	16	17	18	19	20	21	22	23	Owners	Pts
2024	Thad Moffitt	46	Chevy	DAY	ATL	LVS	BRI	COA	MAR	TEX	KAN	DAR	NWS	CLT	GTW	NSH	POC; 29	IRP; 32	RCH; 33	MLW; 32						PHO; 27	33rd	174
2024	Tyler Tomassi	46	Chevy																		BRI; 34						33rd	174
2024	Justin Mondeik	46	Chevy																			KAN; 26	TAL	HOM; 32	MAR		33rd	174

=== Partnerships ===
In 2013, Tyler Young drove No. 6 for the team at Rockingham Speedway, using Sharp Gallaher Racing owners' points. He finished 24th in the race.

In 2016, Young's teamed with Austin Hill Racing fielding No. 02 Ford for Hill's self-owned team in four races. Later that year Young's partnered with Rette Jones Racing to field the No. 02 for Dominique Van Wieringen at Phoenix International Raceway. The next race, at Homestead, Young's fielded the No. 07 truck for Patrick Staropoli that utilized owner points from SS-Green Light Racing.

In 2017, Austin Hill started to run for the team in No. 02, sharing the truck with Tyler Young. However, Hill drove Ford trucks that he owned while Young ran Chevrolets from the team inventory.

== ARCA Menards Series ==
=== Car No. 02 history ===
On January 14, 2021, the team announced that they would expand into the ARCA Menards Series, fielding the No. 02 car on a part-time basis. The team first entered the series in ARCA's Daytona test session in January with Kris Wright (one of their full-time Truck Series drivers) and Toni Breidinger driving. Their first race will come in the season-opening race at Daytona in February, although they have yet to determine the rest of their schedule and who their driver(s) will be in each race. Toni Breidinger made some appearances for the team. Mark Green would appear at Mid-Ohio. Breidinger would depart the team and join her old team Venturini Motorsports. Connor Mosack made 3 starts for the rest of the year.

In 2022, Leland Honeyman drove the No. 02 car for 3 races. Kris Wright drove the car for 1 race at Pocono. Mamba Smith made his ARCA debut in the No. 02 car at IRP.

In 2023, Miguel Gomes drove the No. 02 car at Daytona. Honeyman drove the car at Phoenix. Parker Retzlaff would drive the car at Watkins Glen.

In 2024, Honeyman drove the No. 02 car at Daytona. He finished 31st after caught up in an accident.

In 2025, Craig Bracken drove the No. 02 car at Daytona. Bracken was involved in a crash on lap 19 and finished the race in 27th. After being taken to the infield care center after the accident, Bracken was transported to a local hospital for further evaluation.

==== Car No. 02 results ====
Year	Driver	No.	Make	1	2	3	4	5	6	7	8	9	10	11	12	13	14	15	16	17	18	19	20	AMSC	Pts
2021	Toni Breidinger	02	Chevy	DAY; 18	PHO; 30	TAL; 12	KAN; 12	TOL	CLT; 20																
2021	Mark Green	02	Chevy							MOH; 17	POC	ELK	BLN	IOW	WIN	GLN									
2021	Connor Mosack	02	Chevy														MCH; 16	ISF	MLW; 16	DSF	BRI	SLM	KAN; 11		
2022	Leland Honeyman	02	Chevy	DAY	PHO	TAL	KAN	CLT	IOW; 6	BLN	ELK	MOH						MLW; 11	DSF	KAN	BRI; 28	SLM	TOL		
2022	Kris Wright	02	Chevy										POC; 8												
2022	Mamba Smith	02	Chevy											IRP; 9	MCH	GLN	ISF								
2023	Miguel Gomes	02	Chevy	DAY; 31																					
2023	Leland Honeyman	02	Chevy		PHO; 8	TAL	KAN	CLT	BLN	ELK	MOH	IOW	POC	MCH	IRP										
2023	Parker Retzlaff	02	Chevy													GLN; 18	ISF	MLW	DSF	KAN	BRI	SLM	TOL		
2024	Leland Honeyman	02	Chevy	DAY; 31	PHO	TAL	DOV	KAN	CLT	IOW	MOH	BLN	IRP	SLM	ELK	MCH	ISF	MLW	DSF	GLN	BRI	KAN	TOL		
2025	Craig Bracken	02	Chevy	DAY; 27	PHO	TAL	KAN	CLT	MCH	BER	ELK	LRP	DOV	IRP	IOW	GLN	ISF	MAD	DSF	BRI	SLM	KAN	TOL		

== ARCA Menards Series East ==
=== Car No. 02 history ===
In 2021, the team fielded the No. 02 car part-time in the ARCA Menards Series East for Connor Mosack at Dover. He finished seventh. He would make one more start at the Milwaukee Mile. He finished sixteenth.

In 2022, the No. 02 car would run full-time with Leland Honeyman as the driver.

==== Car No. 02 results ====
Year	Driver	No.	Make	1	2	3	4	5	6	7	8	AMSEC	Pts
2021	Connor Mosack	02	Chevy	NSM	FIF	NSV	DOV; 7	SNM	IOW	MLW; 16	BRI		
2022	Leland Honeyman	02	Chevy	NSM; 4	FIF; 2	DOV; 8	NSV; 5	IOW; 6	MLW; 11	BRI; 28			

== ARCA Menards Series West ==
=== Car No. 02 history ===
In 2021, the team fielded the No. 02 car part-time for Toni Breidinger at Phoenix.

In 2022, the team fielded the No. 02 car part-time for Katie Hettinger at Las Vegas Bullring and Phoenix.

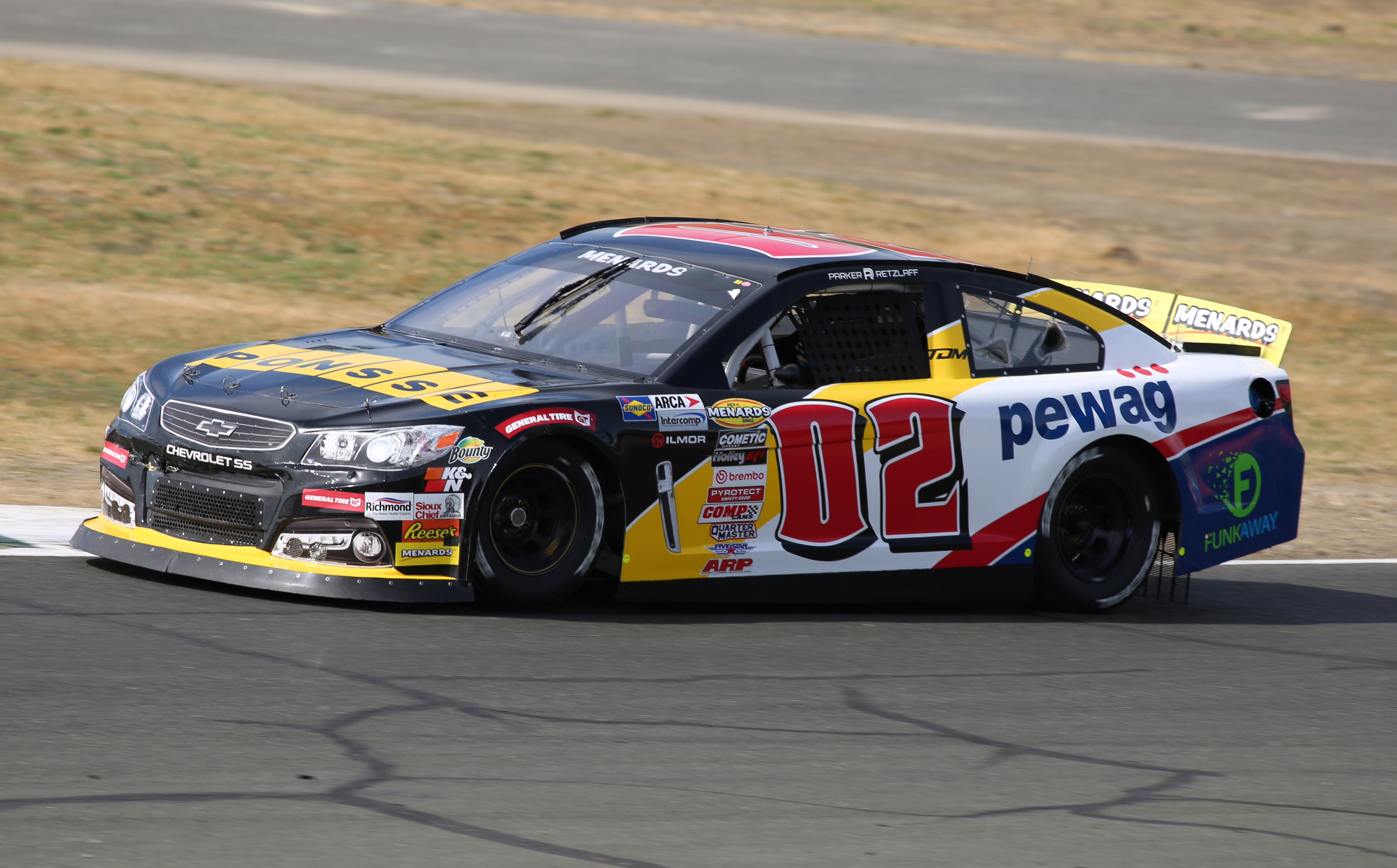
Retzlaff at Sonoma in 2023.

In 2023, the team fielded the No. 02 car part-time for Leland Honeyman at Phoenix. Parker Retzlaff would drive the No. 02 car at Portland and Sonoma. Mamba Smith would drive the No. 02 car at season finale at Phoenix.

==== Car No. 02 results ====
Year	Team	No.	Make	1	2	3	4	5	6	7	8	9	10	11	12	AMSWC	Pts
2021	Toni Breidinger	02	Chevy	PHO; 30	SON	IRW	CNS	IRW	PIR	LVS	AAS	PHO					
2022	Katie Hettinger	02	Chevy	PHO	IRW	KCR	PIR	SON	IRW	EVG	PIR	AAS	LVS; 23	PHO; 19			
2023	Leland Honeyman	02	Chevy	PHO; 8	IRW	KCR											
2023	Parker Retzlaff	02	Chevy				PIR; 5	SON; 25	IRW	SHA	EVG	AAS	LVS	MAD			
2023	Mamba Smith	02	Chevy												PHO; 15		
