= 2022 Blue-Emu Maximum Pain Relief 200 =

Fifth race of the 2022 NASCAR Camping World Truck Series

Race details
- Race 5 of 23 of the 2022 NASCAR Camping World Truck Series
- Date: April 7, 2022
- Official name: Blue-Emu Maximum Pain Relief 200
- Location: Martinsville Speedway, Martinsville, Virginia
- Course: Permanent racing facility
- Course length: 0.526 miles (0.847 km)
- Distance: 200 laps, 105.2 mi (169.302 km)
- Scheduled distance: 200 laps, 105.2 mi (169.302 km)
- Average speed: 58.662 mph (94.407 km/h)

Pole position
Driver	Zane Smith	Front Row Motorsports
- Time: Set by qualifying matrix

Most laps led
Driver	William Byron	Spire Motorsports
- Laps: 94

Winner
No. 7	William Byron	Spire Motorsports

Television in the United States
- Network: Fox Sports 1
- Announcers: Vince Welch, Phil Parsons, Michael Waltrip

Radio in the United States
- Radio: Motor Racing Network

The 2022 Blue-Emu Maximum Pain Relief 200 was the fifth stock car race of the 2022 NASCAR Camping World Truck Series and the 20th iteration of the event. The race was held on Thursday, April 7, 2022, in Martinsville, Virginia at Martinsville Speedway, a 0.526 miles (0.847 km) permanent oval-shaped short track. The race was run over 200 laps. William Byron of Spire Motorsports would win the race after leading 94 laps. This was Byron's eighth career truck series win, and his first of the season. This was also the second win for Spire Motorsports in NASCAR. To fill out the podium, Johnny Sauter of ThorSport Racing and Kyle Busch of Kyle Busch Motorsports would finish 2nd and 3rd, respectively.

Several drivers would make their debut in this race: Dillon Steuer, Chase Janes, Blake Lothian, and Kaden Honeycutt. Due to practice and qualifying being cancelled from inclement weather, and having no owner points, Justin Carroll and Jake Garcia would not qualify for the race, therefore not being able to make their first start.

== Background ==
Martinsville Speedway is a NASCAR-owned stock car racing track located in Henry County, in Ridgeway, Virginia, just to the south of Martinsville. At 0.526 mi (0.847 km) in length, it is the shortest track in the NASCAR Cup Series. The track was also one of the first paved oval tracks in NASCAR, being built in 1947 by H. Clay Earles. It is also the only remaining race track that has been on the NASCAR circuit from its beginning in 1948.

=== Entry list ===
- (R) denotes rookie driver.
- (i) denotes driver who is ineligible for series driver points.

#	Driver	Team	Make
1	Hailie Deegan	David Gilliland Racing	Ford
02	Jesse Little	Young's Motorsports	Chevrolet
4	John Hunter Nemechek	Kyle Busch Motorsports	Toyota
7	William Byron (i)	Spire Motorsports	Chevrolet
9	Blaine Perkins (R)	CR7 Motorsports	Chevrolet
12	Spencer Boyd	Young's Motorsports	Chevrolet
13	Johnny Sauter	ThorSport Racing	Toyota
15	Tanner Gray	David Gilliland Racing	Ford
16	Tyler Ankrum	Hattori Racing Enterprises	Toyota
17	Taylor Gray	David Gilliland Racing	Ford
18	Chandler Smith	Kyle Busch Motorsports	Toyota
19	Derek Kraus	McAnally-Hilgemann Racing	Chevrolet
20	Dillon Steuer	Young's Motorsports	Chevrolet
22	Austin Wayne Self	AM Racing	Chevrolet
23	Grant Enfinger	GMS Racing	Chevrolet
24	Jack Wood (R)	GMS Racing	Chevrolet
25	Matt DiBenedetto	Rackley WAR	Chevrolet
30	Tate Fogleman	On Point Motorsports	Toyota
32	Bret Holmes	Bret Holmes Racing	Chevrolet
33	Chase Janes	Reaume Brothers Racing	Toyota
35	Jake Garcia	McAnally-Hilgemann Racing	Chevrolet
38	Zane Smith	Front Row Motorsports	Ford
40	Dean Thompson (R)	Niece Motorsports	Chevrolet
42	Carson Hocevar	Niece Motorsports	Chevrolet
43	Blake Lothian	Reaume Brothers Racing	Chevrolet
44	Kris Wright	Niece Motorsports	Chevrolet
45	Lawless Alan (R)	Niece Motorsports	Chevrolet
46	Kaden Honeycutt	G2G Racing	Toyota
47	Tim Viens**	G2G Racing	Toyota
51	Kyle Busch (i)	Kyle Busch Motorsports	Toyota
52	Stewart Friesen	Halmar Friesen Racing	Toyota
56	Timmy Hill	Hill Motorsports	Toyota
61	Chase Purdy	Hattori Racing Enterprises	Toyota
66	Ty Majeski	ThorSport Racing	Toyota
75	Parker Kligerman	Henderson Motorsports	Chevrolet
88	Matt Crafton	ThorSport Racing	Toyota
90	Justin Carroll	TC Motorsports	Toyota
91	Colby Howard	McAnally-Hilgemann Racing	Chevrolet
98	Christian Eckes	ThorSport Racing	Toyota
99	Ben Rhodes	ThorSport Racing	Toyota
Official entry list

- ** – Withdrew prior to the event.

== Practice/qualifying ==
Practice and qualifying was scheduled to be held on Thursday, April 7, but was both cancelled due to inclement weather. The starting lineup would be based on a qualifying matrix. Zane Smith would score the pole for the race.

=== Full qualifying results ===
Pos.	#	Driver	Team	Make	Time	Speed
1	38	Zane Smith	Front Row Motorsports	Ford	—	—
2	51	Kyle Busch (i)	Kyle Busch Motorsports	Toyota	—	—
3	99	Ben Rhodes	ThorSport Racing	Toyota	—	—
4	18	Chandler Smith	Kyle Busch Motorsports	Toyota	—	—
5	4	John Hunter Nemechek	Kyle Busch Motorsports	Toyota	—	—
6	52	Stewart Friesen	Halmar Friesen Racing	Toyota	—	—
7	98	Christian Eckes	ThorSport Racing	Toyota	—	—
8	16	Tyler Ankrum	Hattori Racing Enterprises	Toyota	—	—
9	42	Carson Hocevar	Niece Motorsports	Chevrolet	—	—
10	19	Derek Kraus	McAnally-Hilgemann Racing	Chevrolet	—	—
11	88	Matt Crafton	ThorSport Racing	Toyota	—	—
12	23	Grant Enfinger	GMS Racing	Chevrolet	—	—
13	15	Tanner Gray	David Gilliland Racing	Ford	—	—
14	44	Kris Wright	Niece Motorsports	Chevrolet	—	—
15	45	Lawless Alan (R)	Niece Motorsports	Chevrolet	—	—
16	66	Ty Majeski	ThorSport Racing	Toyota	—	—
17	61	Chase Purdy	Hattori Racing Enterprises	Toyota	—	—
18	75	Parker Kligerman	Henderson Motorsports	Chevrolet	—	—
19	17	Taylor Gray	David Gilliland Racing	Ford	—	—
20	56	Timmy Hill	Hill Motorsports	Toyota	—	—
21	30	Tate Fogleman	On Point Motorsports	Toyota	—	—
22	22	Austin Wayne Self	AM Racing	Chevrolet	—	—
23	25	Matt DiBenedetto	Rackley WAR	Chevrolet	—	—
24	12	Spencer Boyd	Young's Motorsports	Chevrolet	—	—
25	02	Jesse Little	Young's Motorsports	Chevrolet	—	—
26	91	Colby Howard	McAnally-Hilgemann Racing	Chevrolet	—	—
27	33	Chase Janes	Reaume Brothers Racing	Toyota	—	—
28	40	Dean Thompson (R)	Niece Motorsports	Chevrolet	—	—
29	24	Jack Wood (R)	GMS Racing	Chevrolet	—	—
30	43	Blake Lothian	Reaume Brothers Racing	Toyota	—	—
31	1	Hailie Deegan	David Gilliland Racing	Ford	—	—
Qualified by owner's points
32	7	William Byron (i)	Spire Motorsports	Chevrolet	—	—
33	20	Dillon Steuer	Young's Motorsports	Chevrolet	—	—
34	46	Kaden Honeycutt	G2G Racing	Toyota	—	—
35	32	Bret Holmes	Bret Holmes Racing	Chevrolet	—	—
36	13	Johnny Sauter	ThorSport Racing	Toyota	—	—
Failed to qualify
37	9	Blaine Perkins (R)	CR7 Motorsports	Chevrolet	—	—
38	90	Justin Carroll	TC Motorsports	Toyota	—	—
39	35	Jake Garcia	McAnally-Hilgemann Racing	Chevrolet	—	—
Official starting lineup

== Race results ==
Stage 1 Laps: 50

Pos.	#	Driver	Team	Make	Pts
1	38	Zane Smith	Front Row Motorsports	Ford	10
2	52	Stewart Friesen	Halmar Friesen Racing	Toyota	9
3	99	Ben Rhodes	ThorSport Racing	Toyota	8
4	4	John Hunter Nemechek	Kyle Busch Motorsports	Toyota	7
5	23	Grant Enfinger	GMS Racing	Chevrolet	6
6	98	Christian Eckes	ThorSport Racing	Toyota	5
7	19	Derek Kraus	McAnally-Hilgemann Racing	Chevrolet	4
8	15	Tanner Gray	David Gilliland Racing	Ford	3
9	61	Chase Purdy	Hattori Racing Enterprises	Toyota	2
10	16	Tyler Ankrum	Hattori Racing Enterprises	Toyota	1

Stage 2 Laps: 50

Pos.	#	Driver	Team	Make	Pts
1	99	Ben Rhodes	ThorSport Racing	Toyota	10
2	98	Christian Eckes	ThorSport Racing	Toyota	9
3	42	Carson Hocevar	Niece Motorsports	Chevrolet	8
4	38	Zane Smith	Front Row Motorsports	Ford	7
5	4	John Hunter Nemechek	Kyle Busch Motorsports	Toyota	6
6	66	Ty Majeski	ThorSport Racing	Toyota	5
7	25	Matt DiBenedetto	Rackley WAR	Chevrolet	4
8	75	Parker Kligerman	Henderson Motorsports	Chevrolet	3
9	23	Grant Enfinger	GMS Racing	Chevrolet	2
10	17	Taylor Gray	David Gilliland Racing	Ford	1

Stage 3 Laps: 100

Fin.	St	#	Driver	Team	Make	Laps	Led	Status	Points
1	32	7	William Byron (i)	Spire Motorsports	Chevrolet	200	94	Running	0
2	36	13	Johnny Sauter	ThorSport Racing	Toyota	200	0	Running	35
3	2	51	Kyle Busch (i)	Kyle Busch Motorsports	Toyota	200	1	Running	0
4	5	4	John Hunter Nemechek	Kyle Busch Motorsports	Toyota	200	0	Running	46
5	3	99	Ben Rhodes	ThorSport Racing	Toyota	200	47	Running	50
6	4	18	Chandler Smith	Kyle Busch Motorsports	Toyota	200	2	Running	31
7	11	88	Matt Crafton	ThorSport Racing	Toyota	200	0	Running	30
8	12	23	Grant Enfinger	GMS Racing	Chevrolet	200	0	Running	37
9	1	38	Zane Smith	Front Row Motorsports	Ford	200	55	Running	45
10	8	16	Tyler Ankrum	Hattori Racing Enterprises	Toyota	200	0	Running	28
11	16	66	Ty Majeski	ThorSport Racing	Toyota	200	0	Running	31
12	7	98	Christian Eckes	ThorSport Racing	Toyota	200	0	Running	39
13	6	52	Stewart Friesen	Halmar Friesen Racing	Toyota	200	0	Running	33
14	10	19	Derek Kraus	McAnally-Hilgemann Racing	Chevrolet	200	0	Running	27
15	23	25	Matt DiBenedetto	Rackley WAR	Chevrolet	200	0	Running	26
16	18	75	Parker Kligerman	Henderson Motorsports	Chevrolet	200	0	Running	24
17	9	42	Carson Hocevar	Niece Motorsports	Chevrolet	200	1	Running	28
18	26	91	Colby Howard	McAnally-Hilgemann Racing	Chevrolet	200	0	Running	19
19	31	1	Hailie Deegan	David Gilliland Racing	Ford	200	0	Running	18
20	15	45	Lawless Alan (R)	Niece Motorsports	Chevrolet	200	0	Running	17
21	13	15	Tanner Gray	David Gilliland Racing	Ford	200	0	Running	19
22	21	30	Tate Fogleman	On Point Motorsports	Toyota	200	0	Running	15
23	20	56	Timmy Hill	Hill Motorsports	Toyota	200	0	Running	14
24	35	32	Bret Holmes	Bret Holmes Racing	Chevrolet	199	0	Running	13
25	27	33	Chase Janes	Reaume Brothers Racing	Toyota	199	0	Running	12
26	19	17	Taylor Gray	David Gilliland Racing	Ford	198	0	Running	12
27	25	02	Jesse Little	Young's Motorsports	Chevrolet	198	0	Running	10
28	30	43	Blake Lothian	Reaume Brothers Racing	Toyota	198	0	Running	9
29	17	61	Chase Purdy	Hattori Racing Enterprises	Toyota	197	0	Running	10
30	14	44	Kris Wright	Niece Motorsports	Chevrolet	195	0	Running	7
31	22	22	Austin Wayne Self	AM Racing	Chevrolet	157	0	Brakes	6
32	33	20	Dillon Steuer	Young's Motorsports	Chevrolet	122	0	Accident	5
33	24	12	Spencer Boyd	Young's Motorsports	Chevrolet	119	0	Electrical	4
34	34	46	Kaden Honeycutt	G2G Racing	Toyota	107	0	Accident	3
35	29	24	Jack Wood (R)	GMS Racing	Chevrolet	26	0	Accident	2
36	28	40	Dean Thompson (R)	Niece Motorsports	Chevrolet	13	0	Electrical	1
Official race results

== Standings after the race ==
Drivers' Championship standings

Pos	Driver	Points
1	Ben Rhodes	205
2	Chandler Smith	201 (-4)
3	Zane Smith	184 (-21)
4	Stewart Friesen	180 (-25)
5	John Hunter Nemechek	161 (-44)
6	Christian Eckes	161 (-44)
7	Tanner Gray	158 (-47)
8	Ty Majeski	153 (-52)
9	Matt Crafton	132 (-73)
10	Tyler Ankrum	132 (-73)
Official driver's standings

- Note: Only the first 10 positions are included for the driver standings.

Previous race: 2022 XPEL 225	NASCAR Camping World Truck Series; 2022 season	Next race: 2022 Pinty's Dirt Truck Race
